= LaTonya Swann =

American dancer

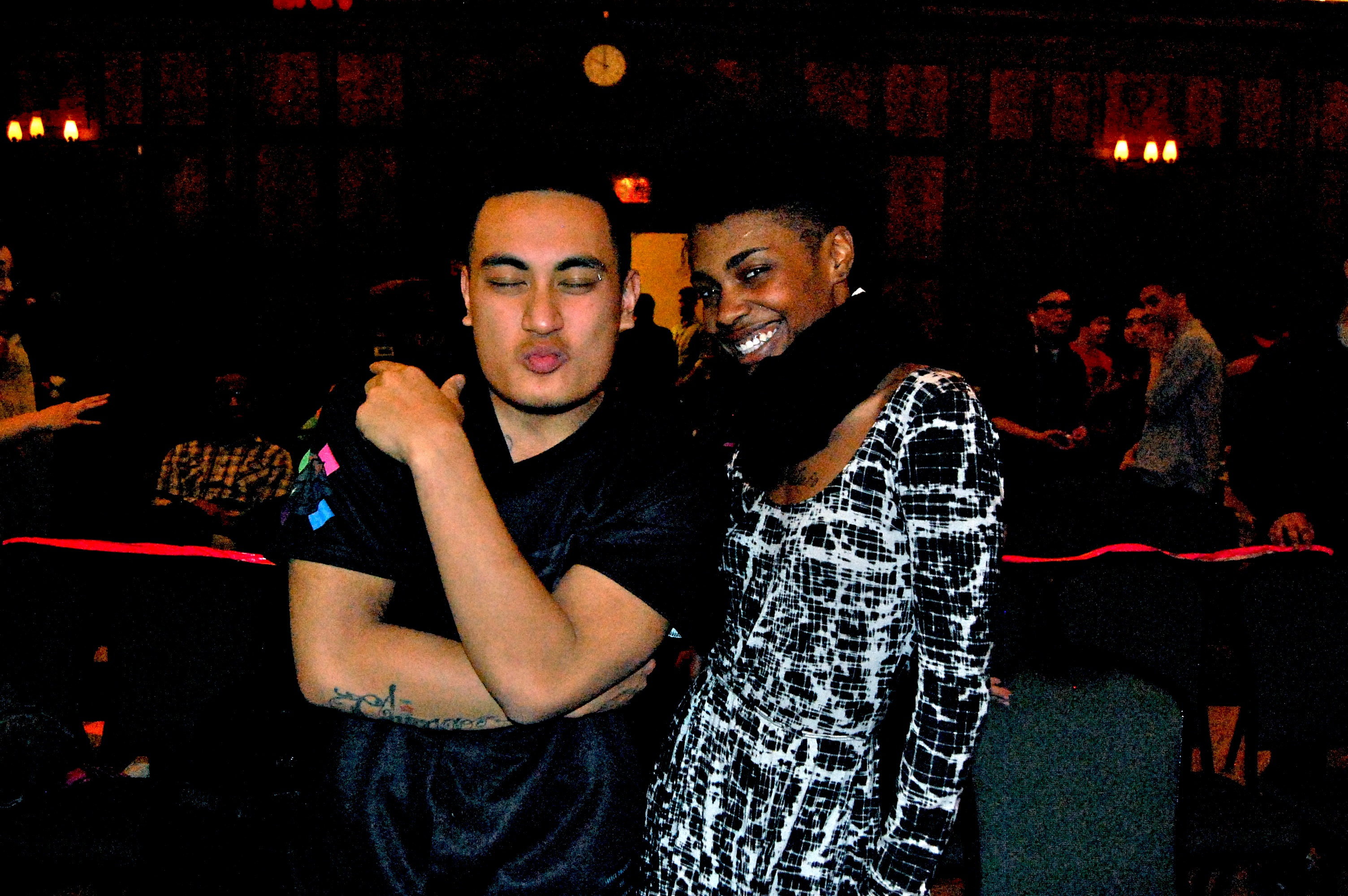
- Niko Tumamak and Swann at UW-Madison Dance Competition
- Born: February 4, 1991 (age 35); District Heights, Maryland, U.S.
- Occupations: Dancer, choreographer, actress, model, philanthropist,
- Years active: 2011–present

LaTonya Swann (born February 4, 1991) is an American dancer, choreographer, print model, philanthropist, and the first winner of BET's Born to Dance (TV series): Laurieann Gibson.

== Life and career ==
LaTonya Swann was raised in District Heights, Maryland and graduated from Dr. Henry A. Wise, Jr. High School in 2009. She was a member of the Jr Washington Redskins All Star Dance Team, and Capitol Movement Faculty and Alumni, training in hip hop, jazz, ballet, and contemporary. After winning the $50,000 prize on Born to Dance in 2011 Swann moved to Los Angeles and working bicoastally, opened a large scale dance studio in Capitol Heights, Maryland which shares the name of her "Seize The Dance" chest tattoo. Swann has worked as a dancer and/or actress with Lady Gaga, Dawn Richard, Cassie, Shakira, Enrique Iglesias, Lil Mama, Aloe Blacc, Beyoncé, Cher Lloyd, Avenged Sevenfold, Memphis May Fire, Pharrell Williams, Alicia Keys, Tinie Tempah, Jonas Åkerlund, Gil Green, Colin Tilley, Rich Lee, Joe Dante, Matt Alonzo, Jon Jon Augustavo, Melina Matsoukas, and So Me. She has worked as a choreographer on television, tours, music videos, and stage plays including 106 and Park, WDCW and Royal The Stage Play written and directed by Chris Clanton. She has been a celebrity judge and instructor for University of Wisconsin–Madison Move If You Want It Dance Competition, and celebrity guest instructor for Get Kids Movin National Kids Fitness Convention.

== Born To Dance ==
Swann first appeared on the debut of Born To Dance: Laurieann Gibson August 2, 2011 at 10pm ET bringing in 1.2 million viewers. The show was produced by Laurieann Gibson and The Ted & Perry Company and included an appearance of Lady Gaga with her Monster Ball Tour Performance being the final show challenge.

=== "Born to dance" episodes ===
Season	Week	Dancers	Challenge	Description	Episode title
Born to Dance (season 1)	1	Top 20	Casting	"Aspiring dancers vie for top honors and a $50,000 prize in this reality-competition series starring celebrity choreographer Laurieann Gibson. First up: Laurieann and her team preside over open casting calls for female dancers."	The Search Begins
Born to Dance (season 1)	2	Top 17	Essentials of Dance	"Laurieann teaches the essentials of dance to her charges, zeroing in on ballet, hip-hop and jazz. Elsewhere, the dancers cook up dinner plans for their tutor, but the heat is on when they make a big mistake."	Triple Threat
Born to Dance (season 1)	3	Top 12	Music Video	"Laurieann offers a course on the essentials of music videos, after which the dancers take part in a video shoot. Meanwhile, family problems impact one contestant."	Designing Dancers
Born to Dance (season 1)	4	Top 10	The Mo'Nique Show	"The dancers take to the stage to perform before an audience at "The Mo'Nique Show," yet a division surfaces when one contestant withdraws from the others."	The Reckless Necklace
Born to Dance (season 1)	5	Top 8	Commercials	"The dancers shoot a commercial for a vacuum cleaner, but some of them don't hold the assignment in high regard, raising Laurieann's ire."	Suck It Up
Born to Dance (season 1)	6	Top 8	Partnering	"Laurieann's favorite male dancers arrive at the studio, resulting in the lady contestants gaining a partner on the dance floor—and off it as well."	Boys Boys Boys
Born to Dance (season 1)	7	Top 6	Lady gaga auditions and head shots	"The dancers try to kick up their careers by auditioning for a Lady Gaga show. They receive makeovers and take head shots, but one contender spirals downward when she's unhappy with her look."	Born To Glam
Born to Dance (season 1)	8 (Finale)	Top 3	Lady Gaga Performance	"In the Season 1 finale, the contestants perform with songstress Lady Gaga, after which the winning dancer is named."	The Monster Ball

== Career credits ==
=== Television ===
- 2010: So You Think You Can Dance (U.S. season 7) - Vegas Week Contestant; Adechike Ballroom Partner
- 2011: 106 & Park - Guest with Laurieann Gibson & Born To Dance Top 3
- 2011: The Mo'Nique Show - Guest Dancer
- 2011: Born to Dance (TV series) - Contestant; Winner
- 2011: Shakira Latin Grammy Awards of 2011 Performance - Dancer
- 2012: Shake It Up (season 3) - Spirit Squad Member
- 2013: WDCW Young & The Throne (QC Show Segment) - Actress, "Imani"
- 2013: WDCW Queen Charis Show - Choreographer
- 2013: The Graham Norton Show - Dancer, Lady Gaga "Venus" Performance
- 2013: The X Factor UK - Dancer, Lady Gaga "Venus" Performance

=== Film ===
- 2014 : Warriors Fan Trailer (Ram Bhat) - Principle, Lizzies

=== Choreography and appearances ===
- 2003-2008: Capitol Movement Annual Dance Concert DC - Dancer, Choreographer
- 2012: Cassie "King of Hearts" Performance 106 & Park - Assistant Choreographer, Dancer
- 2013: Get Kids Movin Fitness Convention - Guest Instructor
- 2013: University of Wisconsin–Madison Move If You Want It Competition - Celebrity Judge & Instructor
- 2014: Royal The Stage Play (Chris Clanton) - Choreographer
