= Kherington Payne =

American singer

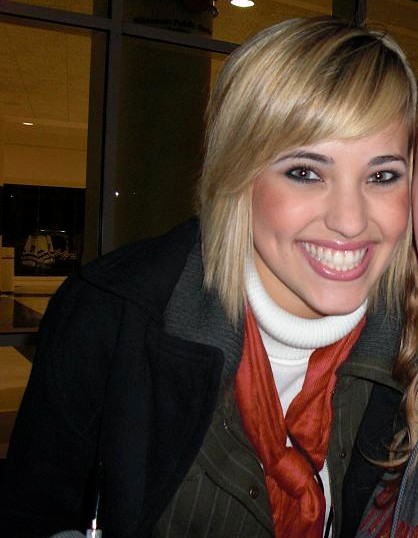
- Payne at the So You Think You Can Dance tour in Green Bay, Wisconsin; October 18, 2008

Background information
- Born: Kherington Taylor Payne; January 26, 1990 (age 36); Whittier, California, United States
- Origin: Placentia, California, United States
- Genres: R&B, hip hop
- Occupations: Dancer, actress, choreographer, television personality, singer
- Years active: 2008–present
- Label: A&M (2010-present)

Kherington Taylor Payne (born January 26, 1990) is an American dancer, actress, choreographer, television personality and singer who camas a contestant in Season 4 of the hit reality-dance show So You Think You Can Dance as the sixth female contestant and in gender the sixth overall contestant to be eliminated and in a role in the 2009 reinvention of the movie Fame. She has been a principal dancer for Katy Perry and was a lead cast member on E! reality docu-drama The Dance Scene. Payne was also briefly a member of the third line-up of the girl group The Pussycat Dolls. She was a choreographer on the YouTube show Dance Showdown.

== Personal life ==
Payne was born in Whittier, California and raised in Placentia, California. She is the daughter of Sheri Ashe (née Bigcraft). Her parents divorced when she was young, and her mother remarried. She has one younger half-sister, Delaney. She has been taking formal dance lessons since she was 2 years old at Dance Precisions, located in Placentia. She graduated from El Dorado High School on June 10, 2008. Payne specializes in contemporary jazz, and is also trained in lyrical, ballet, pointe and gymnastics. Apart from dance, she is also an avid soccer fan who has played for many years. She teaches at a local dance studio in Jacksonville Florida.

== Career ==
=== So You Think You Can Dance ===
In 2008, Payne competed on Season 4 of the hit reality-dance show So You Think You Can Dance. After being the youngest competitor selected to be a part of the Top 20 that year, the then 18-year-old contemporary/jazz dancer was paired up with hip-hop dancer Stephen 'tWitch' Boss. The duo, also known as "Twitchington", performed many memorable routines and was extremely popular with audiences. Having made the Top 10, Payne later toured the country that fall with her fellow season 4 "IV REAL" finalists.

Week	Partner	Dance	Song	Choreographer(s)	Result
1	Stephen 'tWitch' Boss	Broadway	"Too Darn Hot" from Kiss Me, Kate	Tyce Diorio	Safe
2	Stephen 'tWitch' Boss	Viennese Waltz	"A New Day Has Come"—Celine Dion	Jean-Marc Généreux and France Mousseau	Safe
3	Stephen 'tWitch' Boss	Hip-hop	"Don't Touch Me (Throw da Water on 'em)"—Busta Rhymes	Tabitha and Napoleon D'umo	Safe
4	Stephen 'tWitch' Boss	Paso Doble	"Malagueña"—Brian Setzer '68 Comeback Special	Tony Meredith and Melanie LaPatin	Safe
4	Stephen 'tWitch' Boss	Contemporary	"Dreaming With a Broken Heart"—John Mayer	Mia Michaels	Safe
5	Stephen 'tWitch' Boss	Krump	"2 Buck 4 TV"—Tha J-Squad	Lil' C	Bottom 3
5	Stephen 'tWitch' Boss	Tango	"Assassin's Tango" from Mr. and Mrs. Smith	Jean-Marc Généreux and France Mousseau	Bottom 3
5	Results show solo		"All We Are"—OneRepublic		Bottom 3
6	Mark Kanemura	Country-western two-step	"Kick Back"—Ty England	Ronnie DeBenedetta and Brandi Jobais	Eliminated
6	Mark Kanemura	Jazz	""Canned Heat"—Jamiroquai	Tyce Diorio	Eliminated
6	Performance show solo		"Breakin' Dishes"—Rihanna		Eliminated
6	Results show solo		"Myphilosophy"—Inner		Eliminated

=== Post-SYTYCD ===
After the show she went on to play a reform school girl with fellow Season 4 contestants Katee Shean and Comfort Fedoke in the "Bootylicious" number in the "Hairography" episode of the television show Glee. She later starred as Alice Ellerton in the 2009 reinvention of the movie Fame, which opened in theaters in September 2009. Payne also appeared as a checkout girl in the indie-movie musical Leading Ladies, starring Melanie LaPatin and Benji Schwimmer.

In early 2010, Payne, along Brandee Evans, performed as a backup dancer for Katy Perry at the 2010 MTV Movie Awards, and was also featured prominently in the music video for Perry's summer smash-hit 'California Gurls' as the 'Peppermint Girl'. In May, Payne was announced as a new member of the Pussycat Dolls, but her absence during later shows led many to believe that she'd left the group. In June, Payne played the role of Potiphar's wife in a production of Joseph and the Amazing Technicolor Dreamcoat, at the Lincoln Theater in Napa Valley. In early August, Payne danced with Diddy-Dirty Money at the Teen Choice Awards, to their hit track 'Hello Good Morning'.

Throughout August and September, Payne joined Katy Perry on her Teenage Dream promo tour, performing at private concerts around the world, including television appearances on The Today Show, Italy's X-Factor, Germany's Wetten, dass..? and the Season 36 season premiere of Saturday Night Live. During that time, she also performed on the American version of Dancing with the Stars for rock band Daughtry during the performance of their song 'September'. Whilst pursuing her career, Payne also teaches and assists at various dance studios and conventions in and around America.

In November, Payne performed a number of shows in Los Angeles with a girl group called Dance Recital. Payne co-starred with famous choreographer Laurieann Gibson on the E! docu-drama, The Dance Scene in 2011. The series followed Gibson and her dancers as they lived and worked in the LA dance/entertainment industry. The show first premiered April 10 on the E! Network in the United States, and has since been broadcast in many countries around the world.

In early 2011, Payne appeared in the romantic comedy film No Strings Attached as a 'frat party dancer'. In February 2011, she appeared as a featured dancer on an episode of CSI: Crime Scene Investigation titled "All That Cremains." Later that month she performed with Katy Perry on the 53rd Annual Grammy Awards. In September, she made her second appearance on Dancing with the Stars as part of Macy’s Stars of Dance in a Busby Berkeley-inspired number choreographed by Marguerite Derricks, who had previously choreographed Payne in Fame. In late 2011, she also appeared in commercials for Shoe Carnival and Ford.

In 2012, she served as a choreographer and a dancer on Season 1 of the YouTube show Dance Showdown, which she and her YouTube gamer, commentator, partner Matthew Woodworth eventually won based on viewers' votes. In April, she appeared on Dancing with the Stars dancing for Selena Gomez. In June, Payne played Frenchie in Napa Valley Broadway Playhouse's debut production, Cabaret at the Napa Valley Opera House. In July, she made a guest appearance on an episode True Blood titled "We'll Meet Again" in the role of Angelica. In September, Payne danced for Pink at the 2012 MTV Video Music Awards and the IHeartRadio Music Festival.

In early 2013, Payne appeared as a showgirl dancer on the crime period drama Vegas. In June, Payne was featured as a showgirl in the closing musical number in the HBO movie Behind the Candelabra, and also made a brief cameo appearance in a music video for legendary musician Herb Alpert to his cover of Puttin' on the Ritz, choreographed by Tabitha and Napoleon D'umo. Payne will star as Mary in the indie drama Bravetown alongside Lucas Till and Jae Head. The film is produced by Buffalo Gal Pictures and is released in 2015. Payne also starred as Sasha in a New Zealand film titled Born to Dance.

== Filmography ==
Filmography
Year	Title	Role
2009	Fame	Alice Ellerton
2009	Glee	Jane Adams Choir Dancer
2010	Leading Ladies	Checkout Girl
2011	No Strings Attached	Frat Party Dancer
2011	The Dance Scene	Herself
2011	CSI	Dancer
2012	True Blood	Angelica
2013	Vegas	Dancer
2013	Behind the Candelabra	Showgirl
2014	Sins of Our Youth	DJ
2015	Bravetown	Mary
2015	Born to Dance	Sasha

=== Music videos ===
2010: California Gurls - Peppermint Dancer
