= Revenge (Muni Long album) =

Studio album by Muni Long
- Released: August 30, 2024
- Genre: R&B
- Length: 42:49
- Labels: Muni Long; Def Jam
- Producers: Biako; Tommy Brown; Bryan-Michael Cox; Jermaine Dupri; Mr. Franks; Jeff Gitelman; Jehreeus; Muni Long; Mombru; The Mosley Brothers; Smoko Ono; OG Parker; Tommy Parker; Tee Romano; G. Ry; Sean Spencer; Tricky Stewart; Sam Sumser; Kevin Theodore; Josh Thomas; Theron Thomas; Yonatan Watts; Justus West; Jordan XL

Muni Long chronology
Public Displays of Affection: The Album (2022)	Revenge (2024)

Singles from Revenge
- 1. "Made for Me" Released: September 15, 2023; 2. "Make Me Forget" Released: May 31, 2024; 3. "Ruined Me" Released: July 26, 2024; 4. "Superpowers" Released: 2025

Revenge is the fourth studio album by American singer Muni Long. It was released on August 30, 2024, through The Muni Long Inc. and Def Jam Recordings. Technically her fourth overall but her second under the Muni Long name, the singer worked with Tricky Stewart on most of the material, who would end up executive producing Revenge alongside Long. Additional collaborators include Jeff "Gitty" Gitelman, Tommy Brown, Theron Makiel Thomas, Jermaine Dupri and Bryan-Michael Cox.

The album earned generally positive reviews from music critics some of whom called it one of the best R&B albums of the year, most of them praising Revenge as a "songwriting showcase." While Revenge failed to chart on the US Billboard 200, it debuted and peaked at number eight on the US Top Heatseekers chart, becoming Long's second consecutive top ten album on the chart. The album was preceded by lead single "Made for Me" which became a top 20 hit on the US Billboard Hot 100 as well as follow-up "Make Me Forget," Long's first number-one single on the Adult R&B Songs chart. At the 67th Annual Grammy Awards, Revenge was nominated for Best R&B Album.

== Promotion ==
The first single to be released from Revenge was "Made for Me." The R&B ballad became Long's second top 20 hit on the US Billboard Hot 100, following 2021's "Hrs and Hrs," and produced a number of remixes that were released, including ones with Lil Jon and Kronic, Bnyx, and Mariah Carey, among others. Certified Platinum by the Recording Industry Association of America (RIAA) on May 22, 2024, the song received a nomination for the Viewer's Choice Award at the 2024 BET Awards.

"Make Me Forget" was issued by The Muni Long Inc. and Def Jam Recordings as the album's second single on May 31, 2024. Interpolating from singer D’Angelo's 2000 single "Untitled (How Does It Feel)," complemented by finger-snaps and a slinky bassline, the song — after two previous number two singles with "Hrs and Hrs" and "Made for Me" — became Long's first number one hit on Billboard's Adult R&B Songs chart. A third single, "Ruined Me," was released on July 26, 2024.

== Critical reception ==
Professional ratings
Review scores
Source	Rating
Entertainment Focus	5/5 stars

Billboard editor Gail Mitchell noted that "from start to finish, Revenge brims with frank, raw emotion and relatable scenarios." Her colleague Jason Lipshutz found that "Long has happily returned sooner than later with Revenge, which follows 2022’s Public Displays of Affection: The Album as another R&B songwriting showcase, highlighted by the electric recent hit "Made for Me". Caroline Fisher from HotNewHipHop felt that "on the 14-track project, [Long] delivers all of the honesty and emotion one would expect while putting both her growth as an artist and as a person on full display." Entertainment Focus critic Pip Ellwood-Hughes felt that Revenge was "the strongest R&B record, and one of the strongest records of any genre, to be released in 2024 so far [...] Long is one of the only R&B stars in the modern era that can do it all; she can sing the hell out of any song, she can write killer hooks and she never gives anything less than 100% in a live performance. Revenge should be a huge record for her and by rights, Long should be the biggest R&B star in the world."

== Commercial performance ==
Revenge debuted and peaked at number eight on the US Top Heatseekers chart in the week of September 14, 2024, becoming Long's second consecutive album to reach the top ten of the chart.

== Track listing ==
Revenge track listing
No.	Title	Writer(s)	Producer(s)	Length
1.	"Superpowers"	Priscilla Renea; Ben Parris; Brian McKnight; Christopher Stewart	Tricky Stewart; Parris	3:38
2.	"Made for Me"	Renea; Bryan-Michael Cox; Jermaine Dupri; Jordan Orvosh	Cox; Dupri; Jordan XL	3:06
3.	"Make Me Forget"	Renea; Christian Mombru; Stewart; Jariuce Banks; Michael Archer; Raphael Saadiq	Stewart; Mombru; Jehreeus	3:58
4.	"30s"	Renea; Stephen Wilkinson; Jordan Mosley; Justin Mosley	The Mosley Brothers	2:51
5.	"Revenge"	Renea; Parris; Stewart; Sergio van Gonter; Terius Gesteelde-Diamant; Theron Thomas	Stewart; Parris	4:14
6.	"Reverse" (Interlude)	Renea; Antoine Reed; Cedric Woosley; Derrick Hill; Eliot Dubock; Evan Ingersoll; Jordan Houston; Michael Crabtree; Nicolas Foster; Paul Beauregard	Muni Long	1:18
7.	"Bessie"	Renea; Sam Sumser; Sean Spencer; T. Thomas	Stewart; T. Thomas; Sumser; Spencer; Parris	2:43
8.	"Played Yourself"	Renea; Andrew Hitt; Parris; Stewart; Jake Krumm; Jared Krumm; T. Thomas	Stewart; Parris	2:46
9.	"Leave My Baby Tonight" (featuring GloRilla)	Renea; Bob Robinson; Clarence Redd III; Gloria Woods; Joshua Parker; Ryan Martinez; Sean Combs; Stephayne Maxwell; Terence Williams; Terrance Kelly; Tim Kelly	Tee Romano; OG Parker; G. Ry	3:16
10.	"Things I Never Said"	Renea; Darian Garcia; Itai Shapira; Thomas Lumpkins	Biako; Smoko Ono; Tommy Parker	2:49
11.	"Type Questions"	Renea; Jacob Kasher Hindlin; Jeff Gitelman; Kevin Theodore	Gitelman	2:38
12.	"The Baddest"	Renea; Diamonté Harper; Joelle James	Stewart; Tommy Brown; Mr. Franks; Justus West; Parris; Muni Long	3:38
13.	"Waste No Time"	Renea; Josh Thomas; Brown; Yonatan Watts	Brown; J. Thomas; Watts	2:53
14.	"Ruined Me"	Renea; Gitelman; Naji Lomax; Theodore	Gitelman; Theodore	3:16
Total length:				42:49

Sample credits

- "Superpowers" samples from Brian McKnight's "The Only One for Me" (1997)
- "Make Me Forget" interpolates from D’Angelo's "Untitled (How Does It Feel)" (2000)
- "Leave My Baby Tonight" samples from 112 and Mr. Cheeks's "Come See Me" (1996)

== Charts ==
Weekly chart performance for Revenge
Chart (2024)	Peak position
US Heatseekers Albums (Billboard)	8

== Release history ==
Revenge release history
Region	Date	Format	Label	Ref(s)
Various	August 30, 2024	CD; digital download; streaming	Muni Long; Def Jam	
