= District Heights, Maryland =

City in Maryland, United States

- City
- Flag Seal

- Location of District Heights, Maryland
- Coordinates: 38°51′34″N 76°53′21″W
- Country: United States of America
- State: Maryland
- County: Prince George's
- Incorporated: 1936

Area
  - Total: 0.86 sq mi (2.24 km^{2})
  - Land: 0.86 sq mi (2.24 km^{2})
  - Water: 0 sq mi (0.00 km^{2})
- Elevation: 266 ft (81 m)

Population (2020)
  - Total: 5,959
  - Density: 6,888.7/sq mi (2,659.75/km^{2})
- Time zone: UTC-5 (EST)
  - Summer (DST): UTC-4 (EDT)
- ZIP codes: 20747, 20753
- Area codes: 301, 240
- FIPS code: 24-23025
- GNIS feature ID: 0597330
- Website: www.districtheights.org

District Heights is an incorporated municipality in Prince George's County, Maryland, United States, located near Maryland Route 4. Per the 2020 census, the population was 5,959. For more information, see the separate articles on Forestville and Suitland.

District Heights is located 9.85 miles (15.85 km) from central Washington.

== Geography ==
District Heights is located at 38°51′34″N 76°53′21″W (38.859545, −76.889139).

According to the United States Census Bureau, the city has a total area of 0.93 square miles (2.41 km^{2}), all land.

== History ==
District Heights was originally farmland owned by Major Leander P. Williams, purchased as four patented Lord Baltimore tracts known as: "Good Luck," "Magruder's Plains Enlarged," "the Levels," and "Offutt's Adventure." Under grants issued to Lord Baltimore by King Charles I of Great Britain, the tracts belonged to Colonel Ninian Beall, Benjamin Berry, and Alexander Magruder. District Heights evolved from one of the four patents. In 1925, 505-acres of the Williams farm was purchased and formed into the District Heights Company by Joseph Tepper, David L. Blanken, Henry Oxenberg, Gilbert Leventhal, Simon Gordon, and Simon Gerber. The land was farmed by Walter and Al Dustin, whose farmhouse stood at 7116 Foster Street. By 1925, streets laid out first three blocks of Halleck Street and Aztec. By 1926, the city had approximately 25 homes built, two businesses, a grocery store and filling station, a pump house and water tower to furnish the water and pressure for the City, a sewage system and a free Model T bus service to 17th and Pennsylvania Avenue, S.E. The Town of District Heights was incorporated in 1936 and recognized by act of the Maryland General Assembly. Many of the Cape Cod style houses seen today date to the 1940s, when several developers constructed affordable, single-family, houses with financing from the Federal Housing Administration (FHA), anticipating sales to federal employees and veterans returning from World War II. In 1946, the remaining and undeveloped 300-acres was bought and developed by New York City builder Samuel R. Rosoff, who established Washington Estates, Inc., thus adding additional tracts to District Heights which include areas now occupied by garden apartments.

== Adjacent areas ==
- Walker Mill (north)
- Forestville (southeast)
- Capitol Heights (northwest)
- Morningside (south)

== Demographics ==
Historical population
| Census | Pop. | Note | %± |
|---|---|---|---|
| 1940 | 32 | | — |
| 1950 | 1,735 | | 5,321.9% |
| 1960 | 7,524 | | 333.7% |
| 1970 | 7,846 | | 4.3% |
| 1980 | 6,799 | | −13.3% |
| 1990 | 6,704 | | −1.4% |
| 2000 | 5,958 | | −11.1% |
| 2010 | 5,837 | | −2.0% |
| 2020 | 5,959 | | 2.1% |
U.S. Decennial Census; 2010 2020

=== Racial and ethnic composition ===
District Heights city, Maryland – Racial and ethnic composition Note: the US Census treats Hispanic/Latino as an ethnic category. This table excludes Latinos from the racial categories and assigns them to a separate category. Hispanics/Latinos may be of any race.
| Race / Ethnicity (NH = Non-Hispanic) | Pop 2000 | Pop 2010 | Pop 2020 | % 2000 | % 2010 | % 2020 |
|---|---|---|---|---|---|---|
| White alone (NH) | 543 | 244 | 136 | 9.11% | 4.18% | 2.28% |
| Black or African American alone (NH) | 5,228 | 5,224 | 5,030 | 87.75% | 89.50% | 84.41% |
| Native American or Alaska Native alone (NH) | 7 | 13 | 27 | 0.12% | 0.22% | 0.45% |
| Asian alone (NH) | 51 | 35 | 39 | 0.86% | 0.60% | 0.65% |
| Native Hawaiian or Pacific Islander alone (NH) | 0 | 0 | 3 | 0.00% | 0.00% | 0.05% |
| Other race alone (NH) | 5 | 10 | 23 | 0.08% | 0.17% | 0.39% |
| Mixed race or Multiracial (NH) | 95 | 97 | 143 | 1.59% | 1.66% | 2.40% |
| Hispanic or Latino (any race) | 29 | 214 | 558 | 0.49% | 3.67% | 9.36% |
| Total | 5,958 | 5,837 | 5,959 | 100.00% | 100.00% | 100.00% |

=== 2020 census ===
As of the 2020 census, District Heights had a population of 5,959. The median age was 37.5 years. 23.6% of residents were under the age of 18 and 16.3% were 65 years of age or older. For every 100 females, there were 83.1 males, and for every 100 females age 18 and over, there were 76.7 males age 18 and over.

100.0% of residents lived in urban areas, while 0.0% lived in rural areas.

There were 2,111 households, of which 36.0% had children under the age of 18 living in them. Of all households, 30.5% were married-couple households, 17.2% were households with a male householder and no spouse or partner present, and 47.3% were households with a female householder and no spouse or partner present. About 24.5% of all households were made up of individuals and 9.2% had someone living alone who was 65 years of age or older.

There were 2,201 housing units, of which 4.1% were vacant. The homeowner vacancy rate was 1.6% and the rental vacancy rate was 3.6%.

=== 2010 Census ===
As of the census of 2010, there were 5,837 people, 2,050 households, and 1,505 families residing in the city. The population density was 6,276.3 inhabitants per square mile (2,423.3/km^{2}). There were 2,212 housing units at an average density of 2,378.5 per square mile (918.3/km^{2}). The racial makeup of the city was 6.0% White, 90.1% African American, 0.2% Native American, 0.6% Asian, 1.1% from other races, and 1.9% from two or more races. Hispanic or Latino of any race were 3.7% of the population.

There were 2,050 households, of which 40.4% had children under the age of 18 living with them, 35.0% were married couples living together, 32.8% had a female householder with no husband present, 5.7% had a male householder with no wife present, and 26.6% were non-families. 22.5% of all households were made up of individuals, and 5.7% had someone living alone who was 65 years of age or older. The average household size was 2.85 and the average family size was 3.31.

The median age in the city was 35.8 years. 26.3% of residents were under the age of 18; 10.9% were between the ages of 18 and 24; 24.5% were from 25 to 44; 28.3% were from 45 to 64; and 10% were 65 years of age or older. The gender makeup of the city was 46.0% male and 54.0% female.

=== 2000 Census ===
As of the census of 2000, there were 5,958 people, 2,070 households, and 1,538 families residing in the city. The population density was 6,649.1 inhabitants per square mile (2,567.2/km^{2}). There were 2,170 housing units at an average density of 2,421.7 per square mile (935.0/km^{2}). The racial makeup of the city was 9.20% White, 87.95% African American, 0.12% Native American, 0.86% Asian, 0.20% from other races, and 1.68% from two or more races. Hispanic or Latino of any race were 0.49% of the population.

There were 2,070 households, out of which 38.3% had children under the age of 18 living with them, 39.6% were married couples living together, 28.2% had a female householder with no husband present, and 25.7% were non-families. 22.1% of all households were made up of individuals, and 5.0% had someone living alone who was 65 years of age or older. The average household size was 2.88 and the average family size was 3.36.

In the city, the population was spread out, with 30.8% under the age of 18, 8.3% from 18 to 24, 29.3% from 25 to 44, 23.6% from 45 to 64, and 8.0% who were 65 years of age or older. The median age was 34 years. For every 100 females, there were 84.9 males. For every 100 females age 18 and over, there were 76.1 males.

The median income for a household in the city was $52,331, and the median income for a family was $61,220. Males had a median income of $37,129 versus $32,443 for females. The per capita income for the city was $21,190. About 4.5% of families and 5.9% of the population were below the poverty line, including 9.0% of those under age 18 and 6.1% of those age 65 or over.

== Notable people ==
- NaVorro Bowman, former professional football player, Oakland Raiders and San Francisco 49ers
- Francis Bryant Concannon (1947-1967), PFC, U. S. Army, Infantry, killed in action, Pleiku province, Vietnam.
- David Michael Crawford, former major in the Prince George’s County Police Department and former police chief in Laurel and District Heights, who was convicted of arson for setting 13 fires in five Maryland counties over the course of nearly a decade, between 2011-2020, before he was caught in 2021 and later sentenced to more than eight life sentences.
- East Coast Rapist, Aaron H. Thomas, lived in District Heights/Forestville from June 1994 to August 2006
- Jack D'Ambrosio, retired police officer, author of "The Apollos" (2009) and "Angels with Dirty Faces" (2010), which give accounts of teenage gangs, gang activities and culture in District Heights during the 1950s and early 1960s.
- Margot K. Frank, Russian Studies Prof, PhD Georgetown University, taught at Randolph-Macon Women's College (1969-1993).
- Jane Campbell Hutchison, former art history professor, University of Wisconsin–Madison
- Thomas Weldon Jones (1947-1967), SP4, U.S. Army, Infantry, killed in action, Binh Thuan province, Vietnam.
- John Francis Pender (1946-1967), HM, U. S. Navy, Marine Corpsman, killed in action, Quang Tri province, Vietnam.
- Ronald Edward Stoker (1950-1969), PFC, U. S. Army, Infantry, killed in action Tay Ninh province, Vietnam.
- LaTonya Swann, winner of BET's Born To Dance
- Lloyd R. Woodson, arrested in 2010 with military-grade illegal weapons he intended to use in a violent crime, and a detailed map of the Fort Drum military installation

== Government ==
The city is governed by a mayor and city commission elected every 4 years. The current elected mayor and city commission are: Mayor Cynthia Miller Commissioner Anthony B. Tilghman (Ward 1); Commissioner Xander Harcourt - (Ward 1) Commissioner Gyasi Gomez (Ward 2); Commissioner Pamela Janifer (Ward 2)

In June 2019, Mayor Martin was charged with misdemeanor misconduct in office for helping a friend buy $50,000 in fireworks only available to cities and those with a federal explosive license by asserting on city letterhead that they were for the city's Fourth of July celebration rather than for private use. This followed Martin's earlier charge of misconduct in office in 2013 (Circuit Court Case Number: CJ135672).

The U.S. Postal Service operates the District Heights Post Office (Zip Code 20747) in an unincorporated area next to the city limits. The post office is named for former and longtime town mayor E. Michael Roll, who championed its establishment.

== History of Mayors ==
- 1954-1956 L.T. Gates
- 1956-1957 Thomas R. McEntegart
- 1957-1963 E. Michael Roll
- 1963-1965 Thomas R. McEntegart
- 1965-1981 E. Michael Roll
- 1981-1983 David H. Goldsmith
- 1983-1985 William E. Hay
- 1985-1987 David H. Goldsmith
- 1987-1988 David W. Joy
- 1988-1990 Charles L. Hudson
- 1990-1991 Thomas S. Morrison
- 1991-1997 Mary A. Pumphrey
- 1997-2003 Jack C. Sims
- 2003-2006 Carol D. Johnson
- 2006-2016 James L. Walls, Jr. (died May 12, 2016)
- 2016-2018 Jack C. Sims
- 2018-2019 Eddie L. Martin (suspended Dec. 2, 2019)
- 2019-2020 Johnathan Medlock, Acting Mayor
- 2020-2022 Johnathan Medlock
- 2022- Cynthia Miller

== Law enforcement ==
The District Heights Police Department (DHPD) is the primary law enforcement agency for the City of District Heights which is located in Prince George's County, Maryland. An agreement exists with Prince George's County Police Department and the Prince George's County Sheriff's Office that outlines mutual aid assistance. Assistance is also provided by neighboring municipal agencies.

Officers serve the City Commission and the citizens who reside in and around the Municipal Corporation of District Heights. District Heights is located within the 8th District of the Prince George's County Police Department. The two agencies work closely together responding to calls for service as well as solving crimes. Although the crime rate as reported by the Federal Bureau of Investigation is twenty~two percent higher than the national average, this number represents both the non-corporate and corporate portions of District Heights.

The District Heights Police Department began in 1936. Over the years, it has seen many different officers. In 2012, Chief Michael March (Ret) retired, sparking the City Commission to temporarily appoint Chief (Fmr) Yolanda Alexander. Chief Alexander served as acting Chief for more than a year until she was fully sworn in as Chief of Police in October 2013. Her contract as Chief for the District Heights Police Department was not renewed after May 2014 City Mayoral and Commission elections. Several members stated a difference of opinion. Chief Elliott Gibson was hired in May 2014, as Police Chief. Chief Gibson had a long history and experience in law enforcement. Chief Gibson received numerous commendations and awards for his community service during his tenure. Chief Gibson was terminated by the City Commission after new Commissioners were elected in May 2019. The police department was overseen by the District 8 Commander and Asst. Commander of the Prince George's County Police Department until November 2020 when Interim Chief Kinsey Weems was appointed. Chief Weems has been a member of the agency since 2013.

In March 2021, numerous fire and police agencies announced the arrest of former District Heights Police Chief David Michael Crawford in connection to a dozen fires between 2011 and 2020. In March 2022 Crawford entered an Alford plea to one count of first-degree arson for setting a garage in Jefferson, Frederick County, ablaze on April 3, 2018, while the occupants of the attached home were in bed; he awaits sentencing while active arson cases against Crawford in Montgomery, Howard, and Prince George's counties continue.

Prince George's County Police Department District 8 Station in Upper Marlboro CDP serves the community.

== Fire Department/Emergency Medical Services ==
District Heights is served by the District Heights Volunteer Fire Department, Prince George's Fire Company 826, providing fire, rescue, and ambulance services. Located at 5900 Marlboro Pike, the station is named after Retired Chief Thomas "Tommy" Stommel, who served as a firefighter for 50 years and Volunteer Chief for over 40 years. The modern station was dedicated in October 2008. The old brick-built fire house still stands repurposed at the corner of 6208 Marlboro Pike and Scott Key Drive.

== Education ==
The city is served by the Prince George's County Public Schools and District 7 of the County's Board of Education.

Elementary schools that serve the city include:

- District Heights Elementary School
  - Formerly included District Heights Parkway Elementary, whose building makes up half the current school, and which fed primary grades to District Heights Elementary following 2nd or 3rd grade
- North Forestville Elementary School

Middle schools that serve the city include:

- Drew-Freeman Middle School (7–8)
- Walker Mill Middle School

High schools that serve the city include:

- Dr. Henry A. Wise Jr. High School
- Suitland High School

Francis Scott Key Elementary School is neither in the city, nor serves the city, but has a District Heights postal address. The district previously operated Berkshire Elementary School in what is now Suitland CDP, near District Heights. Berkshire Elementary closed in 2009.

== Public libraries ==
The Prince George's County Memorial Library System operates the Spauldings Branch Library near District Heights. The library opened to the public in 1987 and is named after the area's original 19th century Spaldings election district (which changed in spelling to Spauldings in the 20th century when the election district was reapportioned).

== Public Spaces ==
There are several public spaces and parks within the District Heights locale, these include sports recreational fields adjacent to the Municipal Center on Marbury Drive, an outdoor athletic exercise area along District Heights Parkway, the Hartman-Berkshire Park on Walters Lane, green spaces along the length of Kipling Parkway, and a 2021 dedicated Veteran's Memorial Park at the junction of Marbury Drive and Kipling Parkway. There is also a neighborhood mini-park on Lakehurst Street in North Forestville and a small Maryland National Capital Park next to the North Forestville Elementary School.

== Transportation ==
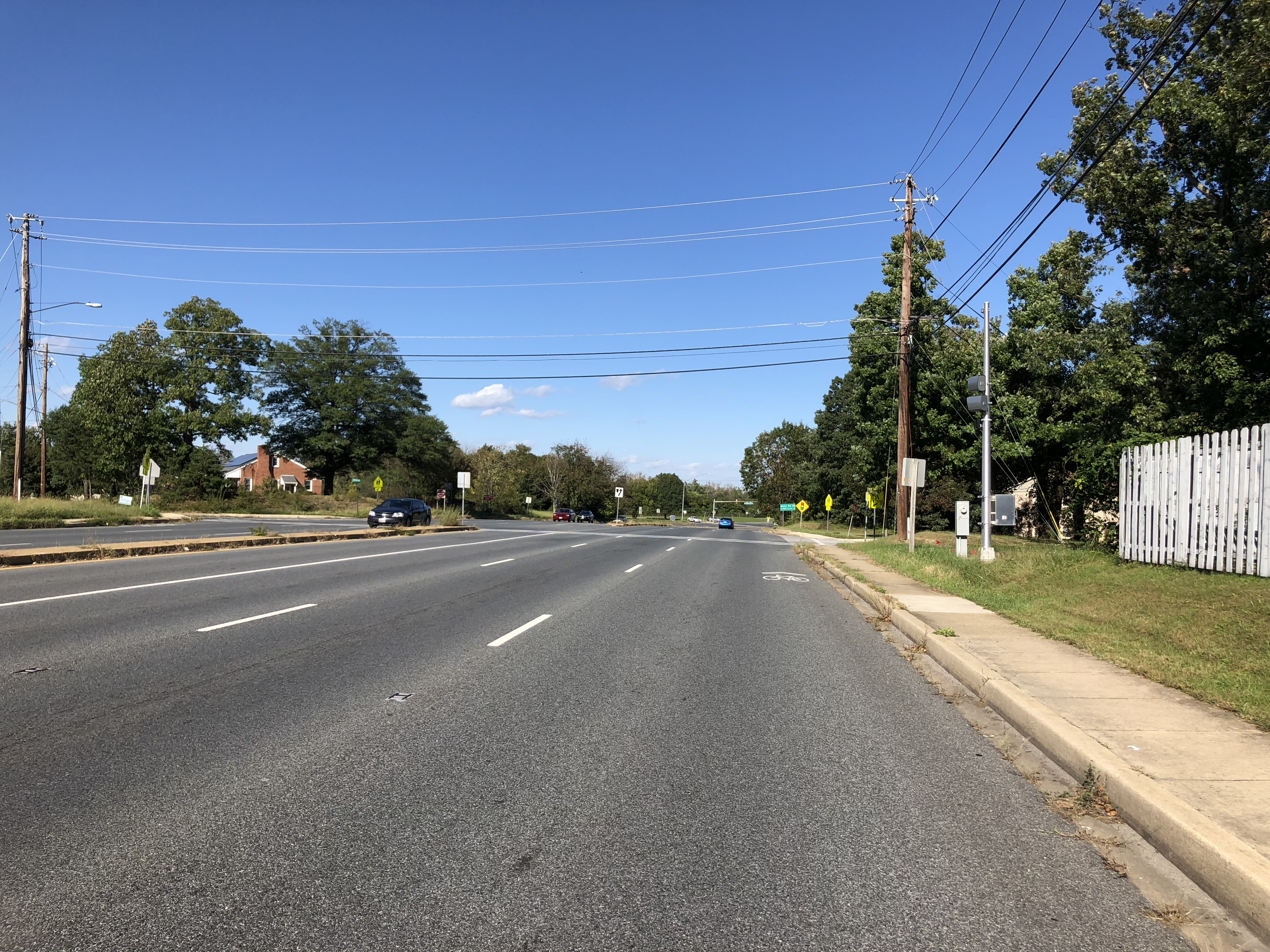
MD 458 in District Heights

The only highway passing directly through District Heights is Maryland Route 458. MD 458 connects southwest to Maryland Route 5, which provides access to Washington, D.C., and Interstate 95/Interstate 495 (Capital Beltway). The Washington Metropolitan Area Transit Authority (Metro Bus) serves the town via The District Heights–Suitland Line, designated Route V12; the District Heights–Seat Pleasant Line, designated Route V14; the Marlboro Pike Line, designated Route J12; and the Forestville Line, designated as Route K12.
