= Yonatan Watts =

Canadian record producer and songwriter

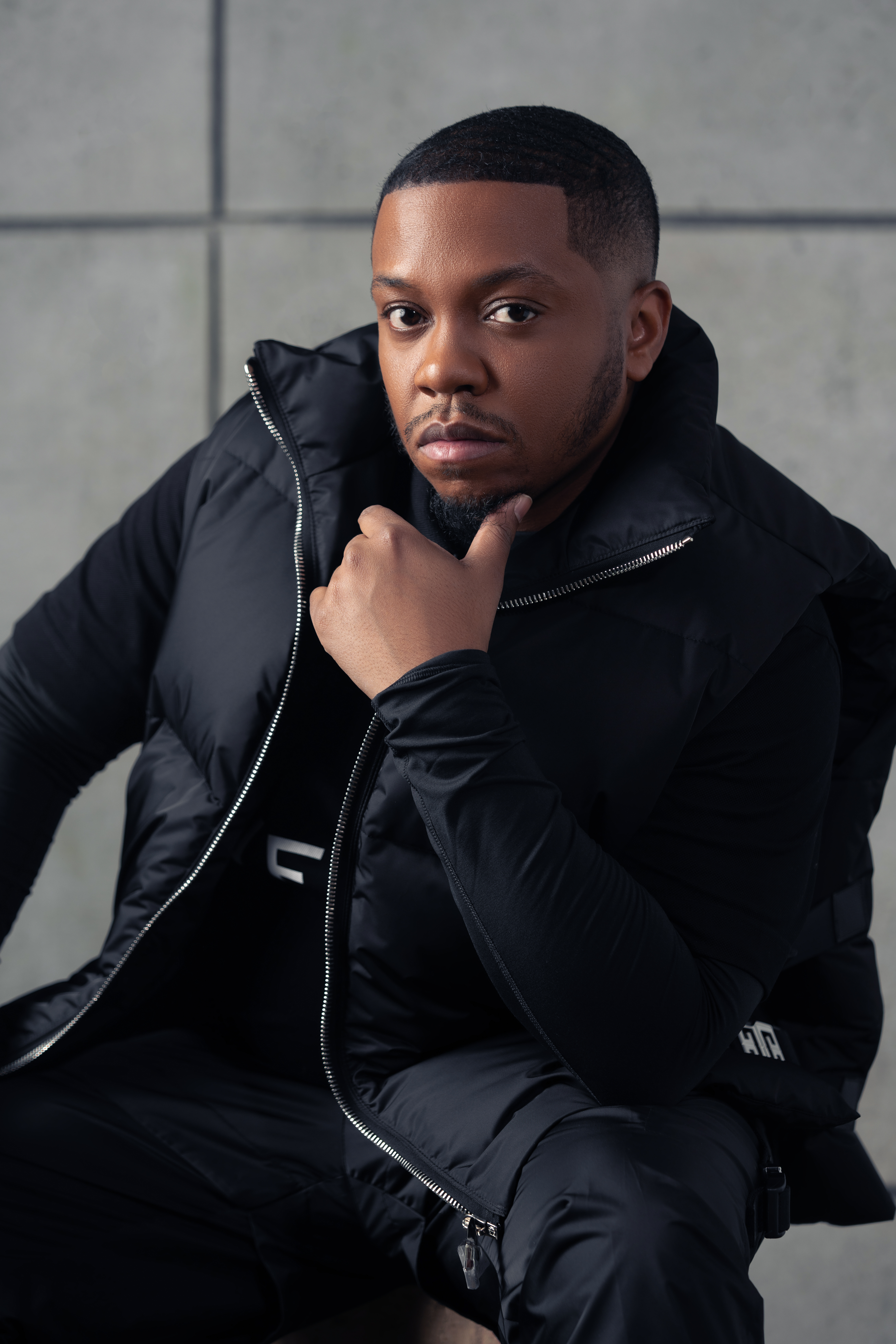
- Yonatan Watts in 2023

Background information
- Origin: Toronto, Ontario, Canada
- Genres: R&B; Hip hop; Pop
- Occupations: Record producer; Songwriter
- Years active: c. 2010s–present

Yonatan Watts is a Canadian record producer and songwriter based in Los Angeles, California. He has written and produced music for artists including Chris Brown, Ariana Grande, Coi Leray, Muni Long, Ari Lennox, French Montana, and Leigh-Anne. In January 2023, he signed a worldwide publishing agreement with Position Music through a joint venture with Tommy Brown's Champagne Therapy Music Group.

== Early life ==
Watts grew up in Toronto and, as a teenager, competed as a singing contestant on Canadian Idol.He performed in a vocal trio and reached the show's Top 100 before being eliminated ahead of the duet rounds, before shifting his focus to production. He subsequently relocated from Toronto to New York City to pursue work in the recording industry.

== Career ==
=== New York ===
In New York, Watts worked for roughly eight years as an R&B and pop engineer at Platinum Sound Studios. During this period he connected with producer Murda Beatz at a SOCAN industry event, and later met producer Tommy Brown, who encouraged him to build out his own production team.

=== Los Angeles and industry recognition ===
Watts relocated to Los Angeles to focus on production work. He is credited as a co-producer on "Main Thing," a track from the deluxe edition of Ariana Grande's 2020 album Positions — his first collaboration with Tommy Brown. He went on to contribute writing and production work to Chris Brown's albums Breezy (2022), nominated for Best R&B Album at the 65th Annual Grammy Awards (2023), and 11:11 (2023), whose deluxe edition won Best R&B Album at the 67th Annual Grammy Awards (2025). He is currently working with fellow Canadian producer The BLK LT$.

=== Publishing deal ===
In January 2023, Watts signed a worldwide publishing agreement with Position Music, arranged through a joint venture between Position Music and Tommy Brown's Champagne Therapy Music Group. The deal was announced by Position Music CEO Tyler Bacon and Brown.

== Selected songwriting and production credits ==
Credits are courtesy of Discogs, Tidal, Apple Music, and AllMusic.

Title	Year	Artist	Album
"Main Thing"	2020	Ariana Grande	Positions
"In The City"	2022	Chris Brown	Breezy
"Waste No Time"	2024	Muni Long	Revenge
"Where There's Smoke..."	2024	Jordin Sparks	No Restrictions
"Won't Keep You Waiting" (featuring Mario)	2024	Chris Brown	11:11
"Back in Style" (interlude)	2024	French Montana	Mac & Cheese 5
"Burning Up"	2025	Leigh-Anne	My Ego Told Me To

=== Selected engineering and recording credits ===
Credits are courtesy of Discogs, Tidal, Apple Music, and AllMusic.

Title	Year	Artist	Label
Shea Butter Baby	2019	Ari Lennox	Dreamville; Interscope
