= Muni Long =

American singer (born 1988)

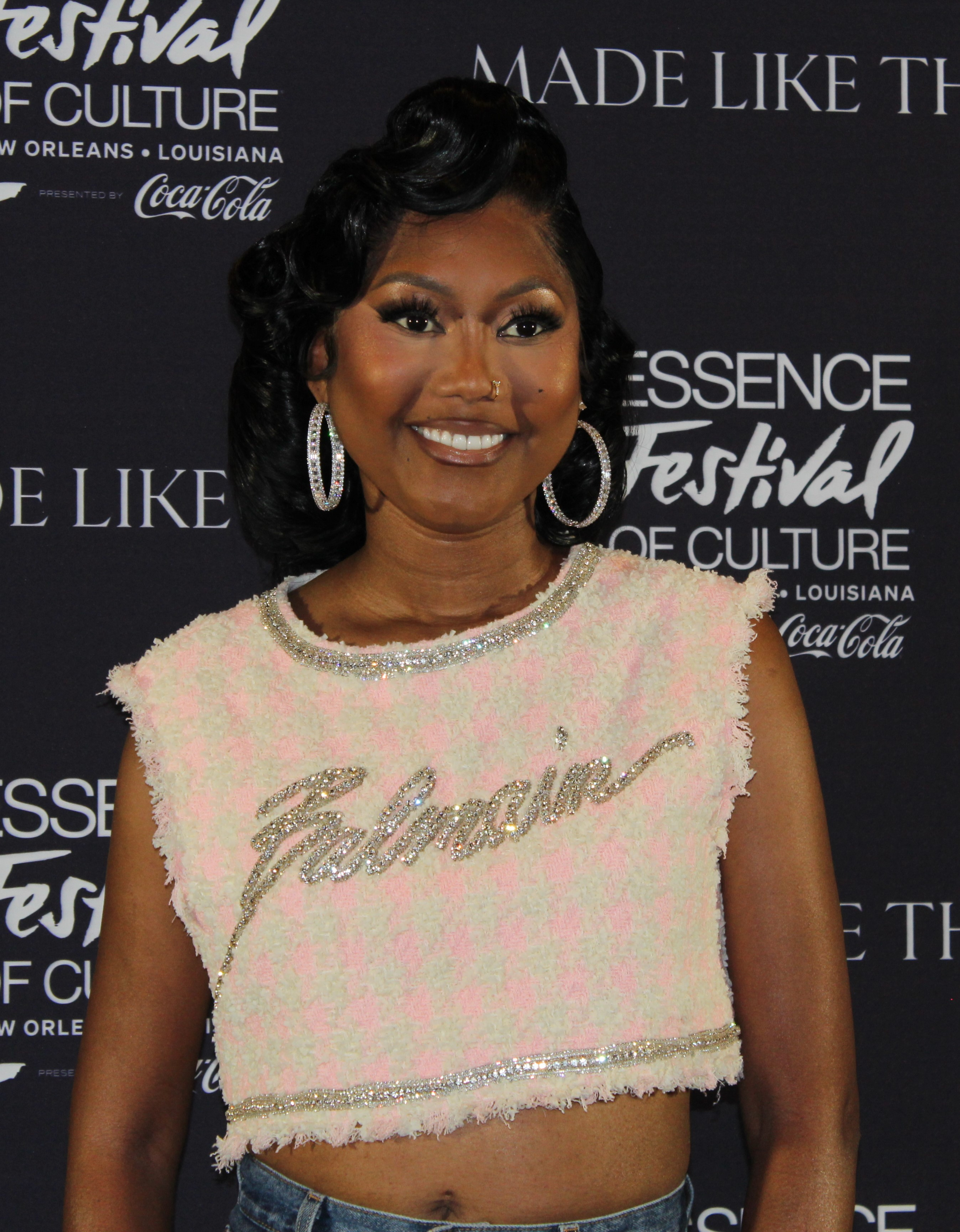
- Long at EssenceFest 2025 in July.

Background information
- Born: Priscilla Renea Hamilton; September 14, 1988 (age 38); Gifford, Florida, U.S.
- Genres: R&B; pop; soul
- Occupations: Singer; songwriter
- Years active: 2008–present
- Labels: Def Jam; White Rose Garden; Thirty Tigers; Supergiant; Capitol; Virgin
- Children: 1
- Website: munilong.com

Priscilla Renea Hamilton (born September 14, 1988), known professionally as Muni Long (pronounced "money long"; formerly known as Priscilla Renea), is an American singer and songwriter from Gifford, Florida. Under her birth name, she signed with Capitol Records to release her debut studio album Jukebox (2009), which was met with positive critical reception despite limited commercial attention. She then spent the following decade co-writing songs for other artists, namely the singles "Promise This" by Cheryl, "California King Bed" by Rihanna, "Worth It" by Fifth Harmony, "Love So Soft" by Kelly Clarkson, "Imagine" by Ariana Grande, "Who Says" by Selena Gomez & the Scene, and the global hit "Timber" by Pitbull.

She returned to her recording career in 2018, self-releasing her second studio album, Coloured, in June of that year. She adopted the stage name Muni Long the following year, and saw a commercial breakthrough with her 2021 single "Hrs and Hrs". A sleeper hit, the song peaked within the top 20 of the Billboard Hot 100, led her to sign with Def Jam Recordings, and won Best R&B Performance at the 65th Annual Grammy Awards. Furthermore, it served as lead single for her third album, Public Displays of Affection: The Album (2022), which entered the Billboard 200. Her 2023 single, "Made for Me", was met with similar success and also peaked within the Billboard Hot 100's top 20; it preceded her fourth album, Revenge (2024), which was nominated for Best R&B Album at the 67th Annual Grammy Awards.

She has received three other Grammy Award nominations throughout her career: Best New Artist, Best R&B Song ("Hrs & Hrs"), and Album of the Year for her work on Back of My Mind (2021) by H.E.R.

== Early life ==
Priscilla Renea Hamilton was born on September 14, 1988 on her grandparents' farm in Indian River County's rural Gifford neighborhood west of Vero Beach, Florida, and graduated from Vero Beach High School in 2006. Her father was a member of the Navy. She has stated she began singing at age two but was uncomfortable singing around people until she was older. She also was a part of a church's choir. She later stumbled upon YouTube and began posting videos of herself singing in her room. Her first video was a rendition of "Cry Me a River" she submitted to a contest whose winner would sing with Justin Timberlake at the Grammy Awards, albeit she did not win. She recorded videos of herself singing the dictionary and made her own songs independently. Her channel eventually received over 30,000 subscriptions and she was given the opportunity to participate in MTV's Say What? Karaoke.

== Career ==
=== 2009–2010: Career beginnings and Jukebox ===
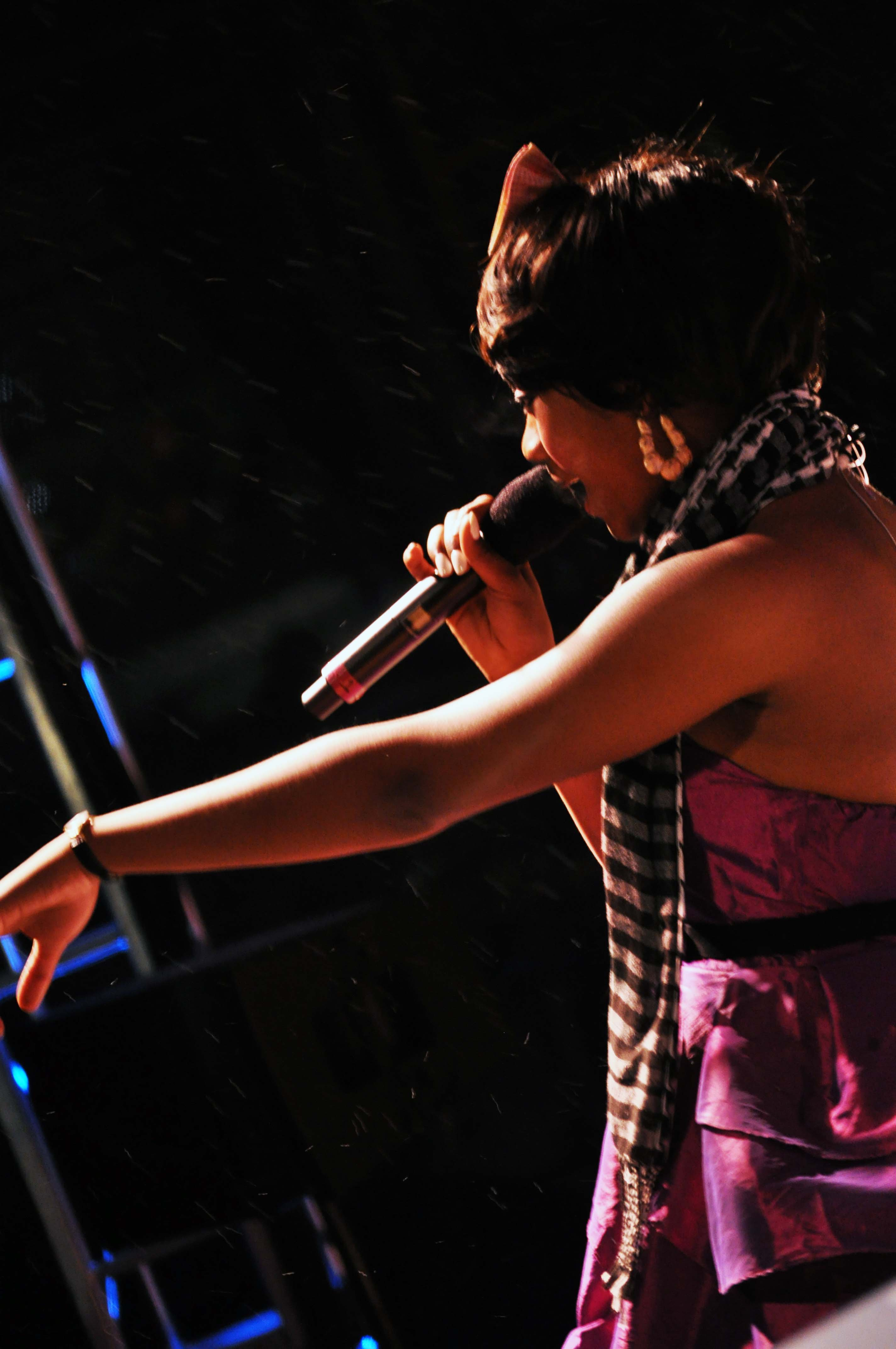
Muni Long performing in 2009

In 2009, after garnering popularity on YouTube, at age 21, Long signed with Capitol Records under her birth name. Her debut album was due for an October 20, 2009, release but was delayed for additional recording to occur. The album was preceded by the single "Dollhouse", which was released on August 18, 2009. The single failed to reach the Billboard Hot 100 but did reach number eleven on the Heatseekers singles chart, No. 31 on the Hot Dance Club Songs becoming a mild chart success.

Jukebox, was released on December 1, 2009. The record sold a mere 1,200 copies in its first week and failed to reach the Billboard 200. However, it did reach number twenty-three on the Billboard Heatseekers album chart, staying on the chart for one week. Despite its commercial failure, the album was critically acclaimed. Billboard highlighted her "knack for combining prose and poetry with catchy beats". The second and final single, "Lovesick", was released on March 2, 2010, but failed to chart completely.

=== 2010–2018: Songwriting for other artists and Coloured ===
Long began writing songs for other recording artists. In 2010, she co-wrote the UK number-one single "Promise This" by Cheryl; as well as "California King Bed", a track from Rihanna's fifth studio album, Loud, released in November 2010. During late 2011, she took part in the ASCAP retreat, a songwriting event in France sponsored by Cain Foundation, Avid, Gibson and Sennheiser. She continued her songwriting career, landing credits on 2011 and 2012 albums by Rihanna, Demi Lovato, Madonna, Mika, Selena Gomez & The Scene, Chris Brown and Little Mix.

In 2013, Long was featured on B.o.B's song "John Doe" from his album Underground Luxury. In 2014, she also contributed to Fifth Harmony's debut album Reflection, by co-writing the song "Worth It", being the album's third single; the song reached number 12 on the Billboard Hot 100. Long co-wrote Carrie Underwood and Miranda Lambert's 2014 hit duet, "Somethin' Bad", which was nominated for a Grammy Award, and reached number one on Billboard's Country Chart. The song was later chosen by NBC Sports to replace "I Hate Myself for Loving You" by Joan Jett as the opening theme for its National Football League. Like Jett's song, "Somethin' Bad" was reworked to fit the broadcast's narrative as "Oh, Sunday Night" and was performed by Carrie Underwood, who recorded the original with Miranda Lambert.

Long appeared as the vocalist on the 2015 single "Be Right There" by Diplo and Sleepy Tom. The track was given 'the hottest record in the world' title on the Annie Mac BBC Radio 1 Friday night show. The lyrics in "Be Right There" were taken from the 1992 single "Don't Walk Away" by Jade. In 2016, Long collaborated with Pusha T and Meek Mill on "Black Moses". The song served as part of The Birth of a Nation soundtrack album.

In 2017, Long featured on Train's song "Loverman", from their album A Girl, a Bottle, a Boat. On April 6, 2018, Long released "Gentle Hands" and "Heavenly", the first two singles from her then-forthcoming album, Coloured. Music videos for both singles premiered online via Paper Magazine. The album was released on June 22, 2018, marking nine years since Long's debut. Her decision to title the album Coloured was called provocative by some, due to the racial stigma of the term "colored" in American history. In interviews, she explains that by spelling it with a "u", the word "our" appears in the middle as her statement of inclusivity. NPR noted that as an African-American country album, Coloured is a "consciously confrontational statement". Rolling Stone showcased "Family Tree" within the album as a song of "empowerment". The song "Land of the Free", according to NPR, serves as "an appeal for empathy toward those who live in fear of racial profiling and police brutality". Ashley Gorley co-wrote several tracks. In 2018 she co-wrote "A No No" with Mariah Carey, featured in her fifteenth studio album Caution.

=== 2019–present: Breakthrough and Public Displays of Affection ===
Renea began performing under the name "Muni Long" (pronounced "money long") in 2019. She debuted the name with her 2020 single "Midnight Snack" featuring Jacob Latimore, which was released alongside an accompanying music video in October of that year. That same year, she was also credited for co-writing Ariana Grande's "Just like Magic" and "Six Thirty" from the album Positions. Explaining that Renea is the "protector of Priscilla", Long released her single titled "Build a Bae" featuring Yung Bleu in December 2020, her fourth single release since October. She previously released her debut extended play (EP) Black Like This, which celebrates Blackness, on November 13 under her co-founded label imprint, Supergiant Records. This was followed by a seven-track EP Nobody Knows in July 2021. In November 2021, she released an eight-track EP titled Public Displays of Affection. Regarding the title, Long explained: "I really went in the studio writing the music and it was times I caught myself crying. I'm not the most touchy-feely person. So, for me, putting all my feelings on this project is sort of like my 'public display of affection'". Describing the EP as "intimate", Vibe ranked it as the 19th best R&B album of 2021. Long also released a music video for the EP track "Hrs and Hrs", a song on which she "details what she can do for hours upon hours with her partner". In January 2022, the track "Time Machine" started going viral on TikTok.

In March 2022, Long signed with the record label Def Jam Recordings. According to Vogue, Muni Long reflects Renea's "new strong, fabulous persona through fashion" as well as music, creating a new "fashion identity" with the help of celebrity stylist Jason Rembert. Discussing the notion of being a Black role model, she stated: "how you're introduced to someone is the way they will remember you, unless you are reintroduced", following up with: "I'm in the reintroduction process."

On July 1, 2022, Long released the EP Public Displays of Affection Too, which was promoted by the singles "Pain", "Another", and "Baby Boo", the latter of which being a collaboration with rapper Saweetie.

On September 14, 2022, Long announced that her third studio album (and debut under her current moniker) Public Displays of Affection: The Album would be released on September 23, 2022. The eighteen-track collection will feature every song from her prior two EPs (aside from "Just Beginning"), as well as six new tracks.

On March 17, 2025, Long performed a rendition of "We Belong Together" at the iHeartRadio Music Awards 2025. This was a tribute performance to Mariah Carey who would be receiving the Icon Award. In a comment to an iHeartRadio Instagram post, Long confirmed that Carey personally "chose [her] to honor her" at the awards ceremony. On June 24, 2025, it was announced that Long would appear as a support act for Brandy and Monica's 2025 The Boy Is Mine Tour, alongside Kelly Rowland and Jamal Roberts; the tour is due to commence in October 2025, and finish in December 2025.

== Personal life ==
She has been diagnosed with lupus. Long is autistic. She contracted pneumonia while supporting The Boy Is Mine Tour with Brandy and Monica, forcing her to withdraw from the tour's final show dates. The illness required her to undergo a double lung transplant.

She has cited litigation, battles with former management, plus the "whirlwind of being dropped, re-signed then dropped again from a label" as creative catalysts for her work. She runs her own music label, Supergiant Records, named in reference to "the biggest star in the galaxy"

Her song "Family Tree" was inspired by the time she was "kicked out of her family's home as a teenager". She attended Vero Beach High School. Long has one son, which was revealed when she brought him on stage during the 11:11 Tour with Chris Brown.

== Discography ==
Priscilla Renea/Muni Long discography
- Studio albums: 4
- Extended plays: 5
- Singles: 24

=== Studio albums ===
Title	Details	Peak chart positions
Title	Details	US Heat
Jukebox	Released: December 1, 2009; Label: Capitol; Formats: CD, digital download, streaming	23
Coloured	Released: June 22, 2018; Label: White Rose Garden, Thirty Tigers; Formats: CD, LP, digital download, streaming	—
Public Displays of Affection: The Album	Released: September 23, 2022; Label: Supergiant, Def Jam; Formats: CD, LP, digital download, streaming	5
Revenge	Released: August 30, 2024; Label: Muni Long Inc, Def Jam; Formats: CD, LP, digital download, streaming	8
"—" denotes releases that did not chart or were not released in that territory.

=== EPs ===
Title	Details	Peak chart positions		
Title	Details	US	US Heat.	US R&B
Hello My Apple	Released: 2009; Label: Capitol; Formats: CD, digital download, streaming	—	—	—
Black Like This	Released: November 13, 2020; Label: Supergiant, Create; Formats: Digital download, streaming	—	—	—
Nobody Knows	Released: July 14, 2021; Label: Supergiant, Def Jam; Formats: Digital download, streaming	—	—	—
Public Displays of Affection	Released: November 19, 2021; Label: Supergiant, Def Jam; Formats: CD, LP, digital download, streaming	170	2	21
Public Displays of Affection Too	Released: July 1, 2022; Label: Supergiant, Def Jam; Formats: Digital download, streaming	—	8	—
"—" denotes releases that did not chart or were not released in that territory.

=== Singles ===
==== As lead artist ====
Title	Year	Peak chart positions										Certifications	Album
Title	Year	US	US R&B/ HH	US R&B	CAN	NLD	NZ	UK	UK R&B	UK Indie	WW	Certifications	Album
"Dollhouse"	2009	— (Note: "Dollhouse" did not enter the Billboard Hot 100 but peaked at number ten on the Bubbling Under Hot 100 extension chart.)	—	—	—	—	—	—	—	—	—		Jukebox
"Lovesick"	2009	—	—	—	—	—	—	—	—	—	—		Jukebox
"Gentle Hands"	2018	—	—	—	—	—	—	—	—	—	—		Coloured
"Heavenly"	2018	—	—	—	—	—	—	—	—	—	—		Coloured
"Family Tree"	2018	—	—	—	—	—	—	—	—	—	—		Coloured
"Midnight Snack" (with Jacob Latimore)	2020	—	—	—	—	—	—	—	—	—	—		Black Like This
"Breakin Up"	2020	—	—	—	—	—	—	—	—	—	—		Black Like This
"Nekkid" (with YFN Lucci)	2020	—	—	—	—	—	—	—	—	—	—		Black Like This
"Build a Bae" (featuring Yung Bleu)	2020	—	—	—	—	—	—	—	—	—	—		Nobody Knows
"Thot Thoughts" (featuring Sukihana)	2021	—	—	—	—	—	—	—	—	—	—		Nobody Knows
"Bodies"	2021	—	—	—	—	—	—	—	—	—	—		Nobody Knows
"Sneaky Link"	2021	—	—	—	—	—	—	—	—	—	—		Nobody Knows
"No R&B" (with Ann Marie)	2021	—	—	—	—	—	—	—	—	—	—		Public Displays of Affection and Public Displays of Affection: The Album
"Ain't Easy"	2021	—	—	—	—	—	—	—	—	—	—		Public Displays of Affection and Public Displays of Affection: The Album
"Hrs and Hrs" (solo or remix featuring August Alsina or Usher)	2022	16	4	1	69	91	15	41	18	3	33	RIAA: 3× Platinum; BPI: Silver; RMNZ: 2× Platinum	Public Displays of Affection and Public Displays of Affection: The Album
"Time Machine"	2022	—	—	16	—	—	—	—	—	—	—		Public Displays of Affection and Public Displays of Affection: The Album
"Another"	2022	—	— (Note: "Another" did not enter the Billboard Hot R&B/Hip-Hop Songs chart but peaked at number 16 on the R&B/Hip-Hop Airplay chart.)	12	—	—	—	—	—	—	—		Public Displays of Affection Too and Public Displays of Affection: The Album
"Pain"	2022	—	—	19	—	—	—	—	—	—	—		Public Displays of Affection Too and Public Displays of Affection: The Album
"Baby Boo" (with Saweetie)	2022	—	— (Note: "Baby Boo" did not enter the Billboard Hot R&B/Hip-Hop Songs chart but peaked at number 27 on the R&B/Hip-Hop Airplay chart.)	22	—	—	— (Note: "Baby Boo" did not enter the NZ Top 40 Singles Chart, but peaked at number 28 on the NZ Hot Singles Chart.)	—	—	—	—		Public Displays of Affection Too and Public Displays of Affection: The Album
"Made for Me" (solo or remix with Mariah Carey)	2023	20	8	2	62	— (Note: "Made for Me" did not enter the Dutch Single Top 100, but peaked at number 24 on the Dutch Single Tip chart.)	14	36	14	—	45	RIAA: Platinum; BPI: Silver; RMNZ: Platinum	Revenge
"Make Me Forget"	2024	—	— (Note: "Make Me Forget" did not enter the Billboard Hot R&B/Hip-Hop Songs chart but peaked at number 18 on the R&B/Hip-Hop Airplay chart.)	16	—	—	—	—	—	—	—		Revenge
"Ruined Me"	2024	—	— (Note: "Ruined Me" did not enter the Billboard Hot R&B/Hip-Hop Songs chart but peaked at number 12 on the R&B/Hip-Hop Airplay chart.)	10	—	—	— (Note: "Ruined Me" did not enter the NZ Top 40 Singles Chart, but peaked at number five on the NZ Hot Singles Chart.)	—	—	—	—	RMNZ: Gold	Revenge
"Superpowers"	2025	—	— (Note: "Superpowers" did not enter the Billboard Hot R&B/Hip-Hop Songs chart but peaked at number 13 on the R&B/Hip-Hop Airplay chart., number 1 on the Adult R&B Airplay chart, and number 21 on the Top R&B Songs chart.)	—	—	—	—	—	—	—	—		Revenge
"Delulu"	2025	—	—	—	—	—	—	—	—	—	—		TBA
"Ain't U Tired" (with Jessie Reyez)	2026	—	—	—	—	—	—	—	—	—	—		A Little Vengeance
"—" denotes releases that did not chart or were not released in that territory.

==== As featured artist ====
Title	Year	Peak chart positions					Album
Title	Year	US	US R&B/ HH	US Rap	BEL (FL) Tip	NLD	Album
"John Doe" (B.o.B featuring Priscilla)	2013	69	18	10	6	32	Underground Luxury
"Sex (Remix)" (MadeInParis featuring Muni Long)	2022	—	—	—	—	—	Non-album single
"Chainzzz" (Kaliii featuring Muni Long)	2022	—	—	—	—	—	Toxic Chocolate
"Honey" (John Legend featuring Muni Long)	2022	—	— (Note: "Honey" did not enter the Hot R&B/Hip-Hop Songs chart but peaked at number 22 on the R&B/Hip-Hop Airplay chart.)	—	—	—	Legend
"The Recipe" (Babyface featuring Muni Long)	2022	—	—	—	—	—	Girls Night Out
"Mine" (Tink featuring Muni Long)	2022	—	—	—	—	—	Pillow Talk
"Obvious" (Craig David featuring Muni Long)	2022	—	—	—	—	—	22 (Deluxe)
"Day N Night" (Afrojack & Black V Neck featuring Muni Long)	2022	—	—	—	—	—	Non-album singles
"Obsession" (Eric Bellinger featuring Muni Long)	2022	—	—	—	—	—	Non-album singles
"IYKYK" (Alex Vaughn featuring Muni Long)	2022	—	—	—	—	—	The Hurtbook (Homegirl Pack)
"Angel Pt. 1" (Kodak Black and NLE Choppa featuring Jimin, Jvke and Muni Long)	2023	65	18	11	—	—	Fast X: Original Motion Picture Soundtrack
"Angel Pt. 2" (Jvke featuring Jimin, Charlie Puth and Muni Long)	2023	—	—	—	—	—	Non-album single
"My Body // Your Body" (Snakehips featuring Muni Long)	2023	—	—	—	—	—	Never Worry (Deluxe)
"Emotions" (City Girls featuring Muni Long)	2023	—	—	—	—	—	RAW
"The Moves" (Neiked featuring Nile Rodgers and Muni Long)	2024	—	—	—	—	—	Non-album singles
"Midnight Sun" (Zara Larsson featuring Muni Long)	2025	—	—	—	—	—	Non-album singles
"—" denotes releases that did not chart or were not released in that territory.

==== Promotional singles ====
Title	Year	Album
"Kiss Me"	2017	Non-album singles
"Luv Kanye"	2021	Non-album singles
"Bald Head Bitch" (featuring Monaleo)	2021	Non-album singles
"Plain Jane" (with Femme It Forward)	2021	Non-album singles
"Just Beginning – Live"	2021	Non-album singles
"Santa Baby"	2022	Non-album singles
"Still Work" (with OG Parker and Ty Dolla Sign)	2023	Non-album singles
"Made for Me – Live"	2024	Non-album singles

=== Other charted songs ===
List of other charted songs, with selected chart positions, showing year released and originating album
Title	Year	Peak chart positions	Album
Title	Year	US Bub.	Album
"Don't Deserve" (with GloRilla)	2024	24	Glorious

=== Other guest appearances ===
List of non-single and album guest appearances, with other performing artists, showing year released and album name
Title	Year	Other artist(s)	Album
"Black & White"	2025	Teddy Swims	I've Tried Everything but Therapy (Part 2)

=== Writing credits ===
All writing credits adapted from Spotify unless otherwise noted.

Year	Artist	Album	Song
2008	Girlicious	Girlicious	"Here I Am"
2009	Cheryl	3 Words	"Happy Hour"
2010	Cheryl	Messy Little Raindrops	"Promise This"
2010	Cheryl	Messy Little Raindrops	"Hummingbird"
2010	Cheryl	Messy Little Raindrops	"Raindrops"
2010	Cheryl	Messy Little Raindrops	"The Flood"
2010	Rihanna	Loud	"California King Bed"
2011	Chris Brown	F.A.M.E.	"Beg for It"
2011	Selena Gomez & The Scene	When the Sun Goes Down	"Who Says"
2011	Selena Gomez & The Scene	When the Sun Goes Down	"Bang Bang Bang"
2011	Kelly Rowland	Here I Am	"Work It Man"
2011	Kelly Rowland	Here I Am	"Turn It Up"
2011	Greyson Chance	Hold On 'til the Night	"Stranded"
2011	Demi Lovato	Unbroken	"Fix a Heart"
2011	Demi Lovato	Unbroken	"Yes I Am"
2011	Cher Lloyd	Sticks and Stones	"Superhero"
2011	Rihanna	Talk That Talk	"Watch n' Learn"
2011	Mary J. Blige	My Life II... The Journey Continues (Act 1)	"Don't Mind"
2011	Six D	Non-album single	"Best Damn Night"
2012	Madonna	MDNA	"Gang Bang"
2012	Madonna	MDNA	"Love Spent"
2012	Chris Brown	Fortune	"Don't Wake Me Up"
2012	Mika	The Origin of Love	"Popular Song"
2012	Bridgit Mendler	Hello My Name Is...	"All I See Is Gold"
2012	Bridgit Mendler	Hello My Name Is...	"5:15"
2012	Girls' Generation	Girls' Generation II: Girls & Peace	"I'm A Diamond"
2012	Little Mix	DNA	"Turn Your Face"
2012	Sabi	All I Want	"Where They Do That At?"
2013	Demi Lovato	Demi	"In Case"
2013	K. Michelle	Rebellious Soul	"V.S.O.P."
2013	Tamar Braxton	Love and War	"Tip Toe"
2013	The Saturdays	Living For the Weekend	"Gentleman"
2013	The Saturdays	Living For the Weekend	"Lease My Love"
2013	Pitbull	Meltdown	"Timber"
2013	Chrisette Michele	Better	"Snow"
2014	Miranda Lambert	Platinum	"Somethin' Bad"
2014	FEMM	Femm-Isation	"Whiplash"
2014	Mary J. Blige	Think Like a Man Too	"Wonderful"
2015	Fifth Harmony	Reflection	"Worth It"
2015	Fifth Harmony	Reflection	"Going Nowhere"
2015	Mariah Carey	#1 to Infinity	"Infinity"
2015	Monica	Code Red	"I Miss Music"
2015	Currensy	Canal Street Confidential	"Bottom of the Bottle"
2015	Charlie Puth	Nine Track Mind	"River"
2016	K. Michelle	More Issues Than Vogue	"Time"
2016	K. Michelle	More Issues Than Vogue	"Rich"
2016	K. Michelle	More Issues Than Vogue	"All I Got"
2016	K. Michelle	More Issues Than Vogue	"Memphis"
2016	Fifth Harmony	7/27	"Write on Me"
2016	Fifth Harmony	7/27	"Squeeze"
2016	Nick Jonas	Last Year Was Complicated	"Touch"
2016	Nick Jonas	Last Year Was Complicated	"Bacon"
2016	Sabrina Carpenter	Evolution	"Thumbs"
2016	Meek Mill, Pusha T	The Birth of a Nation: The Inspired By Album	"Black Moses"
2016	Fantasia	The Definition Of...	"When I Met You"
2017	Brooke Candy, Sia	Daddy Issues	"Living Out Loud"
2017	Kelly Clarkson	Meaning of Life	"Love So Soft"
2017	ZZ Ward	The Storm	"Help Me Mama"
2017	Train	A Girl, a Bottle, a Boat	"Drink Up"
2017	Train	A Girl, a Bottle, a Boat	"Crazy Queen"
2017	K. Michelle	Kimberly: The People I Used to Know	"Brain on Love"
2017	Tamar Braxton	Bluebird of Happiness	"Heart in My Hands"
2017	Mary J. Blige	Strength of a Woman	"It's Me"
2018	Mariah Carey	Caution	"A No No"
2018	David Guetta	Non-album single	"She Knows How to Love Me"
2019	Ariana Grande	Thank U, Next	"Fake Smile"
2019	Ariana Grande	Thank U, Next	"Imagine"
2019	Claudia Leitte	Non-album single	"Bandera"
2020	Ariana Grande	Positions	"Just like Magic"
2020	Ariana Grande	Positions	"Six Thirty"
2021	Florida Georgia Line	Life Rolls On	"New Truck"

== Awards and nominations ==
Year	Association	Category	Nominated work	Result	Ref
2022	American Music Awards	Favorite R&B Song	"Hrs and Hrs"	Nominated	
2022	American Music Awards	Favorite Female R&B Artist	Herself	Nominated	
2022	BET Awards	Best New Artist	Herself	Nominated	
2022	Give Her FlowHERS Awards	The Bloom Award	Herself	Won	
2022	Grammy Awards	Album of the Year	Back of My Mind (as songwriter)	Nominated	
2022	MTV Europe Music Awards	Best Push	"Baby Boo"	Nominated	
2022	MTV Video Music Awards	Push Performance of the Year	"Baby Boo"	Nominated	
2022	People's Choice Awards	The New Artist of 2022	Herself	Nominated	
2022	Soul Train Music Awards	Song of the Year	"Hrs and Hrs"	Nominated	
2022	Soul Train Music Awards	The Ashford & Simpson Songwriter's Award	"Hrs and Hrs"	Won	
2022	Soul Train Music Awards	Video of the Year	"Hrs and Hrs"	Nominated	
2022	Soul Train Music Awards	Best New Artist	Herself	Nominated	
2023	Grammy Awards	Best New Artist	Herself	Nominated	
2023	Grammy Awards	Best R&B Performance	"Hrs and Hrs"	Won	
2023	Grammy Awards	Best R&B Song	"Hrs and Hrs"	Nominated	
2023	iHeartRadio Music Awards	R&B Song of the Year	"Hrs and Hrs"	Nominated	
2023	iHeartRadio Music Awards	R&B Artist of the Year	Herself	Nominated	
2023	iHeartRadio Music Awards	Best New R&B Artist	Herself	Won	
2024	MTV Video Music Awards	Best R&B	"Made for Me"	Nominated	
2025	Grammy Awards	Best R&B Performance	"Made for Me"	Won	
2025	Grammy Awards	Best Traditional R&B Performance	"Make Me Forget"	Nominated	
2025	Grammy Awards	Best R&B Song	"Ruined Me"	Nominated	
2025	Grammy Awards	Best R&B Album	Revenge	Nominated	
2025	iHeartRadio Music Awards	R&B Artist of the Year	Herself	Nominated	
2025	iHeartRadio Music Awards	R&B Song of the Year	"Made for Me"	Won	

== Filmography ==
Release date	Song	Album	Director	Director of Photography	Views
11.22.2021	HRS & HRS	Public Displays of Affection	Damien Sandoval	Joshua Libertine	154,000,000+
07.13.2022	Baby Boo ft Saweetie	Public Displays of Affection Too	Jaquel Knight	Doug Porter	1,400,000+
11.29.2021	IMU	Public Displays of Affection			484,500+
11.18.2021	Time Machine	Public Displays of Affection	Damien Sandoval	Joshua Libertine	18,750,000+
04.11.2022	Another	Public Displays of Affection (Deluxe)	Jon Primo	Andrey Nikolaev	5,800,000+
05.12.2022	Pain	Public Displays of Affection Too	Muni Long		4,100,000+
