= Jukebox (Priscilla Renea album) =

Studio album by Priscilla Renea
- Released: December 1, 2009
- Recorded: 2008–2009
- Genre: Pop; rock; R&B
- Length: 36:26
- Label: Capitol
- Producer: Brian Kidd; Soulshock & Karlin; Benny Blanco; Lil' Ronnie

Priscilla Renea chronology
Jukebox (2009)	Coloured (2018)

Singles from Jukebox
- 1. "Dollhouse" Released: August 18, 2009; 2. "Lovesick" Released: March 2, 2010

Jukebox is the debut studio album by American pop singer-songwriter Priscilla Renea, today known as Muni Long. It was released on December 1, 2009. The album received positive reviews and spawned two singles: "Dollhouse", which garnered mild success, and "Lovesick".

== Background ==
Six out of the eleven songs on the album were solely written by Renea. Renea wrote many songs like stories, by beginning with the verses and working on a chorus later, to make the songs more soulful and heartfelt. Renea performed many of the guitar and piano pieces of the songs herself. The album was originally due for an October 20, 2009, release but it was delayed by over a month for additional recording to occur for the album.

== Critical reception ==
The album received generally positive reviews from critics. Ivan Mitchell of Prefixmag called the album "abstract", stating: "lead single 'Dollhouse' is the kind of sassy, exuberant pop/rock/R&B hybrid that Rihanna would have probably done earlier in her career". He went on to say that "'Fixing My Hair' finds common ground with the flashy torch soul productions of the 1980s".

Latifah Muhammad of ConcreteLoop stated that the album is "a delightful hybrid of poetic expression garnished with life lessons". She opined that "the theme of Jukebox revolves around the old saying 'you can catch more flies with honey than with vinegar' in that it manages to get a point across in a softer tone rather than boisterous and overbearing. Even though nothing really manages to ride above a steady boil, that's not always a bad thing. Jukebox is a pretty smooth ride null of any huge potholes or blunders, which is admirable and worth a good listen".

The album was also reviewed favorably in Billboard.

== Promotion ==
Renea promoted the album by releasing an EP before the album. Hello My Apple was released on March 31, 2009, for digital download. However, Renea never performed live to promote the album, and only promoted the album with singles. However, Renea did release videos via YouTube to give her fans a sneak peek of the album's songs before its release.

=== Singles ===
- "Dollhouse" was released as the lead single from the album on August 18, 2009. The single reached number eleven on the Heatseekers singles chart, number thirty-one on the Hot Dance Club Songs chart and number thirty-four on the Pop Songs, becoming a mild chart success. A video was released in September 2009.
- "Lovesick" was released as the second and final single from the album on March 2, 2010. The single was promoted with videos of Renea singing the song with fans.

== Track listing ==
Jukebox — Standard edition
No.	Title	Length
1.	"Dollhouse"	3:32
2.	"Lovesick"	3:23
3.	"Pretty Girl"	3:07
4.	"Baby Please"	4:27
5.	"Rockabye Baby"	3:38
6.	"Bacon 'n Eggs"	3:03
7.	"Mr. Workabee (Intro)"	0:40
8.	"Mr. Workabee"	3:10
9.	"Stonegarden"	3:22
10.	"City Love"	3:41
11.	"Fixing My Hair"	4:23

Jukebox — iTunes edition (bonus tracks)
No.	Title	Length
12.	"Dollhouse (acoustic version)""	3:56
13.	"Arizona"	3:43

== Charts ==
Weekly chart performance for Jukebox
Chart (2009)	Peak position
US Heatseekers Albums (Billboard)	23
