= Dollhouse (Priscilla Renea song) =

Single by Priscilla Renea

from the album Jukebox
- Released: August 17, 2009
- Recorded: 2009
- Genre: Electropop; synthpop; neo-electro
- Length: 3:32
- Label: Capitol
- Songwriters: Priscilla Hamilton; Benny Blanco; Lil' Ronnie
- Producers: Benny Blanco; Lil' Ronnie

Priscilla Renea singles chronology
"Dollhouse" (2009)	"Lovesick" (2010)

"Dollhouse" is the debut single by American pop singer-songwriter Priscilla Renea, released in late 2009 in North America. Produced by Benny Blanco and Lil' Ronnie, the song is from her 2009 debut album, Jukebox. It is an uptempo dance song with influences of neo-electro and synthpop. The main idea behind the song is relationship independence and was written as an uptempo empowerment anthem that declares independence from an insensitive, indifferent partner.

== Music and lyrics ==
"Dollhouse" is an uptempo electropop song with strong uses of synthesizers, keyboards, and heavily synthesized drum machine. Influences derive from electronic music, synthpop, and neo-electro with an ethereal sound very similar to Lily Allen's 2008 hit single "The Fear". Set in common time, the song has a hook, is moderately fast, and composed in the key of F major and has a metronome of 136 beats per minute. Renea's voice spans from D flat to B flat.

The song's lyrics, written by Renea, Benny Blanco, and Lil' Ronnie, have been interpreted as an empowerment anthem about relationship independence. The song's protagonist sings in first person perspective while condemning her insensitive partner for many faults including lack of interest and straying away from their love.

== Music video ==
The music video was released to Renea's YouTube channel on August 17, 2009, the same day the song was released for digital download.

The video depicts Renea and her partner shrunk down to size and living in a dollhouse. Renea in the video is depicted as a picture-perfect girl wearing bright red and green dresses who is unhappy with her lover. Within the video she expresses her anger and resentment at him up to a point where she cannot stand it anymore and breaks free of his clutches, growing back to normal size and having him sent away. There are many scenes of Renea singing on a life-sized chair while still the size of a doll, in parts of the dollhouse she lives in, and one scene where she is life-sized again, putting her now ex-boyfriend in a box to be sent away, which ends the video.

== Track listing ==
Remixes EP (iTunes only)

1. "Dollhouse" (Jason Nevins Radio Edit) - 3:56
2. "Dollhouse" (Mr. Mig Mainstream Radio Edit) - 4:02
3. "Dollhouse" (Bimbo Jones Radio Edit) - 3:29

== Sales ==
Sales for the single stand at 39,000+.

== Charts ==
Chart (2009–10)	Peak position
US Bubbling Under Hot 100 (Billboard)	10
U.S. Billboard Pop Songs	34
U.S. Billboard Heatseekers Songs	11
U.S. Billboard Hot Dance Club Songs	31

== Release history ==
Release dates and formats for "Dollhouse"
Region	Date	Format	Label(s)	Ref.
United States	August 18, 2009	Mainstream airplay	Capitol	
