= Coloured (album) =

- Standard edition cover artwork

Studio album by Priscilla Renea
- Released: June 22, 2018
- Recorded: 2015–2017
- Studios: Boots Ottestad home studio; Compound Studios; Speakeasy Sound; Sony Tree Studios (live band); Windmark Recording
- Genres: Americana; country soul; R&B
- Length: 36:49
- Label: Thirty Tigers
- Producers: Priscilla Renea; Per Kristian "Boots" Ottestad; Honorable C.N.O.T.E.; Curtis "Sauce" Wilson; Theron Feemster; Supa Dups; Jesse "Corparal" Wilson; Raysean Hairston

Priscilla Renea chronology
| Jukebox (2009) | Coloured (2018) | Public Displays of Affection: The Album (2022) |

Singles from Coloured
- 1. "Gentle Hands" Released: April 6, 2018; 2. "Heavenly" Released: April 6, 2018; 3. "Family Tree" Released: May 10, 2018

Coloured is the second studio album by American singer and songwriter Priscilla Renea, released on June 22, 2018 through Thirty Tigers. The first two singles, "Gentle Hands" and "Heavenly", were released on April 6, 2018 with accompanying music videos. "Family Tree" was released on May 10, 2018 as the third official single from Coloured.

== Background and recording ==
After nearly a decade focused on songwriting, Coloured marked Priscilla Renea's return to the public as an artist. Since releasing her debut album (Jukebox) in 2009, Renea had become an award-winning songwriter, with credits on "Timber" for Pitbull and Kesha, "Somethin' Bad" for Miranda Lambert, "California King Bed" for Rihanna, "Worth It" for Fifth Harmony, and "Don't Mind" for Mary J. Blige.

Renea's decision to title the album Coloured was called provocative by some, due to the racial stigma of the term "colored" in American history. In interviews, she explains that by spelling it with a "u", the word "our" appears in the middle as her statement of inclusivity.

As early as 2015, Renea spoke in interviews about her working on her forthcoming album. Renea continued songwriting, but no official music was released until "Kiss Me" in February 2017 and "Do Wut" in January 2018.

Coloured was written and recorded between Nashville and Los Angeles in 2016.

== Composition and themes ==
Renea spent several months writing and recording the core records of Coloured at songwriter and "Heavenly" co-writer Brett James' converted barn recording studio. The 10-song collection brings together hip-hop producers (Honorable C.N.O.T.E, Curtis "Sauce" Wilson, Theron Feemster, Brett James) with Nashville songwriters (Ashley Gorley, Kevin Kadish). Coloured is a mix of classic R&B, dark-edged Country and Urban Soul songs that were inspired by incidents in Priscilla's childhood in rural Florida, relationships, and racial trauma. Guitar, piano, and violin can be heard throughout the record.

== Release and promotion ==
On April 2, 2018, Renea revealed on Instagram that her second studio album would be released in Summer 2018. The following week Paper Magazine premiered two music videos for singles on her forthcoming album. Renea promoted the album with a special show at the Country Music Hall of Fame and Museum.

=== Singles ===
On April 6, 2018, Renea released "Gentle Hands" and "Heavenly", the first two singles from Coloured. Music videos for both singles premiered online via Paper Magazine. The third single from Coloured was released on May 10, 2018. "Family Tree" is an autobiographical track written by Renea about her distressed teenage years, and overcoming challenges within her family.

== Track listing ==
| No. | Title | Lyrics | Producer(s) | Length |
|---|---|---|---|---|
| 1. | "Family Tree" | Priscilla Renea; Per Kristian "Boots" Ottestad; Ben Burgess; Erick Walls | Per Kristian "Boots" Ottestad | 3:55 |
| 2. | "Jonjo" | Priscilla Renea; Per Kristian "Boots" Ottestad; Lindsey Bachelder; Carlton Mays | Per Kristian "Boots" Ottestad; Honorable C.N.O.T.E. | 2:40 |
| 3. | "Gentle Hands" | Priscilla Renea; Curtis "Sauce" Wilson; Kevin Kadish; Emily Shackelton; Carlton Mays | Curtis "Sauce" Wilson; Honorable C.N.O.T.E. | 3:20 |
| 4. | "Heavenly" | Priscilla Renea; Brett James; James T. Slater; Theron Feemster | Theron Feemster | 3:22 |
| 5. | "You Shaped Box" | Priscilla Renea; Marti Frederiksen; Danny Myrick; Erick Walls | Priscilla Renea | 2:48 |
| 6. | "If I Ever Loved You" | Priscilla Renea; Ashley Gorley | Priscilla Renea | 4:42 |
| 7. | "Different Color" | Priscilla Renea; Frank Romano; Dwayne Chin-Quee; Raysean Hairston | Supa Dups | 3:04 |
| 8. | "Denim" | Priscilla Renea; Jesse Wilson; Curtis "Sauce" Wilson; Raysean Hairston | Jesse "Corparal" Wilson for The Art of Winning, LLC); Curtis "Sauce" Wilson | 3:24 |
| 9. | "Let's Build a House" | Priscilla Renea; Ashley Gorley; Theron Feemster | Priscilla Renea; Theron Feemster | 4:17 |
| 10. | "Land of the Free" | Priscilla Renea; Raysean Hairston; Donovan Bennett; Joel Augustin; Theron Feemster; Erick Walls | Raysean Hairston; Theron Feemster | 5:07 |
| Total length: | | | | 36:49 |

== Personnel ==
Performance credits

- Priscilla Renea – vocals
- Erick Walls – bass, guitar
- Bianca McClure – violin
- Theron Feemster – piano
- Matt Bubel – drums
- Mark Prentice – bass
- Russ Pahl – acoustic guitar, steel guitar
- Adam Shoenfeld – electric guitar
- Jeffery Roach – piano
- Frank Romano – steel guitar

Technical credits

- Boots Ottestad – engineer
- Sauce – engineer
- Brandon Wood – engineer
- Kyle Mann – engineer
- Priscilla Renea – engineer
