= Skating with the Stars =

- Genre: Reality competition
- Directed by: Alex Rudzinski
- Presented by: Tanith Belbin; Vernon Kay
- Judges: Dick Button; Johnny Weir; Laurieann Gibson
- Country of origin: United States
- Original language: English
- No. of seasons: 1
- No. of episodes: 6

Production
- Executive producers: Izzie Pick; Paul Osborne; Phil Edgar Jones
- Camera setup: Multiple
- Running time: 120 minutes
- Production company: BBC Worldwide Productions

Original release
- Network: ABC
- Release: November 22 – December 21, 2010

Related
- Dancing with the Stars

Skating with the Stars is an American reality competition series that aired on ABC from November 22 to December 21, 2010. A spin-off of Dancing with the Stars hosted by British television personality Vernon Kay, it featured celebrities paired with professionals from the world of figure skating.

The show had a schedule similar to the first season of Dancing with the Stars with performance shows on Monday nights. On week 2, the pair with the lowest combined judges points and viewer votes was eliminated at the end of the show. All six episodes of the show were broadcast. Johnny Weir, Dick Button, and Laurieann Gibson served as judges, while Tanith Belbin served as color commentator.

== Couples ==
The 6 celebrities and professional ice skaters were:

Celebrity	Known for	Professional Partner	Status
Sean Young	Actress	Denis Petukhov	Eliminated 1st on November 29, 2010
Vince Neil	Mötley Crüe singer	Jennifer Wester	Eliminated 2nd on December 6, 2010
Brandon Mychal Smith	Disney Channel actor	Keauna McLaughlin	Withdrew on December 13, 2010
Jonny Moseley	Olympic freestyle skier	Brooke Castile	Third place on December 20, 2010
Bethenny Frankel	Reality television star & author	Ethan Burgess	Runners-up on December 21, 2010
Rebecca Budig	Actress	Fred Palascak	Winners on December 21, 2010

== Scoring chart ==
Couple	Pl.	1	2	1+2	3	4	5	
Couple	Pl.	1	2	1+2	3	4	Top 3	Top 2
Rebecca & Fred	1st	45	44	89	50	53	9+57=66	+60=126
Bethenny & Ethan	2nd	29	33	62	36	38	7+43=50	+51=101
Jonny & Brooke	3rd	40	44	84	51	54	8+52=60	
Brandon & Keauna	4th	36	49	85	39			
Vince & Jennifer	5th	28	30	58	36			
Sean & Denis	6th	34	30	64				

Red numbers indicate the lowest score for each week.
Green numbers indicate the highest score for each week.
indicates the couple eliminated that week.
indicates the returning couple that was in the bottom two.
indicates that a couple withdrew from the competition.
indicates the winning couple.
indicates the runner-up couple.
indicates the third-place couple.

== Weekly scores ==
Unless indicated otherwise, individual judges scores in the chart below (given in parentheses) are listed in this order from left to right: Laurieann Gibson, Johnny Weir, Dick Button.

=== Week 1 ===
Running order

Couple	Technical Merit	Artistic Impression	Music
Brandon & Keauna	16 (6,5,5)	20 (7,7,6)	"American Boy"—Estelle feat. Kanye West
Sean & Denis	16 (6,5,5)	18 (7,5,6)	"Bubbly"—Colbie Caillat
Jonny & Brooke	21 (7,7,7)	19 (6,6,7)	"Higher Ground"—Stevie Wonder
Rebecca & Fred	21 (7,7,7)	24 (8,8,8)	"Closer"—Ne-Yo
Vince & Jennifer	14 (6,4,4)	14 (6,4,4)	"I Like the Way You Move"—BodyRockers
Bethenny & Ethan	15 (5,5,5)	14 (5,4,5)	"Right Round"—Flo Rida featuring Ke$ha

=== Week 2 ===
Running order

Couple	Style	Technical Merit	Artistic Impression	Music
Jonny & Brooke	Swing	24 (8,8,8)	20 (7,6,7)	"Jump, Jive, and Wail!"—The Brian Setzer Orchestra
Vince & Jennifer	Tango	13 (6,3,4)	17 (6,6,5)	"El Tango de Roxanne"—The Police
Bethenny & Ethan	Swing	17 (6,5,6)	16 (6,5,5)	"The Boy Does Nothing"—Alesha Dixon
Brandon & Keauna	Tango	24 (8,8,8)	25 (9,8,8)	"Shut Up"—The Black Eyed Peas
Sean & Denis	Swing	12 (5,3,4)	18 (5,7,6)	"Boogie Woogie Bugle Boy"—The Andrews Sisters
Rebecca & Fred	Tango	23 (8,7,8)	21 (8,6,7)	"Whatever Lola Wants"—Gwen Verdon

=== Week 3 ===
Running order

Couple	Technical Merit	Artistic Impression	Music
Rebecca & Fred	25 (9,8,8)	25 (9,8,8)	"Hot n Cold"—Katy Perry
Bethenny & Ethan	17 (6,6,5)	19 (7,6,6)	"Halo"—Beyoncé Knowles
Vince & Jennifer	16 (6,5,5)	20 (7,6,7)	"You're Beautiful"—James Blunt
Jonny & Brooke	24 (8,9,7)	27 (9,9,9)	"Cosmic Love"—Florence + The Machine
Brandon & Keauna*	18 (8,5,5)	21 (9,6,6)	"Keep Holding On"—Avril Lavigne

*Brandon was unable to perform his routine due to breathing problems, so his scores were based on a taped recording of him and Keauna's dress rehearsal footage.

=== Week 4 ===
Running order

Couple	Technical Merit	Artistic Impression	Music
Bethenny & Ethan	18 (6,6,6)	20 (7,6,7)	"Superstition"—Stevie Wonder
Jonny & Brooke	27 (9,9,9)	27 (9,9,9)	"Take On Me"—A-ha
Rebecca & Fred	26 (9,8,9)	27 (9,9,9)	"December 1963 (Oh, What A Night)"—Frankie Valli & The Four Seasons

*Brandon and Keauna withdrew before the live performances, which caused them not to be able to perform live.

=== Week 5 ===
Running order (Night 1)

Couple	Group Skate Score	Technical Merit	Artistic Impression	Music
Rebecca & Fred; Bethenny & Ethan; Jonny & Brooke	9; 7; 8			"All I Want for Christmas Is You"—Mariah Carey
Rebecca & Fred		28 (9,10,9)	29 (10,9,10)	"Fix You"—Coldplay
Bethenny & Ethan		21 (7,7,7)	22 (8,7,7)	"Haven't Met You Yet"—Michael Bublé
Jonny & Brooke		26 (9,9,8)	26 (9,8,9)	"Let's Get It On"—Marvin Gaye

Running order (Night 2)

Couple	Technical Merit	Artistic Impression	Music
Bethenny & Ethan	23 (8,7,8)	28 (10,9,9)	"Right Round"—Flo Rida featuring Ke$ha
Rebecca & Fred	30 (10,10,10)	30 (10,10,10)	"Hot n Cold"—Katy Perry

== Required element schedule ==
Each week, the celebrities and professional partners need to perform specific "Required Elements" in their routines.

- Week 1: The One Foot Assisted Glide & The Pair Spin
- Week 2: Tango or Swing, Tricky Footwork and Lifts
- Week 3: Jumps and Love Story
- Week 4: Thrill Week: The Death Spiral, The Throw, The Overhead Lift
- Week 5 Night One : Group Skate & Freeskate
- Week 5 Night Two : Favorite Skate of the Season

== Ratings ==
Episode Number	Episode	Original airdate	Rating	Share	Rating/Share (18–49)	Viewers (millions)	Rank (Timeslot)	Rank (Night)	Weekly Rank
1.01	Week 1	November 22, 2010	6.1	10	2.4/6	10.96	2	8	No.24
1.02	Week 2	November 29, 2010	4.1	6	1.2/3	6.06	4	12	No. 54
1.03	Week 3	December 6, 2010	2.6	4	0.8/2	3.94	5	10	
1.04	Week 4	December 13, 2010	2.6	4	0.8/2	3.79	4	11	
1.05	Week 5	December 20, 2010	3.1	5	0.5/2	3.37	4	10	
1.06	Finale Results	December 21, 2010			0.8/3	3.41	4	9	

== See also ==
- Skating with Celebrities, a similar series aired by Fox in 2006, adapted from ITV's Dancing on Ice format.
