= Bravetown =

- Theatrical release poster
- Directed by: Daniel Duran
- Written by: Oscar Orlando Torres
- Produced by: Daniel Duran; Oscar Orlando Torres; Phyllis Laing; Danny Rodriguez
- Starring: Lucas Till; Josh Duhamel; Kherington Payne
- Cinematography: Angel Barroeta
- Edited by: Matt Evans; Adam Gerstel
- Music by: Angelo Milli
- Production company: 2 Wolves Films
- Distributed by: Entertainment One
- Release date: May 8, 2015 (United States)
- Running time: 114 minutes
- Country: United States
- Language: English

Bravetown is a 2015 American independent musical drama film written by Oscar Orlando Torres, and was directed by Daniel Duran in his directorial debut. The film stars Lucas Till, Josh Duhamel and Kherington Payne. The film was released in a limited release and through video on demand on May 8, 2015, by Entertainment One.

== Plot ==
Josh is a musically talented DJ who, after an accidental overdose, goes to live with his estranged father in North Dakota. His journey to make amends with his family, past friends, and hometown opens him up to emotional encounters that reveal more than he was expecting.

== Cast ==
- Lucas Till as Joshua N. "Josh" Harvest
- Kherington Payne as Mary Johnson
- Josh Duhamel as Dr. Alexander Weller
- Jae Head as Tony
- Sharlene Taulé as Angie
- Tom Everett Scott as Jim
- Maria Bello as Martha
- Laura Dern as Annie

== Production ==
The film was originally titled Strings during its production.

Principal photography on the film commenced on June 9, 2013, in Winnipeg, then Selkirk, Manitoba.

== Release ==
The film was released in a limited release and through video on demand on May 8, 2015, by Entertainment One.

== Reception ==
On the review aggregator website Rotten Tomatoes, 29% of 14 critics' reviews are positive. Metacritic, which uses a weighted average, assigned the film a score of 36 out of 100, based on 10 critics, indicating "generally unfavorable" reviews.
