= P. Diddy's Starmaker =

- Cast
- Created by: Sean Combs
- Presented by: Kimberly Caldwell
- Judges: P. Diddy; Rodney Jerkins; Tamara Conniff; Laurie Ann Gibson
- Country of origin: United States
- No. of seasons: 1
- No. of episodes: 0

Production
- Executive producers: P. Diddy; Mark Burnett

Original release
- Network: MTV
- Release: August 23, 2009

P. Diddy's Starmaker is an American reality television singing competition show that aired for one season on MTV in 2009. Kimberly Caldwell was the host, with P. Diddy, Rodney Jerkins, Tamara Conniff, and Laurie Ann Gibson as the judges.

== Performances ==
=== Week 1 ===
- Todd Sarvies – "I Write Sins Not Tragedies" by Panic! at the Disco
- Lauriana Mae – "Mercy" by Duffy
- David Bennett – "I Don't Want to Be" by Gavin DeGraw
- Angel Inez – "Love" by Keyshia Cole
- Jordan Battiste – "Forever" by Chris Brown
- Marissa Shipp – "Bleeding Love" by Leona Lewis
- Christopher John – "Your Body Is a Wonderland" by John Mayer
- Zach Berkman – "Clocks" by Coldplay
- Lauren Thomas – "Don't Cha" by The Pussycat Dolls
- David Joseph – "Viva la Vida" by Coldplay
- Monet Monico – "Complicated" by Avril Lavigne
- Melody Angel – "So What" by Pink
- Omotayo Riley – "Buy U a Drank (Shawty Snappin')" by T-Pain
- Liz Davis – "Gunpowder & Lead" by Miranda Lambert

=== Week 2 ===
- Monet Monico – "Hot n Cold" by Katy Perry
- Angel Inez – "Spotlight" by Jennifer Hudson
- Marissa Shipp – "7 Things" by Miley Cyrus
- Melody Angel – "Because of You" by Kelly Clarkson
- Liz Davis – "Material Girl" by Madonna
- Lauriana Mae – "Better in Time" by Leona Lewis

=== Week 4 ===
- Angel Inez – "Crazy In Love" by Beyoncé
- Monet Monico – "No One" by Alicia Keys
- Lauriana Mae – "Rehab" by Amy Winehouse
- Melody Angel – "Since You Been Gone" by Kelly Clarkson
- Liz Davis – "Last Name" by Carrie Underwood

=== Week 5 ===
- Christopher John – "Magic" by Robin Thicke
- Omotayo Riley – "American Woman" by Lenny Kravitz
- Todd Sarvies – "Move Along" by All American Rejects
- Jordan Battiste – "I'm Yours" by Jason Mraz
- David Bennett – "Never" by David Bennett (original)

=== Week 6 ===
- Monet Monico – "U + Ur Hand" by Pink
- Todd Sarvies – "Yellow" by Coldplay
- Lauriana Mae – "Unwritten" by Natasha Bedingfield
- Christopher John – "Higher Ground" by Stevie Wonder
- Liz Davis – "Big Girls Don't Cry" by Fergie
- Omotayo Riley – "Irreplaceable" by Beyoncé
- Melody Angel – "Lucky" by Melody Angel (original)
- David Bennett – "Instant Karma" by John Lennon

=== Week 7 ===
- Liz Davis – "Girlfriend" by Avril Lavigne
- Omotayo Riley – "Every Breath You Take" by The Police
- Monet Monico – "Just Dance" by Lady Gaga
- David Bennet – "Call Me" by Blondie
- Melody Angel – "It's Not Over" by Daughtry
- Todd Sarvies – "Thnks Fr Th Mmrs" by Fall Out Boy
- Lauriana Mae – "Love, Traitors and Fate" by Lauriana Mae (original)

=== Week 8 ===
- Liz Davis – "Before He Cheats" by Carrie Underwood
- Monet Monico – "Dirty Little Secret" by All American Rejects
- Melody Angel – "Just Like a Pill" by Pink
- Omotayo Riley – "Moving Mountains" by Usher
- Todd Sarvies – "Flatline" by Todd Sarvies (original)
- Lauriana Mae – "If I Ain't Got You" by Alicia Keys

=== Week 9 ===
- Todd Sarvies – "Ready, Set, Go!" by Tokio Hotel
- Melody Angel – "How to Save a Life" by The Fray
- Lauriana Mae – "Chasing Pavements" by Adele
- Liz Davis – "Here for the Party" by Gretchen Wilson

=== Week 10 ===
- Liz Davis – "Redneck Woman" by Gretchen Wilson
- Melody Angel – "If I Were a Boy" by Beyoncé
- Todd Sarvies – "Fix You" by Coldplay

== Contestants ==
- Liz Davis, Nashville, Tennessee
- Todd Sarvies, St. Louis, Missouri
- Melody Angel, Chicago Heights, Illinois
- Lauriana Mae, Keyport, New Jersey
- Monet Monico, Westlake Village, California
- Omotayo Phaniel Riley, Brooklyn, New York
- David Bennet, Los Angeles, California
- Christopher John, Sacramento, California
- Jordan Battiste, Queens, New York
- Angel Inez, Newark, New Jersey
- Zach Berkman, Peoria, Illinois
- Marissa Shipp, Phoenix, Arizona
- Lauren Thomas, O'Fallon, Missouri
- David Dim, East Haven, Connecticut

== Episode progress ==
Episode progress chart
	1	2	3	4	5	6	7	8	9	Finale
Liz	IN	IN	IN	IN	IN	LOW	IN	IN	IN	WIN
Todd	IN	IN	HIGH	IN	HIGH	IN	IN	IN	LOW	2ND
Melody	HIGH	IN	IN	LOW	IN	HIGH	IN	IN	IN	OUT
Lauriana	IN	LOW	IN	HIGH	IN	HIGH	IN	IN	OUT	
Monet	IN	HIGH	IN	IN	IN	HIGH	LOW	OUT		
Omotayo	IN	IN	IN	IN	LOW	IN	IN	OUT		
David B	HIGH	IN	IN	IN	HIGH	IN	OUT			
Christopher	IN	IN	IN	IN	IN	OUT				
Jordan	IN	IN	LOW	IN	OUT					
Angel	LOW	IN	IN	OUT						
Zach	LOW	IN	OUT							
Marissa	IN	OUT								
Lauren	OUT									
David J	OUT									

The contestant won P. Diddy's Starmaker.
The contestant was one of the top performances of the night.
The contestant did not perform that night.
The contestant was in the bottom two.
The contestant was eliminated.

The contestant is male.
The contestant is female.

== Guests ==
- Guest Photographer Kevin Ou
