= Born to Dance (2015 film) =

- Directed by: Tammy Davis
- Written by: Steve Barr, Hone Kouka, Casey Whelan
- Produced by: Daniel Story; Leanne Saunders
- Starring: Tia Maipi, Stan Walker, Parris Goebel, Kherington Payne, John Tui
- Cinematography: Duncan Cole
- Edited by: Jeff Hurrell
- Production companies: Cinema Management Group Llc; Park Road Post Ltd.
- Distributed by: Vendetta Films
- Release dates: 11 September 2015 (TIFF); 24 September 2015 (New Zealand); 5 November 2015 (Australia)
- Running time: 96 min
- Country: New Zealand
- Language: English
- Box office: $828,304

Born to Dance is a 2015 New Zealand feature film. It was written by Steve Barr, Hone Kouka and Casey Whelan and marks the feature film directorial debut by Tammy Davis, best known for his role as Munter in Outrageous Fortune. The film premiered on 24 September 2015 in New Zealand. Born to Dance was choreographed by Parris Goebel.

== Plot ==
A coming of age tale told through the eyes of Tu, a young Maori man from South Auckland who dreams of being a professional hip-hop dancer. His father, a military man, dislikes his lack of direction and threatens him with army enlistment in six weeks. Tu conceals his dancing from his father. He dances with a local crew 2PK, but also hides from them his personal ambition to win the national championships.

Tu’s dancing appears in a YouTube video of smooth moves that goes viral, and is noticed by the country’s reigning hip-hop stars, K-Crew. Kane (Jordan Vaha’akolo) the ruthless troupe leader, invites Tu to audition. Tu trains with K-Crew along with other hopefuls over several nights, and ultimately none of them are selected - instead, Kane steals Tu's best moves. It is revealed that the auditions were a sham, designed to bring K-Crew new dance material, which they rip off and use every year. Tu befriend's Kane’s girlfriend, American dancer Sasha (Kherington Payne), but Kane's jealousy halts their relationship. Her affluent North Shore lifestyle clashes with his own.

Tu admits to his father his love of dance, and received his blessing. He returns to 2PK and trains relentlessly for the national championships along with the K-Crew rejects. The film's finale is the dance-off for places in the finals, and Tu cleverly forms a new crew called Freaks, literally during the competition itself, by pretending that 2PK members are from different crews - they battle and suddenly synchronise. Freaks battle K-Crew in the final and win the competition. Tu and Sasha kiss.

== Cast ==
- Tia Maipi as Tu
- Kherington Payne as Sasha
- John Tui as Zack
- Kelvin Taylor as African American Dance Crew Leader
- Parris Goebel
- Stan Walker as Benjy
- Alexandra Carson as Sophie
- Jordan Vaha'akolo as Kane
- Onyeka Arapai
- Kaea Pearce
- Kirsten Dodgen

== Production ==
In October 2014, it was announced that production on the film commenced in Auckland. It was also announced that film newcomer Tia Maipi would play the lead role of Tu alongside Kherington Payne (who had starred in So You Think You Can Dance and Katy Perry’s California Dreams Tour) and Australian Idol winner Stan Walker. Parris Goebel served as choreographer on the film.

== Release ==
The official trailer was released on 21 July 2015. The poster was released on 28 July 2015. The film was released in New Zealand on 24 September 2015 and in Australia on 5 November 2015.

== Soundtrack ==
The official soundtrack for the film was released on 18 September 2015 through Sony Music Records. New Zealand DJ and producer P-Money curated the tracks synonymous with New Zealand culture. Included on the album are songs from David Dallas, Sid Diamond, Scribe and lead single “Start Again” by Stan Walker and Samantha Jade. On 2 October, the soundtrack reached number 38 on the New Zealand Albums Chart.

== Reception ==
The film opened to mixed reviews. Graeme Tuckett of Stuff.co.nz rated Born to Dance four out of five stars and praised the dancing ability of the actors, especially considering the lack of "wires, stunt doubles or even much camera trickery". The New Zealand Herald's Francesca Rudkin and 3 News' Kate Rodger praised P-Money's work on the soundtrack.

The film's "cringe-worthy" dialogue was criticised by Alice Harbourne from Metro.
