= Lovesick (Priscilla Renea song) =

Single by Priscilla Renea

from the album Jukebox
- Released: March 2, 2010
- Recorded: 2009
- Genre: Pop; soul; jazz pop
- Length: 3:23
- Label: Capitol
- Songwriter: Priscilla Renea
- Producers: Benny Blanco, Lil' Ronnie

Priscilla Renea singles chronology
"Dollhouse" (2009)	"Lovesick" (2010)	"John Doe" (2013)

"Lovesick" is a jazz pop song by American pop singer–songwriter Priscilla Renea, released as the second and final single from her debut album, Jukebox on March 2, 2010. The song is a jazz-influenced song with traces of R&B and pop and is lyrically about forbidden love.

== Music and lyrics ==
The song's lyrics, written solely by Renea, have been interpreted as light-hearted and about forbidden love. Renea has stated that the song was inspired by the music she heard growing up in Vero Beach, Florida.

== Music video ==
A music video for the song was originally planned to be released in February 2010, but its release was canceled because the album received low sales. Renea released videos of her fans singing the song with her as a version of a music video instead.
