= Casey Zilbert =

New Zealand screenwriter and film director

Cathasaigh Ó Fiannachta, formerly known as Casey Zilbert or Casey Whelan, is a New Zealand screenwriter, producer, and film director of Irish origin.

== Biography ==
Zilbert was born in Wellington and spent their childhood in a variety of locations including Egypt and Nigeria. They attended the United World College of South East Asia in Singapore, completing the International Baccalaureate programme, before returning to New Zealand. They completed a degree in film and English at the University of Auckland, and then worked in the script department of the television soap opera Shortland Street for three years.

They co-wrote the movie Born to Dance (2015), and wrote and directed the comedy Hang Time (2019).

=== Awards and recognition ===
- Fulcrum Media Finance Woman to Watch Award at the 2018 Women in Film and Television New Zealand Awards
