= Laurieann Gibson =

Canadian choreographer (born 1969)

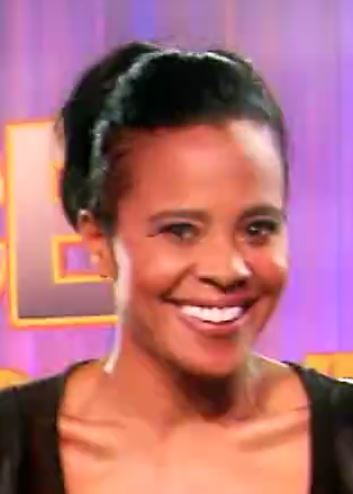
- Gibson in 2014
- Born: July 14, 1969 (age 57); Toronto, Ontario, Canada
- Occupations: Choreographer; television personality; director; singer; actress; dancer
- Years active: 1987–present
- Musical career
- Genres: Hip hop; urban
- Instrument: Vocals

Laurieann Gibson (born July 14, 1969) is a Canadian choreographer, director, television personality, singer, actress, and dancer. She has choreographed dance numbers for musical artists such as Michael Jackson, Alicia Keys, Lady Gaga, and Beyoncé. Her music video directing credits include "Judas", "You and I", and "Love to My Cobain".

In 2005, Gibson rose to prominence on the MTV reality series Making the Band, and later worked as a judge on Little Talent Show, Skating with the Stars, and So You Think You Can Dance. Gibson also had a brief musical career, in which she released two albums.

== Life and career ==
Gibson was born in Toronto, Ontario, Canada on July 14, 1969. She rose to public prominence as the star of MTV's Making the Band and P. Diddy and Mark Burnett's Starmaker series. Gibson was also a "Fly Girl" on the popular TV series In Living Color.

Following her training at the Alvin Ailey American Dance Theater, Gibson went from theatre dance to hip hop, becoming director of choreography for Motown Records and Bad Boy Records. She has worked with Michael Jackson, Alicia Keys, and Beyoncé. She has also done choreography for the movies Alfie and Honey, in which she also appeared as Jessica Alba's dance rival.

In November 2011, Lady Gaga ended her professional relationship with Gibson due to "creative differences".

In 2012, Gibson directed BIGBANG's World Tour.

Gibson was the choreographer for Gugu Mbatha-Raw in Beyond the Lights, training her for 6 months in order to perfect her pop-star persona.

In 2017, Gibson was featured on Lifetime's Dance Moms as a guest choreographer for Abby Lee Miller's Elite Competition Team.

In 2019, Gibson became a judge on the sixteenth season of So You Think You Can Dance alongside, Nigel Lythgoe, Mary Murphy, and fellow newcomer Dominic "D-Trix" Sandoval.

In 2020, Gibson was awarded the inaugural Willie Dunn Award by the Prism Prize committee, to honour her work as a choreographer and director of music videos.

== Personal life ==
Gibson is the godmother of American model and dancer Alton Mason, whose career she helped launched by securing him a position as a backup dancer for P. Diddy at the BET Awards 2015.

== Choreography ==
- 1996: Michael Jackson - "They Don't Care About Us" (Brazil version)
- 1997: Missy Elliott – "The Rain (Supa Dupa Fly)"
- 2000: Lil' Kim – "No Matter What They Say"
- 2003: Dream – "Crazy"
- 2004: Brandy – "Afrodisiac"
- 2004: Brandy – "Talk About Our Love"
- 2004: JoJo – "Leave (Get Out)"
- 2005: JoJo – "Not That Kinda Girl"
- 2006: Danity Kane – "Show Stopper"
- 2006: Danity Kane – "Ride for You"
- 2007: LAX Gurlz – "Forget You"
- 2008: Lady Gaga – "Beautiful, Dirty, Rich"
- 2008: Lady Gaga – "Poker Face"
- 2009: Cassie – "Must Be Love"
- 2009: Lady Gaga – "LoveGame"
- 2009: Lady Gaga – "Paparazzi"
- 2009: Lady Gaga – "Bad Romance"
- 2009: Sun Ho – "Fancy Free"
- 2010: Katy Perry – "California Gurls"
- 2010: Lady Gaga – "Telephone"
- 2010: Lady Gaga – "Alejandro"
- 2010: Keri Hilson – "The Way You Love Me"
- 2010: Natalia Kills – "Mirrors"
- 2010: Nicki Minaj – "Check It Out" 2010 VMA Pre-Show
- 2011: Lady Gaga – "Born This Way"
- 2011: Lady Gaga – "Judas"
- 2011: Natalia Kills – "Wonderland"
- 2011: JoJo – "The Other Chick"
- 2011: Lady Gaga – "The Edge of Glory" – live performances
- 2011: Six D – "Best Damn Night"
- 2011: Lady Gaga – "Yoü and I"
- 2012: Nicki Minaj – "Roman Holiday" – 54th Grammy Awards performance
- 2012: Cassie – "King of Hearts"
- 2012: Big Bang – "Big Bang Alive Galaxy Tour 2012"
- 2013: AGNEZ MO – "Coke Bottle" featuring Timbaland and T.I
- 2013: Nicki Minaj – "High School" – 2013 Billboard Music Awards performance
- 2001–2017: Britney Spears
- 2016: Britney Spears – Medley Billboard Music Awards
- 2017: Dance Moms
- 2018: Britney Spears – Britney Spears: Piece of Me Tour

== Filmography ==
=== Television ===
- 1993–1994: In Living Color – Fly Girl dancer
- 2005–2009: Making the Band
- 2006: Little Talent Show – judge
- 2009: P. Diddy's Starmaker
- 2010: Skating with the Stars – judge
- 2011: The Dance Scene
- 2011: Born to Dance
- 2013: Mary Mary
- 2017: Dance Moms
- 2018: Laurieann Gibson: Beyond the Spotlight – Herself
- 2019: So You Think You Can Dance – judge
- 2024: Dress My Tour – judge

=== Film ===
- 2003: Honey – choreographer, cameo appearance as Katrina
- 2011: Lady Gaga Presents the Monster Ball Tour: At Madison Square Garden – director, choreographer, cameo appearance
- 2011: Honey 2 – cameo appearance

=== Video ===
- 2010: Keri Hilson – "The Way You Love Me"
- 2011: Lady Gaga – "Judas" – codirector
- 2011: Lady Gaga – "You and I" – codirector
- 2013: Jeffree Star – "Love to My Cobain" – codirector

== Awards and nominations ==
Gibson has been nominated for 1 Primetime Emmy, 3 MTV Video Music Awards (winning 1), and 1 Teen Choice Award

Award	Year	Category	Result	Ref.
Primetime Emmy Awards	2011	Outstanding Directing for a Variety, Music or Comedy Special Lady Gaga Presents: The Monster Ball Tour at Madison Square Garden (2011)	Nominated	
MTV Video Music Awards (VMA)	2010	Best Choreography Lady Gaga: Bad Romance (2009)	Won	
MTV Video Music Awards (VMA)	2010	Best Choreography Lady Gaga Feat. Beyoncé: Telephone (2010)	Nominated	
MTV Video Music Awards (VMA)	2011	Best Choreography Lady Gaga: Judas (2011)	Nominated	
Teen Choice Awards	2011	Choice TV: Female Reality/Variety Star The Dance Scene (2011)	Nominated	

== Discography ==
- Addictive (2006)
- Last Chance (2012)
