= Jane Campbell Hutchison =

American art historian (1932–2020)

Jane Campbell Hutchison (July 20, 1932 – July 12, 2020) was an American art historian specialising in the old master prints of the Northern Renaissance. She was best known for her 1990 biography of Albrecht Dürer, which was translated into German and Japanese.

She was born in Washington, D.C. and grew-up in the suburb of District Heights, Maryland. After studying art history at Oberlin College, Hutchison in 1964 obtained a doctorate from the University of Wisconsin–Madison with a dissertation on the Master of the Housebook supervised by James Watrous. She taught at the University of Wisconsin for almost 50 years, from 1964 to 2012. She died, aged 87, in Chevy Chase, Maryland.

== Publications ==
- The Master of the Housebook (1972)
- Early German Artists: Martin Schongauer, Ludwig Schongauer, and Copyists (The Illustrated Bartsch, vol. 8, part 1)
- Early German Artists: Wenzel von Olmütz, Mair von Landshut and Monogrammists (The Illustrated Bartsch, vol. 9, part 2)
- Albrecht Dürer: A Biography (Princeton University Press, 1990)
- Albrecht Dürer: A Guide to Research (New York, Garland, 2000)
