= Made for Me =

2023 single by Muni Long

Single by Muni Long

from the album Revenge
- Released: September 15, 2023
- Genre: R&B
- Length: 3:08
- Label: Supergiant; MPR; Def Jam
- Songwriters: Priscilla Hamilton; Jermaine Mauldin; Bryan-Michael Cox; Jordan Orvosh
- Producers: Jermaine Dupri; Bryan-Michael Cox; JordanXL

Muni Long singles chronology
| "Angel Pt. 2" (2023) | "Made for Me" (2023) | "Make Me Forget" (2024) |

Alternative cover
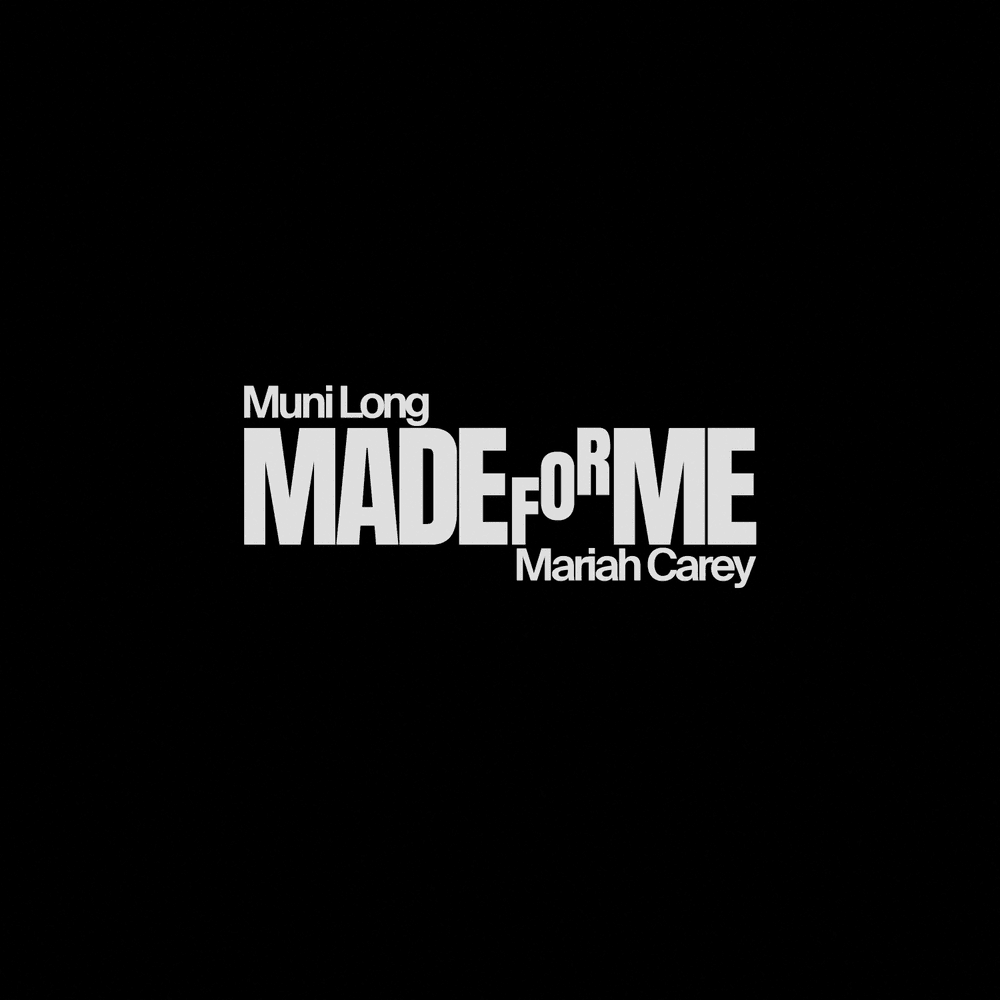
- Mariah Carey remix

Mariah Carey singles chronology
| "Portrait" (2024) | "Made for Me" (Remix) (2024) | "Don't Forget About Us" (Kaytranada remix) (2025) |

Music video
- "Made for Me" on YouTube

"Made for Me" is a song by American singer Muni Long, released on September 15, 2023, as the lead single from her fourth studio album, Revenge (2024). It was co-written with producers Jermaine Dupri, Bryan-Michael Cox, and JordanXL. A number of remixes of "Made for Me" have been released, including ones with Lil Jon and Kronic, Bnyx, and Mariah Carey, among others.

"Made for Me (Live on BET)" won a Grammy Award for Best R&B Performance. The song has also received a nomination for the Viewer's Choice Award at the 2024 BET Awards.

== Composition and lyrics ==
The song is an R&B ballad with piano, drum machine and bass. Lyrically, Muni Long expresses her love for her son: "Nobody knows me like you do / Nobody gon' love me quite like you / Can't even deny it / Every time I try it / One look in my eyes, you know I'm lying".

== Critical reception ==
The song received generally positive reviews. Music critics have described it as "nostalgic" and "sweet". Tallie Spencer of HotNewHipHop described the song as "infectious and guaranteed to have you put it on repeat for hours and hours at a time" and called it "an example of a track that speaks to her talents as a singer and songwriter." Butta of Soul Bounce wrote of the song, "The songwriting, sound and singing are all top-notch and the musical equivalent of a chef's kiss."

== Music video ==
An official music video premiered on January 17, 2024. Directed by Des Gray and Trinidad James, it sees Muni Long as a scientist building a replica of an ideal man, who is played by singer Luke James. Long has explained, "I wanted to have fun with this video and really think outside of the box. It's my little nod to A.I. mixed with Frankenstein. If you want to find the perfect person in a limited dating pool, you might just have to create them! It's only science fiction for now but with how fast technology is changing could this be our reality someday?"

== Accolades ==
Awards and nominations for "Made For Me"
| Organization | Year | Category | Result | Ref. |
|---|---|---|---|---|
| MTV Video Music Awards | 2024 | Best R&B | Nominated | |
| BET Awards | 2024 | Viewer's Choice | Nominated | |
| Billboard Music Awards | 2024 | Top R&B Song | Nominated | |
| Grammy Awards | 2025 | Best R&B Performance | Won | |
| iHeartRadio Music Awards | 2025 | R&B Song of the Year | Won | |
| ASCAP Pop Music Awards | 2025 | Winning Songwriters and Publishers | Won | |

== TikTok virality ==
In January 2024, the song achieved virality on the video-sharing platform TikTok, beginning when a woman named Milck Marie used the song in several videos, in which she would sing the pre-chorus ("Twin, where have you been?") and lip-sync the chorus.

== Charts ==
=== Weekly charts ===
Weekly chart performance for "Made for Me"
| Chart (2024) | Peak position |
|---|---|
| Australia Hip Hop/R&B (ARIA) | 22 |
| Australia New Music Singles (ARIA) | 18 |
| Canada Hot 100 (Billboard) | 62 |
| Global 200 (Billboard) | 45 |
| Netherlands (Single Tip) | 24 |
| New Zealand (Recorded Music NZ) | 14 |
| Nigeria (TurnTable Top 100) | 47 |
| Philippines (Billboard) | 16 |
| South Africa Streaming (TOSAC) | 5 |
| UK Singles (Official Charts) | 36 |
| UK Hip Hop/R&B (Official Charts) | 14 |
| US Billboard Hot 100 | 20 |
| US Hot R&B/Hip-Hop Songs (Billboard) | 8 |
| US Pop Airplay (Billboard) | 24 |
| US Rhythmic Airplay (Billboard) | 2 |

Chart performance for "Made for Me" (with Mariah Carey)
| Chart (2024) | Peak position |
|---|---|
| UK Singles Downloads (Official Charts) | 95 |
| UK Singles Sales (OCC) | 99 |

=== Year-end charts ===
2024 year-end chart performance for "Made For Me"
| Chart (2024) | Position |
|---|---|
| US Billboard Hot 100 | 56 |
| US Hot R&B/Hip-Hop Songs (Billboard) | 20 |
| US Rhythmic (Billboard) | 30 |

== Certifications ==
Certifications for "Made for Me"
| Region | Certification | Certified units/sales |
|---|---|---|
| New Zealand (RMNZ) | Platinum | 30,000^{‡} |
| United Kingdom (BPI) | Silver | 200,000^{‡} |
| United States (RIAA) | Platinum | 1,000,000^{‡} |
^{‡} Sales+streaming figures based on certification alone.
