= Public Displays of Affection: The Album =

Studio album by Muni Long
- Released: September 23, 2022
- Length: 54:29
- Label: Supergiant; MPR; Def Jam
- Producer: Horace Bray; Tommy Brown; Caleb Bryant; Trevon Campbell; Dante Carter; Charlie Coffeen; DJ Money; Earl on the Beat; Jeff "Gitty" Gitelman; Dylan Graham; Jean-Baptiste; Kuk Harrell; Nicholas Humes; Kaspar Jalily; JayUncut; Simon Kempner; G Koop; Mr. Franks; Carter Lang; Lorenzo Nelson, Jr.; Chad Norman; OG Parker; Tommy Parker; Ambrose Pierce; Pop & Oak; Khaled Rohaim; Karl Rubin; Sir Nolan; S. Dot; Matty Spats; Tee Romano; Tiggi; Ralph Tiller; Eugene Tsai

Muni Long chronology
Coloured (2018)	Public Displays of Affection: The Album (2022)	Revenge (2024)

Singles from Coloured
- 1. "No R&B" Released: October 13, 2021; 2. "Ain't Easy" Released: November 5, 2021; 3. "Hrs and Hrs" Released: February 1, 2022; 4. "Time Machine" Released: February 8, 2022; 5. "Another" Released: April 22, 2022; 6. "Pain" Released: May 13, 2022; 7. "Baby Boo" Released: June 10, 2022

Public Displays of Affection: The Album is the third studio album by American singer Muni Long. It was released on September 23, 2022, through Def Jam Recordings, and marked her first studio album under the Muni Long name.

== Critical reception ==
A. D. Amorosi, writing for Variety, called Public Displays of Affection: The Album a "remarkably seasoned and strong debut" as well as a "long, luxurious album." He found that "although Muni Long isn't a belter and does put on the bedroom voice on a couple of tracks, her first full-length album is a blast of vintage ‘90s R&B that isn’t trying to be cute: It’s filled with frank lyrics about of love and sex from an artist who’s been around for more than a minute."

== Commercial performance ==
Public Displays of Affection: The Album debuted and peaked at number five on the US Top Heatseekers chart in the week of October 8, 2022, becoming Long's first top ten entry on the chart.

== Track listing ==
Public Displays of Affection: The Album track listing
No.	Title	Writer(s)	Producer(s)	Length
1.	"Conversation"	Priscilla Renea; Carter Lang; Marcus Semaj; Nolan Lambroza; Justin Lucas	Sir Nolan; Lang	3:08
2.	"Cartier"	Renea; Matty Spats; Shaun Thomas	S. Dot; Spats	3:16
3.	"Crack"	Renea; Joshua Parker; Terrance Williams; Caleb Bryant	OG Parker; Tee Romano; Bryant	2:41
4.	"Lemons"	Renea; Warren Felder; Andrew Wansel; Kuk Harrell	Pop & Oak	4:03
5.	"Ain't Easy"	Renea; Lorenzo Nelson, Jr.; Nicholas Humes; Raysean Hairston	Nelson; Humes	3:03
6.	"To Do List"	Renea; Trevon Campbell; Beau Strawder; LeShawn Rogers; Simon Kempner	Campbell; Kempner	3:26
7.	"Hrs and Hrs"	Renea; Brandon John-Baptiste; Dylan Graham; Hamadi Aaabi; Isaac Wriston; Justin Nathaniel Zim; Harrell	Ralph Tiller; Graham	3:24
8.	"Plot Twist"	Renea; Charlie Coffeen; Horace Bray; Hairston	Coffeen; Bray	2:32
9.	"Plot Twist" (Interlude)	Renea; Coffeen; Bray; Hairston	Coffeen; Bray	1:33
10.	"Time Machine"	Renea; Chad Norman; Dante Carter; Harrell; Zachary Young	DJ Money; Norman; Carter	3:42
11.	"Butterfly Effect"	Renea; Steven Franks; Tommy Brown	Brown; Mr. Franks	2:38
12.	"The Words"	Renea; Jeff "Gitty" Gitelman; Franks; Brown; Charles Anderson	Brown; Mr. Franks; Gitelman	3:52
13.	"Pain"	Renea; Strawder; James Easton Brooks; Kaspar Jalily; Hairston; Harrell	JayUncut; Jalily	2:33
14.	"Another"	Renea; Isaac Earl Bynum; Robert Mandell; Strawder; Jean Baptiste Kouame; Karl Rubin; Louise Chantál; Hairston; Harrell	Jean-Baptiste; Earl on the Beat; Rubin; G Koop	2:32
15.	"No Signal"	Renea; Campbell; Harrell; LeShawn Rogers; Kempner	Campbell; Kempner	2:43
16.	"No R&B" (with Ann Marie)	Renea; Ambrose Pierce; Joann Marie Slater; Harrell	Pierce	3:34
17.	"IMU"	Renea; Alice Aera; Daniel Sturridge; Eugene Tsai; Harrell; Calvin Tarvin; William Repko IV	Tsai; Tiggi	3:08
18.	"Baby Boo" (with Saweetie)	Renea; Khaled Rohaim; Franks; Brown; Anderson; Diamonté Harper; Thomas Lumpkins	Brown; Mr. Franks; Tommy Parker; Rohaim	2:32
Total length:				54:29

== Charts ==
Weekly chart performance for Public Displays of Affection: The Album
Chart (2022)	Peak position
US Heatseekers Albums (Billboard)	5

== Release history ==
Public Displays of Affection: The Album release history
Region	Date	Format	Label	Ref(s)
Various	September 23, 2022	CD; digital download; streaming	Supergiant; MPR; Def Jam	
