= Six D =

British dance group and band (2011–2012)

Six D were a British dance group and band who formed in early 2011 and split up in January 2012. The band was made up of six members, hence the name Six D, short for Six Dimensions. The members were Chantelle Bernard, Pierre Angus, Kieran Edmonds, Kimmy Campbell, Cassie Macmillan and Levon De Silva. They ranged in age from 16 (De Silva) to 24 (Edmonds). The band performed a school tour throughout the UK during 2010 and 2011 until the release of their first single "Best Damn Night" on 24 July 2011. They also toured with JLS and The Saturdays in 2011 and performed at T4 on the Beach 2011.

== History ==
The band had previously done a number of events to publicise themselves this included a mini-school tour, street dancing performances in the streets of places such as Glasgow, Birmingham, London and Cardiff and interacting with fans on Facebook and Twitter. They also appeared on The Dance Scene on E! in two episodes, one recording the video for "Best Damn Night" and they also performed as the opening act for JLS and The Saturdays on their arena tour.

The group's debut single "Best Damn Night" was released on 24 July 2011 and debuted on the UK Singles Chart at number 34.

Before Six-D disbanded, the group released their second single and music video called "2 Seconds" and was released sometime after July in 2011 and failed to reach the UK Singles Chart.

== Split ==
Following the release of their single the band hit a rough patch in their short career, as following the shut down of Jive Records the band were left without a record label, and Edmonds decided to leave the group in late 2011, and the group decided to split in January 2012, despite the group having recorded their debut album, including unreleased tracks "Your Love Found Me", "Earthquake", "Love Control", "Last One Standing", "Out Of Myself" and more.

== Discography ==
=== Singles ===
Single	Year	Peak chart positions	Album
Single	Year	UK	Album
"Best Damn Night"	2011	34	Best Damn Night
"2 Seconds"	2011		Best Damn Night

=== Music videos ===
Year	Title	View At	Original Album
2011	"Best Damn Night"	Youtube	Best Damn Night
2011	"2 Seconds"	Youtube	Best Damn Night
