= Best Damn Night =

Single by Six D
- Released: 22 July 2011
- Genre: Pop
- Length: 3:16
- Label: Sony Music Entertainment
- Songwriters: Antwoine J Collins; Brandon Green; Priscilla Renea

"Best Damn Night" is the debut single by street dance group and British band Six D. It was released on 22 July 2011 as a digital download in the United Kingdom. The song peaked at number 34 on the UK Singles Chart.

== Music video ==
A music video to accompany the release of "Best Damn Night" was uploaded to YouTube on 17 May 2011 at a total length of three minutes and thirty-two seconds.

== Critical reception ==
Lewis Corner of Digital Spy gave the song a positive review stating:

"We're gonna dance 'til we can't no more/ Hands in the air 'til our arms get sore," Pierre promises over a pick 'n' mix of electronic whooshes, squiggly beeps and a toe-tapping clap-beat - the result the Hubba Bubba of bubblegum R&B. Teamed with some impressive street dance shape-throwing and 'tude-fuelled strike-a-pose moments in the accompanying music video, what's a few lost items anyway when you've got such a head-turning introduction under your belt?

== Track listing ==
Digital download
No.	Title	Length
1.	"Best Damn Night"	3:16
2.	"2 Seconds"	2:55

Digital download - Remixes
No.	Title	Length
1.	"Best Damn Night" (Sunship Edit)	3:19
2.	"Best Damn Night" (Nicola Fasano & Steve Forest Full Vocal Remix)	5:41
3.	"Best Damn Night" (StoneBridge High Street Mix)	5:45
4.	"Best Damn Night" (Acoustic SBTV Version)	3:43
5.	"Best Damn Night" (Lyric Version)	3:13

== Charts ==
Chart (2011)	Peak position
UK Singles (OCC)	34

== Release history ==
Region	Date	Format	Label
United Kingdom	July 22, 2011	Digital Download And CD Single	Sony Music Entertainment
