= Born to Dance (TV series) =

- Country of origin: United States

Production
- Production locations: Atlanta (auditions in NYC, Atlanta and Los Angeles)
- Running time: 1 hour

Original release
- Network: BET
- Release: August 2, 2011 – present

Born to Dance is a reality dance competition show for women on BET starring Laurieann Gibson which debuted on August 2, 2011 at 10:00pm. Contestants will compete for a prize of $50,000 which will go to the winner. Auditions for the show were held in New York City, Los Angeles and Atlanta. The series premier averaged 1.2 million viewers. On the final episode broadcast September 20, 2011, LaTonya Swann was announced as the winner.

== Show format ==
The 20 contestants are:

Name	City	State	Episode Eliminated
Alexandra "Lexi" Rae Yeado	Dallas	TX	2nd
Andrea Gilmore	Van Nuys	CA	6th
Christina Elese Webber	Birmingham	AL	3rd
Endya Lauren Riley	Cincinnati	OH	2nd
Hennessy Rubio	Reseda	CA	8th
Jahleeka "Jelly" Shakii Morris	Decatur	GA	7th
Jessica Shull	Canyon Country	CA	7th
Kaleila Jordan	North Hollywood	CA	4th
Keisha Nicole Hughes	Charlotte	NC	5th
Kristen Michelle Massenburg	Atlanta	GA	4th
Kristina "KC" Castellano	Brooklyn	NY	8th
Latasha Renee Bryant	Greensboro	NC	3rd
Latonya Swann	District Heights	MD	Winner
Lydia Sims	Detroit	MI	6th
Neidra Danielle Lemon	Killeen	TX	3rd
Quiana "Ice" Atherly	Laurel	MD	7th
Sarah Mahmoodzaidehkhoei-Mundo	Katy	TX	3rd
Shannon Berry	Canoga Park	CA	2nd
Theresa "TT" Patterson	Jacksonville	FL	3rd
Theresa Stone	Manorville	NY	5th

== See also ==
- Dancing with the Stars
- Live to Dance
- Soul Train
- American Bandstand
- America's Best Dance Crew
- Dance Fever
- So You Think You Can Dance
