= Hrs and Hrs =

2022 single by Muni Long

- August Alsina remix cover

Single by Muni Long

from the EP Public Displays of Affection and the album Public Displays of Affection: The Album
- Released: November 19, 2021
- Recorded: 2021
- Genre: R&B
- Length: 3:24
- Label: Supergiant; MPR; Def Jam
- Songwriters: Priscilla Renea; Brandon John-Baptiste; Dylan Graham; Isaac Wriston; Hamadi Aaabi; Justin Nathaniel Zim; Kuk Harrell
- Producers: Dylan Graham; Ralph Tiller

Muni Long singles chronology
"Ain't Easy" (2021)	"Hrs and Hrs" (2021)	"Time Machine" (2022)

Music video
- "Hrs and Hrs" on YouTube

Usher remix cover

"Hrs and Hrs" (pronounced "hours and hours") is a song by American singer Muni Long from her EP Public Displays of Affection (2021), and later included on her debut studio album Public Displays of Affection: The Album (2022) as the third single. The song gained recognition through TikTok in late 2021, and was sent to rhythmic contemporary radio on February 1, 2022, as the third single from Public Displays of Affection. "Hrs and Hrs" is an R&B song detailing her love for someone.

It became Long's first song to chart on the Billboard Hot 100, peaking at number 16. The song also topped the R&B Songs chart, becoming the first single by an independent female artist to top the chart. The song's success earned her a record deal from Def Jam Recordings in March 2022. "Hrs and Hrs" won the Grammy Award for Best R&B Performance, and received a nomination for Best R&B Song.

== Background ==
Muni Long came up with the song one night when she was washing dishes. To pass time, she searched for beats on YouTube and played them. She came across an R&B beat which she immediately started freestyling to and began writing the song to the beat. According to Long, it took about 20 minutes. The next day, she went to the recording studio with songwriter Kuk Harrell, and recorded the song there. Initially, Long did not plan to include the song on her EP Public Displays of Affection, but it became a last-minute addition to the project.

Shortly after, actress Bre-Z (a friend of Long's) and her fiancé Chris made a video of their relationship, accompanied by the song. Weeks later, in December 2021, Long posted the video on TikTok. It quickly went viral and the "Hrs and Hrs Challenge" was soon launched; the challenge was popular among the LGBT community, who thought the song meant "Hers and Hers". In January 2022, the song entered multiple Billboard charts, and helped Long move to number one on the Billboard Emerging Artists chart.

== Composition ==
"Hrs and Hrs" is an R&B ballad containing "swoon-worthy, bass-thumping production" by Dylan Graham and Ralph Tiller. It finds Muni Long singing about her willingness to do certain things with her loved one for hours.

== Critical reception ==
Elias Leight of Rolling Stone wrote, "There's not much that's dry and bland about Renea's 'Hrs and Hrs', a decadent R&B ballad — shot through with honeyed, high-wire runs, acrobatic ad-libs, and references to three different kinds of showers (champagne, thunder, traditional) — that went viral over the holidays."

== Remix ==
A remix of the song featuring American singer August Alsina was released in 2021. Another remix featuring American singer Usher was released in 2023.

== Commercial performance ==
"Hrs and Hrs" debuted at number 83 on the Billboard Hot 100. In the week ending January 6, the song reached number 34 on the Hot 100, with 11.5 million streams in the United States (up 89%) and 3,500 downloads sold (up 81%).

== Charts ==
=== Weekly charts ===
Weekly chart performance for "Hrs and Hrs"
Chart (2022)	Peak position
Canada (Canadian Hot 100)	69
Global 200 (Billboard)	33
Netherlands (Single Top 100)	91
New Zealand (Recorded Music NZ)	15
South Africa Streaming (TOSAC)	14
UK Singles (OCC)	41
UK Indie (OCC)	3
UK Hip Hop/R&B (OCC)	18
US Billboard Hot 100	16
US Hot R&B/Hip-Hop Songs (Billboard)	4
US Rhythmic Airplay (Billboard)	1

=== Year-end charts ===
2022 year-end chart performance for "Hrs and Hrs"
Chart (2022)	Position
US Billboard Hot 100	57
US Hot R&B/Hip-Hop Songs (Billboard)	16
US Rhythmic (Billboard)	28

== Certifications ==
Certifications for "Hrs and Hrs"
Region	Certification	Certified units/sales
Brazil (Pro-Música Brasil)	Platinum	40,000^{‡}
New Zealand (RMNZ)	2× Platinum	60,000^{‡}
United Kingdom (BPI)	Silver	200,000^{‡}
United States (RIAA)	3× Platinum	3,000,000^{‡}
^{‡} Sales+streaming figures based on certification alone.

== Release history ==
Release history for "Hrs and Hrs"
Region	Date	Format	Label	Ref.
Various	November 19, 2021	Digital download; streaming	Supergiant; MPR	
United States	February 1, 2022	Rhythmic contemporary	Supergiant; MPR	
United States	May 3, 2022	Contemporary hit radio	Supergiant; Def Jam	
