= The Dance Scene =

- Cast of The Dance Scene
- Genre: Reality
- Country of origin: United States
- Original language: English
- No. of seasons: 1
- No. of episodes: 8

Production
- Executive producers: Amber Mazzola; Ryan Seacrest
- Running time: 22 minutes
- Production company: E! Entertainment Television

Original release
- Network: E!
- Release: April 10 – May 30, 2011

The Dance Scene is an American reality television series on E! that follows the lives of Laurieann Gibson and her team of professional dancers and choreographers as they live and work in the highly competitive dance and entertainment industry, preparing for variety of performances around the world. The Dance Scene premiered April 10, 2011 on the E! Network in the United States, and has since been broadcast in countries around the world.

== Cast ==
- Laurieann Gibson
- Kherington Payne
- Sarah Mitchell
- Paula Van Oppen
- Richard Jackson
- Lacee Franks
- Joe "Flip" Wilson
- Paul Kirkland

== Episodes ==
No.	Title	Original release date
1	"I Am Full Out"	April 10, 2011
2	"I'm Gonna Go Brooklyn on That Pixie Stick"	April 17, 2011
3	"We Can Rule the World With Our Feet"	April 24, 2011
4	"Mama Cub to Mama Cub"	May 1, 2011
5	"Nothing Like a Hot Boy From London"	May 8, 2011
6	"You Passed On Gaga?"	May 15, 2011
7	"I've Been Thrown Out of Better Places"	May 22, 2011
8	"Out of the Closet And Into the Light"	May 30, 2011
