= Jon Bellion discography =

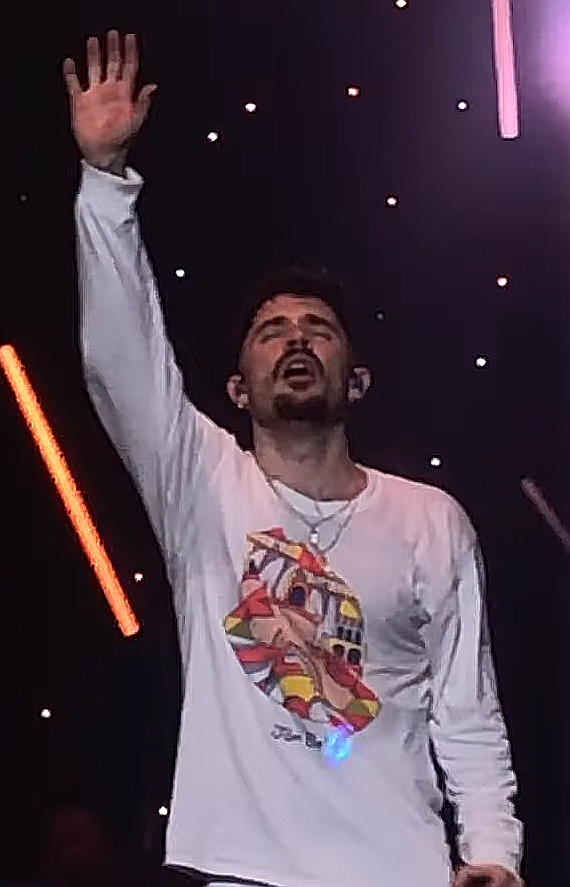
- Bellion performing at the Glory Sound Prep Tour in Raleigh, North Carolina in 2019
- Studio albums: 3
- Singles: 27
- Music videos: 21
- Mixtapes: 4

American singer Jon Bellion has released three studio albums, four mixtapes, and 27 singles (including seven as a featured artist). In addition to his own work, he has also produced and written songs for artists including Maroon 5, Justin Bieber, the Jonas Brothers, Halsey, Camila Cabello, Selena Gomez and Max.

== Albums ==
=== Studio albums ===
Title	Album details	Peak chart positions							Certifications
Title	Album details	US	AUS	CAN	DEN	IRE	NOR	UK	Certifications
The Human Condition	Released: June 10, 2016; Formats: CD, LP, streaming, digital download	5	69	21	32	91	31	169	RIAA: Gold; IFPI DEN: Gold; MC: Gold
Glory Sound Prep	Released: November 9, 2018; Format: CD, LP, cassette, streaming, digital download	15	— (Note: Glory Sound Prep did not chart on the Australian ARIA Albums Chart, but peaked at number 44 on the ARIA Digital Albums Chart.)	—	—	86	—	—	
Father Figure	Released: June 4, 2025; Format: CD, LP, cassette, streaming, digital download	—	—	—	—	—	—	—	
"—" denotes a recording that did not chart or was not released in that territory.

=== Live albums ===
Title	Details
Live from Forest Hills	Released: June 4, 2026; Format: Digital download

=== Mixtapes ===
Title	Mixtape details
Scattered Thoughts Vol. 1	Released: 2011; Format: Digital download
Translations Through Speakers	Released: February 20, 2013; Format: Streaming, digital download, LP
The Separation	Released: December 10, 2013; Format: Streaming, digital download, LP
The Definition	Released: September 23, 2014; Format: Streaming, digital download, LP

== Singles ==
=== As lead artist ===
List of singles, with showing year released, peak chart positions and album name.
Title	Year	Peak chart positions									Certifications	Album
Title	Year	US	AUS	CAN	DEN	GER	NZ	NOR	SWE	UK	Certifications	Album
"Bad for My Health"	2010	—	—	—	—	—	—	—	—	—		Non-album single
"Jim Morrison"	2013	—	—	—	—	—	—	—	—	—		The Separation
"Simple & Sweet"	2014	—	—	—	—	—	—	—	—	—		The Definition
"Luxury"	2014	—	—	—	—	—	—	—	—	—		The Definition
"Munny Right"	2014	—	—	—	—	—	—	—	—	—		The Definition
"Carry Your Throne"	2014	—	—	—	—	—	—	—	—	—		The Definition
"Woodstock (Psychedelic Fiction)"	2015	—	—	—	—	—	—	—	—	—		Non-album single
"Guillotine" (featuring Travis Mendes)	2016	—	—	—	—	—	—	—	—	—		The Human Condition
"80's Films"	2016	—	—	—	—	—	—	—	—	—		The Human Condition
"All Time Low"	2016	16	9	16	28	22	11	24	25	86	RIAA: 4× Platinum; ARIA: 2× Platinum; BPI: Gold; BVMI: Gold; GLF: Gold; IFPI DEN: Platinum; MC: 2× Platinum; RMNZ: 4× Platinum	The Human Condition
"Overwhelming"	2017	—	—	—	—	—	—	—	—	—	RIAA: Gold	The Human Condition
"Conversations with My Wife"	2018	—	—	—	—	—	—	—	—	—		Glory Sound Prep
"JT"	2018	—	—	—	—	—	—	—	—	—		Glory Sound Prep
"Stupid Deep"	2018	—	—	—	—	—	—	—	—	—		Glory Sound Prep
"Good Things Fall Apart" (with Illenium)	2019	— (Note: "Good Things Fall Part" did not enter the Billboard Hot 100, but peaked at number 1 on the Bubbling Under Hot 100 chart.)	—	—	—	—	—	— (Note: "Good Things Fall Apart" did not enter the NZ Top 40 Singles Chart, but peaked at number 38 on the NZ Hot Singles Chart.)	—	—	RIAA: 2× Platinum; RMNZ: Gold	Ascend
"Crop Circles"	2019	—	—	—	—	—	—	—	—	—		Non-album singles
"I Feel It" (featuring Burna Boy)	2021	—	—	—	—	—	—	—	—	—		Non-album singles
"Kid Again"	2024	—	—	—	—	—	— (Note: "Kid Again" did not enter the NZ Top 40 Singles Chart, but peaked at number 30 on the NZ Hot Singles Chart.)	—	—	—		Father Figure
"Wash"	2025	—	—	—	—	—	— (Note: "Wash" did not enter the NZ Top 40 Singles Chart, but peaked at number 38 on the NZ Hot Singles Chart.)	—	—	—		Father Figure
"Horoscope" (featuring Pharrell Williams)	2025	—	—	—	—	—	—	—	—	—		Father Figure
"Why" (featuring Luke Combs)	2025	— (Note: "Why" did not enter the Billboard Hot 100, but peaked at number 6 on the Bubbling Under Hot 100 chart.)	—	70	—	—	— (Note: "Why" did not enter the NZ Top 40 Singles Chart, but peaked at number 3 on the NZ Hot Singles Chart.)	—	—	—		Father Figure
"—" denotes a recording that did not chart or was not released in that territory.

=== As featured artist ===
Title	Year	Peak chart positions			Certifications	Album
Title	Year	US	CAN	FRA	Certifications	Album
"24 Freestyle" (Logic featuring C Dot Castro, Sylvan LaCue, and Jon Bellion)	2014	—	—	—		Non-album single
"Beautiful Now" (Zedd featuring Jon Bellion)	2015	64	61	190	RIAA: Platinum; ARIA: Platinum	True Colors
"Game Plan" (Ojivolta featuring Jon Bellion)	2015	—	—	—		Non-album single
"Dead Presidents" (Travis Mendes featuring Jon Bellion)	2016	—	—	—		Closure
"Obsession" (Vice featuring Jon Bellion)	2017	—	—	—		Non-album single
"False Alarms" (Lawrence featuring Jon Bellion)	2021	—	—	—		Hotel TV
"Drink Water" (Jon Batiste featuring Jon Bellion and Fireboy DML)	2023	—	—	—		World Music Radio
"Meant to Live (Jon Bellion Version)" (Switchfoot featuring Jon Bellion)	2023	—	—	—		The Beautiful Letdown (Our Version)
"Young Gun" (Tori Kelly featuring Jon Bellion)	2023	—	—	—		Tori
"—" denotes a recording that did not chart or was not released in that territory.

== Other charted songs ==
List of other charted songs, with selected chart positions, showing year released and album name
Title	Year	Peak chart positions	Album
Title	Year	US Christ	Album
"Holidaze" (with Lecrae)	2025	31	Reconstruction

== Guest appearances ==
List of non-single guest appearances, with other performing artists, showing year released and album name
Title	Year	Other artist(s)	Album
"Welcome to Forever"	2013	Logic	Young Sinatra: Welcome to Forever
"Jon Bellion's One Way to San Diego (Outro)"	2014	Sylvan LaCue	Searching Sylvan
"Violence"	2015	B.o.B.	Psycadelik Thoughtz
"Rat Race"	2015	Andy Mineo	Uncomfortable
"The Blueprint"	2015	Shy Grey	Don't Over Think
"Passion Fashion"	2019	Judah and the Lion	Pep Talks
"Good Things Fall Apart"	2019	Illenium	Ascend
"Walls"	2023	Jonas Brothers	The Album

== Music videos ==
- "Claps and Autotunes for Lovers"
- "Without Your Face"
- "Come Back Down"
- "Shadows"
- "Bad For My Health"
- "New York Soul"
- "Jim Morrison"
- "LIFE"
- "The Wonder Years"
- "Paper Planes"
- "One More Time"
- "Ungrateful Eyes"
- "Dead Man Walking"
- "Simple and Sweet"
- "Luxury"
- "Carry Your Throne"
- "Guillotine"
- "All Time Low"
- "Stupid Deep"
- "Good Things Fall Apart"
- "Meant to Live"
- "WASH"
- "Father Figure"
- "Why"
- "Two Car Garage"

== Production and songwriting credits ==
Year	Artist	Album	Song
N/A	Beyond This Point	—N/a	"Creep" (feat. Jon Bellion)
N/A	The Band Perry	—N/a	"Best One Yet"
N/A	Blaque Keyz	—N/a	"Smooth Movin’" (feat. Jon Bellion)
2011	Blaque Keyz	GripTape and TapeDecks	"Beautifully Human"
2011	Blaque Keyz	GripTape and TapeDecks	"OhVerYorHed" (feat. Jon Bellion)
2011	Blaque Keyz	GripTape and TapeDecks	"SuperVillanThemeMuzik" (feat. Jon Bellion)
2012	Cody Simpson	Paradise	"Back to You"
2012	Brandyn Burnette	Two Thousand Twelve	"Beautiful Beginning"
2012	Brandyn Burnette	Two Thousand Twelve	"Arrest Your Heart"
2012	Brandyn Burnette	Two Thousand Twelve	"Home In No Time"
2012	Brandyn Burnette	Two Thousand Twelve	"Nothing Together"
2012	Brandyn Burnette	Two Thousand Twelve	"Girl Named Summertime"
2013	Eminem (featuring Rihanna)	The Marshall Mathers LP 2	"The Monster"
2013	Jason Derulo	Tattoos	"Trumpets"
2013	Alessandra Amoroso	Amore Puro	"Hell or High Water"
2013	Chester See	—N/a	"Whistle While I Work It" (feat. Wayne Brady, Toby Turner)
2014	Andy Grammer	Magazines or Novels	"Holding Out"
2014	Brandyn Burnette	Punch Lines from a Scattered Mind	"Look Both Ways (Stripped Acoustic)"
2015	C Dot Castro	Don't Over Think	"The Blueprint" (feat. Jon Bellion)
2015	Zedd	True Colors	"Beautiful Now" (feat. Jon Bellion)
2015	CeeLo Green	Heart Blanche	"Robin Williams"
2015	Katharine McPhee	Hysteria	"Damage Control"
2015	Cody Simpson	—N/a	"Surfboard"
2015	Evan Ross	—N/a	"How To Live Alone"
2015	Timeflies	Just For Fun	"Stuck With Me"
2015	Kolidescopes	—N/a	"Back To You"
2015	Blaque Keyz	The Master Key Principles: A Featured Presentation	"Witness Protection" (feat. Beautiful Mind)
2016	MAX	Hell's Kitchen Angel	"Basement Party"
2017	Mod Sun	Movie	"Beautiful Problem"
2018	Christina Aguilera	Liberation	"Fall in Line" (feat. Demi Lovato)
2018	Andy Mineo	II: The Sword	"Friends"
2018	Andy Mineo	II: The Sword	"Shame" (feat. Josh Garrels)
2019	Lauv	How I'm Feeling	"Drugs & the Internet"
2019	Quinn XCII	From Michigan With Love	"Life Must Go On"
2019	Ava Max	—N/a	"Freaking Me Out"
2019	Camila Cabello	Romance	"Shameless"
2019	Camila Cabello	Romance	"Liar"
2019	Halsey	Manic	"Graveyard"
2019	Maroon 5	Jordi	"Memories"
2019	Elley Duhé	—N/a	"Nature"
2019	Illenium	Ascend	Good Things Fall Apart (feat. Jon Bellion)
2019	Goghi	—N/a	"Wolverine"
2019	Lawrence	Hotel TV	"Casualty"
2019	Lawrence	Hotel TV	"It's Not All About You"
2020	Lawrence	Hotel TV	"The Weather"
2020	Lawrence	Hotel TV	"Freckles"
2020	Lauren Jauregui	Birds of Prey	"Invisible Chains"
2020	Monsta X	All About Luv	"You Can't Hold My Heart"
2020	Selena Gomez	Rare	"Vulnerable"
2020	Katy Perry	Smile	"Daisies"
2020	Miley Cyrus	Plastic Hearts	"Midnight Sky"
2020	Miley Cyrus	Plastic Hearts	"Prisoner" (feat. Dua Lipa)
2020	Quinn XCII	A Letter To My Younger Self	"Stacy"
2020	Pentatonix	The Lucky Ones	"Happy Now"
2020	Amy Allen	—N/a	"Difficult"
2020	Amy Allen	—N/a	"Heaven"
2020	Louis The Child	Here For Now	"Little Things" (feat. Quinn XCII, Chelsea Cutler)
2020	Justin Bieber	Justice	"Holy" (feat. Chance the Rapper)
2021	Justin Bieber	Justice	"Anyone"
2021	Justin Bieber	Justice	"Hold On"
2021	Justin Bieber	Justice	"Deserve You"
2021	Justin Bieber	Justice	"Die for You" (feat. Dominic Fike)
2021	Justin Bieber	Justice	"Ghost"
2021	Justin Bieber	Justice	"Loved by You" (feat. Burna Boy)
2021	Justin Bieber	Justice	"I Can't Be Myself" (feat. Jaden)
2021	Justin Bieber	Justice	"Name" (feat. Tori Kelly)
2021	Justin Bieber	Justice	"Hailey"
2021	A Day to Remember	You're Welcome	"Everything We Need"
2021	Rosé	R	"On the Ground"
2021	Ben Platt	Reverie	"Imagine"
2021	Katy Perry	Pokémon 25: The Album	"Electric"
2021	Lawrence	Hotel TV	"Don't Lose Sight"
2021	Lawrence	Hotel TV	"False Alarms" (feat. Jon Bellion)
2021	Lawrence	Hotel TV	"Figure It Out"
2021	Lawrence	Hotel TV	"Don't Move"
2021	Lawrence	Hotel TV	"Jet Lag"
2021	Lawrence	Hotel TV	"Thoughts from the ER"
2021	Lawrence	Hotel TV	"Hotel TV"
2021	Lawrence	Hotel TV	"It's Gonna Be Me" (feat. Brasstracks)
2021	Maroon 5	Jordi	"Memories Remix" (feat. YG, Nipsey Hussle)
2021	Maroon 5	Jordi	"Button" (feat. Tainy, Anuel AA)
2021	Maroon 5	Jordi	"Lost"
2021	Alesso & Marshmello	—N/a	"Chasing Stars" (feat. James Bay)
2022	5 Seconds of Summer	5SOS5	"Me Myself & I"
2022	Selena Gomez	Selena Gomez: My Mind & Me	"My Mind & Me"
2023	Tori Kelly	Tori	"Missin U"
2023	Tori Kelly	Tori	"Shelter"
2023	Tori Kelly	Tori	"Unbelievable" (feat. Ayra Starr)
2023	Tori Kelly	Tori	"Alive If I Die"
2023	Tori Kelly	Tori	"Young Gun" (feat. Jon Bellion)
2023	Jonas Brothers	The Album	"Wings"
2023	Jonas Brothers	The Album	"Waffle House"
2023	Jonas Brothers	The Album	"Miracle"
2023	Jonas Brothers	The Album	"Montana Sky"
2023	Jonas Brothers	The Album	"Sail Away"
2023	Jonas Brothers	The Album	"Americana"
2023	Jonas Brothers	The Album	"Celebrate!"
2023	Jonas Brothers	The Album	"Vacation Eyes"
2023	Jonas Brothers	The Album	"Summer in the Hamptons"
2023	Jonas Brothers	The Album	"Summer Baby"
2023	Jonas Brothers	The Album	"Little Bird"
2023	Jonas Brothers	The Album	"Walls" (feat. Jon Bellion)
2023	Maroon 5	—N/a	"Middle Ground"
2023	Jungkook	—N/a	"Seven" (feat. Latto)
2023	Zayn	—N/a	"Love Like This"
2023	Reneé Rapp	Snow Angel	"The Wedding Song"
2024	Boys World	—N/a	"Caught in Your Love"
2026	Shakira		"Dai Dai" (feat. Burna Boy)
