= Ether (B.o.B album) =

Studio album by B.o.B
- Released: May 12, 2017
- Recorded: 2016–2017
- Genre: Hip-hop
- Length: 45:35
- Labels: No Genre; Empire
- Producers: B.o.B (also exec.); 30 Roc; Big K.R.I.T.; JaqueBeatz

B.o.B chronology
| Elements (2016) | Ether (2017) | The Upside Down (2017) |

Singles from Ether
- 1. "4 Lit" Released: October 28, 2016

Ether is the fourth studio album by American rapper B.o.B, released on May 12, 2017 by Label No Genre, with distribution by Empire Distribution. It is B.o.B's first album to be released independently. The album received generally positive critical response, while it narrowly entered the Billboard 200 at number 179.

The album is the fifth installment in his Element series, which dates back to 2015; the previous four projects were compiled on 2016's Elements. The album features guest appearances from Lil Wayne, Young Thug, T.I., Big K.R.I.T., Ty Dolla Sign, Usher, CeeLo Green, and Young Dro, among others. Production was handled by B.o.B and Big K.R.I.T. themselves, as well as 30 Roc and JaqueBeatz.

== Background ==
B.o.B signed to Atlantic Records in 2008 and would go on to release his major-label debut, The Adventures of Bobby Ray, with the label in 2010. Having released multiple projects with Atlantic, including three extended plays (EPs), three studio albums and a retail mixtape, the two sides separated soon after B.o.B claimed that the label was "suppressing" him. "There's a ban on BoB," he wrote on Twitter, before diving into his issues with his then-label. "They boycott me, they are afraid I'll get too much exposure," he continued. "My own label doesn't even promote my albums, mixtapes, shows or events... ZERO promo." Since his split with Atlantic, B.o.B. ventured off with his label No Genre and partnered up with Empire Distribution.

If you look at my career, there's been a story arc. On The Adventures of Bobby Ray, Bobby goes on an adventure. He smokes some Strange Clouds afterwards. Then, he goes to the nightclub and does urban music in Underground Luxury. He takes some psychedelic mushrooms, has an awakening, and drops conscious projects like Psycadelik Thoughtz. Now, I want to take everything and have fun in this culmination called ETHER. I’ve always believed knowledge plus experience equals wisdom. The experience is kicking in.

— B.o.B in an April 2017 interview.

On December 4, 2015, B.o.B released a mixtape titled WATER (We Are The Enemy Really). B.o.B would continue the trend with three more mixtapes; FIRE (False Idols Ruin Egos), EARTH (Educational Avatar Reality Training Habitat) and AIR (Art Imitates Reality). On November 4, 2016, B.o.B released a compilation of the mixtapes, with the anthology titled Elements. On April 1, 2017, B.o.B wrote on Twitter, "isn't there a fifth element". On April 5, B.o.B unveiled the cover art for a project titled Ether, which prompted a fan to ask "is this the album or the fifth element," to which B.o.B responded "both". The series reference the classical elements which typically refer to the concepts in Ancient Greece, of earth, water, air, fire, and aether, which were proposed to explain the nature and complexity of all matter in terms of simpler substances.

In May 2017, in an interview with B-Real of Cypress Hill, B.o.B spoke on the thought process when creating Ether, not forcing his beliefs on fans, and why the album is a less conscious project than the rest of the Elements series: "some of it's fun, [some of it is to make you think], but even if it's to make you think, it's still just good music. It's gotta be about the music first". In an interview with Fuse, B.o.B revealed he had plans to record his Elements series dating back to since before he released his debut album in 2010, adding his first album "was all about the elements", citing its cover art, which includes earth, water, fire and air in the artwork. When speaking in the subject B.o.B said: "Ether refers to the etheric realm in which all matter and all energy move through. A lot of the Eastern traditions and beliefs recognize ch'i, the energy that you can't see. It's the unseen."

== Recording and production ==
B.o.B said his decision to include guest appearances came from the previous installments in his Elements series not having any at all: "For this Ether project I kinda opened the doorway for more outside influences, because the Elements project I put out, it was all me, I didn't want nobody touching it, because it had to be that way. But to finish it off with the fifth element, I just felt like I wanted to really make it more of a grandiose grand finale". In an interview with Complex, B.o.B said: "All the features is just really people who I fuck with. I don't collaborate with everybody, man, and I'm at a point where […] I just want to [work] with people who I gel with and vibe with. Even if I collaborate with the same artist six times, I'm still going to keep doing it." It was revealed in an interview that the album's fourth track "Peace Piece", featuring vocals and production from Big K.R.I.T., was originally given to T.I. for his Us or Else: Letter to the System project. In an interview with Fuse, B.o.B said he produced about half of the album, adding "Jacque Beatz and 30 Roc did a lot of production."

== Release and promotion ==
"4 Lit" featuring fellow rapper T.I. and singer Ty Dolla Sign, was released as the album's lead single on October 28, 2016. It is the first song released by B.o.B's independent record label, No Genre, as a single. The music video for the song, directed by Chad Tennies, premiered on April 5, 2017. On April 19, 2017, B.o.B announced a concert tour, The Elements Tour, in support of the album. On May 3, 2017, B.o.B revealed the album's track-listing and released the song "Xantastic", featuring rapper Young Thug, as a promotional single, making it available on the iTunes Store for those who pre-ordered the album. On May 11, 2017 B.o.B held a "listening experience" for Ether at Studio No. 7 in Atlanta, Georgia.

== Critical reception ==
Professional ratings
Review scores
| Source | Rating |
|---|---|
| AllMusic | 3/5 stars |
| HipHopDX | 4/5 stars |
| Music Connection | 7/10 stars |
| XXL | (XL) |

Ether received generally positive reviews. Joe Coad of HipHop-N-More.com wrote: "On Ether, B.o.B has strong views, strong theories, but luckily even stronger music. There is little to no chance that he will return to the heights that he once occupied in 2010, but it doesn't seem like his fans or him are too concerned about that these days. Truth is, that the music here doesn't stray too far from what he was creating during his chart topping days and what's really changed is the public's perception of him, unfortunately. Mainstream success and sales may have fallen to the wayside, but Ether is a step back towards the spotlight for B.o.B".

In an article for XXL, the editor gave the album a four out of five, writing: "Focusing more on showcasing his lyricism and prowess as an MC rather than scoring pop smashes, B.o.B shines throughout the album's 12 tracks, proving himself to be equally effective as a soloist as he is a collaborator. B.o.B may have lost his footing along the way, but Ether is a step in the right direction and an admirable effort that proves he's still one of the more talented artists out of the South."

== Track listing ==
| No. | Title | Writer(s) | Producer(s) | Length |
|---|---|---|---|---|
| 1. | "Fan Mail" | Bobby Simmons, Jr. | B.o.B | 2:10 |
| 2. | "E.T." (featuring Lil Wayne) | Simmons, Jr.; Dwayne Carter, Jr. | B.o.B | 3:29 |
| 3. | "Middle Man / Mr. Mister" | Simmons, Jr.; Samuel Gloade | 30 Roc; B.o.B | 6:52 |
| 4. | "Peace Piece" (featuring Big K.R.I.T.) | Simmons, Jr.; Justin Scott | Big K.R.I.T.; B.o.B | 4:17 |
| 5. | "Finesse" | Simmons, Jr.; Gloade | 30 Roc | 2:52 |
| 6. | "Xantastic" (featuring Young Thug) | Simmons, Jr.; Jeffery Williams; Gloade | 30 Roc | 3:24 |
| 7. | "Tweakin" (featuring Young Dro and London Jae) | Simmons, Jr.; D'Juan Hart; Jacquez Lowe; Jhaun Downer | B.o.B; JaqueBeatz | 4:14 |
| 8. | "4 Lit" (featuring T.I. and Ty Dolla $ign) | Simmons, Jr.; Clifford Harris; Tyrone Griffin; Gloade | 30 Roc | 3:23 |
| 9. | "Substance Abuse" | Simmons, Jr.; Downer | JaqueBeatz; B.o.B | 3:52 |
| 10. | "Avalanche" | Simmons, Jr.; Downer | JaqueBeatz; B.o.B | 3:28 |
| 11. | "I Know" (featuring WurlD) | Simmons, Jr.; Sadiq Onifade; Downer | B.o.B; JaqueBeatz | 3:51 |
| 12. | "Big Kids" (featuring CeeLo Green and Usher) | Simmons, Jr.; Thomas Calloway; Usher Raymond IV; Downer | B.o.B; JaqueBeatz | 3:32 |
| Total length: | | | | 45:35 |

== Charts ==
| Chart (2017) | Peak position |
|---|---|
| US Billboard 200 | 179 |
