= What It Means to Be King =

Studio album by King Von
- Released: March 4, 2022
- Genre: Hip hop; drill; gangsta rap
- Length: 48:51
- Label: Empire; Only the Family
- Producer: ATL Jacob; Bankroll Got It; CGM Beats; Chopsquad DJ; Diego Ave; DJ Bandz; DJ FMCT; Geraldo Liive; Glaazer; Hitmaka; John Lam; Kid Hazel; MP808; Raw Equity; Tee Romano; TM88; Too Dope; Touch of Trent

King Von chronology
Welcome to O'Block (2020)	What It Means to Be King (2022)	Grandson (2023)

Singles from What It Means to Be King
- 1. "Grandson for President" Released: April 29, 2020; 2. "Don't Play That" Released: February 4, 2022; 3. "War" Released: March 2, 2022

Professional ratings
Review scores
Source	Rating
AllMusic	3/5 stars
HipHopDX	3.5/5 stars
HotNewHipHop	75%

What It Means to Be King is the second studio album by American rapper King Von. It was posthumously released through Empire Distribution and Only the Family on March 4, 2022. The album features guest appearances from G Herbo, 21 Savage, Fivio Foreign, Moneybagg Yo, Lil Durk, Tee Grizzley, A Boogie wit da Hoodie, Dreezy, Boss Top, DqFrmDaO, and OMB Peezy. Production was handled by Chopsquad DJ, Hitmaka, Tee Romano, Kid Hazel, Touch of Trent, DJ Bandz, DJ FMCT, Glaazer, Diego Ave, Bankroll Got It, TM88, ATL Jacob, Geraldo Liive, CGM Beats, John Lam, and Raw Equity. The album marks Von's first posthumous project and serves as the follow-up to his previous album, Welcome to O'Block (2020).

== Background ==
On November 6, 2020, King Von was fatally shot outside a hookah lounge in Atlanta, Georgia, exactly one week after the release of his previous album, Welcome to O'Block (2020). The same day of his death, American rapper Pooh Shiesty released his single, "Back in Blood", which features Von's Only the Family label boss, fellow rapper Lil Durk. Von made his first posthumous cameo appearance in the music video for the song, which was released on January 2, 2021, in which the title of his album was revealed.

== Release and promotion ==
"Grandson for President", was released on April 29, 2020, in the period between the releasing of Levon James mixtape and Welcome to O'Block studio album, but remaining a standalone single; the song was later merged with What It Means to Be King album, effectively representing the lead single of the posthumous project.

In fact, the second and third singles primarily functioned as promotional means for the album's commercial success. The single "Don't Play That", which King Von had anticipated in October 2020 with an Instagram post, was revealed to be a collaboration with Atlanta-based rapper 21 Savage, produced by Kid Hazel, it was released on February 4, 2022. That same day Von's estate shared the title and release date of the album, exactly one month before its release. An official music video for the song was released later on February 9. On February 28, 2022, they shared the album cover art and made the album available for pre-order on Apple Music, with the tracklist also revealed on Apple Music the following day. Finally the third single, "War", produced by Chopsquad DJ, was released on March 2, 2022, two days before the album's release, and it was accompanied by an official visualizer video. Both singles entered the Billboard Hot 100 chart, achieving positions 40 and 71, respectively.

Following the release of the album, two music videos were released for two tracks from the project. The first music video was for "Too Real" that was released shortly thereafter the album release, on March 7, 2022. The second music video was for "Get It Done" song with OMB Peezy and was released on August 9, 2022, in honor of what would have been King Von's 28th birthday.

== Commercial performance ==
What It Means to Be King debuted at number 2 on the US Billboard 200 chart, earning 59,000 album-equivalent units, 55,000 came from 79 million in streams, and 4,000 from pure album sales. The album represents the second top 10 on the Billboard 200 for King Von, and marks his highest position on the charts to date. He first reached the top 10 with his 2020 debut studio album, Welcome to O’Block which peaked at number 5. The album also claimed the top spot on the Top R&B/Hip-Hop Albums chart, and secured the number 2 position on the Top Independent Albums chart. It also peaked at number 3 on the Billboard Canadian Albums chart.

== Track listing ==
What It Means to Be King track listing
No.	Title	Writer(s)	Producer(s)	Length
1.	"Where I'm From"	Dayvon Bennett; Darrell Jackson	Chopsquad DJ	1:38
2.	"War"	Bennett; Jackson	Chopsquad DJ	2:40
3.	"Facetime" (featuring G Herbo)	Bennett; Herbert Wright III; Christian Ward; Terrence Williams	Hitmaka; Tee Romano	2:36
4.	"Don't Play That" (with 21 Savage)	Bennett; Shayaa Abraham-Joseph; Ahmar Bailey	Kid Hazel	2:13
5.	"Straight to It" (featuring Fivio Foreign)	Bennett; Maxie Ryles III; Jackson	Chopsquad DJ	2:58
6.	"Trust Nothing" (featuring Moneybagg Yo)	Bennett; Demario White, Jr.; Jackson	Chopsquad DJ	3:05
7.	"Evil Twins" (with Lil Durk)	Bennett; Durk Banks; Trenton Turner	Touch of Trent	1:55
8.	"Too Real"	Bennett; Devonte Richmond; Maliki Decampos; Gunnlaugur Sumarlidason	DJ Bandz; DJ FMCT; Glaazer	1:45
9.	"Rich Gangsta" (featuring Tee Grizzley)	Bennett; Terry Wallace, Jr.; Ward; Diego Avendano; Joel Banks; Taylor Banks	Hitmaka; Diego Ave; Bankroll Got It	2:45
10.	"Mad"	Bennett; Jackson	Chopsquad DJ	2:04
11.	"My Fault" (with A Boogie wit da Hoodie)	Bennett; Artist Dubose; Jackson	Chopsquad DJ	3:11
12.	"Change My Life"	Bennett; Jackson	Chopsquad DJ	2:40
13.	"Hard to Trust" (featuring Dreezy)	Bennett; Seandrea Sledge; Bryan Simmons; Jacob Canady; Lesidney Ragland; Terrell McNeal	TM88; ATL Jacob; Too Dope^{[a]}; MP808^{[a]}	3:26
14.	"Get Back" (featuring Boss Top and DqFrmDaO)	Bennett; Tyree Davis; DqFrmDaO; Jackson	Chopsquad DJ	2:40
15.	"Get It Done" (with OMB Peezy)	Bennett; LeParis Dade; Jackson	Chopsquad DJ	2:44
16.	"Chase the Bag"	Bennett; Geraldo Mejia; CGM Beats	Geraldo Liive; CGM Beats	2:24
17.	"Go n Get Em" (featuring Boss Top)	Bennett; Davis; John Lam	Lam	2:46
18.	"Grandson for President"	Bennett; Jackson	Chopsquad DJ	2:17
19.	"Family Dedication Outro"	Bennett; Raw Equity	Raw Equity	2:56
Total length:				48:51

Note:

- ^{^[a]} signifies a co-producer.

Samples

- "Grandson for President" contains a sample of "Knuck If You Buck" as performed by Crime Mob featuring Lil Scrappy, written by Jarques Usher, Chris Henderson, Jonathan Lewis, Venetia Lewis and Brittany Carpentero.

== Charts ==
=== Weekly charts ===
Weekly chart performance for What It Means to Be King
Chart (2022)	Peak position
Belgian Albums (Ultratop Flanders)	141
Canadian Albums (Billboard)	3
UK Albums (OCC)	63
UK R&B Albums (OCC)	35
US Billboard 200	2
US Independent Albums (Billboard)	2
US Top R&B/Hip-Hop Albums (Billboard)	1

=== Year-end charts ===
Year-end chart performance for What It Means to Be King
Chart (2022)	Position
US Top R&B/Hip-Hop Albums (Billboard)	85
