= Flatline (disambiguation) =

Flatline may mean:

- Flatline, an electrical time sequence measurement that shows no activity. Thus:
  - In heart function, asystole
  - In brain function, a flat electroencephalogram, where the brain shows no electrical activity (brain death)

== Music ==
- Flatline (album), a 1997 album by MC Breed
- "Flatline" (B.o.B song), 2016
- "Flatline" (Mutya Keisha Siobhan song), 2013, re-released in 2022
- "Flatline" (Nelly Furtado song), 2017
- "Flatline", a song by 5 Seconds Of Summer from 5SOS5
- "Flatline", a song by Exo from Reverxe
- "Flatline", a song by Justin Bieber from Journals

== Other ==
- "Flatline" (Doctor Who), 2014 TV episode
- Flatline, Tippmann company's Flatline Barrel System for paintball
- Flatlining, budget freeze

== See also ==
- Flatliner (disambiguation)
- Flat (disambiguation)
