= Back and Forth =

Back and Forth or Back and Fourth may refer to:

== Film and TV ==
- Blackadder: Back & Forth, the last installment in the Blackadder series
- Back and Forth (film), a 1969 film directed by Michael Snow
- Foo Fighters: Back and Forth, a 2011 documentary of the band Foo Fighters

== Music ==
=== Albums ===
- Back and Fourth (Pete Yorn album), 2009
- Back and Fourth (Lindisfarne album), 1978
- Back & Forth (EP), self-published debut EP of Skinny Puppy 1984

=== Songs ===
- "Back & Forth" (Aaliyah song), 1994
- "Back and Forth" (B.o.B song), 2015
- "Back and Forth" (Cameo song), 1987
- "Back & Forth" (MK, Jonas Blue and Becky Hill song), 2018
- "Back and Forth" (Operator Please song), 2010
- Back and Forth (Kehlani song), 2026
- "Back and Forth", by the Fat Boys from Coming Back Hard Again, 1988
- "Back and Forth", by Freddie Green from Mr. Rhythm, 1955
- "Back and Forth", by Audiovent from Dirty Sexy Knights in Paris, 2002
- "Back and Forth", by State Champs from Around the World and Back, 2015

== Other ==
- Back-and-forth method, a method of showing isomorphism between countably infinite structures satisfying specified conditions
