= Manny Marroquin =

American mixing engineer (born 1971)

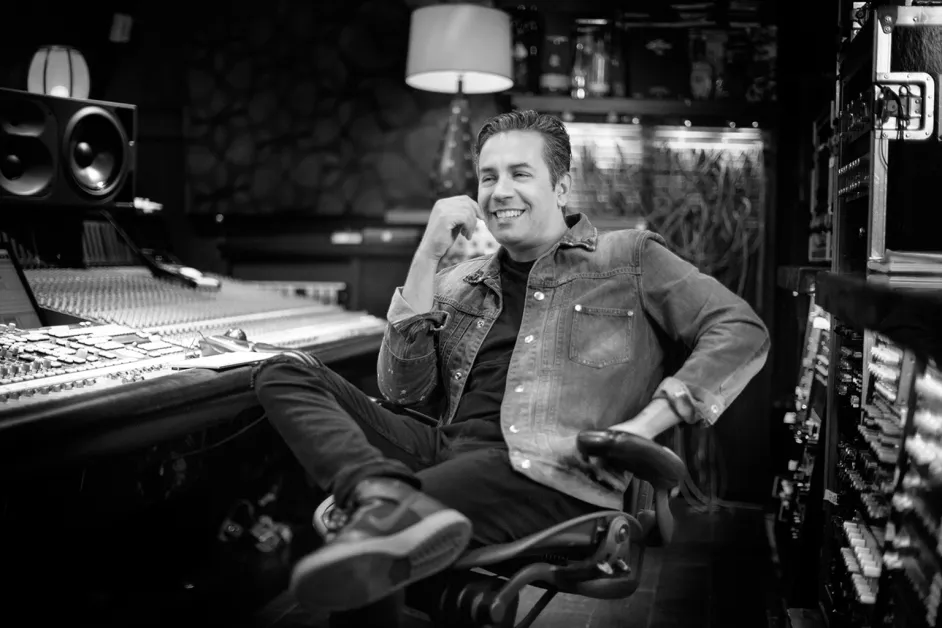
- Marroquin in 2019

Background information
- Born: September 21, 1971 (age 54); Guatemala City, Guatemala
- Origin: Los Angeles, California, U.S.
- Genres: Pop; R&B; hip hop; rock
- Occupations: Record engineer; mixer
- Years active: 1993–present
- Website: mannymarroquin.com

Manny Marroquin (born September 21, 1971) is a Guatemalan-American record mixing engineer. He has been credited on albums for high-profile pop, R&B, hip hop and rock acts. He has worked with artists including Rihanna, Kanye West, Katy Perry, Rosalía, the Weeknd, Justin Bieber, Post Malone, Bruno Mars, John Mayer, 2Pac, Mariah Carey, John Legend, Alicia Keys, Sia, Lana Del Rey, SZA, Kendrick Lamar, Lizzo, and Glass Animals, among others. Marroquin has won 14 Grammy Awards from 43 nominations, as well as four Latin Grammy Awards. He has worked from Larrabee Studios since 2001.

== Life and career ==
Marroquin's family relocated to Los Angeles, California when he was nine years old due to the Guatemalan Civil War. As a student at Alexander Hamilton High School in Los Angeles, Marroquin had access to the school's recording studio, where he recorded demos for other students, and decided he wanted to pursue mixing. Despite college scholarship offers, he followed a teacher's advice to take an entry-level studio job instead; after graduating, he began working at Enterprise Studios as a runner and worked his way up to an engineering position. His professional breakthrough occurred during a late-night studio session when a producer asked him for a rough mix. Impressed by Marroquin's work, the producer entrusted him with mixing the entire album, though it ultimately went unreleased.

In 2001, he started working out of Larrabee Studios, and as the studio sought new ownership in 2005, Marroquin assumed control and has since operated the facility. In 2015, he began building a sound studio with the intention of putting a restaurant inside of it.

Marroquin won his first Grammy in 2000 for Mary Mary's album, Thankful. In 2004, he received two Grammys for Album of the Year for Kanye West's The College Dropout, and Alicia Keys' The Diary of Alicia Keys. He won another Grammy for his work on the album Get Lifted by John Legend in 2005, and Battle Studies by John Mayer in 2011. The Grammy Museum, which opened in Los Angeles in December 2008, acknowledged Marroquin's musical achievement with its mixing exhibit. The interactive exhibit allowed players to mix a track under the guidance of Marroquin.

In 2013, Marroquin collaborated with Waves Audio, a developer of audio plugins and signal processors. Together, they launched a collection of virtual instrument effects. Each plugin was designed to reflect Marroquin's approach to sound design.

In 2022, Audeze, a manufacturer of high-end audio equipment, announced a partnership with Marroquin, resulting in the release of a line of headphones designed for both studio and personal use. The MM-500s and MM-100s were the flagship products of this collaboration.

Marroquin has also worked with Sonos since 2012, assisting the manufacturer of smart speakers and sound systems with the audio tuning of their products.

== Selected discography ==
Year	Artist	Title
1995	Seal	"Don't Cry"
1996	Toni Braxton	Secrets
1997	2Pac	R U Still Down? (Remember Me)
1999	Warren G	I Want It All
2000	Mary Mary	Thankful
2000	Sisqó	Unleash the Dragon
2000	Pink	Can't Take Me Home
2001	Alicia Keys	Songs in A Minor
2001	Sisqó	Return of Dragon
2002	Mario	Mario
2002	Santana	Shaman
2003	Alicia Keys	The Diary
2004	Twista	Kamikaze
2004	John Legend	Get Lifted
2004	Kanye West	The College Dropout
2005	Faith Evans	The First Lady
2005	Mariah Carey	The Emancipation of Mimi
2005	Natasha Bedingfield	Unwritten
2005	Kanye West	Late Registration
2005	Anthony Hamilton	Soulife
2005	Twista	The Day After
2005	Common	Be
2006	Janet Jackson	Damita Jo
2006	T.I.	King
2006	Fantasia	Fantasia
2006	John Mayer	Continuum
2007	Rihanna	Good Girl Gone Bad
2007	Kanye West	Graduation
2007	Alicia Keys	As I Am
2008	Kanye West	808s & Heartbreak
2008	John Legend	Evolver
2008	Los Lonely Boys	Forgiven
2008	Brandy	Human
2008	Jazmine Sullivan	Fearless
2008	Anastacia	Heavy Rotation
2008	Mary Mary	"Get Up"
2008	Usher	Here I Stand
2008	Empire of the Sun	"Walking on a Dream"
2010	CeeLoo Green	The Lady Killer
2010	Rihanna	Loud
2010	Kanye West	My Beautiful Dark Twisted Fantasy
2010	Miguel	All I Want Is You
2011	Pitbull	Planet Pit
2011	Rihanna	Talk That Talk
2012	Lana Del Rey	Born to Die
2012	Imagine Dragons	Continued Silence EP
2012	Fun	Some Nights
2012	Linkin Park	Living Things
2012	Nelly Furtado	The Spirit Indestructible
2012	Imagine Dragons	Night Visions
2012	Miguel	Kaleidoscope Dream
2012	Taylor Swift	Red
2012	Rihanna	Unapologetic
2012	Bruno Mars	Unorthodox Jukebox
2013	Tegan and Sara	Heartthrob
2013	Tyler, the Creator	Wolf
2013	Katy Perry	Prism
2014	Enrique Iglesias	Sex and Love
2014	Sia	1000 Forms of Fear
2015	Imagine Dragons	Smoke + Mirrors
2015	Raury	All We Need
2015	X Ambassadors	VHS
2015	Justin Bieber	Purpose
2016	Sia	This Is Acting
2016	Alessia Cara	Know-It-All
2016	Charlie Puth	Nine Track Mind
2016	Rihanna	ANTI
2016	DJ Khaled	Major Key
2016	Kanye West	The Life of Pablo
2016	Machine Gun Kelly and Camila Cabello	"Bad Things"
2016	Meghan Trainor	Thank You
2016	Zayn	Mind of Mine
2016	The Weeknd	Starboy
2017	John Mayer	The Search for Everything
2018	Camila Cabello	"She Loves Control"
2018	Thirty Seconds to Mars	America
2018	Post Malone	Beerbongs & Bentleys
2018	Pharrell Williams and Camila Cabello	"Sangria Wine"
2018	Mac Miller	Swimming
2018	Charlie Puth	Voicenotes
2018	Jon Bellion	Glory Sound Prep
2019	Lizzo	Cuz I Love You
2019	Ed Sheeran	No.6 Collaborations Project
2019	Post Malone	Hollywood's Bleeding
2019	FKA Twigs	Magdalene
2019	Ramage featuring Nicki Minaj	Ya Lil
2020	Selena Gomez	Rare
2020	Katy Perry	Smile
2021	Post Malone	Motley Crew
2022	Charli XCX	Crash
2022	Camila Cabello	Familia
2022	Kendrick Lamar	Mr. Morale & the Big Steppers
2022	Post Malone	Twelve Carat Toothache
2022	Rosalía	Motomami
2022	Lizzo	Special
2022	Demi Lovato	Holy Fvck
2022	Phoenix	Alpha Zulu
2022	Marshmello featuring Nancy Ajram	Sah Sah
2022	Hiba Tawaji and Luis Fonsi	Que Sera Sera (Law Nebka Sawa)
2023	Paramore	This Is Why
2023	ATEEZ	Crazy Form (미친 폼)
2024	Charli XCX	Brat
2024	Nelly Furtado	7
2025	Hayley Williams	Ego Death at a Bachelorette Party
2025	Jon Bellion	Father Figure
2025	Demi Lovato	It's Not That Deep
2025	Rosalía	Lux
2026	Ella Mai	Do You Still Love Me?
2026	Ryan Beatty	Sweet Fortune
2026	Charlie Puth	Whatever's Clever!
2026	The Kid Laroi	Sleep

== Grammy Awards ==
The Grammy Awards are presented annually by The Recording Academy. Marroquin has received 14 wins from 48 nominations as of 2023.

Year	Category	Work	Result
2001	Best Contemporary Soul Gospel Album	Thankful	Won
2004	Best Dance Recording	"Love One Another"	Nominated
2005	Album of the Year	The Diary of Alicia Keys	Nominated
2005	Album of the Year	Confessions	Nominated
2005	Album of the Year	The College Dropout	Nominated
2005	Best Rap Album	The College Dropout	Won
2005	Best R&B Album	The Diary of Alicia Keys	Won
2006	Best R&B Album	Get Lifted	Won
2006	Album of the Year	The Emancipation of Mimi	Nominated
2006	Album of the Year	Late Registration	Nominated
2007	Album of the Year	Continuum	Nominated
2008	Album of the Year	Graduation	Nominated
2008	Record of the Year	"Umbrella"	Nominated
2011	Record of the Year	"Fuck You"	Nominated
2011	Best Engineered Album, Non-Classical	"Battle Studies"	Won
2012	Album of the Year	Doo Wops & Hooligans	Nominated
2012	Album of the Year	Loud	Nominated
2012	Record of the Year	"Grenade"	Nominated
2013	Album of the Year	Some Nights	Nominated
2014	Album of the Year	Red	Nominated
2014	Record of the Year	"Radioactive"	Nominated
2014	Record of the Year	"Locked Out of Heaven"	Nominated
2014	Best R&B Album	Girl on Fire	Won
2014	Best Pop Vocal Album	Unorthodox Jukebox	Won
2014	Best Urban Contemporary Album	Unapologetic	Won
2015	Record of the Year	"Chandelier	Nominated
2017	Record of the Year	"Work"	Nominated
2017	Album of the Year	Purpose	Nominated
2019	Album of the Year	Beerbongs & Bentleys	Nominated
2019	Best Rap Album	Swimming	Nominated
2019	Best Engineered Album, Non-Classical	Head Over Heels	Nominated
2019	Best Engineered Album, Non-Classical	Voicenotes	Nominated
2019	Record of the Year	"Rockstar"	Nominated
2020	Record of the Year	"Truth Hurts"	Nominated
2020	Record of the Year	"Sunflower (Spider-Man: Into the Spider-Verse)"	Nominated
2020	Best Urban Contemporary Album	Cuz I Love You (Deluxe)	Won
2020	Album of the Year	Cuz I Love You (Deluxe)	Nominated
2021	Album of the Year	Hollywood's Bleeding	Nominated
2021	Record of the Year	"Circles"	Nominated
2022	Album of the Year	Back of My Mind	Nominated
2022	Album of the Year	Montero	Nominated
2022	Album of the Year	We Are	Won
2022	Record of the Year	"Freedom"	Nominated
2023	Album of the Year	Good Morning Gorgeous (Deluxe)	Nominated
2023	Album of the Year	Mr. Morale & The Big Steppers	Nominated
2023	Album of the Year	Special	Nominated
2023	Best Latin Rock or Alternative Album	Motomami	Won
2023	Best Rap Album	Mr. Morale & The Big Steppers	Won
2023	Record of the Year	"About Damn Time"	Won
Best Rock Album	"Paramore"	Won	
