= Conversations with My Wife =

2018 song by Jon Bellion

Single by Jon Bellion

from the album Glory Sound Prep
- Released: October 19, 2018
- Recorded: 2018
- Genre: Dream pop; electronic
- Length: 3:26
- Label: Visionary; Capitol
- Songwriters: Jon Bellion; Raul Cubina; Mark Williams
- Producers: Jon Bellion; Raul Cubina; Mark Williams

Jon Bellion singles chronology
"Overwhelming" (2017)	"Conversations with My Wife" (2018)	"JT" (2018)

"Conversations with My Wife" is a song by American singer Jon Bellion. It was released to digital retailers on October 19, 2018, through Visionary Music Group and Capitol Records, as the lead single from his second studio album, Glory Sound Prep (2018). Bellion produced and co-wrote the song along with Mark Williams and Raul Cubina, a duo jointly known as Ojivolta.

== Background ==
The single was announced via Jon Bellion's Twitter account on October 17, 2018, alongside a 27 second snippet of the song.

== Critical reception ==
Larisha Paul of Earmilk reviewed the song stating "The dreampop sound of "Conversations with my Wife" isn't as heavy as similar sounding tracks of his, which is fitting for the track's overall message and tone." Writing for The Guardian Nigeria, Njideka Agbo said "the electronic song is worth the wait as it will whet your appetite."
