= Scotty ATL =

American rapper

- Scotty ATL in 2022

Background information
- Also known as: Scotty
- Origin: Atlanta, Georgia, U.S.
- Genre: Hip hop
- Occupations: Rapper; songwriter; record producer
- Years active: 2010–present
- Labels: Cool Club; Label No Genre
- Website: scottyatl.com

Walter Scott Williams, known professionally as Scotty ATL, is an American actor, entrepreneur, rapper, record producer, and songwriter.

== Early life ==
ATL attributes his interest in hip-hop to both of his parents, noting that his mother would often play 2Pac around the house. As he grew older, he took a serious interest in music, along with a friend, King J, who was a rapper. ATL created a recording studio in his family's basement and started to record CDs to sell at school.

Upon graduating from Redan High School in Atlanta, Scotty attended Savannah State University to play basketball. He rededicated himself to music and, as part of the group Monopoly Fleet that he had formed in high school, released an album titled 2339 Underground Boyz. While still in college, Scotty and Monopoly Fleet signed a record deal following the release of 2339 Underground Boyz and began traveling from Atlanta to Savannah to focus on recording a new album, though the deal ultimately fell through. With the failed deal behind him, Scotty moved back to Atlanta and "got involved in the whole little street life," focusing less on music.

== Career ==
Scotty ATL formed his own label imprint, Cool Club. He released projects such as In the Meantime, The Jiffy Cornbread Experience, F.A.I.T.H. (Forever Atlanta in the Heart), In the Meantime 2, and SPAGHETTI Junction. In 2014, he joined forces with Grammy-nominated artist B.o.B.'s No Genre imprint and embarked on a nationwide tour billed as the Cool Club Tour. The following year, he was featured on the remix to Curren$y's "Cloud IX" and followed the appearance up with The Cooligan, a 16-track project hosted by DJ Scream and DJ Mike Mars. The mixtape featured collaborations with Curren$y, CyHi The Prynce, 8Ball, Devin The Dude, and B.O.B., with production credits to KE On The Track, DJ Burn One, and Drumma Boy.

Eventually he caught the attention of No Genre label president B.o.B. and was invited to perform with him on stage at the 20th anniversary of Hot 107.9's birthday bash in 2015. He also performed on the Next to Blow stage on the same day. He then hit the road for the No Genre Tour in 2015 and lent his talents to open for Big K.R.I.T. in 29 cities. Scotty ATL also appeared on the now-defunct BET program 106 & Park, where he did a backroom freestyle.

Scotty ATL created the No Handouts Tour with a mix of established and emerging rappers in a number of key cities throughout the southeastern region. He is the owner of, Grillz by Scotty, an Atlanta-based jewelry business that has supplied custom gold mouthpieces to rap counterparts such as Trinidad James, Rich Homie Quan, K Camp, Killer Mike, and Trouble.

== Discography ==
=== EPs ===
- OTR2SJ (2014)
- The Couch Potato EP (2024)

=== Mixtapes ===
- Summer Dreams (2011)
- In the Meantime (2012)
- The Jiffy Cornbread Experience (2012)
- F.A.I.T.H. (Forever Atlanta In The Heart) [2013]
- In The Meantime 2 (2014)
- SPAGHETTI Junction (2014)
- Traffic Jamz (2015)
- The Cooligan (2015)
- Live & Direct (with B.o.B) [2016]
- Unplugged: Scotty Live from Smiths Olde Bar (2016)
- Home Sick (2016)
- Who shot Cupid? (with Drumma Boy) [2017]
- OTW (2018)
- It's Time (2018)
- Streams (2019)
- Trappin Gold (2021)
- Candler Road to Melrose (2022)
