= Flatliner =

Flatliner may refer to:

- A person whose brain or cardiac activity is measured as a flatline
- The Flatliners, a Canadian ska punk rock band
- 4-Methylthioamphetamine, a psychoactive drug
- Flatliners, a 1990 science fiction psychological horror film directed by Joel Schumacher
- Flatliners (2017 film), a 2017 remake of the 1990 film, directed by Niels Arden Oplev
- "Flatliner" (song), a song by Cole Swindell and Dierks Bentley
- Another name for the Reverse STO, a professional wrestling move
- Flatlinerz, a band

== See also ==
- Flatline (disambiguation)
