= Flatline (B.o.B song) =

Song by B.o.B

from the album E.A.R.T.H. (Educational Avatar Reality Training Habitat)
- Released: January 26, 2016
- Recorded: 2016
- Genre: Political hip hop
- Length: 3:29
- Label: No Genre
- Songwriters: Bobby Ray Simmons, Jr.
- Producer: B.o.B

"Flatline" is a song by American rapper B.o.B, initially released on SoundCloud in January 2016. It is a diss track aimed at physicist Neil DeGrasse Tyson, whom he had gotten into an argument with on Twitter, over B.o.B's stated belief that the Earth is flat. The lyrics to the song refer to science as a cult.

== Reception ==
Vulture music critic Nate Jones commented, "It's called 'Flatline,' which is both a reference to the horizon of the Earth and also a fitting description of B.o.B's career."

Following criticism, B.o.B removed the song from his SoundCloud account, but it survives on YouTube and other sites where it was reposted. In April 2016, B.o.B included the song on a mixtape titled E.A.R.T.H. (Educational Avatar Reality Training Habitat), but the song lyrics had been rewritten as titled as pt. 2.

In response to B.o.B's Twitter arguments with Neil deGrasse Tyson, the latter's nephew, an amateur rapper using the stage name Ellect, released a diss track of his own titled "Flat to Fact" which echoes several of his uncle's talking points and features Tyson himself providing spoken word interjections.
