= Don't Miss =

Single by King Von

from the album Grandson
- Released: July 14, 2023
- Genre: Hip hop; drill
- Length: 2:02
- Label: Only the Family; Empire
- Songwriter(s): Dayvon Bennett
- Producer(s): ATL Jacob; Mac Fly

King Von singles chronology
"Heartless" (2023)	"Don't Miss" (2023)

Music video
- "King Von - Don't Miss (Official Video)" on YouTube

"Don't Miss" is a song by American rapper King Von. It was released with a music video on July 14, 2023, as the third single and in conjunction with his third studio album Grandson.

== Music video ==
On July 13, 2023, was announced on King Von official Instagram page, that a music video for the track would have been released the following day. The video was released the 14th at midnight GMT-5, with the album release time matching. The footage shows Bennett with two of his other O'block friends, DQ and Youngin. The set is a Christian church at a supposed funeral where an empty coffin with a flower inside is shown.

== Charts ==
Chart performance for "Don't Miss"
Chart (2023)	Peak position
New Zealand Hot Singles (RMNZ)	36
US Hot R&B/Hip-Hop Songs (Billboard)	42
