= Da' Nic =

EP by TIP
- Released: September 11, 2015
- Genre: Hip hop
- Length: 19:31
- Labels: King Inc.; Grand Hustle; Empire Distribution
- Producers: Jazzfeezy; League of Starz; London on da Track; Mars; Scena; Shonuff; TNB Beatz

TIP chronology
Paperwork (2014)	Da' Nic (2015)	Us or Else (2016)

Singles from Da' Nic
- 1. "Project Steps" Released: March 11, 2015; 2. "Check, Run It" Released: September 4, 2015

Da' Nic is the second extended play (EP) by American rapper TIP, released via digital distribution on September 11, 2015, by King Inc. The EP, which serves as a precursor to TIP's tenth studio album Dime Trap, features guest appearances from Young Dro and Young Thug. The EP's production was handled by Jazzfeezy, League of Starz, London on da Track, Mars, Scena, Shonuff & TNB Beatz.

== Background ==
After multiple mentions of the date September 11, on his official Instagram page, TIP unexpectedly released Da' Nic, on the aforementioned date. According to a press release, T.I. returning to his original moniker Tip, coincided with the EP's release. The EP's title is inspired by the slang term for a nickel bag of cannabis. Da' Nic marks TIP's first ever independent release.

After releasing his ninth studio album Paperwork via Columbia Records, Tip had once again become a free agent, having ended his previous contract with Atlantic Records, after issuing his eighth album Trouble Man: Heavy Is the Head, in 2012. He told MTV News that Da’ Nic was birthed from that freedom. Although the project is a prelude in his trilogy series that begun with Paperwork (2014) and will continue with his tenth album Dime Trap (2018), it came together more quickly than ever before: "The idea to release an EP came September 2 and we released it on September 11. I could only have done that as an independent artist," he explained.

He also elaborated on his trilogy, breaking it down like this: "Paperwork was the artsy blend of musical tones [incorporating] soulful R&B — a Blueprint–ish approach to an album. Da' Nic and The Dime Trap [will be] unadulterated trap music and [the third album] will be my version of 808s and Heartbreak." On The Dime Trap, Tip plans to link with "young, hungry, talented producers that are making headway in the game" like Metro Boomin, Mike Will Made It, 808 Mafia and Zaytoven.

== Singles ==
On March 11, 2015, TIP released a single titled "Project Steps". The song was produced by TIP's frequent collaborator, Mars of production team 1500 or Nothin'. On June 26, 2015, TIP released the music video for the single "Project Steps". On September 4, 2015, TIP released the EP's second single titled "Check, Run It", as a single via digital distribution. The song was produced by League of Starz. On September 10, 2015, TIP released a song titled "Peanut Butter Jelly", featuring fellow Atlanta-based rappers, Young Dro and Young Thug.

== Track listing ==
No.	Title	Writer(s)	Producer(s)	Length
1.	"Broadcast Live"	Clifford Harris Jr.; Jaswinder Singh	Jazzfeezy; Scena; TNB Beatz	3:53
2.	"Ain't Gonna See It"	Harris Jr.; Shomari Wilson	Shonuff	2:25
3.	"Check, Run It"	Harris Jr.; Donte Blacksher; Regis Bell; Jason Wilkinson	League of Starz	3:57
4.	"Peanut Butter Jelly" (featuring Young Dro and Young Thug)	Harris Jr.; London Holmes; D'Juan Hart; Jeffrey Williams	London on da Track	5:17
5.	"Project Steps"	Harris Jr.; Lamar Edwards	Mars (of 1500 or Nothin')	3:59

== Charts ==
Chart (2015)	Peak position
US Billboard 200	22
US Top R&B/Hip-Hop Albums (Billboard)	3
US Top Rap Albums (Billboard)	2
