= Don't Play That =

2022 single by King Von and 21 Savage

Single by King Von and 21 Savage

from the album What It Means to Be King
- Released: February 4, 2022
- Recorded: 2020
- Genre: Hip hop; drill
- Length: 2:13
- Label: Only the Family; Empire
- Songwriters: Dayvon Bennett; Shayaa Abraham-Joseph; Ahmar Bailey
- Producer: Kid Hazel

King Von singles chronology
"Nobody Move" (2021)	"Don't Play That" (2022)	"War" (2022)

21 Savage singles chronology
"Surround Sound" (2022)	"Don't Play That" (2022)	"Peru (Remix)" (2022)

Music video
- "King Von & 21 Savage - Don't Play That (Official Video)" on YouTube

"Don't Play That" is a song by American rapper King Von and British-American rapper 21 Savage. Written alongside producer Kid Hazel, it was released on February 4, 2022 through Only the Family and Empire Distribution as the second single from Von's second studio album, What It Means to Be King.

== Background ==
In 2020, King Von released his debut album Welcome to O'Block, The album was a commercial success, peaking within the top five on the Billboard 200 and earning a Gold certification. However, Von died shortly after its release, following an altercation in Atlanta.

On February 4, 2022, King Von's first official posthumous single, "Don’t Play That", was released, representing also his first collaboration with 21 Savage. King Von teased the song on October 7, 2020 on Instagram, when the first version contained a guest participation by Key Glock. On April 30, 2021, a demo version of "Don't Play That" leaked online.

== Composition ==
"Don't Play That" is a hard-hitting track produced by Kid Hazel. King Von delivers choppy, bouncy flows, while 21 Savage complements the track with his even-keeled and smooth delivery. The song highlights their distinct styles—Von’s hyperactive storytelling and 21 Savage's deadpan delivery—blended over a sinister instrumental. The lyrics revolve around street life, relationships with women, and Von's experiences with violence. Both rappers trade verses with Von recounting, "She fell in love with a shooter," while 21 echoes similar sentiments, referencing the "gun smoke".

== Music video ==
The animated video for "Don't Play That" was released alongside the single. Directed by Jason Joannes and produced by Cartune, the visual features cartoon versions of Von linking with his crew and his woman as they take a ride through the city and go to the studio. They then connect with 21 and are involved in various street escapades. In the video, they evade the police in a high-speed car chase, and are ultimately cornered at the end of the video. The animation offers a lighthearted and stylized contrast to the darker subject matter of the track, creating a unique dynamic that reflects both artists' personas.

== Critical reception and commercial success ==
Uproxx's Wongo Okon said that "The track serves as another example of Von's straight-to-the-point raps which left little to no room for any fun or games". He also praised 21 Savage's part. It also has received praise for its authenticity and for being a strong posthumous release that honors King Von's legacy, many noted that the track stays true to Von’s gritty, straightforward style.

The song achieved impressive streaming numbers, collecting over 1.4 million Apple Music streams, 1.2 million Spotify streams, and 1.1 million YouTube views within 24 hours of its release, marking Von's most successful single drop to date. The song also reached the position number 40 the Billboard Hot 100 and number 59 on the Billboard Global 200.

== Charts ==
Chart performance for "Don't Play That"
Chart (2022)	Peak position
Canada Hot 100 (Billboard)	45
Global 200 (Billboard)	59
New Zealand Hot Singles (RMNZ)	14
US Billboard Hot 100	40
US Hot R&B/Hip-Hop Songs (Billboard)	11

== Certifications ==
Region	Certification	Certified units/sales
United States (RIAA)	Gold	500,000^{‡}
^{‡} Sales+streaming figures based on certification alone.
