= Us or Else =

EP by T.I.
- Released: September 23, 2016
- Genre: Political hip hop
- Length: 22:24
- Labels: Grand Hustle; Roc Nation
- Producers: Brandon Rossi; Deputy; Lil' C; Mars; Mike & Keys; MP808; Pierre Medor; The Pusha Beats; Trev Case

T.I. chronology
Da' Nic (2015)	Us or Else (2016)	Us or Else: Letter to the System (2016)

Singles from Us or Else
- 1. "We Will Not" Released: August 5, 2016; 2. "Warzone" Released: August 31, 2016

Us or Else is the third extended play (EP) by American rapper T.I. It was released through Tidal on September 23, 2016, by Grand Hustle Records and Roc Nation. The EP features guest appearances from Quavo, Meek Mill, RaRa, Big K.R.I.T. and Killer Mike, as well as production handled by Mars of 1500 or Nothin' and Mike & Keys, among others. The EP serves as the prequel to his long play (LP) record, titled Us or Else: Letter to the System, which was released in December 2016.

== Background ==
On July 22, 2016, during an interview with Ebro in the Morning on Hot 97, T.I. announced an EP, titled Us or Else. The EP was described to "be aimed at supporting the #BlackLivesMatter movement, and will speak explicitly about the twisted road race relations took in America to arrive at its current precarious state." The EP is also in response to the turmoil caused by the injustices going on in America, namely police brutality following the deaths of Philando Castile and Alton Sterling.

T.I. said he was "compelled" to write the EP "after the repeated deaths of unarmed black citizens at the hands of police." T.I. has said that he is "late to the party" when it comes to what he calls "revolutionary art": "You know Common and Outkast and Public Enemy and KRS-One and Lupe [Fiasco] and Kendrick [Lamar] -- those are the ones. I am just the supporting cast in this particular genre. I felt like more people who stand in my position should be saying something. It seems like the people who have the broad audiences ... I guess for protection of their own success or legacy or brand, they chose not to say anything, and that it was I felt I didn't want to do."

== Release and promotion ==
On July 5, 2016, Grand Hustle's resident disc jockey DJ MLK, released a song, titled "40 Acres" featuring T.I., RaRa and Rossi. On August 5, 2016, T.I. released the EP's first single, titled "We Will Not". The song was produced by his frequent collaborator Mars from the production team 1500 or Nothin'. On August 19, 2016, T.I. released the music video for "We Will Not". On August 31, 2016, T.I. released the EP's second single, titled "Warzone", with an accompanying music video one week later, exclusively through TIDAL. The music video for "Warzone", produced by Antwanette McLaughlin and directed by Laurel Richardson, "imagines what it would look like if everyday white people were targeted by police. Taking that scenario one step further, we see reenactments of the murders of Tamir Rice (a 12-year-old killed by police, while playing with a toy gun in Cleveland), Eric Garner (who died after being placed in an apparent chokehold by NYC policemen) and Philando Castile (shot and killed by a St. Paul, Minnesota police officer during a traffic stop), with white actors in the victims's places. Footage of T.I. rapping the song's Black Lives Matter–inspired 'Hands up / Can't breathe" chorus is interspersed throughout." T.I. has said the video is in response to the "All Lives Matter" slogan: "We wanted to give 'the other side' -- and when I say the 'other side' I don't mean police, I don't mean white people, I mean people who think we're just overreacting, the 'All Lives Matter' people -- we wanted to give them the least amount of ammunition to oppose our message. And the way to do that, we thought, was to go with the most atrocious of all of the travesties. And don't get me wrong, there are still more that are equally atrocious, but for the purposes of our video ... those were the ones that seemed most effective." On September 30, 2016, the album was released via other digital distribution platforms such as Amazon and iTunes. In October 2016, T.I. performed "We Will Not" at the 2016 BET Hip Hop Awards, where he dressed as a member of the Black Panther Party and was surrounded by "Black Lives Matter" signs.

== Critical reception ==
Professional ratings
Review scores
Source	Rating
AllMusic	4/5 stars
DJBooth	(3-star Honorable Mention)
HipHopDX	4.5/5
The Star	4/5 stars
Vice	(3-star Honorable Mention)

Us or Else received generally favorable reviews from music critics. Aaron McKrell of HipHopDX wrote, "It's [the] conviction that keeps the EP from being just a collection of obligatory anthems. When Clifford Harris flirts with being self-righteous, it's his self-awareness that keeps him grounded. Us or Else is a commanding assortment of protest tunes strengthened by the passion of its composer." In Vice, Robert Christgau named "40 Acres" and "Black Man" the EP's highlights and wrote, "Intelligent black man goes straight conscious while wisely ceding the EP's most intelligent rhyme to Killer Mike".

== Track listing ==
Us or Else — Standard edition
No.	Title	Writer(s)	Producer(s)	Length
1.	"We Will Not"	Clifford Harris Jr.; Lamar Edwards; Michael Cox Jr.; John Groover Jr.	Mars; Mike & Keys	2:50
2.	"Black Man" (featuring Quavo, Meek Mill and RaRa)	C. Harris Jr.; Quavious Marshall; Robert Williams; Cordale Quinn; Terrell McNeal; Edwards; Brandon Rossi; Rodriguez Smith	Lil' C; MP808; Mars; Rossi	4:42
3.	"Warzone"	C. Harris Jr.; Cox Jr.; Groover Jr.; Edwards	Mike & Keys; Mars	3:44
4.	"Switchin' Lanes" (featuring Big K.R.I.T. and Trev Case)	C. Harris Jr.; Justin Scott	Trev Case	4:10
5.	"40 Acres" (featuring Killer Mike and B. Rossi)	C. Harris Jr.; Michael Render; Rossi; Jamil Pierre; Pierre Medor	Deputy; Medor	3:52
6.	"I Swear"	C. Harris Jr.	The Pusha Beats	3:03
Total length:				22:24

== Charts ==
Chart (2016)	Peak position
US Billboard 200	175
US Top R&B/Hip-Hop Albums (Billboard)	12
