= Robberies (song) =

Single by King Von

from the album Grandson
- Released: June 23, 2023
- Genre: Hip hop; drill
- Length: 2:08
- Label: Only the Family; Empire
- Songwriter: Dayvon Bennett
- Producer: ATL Jacob

King Von singles chronology
"War" (2022)	"Robberies" (2023)	"Heartless" (2023)

Music video
- Music video on YouTube

"Robberies" is a song by American rapper King Von. It was released on June 23, 2023, as the lead single from his third studio album Grandson, which was released on July 14, 2023.

== Announcement ==
The release was announced with a post on King Von's official Instagram page on June 20, 2023.

== Music video ==
The music video for the song was released few hours later on the same date, on King Von's official YouTube channel. It is centered around a group of friends from Chicago that robs some drug dealers who will have revenge, unleashing at the same time, a circle of vengeance.

== Charts ==
Chart performance for "Robberies"
Chart (2023)	Peak position
New Zealand Hot Singles (RMNZ)	20
