= Grandson (album) =

Studio album by King Von
- Released: July 14, 2023
- Genres: Hip-hop; drill; gangsta rap
- Length: 45:56
- Labels: Only the Family; Empire
- Producers: ATL Jacob; Chopsquad DJ; David Morse; DJ Bandz; Ghostrage; IllaDaProducer; Mac Fly; Raw Equity; Scott Storch; Southside; Tahj Money; Twysted Genius; Wheezy

King Von chronology
| What It Means to Be King (2022) | Grandson (2023) |

Singles from Grandson
- 1. "Robberies" Released: June 23, 2023; 2. "Heartless" Released: July 7, 2023; 3. "Don't Miss" Released: July 14, 2023

Professional ratings
Review scores
| Source | Rating |
|---|---|
| RapReviews | 7.5/10 |
| Allmusic | 3.5/5 stars |
| HipHopDx | 3.5/5 stars |

Grandson is the third studio album by American rapper King Von, and his second posthumous work, following the previous year's What It Means to Be King. It was released through labels Only the Family Entertainment/Empire on July 14, 2023. The production on the album was handled by various producers including ATL Jacob, Chopsquad DJ, David Morse, DJ Bandz, Ghostrage, IllaDaProducer, Mac Fly, Raw Equity, Scott Storch, Southside, Tahj Money, Twysted Genius, Wheezy; most of which had already collaborated with Bennett on previous albums. It features guest appearances from G Herbo, Polo G, Lil Durk, Tee Grizzley, BreezyLyn, Tink, 42 Dugg, Moneybagg Yo, and Hotboii.

Grandson was supported by three singles: "Robberies", "Heartless" which features Tee Grizzley, and "Don't Miss".

== Announcement ==
In January 2023, Von's manager teased, with a post on his official page, that another LP could have been on the way for later that year. This news was excitedly welcomed among fans after the warm reception to 2022's What It Means to Be King project.

The release was announced with a post on King Von's official Instagram page on June 30, 2023. The name of the album is Grandson that pays homage to Von's first mixtape, Grandson, Vol. 1, and it is a reference to his notorious nickname. This project was carried out by the rapper's closest collaborators and by his mother herself. On July 7, the tracklist was revealed with a post on his Instagram page, revealing 17 tracks, and the album's guest appearances.

== Release and promotion ==
The lead single of the album "Robberies" was announced on June 20, 2023, and released three days later, followed by the release of an associated music videos some hours later. The album's second single was "Heartless" featuring Tee Grizzley, and was released on July 7, 2023, on all streaming platform and including an official visualizer on YouTube, barely a week prior to the release of the complete album. The last single, named "Don't Miss, was released with an official video in conjunction with the album's release on July 14, 2023; in the same video Bennett appears in first person.

The tracklist of the album was revealed through a Billboard that was set up in New York City on July 7, 2023, just a week before the official releasing. The Billboard consisted of a large display panel, of which a picture was subsequently published on both King Von's official Instagram page and Spotify's, which also sponsored the advertisement.

== Commercial performance ==
The day after the album release date, on July 15, Grandson went first on Apple Music charts section: "All Genres".

Grandson went 14th on the Billboard 200, 2nd on the Billboard Independent Albums and 4th on the Billboard Top R&B/Hip Hop Albums, also went on number 31 for Billboard top 100 Canada and number 20 on the New Zealand top 40.

== Cover ==
The cover shows King Von's son Dayvon Bennett Jr, to depict a Von as a child, having the same colored dreadlocks and having the same dress style with denim jeans, chains as OTF and O-Block pendants, and a fitted with his fathers alias V. Roy embroidered on the back.

== Track listing ==
Grandson track listing
| No. | Title | Writer(s) | Producer(s) | Length |
|---|---|---|---|---|
| 1. | "Don't Miss" | Dayvon Bennett; Jacob Canady; Paul Williams | ATL Jacob; Mac Fly | 2:02 |
| 2. | "Real Oppy" (featuring G Herbo) | Bennett; Herbert Wright III; Chandler Ingram; Tahj Vaughn | Ghostrage; Tahj Money | 2:42 |
| 3. | "HitMan" | Bennett; Darrel Jackson | Chopsquad DJ | 1:58 |
| 4. | "Phil Jackson" (with Polo G) | Bennett; Taurus Bartlett; Scott Storch; Ray Fraser | Storch; IllaDaProducer | 2:48 |
| 5. | "Robberies" | Bennett; Canady | ATL Jacob | 2:08 |
| 6. | "From the Hood" (with Lil Durk) | Bennett; Durk Banks; Jackson | Chopsquad DJ | 3:24 |
| 7. | "Pressure" | Bennett; Jackson; Deundraeus Portis | Chopsquad DJ; Twysted Genius | 2:52 |
| 8. | "Jimmy" | Bennett; David Morse; Vaughn | Morse; Tahj Money | 2:12 |
| 9. | "Heartless" (with Tee Grizzley) | Bennett; Terry Wallace Jr.; Jackson | DJ Bandz; Chopsquad DJ | 2:46 |
| 10. | "Jealous" (with BreezyLyn and Tink) | Bennett; Breonica Smith; Trinity Home; Wesley Glass | Wheezy | 4:10 |
| 11. | "Act Up" | Bennett; Jackson | Chopsquad DJ | 2:40 |
| 12. | "Think I'm a Hoe" | Bennett; Jackson | Chopsquad DJ | 2:11 |
| 13. | "All We Do Is Drill" | Bennett; Jackson | Chopsquad DJ | 2:45 |
| 14. | "GangLand" (featuring 42 Dugg) | Bennett; Dion Hayes; Joshua Luellen | Southside | 2:57 |
| 15. | "Out of the Streets" (featuring Moneybagg Yo and Hotboii) | Bennett; DeMario White Jr.; Javarri Walker; Jackson | Chopsquad DJ | 3:47 |
| 16. | "When I Die" | Bennett; Jackson | Chopsquad DJ | 2:08 |
| 17. | "Family Dedication 2" | Bennett; Raw Equity | Raw Equity | 2:27 |
| Total length: | | | | 45:56 |

== Charts ==
Chart performance for Grandson
| Chart (2023) | Peak position |
|---|---|
| Canadian Albums (Billboard) | 31 |
| New Zealand Albums (RMNZ) | 30 |
| US Billboard 200 | 14 |
| US Independent Albums (Billboard) | 2 |
| US Top R&B/Hip-Hop Albums (Billboard) | 1 |
