= War (King Von song) =

2022 single by King Von

Single by King Von

from the album What It Means to Be King
- Released: March 2, 2022
- Genre: Hip hop; drill
- Length: 2:40
- Label: Only the Family; Empire
- Songwriters: Dayvon Bennett; Darrel Jackson
- Producer: Chopsquad DJ

King Von singles chronology
"Don't Play That" (2022)	"War" (2022)	"Robberies" (2023)

Music video
- "King Von - War (Official Lyric Video)" on YouTube

"War" is a posthumously released song by American rapper King Von, released on March 2, 2022, through Only the Family and Empire Distribution, as the third single from his second studio album What It Means to Be King (2022). The song was produced by Chopsquad DJ.

== Background ==
King Von previewed the song in 2020 on Instagram Live, before his passing later that year. The song gained traction via the social platform TikTok as well. It was posthumously released on March 2, 2022.

"War" is the third single revealed from What It Means To Be King, following the 21 Savage-assisted track "Don't Play That", which debuted in February 2022. The release of "War" came just days after Von’s estate shared the album’s cover art, which features Von’s intense gaze and handwritten title, reminiscent of the aesthetic used for his debut album Welcome to O'Block.

== Composition ==
"War" is a hard-hitting, street-oriented track that showcases King Von's signature raw and menacing storytelling. Produced by Chopsquad DJ, the song delivers a dark, ominous beat layered with a piano and led with 808s that matches with Von’s vivid tales of street life and with his emotional delivery and powerful lyricism. In the lyrics, Von reflects on the violence he has faced and the choices he has made to protect himself. The chorus captures the grim realities of his upbringing: "War outside, niggas couldn’t even eat / I was 16 with a Carbon 15 / Motherfuckers gotta die and it ain’t gon’ be me." Von's delivery remains defiant as he recounts his experiences, likening his bullets to a fast Bugatti and referencing WWE wrestler Scotty 2 Hotty to emphasize the intensity of his violent encounters. The track also touches on Von's inner conflict, as he oscillates between glorifying violence and recognizing its toll on his life and psyche.

== Critical reception ==
The release of "War" has been met with widespread acclaim, also confirmed by the fact that it reached the position number 73 on the Billboard Hot 100 and number 195 on the Billboard Global 200. Jon Powell of Revolt praised the track for its "no-frills, street-oriented subject matter" and the chilling way in which Von’s storytelling remains as potent as ever. Michael Saponara from HipHopDX emphasized the song's menacing tone and praised its vivid imagery, noting that Von's lyricism is filled with "sinister, yet introspective bars" that leave a lasting impact. Mackenzie Cummings-Grady of Complex similarly highlighted the track's powerful and haunting nature, calling it a grim anthem for the late rapper’s fans and a continuation of his cemented reputation in the drill scene.

== Charts ==
Chart (2022)	Peak position
Global 200 (Billboard)	195
US Billboard Hot 100	73
US Hot R&B/Hip-Hop Songs (Billboard)	23
