= Heartless (King Von song) =

Single by King Von

from the album Grandson
- Released: July 7, 2023
- Genre: Hip hop; drill
- Length: 2:46
- Label: Only the Family; Empire
- Songwriter(s): Dayvon Bennett™; Terry Sanchez Wallace Jr.
- Producer(s): Chopsquad DJ

King Von singles chronology
"Robberies" (2023)	"Heartless" (2023)	"Don't Miss" (2023)

Music video
- "King Von - Heartless (Official Visualizer)(feat. Tee Grizzly)" on YouTube

"Heartless" is a song by American rapper King Von featuring American rapper Tee Grizzley. It was released on July 7, 2023, as the second single extracted from his third studio album Grandson, which was released on July 14, 2023.

== Release ==
The song has been released on all platforms after being announced a few hours earlier on King Von's social media pages.

The song was published also on YouTube, where it includes a visualizer.

== Charts ==
Chart performance for "Heartless"
Chart (2023)	Peak position
New Zealand Hot Singles (RMNZ)	35
