= Us or Else: Letter to the System =

Compilation album by T.I.
- Released: December 16, 2016
- Recorded: 2016
- Genre: Political hip-hop
- Length: 57:01
- Labels: Grand Hustle; Roc Nation
- Producers: Brandon Rossi; Deputy; KD; Lil' C; Mars; Mike & Keys; MP808; Nottz; Shantiseng; Steven Franks; TBHits; The Pusha Beats; The Digital Natives; The-Dream; Trev Case

T.I. chronology
Us or Else (2016)	Us or Else: Letter to the System (2016)	Dime Trap (2018)

Us or Else: Letter to the System is a compilation album by the American rapper T.I. It was independently released on December 16, 2016, by Grand Hustle Records and Roc Nation. The project, which was initially issued as a Tidal exclusive, is an extended version of his EP, simply titled Us or Else (2016).

The project features an array of artists, including Hustle Gang affiliates Quavo, Meek Mill, Ra Ra, Gizzle, Tokyo Jetz, B.o.B, London Jae, Big K.R.I.T., Killer Mike and Charlie Wilson. The project's production was by The Digital Natives, The-Dream, Lil' C, Mars, Mike & Keys, MP808, Nottz, TBHits, Trev Case and others.

== Background ==
You know Common and Outkast and Public Enemy and KRS-One and Lupe [Fiasco] and Kendrick [Lamar] -- those are the ones. I am just the supporting cast in this particular genre. I felt like more people who stand in my position should be saying something. It seems like the people who have the broad audiences... I guess for protection of their own success or legacy or brand, they chose not to say anything, and that it was I felt I didn't want to do.

— NBC News

On February 22, 2016, T.I. announced that he had signed a distribution deal with Jay Z's Roc Nation company. He also revealed that he was one of the new co-owners of the online streaming service, Tidal. On July 22, 2016, during an interview with Ebro in the Morning on Hot 97, he announced an EP, titled Us or Else. The EP was said to "be aimed at supporting the Black Lives Matter movement, and will speak explicitly about the twisted road race relations took in America to arrive at its current precarious state." The EP was also a response to the turmoil caused by the injustices going on in America, namely police brutality following the deaths of Philando Castile and Alton Sterling. The EP was released for streaming on September 23, 2016, by Tidal, and released to other markets on September 30. On December 16, 2016, without prior announcement or promotion, T.I. released Us or Else: Letter to the System.

== Critical reception ==
Professional ratings
Review scores
Source	Rating
HipHopDX	4.3/5
Pitchfork	7/10
Spinditty	7/10
Vice (Expert Witness)	(A−)

The compilation received generally positive reviews from music critics and fans alike. Da'Shan Smith of Pitchfork wrote, "The bevy of showcasing guest appearances — from Jacksonville-based Tokyo Jetz's annihilating turn on "Lazy" to fellow Atlantian London Jae's raspy flow on the backwoods baptism of "Pain" — embody two core principles of BLM: community and the advancement of future generations. With his generosity, the self-proclaimed "Grand Hustler" is repositioning himself in the vein of someone like Dr. Dre, who in 2015 introduced the wider world to Anderson .Paak on Compton." Aaron McKrell of HipHopDX wrote, "Us or Else: Letter to the System equates in not only one of the year's strongest full-length projects but in Tip's discography as well. It's a suitable blend of his personal views to package aware commentary of our turbulent times in the United States in 2016."

== Track listing ==
Standard edition
No.	Title	Writer(s)	Producer(s)	Length
1.	"I Believe"	Clifford Harris Jr.; Dominick Lamb	Nottz	3:44
2.	"Ah No No" (featuring Translee)	Harris Jr.; Kevin Davis; Translee Macklin	BeatsxKD	3:57
3.	"Black Man" (featuring Quavo, Meek Mill and Ra Ra)	Harris Jr.; Quavious Marshall; Robert Williams; Cordale Quinn; Terrell McNeal; Lamar Edwards; Brandon Rossi; Rodriguez Smith	Lil' C; MP808; Mars; Rossi	4:42
4.	"Lazy" (featuring Gizzle, Tokyo Jetz, Ra Ra and London Jae)	Harris Jr.; Glenda Proby; Shauntrell Pender; Smith; Jacquez Lowe; Quinn	Lil' C; Shantiseng	4:41
5.	"Warzone"	Harris Jr.; Michael Cox Jr.; John Groover Jr.; Edwards	Mike & Keys; Mars	3:52
6.	"Writer" (featuring Translee and B.o.B)	Harris Jr.; Macklin; Bobby Ray Simmons Jr.	The Digital Natives	4:06
7.	"Letter to the System" (featuring London Jae and Translee)	Harris Jr.; Lowe; Macklin	The Digital Natives	2:48
8.	"We Will Not"	Harris Jr.; Cox Jr.; Groover Jr.; Edwards	Mike & Keys; Mars	2:38
9.	"Pain" (featuring London Jae)	Harris Jr.; Lowe; Lamb	Nottz	4:06
10.	"Switchin' Lanes" (featuring Big K.R.I.T. and Trev Case)	Harris Jr.; Justin Scott; Trevor Case; Derek Blythe	Trev Case	4:10
11.	"Picture Me Mobbin'" (featuring The-Dream)	Harris Jr.; Terius Nash	The-Dream	3:42
12.	"40 Acres" (featuring Killer Mike and B. Rossi)	Harris Jr.; Michael Render; Rossi; Jamil Pierre	Deputy	3:52
13.	"I Swear"	Harris Jr.; Arthur Ross; Leon Ware	The Pusha Beats	3:03
14.	"Here We Go / Don't Fall for That" (featuring Charlie Wilson)	Harris Jr.; Mitchelle'l Sium; Charlie Wilson; Quinn	Lil' C	3:57
15.	"Take da Wheel"	Harris Jr.; Tommy Brown; Steven Franks	TBHits; Franks	3:42
Total length:				57:01

== Personnel ==
Credits for Us or Else: Letter to the System adapted from AllMusic.

- Big K.R.I.T. – featured artist
- Derek Blythe – composer
- B.o.B – featured artist
- Trev Case – featured artist
- Trevor Case – composer
- Michael Cox – composer
- The-Dream – featured artist
- Lamar Edwards – composer
- John Groover – composer
- Clifford Harris – composer
- London Jae – featured artist
- Tokyo Jetz – featured artist
- Killer Mike – featured artist
- Gizzle – featured artist
- Jacquez Lowe – composer
- Translee Macklin – composer
- Quavious Marshall – composer
- Meek Mill – featured artist
- Terius Nash – composer
- Shauntrell Pender – composer
- Glenda Proby – composer
- Quavo – featured artist
- Ra Ra – featured artist
- Michael Render – composer
- Arthur Ross – composer
- B Rossi – featured artist
- Brandon Rossi – composer
- Justin Scott – composer
- Bobby Simmons – composer
- Mitchelle'l Sium – composer
- Rodriqueiz Smith – composer
- T.I. – primary artist
- Jayceon Taylor – composer
- Translee – featured artist
- Leon Ware – composer
- Robert Williams – composer
- Charlie Wilson – composer, featured artist

== Charts ==
Chart (2016)	Peak position
US Top R&B/Hip-Hop Albums (Billboard)	39

== Release history ==
List of release dates, formats, label, and reference
Region	Date	Format	Label	Ref.
Various	December 16, 2016	Streaming (Tidal exclusive)	Grand Hustle; Roc Nation	
Various	December 23, 2016	Streaming; Digital download	Grand Hustle; Roc Nation	
