= Elements (B.o.B album) =

2016 album by B.o.B

Compilation album by B.o.B
- Released: November 4, 2016
- Genre: Conscious hip-hop
- Length: 158:31
- Label: No Genre

B.o.B chronology
Psycadelik Thoughtz (2015)	Elements (2016)	Ether (2017)

Elements is a compilation album by American rapper B.o.B, released on November 4, 2016, by his independent label Label No Genre. It is composed of his 2015 and 2016 conscious mixtapes WATER, FIRE, EARTH and AIR, where he comments on society, politics and conspiracy theories. The compilation was released as a prelude to his fourth album and the fifth installment in the Elements series, Ether.

On October 21, 2021, the compilation was re-released in a vinyl version.

== Charts ==
Chart (2016)	Peak position
US Independent Albums (Billboard)	10
US Top R&B/Hip-Hop Albums (Billboard)	18
US Top Rap Albums (Billboard)	10

== WATER ==
WATER

Mixtape by B.o.B
- Released: December 4, 2015
- Recorded: 2015
- Genres: Conscious hip-hop; trap
- Length: 35:59
- Label: No Genre
- Producer: B.o.B

WATER (We Are The Enemy Really) is a mixtape by American recording artist B.o.B. The project was produced entirely by B.o.B himself, and released on December 4, 2015, by No Genre. The tracks "Cold Bwoy (Freestyle)", "Purple Mountain" and "Blank Mafia" from the mixtape were released with their music videos.

=== Music and lyrics ===
In the mixtape the rapper raps mainly over trap productions, and lyrics about corruption and dangers of the government.

=== Track listing ===
No.	Title	Length
1.	"Born to Die"	3:28
2.	"Cold Bwoy (Freestyle)"	3:34
3.	"The Crazies!!!"	4:10
4.	"Blank Mafia"	3:39
5.	"Uncomfortable"	3:32
6.	"Hurt"	3:56
7.	"Behind Ya Back / Purple Mountain"	5:36
8.	"Cut Throat"	8:00
Total length:		35:59

== FIRE ==
FIRE

Mixtape by B.o.B
- Released: January 18, 2016
- Recorded: 2015–16
- Genres: Conscious hip-hop; alternative hip-hop
- Length: 37:35
- Label: No Genre
- Producer: B.o.B

FIRE (False Idols Ruin Egos) is a mixtape by American recording artist B.o.B. The project was produced entirely by B.o.B himself, and released on January 18, 2016, by No Genre.

The tracks "Bend Over", "Excuse Me" and "Summers Day" from the mixtape were released with their music videos.

=== Music and lyrics ===
The mixtape has productions with various influences of funk, jazz, soul and electronic, and opens with news and other audio clips about drug deaths and other tragic occurrences, hinting that the emcee wants to get to the bottom of what's happening to hip-hop and politics. Throughout the tape, B.o.B. seems disillusioned with the state of hip-hop.

=== Track listing ===
No.	Title	Length
1.	"Bend Over"	4:58
2.	"Excuse Me"	2:53
3.	"Mr. Mister"	3:04
4.	"Summers Day"	3:45
5.	"False Flag"	4:03
6.	"King Tut"	3:02
7.	"Lights Out"	3:40
8.	"Shhh"	3:10
9.	"Action News"	9:00
Total length:		37:35

== EARTH ==
EARTH

Mixtape by B.o.B
- Released: April 22, 2016
- Recorded: 2016
- Genre: Conscious hip-hop
- Length: 44:40
- Label: No Genre
- Producer: B.o.B

EARTH (Educational Avatar Reality Training Habitat) is a mixtape by American recording artist B.o.B. The project was produced entirely by B.o.B himself, and was released on April 22, 2016, on Earth Day, by No Genre.

The tracks "Earthquake" and "$tacks of Dreams" from the mixtape were released with their music videos.

=== Music and lyrics ===
The main themes of the mixtape are B.o.B's belief that the earth is flat and conspiracy theories. The mixtape contains samples of speeches by scientists, pundits, conspiracy theorists, and Barack Obama, and spans also controversial topics like astral projection and cloning.

The track "Flatline Pt.2" is an extended and revisited version of his song "Flatline", released on his SoundCloud account in January 2016.

=== Track listing ===
No.	Title	Length
1.	"Under the Dome"	5:08
2.	"$tacks of Dreams"	3:11
3.	"Fck' Science Bro"	4:00
4.	"Dumb"	3:53
5.	"H.A.A.R.P Music"	3:17
6.	"PoW WoW"	3:36
7.	"Break the Rules"	3:15
8.	"They Live"	3:00
9.	"Earthquake"	5:20
10.	"Flatline Pt.2"	10:00
Total length:		44:40

== AIR ==
AIR

Mixtape by B.o.B
- Released: August 29, 2016
- Recorded: 2016
- Genres: Conscious hip-hop; alternative hip-hop
- Length: 44:17
- Label: No Genre
- Producer: B.o.B

AIR (Art Imitates Reality) is a mixtape by American recording artist B.o.B. The project is entirely self-produced, and it was released on August 29, 2016, by No Genre.

The tracks "Escape", "War Witch" and "Air Bender" from the mixtape were released with their music videos.

=== Music and lyrics ===
The mixtape is based on gospel-esque productions influenced by trap, and lyrics where the rapper talks about the ruling class and their propaganda and illicit yet obvious institutions.

=== Track listing ===
No.	Title	Length
1.	"Fingerprint"	3:06
2.	"Air Bender"	2:54
3.	"Negative Space"	3:10
4.	"Mercy Me"	4:25
5.	"Masters of War"	2:25
6.	"Yung'n"	4:34
7.	"Bobby Neutron"	3:09
8.	"Stanley Kubrick"	3:36
9.	"War Witch"	3:27
10.	"Vultures"	2:31
11.	"Escape"	11:00
Total length:		44:17
