= The Human Condition (Jon Bellion album) =

Studio album by Jon Bellion
- Released: June 10, 2016
- Recorded: 2014–16
- Genres: Pop; R&B; hip hop
- Length: 55:11
- Labels: Visionary; Capitol
- Producers: Jon Bellion; Stephan Moccio; Mark Williams; Raul Cubina

Jon Bellion chronology
The Definition (2014)	The Human Condition (2016)	Glory Sound Prep (2018)

Singles from The Human Condition
- 1. "All Time Low" Released: May 13, 2016; 2. "Overwhelming" Released: April 25, 2017

The Human Condition is the debut studio album by American singer-songwriter Jon Bellion. The album was released on June 10, 2016, through Visionary Music Group and Capitol Records.

It was supported by four promotional singles: "Guillotine", "All Time Low", "80's Films", and "Maybe IDK". "All Time Low" was later announced as the lead single from the album and was released on May 13, 2016. Bellion released early versions of "All Time Low" and "Woke the Fuck Up" in 2015 along with the song "Woodstock (Psychedelic Fiction)", which was not featured on the record. "Overwhelming" was released as a single on April 25, 2017.

== Artwork ==
The cover art for The Human Condition was created by David Ardinaryas Lojaya and Jacob Caljouw. Additionally, Lojaya and Caljouw created artwork for each of the tracks on the album. The recurrent themes throughout the fourteen pieces are "...young Jon, current Jon, and the old Jon [as well as] a woman who is throughout all the things, and she should be muse..".

== Singles ==
"Guillotine", "80's Films", and "Maybe IDK" were released as promotional singles in early 2016.

"All Time Low" was released to digital retailers initially in 2015 alongside “Woke The F*ck Up”, with an updated mix being released on May 13, 2016, and later to Top 40 radio on August 30, 2016, as the lead single from the album.

"Overwhelming" was announced to be the second official single from the album, and was released to Top 40 radio on April 25, 2017.

== Track listing ==
No.	Title	Writer(s)	Producer(s)	Length
1.	"He Is the Same"	Jonathan Bellion; Mark Williams; Raul Cubina	Bellion; Williams; Volta; Mylon Hayde^{[a]}	4:01
2.	"80's Films"	Bellion; Williams; Michael Busbee	Bellion; busbee; Williams; Ross Golan^{[a]}	3:36
3.	"All Time Low"	Bellion; Travis Mendes; Williams; Cubina	Bellion; Williams^{[a]}; Volta^{[a]}	3:37
4.	"New York Soul (Part II)"	Bellion; Williams; Hayde; Alec Benjamin; Steven Haworth Miller	Bellion; Williams; Hayde; Volta^{[a]}	4:27
5.	"Fashion"	Bellion; Stephan Moccio	Moccio	3:55
6.	"Maybe IDK"	Bellion; Williams; Cubina; Busbee; Fraser T. Smith	Bellion; Smith; Williams; Volta; busbee^{[a]}	3:53
7.	"Woke the Fuck Up"	Bellion; Rob Knox; Williams; Hayde	Bellion; Knox; Williams^{[a]}; Hayde^{[a]}	3:39
8.	"Overwhelming"	Bellion; Williams; Cubina; Jonathan Simpson	Bellion; Williams; Simpson^{[a]}; Volta^{[a]}	2:52
9.	"Weight of the World" (featuring Blaque Keyz)	Bellion; Chris DeStefano; Williams; Ramon Ibanga Jr	Bellion; DeStefano; Illmind; Williams^{[a]}; Volta^{[a]}	4:29
10.	"The Good in Me"	Bellion; Williams; Kimberly Perry	Bellion; Williams^{[a]}; Volta^{[a]}	3:43
11.	"Morning in America"	Jason Evigan; Sean Douglas; Sam Martin; Ian Kirkpatrick; Bellion	Kirkpatrick; Evigan; Bellion; Williams^{[a]}; Volta^{[a]}	4:25
12.	"iRobot"	Bellion; Williams; Hayde	Bellion; Hayde; Williams	3:28
13.	"Guillotine" (featuring Travis Mendes)	Bellion; Williams; Cubina; Mendes	Bellion; Williams; Volta	3:28
14.	"Hand of God"	Bellion; Dan Heath; Williams; Cubina	Bellion; Heath; Williams^{[a]}; Volta^{[a]}	5:37
Total length:				55:11

Notes

- ^{^[a]} signifies an additional (non-primary) producer
- "New York Soul (Part II)" contains uncredited vocals by Alec Benjamin.
- The word “fuck” in the title of “Woke the Fuck Up” is censored as “f*ck” on digital editions of the album.

== Personnel ==
Musicians

- Jon Bellion – vocals (all tracks), background vocals (track 1), drum programming (1, 2, 6, 8, 10, 12, 13), keyboards (1, 3, 8–10, 12–14)
- Mark Williams – drum programming (1, 6, 12, 14), keyboards (1, 2, 6, 9, 11–14), acoustic guitar (2, 13, 14), electric guitar (2, 4, 14), bass guitar (8, 13), piano (8)
- Audra Mae – background vocals (1)
- Travis Mendes – background vocals (1, 3, 13, 14)
- Alec Benjamin – background vocals (4)
- Mylon Hayde – drum programming (4, 12), keyboards (4)
- Paul Bushnell – bass guitar (5)
- Vanessa Freebairn-Smith – cello (5)
- Jay Paul Bicknell – drum programming (5)
- Stephan Moccio – keyboards, piano (5)
- Fraser T. Smith – acoustic guitar, keyboards (6)
- Raul Cubina – drum programming (6, 12)
- Chris DeStefano – acoustic guitar, vocals (9)
- Illmind – drum programming, keyboards (9)
- Hakim Hardy – vocals (9)
- Kimberly Perry – background vocals (10)
- Samuel Martin – background vocals (11)
- Sean Douglas – background vocals (11)
- Ian Kirkpatrick – guitar, keyboards (11)
- Jason Evigan – guitar, keyboards (11)
- Alfie Silas Durio – additional vocals (14)
- Alvin Chea – additional vocals (14)
- Anjolee Williams – additional vocals (14)
- Annette Mata – additional vocals (14)
- Bill Cantos – additional vocals (14)
- Carmel Echols – additional vocals (14)
- Eyvonne Williams – additional vocals (14)
- Jamie McCrary – additional vocals (14)
- Jason Morales – additional vocals (14)
- Kurt Lykes – additional vocals (14)
- Linda McCrary – additional vocals (14)
- Lisa Stone – additional vocals (14)
- Melodye Perry – additional vocals (14)
- Michiko Hill – additional vocals (14)
- Pattie Howard – additional vocals (14)
- Perry Morgan – additional vocals (14)
- Rick Nelson – additional vocals (14)
- Sam McCrary – additional vocals (14)
- Terri Ivens – additional vocals (14)
- Voncile Faggett – additional vocals (14)

Technical

- Manny Marroquin – mixing (1, 6, 8–14)
- Mark Williams – mixing (2–4, 7), engineering (1, 2, 4, 8–10, 12, 13), mixing assistance (14)
- Volta – mixing (2–4), mixing assistance (14)
- Sean Tallman – mixing (5)
- Jon Bellion – mixing (7), engineering (1–4, 7–10, 12–14)
- Raul Cubina – engineering (1, 8–10, 12, 13)
- Mylon Hayde – engineering (4)
- Jay Paul Bicknell – engineering (5)
- Fraser T. Smith – engineering (6)
- Matthew Emonson – engineering (6)
- Jonathan Simpson – engineering (8)
- Bradford Smith – engineering (11)
- Chandler Harrod – engineering (14)
- Chris Galland – mixing assistance (1, 6, 8–14)
- Ike Shultz – mixing assistance (1, 6, 8–14)
- Jon Schacter – engineering assistance (11)

== The Human Condition Tour ==
On April 27, 2016, two days after the album was announced, Bellion revealed the dates of Part 1 of The Human Condition Tour. Later, Bellion revealed Part 2 and the European Leg on July 26, 2016 and September 29, 2016, respectively.

Date	City	Country	Venue
Part One
June 20, 2016	Boston	United States	Royale
June 21, 2016	Philadelphia	United States	Trocadero Theatre
June 22, 2016	Cleveland	United States	House of Blues
June 24, 2016	Washington D.C.	United States	9:30 Club
June 25, 2016	Nashville	United States	Exit/In
June 26, 2016	Atlanta	United States	The Loft
June 28, 2016	Ft. Lauderdale	United States	Culture Room
June 29, 2016	Orlando	United States	The Beacham
July 1, 2016	Houston	United States	House of Blues
July 2, 2016	Dallas	United States	House of Blues
July 3, 2016	Albuquerque	United States	Sunshine Theater
July 5, 2016	Tucson	United States	The Rock
July 6, 2016	Phoenix	United States	Crescent Ballroom
July 8, 2016	Los Angeles	United States	The Fonda Theatre
July 9, 2016	San Diego	United States	House of Blues
July 11, 2016	San Francisco	United States	The Fillmore
July 13, 2016	Seattle	United States	Neptune Theatre (Seattle)
July 14, 2016	Portland	United States	Wonder Ballroom
July 18, 2016	Salt Lake City	United States	The Complex
July 19, 2016	Denver	United States	Gothic Theatre
July 21, 2016	Minneapolis	United States	Varsity Theater
July 22, 2016	Milwaukee	United States	The Rave/Eagles Club
July 23, 2016	Chicago	United States	House of Blues
July 24, 2016	Detroit	United States	Saint Andrew's Hall, Detroit
July 26, 2016	Toronto	Canada	The Hoxton
July 27, 2016	Pittsburgh	United States	Altar Bar
July 29, 2016	New York City	United States	Webster Hall
Part Two
October 20, 2016	Columbus	United States	Newport Music Hall
October 23, 2016	Indianapolis	United States	Deluxe
October 25, 2016	Detroit	United States	Fillmoare
October 27, 2016	Toronto	Canada	Phoenix
October 28, 2016	Chicago	United States	Riviera Theatre
October 30, 2016	Minneapolis	United States	Myth
October 31, 2016	Lawrence	United States	Granada
November 2, 2016	Salt Lake City	United States	The Complex
November 3, 2016	Los Angeles	United States	The Wiltern
November 4, 2016	San Francisco	United States	Warfield Theatre
November 6, 2016	Seattle	United States	The Showbox
November 7, 2016	Portland	United States	Roseland Theater
November 9, 2016	Denver	United States	Ogden Theatre
November 11, 2016	Omaha	United States	Slowdown (venue)
November 13, 2016	Austin	United States	Emo's
November 14, 2016	Dallas	United States	House of Blues
November 15, 2016	San Antonio	United States	Alamo City Music Hall
November 17, 2016	Nashville	United States	Marathon Music Works
November 18, 2016	Atlanta	United States	Center Stage (Atlanta)
November 20, 2016	Raleigh	United States	Lincoln Theatre
November 21, 2016	Silver Spring	United States	The Fillmore
November 22, 2016	Philadelphia	United States	Electric Factory
November 23, 2016	New York City	United States	Terminal 5 (venue)
November 27, 2016	Pittsburgh	United States	Stage AE
November 28, 2016	Boston	United States	House of Blues
European Leg
March 18, 2017	Oslo	Norway	Parkteatret
March 19, 2017	Stockholm	Sweden	Debaser Strand
March 21, 2017	Copenhagen	Denmark	Pumpehuset
March 24, 2017	Warsaw	Poland	Proxima
March 25, 2017	Berlin	Germany	Gretchen
March 26, 2017	Cologne	Germany	Die Kantine
March 29, 2017	Munch	Germany	Muffathhalle
March 30, 2017	Milan	Italy	Fabrique
April 1, 2017	Paris	France	Trabendo
April 3, 2017	Leuven	Belgium	Het Depot
April 5, 2017	Amsterdam	Holland	Paradiso (Amsterdam)
April 6, 2017	London	United Kingdom	Heaven
April 8, 2017	Birmingham	United Kingdom	O2 Institute
April 10, 2017	Glasgow	United Kingdom	Garage
April 11, 2017	Manchester	United Kingdom	Academy 2
April 12, 2017	Dublin	Ireland	The Olympia Theatre

== Commercial performance ==
In the United States, The Human Condition debuted at number 5 on the Billboard 200, with 40,000 equivalent album units, marking the second highest debut of the week. It was the fourth best-selling album of the week, selling 32,000 copies in its first week. On September 7, 2017, the album was certified gold by the Recording Industry Association of America (RIAA) for combined sales and album-equivalent units of over 500,000 units in the United States. "Woke the F*ck Up" was certified gold, also by the RIAA, in December 2018.

== Charts ==
=== Weekly charts ===
Chart (2016–17)	Peak position
Australian Albums (ARIA)	69
Belgian Albums (Ultratop Flanders)	173
Danish Albums (Hitlisten)	32
Finnish Albums (Suomen virallinen lista)	38
Irish Albums (IRMA)	91
New Zealand Heatseekers Albums (RMNZ)	4
Norwegian Albums (VG-lista)	31
Swedish Albums (Sverigetopplistan)	60
UK Albums (Official Charts)	169
US Billboard 200	5

=== Year-end charts ===
Chart (2017)	Position
US Billboard 200	108

== Certifications ==
Region	Certification	Certified units/sales
Canada (Music Canada)	Gold	40,000^{‡}
Denmark (IFPI Danmark)	Gold	10,000^{‡}
New Zealand (RMNZ)	Platinum	15,000^{‡}
United States (RIAA)	Gold	500,000^{‡}
^{‡} Sales+streaming figures based on certification alone.
