= All Time Low (Jon Bellion song) =

2016 single by Jon Bellion

Single by Jon Bellion

from the album The Human Condition
- Released: May 13, 2016
- Recorded: 2014
- Length: 3:37
- Label: Visionary; Capitol
- Songwriters: Jon Bellion; Mark Williams; Raul Cubina; Travis Mendes
- Producers: Jon Bellion; Mark Williams; Raul Cubina

Jon Bellion singles chronology
"Beautiful Now" (2015)	"All Time Low" (2016)	"Overwhelming" (2017)

Music video
- "All Time Low" on YouTube

"All Time Low" is a song by American singer Jon Bellion. It was released to digital retailers on May 13, 2016, through Visionary Music Group and Capitol Records, and later to Top 40 radio on August 30, 2016, as the lead single from his debut studio album, The Human Condition (2016). Bellion co-produced and co-wrote the song along with Mark Williams, Raul Cubina, and Travis Mendes. Bellion also performed an acoustic version of the song on his YouTube channel.

== Background ==
In an interview with Idolator's Mike Wass, Bellion said "["All Time Low"] is an illustration of what it feels like to be three days into a break up — the really heavy, emotional, 'I don't even know if I want to continue living at this point.' I'm just being majorly honest and letting you know how horrible everything's been since you left. I don't think it's a specific situation but I want it to be broad so everyone can relate to that. I think everybody's been in that situation at least once in their life. Your first love... when that ends that's a devastating thing to feel."

== Release ==
The original "All Time Low" demo was released sometime in 2015. When asked about the release of the song, Bellion stated "I finished the song two years ago and said no matter what song I made after that, that was going to be my single. It was written so fast. I finished the song and wrote it so quickly. I think that's usually a telling for myself. There are numbers and letters in my head, and puzzle pieces. The way they all fit together so quickly and became the finished puzzle, I was like, 'This has to be a sign'. I fought for it, for about two years, for it to be the lead single. Now that it is, it's great to see that it's really working. It seems to be climbing. People are really gravitating toward it. It's a good sign. I'm excited." The official remix featuring a verse by American rapper A$AP Ferg was released on November 2, 2016. Another official remix featuring British rapper Stormzy was released on March 10, 2017, in the United Kingdom.

== Music video ==
The song's accompanying music video was uploaded on August 31, 2016, on Bellion's Vevo account on YouTube. The music video contains concert footage, from his Human Condition Tour.

== Track listing ==
Digital download
No.	Title	Length
1.	"All Time Low"	3:39

Digital download
No.	Title	Length
1.	"All Time Low" (featuring Stormzy)	3:39

== Charts and certifications ==
=== Weekly charts ===
Weekly chart performance for "All Time Low"
Chart (2016–2017)	Peak position
Australia (ARIA)	9
Austria (Ö3 Austria Top 40)	18
Belgium (Ultratip Bubbling Under Flanders)	7
Belgium (Ultratip Bubbling Under Wallonia)	24
Canada Hot 100 (Billboard)	16
Canada CHR/Top 40 (Billboard)	20
Canada Hot AC (Billboard)	32
Czech Republic Singles Digital (ČNS IFPI)	17
Denmark (Tracklisten)	28
Finland (Suomen virallinen lista)	15
Germany (GfK)	22
Ireland (IRMA)	55
Italy (FIMI)	70
Lebanon (Lebanese Top 20)	4
Malaysia (RIM)	9
Netherlands (Single Top 100)	52
New Zealand (Recorded Music NZ)	11
Norway (VG-lista)	24
Poland Airplay (ZPAV)	53
Portugal (AFP)	54
Scottish Singles Sales (Official Charts)	60
Slovakia Singles Digital (ČNS IFPI)	19
Sweden (Sverigetopplistan)	25
Switzerland (Schweizer Hitparade)	41
UK Singles (Official Charts)	86
US Billboard Hot 100	16
US Adult Pop Airplay (Billboard)	27
US Dance Airplay (Billboard)	16
US Pop Airplay (Billboard)	10

=== Year-end charts ===
Year and chart performance for "All Time Low"
Chart (2017)	Position
Australia (ARIA)	52
Austria (Ö3 Austria Top 40)	72
Canada (Canadian Hot 100)	75
Germany (Official German Charts)	78
Hungary (Stream Top 40)	95
US Billboard Hot 100	75
US Mainstream Top 40 (Billboard)	40

=== Certifications ===
Certifications for "All Time Low"
Region	Certification	Certified units/sales
Australia (ARIA)	2× Platinum	140,000^{‡}
Brazil (Pro-Música Brasil)	Platinum	60,000^{‡}
Canada (Music Canada)	2× Platinum	160,000^{‡}
Denmark (IFPI Danmark)	Platinum	90,000^{‡}
Germany (BVMI)	Gold	200,000^{‡}
Italy (FIMI)	Gold	25,000^{‡}
New Zealand (RMNZ)	4× Platinum	120,000^{‡}
Poland (ZPAV)	2× Platinum	100,000^{‡}
Sweden (GLF)	Gold	20,000^{‡}
United Kingdom (BPI)	Gold	400,000^{‡}
United States (RIAA)	4× Platinum	4,000,000^{‡}
^{‡} Sales+streaming figures based on certification alone.

== Release history ==
Release dates and formats for "All Time Low"
Region	Date	Format	Version	Label	Ref.
United States	May 13, 2016	Digital download	Original	Capitol	
United States	August 30, 2016	Top 40 radio	Original	Capitol	
United States	August 30, 2016	Mainstream radio	Original	Capitol	
Italy	January 27, 2017	Contemporary hit radio	Original	Universal	
United States	March 17, 2017	Digital download	Stormzy Remix	Capitol	
