= Jon Bellion =

American musician (born 1990)

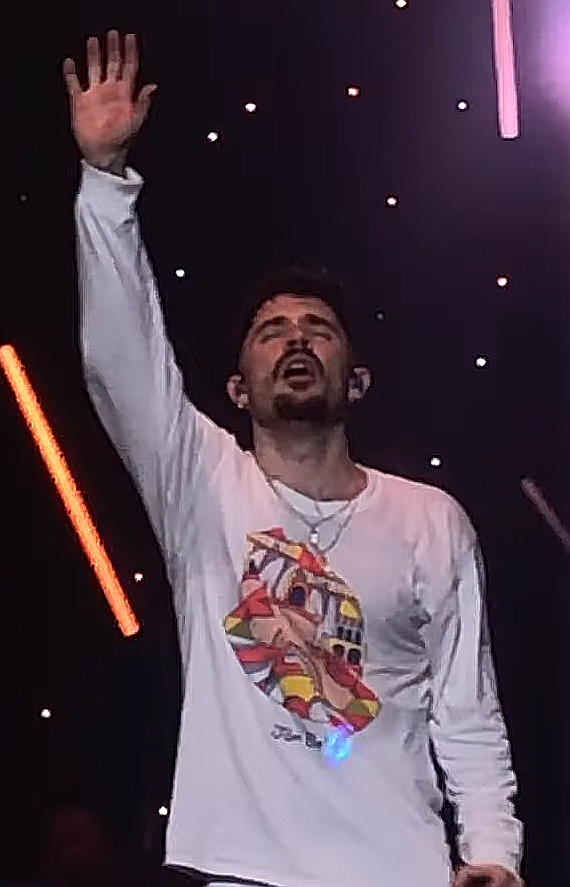
- Bellion performing at the Glory Sound Prep Tour in Raleigh, North Carolina in 2019

Background information
- Born: Jonathan David Bellion; December 26, 1990 (age 35); Lake Grove, New York, U.S.
- Origin: Dix Hills, New York, U.S.
- Genres: Pop; R&B; hip-hop; indie rock
- Occupations: Singer; songwriter; rapper; record producer
- Instruments: Vocals; guitar; piano; keyboards; synthesizer; sampler
- Years active: 2011–present
- Labels: Visionary; Beautiful Mind
- Website: jonbellion.com

Jonathan David Bellion (born December 26, 1990) is an American singer, songwriter, rapper and record producer. He is best known for his 2016 single "All Time Low," which peaked at number 16 on the Billboard Hot 100.

Alongside his recording career, he has produced and written material for various artists. His credits include BTS' Jung Kook and Jimin, Maroon 5, Justin Bieber, the Jonas Brothers, Halsey, Camila Cabello, Selena Gomez, Tori Kelly, Rosé, Max, Chris Brown and The Kid Laroi.

Bellion has released four mixtapes and three studio albums. Released by Visionary Music Group and Capitol Records, his debut studio album, The Human Condition (2016), peaked at number five on the US Billboard 200. His second, Glory Sound Prep (2018), peaked at number 15. Bellion also opened for Twenty One Pilots' Emotional Roadshow World Tour, which also featured guest artists Judah and the Lion.

== Early life ==
Bellion is of Italian descent, and his family comes from Naples. Torn between his love for basketball and music throughout high school, Bellion made the choice to pursue his music career in his junior year. After high school, he enrolled in the music program at the private Five Towns College in Dix Hills, New York.

At the age of 19, he decided to drop out of college and focus on writing professionally. He worked under songwriter and Warner Brothers A&R executive Kara DioGuardi for a year and signed a deal through her personal publishing company. Through this experience, Bellion learned how to write songs for different artists, in genres such as rock and hip hop.

== Career ==
=== 2011–2014: Early career and various mixtapes ===
Bellion's first mixtape, Scattered Thoughts Vol. 1 was released in early 2011 via his Facebook page and reached over 11,000 downloads. Bellion signed with Visionary Music Group in 2012 and released a cover of Drake's "The Motto" on VMG's YouTube page.

In 2012, Bellion wrote the chorus to the song "The Monster" by Eminem featuring Rihanna. This song won a Grammy Award in the 2015 Grammy Awards for Best Rap/Sung Collaboration. Bellion also co-wrote and produced the song "Trumpets" by Jason Derulo in 2012, which was not released until 2013 in the UK and 2014 in the US.

Bellion released his second mixtape, titled Translations Through Speakers on February 20, 2013, his third, The Separation on December 10 of the same year and his fourth, The Definition on September 23, 2014, along with the single "Luxury". Bellion also headlined his first national tour called The Beautiful Mind Tour in October 2014.

=== 2015–2017: Touring and The Human Condition ===
Bellion released several singles in early 2015, including "Woodstock (Psychedelic Fiction)", "All Time Low", and "Woke the Fuck Up" through Capitol Records. On March 31, 2015, Bellion announced his second national tour, The Definition Tour. The tour began on May 26 and concluded on July 2. Bellion was also featured on "Beautiful Now", a song on Zedd's album True Colors, which was released on May 15, 2015. Bellion was also featured on American rapper B.o.B's album Psycadelik Thoughtz on the song "Violence".

Bellion released several acoustic versions of his songs, including one of "All Time Low" on February 26, 2016, and one of "Human" on March 4, 2016. Bellion opened for Chance The Rapper at Syracuse University's Block Party on April 14, 2016.

Bellion confirmed that his debut album The Human Condition was set to be released on June 10, 2016. He released three promotional singles from the album: "Guillotine", on April 13, 2016, "80's Films", on May 27, 2016, and "Maybe IDK" on June 2, 2016. The lead single from the album, "All Time Low" was released on May 13, 2016 and became his most successful single to date, reaching number 16 on the US Billboard Hot 100 and was certified Double-platinum in the US and Australia. On June 10, The Human Condition was officially released. Bellion states that the album is simply about being human, explaining, "Us as humans all have the same problems. We struggle with pride and tons of different issues that nobody really wants to talk about. So I figured if I'm the honest one showing how human I am, it will make people feel better about themselves." In his music, Jon talks a lot about God. He doesn't just talk about a vague idea of faith; he makes sure to emphasize God specifically. Bellion also says the sonics and album artwork for The Human Condition were created in order to get the attention of Disney/Pixar, saying, "It's like a giant business plan for Disney Pixar because it's always been my dream to score a movie for them. So basically if my debut album blows up, John Lasseter [of Disney Pixar] and these guys will hopefully see these images and be like 'Wait a second this is not one of our movies, what is this?'" The artwork for the album was created by visual development artist David Ardinaryas Lojaya. During The Human Condition tour, Bellion announced that a representative from Pixar met him at one of his shows. He was invited to the Pixar Campus and said he might be involved with a Pixar film in the near future.

In June 2017, Bellion was picked as Elvis Duran's Artist of the Month and was featured on NBC's Today show hosted by Kathie Lee Gifford and Hoda Kotb and broadcast nationally where he performed "All Time Low" live. Bellion was the opening act for the US leg of rock duo Twenty One Pilots' 2017 Emotional Roadshow World Tour. The 33-show tour began on January 17 in Providence, Rhode Island and ended on March 5 in Louisville, Kentucky.

On October 13, 2017, Bellion released his mixtapes Translations Through Speakers, The Separation and The Definition on digital stores as well as releasing a collection containing the three mixtapes entitled Growth.

=== 2018: Glory Sound Prep ===
On January 25, Bellion teased a snippet of an upcoming song on an Instagram video. On April 16, Bellion began teasing his next album with 4 pictures captioned with "GSP". He later changed the name of his Instagram to his band/group "Beautiful Mind". On June 23, Bellion released a behind the scenes video of his previous album's last track, "Hand of God (Outro)".

On October 9, Bellion posted a photo to his Twitter account from "GSP Staff", stating: "Tomorrow, Headmaster Stormzy requests your presence for an orientation ceremony in the main atrium. Time: 3:00 pm EST." The following day he announced the studio album Glory Sound Prep on his Twitter account, which was set to be released on November 9. On October 17, he released a preview on his social media accounts of the first single from the album, "Conversations with My Wife", which was released on October 19. The following week, he released a preview on his social media accounts of the second single, "JT", and released it on October 26. "Stupid Deep", the third single off of the album, was released on November 2.

On November 9, Bellion released Glory Sound Prep.

=== 2019–2023: Producing and writing for other artists ===
Soon after the release of Glory Sound Prep, Bellion was cast for a voice role in the film Dragon Ball Super: Broly as Male Frieza soldier but had to step down to a lesser role due to a scheduling conflict.

On May 13, 2019, he released a collaboration with American DJ Illenium titled "Good Things Fall Apart". He also released a single titled "Crop Circles" on May 30. Bellion embarked on The Glory Sound Prep Tour, which began on June 12 and concluded on November 12 of the same year.

Over the next few years, Bellion helped co-produce and co-write hit singles such as "Vulnerable" by Selena Gomez, "Daisies" by Katy Perry, "Stacy" and "Life Must Go On" by Quinn XCII, "Liar" and "Shameless" by Camila Cabello, "Graveyard" by Halsey, and "Memories" by Maroon 5. In 2021, he worked as a major collaborator on multiple songs from Justin Bieber's sixth studio album, Justice, including the singles "Holy" featuring Chance the Rapper and "Ghost", the latter of which Bellion wrote about his late grandmother and which reached number one on the US Pop Radio.

On June 8, 2021, Bellion took to Twitter where he tweeted "New music" before quickly deleting the tweet. Bellion was featured on Lawrence's song "False Alarms" released July 22, 2021. Bellion released his first single in over two years, "I Feel It" featuring Burna Boy, on September 17, 2021.

On February 19, 2023, Bellion released an unfinished song called "Fallen" featuring Jon Batiste to his social media.

Bellion also helped co-write and co-produce every song on Jonas Brothers' sixth studio album, The Album (2023), including its three pre-release singles: "Wings", "Waffle House", and "Summer Baby". He then co-wrote and co-produced the song "Middle Ground" by Maroon 5. In 2024, he co-wrote and co-produced Tori Kelly's fifth album Tori.

==== Beautiful Mind Records ====
In July 2019, Bellion launched his own record label called Beautiful Mind Records and signed the pop/soul band, Lawrence. Lawrence was the opener for most of his shows on the Glory Sound Prep Tour. He helped write and produce three singles off of their 2021 debut album Hotel TV: "Casualty", "It's Not All About You", and "The Weather". Bellion has stated that his intention with this new label is to "take care of artists for the rest of their careers" and to create a family of musical creators with whom he supports and collaborates. In March 2023, Tori Kelly signed to his record label. In July 2023, Kelly released her self-titled EP. The following April, she released her fifth studio album Tori; all tracks on the album are co-written and co-produced by Bellion.

=== 2024–present: Father Figure ===
In May 2024, Bellion was interviewed by YouTuber George Janko, where he confirmed that he was about three months into producing his first solo album since Glory Sound Prep. He also revealed that he had paid himself out of his touring contract with Live Nation.

On September 17, 2024, Bellion posted an image of a link to his social media accounts. The linked website plays a 14-minute, behind-the-scenes video teasing the production of a new song called "Kid Again". The video also reveals that Bellion's recording contract with Visionary had been reversed.

On September 25, 2024, Bellion revealed that "Kid Again" would release on September 27. The song was Bellion's first solo release in nearly 6 years, and first release as a primary artist in three years since "I Feel It", his collaboration with Burna Boy.

On March 17, 2025, Bellion announced that “Wash” would release March 21 as a single from his next album. The song released with an accompanying music video shot in Iceland. A downloadable version of the song was shared with fans on Bellion's email list and forum, beautifulmind.club, two days prior to the song's release. Bellion revealed on his X account that the new album was called Father Figure.

After the album's tracklist and cover art were revealed, its opening track "Horoscope" was released as a single on April 18. The song features Pharrell Williams, who was a major influence of Bellion's. On May 23, Jon released "Why" featuring Luke Combs that was written 48 hours before the birth of Jon's first of his 3 sons.

On June 4, Bellion released Father Figure.

== Influences ==
Bellion has stated on multiple occasions that Kanye West is one of his biggest inspirations. "I loved everything but it was Kanye West who really changed everything for me." Bellion has also stated that he was inspired by Eminem, Pharrell Williams, Coldplay, John Mayer, André 3000, and Paul Simon. Bellion has also made it known that he is a big fan of J Dilla and the animated film studio Pixar, drawing inspiration from both for The Definition and The Human Condition. Bellion explains that he loves how Pixar movies are "simple yet presented in a way that is groundbreaking". Bellion credits much of his musical development and success to his bandmates whom he met while in college, expressing his love for them in his Beautiful Mind documentary, stating, "everybody in my band has taught me something, and has gotten me to where I am because of them... I surround myself with people better than me at something, you will very rarely see somebody around me, especially musically, who I don't look up to."

== Personal life ==
Bellion announced that he was married during the early months of 2018. He and his wife have three sons together.

Bellion is a Christian, and often references his faith in his work.

== Discography ==
Studio albums

- The Human Condition (2016)
- Glory Sound Prep (2018)
- Father Figure (2025)

== Awards and nominations ==
Award	Year	Category	Work	Result	Ref.
Grammy Awards	2022	Album of the Year	Justice	Nominated	
Grammy Awards	2023	Album of the Year	Special	Nominated	
Grammy Awards	2024	Album of the Year	World Music Radio	Nominated	
Grammy Awards	2024	Record of the Year	"Worship"	Nominated	
Hollywood Music in Media Awards	2022	Best Original Song in a Documentary	"My Mind & Me"	Nominated	
MTV Europe Music Awards	2017	Best Push Act	—	Nominated	
