= Back and Forth (B.o.B song) =

Promotional single by B.o.B

from the album Psycadelik Thoughtz
- Released: August 13, 2015
- Genre: Funk; disco
- Length: 3:43
- Label: Rebel Rock; Grand Hustle; Atlantic
- Songwriter: Bobby Ray Simmons, Jr.
- Producers: B.o.B; Jamieson Jones

"Back and Forth" is a song by American hip hop recording artist B.o.B. It was released on August 13, 2015, in promotion of his experimental project, Psycadelik Thoughtz (2015).

== Composition ==
"Back and Forth" is a funk and disco, up-tempo record with a heavily Auto-Tuned chorus. The song was compared by many critics to works of French electronic music duo Daft Punk and American rapper Snoop Dogg.

== Track listing ==
Digital single

| No. | Title | Producer(s) | Length |
|---|---|---|---|
| 1. | "Back and Forth" | B.o.B, Jamieson Jones | 3:43 |

== Release history ==
| Country | Date | Format | Label |
|---|---|---|---|
| United States | August 13, 2015 | Digital download | Rebel Rock, Grand Hustle, Atlantic Records |
