= Father Figure (album) =

Studio album by Jon Bellion
- Released: June 4, 2025
- Recorded: 2024–2025
- Studio: Beautiful Mind
- Length: 49:04
- Label: Beautiful Mind; Virgin
- Producer: Anca Trio Plus One; Jon Bellion; George Benavides; Thom Bridges; Colin Brittain; Rogét Chahayed; Aaron Dessner; The Diner; Elkan; Fallen; Allen Ritter; Blake Slatkin; The Monsters & Strangerz; Pete Nappi; Johnny Simpson; Spearfisher; Stavros; TenRoc

Jon Bellion chronology
Glory Sound Prep (2018)	Father Figure (2025)

Singles from Father Figure
- 1. "Kid Again" Released: September 27, 2024; 2. "Wash" Released: March 21, 2025; 3. "Horoscope" Released: April 18, 2025; 4. "Why" Released: May 23, 2025

Father Figure (stylized as FATHER FIGURE) is the third studio album by American singer-songwriter Jon Bellion. The album was released on June 4, 2025, through Bellion's record label, Beautiful Mind Records, and Virgin Music Group. It was supported by four official singles: "Kid Again", "Wash", "Horoscope", and "Why". The album includes features from Pharrell Williams, Luke Combs, and Jon Batiste.

== Background and release ==
On May 23, 2024, YouTuber George Janko posted an interview with Bellion, where he shared that he was roughly three months into working on his first solo album since Glory Sound Prep. During the interview, he went on to disclose that he had compensated himself by exiting his touring agreement with Live Nation Entertainment.

On September 17, 2024, Bellion shared an image of a link on his social media platforms, directing users to a website featuring a 14-minute behind-the-scenes video that offers a preview of the production process for the album's first single titled "Kid Again." Additionally, the video reveals that Bellion's recording contract with Visionary has been reversed. On September 25, 2024, Bellion announced that "Kid Again" would release on September 27, making it Bellion's first solo release in nearly six years.

On March 17, 2025, Bellion announced that “Wash” would be released on March 21 as the third album's second single. The song debuted alongside a music video filmed in Iceland. Two days prior to the official release, fans subscribed to Bellion's email list and forum, beautifulmind.club, were given access to a downloadable version of the track. On April 15, Bellion announced that the third album would be titled "Father Figure", releasing on June 4.

Following the unveiling of the album's tracklist and cover art, the opening track, "Horoscope," was released on April 18 as the third single. The song features Pharrell Williams, who is one of Bellion's major influences. On May 23, Bellion released the album's fourth single, "Why", which features country singer Luke Combs. The song was written two days prior to the birth of Jon's first child.

== Track listing ==
No.	Title	Writer(s)	Producer(s)	Length
1.	"Horoscope" (featuring Pharrell Williams)	Jonathan Bellion; Rogét Chahayed; Jason Cornet; Alexander Izquierdo; Pete Nappi; Pharrell Williams	Bellion^{[p]}; Nappi; TenRoc; Chahayed	3:57
2.	"Father Figure"	Bellion; Paul Agyei; Thom Bridges; Dougie Ford; Gregory Hein; Nappi	Bellion^{[p]}; Nappi; Bridges; Elkan	3:51
3.	"Oblivious"	Bellion; Cornet; Hein; Nappi; Lee Stashenko; Stavros Tsarouhas	Bellion^{[p]}; Nappi; TenRoc; Fallen; Stavros	4:46
4.	"Why" (featuring Luke Combs)	Bellion; Amy Allen; Aaron Dessner; Blake Slatkin	Bellion^{[p]}; Slatkin; Dessner; Nappi; TenRoc^{[c]}; The Diner^{[c]}; Chip Matthews^{[v]}	2:57
5.	"Wash"	Bellion; Cornet; Jordan K. Johnson; Stef Johnson; Nappi	Bellion^{[p]}; TenRoc; The Monsters & Strangerz; Nappi	3:36
6.	"Vinny's Artichokes"	Bellion	Bellion	0:31
7.	"Italia Breeze"	Bellion; Anca Trio Plus One; Cornet; Nappi	Bellion^{[p]}Nappi; TenRoc; Anca Trio Plus One	3:20
8.	"Get It Right"	Bellion; Anca Trio Plus One; Jordan Cohen; Jonny Koh; Clyde Lawrence; Gracie Lawrence; Lee Lawrence; Johnny Simpson	Bellion^{[p]}; Nappi; TenRoc; Anca Trio Plus One; The Diner; Simpson	4:13
9.	"Kid Again"	Bellion; Cornet; Nappi; Elijah Noll; Simpson	Bellion; Nappi; TenRoc; Simpson	3:19
10.	"Modern Times" (featuring Jon Batiste)	Bellion; Jon Batiste; Cornet; Nappi	Bellion^{[p]}; Nappi; TenRoc; The Diner^{[c]}	3:05
11.	"Wash2"	Bellion; Cornet; J. Johnson; S. Johnson	Bellion^{[p]}	3:41
12.	"Rich and Broke"	Bellion; George Benavides; Cornet; Nappi; Lemuel George Payne Jr.; Eugene Pressley; Allen Ritter	Bellion^{[p]}; Nappi; TenRoc; Ritter; Benavides; The Diner	4:02
13.	"Don't Shoot"	Bellion; Agyei; Cornet; Nappi; Noll; Stashenko	Bellion^{[p]}; Nappi; TenRoc; Fallen; Elkan; The Diner; Colin Brittain	4:16
14.	"My Boy"	Bellion; Spearfisher	Bellion^{[p]}; Nappi; TenRoc; Spearfisher	3:23
Total length:				49:04

=== Notes ===
- ^{^[p]} signifies a primary and vocal producer
- ^{^[c]} signifies a co-producer
- ^{^[v]} signifies a vocal producer

== Personnel ==
Credits adapted from Tidal.

=== Musicians ===
- Jon Bellion – vocals (all tracks), keyboards (tracks 1–5, 8–10, 12–14), drums (1–5, 8, 9, 12, 13), programming (1, 2, 4, 5, 7–10, 12–14), guitar (1, 3, 5, 8–10, 12, 13), horn (1, 8), bass (2, 4, 10), piano (3, 11), drum programming (10)
- Pete Nappi – keyboards (1–5, 9, 10, 12–14), drums (1–3, 9, 12, 13), programming (1, 2, 5, 7, 9, 10, 12–14), guitar (1, 3, 9, 10, 13), horn (1), bass (2), drum programming (10)
- TenRoc – programming (1, 3, 5, 7–10, 12, 13), drums (1, 5, 8, 9, 12), keyboards (1, 5, 10, 12), guitar (5, 10, 13); bass, drum programming (10)
- Rogét Chahayed – keyboards, programming (1)
- Elkan – bass, keyboards, programming, vocals (2)
- Thom Bridges – drums, programming (2)
- Dougie F – vocals (2)
- Fallen – programming (3)
- Stavros – programming (3)
- Aaron Dessner – bass, drums, guitar, keyboards, programming (4)
- Blake Slatkin – guitar, keyboards, programming (4)
- Luke Combs – vocals (4)
- The Monsters & Strangerz – keyboards, programming (5)
- Anca Trio Plus One – horn, guitar (7, 8); cello, keyboards, programming, violin (7); drums (8)
- Johnny Simpson – drums, programming (8, 9); guitar, keyboards (9)
- The Diner – guitar, programming (8, 12, 13); drums, horn, keyboards (8); drum programming (10)
- Lawrence – vocals (8)
- Lil Mo Mozzarella – vocals (8)
- Teddy Swims – vocals (8)
- Jordan Rose – drums (10)
- Jon Batiste – vocals (10)
- Brayla Cook – background vocals (12)
- Allen Ritter – keyboards, programming (12)
- Eugene Pressley – vocals (12)
- Clyde Lawrence – drums (13)
- Colin Brittain – guitar (13)
- Fallen – programming (13)
- Spearfisher – background vocals, programming (14)
- Cicely Parnas – background vocals (14)

=== Technical ===
- Jon Bellion – mixing (1–5, 7–14)
- Manny Marroquin – mixing (1–5, 8–14)
- Alex Stein – mixing (7)
- Zach Pereyra – mastering (1–6, 8–14)
- Ruairi O'Flaherty – mastering (7)
- Pete Nappi – engineering (1–5, 7, 9–14)
- John Arbuckle – engineering (3, 4, 7–13)
- Aaron Dessner – engineering (4)
- Bella Blasko – engineering (4)
- Blake Slatkin – engineering (4)
- Chip Matthews – engineering (4)
- Stefan Johnson – engineering (5)
- Johnny Simpson – engineering (8, 9)
- The Diner – engineering (8)
- Spearfisher – engineering (14)

== Charts ==
Chart performance for Father Figure
Chart (2025)	Peak position
Australian Vinyl Albums (ARIA)	8
US Top Album Sales (Billboard)	12
