= Glory Sound Prep =

Studio album by Jon Bellion
- Released: November 9, 2018
- Recorded: 2017–2018
- Studio: Cove City Sound Studios (Glen Cove, New York)
- Genre: Pop; R&B; hip hop; rock
- Length: 43:21
- Label: Visionary; Capitol
- Producer: Jon Bellion; Mark Williams; Raul Cubina; Aaron Dales; Mylon Hayde; busbee; Tuamie

Jon Bellion chronology
The Human Condition (2016)	Glory Sound Prep (2018)	Father Figure (2025)

Singles from Glory Sound Prep
- 1. "Conversations with My Wife" Released: October 19, 2018; 2. "JT" Released: October 26, 2018; 3. "Stupid Deep" Released: November 2, 2018

Glory Sound Prep is the second studio album by American singer-songwriter Jon Bellion. The album was released on November 9, 2018, through Visionary Music Group and Capitol Records. It was supported by three official singles: "Conversations with My Wife", "JT", and "Stupid Deep". The album was announced via Bellion's Twitter on October 10, 2018.

== Background and release ==
On January 25, 2018, Bellion teased a snippet of an upcoming song on an Instagram video. On April 16, Bellion began teasing his next album with 4 pictures captioned with "GSP". He later changed the name of his Instagram to the name of his touring group, "Beautiful Mind".

On October 9, Bellion posted a photo to his social media accounts from "GSP Staff", stating: "Tomorrow, Headmaster Stormzy requests your presence for an orientation ceremony in the main atrium. Time: 3:00 pm EST." The following day he announced his second studio album Glory Sound Prep on his Twitter account, set to be released on November 9. On October 17, he released a preview on his social media accounts of the first single from the album, "Conversations with My Wife", which was released two days later. The following week, he released a preview on his social media accounts of the second promotional single, "JT", and released it on October 26. "Stupid Deep", the third promotional single from the album, was released on November 2.

In a 2019 Genius: For the Record Interview with Rob Markman, Jon explained that Glory Sound Prep is also the name of a production group composed of himself, Mark Williams, and Raul Cubina. He also explained that he decided not to heavily promote the album as a result of being tired from promoting his previous album, The Human Condition. He claimed he felt it was more valuable to leave the audience to sit with and digest the album.

== Track listing ==
No.	Title	Writer(s)	Producer(s)	Length
1.	"Conversations with My Wife"	Jonathan Bellion; Mark Williams; Raul Cubina	Jon Bellion; Williams; Cubina	3:26
2.	"JT"	Bellion; Travis Mendes; Williams; Cubina	Bellion; Williams; Cubina	4:28
3.	"Let's Begin" (featuring Roc Marciano, RZA, B.Keyz and Travis Mendes)	Bellion; Williams; Cubina; Mendes; Hakim Hardy; Aaron Dales; Mylon Hayde	Bellion; Williams; Cubina; Dales; Hayde	5:40
4.	"Stupid Deep"	Bellion; Mendes; Williams; Cubina; Christianne Jensen	Bellion; Williams; Cubina	2:58
5.	"The Internet"	Bellion; Mendes; Williams; Cubina; Homer Steinweiss	Bellion; Williams; Cubina	3:09
6.	"Blu"	Bellion; Williams; Cubina; Scott Friedman; Michael Busbee	Bellion; Williams; Cubina; busbee	3:03
7.	"Adult Swim" (featuring Tuamie)	Bellion; Williams; Cubina; Tuamutef Ani; Latrice Speights; Ryan Raddon; Finn Bjarnson; Amy Gileadi; Jonathan Gileadi; Craig Poole; Babbie Mason; Robert Wannamaker	Bellion; Williams; Cubina; Tuamie	5:13
8.	"Couples Retreat"	Bellion; Mendes; Williams; Cubina	Bellion; Williams; Cubina	3:28
9.	"Cautionary Tales"	Bellion; Mendes; Williams; Cubina; Steinweiss; JD McCrary	Bellion; Williams; Cubina	3:47
10.	"Mah's Joint" (featuring Quincy Jones)	Bellion; Williams; Cubina	Bellion; Williams; Cubina	8:01
Total length:				43:21

== Personnel ==
Credits adapted from the album's liner notes.

=== Glory Sound Prep ===
- Jon Bellion - producer, lead vocals, MPC, synthesizer, programming, percussion, piano, whistle, string composer, sound design (track 7)
- Raul Cubina - producer, sound design, synthesizer, programming, percussion, drums, background vocals, engineer, mixing engineer (track 8)
- Mark Williams - producer, sound design, synthesizer, programming, percussion, guitar, bass guitar, mandolin, banjo, piano, ROLI, organ, background vocals, horn arrangement (tracks 5, 10), string arrangement (tracks 7, 10)

=== Musicians ===
- Travis Mendes - lead vocals (track 3), background vocals (tracks 2, 4, 5, 8)
- B.Keyz - lead vocals (track 3)
- RZA - lead vocals (track 3)
- Christopher Sabat - lead vocals (track 7)
- Quincy Jones - lead vocals (track 10)
- Nylo - background vocals (track 2)
- Daron Lameek - background vocals (track 2)
- Sheldon-Ray Murray - background vocals (track 2)
- Melissa McMillan - background vocals (tracks 2, 4)
- Samira Gibson - background vocals (track 2)
- Camille Trczinski - background vocals (tracks 2, 4)
- John Splithoff - background vocals (track 4)
- Schadrack Pierre - background vocals (track 4)
- Christianne Jensen - background vocals (track 4)
- JD McCrary - background vocals (track 9)
- James McCrary - background vocals (track 9)
- Ava Pagliarulo - background vocals (track 9)
- Kate Sexton - background vocals (track 9)
- Emma Sexton - background vocals (track 9)
- Aaron "ys" Dales - bass guitar (track 3)
- Mylon Hayde - MPC, programming (track 3), background vocals (track 10)
- busbee - piano (track 6)
- Homer Steinweiss - drums (tracks 5, 10), percussion (track 10)
- Stan Orlovsky - cello (tracks 3, 10)
- Leigh Stuart - cello (track 7)
- Boris Deviatov - viola (tracks 3, 10)
- Eddy Malave - viola (track 7)
- William Frampton - viola (track 7)
- Alexander Abayev - violin (tracks 3, 10)
- Karen Dekker - violin (track 7)
- Zach Brock - violin (track 10)
- Ibanda Ruhumbika - sousaphone, tambourine (track 10)
- David Guy - trumpet (tracks 5, 10)
- Michael Leonhart - trumpet (tracks 5, 10), flugelhorn (track 10)
- Frosty Lawson - trumpet (track 6), flugelhorn (tracks 6, 10)
- Ryan Svendsen - trumpet (track 7)
- John Gibson - trombone (track 5)
- Clark Gayton - trombone (track 5)
- Frank Cohen - trombone (track 10)
- Nick Grinder - trombone (track 10)
- Richard Cannata - tenor sax (tracks 5, 10), flute (track 8)
- Ian Hendrickson-Smith - baritone sax (tracks 5, 10)

=== Production ===
- John Arbuckle - engineer
- Nylo - engineer (track 2)
- Manny Marroquin - mixing engineer
- Chris Galland - mixing engineer
- Raul Torres - assistant mixing engineer
- Jens Jungkurth - additional engineer (tracks 4, 5, 10)
- Homer Steinweiss - assistant engineer (track 10)
- Ben Dotson - post-production audio editing
- Emerson Mancini - mastering
- Mike Bozzi - mastering (tracks 2 & 5)
- Chris Connors - strings composer (track 3), engraver (tracks 5, 10)
- David Ardinaryas Lojaya - album art
- Recorded at Cove City Sound Studios — Glen Cove, New York
- Recorded at Diamond Mine Recording — Long Island City, New York (tracks 5, 10)

== Charts ==
Chart (2018)	Peak position
Australian Digital Albums (ARIA)	44
Irish Albums (IRMA)	86
US Billboard 200	15
