= MP808 =

American record producer and songwriter

- Born: Terrell McNeal
- Genres: Hip hop; trap
- Occupations: Record producer; songwriter
- Instrument: FL Studio
- Years active: 2014–present
- Label: 808 Mafia

Terrell McNeal, professionally known as MP808, is an American record producer and songwriter. He is best known for his production as part of the American record production group 808 Mafia, as well as artists Meek Mill, Future and Chief Keef.

== Career ==
MP808 would meet American record producer Southside, who would eventually give him a spot on his production group, 808 Mafia. For the next few years, MP808 would work closely with fellow 808 Mafia record producer TM88.

== Production credits ==
=== 2014 ===
Migos - Trouble (Single)

- 01. "Trouble (feat. T.I.)" (produced with TM88)

31 - Scale Tales

- 02. "Shit"

=== 2015 ===
Chief Keef - Finally Rollin 2

- 19. "K" (produced with TM88)

French Montana - Casino Life 2: Brown Bag Legend

- 07. "5 Mo (feat. Travis Scott & Lil Durk)" (produced with TM88)

Future - EVOL

- 07. "Seven Rings" (produced with TM88)

Lil Uzi Vert - Luv is Rage

- 05. "Yamborghini Dream (feat. Young Thug)" (produced with TM88)

=== 2016 ===
Meek Mill - DC4

- 01. "On The Regular (Intro)" (produced with RaRa)

T.I. - Us or Else: Letter to the System

- 03. "Black Man (feat. Quavo, Meek Mill and Ra Ra)" (produced with Lil' C, Mars, and Rossi)

=== 2017 ===
Meek Mill - Wins & Losses

- 03. "Fuck That Check Up (feat. Lil Uzi Vert)" (produced with Tazzaracci & RaRa)

=== 2018 ===
Rae Sremmurd – SR3MM

- 08. "Rock n Roll Hall of Fame" (produced with TM88)

YG – Stay Dangerous

- 03. "Handgun (feat A$AP Rocky)"(produced with TM88)

== See also ==
- 808 Mafia
- EVOL
