= Label No Genre =

American independent record label

No Genre
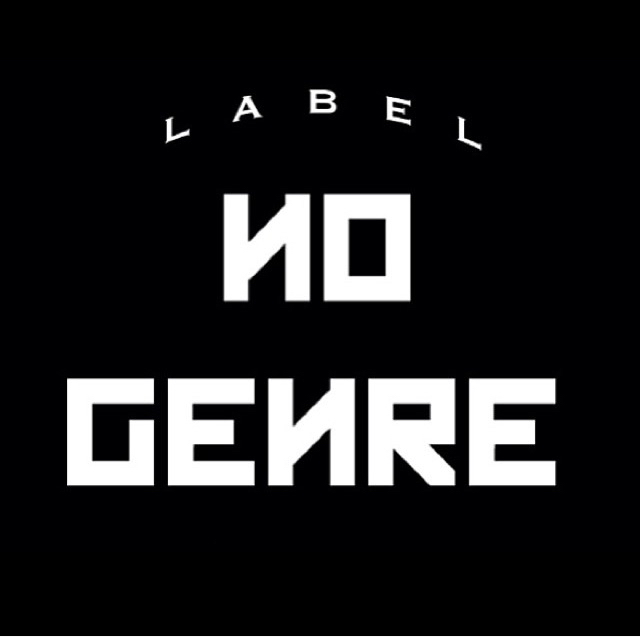
- Founded: 2014
- Founder: B.o.B
- Status: Inactive
- Distributor: EMPIRE
- Genre: Various
- Country of origin: United States
- Location: Atlanta, Georgia
- Official website: www.labelnogenre.com

Label No Genre is an Atlanta, Georgia-based independent record label, founded in 2014, by American recording artist and music producer B.o.B.

== History ==
In September 2013, B.o.B revealed he had plans to launch his own record label imprint. During an interview, he stated "I'm putting my CEO pants on, man. I'm finna start a label called HamSquad and I'm looking for artists to be the flagship artists for the label. So I'm really excited about that." Before 'HamSquad Records', HamSquad originally referred to the production/rap collective of B.o.B, Playboy Tre, DJ Swatts, DJ Smooth, Moss B, B-Rich and TJ Chapman.

In 2014, B.o.B started searching the internet for independent artists, he was originally believed to be scouting talent for his mixtape No Genre Pt. 2. He would start posting pictures on Instagram of a logo which contained the words "Label No Genre" getting the word out that he was starting his own label. On June 9, 2014, in an interview with Bootleg Kev, B.o.B announced his new record label imprint would be called Label No Genre, named after his 2010 mixtape. The only member of the roster to actually land a spot on the No Genre Pt. 2 mixtape was Jake Lambo. B.o.B would keep the label's roster under wraps until it was unveiled on the 2015 compilation mixtape, No Genre: The Label.

== Artists ==
=== Current acts ===
Act	Year signed	Releases under the label
B.o.B	Founder	2
Jake Lambo	2014	—
JaqueBeatz	2014	—
Lin-Z	2014	—
London Jae	2014	1
Scotty ATL	2014	—

== Releases ==
Artist	Album	Details
B.o.B	No Genre 2	Released: July 9, 2014
Various artists	No Genre: The Label	Released: January 3, 2015
Jake Lambo	Unorthodox	Released: May 28, 2015
Jake Lambo	1st Period	Released: May 28, 2015
London Jae	Better L8te Than Never	Released: May 28, 2015
Jaquebeatz	The Good Beatz	Released: July 1, 2015
B.o.B and London Jae	NASA	Released: November 23, 2015
Lin-Z	Damn	Released: January 29, 2016
London Jae	Me and My H.O.E.S.	Released: February 16, 2016
London Jae	Pain Killer	Released: May 13, 2016
Jaquebeatz	Columbia	Released: July 22, 2016
B.o.B	Elements	Released: November 4, 2016
Various artists	Don't Call It a Christmas Album	Released: November 25, 2016
London Jae	Ambition	Released: April 7, 2017
B.o.B	Ether (released with Empire)	Released: May 12, 2017; Chart position: #179 U.S.
London Jae	10 Summers	Released: July 4, 2017
