= Psycadelik Thoughtz =

Mixtape by B.o.B
- Released: August 14, 2015
- Recorded: 2015
- Genre: Hip-hop
- Length: 40:26
- Labels: Grand Hustle; Atlantic; Rebel Rock
- Producers: Arthur McArthur; B.o.B; Cook Classics; G-Tek; Geoffro Cause; Jamieson Jones; JaqueBeatz; Jeremy Davis; Joe Fitz; Kyle King

B.o.B chronology
Underground Luxury (2013)	Psycadelik Thoughtz (2015)	Elements (2016)

Professional ratings
Review scores
Source	Rating
AllMusic	3/5 stars
HipHopDX	2.5/5 stars

Psycadelik Thoughtz is the twelfth mixtape by American rapper B.o.B. The album was released on August 14, 2015, by Grand Hustle Records, Atlantic Records and Rebel Rock Entertainment. The song "Back and Forth" was released online a day before the album release.

== Background ==
B.o.B described the project in a Twitter post, saying "To my fans: I've seen all of your messages, tweets, and instagram posts as I've been busy in the studio working on my album, but first...I want to release a very special project. This body of work is more than music, It's an experience!" B.o.B said he returned to his older persona of Bobby Ray, which he utilized on his mixtapes B.o.B vs. Bobby Ray (2009) and May 25th (2010), as well as his debut album B.o.B Presents: The Adventures of Bobby Ray (2010). In an interview with HipHopDX, B.o.B said: " It was a surprise project. It was a project where I wasn’t trying to reach anyone’s expectations or aim anywhere in particular. I wanted to do something that was cohesive. And, it all stands from "Back and Forth," the lead out single. I wanted to make something that could support it. It started off as being an EP and then grew into a whole project. I feel like this project is so special because the people have been asking for Bobby Ray and this is Bobby Ray in full form. At the same time, it’s the next step in getting me to where I’m going. I have to show people this. On my next album, it’s going to be even crazier. Not left so to speak but just what you’d expect from me."

== Track listing ==
No.	Title	Producer(s)	Length
1.	"Psycadelik Thoughtz"	Cook Classics	3:39
2.	"Violence" (featuring Jon Bellion)	B.o.B; JaqueBeatz	2:26
3.	"Confucius" (featuring Soaky Siren)	Arthur McArthur; B.o.B	3:26
4.	"Back and Forth"	B.o.B; Jamieson Jones^{[a]}	3:43
5.	"Plain Jane"	G-Tek; B.o.B	3:00
6.	"Hourglass"	B.o.B; Geoffro Cause^{[a]}	3:48
7.	"Violet Vibrato"	B.o.B; Kyle King^{[a]}; JaqueBeatz^{[a]}; Jeremy Davis^{[a]}	4:54
8.	"Up"	B.o.B; JaqueBeatz	4:33
9.	"Joburg"	B.o.B	3:48
10.	"Love Life" (featuring Sevyn Streeter)	B.o.B; Joe Fitz	3:36
11.	"Have Nots"	B.o.B; Kyle King^{[a]}; JaqueBeatz^{[a]}	3:33
Total length:			40:26

- ^{^a} signifies a co-producer.

== Personnel ==
Credits for Psycadelik Thoughtz adapted from AllMusic

- Jon Bellion — featured artist
- B.o.B — primary artist
- Soaky Siren — featured artist
- Sevyn Streeter — featured artist

== Charts ==
Chart (2015)	Peak position
US Billboard 200	97
US Top R&B/Hip-Hop Albums (Billboard)	10
US Top Rap Albums (Billboard)	7
