= B.o.B discography =

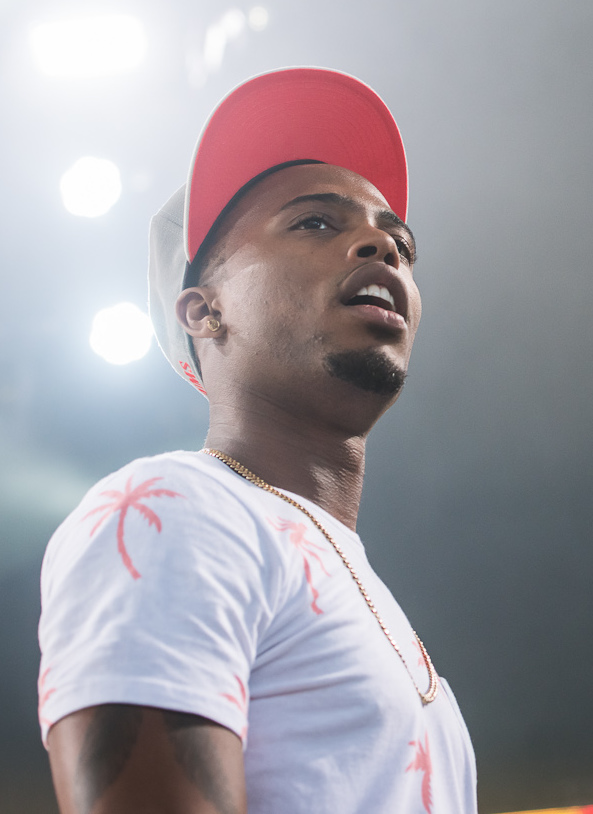
- B.o.B at the Under the Influence Tour in Toronto, Ontario, Canada on August 10, 2013.
- Studio albums: 8
- Extended plays: 4
- Compilation albums: 5
- Singles: 51
- Music videos: 76
- Mixtapes: 26
- Promotional singles: 14

The discography of American rapper B.o.B consists of seven studio albums, five compilation albums, three extended plays (EPs), 26 mixtapes, 51 singles (including 29 as a featured artist), 14 promotional singles, and 76 music videos.

B.o.B released his debut album, B.o.B Presents: The Adventures of Bobby Ray, on April 27, 2010. Upon its release, he became the thirteenth male solo artist, to have a debut album arrive at number one on the US Billboard 200. B.o.B quickly rose to fame, after his commercial debut single, "Nothin' on You" (featuring Bruno Mars). The song reached at number one in both the United States and the United Kingdom. He would later release his third single, "Airplanes" (featuring Hayley Williams), which also topped several music charts. The album's fifth single, "Magic" (featuring Rivers Cuomo), became his third top ten hit on the US Billboard Hot 100. B.o.B's debut studio album, which was preceded by two EPs and several mixtapes, was eventually Gold by the Recording Industry Association of America (RIAA).

B.o.B released his second studio album, Strange Clouds, on May 1, 2012. Strange Clouds spawned six singles, four of which all charted well internationally. "Strange Clouds" (featuring Lil Wayne), the album's eponymous lead single, became his fourth top ten hit on the Billboard Hot 100 chart. The singles "So Good", "Both of Us" and "Out of My Mind" (featuring Nicki Minaj), followed behind, with the former two being Platinum by the Recording Industry Association of America (RIAA). The album itself debuted at number five on the US Billboard 200.

B.o.B released his third studio album, Underground Luxury, on December 17, 2013. The album was supported by five singles, namely "We Still in This Bitch" (featuring T.I. and Juicy J), "HeadBand" (featuring 2 Chainz), "Ready" (featuring Future), "John Doe" and "Throwback" (featuring Chris Brown). In 2017, he released his recent album Ether on May 12, 2017, which was his first independent album released through his own label No Genre.

== Albums ==
=== Studio albums ===
List of albums, with selected chart positions, sales figures and certifications
Title	Album details	Peak chart positions										Sales	Certifications
Title	Album details	US	US R&B/ HH	US Rap	AUS	CAN	GER	IRL	NZ	SWI	UK	Sales	Certifications
B.o.B Presents: The Adventures of Bobby Ray	Released: April 27, 2010; Label: Grand Hustle, Rebel Rock, Atlantic; Formats: CD, digital download, streaming	1	1	1	42	7	93	34	21	47	17	US: 597,000	RIAA: 2× Platinum; MC: Gold; BPI: Gold
Strange Clouds	Released: May 1, 2012; Label: Grand Hustle, Rebel Rock, Atlantic; Formats: CD, digital download, streaming	5	1	1	32	7	46	22	26	23	30	US: 297,000	RIAA: Platinum
Underground Luxury	Released: December 17, 2013; Label: Grand Hustle, Rebel Rock, Atlantic; Formats: CD, digital download, streaming	22	7	3	—	—	—	—	—	—	—		RIAA: Gold
Ether	Released: May 12, 2017; Label: Grand Hustle, No Genre, Empire; Formats: CD, digital download, streaming	179	—	—	—	—	—	—	—	—	—		
Naga	Released: July 5, 2018; Label: No Genre; Formats: digital download, streaming	—	—	—	—	—	—	—	—	—	—		
Somnia	Released: September 11, 2020; Label: Bobby Ray Music, Empire; Formats: digital download, streaming	—	—	—	—	—	—	—	—	—	—		
Better Than Drugs	Released: August 19, 2022; Label: Bobby Ray Music; Formats: digital download, streaming	—	—	—	—	—	—	—	—	—	—		
A Town Full of Nowhere	Released: April 14, 2023; Label: B.o.B. music; Formats: digital download, streaming	—	—	—	—	—	—	—	—	—	—		
Space Time	Released: August 16, 2024; Label: CWE Distro; Formats: digital download, streaming	—	—	—	—	—	—	—	—	—	—		
"—" denotes a recording that did not chart or was not released in that territory.

=== Compilation albums ===
List of albums, with selected chart positions, sales figures and certifications
Title	Album details	Peak chart positions		
Title	Album details	US Ind.	US R&B/ HH	US Rap
Elements	Released: November 4, 2016; Label: No Genre; Formats: Digital download, LP	10	18	10
Don't Call It a Christmas Album (with No Genre)	Released: November 25, 2016; Label: No Genre; Formats: Digital download	—	—	—
We Want Smoke (with Hustle Gang)	Released: October 13, 2017; Label: Grand Hustle, Roc Nation; Formats: CD, digital download	—	—	—
Greatest Hits	Released: March 21, 2019; Label: No Genre, The Dispensary; Formats: CD, digital download, streaming	—	—	—
Lost Tapes (with Zaytoven)	Released: February 18, 2021; Label: Zaytoven Global, LLC; Formats: Digital download	—	—	—

== Extended plays ==
List of extended plays, with selected details
Title	Album details	Peak chart positions
Title	Album details	US R&B/ HH
Eastside	Released: June 24, 2007; Label: Atlantic; Formats: Digital download	—
12th Dimension	Released: June 24, 2008; Label: Atlantic; Formats: Digital download	—
iTunes Session	Released: May 1, 2012; Label: Atlantic; Formats: Digital download	43
Neon Lightz	Released: March 31, 2023; Label: B.o.B. music; Formats: Digital download, streaming	—

== Mixtapes ==
List of mixtapes, with selected chart positions
Title	Album details	Peak chart positions		
Title	Album details	US	US R&B/ HH	US Rap
The Future	Released: June 13, 2007; Label: Self-released; Format: Digital download	—	—	—
Cloud 9	Released: December 25, 2007; Label: Self-released; Format: Digital download	—	—	—
Hi! My Name is B.o.B	Released: February 17, 2008; Label: Self-released; Format: Digital download	—	—	—
Who the F#*k is B.o.B?	Released: November 16, 2008; Label: Grand Hustle Records; Format: Digital download	—	—	—
B.o.B vs. Bobby Ray	Released: June 22, 2009; Label: Grand Hustle Records; Format: Digital download	—	—	—
May 25	Released: February 1, 2010; Label: Grand Hustle Records; Format: Digital download	—	—	—
No Genre	Released: December 7, 2010; Label: Grand Hustle Records; Format: Digital download	—	—	—
E.P.I.C. (Every Play Is Crucial)	Released: November 28, 2011; Label: Grand Hustle Records; Format: Digital download	—	—	—
Fuck 'Em We Ball	Released: November 15, 2012; Label: Grand Hustle Records; Format: Digital download	—	—	—
G.D.O.D. (Get Dough Or Die) (with Hustle Gang)	Released: May 7, 2013; Label: Grand Hustle Records; Format: Digital download	—	—	—
No Genre Pt. 2	Released: July 9, 2014; Label: Grand Hustle Records; Format: Digital download	—	—	—
G.D.O.D. II (with Hustle Gang)	Released: September 19, 2014; Label: Grand Hustle Records; Format: Digital download	—	—	—
New Black	Released: November 27, 2014; Label: Grand Hustle Records; Format: Digital download	—	—	—
No Genre: The Label (with No Genre)	Released: January 3, 2015; Label: Grand Hustle Records, No Genre; Format: Digital download	—	—	—
Psycadelik Thoughtz	Released: August 14, 2015; Label: Grand Hustle Records, Atlantic; Format: Digital download	97	10	7
NASA (with London Jae)	Released: November 23, 2015; Label: Grand Hustle Records, No Genre; Format: Digital download	—	—	—
WATER	Released: December 4, 2015; Label: Self-released; Format: Digital download	—	—	—
FIRE	Released: January 18, 2016; Label: Self-released; Format: Digital download	—	—	—
Live & Direct (with Scotty ATL)	Released: March 1, 2016; Label: No Genre; Format: Digital download	—	—	—
EARTH	Released: April 22, 2016; Label: Self-released; Format: Digital download	—	—	—
AIR	Released: August 29, 2016; Label: Self-released; Format: Digital download	—	—	—
The Upside Down	Released: November 14, 2017; Label: Bobby Ray Simmons; Formats: Digital download	—	—	—
Southmatic	Released: June 21, 2019; Label: No Genre, The Dipensary; Formats: Digital download	—	—	—
Murd and Mercy	Released: October 30, 2020; Label: Bobby Ray Music; Formats: Cassette	—	—	—
Murd & Mercy (Deluxe)	Released: October 29, 2021; Label: Bobby Ray Music, Empire; Formats: Digital download	—	—	—
Artificial Intelligence (Elements 2)	Released: March 9, 2022; Label: Self-released; Formats: Digital download	—	—	—

== Singles ==
=== As lead artist ===
List of singles as lead artist, with selected chart positions and certifications, showing year released and album name
Title	Year	Peak chart positions										Certifications	Album
Title	Year	US	US R&B	US Rap	AUS	CAN	GER	IRL	NZ	SWI	UK	Certifications	Album
"I'll Be in the Sky"	2008	—	—^{[A]}	—	—	—	—	24	—	—	61		B.o.B Presents: The Adventures of Bobby Ray
"Nothin' on You" (featuring Bruno Mars)	2009	1	5	1	3	10	22	7	5	28	1	RIAA: 6× Platinum; ARIA: Platinum; MC: Platinum; BPI: Platinum; RMNZ: 2× Platinum	B.o.B Presents: The Adventures of Bobby Ray
"Don't Let Me Fall"	2010	67	—	—	—	62	—	—	—	—	—	RIAA: Gold	B.o.B Presents: The Adventures of Bobby Ray
"Airplanes" (featuring Hayley Williams)	2010	2	65	2	2	2	8	2	1	5	1	RIAA: Diamond; ARIA: 3× Platinum; BVMI: 2× Platinum; MC: 3× Platinum; BPI: 3× Platinum; RMNZ: 4× Platinum	B.o.B Presents: The Adventures of Bobby Ray
"Bet I" (featuring T.I. and Playboy Tre)	2010	72	60	—	—	—	—	—	—	—	—		B.o.B Presents: The Adventures of Bobby Ray
"Magic" (featuring Rivers Cuomo)	2010	10	—	25	5	17	—	16	6	—	16	RIAA: 3× Platinum; ARIA: 2× Platinum; MC: Platinum; BPI: Gold; RMNZ: Gold	B.o.B Presents: The Adventures of Bobby Ray
"Strange Clouds" (featuring Lil Wayne)	2011	7	43	16	63	26	—	—	39	47	72	RIAA: 2× Platinum	Strange Clouds
"Play the Guitar" (featuring André 3000)	2011	98	—^{[D]}	—	—	—	—	—	—	—	—		non-album single
"So Good"	2012	11	92	20	9	20	65	9	15	48	7	RIAA: 2× Platinum; ARIA: Platinum; BPI: Gold; MC: Gold; RMNZ: Platinum	Strange Clouds
"Both of Us" (featuring Taylor Swift)	2012	18	—	—	5	23	—	26	10	—	22	RIAA: Platinum; ARIA: Platinum; RMNZ: Platinum	Strange Clouds
"Out of My Mind" (featuring Nicki Minaj)	2012	—	—	—	—	—	—	—	—	—	197	RIAA: Gold	Strange Clouds
"We Still in This Bitch" (featuring T.I. and Juicy J)	2013	64	19	14	—	72	—	—	—	—	—	RIAA: Platinum	Underground Luxury
"HeadBand" (featuring 2 Chainz)	2013	53	16	10	—	67	57	—	—	—	—	RIAA: 4× Platinum; RMNZ: Platinum	Underground Luxury
"Ready" (featuring Future)	2013	—	37	—	—	—	—	—	—	—	—		Underground Luxury
"John Doe" (featuring Priscilla)	2013	69	18	10	—	—	—	—	—	—	—		Underground Luxury
"Not for Long" (featuring Trey Songz)	2014	80	26	18	—	—	—	—	—	—	—		Non-album singles
"Roll Up" (featuring Marko Penn)	2016	—	—	—	—	—	—	—	—	—	—		Non-album singles
"4 Lit" (featuring T.I. and Ty Dolla $ign)	2016	—	—^{[I]}	—	—	—	—	—	—	—	—		Ether
"Cuello"	2018	—	—	—	—	—	—	—	—	—	—		Naga
"Gerald LeVert"	2018	—	—	—	—	—	—	—	—	—	—		Naga
"The Elephant"	2019	—	—	—	—	—	—	—	—	—	—		Southmatic
"Slizzy Sity"	2020	—	—	—	—	—	—	—	—	—	—		Somnia
"After Hourzzz"	2020	—	—	—	—	—	—	—	—	—	—		Somnia
"Bad Lil Bish" (featuring Baby Tate & Black Boe)	2022	—	—	—	—	—	—	—	—	—	—		Better Than Drugs
"Vimana"	2022	—	—	—	—	—	—	—	—	—	—		
"Blue"	2022	—	—	—	—	—	—	—	—	—	—		
"—" denotes a recording that did not chart or was not released in that territory.

=== As featured artist ===
List of singles as featured artist, with selected chart positions and certifications, showing year released and album name
Title	Year	Peak chart positions										Certifications	Album
Title	Year	US	US R&B	US Rap	AUS	CAN	GER	IRL	NZ	SWI	UK	Certifications	Album
"Hood Dreamer" (Willy Northpole featuring B.o.B)	2009	—	—	—	—	—	—	—	—	—	—		Tha Connect
"Don't Go There" (Giggs featuring B.o.B)	2010	—	—	—	—	—	—	—	—	—	60		Let Em Ave It
"They Call This (Hip Hop)" (Classified featuring Royce da 5'9" and B.o.B)	2010	—	—	—	—	—	—	—	—	—	—		Self Explanatory
"Paperboy" (Charles Hamilton featuring B.o.B)	2010	—	—	—	—	—	—	—	—	—	—		Non-album single
"So High" (Slim Thug featuring B.o.B)	2010	—^{[B]}	35	19	—	—	—	—	—	—	—		Tha Thug Show
"Price Tag" (Jessie J featuring B.o.B)	2011	23	—^{[C]}	—	2	4	3	1	1	8	1	RIAA: 4× Platinum; ARIA: 8× Platinum; BPI: 3× Platinum; BVMI: Platinum; IFPI SWI: Gold; RIANZ: 4× Platinum	Who You Are
"We Don't Get Down Like Y'all" (T.I. featuring B.o.B)	2011	78	—	—	—	—	—	—	—	—	—		Non-album single
"Am I a Psycho?" (Tech N9ne featuring B.o.B and Hopsin)	2012	—	—	—	—	—	—	—	—	—	—	RIAA: Platinum; RMNZ: Gold	All 6's and 7's
"Smart Girl" (Tex James featuring B.o.B and Stuey Rock)	2012	—	—	—	—	—	—	—	—	—	—		Lookin for the Twerkers
"Memories Back Then" (T.I. featuring B.o.B, Kendrick Lamar and Kris Stephens)	2013	88	30	—	—	—	—	—	—	—	—		Non-album single
"Brokenhearted" (Lawson featuring B.o.B)	2013	—	—	—	—	—	—	12	—	—	5		Chapman Square Repackaged
"Up Down (Do This All Day)" (T-Pain featuring B.o.B)	2013	62	15	—	—	—	—	—	—	—	50	RIAA: Platinum; BPI: Silver; RMNZ: 3× Platinum	T-Pain Presents Happy Hour: The Greatest Hits
"It's the Weekend" (Netta Brielle featuring B.o.B)	2013	—	—	—	—	—	—	—	—	—	—		Will You Go With Me?
"Paranoid" (Ty Dolla $ign featuring B.o.B)	2013	29	9	—	—	—	—	—	—	—	—	RIAA: Platinum; BPI: Silver; RMNZ: Gold	Beach House EP
"Magic Number" (The Potbelleez featuring B.o.B)	2013	—	—	—	—	—	—	—	—	—	—		Non-album single
"Numb" (August Alsina featuring B.o.B and Yo Gotti)	2013	122	38	—	—	—	—	—	—	—	—	RIAA: Gold	Testimony
"Higher" (Classified featuring B.o.B)	2014	—	—	—	—	31	—	—	—	—	—	MC: Gold	Non-album singles
"Never Sleep to Dream" (Davidmichael featuring B.o.B and Marian Mereba)	2014	—	—	—	—	—	—	—	—	—	—		Non-album singles
"Chosen" (Hustle Gang featuring T.I., B.o.B and Spodee)	2014	—	56	—	—	—	—	—	—	—	—		Non-album singles
"Music Saved My Life" (Joell Ortiz featuring B.o.B and Mally Stakz)	2014	—	—	—	—	—	—	—	—	—	—		House Slippers
"Red Cup" (E-40 featuring T-Pain, Kid Ink and B.o.B)	2014	—	—	—	—	—	—	—	—	—	—		Sharp On All 4 Corners: Corner 1
"Secrets" (Mary Lambert featuring B.o.B)	2014	66	—	—	39	—	—	—	40	—	—		Heart on My Sleeve
"Ain't Goin Nowehere" (Frenchie featuring B.o.B and Chanel West Coast)	2014	—	—	—	—	—	—	—	—	—	—		Non-album single
"Nobody Wins" (Jodeci featuring B.o.B)	2014	—	—	—	—	—	—	—	—	—	—		The Past, The Present, The Future
"Hood Go Crazy" (Tech N9ne featuring 2 Chainz and B.o.B)	2015	90	28	17	—	—	—	—	—	—	—	RIAA: Platinum; RMNZ: Gold	Special Effects
"Beast in da Sheets" (Ray J featuring B.o.B)	2015	—	—	—	—	—	—	—	—	—	—		Non-album single
"Shoulda Been There" (Sevyn Streeter featuring B.o.B)	2015	—	—	—	—	—	—	—	—	—	—		Shoulda Been There Pt. 1
"Devil" (Cash Cash featuring Busta Rhymes, B.o.B and Neon Hitch)	2015	—	—	—	—	—	—	—	—	—	110		Blood, Sweat & 3 Years
"I Am Somebody" (DJ Greg Street featuring Akon, B.o.B and Big K.R.I.T.)	2016	—	—	—	—	—	—	—	—	—	—		Non-album singles
"The Devil Made Me Do It" (Skylar Grey featuring B.o.B)	2020	—	—	—	—	—	—	—	—	—	—		Non-album singles
"—" denotes a recording that did not chart or was not released in that territory.

=== Promotional singles ===
List of promotional singles, with selected chart positions, showing year released and album name
Title	Year	Peak chart positions					Certifications	Album
Title	Year	US	US R&B	AUS	CAN	NL	Certifications	Album
"Haterz Everywhere" (featuring Wes Fif)	2007	—	89	—	—	—		Eastside
"Teach Me How to Dougie" (Pop Remix) (Cali Swag District featuring Sean Kingston and B.o.B)	2010	—	—	—	—	—		non-album single
"Teach Me How to Dougie" (Urban Remix) (Cali Swag District featuring Jermaine Dupri, B.o.B, Red Café and Bow Wow)	2010	—	—	—	—	—		non-album single
"The One That Got Away" (Remix) (Katy Perry featuring B.o.B)	2011	—	—	—	—	—		non-album single
"Blow" (Remix) (Kesha featuring B.o.B)	2011	—	—	—	—	—		non-album single
"Good Life" (Remix) (OneRepublic featuring B.o.B)	2011	—	—	68	—	25	ARIA: 2× Platinum	non-album single
"Get Down" (Chris Brown featuring B.o.B)	2012	—	—	—	—	—		non-album single
"Bandz a Make Her Dance" (Remix) (Juicy J featuring French Montana, Lola Monroe, Wiz Khalifa and B.o.B)	2012	—	—	—	—	—		non-album single
"The Biggest Mistake" (Remix) (The Secret State featuring Akon and B.o.B)	2013	—	—	—	—	—		non-album single
"Body Party" (Remix) (Ciara featuring Future and B.o.B)	2013	—	—	—	—	—		Ciara
"All Night Longer" (Remix) (Sammy Adams featuring B.o.B)	2014	—	—	—	—	—		Non-album singles
"Mind Right" (Remix) (TK-N-Cash featuring B.o.B)	2015	—	—	—	—	—		Non-album singles
"Back and Forth"	2015	—	—	—	—	—		Psycadelik Thoughtz
"Xantastic" (featuring Young Thug)	2017	—	—	—	—	—		Ether
"—" denotes a recording that did not chart or was not released in that territory.

== Other charted songs ==
List of songs, with selected chart positions, certifications, showing year released and album name
Title	Year	Peak chart positions				Certifications	Album
Title	Year	US	US R&B	AUS	UK	Certifications	Album
"The Other Side" (Bruno Mars featuring Cee Lo Green and B.o.B)	2010	—	—	—	117	RIAA: Gold	It's Better If You Don't Understand
"Beast Mode"	2011	—	—^{[G]}	—	—		No Genre
"Arena" (featuring Chris Brown and T.I.)	2012	—^{[H]}	—	36	—	ARIA: Gold	Strange Clouds
"Ray Bands"	2012	—	93	—	—		Strange Clouds
"Castles" (featuring Trey Songz)	2012	—	—	55	—		Strange Clouds
"Pledge of Allegiance" (DJ Drama featuring Wiz Khalifa, Planet VI and B.o.B)	2013	—	48	—	—		Quality Street Music
"—" denotes a recording that did not chart or was not released in that territory.

== Guest appearances ==
List of non-single guest appearances, with other performing artists, showing year released and album name
Title	Year	Other artist(s)	Album
"3-6-9"	2007	Cupid	Time for a Change
"Hot"	2007	V.I.C., Stan Williams	none
"Bean Pop" (Remix)	2007	KP	none
"Nite Life"	2007	Playboy Tre	Da Return of Feel Good Musiq
"On Top of the World"	2008	T.I., Ludacris	Paper Trail
"Run"	2008	Yelawolf, Shawtty Fatt	Ball of Flames: Slick Rick E. Bobby
"My Ride (Double Bubble)"	2008	Stat Quo	none
"So Sticky"	2008	Swagg	none
"You Already Know"	2008	Young Cash	none
"Do It Slow"	2009	Rock City	PTFAO: Independence Day
"Living At the Speed of Light "	2009	Meek Mill	Flamers 2: Hottest in tha City
"Generation Lost"	2009	none	Underground Atlanta
"The World Will Never Do"	2009	Cobra Starship	Hot Mess
"Across the World"	2009	Pitbull	Rebelution
"We Are the Robots"	2009	Playboy Tre	Liquor Store Mascot
"Stronger"	2009	Playboy Tre, Swagg	none
"Mind Got Blown"	2009	Mickey Factz	NBA Live 10 soundtrack
"I Just Wanna"	2009	Shonie	Passionate...Pieces of Me
"Speed of Life"	2009	Trife Diesel, Inspectah Deck	Tapemasters Inc Present Trife Diesel: The Project Pope Mixtape
"Before She Said Hi" (Remix)	2009	Mario	none
"The Other Side"	2010	Bruno Mars, Cee Lo Green	It's Better If You Don't Understand
"Night Night"	2010	Big Boi, Joi	Sir Lucious Left Foot: The Son of Chico Dusty
"Know Her Name"	2010	Mullage	none
"Dream Me Up"	2010	Question?, EZ Lee	none
"Tightrope" (Wondamix)	2010	Janelle Monáe, Lupe Fiasco	none
"The Fire" (Remix)	2010	The Roots, John Legend	none
"Another Round" (J. Cardim Remix)	2010	J the S	none
"Let’cha Boy Go"	2010	4-Ize	Professional Ignorant
"Bad (That's Her)" (Remix)	2010	Lil Scrappy, Roscoe Dash	none
"I'm Beamin" (Remix)	2010	Asher Roth, Blu, Charles Hamilton, The Cool Kids, Diggy, Dosage, Lupe Fiasco	none
"Sanford and Son"	2010	Quincy Jones, T.I., Mohombi, Prince Charlez	Q: Soul Bossa Nostra
"Tell No Lies"	2010	Emilio Rojas, Leo	Life Without Shame
"Walk Away" (Remix)	2011	The Script	Science & Faith
"Make It Rain" (Remix)	2011	Travis Porter	none
"Pass Me By"	2011	J. Cole	none
"Lay It Down" (Remix)	2011	Lloyd, Rock City	none
"Hope Is a River"	2011	Sean Kingston	King of Kingz
"Speed of Light"	2011	OJ da Juiceman	Cook Muzik
"Who Are You Now"	2011	Lupe Fiasco	none
"Alligator Sky"	2011	Owl City	none
"Racks" (Remix)	2011	YC, Young Jeezy, Wiz Khalifa, Waka Flocka Flame, CyHi the Prynce, Bun B, Twista, Big Sean, Cory Mo, Cory Gunz, Nelly, Ace Hood, Trae tha Truth, Wale, Yo Gotti	none
"It's a Party"	2011	Yelawolf	none
"Stadium"	2011	CyHi the Prynce	Royal Flush II
"My Life"	2011	DJ Khaled, Akon	We the Best Forever
"Get Mama a House" (Remix)	2011	Teddybears	none
"First Class"	2011	Wale, Big Sean	none
"Feet Don't Fail Me Now"	2011	Spodee, Mitchelle'l, T.I.	No Pressure
"Sunlight"	2011	Spodee, Mitchelle’l	No Pressure
"Standin' on a Corner"	2011	Game, Wiz Khalifa	Hoodmorning (No Typo): Candy Coronas
"Take My City"	2011	DJ Drama, Crooked I	Third Power
"Piss'n on Your Ego"	2012	T.I.	Fuck da City Up
"Man on the Moon"	2012	Gorilla Zoe	Gorilla Zoe World
"Change the Record"	2012	Melanie Fiona	The MF Life
"Oh My!"	2012	Haley Reinhart	Listen Up!
"AaaHH! Real Monsters"	2012	XV, Schoolboy Q	Popular Culture
"Fist Pump"	2012	Waka Flocka Flame	Triple F Life: Fans, Friends & Family
"On a Roll"	2012	Playboy Tre	Liquor Store Mascot 2: Patron & Instrumentals
"A-Town"	2012	CyHi the Prynce, Travis Porter	Ivy League Club
"Millionaire Misfits"	2012	Iggy Azalea	Glory
"I'm On 2.0"	2012	Trae tha Truth, Mark Morrison, Big K.R.I.T., Jadakiss, Kendrick Lamar, J. Cole, Tyga, Gudda Gudda, Bun B	Tha Blackprint
"Place to Be"	2012	Slaughterhouse	Welcome to: Our House
"Pledge of Allegiance"	2012	DJ Drama, Wiz Khalifa, Planet VI	Quality Street Music
"MJ"	2012	Nelly	Scorpio Season
"Another Round" (Remix)	2012	Slice 9, Future, Young Dro	none
"Watch You Shine"	2012	Haitian Fresh, Wyclef Jean	none
"Shoes for Running"	2012	Big Boi, Wavves	Vicious Lies and Dangerous Rumors
"Dumb"	2012	Chip	London Boy
"A-Town" (Remix)	2013	CyHi the Prynce, 2 Chainz, Travis Porter	Ivy League: Kick Back
"Exclusive"	2013	Cash Out	Patience
"Double or Nothing"	2013	Big Boi	none
"Flexed Up"	2013	Funkmaster Flex	Who You Mad At? Me or Yourself?
"Err-Body"	2013	T.I., Young Dro, Trae Tha Truth, Chip, Shad da God	G.D.O.D. (Get Dough or Die)
"2 Fucks"	2013	T.I., Chip, Travis Scott, Trae tha Truth, Young Dro	G.D.O.D. (Get Dough or Die)
"Poppin for Some"	2013	Young Dro, Yung Booke	G.D.O.D. (Get Dough or Die)
"Kemosabe"	2013	Doe B, Young Dro, T.I.	G.D.O.D. (Get Dough or Die)
"Problems"	2013	T.I., Mac Boney, Problem, Trae tha Truth, Young Dro	G.D.O.D. (Get Dough or Die)
"Yeap!"	2013	T.I., Young Dro	G.D.O.D. (Get Dough or Die)
"Different Life"	2013	T.I., Young Dro	G.D.O.D. (Get Dough or Die)
"Animal"	2013	Travis Scott, T.I.	G.D.O.D. (Get Dough or Die)
"Round of Applause" (Remix)	2013	Lecrae	Church Clothes 2
"Hooligans"	2013	Young Dro, Trae tha Truth	Day Two
"Groupie"	2013	Young Dro, Trinidad James	Day Two
"Hockey Bag"	2013	Doe B	Baby Jesus
"See Me"	2013	Tech N9ne, Wiz Khalifa	Something Else
"Colorado"	2013	Tech N9ne, Ces Cru, Krizz Kaliko, ¡Mayday!, Rittz, Stevie Stone	Something Else
"Young Nigga" (Remix)	2013	Que, Migos, Juicy J	none
"Creez"	2013	Ty Dolla $ign, Kid Ink	Beach House 2
"FDB" (Remix)	2013	Young Dro, Wale, Chief Keef	none
"Drop It" (Remix)	2013	Trevor Jackson	none
"Ugly Truth"	2013	Trae tha Truth	I Am King
"Mama Said"	2013	Diggy, Key Wane	none
"Rio Rio"	2014	Ester Dean	Rio 2 soundtrack
"Ride This Beat"	2014	Keke Palmer	none
"Turn Up the Night"	2014	K Camp	In Due Time
"Sex You" (Remix)	2014	Bando Jonez, Twista, T-Pain	none
"Real Niggas Only"	2014	Doe B, T.I.	G.D.O.D. II
"Champagne Room"	2014	Trey Songz, T.I., Big Kuntry King, Spodee	G.D.O.D. II
"I Don't Fuck wit You"	2014	T.I., Spodee, Yung Booke, Shad da God, Big Kuntry King	G.D.O.D. II
"Troubled"	2014	Watch The Duck, T.I., Dro	G.D.O.D. II
"In My Zone"	2014	Rittz, Mike Posner	Next to Nothing
"For the Thrill"	2014	Victoria Monet	Nightmares & Lullabies Act 1
"Champion"	2014	Mila J	M.I.L.A.
"Jealous" (Remix)	2015	Nick Jonas	none
"Mind Right" (Remix)	2015	TK-N-Cash, T-Pain, T.I.	none
"Hood Go Crazy"	2015	Tech N9ne, 2 Chainz	Special Effects
"Slip Slide"	2015	Donnie Trumpet & The Social Experiment, BJ the Chicago Kid, Busta Rhymes, Janelle Monáe	Surf
"Work From Home"	2015	Jordin Sparks	Right Here, Right Now
"Let Me Live"	2016	Trae tha Truth, T.I., Ink	Tha Truth, Pt. 2
"Backseat"	2016	Mistah F.A.B., Tech N9ne	Son of a Pimp, Pt. 2
"I Just Might"	2016	Philthy Rich, London Jae, Cool Amerika	Hood Rich 4
"Writer"	2016	T.I., Translee	Us or Else: Letter to the System
"Dat Way"	2016	Peanut da Don	Back on Simpson 2
"And-a-Um"	2017	Mistah F.A.B.	Stan Pablo: 4506
"Get High"	2017	London Jae	Ambition
"What I Been Thru"	2018	London Jae, T.I.	Gunz & Roses
"Godzilla"	2018	Jarren Benton, Oba Rowland	Yuck Fou
"Generation WTF"	2018	Translee, GFMBryyce	Freedom Summer
"Fold Dat Sack"	2021	Scotty ATL	Trappin Gold

== Music videos ==
=== As lead artist ===
List of music videos, showing year released and director
Title	Year	Director(s)
"Haterz Everywhere" (featuring Rich Boy)	2008	none
"I'll Be in the Sky"	2009	Gabriel Hart
"Lonely People"	2009	Issac Klotz
"Generation Lost"	2009	James Lopez
"No Mans Land"	2009	Motion Family
"Put Me On"	2009	Issac Klotz
"Nothin' on You" (featuring Bruno Mars)	2010	Ethan Lader
"Bet I" (featuring T.I. and Playboy Tre)	2010	Gabriel Hart
"Airplanes" (featuring Hayley Williams)	2010	Hiro Murai
"Don't Let Me Fall"	2010	Ethan Lader
"Magic" (featuring Rivers Cuomo)	2010	Sanaa Hamri
"Can I Fly?"	2010	none
"Beast Mode"	2010	Motion Family
"The Watchers"	2010	Motion Family
"Dr. Aden"	2011	Issac Klotz
"High Life"	2011	Motion Family
"Epic" (featuring Playboy Tre and Meek Mill)	2011	Motion Family
"Fucked Up" (featuring Playboy Tre)	2011	Motion Family
"Strange Clouds" (featuring Lil Wayne)	2011	Motion Family
"How Bout Dat" (featuring Future and Trae Tha Truth)	2012	Gabriel Hart
"Strange Clouds" (Remix) (featuring T.I. and Young Jeezy)	2012	1st Impressions
"So Good"	2012	Justin Francis
"Play for Keeps"	2012	Motion Family
"Ray Bands"	2012	1st Impressions
"Both of Us" (featuring Taylor Swift)	2012	Jake Nava
"Play the Guitar" (featuring Andre 3000)	2012	none
"Out of My Mind" (featuring Nicki Minaj)	2012	Benny Boom
"Just a Sign" (featuring Playboy Tre)	2012	Motion Family
"We Still in This Bitch" (featuring T.I. and Juicy J)	2013	Decatur Dan
"Double or Nothing" (with Big Boi)	2013	Vice, Noisey, EA
"Through My Head"	2013	Ricardo de Montreuil
"Chandelier" (with Lauriana Mae)	2013	none
"Poppin 4 Sum" (with Young Dro and Yung Booke)	2013	1st Impressions
"HeadBand" (featuring 2 Chainz)	2013	Ryan Patrick
"Problems" (with T.I., Problem and Trae tha Truth)	2013	Philly Fly Boy
"Kemosabe" (with T.I., Doe B, Birdman and Young Dro)	2013	T.I. and Philly Fly Boy
"Ready" (featuring Future)	2013	Mike Ho
"Paper Route"	2013	Benmark
"John Doe" (featuring Priscilla)	2014	K. Asher Levin
"Chosen" (with T.I. and Spodee)	2014	Philly Fly Boy
"Mission Statement"	2014	Nick May
"Many Rivers"	2014	1st Impressions
"Drunk AF" (featuring Ty Dolla Sign)	2014	Philly Fly Boy
"So What" (featuring Mila J)	2014	Isaac Klotz
"The Nation" (featuring Jake Lambo)	2014	1st Impressions
"Get Right" (featuring Mike Fresh)	2014	Philly Fly Boy
"Lambo" (featuring Kevin Gates and Jake Lambo)	2014	SameDNATV
"Lean on Me" (featuring Victoria Monet)	2014	none
"Forget"	2014	Philly Fly Boy
"Not For Long" (featuring Trey Songz)	2014	Jerome D.
"I Don't Fuck wit You" (with T.I., Spodee, Yung Booke, Shad da God and Big Kuntry King)	2015	none
"War Witch"	2016	none

=== As featured artist ===
List of music videos, showing year released and director
Title	Year	Director(s)
"Hood Dreamer" (Willy Northpole featuring B.o.B)	2009	TAJ Stansberry
"Don't Go There" (Giggs featuring B.o.B)	2010	Adam Powell
"So High" (Slim Thug featuring B.o.B)	2010	Parris
"Tightrope" (Wondamix) (Janelle Monáe featuring B.o.B and Lupe Fiasco)	2010	Wendy Morgan
"Teach Me How to Dougie" (Remix) (Cali Swag District featuring Jermaine Dupri, B.o.B, Red Cafe and Bow Wow)	2010	none
"Price Tag" (Jessie J featuring B.o.B)	2011	Emil Nava
"Sunlight" (Spodee featuring B.o.B and Mitchelle’l)	2011	TheLifeAsAlex
"Racks" (Remix) (YC featuring Nelly, B.o.B, Trae, Yo Gotti, Cyhi the Prynce, Dose and Ace Hood)	2011	Ian Wolfson
"Am I a Psycho" (Tech N9ne featuring B.o.B and Hopsin)	2012	Dan Gedman
"I'm On 2.0" (Trae tha Truth featuring Big K.R.I.T., Jadakiss, J. Cole, Kendrick Lamar, B.o.B., Tyga, Gudda Gudda, Bun B and Mark Morrison)	2012	Philly Fly Boy
"Fist Pump" (Waka Flocka Flame featuring B.o.B)	2012	Blind Folks
"Smart Girl" (Tex James featuring B.o.B and Stuey Rock)	2012	Decatur Dan
"Change the Record" (Melanie Fiona featuring B.o.B)	2012	Rome and Vinit Borrison
"Exclusive" (Cash Out featuring B.o.B)	2013	Mr. Boomtown
"Memories Back Then" (T.I. featuring B.o.B, Kendrick Lamar and Kris Stephens)	2013	Philly Fly Boy
"Brokenhearted" (Lawson featuring B.o.B)	2013	Declan Whitebloom
"Paranoid" (Ty Dolla Sign featuring B.o.B)	2013	Ethan Lader
"Up Down (Do This All Day)" (T-Pain featuring B.o.B)	2013	G Visuals
"Numb" (August Alsina featuring B.o.B and Yo Gotti)	2013	Payne Lindsey
"Higher" (Classified featuring B.o.B)	2014	RT!
"Sex You" (Remix) (Bando Jonez featuring T-Pain and B.o.B)	2014	Cricket
"Music Saved My Life" (Joell Ortiz featuring B.o.B and Mally Stakz)	2014	RRAW Films
"Champion" (Mila J featuring B.o.B)	2015	Decatur Dan
"Sledge Hammer" (No Genre featuring Havi, Roxxanne Montana, London Jae, Jaque Beatz and B.o.B)	2016	none

== See also ==
- B.o.B production discography

== Notes ==
- A "I'll Be in the Sky" did not enter the Hot R&B/Hip-Hop Songs chart, but peaked at number 5 on the Bubbling Under Hot R&B/Hip-Hop Singles chart.
- B "So High" did not enter the Billboard Hot 100, but peaked at number 25 on the Bubbling Under Hot 100 Singles chart.
- C "Price Tag" did not enter the Hot R&B/Hip-Hop Songs chart, but peaked at number 1 on the Bubbling Under R&B/Hip-Hop Singles chart.
- D "Play the Guitar" did not enter the Hot R&B/Hip-Hop Songs chart, but peaked at number 13 on the Bubbling Under Hot R&B/Hip-Hop Singles chart.
- E "Where Are You (B.o.B vs. Bobby Ray)" did not enter the Billboard Hot 100, but peaked at number 1 on the Bubbling Under Hot 100 Singles chart.
- F "So Hard to Breathe" did not enter the Billboard Hot 100, but peaked at number 1 on the Bubbling Under Hot 100 Singles chart.
- G "Beast Mode" did not enter the Hot R&B/Hip-Hop Songs chart, but peaked at number 20 on the Bubbling Under Hot R&B/Hip-Hop Singles chart.
- H "Arena" did not enter the Billboard Hot 100, but peaked at number 16 on the Bubbling Under Hot 100 Singles chart.
- I "4 Lit" did not enter the Hot R&B/Hip-Hop Songs chart, but peaked at number 32 on the Mainstream R&B/Hip Hop chart.
