= Underground Luxury =

Studio album by B.o.B
- Released: December 17, 2013
- Recorded: 2012–2013
- Genres: Hip-hop; dirty south
- Length: 57:08
- Labels: Rebel Rock; Grand Hustle; Atlantic
- Producers: B.o.B (also exec.); Arthur McArthur; Big Zar; DJ Mustard; DJ Toomp; Finatik N Zac; FKi; Geoffro Cause; Jim Jonsin; Detail; Marz; Mike Will Made It; Rock City; soFLY and Nius

B.o.B chronology
Strange Clouds (2012)	Underground Luxury (2013)	Psycadelik Thoughtz (2015)

Singles from Underground Luxury
- 1. "We Still in This Bitch" Released: January 8, 2013; 2. "HeadBand" Released: May 21, 2013; 3. "Ready" Released: September 10, 2013; 4. "John Doe" Released: December 3, 2013

Underground Luxury is the third studio album by American rapper B.o.B. The album was released on December 17, 2013, by Grand Hustle Records, Rebel Rock Entertainment and Atlantic Records. The album was produced by B.o.B himself, alongside Rebel Rock founder Jim Jonsin, Arthur McArthur, Big Zar, DJ Mustard, DJ Toomp, FnZ, FKi 1st, Geoffro Cause, Detail, Marz, Mike Will Made It, R. City, and SoFly and Nius. The album also features guest appearances from Grand Hustle founder T.I., alongside Future, Chris Brown, Ester Dean, 2 Chainz, Muni Long (as Priscilla), Playboy Tre, and Three 6 Mafia member Juicy J.

The album was supported by four singles. The first, "We Still in This Bitch" (featuring T.I. and Juicy J), charted at number 64 on the Billboard Hot 100. The second single, "HeadBand" (featuring 2 Chainz), became the highest charting single from the project, peaking at number 53. "Ready" (featuring Future) and "John Doe" (featuring Priscilla) were released as the third and fourth singles respectively, with the latter charting at number 69 on the Billboard Hot 100.

Underground Luxury received mixed reviews from music critics, who praised some of its production, but criticized its lyricism and the rapper's decision to move from the alternative hip-hop sound of his previous efforts, into a club-dirty south one. The album debuted at number 22 on the Billboard 200 chart, selling 35,000 copies in its first week of release and becoming B.o.B's lowest charting entry on the Billboard 200, until the mixtape Psycadelik Thoughtz (2015). The album also charted within the top 10 of the Top R&B/Hip-Hop Albums and Top Rap Albums charts, peaking at number 7 and number 3 respectively. The album was also certified Gold by the Recording Industry Association of America (RIAA) on August 5, 2016.

== Background ==
On December 7, 2012, during an interview with MTV News, B.o.B spoke about his third studio album, saying: "My album is basically a continuation of The Adventures of Bobby Ray and Strange Clouds. I feel like it kinda bridges the gap between where all my fans are and finally getting everybody up to speed on what my sound is and exactly where I’m going." In March 2013, during an interview with Rap-Up, he spoke about his third studio album being more effortless, saying: "This project is a lot more effortless than anything because I’ve really shown the full spectrum of what I can do musically, so now I’m just having fun with it. I’m 24 years old, so I’m partying." On April 4, 2013, B.o.B revealed he would release his third studio album before the rock EP he had previously announced. On May 12, 2013, 2013, B.o.B tweeted: "Underground Luxury ... coming this summer... #staytuned", revealing the title of his third studio album. On May 23, 2013, during an interview with Power 105, B.o.B spoke about the album being the edgiest project he has ever done, saying:

"A lot of people didn't get to see the full spectrum of what I do. So it's kinda like a re-introduction of my roots. My album coming out this summer, Underground Luxury, is really telling the story from...I grew up with very humble beginnings. Underground Luxury is definitely a lot edgier. Probably the most edgy of any project I've done. And I mean that on all levels from the cerebral tracks to the club tracks, to everything. The whole side of it, I'm just really being blunt with my thoughts I'm not holding anything back."

In September 2013, during an interview with Montreality, B.o.B announced that the album would be released in December 2013. In the same interview he spoke about the plans for Underground Luxury, saying: "I want to say that this project is a project that is kind of like a contrasting title, you know, Underground Luxury. I would say, to paraphrase it, this is connecting the dots, from who I was as an artist before the major success to where I'm at now. And it's a lot more unfiltered and unedited than anything I've ever done. So I think it's going to be a great project, great, monumental, career shifting project. I'm actually done with it, but we're really just having fun with it, man. We're making a movie, you know, me and my team. We're just kind of sitting back and watching everything, watching how people respond to music." In October 2013, during an interview with Rolling Stone he spoke about the album title, saying:

"To me, "underground luxury" is kinda like a contrasting title and the reason for that is because on this album I plan on introducing to people and reintroducing to people the side of me that they didn't see on the first album. On that album, I didn't really show my underground side and I didn't really tell my story as much and as vividly as I'm telling it now. Telling a story isn't always a linear thing that involves going from point A to point B -- it's about putting myself back in a mind state to when I was struggling and when I had to really go out of my way to make ends meet when I was coming out of high school and really struggling. It's really like a re-telling of the story from a different perspective."

== Recording and production ==
On December 10, 2012, B.o.B revealed he would be releasing an extended play that consisted only of rock music; he also spoke lightly on his third studio album as well: "I think it’s really gonna be a phenomenal album simply because I’ve been recording it for so long. When you record 10 songs to get seven good songs and then you record twice as many to get a hit, so when you just spend time with the music, it’s inevitable." In March 2013, while on set for T.I.’s “Memories Back Then” video-shoot, B.o.B gave insight on his third studio album for the second time and promised progression: "Musically really I think it’s what you would expect from the whole scope of a B.o.B project, but just more refined. As time goes on I’m getting older, but at the same time I’m 24, I’m still young, I like to party, I like to party. I think a lot of my experiences just growing up in the spotlight and being a man and enjoying life are reflected in my work."

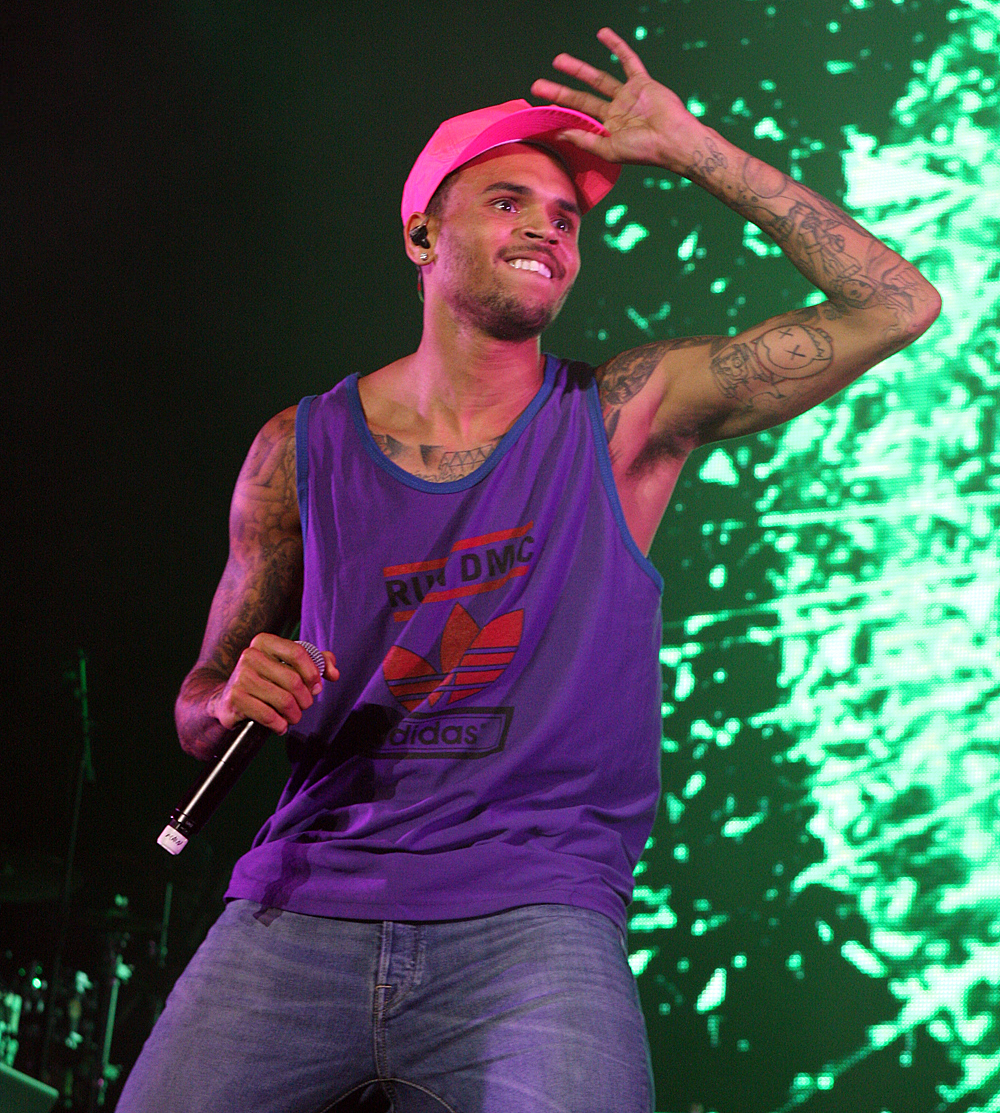
Chris Brown was featured on the song "Throwback".

In the October 2013, interview with Rolling Stone, B.o.B also spoke about why he decided to release "Ready", as the album's second single, saying: "I feel like it's the season where everybody's going back to school and football is back in season, which is one of my favorite sports, so I just felt like it was a great song for the time. Then me and Future, we're both from the east side [of Atlanta] so it felt like a real necessary move to make. What Future brings to the song is just crazy. Future came up with the hook and brought it to me first. I heard it and I loved it and so I spent a couple of days just trying to live with it and letting the music flow. The way I write now, I just try and let the music come to me. I really don't try to force anything, so if I catch something like a vibe or a feeling then I catch something and go with it and let that direct me. I feel like it's a more natural way to finish songs." He went on to add how it was hard to narrow down all the material he recorded for the album, saying: "It's pretty much done. I got enough material to put out two albums if I wanted to but it's really hard to narrow it down 'cause there's so many good songs but I also want to make that overall great album."

During the Rolling Stone interview, he spoke about if the first two singles were representative of the direction of the album, saying: "I feel like it's representative of the club side of the album but I'm really trying to give people all sides of me. So of course there's the side of me that likes going to the strip club and likes partying but there's also the other side of me that's a lot more transcendental and a lot more cerebral that's on the album as well." He also spoke about the most cerebral song on the album, saying: "I got a song called "Coast Line." It's not out yet, and I can't really say too much on it yet, but it's a very abstract song. I don't want to spoil anything for the first time listeners, but that's the one. I mean, I haven't really figured out all the songs that are going to be on the album, but that one definitely will be going on there." He also revealed that American singer Chris Brown would be featured on the album, saying: "I got Chris Brown on there. He's dope, man. We were at the studio and we always work in a lot of the same studios so he just stuck his head in the studio one day and I was like, "Yo, man, I got some shit that I need to play you." So he played me one of his records for his album and we both got on each other's album."

In November 2013, B.o.B held a listening session in Charlotte, North Carolina, to give bloggers, DJs and members of the media a first hand listen at Underground Luxury. While there, B.o.B gave insight on the recording process of the album and revealed he produced the majority of it. When asked how his approach to song writing on this album is different from his past albums, the rapper said: "Well the songwriting process for me has been the same really. I think what has changed is the content because I have always pulled from my life experience. My life has changed, so the content has changed, and my perspective has changed. I am much older and I see things much differently than I did when I was a kid."

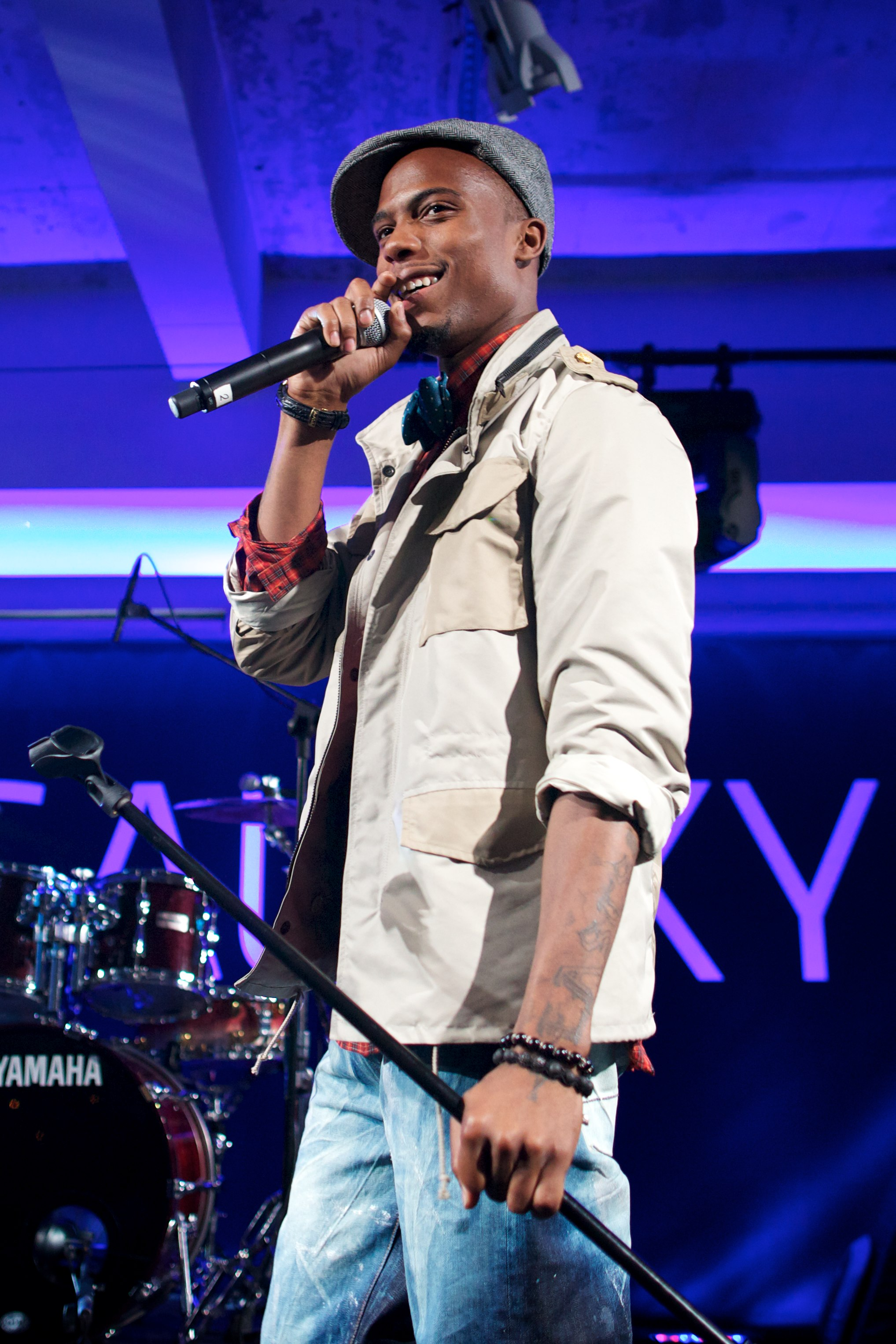
B.o.B. executive produced the album.

In a December 2013, interview with The Source, B.o.B spoke about why it took so long to release the album, saying: "I spent a lot of time on this project, man. I really wanted it to be natural. I started out doing a lot of club records cause I just wanted to be in the club. But as I had fun with it and grew with it, I saw what songs stayed jamming as the months went by. That let me and everyone know what records were the best records. And then other records came by like “John Doe”. I think that song took the longest to record because I had to go back and redo the verses cause they just weren’t right. They weren’t poppin’ with the song. A lot of it was just taking it serious and spending more time with it."

In The Source interview, he also spoke about some of the features on the album, saying: "I feel like they added a lot. Of course, Future is gonna bring that East side energy. Tip, that’s Hustle Gang so hands down. Juicy J brings that trippy vibe. But Priscilla Renee, she brought this certain soul to the record that I really wanted to keep. I really fought for her to stay on the album cause I believed in her. Her soul just gave me chills on the record when you hear it, when the music drops. I made sure I produced my ass off on that. Records like “Cranberry Moonwalk” surprised me because people are really gravitating towards that record. When I ask people what’s their favorite song, I’m see this at least 7 out of 10 times. But I produced that with FKi. They added a lot of flavor to it. I came with the guitars on there. It’s really just all a balance. Everybody brings in key components to the projects. I just glue it all together."

During The Source interview, he went on to discuss what sticks out the most about the album, saying: "The thing that stuck out to me about this album was that this would be the first time that I have an album that has the rawness of a mixtape, but still has the worldwide appeal of a critically acclaimed album. That’s a challenge because I feel like it’s a very hard thing to pull off because when you’re in the world of albums, it’s about so many more factors like numbers and politics get intertwined with it. But a mixtape, it’s like this is what I recorded, let’s put it out. So you gotta stay true to the integrity of the music."

== Release and promotion ==
On November 15, 2012, B.o.B released his ninth mixtape, titled Fuck 'Em We Ball, in promotion for the album. The mixtape features guest appearances from T.I., Juicy J, Mac Miller, Playboy Tre, Snoop Lion, Spodee and Iggy Azalea, with much of the production coming from B.o.B himself. The mixtape also spawned the single "We Still in This Bitch", which was released on January 8, 2013, and was certified gold by the Recording Industry Association of America (RIAA). In March 2013, while on set for T.I.’s “Memories Back Then” video-shoot, B.o.B shared with MTV that he’d like his fans to help choose a title for his third album."

On April 22, 2013 it was announced B.o.B would go on tour with fellow American rappers Wiz Khalifa, A$AP Rocky, Trinidad James, Joey Bada$$, Pro Era and Smoke DZA, for the Under the Influence concert tour. The tour would then begin on July 17, 2013. On July 11, 2013, B.o.B released a teaser video, in which he is seen in the studio recording a song titled "That How You Feel." On August 19, 2013, B.o.B released a song titled "Missing". On October 17, 2013, during an interview on BET's 106 & Park, B.o.B announced that the album would be released on December 17, 2013.

On October 30, 2013, B.o.B posted a video on YouTube titled "The Road to Underground Luxury". In the video, B.o.B talks about his life leading up to that point. On November 1, 2013, the album cover was unveiled. On November 4, 2013, the track listing was released, revealing guest appearances on the album from Future, Chris Brown, Mike Fresh, Playboy Tre, Priscilla Renea, Ester Dean, T.I. and Juicy J. On November 26, 2013, B.o.B teamed up with DJ Drama, to release a sampler, an official preview of the album. On December 17, 2013, B.o.B released the music video for "Paper Route", the third track from the album.

== Singles ==
On January 8, 2013, the album's first single "We Still in This Bitch", featuring T.I. and Juicy J, was released. The single managed to reach number 64 on the Billboard Hot 100. On May 21, 2013, the album's second single "HeadBand", which features 2 Chainz, was released. On June 30, 2013, the music video for "HeadBand", premiered on MTV Jams. The song has since sold 1,000,000 copies and peaked at number 53 on the Billboard Hot 100. On September 10, 2013, B.o.B released "Ready", his collaboration with fellow East Atlanta-native Future, as the album's third single. On October 15, 2013, the music video for "Ready", premiered on 106 & Park.

On December 3, 2013, the album's fourth single "John Doe" featuring Priscilla Renea was released. "John Doe" was serviced to rhythmic contemporary radio in the United States on January 7, 2014. On January 16, 2014, the music video was released for "John Doe". The song has since peaked at number 69 on the Billboard Hot 100 chart.

== Critical reception ==
Professional ratings
Aggregate scores
Source	Rating
Metacritic	51/100
Review scores
Source	Rating
AllHipHop	8/10
AllMusic	3/5 stars
Exclaim!	6/10
HipHopDX	2/5 stars
Newsday	B−
Now	2/5 stars
Rolling Stone	2.5/5 stars
XXL	(L)

According to the review aggregator Metacritic, Underground Luxury received "mixed or average reviews" based on a weighted average score of 51 out of 100 from 6 critic scores. Steven Goldstein of HipHopDX gave the album two out of five stars, saying "Underground Luxury does have its rare moments. “Paper Route” sees B.o.B. marathoning dissenting bars over rising synth and crashing percussion, and “John Doe” is an honest attack on infidelity and addiction. But neither do enough to buoy an album that starts and ends with unimaginative materialism. In post-Macklemore mainstream, burdening the position of alternative Hip-Popper or even nice-guy rapper is weighty, and it’s hard to blame B.o.B. for wanting to acclimate himself to a different scene. But the startling lack of creativity he exercises in doing so makes Underground Luxury easy to write off, and the duality that once powered crossover appeal is now hard to detect." David Jeffries of AllMusic gave the album three out of five stars, saying "Cobble out the stellar EP inside or consider it a pre-mall mixtape because the puzzling Underground Luxury mixes mack daddy music with mall rat tracks, even if B.o.B's conviction throughout suggests he sees them as equals." Miranda J. of XXL gave the album an L, saying "Furthermore, it seems as though B.o.B has made a name for himself in being an hip-hop [sic] artist who can adapt to every genre his creativity explores. Every record on Underground Luxury possess a multi-atmospheric feel, as the beats dip in between many genres of music and really places him in another rap league. It’s apparent that B.o.B isn’t trying to intimate other MCs. Clearly, when he boasts that Underground Luxury is more “hip-hop heavy,” he isn’t lying. The album certainly delivers." Erin Lowers of Exclaim! gave the album a six out of 10, saying "If Underground Luxury is the best representation of where Bobby Ray's sound stands, it's seems confused, but with luxury rap taking heed in hip-hop, B.o.B may just be the underdog worthy of an up-next title."

Jon Dolan of Rolling Stone gave the album two and a half stars out of five, saying "At times, his third LP goes for playalistic realism; "Paper Route" meditates on the perils of rapping about politics ("Look what happened to the Dixie Chicks"). But tracks with Future and 2 Chainz highlight his limitations on the mic, and without the Dr. Luke-assisted buoyancy of 2012's Strange Clouds, the album falls flat – moments of well-meaning ambition not withstanding." Niki Gatewood of AllHipHop gave the album an eight out ten, saying "Overall, it’s the near balance of the thought-provoking, the party-educing, and the unabashed confident lyricism that constitutes the solid effort of, B.o.B.’s, Underground Luxury." Ken Capobianco of The Boston Globe gave the album a mixed review, saying "The multi-talented B.o.B sounds like he can’t figure out just what kind of artist he wants to be on his third record. The rapper/musician born Bobby Ray Simmons Jr. tries to recapture the pop success of his debut with smartly conceived hooky songs while also churning out overly familiar trap-informed grooves. The latter dilute his charm and vision. When he focuses on spinning his autobiographical tales about his early struggles and the lessons of success over tightly arranged melodic tracks (“Nobody Told Me,” “Paper Route”) he hits the mark."

== Commercial performance ==
The album debuted at number 22 on the Billboard 200 chart, with first-week sales of 35,000 copies in the United States. This was a steep decline in sales from his first two albums which respectively sold 84,000 and 74,000 in their first week. In its second week the album dropped to number 30, selling 19,000 more copies in the United States. In its third week the album sold 9,000 more copies. In its fourth week the album sold 6,600 more copies in the United States. As of January 22, 2014 the album has sold 75,000 copies in the United States.

== Track listing ==
No.	Title	Writer(s)	Producer(s)	Length
1.	"All I Want"	Bobby Ray Simmons; Timothy Thomas; Theron Thomas; Cameron Wallace	Rock City; Cam Wallace	3:41
2.	"One Day"	Simmons; Aldrin Davis; Geoffrey Earley; Clarence Montgomery III	DJ Toomp; Geoffro Cause	4:45
3.	"Paper Route"	Simmons	B.o.B	3:32
4.	"Ready" (featuring Future)	Simmons; Noel Fisher; Nayvadius Wilburn; Montgomery; Rasool Diaz	Detail	3:39
5.	"Throwback" (featuring Chris Brown)	Simmons; Chris Brown; Montgomery	B.o.B	4:00
6.	"Back Me Up"	Simmons; Montgomery	B.o.B	3:31
7.	"Coastline"	Simmons; Yoan Chirescu; Raphaël Judrin; Pierre-Antoine Melki	soFLY and Nius	3:39
8.	"Wide Open" (featuring Ester Dean)	Simmons; Robin Braun; Ester Dean; Jeremy McArthur; Glenda Proby; Liv Lykke Schmidt	Arthur McArthur	2:33
9.	"FlyMuthaFucka"	Simmons	B.o.B	4:03
10.	"HeadBand" (featuring 2 Chainz)	Simmons; Tauheed Epps; Dijon McFarlane; Mikely Adam; Stanley Cox; Tyrone Griffin; Montgomery	DJ Mustard; Mike Free	3:40
11.	"John Doe" (featuring Priscilla)	Simmons; Earley; Priscilla Renea	Geoffro Cause	3:32
12.	"Cranberry Moonwalk" (featuring Mike Fresh)	Simmons; Stephen Bolden; Michael A. Davidson; Clarence Gray; Montgomery; Markous Roberts	B.o.B; FKi; Big Zar	4:46
13.	"Nobody Told Me"	Simmons; Jennifer Decilveo; Tish Hyman; Isaac de Boni; Michael Mule; James Scheffer	Jim Jonsin; Finatik N Zac	3:23
14.	"Forever" (featuring Playboy Tre)	Simmons; Montgomery; Jamieson Xavier Jones	B.o.B	4:34
15.	"We Still in This Bitch" (featuring T.I. and Juicy J)	Simmons; Clifford Harris; Jordan Houston; Michael Williams; Marquel Middlebrooks	Mike Will Made It; Marz	4:08
Total length:				57:08

== Personnel ==
Credits for Underground Luxury adapted from AllMusic.

- 2 Chainz - Featured Artist
- Kory Aaron - Assistant Engineer, Mixing Assistant
- Wilner Baptiste - Viola
- Black Violins - Strings
- B.o.B - Executive Producer, Keyboards, Primary Artist, Producer
- Del Bowers - Mixing Assistant
- Chris Brown - Featured Artist
- Bun B - Interviewer
- Nathan Burgess - Assistant Engineer
- Mike Caren - A&R
- Elliot Carter - Engineer
- Adam Catania - Assistant Engineer
- Geoffro Cause - Producer
- AJ Clark - Assistant Engineer
- Ester Dean - Featured Artist, Vocals (Background)
- Anne Declemente - A&R
- Aubry "Big Juice" Delaine - Engineer
- Detail - Engineer, Producer
- DJ Mustard - Producer
- DJ Toomp - Drum Programming, Engineer, Producer
- Verne Emmanuel - Mixing Assistant
- Finatik - Producer, Programming
- Joe Fitz - Engineer, Mixing
- FKI - Producer
- Mike Fresh - Featured Artist
- Future - Featured Artist
- Chris Galland - Mixing Assistant
- Chris Gehringer - Mastering
- John Horesco - Mastering
- Jim Jonsin - Keyboards, Producer, Programming
- Juicy J - Featured Artist
- Manny Marroquin - Mixing
- Marz - Producer
- Niko Marzouca - Engineer
- Hannibal Matthews - Photography
- Arthur McArthur - Producer
- Mike WiLL Made It - Producer
- J.P. "The Specialist" Negrete - Engineer
- Nius - Producer
- Stefhania Oval - Tributee
- Doug Peterson - Associate Producer
- Playboy Tre - Featured Artist
- Priscilla - Featured Artist
- Brian Richardson - A&R, Associate Producer
- Rock City - Producer
- Zane Shoemake - Mixing Assistant
- Bobby Simmons - Engineer
- Bobby Ray Simmons - Engineer
- soFLY - Producer
- Brian Springler - Engineer
- Kevin Marcus Sylvester - Violin
- T.I. - Featured Artist
- Ty$ - Vocals (Background)
- Virgilio Tzaj - Art Direction, Design
- Joseph Valburn - Cello
- Cam Wallace - Producer
- Randy Warnken - Mixing Assistant
- Finis "KY" White - Engineer, Mixing
- Big Zar - Producer

== Charts ==
=== Weekly charts ===
Chart (2013)	Peak position
US Billboard 200	22
US Top R&B/Hip-Hop Albums (Billboard)	7

=== Year-end charts ===
Chart (2014)	Position
US Top R&B/Hip-Hop Albums (Billboard)	37

== Certifications and sales ==
Region	Certification	Certified units/sales
United States (RIAA)	Gold	500,000^{‡}
^{‡} Sales+streaming figures based on certification alone.
