= Headband (song) =

Single by B.o.B featuring 2 Chainz

from the album Underground Luxury
- Released: May 21, 2013
- Recorded: 2012
- Genre: Hip hop
- Length: 3:40
- Label: Rebel Rock; Grand Hustle; Atlantic
- Songwriters: Bobby Ray Simmons, Jr.; Tauheed Epps; Dijon McFarlane; Mikely Adam; Stanley Cox; Tyrone Griffin; Clarence Montgomery III
- Producer: DJ Mustard

B.o.B singles chronology
"Memories Back Then" (2013)	"Headband" (2013)	"Brokenhearted" (2013)

2 Chainz singles chronology
"We Own It (Fast & Furious)" (2013)	"Headband" (2013)	"Bubble Butt" (2013)

Music video
- "Headband" on YouTube

"Headband" is a song by American hip hop recording artist B.o.B. It was released on May 21, 2013, as the lead single from his third studio album, Underground Luxury (2013). The song, produced by American hip hop record producer Mustard, features a guest appearance from fellow American rapper 2 Chainz. The song peaked at number 53 on the Billboard Hot 100.

== Background ==
On April 4, 2013 B.o.B revealed he would release his third studio album before his upcoming rock EP. On May 12, 2013 B.o.B tweeted: "Underground Luxury ... coming this summer... #staytuned", revealing the title of his third studio album. On May 13, 2013 radio personality Funkmaster Flex, premiered "Headband", the album's first official single. The song would be released to digital retailers on May 21, 2013.

== Music video ==
On June 29, 2013 behind-the-scenes footage of the music video was released online. The video was directed by Ryan Patrick. On June 30, 2013, the music video premiered on MTV Jams.

== Chart performance ==
=== Weekly charts ===
Chart (2013)	Peak position
Canada Hot 100 (Billboard)	67
US Billboard Hot 100	53
US Hot R&B/Hip-Hop Songs (Billboard)	16
US Hot Rap Songs (Billboard)	15
US Rhythmic Airplay (Billboard)	9

=== Year-end charts ===
Chart (2013)	Position
US Hot R&B/Hip-Hop Songs (Billboard)	55
US Rap Songs (Billboard)	41
Chart (2014)	Position
US Hot R&B/Hip-Hop Songs (Billboard)	95

== Certifications ==
Region	Certification	Certified units/sales
New Zealand (RMNZ)	Platinum	30,000^{‡}
United States (RIAA)	4× Platinum	4,000,000^{‡}
^{‡} Sales+streaming figures based on certification alone.

== Release history ==
Country	Date	Format	Label
United States	May 21, 2013	Digital download	Rebel Rock, Grand Hustle, Atlantic Records
