= Or Nah (Ty Dolla Sign song) =

Single by Ty Dolla $ign featuring Wiz Khalifa and DJ Mustard

from the EP Beach House EP
- Released: January 7, 2014
- Recorded: 2013
- Genre: Dirty rap; R&B
- Length: 4:11
- Label: Taylor Gang; Pu$haz Ink; Atlantic
- Songwriters: Tyrone Griffin; Cameron Thomaz; Dijon McFarlane; Mikely Adam; Lemmie Crockem; The Weeknd (remix)
- Producers: DJ Mustard; Mike Free

Ty Dolla Sign singles chronology
"Paranoid" (2013)	"Or Nah" (2014)	"You and Your Friends" (2014)

Wiz Khalifa singles chronology
"Feelin' Myself" (2013)	"Or Nah" (2014)	"Party Girls" (2014)

DJ Mustard singles chronology
"Left, Right" (2013)	"Or Nah" (2014)	"Vato" (2014)

Remix cover

The Weeknd singles chronology
"Pretty" (2013)	"Or Nah (Remix)" (2014)	"Wanderlust" (2014)

Music video
- "Or Nah (Remix)" on YouTube

"Or Nah" is a song by American rapper and singer Ty Dolla Sign featuring American rapper Wiz Khalifa and American record producer DJ Mustard. Written alongside Lemmie Crockem and Mike Free (the latter of whom produced the song with DJ Mustard), the song was released by Atlantic Records on January 7, 2014, as the second single from the former's debut EP Beach House EP (2014). On June 10, 2014, the remix featuring Canadian singer-songwriter the Weeknd was released; three days later, its accompanying music video was released.

The song peaked at number 48 on the US Billboard Hot 100 chart and received septuple platinum certification by the Recording Industry Association of America (RIAA). On April 29, 2014, it impacted rhythmic contemporary radio in the United States. The song samples the signature "bed squeaking" from Trillville's 2004 single "Some Cut".

== Critical reception ==
Upon its release, "Or Nah" was met with generally positive reviews from music critics. Complex described it as "slang expander that's sure to alter your day-to-day work conversations". About the song XXL magazine wrote, "The Taylor Gang affiliate enlists Wiz Khalifa to come through on the DJ Mustard-produced 'Oh Nah' [sic]—a collaborative cut void of romance and love, but rather focuses on getting straight to the point—or in this case, the sheets. While DJ Mustard subtlety guides the track with the sounds of creaking bedsprings, both Ty Dolla Sign and Wiz take the time to question their potential bedmates about food and weed, making sure the femme fatale can cater to their needs."

== Music video ==
A music video for the remix, directed by Ryan Patrick, was shot in January 2014 and released on June 13, 2014.

=== Critical reception ===
Rap-Up described the music video as "dark and mysterious", also noting that it features "a bevy of sexy ladies". The Fader wrote that, "the darkly seductive clip remains placid and uneventful throughout, a late plot twist leaves us wondering if Ty's pussy-hunting will meet a crazed fate". Stereogum compared the video to a Swedish thriller, "which features a horror-movie plot twist at the end".

== Charts ==
=== Weekly charts ===
Chart (2014)	Peak position
Belgium Urban (Ultratop Flanders)	48
Canada Hot 100 (Billboard)	78
US Billboard Hot 100	48
US Hot R&B/Hip-Hop Songs (Billboard)	12
US R&B/Hip-Hop Airplay (Billboard)	36

=== Year-end charts ===
Chart (2014)	Position
US Hot R&B/Hip-Hop Songs (Billboard)	33

== Certifications ==
Region	Certification	Certified units/sales
Canada (Music Canada)	2× Platinum	160,000^{‡}
Denmark (IFPI Danmark)	Platinum	90,000^{‡}
Italy (FIMI)	Gold	50,000^{‡}
New Zealand (RMNZ)	4× Platinum	120,000^{‡}
Spain (Promusicae)	Gold	30,000^{‡}
United Kingdom (BPI)	2× Platinum	1,200,000^{‡}
United States (RIAA)	Diamond	10,000,000^{‡}
^{‡} Sales+streaming figures based on certification alone.
