= Paranoid (Ty Dolla Sign song) =

Single by Ty Dolla $ign featuring B.o.B

from the album Beach House EP
- Released: September 10, 2013
- Recorded: 2013
- Genre: Hip hop; snap
- Length: 3:36
- Label: Taylor Gang; Atlantic; Pushaz Ink
- Songwriters: Tyrone Griffin; Bobby Simmons; Dijon McFarlane
- Producer: DJ Mustard

Ty Dolla $ign singles chronology
"Irie" (2013)	"Paranoid" (2013)	"Or Nah" (2014)

B.o.B singles chronology
"Ready" (2013)	"Paranoid" (2013)	"John Doe" (2013)

Remix cover

Music video
- "Paranoid" on YouTube

"Paranoid" is a song by American rapper and singer Ty Dolla $ign featuring American rapper B.o.B, released on September 10, 2013 as the first single from the former's debut EP, Beach House EP (2014). Written by the artists alongside producer DJ Mustard, "Paranoid" is a hip hop song that lyrically describes being in fear of getting caught cheating.

"Paranoid" received overall favorable reviews from music critics. The song peaked at number 29 on the US Billboard Hot 100 chart and reached number nine on the US Billboard Hot R&B/Hip-Hop Songs chart. An accompanying music video premiered through Revolt and YouTube on October 22, 2013 that features both Ty and B.o.B being tortured by their girlfriends.

== Development ==
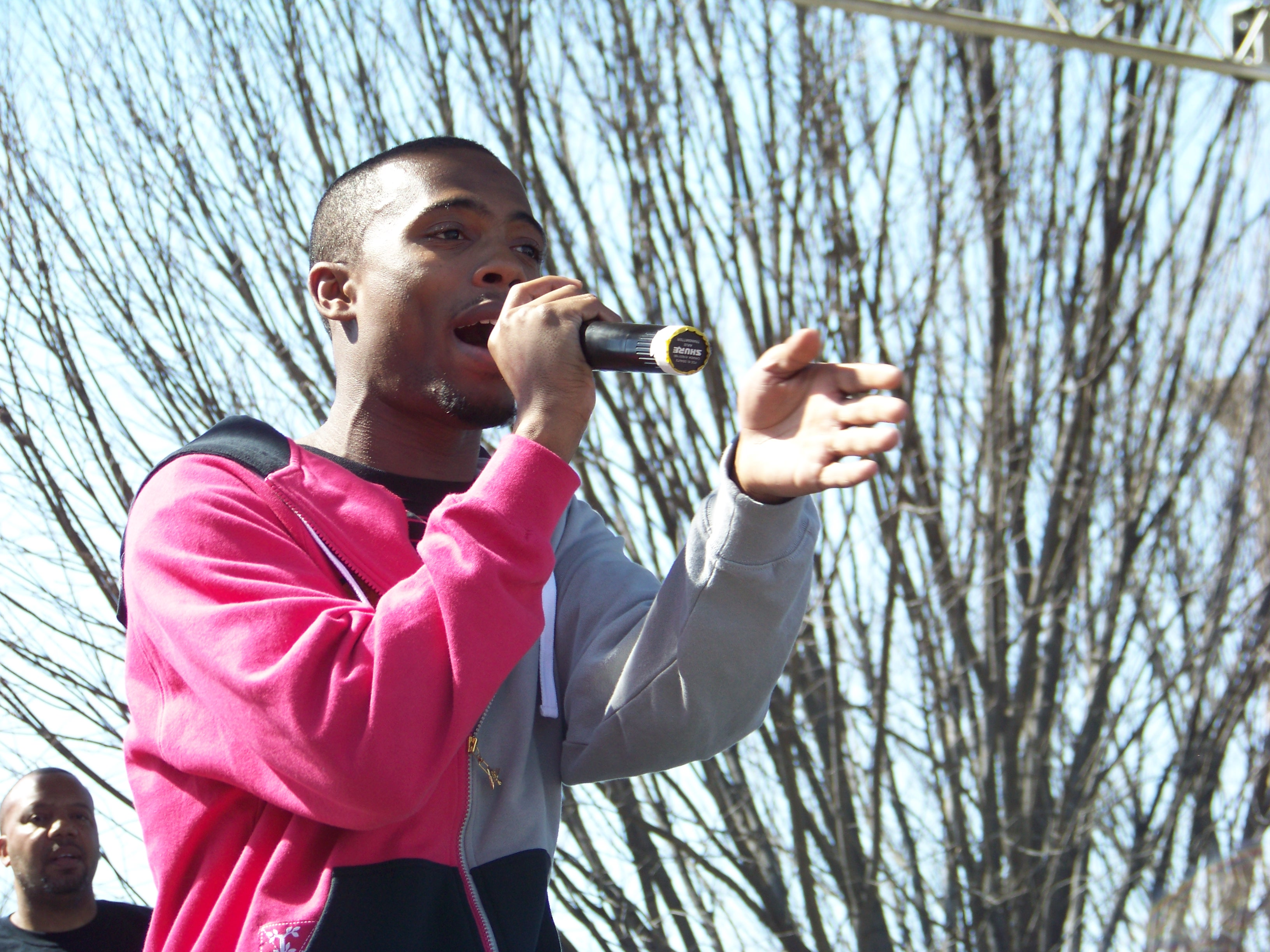
Rapper B.o.B (pictured) has a verse on the single version of "Paranoid".

"Paranoid" is a hip hop song backed by a synthesizer-driven production created by DJ Mustard. The song was originally recorded by Ty Dolla Sign and his frequent collaborator Joe Moses, and it was included on DJ Mustard's Ketchup mixtape.

It was then released again on Ty's July 2013 mixtape, Beach House 2. Then, when the song was officially released and pushed as a single later in the year, Moses' verse had been replaced by Ty's Atlantic Records label-mate B.o.B. It was rumored that Moses had been replaced by B.o.B due to Moses' comments in his verse about T.I.'s wife Tameka Cottle, however Ty denied the rumor and deemed it "hilarious."

== Content ==
On the song, Ty croons about him juggling a relationship between two different women, and being worried about one of them finding out about the other. Overall, the two artists detail multiple girls attempting to catch them in the act cheating, causing them to be on edge.

== Release ==
The song premiered on Rap Radar on August 28, 2013, where it was announced that it would be released as a single on September 10, 2013. As promised, on September 10, 2013, the song was released for digital download as the first single from Ty's debut EP Beach House EP on Amazon.com.

On December 15, 2013, Ty performed the song during Power 106's Cali Christmas and was backed by DJ Mustard on the turntables as he performed. On December 17, 2013, Ty performed the song for the first time on national television on DJ Skee's Skee Live via AXS TV. He was accompanied by Joe Moses who performed his verse on the studio version of the song. On January 27, 2014, Ty performed "Paranoid" along with DJ Mustard on The Arsenio Hall Show. Then on March 15, 2014, Ty performed the song during Taylor Gang's set at SXSW. On March 21, 2014, Ty performed "Paranoid" accompanied by The Roots on The Tonight Show Starring Jimmy Fallon.

The song's official remix was also featured on the Beach House EP. It featured new guest appearances by Trey Songz, French Montana and DJ Mustard. On January 13, 2014, the remix premiered via SoundCloud and on the following day, it was released to iTunes. The remix was serviced to mainstream urban radio in the United States on February 12, 2014.

== Critical reception ==
"Paranoid" was met with generally positive reviews from music critics. Vibe referred to the song as Ty's introduction to the masses and said he "has a hit on his hands." Christopher Weingarten of Rolling Stone said, it features "frank lines delivered with Casanova charm and a thin layer of computer love." Matt Aceto of HotNewHipHop called it one of the better songs on the tape, giving credit to the chorus and Joe Moses' verse. Chris Jenkins of Pitchfork praised Joe Moses' verse on the original song, but he called B.o.B's a "tryhard verse." Overall, he said the song's economy is its greatest strength. Grant Jones of RapReviews credited Trey Songz for upstaging Ty and called French Montana's verse on the remix "entertaining" but found Ty's performance on the song to be "an age-old example of limited ability." In February 2014, Complex named it the fourth best song that DJ Mustard had produced.

== Chart performance ==
"Paranoid" debuted at number 97 on US Billboard Hot 100 for the week of January 4, 2014. Ten weeks later, it peaked at number 29 and spent a total of twenty weeks on the chart. It peaked at number nine on the US Hot R&B/Hip-Hop Songs chart. On October 9, 2018, the single was certified double platinum by the Recording Industry Association of America (RIAA), for combined sales and streaming equivalent units of over two million units in the United States.

== Music video ==
A screenshot of the music video, where Ty Dolla Sign is laying on the floor after being stabbed.

On October 22, 2013, the Ethan Lader-directed music video premiered via Sean Combs's Revolt network.

Interspersed throughout the video's duration are clips of Ty Dolla Sign performing the song laying expressionless on his back, with blood on the floor as if he had been backstabbed.

Narratively, Ty is hunted down by his two female lovers when they discover that he has been cheating on them. They team up to get revenge, chasing him through the streets and attacking him at home. By the end of the night, Ty finds himself bleeding out on the middle of his kitchen floor, from a stab wound courtesy of his two lovers. Meanwhile, B.o.B suffers a similar fate via a drugged drink given to him by a seductive, promiscuous woman. All women in the video are seen with near-invisible irises, and inspects crawling on them. Ty's body is then taken away in the trunk of a car.

== Charts ==
=== Weekly charts ===
Chart (2013–2014)	Peak position
Belgium (Ultratip Bubbling Under Flanders)	88
Belgium Urban (Ultratop Flanders)	39
US Billboard Hot 100	29
US Hot R&B/Hip-Hop Songs (Billboard)	9
US Rhythmic Airplay (Billboard)	6

=== Year-end charts ===
Chart (2014)	Position
US Hot R&B/Hip-Hop Songs (Billboard)	28
US Rhythmic (Billboard)	27

== Certifications ==
Region	Certification	Certified units/sales
Canada (Music Canada)	Gold	40,000^{‡}
New Zealand (RMNZ)	Platinum	30,000^{‡}
United Kingdom (BPI)	Silver	200,000^{‡}
United States (RIAA)	2× Platinum	2,000,000^{‡}
^{‡} Sales+streaming figures based on certification alone.

== Release history ==
Country	Date	Format	Label
United States	September 10, 2013	Digital download	Taylor Gang Records; Atlantic Records
United States	November 6, 2013	Mainstream urban radio	Taylor Gang Records; Atlantic Records
