= Beach House EP =

EP by Ty Dolla Sign
- Released: January 21, 2014
- Recorded: 2013
- Genres: R&B; hip hop
- Length: 33:30
- Label: Atlantic
- Producers: Ty Dolla Sign (also exec.); Wiz Khalifa (exec.); Cardo; DJ Mustard; D.R.U.G.$.; D'Mile; Mike Free; Young Chop

Ty Dolla Sign chronology
Beach House 2 (2013)	Beach House EP (2014)	Free TC (2015)

Singles from Beach House EP
- 1. "Paranoid" Released: September 10, 2013; 2. "Or Nah" Released: January 7, 2014; 3. "Paranoid (Remix)" Released: January 14, 2014

Beach House EP is the debut extended play (EP) by American rapper and singer Ty Dolla Sign. It was released on January 21, 2014, by Atlantic Records. Ty mostly produced through the entirety of this EP, alongside the variety of the other record producers such as DJ Mustard, D'Mile and Young Chop, among others. The EP features guest appearances from Wiz Khalifa, B.o.B, French Montana, Trey Songz, Twista, Jay Rock, Travis Scott and Fredo Santana, among others. The EP was supported by three singles: "Paranoid" featuring B.o.B, "Or Nah" featuring Wiz Khalifa and DJ Mustard, and the remix to the first single entitled "Paranoid (Remix)".

== Background ==
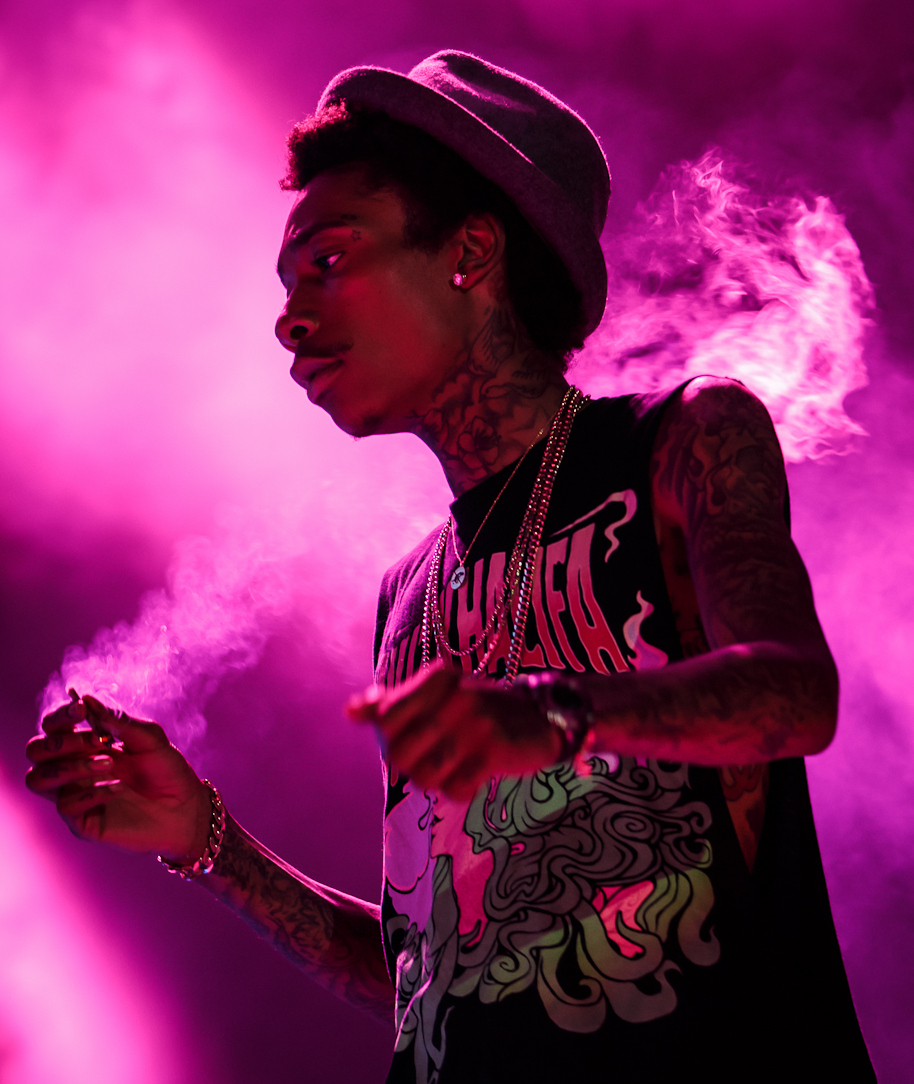
Rapper Wiz Khalifa makes an appearance on the single "Or Nah" and executive produced the album.

In 2012, Ty Dolla Sign signed a deal to Atlantic Records. On October 1, 2012, Ty released his official debut mixtape, called Beach House. On July 1, 2013, Ty released his second mixtape as a sequel to its whole Beach House mixtape series, called Beach House 2. Beach House 2 features guest appearances from Too Short, Wiz Khalifa, Juicy J and Kirko Bangz, among others. On the following day, Ty revealed that he signed a deal to Khalifa's Taylor Gang Records. In 2013, Ty, Khalifa and rapper ASAP Rocky performed on the "Under the Influence of Music 2" tour.

On December 11, 2013, Ty announced that his debut retail project would be called Beach House EP. The EP revealed that the project would be featuring guest appearances from Casey Veggies, Wiz Khalifa, Twista, Jay Rock, Trey Songz, French Montana, Travis Scott and Fredo Santana, while the production was primarily handled by Ty Dolla Sign himself, along with DJ Mustard, Cardo and Young Chop, among others. He stated that the EP would be featured a new sound from him and that it would be on a whole other level compared to his other mixtapes. Ty Dolla Sign described the EP as being a preview for his debut album, due for the fact that it would be released later during 2014.

== Singles ==
On September 10, 2013, the EP's first single "Paranoid" was released. It featured rapper B.o.B and production by DJ Mustard. On October 22, 2013, the Ethan Lader-directed music video was premiered via Diddy's Revolt. The song's official remix was featured on the EP featuring new guest appearances by Trey Songz, French Montana and DJ Mustard.

On January 7, 2014, Ty Dolla Sign released the second single from Beach House EP, "Or Nah" featuring Wiz Khalifa and DJ Mustard. Additionally the song's production was handled by DJ Mustard and it contains a sample of Trillville's "Some Cut". The music video was filmed during January 2014. On February 27, 2014, Ty Dolla Sign revealed that "Or Nah" from Beach House EP, would receive a remix with Drake and The Weeknd.

On January 14, 2014, the remix to "Paranoid", featuring Trey Songz, French Montana and DJ Mustard was released. The remix was serviced on mainstream urban radio in the United States on February 12, 2014.

On January 24, 2014, the music video to the Jay Rock-featuring "Never be the Same" was released.

== Critical reception ==
Professional ratings
Review scores
Source	Rating
AllMusic	3.5/5 stars
HipHopDX	4/5 stars
Pitchfork Media	7.6/10
RapReviews	3/10
Rolling Stone	3/5 stars
XXL	3/5 (L)

Upon its release, Beach House EP was met with generally positive reviews from music critics. At Metacritic, which assigns a normalized rating out of 100 to reviews from mainstream critics, the album received an average score of 69, based on 6 reviews, indicating "generally favorable reviews". Justin Hunte of HipHopDX said, "From mic to plug, Beach House EP triumphantly strikes the same note. The Los Angeles-native is a talented songwriter even while essentially re-writing the same song, which is a complicated square to dance in without two-stepping too close to redundancy. Remaining interesting without contextual diversity is tricky. Fortunately, Ty Dolla $ign doesn't have those problems." Craig Jenkins of Pitchfork Media commented saying, "Beach House the EP succeeds where the mixtape Beach House 2 didn’t, further commercializing Ty’s sound without sacrificing the meat and potatoes of it, the foul-mouthed, sex-positivity of Ty’s quixotic bedroom capers and the production’s precarious balance between slight, house-informed ratchet music, trap and densely arranged traditional R&B sounds." Christopher Weingarten of Rolling Stone said, "Ty Dolla $ign's singsong rap&B has maintained a perfect balance of comforting croon and pickup-artist kink. This solid seven-song EP, his first official release, doesn't sail out too far from the formula of Ty's Beach House mixtapes."

David Jeffries of AllMusic stated, "Ty Dolla $ign comes off as a hip-hop and street-level alternative to R. Kelly or T-Pain, one who's able to sling the slang like it ain't no thing, while making epic musical moments. There's no filler, which isn't so stunning since this is an EP, and before there's even a moment of lackluster music, the large guest roster rotates another exciting name through." Erin Lowers of XXL said, "While Ty Dolla $ign may not be the most lyrically endowed, it’s apparent that his melodic deliveries illuminates the chopped and screwed music soundscape. Enhanced with layered synths and hyperactive basslines, Beach House EP is an open narrative about sexual politics and hedonistic satisfaction. Despite offering ratchet R&B at its finest, Ty Dolla $ign fails to provide a memorable experience that differs from his previous two mixtapes." Grant Jones of RapReviews gave the album a negative review saying, "Beach House EP is cringeworthy, brainless hip hop at its worst. It's like listening to a lobotomised T-Pain perform an album written by Yo Gotti, without the polished delivery of either. The one redeeming feature is DJ Mustard's infectious, deceptively simple production. It's barebones, yet could give genuine talent the perfect platform to weave their magic on - unfortunately Ty Dolla Sign just isn't the person to deliver 'magic'."

=== Accolades ===
Complex named it the fourteenth best album of the first half of 2014. Writing for them, Ross Scarano said, "Even when he's putting together a slim, seven-song EP, L.A. R&B songwriter and dick-slinger Ty Dolla $ign can't resist a spoken-word intro. The multipart, string-driven opener "Work," with its chronicle of Ty's journey from loving these hoes to loving this money, is enough to make the EP worth your time. Stick around and you've got "Paranoid," which, wow, have you heard the word boogawolf before? Then there's "Or Nah," another slang expander that's sure to alter your day-to-day work conversations."

== Commercial performance ==
The EP debuted at number 51 on the Billboard 200, with first-week sales of 6,100 copies in the United States. As of October 2015, the EP sold 43,000 copies in the United States.

== Track listing ==
No.	Title	Writer(s)	Producer(s)	Length
1.	"Work" (featuring Casey Veggies, Twista and Nate Howard)	Tyrone Griffin, Jr.; Dernst Emile; Casey Jones; Carl Mitchell; Nate Howard; MacKenzie Slotts	D'Mile; D.R.U.G.$.	7:09
2.	"Paranoid" (featuring B.o.B)	Griffin, Jr.; Bobby Ray Simmons Jr.; Dijon McFarlane	DJ Mustard	3:36
3.	"Paranoid (Remix)" (featuring Trey Songz, French Montana and DJ Mustard)	Griffin, Jr.; McFarlane; Karim Kharbouch; Tremaine Neverson	DJ Mustard	4:41
4.	"Or Nah" (featuring Wiz Khalifa and DJ Mustard)	Griffin, Jr.; McFarlane; Cameron Thomaz	DJ Mustard	4:11
5.	"Familiar" (featuring Travis Scott and Fredo Santana)	Griffin, Jr.; Derrick Coleman; Tyree Pittman; Jacques Webster	Young Chop	4:23
6.	"Wood & Leather (Whenever)" (featuring Big TC and Pops)	Griffin, Jr.; Emile; Ronald LaTour	Cardo	5:06
7.	"Never Be the Same" (featuring Jay Rock)	Griffin, Jr.; Emile; Glenda Proby; Johnny McKinzie	Ty Dolla Sign; D'Mile	4:24

== Personnel ==
Album credits adapted from AllMusic.

- Mickley Adam - producer
- Shawn Barron - A&R
- Big TC - featured artist
- B.o.B - featured artist
- Ryan Brady - marketing
- Cardo - producer
- Casey Veggies - featured artist
- Adam Catania - assistant
- D'Mile - engineer
- Brian "Busy" Dackowski - marketing
- DJ Mustard - featured artist, producer
- Will Dzombak - management
- Dernst "D'Mile" Emile II - producer
- French Montana - featured artist
- Lanre Gaba - A&R
- Jean-Marie Horvat - mixing
- Peter Lee Johnson - violin
- Alex Kirzhner -design
- David Kutch - mastering
- Kevin Liles - management
- Natepoetics - featured artist
- Joya Nemley - A&R
- Musashi Ono - photography
- Ricky P. - additional production
- Pops - featured artist
- Marcus Reddick - violin
- Jay Rock - featured artist
- Fredo Santana - featured artist
- Travis Scott - featured artist
- Cameron Thomaz - management
- Carolyn Tracey - package production
- Trey Songz - featured artist
- Twista - featured artist
- Ty Dolla Sign - additional production, engineer, executive producer, primary artist, producer
- Vince Watson - engineer
- Wiz Khalifa - featured artist
- Young Chop - producer

== Charts ==
Chart (2014)	Peak position
US Billboard 200	51
US Top R&B/Hip-Hop Albums (Billboard)	13

== Certifications ==
Certifications for "Beach House EP"
Region	Certification	Certified units/sales
New Zealand (RMNZ)	Platinum	15,000^{‡}
^{‡} Sales+streaming figures based on certification alone.
