= John Doe (song) =

2013 single by B.o.B

Single by B.o.B featuring Priscilla

from the album Underground Luxury
- Released: December 3, 2013
- Recorded: 2013
- Genre: Conscious hip hop
- Length: 3:32
- Label: Rebel Rock; Grand Hustle; Atlantic
- Songwriters: Simmons; Earley; Priscilla Renea
- Producer: Geoffro Cause

B.o.B singles chronology
"Paranoid" (2013)	"John Doe" (2013)	"Numb" (2013)

Priscilla singles chronology
"Lovesick" (2010)	"John Doe" (2013)	"Family Tree" (2018)

Music video
- "John Doe" on YouTube

"John Doe" is a song by American rapper B.o.B, featuring guest vocals from American singer-songwriter Muni Long, who was known at the time of the song's release as Priscilla. It was released on December 3, 2013, as the fourth single from B.o.B's third studio album, Underground Luxury (2013). It has since peaked at number 69 on the US Billboard Hot 100 chart.

== Music video ==
The song's music video, directed by K. Asher Levin, was released on January 16, 2014. The video features American pornographic actress Skin Diamond, portraying a young lady who has recently moved to Hollywood in hopes of becoming a star. American pornographic actress Allie Haze also makes a cameo appearance.

== Remix ==
On the song's official remix, which was released on May 27, 2014, American singer-songwriter Sevyn Streeter replaces Priscilla on the chorus. This reworked version also features new production.

== Chart performance ==
=== Weekly charts ===
Chart (2014)	Peak position
Belgium (Ultratip Bubbling Under Flanders)	6
Belgium Urban (Ultratop Flanders)	11
Czech Republic Airplay (ČNS IFPI)	67
Netherlands (Dutch Top 40)	21
Netherlands (Single Top 100)	32
Lebanon (The Official Lebanese Top 20)	11
Slovenia (SloTop50)	40
US Billboard Hot 100	69
US Hot R&B/Hip-Hop Songs (Billboard)	18
US Hot Rap Songs (Billboard)	10
US Pop Airplay (Billboard)	29
US Rhythmic Airplay (Billboard)	21

=== Year-end charts ===
Chart (2014)	Position
Netherlands (Dutch Top 40)	92
US Hot R&B/Hip-Hop Songs (Billboard)	99

== Release history ==
Region	Date	Format	Label
United States	January 7, 2014	Mainstream radio	Atlantic Records
