= We Still in This Bitch =

Single by B.o.B featuring T.I. and Juicy J

from the album Fuck Em We Ball and Underground Luxury
- Released: December 30, 2012
- Genre: Hip-hop
- Length: 4:07
- Label: Grand Hustle; Rebel Rock; Atlantic
- Songwriters: Bobby Simmons; Clifford Harris; Jordan Houston; Michael Williams; Marquel Middlebrooks
- Producers: Mike WiLL Made It; Marz

B.o.B singles chronology
"Out of My Mind" (2012)	"We Still in This Bitch" (2012)	"Memories Back Then" (2013)

T.I. singles chronology
"Sorry" (2012)	"We Still in This Bitch" (2012)	"Blurred Lines" (2013)

Juicy J singles chronology
"Die Young" (2012)	"We Still in This Bitch" (2012)	"Show Out" (2013)

Music video
- "We Still in This Bitch" on YouTube

"We Still in This Bitch" is a song by American hip hop recording artist B.o.B, released on December 30, 2012 as the lead single from his third studio album Underground Luxury (2013). The song, produced by Mike WiLL Made It and Marz, features guest appearances from fellow Southern rappers T.I. and Juicy J. The song initially appeared on B.o.B's ninth mixtape, entitled Fuck 'Em We Ball, which was released on November 15, 2012.

== Music video ==
The music video, directed by Decatur Dan, premiered on MTV on January 13, 2013.

== Chart performance ==
=== Weekly charts ===
Chart (2013)	Peak position
Canada Hot 100 (Billboard)	72
US Billboard Hot 100	64
US Hot R&B/Hip-Hop Songs (Billboard)	19
US Hot Rap Songs (Billboard)	15
US Rhythmic Airplay (Billboard)	9

=== Year-end charts ===
Chart (2013)	Position
US Hot R&B/Hip-Hop Songs (Billboard)	39
US Rap Songs (Billboard)	34
US Rhythmic (Billboard)	43

=== Certifications ===
Region	Certification	Certified units/sales
United States (RIAA)	Platinum	1,000,000^{‡}
^{‡} Sales+streaming figures based on certification alone.
