= Mullage =

American hip hop group

- Origin: Atlanta, Georgia, United States
- Genres: Hip hop
- Years active: 2009–present
- Labels: From the Ground Up, Jive
- Members: B Boi; B Town
- Website: Mullage Myspace

Mullage are a Dirty South hip hop and contemporary R&B duo from Atlanta, composed of B Boi and B Town. The two grew up a few miles from each other and met while in the US Navy when they were stationed in Virginia. While still in the Navy they recorded albums and mixtapes under the underground label Final Destination Records with producer/artist/CEO Chris Mooty. Once they were both out, they moved back to Atlanta and signed to From the Ground Up Records. The group's name is a combination of the words "musical collage". Their debut single, "Trick'n", was released in early May 2009 and entered the Billboard Hot R&B/Hip-Hop Songs chart.

== Discography ==
=== Mixtapes ===
- Elevators: The Pre-Album (Hosted by DJ Ill Will & DJ Rockstar) (2009)
- This Is For The Radio (Hosted by DJ Ill Will & DJ Rockstar) (2010)
- Believers Never Die (2015)

=== Singles ===
Year	Title	Chart positions	Album
Year	Title	U.S. R&B	Album
2009	"Trick'n"	35	
2013	"Don't Act Like It'"	-	
