= Ready (B.o.B song) =

Single by B.o.B featuring Future

from the album Underground Luxury
- Released: September 10, 2013
- Recorded: 2013
- Genre: Hip hop, trap
- Length: 3:40
- Label: Rebel Rock; Grand Hustle; Atlantic
- Songwriters: Simmons; Noel Fisher; Nayvadius Wilburn; Montgomery; Rasool Diaz
- Producer: Detail

B.o.B singles chronology
"Up Down (Do This All Day)" (2013)	"Ready" (2013)	"Paranoid" (2013)

Future singles chronology
"No Games" (2013)	"Ready" (2013)	"Shit" (2013)

Music video
- "Ready" on YouTube

"Ready" is a song by American rapper B.o.B featuring fellow American rapper Future. Produced by Noel "Detail" Fisher, it was released on September 10, 2013, as the third single from the former's third studio album, Underground Luxury (2013). The song was also featured in the jukebox soundtrack for WWE 2K15.

== Background ==
In an interview with Rolling Stone, B.o.B spoke on why he decided to release "Ready" as the album's third single, saying: "I feel like it's the season where everybody's going back to school and football is back in season, which is one of my favorite sports, so I just felt like it was a great song for the time. Then me and Future, we're both from the east side [of Atlanta] so it felt like a real necessary move to make. What Future brings to the song is just crazy. Future came up with the hook and brought it to me first. I heard it and I loved it and so I spent a couple of days just trying to live with it and letting the music flow. The way I write now, I just try and let the music come to me. I really don't try to force anything, so if I catch something like a vibe or a feeling then I catch something and go with it and let that direct me. I feel like it's a more natural way to finish songs."

== Music video ==
On August 22, 2013, B.o.B released a video compiling some of the greatest fights in sports history, with his song "Ready", playing in the background. On October 15, 2013, a teaser of the official music video was released online. The official video, directed by Mike Ho, was released later that day.

== Chart performance ==
Chart (2013)	Peak position
US Bubbling Under Hot 100 (Billboard)	5
US Hot R&B/Hip-Hop Songs (Billboard)	37

== Release history ==
Country	Date	Format	Label
United States	September 10, 2013	Digital download	Rebel Rock, Grand Hustle, Atlantic Records
United States	November 12, 2013	Urban contemporary radio	Rebel Rock, Grand Hustle, Atlantic Records
