= Memories Back Then =

Single by T.I. featuring B.o.B, Kendrick Lamar and Kris Stephens
- Released: April 22, 2013
- Recorded: 2012
- Genre: Hip hop; trap; R&B
- Length: 5:06
- Label: Grand Hustle; Epic
- Songwriters: Clifford Harris; Bobby Ray Simmons; Kendrick Duckworth; Maurice Jordan; Victoria Monét McCants
- Producer: Kenoe

Grand Hustle singles chronology
| "Top Back (Remix)" (2006) | "Memories Back Then" (2013) |

T.I. singles chronology
| "Pour It Up (Remix)" (2013) | "Memories Back Then" (2013) | "Wit' Me" (2013) |

B.o.B singles chronology
| "We Still in This Bitch" (2012) | "Memories Back Then" (2013) | "'Headband" (2013) |

Kendrick Lamar singles chronology
| "We Up" (2013) | "Memories Back Then" (2013) | "Collard Greens" (2013) |

Kris Stephens singles chronology
| "Memories Back Then" (2013) |

Music video
- "Memories Back Then" on YouTube

"Memories Back Then" is a song by American hip hop recording artist T.I., featuring guest appearances from fellow American rappers B.o.B and Kendrick Lamar, as well as vocals from American singer-songwriter Kris Stephens. The song, produced Maurice "Kenoe" Jordan, was initially released as a single by Hustle Gang on April 22, 2013. The song debuted and peaked at number 88 on the US Billboard Hot 100 chart.

== Background ==
T.I. had originally recorded "Memories Back Then", for his eighth studio album Trouble Man: Heavy Is the Head (2012). In an interview released on October 19, 2012, West Coast rapper Kendrick Lamar revealed that he recorded a song with T.I., for the aforementioned album. The song was also reported to feature B.o.B and sample Belgian-Australian singer-songwriter Gotye's hit single, "Somebody That I Used to Know". Although the track failed to appear on Trouble Man due to sample-clearance issues, B.o.B announced the song would be the first single from the Grand Hustle Records compilation album, Hustle Gang.

== Music and lyrics ==
The song's mass appeal attracted T.I. to the sample: "The record's just jamming. When I heard the twist they put on it, man, it was kind of a no-brainer." T.I. also chose the record for its crossover ability, which he has always been successful with in the past: "It sounds like hip-hop with an international twist to it, and I'm known for taking those types of records and bridging that gap between what we do and what they do," he explained, dropping in a couple of examples. "From M.I.A.'s 'Paper Planes' to 'Swagga Like Us,' we took Crystal Waters' 'Gypsy Woman' for 'Why You Wanna.'"

Over the drum-heavy sample, Lamar and Bobby Ray join T.I. in sharing some nostalgic stories, which he says reminds him of some of a few renowned MCs and their classic projects: "[We're] taking turns on our story about a female that we knew years, years, years ago before we were who we are today. It kinda puts me in the mind of the 'Da Art of Storytellin' [and The Art of Storytelling] from Outkast and Slick Rick. It puts me in the mind of that."

== Rework ==
The song failed to make Trouble Man or Hustle Gang‘s final respective track listing’s due to sample clearances. On December 17, 2012, T.I. appeared on Sway Calloway's Sway in the Morning radio show to promote the Hustle Gang album, while there he premiered "Memories Back Then".

T.I. did not want to abandon the song and felt the song needed to reach more people, so he had the song reworked, removing Gotye's "Somebody That I Used to Know" sample: "I rocked out as soon as I heard it. It felt relevant, it felt urgent. However, I was not able to work out a clearance. I didn't want to waste the opportunity because it was such a great performance and meaningful message from myself and B.o.B and Kendrick.", T.I. said to Rap-Up.

== Music video ==
In March 2013, T.I. filmed the music video for "Memories Back Then", in Los Angeles, California, alongside B.o.B, Kendrick Lamar and Kris Stephens. The music video for "Memories Back Then", directed by Philly Fly Boy, was released April 22, 2013. As of March 2021 the video has over 100 million views.

== Track listing ==
- Digital download
1. "Memories Back Then" — 5:06

== Charts ==
=== Weekly charts ===
| Chart (2013) | Peak position |
|---|---|
| US Billboard Hot 100 | 88 |
| US Hot R&B/Hip-Hop Songs (Billboard) | 30 |
| US Heatseekers Songs (Billboard) | 7 |

=== Year-end charts ===
| Chart (2013) | Position |
|---|---|
| US Hot R&B/Hip-Hop Songs (Billboard) | 86 |

== Release history ==
| Country | Date | Format | Label |
|---|---|---|---|
| United States | April 22, 2013 | Digital download | Grand Hustle |
| United States | April 25, 2013 | Mainstream urban radio | Grand Hustle |
| United States | September 18, 2013 | Digital download | Grand Hustle; Epic |
