= Ty Dolla Sign =

American rapper and singer (born 1982)

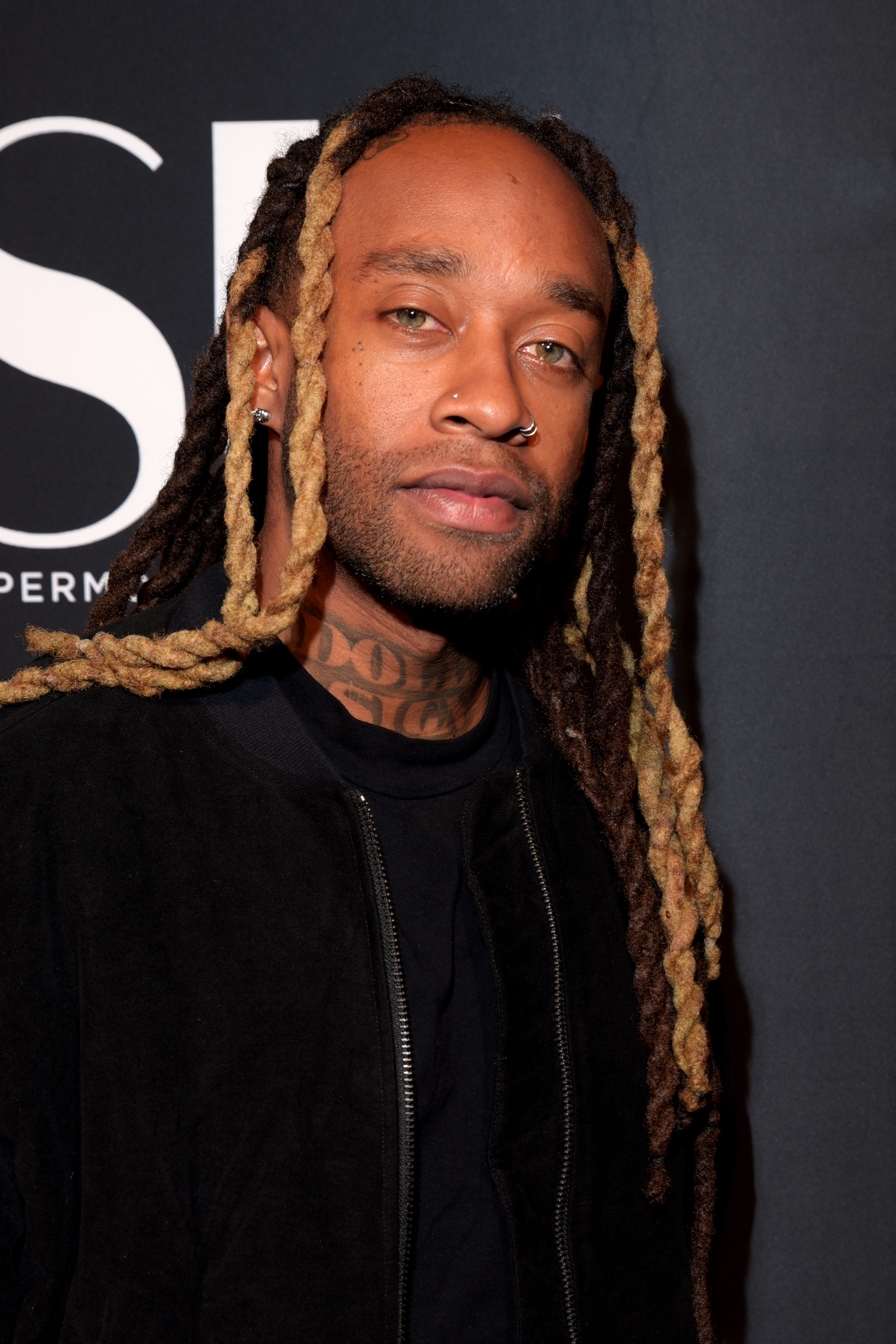
- Griffin in 2018

Background information
- Also known as: Ty$; Dolla Sign
- Born: Tyrone William Griffin Jr. April 13, 1982 (age 44); Los Angeles, California, U.S.
- Genres: West Coast hip-hop; R&B; trap; rock
- Occupations: Singer; rapper; songwriter; record producer
- Instruments: Vocals; keyboards; guitar; drums; sampler; bass guitar; synthesizer
- Works: Discography; production
- Years active: 2004–present
- Labels: Motown; EZMNY; The MVMNT; Pushaz Ink; Taylor Gang; Atlantic
- Member of: D.R.U.G.$.; TGOD Mafia; MihTy; ¥$
- Children: 1
- Website: dollasignworld.com

Tyrone William Griffin Jr. (born April 13, 1982), known professionally as Ty Dolla Sign (stylized as Ty Dolla $ign or Ty$), is an American singer, rapper, songwriter and record producer. Born and raised in Los Angeles, California, Griffin gained initial recognition for his guest appearance on California rapper YG's 2010 single "Toot It and Boot It", which entered the Billboard Hot 100. He signed with Atlantic Records in 2012, and Wiz Khalifa's Taylor Gang Entertainment the following year.

Griffin saw further mainstream recognition with his debut commercial extended play (EP), Beach House EP (2014). Its lead single, "Paranoid" (featuring B.o.B), marked his first entry on the Billboard Hot 100 as a lead artist—peaking within the chart's top 30—while its second single, "Or Nah" (featuring Wiz Khalifa and DJ Mustard, remixed with the Weeknd), received sextuple platinum certification by the Recording Industry Association of America (RIAA). His debut studio album, Free TC (2015), peaked at number 14 on the Billboard 200 and was supported by the platinum-certified singles "Blasé" (featuring Future and Rae Sremmurd) and "Saved" (featuring E-40). His second album, Beach House 3 (2017), peaked at number 11 on the Billboard 200, while his third album, Featuring Ty Dolla Sign (2020), peaked at number four. He has released the collaborative albums MihTy (2018) with Jeremih, Cheers to the Best Memories (2021) with Dvsn, and the Vultures (2024) duology with Kanye West—the latter's first entry was Griffin's first project to debut atop the Billboard 200.

Along with his own career, Griffin is known for his frequent guest appearances on songs by other artists; these include the Billboard Hot 100-top 40 singles "Work from Home" by Fifth Harmony, "Swalla" by Jason Derulo, "Hot Girl Summer" by Megan Thee Stallion, "Hit Different" by SZA, and "WusYaName" by Tyler, the Creator, as well as the diamond-certified "Psycho" by Post Malone, which peaked the chart. Furthermore, Griffin has been credited with songwriting and production work for other artists, most notably on the singles "Loyal" by Chris Brown, "Post to Be" by Omarion, and "FourFiveSeconds" by Rihanna, Kanye West and Paul McCartney. He has received six Grammy Award nominations. Aside from his solo production career, Griffin is also a member of the production team D.R.U.G.$., along with DJ Dahi, among others.

== Early life ==
Tyrone William Griffin Jr. was born on April 13, 1982, in Los Angeles, California, to Phyllis Mitchell and musician Tyrone Griffin, a member of the band Lakeside. He has said that through his father's involvement in Lakeside, he met the musical artists Earth, Wind & Fire and Prince as a child, which led to his love for and interest in soul music. Growing up in South Central Los Angeles, Griffin was a gang member, being part of the Bloods, while his brother was in the rival gang of the Crips.

== Career ==
=== 2004–2011: Career beginnings ===
Griffin began his music career by learning how to play the bass guitar and later picking up drums, guitars, keyboards, and the Akai MPC music workstation. Griffin and his writing partner Kory began working together after meeting in New York City in 2004, forming the duo Ty & Kory. The duo also made guest appearances on albums by other artists such as Sa-Ra Creative Partners and Black Milk. They performed the song "U", which was featured on Black Milk's album Popular Demand (2007). The duo signed a recording contract with Venus Brown's Buddah Brown Entertainment and then released a mixtape, Raw & Bangin Mixtape Vol 2 (2008). Ty & Kory had a falling out related to these ventures.

Griffin began working with Los Angeles-based rapper YG which provided him with the mainstream success of YG's 2010 single "Toot It and Boot It", which he co-performed and produced. In 2011, Griffin released his first solo song, "All Star" (featuring Joe Moses; remixed featuring Kid Ink) and his first solo mixtape, House on the Hill (2011). His follow up single, "My Cabana" (featuring Young Jeezy) was ranked on Complex's Best 50 Songs of 2012 list at number 23. Griffin co-founded and was a member of the production team D.R.U.G.$., alongside fellow music producers Chordz (or Chordz 3D) and G Casso, the latter of whom was murdered in 2011. Other producers later joined D.R.U.G.$., including Nate 3D, Buddah Shampoo, Fuego, DJ Mustard, and DJ Dahi.

=== 2012–2014: Beach House mixtapes ===
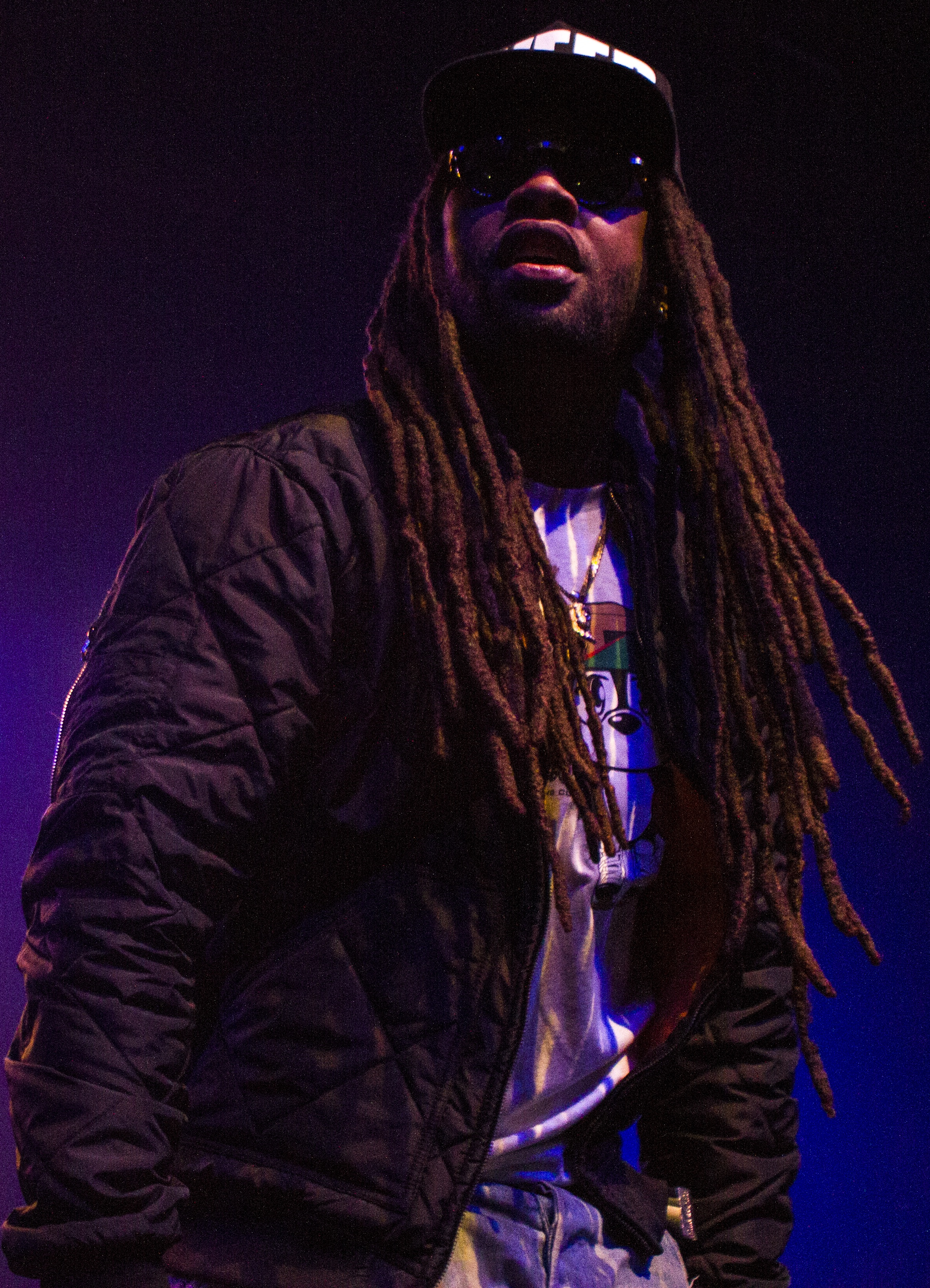
Griffin in November 2013

In 2012, Griffin signed a recording contract with Atlantic Records. He released his next mixtape, titled Beach House, on October 1, 2012. He followed with the sequel Beach House 2 on July 1, 2013, with guest appearances from Too Short, Wiz Khalifa, Juicy J, and Kirko Bangz, among others. Griffin signed a touring deal with Khalifa's Taylor Gang Entertainment. In mid-2013, he toured with Khalifa and ASAP Rocky, among others, on the Under the Influence of Music 2 concert tour.

On September 10, 2013, Griffin released a single, titled "Paranoid", which features a verse from B.o.B and production from DJ Mustard. The song was later announced to be the first single off his upcoming extended play (EP). On October 22, 2013, the Ethan Lader-directed music video for "Paranoid", premiered via Diddy's Revolt. The single was a hit, peaking at number 29 on the US Billboard Hot 100 and eventually being certified Platinum by the RIAA.

On January 7, 2014, Griffin released a second single titled "Or Nah" featuring Wiz Khalifa and DJ Mustard. The song's production was handled by DJ Mustard and it contains a sample of Trillville's "Some Cut". The music video was filmed during January 2014. The single was remixed featuring vocals from Canadian singer the Weeknd and was later certified triple Platinum by the RIAA.

On January 21, 2014, Griffin released his first major label project, Beach House EP. The EP features guest appearances from Casey Veggies, Wiz Khalifa, Twista, Jay Rock, Trey Songz, French Montana, Travis Scott, and Fredo Santana, while the production was primarily handled by Griffin himself, along with DJ Mustard, Cardo, and Young Chop, among others. Griffin described the EP as being a preview for his first major label studio album. The remix to "Paranoid", featuring Trey Songz, French Montana, and DJ Mustard, was also included on the EP.

=== 2014–2016: Free TC and Campaign ===
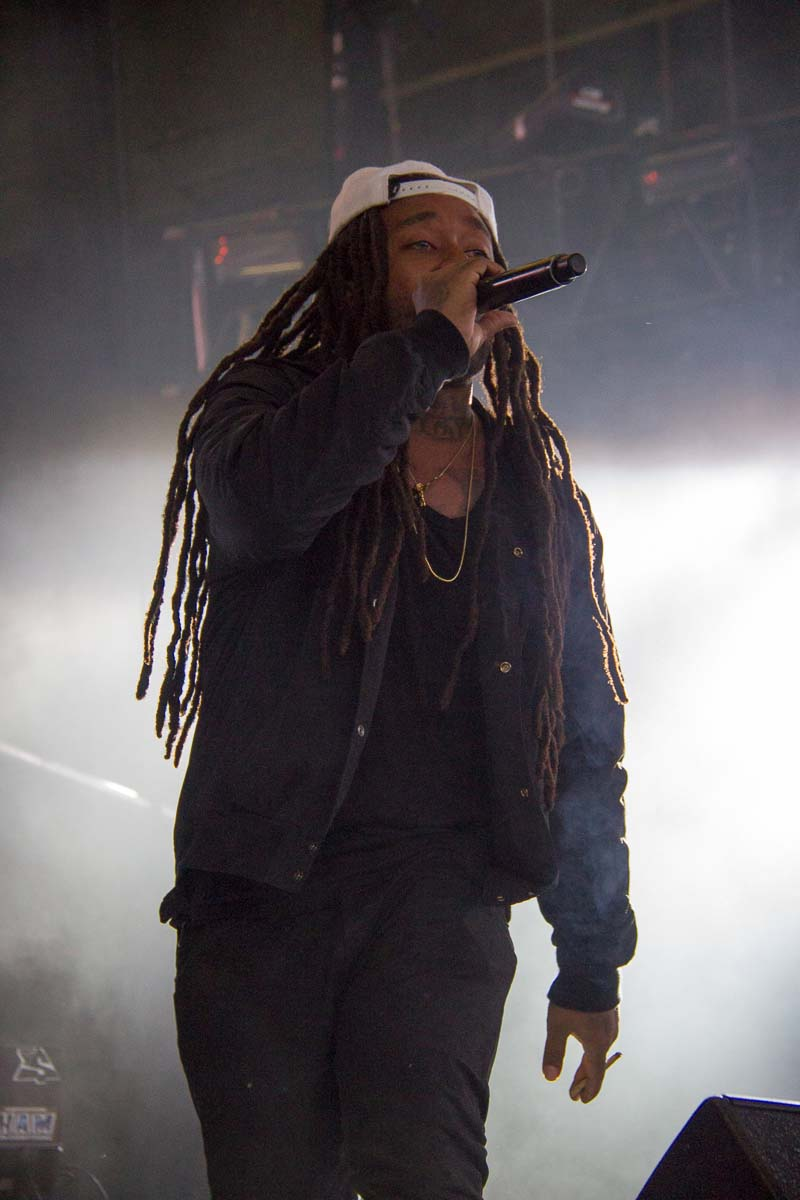
Griffin in November 2014

On February 23, 2014, Griffin revealed that his first full-length major label album would be titled Free TC, and would be released during the third quarter of 2014. He told Revolt, that he had already completed eight songs for the album and that he would be going on tour with Wiz Khalifa during 2014. He was chosen for the 2014 XXL Freshman Class. In May 2014, Griffin told The Fader, that he would release a mixtape, titled Sign Language, sometime during the next few months, which would then be followed by Free TC. In August 2014, Griffin revealed that Jeremih, Wiz Khalifa, YG, Yo Gotti, and Jay 305, would be appearing on Sign Language. At the same time, Griffin was working with Rihanna on her 2015 hit single "FourFiveSeconds", receiving writing credit.

Griffin appeared on Chris Brown and Tyga's Fan of a Fan: The Album, on the second track "Nothin' Like Me", as well as Big Sean's song "Play No Games" off of Dark Sky Paradise. On May 26, 2015, Griffin released the first single from Free TC, titled "Only Right", which features TeeCee4800, Joe Moses, and YG, and was produced by DJ Mustard. On June 26, 2015, he released the album's second single, titled "Blasé" (featuring Future and Rae Sremmurd), which would go on to receive Platinum certification. A pre-order promotional single, "When I See Ya" (featuring Fetty Wap), was released in September 2015, preceding album's third single, "Saved" (featuring E-40), which was certified Gold.

Griffin revealed that on October 13, 2015, exactly one month before his album came out, he would release a new mixtape Airplane Mode. Free TC was released on November 13, 2015, via Atlantic Records. The album debuted at number 14 on the Billboard 200, with 31,000 album-equivalent units and first-week sales of 22,000 copies in the United States. In February 2016, Griffin guest featured on Fifth Harmony's hit single "Work from Home", which peaked at number 4 on the Billboard Hot 100. In June 2016, Griffin, Lil Wayne, Wiz Khalifa, Imagine Dragons, Logic, and X Ambassadors released the collaboration single "Sucker for Pain" for the motion picture soundtrack for Suicide Squad. In August 2016, Griffin and Nick Jonas performed the song "Bacon" at the 2016 MTV Video Music Awards, where Griffin also won Best Collaboration for "Work from Home" with Fifth Harmony. On September 23, 2016, Griffin released a project titled Campaign, which peaked at number 28 on the Billboard 200.

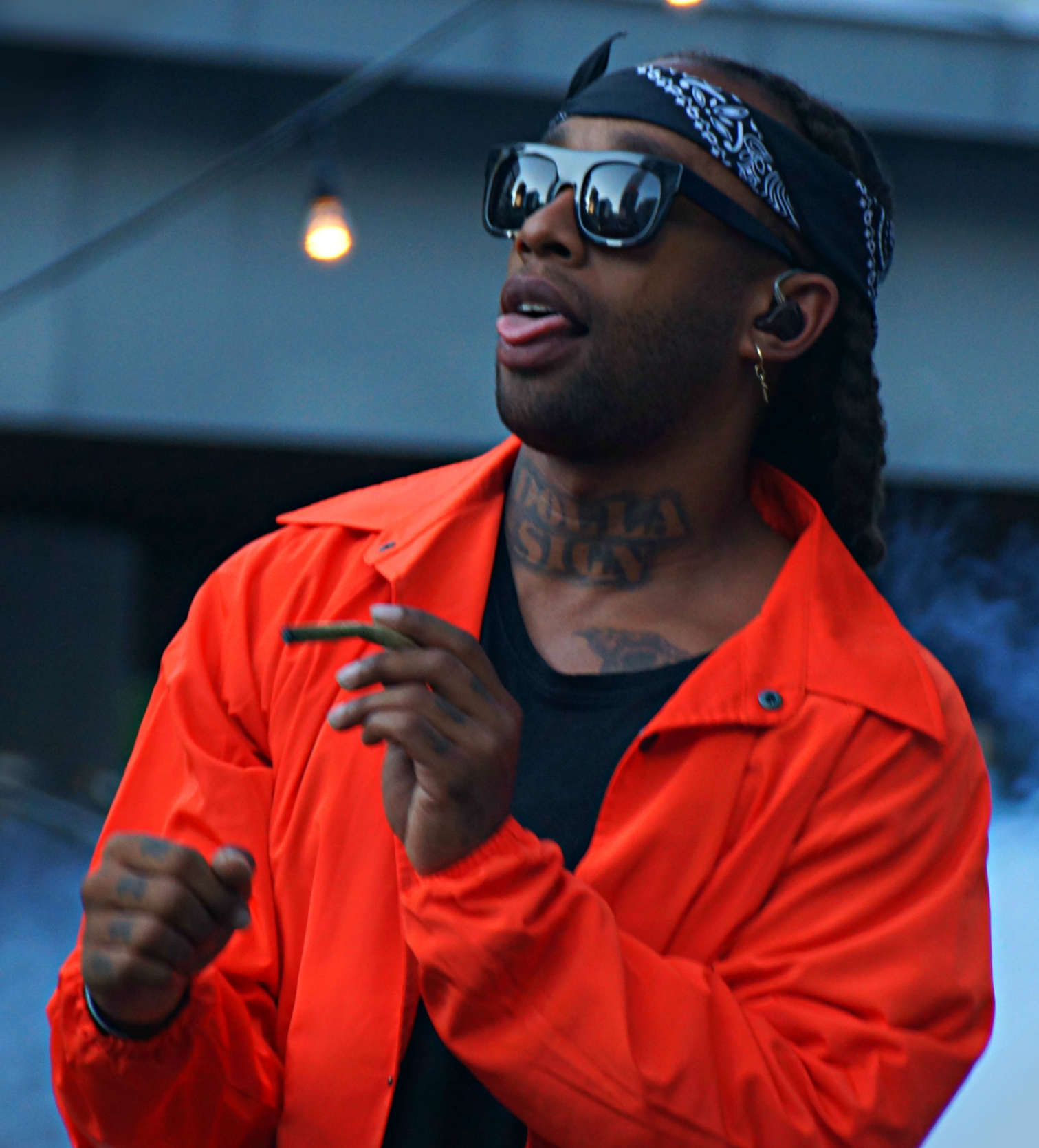
Griffin performing at Yonge–Dundas Square (now Sankofa Square) in Toronto, 2015

=== 2016–2018: Beach House 3 and MihTy ===
On June 19, 2016, Griffin announced that his next project following Campaign would be Beach House 3 and that this installment would be an album rather than a mixtape. The lead single "Love U Better" (featuring Lil Wayne and The-Dream) was released July 10, 2017. The second single "So Am I" (featuring Damian Marley and Skrillex) was released on September 1, 2017. The album was released on October 27, 2017, and debuted at number 11 on the Billboard 200.

In February 2018, Griffin was featured on Post Malone's single "Psycho", which peaked at number one on the Billboard Hot 100. In May 2018, he was featured on Christina Aguilera's single "Accelerate" along with 2 Chainz, the first single from Aguilera's eighth album Liberation. On June 1, he was featured on "All Mine" by Kanye West on West's album Ye. On June 8, he was featured on "Freeee (Ghost Town, Pt. 2)" by Kids See Ghosts, on their self-titled album. On June 14, he was featured on Bhad Bhabie's single "Trust Me". On June 16, he was featured on the song "Boss" from Beyoncé and Jay-Z's joint album Everything Is Love. In 2018, he was featured on Tinashe's single "Me So Bad" with French Montana, which had moderate success in Japan, Australia, and New Zealand. He was also featured on Drake's album, Scorpion, on the song "After Dark". He also featured on Lecrae's album All Things Work Together on the song "Blessings".

On October 26, 2018, Griffin and Jeremih released a collaborative album under the joint pseudonym MihTy (a portmanteau of both the artists' names) through Def Jam Recordings and Atlantic Records, their respective labels. The duo's eponymous album was released to mild critical and commercial reception, and featured guest appearances from French Montana, Chris Brown, and Wiz Khalifa, and executive production from Hitmaka. The duo had released several singles throughout the fall season of 2018 in anticipation of the album's release and performed "The Light" on Jimmy Kimmel Live! in the week leading up to the album's debut. The project included the singles "The Light" and "Goin Thru Some Thangs".

=== 2019–2022: Featuring Ty Dolla Sign and Cheers to the Best Memories ===
Griffin released an album preview in February 2019 (via Instagram) featuring a new song produced by D.A. Got That Dope along with a verse from Tyga. On May 20, 2019, Griffin released the single "Purple Emoji" (featuring J. Cole) as the intended first single. On August 9, 2019, he released another single titled "Hottest in the City" (featuring Juicy J and Project Pat). He later announced that his third studio album was originally called Tyrone (named from his birth name) and was set to release fall 2019. However, he stated, "I had a meeting one time with Kanye, and played him the album, and he was like, 'Bro nah, you need to do what you do. Add more bass, add more drums, add more, the real shit, that's what no one else is doing. Be the best you, bring that shit all the way up to the forefront...That conversation definitely inspired me, and made me go back and go crazy with the live instruments".

On July 1, 2020, Griffin released "Ego Death" (featuring Kanye West, FKA Twigs, and Skrillex) as the official lead single to his third studio album. On July 3, 2020, Griffin announced to Big Boy that his third studio album is called Dream House and would be released "sooner than you think". The second single "Expensive" (featuring Nicki Minaj) was released on August 28, 2020. On October 14, Griffin revealed that he changed the album's title to Featuring Ty Dolla Sign, a reference to his work on other artists' projects and songs since his last release. He said the album title came from his gift of collaborating, and features many of his industry friends.

Featuring Ty Dolla Sign was released on October 23, 2020. The album features artists including Kid Cudi, Post Malone, Kanye West, Anderson .Paak, Quavo, Lil Durk, Nicki Minaj, Big Sean, Jhené Aiko, Kehlani, Future, Musiq Soulchild, FKA Twigs, and Skrillex. Griffin was also featured on the song "Safety Net" by Ariana Grande for her sixth studio album, Positions on October 30, 2020.

On August 11, 2021, Griffin and Canadian R&B duo Dvsn posted the artwork from a forthcoming collaborative album titled Cheers to the Best Memories to their respective Instagram pages, captioned with the release date of August 20, 2021. The album featured Rauw Alejandro and Griffin's longtime associate YG, as well as a posthumous guest appearance from Mac Miller, with whom Griffin had collaborated in the past. The release preceded Griffin's appearances in the following two weeks on "Junya pt 2" from Kanye West's Donda and "Get Along Better" from Drake's Certified Lover Boy.

=== 2023–present: ¥$, Vultures trilogy and Tycoon ===
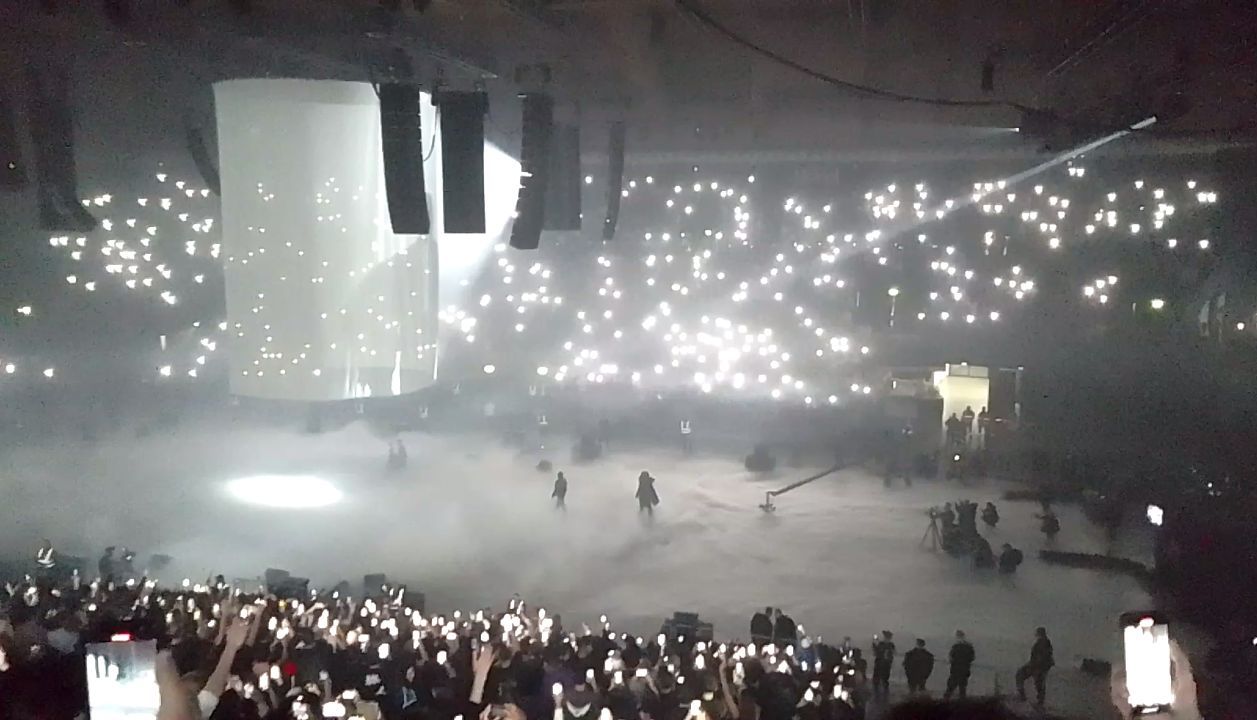
¥$ listening party in Bologna, Italy, for Vultures 1 (2024)

In October 2023, Griffin announced a collaborative project between him and frequent collaborator Kanye West via social media, accompanied by a "multi-stadium" listening event in the following month. It was reported earlier in the month that he and West were shopping for distributors for the album, as West is an independent artist. The duo, referred to as "¥$", originally planned for a collaborative project in 2016. The event failed to materialize, although their debut collaborative single under the recording outfit, "Vultures" (featuring Bump J) was released on November 22, 2023. The following day, a version of the song with an additional verse from Lil Durk was released. Amidst numerous delays, Vultures 1, the first album of a planned trilogy, released on February 10, 2024. The album debuted at number one on the Billboard 200, becoming West's eleventh and Griffin's first respective number one album on the chart in their careers. After months of delays, Vultures 2 released on August 3, 2024.

On January 25, 2025, during an interview, Griffin revealed that Vultures 3 is "on the way" and his fourth solo album, titled Tycoon will also be releasing soon. On February 7, the initial lead single off Tycoon (before being removed from the project), titled "Wheels Fall Off", was first teased with a behind the scenes music video shooting in Los Angeles where rappers Kanye West and the Game were present, it was later released through yeezy.com, with two different versions, labeled "WFO – 01" and "WFO – 02", and subsequently through streaming platforms. The song features West, who also produced it alongside Kobe "BbyKobe" Hood and Darhyl Camper. Griffin contributed to West's 2026 album Bully, co-writing the songs "Last Breath", "Bully", and "Highs and Lows". Griffin was featured on South Korean girl group Aespa's song "Switchblade."

== Artistry ==
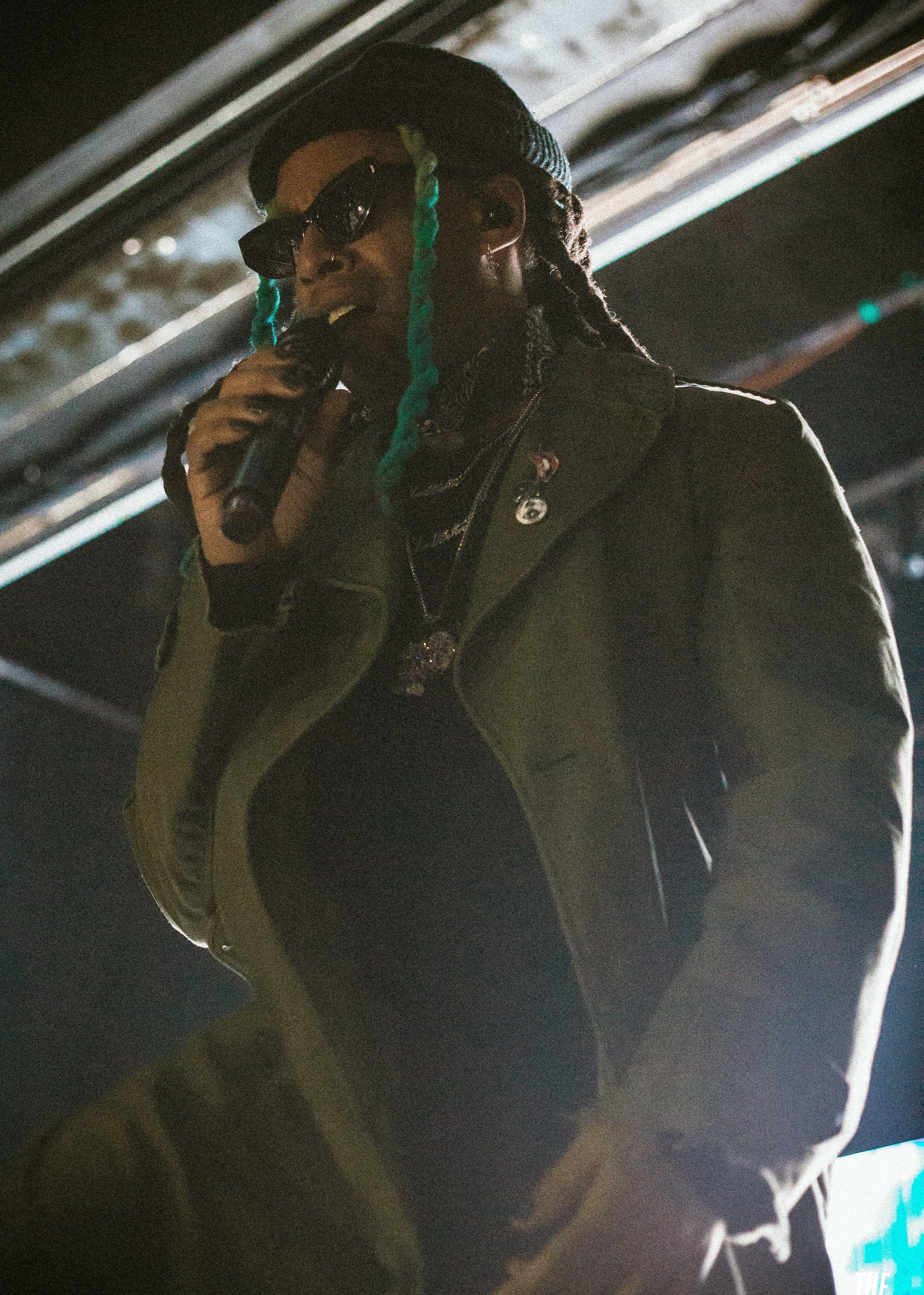
Griffin performing in March 2018

=== Musical style ===
Griffin's sound typically combines R&B and hip-hop. When asked if he was a rapper, he stated, "People would call it rap, but I really don't feel like I rap. There's so many great rappers, like if we had to battle or some shit, they would just cream me. I don't really consider myself a rapper, I just happen to have bars, or something like that. I still sing man, I'm a singer, ya feel me?"

=== Influences ===
He cited Nate Dogg and Chris Brown as main influences for his musical style. When asked about his influences, Griffin responded, "2Pac is my favorite artist of all time. I liked Slum Village a lot back then, like J Dilla, he's one of my favorite producers and artists. I'm like a hip-hop head type of dude. Mos Def, Talib Kweli, that whole Rawkus Records scene, that's my type of shit." He continued, "I also like cats like Prince. Just like his production, he's kind of like the same thing as me. He sings, he produces, he plays all types of instruments. That's what I'm after. I wouldn't wear that type of clothes or wear my hair like that. [Laughs.] But as far as artistry, that's the same type of dude I am." In an interview he revealed that Kim Burrell was his absolute favorite vocalist, and that Brandy was right there with her.

== Personal life ==
Griffin has a daughter, Jailynn (born 2005). He was in a relationship with singer Lauren Jauregui from 2017 to 2019.

Griffin is Muslim.

=== Political views ===
In 2020, Griffin formally endorsed the presidential campaign of rapper and frequent collaborator Kanye West.

== Legal issues ==
On December 10, 2018, it was revealed that Griffin was facing up to 15 years in jail in relation to cocaine and marijuana possession charges. These charges resulted from a traffic stop in Atlanta, Georgia, wherein a car with multiple people, Griffin was the only one charged with the drugs due to him being in close proximity to them. Later, all charges were dropped upon completion of a drug prevention program.

== Discography ==
Solo studio albums

- Free TC (2015)
- Beach House 3 (2017)
- Featuring Ty Dolla Sign (2020)
- Tycoon (2025)

Collaborative studio albums

- MihTy (with Jeremih as MihTy) (2018)
- Cheers to the Best Memories (with Dvsn) (2021)
- Vultures 1 (with Kanye West as ¥$) (2024)
- Vultures 2 (with Kanye West as ¥$) (2024)
- Vultures 3 (with Kanye West as ¥$) (TBA)

== Filmography ==
Year	Title	Role	Notes
2011	Holland in da Hood	Cameo	TV series
2022	Entergalactic	Ky (voice)	Television special
2026	Rolling Loud	Himself	

== Awards and nominations ==
Year	Awards	Nominated work	Category	Result
2016	Premios Juventud	"Work from Home" (with Fifth Harmony)	Favorite Hit	Nominated
2016	Teen Choice Awards	"Work from Home" (with Fifth Harmony)	Choice Summer Song	Won
2016	MTV Video Music Awards	"Work from Home" (with Fifth Harmony)	Best Collaboration	Won
2016	American Music Awards	"Work from Home" (with Fifth Harmony)	Collaboration of the Year	Won
2017	iHeartRadio Music Awards	"Work from Home" (with Fifth Harmony)	Best Music Video	Won
2017	Kids' Choice Awards	"Work from Home" (with Fifth Harmony)	Favorite Song	Won
2017	MTV Video Music Awards	"Gone" (with Afrojack)	Best Dance Video	Nominated
2017	BET Hip Hop Awards	"Ain't Nothing"	Best Featured Verse	Nominated
2017	BET Hip Hop Awards	"Blessings" (Lecrae featuring Ty Dolla Sign)	Impact Track	Nominated
2018	GMA Dove Awards	"Blessings" (Lecrae featuring Ty Dolla Sign)	Song of the Year	Nominated
2018	iHeartRadio Titanium Awards	"Psycho" (with Post Malone)	1 Billion Total Audience Spins on iHeartRadio Stations	Won
2019	MTV Video Music Awards	"Hot Girl Summer" (with Megan Thee Stallion and Nicki Minaj)	Best Power Anthem	Won
2020	Grammy Awards	"Midnight Hour" (with Skrillex and Boys Noize)	Best Dance Recording	Nominated
2021	Grammy Awards	"All I Need" (with Jacob Collier and Mahalia)	Best R&B Performance	Nominated
2022	Grammy Awards	Back of My Mind (H.E.R.; as featured artist)	Album of the Year	Nominated
2022	Grammy Awards	Donda (Kanye West; as featured artist)	Album of the Year	Nominated
2022	Grammy Awards	"WusYaName" (with Tyler, the Creator and YoungBoy Never Broke Again)	Best Melodic Rap Performance	Nominated
2025	Grammy Awards	"Carnival" (with Kanye West, Rich the Kid, and Playboi Carti)	Best Rap Song	Nominated
2026	Grammy Awards	"Wholeheartedly" (with JID and 6lack)	Best Melodic Rap Performance	Pending
