= B.o.B production discography =

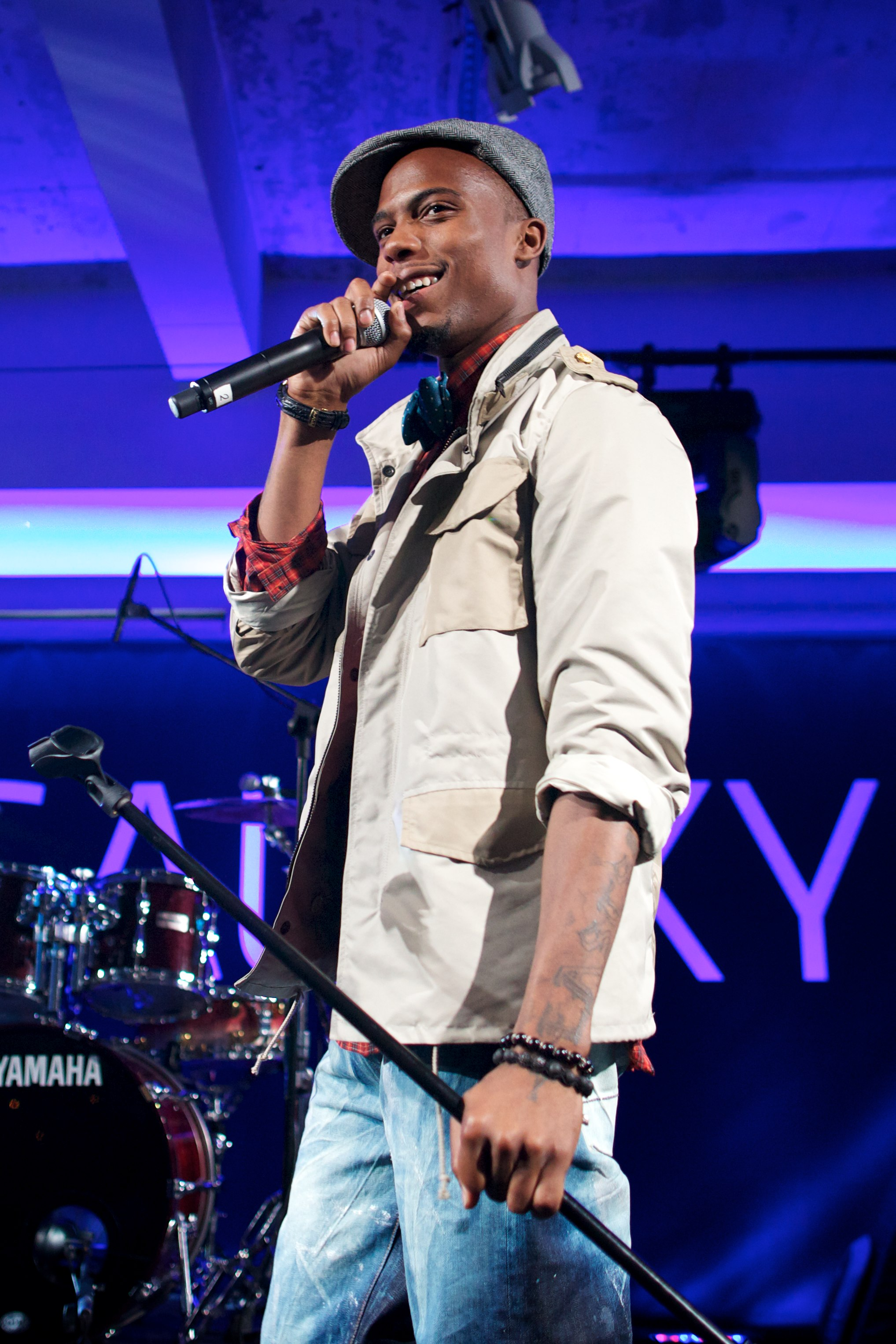
B.o.B in 2010

The following list is a discography of production by American hip hop recording artist B.o.B. It includes a list of songs produced, co-produced and remixed by year, artist, album and title.

== Singles produced ==
2010

- "Don't Let Me Fall" (B.o.B)

2011

- "I'll Be in the Sky" (B.o.B)

2012

- "Am I a Psycho" (Tech N9ne featuring Hopsin & B.o.B)
- "Where Are You (B.o.B vs. Bobby Ray)" (B.o.B)
- "So Hard to Breathe" (B.o.B)

== 2002 ==
=== Citty ===
- 00. "I'm the Cookie Man"

== 2008 ==
=== B.o.B - Hi! My Name Is B.o.B ===
- 02. "What the Fuck"
- 17. "Don't Be Afraid"
- 20. "Do Anything" (produced with Jim Jonsin)
- 21. "One Day"
- 30. "Better Off Alone"
- 32. "They Keep Crying"
- 33. "Just a Dream"
- 35. "Middle of the Day" (produced with Jim Jonsin)

=== B.o.B - Who the F#*k Is B.o.B? ===
- 03. "Generation Lost"
- 04. "There It Is"
- 05. "Double Bubble"
- 07. "I'll Be in the Sky"
- 08. "Service with a Smile"
- 12. "East-Side Tales"
- 16. "Lonely People" (produced with Jim Jonsin)
  - Sample Credit: The Beatles - "Eleanor Rigby"
- 17. "Use Ur Love" (produced with Jim Jonsin)
- 18. "Nigger"
- 19. "Starship Strobelight" (produced with Jim Jonsin)

== 2009 ==
=== B.o.B - B.o.B vs. Bobby Ray ===
- 06. "Do You Have the Stamina" (featuring Kanye West)
  - Sample Credit: Kanye West - "Pinocchio Story"
- 10. "Voltage" (featuring Mickey Factz & Playboy Tre)
- 12. "Satellite"
- 14. "Mr. Bobby"
- 15. "Trippin'"
- 16. "Goodnite"
- 17. "Camera"
- 18. "No Man's Land"
- 19. "Put Me On"
- 20. "Already There"
- 21. "Fly Like Me" (produced with Red Spyda)

=== Killer Mike - Underground Atlanta ===
- 04. "Generation Lost" (performed by B.o.B)

=== Rock City - PTFAO: Independence Day ===
- 08. "Do It Slow" (featuring B.o.B)

== 2010 ==
=== Charles Hamilton ===
- 00. "Paperboy" (featuring B.o.B) (produced with Charles Hamilton, Woody and Kato)

=== B.o.B - May 25th ===
- 02. "Champion"
- 05. "Out of Time"
- 09. "The Rain"
- 12. "Don't Feel So Good"
- 13. "Cool Side"
- 12. "Fools for Love" (featuring Charles Hamilton)

=== B.o.B - B.o.B Presents: The Adventures of Bobby Ray ===
- 01. "Don't Let Me Fall"
- 03. "Past My Shades" (featuring Lupe Fiasco)
- 05. "Ghost in the Machine"
- 10. "Lovelier Than You"
- 11. "5th Dimension" (featuring Ricco Barrino) (produced with T.I. & Lil' C)
- 13. "Letters from Vietnam" (iTunes deluxe edition bonus track)

=== B.o.B - No Genre ===
- 08. "Cold as Ice" (produced with Mike Caren)
- 09. "The Watchers"
- 11. "American Dreamin'" (produced with Mike Caren)
- 15. "Attraction"

== 2011 ==
=== Tech N9ne - All 6's and 7's ===
- 03. "Am I A Psycho?" (featuring B.o.B & Hopsin)

=== B.o.B - E.P.I.C. (Every Play Is Crucial) ===
- 03. "Guest List" (featuring Roscoe Dash) (produced with Kutta)
- 04. "What Are We Doing" (produced with Jim Jonsin)

=== Spodee - No Pressure 2 ===
- 21. "Sunlight" (featuring Mitchelle'l and B.o.B) (produced with Lil' C)

== 2012 ==
=== B.o.B - Strange Clouds ===
- 01. "Bombs Away" (featuring Morgan Freeman)
- 02. "Ray Bands"
- 03. "So Hard to Breathe"
- 12. "Circles"
- 15. "Where Are You (B.o.B vs. Bobby Ray)"
- 17. "Back It Up for Bobby" (Bonus Track)
- 18. "What Are We Doing" (produced with Jim Jonsin) (Bonus Track)
- 19. "Guest List" (featuring Roscoe Dash) (produced with Kutta) (Bonus Track)

=== Waka Flocka Flame - Triple F Life: Friends, Fans & Family ===
- 07. "Fist Pump" (featuring B.o.B) (produced with Southside)

=== Iggy Azalea - Glory ===
- 03. "Runway" (featuring Pusha T)

=== B.o.B - Fuck 'Em We Ball ===
- 03. "Dynomite" (produced with Jamieson)
- 07. "Be There" (produced with Jamieson)
- 08. "Everythang" (produced with Osinachi)
- 12. "Best Friend" (featuring Iggy Azalea & Mac Miller) (produced with Jamieson)
- 14. "So Blowed" (featuring Snoop Lion)
- 15. "Spend It"
- 17. "Roll One Up"

== 2013 ==
=== Hustle Gang - G.D.O.D. (Get Dough or Die) ===
- 09. "Problems" (featuring B.o.B, T.I., Mac Boney, Problem, Trae tha Truth & Young Dro)

=== Young Dro - Day Two ===
- 11. "Groupie" (featuring B.o.B & Trinidad James)

=== Doe B - Baby Jesus ===
- 05. "Hockey Bag" (featuring B.o.B)

=== Trae tha Truth - I Am King ===
- 01. "Intro"

=== B.o.B - Underground Luxury ===
- 03. "Paper Route"
- 05. "Throwback" (featuring Chris Brown)
- 06. "Back Me Up"
- 09. "FlyMuthaFucka"
- 12. "Cranberry Moon Walk" (featuring Mike Fresh) (produced with FKi and Big Zar)
- 14. "Forever" (featuring Playboy Tre)

== 2014 ==
=== B.o.B - No Genre Pt. 2 ===
- 02. "Many Rivers"
- 06. Follow Me"
- 11. "Swing My Way" (featuring Sevyn Streeter)
- 14. Chosen (featuring T.I. & Spodee)

Leftover

- 00. "High as Hell" (featuring Wiz Khalifa)

=== Hustle Gang - G.D.O.D. II ===
- 13. "Champagne Room" (featuring Trey Songz, B.o.B, T.I., Big Kuntry King, Spodee)
- 17. "Troubled" (featuring B.o.B, Watch The Duck, T.I., Dro)

=== Kevin Gates - Luca Brasi 2 ===
- 10. "Talk on Phones"

=== B.o.B - New Black ===
- 02. "New Black"
- 03. "Generation Lost"
- 05. "Through My Head"
- 06. "Paper Route"
- 07. "Broken Bones"
- 08. "Provo King" (produced with Jaquebeatz)

== 2016 ==
=== B.o.B & Scotty ATL - We Got Tricked ===
00. "We Got Tricked"
