= Aeroplane (disambiguation) =

The term aeroplane (equivalent to "airplane" in U.S. English) typically refers to any powered fixed-wing aircraft.

Aeroplane may also refer to:

== In music ==
=== Performers ===
- Aeroplane (musician) (Vito De Luca), a Belgian nu-disco musician
- The Aeroplanes, an English rock band from Liverpool

=== Recordings ===
- Aeroplane (album), a 1999 album by Curt Smith
- "Aeroplane" (song), a song by Red Hot Chili Peppers from their 1995 album, One Hot Minute
- "Aeroplane", a song by Robert Palmer from the 1990 album Don't Explain
- "Aeroplane", a song by Björk from her 1993 album Debut
- "Aeroplane", a song by Imogen Heap from the 1998 album iMegaphone
- "Aeroplane", a song by Reamonn from the 2008 album Reamonn
- "Aeroplanes", a song by Carly Rae Jepsen from the 2023 album The Loveliest Time

== Other uses ==
- Aeroplane Jelly, an Australian brand of gelatin dessert
- Phaedyma shepherdi, or the Common Aeroplane, a medium-sized butterfly
- Aeroplane (magazine), a British magazine devoted to aviation history and preservation

== See also ==
- Aircraft
- Airplane (disambiguation)
