= Airplane (disambiguation) =

The term airplane (equivalent to "aeroplane" in non-US English) typically refers to any powered fixed-wing aircraft.

Airplane(s) may also refer to:

== Film and television ==
=== Films ===
- Airplane!, a 1980 American comedy film
- Airplane II: The Sequel, the 1982 sequel to the above film

=== Television episodes ===
- "Airplane", a 2016 episode of Darr Sabko Lagta Hai
- "Airplane", a 1999 episode of G vs E
- "Airplane", a 1966 episode of Roger Ramjet
- "Airplane!", a 2000 episode of Spin City
- "Airplane!", a 2020 episode of The Goldbergs
- "Airplane", a 2004 episode of Whoopi

== Music ==
- Jefferson Airplane, often referred to as "the Airplane", an American rock music band
- Airplane (album), a 1998 album by Arvingarna
- Airplane (EP), a 1998 EP by Rusted Root
- "Airplane", a song by Baboon from their 2006 self-titled album
- "Airplane", a 1977 song by The Beach Boys from their album Love You
- "Airplane", a 2024 song by BXB from their album Chapter 2. Wings
- "Airplane", a 2013 song by f(x) from their album Pink Tape
- "Airplane", a 2010 song by Plain White T's from their album Wonders of the Younger
- "Airplanes", a 2015 song by 5 Seconds of Summer from their album Sounds Good Feels Good
- "Airplanes" (song), a 2010 song by B.o.B featuring Hayley Williams
- "Airplanes", a 2009 song by Local Natives

== Others ==
- Airplane Chefs, a 2020 game of Nordcurrent

== See also ==
- Aeroplane (disambiguation)
- Aircraft
