= Cold Shoulder (disambiguation) =

Cold shoulder is an English expression.

Cold Shoulder may also refer to:

- "Cold Shoulder" (Adele song), 2008
- "Cold Shoulder" (Drake song), 2026
- "Cold Shoulder", an episode of G.I. Joe: A Real American Hero
- "Cold Shoulder", a 1985 song by Evelyn Thomas
- "Cold Shoulder", a 2022 song by Central Cee
- "Cold Shoulder", a song by Culture Club from the 1999 album Don't Mind If I Do
- "Cold Shoulder", a song by Garth Brooks from the 1991 album Ropin' the Wind
- "Cold Shoulder", a 2022 song by Gucci Mane featuring YoungBoy Never Broke Again from the 2018 album Evil Genius
- "Cold Shoulder", a song by Johnny Cash from the 1958 album The Fabulous Johnny Cash
- "Cold Shoulder", a song by Josh Turner from the 2012 album Punching Bag
- "Cold Shoulder", a song by N-Dubz from the 2010 album Love.Live.Life
- "Cold Shoulder", a song by Squeeze from the 1993 album Some Fantastic Place
- "Cold Shoulder", a song by Uncle Tupelo from the 1991 album Still Feel Gone
- Cold Shoulder, a backing band formed by previous members of the Aeroplanes
