= Magic (B.o.B song) =

2010 single by B.o.B

Single by B.o.B featuring Rivers Cuomo

from the album B.o.B Presents: The Adventures of Bobby Ray
- Released: July 6, 2010
- Studio: MaGik Studio
- Genre: Pop rap; pop punk; electropop; dance pop; rap rock
- Length: 3:16
- Label: Grand Hustle; Rebel Rock; Atlantic
- Songwriters: Bobby Simmons; Rivers Cuomo; Lukasz Gottwald
- Producers: Dr. Luke, Maciek Albrecht

B.o.B singles chronology
"Bet I" (2010)	"Magic" (2010)	"So High" (2010)

Rivers Cuomo singles chronology
"Magic" (2010)	"Can't Keep My Hands off You" (2011)

Music video
- "Magic" on YouTube

"Magic" is a song by American hip hop recording artist B.o.B, released on June 7, 2010, as the fifth single from his debut studio album B.o.B Presents: The Adventures of Bobby Ray (2010). The track features Weezer's lead singer, Rivers Cuomo, singing the chorus. It was written by both artists, alongside the song's producer Dr. Luke, who produced the track alongside Maciek Albrecht, and was recorded at MaGik Studio.

Upon its release, the song received mixed reviews from music critics, but peaked at number 10 on the Billboard Hot 100, alongside making the top 10 in charts based in Australia, Netherlands, New Zealand, and the United Kingdom, where the song would make Radio 1's B-Playlist. The song's music video was released on the September 3rd, and features B.o.B. trying to wake up from a dream. A sequel to the song, "Magik 2.0", was released by Becky G and Austin Mahone.

== Composition ==
"Magic", a hip hop song, is written in the key of B major with a tempo of 82 beats per minute in common time. The song follows a chord progression of B5–E5–G♯5–F♯5, and the vocals in the song span from D♯_{3} to F♯_{4}.

== Reception ==
Despite mixed reviews, the song progressed up and down the Billboard Hot 100 chart, reaching number 10 at its peak. Billboard gave it a positive review, saying, "The song's strongest force is an infectious, throbbing synth-guitar hook from Dr. Luke, who seamlessly fuses B.o.B's verses with a chorus by Weezer frontman Rivers Cuomo that demands a singalong. The result is stellar." The reviewer at TinyMixtapes.com said that "'Magic' is magnificently, triumphantly corny, enough to give Steve Miller and that guy from The Outfield a run for their money. 'Magic' isn't good by any stretch of the imagination, but it is goofily enjoyable."

In his album review for Spin, Kenny Herzog wrote, "The Adventures of Bobby Ray is a hip-hop Scary Movie, tossing off references (Vampire Weekend sample, Rivers Cuomo cameo) while struggling to establish a distinctive identity." Pitchfork questioned "the appearance by Weezer's Rivers Cuomo, whose creepily blank vocals on 'Magic' sound like the engineer has a gun to his head". The Guardian's Paul MacInnes wrote that "all the Chris Martinesque piano lines and calibrated guest appearances – from Weezer's River Cuomo to Janelle Monáe – can't obscure an absence of soul throughout."

== Music video ==
B.o.B (right) in the music video

The music video was released on MTV at midnight on September 3, 2010. The video features B.o.B trying to wake himself up from a dream. He also performs with Rivers Cuomo on a stage at a wild party. In addition, Paul Iacono from the MTV show The Hard Times of RJ Berger is featured dancing on stage. The video was directed by Sanaa Hamri.

== Track listing ==
1. "Magic" - 3:16
2. "Mellow Fellow" - 2:58

== Charts ==
=== Weekly charts ===
Chart (2010)	Peak position
Australia (ARIA)	5
Canada Hot 100 (Billboard)	17
European Hot 100 Singles	47
Ireland (IRMA)	16
Netherlands (Dutch Top 40)	6
Netherlands (Single Top 100)	29
New Zealand (Recorded Music NZ)	6
Scottish Singles Sales (Official Charts)	17
Sweden (Sverigetopplistan)	53
UK Singles (Official Charts)	16
UK Hip Hop/R&B (Official Charts)	2
US Billboard Hot 100	10
US Hot Rap Songs (Billboard)	25
US Pop Airplay (Billboard)	12
US Rhythmic Airplay (Billboard)	30

=== Year-end charts ===
Chart (2010)	Position
Australia (ARIA)	44
Canada (Canadian Hot 100)	82
Netherlands (Dutch Top 40)	87
New Zealand (RMNZ)	49
UK Singles (Official Charts Company)	124
US Billboard Hot 100	63

== Certifications ==
Region	Certification	Certified units/sales
Australia (ARIA)	2× Platinum	140,000^{^}
Canada (Music Canada)	Platinum	80,000^{*}
New Zealand (RMNZ)	Gold	7,500^{*}
United Kingdom (BPI)	Gold	400,000^{‡}
United States (RIAA)	3× Platinum	3,000,000^{‡}
^{*} Sales figures based on certification alone.^{^} Shipments figures based on certification alone.^{‡} Sales+streaming figures based on certification alone.

== In other media ==
- The Treblemakers, an all-male a cappella group in Pitch Perfect, sang the song in their finale performance.
- Becky G recorded a new version of the song for The Smurfs 2 soundtrack called "Magik 2.0", featuring singer Austin Mahone. It was produced by A.C.
