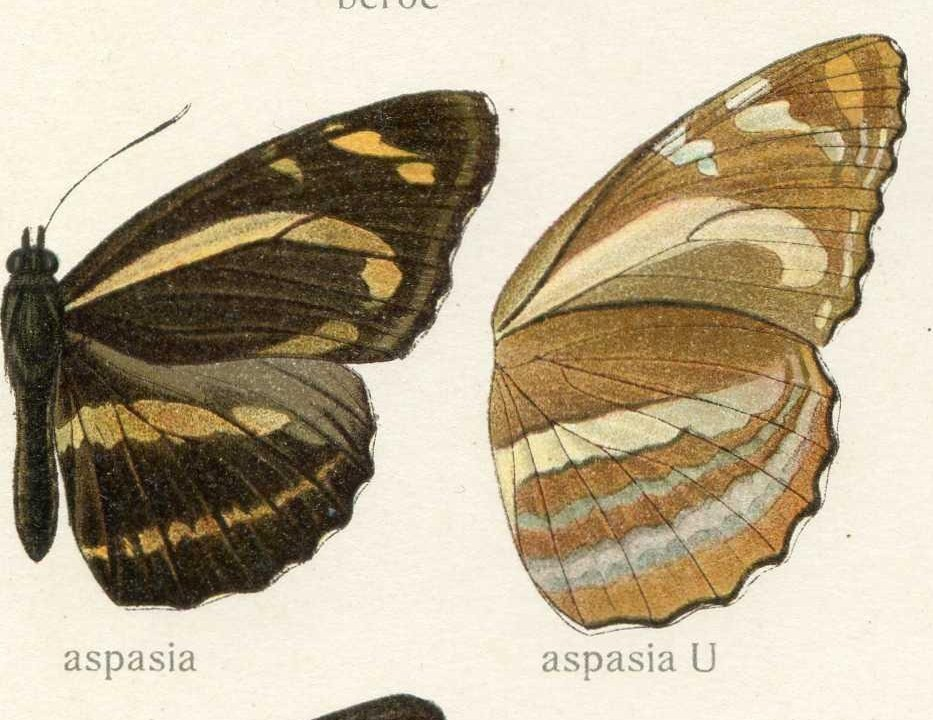
- Phaedyma aspasia

Scientific classification
- Domain: Eukaryota
- Kingdom: Animalia
- Phylum: Arthropoda
- Class: Insecta
- Order: Lepidoptera
- Family: Nymphalidae
- Tribe: Neptini
- Genus: Phaedyma; Felder, 1861

Species
- See text

Synonyms
- Andrapana Moore, 1898; Andrapana Moore, [1899]; Andasenodes Moore, 1898; Andasenodes Moore, [1899]

= Phaedyma =

Genus of brush-footed butterflies

Phaedyma is a genus of Asian butterflies distributed from India to New Guinea and the Bismarck Archipelago. They resemble Neptis species but are larger.

== Species ==
- Phaedyma amphion (Linnaeus, 1758)
- Phaedyma ampliata (Butler, 1882)
- Phaedyma aspasia (Leech, 1890)
- Phaedyma chinga Eliot, 1969
- Phaedyma columella (Cramer, [1780])
- Phaedyma daria C. & R. Felder, [1867]
- Phaedyma fissizonata (Butler, 1882)
- Phaedyma heliopolis C. & R. Felder, [1867]
- Phaedyma mimetica (Grose-Smith, 1895)
- Phaedyma shepherdi (Moore, 1858)
