= Nothin' on You =

2009 single by B.o.B featuring Bruno Mars

Single by B.o.B featuring Bruno Mars

from the album B.o.B Presents: The Adventures of Bobby Ray
- B-side: "Airplanes"
- Released: December 15, 2009
- Recorded: 2009
- Genre: Pop rap; R&B; Southern hip-hop
- Length: 4:29 (album version); 3:42 (radio edit)
- Label: Rebel Rock; Grand Hustle; Atlantic
- Songwriters: Bobby Simmons, Jr.; Bruno Mars; Philip Lawrence; Ari Levine
- Producer: The Smeezingtons

B.o.B singles chronology
"I'll Be in the Sky" (2008)	"Nothin' on You" (2009)	"Don't Go There" (2010)

Bruno Mars singles chronology
"Nothin' on You" (2009)	"Billionaire" (2010)

Music video
- "Nothin' on You" on YouTube

"Nothin' on You" is a song by American rapper B.o.B, featuring American singer-songwriter Bruno Mars. It was released by Rebel Rock, Grand Hustle, and Atlantic Records on December 15, 2009, as the lead single from B.o.B's debut studio album, B.o.B Presents: The Adventures of Bobby Ray (2010). The track was written by B.o.B, Mars, Philip Lawrence, and Ari Levine, with the latter three producing it as the Smeezingtons. "Nothin' on You" was initially written for Lupe Fiasco, but Atlantic Records's chairman, Craig Kallman, gave it to B.o.B after being displeased with Fiasco's version. The song took several months to finish and was born from a hummed melody by Mars and Lawrence.

"Nothin' on You" is a pop rap, R&B and Southern hip hop ballad. Some music critics praised its sweetness and positive vibe, while a few criticized Mars' performance. Lyrically, the song aims at a woman's heart with flattery. The song peaked several worldwide music charts, including its native United States and the United Kingdom, and peaked at number the three and five in Australia and New Zealand, respectively, and the top ten in Canada. It was certified six times platinum by the Recording Industry Association of America (RIAA), triple platinum by Recorded Music NZ (RMNZ), and once by Australian Recording Industry Association (ARIA) and Music Canada (MC). It was Billboard magazine's number-one rap song of the year, taking the top spot on its 2010 year-end rap chart.

The music video, directed by Ethan Lader, was filmed in Los Angeles. It features cutout animation, which takes multiple collages and taps them one over each other, in this case depicting various women. The video is interpolated with footage of the performers playing instruments along with Lawrence. The track has been covered by various recording artists and parodied by "Weird Al" Yankovic. It was nominated for Record of the Year, Best Rap Song and Best Rap/Sung Collaboration at the 53rd Grammy Awards. The song was performed live at The Ellen DeGeneres Show and at the 2010 MTV Video Music Awards. Both artists have promoted it during several of their respective tours.

== Background and production ==
During the summer of 2009, the Smeezingtons were booked for a week of writing sessions for Lupe Fiasco, B.o.B and Travie McCoy. Bruno Mars and Philip Lawrence usually hummed melodies, while Aaron Bay-Schuck, former Atlantic A&R, encouraged both of them to develop the best of those melodies, such as "Nothin' on You" and "Billionaire". In the beginning, they only had scratch chorus demos of "Nothin' on You" and "Billionaire", with a guitar on the backing track and Mars singing on top of it. In an interview to MTV News Mars and Lawrence explained how the song was created. "Me and Phil always had that hook", said Mars; "It was a different melody at first, though," Lawrence added. In 2013, during an interview with Rolling Stone, Mars revealed he took inspiration from Prince's "The Most Beautiful Girl in the World" (1994) for the hook. The instrumental of the song was composed when Ari Levine programmed the drums, based on an old-school hip-hop beat. When Mars heard it, he started playing the piano and "Magically, that melody worked with this track we were doing", the latter explained. "Nothin' on You" was finished a few months later, around November, with B.o.B working with the Smeezingtons to shape it. It was recorded with different arrangements.

Initially, Mars was not supposed to feature on the hook, but his "charisma" when singing it, made the label want to keep his voice after he recorded the final version. However, when "Nothin' on You" was being shown to different music industry decision-makers, one of them tried to give the song to a "blue-eyed blonde" artist instead of Mars, due to his race. That experience made the singer reach his lowest point so far in his career. Mars concluded, "Even with that song in my back pocket to seal the deal, things like that are coming out of people's mouths. It made me feel like I wasn't even in the room." According to American record producer Jim Jonsin, Atlantic Records' chairman, Craig Kallman, wanted him to work on the track for Lupe Fiasco. However, Jonsin pressured Kallman to give the song to B.o.B. Fiasco stated that Kallman told him his lyrics and performance on the record were "wack". Fiasco claimed the repeated denigration from the label drove him to a breaking point. Afterwards, his verses were removed and new ones were written by Mars and B.o.B. An unmixed version of the song with Fiasco and Mars's vocals leaked later in the same year. B.o.B. wrote his rendition with Mars, Lawrence, and Levine, who also handled production as the Smeezintons. Levine and Mars played all the instruments on the track, with Brody Brown playing the bass. Levine recorded, engineered and mixed the song at Levcon Studios in California. It was mastered by Chris Gehringer at Sterling Sound, NYC.

== Release ==
"Nothin' on You" was first available to listen in late November 2009. However, it was released as an official single in the United States via digital download on December 15, 2009, by Atlantic Records. American rhythmic contemporary radios began adding the track onto their playlists on February 2, 2010, being released under Atlantic Records and Grand Hustle. On March 26, "Nothin' on You" was issued for radio airplay in Italy by Warner Music Group. BBC Radio 1Xtra added a remix of the song onto their playlists featuring American rapper Big Boi on April 9, 2010.

On May 14, 2010, an EP of the song, containing the album version of the song, a remix and its respective radio cut, an instrumental and a cappella of the original version, was issued in several countries. On May 17, 2010, the radio version of "Nothin' on You" was released in the UK via digital download by Atlantic Records, as well as on CD single, which also contained B.o.B's "Haterz Everywhere" featuring Wes Fif. The same CD single was also made available in Germany on May 21, 2010. On June 15, 2010, the song was released in South Korea with Jay Park's vocals, instead of Mars's verses, by Warner Music Group Asia Pacific. In 2010, a 12" single containing different versions of "Nothin' on You" and "Airplanes" was issued by Atlantic Records in the United States. The song was also included on Mars's first compilation album, Collaborations (2026).

== Composition and influences ==
"Nothin' on You" (2010)
A 25-second sample of the chorus of "Nothin' on You" with Bruno Mars accompanied by a Jim Jonsin-helmed beat

"Nothin' on You" has been described as a pop rap, R&B and Southern hip hop ballad. It has been described as "slow" and "lulling", having an "uplifting melody". Pitchfork's Jayson Greene said the whole album sounds "sticky-sweet" for "modern-rock radio", including "Nothin' on You". Angus Batey from The Guardian called the recording "glorious, euphoric, essentially old-fashioned kind of love song". The track is backed by a "Jim Jonsin-helmed beat". Sheet music for this song shows the key of B♭ major, with a chord progression of E♭_{9}–Cm_{9}–Dm–F, and a tempo of 104 beats per minute. B.o.B and Mars's vocals span from F_{4} to B♭_{5}.

Lyrically, the song describes B.o.B throwing away his old habits and telling the girl he loves he wants to "settle down", while flattering her. Ashley Lyle from Billboard said that Mars "reassures his lady that there's no one like her" with the verses "I could be chasing, but my time would be wasted". B.o.B, during his verses, makes references appealing not only to younger supporters, "Just like that, girl, you got me froze/ Like a Nintendo 64", but also to older admirers, "Baby you the whole package, plus you pay your taxes". David Jeffries said that the rapper "courts the ladies" on the song along with Mars. He added that B.o.B transmitted his "positive vibes" on "Nothin' on You". B.o.B compared the song's "spirit" to "Bonita Applebum" by A Tribe Called Quest. Mars stated that the lyrics are about someone, saying they come from "real-life experience, whether it's at the time or me back-tracking to how I felt at another moment."

== Reception ==
=== Critical ===
"Nothin' on You" received generally positive reviews from most music critics. Billboard's Evan J. Nabavian gave the song a 4 out of 5 stars, noting that the song explores the swell appeal "between Mars' delicately delivered melodies and B.o.B.'s Southern twang." He compared it to Lupe Fiasco's duet with Matthew Santos' "Superstar" (2007), "especially its feel-good, singalong hook". The review concluded with positive feedback for the recording's lyrics and references. The same rating was given by Nick Levine of Digital Spy. He called the track a "smash" and praised its piano and hook. Levine concluded that although it doesn't show the same class as "Empire State of Mind" (2009) by Jay-Z and Alicia Keys, "it's all so goddamn catchy you'd be a fool to give a hoot." Lee Tyler from Blues & Soul's awarded the single 8 out of 10 stars, and commented "Whilst not being content to just please the ear – B.o.B's debut single "Nothin' On You" seems ... laden with instant charisma, stopping only to refresh the parts others cannot reach of late." The critic added, "A delight from start to finish". Angus Batey thought the song would have stuck out in 2010, even without B.o.B's verses, since it is a clear departure from the "in-the-club, eyeing-up-the-booty clichés that have come to pass for romance in hip-hop".

Kenny Herzog of Spin felt "Nothin' on You" to be the only "high point" on the record and called it straightforward "buoyant R&B". David Jeffries of AllMusic began by complementing B.o.B's persona, who he says is "filled with positive vibes and he isn't above pouring on the sweetness as he courts the ladies." Jeffries found "Nothin' on You" to be "perfectly packaged for some Hollywood romantic comedy." Mike Diver from the BBC labeled the single "sweet, summertime RnB", and also said "much of this impressive set showcases a deep appreciation of one of hip hop's four elements, MCing". M.T. Richards of Slant Magazine gave "Nothin' on You" a negative review, calling it "anticlimactic" and a "slow, lulling song that sounds like it was recorded in the midst of a drab winter, and I'll take Sacha Baron Cohen's Bruno over Bruno Mars." Pitchfork's Jayson Greene shared the same opinion, dubbing it as a low moment on the album and criticized Mars's crooning as sounding like an "air-conditioned sub-Coldplay".

"Nothin' on You" was named one of the 100 best summer songs in a list compiled in 2010 by The Daily Telegraph. Becky Bain of Idolator, when comparing B.o.B's and Lupe Fiasco's versions of "Nothin' on You", noticed the lack of "audacious and energetic vocals" of the latter, as B.o.B has "more personality" on the track.

=== Accolades ===
In 2010, the song was nominated for Choice Music: Single at the 2010 Teen Choice Awards, as well as, Best Collaboration at the BET Awards 2010 and Reese's Perfect Combo Award along with Verizon People's Champ Award at the 2010 BET Hip Hop Awards. In the same year, "Nothin' on You" won the category Song of the Year at the 2010 Soul Train Music Awards. In 2011, "Nothin' on You" was nominated for Best Rap Song, Best Rap/Sung Collaboration, and Record of the Year at the 53rd Annual Grammy Awards. It was nominated for Top Rap Song at the 2011 Billboard Music Awards. The single received two awards from ASCAP, one from the Pop Music Awards as one of the Most Performed Songs and Top Rap Song from the Rhythm & Soul Music Awards.

== Commercial performance ==
=== North America ===
In the United States, "Nothin' on You" debuted at number 89 on the Billboard Hot 100, spent 28 weeks on the chart and topped it on week ending May 1, 2010. It stayed there for two consecutive weeks. The single spent 34 weeks on the Hot Rap Songs chart, peaking at number one and it also topped the Pop Songs and Rhythmic Songs, spending 22 and 29 weeks on each chart, respectively. On the Hot R&B/Hip-Hop Songs chart, the song was only able to peak at number five, on its 30 weeks spent there, in the issued date of May 29, 2010. As of December 2010, "Nothin' on You " has sold 2,668,000 copies in the US. Later, by September 2012, that number rose to 3,062,000 copies sold, which led it to be certified six times platinum by the Recording Industry Association of America (RIAA). On the Billboard Hot 100 Year-End chart and in the Billboard Hot Rap Songs, the track placed at number 11 and one, respectively. In Canada, the song didn't reciprocate the success it found in the United States, since it only charted in the top 10, with 22 weeks on its chart run. Nevertheless, it was certified platinum by Music Canada (MC), denoting 80,000 copies sold.

=== International ===
In the first week in the United Kingdom, May 29, 2010, the song topped the list, with a total of 85,333 copies, replacing Roll Deep and Jodie Connor's "Good Times" at the top of the chart. In January 2020, the British Phonographic Industry (BPI) awarded the recording a platinum plaque for track-equivalent sales of 600,000 copies. It also debuted at number one on the UK R&B chart, succeeding Jason Derulo's "Ridin' Solo". The single reached number one in the Dutch Top 40, making the Netherlands the first country where it reached the top spot on a national chart, on the issue date of April 24, 2010. It did so after eight weeks on the chart run and it was able to spend two consecutive weeks on the top. As of May 20, 2010, the song debuted at its peak position of number seven.

It charted at number 12 in Italy and received a gold plaque by the Federazione Industria Musicale Italiana (FIMI). In Australia it debuted at number 25 in the ARIA Singles Chart and six weeks later reached its highest peak, number three. It spent sixteen weeks on the Australian chart. After its success in the country, the Australian Recording Industry Association (ARIA) certified it platinum for selling 70,000 digital copies. In New Zealand, the song spent eighteen weeks on the chart and it was number five for one week. "Nothin' on You" earned triple platinum certification by the Recorded Music NZ (RIANZ). In South Korea, two versions of the song were released, one featuring Mars and another with Korean-American rapper and singer and ex-2PM member, Jay Park. Both versions reached number one on the South Korea International Singles (Gaon). On the 2010 Year End Chart list of Gaon, it was number one in South Korea.

== Music video ==
=== Background and concept ===
Filmed in Los Angeles, the music video for "Nothin' on You" was directed by Ethan Lader, and the animation process was conducted by George Rausch. The video was first shot with a white background with Lader edited it with Final Cut Pro. Afterwards, over 3,000 frames were printed onto paper. Eight people were in charge of tearing every frame by hand, which were then animated and photographed individually with a digital camera. Finally, the frames were imported back into Final Cut Pro. "We took digital stills of and keyed in after animation", Lader concluded, "It was a process and a half".

=== Development and synopsis ===
The stop-animation video is similar to the one used in "Womanizer" by Sliimy, also directed by Lander. The music video for "Nothin' on You" premiered on March 9, 2010. It features multiple collages of women taping over each other. In the video B.o.B is seen traveling the world, in cities such as London, Paris, Tokyo, Atlanta and New Orleans, searching for beautiful girls. The woman he chooses is revealed towards the end of the video. During the video there is a scene in which B.o.B plays guitar and sings, Mars plays the drums, and Philip Lawrence plays the piano. Eugena Washington, the second runner-up of America's Next Top Model, Cycle 7, appears as one of the many girls in the video. Five years after the release of the music video for "Nothin' on You", on July 10, American indie pop/rock band American Authors released a video for their song "Go Big or Go Home" with the same "paper cut-out technique". It was also directed by Lander.

=== Reception ===
Alyssa Rosenberg of The Atlantic criticized the song's video, saying that it was too "literal", since the track is "about seeing pretty girls! And there are pretty girls to be seen!. However, Rosenberg also thought the collage concept was "cute". The video was nominated at the 2011 MTV Video Music Aid Japan in the Best New Artist Video category. It was also nominated for Video of the Year at the BET Awards 2010, and Best Hip Hop Video at 2010 BET Hip Hop Awards.

== Live performance ==
B.o.B and Mars made their debut performance of "Nothin' on You" at MTV Spring Break, on March 26, 2010. Nearly a month later, on April 20, they performed the song at The Ellen DeGeneres Show. The next day, B.o.B sang it alone at SOB's in New York City. The song was also played on late-night talk show Jimmy Kimmel Live! by B.o.B and Mars, who played the guitar, backed up by a band, on May 13, 2010. Jayson Rodriguez said B.o.B was "boisterous and energetic" during the show. Becky Bain from Idolator, commenting on the Jimmy Kimmel Live! appearance, thought that despite Mars and B.o.B playing the track in several places, it still sounded "lovely". In the same year, on June 23, B.o.B performed the song at The Wendy Williams Show. A couple of days later, on June 27, B.o.B performed the song at the BET Awards pre-show. B.o.B. and Bruno Mars performed a medley of "Nothin' on You" and "Airplanes" along with Hayley Williams at the 2010 MTV Video Music Awards on September 12, 2010. On December 1, B.o.B and Mars performed the song at "Grammy Nominations Concert Live!!: Countdown to Music's Biggest Night". In the same month, the track was sung at Z100's Jingle Ball 2010. In 2011, the song was performed twice only by B.o.B, first on SXSW and then at SuperTraxx. The single was also sung during Lopez Tonight.

It was the eleventh song of Mars's debut world tour, The Doo-Wops & Hooligans Tour (2010), and eleventh on the Hooligans in Wondaland Tour (2011). It was seventh along with "If I Knew" (2014 set list) on his second world tour, The Moonshine Jungle Tour (2013–14). The single was part of some shows during the 24K Magic World Tour (2017–2018) interpolated with "It Will Rain" (2011). In 2022, Mars sung "Nothin' on You" as part of a medley during his Bruno Mars Live (2022–2024) setlist.

== Cover versions and media usage ==
In 2010, Jay Park recorded a solo cover of the track and posted it on YouTube. The effect was so strong that the original version went back to the top of iTunes. In the same year, American rapper XV's cover of the song was included in his mixtape 30 Minute Layover (2010). Dead Prez sampled the song for their 2010 mixtape with DJ Drama titled Turn Off The Radio Volume 4: Revolutionary But Gangsta Grillz. The recording is called "The Beauty Within", with additional vocals by Antonia Jenaé. The American group Boyce Avenue covered "Nothin' on You" along with Justin Timberlake and T.I.'s duet, "My Love" and "Rocketeer" by Far East Movement and Ryan Tedder; they included it in their sixth EP, Acoustic Sessions, Vol. 1, released on December 6, 2010. In 2011, South Korean girl group Wonder Girls covered "Nothin' on You". In the same year, "Weird Al" Yankovic recorded a parody of the song called "Another Tattoo", which is featured on his album Alpocalypse (2011). "Nothin' on You" is featured in the movie Just Go With It (2011). Leeteuk from the boyband Super Junior covered the song during the band's concert tour Super Show 6 in 2014, and its recording was subsequently released in the live album Super Show 6 – Super Junior World Tour Concert Album in 2015.

== Track listing ==
- Digital download
1. "Nothin' on You" (Album Version) – 4:29
- Digital download – EP
1. "Nothin' on You" (Album Version) – 4:29
2. "Nothin' on You" (TC Switch-Up Remix) – 3:57
3. "Nothin' on You" (TC Switch-Up Extended Remix) – 5:25
4. "Nothin' on You" (Instrumental Version) – 4:23
5. "Nothin' on You" (Acapella version) – 4:21
- Promo CD
1. "Nothin' on You" (Short Radio Edit) – 3:42
- CD single
1. "Nothin' on You" (Album Version) – 4:29
2. "Haterz Everywhere" (Album Version) (featuring Wes F.I.F) – 3:28
- 12" single Nothin' on You & Airplanes
1. "Nothin' on You" (Album Version) – 4:29
2. "Nothin' on You" (Instrumental) – 4:29
3. "Airplanes" (Explicit) – 2:59
4. "Airplanes" (Amended) – 2:59
5. "Airplanes" (Instrumental) – 2:29

== Personnel ==
Credits adapted from the liner notes of B.o.B Presents: The Adventures of Bobby Ray.

- Bobby Simmons Jr. – lead vocals, songwriting
- Bruno Mars – lead vocals, songwriting, instrumentation
- Philip Lawrence – songwriting
- Ari Levine – songwriting, instrumentation, engineering, recording, mixing
- The Smeezingtons – production
- Brody Brown – instrumentation
- Chris Gehringer – mastering

== Charts ==
=== Weekly charts ===
List of chart positions
Chart (2010)	Peak position
Australia (ARIA)	3
Austria (Ö3 Austria Top 40)	28
Belgium (Ultratop 50 Flanders)	44
Belgium (Ultratop 50 Wallonia)	40
Canada Hot 100 (Billboard)	10
Canada AC (Billboard)	48
Canada CHR/Top 40 (Billboard)	2
Canada Hot AC (Billboard)	11
Denmark (Tracklisten)	24
European Hot 100 Singles (Billboard)	5
France Download (SNEP)	37
Germany (GfK)	22
Hungary (Editors' Choice Top 40)	31
Ireland (IRMA)	7
Israel (Media Forest)	7
Italy (Musica e dischi)	12
Mexico (Billboard Mexican Airplay)	3
Mexico Anglo (Monitor Latino)	8
Netherlands (Dutch Top 40)	1
Netherlands (Single Top 100)	15
New Zealand (Recorded Music NZ)	5
Portugal Digital Songs Sales (Billboard)	8
Scottish Singles Sales (Official Charts)	1
South Korea International Singles (Gaon)	1
Spain (Promusicae)	41
Sweden (Sverigetopplistan)	28
Switzerland (Schweizer Hitparade)	28
UK Singles (Official Charts)	1
UK Hip Hop/R&B (Official Charts)	1
US Billboard Hot 100	1
US Adult Pop Airplay (Billboard)	23
US Dance Airplay (Billboard)	22
US Hot Rap Songs (Billboard)	1
US Hot R&B/Hip-Hop Songs (Billboard)	5
US Latin Pop Airplay (Billboard)	36
US Pop Airplay (Billboard)	1
US Rhythmic Airplay (Billboard)	1
US Tropical Airplay (Billboard)	38

List of chart position
Chart (2024)	Peak position
Singapore (RIAS)	29

List of chart position
Chart (2026)	Peak position
Philippines Hot 100 (Billboard Philippines)	52

List of chart position for B.o.B and Jay Park version
Chart (2012)	Peak position
South Korea International Singles (Gaon)	1

=== Year-end charts ===
List of chart positions
Chart (2010)	Position
Australia (ARIA)	49
Brazil (Crowley)	51
Canada (Canadian Hot 100)	46
Italy (FIMI)	85
Japan Adult Contemporary (Billboard)	29
Netherlands (Dutch Top 40)	13
Netherlands (Single Top 100)	63
South Korea International Singles (Gaon)	1
UK Singles (UK Singles Chart)	38
US Billboard Hot 100	11
US Hot R&B/Hip-Hop Songs (Billboard)	30
US Hot Rap Songs (Billboard)	1
US Mainstream Top 40 (Billboard)	18
US Rhythmic (Billboard)	1

== Certifications ==
List of certifications
Region	Certification	Certified units/sales
Australia (ARIA)	Platinum	70,000^{^}
Canada (Music Canada)	Platinum	80,000^{*}
Denmark (IFPI Danmark)	Gold	45,000^{‡}
Italy (FIMI)	Gold	15,000^{*}
New Zealand (RMNZ)	3× Platinum	90,000^{‡}
New Zealand (RMNZ) May 25th mixtape version	Gold	15,000^{‡}
Spain (Promusicae)	Gold	50,000^{‡}
United Kingdom (BPI)	Platinum	600,000^{‡}
United States (RIAA)	6× Platinum	6,000,000^{‡}
^{*} Sales figures based on certification alone.^{^} Shipments figures based on certification alone.^{‡} Sales+streaming figures based on certification alone.

== Release history ==
List of release history, showing region(s), date(s), format(s) and label(s)
Region	Date	Format	Label	Ref.
United States	December 15, 2009	Digital download	Atlantic	
United States	February 2, 2010	Rhythmic contemporary	Atlantic; Grand Hustle	
Italy	March 26, 2010	Radio airplay	Warner Music Group	
Brazil	May 14, 2010	EP	Warner Music Group	
Ireland	May 14, 2010	EP	Warner Music Group	
United Kingdom	May 14, 2010	EP	Warner Music Group	
United Kingdom	May 17, 2010	Digital download	Atlantic	
United Kingdom	May 17, 2010	CD single	Atlantic	
Germany	May 21, 2010	CD single	Atlantic	
South Korea	June 15, 2010	—N/a	Warner Music Group Asia Pacific	
United States	2010	12" single	Atlantic	

== See also ==
- List of Dutch Top 40 number-one singles of 2010
- List of number-one singles from the 2010s (UK)
- List of UK R&B Singles Chart number ones of 2011
- List of Billboard Hot 100 number-one singles of 2010
- List of Billboard Hot Rap Songs number-one songs of the 2010s
- List of Billboard Rhythmic number-one songs of the 2010s
- List of Mainstream Top 40 number-one hits of 2010 (U.S.)
