= Underground Atlanta (album) =

Compilation album by various artists
- Released: August 31, 2009
- Recorded: 2007–2009
- Genre: Hip hop
- Length: 91:16
- Labels: Grind Time Official, SMC
- Producers: Brandon Bdon Matthews, Cedric Brown, Nard & B, Grade A Muzik, Mark for Stant Out Ent., G Fresh, Wonder, B.o.B, Marcus Frazier, Rick the Maestro, Zaytoven, Zeek Da Freak, Urban Rockstarz, Trackman, The Beatbullies

Singles from Underground Atlanta
- 1. "I'mma Fool wit It" Released: June 10, 2009

Professional ratings
Review scores
| Source | Rating |
|---|---|
| HipHopDX | 3/5 stars |
| Planetill | 2.5/5 stars |

Underground Atlanta is a hip hop compilation album performed by various artists. The double disc album was released on August 31, 2009, by American rapper Killer Mike’s Grind Time Official and SMC Recordings. The compilation was supported by the release of one single, "I'mma Fool wit It", by Killer Mike featuring Big Kuntry King.

== Track listing ==
Disc 1
| No. | Title | Producer(s) | Length |
|---|---|---|---|
| 1. | "Intro" | B-Don, Cedric Brown | 4:26 |
| 2. | "Oh Yeah Young" (featuring Yung Ralph) | B-Don, Cedric Brown | 5:40 |
| 3. | "I'mma Fool wit It" (featuring Big Kuntry King) | Nard & B | 3:45 |
| 4. | "Bunkin'" (featuring Pill) | Grade A Muzik | 3:42 |
| 5. | "In the Kitchen" (featuring OJ da Juiceman) | B-Don, Cedric Brown | 4:06 |
| 6. | "Ham" (featuring Scrilla and SL Jones) | B-Don, Cedric Brown | 4:10 |
| 7. | "Bowling" (featuring the Rich Kidz) | Mark | 4:05 |
| 8. | "Hold Up" (featuring SL Jones) | B-Don, Cedric Brown | 3:41 |
| 9. | "Stuntin' Like a..." (featuring Princess) | B-Don, Cedric Brown | 3:10 |
| 10. | "Put On" (featuring Dem Get-A-Way Boyz) | B-Don, Cedric Brown | 5:03 |
| 11. | "Choosey Lady" (featuring SL Jones) | B-Don, Cedric Brown | 4:58 |
| 12. | "Don't Do It Like Dat" (featuring Scar) | B-Don, Cedric Brown | 4:08 |
| 13. | "Charge It" (featuring Champ Squad) | B-Don, Cedric Brown | 4:24 |
| 14. | "Freaky Girls" (featuring Travis Porter) | G Fresh | 3:13 |
| 15. | "I Be Off Dat" (featuring Trillvile) | B-Don, Cedric Brown | 3:57 |
| 16. | "2 Sides" (featuring Shawty Lo) | Wonder | 3:29 |

Disc 2
| No. | Title | Producer(s) | Length |
|---|---|---|---|
| 1. | "Grind Time" (featuring da Bill Collector, Pill and SL Jones) | B-Don, Cedric Brown | 3:29 |
| 2. | "My Money" (featuring Soulja Boy Tell 'Em and J. Bar) | B-Don, Cedric Brown | 3:19 |
| 3. | "Eastside" (featuring da Backwudz) | B-Don, Cedric Brown | 4:41 |
| 4. | "Generation Lost" (featuring B.o.B) | B.o.B | 2:57 |
| 5. | "Fuck Dat Hipster Bitch" (featuring Grip Plyaz) | B-Don, Cedric Brown | 4:57 |
| 6. | "Rather Be With You" (featuring Dodigatie and Slimm Calhoun) | Marcus Frazier, Rick the Maestro | 3:37 |
| 7. | "So Fly" | B-Don, Cedric Brown | 5:02 |
| 8. | "What's Next?" (featuring B.B.M.) | | 4:13 |
| 9. | "Don't Go Outside" (featuring Prynce CyHi) | Zeek da Freak | 4:14 |
| 10. | "Get Ya Cash Up" (featuring Dre, Jay City and Slimm Calhoun) | B-Don, Cedric Brown | 4:52 |
| 11. | "Trunk" (featuring K. Digga and Gucci Mane) | B-Don, Cedric Brown | 4:45 |
| 12. | "Wait For You" (featuring Tamara J) | Urban Rockstarz | 3:47 |
| 13. | "Haters to the Side" (featuring Fonzworth Bentley and Slimm Calhoun) | B-Don, Cedric Brown | 3:22 |
| 14. | "Comin' True" (featuring Khujo) | B-Don, Cedric Brown | 4:21 |
| 15. | "I Want War" (featuring Pastor Troy) | Trackman | 3:11 |
| 16. | "Niggaz Down South" (featuring T.I. and Bun B) | The Beatbullies | 4:48 |
| Total length: | | | 1:31:16 |

== Charts ==
| Chart (2009) | Peak position |
|---|---|
| U.S. Billboard Top R&B/Hip-Hop Albums | 34 |
| U.S. Billboard Top Rap Albums | 10 |
