= Airplanes (song) =

2010 single by B.o.B featuring Hayley Williams

Single by B.o.B featuring Hayley Williams

from the album B.o.B Presents: The Adventures of Bobby Ray
- Released: April 13, 2010
- Recorded: 2009
- Genre: Emo rap; rap rock
- Length: 3:01
- Label: Grand Hustle; Rebel Rock; Atlantic; A&M/Octone (Oceania)
- Songwriters: Bobby Simmons; Alexander Grant; Justin Franks; Jeremy "Kinetics" Dussolliet; Tim "One Love" Sommers; Christine Dominguez
- Producers: Alex da Kid; DJ Frank E

B.o.B singles chronology
"Don't Let Me Fall" (2010)	"Airplanes" (2010)	"Magic" (2010)

Hayley Williams singles chronology
"Airplanes" (2010)	"Rainbow Connection" (2011)

Audio sample
- file; help

Music video
- "Airplanes" on YouTube

"Airplanes" is a song by American rapper B.o.B featuring American singer Hayley Williams. The song was released in April 2010, as the third single from his debut studio album, B.o.B Presents: The Adventures of Bobby Ray. B.o.B co-wrote the song alongside Kinetics & One Love, Alex da Kid, DJ Frank E, and Christine Dominguez. DJ Frank E also co-produced the song with Alex da Kid, and Sage Levy. The song was released to iTunes on April 13, 2010.

"Airplanes" peaked at number two on the Billboard Hot 100. Outside of the United States, "Airplanes" topped the charts in New Zealand and the United Kingdom, and peaked within the top ten of the charts in Australia, Canada, and Ireland. "Airplanes, Part II", the sequel to the song, features new verses from B.o.B, and a verse from fellow American rapper Eminem, while Williams's vocals remained identical to the original. This collaboration led to a Grammy nomination for Best Pop Collaboration with Vocals. The song also appears in the 2011 video game Just Dance 3. (Note: Exclusive to copies sold by Target/Zellers.)

== Background and composition ==
"Airplanes" was composed by B.o.B, Jeremy "Kinetics" Dussolliet, Tim "One Love" Sommers, DJ Frank E, Alex "da Kid" Grant, and Christine Dominguez. B.o.B wrote his rap verses, while Kinetics & One Love and Christine Dominguez wrote the chorus sung by Paramore lead singer Hayley Williams, and DJ Frank E & Alex da Kid co-produced the music. The original version had verses written by Lupe Fiasco. Later, the song was given to B.o.B by his label.

Williams' part in the song was explained by herself and B.o.B in different interviews to MTV. Williams said was on tour when she was given the song and she "liked the part too much" and accepted to appear on it. B.o.B said he has "always been a Hayley fan" and he did not expect a collaboration between them too soon. The duo did not get in the studio together to record the song, they were not together to shoot the music video, and had never even met each other in person, according to Williams. The only time that B.o.B and Williams were able to meet was when they performed "Airplanes" live for the first time together during the 2010 MTV Video Music Awards. The second time the song was performed together live was during Vanderbilt University's Fall 2010 "Commodore Quake" concert in Nashville. During B.o.B's performance, Williams came out as a special guest to perform the song.

In 2026, Williams debuted a remixed, live version of "Airplanes" as a part of her concert tour The Hayley Williams Show. In the debut, Williams reprises her own part, while B.o.B.'s verses were replaced with original lyrics performed by rapper and concert opener Rico Nasty.

== Music video ==
A music video was filmed with Williams. B.o.B shot his scenes for the video in April 2010, but Williams was only able to shoot her parts after the end of Paramore's Spring tour, so they were never in the same room during filming. The music video, directed by Hiro Murai, premiered on iTunes on June 15, 2010. The video features several frames of B.o.B rapping his verses in a party setting, on stage, and a room filled with lights and occasional song lyrics while a barefoot Williams sings the hook in a light-filled room and walking through photographs.

The video was nominated for Video of the Year at the 2010 MTV Video Music Awards and the BET Awards of 2011. As of May 2025, the song has 715 million views on YouTube.

== Chart performance ==
"Airplanes" sold 138,000 digital downloads in its first week and debuted at number five on the Billboard Hot Digital Songs chart. The sales made the song debut at number twelve on the Billboard Hot 100, making it B.o.B's highest debut on the chart and Williams' first entry as a solo act. The song continued to rise in the chart and peaked at number two in its sixth week, losing the top position to Usher's "OMG". "Airplanes" entered in numerous Billboard charts, including the Pop Songs and Rap Songs charts, where the song peaked at number two. "Airplanes" had sold over 4 million digital downloads by December 2010, according to Nielsen Soundscan, becoming a bigger success in the United States than B.o.B's debut single, "Nothin' on You".

Elsewhere, "Airplanes" was well received. The song debuted at number 62 on the Canadian Hot 100 and reached its current peak position of number two on its ninth week on the chart. On the Australian chart, the song debuted at number eighteen and peaked at number two within three weeks on the chart, and has been in that position for six non-consecutive weeks. It was in New Zealand where the song got its first number one position. After three weeks of its debut (at number three), the song reached number one and stayed in that position for five consecutive weeks. It later received a 4× Platinum certification in New Zealand.

In Europe, the song has been released in a number of countries, including the United Kingdom, Ireland, the Netherlands, Norway and Sweden. The first appearance of "Airplanes" on a European chart was in Norway and Ireland, and the song peaked within the top ten of the charts in both countries. In the United Kingdom, the song debuted at number 23 on the UK Singles Chart and within five weeks, the song climbed to number three. In the same week, "Airplanes" was number one on the UK R&B Chart. The following week, "Airplanes" climbed to the summit of the chart from downloads alone of 75,892, becoming B.o.B's second chart-topping song in Britain following his debut single "Nothin' on You", which had reached the top of the chart almost two months earlier. The song is the twenty-first most downloaded single in British chart history. "Airplanes" has also peaked at number two in the European Hot 100 chart. "Airplanes" has sold over 1.6 million units in the UK as of February 2023.

The song was No. 6 on Billboard's Year End Chart.

== "Airplanes, Part II" ==
"Airplanes, Part II"

Song by B.o.B featuring Hayley Williams of Paramore and Eminem

from the album B.o.B Presents: The Adventures of Bobby Ray
- Released: April 27, 2010
- Studio: Patchwerk Studios, Atlanta, Georgia
- Length: 5:19
- Label: Grand Hustle; Rebel Rock; Atlantic
- Songwriters: Bobby Simmons Jr.; Jeremy Dussolliet; Alexander Grant; Luis Resto; Marshall Mathers; Tim Sommers
- Producers: Alex da Kid; DJ Frank E; Luis Resto

A sequel to the song, titled "Airplanes, Part II", has two new verses by B.o.B and a guest verse from Eminem and features vocals by Hayley Williams. The song also features a faster beat and chorus by Hayley Williams compared to the original song. The song was produced by Alex da Kid with additional production added by Eminem. Alex da Kid said that the beat for "Airplanes, Part II" was the original beat for the song. In the song, Eminem and B.o.B wonder what would happen if they had not pursued musical careers. B.o.B posted the song on his official Twitter account, claiming he wanted the song to leak from him since the other songs of his album were leaking. When asked how he got to collaborate with Eminem, B.o.B stated:

"Paul Rosenberg played him the Cloud 9 mixtape and it kind of gave him an idea of what my music [sounds like]. Eventually he started playing Eminem more of my stuff and was keeping him updated on my progress and eventually he wanted to get in the studio with me, so that was a gift."

B.o.B, Eminem, and Keyshia Cole (filling in for Hayley Williams) performed the song at the 2010 BET Awards on June 27, 2010, in a medley with Eminem's "Not Afraid". B.o.B performed the song with Eminem on his Home & Home Tour. "Airplanes, Part II" received a Grammy nomination for Best Pop Collaboration With Vocals, although it was not made into a single.

== 2021 resurgence ==
The 2012 fan art by DeviantArt user bluedog444 titled "(MordeTwi) Airplanes", depicting the characters Twilight Sparkle (left) and Mordecai (right).

Eleven years after its release, the song regained attention in July 2021 when it was referenced in a viral TikTok featuring fan art made by user bluedog444 on DeviantArt in August 2012. The art depicts the characters Twilight Sparkle, the main protagonist of My Little Pony: Friendship Is Magic, and Mordecai, the main protagonist of Regular Show, in separate panels, stargazing while crying, with the lyrics to the song's chorus above them in black text. The pairing of the characters was known as "MordeTwi" – a portmanteau of their names – which originated from a fan fiction in June 2011, preceding the art by over a year. The TikTok featuring the song and art has received more than a hundred million views since its post, spawning an influx of memes.

== Charts ==
=== Weekly charts ===
Weekly chart performance upon release
Chart (2010–2011)	Peak position
Australia (ARIA)	2
Austria (Ö3 Austria Top 40)	2
Belgium (Ultratop 50 Flanders)	9
Belgium (Ultratop 50 Wallonia)	12
Canada Hot 100 (Billboard)	2
CIS Airplay (TopHit)	10
Czech Republic Airplay (ČNS IFPI)	1
Denmark (Tracklisten)	5
Europe (European Hot 100 Singles)	2
Finland (Suomen virallinen lista)	7
France (SNEP)	89
Germany (GfK)	8
Hungary (Rádiós Top 40)	2
Ireland (IRMA)	2
Israel International Airplay (Media Forest)	1
Italy (FIMI)	10
Italy Airplay (EarOne)	24
Netherlands (Dutch Top 40)	4
Netherlands (Single Top 100)	12
New Zealand (Recorded Music NZ)	1
Norway (VG-lista)	6
Poland (Polish Airplay New)	4
Romania (Romanian Top 100)	54
Russia Airplay (TopHit)	9
Scottish Singles Sales (Official Charts)	1
Slovakia Airplay (ČNS IFPI)	15
Sweden (Sverigetopplistan)	10
Switzerland (Schweizer Hitparade)	5
Ukraine Airplay (TopHit)	26
UK Singles (Official Charts)	1
UK Hip Hop/R&B (Official Charts)	1
US Billboard Hot 100	2
US Adult Pop Airplay (Billboard)	26
US Hot R&B/Hip-Hop Songs (Billboard)	65
US Hot Rap Songs (Billboard)	2
US Pop Airplay (Billboard)	2
US Rhythmic Airplay (Billboard)	2

2020s weekly chart performance
Chart (2024–26)	Peak position
Finland Airplay (Radiosoittolista)	62
Romania Airplay (TopHit)	85

=== Monthly charts ===
Monthly chart performance upon release
Chart (2010–11)	Peak position
CIS Airplay (TopHit)	11
Russia Airplay (TopHit)	11
Ukraine Airplay (TopHit)	26

2024 Monthly chart performance
Chart (2024)	Peak position
Romania Airplay (TopHit)	91

=== Year-end charts ===
Year-end chart performance
Chart (2010)	Position
Australia (ARIA)	11
Austria (Ö3 Austria Top 40)	35
Belgium (Ultratop Flanders)	51
Belgium (Ultratop Wallonia)	91
Canada (Canadian Hot 100)	8
CIS Airplay (TopHit)	53
Denmark (Tracklisten)	33
Europe (European Hot 100)	37
Germany (Media Control AG)	57
Hungary (Rádiós Top 40)	31
Ireland (IRMA)	13
Italy (FIMI)	47
Italy Airplay (EarOne)	73
Netherlands (Dutch Top 40)	24
Netherlands (Single Top 100)	50
New Zealand (RIANZ)	5
Russia Airplay (TopHit)	48
Sweden (Sverigetopplistan)	22
Switzerland (Media Control AG)	23
UK Singles (Official Charts Company)	7
US Billboard Hot 100	6
US Mainstream Top 40 (Billboard)	2
US Rap Songs (Billboard)	11
US Rhythmic (Billboard)	5

Chart (2011)	Position
CIS Airplay (TopHit)	114
Hungary (Rádiós Top 40)	2
Russia Airplay (TopHit)	132
Sweden (Sverigetopplistan)	95
Ukraine Airplay (TopHit)	80

=== Decade-end charts ===
10s Decade-end chart performance for "Airplanes"
Chart (2010–2019)	Position
US Billboard Hot 100	78

== Certifications ==
Region	Certification	Certified units/sales
Australia (ARIA)	4× Platinum	280,000^{^}
Austria (IFPI Austria)	Gold	15,000^{*}
Canada (Music Canada)	3× Platinum	240,000^{*}
Denmark (IFPI Danmark)	2× Platinum	180,000^{‡}
Germany (BVMI)	2× Platinum	600,000^{‡}
Italy (FIMI)	Platinum	50,000^{‡}
New Zealand (RMNZ)	4× Platinum	120,000^{‡}
New Zealand (RMNZ) Airplanes, Part II	Gold	15,000^{‡}
Spain (Promusicae)	Gold	30,000^{‡}
United Kingdom (BPI)	3× Platinum	1,800,000^{‡}
United States (RIAA)	Diamond	10,000,000^{‡}
^{*} Sales figures based on certification alone.^{^} Shipments figures based on certification alone.^{‡} Sales+streaming figures based on certification alone.

== The Ready Set version ==
"Airplanes"

Song by the Ready Set

from the album Punk Goes Pop Volume 03.
- Released: November 2, 2010
- Length: 2:37
- Label: Fearless
- Songwriters: Jeremy "Kinetics" Dussolliet; Tim "One Love" Sommers; Justin Franks; Alexander Grant; Bobby Simmons; Christine Dominguez
- Producer: Jordan Witzigreuter

American electropop artist the Ready Set covered the song for the compilation album Punk Goes Pop Volume 03., released on November 2, 2010. The song peaked at number 22 on Billboard Rock Digital Song Sales and stayed on the chart for one week. Alternative Press named his version of the song as the 34th best "Top 50 Punk Goes Pop covers of all time".

=== Charts ===
Chart performance for "Airplanes"
Chart (2010)	Peak position
US Rock Digital Song Sales (Billboard)	22

== See also ==
- List of number-one singles in 2010 (New Zealand)
- List of number-one singles from the 2010s (UK)
- List of number-one R&B hits of 2010 (UK)
