= Don't Let Me Fall =

Single by B.o.B

from the album B.o.B Presents: The Adventures of Bobby Ray
- Released: April 5, 2010 (iTunes); November 30, 2010; September 28, 2010
- Recorded: 2010
- Genre: Alternative hip-hop; rap rock
- Length: 4:35
- Label: Grand Hustle; Rebel Rock; Atlantic
- Songwriters: Bobby Simmons; Clarence Montgomery III
- Producer: Bobby Simmons

B.o.B singles chronology
"Don't Go There" (2010)	"Don't Let Me Fall" (2010)	"Airplanes" (2010)

Music video
- "Don't Let Me Fall" on YouTube

"Don't Let Me Fall" is a song by American recording artist B.o.B, released in the US on April 5, 2010 as the second single from his debut studio album, B.o.B Presents: The Adventures of Bobby Ray (2010). The track was released as a digital download on April 5, and was later released as a "Deluxe Single", on November 30, 2010 through Atlantic Records, Grand Hustle Records, and Rebel Rock Entertainment. The song was sent to radio on September 28, 2010.

The track, an alternative hip-hop and rap rock track, was originally recorded in 2010. The song was produced and written by B.o.B himself, who wrote the song alongside Clarence Montgomery III. The song was featured on the fourth season premiere of The Game on BET and was also used during the intro for the 2011 BCS National Championship Game on ESPN.

== Commercial performance ==
Upon its release, the song charted at number 67 on the Billboard Hot 100 in the United States and peaked at number 62 on the Canadian Hot 100. The song was also certified Gold by the Recording Industry Association of America (RIAA).

== Music video ==
The music video, directed by Ethan Lander, who also directed "Nothin' on You", was filmed in downtown Denver at Red Rocks Park and Amphitheatre. The video contains footage from B.o.B's humble beginnings and of supporters, from manager TJ Chapman to Grand Hustle label-boss T.I. The video premiered at midnight November 16, 2010 on MTV.com.

== Track listing ==
- iTunes released "Don't Let Me Fall" as a deluxe single on November 30, 2010.

Digital single

No.	Title	Writer(s)	Producer(s)	Length
1.	"Don't Let Me Fall"	B. Simmons, C. Montgomery III	B.o.B	4:35
2.	"Can I Fly?"	B. Simmons	B.o.B	3:39
3.	"Don't Let Me Fall" (Music Video)			4:35
4.	"Can I Fly?" (Music Video)			3:39

== Personnel ==
- Lead vocals – Bobby Simmons
- Producers – Bobby Simmons and Chris Moten
- Lyrics – Bobby Simmons, Clarence Montgomery III
- Label: Grand Hustle, Rebel Rock, Atlantic

== Charts and certifications ==
=== Charts ===
Chart (2010–11)	Peak position
Canada Hot 100 (Billboard)	62
US Billboard Hot 100	67

=== Certifications ===
Region	Certification	Certified units/sales
United States (RIAA)	Gold	500,000^{‡}
^{‡} Sales+streaming figures based on certification alone.
