= B.o.B =

American rapper (born 1988)

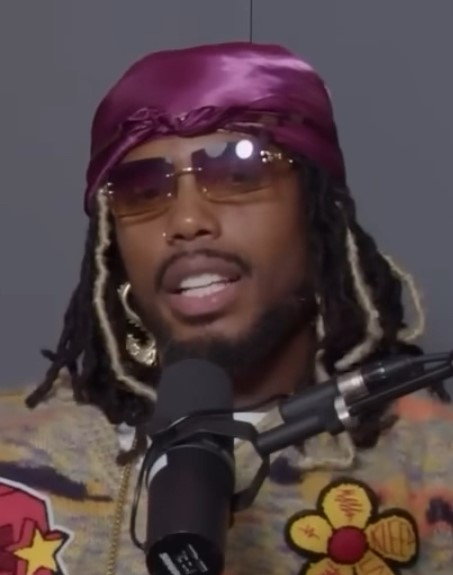
- B.o.B in 2023

Background information
- Born: Bobby Ray Simmons Jr. November 15, 1988 (age 37); Winston-Salem, North Carolina, U.S.
- Origin: Decatur, Georgia, U.S.
- Genres: Southern hip-hop; alternative hip-hop; pop rap
- Occupations: Rapper; singer; songwriter; record producer
- Works: Discography; production
- Years active: 2006–present
- Labels: No Genre; Rebel Rock; Grand Hustle; Atlantic
- Formerly of: All City Chess Club; Hustle Gang
- Website: shopbobbyray.com

Bobby Ray Simmons Jr. (born November 15, 1988), known professionally as B.o.B, (Note: /ˌbiːoʊˈbiː/ BEE-oh-BEE) is an American rapper, singer, songwriter, and record producer.

Raised in Decatur, Georgia, Simmons signed with record producer Jim Jonsin's Rebel Rock Entertainment in 2006. Two years later, he signed a joint venture recording contract with fellow Georgia rapper T.I.'s Grand Hustle Records, an imprint of Atlantic Records. Following his major-label deal, Simmons quickly achieved commercial success when his 2009 single, "Nothin' on You" (featuring Bruno Mars), topped the U.S. Billboard Hot 100 chart and received three nominations—Record of the Year, Best Rap Song, and Best Rap/Sung Collaboration—at the 53rd Grammy Awards.

His 2010 follow-up singles, "Airplanes" (featuring Hayley Williams of Paramore) and "Magic" (featuring Rivers Cuomo), peaked at numbers two and ten on the Billboard Hot 100, respectively. All three preceded the release of Simmons' debut studio album The Adventures of Bobby Ray (2010), which was promoted by two extended plays (EPs) and several self-released mixtapes. The album peaked atop the Billboard 200, received double platinum certification by the Recording Industry Association of America (RIAA), and saw critical praise for its blending of alternative hip-hop, pop rap, and rock. Simmons was named the ninth "Hottest MC in the Game of 2010" by MTV on their annual list. The following year, he guest appeared on English singer Jessie J's 2011 single "Price Tag", which peaked atop the UK Singles Chart and at number 23 on the Billboard Hot 100.

Simmons' dubstep-influenced 2011 single, "Strange Clouds" (featuring Lil Wayne), became his fourth top-ten hit on the Billboard Hot 100. It served as lead single for his second studio album of the same name (2012), which peaked at number five on the Billboard 200 and spawned the follow-up singles "So Good" and "Both of Us" (featuring Taylor Swift), both of which peaked within the top 20 in the US and received platinum certifications by the RIAA. His third studio album, Underground Luxury (2013), explored darker subject matter and adopted a grittier tone, spawning the club-oriented singles "HeadBand" (featuring 2 Chainz) and "We Still in This Bitch" (featuring T.I. and Juicy J); the album was met with a critical and commercial decline. That same year, he guest appeared on the platinum-certified singles "Paranoid" by Ty Dolla Sign and "Up Down (Do This All Day)" by T-Pain.

Dissatisfied with his lack of promotion from the label, Simmons released his twelfth mixtape, Psycadelik Thoughtz (2015), as his final project for Atlantic. His compilation album Elements (2016)—released by his own label, No Genre—was compiled from four mixtapes which delved into political subject matter and conspiracy theories. His 2016 single, "Flatline", was a diss song aimed at astrophysicist Neil deGrasse Tyson, in which Simmons endorsed modern flat Earth beliefs. His fourth album, Ether (2017), served as his first independent album and narrowly entered the Billboard 200.

== Life and career ==
=== 1988–2006: Early life and career beginnings ===
Bobby Ray Simmons Jr. was born on November 15, 1988, in Winston-Salem, North Carolina. He played the trumpet in his school band from elementary school through high school. Although his parents wanted him to continue his education, B.o.B decided in sixth grade that he wanted to pursue a music career. His father, a pastor, disapproved of his son's choices, until he realized B.o.B was using music as a form of therapy and a creative outlet. B.o.B later reflected on his experience, saying, "They've always supported me. They got my first keyboard to make beats on and they helped me out getting equipment here and there. But it was kind of hard for them to really understand what I was really trying to accomplish." B.o.B attended Columbia High School in Decatur, Georgia, where he played the trumpet in the school band, until he landed a record deal and decided to drop out of school in the ninth grade.

In 2002, after meeting his mentor and co-manager B-Rich at the age of 14, B.o.B sold his first beat to former Slip-n-Slide recording artist Citti, for the song "I'm the Cookie Man". B.o.B felt he had established a substantial career. "I went and blew all of my money on fast stuff like a chain and ballin'. Soon I was broke again, but I learned two important things from it; make sure I save my money and that I was hooked on music." He continued performing at open mics and underground venues to perfect his craft. In 2006, because he was underage, B-Rich helped sneak B.o.B into Club Crucial, a night club owned by Atlanta-based rapper T.I. There, B.o.B performed a song titled "Cloud 9", a self-produced, spoken word-like ode to marijuana. In attendance was producer and industry veteran T.J. Chapman, chief executive officer (CEO) of TJ's DJ's. Chapman agreed to co-manage B.o.B, which only a month later led to B.o.B's signing with Atlantic Records and subsidiary imprint Rebel Rock, run by Florida-based producer Jim Jonsin. His first single for Atlantic, 2007's "Haterz Everywhere", reached the top five of Billboard's Bubbling Under R&B/Hip-Hop singles chart. Along with his solo production career, B.o.B is part of the production/rap group HamSquad, along with Playboy Tre, DJ Swatts, DJ Smooth, Moss B, B-Rich and TJ Chapman.

=== 2007–2008: Rise to fame and mixtapes ===
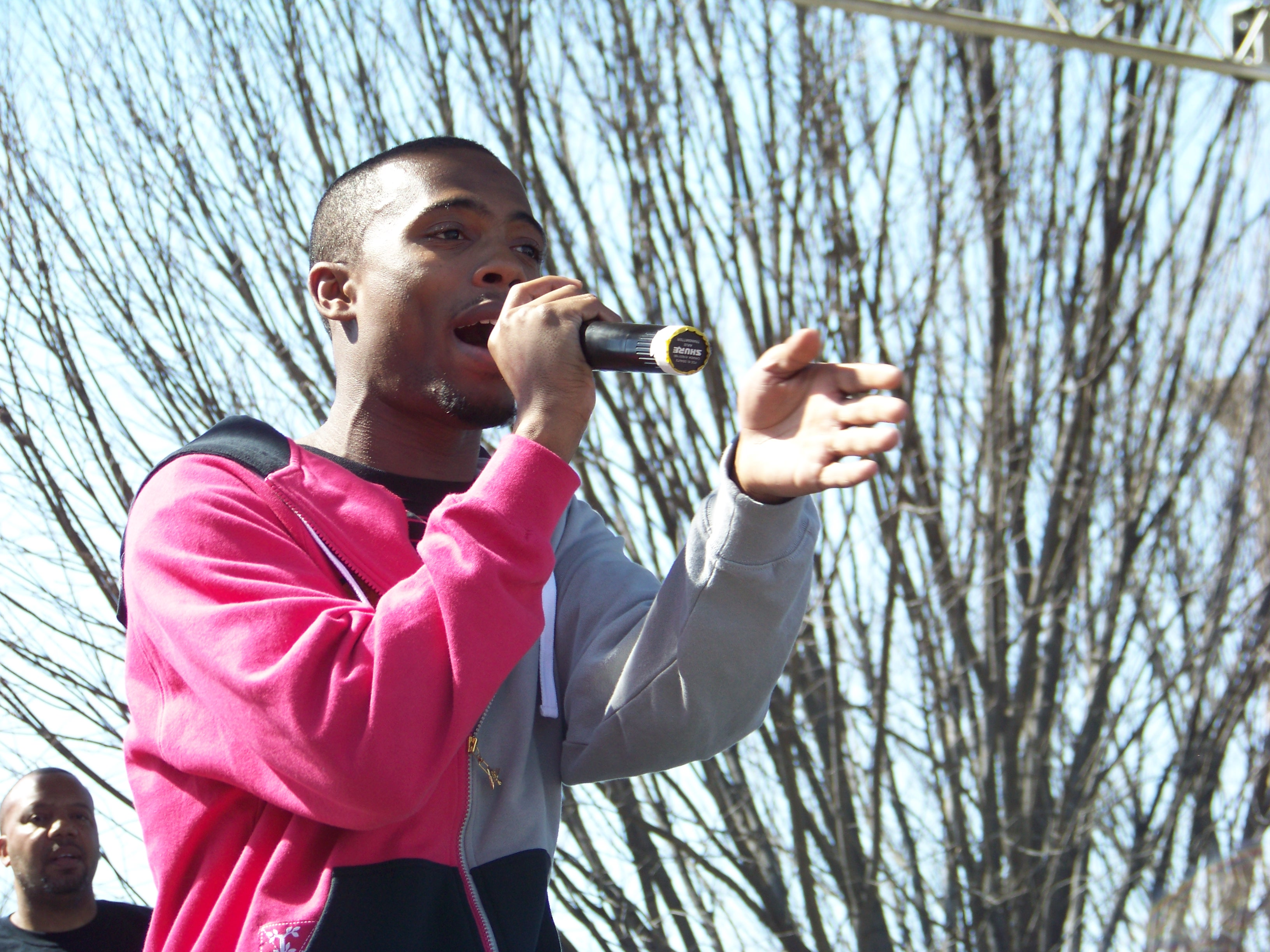
B.o.B performing in Atlanta in 2008

B.o.B first began to gain recognition at the start of 2007. The underground single, "Haterz Everywhere" featuring Wes Fif, gained the rapper attention by peaking at number 5 on the U.S. Billboard Bubbling Under Hot 100 Singles. The remix to "Haterz Everywhere" featuring Rich Boy, was included used in the video game Fight Night Round 4, and a music video was later released for that version. Another single, "I'll Be in the Sky", was released in 2008 and it has reached at number 15 on the same charts. About.com called the song a "smart, funky artrap and a strong prelude to his album" and included it at number 13 on its subjective ranking "Top 100 Rap Songs of 2008". Incidentally, another song produced by B.o.B called "Generation Lost", listed alongside the song, on the ranking at number 32. This was followed by another single, "Don't Let Me Fall". B.o.B made his first big feature appearing on T.I.'s highly acclaimed album Paper Trail (2008), on the song "On Top of the World", alongside fellow Atlanta-based rapper Ludacris.

In 2008, it was announced he would appear on the cover of XXL magazine, along with Asher Roth, Charles Hamilton and Wale as part of their "Hip-Hop's Class of '09" issue. In October 2008, B.o.B was featured on the cover of Vibe along with some of these same young musicians and was similarly identified as promising young talent. From 2007 to 2008, B.o.B released four mixtapes; The Future (2007), Cloud 9 (2007), Hi! My Name is B.o.B (2008) Who the F#*k is B.o.B? (2008) and two extended plays; Eastside (2007), 12th Dimension (2008).

=== 2008–2010: Mainstream success and debut album ===
In 2008, it was announced B.o.B was included in XXL's 2009 annual Freshman Class, and was featured on the cover alongside fellow up-and-coming rappers Asher Roth, Wale, Kid Cudi, Charles Hamilton, Cory Gunz, Blu, Mickey Factz, Ace Hood and Curren$y. In February 2009, B.o.B crafted an original song, titled "Auto-Tune", for the videogame Grand Theft Auto: The Lost and Damned. On May 16, 2009, B.o.B released a cover of Manu Chao's "Mr. Bobby" and said he wanted to be known mononymously as Bobby Ray while also claiming he was taking his music in a "new direction": "Now I go by the name Bobby Ray. Make sure you put Bobby Ray. I'm really going into a new direction – more free and not trying to live up to any particular genre. I don't feel like I've been doing that. I don't feel like I've been trying to fit in, but I feel even more free-spirited. I have more willingness musically. That's all I'm about. I'm about guitars, chords and keyboards".

On June 22, 2009, B.o.B released his fifth mixtape, appropriately titled B.o.B vs. Bobby Ray. The mixtape, reminiscent of T.I.'s T.I. vs. T.I.P. (2007), was mainly produced by Fury and B.o.B. The mixtape also included a song produced by Red Spyda, titled "Fly Like Me" and another titled "Put Me On", which is a re-imagining of A Tribe Called Quest's 1990 hit, "Bonita Applebum". Reebok used "Put Me On" in celebration of the Reebok Classic Remix collection. The track is available for download exclusively to customers who purchase styles from the Reebok Classic Remix collection, at Foot Locker stores nationwide. During the summer of 2009, B.o.B joined fellow up-and-coming rappers Kid Cudi and Asher Roth for 'The Great Hangover' concert tour. B.o.B was to open Blue October's Pick Up the Phone tour in October–November 2009, but the tour was cancelled after Justin Furstenfeld was hospitalized following a severe mental anxiety attack.

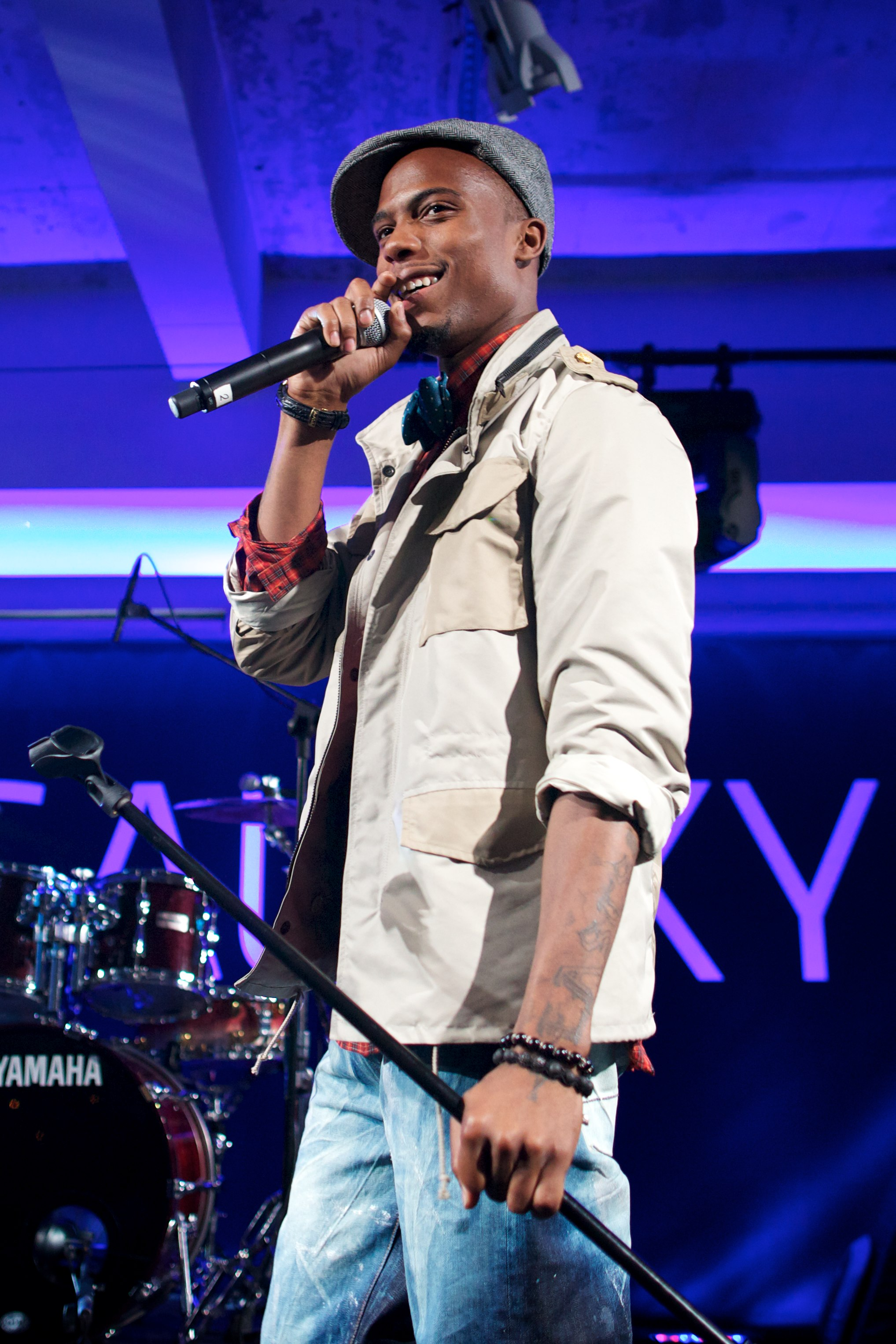
B.o.B performing in July 2010

On January 13, 2010, B.o.B announced his debut studio album, tentatively titled The Adventures of Bobby Ray, was expected to be released on May 25, 2010. To promote the album, B.o.B announced a mixtape titled May 25, in reference to his album's release date. May 25 was released on February 1, 2010, to critical acclaim. The mixtape features guest appearances from J. Cole, Asher Roth, Playboy Tre, Charles Hamilton and Bruno Mars. The latter of whom was featured on the bonus track and B.o.B's debut single, "Nothin' on You". Due to the commercial success of his mixtape May 25 and his single "Nothin' on You", the release date of his debut album was advanced to April 27, 2010. Three other singles followed: "Don't Let Me Fall" (released April 6, 2010), "Airplanes" (April 13, 2010; featuring Hayley Williams), and "Bet I" (April 20, 2010; featuring T.I. and Playboy Tre). A video for "Bet I" was released on Atlantic Videos on YouTube.

B.o.B Presents: The Adventures of Bobby Ray was released under Atlantic and T.I.'s Grand Hustle imprint, featuring guest appearances from Lupe Fiasco, T.I., Playboy Tre, Hayley Williams, Rivers Cuomo, Ricco Barrino, Janelle Monáe and Bruno Mars. The album, released April 27, 2010, was given generally positive reviews. His album sold 84,000 copies in the first week and debuted at number one on the Billboard 200. It made B.o.B the thirteenth solo male artist to have a debut album arrive at number one in its first week. In July, B.o.B announced he will go on tour, naming it The SHOOTiN for Stars Tour. The dates and times were released on his website on July 13. B.o.B has received nominations for his album, singles, and himself by the BET Awards, Teen Choice Awards, MTV Video Music Awards, and the new Suckerfree Summit. "Airplanes" was featured in the trailer for the upcoming movie Charlie St. Cloud and his single "Magic" featured him in an advertisement for Adidas' "Magic" campaign. B.o.B was announced to be a performer at the 2010 MTV Video Music Awards on August 18. He was added to the lineup of Eminem, Linkin Park, Kanye West, Drake, Usher, Paramore, Florence and the Machine, and Justin Bieber.

On August 14, 2010, Hayley Williams announced via the Official Paramore Fan Club that B.o.B would be the main support for Paramore's November UK Tour. B.o.B also opened for Eminem and Jay-Z's The Home & Home Tour at Comerica Park. B.o.B also did a MTV Unplugged session. He performed songs off his debut album, as well as a cover of "Kids" by MGMT, with guests Robin Thicke, Melanie Fiona, and Janelle Monáe. B.o.B also made an appearance in Lollapalooza 2010. B.o.B made an appearance at the 2010 MTV VMA's on September 12, 2010. He performed parts of both his singles, "Nothin' on You" with Bruno Mars and "Airplanes" with Hayley Williams. B.o.B released his seventh mixtape, titled No Genre, on December 7, 2010. B.o.B Presents: The Adventures of Bobby Ray was certified 2× platinum by the RIAA on August 2, 2016.

=== 2011–2012: Strange Clouds ===
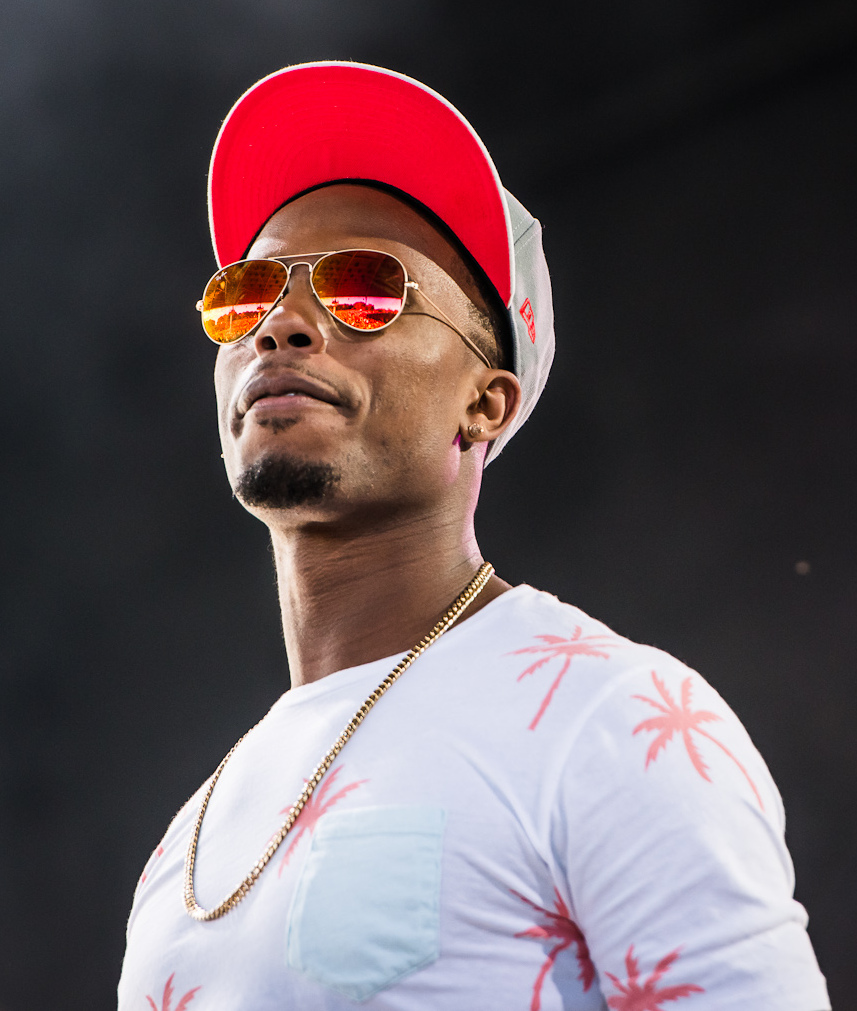
B.o.B performing in 2013

Jessie J released a single featuring B.o.B, titled "Price Tag", on January 30, 2011. The song was quick to reach number one in the United Kingdom charts selling 84,000 copies in its first week of sales. On March 22, 2011, Electronic Arts released the Launch Trailer for the upcoming first-person-shooter Crysis 2 which featured a song by B.o.B titled "New York New York" containing the main piano chorus from the song "Theme from New York, New York" commonly sung by Frank Sinatra; the artist who sang the chorus is unconfirmed. The full song later appeared on his eighth mixtape E.P.I.C. (Every Play Is Crucial), showing the song was produced by Mike Caren. In early 2011, Odd Future's Tyler, the Creator released a song titled "Yonkers". In the song Tyler raps (What you think of Hayley Williams?) Fuck her, Wolf Haley robbing 'em / I'll crash that fucking airplane that that faggot nigga B.o.B is in / And stab Bruno Mars in his goddamn esophagus / And won't stop until the cops come in. In response, on March 25, B.o.B released "No Future" a song in which he takes aim at the hip-hop collective and their leader. In June 2011, it was announced that B.o.B was featured and produced a song on Tech N9ne's twelfth studio album, All 6's and 7's. The track, titled "Am I a Psycho?" features rapper Hopsin as well, who also seems to have issues with Tyler, the Creator. B.o.B also appeared on the official remix to Kesha's hit single "Blow". The remix was released to iTunes on May 17, 2011.

In the summer of 2011, B.o.B was announced the new face of T.I.'s clothing line AKOO. He will be featured in AKOO Clothing's upcoming fall 2011 national advertising campaign alongside Curtis Granderson of the New York Yankees, Carl Crawford of the Boston Red Sox, and star of the BET hit sitcom, The Game, Hosea Chanchez. He will be appearing in a graphic novel for A.K.O.O titled Hide in Plain Sight – Saving the World From Fashion Conspiracy. On August 27, 2011, a video appeared on YouTube of B.o.B performing at Colorado State University, where he previewed a song titled "Strange Clouds" and announced it features Lil Wayne. In an interview with Syracuse University's The Daily Orange, B.o.B spoke of his second studio album for the first time. He went on to say "It's a more mature sound but nothing too experimental. It's a happy medium between the sound of B.o.B Presents: The Adventures of Bobby Ray and the mixtapes, so everyone should be able to enjoy it. I'd say I'm 90 percent done with it right now, but the album title is still TBA." On September 23, 2011, B.o.B released a trailer, through his website, for the upcoming single "Strange Clouds". The trailer announced the single will be officially released October 3. The single leaked prior to the release date on September 25, causing the single to be released on iTunes on September 27. Later that day B.o.B appeared on an online video stream on radio station V103 and announced the title of the album to also be Strange Clouds and was set to be released in early 2012.

Bobby Ray held the first listening session for his album Strange Clouds at Tree Sound Studios on October 25, 2011. Seven new songs were previewed during the listening session, including the promotional single "Play the Guitar" which features André 3000. Other big guest appearances confirmed, as the album was not fully complete, include Lil Wayne, Big K.R.I.T., Nelly and a song with T.I. titled "Arena". In addition he has worked with OneRepublic on a song and has been quoted as having: "the song of 2012 with a mega feature from somebody who never does features with anyone!". On November 15, 2011, B.o.B said he would be releasing a mixtape titled E.P.I.C. (Every Play Is Crucial) prior to the album's release. The mixtape was released on November 28, 2011, featuring guest appearances from Eminem, Mos Def, Roscoe Dash, Meek Mill, and Bun B amongst others and included production from Ryan Tedder to Lil C and Jim Jonsin.

While on set for the "Strange Clouds" music video, MTV interviewed B.o.B and confronted him of a rumor that he and T.I. are working on a collaborative album, B.o.B responded: "The joint album, it actually started as a joke. Tip would always refer to me as 'the Martian', and in one of his lyrics, he said, 'It's the man and the Martian,' and we said, 'Man that could be an album title.' We kinda just played around with it. But it seems to be taking form in a very organic way." On December 1, 2011, B.o.B appeared on New York City's Hot 97 radio station and confirmed that he and T.I. are indeed working on a collaborative album titled The Man & The Martian.

On December 22, 2011, B.o.B released a snippet of "Play the Guitar", a promotional single, featuring André 3000 and a sample of "Fancy" as performed by Drake, T.I. and Swizz Beatz. "Play the Guitar" was later released to digital retailers on December 27, 2011. On February 14, 2012, B.o.B released a trailer for the second official single, "So Good". The song, produced by Ryan Tedder, was released on February 21. In 2012 in an interview with PopCush, B.o.B expressed his desire to work with Kid Cudi, James Blake and Skrillex: "I would also like to work with James Blake. That'd be crazy. I think me, James Blake and Kid Cudi should do a song and it should be produced by Skrillex. I think the sky would fall if we did that song and the sky would come down to Earth and party with us." On March 20, 2012, B.o.B released "Where Are You (B.o.B vs. Bobby Ray)", the second promotional single from Strange Clouds. "So Hard to Breathe" was released as the third promotional single on April 17, 2012.

In an April 2012 interview with HipHopDX, B.o.B announced he would be releasing a rock album. B.o.B appeared on Haley Reinhart's debut studio album Listen Up! on the intro track "Oh My". Strange Clouds, B.o.B's second studio album, was released May 1, 2012, to critical acclaim. The album debuted at number five on the U.S. Billboard 200, with 76,000 copies sold the first week. "Both of Us" serves as the album's third single and was sent to Top 40 Mainstream radio on May 22, 2012. The song features American singer-songwriter Taylor Swift. It debuted on Australia Top 50 singles chart at number 46. The song sold 143,000 copies first week, along with the album release, debuting at number 18 on the Billboard Hot 100 and became the week's top debut.

=== 2012–2014: Underground Luxury and No Genre ===
On October 9, 2012, B.o.B was featured on the annual BET Hip Hop Awards cypher, alongside his Grand Hustle label-mates Iggy Azalea, T.I., Chip and Trae tha Truth. On November 15, 2012, B.o.B released his ninth mixtape, entitled Fuck 'Em We Ball. The mixtape features guest appearances from T.I., Juicy J, Mac Miller, Playboy Tre, Snoop Lion, Spodee and Iggy Azalea, with much of the production coming from B.o.B himself. The mixtape also spawned a single, with the release of the club banger, "We Still in This Bitch". In early December, B.o.B revealed to MTV plans to release a rock music-influenced extended play: "I've been holding back so much rock for so long. I have been performing with my band for a while, so I guess this is a real good canvas for me to paint on. No one's really expecting anything so I can do what I want to do." He also spoke lightly on his third studio album as well: "My album is basically a continuation of The Adventures of Bobby Ray and Strange Clouds. I feel like it kinda bridges the gap between where all my fans are and finally getting everybody up to speed on what my sound is and exactly where I'm going."

While filming the video for "Memories Back Then", in an interview with Rap-Up, B.o.B spoke on a series of projects including his third album, a rock EP, and the Hustle Gang compilation. Rap-Up TV caught up with Bobby Ray, where he stated his rock EP is in the works and will reflect his diverse influences: "When I drop it, everyone's gonna have an eargasm. It's really how I fell in love with rock music, from indie to alternative to classic rock to even some forms of country music." He spoke of his third album, which is nearing completion: "This project is a lot more effortless than anything because I've really shown the full spectrum of what I can do musically, so now I'm just having fun with it. I'm 24 years old, so I'm partying." In March, B.o.B teamed up with fellow Atlanta rapper Big Boi of OutKast to release the official theme song for the 2013 video game Army of Two: The Devil's Cartel; if pre-ordered the rappers were also playable characters. The song, titled "Double or Nothing", was accompanied with a music video directed and produced by Vice, Noisey and EA.

On April 22, 2013, it was announced B.o.B would tour with fellow American rappers Wiz Khalifa, A$AP Rocky, Trinidad James, Joey Bada$$, and Smoke DZA, for the Under the Influence concert tour. The tour would then begin on July 17, 2013. On May 12, 2013, B.o.B tweeted: "Underground Luxury ... coming this summer... #staytuned", revealing the title of his third studio album. In May, B.o.B also premiered a music video for a newly released song of his titled "Through My Head". The video was directed by Peruvian film director Ricardo de Montreuil. On May 13, 2013, radio personality Funkmaster Flex premiered "HeadBand" (featuring 2 Chainz), the lead single from Underground Luxury. The song would be released to retail on May 21, 2013. The song has since peaked at number 65 on the Billboard Hot 100. B.o.B later revealed in an early September interview, that the album would be released in December 2013.

On September 10, 2013, the second single from Underground Luxury, titled "Ready", was released to iTunes. The song, produced by Noel "Detail" Fisher", features fellow Atlanta-based rapper Future. In September 2013, B.o.B revealed he has plan to launch his own record label imprint. During an interview, he stated "I'm putting my CEO pants on, man. I'm finna start a label called HamSquad and I'm looking for artists to be the flagship artists for the label. So I'm really excited about that." In the same interview he announced Underground Luxury, would be released in December. B.o.B called his third album a "Career Shifting Project", adding that the album will revolve around how his life has changed since achieving "major success". On October 15, 2013, the music video for "Ready" was released. On October 17, 2013, during an interview on BET's 106 & Park, B.o.B announced that the album would be released on December 17, 2013.

Underground Luxury debuted at number 22 on the Billboard 200, with first-week sales of 35,000 copies in the United States. This was a steep decline in sales from his first two albums which respectively sold 84,000 and 74,000 in their first week. In its second week the album dropped to number 30, selling 19,000 more copies in the United States. In its third week the album sold 9,000 more copies. In its fourth week the album sold 6,600 more copies in the United States.

On June 9, 2014, in an interview with Bootleg Kev, B.o.B announced his new record label imprint, No Genre, named after his 2010 mixtape. On July 9, 2014, B.o.B released No Genre 2, the sequel to his seventh mixtape. No Genre 2 features guest appearances from Kevin Gates, Victoria Monet, Mike Fresh, Ty Dolla Sign, Sevyn Streeter, Mila J, T.I. and more. On October 14, 2014, B.o.B released a song titled "Not For Long", featuring Trey Songz, as a single via digital distribution. On October 7, 2014, an up-and-coming singer named Tora Woloshin, announced she signed to No Genre. On October 24, 2014, B.o.B released a song titled "Fleek", the song was credited to B.o.B's new label imprint, No Genre. The song features No Genre's newly signed artists, Lin-Z and London Jae. On November 28, 2014, B.o.B released New Black, his eleventh solo mixtape. The project is a cohesive concept album, compiled of politically charged songs, including "Generation Lost", as the third track.

=== 2015–2017: Psycadelik Thoughtz and Elements series ===
On February 24, 2015, B.o.B appeared on Tech N9ne's "Hood Go Crazy", alongside 2 Chainz, which received moderate success. Later that year, B.o.B spoke about the possibility of a collaborative mixtape with Tech N9ne. On August 14, 2015, B.o.B released an experimental project titled Psycadelik Thoughtz, stating that it was "one of the most defining projects" for his artistry. It features guest appearances from singers Jon Bellion and Sevyn Streeter. The commercial mixtape, which was released without any promotion or pre-release singles, debuted at number 97 on the U.S. Billboard 200 chart. Having released multiple projects with Atlantic, including three extended plays (EPs), three studio albums and a retail mixtape, the two sides separated soon after B.o.B claimed that the label was "suppressing" him. "There's a ban on BoB," he wrote on Twitter, before diving into his issues with his then-label. "They boycott me, they are afraid I'll get too much exposure," he continued. "My own label doesn't even promote my albums, mixtapes, shows or events... ZERO promo." Since his split with Atlantic, B.o.B ventured off with his label No Genre and partnered with Empire Distribution. On December 4, 2015, B.o.B self-released a mixtape titled WATER.

On January 2, 2016, B.o.B said "I haven't forgotten about the rock album.. when the time is right." On January 18, 2016, B.o.B released his second mixtape in as many months. The mixtape, titled FIRE, follows the concept of his previous one, adopting the title of an element and the use of acronyms. On April 22, 2016, in celebration of Earth Day, B.o.B released a mixtape titled EARTH, which includes the controversial flat earther anthem "Flatline", in which he espouses multiple conspiracy theories. On November 4, 2016, B.o.B released his first compilation album, Elements, composed of songs from his last four solo mixtapes, WATER, FIRE, EARTH and AIR. The mixtapes contained in it focus on his political and philosophical views.

=== 2017–present: Independent albums ===
On May 12, 2017, the rapper released his fourth studio album and first independent album, Ether. The album features guest appearances from artists like Lil Wayne, Young Thug, T.I., Big K.R.I.T., Ty Dolla Sign, Usher, CeeLo Green and Young Dro.

On July 5, 2018, B.o.B released his sixth studio album, Naga. Though he stated at the time that it would be his last, a follow-up mixtape, Southmatic, was released the following year. In 2020 and 2021, he released two further projects, his sixth studio album Somnia and the compilation album Lost Tapes.

He is scheduled to embark on the North American Back To Basics Tour with Gym Class Heroes and Lupe Fiasco in 2026.

== Artistry ==
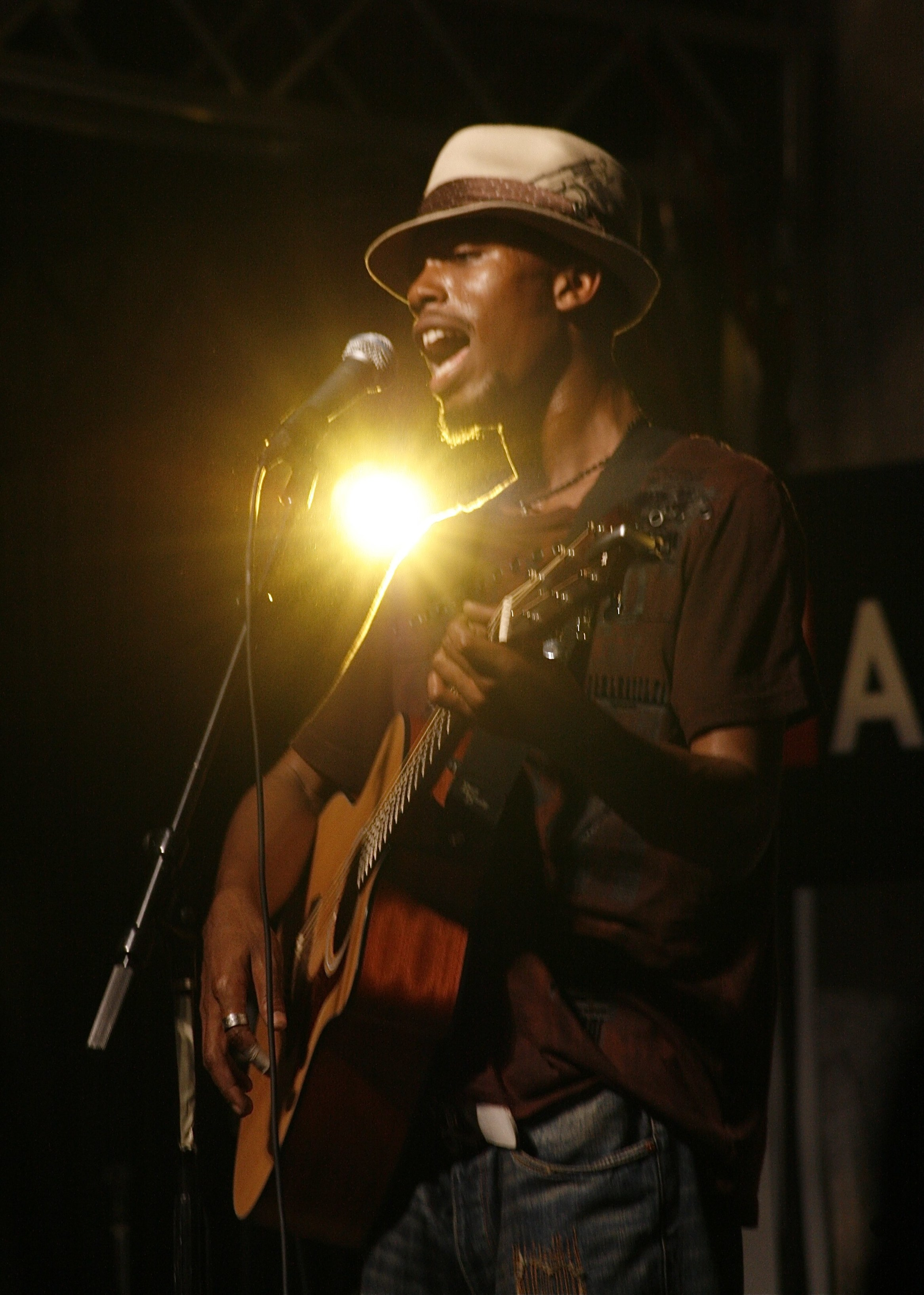
B.o.B plays both the piano and guitar, often applying live instruments into his songs.

=== Influences ===
B.o.B has described his influences as "80's music, techno, rock, funk, even doo-wop". In a 2012 interview with HipHopDX, when asked "given your age and where you grew up, how have the sounds of Goodie Mob, Outkast, T.I. and other Southern hip-hop artists influenced you?", Simmons responded with: "Oh yeah all of them. Outkast, Goodie Mob, Trillville, Lil Jon & the East Side Boyz, Crime Mob, Bone Crusher. All of them played a huge role in creating the sound that I had. When you are in Atlanta you see everything, but I still ventured off into other areas. I was a huge Eminem fan. A DMX fan. [A] Dr. Dre [fan]. I think that's why I have a universal appreciation for such music." Simmons' 2015 album Psycadelik Thoughtz, was influenced by "'70s rock and funk".

=== Musical style ===
In a 2009 interview, when asked about his music B.o.B said: "I try to be more personal than try to be different". In a review for his debut album The Adventures of Bobby Ray (2010), HipHopDX wrote: "The versatility that B.o.B encapsulates is evident from the outset of the album." B.o.B sings, raps, plays the piano and the guitar, all throughout his debut. He utilizes pop music, political hip-hop, trap music, rock music, and club music, often dividing himself into two personas that handle specific genres; the B.o.B alter ego is responsible for the pop, trap and club music, while Bobby Ray is the more heartfelt multi-instrumentalist who shares his views through conscious rap and rock music. Simmons heavily explored this concept on his 2009 mixtape B.o.B vs. Bobby Ray, and later on the 2012 single "Where Are You (B.o.B vs. Bobby Ray)".

== Beliefs ==
B.o.B is an outspoken conspiracy theorist and is noted for his anti-establishment views, which he has expressed in interviews, social media and his music. He has also been vocal on several social and political issues, including the rights of African Americans, police brutality and American exceptionalism. He believes that the Earth is flat, Apollo 11 was faked, 9/11 was an inside job, the world will be taken over by the Illuminati and celebrity cloning is administered by the U.S. government. B.o.B's 2016 song "Flatline" alludes to antisemitic conspiracy theories, asking his audience to "Do [their] research" on Holocaust denier David Irving, adding "Stalin was way worse than Hitler / That's why the POTUS gotta wear a Kipper [kippah]." These comments gained the attention of the Anti-Defamation League, which stated the lyrics invoke the antisemitic conspiracy theory that alleges Jews control the U.S. government.

=== Flat Earth ===
In January 2016, B.o.B expressed the belief that the Earth is flat. Astrophysicist Neil deGrasse Tyson responded to B.o.B on Twitter and attempted to persuade him that the Earth is round, but the rapper refused to retract his views and accused NASA of avoiding questions, while releasing a diss track against Tyson. The track, titled "Flatline", expands on B.o.B's views about the shape of the Earth. Tyson and his rapper nephew, Stephen, responded to B.o.B's flat Earth diss with their own diss track titled "Flat to Fact". Tyson followed this with a January 2016 television appearance on the Comedy Central late-night talk show The Nightly Show with Larry Wilmore where he addressed the rapper: "It's a fundamental fact of calculus and non-Euclidean geometry: Small sections of large curved surfaces will always look flat to little creatures that crawl upon it ... And by the way, this is called gravity" Tyson said, dropping his mic. B.o.B accepted membership in The Flat Earth Society in 2016.

In September 2017, B.o.B sought $200,000 in donations to launch his own satellites to verify the shape of the Earth. Shortly after seeking the original $200,000, B.o.B increased his request to $1,000,000 to cover the cost of many tests, seeking drones, weather balloons, and satellites.

== Discography ==
Studio albums

- B.o.B Presents: The Adventures of Bobby Ray (2010)
- Strange Clouds (2012)
- Underground Luxury (2013)
- Ether (2017)
- Naga (2018)
- Somnia (2020)
- Better Than Drugs (2022)
- A Town Full of Nowhere (2023)
- Space Time (2024)

Other commercial projects

- Psycadelik Thoughtz (2015)
- Elements (2016)

== Awards and nominations ==
=== BET Awards ===
Year	Nominee / work	Award	Result
2010	Video of the Year	"Nothin' On You" (with Bruno Mars)	Nominated
2010	Best Collaboration	"Nothin' On You" (with Bruno Mars)	Nominated
2010	Best Male Hip-Hop Artist	B.o.B	Nominated
2011	Video of the Year	"Airplanes" (with Hayley Williams)	Nominated
2011	Best Collaboration	"Airplanes" (with Hayley Williams)	Nominated
2011	Best Male Hip-Hop Artist	B.o.B	Nominated

=== BET Hip Hop Awards ===
Year	Nominee / work	Award	Result
2009	B.o.B	Rookie of the Year	Nominated
2010	B.o.B	Made-You-Look Award	Nominated
2010	B.o.B	MVP of the Year	Nominated
2010	"Airplanes" (with Hayley Williams)	Track of the Year	Nominated
2010	"Nothin' On You" (with Bruno Mars)	Perfect Combo Award	Nominated
2010	"Nothin' On You" (with Bruno Mars)	People's Champ Award	Nominated
2010	"Nothin' On You" (with Bruno Mars)	Best Hip-Hop Video	Nominated
2010	The Adventures of Bobby Ray	CD of the Year	Nominated
2011	No Genre	Best Mixtape	Nominated
2013	"We Still in This Bitch"	Best Hip-Hop Video	Nominated
2014	"Paranoid"	Sweet 16: Best Featured Verse	Nominated
2014	"Up Down (Do This All Day)"	Sweet 16: Best Featured Verse	Nominated

=== Grammy Awards ===
Year	Nominee / work	Award	Result
2011	"Nothin' on You" (featuring Bruno Mars)	Record of the Year	Nominated
2011	"Nothin' on You" (featuring Bruno Mars)	Best Rap/Sung Performance	Nominated
2011	"Nothin' on You" (featuring Bruno Mars)	Best Rap Song	Nominated
2011	"Airplanes, Part II" (featuring Hayley Williams & Eminem)	Best Pop Collaboration with Vocals	Nominated
2011	The Adventures of Bobby Ray	Best Rap Album	Nominated
2012	Doo-Wops & Hooligans (as featured artist)	Album of the Year	Nominated

=== Other awards and nominations ===
Year	Award	Category	Work	Result
2010	American Music Award	New Artist of the Year	B.o.B	Nominated
2010	American Music Award	Favorite Rap/Hip-Hop Artist	B.o.B	Nominated
2010	American Music Award	Favorite Rap/Hip-Hop Album	The Adventures of Bobby Ray	Nominated
2010	MTV Video Music Award	Video of the Year	"Airplanes" (with Hayley Williams)	Nominated
2010	MTV Video Music Award	Best Male Video	"Airplanes" (with Hayley Williams)	Nominated
2010	MTV Video Music Award	Best Hip-Hop Video	"Airplanes" (with Hayley Williams)	Nominated
2010	MTV Video Music Award	Best Collaboration	"Airplanes" (with Hayley Williams)	Nominated
2010	MTV Video Music Award	Best Pop Video	"Nothin' On You" (with Bruno Mars)	Nominated
2010	MTV Europe Music Award	Best New Act	B.o.B	Nominated
2010	MTV Europe Music Award	Best Push Act	B.o.B	Nominated
2010	Soul Train Music Awards	Best Song of the Year	"Nothin' On You" (with Bruno Mars)	Won
2010	Soul Train Music Awards	Best New Artist	B.o.B	Nominated
2010	Teen Choice Awards	Choice Music: Rap Album	The Adventures of Bobby Ray	Nominated
2010	Teen Choice Awards	Choice Music: Hook-Up	"Airplanes" (with Hayley Williams)	Won
2010	Teen Choice Awards	Choice Music: Summer Song	"Airplanes" (with Hayley Williams)	Nominated
2010	Teen Choice Awards	Choice Music: Single	"Nothin' On You" (with Bruno Mars)	Nominated
2010	Teen Choice Awards	Choice Music: Breakout Male Artist	B.o.B	Nominated
2010	Teen Choice Awards	Choice Music: Summer Male Artist	B.o.B	Nominated
2011	Billboard Music Award	Top Digital Song	"Airplanes" (with Hayley Williams)	Nominated
2011	Billboard Music Award	Top Rap Song	"Airplanes" (with Hayley Williams)	Nominated
2011	Billboard Music Award	Top Rap Song	"Nothin' On You" (with Bruno Mars)	Nominated
2011	MTV Video Music Awards Japan	Best Male Video	"Airplanes" (with Hayley Williams)	Nominated
2011	MTV Video Music Awards Japan	Best Collaboration	"Airplanes" (with Hayley Williams)	Nominated
2011	MTV Video Music Awards Japan	Best New Artist	"Nothin' On You" (with Bruno Mars)	Nominated
2011	NAACP Image Awards	Outstanding New Artist	B.o.B	Nominated
2011	People's Choice Awards	Favorite Breakthrough Artist	B.o.B	Nominated
2011	People's Choice Awards	Favorite Song	"Airplanes" (with Hayley Williams)	Nominated
2012	MTV Europe Music Award	Best World Stage Performance	B.o.B	Nominated
2012	People's Choice Awards	Favorite Hip Hop Artist	B.o.B	Nominated
2014	MTV Europe Music Award	Best World Stage Performance	B.o.B	Nominated
2015	MTV Europe Music Award	Best World Stage Performance	B.o.B	Nominated
