= B.o.B Presents: The Adventures of Bobby Ray =

Studio album by B.o.B
- Released: April 27, 2010
- Recorded: 2008–2010
- Studios: Patchwerk Studios, Atlanta, Georgia
- Genres: Alternative hip-hop; pop-rap; rap rock; pop rock
- Length: 47:57
- Labels: Grand Hustle; Rebel Rock; Atlantic
- Producers: T.I. (also exec.); B.o.B (also exec.); Jim Jonsin (also exec.); Alex da Kid; DJ Frank E; Dr. Luke; Honorable C.N.O.T.E.; Eminem; The Knux; Kuttah; Lil' C; Luis Resto; The Smeezingtons

B.o.B chronology
B.o.B Presents: The Adventures of Bobby Ray (2010)	Strange Clouds (2012)

Singles from B.o.B Presents: The Adventures of Bobby Ray
- 1. "Nothin' on You" Released: December 15, 2009; 2. "Don't Let Me Fall" Released: April 5, 2010; 3. "Airplanes" Released: April 13, 2010; 4. "Bet I" Released: April 20, 2010; 5. "Magic" Released: July 6, 2010; 6. "I'll Be in the Sky" Released: January 31, 2011 (UK)

B.o.B Presents: The Adventures of Bobby Ray is the debut studio album by American rapper B.o.B, released on April 27, 2010, by Grand Hustle Records, Rebel Rock Entertainment and Atlantic Records. Production for the album took place during 2008 to 2010 and was handled by B.o.B himself, alongside Grand Hustle founder T.I., Rebel Rock founder Jim Jonsin, Alex da Kid, DJ Frank E, Dr. Luke, Honorable C.N.O.T.E., Eminem, The Knux, Kuttah, Lil' C, Luis Resto, and The Smeezingtons. Producers T.I. and Eminem, alongside Smeezingtons member Bruno Mars, Lupe Fiasco, Hayley Williams of Paramore, Playboy Tre, Janelle Monáe, Rivers Cuomo of Weezer, Ricco Barrino, and Jay Park.

Six singles were released for the project. The first, "Nothin' on You" (featuring Bruno Mars), was both B.o.B and Mars' debut single, and topped the Billboard Hot 100. The album's third single, "Airplanes" (featuring Hayley Williams), peaked at number 2 on the same chart, and the fifth single, "Magic" (featuring Rivers Cuomo) also charted within the top 10. Two other singles were released for the project, "Don't Let Me Fall" and "Bet I" (the latter featuring T.I. and Playboy Tre), alongside the UK-exclusive single "I'll Be in the Sky", released as a track on the European edition of the album. The promotional single "Haterz Everywhere" (featuring Wes Fif) features as a bonus track to the Japanese edition of the album.

Upon its release, the album received positive reviews from music critics, who complimented the record for its sound and compared its style to the music of André 3000 and Kanye West. Commercially, the album debuted at the top of the Billboard 200, selling 84,000 copies within its first week. It also topped the Top R&B/Hip-Hop Albums and Top Rap Albums charts and peaked within the top 10 on the Billboard Canadian Albums chart. The album would eventually be certified 2× Platinum by the Recording Industry Association of America (RIAA) for equivalent sales of 2,000,000 units in the United States. It was also certified Platinum by IFPI Danmark (IFPI DEN) and Gold by Music Canada (MC) and the British Phonographic Industry (BPI).

== Release and promotion ==
In 2008, after signing with Atlantic and Grand Hustle, B.o.B subsequently began working on his debut album. For a long period the album's tentative title was simply The Adventures of Bobby Ray. In October 2009, during his appearance at the BET Hip Hop Awards, B.o.B revealed that fellow American rappers Eminem and Lupe Fiasco would be featured on his debut album.

Atlantic Records unveiled the album's original release date to be May 25, 2010. With already five mixtapes under his belt, B.o.B decided to release a mixtape in promotion for the album, appropriately titled May 25th, to bring awareness to the album's release date. The mixtape, released February 1, 2010, was heavily downloaded and features guest appearances from J. Cole, Asher Roth, Playboy Tre, Charles Hamilton and Bruno Mars, the latter of whom is featured on the mixtape's bonus track, titled "Nothin' on You". The track "Nothin' on You", was then serviced as the lead single from The Adventures of Bobby Ray the very next day. In a rare occurrence in hip-hop music, the album's release date was pushed up to April 27, 2010 in response to the success of the mixtape and "Nothin' on You".

The album's track listing was revealed on April 3, 2010. In the US, the album was ultimately released with the bonus tracks "Letters from Vietnam" and "I See Ya", specifically through the ITunes Store and Target, alongside an interview with B.o.B and the "Nothin' on You" music video. In Europe, the single "I'll Be in the Sky" was added as the seventh track to the album, extending the track listing to 13 songs. Meanwhile, on the European version on the iTunes Store, "Grip Ur Body" and "Cyber Heaven" were added as bonus tracks. In South Korea, a remix of "Nothin' on You" featuring Jay Park is featured as a bonus track, and in Japan, "I'll Be in the Sky", alongside "Haterz Everywhere" (featuring Wes Fif) appear as bonus tracks.

=== Singles ===
The album's first single "Nothin' on You" featuring Bruno Mars, was uploaded onto B.o.B.'s MySpace on November 25, 2009, and released as the lead single on February 2, 2010 and achieved double Platinum sales in the United States. The album's second single "Don't Let Me Fall", peaked at number 67 on the US Billboard Hot 100. "Don't Let Me Fall," was sent to radio on September 28, 2010 in the United States. The album's third single "Airplanes", was released on April 13, 2010. "Airplanes" features Hayley Williams of Paramore, and has charted over 9 countries and peaked at number 2 in the United States and at number 1 in the United Kingdom. The song's sequel, titled "Airplanes, Part II", contains a featured verse from American rapper and international superstar Eminem.

The album's song "Bet I", was released as a promotional single on April 20, 2010 and features a verse from T.I.. The album's fourth single "Magic", features Weezer's lead singer Rivers Cuomo. The song has charted over 10 countries and became his third top ten hit on the US Billboard Hot 100. After previously being released as a promotional single on October 21, 2008, "I'll Be in the Sky", was released on January 31, 2011, as the album's fifth single in United Kingdom. "I'll Be in the Sky" was only included on the European edition and the Japanese edition bonus tracks of the album.

== Critical reception ==
Professional ratings
Aggregate scores
Source	Rating
Metacritic	67/100
Review scores
Source	Rating
AllMusic	4/5 stars
Entertainment Weekly	B
The Guardian	2/5 stars
The Independent	4/5 stars
Los Angeles Times	3/4 stars
Pitchfork	4.2/10
Rolling Stone	2.5/5 stars
Slant Magazine	3.5/5 stars
Spin	5/10
XXL	XL

According to the review aggregator Metacritic, B.o.B Presents: The Adventures of Bobby Ray received "generally favorable reviews" based on a weighted average score of 67 out of 100 from 18 critic scores. AllMusic writer David Jeffries gave it four out of five stars and noted "how effortless [B.O.B] makes all this genre-juggling seem, especially on repeat listens as the album evolves from a high-caliber collection of singles to a unified body of work". The Washington Post's Sarah Godfrey commended its varied sound and wrote that B.o.B "thoughtfully creates tracks to suit the strengths of each guest, with the one constant being his ability to adapt to almost any style". The Independent's Andy Gill wrote that "he shares [André 3000]'s fancy for a concept [...] developing a theme about the schizoid confusion between the real Bobby Ray and the fantasy superstar". Mike Diver of BBC Online called him "a musician with creativity on tap and enough of it to burn through a little filler here while ensuring the prime cuts emerge perfectly". XXL's Chris Yuscavage gave the album an XL rating and called it "genre-blending".

In contrast, Kenny Herzog of Spin viewed that the album struggles to "establish a distinctive identity", noting "When 'eclectic' is just another word for 'a mess'". Rolling Stone's Jody Rosen viewed B.o.B's lyricism as a weakness, calling his boasts "witless". Giving it a 6.5/10 rating, Jesal Padania of RapReviews called it "a potentially divisive album" and found its lyrical depth inconsistent. The Guardian's Paul MacInnes perceived "a distinct lack of passion", stating "all the Chris Martinesque piano lines and calibrated guest appearances... can't obscure an absence of soul throughout". Jayson Greene of Pitchfork called it "a dishearteningly generic and hollow product with no soul or demographic or viewpoint", and perceived that the album's production purposely overshadows his rapping, stating "B.o.B is a fantastically gifted rapper, with an astonishing rhythmic command and a tricky, limber way with phrasing. On Bobby Ray he's reduced to a guest rapper on his own songs".

Despite writing that its "middle sags futilely", Slant Magazine's M.T. Richards praised its "vibrant energy" and B.o.B's "burning charisma". Entertainment Weekly's Simon Vozick-Levinson stated "when the combination of styles works, he hits a sweet spot that's sure to advance his crossover career". Los Angeles Times writer Todd Martens wrote favorably of B.o.B's "middle-class tales", stating "at his best, [B.o.B] channels the spirit of a young Kanye West". Nathan Rabin of The A.V. Club complimented his lyrics concerning "relationships, fame, ambition, and identity", stating "B.o.B’s soulful, Southern-fried sensitivity dominates this assured, thoughtful debut". USA Today's Steve Jones praised his "boldly inventive rhymes" and musicianship, stating "He colors outside the hip-hop box both lyrically and sonically, mixing and matching soul, rock, pop, folk, rap and funk with abandon. He shifts moods and varies themes touching on such topics as the cost of fame, staying hopeful and being hopelessly infatuated".

It received a nomination for Best Rap Album at the 53rd Annual Grammy Awards.

== Commercial performance ==
The album debuted at number one on the US Billboard 200 chart, with first-week sales of 84,000 copies. It also entered at number one on Billboard's R&B/Hip-Hop Albums, Digital Albums, and Rap Albums charts. It fell to number 12 in its second week on the Billboard 200, selling 36,000 additional copies. By its second week, it had sold 148,000 copies in the United States. The album sold 23,000 copies at number 13 in its third week on the Billboard 200. It dropped to number 15 with 20,000 copies sold in its fourth week on the chart. It remained at number 13 and sold 20,000 copies in its fifth week on the chart, bringing its total domestic sales to 210,000 copies by June 6, 2010. On December 16, 2010, the album was certified gold for shipments of 500,000 copies in the US. As of April 30, 2012, the album had sold 597,000 copies in the United States.

Internationally, B.o.B Presents: The Adventures of Bobby Ray achieved some chart success. In Canada, the album debuted at number seven on the Top 100 albums chart. It also entered at number 42 on the ARIA Top 50 Albums in Australia, and in New Zealand, it entered at number 23 on the RIANZ Top 40 Albums chart. It peaked at number 21 and spent five weeks on the latter chart. In the United Kingdom, the album debuted at number 22 on the Top 40 Albums and at number four on the R&B Albums Chart.

== Track listing ==
No.	Title	Writer(s)	Producer(s)	Length
1.	"Don't Let Me Fall"	Bobby Ray Simmons, Jr.; Clarence Montgomery III	B.o.B	4:35
2.	"Nothin' on You" (featuring Bruno Mars)	Simmons, Jr.; Peter Hernandez; Philip Lawrence; Ari Levine	The Smeezingtons	4:29
3.	"Past My Shades" (featuring Lupe Fiasco)	Simmons, Jr.; Wasalu Jaco	B.o.B	3:33
4.	"Airplanes" (featuring Hayley Williams)	Simmons, Jr.; Alexander Grant; Jeremy Dussolliet; Justin Franks; Tim Sommers	Alex da Kid; DJ Frank E^{[a]}	3:01
5.	"Bet I" (featuring T.I. and Playboy Tre)	Simmons, Jr.; Clifford Harris, Jr.; Montgomery III; Jesse McMullen, Jr.	Kuttah	4:17
6.	"Ghost in the Machine"	Simmons, Jr.	B.o.B	4:53
7.	"The Kids" (featuring Janelle Monáe)	Simmons, Jr.; Franks; Ezra Koenig; Rostam Batmanglij; Chris Baio; Chris Tomson	DJ Frank E	3:26
8.	"Magic" (featuring Rivers Cuomo)	Simmons, Jr.; Lukasz Gottwald; Rivers Cuomo	Dr. Luke	3:16
9.	"Fame"	Simmons, Jr.; Zekuumba Zekkariyas; George Gershwin; Ira Gershwin; DuBose Heyward; Dorothy Heyward; Christopher Lanier; Montgomery III; Alvin Lindsay; Kentrell Lindsay; Howard Coney; Dwight Watson	The Knux	3:41
10.	"Lovelier Than You"	Simmons, Jr.	B.o.B	4:04
11.	"5th Dimension" (featuring Ricco Barrino)	Simmons, Jr.; Marvin Gaye; Harris, Jr.; James Nyx; Kassim Washington; Cordale Quinn	B.o.B; T.I.; Lil' C	3:23
12.	"Airplanes, Part II" (featuring Eminem and Hayley Williams)	Simmons, Jr.; Dussolliet; Grant; Luis Resto; Marshall Mathers; Sommers	Alex da Kid; DJ Frank E^{[a]}; Luis Resto^{[b]}	5:19
Total length:				47:57

European edition
No.	Title	Writer(s)	Producer(s)	Length
1.	"Don't Let Me Fall"	Bobby Simmons, Jr.; Clarence Montgomery III	B.o.B	4:35
2.	"Nothin' on You" (featuring Bruno Mars)	Simmons, Jr.; Peter Hernandez; Philip Lawrence; Ari Levine	The Smeezingtons	4:29
3.	"Past My Shades" (featuring Lupe Fiasco)	Simmons, Jr.; Wasalu Jaco	B.o.B	3:33
4.	"Airplanes" (featuring Hayley Williams)	Simmons, Jr.; Alexander Grant; Jeremy Dussolliet; Justin Franks; Tim Sommers	Alex da Kid; DJ Frank E^{[a]}	3:01
5.	"Bet I" (featuring Playboy Tre and T.I.)	Simmons, Jr.; Clifford Harris, Jr.; Montgomery III; Jesse McMullen, Jr.	Kuttah	4:17
6.	"Ghost in the Machine"	Simmons, Jr.	B.o.B	4:53
7.	"I'll Be in the Sky"	Simmons, Jr.	B.o.B	4:06
8.	"The Kids" (featuring Janelle Monáe)	Simmons, Jr.; Franks; Ezra Koenig; Rostam Batmanglij; Chris Baio; Chris Tomson	DJ Frank E	3:26
9.	"Magic" (featuring Rivers Cuomo)	Simmons, Jr.; Lukasz Gottwald; Rivers Cuomo	Dr. Luke	3:16
10.	"Fame"	Simmons, Jr.; Zekuumba Zekkariyas; George Gershwin; Ira Gershwin; DuBose Heyward; Dorothy Heyward; Christopher Lanier; Montgomery III; Alvin Lindsay; Kentrell Lindsay; Howard Coney; Dwight Watson	The Knux	3:41
11.	"Lovelier Than You"	Simmons, Jr.	B.o.B	4:4
12.	"5th Dimension" (featuring Ricco Barrino)	Simmons, Jr.; Marvin Gaye; Harris, Jr.; James Nyx; Kassim Washington; Cordale Quinn	B.o.B; T.I.; Lil' C	3:23
13.	"Airplanes, Part II" (featuring Hayley Williams and Eminem)	Simmons, Jr.; Dussolliet; Grant; Luis Resto; Marshall Mathers; Sommers	Alex da Kid; DJ Frank E^{[a]}; Luis Resto^{[b]}	5:19
Total length:				52:3

European iTunes Store deluxe edition bonus tracks
No.	Title	Writer(s)	Producer(s)	Length
14.	"Grip Ur Body"	Simmons, Jr.	B.o.B	3:30
15.	"Cyber Heaven"	Simmons, Jr.	B.o.B	3:15
Total length:				54:42

American iTunes Store deluxe edition bonus tracks / Target edition bonus tracks + DVD
No.	Title	Writer(s)	Producer(s)	Length
13.	"Letters from Vietnam"	Simmons, Jr.	B.o.B	4:13
14.	"I See Ya"	Simmons, Jr.; Carlton Mays	Da Honorable C.N.O.T.E.	3:18
15.	"The Adventures of Bobby Ray: Interview"		B.o.B	30:10
16.	"Nothin' on You" (music video)		The Smeezingtons	3:37
Total length:				1:29:15

South Korean edition bonus track
No.	Title	Writer(s)	Producer(s)	Length
14.	"Nothin' on You" (featuring Jay Park)	Simmons, Jr.; Peter Hernandez; Philip Lawrence; Ari Levine	The Smeezingtons	4:25
Total length:				52:22

Japanese edition bonus tracks
No.	Title	Writer(s)	Producer(s)	Length
13.	"Haterz Everywhere" (featuring Wes Fif)	Simmons, Jr.; Robert Horton; Cameron Murray	B.o.B	3:31
14.	"I'll Be in the Sky"	Simmons, Jr.	B.o.B	4:7
Total length:				55:35

Notes

- ^{^[a]} signifies a co-producer.
- ^{^[b]} signifies an additional producer.

== Personnel ==
Credits for B.o.B Presents: The Adventures of Bobby Ray adapted from AllMusic.

- Aaron Bay-Schuck – A&R
- B-Rich – associate producer
- B.o.B – executive producer
- Ryan Brady – marketing
- LaTrice Burnette – marketing
- Corday "Dezedwell" Cardwell – graphics
- Mike Caren – A&R
- John Coster – marketing
- Brian "Busy" Dackowski – marketing
- Anne Declemente – A&R
- Joe Fitz – mixing
- Chris Gehringer – mastering
- Rob Gold – art producer, art manager
- Jim Jonsin – executive producer
- Alex Danger Kirzhner – design
- Sydney Margetson – publicity
- Isam "MrNuDay" Muhammad – graphics
- Shanieke Peru – stylist
- Doug Peterson – associate producer
- Sam Riback – A&R
- Alex Schwartz – A&R
- Pamela Simon – packaging manager
- T.I. – executive producer
- The Smeezingtons – instrumentation

== Charts and certifications ==
=== Weekly charts ===
Chart (2010)	Peak position
Australian Albums Chart	42
Austrian Albums Chart	53
Canadian Albums Chart	7
Dutch Albums Chart	66
French Albums Chart	141
German Albums Chart	93
German Newcomer Chart	8
Greek Albums Chart	19
New Zealand Albums Chart	21
Irish Albums Chart	34
Swiss Albums Chart	47
UK Albums Chart	17
UK R&B Chart	4
US Billboard 200	1
US Billboard R&B/Hip-Hop Albums	1
US Billboard Rap Albums	1

=== Year-end charts ===
Chart (2010)	Position
UK Albums Chart	132
US Billboard 200	61

=== Certifications ===
Region	Certification	Certified units/sales
Canada (Music Canada)	Gold	40,000^{^}
Denmark (IFPI Danmark)	Platinum	20,000^{‡}
United Kingdom (BPI)	Gold	100,000^{^}
United States (RIAA)	2× Platinum	2,000,000^{‡}
^{^} Shipments figures based on certification alone.^{‡} Sales+streaming figures based on certification alone.
