= Airplane (album) =

Studio album by Arvingarna
- Released: 1998
- Genre: Dansband music

Arvingarna chronology
Nya spår (1997)	Airplane (1998)	Lime (1999)

Airplane is the seventh studio album from Swedish "dansband" Arvingarna, released in 1998. The album was produced by Tony Visconti and was an attempt of promoting the band outside of Sweden.

== Track listing ==
1. That was then, this is Now
2. If these Walls Could Talk
3. Every Heartbeat Says "I Love You"
4. Hold on to Your Heart
5. Eloise
6. Airplane
7. The Last Train Tonight
8. She Said
9. Funny How Love Can Be
10. One More Try
11. Tiny Goddess
12. Why oh Why
13. Together Forever
14. Eloise - party mix
15. If these Walls Could Talk - unplugged
