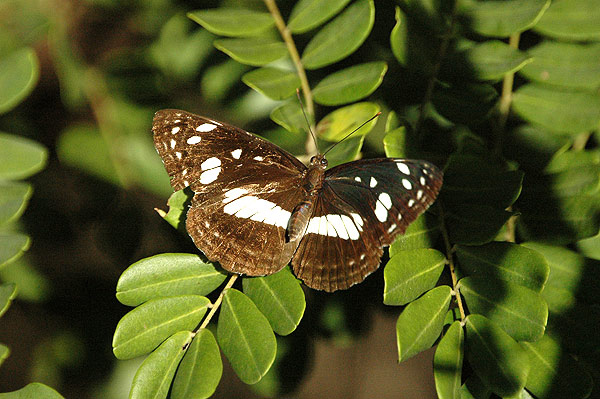

Scientific classification
- Domain: Eukaryota
- Kingdom: Animalia
- Phylum: Arthropoda
- Class: Insecta
- Order: Lepidoptera
- Family: Nymphalidae
- Genus: Phaedyma
- Species: P. shepherdi

Binomial name
- Phaedyma shepherdi Moore, 1858

= Phaedyma shepherdi =

Species of butterfly

Phaedyma shepherdi, the white-banded plane, is a medium-sized butterfly of the family Nymphalidae found in Australia.
