= Bet I =

Single by B.o.B featuring T.I. and Playboy Tre

from the album B.o.B Presents: The Adventures of Bobby Ray
- Released: April 20, 2010
- Recorded: 2010
- Studio: PatchWerk Recording Studios, Atlanta, Georgia
- Genre: Hip hop
- Length: 4:17
- Label: Grand Hustle; Atlantic; Rebel Rock
- Songwriters: Bobby Ray Simmons, Jr.; Clifford Joseph Harris, Jr.; Clarence Montgomery III; Jesse McMullen, Jr.
- Producer: Kutta

Music video
- "Bet I" on YouTube

"Bet I" is a hip-hop song by American rapper B.o.B, taken from his debut studio album B.o.B Presents: The Adventures of Bobby Ray (2010). The song originally appeared on B.o.B's sixth mixtape May 25th (2010), minus a verse from T.I. The version with T.I. was eventually released on April 20, 2010, as the fourth single from his debut album, through Grand Hustle Records, Atlantic Records, and Rebel Rock Entertainment.

The track was recorded in 2010 at PatchWerk Recording Studios, based in Atlanta, Georgia, and features fellow Atlanta-based rappers T.I. and Playboy Tre. The song was written by them, alongside the song's producer, Kutta. Upon its release, the song charted at number 72 on the Billboard Hot 100 and peaked at number 60 on the Hot R&B/Hip-Hop Songs chart. The music video, directed by Gabriel Hart, was released on April 27, 2010.

== Charts ==
Chart (2010)	Peak position
US Billboard Hot 100	72
US Hot R&B/Hip-Hop Songs (Billboard)	60
