= Generation Lost (song) =

Song by B.o.B

from the album Who the F%*k is B.o.B?, Underground Atlanta and New Black
- Released: 2008
- Recorded: 2007
- Genre: Hip hop, conscious hip hop
- Length: 3:33
- Label: Rebel Rock Entertainment
- Songwriter: Bobby Ray Simmons, Jr.
- Producer: B.o.B

Music video
- "Generation Lost" on YouTube

"Generation Lost" is a song by American hip hop recording artist B.o.B, taken from his fourth mixtape, Who the F%*k is B.o.B? (2008). The song, produced by B.o.B himself, was also included on B.o.B's then-Grand Hustle label-mate Killer Mike's compilation album, Underground Atlanta (2009). In November 2014, B.o.B released a politically charged mixtape, titled New Black. The mixtape, which is a cohesive concept album, includes "Generation Lost", as the third track.

== Background ==
In an interview with Complex Magazine, B.o.B acknowledged the irony that he was becoming famous, for doing anti-mainstream music and called it a "blend of both worlds". When asked about the song, B.o.B said: "I wasn't like, 'I need to make this song for radio.' In my world, I'm cool because I know there are fans of music who don't listen to the radio."

== Reception ==
Complex Magazine listed "Generation Lost" as one of the "Key B.o.B Songs You Should Know." About.com included the song at #32 on its subjective ranking "Top 100 Rap Songs of 2008."
