= The Aeroplanes =

English rock band

- Also known as: Aeroplanes
- Origin: Liverpool, England
- Years active: 2003–2010
- Labels: Robot Records; White Noise
- Spinoffs: Cold Shoulder
- Members: Chris Kearney (lead vocals/guitar); Paul Crowe (guitar/vocals); Ian McMillan (drums/vocals); Vicky Edwards (bass)
- Past members: Stuart Palethorpe (bass)
- Website: The Aeroplanes on MySpace

The Aeroplanes are an English rock band from Liverpool. The Aeroplanes formed in 2003 when Chris Kearney (guitar/vocal), Paul Crowe (guitar/vocal) and Stuart Palethorpe (bass) decided to bring their previous outfit ‘Loveland 1881’ to a close to take their sound in a different direction. They were joined by old school friend Ian McMillan (drums) and the line up was complete. In 2007, bassist Stuart left the band and was replaced by Vicky Edwards. The band released their much anticipated debut album ‘Broken Hearts and Maladies’ in November 2008 to positive reviews.

== History ==
Most of 2003 was spent raising their profile around the Liverpool scene and by 2004 they were regularly headlining shows around the city as well as playing as a charity gig in London in aid of Oxfam’s ‘Make Trade Fair’ campaign. But it was 2005 where things really began to take off for the group: crashing into the top 5 of the indie charts with their debut EP and breaking the iTunes record for an unsigned artist in weekly downloads within a matter of months of each other gave The Aeroplanes the belief and drive to further themselves more. 2005 also saw The Aeroplanes being featured in the movie The Moguls, after Jeff Bridges heard their distinctive sound and personally requested for them to be included on the movie’s soundtrack. Their profile continued to rise as their music was featured on TV programs such as EastEnders, Strictly Come Dancing, as well as US dramas Veronica Mars, One Tree Hill and Cold Case.

In 2006 The Aeroplanes played gigs in Germany, Switzerland and the US where they were invited to perform at the SXSW festival in Austin, Texas. They also performed a full UK tour where they sold out across the country. In 2007 bassist Stuart Palethorpe left the band and was replaced by Vicky Edwards. Once settled work on the new album Broken Hearts and Maladies began, working with Mike Crossey (Arctic Monkeys). Whilst recording The Aeroplanes did not stop they continued their hectic touring schedule performing in major European cities such as Berlin, Oslo, Rome, Naples. Opening for The Prodigy at the Gampel open air festival in Switzerland they played live to a TV and radio audience of over two million people. Back home they have played with the Happy Mondays, The Zutons and The Farm at the Leeds festival, Knowsley festival Liverpool Arena and headlining at the Mathew Street festival.

The band disbanded in 2010, front man Chris Kearney can be found in new band Cold Shoulder.

== Discography ==
=== Albums ===
Broken Hearts & Maladies, 17 November 2008, CD, Robot! Records, ROBOT10
No.	Title	Length
1.	"Black Hole"	3:16
2.	"Slipping Away"	2:44
3.	"Lonely"	2:48
4.	"You Don't Know"	3:09
5.	"Somebody Sleeping"	4:42
6.	"Tonight"	4:04
7.	"The End of the Night"	4:31
8.	"Down Low"	3:38
9.	"Don't Stop Me"	3:18
10.	"This is My Love"	3:34
11.	"Some Days"	3:46
12.	"Rain at Your Door"	4:49
Total length:		43:13

=== Singles ===
This is My Love EP, 20 April 2006, 7"/CD, White Noise, WN005
No.	Title	Length
1.	"This is My Love"	3:33
2.	"Just a Girl"	3:06
3.	"Rain at Your Door (Live on BBC Radio 2)"	3:14
Total length:		10:11

Somedays, 12 Dec 2005, Download only, White Noise
No.	Title	Length
1.	"Somedays"	3:49
2.	"Down Low"	3:38
Total length:		7:27

The Aeroplanes EP, 28 Aug 2005, 10"/CD, White Noise, WN002
No.	Title	Length
1.	"Don't Stop Me"	3:17
2.	"Somedays"	3:49
3.	"Black Hole"	3:27
Total length:		10:31
