= I'll Be in the Sky =

Single by B.o.B

from the album Who the F#*k Is B.o.B? and B.o.B Presents: The Adventures of Bobby Ray
- Released: October 21, 2008
- Recorded: 2008
- Genre: Pop rap; alternative R&B
- Length: 4:06
- Label: Grand Hustle, Atlantic
- Songwriter: Bobby Ray Simmons Jr.
- Producer: B.o.B

B.o.B singles chronology
"I'll Be in the Sky" (2008)	"Hood Dreamer" (2009)

B.o.B singles chronology
"Price Tag" (2011)	"I'll Be in the Sky" (re-release) (2011)	"We Don't Get Down Like Y'all" (2011)

Music video
- "I'll Be in the Sky" on YouTube

"I'll Be in the Sky" is a song by American hip hop recording artist B.o.B. The song, produced by B.o.B himself, was originally included on his fourth mixtape Who the F#*k Is B.o.B? (2008) and was later featured as a bonus track on the European and Japanese editions of his debut album B.o.B Presents: The Adventures of Bobby Ray (2010). The song was initially released for digital download in the United States, on October 21, 2008, and was later serviced as the sixth single from his debut album in the United Kingdom, on January 31, 2011.

== Music video ==
A music video for the song was released by AtlanticVideos, on October 2, 2009. The video was shot in Los Angeles. The video begins on planet earth where the camera zooms in at a hotel where B.o.B and other party people (this was related to Magic) partying inside the hotel. The next scene shifts in on a beach where a group of girls are lying down in the sand with their bikinis on and B.o.B raps his verse while walking and passing other girls. Then, the final scene shows B.o.B and Jack Johnson competing in a surf contest to see who will win. At the end of the video, B.o.B falls off the board and the woman (played by Keri Hilson) rescues him (reminiscent of Pamela Anderson) and kisses him on the cheek and the camera zooms out to Earth.

== Track listing ==
Digital download

1. "I'll Be in the Sky" (Album Version) – 4:06

== Personnel ==
- Lead vocals – Bobby Ray Simmons Jr.
- Producers – Bobby Ray Simmons Jr.
- Lyrics – Bobby Ray Simmons Jr.
- Label: Grand Hustle, Atlantic

== Chart performance ==
"I'll Be in the Sky" first appeared on the UK Singles Chart at number 84 on 16 January 2011. The following week, the single rose 15 places to number 69; before falling 6 places to number 75 on 30 January. The single also made an appearance on the R&B chart, managing to reach a peak of number 23 on 23 January. On 14 January, the single debuted on the Irish Singles Chart at number 47, before climbing 19 places to number 28 the following week. The single continued to rise, reaching a current peak of number 24 on 4 February.

== Charts ==
Chart (2011)	Peak position
Ireland (IRMA)	24
UK Hip Hop/R&B (OCC)	20
UK Singles (OCC)	61
US Bubbling Under R&B/Hip-Hop Singles (Billboard)	5

== Release history ==
Country	Date	Format	Label
United States	October 21, 2008	Digital download	Atlantic Records
United Kingdom	January 31, 2011	Radio	Atlantic Records
