= List of songs recorded by Bruno Mars =

Songs by American singer-songwriter

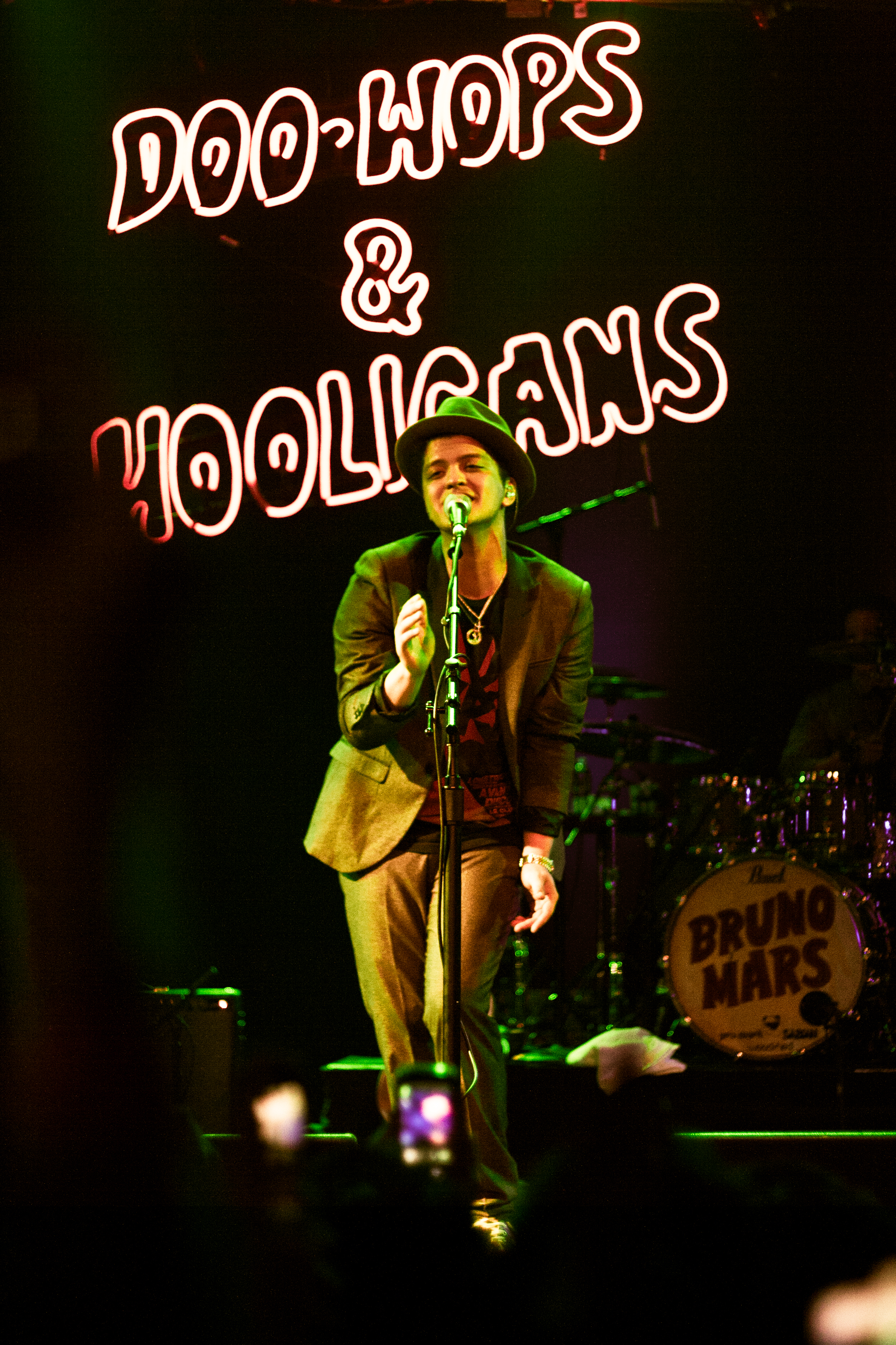
Mars performing in Houston, Texas on November 24, 2010

American singer-songwriter Bruno Mars has recorded songs for three studio albums, one collaborative album, one extended play (EP) and three soundtrack albums. He has also featured as a guest artist and provided background vocals to other songs. After an unsuccessful contract with Motown Records and a fruitless conversation with will.i.am's management, Mars signed with Atlantic Records in 2009. He came to prominence as a composer for other artists with Philip Lawrence and Ari Levine, who called themselves the Smeezingtons. They composed B.o.B's "Nothin' on You" (2009), and Travie McCoy's "Billionaire" (2010); Mars sang on their choruses.

The Smeezingtons composed Mars's debut EP, It's Better If You Don't Understand, released in May 2010, and his debut studio album Doo-Wops & Hooligans, released in October 2010. The album included the songs "Just the Way You Are", "Grenade" and "Runaway Baby". It featured collaborations with Damian Marley, B.o.B and CeeLo Green, and the songs included on the EP, "Somewhere in Brooklyn", "The Other Side", "Count On Me" and "Talking to the Moon". Mars's love for doo-wop music inspired the album which is primarily a pop, reggae pop and R&B record. In 2011, he appeared as a featured artist on Bad Meets Evil's "Lighters" and Lil Wayne's "Mirror". He has contributed songs to soundtracks: "It Will Rain" for The Twilight Saga: Breaking Dawn – Part 1, "Young, Wild & Free" by Snoop Dogg and Wiz Khalifa for Mac & Devin Go to High School and "Welcome Back" for Rio 2.

Mars's second studio album Unorthodox Jukebox, released in December 2012, included the tracks "Locked Out of Heaven", "When I Was Your Man", "Treasure" and "Moonshine". The Smeezingtons collaborated with other producers, including Mark Ronson, Jeff Bhasker and Emile Haynie, to create a disco, funk, pop, reggae, and rock album. Lyrically, it showcases traditional notions of romance, male chauvinism, and sexuality. In 2014, Ronson's single, "Uptown Funk", featured Mars. Shampoo Press & Curl, a production trio formed by Mars, Lawrence and Christopher Brody Brown, composed the tracks on his third studio album, 24K Magic, released in November 2016. It included the songs "24K Magic", "That's What I Like", and a remix of "Finesse" featuring Cardi B. Funk, pop and R&B influenced the creation of this album, which involves subjects of money and sex.

Mars and Anderson .Paak, as Silk Sonic, released the collaborative studio album An Evening with Silk Sonic, in November 2021. It was produced by Mars, D'Mile and The Stereotypes. It includes the singles "Leave the Door Open" and "Smokin out the Window". The album is rooted in R&B, soul, funk, early hip-hop and pop. It explores themes of "seduction, romance", reconciliation and materialism. In 2024, Mars collaborated with Lady Gaga on the single "Die With a Smile" and with Rosé on "APT.". Mars's fourth studio album, The Romantic (2026), was produced by Mars and D'Mile. The lead single, "I Just Might", which incorporates a disco pop and funk sounds.

== Songs ==
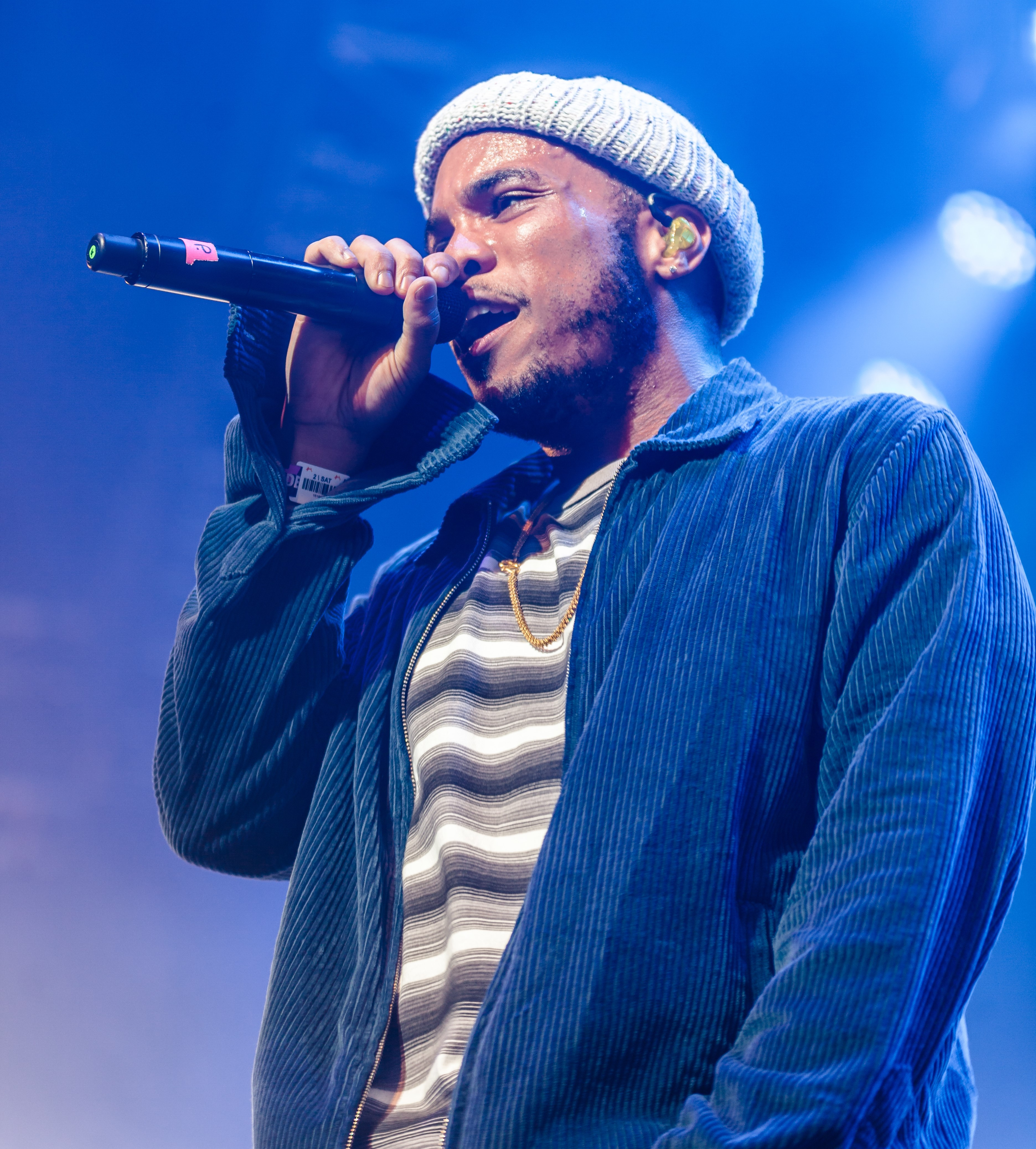
Anderson .Paak co-wrote and recorded the collaborative studio An Evening with Silk Sonic with Mars.

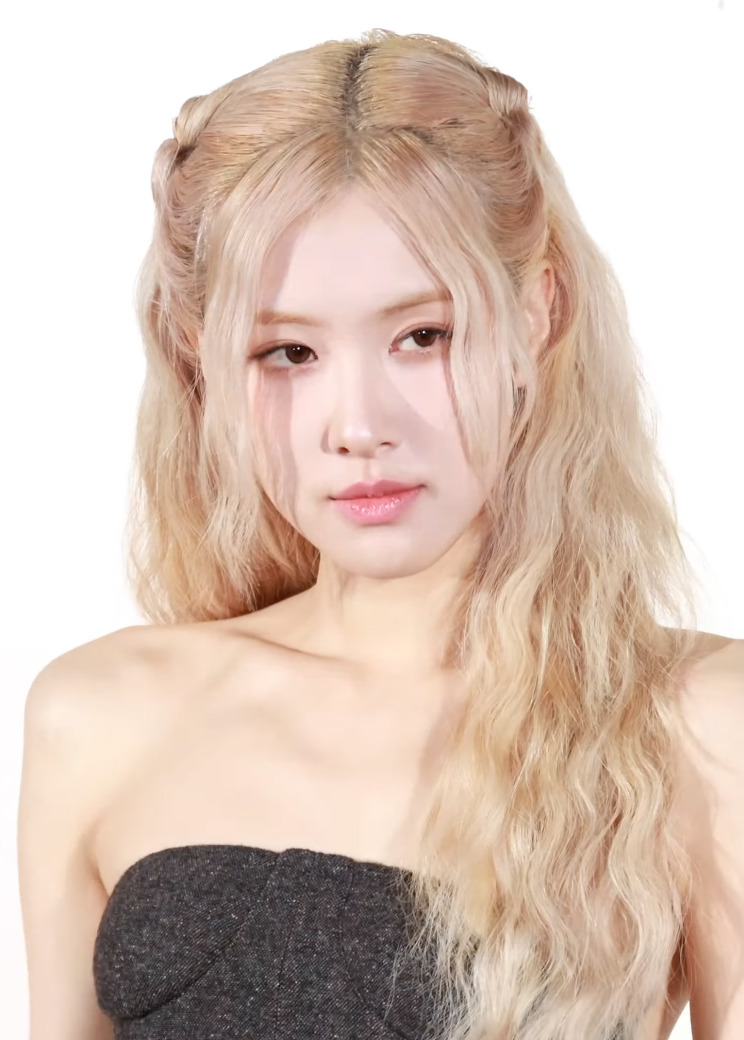
Rosé collaborated with Mars on "APT."

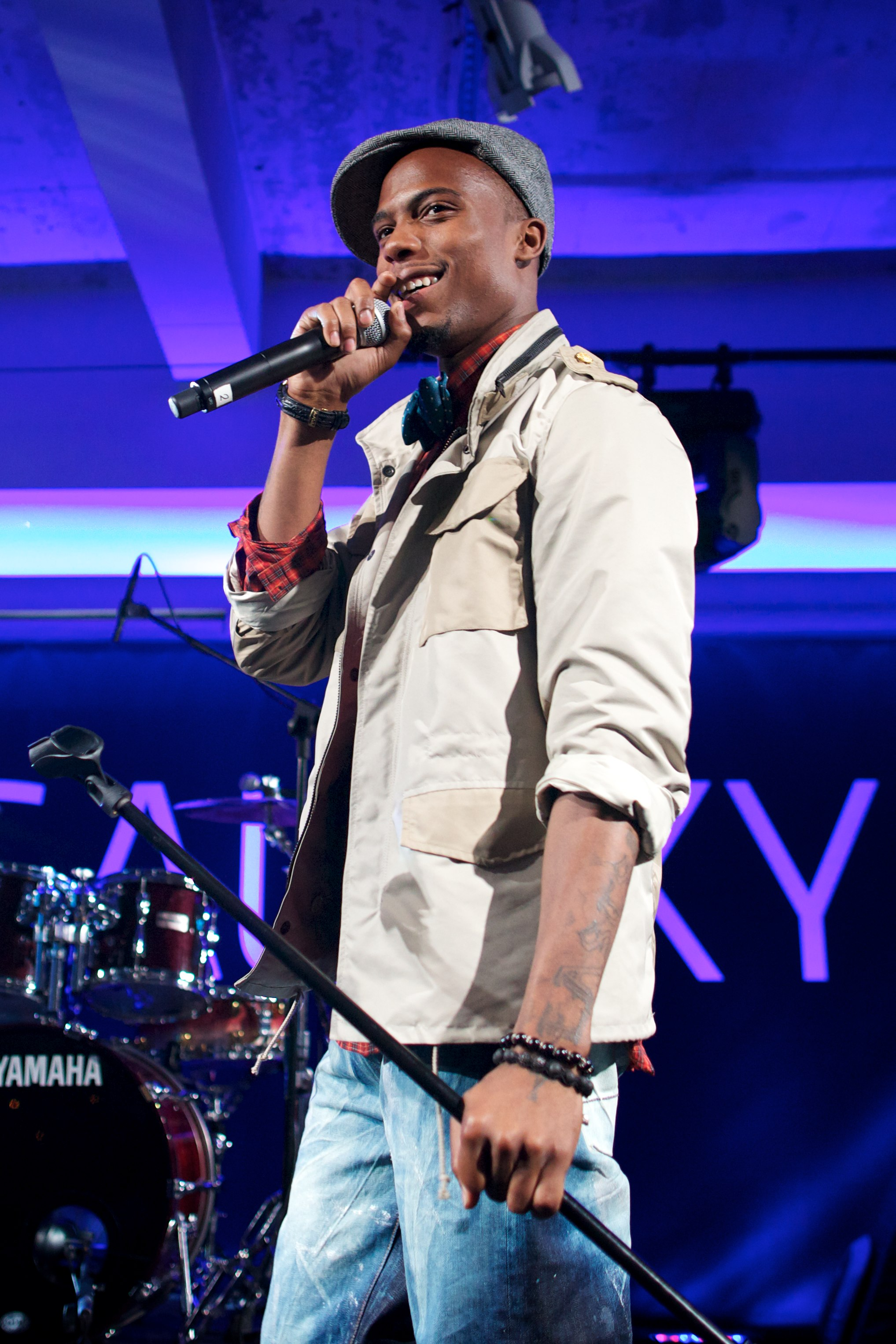
B.o.B collaborated with Mars on "Nothin' on You" and "The Other Side".

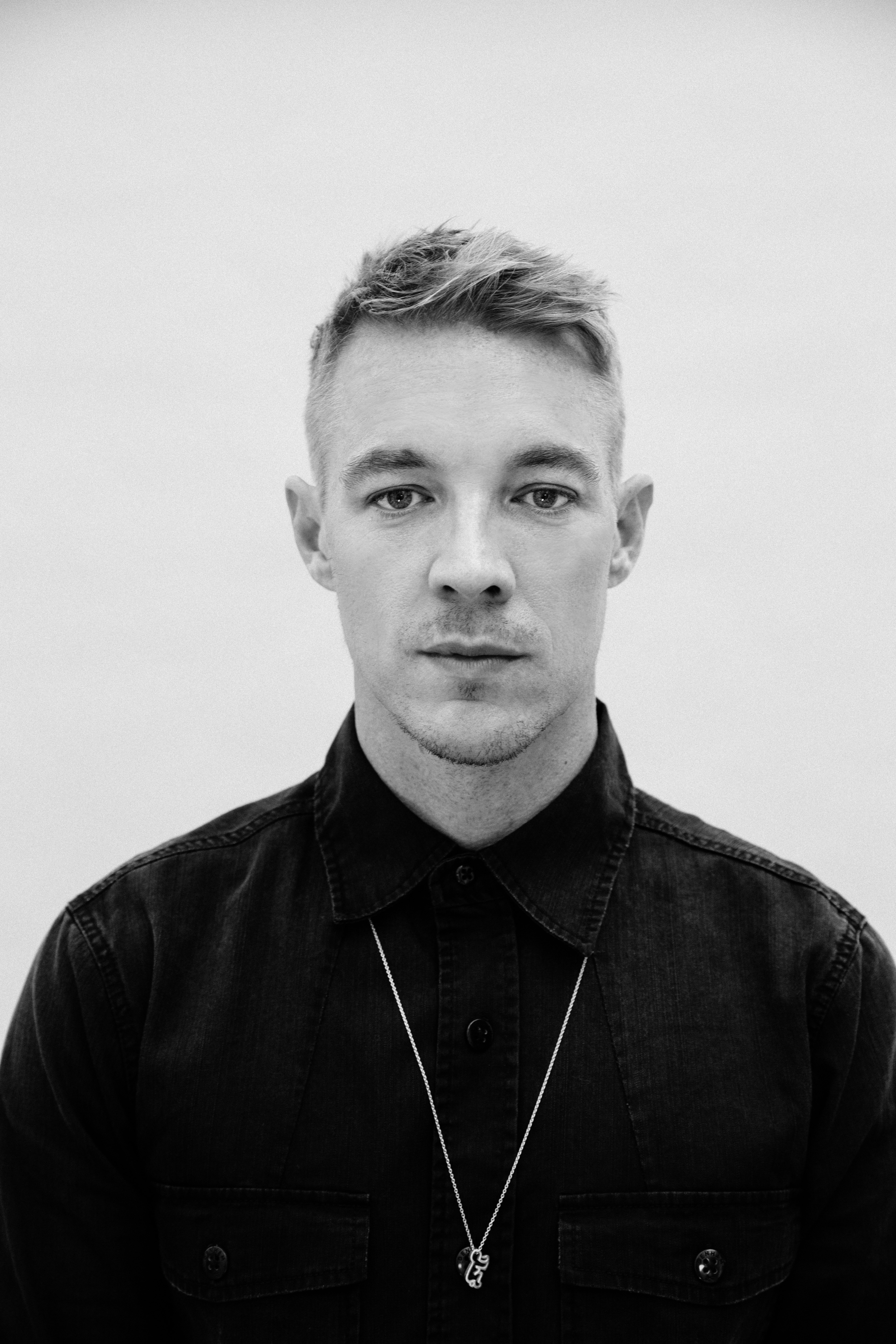
Diplo co-wrote "Bubble Butt", "Liquor Store Blues" and "Money Makes Her Smile".

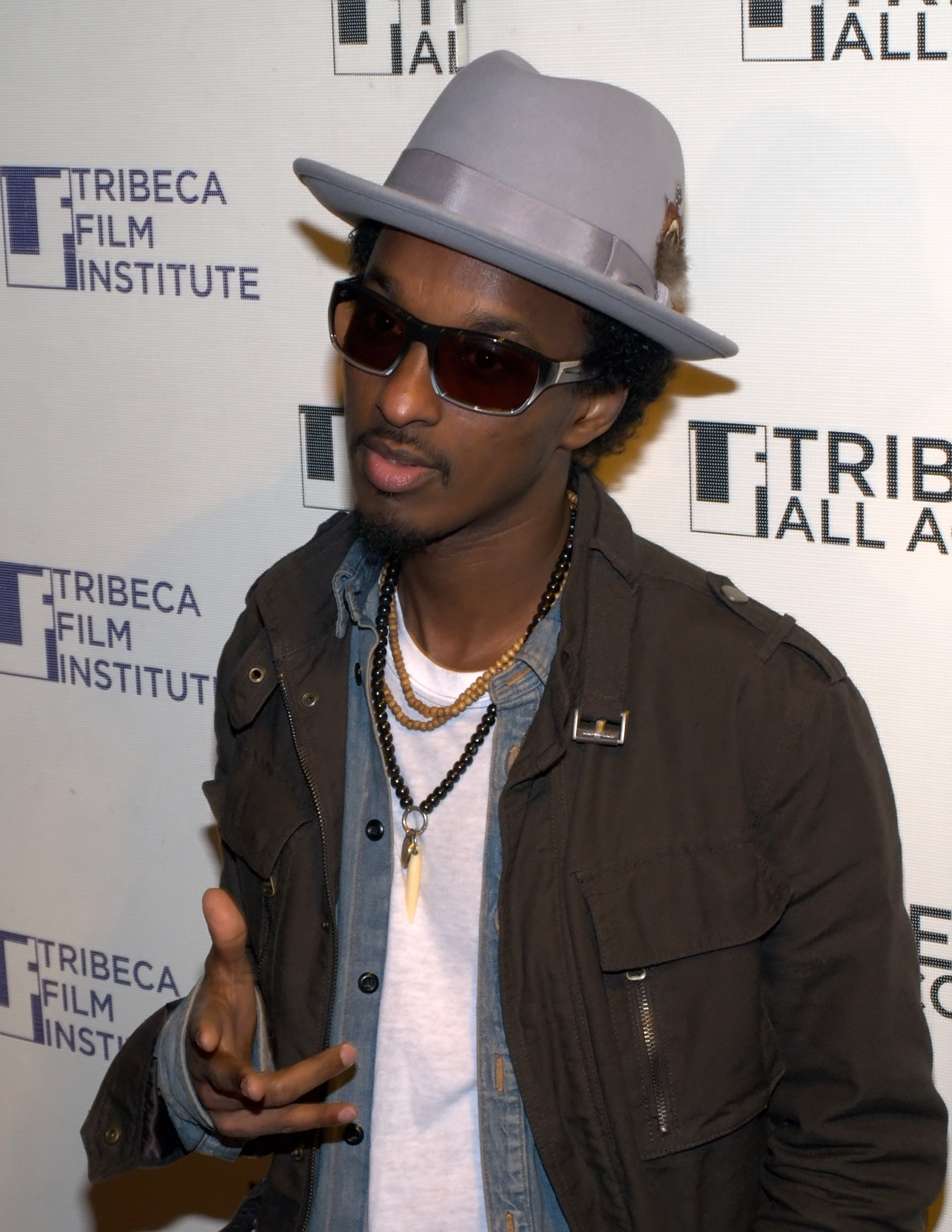
K'naan was one of the co-writers of "Bang Bang", "Wavin' Flag" and "The Lazy Song".

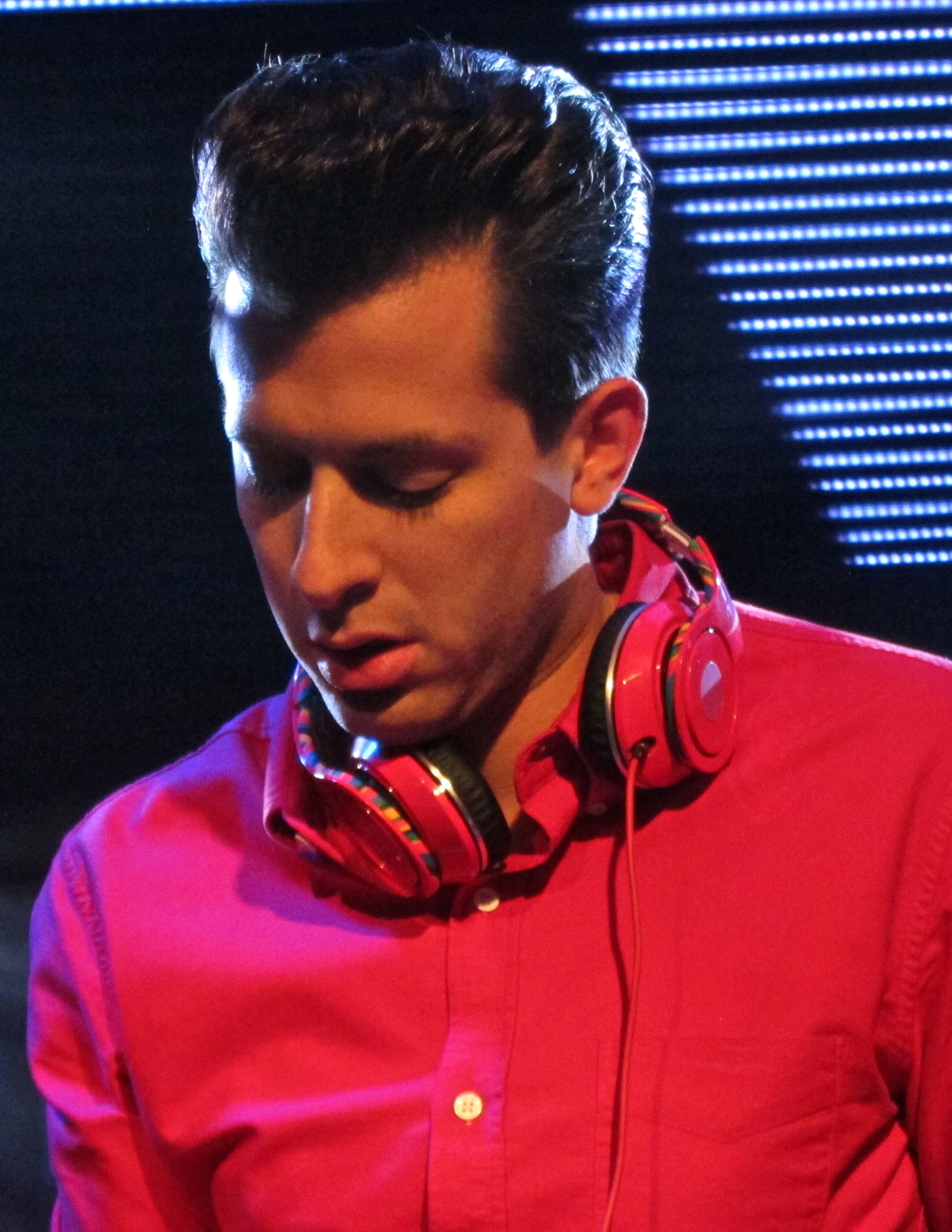
Mark Ronson was among the co-writers of "Gorilla", "Moonshine", "Uptown Funk" and "Feel Right".

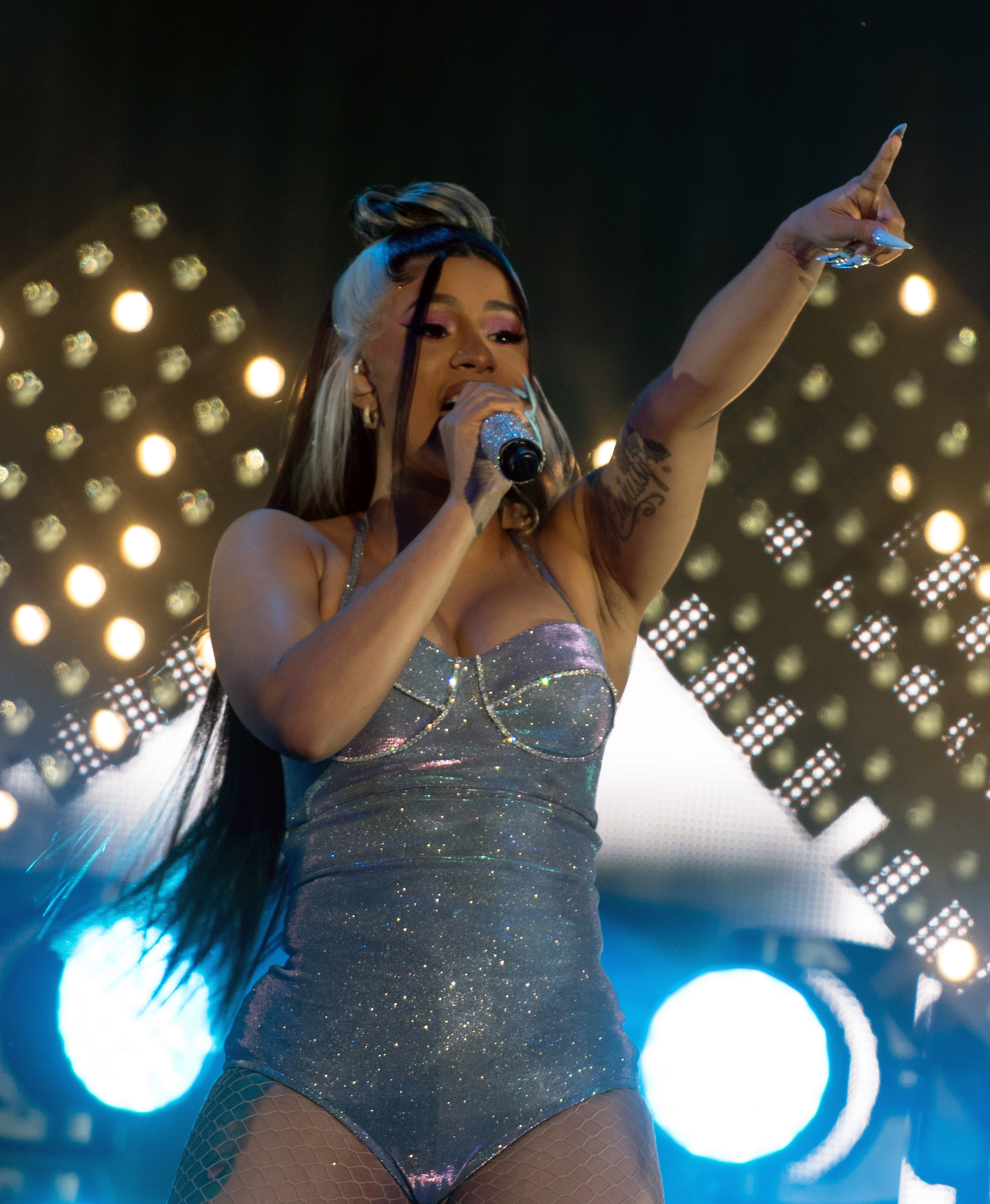
Mars collaborated with Cardi B on "Finesse" and "Please Me".

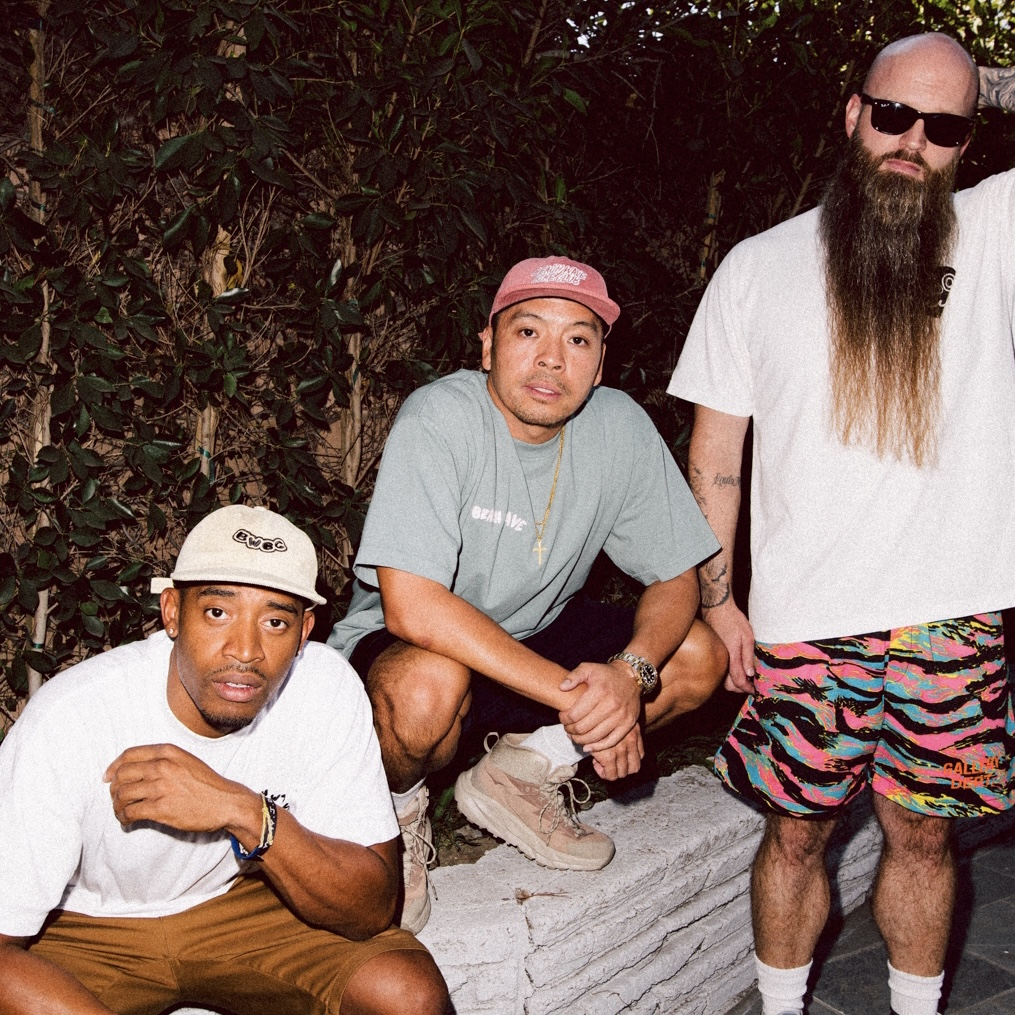
The Stereotypes were among the co-writers of "After Last Night", "Finesse", "Please Me" and "That's What I Like"

Key
| # | Indicates songs with background vocals by Mars |
| † | Indicates songs with uncredited vocals by Mars |

Name of song, featured performers, writer(s), original release, and year of release
| Song | Artist(s) | Writer(s) | Album | Year | Ref. |
|---|---|---|---|---|---|
| "777" | Bruno Mars, Anderson .Paak as Silk Sonic | Bruno Mars; Brandon Anderson; Dernst Emile II; Christopher Brody Brown | An Evening with Silk Sonic | 2021 | |
| "6 AM" † (Note: Bruno Mars was not credited as a featured artist on the first release of "6AM". In 2012, he was credited on Bueno's mixtape Maloof Money, Vol. 3 (Executive Decisions).) | Bueno | Bueno; Bruno Mars; Jonathan Yip; Ray Romulus; Jeremy Reeves | Can't Knock The Hustle | 2009 | |
| "24K Magic" # | Bruno Mars | Bruno Mars; Philip Lawrence; Christopher Brody Brown | 24K Magic | 2016 | |
| "3D" | Far East Movement (featuring Bruno Mars) | Jonathan Yip; Ray Romulus; Jeremy Reeves; Peter Hernandez; Kevin Nishimura; James Roh; Jae Choung | Animal | 2009 | |
| "After Last Night" | Bruno Mars, Anderson .Paak as Silk Sonic (with Thundercat and Bootsy Collins) | Bruno Mars; Brandon Anderson; Dernst Emile II; James Fauntleroy; Stephen Bruner; Johnathan Yip; Ray Romulus; Jeremy Reeves; Ray McCullough II | An Evening with Silk Sonic | 2021 | |
| "APT." | Rosé, Bruno Mars | Chae Young Park; Bruno Mars; Amy Allen; Christopher Brody Brown; Rogét Chahayed; Omer Fedi; Phillip Lawrence; Theron Thomas; Henry Walter; Michael Chapman; Nicholas Chinn | Rosie | 2024 | |
| "Available" # | Flo Rida (featuring Akon) | Tramar Dillard; William Adams; Aliaune Thiam; Harold Clayton; Sigidi Abdullah | R.O.O.T.S. | 2009 | |
| "Bang Bang" # | K'naan featuring (featuring Adam Levine) | Keinan Abdi Warsame; Bruno Mars; Philip Lawrence | Troubadour | 2009 | |
| "Billionaire" | Travie McCoy (featuring Bruno Mars) | Travie McCoy; Bruno Mars; Philip Lawrence; Ari Levine | Lazarus | 2010 | |
| "Blast Off" | Bruno Mars, Anderson .Paak as Silk Sonic | Bruno Mars; Brandon Anderson; Dernst Emile II | An Evening with Silk Sonic | 2021 | |
| "Bonde do Brunão" | Bruno Mars | Bruno Mars; Jonathan Yip; Ray Romulus; Jeremy Reeves | Non-album single | 2025 | |
| "Blow" | Ed Sheeran, Chris Stapleton, Bruno Mars | Ed Sheeran; Chris Stapleton; Bruno Mars; Brody Brown; Frank Rogers; J.T. Cure; Bard McNamee; Gregory McKee | No.6 Collaborations Project | 2019 | |
| "Bruno San's Theme Song" | Bruno Mars | Bruno Mars; Jeffrey Baranowski; Luke Jay Milano; Jeremy Reeves; Ray Romolus; Jonathan Yip | Non-album single | 2024 | |
| "Bubble Butt" (Note: A remix featuring 2 Chainz was released in May 2013. 2 Chainz wrote his own parts and is only credited as a writer and as a vocalist on the remixed single version.) | Major Lazer (featuring Bruno Mars, Tyga & Mystic) | Thomas Pentz; David Taylor; Bruno Mars; Michael Stevenson; Mystic | Free the Universe | 2013 | |
| "Calling All My Lovelies" # | Bruno Mars | Bruno Mars; Philip Lawrence; Christopher Brody Brown; Emile Haynie; Jeff Bhasker | 24K Magic | 2016 | |
| "Can't Come Back to Me" (Note: Bruno Mars was credited as a featured artist on the first release of "Can't Come Back to Me" in 2012. In 2016, the song was included on Layzie Bone's Mo Thug Boss with Mars's vocals not credited.) | Layzie Bone (featuring Bruno Mars) | Steven Howse | Mo Thug Boss | 2012 | |
| "Cha Cha Cha" | Bruno Mars | Bruno Mars; Dernst Emile II; Philip Lawrence; Brody Brown; James Fauntleroy; Terius Gray | The Romantic | 2026 | |
| "Chunky" # | Bruno Mars | Bruno Mars; Philip Lawrence; Christopher Brody Brown; James Fauntleroy | 24K Magic | 2016 | |
| "Come to Brazil" | Bruno Mars | Bruno Mars; Jonathan Yip; Ray Romulus; Jeremy Reeves | Non-album single | 2024 | |
| "Count On Me" | Bruno Mars | Bruno Mars; Philip Lawrence; Ari Levine | Doo-Wops & Hooligans | 2010 | |
| "Dance with Me" | Bruno Mars | Bruno Mars; Dernst Emile II; James Fauntleroy | The Romantic | 2026 | |
| "Die With a Smile" | Lady Gaga, Bruno Mars | Bruno Mars; Stefani Germanotta; Dernst Emile II; Andrew Watt; James Fauntleroy | Mayhem | 2024 | |
| "Fat, Juicy and Wet" | Sexyy Red, Bruno Mars | Janae Wherry; Bruno Mars; Johnathan Yip; Ray Romulus; Jeremy Reeves; Kameron Glasper | Non-album single | 2025 | |
| "Feel Right" # | Mark Ronson (featuring Mystikal) | Mark Ronson; Michael Tyler; Bruno Mars; Philip Lawrence; Brody Brown; Nick Movshon; Homer Steinweiss; Thomas Brenneck | Uptown Special | 2014 | |
| "Finesse" (Note: A remix version featuring Cardi B was released as a single and it is only included on the deluxe edition of 24K Magic. Cardi B wrote her own parts with Klenord Raphael and is only credited as a writer and as a vocalist on the single version.) # | Bruno Mars | Bruno Mars; Philip Lawrence; Christopher Brody Brown; James Fauntleroy; Johnathan Yip; Ray Romulus; Jeremy Reeves; Ray McCullough II | 24K Magic | 2016 | |
| "Fly as Me" | Bruno Mars, Anderson .Paak as Silk Sonic | Bruno Mars randon Anderson; Dernst Emile II; James Fauntleroy; Sean Anderson | An Evening with Silk Sonic | 2021 | |
| "Forever Valentine" # | Charlie Wilson | Charlie Wilson; Bruno Mars; Dernst Emile II; Johnathan Yip; Ray Romulus; Jeremy Reeves; Ray McCullough II; Micah Powell; Seth Reger | Non-album single | 2020 | |
| "God Was Showing Off" | Bruno Mars | Bruno Mars; Dernst Emile II; Philip Lawrence; James Fauntleroy; Homer Steinweiss; Leon Michels; Dave Guy | The Romantic | 2026 | |
| "Gorilla" | Bruno Mars | Bruno Mars; Philip Lawrence; Ari Levine | Unorthodox Jukebox | 2012 | |
| "Grenade" | Bruno Mars | Bruno Mars; Philip Lawrence; Ari Levine; Brody Brown; Claude Kelly; Andrew Wyatt | Doo-Wops & Hooligans | 2010 | |
| "Her World Goes On" † (Note: Mars's vocals are not credited.) | Justin Michael, Kemal | Bruno Mars; Justin Michael; Kemal Golden | Non-album single | 2010 | |
| "I Just Might" | Bruno Mars | Bruno Mars; Dernst Emile II; Philip Lawrence; Brody Brown | The Romantic | 2026 | |
| "If I Knew" | Bruno Mars | Bruno Mars; Philip Lawrence; Ari Levine | Unorthodox Jukebox | 2012 | |
| "It Will Rain" | Bruno Mars | Bruno Mars; Philip Lawrence; Ari Levine | The Twilight Saga: Breaking Dawn – Part 1 | 2011 | |
| "Just the Way You Are" | Bruno Mars | Bruno Mars; Philip Lawrence; Ari Levine; Khalil Walton; Khari Cain | Doo-Wops & Hooligans | 2010 | |
| "Leave the Door Open" | Bruno Mars, Anderson .Paak as Silk Sonic | Bruno Mars; Brandon Anderson; Dernst Emile II; Christopher Brody Brown | An Evening with Silk Sonic | 2021 | |
| "Lighters" | Bad Meets Evil (featuring Bruno Mars) | Bruno Mars; Philip Lawrence; Ari Levine; Marshall Mathers; Ryan Montgomery; Roy Battle | Hell: The Sequel | 2011 | |
| "Liquor Store Blues" | Bruno Mars (featuring Damian Marley) | Bruno Mars; Philip Lawrence; Ari Levine; Dwayne Chin-Quee; Mitchum Chin; Damian Marley; Thomas Pentz | Doo-Wops & Hooligans | 2010 | |
| "Locked Out of Heaven" | Bruno Mars | Bruno Mars; Philip Lawrence; Ari Levine | Unorthodox Jukebox | 2012 | |
| "Love" (Note: Mars was not credited as a featured artist on the first release of "Love". He was credited on the album Glory.) | Jaeson Ma (featuring Bruno Mars) | Jaeson Ma; Peter Hernandez | Glory | 2010 | |
| "Love's Train" | Bruno Mars, Anderson .Paak as Silk Sonic | Michael Cooper; Felton C. Pilate II | An Evening with Silk Sonic | 2022 | |
| "Marry You" | Bruno Mars | Bruno Mars; Philip Lawrence; Ari Levine | Doo-Wops & Hooligans | 2010 | |
| "Mirror" | Lil Wayne (featuring Bruno Mars) | Dwayne Carter; Peter Hernandez; Philip Lawrence; Ramon Owen | Tha Carter IV Deluxe edition | 2011 | |
| "Money Make Her Smile" | Bruno Mars | Bruno Mars; Philip Lawrence; Ari Levine; Christopher Brown | Unorthodox Jukebox | 2012 | |
| "Moonshine" | Bruno Mars | Bruno Mars; Philip Lawrence; Ari Levine; Andrew Wyatt; Jeff Bhasker; Mark Ronson | Unorthodox Jukebox | 2012 | |
| "Natalie" | Bruno Mars | Bruno Mars; Philip Lawrence; Ari Levine; Benjamin Levin; Paul Epworth | Unorthodox Jukebox | 2012 | |
| "Nothin' on You" | B.o.B (featuring Bruno Mars) | Bobby Simmons Jr. Bruno Mars; Philip Lawrence; Ari Levine | B.o.B Presents: The Adventures of Bobby Ray | 2009 | |
| "Nothing Left" | Bruno Mars | Bruno Mars; Dernst Emile II | The Romantic | 2026 | |
| "Old & Crazy" | Bruno Mars (featuring Esperanza Spalding) | Bruno Mars; Jeff Bhasker | Unorthodox Jukebox | 2012 | |
| "On My Soul" | Bruno Mars | Bruno Mars; Dernst Emile II; Philip Lawrence; James Fauntleroy | The Romantic | 2026 | |
| "One At a Time" † | Travie McCoy | Travie McCoy; Peter Gene Hernandez; Philip Lawrence; Ari Levine | Non-album single | 2009 | |
| "One Day" # | Matisyahu | Matthew Miller; Bruno Mars; Philip Lawrence; Ari Levine | Light | 2009 | |
| "Our First Time" | Bruno Mars | Bruno Mars; Philip Lawrence; Ari Levine; Dwayne Chin-Quee; Mitchum Chin | Doo-Wops & Hooligans | 2010 | |
| "Perm" # | Bruno Mars | Bruno Mars; Philip Lawrence; Christopher Brody Brown; James Fauntleroy; Homer Steinweiss; Trevor Lawrence Jr. | 24K Magic | 2016 | |
| "Please Me" | Bruno Mars, Cardi B | Bruno Mars; Belcalis Almanzar; James Fauntleroy; Johnathan Yip; Ray Romulus; Jeremy Reeves; Ray McCullough II | Am I the Drama? | 2019 | |
| "Put On a Smile" | Bruno Mars, Anderson .Paak as Silk Sonic | Bruno Mars; Brandon Anderson; Dernst Emile II | An Evening with Silk Sonic | 2021 | |
| "Risk It All" | Bruno Mars | Bruno Mars; Dernst Emile II; Philip LawrenceJ ames Fauntleroy | The Romantic | 2026 | |
| "Runaway Baby" | Bruno Mars | Bruno Mars; Philip Lawrence; Ari Levine | Doo-Wops & Hooligans | 2010 | |
| Runway # | Lady Gaga, Doechii | Andrew Watt; Bruno Mars; Dernst Emile II; Henry Walter; Jayda Love; Jaylah Hickmon; Stefani Germanotta | The Devil Wears Prada 2 | 2026 | |
| "Silk Sonic Intro" | Bruno Mars, Anderson .Paak as Silk Sonic | Bruno Mars; Brandon Anderson; Dernst Emile II | An Evening with Silk Sonic | 2021 | |
| "Show Me" | Bruno Mars | Bruno Mars; Philip Lawrence; Ari Levine; Dwayne Chin-Quee; Mitchum Chin | Unorthodox Jukebox | 2012 | |
| "Smokin out the Window" | Bruno Mars, Anderson Paak as Silk Sonic | Bruno Mars; Brandon Anderson; Dernst Emile II | An Evening with Silk Sonic | 2021 | |
| "Skate" | Bruno Mars, Anderson Paak as Silk Sonic | Bruno Mars; Brandon Anderson; Dernst Emile II; James Fauntleroy; Domitille Degalle; JD Beck | An Evening with Silk Sonic | 2021 | |
| "Something Serious" | Bruno Mars | Bruno Mars; Dernst Emile II | The Romantic | 2026 | |
| "Somewhere in Brooklyn" | Bruno Mars | Bruno Mars; Philip Lawrence; Ari Levine | Doo-Wops & Hooligans | 2010 | |
| "Straight Up & Down" # | Bruno Mars | Bruno Mars; Philip Lawrence; Christopher Brody Brown; Faheem Najm; Carl Martin; Marc Gay | 24K Magic | 2016 | |
| "Still" | Karol G, Bruno Mars | Carolina Giraldo; Peter Hernandez; Alexandra Yatchenko; Isabel LaRosa; Thomas LaRosa | No Me Arrepiento de Sentir Tanto | 2026 | |
| "Sugar, Cocoa and Honey" | Bigg Gipp (featuring Bruno Mars) | — (Note: "Sugar, Cocoa and Honey" does not have songwriter credits.) | Mr. Get Down | 2014 | |
| "Talking to the Moon" | Bruno Mars | Bruno Mars; Philip Lawrence; Ari Levine; Albert Winkler; Jeff Bhasker | Doo-Wops & Hooligans | 2010 | |
| "Tears Always Win" # | Alicia Keys | Alicia Keys; Jeff Bhasker; Bruno Mars; Phillip Lawrence | Girl on Fire | 2012 | |
| "That's What I Like" # | Bruno Mars | Bruno Mars; Philip Lawrence; Christopher Brody Brown; James Fauntleroy; Johnathan Yip; Ray Romulus; Jeremy Reeves; Ray McCullough II | 24K Magic | 2016 | |
| "That's Why I Love You" | Victoria Monét (featuring Bruno Mars) | Monét; Bruno Mars; Darhyl Camper; Dernst Emile II; Solána Rowe | Frequency of Love | 2026 | |
| "The Lazy Song" | Bruno Mars | Bruno Mars; Philip Lawrence; Ari Levine; K'naan | Doo-Wops & Hooligans | 2010 | |
| "The Other Side" | Bruno Mars (featuring B.o.B and CeeLo Green) | Bruno Mars; Philip Lawrence; Ari Levine; Brody Brown; Mike Caren; Patrick Stump; Kaveh Rastegar; John Wicks; Jeremy Ruzumna; Joshua Lopez; Bobby Simmons Jr. | Doo-Wops & Hooligans | 2010 | |
| "This Is My Love" (Note: "This Is My Love" embodies portions of the composition entitled "Love" written and performed by Jaeson Ma and Mars.) | Gold 1 (featuring Bruno Mars and Jaeson Ma) | David Kolodziej; Jaeson Ma; Marc Zibung; Michel Schuhmacher; Stephen Singer; Giorgilli Giovanbattista | Non-album single | 2012 | |
| "Too Good to Say Goodbye" # | Bruno Mars | Bruno Mars; Philip Lawrence; Christopher Brody Brown; Jeff Bhasker; Kenneth "Babyface" Edmonds | 24K Magic | 2016 | |
| "Treasure" | Bruno Mars | Bruno Mars; Philip Lawrence; Ari Levine; Phredley Brown; Thibaut Berland; Christopher Khan | Unorthodox Jukebox | 2012 | |
| "Uptown Funk" | Mark Ronson (featuring Bruno Mars) | Mark Ronson; Bruno Mars; Philip Lawrence; Jeff Bhasker; Nicholas Williams; Devon Gallaspy; Lonnie Simmons; Charles Wilson; Ronnie Wilson; Robert Wilson; Rudolph Taylor | Uptown Special | 2014 | |
| "Versace on the Floor" # | Bruno Mars | Bruno Mars; Philip Lawrence; Christopher Brody Brown; James Fauntleroy | 24K Magic | 2016 | |
| "Wait for You" # | Sugababes | Fernando Garibay; Bruno Mars; Philip Lawrence | Sweet 7 | 2010 | |
| "Walls Come Down" | Keke Palmer (featuring Bruno Mars) | Steven Battey; Carlos Battey; Fernando Garibay; Bruno Mars; Philip Lawrence | Awaken Reloaded | 2011 | |
| "Wake Up in the Sky" | Gucci Mane, Bruno Mars, Kodak Black | Radric Davis; Peter Hernandez; Bill Kapri; Chance Youngblood; Dwan Avery; Jeff LaCroix | Evil Genius | 2018 | |
| "Watching Her Move" † | Justin Michael, Blake Reary | Justin Michael; Bruno Mars; Blake Reary | Non-album single | 2009 | |
| "Wavin' Flag" (Note: Various versions of this song were released featuring different lyrics and composition from the original version.) # | K'naan | Keinan Abdi Warsame; Bruno Mars; Philip Lawrence; Jean Daval | Troubadour | 2009 | |
| "Welcome Back" | Bruno Mars | Bruno Mars; Philip Lawrence; John Powell | Rio 2 | 2014 | |
| "We'll Be Alright" # | Travie McCoy | Bruno Mars; Philip Lawrence; Jeremy Reeves; Ray Romulus; Jonathan Yip; Rob Coombes; Danny Goffey; Mick Quinn | Lazarus | 2010 | |
| "When I Was Your Man" | Bruno Mars | Bruno Mars; Philip Lawrence; Ari Levine; Andrew Wyatt | Unorthodox Jukebox | 2012 | |
| "Why You Wanna Fight?" | Bruno Mars | Bruno Mars; Dernst Emile II; Brody Brown | The Romantic | 2026 | |
| "Young Girls" | Bruno Mars | Bruno Mars; Philip Lawrence; Ari Levine; Jeff Bhasker; Emile Haynie; Mac Davis | Unorthodox Jukebox | 2012 | |
| "Young, Wild & Free" | Snoop Dogg, Wiz Khalifa (featuring Bruno Mars) | Calvin Broadus; Cameron Thomaz; Peter Hernandez; Philip Lawrence; Ari Levine; Christopher Brown; Keenon Jackson; Tyrone Griffin; Nye Lee; Marlon Borrow; Marquise Newman; Ted Bluechel; Max Bennett; Larry Carlton; John Guerin; Joe Sample; Tom Scott | Mac & Devin Go to High School | 2011 | |
