= The Romantic Tour =

2026 concert tour by Bruno Mars

- Intercontinental tour by Bruno Mars
- Promotional poster
- Location: Asia; Europe; North America; Oceania
- Associated album: The Romantic
- Start date: April 10, 2026
- End date: May 30, 2027
- No. of shows: 127
- Supporting acts: DJ Pee .Wee; Leon Thomas; Victoria Monét; Raye; Tyla

Bruno Mars concert chronology
- Bruno Mars Live (2022–24); The Romantic Tour (2026–27)

The Romantic Tour is the ongoing headlining concert tour by American singer-songwriter Bruno Mars, in support of his fourth studio album, The Romantic (2026).

The tour began on April 10, 2026, in Paradise, and is set to conclude on May 30, 2027, in Goyang. Anderson .Paak (under the pseudonym DJ Pee .Wee), Leon Thomas, Victoria Monét, Raye and Tyla are scheduled to be opening acts. It is Mars' first live performance since his Park MGM residency in 2025 and first tour since the Bruno Mars Live tour (2022–2024).

Originally a 39-date-long stadium tour, The Romantic Tour set the record for the highest first-day ticket sales for the Live Nation pre-sale in North America, leading to an additional 32 dates being announced in North America and Europe. In June 2026, an Asia and Oceania leg was added, which is set to take place between January 2027 and May 30, 2027; the tour included a record 12 stadium shows in Japan.

== Announcement ==
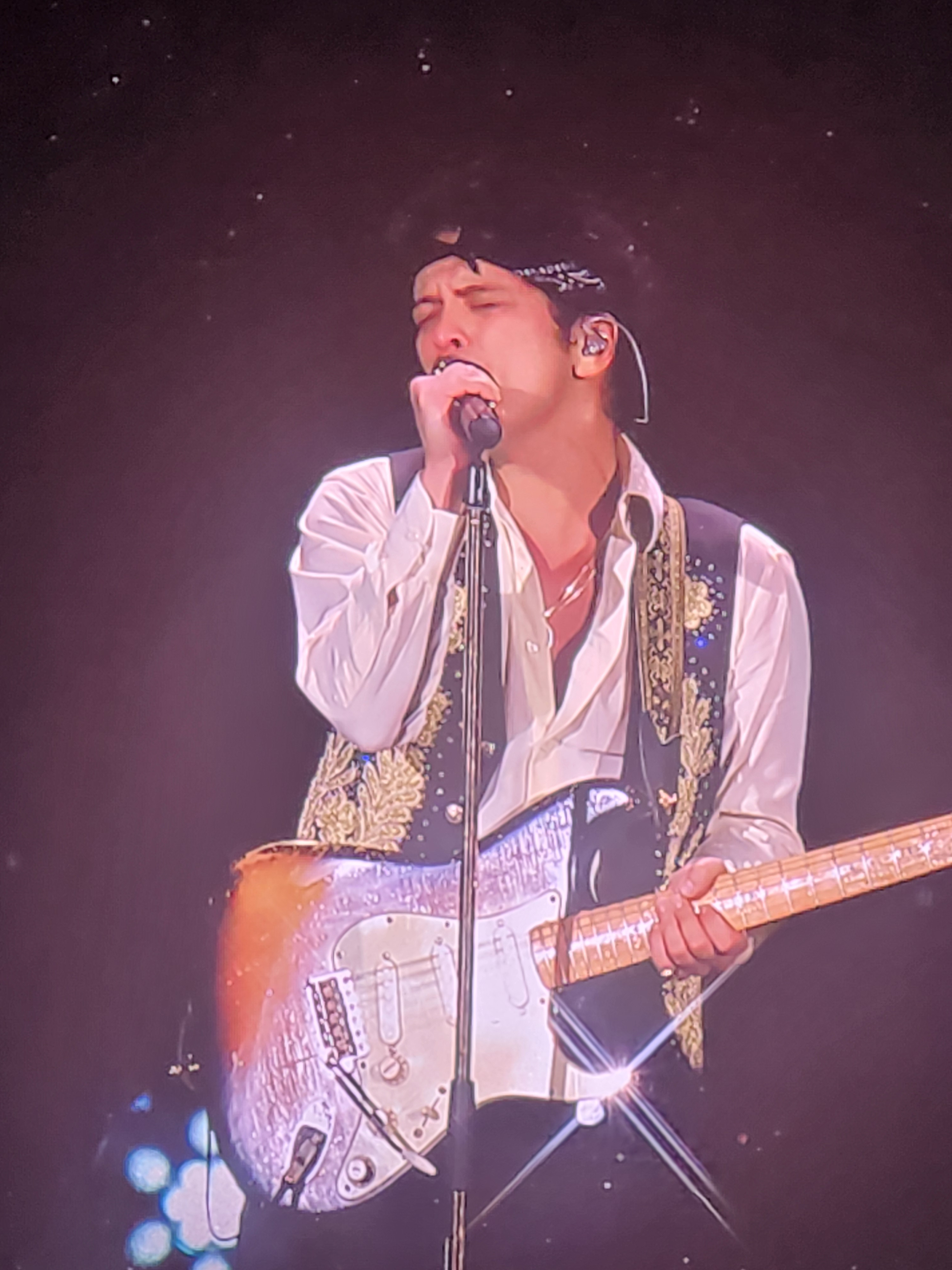
Mars performing in 2026 at the Rogers Stadium during The Romantic Tour

On January 5, 2026, Mars announced on X that he concluded production on his fourth album. On January 7, Mars revealed the album's artwork and title, and that it will be released on February 27. A day later, Mars announced the Romantic Tour, his first all-stadium tour in North America and Europe, with Anderson .Paak (under the pseudonym DJ Pee .Wee), Leon Thomas, Victoria Monét, Raye and Tyla as the tour's opening acts.

After the tour set the record for biggest single-day ticket sales for the Live Nation pre-sale in North America, an additional 32 dates were added to the 39-date tour. On January 9, the album's lead single, "I Just Might", was released and on February 27, the full album was released. A few days later, on March 5, an additional date in both Los Angeles and Vancouver, and four dates at the Estadio GNP Seguros in Mexico City were announced, respectively. A fifth date was later added to Mexico City. In 2027, Mars will tour in Asia, Australia, and New Zealand.

The Hooligans played alongside new added members; Enrique Sanchez, Daniel Rodriguez, Jaron Regan, Chris Payton, Marcus Paul, and Quintin Gulledge. The latter three are from the Dirty Thirty band.

== Promotion ==
In April 2026, MGM Resorts International named Park Avenue, the street between Park MGM and T-Mobile Arena, "Bruno Mars Drive". To commemorate the renaming of the avenue a parade and ceremony will take place. The event will celebrate Mars's ties to Las Vegas, such as his residency at Dolby Live at Park MGM. It will also promote his tour that starts that evening at Allegiant Stadium.

It was later reported WWE recorded materials at one of Mars' concerts at Allegiant Stadium, where WWE held WrestleMania 42 a week later.

Beginning on August 26 2026, following the announcement of additional dates across Asia, Australia and New Zealand, a special performance featuring Silk Sonic was advertised in concert promotion posters.

A video of his "Dance With Me" performance on tour was premiered at the 2026 MTV Video Music Awards.

== Set list ==
This set list is from the April 10, 2026, concert in Paradise, Nevada. The list evolved over the course of the tour, and sometimes included other numbers.

1. "Risk It All"
2. "Cha Cha Cha"
3. "On My Soul"
4. "24K Magic"
5. "Treasure"
6. "God Was Showing Off"
7. "I Just Might"
8. "Perm"
9. "Why You Wanna Fight"
10. Low Rider Medley ("Oh Girl", "Miss You", "Everything", "Wannabe", "That's What I Like")
11. "Something Serious"
12. "Blast Off"
13. "Silk Sonic Intro"
14. "777"
15. "Fly as Me"
16. "Smokin out the Window"
17. "Leave the Door Open"
18. "Marry You"
19. "Die with a Smile"
20. "It Will Rain"
21. "Talking to the Moon"
22. "When I Was Your Man"
23. "Locked Out of Heaven"
24. "Just the Way You Are"
25. "Uptown Funk"
26. "Dance With Me"

Notes

- Some shows end with "Uptown Funk", with "Dance With Me" being cut from the set list. Starting with the Los Angeles shows, “Dance With Me” was played before “Uptown Funk.”
- Beginning with the Berlin shows, "Grenade" was added to the set list after "Talking to the Moon".
- Some shows had a different Low Rider Medley ("Oh Girl", "Miss You", "You Are Everything", "Wannabe", "Let's Get It On", "Please Me", "Still")

== Tour dates ==
List of 2026 concerts, showing date, city, country, venue, opening acts, attendance, and revenue
Date (2026)	City	Country	Venue	Opening acts	Attendance	Revenue
April 10	Paradise (Note: Promoted as Las Vegas.)	United States	Allegiant Stadium	DJ Pee .Wee; Leon Thomas	—	—
April 11	Paradise	United States	Allegiant Stadium	DJ Pee .Wee; Leon Thomas	—	—
April 14	Glendale	United States	State Farm Stadium	DJ Pee .Wee; Leon Thomas	—	—
April 15	Glendale	United States	State Farm Stadium	DJ Pee .Wee; Leon Thomas	—	—
April 18	Arlington	United States	Globe Life Field	DJ Pee .Wee; Leon Thomas	—	—
April 19	Arlington	United States	Globe Life Field	DJ Pee .Wee; Leon Thomas	—	—
April 22	Houston	United States	NRG Stadium	DJ Pee .Wee; Leon Thomas	—	—
April 25	Atlanta	United States	Bobby Dodd Stadium	DJ Pee .Wee; Leon Thomas	—	—
April 26	Atlanta	United States	Bobby Dodd Stadium	DJ Pee .Wee; Leon Thomas	—	—
April 29	Charlotte	United States	Bank of America Stadium	DJ Pee .Wee; Leon Thomas	—	—
May 2	Landover	United States	Northwest Stadium	DJ Pee .Wee; Leon Thomas	—	—
May 3	Landover	United States	Northwest Stadium	DJ Pee .Wee; Leon Thomas	—	—
May 6	Nashville	United States	Nissan Stadium	DJ Pee .Wee; Leon Thomas	—	—
May 9	Detroit	United States	Ford Field	DJ Pee .Wee; Leon Thomas	—	—
May 10	Detroit	United States	Ford Field	DJ Pee .Wee; Leon Thomas	—	—
May 13	Minneapolis	United States	U.S. Bank Stadium	DJ Pee .Wee; Leon Thomas	—	—
May 16	Chicago	United States	Soldier Field	DJ Pee .Wee; Leon Thomas	—	—
May 17	Chicago	United States	Soldier Field	DJ Pee .Wee; Leon Thomas	—	—
May 20	Columbus	United States	Ohio Stadium	DJ Pee .Wee; Leon Thomas	—	—
May 24	Toronto	Canada	Rogers Stadium	DJ Pee .Wee; Leon Thomas	—	—
May 27	Toronto	Canada	Rogers Stadium	DJ Pee .Wee; Leon Thomas	—	—
May 28	Toronto	Canada	Rogers Stadium	DJ Pee .Wee; Leon Thomas	—	—
May 30	Toronto	Canada	Rogers Stadium	DJ Pee .Wee (Note: Leon Thomas was originally scheduled as one of the openers for these last two shows for Toronto, but he announced on his Instagram Stories that was sick and unable to perform for these specific tour dates.)	—	—
May 31 (Note: The show on May 31, 2026, in Toronto was originally scheduled for May 23, but was postponed due to bad weather.)	Toronto	Canada	Rogers Stadium	DJ Pee .Wee	—	—
June 18	Saint-Denis (Note: Promoted as Paris.)	France	Stade de France	DJ Pee .Wee; Victoria Monét	—	—
June 20	Saint-Denis	France	Stade de France	DJ Pee .Wee; Victoria Monét	—	—
June 21	Saint-Denis	France	Stade de France	DJ Pee .Wee; Victoria Monét	—	—
June 26	Berlin	Germany	Olympiastadion	DJ Pee .Wee; Victoria Monét	—	—
June 28	Berlin	Germany	Olympiastadion	DJ Pee .Wee; Victoria Monét	—	—
June 29	Berlin	Germany	Olympiastadion	DJ Pee .Wee; Victoria Monét	—	—
July 2	Amsterdam	Netherlands	Johan Cruyff Arena	DJ Pee .Wee; Victoria Monét	—	—
July 4	Amsterdam	Netherlands	Johan Cruyff Arena	DJ Pee .Wee; Victoria Monét	—	—
July 5	Amsterdam	Netherlands	Johan Cruyff Arena	DJ Pee .Wee; Victoria Monét	—	—
July 7	Amsterdam	Netherlands	Johan Cruyff Arena	DJ Pee .Wee; Victoria Monét	—	—
July 10	Madrid	Spain	Riyadh Air Metropolitano	DJ Pee .Wee; Victoria Monét	—	—
July 11	Madrid	Spain	Riyadh Air Metropolitano	DJ Pee .Wee; Victoria Monét	—	—
July 14	Milan	Italy	San Siro Stadium	DJ Pee .Wee; Victoria Monét	—	—
July 15	Milan	Italy	San Siro Stadium	DJ Pee .Wee; Victoria Monét	—	—
July 18	London	England	Wembley Stadium	DJ Pee .Wee; Victoria Monét	—	—
July 19	London	England	Wembley Stadium	DJ Pee .Wee; Victoria Monét	—	—
July 22	London	England	Wembley Stadium	DJ Pee .Wee; Victoria Monét	—	—
July 24	London	England	Wembley Stadium	DJ Pee .Wee; Victoria Monét	—	—
July 25	London	England	Wembley Stadium	DJ Pee .Wee; Victoria Monét	—	—
July 28	London	England	Wembley Stadium	DJ Pee .Wee; Victoria Monét	—	—
August 21	East Rutherford (Note: Promoted as New Jersey.)	United States	MetLife Stadium	DJ Pee .Wee; Raye	—	—
August 22	East Rutherford	United States	MetLife Stadium	DJ Pee .Wee; Raye	—	—
August 25	East Rutherford	United States	MetLife Stadium	DJ Pee .Wee; Raye	—	—
August 26	East Rutherford	United States	MetLife Stadium	DJ Pee .Wee; Raye	—	—
August 29	Pittsburgh	United States	Acrisure Stadium	DJ Pee .Wee (Note: Raye was originally scheduled as one of the openers for the August 29, 2026 show in Pittsburgh, but she is one of the headliners for the Reading Festival in the UK that day.)	—	—
September 1	Philadelphia	United States	Lincoln Financial Field	DJ Pee .Wee; Raye	—	—
September 2	Philadelphia	United States	Lincoln Financial Field	DJ Pee .Wee; Raye	—	—
September 5	Foxborough	United States	Gillette Stadium	DJ Pee .Wee; Raye	—	—
September 6	Foxborough	United States	Gillette Stadium	DJ Pee .Wee; Raye	—	—
September 9	Indianapolis	United States	Lucas Oil Stadium	DJ Pee .Wee; Raye	—	—
September 12	Tampa	United States	Raymond James Stadium	DJ Pee .Wee; Raye	—	—
September 13	Tampa	United States	Raymond James Stadium	DJ Pee .Wee; Raye	—	—
September 16	New Orleans	United States	Caesars Superdome	DJ Pee .Wee; Raye	—	—
September 19	Miami Gardens (Note: Promoted as Miami.)	United States	Hard Rock Stadium	DJ Pee .Wee; Raye	—	—
September 20	Miami Gardens	United States	Hard Rock Stadium	DJ Pee .Wee; Raye	—	—
September 23	San Antonio	United States	Alamodome	DJ Pee .Wee (Note: Raye was originally scheduled as one of the openers for the three shows in San Antonio and Colorado Springs, but she announced prior on her Instagram Stories that she has a clash of commitments she cannot reschedule (like the VMAs) for these tour dates.)	—	—
September 26	Colorado Springs	United States	Falcon Stadium	DJ Pee .Wee	—	—
September 27	Colorado Springs	United States	Falcon Stadium	DJ Pee .Wee	—	—
September 30	Inglewood (Note: Promoted as Los Angeles.)	United States	SoFi Stadium	DJ Pee .Wee; Raye	—	—
October 2	Inglewood	United States	SoFi Stadium	DJ Pee .Wee; Raye	—	—
October 3	Inglewood	United States	SoFi Stadium	DJ Pee .Wee; Raye	—	—
October 6	Inglewood	United States	SoFi Stadium	DJ Pee .Wee; Raye	—	—
October 7	Inglewood	United States	SoFi Stadium	DJ Pee .Wee; Raye	—	—
October 10	Santa Clara	United States	Levi's Stadium	DJ Pee .Wee; Raye	—	—
October 11	Santa Clara	United States	Levi's Stadium	DJ Pee .Wee; Raye	—	—
October 14	Vancouver	Canada	BC Place	DJ Pee .Wee; Raye	—	—
October 16	Vancouver	Canada	BC Place	DJ Pee .Wee; Raye	—	—
October 17	Vancouver	Canada	BC Place	DJ Pee .Wee; Raye	—	—
October 20	Vancouver	Canada	BC Place	DJ Pee .Wee; Raye	—	—
October 21	Vancouver	Canada	BC Place	DJ Pee .Wee; Raye	—	—
December 3	Mexico City	Mexico	Estadio GNP Seguros	DJ Pee .Wee	—	—
December 4	Mexico City	Mexico	Estadio GNP Seguros	DJ Pee .Wee	—	—
December 7	Mexico City	Mexico	Estadio GNP Seguros	DJ Pee .Wee	—	—
December 8	Mexico City	Mexico	Estadio GNP Seguros	DJ Pee .Wee	—	—
December 11	Mexico City	Mexico	Estadio GNP Seguros	DJ Pee .Wee	—	—

List of 2027 concerts, showing date, city, country, venue, opening acts, attendance, and revenue
Date (2027)	City	Country	Venue	Opening acts	Attendance	Revenue
January 4	Nagoya	Japan	Vantelin Dome Nagoya	DJ Pee .Wee	—	—
January 5	Nagoya	Japan	Vantelin Dome Nagoya	DJ Pee .Wee	—	—
January 10	Sapporo	Japan	Daiwa House Premist Dome	DJ Pee .Wee	—	—
January 11	Sapporo	Japan	Daiwa House Premist Dome	DJ Pee .Wee	—	—
January 15	Tokorozawa (Note: Promoted as Saitama.)	Japan	Belluna Dome	DJ Pee .Wee	—	—
January 16	Tokorozawa	Japan	Belluna Dome	DJ Pee .Wee	—	—
January 19	Osaka	Japan	Kyocera Dome Osaka	DJ Pee .Wee	—	—
January 20	Osaka	Japan	Kyocera Dome Osaka	DJ Pee .Wee	—	—
January 23	Fukuoka	Japan	Mizuho PayPay Dome Fukuoka	DJ Pee .Wee	—	—
January 24	Fukuoka	Japan	Mizuho PayPay Dome Fukuoka	DJ Pee .Wee	—	—
January 27	Tokyo	Japan	Tokyo Dome	DJ Pee .Wee	—	—
January 28	Tokyo	Japan	Tokyo Dome	DJ Pee .Wee	—	—
February 13	Perth	Australia	Optus Stadium	DJ Pee .Wee; Tyla	—	—
February 14	Perth	Australia	Optus Stadium	DJ Pee .Wee; Tyla	—	—
February 19	Melbourne	Australia	Marvel Stadium	DJ Pee .Wee; Tyla	—	—
February 20	Melbourne	Australia	Marvel Stadium	DJ Pee .Wee; Tyla	—	—
February 23	Melbourne	Australia	Marvel Stadium	DJ Pee .Wee; Tyla	—	—
February 24	Melbourne	Australia	Marvel Stadium	DJ Pee .Wee; Tyla	—	—
February 28	Brisbane	Australia	Suncorp Stadium	DJ Pee .Wee; Tyla	—	—
March 1	Brisbane	Australia	Suncorp Stadium	DJ Pee .Wee; Tyla	—	—
March 4	Sydney	Australia	Accor Stadium	DJ Pee .Wee; Tyla	—	—
March 5	Sydney	Australia	Accor Stadium	DJ Pee .Wee; Tyla	—	—
March 8	Sydney	Australia	Accor Stadium	DJ Pee .Wee; Tyla	—	—
March 9	Sydney	Australia	Accor Stadium	DJ Pee .Wee; Tyla	—	—
March 13	Auckland	New Zealand	Eden Park	DJ Pee .Wee; Tyla	—	—
March 14	Auckland	New Zealand	Eden Park	DJ Pee .Wee; Tyla	—	—
March 16	Auckland	New Zealand	Eden Park	DJ Pee .Wee; Tyla	—	—
April 13	Singapore		National Stadium	DJ Pee .Wee	—	—
April 14	Singapore		National Stadium	DJ Pee .Wee	—	—
April 17	Singapore		National Stadium	DJ Pee .Wee	—	—
April 18	Singapore		National Stadium	DJ Pee .Wee	—	—
April 24	Bangkok	Thailand	Rajamangala Stadium	DJ Pee .Wee	—	—
April 25	Bangkok	Thailand	Rajamangala Stadium	DJ Pee .Wee	—	—
May 1	Kaohsiung	Taiwan	Kaohsiung National Stadium	DJ Pee .Wee	—	—
May 2	Kaohsiung	Taiwan	Kaohsiung National Stadium	DJ Pee .Wee	—	—
May 7	Hong Kong		Kai Tak Stadium	DJ Pee .Wee	—	—
May 8	Hong Kong		Kai Tak Stadium	DJ Pee .Wee	—	—
May 11	Hong Kong		Kai Tak Stadium	DJ Pee .Wee	—	—
May 12	Hong Kong		Kai Tak Stadium	DJ Pee .Wee	—	—
May 15	Bocaue (Note: Promoted as Manila.)	Philippines	Philippine Arena	DJ Pee .Wee	—	—
May 16	Bocaue	Philippines	Philippine Arena	DJ Pee .Wee	—	—
May 18	Bocaue	Philippines	Philippine Arena	DJ Pee .Wee	—	—
May 21	Goyang (Note: Promoted as Seoul.)	South Korea	Goyang Stadium	DJ Pee .Wee	—	—
May 22	Goyang	South Korea	Goyang Stadium	DJ Pee .Wee	—	—
May 25	Goyang	South Korea	Goyang Stadium	DJ Pee .Wee	—	—
May 26	Goyang	South Korea	Goyang Stadium	DJ Pee .Wee	—	—
May 29	Goyang	South Korea	Goyang Stadium	DJ Pee .Wee	—	—
May 30	Goyang	South Korea	Goyang Stadium	DJ Pee .Wee	—	—

== See also ==
- List of most-attended concert tours
