= Risk It All (Bruno Mars song) =

Single by Bruno Mars

from the album The Romantic
- Released: February 27, 2026
- Genre: Bolero; Latin ballad
- Length: 3:24
- Label: Atlantic
- Songwriters: Bruno Mars; Dernst Emile II; Philip Lawrence; James Fauntleroy
- Producers: Mars; D'Mile

Bruno Mars singles chronology
"I Just Might" (2026)	"Risk It All" (2026)	"On My Soul" (2026)

Audio sample
- file; help

Music video
- "Risk It All" on YouTube

"Risk It All" is a song by Bruno Mars, released as the opening track from his 2026 album The Romantic. The song was released on February 27, 2026, via Atlantic Records as the second single from the album. "Risk It All" is a love song in which Mars states he would risk everything to be with his loved one. On May 22, 2026, "Risk It All" was released as a B-side on a 7-inch single, with its Spanish version as the A-side.

== Background and release ==
Initially conceived as an uptempo track, "Risk It All" ultimately transformed into a romantic bolero to better reflect its lyrical depth and Mars's Latin heritage.

"Risk It All" was released as a single on February 27, 2026, alongside the album. It was chosen as the second single of The Romantic. On March 3, 2026, it was reported that the song was one of the most added to contemporary hit radio stations. The song impacted Italian radio stations on April 10, 2026 via Warner Music Italy. A Spanish version, "Lo Arriesgo Todo", was released on May 8. On May 22, 2026 a 7-inch single was released by Atlantic Records. The Spanish version is the A-side and the original version is the B-side.

== Critical reception ==
Maya Geori of Rolling Stone described it as "a cinematic roar of trumpets and delicate strings". She notes, "Immediately, it evokes a Mexican bolero, which is a romantic ballad that originated in Cuba and became popularized by Mexican musicians like Agustín Lara and, later, Javier Solís." Alexis Petridis of The Guardian criticized the track as a "runny 70s MOR ballad not much perked up by the addition of mariachi horns. And even the blatant homages are not good enough to prevent you thinking you may more usefully spend your time listening to the originals". Writing for Variety, Chris Williman notes that it "really does feel like a bit of a risk, not just because it starts off the album on a slow, pleading note with acoustic guitar plucking and some of Mars' most supple vocals".

In a Riff Magazine review, Vera Maksymuik notes, "[The song] slows the tempo [of the album] without losing emotional intensity. Rich horn arrangements and mariachi-inspired instrumentation add warmth, while subtle nods to Mars' Latino heritage feel intentional." Ranking all nine tracks for Billboard, Andrew Unterberger placed the track at number five, noting that "the opener to The Romantic starts with near-mariachi trumpet and balladic strings, with Bruno Mars almost sounding like Marc Anthony as he croons over lightly brushed drums and gently plucked acoustics" and concluding by thinking that it could be a Jumbotron kiss cam highlight.

The song was nominated for Song of The Year and Best Pop Solo Performance at the 69th Annual Grammy Awards.

== Commercial performance ==
"Risk It All" debuted at number four on the US Billboard Hot 100. On its first release week, the single debuted with 23.2 million streams, and debuted at number one on Streaming Songs, where it became his fifth leader. Following the May 8 release of its Spanish version, "Risk it All" returned to the top ten of the Hot 100 at number eight, with 11.2 million streams, 38.8 million radio audience, and 2,000 sales. The song peaked at number one on the Adult R&B Songs chart. It also became Mars 12th song to reach the top spot on Radio Songs, extending his record for the most among male artists.

"Risk It All" experienced moderate success in Europe compared to the preceding "I Just Might"; it entered the top fifty on several country charts, including Denmark, Belgium, Sweden, France, Germany, Croatia and Austria.

== Music video ==
The beginning of the music video for "Risk It All" shows Mars fronting a mariachi band with Mars playing an acoustic guitar. Later on in the video, Mars is seen with DJ Rashida while they're on their honeymoon.

== Live performance ==
A live performance of "Risk It All" during The Romantic Tour was uploaded to Mars's YouTube channel on May 26, 2026. Karol G and Mars performed a Spanglish version of the song during the former's second of three headlining tour dates at the SoFi Stadium as part of her Viajando Por el Mundo Tropitour, in Los Angeles.

== Credits and personnel ==
Credits are adapted from the liner notes of The Romantic.

- Mixed at MixStar Studios, Virginia Beach
- Mastered at Sterling Sound, Edgewater, New Jersey

=== Performers ===
- Bruno Mars – vocals, producer, songwriting
- D'Mile – producer, songwriting
- Philip Lawrence – songwriting
- James Fauntleroy – songwriting
- Chris Payton – guitar
- Daniel Rodriguez – percussion, congas
- Dwayne Dugger – saxophone
- Eric Hernandez – percussion
- Jamareo Artis – bass
- John Fossitt – keyboards
- James King – trumpet
- Enrique Sanchez – trumpet
- Kameron Whalum – trumpet
- Larry Gold – conductor, string arranger
- Glenn Fischbach – cello
- Jonathan Kim – viola
- Yoshihiko Nakano – viola
- Blake Espy – violin
- Emma Kummrow – violin
- Gared Crawford – violin
- Luigi Mazzocchi – violin
- Natasha Colkett – violin
- Tess Varley – violin

=== Technical ===
- Stephen Tirpak – string arranger, copyist
- Larry Gold – strings co-arranger
- Jeff Chestek – additional engineer
- Matthew Ticcino – additional strings recording assistant
- Gabriel Roth – horns recording engineer
- Anthony Masino – horns recording engineer
- Michael Rodriguez – additional recording engineer assistant
- Charles Moniz – recording engineer
- Alex Resoagli – engineer assistance
- Bosco Mann – engineer
- Serban Ghenea – mixing
- Randy Merrill – mastering

=== Lo Arriesgo Todo ===
- Daniel Rodriguez – Spanish adaptation
- Enrique Sanchez – Spanish adaptation
- Juan Carlos Cosme – Spanish adaptation

== Charts ==
=== Weekly charts ===
List of chart positions
Chart (2026)	Peak position
Argentina Anglo Airplay (Monitor Latino)	9
Australia (ARIA)	13
Austria (Ö3 Austria Top 40)	38
Belgium (Ultratop 50 Flanders)	12
Belgium (Ultratop 50 Wallonia)	20
Bolivia Anglo Airplay (Monitor Latino)	5
Canada Hot 100 (Billboard)	9
Canada AC (Billboard)	5
Canada CHR/Top 40 (Billboard)	5
Canada Hot AC (Billboard)	3
Central America Anglo Airplay (Monitor Latino)	5
Chile Anglo Airplay (Monitor Latino)	8
Colombia Anglo Airplay (Monitor Latino)	1
Costa Rica Anglo Airplay (Monitor Latino)	5
Croatia International Airplay (Top lista)	25
Denmark (Tracklisten)	35
Dominican Republic Anglo Airplay (Monitor Latino)	8
Ecuador Anglo Airplay (Monitor Latino)	3
El Salvador Anglo Airplay (Monitor Latino)	10
France (SNEP)	42
Germany (GfK)	47
Guatemala Anglo Airplay (Monitor Latino)	3
Global 200 (Billboard)	1
Greece International (IFPI)	13
Honduras Anglo Airplay (Monitor Latino)	12
Hong Kong (Billboard)	11
Indonesia (IFPI)	2
Ireland (IRMA)	34
Israel International Airplay (Media Forest)	2
Israel TV Airplay (Media Forest)	3
Israel International TV Airplay (Media Forest)	1
Italy Airplay (EarOne)	46
Jamaica Airplay (JAMMS)	5
Japan Hot Overseas (Billboard Japan)	4
Latin America Anglo Airplay (Monitor Latino)	6
Lebanon (Lebanese Top 20)	3
Lithuania (AGATA)	58
Luxembourg (Billboard)	22
Malaysia (IFPI)	1
Malaysia International (RIM)	1
Mexico Anglo Airplay (Monitor Latino)	6
Middle East and North Africa (IFPI)	5
Netherlands (Dutch Top 40)	12
Netherlands (Single Top 100)	7
New Zealand (Recorded Music NZ)	2
Nicaragua Anglo Airplay (Monitor Latino)	2
Nigeria (TurnTable Top 100)	60
Nigeria International (TurnTable)	13
Nigeria Airplay (TurnTable)	34
North Macedonia Airplay (Radiomonitor)	5
Norway (VG-lista)	40
Panama International (PRODUCE)	22
Panama Airplay (Monitor Latino)	17
Paraguay Anglo Airplay (Monitor Latino)	10
Peru Anglo Airplay (Monitor Latino)	3
Peru Streaming (Promúsica)	13
Philippines (IFPI)	1
Philippines Hot 100 (Billboard Philippines)	1
Portugal (AFP)	11
Puerto Rico Anglo Airplay (Monitor Latino)	2
Romania Airplay (TopHit)	78
Singapore (RIAS)	1
Slovakia Singles Digital (ČNS IFPI)	50
South Korea (Circle)	172
Spain (Promusicae)	35
South Africa Airplay (TOSAC)	5
South Africa Streaming (TOSAC)	30
Suriname (Nationale Top 40)	8
Sweden (Sverigetopplistan)	56
Switzerland (Schweizer Hitparade)	17
Turkey International Airplay (Radiomonitor Türkiye)	4
United Arab Emirates (IFPI)	2
UK Singles (Official Charts)	15
Uruguay Anglo Airplay (Monitor Latino)	12
US Billboard Hot 100	4
US Adult Contemporary (Billboard)	8
US Adult Pop Airplay (Billboard)	2
US Pop Airplay (Billboard)	1
US R&B/Hip-Hop Airplay (Billboard)	12
US Rhythmic Airplay (Billboard)	2
Venezuela Anglo Airplay (Monitor Latino)	6
Vietnam Hot 100 (Billboard)	83

List of chart positions for "Lo Arriesgo Todo"
Chart (2026)	Peak position
UK Physical Singles (Official Charts)	5
US Hot Latin Songs (Billboard)	20
US Hot Latin Pop Songs (Billboard)	1
US Latin Pop Airplay (Billboard)	3

=== Monthly charts ===
List of chart positions
Chart (2026)	Peak position
Panama Streaming (PRODUCE)	60
Paraguay Airplay (SGP)	87
Romania Airplay (TopHit)	90

== Certifications ==
List of certifications
Region	Certification	Certified units/sales
Australia (ARIA)	Platinum	70,000^{‡}
Brazil (Pro-Música Brasil)	Gold	20,000^{‡}
Canada (Music Canada)	2× Platinum	160,000^{‡}
France (SNEP)	Gold	100,000^{‡}
New Zealand (RMNZ)	Platinum	30,000^{‡}
Portugal (AFP)	Platinum	25,000^{‡}
Spain (Promusicae)	Gold	50,000^{‡}
United Kingdom (BPI)	Silver	200,000^{‡}
^{‡} Sales+streaming figures based on certification alone.

== Release history ==
List of release history, showing region(s), date(s), format(s), version(s) and label(s)
Region	Date	Format(s)	Version(s)	Label	Ref.
Various	February 27, 2026	Digital download; streaming	Original	Atlantic	
Italy	April 10, 2026	Radio airplay	Original	Warner	
Various	May 8, 2026	Digital download; streaming	Spanish	Atlantic	
United States	May 22, 2026	7-inch single	Spanish; Original	Atlantic	
Various	July 31, 2026	7-inch single	Spanish; Original	Atlantic	
