= The Romantic (album) =

2026 album by Bruno Mars

Studio album by Bruno Mars
- Released: February 27, 2026
- Recorded: 2023–2025
- Studios: Shampoo Press & Curl (Los Angeles); Penrose Recorders (Riverside); Milkboy (Philadelphia)
- Genres: Retro-soul; R&B; disco; funk
- Length: 31:30
- Label: Atlantic
- Producers: Bruno Mars; D'Mile

Bruno Mars chronology
An Evening with Silk Sonic (2021)	The Romantic (2026)	Collaborations (2026)

Singles from The Romantic
- 1. "I Just Might" Released: January 9, 2026; 2. "Risk It All" Released: February 27, 2026; 3. "On My Soul" Released: June 19, 2026; 4. "Dance with Me" Released: October 1, 2026

The Romantic is the fourth solo studio album and fifth overall by the American singer-songwriter Bruno Mars, released by Atlantic Records on February 27, 2026. It marks his first album in more than four years following the collaborative album An Evening with Silk Sonic (2021) with Anderson .Paak as Silk Sonic, as well as his first solo album in over nine years since 24K Magic (2016). Mars primarily composed the album with past collaborator and An Evening with Silk Sonic producer D'Mile; other returning collaborators include Philip Lawrence, Brody Brown, and James Fauntleroy. Spanning nine tracks lasting over thirty-one minutes, it is Mars's shortest album to date, surpassing his debut solo album Doo-Wops & Hooligans (2010). It does not feature any guest appearances.

The Romantic was supported by the release of three singles: "I Just Might" on January 9, 2026, "Risk It All" on February 27, 2026, and "On My Soul" on June 19, 2026. The first debuted at the top of the US Billboard Hot 100. A concert tour in support of the album the Romantic Tour is scheduled from April to October 2026, featuring 71 shows across North America and Europe.

The Romantic received generally favorable reviews from critics, who primarily praised Mars's vocals, though some were divided on its lyricism, finding it less original than his previous work. The album debuted atop the US Billboard 200 and Top R&B/Hip-Hop Albums charts and received nominations for Album of the Year and Best Pop Vocal Album at the 2027 Grammy Awards.

== Background ==
In 2023, Mars was reportedly working on his next album with Brody Brown, Philip Lawrence and James Fauntleroy. The album was reportedly near completion that May, with a new sound and a tentative release date. Mars was in early talks with Live Nation Entertainment for a 2024–2025 tour.

In 2024, it was revealed that D'Mile was involved in the singer's follow-up album. In 2025, this information was confirmed by D'Mile. In December 2024, Mars appeared on the covers of Hits and Las Vegas Magazine. According to Hits, he was expected to release an album and tour in 2025. Ken Miller of Las Vegas Magazine said that Mars has been working on a new album since early 2023.

In 2025, Andrew Watt and Andrew Wyatt said they had worked on a song with Mars. The album was recorded at Shampoo Press & Curl studios in Los Angeles.

== Development ==
On January 5, 2026, Mars announced on his Twitter account that his album was finished. Around this time, "industry chatter" said that Mars worked with Lawrence and there were no guest appearances on the album. Two days later, on January 7, Mars announced the album title The Romantic, revealed the album cover, and that a new single would be released on Friday, January 9, 2026. It would be Mars's first album since the collaborative project, An Evening with Silk Sonic (2021) with American singer and rapper Anderson .Paak as Silk Sonic, while also being his first solo release in nearly a decade, following 24K Magic (2016). The gap in releases between 24K Magic and The Romantic makes Mars have the third-longest stretch between winning a Grammy Award (Note: 24K Magic won seven Grammy Awards, including Album of the Year.) and releasing a follow-up album, behind Robert Plant and Alison Krauss, as well as the Chicks.

On January 30, Mars was announced as the 2026 Record Store Day ambassador. He partnered with more than 200 record stores in the US to hold listening parties for The Romantic on February 25, 2026. In addition, these listening parties will also be held in different continents, including Australia, Asia, Europe and Latin America. Fans can also receive exclusive giveaways alongside a pre-order copy of the album.

== Composition ==
All the songs on the album were produced only by Mars and D'Mile. "Cha Cha Cha" is a Latin pop and disco track that features tapping drums and strings. The song borrows the Philadelphia soul rhythm of "Back Stabbers" by The O'Jays, including the pause that leads into the chorus. It interpolates "Slow Motion" (2004) by Juvenile featuring Soulja Slim on the chorus.

== Release and promotion ==
After Mars announced that his album was finished, "industry chatter" affirmed that an upcoming single would be released two days later. It was also stated that the album was supposed to be released in mid-to-late March. On January 9, 2026, "I Just Might" was released as the lead single of the album. Mars embarked on his 71-show-long fifth headlining stadium tour, The Romantic Tour. It began on April 10, 2026, in Las Vegas, and will conclude on October 14 in Vancouver.

The album was released in three different vinyl issues. One is a numbered "first pressing edition" vinyl; a second is a webstore exclusive with a velvet sleeve; and the third is a regular vinyl edition.

On February 16, 2026, Mars unveiled the tracklist.

Upon the release of its parent album The Romantic, "Cha Cha Cha" entered the top the top 40 of the Billboard Hot 100, Canadian Hot 100 and New Zealand.

Mars took over iHeartRadio on February 26 with a live stream on TikTok to promote The Romantic.

On June 23, 2026, it was announced that Mars would have his first performance on the yearly Japanese music program The Music Day (NTV) on July 4, this after appearing on the program in an interview with host Sho Sakurai three years before. It was also announced that Mars would hold one of the largest dome tours in Japan in 2027, with 12 concerts in 6 domes, starting at Vantelin Dome Nagoya in Aichi on January 4.

== Critical reception ==
The Romantic ratings
Aggregate scores
Source	Rating
AnyDecentMusic?	6.0/10
Metacritic	66/100
Review scores
Source	Rating
AllMusic	4/5 stars
Consequence	C+
The Guardian	2/5 stars
NME	4/5 stars
Paste	D+
Pitchfork	5.8/10
PopMatters	7/10
Rolling Stone	4/5 stars
Slant Magazine	3/5 stars

According to the review aggregator Metacritic, The Romantic received "generally favorable reviews" based on a weighted average score of 66 out of 100 from 10 critic scores. Aggregator AnyDecentMusic? gave The Romantic 6.0 out of 10, based on their assessment of the critical consensus.

AllMusic's Andy Kellman gave The Romantic 4 out of 5 stars, describing it as "a well-dressed set of nine finely crafted love songs". Andrew Unterberger of Billboard called the album Mars' "most straightforward throwback yet", noting that despite its concise tracklist after a decade-long hiatus, Mars was "intent on making them count". Nick Levine of NME gave the record four stars, calling it a "laser-focused collection" that positions Mars as a "silver-tongued loverman"; though he noted the singer favors "romantic clichés" over soul-baring lyrics, he praised the "fantastic" production and Mars's "terrific, raspy voice". Maura Johnston of Rolling Stone gave the album four stars, describing it as an "undeniable" crowd-pleaser that successfully blends 1970s soul with "brown-eyed soul" influences, while praising Mars's "impeccably rendered" old-school production and emotional commitment.

Paolo Ragusa of Consequence praised the album's "gorgeous instrumentation" and vocal performances, but felt the project lacked perspective and "specificity", concluding that Mars remains a "talented preservationist rather than a pioneer". Slant Magazine's Sal Cinquemani gave the album three out of five stars, praising its "mercifully succinct" production and nostalgic charm, though he criticized the reliance on lyrical clichés and felt the record "ultimately comes up a little short" after a decade-long wait. Alexis Petridis of The Guardian gave the album two stars, dismissing it as "fundamentally lazy songwriting." While praising Mars's vocals, he argued the record relies on "blatant homages" to 20th-century classics rather than offering new ideas. Writing for Pitchfork, Brittany Spanos gave the album a 5.8 out of 10, noting that while Mars remains a "charismatic performer" with a "naturally talented" voice, the record "never really delivers the romance" even when it finds its groove. Sam Rosenberg of Paste dismissed the album as "uninspired" and a "glaring self-parody," comparing its derivative nature to AI-generated music. He criticized the record's "retro-fetishistic pastiche" and argued that Mars's reliance on nostalgia had lost its "luster".

== Commercial performance ==
The Romantic debuted at number one on the Billboard 200 with first-week sales of 186,000 equivalent album units, which includes 93,500 in pure album sales (it debuts at number one on Top Album Sales), 90,500 streaming units (equaling 93.95 million on-demand official streams of the set's nine songs, Mars' best streaming week for an album; it debuts at number one on Top Streaming Albums) and 2,000 in track-equivalent album units. It became Mars's first number-one debut and second number-one album on the chart in his career in the United States. After the first week, all the songs from the album were listed on the Billboard Hot 100, with "I Just Might" returning to number one for a third week and "Risk It All" debuting at number four. In its second week, The Romantic fell a spot to number two on the Billboard 200 (displaced from the top by Harry Styles' album Kiss All the Time. Disco, Occasionally) with 80,000 equivalent album units earned. The album remained in the top ten for the next three weeks. It returned to the top ten on April 12, 2026, moving 37,000 copies.

In the United Kingdom The Romantic debuted at number three on the Official Albums Chart, under Gorillaz's chart topper album The Mountain and Olivia Dean's The Art of Loving, becoming Mars' fifth top-ten album on the chart. In Australia the album debuted at number two on the ARIA Albums Chart, behind Olivia Dean's The Art of Loving, becoming Mars' fifth top-ten album on the chart and his best chart position in its first week of sales since Unorthodox Jukebox in 2012.

== Track listing ==
All tracks are produced by Bruno Mars and D'Mile.

The Romantic track listing
No.	Title	Writer(s)	Length
1.	"Risk It All"	Mars; Dernst Emile II; Philip Lawrence; James Fauntleroy	3:24
2.	"Cha Cha Cha"	Mars; Emile; Lawrence; Brody Brown; Fauntleroy; Terius Gray	3:56
3.	"I Just Might"	Mars; Emile; Lawrence; Brown	3:32
4.	"God Was Showing Off"	Mars; Emile; Lawrence; Fauntleroy; Homer Steinweiss; Leon Michels; Dave Guy	3:31
5.	"Why You Wanna Fight?"	Mars; Emile; Brown	4:14
6.	"On My Soul"	Mars; Emile; Lawrence; Fauntleroy	2:54
7.	"Something Serious"	Mars; Emile	2:46
8.	"Nothing Left"	Mars; Emile	3:34
9.	"Dance with Me"	Mars; Emile; Fauntleroy	3:39
Total length:			31:30

Notes

- "Cha Cha Cha" contains an interpolation of "Slow Motion", written by Terius Gray and James Tapp Jr., and performed by Juvenile featuring Soulja Slim.

== Personnel ==
Credits adapted from Tidal.

=== Musicians ===
- Bruno Mars – vocals (all tracks), percussion (tracks 4, 6, 8, 9)
- Daniel Rodriguez – congas, percussion
- Chris Payton – guitar (all tracks), background vocals (7)
- John Fossitt – keyboards
- Jamareo Artis – bass
- Eric Hernandez – percussion (1–3, 5), drums (4, 6–9)
- Dwayne Dugger – saxophone (1–4, 6, 7)
- Enrique Sanchez – trumpet (1–4, 6, 7)
- Jimmy King – trumpet (1–4, 6, 7)
- Kameron Whalum – trumpet (1), trombone (2–4, 6, 7)
- Larry Gold – conducting, string arrangement (1, 2, 4–6, 9)
- Steven Tirpak – arrangement (1, 2, 4–6, 9)
- Blake Epsy – violin (1, 2, 4–6, 9)
- Emma Kummrow – violin (1, 2, 4–6, 9)
- Gared Crawford – violin (1, 2, 4–6, 9)
- Luigi Mazzocchi – violin (1, 2, 4–6, 9)
- Natasha Colkett – violin (1, 2, 4–6, 9)
- Tess Varley – violin (1, 2, 4–6, 9)
- Glenn Fischbach – cello (1, 2, 4–6, 9)
- Jonathan Kim – viola (1, 2, 4–6, 9)
- Yoshihiko Nakano – viola (1, 2, 4–6, 9)
- James Fauntleroy – background vocals (2)
- Philip Lawrence – background vocals (2)
- Charles Moniz – claps (2–4, 6–9)
- Carlin White – drums (2, 3, 5, 7)
- D'Mile – background vocals (7)

=== Technical ===
- Bruno Mars – production
- D'Mile – production
- Charles Moniz – recording (all tracks), engineering (1, 2, 4–9)
- Anthony Masino – recording, engineering (1, 4, 9); horns engineering (2, 3, 6, 7)
- Gabriel Roth – recording, engineering (1, 4, 9); horns engineering (2, 3, 6, 7)
- Bryce Bordone – engineering
- Jeff Chestek – additional engineering (1), strings engineering (4–6, 9)
- Alex Resoagli – engineering assistance (1, 2, 4–9)
- Michael Rodriguez – engineering assistance (1–4, 6, 7, 9)
- Matthew Ticcino – engineering assistance (1, 5, 9), strings engineering assistance (4, 6)
- Serban Ghenea – mixing
- Randy Merrill – mastering

== Charts ==
=== Weekly charts ===
List of chart positions
Chart (2026)	Peak position
Australian Albums (ARIA)	2
Austrian Albums (Ö3 Austria)	3
Belgian Albums (Ultratop Flanders)	2
Belgian Albums (Ultratop Wallonia)	3
Canadian Albums (Billboard)	1
Croatian International Albums (HDU)	1
Czech Albums (ČNS IFPI)	31
Danish Albums (Hitlisten)	3
Dutch Albums (Album Top 100)	2
Finnish Albums (Suomen virallinen lista)	11
French Albums (SNEP)	3
German Albums (Offizielle Top 100)	3
Greek Albums (IFPI)	8
Hungarian Albums (MAHASZ)	3
Irish Albums (Official Charts)	7
Italian Albums (FIMI)	9
Japanese Albums (Oricon)	9
Japanese Combined Albums (Oricon)	10
Japanese Hot Albums (Billboard Japan)	8
Lithuanian Albums (AGATA)	11
New Zealand Albums (RMNZ)	2
Norwegian Albums (IFPI Norge)	4
Polish Albums (ZPAV)	5
Portuguese Albums (AFP)	2
Scottish Albums (Official Charts)	3
Slovak Albums (ČNS IFPI)	13
Spanish Albums (Promusicae)	3
Swedish Albums (Sverigetopplistan)	5
Swiss Albums (Schweizer Hitparade)	3
UK Albums (Official Charts)	3
US Billboard 200	1
US Top R&B/Hip-Hop Albums (Billboard)	1

=== Monthly charts ===
List of chart position
Chart (2026)	Position
Japanese Albums (Oricon)	29

== Certifications ==
List of certifications
Region	Certification	Certified units/sales
Canada (Music Canada)	Platinum	80,000^{‡}
France (SNEP)	Gold	50,000^{‡}
New Zealand (RMNZ)	Gold	7,500^{‡}
Spain (Promusicae)	Gold	20,000^{‡}
United Kingdom (BPI)	Silver	60,000^{‡}
^{‡} Sales+streaming figures based on certification alone.
