= That's Why I Love You =

Single by Victoria Monét featuring Bruno Mars

from the album Frequency of Love
- Language: English
- Released: October 15, 2026
- Length: 4:38
- Label: Lovett Music; RCA
- Songwriters: Monét; Bruno Mars; Bruno Lauzi; Darhyl Camper; Dernst Emile II; Solána Rowe
- Producers: Camper; D'Mile; Debose

Victoria Monét singles chronology
"See You in My Dreams" (2026)	"That's Why I Love You" (2026)

Bruno Mars singles chronology
"Dance with Me" (2026)	"That's Why I Love You" (2026)

"That's Why I Love You" is a song by American singer-songwriter Victoria Monét, which features American singer-songwriter Bruno Mars, from her second studio album, Frequency of Love (2026). Monét, Mars, Bruno Lauzi, Darhyl Camper, Dernst Emile II and Solána Rowe shared writing credits. Camper, D'Mile and Debose produced the track.

== Composition and release ==
"That's Why I Love You" was written by Victoria Monét, Bruno Mars, Bruno Lauzi, Darhyl Camper, Dernst Emile II and Solána Rowe. Camper, D'Mile and Debose produced the track. Mars, D'Mile, Larry Gold and Peter Lee Johnson were responsible for the song's arrangement. Monét, Luca Zadra and Noe Corona acted as recording engineers. "That's Why I Love You" was mixed by Manny Marroquin and mastered by Zach Pereya. It samples Bruno Lauzi's Ritornerai.

"That's Why I Love You" was initially released on October 2, 2026, alongside Frequency of Love. It was chosen as the fifth single of the album in Italy. The song impacted Italian radio stations on October 15, 2026, via Sony Records.

== Charts ==
List of chart positions
Chart (2026)	Peak position
New Zealand Hot Singles (RMNZ)	26

== Release history ==
List of release history, showing region(s), date(s), format(s) and label(s)
Region	Date	Format(s)	Label(s)	Ref.
Various	October 15, 2026	Radio airplay	Sony	
