= On My Soul =

Single by Bruno Mars

from the album The Romantic
- Released: June 19, 2026
- Genre: Pop soul
- Length: 2:54
- Label: Atlantic
- Songwriters: Bruno Mars; Dernst Emile II; Philip Lawrence; James Fauntleroy
- Producers: Mars; D'Mile

Bruno Mars singles chronology
"Risk It All" (2026)	"On My Soul" (2026)	"Still" (2026)

"On My Soul" is a song by Bruno Mars, released as the sixth track from his 2026 album The Romantic. The song was released on June 19, 2026 via Warner Music Group as the third single from the album in Italy and the Netherlands. The track was written by Mars, Dernst Emile II, Philip Lawrence and James Fauntleroy. It was produced by the former two.

== Release ==
"On My Soul" was initially released on February 27, 2026, alongside The Romantic. It was chosen as the third single of the album in Italy and the Netherlands. The song impacted both Italian and Dutch radio stations on June 19, 2026 via Warner Music Group.

== Critical reception ==
Ranking all nine tracks for Billboard, Andrew Unterberger placed the track at number four, defining the song as Mars' version of the song "Move On Up" by Curtis Mayfield, writing that "Mars is expert tributist enough that he nails the details, without being so heavy-handed with it that you feel like you’re listening to a not-so-thinly-disguised cover".

== Commercial performance ==
Following the release of The Romantic in 2026, "On My Soul" debuted at number 43 on the US Billboard Hot 100, becoming the seventh highest charting track from the album. That same week, the track peaked at number 12 on the Billboard Hot R&B/Hip-Hop Songs. In Canada, "On My Soul" peaked at number 46 on the Canadian Hot 100.

== Credits and personnel ==
Credits are adapted from the liner notes of The Romantic.

- Mixed at MixStar Studios, Virginia Beach
- Mastered at Sterling Sound, Edgewater, New Jersey

=== Performers ===
- Bruno Mars – vocals, producer, songwriting, percussion
- D'Mile – producer, songwriting
- Philip Lawrence – songwriting
- James Fauntleroy – songwriting
- Chris Payton – guitar
- Daniel Rodriguez – percussion, congas
- Dwayne Dugger – saxophone
- Eric Hernandez – drums
- Jamareo Artis – bass
- John Fossitt – keyboards
- James King – trumpet
- Enrique Sanchez – trumpet
- Kameron Whalum – trombone
- Larry Gold – conductor
- Steven Tirpak – arranger
- Blake Epsy – violin
- Emma Kummrow – violin
- Gared Crawford – violin
- Luigi Mazzocchi – violin
- Natasha Colkett – violin
- Tess Varley – violin
- Glenn Fischbach – cello
- Jonathan Kim – viola
- Yoshihiko Nakano – viola
- Charles Moniz – claps

=== Technical ===
- Larry Gold – conductor
- Stephen Tirpak – strings arranger, copyist
- Charles Moniz – recording engineer
- Alex Resoagli – engineer assistant
- Michael Rodriguez – engineer assistant
- Anthony Masino – horns engineer
- Gabriel Roth – horns engineer
- Jeff Chestek – strings recording engineer
- Matthew Ticcino – strings engineer assistant
- Bryce Bordone – engineer
- Serban Ghenea – mixing
- Randy Merrill – mastering

== Charts ==
=== Weekly charts ===
Weekly chart performance
Chart (2026)	Peak position
Australia Airplay (RCS)	4
Belgium (Ultratop 50 Flanders)	4
Belgium (Ultratop 50 Wallonia)	18
Canada Hot 100 (Billboard)	46
Croatia International Airplay (Top lista)	56
Czech Republic Airplay (ČNS IFPI)	3
France Airplay (SNEP)	26
Global 200 (Billboard)	57
Italy Airplay (EarOne)	12
Latvia Airplay (TopHit)	14
Lithuania Airplay (TopHit)	23
Netherlands (Dutch Top 40)	11
Netherlands (Single Top 100)	50
New Zealand Airplay (RCS)	19
North Macedonia Airplay (Radiomonitor)	14
Portugal (AFP)	182
San Marino Airplay (SMRTV Top 50)	10
Suriname (Nationale Top 40)	2
Switzerland Airplay (MusicTrace)	20
US Billboard Hot 100	43
US Hot R&B/Hip-Hop Songs (Billboard)	12

=== Monthly charts ===
Monthly chart performance
Chart (2026)	Peak position
Lithuania Airplay (TopHit)	31

== Release history ==
List of release history, showing region(s), date(s), format(s) and label(s)
Region	Date	Format(s)	Label(s)	Ref.
Italy	June 19, 2026	Radio airplay	Warner	
Netherlands	June 19, 2026	Radio airplay	Warner	
