= Austin Millz =

American DJ & producer (born 1988)

- Born: Austin Christoper Millz; October 30, 1988 (age 37); Harlem, New York, U.S.
- Genre: Electronic Dance Music
- Occupations: DJ; producer; songwriter
- Years active: 2013– Present
- Labels: Ultra Records, LLC
- Website: austinmillz.live

Austin Christopher Miller, known professionally as Austin Millz is an American DJ, producer, and songwriter. He is best known for his remix, “Feeling Good - Austin Millz Remix” and his single “Bad Behavior” which features Remi Wolf. His 2023 EP, "breathwork’ collaborates with Alina Baraz, Sabrina Claudio, and Justine Skye.

== Early life ==
Millz was born and raised in Harlem, New York. He is of Puerto Rican descent.

== Musical career ==
Millz discovering his love for music while in high school. He played a lot of video games until he found the music software FruityLoops and started creating samples and beats. By 2016, he was in the DJ Booth performing all over New York. Eventually, he DJ’d Beyonce’s Homecoming Coachella performances and made his debut for Boiler Room NYC in 2023.

In 2018, Millz was nominated at the Global Spin Awards for Breakthrough DJ of the Year, Regional Club DJ of the Year (Northeast), and Regional Open Format Club DJ of the Year (Northeast).

In 2023, Millz collaborated on the single Freeway with Estelle. In 2024, Austin embarked on the "Fresh Air Tour," which included performances across Europe and North America.

== Discography ==
=== Projects ===
Year	Title	Type
October 1, 2021	Midas	EP
June 16, 2023	Breathwork	EP

=== Singles ===
Year	Title	Type
July 22, 2016	Limelite (feat Anishka)	Single
February 17, 2017	Cyclone (feat Tunji Ige)	Single
February 17, 2017	New Ting (feat Ye Ali)	Single
February 17, 2017	Touch (feat Sessi)	Single
September 28, 2017	Touch - Essentrik Remix (feat Esentrik)	Remix
September 28, 2017	New Ting - Brenmar Remix (feat Brenmar)	Remix
September 28, 2017	Cyclone B. Lewis Remix (feat B. Lewis)	Remix
September 28, 2017	New Ting - Juelz Remix (feat B. Juelz)	Remix
September 28, 2017	New Ting - Dabow Remix (feat B. Juelz)	Remix
March 22, 2019	Broke Boy (feat Claire Ridgely)	Single
November 14, 2019	Bad Behavior (feat Remi Wolf)	Single
March 19, 2020	On Read (feat Pell)	Single
December 9, 2020	Feels Good (feat Teedra Moses)	Single
August 28, 2020	Inside Out (feat Grouplove)	Remix
October 29, 2020	Unbound (feat MICHELLE)	Remix
June 23, 2021	Ride (feat Ori Rose)	Single
September 10, 2021	Gold (feat Aluna)	Single
May 5, 2022	What's Next (feat Pell)	Single
January 1, 2022	Always Be My Baby	Remix
July 29, 2022	Tukuntazo (feat El Cherry Scom)	Remix
October 7, 2022	Feeling Good (feat Nina Simone)	Remix
January 27, 2023	Nobody Khan (feat Chaka Khan)	Single
March 3, 2023	Inhale/Exhale (feat Sabrina Claudio)	Single
April 7, 2023	Freeway (feat Estelle)	Single
May 19, 2023	Breathless (feat Alina Baraz)	Single
June 1, 2023	Lovely Day (feat Bill Withers)	Single
August 8, 2024	TURBINA (with Farruko)	Single
November 1, 2024	Need I Say More (feat Jozzy)	Single
January 31, 2025	Hot & Mysterious (feat Kah-Lo)	Single
April 18, 2025	Sweat (feat SKILAH)	Single
February 13, 2026	I Just Might (feat Bruno Mars)	Remix
