= Dance with Me (Bruno Mars song) =

Single by Bruno Mars

from the album The Romantic
- Released: October 1, 2026
- Length: 3:39
- Label: Atlantic
- Songwriters: Bruno Mars; Dernst Emile II; James Fauntleroy
- Producers: Mars; D'Mile

Bruno Mars singles chronology
"Still" (2026)	"Dance with Me" (2026)	"That's Why I Love You" (2026)

Music video
- "Dance with Me" on YouTube

"Dance with Me" is a song by Bruno Mars, released as the ninth and final track from his 2026 album The Romantic. The song was released on October 1, 2026 via Atlantic Records as the fourth single from the album. The track was written by Mars, Dernst Emile II and James Fauntleroy. It was produced by the former two.

== Release ==
"Dance with Me" was released as a single on October 1, 2026, with a new cover in various digital services, by Atlantic Records. This was also confirmed by Rolling Stone and Complex. A Limited-Edition "Dance With Me" vinyl will be released on January 15, 2027.

== Music video ==
The music video is Karol G's second visual collaboration with Mars following their "Still" video. The music video opens with Mars alone inside a telephone booth, setting up the song's old-fashioned romantic mood before he calls Karol G and begins singing to her. The visual changes from intimate to almost fairytale-like, with Mars serenading Karol beneath her balcony, accompanied by a full band.

== Live performances ==
A video of his "Dance With Me" performance was premiered at the 2026 MTV Video Music Awards.

== Credits and personnel ==
Credits are adapted from the liner notes of The Romantic.

- Mixed at MixStar Studios, Virginia Beach
- Mastered at Sterling Sound, Edgewater, New Jersey

=== Performers ===
- Bruno Mars – vocals, producer, songwriting, percusion
- D'Mile – producer, songwriting
- James Fauntleroy – songwriting
- Chris Payton – guitar
- Eric Hernandez – drums
- Larry Gold – conductor, string arranger
- Glenn Fischbach – cello
- Jonathan Kim – viola
- Yoshihiko Nakano – viola
- Blake Espy – violin
- Emma Kummrow – violin
- Gared Crawford – violin
- Luigi Mazzocchi – violin
- Natasha Colkett – violin
- Tess Varley – violin

=== Technical ===
- Stephen Tirpak – string arranger, copyist
- Jeff Chestek – additional engineer
- Matthew Ticcino – additional strings recording assistant
- Gabriel Roth – horns recording engineer
- Anthony Masino – horns recording engineer
- Michael Rodriguez – additional recording engineer assistant
- Charles Moniz – recording engineer, engineer, claps
- Alex Resoagli – engineer assistance
- Bosco Mann – engineer
- Serban Ghenea – mixing
- Randy Merrill – mastering

== Charts ==
Weekly chart performance
Chart (2026)	Peak position
Argentina Anglo Airplay (Monitor Latino)	14
Bolivia Anglo Airplay (Monitor Latino)	9
Canada Hot 100 (Billboard)	42
Chile Anglo Airplay (Monitor Latino)	9
Netherlands (Single Tip)	13
Portugal (AFP)	177
US Billboard Hot 100	42
US Adult Contemporary (Billboard)	26
US Adult Pop Airplay (Billboard)	20
US Pop Airplay (Billboard)	26
US Rhythmic Airplay (Billboard)	15

== Certifications ==
List of certifications
Region	Certification	Certified units/sales
Canada (Music Canada)	Gold	40,000^{‡}
^{‡} Sales+streaming figures based on certification alone.

== Release history ==
List of release history, showing region(s), date(s), format(s) and label(s)
Region	Date	Format(s)	Label(s)	Ref.
Various	October 1, 2026	Digital download; streaming	Atlantic	
United States	October 5, 2026	Contemporary hit radio	Atlantic	
United States	October 6, 2026	Rhythmic contemporary	Atlantic	
Italy	November 6, 2026	Radio airplay	Warner	
Various	January 15, 2027	7-inch single	Atlantic	
