= Forever Valentine (song) =

Single by Charlie Wilson
- Released: January 17, 2020
- Genre: R&B
- Length: 3:58
- Label: P Music Group
- Songwriters: Charlie Wilson; Bruno Mars; Johnathan Yip; Ray Romulus; Jeremy Reeves; Ray McCullough II; Micah Powell; Seth Reger
- Producers: Mars; The Stereotypes; D'Mile

Charlie Wilson singles chronology
"Chills" (2017)	"Forever Valentine" (2020)	"One I Got" (2020)

"Forever Valentine" is a song by American R&B singer Charlie Wilson, released on January 17, 2020. The song was produced by Bruno Mars, the Stereotypes and D'Mile. They also co-wrote the song along with Charlie Wilson, Micah Powell and Seth Reger. The background vocals feature Mars, Wilson and James Fauntleroy, along with others.

== Background ==
On July 27, 2018, Wilson stated that he and Mars were working on a collaboration. Wilson said that he was having fun with the song, the result of his and Mars' "creative combustion". They started talking about the song's vibe and recorded a chorus for it, but they didn't met each other for some time afterwards due to their busy schedules. Nevertheless, after Wilson performed on selected dates of Mars' third worldwide tour, the 24K Magic World Tour, they would "sing every day at lunch time as we further hashed out the song". It was released on Urban AC on January 17, 2020. On January 23, 2020, it was sent to AC, Hot AC, Top 40 and Urban radio stations.

== Composition ==
Rolling Stone reviewer Jon Blistein described Wilson's performance as "vintage, belting and crooning sweet and delightfully over-the-top over a thumping funk groove".

== Credits and personnel ==
=== Personnel ===
- Charlie Wilson – songwriting
- Bruno Mars – producer, songwriting, background vocals
- The Stereotypes – producer, songwriting, programmer
- D'Mile – producer, songwriting, bass, strings, background vocals
- Micah Powell – songwriting, background vocals
- Seth Reger – songwriting
- Bianca Atterberry – background vocals
- Destiny Rogers – background vocals
- James Fauntleroy – background vocals
- Jonathan Yip – background vocals, keyboards
- Jeremy Reeves – percussion
- Ray McCullough II – horn
- Ray Romulus – drums
- Stevo Evans – additional keyboards, programmer
- Dave Forman – guitar
- Charles Moniz – guitar, engineer
- Ronald Estrada – engineer
- Gene Grimaldi – engineer
- Kevin Davis – engineer

Credits:

== Charts ==
Chart (2020–2021)	Peak position
US Adult Contemporary (Billboard)	18
US Adult R&B Songs (Billboard)	1
US R&B/Hip-Hop Airplay (Billboard)	19
