= I Just Might =

- Physical and Austin Millz remix digital cover

Single by Bruno Mars

from the album The Romantic
- Released: January 9, 2026
- Genre: Disco-pop; pop-soul; funk
- Length: 3:33
- Label: Atlantic
- Songwriters: Bruno Mars; Dernst Emile II; Philip Lawrence; Brody Brown
- Producers: Mars; D'Mile

Bruno Mars singles chronology
"Bonde do Brunão" (2025)	"I Just Might" (2026)	"Risk It All" (2026)

Music video
- "I Just Might" on YouTube

"I Just Might" is a song by the American singer-songwriter Bruno Mars. It was released on January 9, 2026, through Atlantic Records, as the lead single from his fourth solo studio album The Romantic, that was released on February 27, 2026. A disco-pop, pop-soul, and funk song, "I Just Might" was written by Mars, Dernst "D'Mile" Emile II, Philip Lawrence and Christopher "Brody" Brown, and produced by the former two. It reached number one in 18 countries, and the top ten in over 25 other countries.

== Background and release ==
Following various single releases with collaborators – including Lady Gaga ("Die with a Smile"), Rosé ("APT."), and Sexyy Red ("Fat Juicy & Wet") – between 2024 and 2025, Mars began teasing new solo material in late 2025. His fourth studio album, The Romantic, was officially announced on January 7, 2026, alongside the announcement of new music scheduled for that Friday. The name of the lead single, "I Just Might", was only revealed once it was made available for digital download and streaming services on January 9. Accompanying the release, Mars stated on social media that the song signaled that the "self-proclaimed Aura Lord is back" and that it heralded "party time".

== Composition ==
"I Just Might" is a mid-tempo, retro-styled disco-pop, pop-soul, and funk song. Some publications only noticed a funk influence. It sees Mars operating "within his wheelhouse", incorporating "old-school soul" alongside "bright guitar licks, a buzzy bassline, and lots of brass". The song has been compared to Leo Sayer's 1976 hit disco song "You Make Me Feel Like Dancing", while the vocal refrain in the song's chorus has been compared to Junior Senior's 2002 single "Move Your Feet".

== Reception ==
=== Critical ===
Writing for Pitchfork, Nina Corcoran wrote that Mars "delivers the type of chart-topping boogie that's quintessentially him". Slant Magazine's Alexa Camp described the song as a return to Bruno Mars's signature style, highlighting its old-school soul feel, bright guitar licks, and brassy, midtempo groove. Pavel Snapkou of Showbiz by PS noted that while the single draws heavily on familiar elements from Mars's past eras, it remains smooth, catchy, and radio-friendly, lyrically inept, even if it does not radically reinvent his sound.

=== Commercial ===
"I Just Might" received 13.73 million on-demand streams in the United States during its first four days of availability. "I Just Might" debuted at number one on the US Billboard Hot 100, becoming his first song to do so. On its first release week, the single debuted with 23.5 million streams, 32.6 million radio airplay, and sold 13,000 copies in the United States. It became Mars's fourth number one on the Streaming Songs chart and twelfth number one on Digital Song Sales and the singer's personal best on Radio Songs (number 12) and the highest start for a lead male artist since the charts' inception in 1998. The song also became its fifth number one on Hot R&B/Hip-Hop Songs. He also tied Drake, Michael Jackson, and Stevie Wonder as the only solo male with 10 or more number-one songs on the Billboard Hot 100. Mars is also one of the artists with the most cumulative weeks at number one, with 40. "I Just Might" spent a second week on the top of the Billboard Hot 100. The single had 17.1 million streams, 40.8 million radio airplay, and sold 9,000 copies in the United States. The song reached the top ten of Radio Songs, entering at number nine, becoming Mars's 21st top 10; and a second week as the most sold track on Digital Song Sales. Mars topped the Hot 100 for at least two weeks with eight of his 10 career number one songs. He becomes the best among males and ties Janet Jackson for second-best, after Mariah Carey's. "I Just Might" rose to number one on the Hot 100 once again in March for a third week, with 18 million streams, 72.5 million radio airplay, and 6,000 copies sold in the United States.

In the United States, Mars's catalog (except "I Just Might") received a 75 percent rise when compared to the previous week, as it was streamed 50.87 million times during the first four days of the aforementioned single availability. When the track topped the Billboard Radio Songs chart, it became Mars's eleventh number-one on the chart, tying with Mariah Carey. At the time, Rihanna led the list with 13 songs. When "I Just Might" topped the Billboard's Pop Airplay, Mars became the first male act to have twelve number one songs on the aforementioned chart. The track has spent 21 weeks on the top of Radio Songs, a record for Mars. Mars topped both the Hot R&B/Hip-Hop Songs for 36 weeks and the Hot R&B Songs for 43 weeks. He extended his longest career top on both charts and became the longest command on the Hot R&B/Hip-Hop Songs and the second-longest command on the Hot R&B Songs.

=== Accolades ===
"I Just Might" won Song of the Summer at the 2026 iHeartRadio Music Awards. At the 2026 American Music Awards it won 'Best R&B Song'. At the 2026 MTV Video Music Awards it won Best R&B, it was also nominated for; Video Of The Year, Best Direction and Best Editing. At the 2026 Soul Train Music Awards it was nominated for R&B/Soul Song of The Year. The song was nominated for Record of The Year, while its Austin Millz version was nominated for Best Remixed Recording at the 69th Annual Grammy Awards.

The song is also CPR-approved by the American Heart Association by having a right tempo for hands-only CPR with 103 beats per minute.

== Music video ==
The official music video for "I Just Might" was released alongside the single on January 9, 2026. Directed by Daniel Ramos and Mars, it features Mars dressed in a green suit as he leads a group of different versions of himself. The group is shown performing the song on a "retro, 1970s-inspired soundstage". Critics have compared the video to that of Outkast's "Hey Ya!", which itself was inspired by other one-man band music videos such as Paul McCartney's "Coming Up" and Phil Collins' "Two Hearts".

== Live performances ==
Mars performed the song for the first time during the 68th Annual Grammy Awards on February 1, 2026.

== Personnel ==
Credits adapted from Tidal.

- Bruno Mars – vocals, songwriting, production
- D'Mile – songwriting, production
- Philip Lawrence – songwriting
- Brody Brown – songwriting
- Carlin White – drums
- Chris Payton – guitar
- Daniel Rodriguez – congas
- Dwane Dugger – saxophone
- Enrique Sanchez – trumpet
- Eric "E-Panda" Hernandez – percussion
- Jamareo Artis – bass
- James King – trumpet
- John Fossit – keyboards
- Kameron Whalum – trombone
- Charles Moniz – handclaps, recording engineer
- Alex Resoagli – engineering assistant
- Michael Rodriguez – additional recording engineer assistant
- Anthony Masino – horns engineering
- Gabriel Roth – horns engineering
- Bryce Bordone – engineer
- Serban Ghenea – mixing
- Randy Merrill – mastering

== Charts ==
=== Weekly charts ===
List of chart positions
Chart (2026)	Peak position
Argentina Hot 100 (Billboard)	16
Argentina Airplay (Monitor Latino)	2
Australia (ARIA)	8
Austria (Ö3 Austria Top 40)	11
Belarus Airplay (TopHit)	30
Belgium (Ultratop 50 Flanders)	1
Belgium (Ultratop 50 Wallonia)	1
Bolivia Airplay (Monitor Latino)	5
Brazil Hot 100 (Billboard)	92
Bulgaria Airplay (PROPHON)	1
Canada Hot 100 (Billboard)	1
Canada AC (Billboard)	1
Canada CHR/Top 40 (Billboard)	1
Canada Hot AC (Billboard)	1
Canada Modern Rock (Billboard Canada)	33
Central America Airplay (Monitor Latino)	11
Central America + Caribbean Airplay (BMAT)	3
Chile Airplay (Monitor Latino)	1
Colombia Airplay (National-Report)	14
CIS Airplay (TopHit)	1
Costa Rica Airplay (FONOTICA)	1
Croatia International Airplay (Top lista)	1
Czech Republic Airplay (ČNS IFPI)	2
Denmark (Tracklisten)	8
Dominican Republic Anglo Airplay (Monitor Latino)	2
Ecuador Airplay (Monitor Latino)	13
El Salvador Airplay (ASAP EGC)	5
Estonia Airplay (TopHit)	1
Finland Airplay (Radiosoittolista)	15
France (SNEP)	20
Germany (GfK)	11
Global 200 (Billboard)	4
Greece International (IFPI)	35
Greece Airplay (IFPI)	9
Guatemala Airplay (Monitor Latino)	12
Honduras Airplay (Monitor Latino)	3
Hong Kong (Billboard)	14
Hungary (Rádiós Top 40)	27
Iceland (Billboard)	11
Ireland (IRMA)	12
Israel (Mako Hitlist)	87
Italy (FIMI)	52
Jamaica Airplay (JAMMS)	6
Japan Hot 100 (Billboard)	18
Kazakhstan Airplay (TopHit)	3
Latin America Anglo Airplay (Monitor Latino)	1
Latvia Airplay (LaIPA)	1
Lebanon (Lebanese Top 20)	4
Lithuania (AGATA)	51
Lithuania Airplay (TopHit)	1
Lithuania Airplay (TopHit) Austin Millz remix	77
Luxembourg (Billboard)	14
Malaysia (Billboard)	14
Malaysia International (RIM)	12
Malta Airplay (Radiomonitor)	1
Mexico Airplay (Monitor Latino)	7
Moldova Airplay (TopHit)	40
Netherlands (Dutch Top 40)	1
Netherlands (Single Top 100)	1
New Zealand (Recorded Music NZ)	3
Nicaragua Anglo Airplay (Monitor Latino)	2
Nigeria (TurnTable Top 100)	34
North Macedonia Airplay (Radiomonitor)	1
Norway (VG-lista)	9
Panama International (PRODUCE)	6
Panama Airplay (Monitor Latino)	3
Paraguay Airplay (Monitor Latino)	1
Peru (Billboard)	25
Peru Airplay (Monitor Latino)	4
Philippines Hot 100 (Billboard Philippines)	15
Poland Airplay (OLiS)	5
Poland Streaming (OLiS)	77
Portugal (AFP)	15
Puerto Rico Airplay (Monitor Latino)	15
Romania Airplay (UPFR)	5
Romania Airplay (Media Forest)	5
Romania TV Airplay (Media Forest)	16
Russia Airplay (TopHit)	9
Serbia Airplay (Radiomonitor)	1
Singapore (RIAS)	5
Slovakia Airplay (ČNS IFPI)	6
Slovakia Singles Digital (ČNS IFPI)	49
Slovenia Airplay (Radiomonitor)	1
Spain (Promusicae)	28
South Africa Airplay (TOSAC)	1
South Africa Streaming (TOSAC)	66
South Korea (Circle)	153
Suriname (Nationale Top 40)	1
Sweden (Sverigetopplistan)	13
Switzerland (Schweizer Hitparade)	12
Taiwan (Billboard)	24
Turkey International Airplay (Radiomonitor Türkiye)	7
United Arab Emirates (IFPI)	11
Ukraine Airplay (TopHit)	13
UK Singles (Official Charts)	5
Uruguay Airplay (Monitor Latino)	5
US Billboard Hot 100	1
US Adult Contemporary (Billboard)	2
US Adult Pop Airplay (Billboard)	1
US Dance Airplay (Billboard)	15
US Hot R&B/Hip-Hop Songs (Billboard)	1
US Pop Airplay (Billboard)	1
US Rhythmic Airplay (Billboard)	1
Venezuela Airplay (Record Report)	13

=== Monthly charts ===
List of chart positions
Chart (2026)	Peak position
Belarus Airplay (TopHit)	38
CIS Airplay (TopHit)	1
Estonia Airplay (TopHit)	1
Kazakhstan Airplay (TopHit)	4
Latvia Airplay (TopHit)	29
Lithuania Airplay (TopHit)	1
Moldova Airplay (TopHit)	58
Paraguay Airplay (SGP)	3
Romania Airplay (TopHit)	5
Russia Airplay (TopHit)	11
Ukraine Airplay (TopHit)	44

== Certifications ==
List of certifications
Region	Certification	Certified units/sales
Australia (ARIA)	Platinum	70,000^{‡}
Austria (IFPI Austria)	Gold	15,000^{‡}
Brazil (Pro-Música Brasil)	Platinum	40,000^{‡}
Canada (Music Canada)	3× Platinum	240,000^{‡}
Denmark (IFPI Danmark)	Gold	45,000^{‡}
France (SNEP)	Platinum	200,000^{‡}
New Zealand (RMNZ)	Platinum	30,000^{‡}
Portugal (AFP)	Platinum	25,000^{‡}
Spain (Promusicae)	Gold	50,000^{‡}
United Kingdom (BPI)	Platinum	600,000^{‡}
^{‡} Sales+streaming figures based on certification alone.

== Release history ==
List of release history showing region(s), date(s), format(s), version(s) and label(s)
Region	Date	Format(s)	Version(s)	Label	Ref.
Various	January 9, 2026	Digital download; streaming	Original	Atlantic	
Italy	January 9, 2026	Radio airplay	Original	Warner Italy	
United States	January 13, 2026	Contemporary hit radio	Original	Atlantic	
Various	February 13, 2026	Digital download; streaming	Austin Millz remix	Atlantic	
United States	February 27, 2026	CD single; 7-inch single	Original	Atlantic	
Europe	February 27, 2026	CD single; 7-inch single	Original	Atlantic	
United Kingdom	February 27, 2026	CD single; 7-inch single	Original	Atlantic	
