= Jamareo Artis =

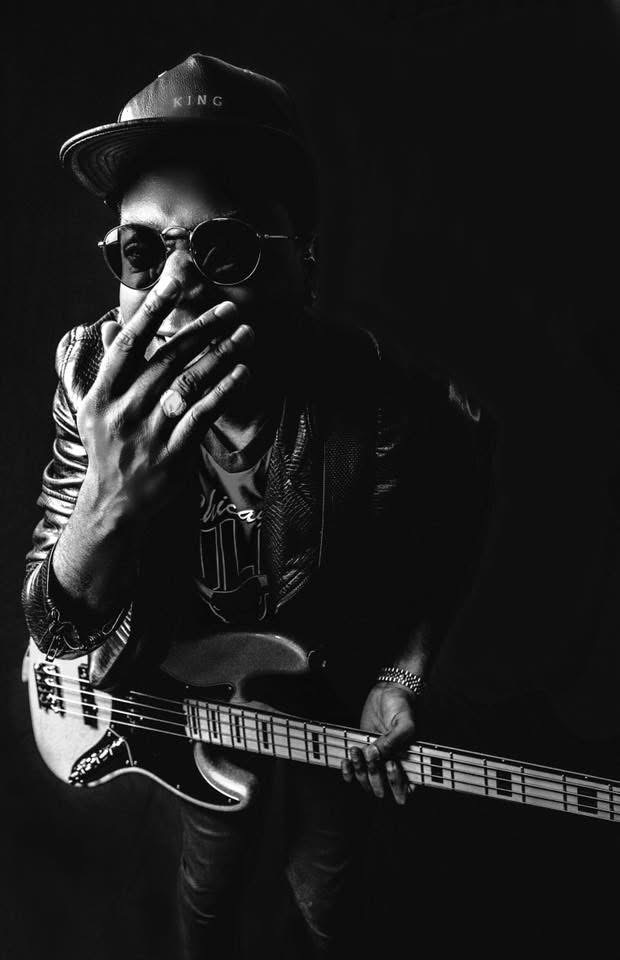

Background information
- Also known as: Jam
- Genres: Pop, rock, gospel, soul
- Occupations: Musician, performance artist
- Instruments: Bass, vocals

Jamareo "Jam" Artis is an American bassist, session musician, and producer who is most known for his work touring and recording with Bruno Mars, playing bass on "Uptown Funk" and "I Just Might”. He has also recorded for other artists, including country singer Keith Urban.

Artis got his start into the mainstream music industry after winning the 2009 MTV reality show Making His Band. Artis has toured with Bruno Mars since 2010 and has done several TV performances, which includes the 2014 Super Bowl XLVIII halftime show with Mars (also with the Red Hot Chili Peppers) and the Super Bowl 50 halftime show in 2016 with Mars, which also included Beyonce and Coldplay.

Jamareo has also appeared in many of Bruno Mars's music videos, including "Uptown Funk", "Locked out of Heaven", "Gorilla", "Treasure", "24K Magic", "Finesse", and Silk Sonic's "Smokin out the Window".

== Early life ==
Artis was born in Wilson, North Carolina, and began playing bass at the age of 10. He has cited James Jamerson, Willie Weeks, Jaco Pastorius, Ron Carter, Ray Brown, Marcus Miller, and Nathan East as his biggest inspirations. He graduated from Ralph L. Fike High School in 2007.

== Discography ==
- Liberation (EP)
- The Red BoomBox (LP)
- Infinity: The Soundtrack of a Wandering Mind
