= Steve Tirpak =

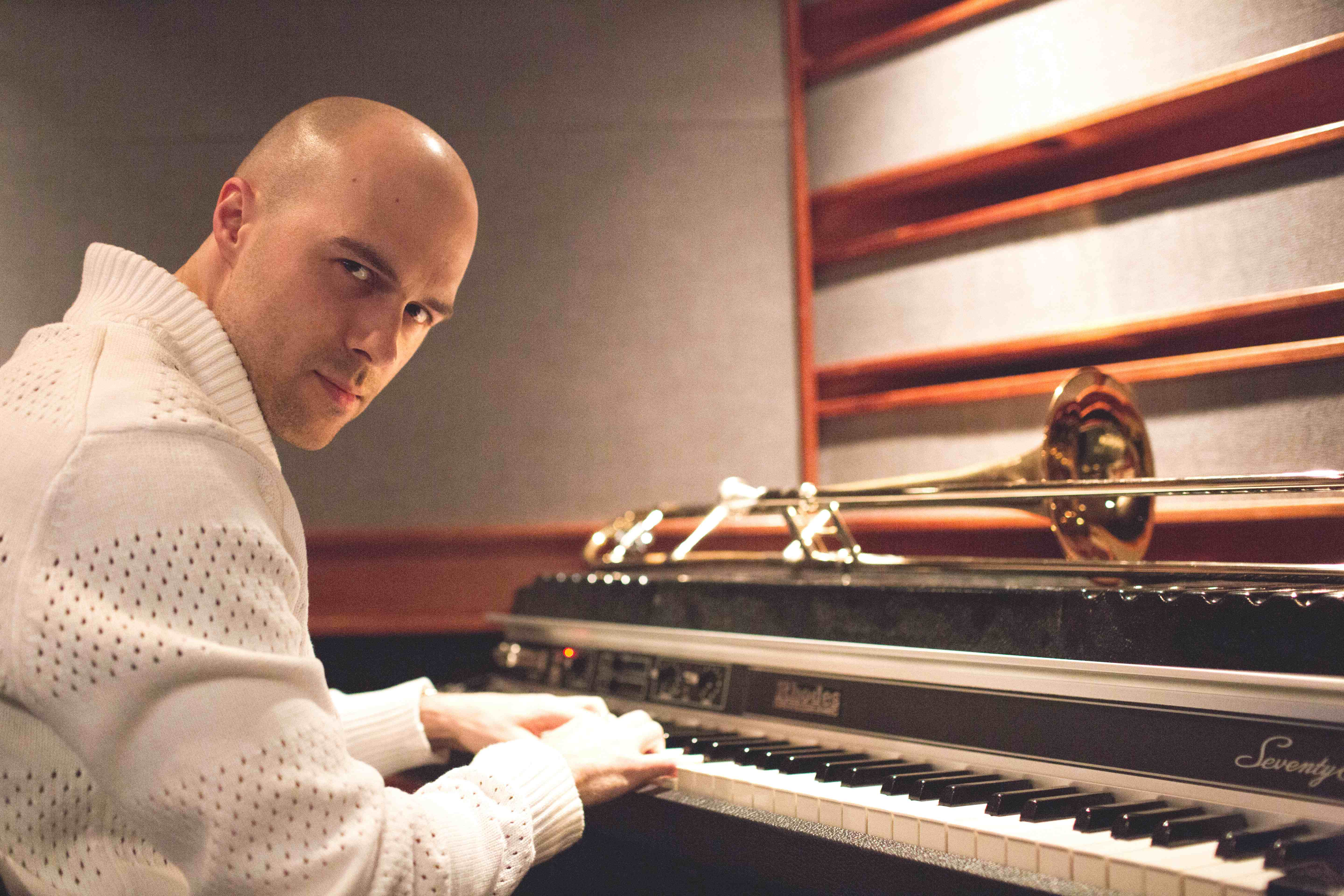
- Tirpak at Platinum Sound, NYC

Background information
- Born: 1981 (age 44–45); Edgewater Park, New Jersey, United States
- Occupations: Music producer, composer, arranger
- Years active: 2004–present
- Website: www.pakmanmusik.com

Steve Tirpak (born 1981) is an American musician from Edgewater Park, New Jersey, United States. He plays piano, trumpet, trombone and has produced, toured and arranged for a number of contemporary musicians including Jay-Z, Erykah Badu, Lana Del Rey, Kirk Franklin, P. Diddy, The Roots, LL Cool J, Will Smith, Kanye West, Kid Cudi, Estelle, Luther Vandross, R. Kelly, Boyz II Men, Vivian Green, Notorious B.I.G., Gerald Levert, Mindi Abair, Kindred, Young Gunz, and many others. Tirpak toured with John Legend playing trumpet and trombone from 2007 to 2010.

== Early life ==
Tirpak's' parents are also professional musicians and music teachers. With their encouragement, he spent his early years studying violin and drums. He attended the High School for Creative and Performing Arts and then studied music composition at the University of the Arts Tirpak studied jazz and classical composition with Evan Solot through whom he met Larry Gold and worked at The Studio as a copyist and session musician, playing horns on many Pop, Hip-Hop and R&B records.

== Career ==
Honing his arranging skills while working with Larry Gold, in 2007 Tirpak was hired to the John Legend Evolver World Tour as horn arranger and trombonist. Following the tour's end, Tirpak continued his arranging while simultaneously delving into orchestral work. He wrote for George Michael's Symphonica Tour in 2012, and composed for full orchestra for Jay-Z's benefit performance at Carnegie Hall later that year. Tirpak has appeared on the television shows Jimmy Kimmel Live, The Tonight Show with Jay Leno, and The Late Show with David Letterman.

Tirpak served as the Assistant Director of the Creative Music Program at the Kimmel Center. Many of his students went on to receive full scholarships at the most respected music schools in the United States including Berklee, Manhattan School of Music and The Juilliard School.

In 2020 Steve produced a Holiday EP with America's Got Talent winner Bianca Ryan titled [What The World Needs Now Is Love]. The album was recorded completely virtually during the Corona Pandemic.

== Discography ==
=== Musician credits ===
- Let God Sort Em Out - Clipse (2025)
- Love in the Future – John Legend (2013)
- "Unconditional" – Ne–Yo (2012)
- 84th Academy Awards (2012)
- Laughing Down Crying – Daryl Hall (2011)
- The Beginning (The Black Eyed Peas album) – The Black Eyed Peas (2010)
- Man on the Moon II: The Legend of Mr. Rager – Kid Cudi (2010)
- Evolver – John Legend (2008)
- New Amerykah Part One (4th World War) – Erykah Badu (2008)
- Double Up (R. Kelly album) – R. Kelly (2007)
- Once Again (2006)
- 2005 MTV Video Music Awards (2005)
- Lost and Found – Will Smith (2005)
- So Amazing: An All–Star Tribute to Luther Vandross – Various Artists (2005)
- Happy People/U Saved Me – R. Kelly (2004)
- Throwback, Vol. 1 – Boyz II Men (2004)
- Get Lifted – John Legend (2004)

=== Soundtracks ===
- Bessie Motion Picture Soundtrack (2018)
- Robots Motion Picture Soundtrack (2005)
