= D'Mile =

American record producer (born 1985)

- Born: Dernst Emile II; January 24, 1985 (age 41)
- Origin: New York City, U.S.
- Labels: Medinah; Darkchild
- Management: Natalie Prospere

Dernst "D'Mile" Emile II (born January 24, 1985) is an American record producer and songwriter from Brooklyn, New York City. He received his first production credits on the 2005 albums Music of the Sun by Rihanna and The Breakthrough by Mary J. Blige, after which he began working under the wing of Rodney "Darkchild" Jerkins. At a young age, he signed with Sean and Colin Muhammad's Medinah Entertainment.

In 2020, he was nominated for seven Grammy Awards through his production work for H.E.R. and Lucky Daye. D'Mile became the first songwriter in Grammy history to win Song of the Year for two consecutive years—in 2021 as co-writer on H.E.R.'s song "I Can't Breathe" and in 2022 for Silk Sonic's "Leave the Door Open". D'Mile also won an Academy Award for Best Original Song for co-writing the song "Fight for You" from the film Judas and the Black Messiah.

== Early life ==
Emile is the son of Haitian vocalist Yanick Étienne, who was featured in recordings by and toured with Bryan Ferry and Roxy Music in the 1980s, and music producer Dernst Emile. He grew up in Flatbush, Brooklyn, New York City, and began learning to play the keyboard as a young child.

== Career ==
=== 2005–2012: Career beginnings ===
Emile made his major production debut on Rihanna's 2005 album Music of the Sun, for which he produced & co-wrote "That La, La, La" with fellow Brooklyn hip-hop group Full Force. Later the same year, he also made an appearance on Mary J. Blige's 2005 album The Breakthrough with the song "Gonna Breakthrough," which he co-wrote and produced. After these bodies of work, a friend introduced D'Mile to Rodney Jerkins, with whom he had an apprenticeship for two years.

He scored his first main chart success with Janet Jackson's tenth studio album, Discipline. He produced and co-wrote the lead single "Feedback," which reached number one on the U.S. Hot Dance Club Play chart, the R&B hit "Luv" as well as the album tracks "I.D.," "Truth or Dare," and "The Meaning."

Justin Bieber worked with D'Mile on "Favorite Girl," which is the fourth single from his debut album My World. D'Mile is also listed as producing the R&B ballad "In the Morning" for Mary J. Blige's ninth album Stronger with Each Tear.

He then worked with Diddy and Dirty Money on their album Last Train To Paris, which was released December 14, 2010. D'Mile produced the song "Shades," which was co-produced with Justin Timberlake's production group The Y's and featured guest vocals from Timberlake, Lil Wayne, Bilal, and James Fauntleroy II. He also has several productions on Jennifer Lopez's 2011 comeback album, Love? including "One Love"; and the dance-pop number "(What Is) Love?" which was released as the lead soundtrack single and scored in Lopez's 2010 romantic comedy, The Back-up Plan.

D'Mile produced several songs and served as the executive producer for Diggy Simmons' album, Unexpected Arrival, which was released March 20, 2012 on Atlantic Records. D'Mile produced the single "Long Distance" by 2011 X-Factor winner Melanie Amaro, which she performed live on the show on December 6, 2012.

=== 2013–present: Current projects ===
D'Mile has a strong production record with Ty Dolla Sign, including his Beach House series, Beach House, Beach House 2, Beach House EP, and Beach House 3. Ty Dolla Sign has said that D'Mile is "literally the best producer [he has] ever worked with" following their collaborations. He also produced "Livin' It Up" from Ciara's 2013 album Ciara.

In 2016, he produced the two tracks "Mind Of A Man" and "FWM" for Hard II Love by Usher.

Throughout 2016 and 2017, D'Mile produced all 13 songs on Lucky Daye's debut album titled Painted after the two met in LA. D'Mile also provided background vocals on the song "Paint It." The album was released in 2019 and went on to be nominated at the 2020 Grammy Awards for Best R&B Album, with two album tracks being nominated for Best R&B Performance ("Roll Some Mo") and Best Traditional R&B Performance ("Real Games").

In 2020, he co-produced Charlie Wilson's "Forever Valentine" with Bruno Mars and The Stereotypes. He and Mars also composed Arashi's "Whenever You Call". In 2021, he produced along with Mars An Evening with Silk Sonic for Mars and Andersoon Paak's super duo Silk Sonic. In 2024, he co-produced "Die with a Smile" by Lady Gaga and Mars, as well as "Number One Girl" for Rosé. In 2026, he co-produced alongside Mars the latter's fourth solo studio album,The Romantic. He also served as a producer for the song Runway (song).

== Selected discography ==
This is a non-comprehensive list of D'Mile's production credits, adapted from Tidal.

Year	Song	Artist	Album
2008	"I'm Grown"	Tiffany Evans	Tiffany Evans
2008	"Sorry"	Noel Gourdin	After My Time
2013	"nEXt"	Sevyn Streeter	Call Me Crazy, But...
2013	"Come on Over"	Sevyn Streeter	Call Me Crazy, But...
2013	"Alone"	Armin van Buuren featuring Lauren Evans	Intense
2014	"Wood & Leather"	Ty Dolla Sign	Beach House EP
2014	"Work"	Ty Dolla Sign	Beach House EP
2014	"Royalty"	Mali Music	Mali Is...
2014	"Stronger"	Mali Music	Mali Is...
2014	"Fight for You"	Mali Music	Mali Is...
2014	"No Lights"	Chris Brown	X
2015	"These Lines"	PJ	Walking Around Pools
2015	"Nickels & Dimes"	PJ	Walking Around Pools
2015	"I Mean It"	PJ	Walking Around Pools
2015	"LA" feat. Kendrick Lamar, Brandy and James Fauntleroy	Ty Dolla Sign	Free TC
2015	"Saved" feat. E-40	Ty Dolla Sign	Free TC
2015	"Solid" feat. Babyface	Ty Dolla Sign	Free TC
2015	"Credit" feat. Sevyn Streeter	Ty Dolla Sign	Free TC
2015	"Miracle / Wherever" feat. Big TC & D-Loc	Ty Dolla Sign	Free TC
2015	"Actress" feat. R. Kelly	Ty Dolla Sign	Free TC
2016	"Come Down"	PJ	Rare
2016	"Awake"	PJ	Rare
2016	"Can't Stop"	PJ	Rare
2016	"This Is What It Looks Like"	PJ	Rare
2016	"Gangster"	PJ	Rare
2016	"I'm Good"	PJ	Rare
2017	"Famous"	Ty Dolla Sign	Beach House 3
2017	"Famous Lies"	Ty Dolla Sign	Beach House 3
2017	"Famous Last Words"	Ty Dolla Sign	Beach House 3
2017	"Famous Friends"	Ty Dolla Sign	Beach House 3
2017	"Famous Amy"	Ty Dolla Sign	Beach House 3
2017	"Famous Excuses"	Ty Dolla Sign	Beach House 3
2018	"BOSS"	The Carters	Everything Is Love
2019	"Whoa"	Snoh Aalegra	Ugh, those feels again
2020	"Forever Valentine"	Charlie Wilson	Non-album single
2020	"17"	Pink Sweats	The Prelude
2020	"Ass Like That"	Victoria Monet	Jaguar
2020	"Dive"	Victoria Monet	Jaguar
2020	"Big Boss (Interlude)"	Victoria Monet	Jaguar
2020	"We Might Even Be Falling In Love"	Victoria Monet	Jaguar
2020	"Touch Me"	Victoria Monet	Jaguar
2020	"Jaguar"	Victoria Monet	Jaguar
2020	"Go There With You"	Victoria Monet	Jaguar
2020	"Moment"	Victoria Monet	Jaguar
2020	"Sunday Morning"	Chiiild	Synthetic Soul
2021	"Leave the Door Open"	Silk Sonic	An Evening with Silk Sonic
2021	"Smokin Out the Window"	Silk Sonic	An Evening with Silk Sonic
2021	"Skate"	Silk Sonic	An Evening with Silk Sonic
2024	"Number One Girl"	Rosé	Rosie
2024	"Die With a Smile"	Lady Gaga and Bruno Mars	Mayhem
2026	"I Just Might"	Bruno Mars	The Romantic
2026	"Risk It All"	Bruno Mars	The Romantic

== Awards and nominations ==
=== Academy Awards ===
Year	Nominee / work	Award	Result	Ref.
2021	"Fight for You"	Best Original Song	Won	

=== Asian Pop Music Awards ===
Year	Nominee / work	Award	Result	Ref.
2025	"Number One Girl"	Best Composer	Nominated	

=== Golden Globe Awards ===
Year	Nominee / work	Award	Result	Ref.
2021	"Fight for You"	Best Original Song	Nominated	

=== Grammy Awards ===
Year	Nominee / work	Award	Result	Ref.
2017	"Still"	Best Traditional R&B Performance	Nominated	
2019	"Could've Been"	Best R&B Song	Nominated	
2019	"Roll Some Mo"	Best R&B Song	Nominated	
2020	"I Can't Breathe"	Song of the Year	Won	
2022	"Leave the Door Open"	Record of the Year	Won	
2022	"Leave the Door Open"	Best R&B Song	Won	
2022	"Leave the Door Open"	Song of the Year	Won	
2022	"Fight for You"	Song of the Year	Nominated	
2022	"Fight for You"	Best Song Written for Visual Media	Nominated	
2022	Table for Two	Best Progressive R&B Album	Won	
2022	"Hold Us Together" (Hope Mix)	Best Contemporary Christian Music Performance/Song	Nominated	
2023	Good Morning Gorgeous	Album of the Year	Nominated	
2023	"Good Morning Gorgeous"	Record of the Year	Nominated	
2023	"Good Morning Gorgeous"	Best R&B Song	Nominated	
2023	Himself	Producer of the Year, Non-Classical	Nominated	
2024	Himself	Producer of the Year, Non-Classical	Nominated	
2024	Jaguar II	Best R&B Album	Won	
2024	"On My Mama"	Record of the Year	Nominated	
2024	"On My Mama"	Best R&B Song	Nominated	
2025	"Die with a Smile"	Song of the Year	Nominated	
2025	Himself	Producer of the Year, Non-Classical	Nominated	
2025	Algorithm	Best Engineered Album, Non-Classical	Nominated	
2027	Himself	Producer of the Year, Non-Classical	Nominated	
