= Bruno Mars discography =

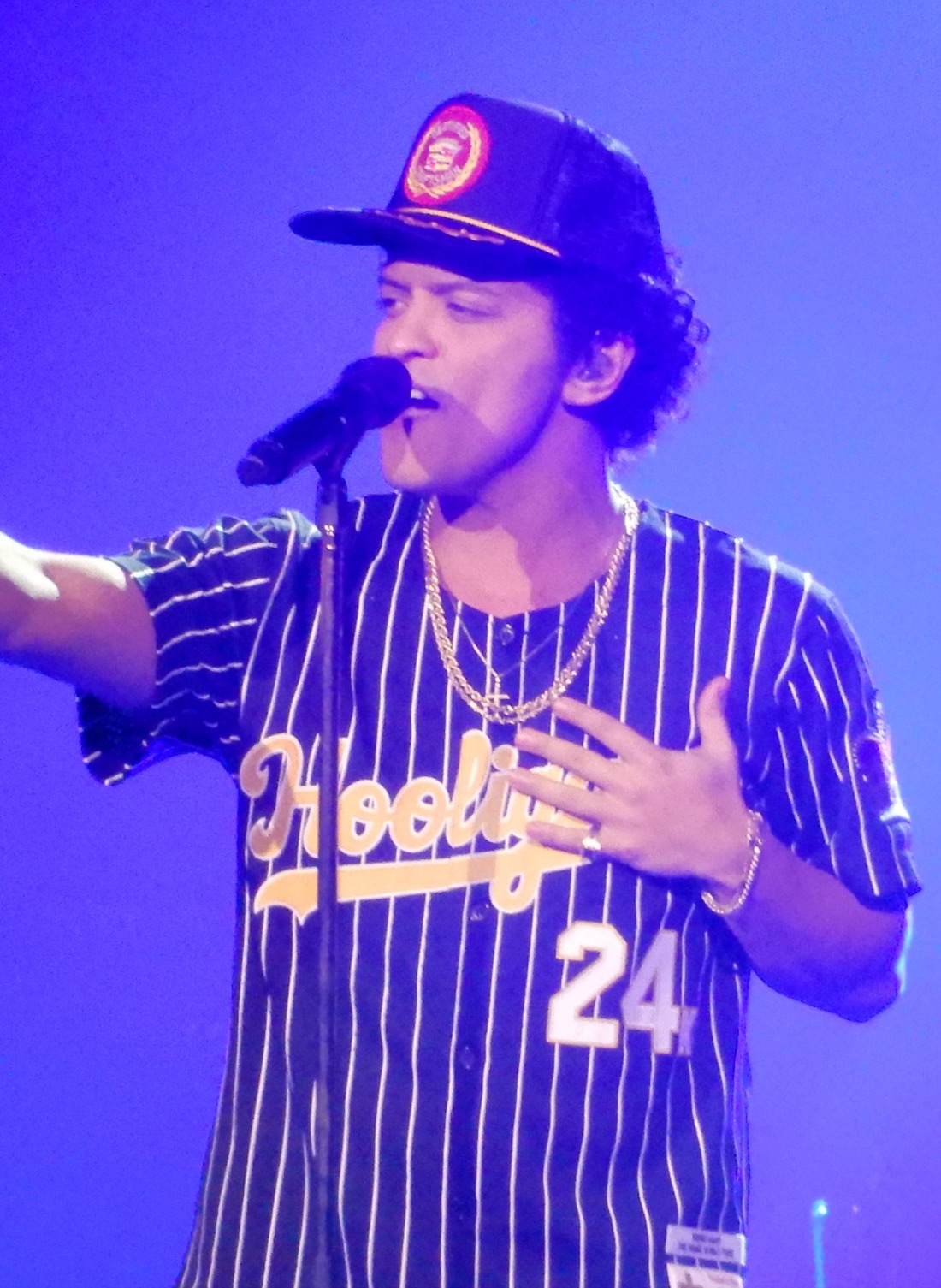
- Mars performing on the 24K Magic World Tour in 2017
- Studio albums: 4
- Extended plays: 1
- Singles: 42
- Promotional singles: 4
- Collaborative albums: 1

American singer-songwriter Bruno Mars has released four solo studio albums, one collaborative studio album, one compilation album, one EPs, 42 singles (eight as a featured artist) and four promotional singles. According to the Recording Industry Association of America (RIAA), Mars has 120.5 million certified digital singles in the United States, and has seven Diamond certified songs as of October 2025. Six of his singles appeared on multiple year-end top global singles lists published by the International Federation of the Phonographic Industry (IFPI). The publication declared him as the 2011's best-selling music artist worldwide. With estimated sales of over 150 million records worldwide, Mars is one of the best-selling artists of all time.

After he signed with Atlantic Records in 2009, he composed (as part of production group the Smeezingtons) and sang guest vocals on the debut singles of American rappers B.o.B ("Nothin' on You", 2009) and Travie McCoy ("Billionaire", 2010). "Nothin' on You" peaked at number one on the US Billboard Hot 100 as well as in the United Kingdom, and was certified six-times Platinum by the RIAA. Mars released his debut album Doo-Wops & Hooligans that year. Its singles "Just the Way You Are" and "Grenade" topped the charts in the US, Australia, Canada, New Zealand, and the UK, and have been certified 21 and 16-times Platinum, respectively, by the RIAA. They were both certified seven-times Platinum by the Australian Recording Industry Association (ARIA), and also both certified Diamond by Music Canada (MC). "The Lazy Song" topped the charts in Denmark and the UK and was certified Diamond by the RIAA and MC. Doo-Wops & Hooligans topped the charts in Canada, Germany, Ireland, Switzerland and in the UK. It received a nine-times platinum certification in the US, Diamond certification in Canada and 11-times Platinum certification in New Zealand.

In 2011, Mars released the MC diamond certified single "Marry You". It was also certified seven-times Platinum by the RIAA. He also recorded "It Will Rain" for the soundtrack of The Twilight Saga: Breaking Dawn – Part 1, certified eight times platinum by MC, and appeared on a number of collaborative singles, including "Young, Wild & Free" by Snoop Dogg and Wiz Khalifa, which was certified six-times Platinum by the RIAA. Mars's second album, Unorthodox Jukebox (2012), reached number one in the US, Australia, Canada, Switzerland, and the UK. The album's first two singles, "Locked Out of Heaven", certified diamond by the RIAA and MC, and "When I Was Your Man", certified 11-times Platinum by the RIAA and diamond by MC, topped the Billboard Hot 100. They were both certified seven-times Platinum by the Recorded Music NZ (RMNZ). "Treasure" was certified seven-times platinum by MC. In 2014, Mars provided vocals on Mark Ronson's "Uptown Funk", which topped the US, Australia, Canada, New Zealand, and UK music charts. It was certified 11-times Platinum by the RIAA, 22-times Platinum by the ARIA, and Diamond by MC.

His third studio album, 24K Magic (2016) peaked within the top five in the US, Australia, Canada, New Zealand, and the UK. It spawned the internationally successful singles "24K Magic", "That's What I Like" and "Finesse", with "24K Magic" reaching number-one in New Zealand and being certified diamond by MC. "That's What I Like" topped the charts in the United States and was certified diamond by the RIAA and MC. "Finesse" was certified seven-times Platinum by MC. In 2018, Gucci Mane, Mars, and Kodak Black released the single "Wake Up in the Sky", which was certified six-times Platinum by the RIAA. In 2021, Mars and Anderson .Paak, as Silk Sonic, released the collaborative album An Evening with Silk Sonic. The album reached the top five in the US, Australia, Canada, Denmark, and New Zealand. The lead single, "Leave the Door Open", reached the top ten on several charts peaking at number one in the United States and New Zealand. It was certified six-times Platinum by MC.

In 2024, Mars recorded a standalone single, "Die with a Smile" with Lady Gaga, which topped both the Billboard Global 200 for eighteen weeks. The song topped the US, Canada, Netherlands, New Zealand, and Switzerland charts. He also collaborated with Rosé on "APT.", his second single to top the Billboard Global 200 for twelve weeks. It also achieved the top spot in Australia, Germany, New Zealand, and Switzerland. Both tracks were certified eight-times Platinum by ARIA and eight and nine times Platinum by MC, respectively. His fourth album, The Romantic (2026), reached number one in the US and Canada and top five in the Australia, New Zealand and the UK. Its lead single, "I Just Might", peaked at number one in the US, Canada and the Netherlands, while second single "Risk It All" reached number four in the United States and number two in New Zealand.

== Albums ==
=== Studio albums ===
List of studio albums, with selected chart positions, sales figures and certifications
Title	Album details	Peak chart positions										Sales (Note: Sales figures for albums and EPs take equivalent units into account.)	Certifications
Title	Album details	US	AUS	CAN	DEN	GER	IRL	NLD	NZ	SWI	UK	Sales	Certifications
Doo-Wops & Hooligans	Released: October 4, 2010; Label: Elektra, Atlantic; Formats: Digital download, CD, LP	3	2	1	2	1	1	1	2	1	1	US: 2,630,000 (Note: United States sales figures for Doo-Wops & Hooligans as of 2017.); UK: 1,712,854 (Note: United Kingdom sales figures for Doo-Wops & Hooligans as of 2016.)	RIAA: 9× Platinum; ARIA: 8× Platinum; BPI: 8× Platinum; BVMI: 7× Gold; IFPI DEN: 8× Platinum; IFPI SWI: 2× Platinum; IRMA: 4× Platinum; MC: Diamond; NVPI: Gold; RMNZ: 13× Platinum
Unorthodox Jukebox	Released: December 7, 2012; Label: Atlantic; Formats: Digital download, CD, LP	1	1	1	6	4	3	4	2	1	1	US: 2,574,000 (Note: United States sales figures for Unorthodox Jukebox as of 2017.); UK: 987,854 (Note: United Kingdom sales figures for Unorthodox Jukebox as of 2016.)	RIAA: 6× Platinum; ARIA: 3× Platinum; BPI: 4× Platinum; BVMI: Platinum; IFPI DEN: 4× Platinum; IFPI SWI: Platinum; IRMA: 2× Platinum; MC: 8× Platinum; RMNZ: 8× Platinum
24K Magic	Released: November 18, 2016; Label: Atlantic; Formats: Digital download, CD, LP, streaming, CD+Blu-ray	2	3	2	6	9	4	5	2	4	3	US: 1,000,000 (Note: United States sales figures for 24K Magic as of 2017.)	RIAA: 3× Platinum; ARIA: Platinum; BPI: 2× Platinum; IFPI DEN: 2× Platinum; MC: 5× Platinum; NVPI: Platinum; RMNZ: 7× Platinum
The Romantic	Released: February 27, 2026; Label: Atlantic; Formats: Digital download, CD, LP, streaming	1	2	1	3	3	7	2	2	3	3	US: 221,000	BPI: Silver; MC: Platinum; RMNZ: Gold

=== Collaborative albums ===
List of collaborative albums, with selected chart positions, sales figures and certifications
Title	Album details	Peak chart positions										Sales (Note: Sales figures for albums and EPs take equivalent units into account.)	Certifications
Title	Album details	US	AUS	CAN	DEN	GER	IRL	NLD	NZ	SWI	UK	Sales	Certifications
An Evening with Silk Sonic (with Anderson .Paak as Silk Sonic)	Released: November 12, 2021; Label: Aftermath, Atlantic; Formats: Digital download, CD, streaming, LP	2	4	3	5	14	5	3	3	5	9	US: 104,000	RIAA: Platinum; BPI: Gold; IFPI DEN: Platinum; MC: Platinum; NVPI: Gold; RMNZ: 2× Platinum

=== Compilation albums ===
List of compilation albums, with selected chart positions
Title	Album details	Peak chart positions		
Title	Album details	US	NLD	UK
Collaborations	Released: April 18, 2026; Label: Atlantic; Format: LP	— (Note: "Collaborations" did not enter the Billboard 200, but peaked at number 10 on the Top Album Sales.)	8	— (Note: "Collaborations" did not enter the UK Albums Chart, but peaked at number 15 on the UK Albums Sales chart.)

== Extended plays ==
List of extended plays, with selected chart positions, sales figures and certifications
Title	Details	Peak chart positions		Sales	Certifications
Title	Details	US	UK	Sales	Certifications
It's Better If You Don't Understand	Released: May 11, 2010; Label: Elektra, Atlantic; Formats: Digital download, LP	99	97	US: 27,000 (Note: United States sales figures for It's Better If You Don't Understand as of 2017.)	MC: Platinum

== Singles ==
=== As lead artist ===
==== 2010s ====
List of singles as lead artist, with selected chart positions and certifications, showing year released and album name
Title	Year	Peak chart positions										Certifications	Album
Title	Year	US	AUS	CAN	DEN	GER	IRL	NLD	NZ	SWI	UK	Certifications	Album
"Just the Way You Are"	2010	1	1	1	6	2	1	1	1	3	1	RIAA: 21× Platinum; ARIA: 7× Platinum; BPI: 6× Platinum; BVMI: 5× Gold; IFPI DEN: 4× Platinum; IFPI SWI: Platinum; MC: Diamond; RMNZ: 8× Platinum	Doo-Wops & Hooligans
"Grenade"	2010	1	1	1	1	1	1	2	1	1	1	RIAA: 16× Platinum; ARIA: 7× Platinum; BPI: 4× Platinum; BVMI: 3× Gold; IFPI DEN: 4× Platinum; IFPI SWI: 3× Platinum; MC: Diamond; RMNZ: 6× Platinum	Doo-Wops & Hooligans
"The Lazy Song"	2011	4	6	5	1	9	4	4	3	9	1	RIAA: Diamond; ARIA: 5× Platinum; BPI: 3× Platinum; BVMI: Gold; IFPI DEN: Platinum; IFPI SWI: Platinum; MC: Diamond; RMNZ: 4× Platinum	Doo-Wops & Hooligans
"Talking to the Moon" (Note: "Talking to the Moon" was only released as a single in Brazil.)	2011	—	81	—	—	—	—	—	—	92	—	RIAA: 6× Platinum; BVMI: Gold; IFPI DEN: Platinum; MC: 7× Platinum; RMNZ: 4× Platinum	Doo-Wops & Hooligans
"Marry You"	2011	85	8	10	32	15	5	13	5	16	11	RIAA: 7× Platinum; ARIA: 2× Platinum; BPI: 3× Platinum; BVMI: Platinum; IFPI DEN: 2× Platinum; IFPI SWI: Gold; MC: Diamond; RMNZ: 4× Platinum	Doo-Wops & Hooligans
"It Will Rain"	2011	3	14	5	11	14	11	35	2	22	14	RIAA: 5× Platinum; ARIA: 2× Platinum; BPI: Platinum; BVMI: Gold; IFPI DEN: Gold; IFPI SWI: Gold; MC: 8× Platinum; RMNZ: 4× Platinum	The Twilight Saga: Breaking Dawn – Part 1
"Count On Me" (Note: "Count On Me" was only released as a single in Australia.)	2011	—	19	—	—	—	—	—	13	55	78	RIAA: 5× Platinum; ARIA: 3× Platinum; BPI: Platinum; BVMI: Gold; IFPI DEN: Platinum; IFPI SWI: Gold; MC: 6× Platinum; RMNZ: 3× Platinum	Doo-Wops & Hooligans
"Locked Out of Heaven"	2012	1	4	1	2	7	4	5	4	8	2	RIAA: Diamond; ARIA: 7× Platinum; BPI: 4× Platinum; BVMI: 2× Platinum; IFPI DEN: 3× Platinum; IFPI SWI: Platinum; MC: Diamond; RMNZ: 8× Platinum	Unorthodox Jukebox
"When I Was Your Man"	2013	1	6	3	4	23	6	7	4	12	2	RIAA: 11× Platinum; ARIA: 6× Platinum; BPI: 4× Platinum; BVMI: 3× Gold; IFPI DEN: 4× Platinum; IFPI SWI: Platinum; MC: Diamond; RMNZ: 7× Platinum	Unorthodox Jukebox
"Treasure"	2013	5	10	4	14	17	9	11	7	13	12	RIAA: 5× Platinum; ARIA: 2× Platinum; BPI: 2× Platinum; BVMI: Gold; IFPI DEN: Platinum; IFPI SWI: Gold; MC: 8× Platinum; RMNZ: 4× Platinum	Unorthodox Jukebox
"Gorilla"	2013	22	41	23	—	—	53	31	—	—	62	RIAA: Platinum; ARIA: Gold; BPI: Silver; MC: 2× Platinum; RMNZ: Gold	Unorthodox Jukebox
"Young Girls"	2013	32	62	19	—	—	78	— (Note: "Young Girls" did not enter the Dutch Top 40, but peaked at number 18 on the Tipparade singles chart.)	23	—	83	RIAA: Platinum; ARIA: Gold; BPI: Silver; MC: Gold; RMNZ: Platinum	Unorthodox Jukebox
"24K Magic"	2016	4	3	3	18	14	10	6	1	9	5	RIAA: 5× Platinum; ARIA: 5× Platinum; BPI: 3× Platinum; BVMI: Platinum; IFPI DEN: 2× Platinum; IFPI SWI: Gold; MC: Diamond; RMNZ: 6× Platinum	24K Magic
"That's What I Like"	2017	1	5	3	18	51	20	19	4	39	12	RIAA: Diamond; ARIA: 4× Platinum; BPI: 3× Platinum; BVMI: Gold; IFPI DEN: Platinum; MC: Diamond; RMNZ: 9× Platinum	24K Magic
"Versace on the Floor" (Note: A remix of the song by David Guetta was also released as a single.)	2017	33	57	43	—	—	—	—	27	—	59	RIAA: 2× Platinum; ARIA: 2× Platinum; BPI: Platinum; IFPI DEN: Platinum; MC: 4× Platinum; RMNZ: 4× Platinum	24K Magic
"Chunky" (Note: "Chunky" was only released as a single in Australia.)	2017	— (Note: "Chunky" did not enter the Billboard Hot 100, but peaked at number eight on the Bubbling Under Hot 100 chart, which acts as an extension to the Hot 100.)	—	—	—	—	—	—	— (Note: "Chunky" did not enter the NZ Top 40 Singles Chart, but peaked at number two on the NZ Heatseeker Singles Chart.)	—	79	RIAA: Gold; BPI: Silver; MC: Platinum; RMNZ: 2× Platinum	24K Magic
"Finesse" (Note: This version of the song only appears on the deluxe edition of 24K Magic.) (solo or featuring Cardi B)	2018	3	6	3	14	31	5	9	2	29	5	RIAA: 5× Platinum; ARIA: 3× Platinum; BPI: 2× Platinum; BVMI: Gold; IFPI DEN: Platinum; IFPI SWI: Gold; MC: 8× Platinum; RMNZ: 5× Platinum	24K Magic
"Wake Up in the Sky" (with Gucci Mane and Kodak Black)	2018	11	46	36	—	—	49	— (Note: "Wake Up in the Sky" did not enter the Dutch Top 40, but peaked at number eighteen on the Tipparade singles chart.)	— (Note: "Wake Up in the Sky" did not enter the NZ Top 40 Singles Chart, but peaked at number five on the NZ Hot Singles Chart.)	95	65	RIAA: 6× Platinum; ARIA: Platinum; BPI: Gold; IFPI DEN: Gold; RMNZ: 2× Platinum	Evil Genius
"Please Me" (with Cardi B)	2019	3	22	12	37	83	21	— (Note: "Please Me" did not enter the Dutch Top 40, but peaked at number three on the Tipparade singles chart.)	12	57	12	RIAA: 3× Platinum; ARIA: 3× Platinum; BPI: Platinum; MC: 3× Platinum; RMNZ: 2× Platinum	Am I the Drama? (Ultimate Edition)
"Blow" (with Ed Sheeran and Chris Stapleton)	2019	60	31	39	—	93	—	— (Note: "Blow" did not enter the Dutch Top 40, but peaked at number 11 on the Tipparade singles chart.)	— (Note: "Blow" did not enter the NZ Top 40 Singles Chart, but peaked at number three on the NZ Hot Singles Chart.)	—	— (Note: "Blow" did not enter the UK singles chart, but peaked at number 21 on the UK Singles Sales.)	BPI: Silver; MC: Platinum; RMNZ: Gold	No.6 Collaborations Project

==== 2020s ====
List of singles as lead artist, with selected chart positions and certifications, showing year released and album name
Title	Year	Peak chart positions										Certifications	Album
Title	Year	US	AUS	CAN	DEN	GER	IRL	NLD	NZ	SWI	UK	Certifications	Album
"Leave the Door Open" (with Anderson .Paak as Silk Sonic)	2021	1	10	9	20	72	18	11	1	23	20	RIAA: 2× Platinum; ARIA: Gold; BPI: Platinum; IFPI DEN: Platinum; MC: 6× Platinum; NVPI: Gold; RMNZ: 4× Platinum	An Evening with Silk Sonic
"Skate" (with Anderson .Paak as Silk Sonic)	2021	14	32	19	―	―	48	24	12	34	45	BPI: Silver; MC: Platinum; RMNZ: Platinum	An Evening with Silk Sonic
"Smokin out the Window" (with Anderson .Paak as Silk Sonic)	2021	5	8	10	11	—	11	32	4	34	12	RIAA: 2× Platinum; BPI: Gold; IFPI DEN: Gold; MC: 2× Platinum; RMNZ: 2× Platinum	An Evening with Silk Sonic
"Love's Train" (with Anderson .Paak as Silk Sonic)	2022	— (Note: "Love's Train" did not enter the Billboard Hot 100, but peaked at number 11 on the Bubbling Under Hot 100 chart.)	—	—	—	—	—	—	— (Note: "Love's Train" did not enter the NZ Top 40 Singles Chart, but peaked at number 18 on the NZ Hot Singles Chart.)	—	—	MC: Gold	An Evening with Silk Sonic
"After Last Night" (Note: "After Last Night" was only released as a single to US urban adult contemporary radio stations.) (with Anderson .Paak as Silk Sonic, Thundercat and Bootsy Collins)	2022	68	—	92	—	—	—	—	— (Note: "After Last Night" did not enter the NZ Top 40 Singles Chart, but peaked at number eight on the NZ Hot Singles Chart.)	—	— (Note: "After Last Night" did not enter the UK singles chart, but peaked at number 90 on the UK Singles Sales.)	MC: Platinum; RMNZ: Platinum	An Evening with Silk Sonic
"Die with a Smile" (with Lady Gaga)	2024	1	2	1	3	4	3	1	1	1	2	ARIA: 8× Platinum; BPI: 3× Platinum; BVMI: Platinum; IFPI DEN: 2× Platinum; IFPI SWI: Platinum; MC: 8× Platinum; RMNZ: 6× Platinum	Mayhem
"APT." (with Rosé)	2024	3	1	1	6	1	3	1	1	1	2	RIAA: 5× Platinum; ARIA: 8× Platinum; BPI: 3× Platinum; BVMI: 3× Gold; IFPI DEN: Platinum; IFPI SWI: 2× Platinum; MC: 9× Platinum; RMNZ: 5× Platinum	Rosie
"Fat Juicy & Wet" (with Sexyy Red)	2025	17	55	27	—	—	—	— (Note: "Fat Juicy & Wet" did not enter the Dutch Top 40, but peaked at number 25 on the Tipparade singles chart.)	31	85	32	MC: Platinum	Non-album singles
"Bonde do Brunão" (Note: "Bonde do Brunão" was only released as a single in Italy.)	2025	—	—	—	—	—	—	—	—	—	—		Non-album singles
"I Just Might"	2026	1	8	1	8	11	12	1	3	12	5	ARIA: Platinum; BPI: Platinum; IFPI DEN: Gold; MC: 3× Platinum; RMNZ: Platinum	The Romantic
"Risk It All"	2026	4	13	9	35	47	34	12	2	17	15	ARIA: Platinum; BPI: Silver; MC: 2× Platinum; RMNZ: Platinum	The Romantic
"On My Soul" (Note: "On My Soul" was only released as a single in Italy and the Netherlands.)	2026	43	—	46	—	—	—	11	—	—	—		The Romantic
"Still" (with Karol G)	2026	41	—	—	—	—	—	35	—	—	—		No Me Arrepiento de Sentir Tanto
"Dance with Me"	2026	42	—	42	—	—	—	—	—	—	—	MC: Gold	The Romantic
"—" denotes items which not released in that country or failed to chart

=== As featured artist ===
List of singles as featured artist, with selected chart positions and certifications, showing year released and album name
Title	Year	Peak chart positions										Certifications	Album
Title	Year	US	AUS	CAN	DEN	GER	IRL	NLD	NZ	SWI	UK	Certifications	Album
"Nothin' on You" (B.o.B featuring Bruno Mars)	2009	1	3	10	24	22	7	1	5	28	1	RIAA: 6× Platinum; ARIA: Platinum; BPI: Platinum; IFPI DEN: Gold; MC: Platinum; RMNZ: 3× Platinum	B.o.B Presents: The Adventures of Bobby Ray
"Billionaire" (Travie McCoy featuring Bruno Mars)	2010	4	5	12	8	16	2	1	2	14	3	RIAA: 4× Platinum; ARIA: 2× Platinum; BPI: 2× Platinum; IFPI DEN: Platinum; MC: 2× Platinum; RMNZ: 3× Platinum	Lazarus
"Lighters" (Bad Meets Evil featuring Bruno Mars)	2011	4	17	4	18	26	11	13	2	10	10	RIAA: 2× Platinum; ARIA: 3× Platinum; BPI: Gold; IFPI DEN: Gold; RMNZ: Platinum	Hell: The Sequel
"Mirror" (Lil Wayne featuring Bruno Mars)	2011	16	26	46	12	—	21	12	37	15	17	RIAA: 4× Platinum; ARIA: 2× Platinum; BVMI: Gold; BPI: Platinum; IFPI DEN: 2× Platinum; RMNZ: Platinum	Tha Carter IV
"Young, Wild & Free" (Snoop Dogg and Wiz Khalifa featuring Bruno Mars)	2011	7	4	13	19	15	33	7	2	12	44	RIAA: 6× Platinum; ARIA: 5× Platinum; BPI: Platinum; BVMI: 5× Gold; IFPI DEN: 2× Platinum; IFPI SWI: Gold; MC: 2× Platinum; RMNZ: 6× Platinum	Mac & Devin Go to High School
"Bubble Butt" (Major Lazer featuring Bruno Mars, 2 Chainz, Tyga and Mystic)	2013	56	39	—	—	—	—	— (Note: "Bubble Butt" did not enter the Dutch Top 40, but peaked at number two on the Tipparade singles chart.)	—	—	196	RIAA: Gold	Free the Universe
"Uptown Funk" (Mark Ronson featuring Bruno Mars)	2014	1	1	1	2	3	1	4	1	2	1	RIAA: 11× Platinum; ARIA: 22× Platinum; BPI: 8× Platinum; BVMI: 2× Platinum; IFPI DEN: 3× Platinum; MC: Diamond; NVPI: Platinum; RMNZ: 10× Platinum	Uptown Special
"That's Why I Love You" (Note: "That's Why I Love You" was only released as a single in Italy.) (Victoria Monét featuring Bruno Mars)	2026	—	—	—	—	—	—	—	— (Note: "That's Why I Love You" did not enter the NZ Top 40 Singles Chart, but peaked at number 26 on the NZ Hot Singles Chart.)	—	—		Frequency of Love
"—" denotes items which were not released in that country or failed to chart.

=== Promotional singles ===
List of promotional singles, with selected chart positions, certifications showing year released, and associated albums
Title	Year	Peak chart positions					Certifications	Album
Title	Year	US	CAN	NLD	NZ	UK	Certifications	Album
"Liquor Store Blues" (featuring Damian Marley)	2010	— (Note: "Liquor Store Blues" did not enter the Billboard Hot 100, but peaked at number five on the Bubbling Under Hot 100 chart.)	97	—	—	—	RIAA: Platinum; MC: Gold; RMNZ: Platinum	Doo-Wops & Hooligans
"Somewhere in Brooklyn"	2011	—	—	—	—	— (Note: "Somewhere in Brooklyn" did not enter the UK singles chart, but peaked at number 94 on the Official Singles Downloads chart chart.)		Doo-Wops & Hooligans
"Moonshine"	2012	—	—	32	—	—		Unorthodox Jukebox
"Silk Sonic Intro" (with Anderson .Paak as Silk Sonic)	2021	— (Note: "Silk Sonic Intro" did not enter the Billboard Hot 100, but peaked at number 14 on the Bubbling Under Hot 100 chart.)	—	—	— (Note: "Silk Sonic Intro" did not enter the NZ Top 40 Singles Chart, but peaked at number 34 on the NZ Hot Singles Chart.)	—		An Evening with Silk Sonic
"—" denotes items which were not released in that country or failed to chart.

== Other charted or certified songs ==
=== 2010s ===
List of songs, with selected chart positions, certifications, showing year released, and associated albums
Title	Year	Peak chart positions						Certifications	Album
Title	Year	US	CAN	GER	NZ	SWI	UK	Certifications	Album
"The Other Side" (featuring CeeLo Green and B.o.B)	2010	—	—	—	—	—	117	RIAA: Gold	Doo-Wops & Hooligans
"Rocketeer" (Far East Movement featuring Bruno Mars)	2010	—	85	—	—	—	—		Non-album song
"Runaway Baby"	2010	50	66	—	35	—	19	RIAA: 3× Platinum; BPI: Platinum; IFPI DEN: Gold; MC: 3× Platinum; RMNZ: 2× Platinum	Doo-Wops & Hooligans
"Our First Time"	2010	—	—	—	—	—	—	RIAA: Gold	Doo-Wops & Hooligans
"This Is My Love" (Gold 1 featuring Bruno Mars and Jaeson Ma)	2012	—	—	37	—	22	—		Non-album song
"Natalie"	2012	—	—	—	28	—	—	MC: Gold; RMNZ: Gold	Unorthodox Jukebox
"Show Me"	2012	—	—	—	—	—	—	RMNZ: Gold	Unorthodox Jukebox
"If I Knew"	2012	—	—	—	—	—	—	MC: Gold; RMNZ: Gold	Unorthodox Jukebox
"Perm"	2016	—	—	—	— (Note: "Perm" did not enter the NZ Top 40 Singles Chart, but peaked at number three on the NZ Heatseeker Singles Chart.)	—	—	BPI: Silver; MC: Platinum; RMNZ: Gold	24K Magic
"Straight Up & Down"	2016	—	—	—	—	—	—	MC: Gold; RMNZ: Platinum	24K Magic
"Calling All My Lovelies"	2016	—	—	—	—	—	—	MC: Gold; RMNZ: Gold	24K Magic
"Too Good to Say Goodbye"	2016	—	—	—	—	—	—	MC: Gold; RMNZ: Gold	24K Magic

=== 2020s ===
List of songs, with selected chart positions, certifications, showing year released, and associated albums
Title	Year	Peak chart positions						Certifications	Album
Title	Year	US	CAN	IRL	NZ	UK	WW	Certifications	Album
"Fly as Me" (with Anderson .Paak as Silk Sonic)	2021	81	93	51	— (Note: "Fly as Me" did not enter the NZ Top 40 Singles Chart, but peaked at number 9 on the NZ Hot Singles Chart.)	49	92	MC: Gold	An Evening with Silk Sonic
"Put on a Smile" (with Anderson .Paak as Silk Sonic)	2021	78	—	—	— (Note: "Put on a Smile" did not enter the NZ Top 40 Singles Chart, but peaked at number 10 on the NZ Hot Singles Chart.)	—	103		An Evening with Silk Sonic
"777" (with Anderson .Paak as Silk Sonic)	2021	— (Note: "777" did not enter the Billboard Hot 100, but peaked at number four on the Bubbling Under Hot 100 chart.)	—	—	—	—	132		An Evening with Silk Sonic
"Blast Off" (with Anderson .Paak as Silk Sonic)	2021	73	95	—	—	—	74		An Evening with Silk Sonic
"Cha Cha Cha"	2026	25	35	96	37	47	34	MC: Gold	The Romantic
"God Was Showing Off"	2026	28	39	—	— (Note: "God Was Showing Off" did not enter the NZ Top 40 Singles Chart, but peaked at number 4 on the NZ Hot Singles Chart.)	67	40		The Romantic
"Why You Wanna Fight?"	2026	38	41	—	— (Note: "Why You Wanna Fight?" did not enter the NZ Top 40 Singles Chart, but peaked at number 5 on the NZ Hot Singles Chart.)	—	48		The Romantic
"Something Serious"	2026	46	49	—	—	—	81		The Romantic
"Nothing Left"	2026	54	53	—	—	—	96		The Romantic
"—" denotes items which were not released in that country or failed to chart

== Guest appearances ==
List of non-single guest appearances, with other performing artists, showing year released and album name
Title	Year	Other artist(s)	Album	Ref.
"3D"	2009	Far East Movement	Animal	
"6 AM" (Note: Bruno Mars was not credit as a featured artist on the first release of "6AM". In 2012, he was credited on Bueno's mixtape Maloof Money, Vol. 3 (Executive Decisions).)	2009	Bueno	Can't Knock The Hustle	
"Love" (Note: Mars was not credit as a featured artist on the first release of "Love". He was only credited upon the release of Jaeson Ma's album Glory.)	2009	Jaeson Ma	Glory	
"Watching Her Move" (Note: Bruno Mars vocals are not credit.)	2009	Justin Michael & Blake Reary	Non-album single	
"One At a Time" (Note: Bruno Mars vocals are not credit.)	2009	Travie McCoy	Non-album single	
"Her World Goes On" (Note: Bruno Mars vocals are not credit.)	2010	Justin Michael & Kemal	Non-album single	
"Walls Come Down"	2011	Keke Palmer	Awaken Reloaded	
"Can't Come Back to Me" (Note: Bruno Mars was credit as a featured artist on the first release of "Can't Come Back to Me" in 2012. In 2016, the song was included on Layzie Bone's Mo Thug Boss with Mars's vocals not credited.)	2012	Layzie Bone	Mo Thug Boss	
"Welcome Back"	2014	—	Rio 2: Music from the Motion Picture	
"Sugar, Cocoa and Honey"	2014	Bigg Gipp	Mr. Get Down	
