= Cocky (song) =

2018 single by ASAP Rocky, Gucci Mane and 21 Savage featuring London on da Track

Single by ASAP Rocky, Gucci Mane and 21 Savage featuring London on da Track

from the album Uncle Drew: Original Motion Picture Soundtrack
- Released: February 16, 2018
- Genre: Hip hop
- Length: 3:52
- Label: ASAP Worldwide; RCA
- Songwriter(s): Rakim Mayers; Radric Davis; Shéyaa Abraham-Joseph; London Holmes; Hector Delgado
- Producer(s): London on da Track; Delgado

ASAP Rocky singles chronology
"No Limit (Remix)" (2017)	"Cocky" (2018)	"Bad Company" (2018)

Gucci Mane singles chronology
"Cool" (2018)	"Cocky" (2018)	"Solitaire" (2018)

21 Savage singles chronology
"Stash It" (2018)	"Cocky" (2018)	"Deal" (2018)

London on da Track singles chronology
"Whatever You On" (2017)	"Cocky" (2018)	"Up Now" (2018)

"Cocky" is a song by American rappers ASAP Rocky and Gucci Mane and British-American rapper 21 Savage featuring American record producer London on da Track. It was released on February 16, 2018 as the lead single from the soundtrack to the sports comedy film Uncle Drew (2018).

== Composition and lyrics ==
The production contains piano keys, skittering hi-hats, and sounds of sneakers screeching on hardwood floors. Lyrically, the rappers brag about their lavish lifestyles, women, and use basketball references. After Gucci Mane performs the chorus, in which he says he is "too fucking cocky", 21 Savage performs the first verse, in which he raps about his millions of dollars and references his song "Bank Account". The second verse finds ASAP Rocky comparing himself to a basketball player and boasts about his ability to win over women. Lastly, Gucci Mane boasts his wealth, stating in his verse that the new generation of rappers cannot compare with him in this regard.

== Critical reception ==
Charles Holmes of MTV stated the rappers "demonstrate surprising chemistry", further writing "However, it is A$AP Rocky who undoubtedly steals the show. The highlight of Rocky's verse is when the Harlem rapper aims at his growing list of copycats spitting, 'Too many fake mes / Way too many fake daps / Way too many fake '$APs.'" Winston Cook-Wilson of Spin gave a less favorable review, writing "Gucci and 21's laconic styles are both idiomatic for London on da Track's ominous, creeping backbeat. Gucci's last, whispered, and classic-era-Gucci-styled verse ('Gucci is materialistic, he's too fucking flashy/He smoke when he wanna smoke, think the world is his ashtray') is worth the price of admission for what might reasonably be considered an unremarkable song." KC Orcutt of Revolt commented the song "weaves together each rapper's style, making for a nice addition to all weekend playlists and gym soundtracks alike."

== Charts ==
Chart (2018)	Peak position
Canada (Canadian Hot 100)	83
US Bubbling Under Hot 100 Singles (Billboard)	17
