= Collaborations (Bruno Mars album) =

Compilation album by Bruno Mars
- Released: April 18, 2026
- Length: 41:14
- Label: Atlantic
- Producers: Bruno Mars; 808 Mafia; Andrew Watt; Cirkut; D'Mile; Jeff Bhasker; Lady Gaga; Mark Ronson; Omer Fedi; Ramon Owen; Rogét Chahayed; Shampoo Press & Curl; The Smeezingtons; The Stereotypes

Bruno Mars chronology
The Romantic (2026)	Collaborations (2026)

Collaborations is the first compilation album by the American singer-songwriter Bruno Mars. It was released through Atlantic Records on April 18, 2026. The album features collaborations from Anderson .Paak, B.o.B, Cardi B, Gucci Mane, Kodak Black, Lady Gaga, Lil Wayne, Mark Ronson, Rosé, and Travie McCoy. The album was released exclusively on vinyl to celebrate Mars becoming the 2026 Record Store Day ambassador. It contains singles that he collaborated on from other artists' albums, as well as his third studio album 24K Magic (2018) and An Evening with Silk Sonic (2021) by Silk Sonic, the American musical superduo composed by Mars and .Paak.

It also includes live versions of singles as well as non-album singles. The limited-edition vinyl is packaged in one double-disc set, with only 11,000 copies of the record available worldwide. Collaborations features production from Mars himself, 808 Mafia, Andrew Watt, Cirkut, D'Mile, Jeff Bhasker, Gaga, Ronson, Omer Fedi, Ramon Owen, Rogét Chahayed, Shampoo Press & Curl, the Smeezingtons, and the Stereotypes. In the United States, Mars had the second–best-selling Record Store Day 2026 exclusive album behind Pink Floyd. It also debuted on the Dutch Albums chart at number eight and the UK Albums Sales at number fifteen.

== Background and release ==
On January 30, 2026, Mars was announced as the 2026 Record Store Day ambassador. To celebrate, a limited-edition compilation album, titled Collaborations, was released exclusively on vinyl. It features some of his most prominent collaborations packaged in one double-disc set. Only 11,000 copies of the record were made available. The cover art was photographed by John V. Esparza, who also handled the package design.

Mars shared excitedly in a statement after being announced as the Ambassador: "Independent record stores are so important because you get the chance to immerse and surround yourself with music". He continued, "I love collecting vinyl because nothing is better than sitting on your couch, putting on a record and just listening to music like that. Support your local independent record store on Record Store Day this year."

Michael Kurtz, the co-founder of Record Store Day, stated that "We're thrilled to have Bruno Mars as our 2026 Ambassador". Only three collaborations were disclosed alongside the announcement of the compilation album's release. These include "Uptown Funk" with Mark Ronson, "Die With A Smile" with Lady Gaga, and "APT." with Rosé. At some point, before the album's release, a French record store disclosed the full track list. It was released through Atlantic Records on April 18, 2026.

== Commercial performance ==
Collaborations failed to chart on the US Billboard 200, but it debuted on Top Album Sales at number ten and Vinyl Albums at number five. In the United States, Mars had the second–best-selling Record Store Day 2026 exclusive album behind Live from the Los Angeles Sports Arena, April 26th, 1975, a Pink Floyd live album. It also entered the UK Albums Sales at number 15 and the Scottish Albums Official Charts at number 32. The compilation album also debuted at number eight on the Dutch Album Top 100 and number twenty on the Croatian International Albums chart. It entered the top 30 of the Hungarian Physical Albums chart and the Japanese Western Albums chart at numbers 23 and 27, respectively. On the Greek albums chart, the compilation debuted at number 61.

== Track listing ==
Collaborations track listing
No.	Title	Writer(s)	Producer(s)	Length
1.	"Nothin' on You" (B.o.B featuring Bruno Mars; from B.o.B Presents: The Adventures of Bobby Ray, 2009)	Bobby Simmons Jr.; Bruno Mars; Philip Lawrence; Ari Levine	The Smeezingtons	4:29
2.	"Billionaire" (Travie McCoy featuring Bruno Mars; from Lazarus, 2010)	McCoy; Mars; Lawrence; Levine	The Smeezingtons	3:29
3.	"Mirror" (Lil Wayne featuring Bruno Mars; from Tha Carter IV (Deluxe Edition), 2011)	Dwayne Carter Jr.; Peter Hernandez; Lawrence; Ramon Owen	REO; The Smeezingtons^{[a]}	3:48
4.	"Uptown Funk" (Mark Ronson featuring Bruno Mars; from Uptown Special, 2014)	Ronson; Mars; Lawrence; Jeff Bhasker; Nicholaus Williams; Devon Gallaspy; Charles Wilson; Robert Wilson; Ronnie Wilson; Rudolph Taylor; Lonnie Simmons	Ronson; Bhasker; Mars	4:30
5.	"Finesse" (remix, with Cardi B; from 24K Magic, 2018)	Mars; Lawrence; Christopher Brody Brown; James Fauntleroy; Johnathan Yip; Ray Romulus; Jeremy Reeves; Ray McCullough II; Belcalis Almanzar; Klenord Raphael	Shampoo Press & Curl; The Stereotypes	3:37
6.	"Wake Up in the Sky" (with Gucci Mane and Kodak Black; from Evil Genius, 2018)	Radric Davis; Hernandez; Bill Kapri; Chance Youngblood; Dwan Avery; Jeff LaCroix	808 Mafia; Mars	3:24
7.	"Please Me" (with Cardi B; non-album single, later included on Am I the Drama? (Bardi Gang Edition), 2019)	Almanzar; Mars; Fauntleroy; Yip; Romulus; Reeves; McCullough	Mars; The Stereotypes	3:20
8.	"Leave the Door Open" (live, with Anderson .Paak as Silk Sonic; originally from An Evening with Silk Sonic, 2021)	Mars; Brandon Anderson; Dernst Emile II; Brown	Mars; D'Mile	4:20
9.	"Smokin out the Window" (with Anderson .Paak as Silk Sonic; from An Evening with Silk Sonic, 2021)	Mars; Anderson; Emile	Mars; D'Mile	3:17
10.	"Die with a Smile" (with Lady Gaga; from Mayhem, 2024)	Mars; Gaga; Emile; Fauntleroy; Andrew Watt	Mars; Gaga; D'Mile; Watt	4:11
11.	"APT." (with Rosé; from Rosie, 2024)	Chae Young Park; Mars; Amy Allen; Brown; Rogét Chahayed; Omer Fedi; Lawrence; Theron Thomas; Henry Walter; Michael Chapman; Nicholas Chinn	Mars; Cirkut; Fedi; Chahayed	2:49

Notes

- ^{^[a]} signifies a co-producer

== Charts ==
List of chart positions
Chart (2026)	Peak position
Croatian International Albums (HDU)	20
Dutch Albums (Album Top 100)	8
Greek Albums (IFPI)	61
Hungarian Physical Albums (MAHASZ)	23
Japanese Western Albums (Oricon)	27
Scottish Albums (Official Charts)	32
UK Albums Sales (Official Charts)	15
US Top Album Sales (Billboard)	10
US Vinyl Albums (Billboard)	5
