= Solitaire (Gucci Mane song) =

2018 single by Gucci Mane featuring Migos and Lil Yachty

Single by Gucci Mane featuring Migos and Lil Yachty

from the album Evil Genius
- Released: March 2, 2018
- Genre: Hip hop; trap
- Length: 2:16
- Label: Guwop; Atlantic
- Songwriters: Radric Davis; Quavious Marshall; Kirshnik Ball; Miles McCollum; Daryl McPherson; Grant Dickinson
- Producers: Da Honorable C.N.O.T.E.; DJ Durel; Quavo; Lab Cook

Gucci Mane singles chronology
"Cocky" (2018)	"Solitaire" (2018)	"Body Guard" (2018)

Migos singles chronology
"Walk It Talk It" (2018)	"Solitaire" (2018)	"Migo Pablo" (2018)

Lil Yachty singles chronology
"Worry No More" (2018)	"Solitaire" (2018)	"Different Colors" (2018)

Music video
- "Solitaire" on YouTube

"Solitaire" is a song by American rapper Gucci Mane featuring American hip-hop group Migos and fellow American rapper Lil Yachty, released on March 2, 2018 as the lead single from the former's twelfth studio album Evil Genius (2018). The song was produced by Da Honorable C.N.O.T.E., DJ Durel, Quavo of Migos, and Lab Cook.

== Composition ==
"Solitaire" is a trap song that features an "electronic-sounding instrumental reminiscent of an '80s video game". In it, Gucci Mane raps about his lifestyle and compares it to his past life, also mentioning in the chorus playing solitaire in a prison cell when he was incarcerated. The rappers center on their money and jewelry in the song.

== Music video ==
A music video for the song was released on May 22, 2018. Directed by Clifton Bell, it sees the rappers showing their jewelry as they rap in a room resembling the inside of a diamond, while a trio of women puff on vape pens.

== Charts ==
Chart (2018)	Peak position
US Bubbling Under Hot 100 (Billboard)	8
