= Please Me =

2019 single by Cardi B and Bruno Mars

Single by Cardi B and Bruno Mars
- Released: February 15, 2019
- Genre: R&B; Hip-hop; soul
- Length: 3:20
- Label: Atlantic
- Songwriters: Belcalis Almanzar; Bruno Mars; James Fauntleroy; Jonathan Yip; Ray Romulus; Jeremy Reeves; Ray McCullough II
- Producers: Bruno Mars; The Stereotypes

Cardi B singles chronology
"Twerk" (2019)	"Please Me" (2019)	"Clout" (2019)

Bruno Mars singles chronology
"Wake Up in the Sky" (2018)	"Please Me" (2019)	"Blow" (2019)

Music video
- "Please Me" on YouTube

"Please Me" is a song by American rapper Cardi B and American singer-songwriter Bruno Mars, released as a single by Atlantic Records on February 15, 2019. The song was included on a digital reissue of her second studio album Am I the Drama? (2025). It was written by the artists alongside James Fauntleroy and The Stereotypes—collectively Jonathan Yip, Ray Romulus, Jeremy Reeves, and Ray McCullough II, who also produced the song with Mars. "Please Me" is an R&B, hip-hop and soul ballad that is reminiscent of the 1990s R&B with "trap stylings"; its lyrics are about two lovers flirting with each other and the way their night will proceed before they go into a bedroom.

Music critics gave "Please Me" mostly positive reviews and praised Cardi B's presence and verses on the track, as well as Mars' vocals. They also said the song is ideal for Valentine's Day. "Please Me" peaked at number three on the US Billboard Hot 100 chart and was certified triple platinum by the Recording Industry Association of America (RIAA) and Music Canada (MC). It peaked at number one on the US Hot R&B/Hip-Hop Songs and Rhythmic charts, and on the Chile General Monitor Latino chart. It also entered the top 20 in Canada, Greece, New Zealand and the United Kingdom.

Mars and Florent Dechard directed the song's music video, in which Mars and Cardi B meet after a party, perform suggestive dance moves and ride around Los Angeles. Cardi B performed the song live at the Houston Livestock Show and Rodeo on March 1, 2019, while Mars performed it as a medley with different songs on his shows of Bruno Mars Live (2022–2024). "Please Me" was nominated for several awards, including Best Collaboration and Video of the Year at the BET Awards 2019, Best Pop Video at the 2019 MTV Video Music Awards and Best Collaboration Performance at the 2019 Soul Train Music Awards.

== Background and production ==
On February 10, 2019, Cardi B won the Grammy Award for Best Rap Album for her debut studio album Invasion of Privacy (2018) at the 61st Annual Grammy Awards. On the same date, after receiving criticism on social media due to her win at the ceremony, the rapper deactivated her Instagram account due to the frustration this caused. Cardi B returned to the platform on February 13 to announce a new song she recorded with American singer-songwriter Bruno Mars would be released on the following Friday. "Please Me" is their second collaboration after Cardi B's remix of Mars's single "Finesse" (2018). Cardi B shared the song's cover art on her Instagram account.

Atlantic Records released "Please Me" for digital download and streaming on February 15, 2019, and issued the song to American contemporary hit radio and rhythmic contemporary stations the same day. On the same date, Warner Music Group (WMG) issued the track for radio airplay in Italy. BBC Radio 1Xtra began adding the song onto their playlists on February 15, 2019. On February 19, 2019, the single was re-released to contemporary hit radio. The song was included on the "Bardi Gang Edition" of Cardi B's second studio album Am I the Drama? (2025), available as a limited-time digital download on September 25, 2025. It was later included on the "Ultimate Edition" of the album, released for digital download and streaming on November 12, 2025. The song was also included on Mars's first compilation album, Collaborations (2026).

"Please Me" was written by Cardi B, Bruno Mars, James Fauntleroy and The Stereotypes—collectively Jonathan Yip, Ray Romulus, Jeremy Reeves and Ray McCullough II, who with Mars co-produced and programmed the song. Mars and Christopher Brody Brown played guitar and keytar, and Byron "Mr. Talkbox" Chambers provided additional background vocals. "Please Me" was engineered by Charles Moniz, mixed by Serban Ghenea with John Hanes serving as a mixing engineer. It was mastered by Randy Merrill.

== Composition ==
"Please Me"
A 20-second sample of the chorus where Mars sings the R&B hook begging for sexual pleasure as Cardi B shouts "Let me hear you say"

"Please Me" is an R&B, hip-hop and soul ballad that has a "mid-tempo retro groove" with a "burbling synthesizer bass" in its instrumentation. The song is composed in the key of F minor at a tempo of 68 beats per minute. Mars and Cardi B's vocals range between the notes of E♯_{3} and E♯_{5}. The song has a chord progression of Bm7–C♯7(♯5b9)–E/F♯–F♯7(b9). "Please Me" is a "silky, flirty slow jam" that resembles "steamy 90s' RnB". NME's Rhian Daly stated it is "a mix of modern and classic – a smooth slow jam with trap stylings". Mars's vocals are described as "silky and begging" while Cardi B's show "confident rapping".

"Please Me" starts with two "pulsing bass notes" and Cardi B saying "Uh" and "C'mon". It leads to "a disco-style bassline" before beginning the "chord loop" that is present during the song. At this point, Mars's "backward-processed" vocals create "a ramp effect" to start the duet. It is followed by the chorus and its "four-chord loop", which is influenced by pop, trap and R&B/soul. The "jazzier chord extensions" are similar to those used by the "romantic 90s artists". The first half of the chorus features a hi-hat, a handclap, a saw-wave synth, a soft pad sound and an echo effect on the keyboard. The chorus starts slowly and increases in intensity when Mars's vocals are accompanied by the bassline and back-up harmony. For the most part, Cardi B's rap follows the song's tempo, except on the second and third lines, where "her intense rhythmic style" appears. At this point, the tenor background vocals disappear, enhancing the drum programming. The hi-hats give "motion" to Cardi B's rapping and there is a "plink" sound that "repeats on the beat".

The pre-chorus has Cardi B and Mars explain their intentions. The bass again disappears in the first half of the second chorus and a synth with echoes continues through the rest of the chorus as the backup vocals harmonize. The previous bassline is present in Cardi B's second section but the vocal harmonies are absent. During the rap portions, the overdubs "overlap with the main vocal". On the pre-chorus, Cardi B's vocals are split into harmonies and Mars's vocals on the background are foregrounded. Afterwards, Cardi B raps a single bar over an 1980s-style synth chord "before the drums and backing vocals" emerge, increasing "the energy levels" on the bridge. The latter features new harmonic rhythm and chords with "tension-building" as Mars's reaches his "highest pitched notes". Then, Cardi B performs a rap breakdown that features only a "synth line and lo-fi drums". The last chorus begins with a bassline and "finger-clicks", after which the full instrumental comes back and Mars reaches a "high note".

It was first thought "Please Me" samples Jodeci's "Freek'n You" (1995) but Time magazine later confirmed it does not sample that song. Cardi B, however, references the 1990s R&B artist Jodeci in her verses. Bethy Squires from Vulture said "Please Me" is reminiscent of "the R&B fuck jams of the mid-90s" and compared it to an upbeat version of "Red Light Special" (1995) by TLC. Some publications compared the song's style to that of Mars's and Cardi B's previous collaboration "Finesse" (2018). Other publications, however, said the songs are quite different, and that "Please Me" has a slower tempo and is more "sexy". MTV News' Trey Alston called the track a "sexy spiritual sequel" of "Finesse" that deals in terms of lust. Maeve McDermott writing for USA Today said its R&B style is closer to "Mars' brand of smooth love songs than Cardi's bawdier anthems".

The lyrics of "Please Me" concern sexual pleasure and desire. Cardi B and Mars flirt with each other; Mars is "pleading for some loving" and Cardi B answers with the desire of "getting down on the dancefloor before taking it to another level". Sesali Bowen of Nylon said Cardi B slows "her flow as Bruno taps into the classic R&B tradition of 'begging for pussy' ". First, Cardi B teases Mars "with her moves and figure", leaving him "on the receiving end of this sexual punishment", driving him crazy with anticipation of intimacy. Cardi B describes her next move, which starts with "twerkin' in some J's on the dancefloor" and deciding if he will "sample what's on the chef's menu" as "Mars pleads for carnal activity". During her second verse, Cardi B "honors her Hispanic roots" and shows her sexual dominance, saying; "Your pussy basura / My pussy horchata", using the Spanish words for "trash and the sweet", respectively. In the end of the song, Mars is begging and "Cardi is more than willing to oblige".

== Critical reception ==
"Please Me" received mostly positive reviews from music critics. Claire Rowden of MTV praised the collaboration; she called Mars's vocals "sweet and charming" and Cardi B's verses "heated and fiery". Mike Nied writing for Idolator called the song "a sensual bop" and said Mars "shows off his velvety vocals on the seductive chorus" while Cardi B's verses are "self-assured and smooth". Time's Andrew Chow said "Please Me" shows "Cardi's elasticity in style and form" and her "unfettered, bombastic joy". Chow added while everyone expects "everything Cardi does to be a confrontation", she flirts on the track. Consequence of Sound's Lake Schatz praised Cardi B's rap verses, such as "Do my back like I do these records, break that shit". According to Colin Joyce of Vice and Liz Calvario of Entertainment Tonight the song is "perfect" for Valentine's Day. Joyce added "horny, performative..." Tara Martinez from Elite Daily said "Please Me" is "extremely suggestive" and "unapologetically sexy". Lucas Villa writing for AXS said "Cardi and Mars aim to please once again with this R&B throwback-styled romp". XXL's Tony Centeno called the track a "bedroom banger" and Cardi B's rap verses "extra raunchy".

Although Rhian Daly from NME did not consider "Please Me" to be Cardi B's best song because "she's far better when she's got some fire beneath her", Daly praised it by saying Cardi B "dominates" the track because most songs have "the man calling the shots". Daly also said Cardi B calls the shots "while making sure she's getting what she wants too". Daly said Mars's vocals show "sensual R&B" and that Cardi B's rapping is "something far more x-rated". Pitchfork's Michelle Kim criticized "Please Me", saying Mars "attempts to make his own bump 'n' grind anthem" but that "his request feels painfully safe and vanilla, like if a bot was programmed to write sexts". Kim also said the song has an "awkward tempo" and is "definitely not sexy enough to be played in the bedroom".

=== Accolades ===
In 2019, "Please Me" was nominated for Best Collaboration at the BET Awards 2019; Best Collab, Duo or Group at the 2019 BET Hip Hop Awards; and Best Collaboration Performance at the 2019 Soul Train Music Awards. In 2020, "Please Me" received two awards from ASCAP—one from the Pop Music Awards because it was one of the winners of Most Performed Song and another from the Rhythm & Soul Music Awards as one of the receivers of Winning R&B/Hip-Hop Songs. The track also won a BMI R&B/Hip-Hop Awards at the BMI Awards.

== Commercial performance ==
In the United States, "Please Me" debuted at number five on the US Billboard Hot 100 with 51,000 downloads and debuted at number-one on Digital Songs chart with 27.9 million streams and 39 million radio impressions in its first full tracking week. It became Cardi B's seventh and Mars's sixteenth top ten on the Hot 100 chart. On its third week on the chart, following the release of its official music video on March 1, 2019, the single reached its peak of number three on the Billboard Hot 100. It sold 20,000 copies with 52.9 million radio impressions and 45.3 million streams. "Please Me" also peaked at number one on the Billboard Hot R&B/Hip-Hop Songs and Rhythmic charts, becoming Cardi B's and Mars's second collaboration to do so after the remix of Mars's song "Finesse" (2018). It became Cardi B's fourth and sixth number one on the former and latter chart, respectively; it also became Mars's third and eleventh number one on the Billboard Hot R&B/Hip-Hop Song and Rhythmic chart, respectively. The Recording Industry Association of America (RIAA) certified the song three times platinum. In Canada, "Please Me" peaked at number 12 on the Canadian Hot 100 and was certified triple platinum by Music Canada (MC).

In the United Kingdom, "Please Me" debuted at its peak of number 12 on the UK Singles Chart on February 22, 2019. The British Phonographic Industry (BPI) certified the track platinum for sales and streams over 600,000 certified units. The single peaked at number 15 in Croatia and reached number 14 on its second week on the IFPI Greece chart. It also debuted at its peak of number 12 in the Lithuanian Top 100. "Please Me" reached number one on the Chile General Monitor Latino chart and peaked at number two on the Peru Anglo Monitor Latino. The song entered at number 19 on the New Zealand Singles Chart and peaked at number 12, spending eight weeks on the chart. It also peaked at number 18 on the Lebanese Top 20 chart.

== Music video ==
=== Background ===
After releasing "Please Me" on February 15, 2019, Cardi B promised her fans a music video would be released soon. On March 1 that year, Cardi B made a video announcement, stating "she really loved what they did for this video" and "I really just wanted to do a video because I'm really feelin' myself". The accompanying music video was filmed in Los Angeles and premiered at 10 a.m. EST on March 1. It was directed by Florent Dechard and Mars, and was choreographed by Mars, Tanisha Scott and Phil Tayag. In the music video, Cardi B wears a purple leather jacket with fringe and a bustier; the look was inspired by Selena's during her 1993 performance at the Memorial Coliseum in Corpus Christi, Texas, the cover of the album Selena Live! (1993) and her wax figure at Madame Tussauds Hollywood.

=== Synopsis ===
The music video starts with a message that sets the location at Los Angeles, California, after a party at a taco restaurant. In the "neon-lit" music video Mars, wearing a pencil-thin mustache, is sitting with his friends eating tacos when Cardi B, holding a lollipop, enters the restaurant with her friends. Cardi B says she "should've slapped that bitch", who was talking "wild crazy", referencing an earlier incident. At this point, Cardi B and Mars exchange glances while the socialize with their respective groups of friends; nothing moves and "then the beat drops". Then, Cardi B and her four friends dance to draw the attention of Mars and his friends. Afterwards, Mars and Cardi B approach one another and perform several "suggestive dances and scenarios"; Cardi B is "twerking on the store counter, grinding on Mars, and sitting atop a slushy machine". Mars and his friends also dance to impress Cardi B and her friends. They leave the restaurant and enter an abandoned warehouse, where Cardi B and Mars kiss passionately on the hood of Cardi B's car before they get into different classic cars. In the final scene, the two groups socialize together as Cardi B and Mars sing to each other on their respective cars while driving through a tunnel.

=== Reception ===
Matt Miller from Esquire said the video is an homage to the artists' Latin "heritage and late nights in the '90s", and concluded they "have struck gold in the '90s". NPR's, Joshua Bote said Cardi B and Mars "bask in the early '90s glow of the time when Jodeci, low-riders and pencil 'staches reigned supreme. It's Saved by the Bell with a dash of Chicano-charmed spice." Bowen of Nylon praised the video, saying "the visuals are colorful and playful, but still very sexy". Vibe's J'na Jefferson called the music video "sexy", and said "Cardi B and Bruno Mars get up close and personal". Dave Quinn writing for People said "it's an electrifying video, with Cardi and Mars's chemistry off the charts". Christian Holub of Entertainment Weekly compared the music video of "Please Me" to that of "Finesse" due to its "colorful and action-packed" set. Idolator's Nied called the it vibrant and lively affair. Martinez from Elite Daily called the video "unapologetically sexy" and said it was "the sexiest video I've seen in a long time".

Lake Schatz of Consequence of Sound, Evan Minsker of Pitchfork and Elizabeth Aubrey of NME all found the video to be "stylish". According to Ron Diker writing for HuffPost, "things get spicy in a hurry" in the music video and the lyrics, along with the "twerking and suggestive moves", are anything but subtle. Elyse Dupre from E! Online called the video "steamy". Colin Joyce of Vice said the video highlights the song's attributes and said it is "like watching two theater kids dance up on each other. It's maybe just a little too sincere in its horniness." In 2019, the music video received a nomination for Best Pop Video at the 2019 MTV Video Music Awards and Video of the Year at the BET Awards 2019.

== Live performances ==
Cardi B performed the song live at the Houston Livestock Show and Rodeo on March 1, 2019, while Mars performed "Please Me" as a medley with "That's What I Like" and "Wake Up in the Sky" on his shows of Bruno Mars Live (2022–2024). Starting on October 4, 2024, the medley only included "That's What I Like" and "Please Me".

== Personnel ==
Credits adapted from the liner notes of Collaborations.

- Cardi B – songwriting
- Bruno Mars – songwriting, production, guitar, keytar, programming
- The Stereotypes – production, programming, songwriting
- James Fauntleroy – songwriting
- Christopher Brody Brown – guitar, keytar
- Byron "Mr. Talkbox" Chambers – additional background vocals
- Charles Moniz – engineering
- John Hanes – mix engineering
- Serban Ghenea – mixing
- Randy Merrill – mastering

== Charts ==
=== Weekly charts ===
List of chart positions
Chart (2019)	Peak position
Argentina Anglo (Monitor Latino)	9
Australia (ARIA)	22
Belgium (Ultratip Bubbling Under Flanders)	6
Belgium (Ultratip Bubbling Under Wallonia)	2
Bolivia (Monitor Latino)	16
Brazil (Top 100 Brasil)	80
Canada Hot 100 (Billboard)	12
Canada CHR/Top 40 (Billboard)	19
Canada Hot AC (Billboard)	40
Chile General (Monitor Latino)	1
China Airplay/FL (Billboard)	22
Colombia (National-Report)	40
Croatia (HRT)	15
Czech Republic Airplay (ČNS IFPI)	44
Czech Republic Singles Digital (ČNS IFPI)	56
Denmark (Tracklisten)	37
Euro Digital Song Sales (Billboard)	13
Estonia (Eesti Ekspress)	30
France (SNEP)	116
Germany (GfK)	83
Greece (IFPI)	14
Hungary (Single Top 40)	22
Hungary (Stream Top 40)	25
Ireland (IRMA)	21
Japan Hot 100 (Billboard)	32
Latvia (LAIPA)	27
Lebanon (Lebanese Top 20)	18
Lithuania (AGATA)	12
Mexico (Billboard Ingles Airplay)	40
Netherlands (Dutch Tipparade)	3
Netherlands (Single Top 100)	73
New Zealand (Recorded Music NZ)	12
Peru Anglo (Monitor Latino)	2
Portugal (AFP)	35
Romania (Airplay 100)	69
Scottish Singles Sales (Official Charts)	26
Singapore (RIAS)	23
Slovakia Singles Digital (ČNS IFPI)	25
Spain (Promusicae)	94
Sweden (Sverigetopplistan)	74
Switzerland (Schweizer Hitparade)	57
UK Singles (Official Charts)	12
UK Hip Hop/R&B (Official Charts)	5
US Billboard Hot 100	3
US Adult Pop Airplay (Billboard)	37
US Dance Club Songs (Billboard)	42
US Dance Airplay (Billboard)	24
US Hot R&B/Hip-Hop Songs (Billboard)	1
US Pop Airplay (Billboard)	14
US Rhythmic Airplay (Billboard)	1

=== Year-end charts ===
List of chart positions
Chart (2019)	Position
El Salvador (Monitor Latino)	69
Honduras (Monitor Latino)	86
US Billboard Hot 100	37
US Hot R&B/Hip-Hop Songs (Billboard)	17
US Rhythmic (Billboard)	23
US Rolling Stone Top 100	69

== Certifications ==
List of certifications
Region	Certification	Certified units/sales
Australia (ARIA)	3× Platinum	210,000^{‡}
Canada (Music Canada)	3× Platinum	240,000^{‡}
France (SNEP)	Gold	100,000^{‡}
New Zealand (RMNZ)	2× Platinum	60,000^{‡}
Portugal (AFP)	Gold	5,000^{‡}
United Kingdom (BPI)	Platinum	600,000^{‡}
United States (RIAA)	3× Platinum	3,000,000^{‡}
^{‡} Sales+streaming figures based on certification alone.

== Release history ==
List of release history, showing region(s), date(s), format(s) and label(s)
Region	Date	Format	Label	Ref.
Various	February 15, 2019	Digital download; streaming	Atlantic	
Italy	February 15, 2019	Radio airplay	Warner	
United States	February 15, 2019	Rhythmic contemporary	Atlantic	
United States	February 19, 2019	Contemporary hit radio	Atlantic	
