= Bruno Mars Live =

2022–2024 concert tour

- Promotional tour by Bruno Mars
- Example promotional poster
- Location: Asia; North America; Oceania; South America
- Start date: October 14, 2022
- End date: November 5, 2024
- No. of shows: 59
- Attendance: 2,497,449 tickets
- Box office: $312,801,742
- Website: https://www.brunomars.com/tour

Bruno Mars concert chronology
- An Evening with Silk Sonic at Park MGM (2022); Bruno Mars Live (2022–2024); The Romantic Tour (2026–2027)

American singer-songwriter Bruno Mars embarked on a promotional concert tour across Australia, Asia, North America, and South America from 2022 to 2024. The tour spanned 59 dates in 16 countries, beginning on October 14, 2022, in Sydney, Australia, and concluding on November 5, 2024, in Belo Horizonte, Brazil. Loosely grouped under the title Bruno Mars Live, the singer performed 43 reported shows under the banner, which collectively sold nearly two million tickets.

== Background ==
Mars announced several international shows separately between 2022 and 2024. The Sydney shows were announced in August 2022, the Osaka and 2022 Tokyo shows were announced in September 2022, the Seoul and Bulacan shows were announced in April 2023, the Tbilisi and Tel Aviv shows were announced in June 2023, the 2024 Tokyo shows were announced in July 2023, the AlUla show was announced in September 2023, the Bangkok and Singapore shows were announced in January 2024, the Inglewood shows were announced in April 2024, to commemorate the opening of the Intuit Dome, and the Kaohsiung, Jakarta and Kuala Lumpur shows were announced in June 2024. All shows except the Inglewood dates were held at stadiums or similarly sized venues.

Mars also continued to perform concerts for his Bruno Mars at Park MGM residency in Las Vegas during the tour. The 115 reported residency shows sold 2,218,000 tickets and grossed $359.8 million.

Mars performed in Tel Aviv on October 4, 2023. A second show, scheduled for October 7, was canceled because of the Hamas-led attack on Israel that occurred that day.

In 2023, Mars achieved the highest-grossing concerts by an international artist in South Korean history, grossing $5.572 million each night at Olympic Stadium in Seoul on June 17 and 18.

As of 2024, Mars held the largest box office report for Tokyo Dome, grossing $43.5 million from 322,000 tickets sold for shows in Tokyo from January 11 to 21.

As of 2025, Mars had performed 29 concerts in Asia on the tour. Those shows sold 1,301,445 tickets, or 98.58% of available capacity, and grossed $179,140,000.

He also held the largest box office report in Indonesian history, grossing $21.5 million from 142,000 tickets sold across three shows at Jakarta International Stadium. The tour is the second-highest-grossing tour by a Western artist in Asian history, with $179.1 million from 29 shows, behind only Coldplay's Music of the Spheres World Tour.

Bruno Mars Live grossed $312,801,742 and sold 2,497,449 tickets. It became Mars's second tour to gross more than $300 million in ticket sales, doing so across 54 shows. The year 2024 was the most successful calendar year of Mars's touring career, with $280.1 million grossed from 1,986,709 tickets sold across 60 shows.

=== 2024 Brazilian leg ===
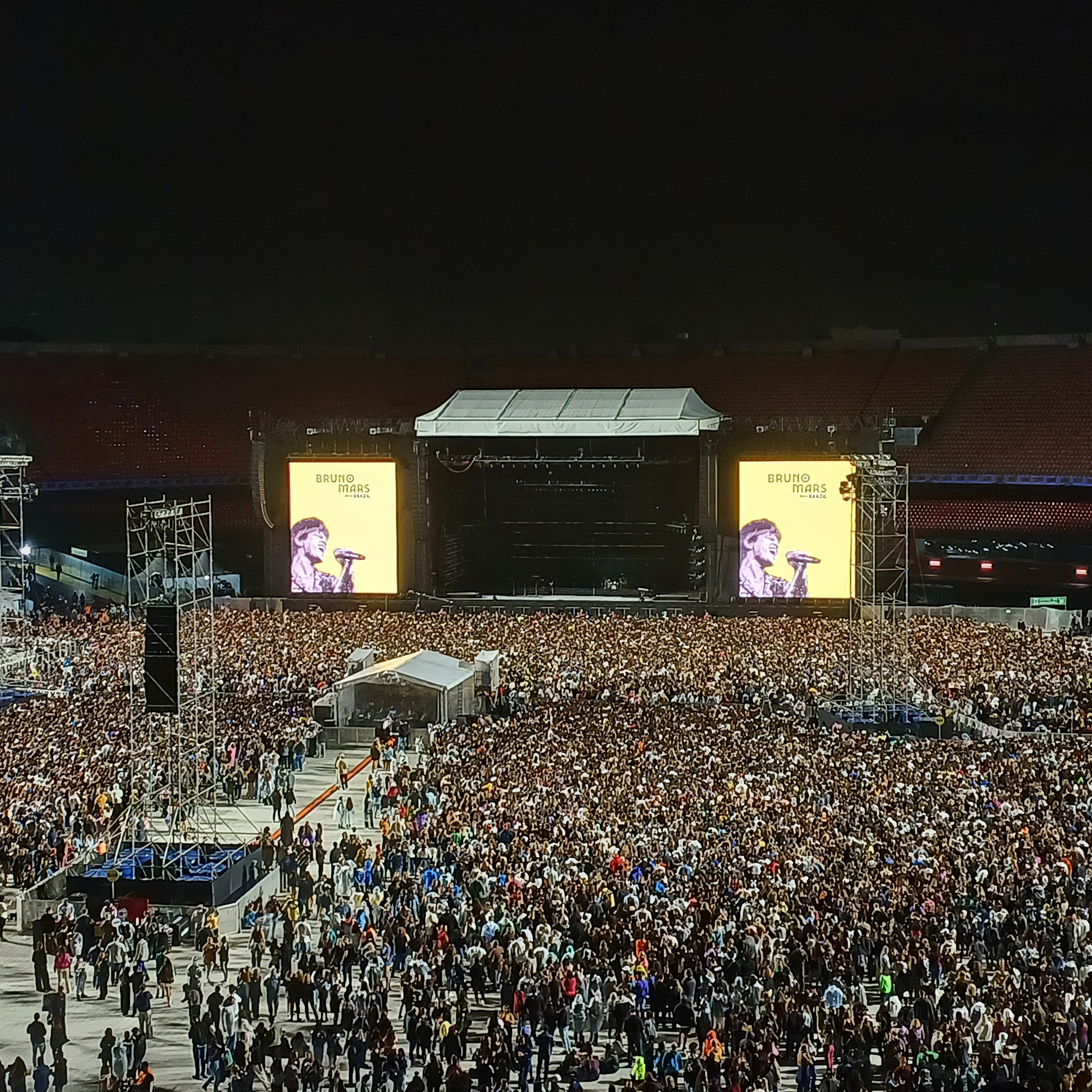
Mars on stage in São Paulo during the tour's Brazilian leg in 2024

After two performances at The Town festival in São Paulo, Brazil, in September 2023, and after recording an exclusive video thanking Brazilian fans titled "Come to Brasil", Mars announced a Brazilian leg of the tour.

On May 2, Live Nation officially announced the performances on its social media accounts. Four shows were initially announced: October 4 in Rio de Janeiro, October 8 and 9 in São Paulo, and October 17 in Brasília. Due to high demand, all four shows sold out in less than one hour, leading the promoter to announce four additional performances: October 5 in Rio de Janeiro, October 12 and 13 in São Paulo, and October 18 in Brasília.

On September 27, as part of the tour celebrations in Brazil, Mars released his first compilation on streaming services, titled Bruno Mars Favoritas Da Tour 2024 Brasil. The compilation includes 28 songs, including selections from the concert set list. The Brazilian leg ultimately included 14 dates across five cities, along with a benefit show on October 1. It became the biggest tour by an international artist in Brazil. The previous record was held by Mexican pop group RBD, which performed 13 shows on the Tour Generación RBD in 2006. Mars broke the record with 14 shows.

Mars earned his highest-grossing Latin American concert on October 1, 2024, with $7.054 million at Estádio do Morumbi in São Paulo. The Brazilian leg became the highest-grossing tour in Brazilian history, grossing $85 million from 817,000 tickets sold across 14 shows. It also produced the largest box office report in Brazilian history, with $42.3 million from 404,000 tickets sold across six shows at Estádio do Morumbi as part of Bruno Mars Live.

== Set list ==
The following set list is from the October 14, 2022, show in Sydney. It is not representative of every concert on the tour.

1. "Moonshine"
2. "24K Magic"
3. "Finesse"
4. "Treasure" / "Liquor Store Blues"
5. "Perm"
6. "Billionaire"
7. "That's What I Like" / "Wake Up in the Sky" / "Please Me"
8. "Versace on the Floor"
9. "How Deep Is Your Love"
10. "Marry You"
11. "Runaway Baby"
12. "Fuck You" / "Young, Wild & Free" / "Talking to the Moon" / "Nothin' on You" / "Smokin Out the Window" / "Leave the Door Open"
13. "When I Was Your Man"
14. "Grenade"
15. "Locked Out of Heaven"
16. "Just the Way You Are"

Encore

17. "Uptown Funk"

=== Notes ===
- Starting on October 4, 2024, "Calling All My Lovelies" and "It Will Rain" was added to the set list, along with samples of "Gorilla" and "Wake Up in the Sky".
- Lady Gaga joined Mars to perform Die with a Smile on August 15 and 16 in 2024 in Inglewood and from September 7, 2024 in Kaohsiung Mars began performing the song live on his own.
- During Mars's shows in Brazil, "Perm" also featured samples of "Bonde do Brunão".
- On October 9, 2024, Brazilian singer Thiaguinho made a special appearance to sing "Cheia de Manias".
- During the final concert in São Paulo, Brazilian sertanejo duo Chitãozinho & Xororó made a special appearance to sing "Evidências".
- Starting on October 26, 2024, a tribute to the late singer Marília Mendonça was played as an interlude.
- During the Tokyo Dome performances in January 2024, he performed a brief cover of "Heavy Rotation" (originally by AKB48) inserted into his performance of "Marry You" at several shows.

== Tour dates ==
List of 2022 concerts
Date (2022)	City	Country	Venue	Attendance	Revenue
October 14, 2022	Sydney	Australia	Allianz Stadium	70,387 / 70,387	$10,196,439
October 15, 2022	Sydney	Australia	Allianz Stadium	70,387 / 70,387	$10,196,439
October 22, 2022	Osaka	Japan	Kyocera Dome	74,000 / 74,000	$9,893,711
October 23, 2022	Osaka	Japan	Kyocera Dome	74,000 / 74,000	$9,893,711
October 26, 2022	Tokyo	Japan	Tokyo Dome	142,000 / 142,000	$18,285,015
October 27, 2022	Tokyo	Japan	Tokyo Dome	142,000 / 142,000	$18,285,015
October 30, 2022	Tokyo	Japan	Tokyo Dome	142,000 / 142,000	$18,285,015
November 28, 2022	Sakhir	Bahrain	Al-Dana Amphitheatre	9,918 / 9,918	$2,553,976
December 3, 2022	Riyadh	Saudi Arabia	Banban Desert	—N/a	—N/a

List of 2023 concerts
Date (2023)	City	Country	Venue	Attendance	Revenue
June 17, 2023	Seoul	South Korea	Seoul Olympic Stadium	100,339 / 100,339	$11,135,369
June 18, 2023	Seoul	South Korea	Seoul Olympic Stadium	100,339 / 100,339	$11,135,369
June 24, 2023	Santa Maria	Philippines	Philippine Arena	76,252 / 76,252	$10,377,192
June 25, 2023	Santa Maria	Philippines	Philippine Arena	76,252 / 76,252	$10,377,192
September 3, 2023 (Note: Part of The Town.)	São Paulo	Brazil	Interlagos Circuit	—N/a	—N/a
September 6, 2023	Santiago	Chile	Estadio Monumental	44,376 / 44,376	$5,490,068
September 10, 2023	São Paulo	Brazil	Interlagos Circuit	—N/a	—N/a
September 29, 2023 (Note: The show at Azimuth Canyon was not part of the tour, but of the "AlUla Moments" Concert Series. Its attendance and revenue were not included in the total.)	AlUla	Saudi Arabia	Azimuth Canyon	—N/a	—N/a
October 1, 2023	Tbilisi	Georgia	Boris Paichadze Dinamo Arena	48,843 / 48,843	$4,227,415
October 4, 2023	Tel Aviv	Israel	Yarkon Park	56,755 / 56,755	$6,516,580
December 7, 2023	Hollywood	United States	Hard Rock Live	12,992 / 12,992	$3,903,628
December 8, 2023	Hollywood	United States	Hard Rock Live	12,992 / 12,992	$3,903,628

List of 2024 concerts
Date (2024)	City	Country	Venue	Attendance	Revenue
January 11, 2024	Tokyo	Japan	Tokyo Dome	322,000 / 322,000	$43,500,000
January 13, 2024	Tokyo	Japan	Tokyo Dome	322,000 / 322,000	$43,500,000
January 14, 2024	Tokyo	Japan	Tokyo Dome	322,000 / 322,000	$43,500,000
January 16, 2024	Tokyo	Japan	Tokyo Dome	322,000 / 322,000	$43,500,000
January 18, 2024	Tokyo	Japan	Tokyo Dome	322,000 / 322,000	$43,500,000
January 20, 2024	Tokyo	Japan	Tokyo Dome	322,000 / 322,000	$43,500,000
January 21, 2024	Tokyo	Japan	Tokyo Dome	322,000 / 322,000	$43,500,000
March 30, 2024	Bangkok	Thailand	Rajamangala Stadium	74,099 / 86,071	$12,012,438
March 31, 2024	Bangkok	Thailand	Rajamangala Stadium	74,099 / 86,071	$12,012,438
April 3, 2024	Singapore		Singapore National Stadium	147,911 / 148,059	$23,152,809
April 5, 2024	Singapore		Singapore National Stadium	147,911 / 148,059	$23,152,809
April 6, 2024	Singapore		Singapore National Stadium	147,911 / 148,059	$23,152,809
August 8, 2024	Mexico City	Mexico	Estadio GNP Seguros	174,000 / 174,000	$18,900,000
August 10, 2024	Mexico City	Mexico	Estadio GNP Seguros	174,000 / 174,000	$18,900,000
August 11, 2024	Mexico City	Mexico	Estadio GNP Seguros	174,000 / 174,000	$18,900,000
August 15, 2024	Inglewood	United States	Intuit Dome	26,648 / 26,648	$6,727,495
August 16, 2024	Inglewood	United States	Intuit Dome	26,648 / 26,648	$6,727,495
September 7, 2024	Kaohsiung	Taiwan	Kaohsiung National Stadium	110,225 / 110,225	$13,833,890
September 8, 2024	Kaohsiung	Taiwan	Kaohsiung National Stadium	110,225 / 110,225	$13,833,890
September 11, 2024	Jakarta	Indonesia	Jakarta International Stadium	142,119 / 145,108	$21,500,000
September 13, 2024	Jakarta	Indonesia	Jakarta International Stadium	142,119 / 145,108	$21,500,000
September 14, 2024	Jakarta	Indonesia	Jakarta International Stadium	142,119 / 145,108	$21,500,000
September 17, 2024	Kuala Lumpur	Malaysia	National Stadium Bukit Jalil	49,827 / 53,497	$6,381,675
October 1, 2024 (Note: Charity concert sponsored by Budweiser Brasil to help victims of the 2024 Rio Grande do Sul floods.)	São Paulo	Brazil	Tokio Marine Hall	—N/a	—N/a
October 4, 2024	São Paulo	Brazil	Estádio MorumBIS	403,619 / 403,619	$42,324,560
October 5, 2024	São Paulo	Brazil	Estádio MorumBIS	403,619 / 403,619	$42,324,560
October 8, 2024	São Paulo	Brazil	Estádio MorumBIS	403,619 / 403,619	$42,324,560
October 9, 2024	São Paulo	Brazil	Estádio MorumBIS	403,619 / 403,619	$42,324,560
October 12, 2024	São Paulo	Brazil	Estádio MorumBIS	403,619 / 403,619	$42,324,560
October 13, 2024	São Paulo	Brazil	Estádio MorumBIS	403,619 / 403,619	$42,324,560
October 16, 2024	Rio de Janeiro	Brazil	Estádio Olímpico Nilton Santos	195,776 / 195,776	$17,375,840
October 19, 2024	Rio de Janeiro	Brazil	Estádio Olímpico Nilton Santos	195,776 / 195,776	$17,375,840
October 20, 2024	Rio de Janeiro	Brazil	Estádio Olímpico Nilton Santos	195,776 / 195,776	$17,375,840
October 26, 2024	Brasília	Brazil	Arena BRB	91,767 / 91,767	$11,156,115
October 27, 2024	Brasília	Brazil	Arena BRB	91,767 / 91,767	$11,156,115
October 31, 2024	Curitiba	Brazil	Estádio Couto Pereira	72,427 / 72,427	$8,378,689
November 1, 2024	Curitiba	Brazil	Estádio Couto Pereira	72,427 / 72,427	$8,378,689
November 5, 2024	Belo Horizonte	Brazil	Estádio Mineirão	53,327 / 53,327	$5,813,262
Total				2,497,449 / 2,518,386	$313,636,166 (Note: The listed total ($312,801,742) differs slightly from the sum of individual show revenues ($313,636,166), which may reflect reporting estimates.)

=== Canceled shows ===
List of canceled concerts
Date	City	Country	Venue	Reason	Ref.
October 7, 2023	Tel Aviv	Israel	Yarkon Park	October 7 attacks	

== Personnel ==
The Hooligans

- Bruno Mars – vocals
- Philip Lawrence – backup vocals
- Jamareo Artis – bass guitar
- Eric Hernandez – drums
- Kameron Whalum – trombone and backup vocals
- Dwayne Dugger – saxophone and keyboard
- James King – trumpet and backup vocals
- John Fossitt – keyboards
- Luke Kennedy Aiono – guitar

== See also ==
- List of highest-grossing concert series at a single venue
- List of most-attended concert series at a single venue
