= Liquor Store Blues =

Song by Bruno Mars

Promotional single by Bruno Mars featuring Damian Marley

from the album Doo-Wops & Hooligans
- Released: September 21, 2010
- Genre: Reggae
- Length: 3:49
- Label: Elektra; WEG
- Songwriters: Bruno Mars; Philip Lawrence; Ari Levine; Dwayne Chin-Quee; Mitchum Chin; Damian Marley; Thomas Pentz
- Producers: The Smeezingtons; Dwayne "Supa Dups" Chin-Quee

Music video
- "Liquor Store Blues" on YouTube

"Liquor Store Blues" is a song by American singer-songwriter Bruno Mars from his debut studio album Doo-Wops & Hooligans (2010), featuring Jamaican artist Damian Marley. It was released as the first promotional single from the record, on September 21, 2010, by Elektra Records. "Liquor Store Blues" is a reggae track with dub influences written by Mars, Phillip Lawrence, Ari Levine, Dwayne Chin-Quee, Mitchum Chin, Marley and Thomas Pentz. It was produced by the former three, under their alias, the Smeezingtons and Chin-Quee. Lyrically, the song addresses a way of avoiding problems by drinking hoping everything will be fine.

"Liquor Store Blues" received positive reviews from music critics, who praised Marley's appearance. The song peaked at number 97 on the Canadian Hot 100, number 20 on the Latin Pop Songs and was certified platinum by the Recording Industry Association of America (RIAA) and by Recorded Music NZ (RMNZ). The music video, directed by Jake Summer, features Mars and Marley singing together with a colorful background and "acid-trip" visual effects. It was nominated for International Video of the Year at the Danish GAFFA Awards. Mars performed "Liquor Store Blues" on several tours, such as The Doo-Wops & Hooligans Tour (2010–12) and Hooligans in Wondaland Tour (2011).

== Background and release ==
In an interview with Sound on Sound, Ari Levine said that the team, the Smeezingtons, never met Supa Dups personally and that "Liquor Store Blues" was finished by exchanging files of the song. The latter producer helped finishing the track by providing a dub sound, something the three of them "could just not nail it". During an interview granted to Vibe, Bruno Mars said that he never met Damian Marley, since the latter did "his part" after a show in Washington. Nevertheless, the singer explained how Marley was guested in the song:

I just wrote the song called "Liquor Store Blues". It had this reggae vibe...when I wrote, I was like, "Man, what if we could just get Damian on this?" So we [the Smeezingtons] made the phone call, and he came in with open arms and destroyed it.

On September 21, 2010, the song was released as the first promotional single as an iTunes Store-exclusive prior to Doo-Wops & Hooligans album release in October 2010, under Elektra Records. In the countries outside the United States, such as Germany, it was released under Warner Entertainment Group.

== Composition and production ==
"Liquor Store Blues"
A 21-second sample of the song where Mars sings over a reggae groove, accompanied by Marley's ad-libs

"Liquor Store Blues" is a reggae song with a "melodious boom-box midtempo". It is heavily influenced by dub music and borrowes "heavily from roots reggae". It has been compared to Travie McCoy and Mars's previous song "Billionaire" and the music of Sublime, Michael Jackson and Bedouin Soundclash. According to the digital sheet music the song was composed in common time and in the key of C♯ minor with a tempo of 144 beats per minute. Mars's and Marley's vocals range spans from the low note of G3 to the high note of C6.

The song's lyrics describe feelings of "pain" and "sorrow", using alcohol as a method to flee "bad fortune in an odd foreshadowing of events". In the end, hope is found by "getting messed up today" since on the following day everything will be fine. Tyrone S. Reid from the Seattle Post-Intelligencer said that the record explores addiction "wonderfully, if humorously" through the lyrics "I take one shot for my pain, one drag for my sorrow/Get messed up today, I’ll be okay tomorrow". Entertainment Weekly's, Brad Wete stated that Mars is about to "drown his sorrows in a tall glass of alcohol".

"Liquor Store Blues" was written by Mars, Philip Lawrence, Levine, Dwayne "Supa Dups" Chin-Quee, Mitchum Chin, Marley and Thomas Pentz and produced by the former three, under their alias, the Smeezingtons, and Chin-Quee. The latter was in charge of programming and arranging the drums, which he played. Chin played the guitar, bass, and keys. Levine engineered the song at Levcon Studios in California. The mixing was done at Larrabee Sound Studios in Los Angeles by Manny Marroquin, with Christian Plata and Erik Madrid as assistants. It was mastered by Stephen Marcussen at Marcussen Mastering in Hollywood, California.

== Critical reception ==
"Liquor Store Blues" received positive reviews by music critics. Tyrone S. Reid, considered the song one of the best in the album, "You simply can't get lyrics more droll or brainer than that." The addition of Damian Marley made the track "more alluring". DJ Gravy praised the fact that the song "has a more authentic yard vibe, thanks to Chiney's Supa Dups". The Scotsman said that Mars "strikes more of a downer note on simple confessional Liquor Store Blues with Marley providing a veneer of dub reggae credibility." Kevin Barber from the Consequence of Sound, praised Marley's feature on the song, "In return for all of his generous favors he has given other artists, they give back as well". When reviewing the album, Tony Clayton-Lea of The Irish Times put the recording on the download list.

Idolator's writer Robbie Daw shared a mixed opinion towards the song, "isn't nearly as infectious as "Just The Way You Are", [but] it should still make for a fairly decent album track". Andrew Winistorfer of Prefix Magazine criticized the singer, "Mars decided to try to carve off a chunk of Sublime's fans". He deemed the track "faux reggae".

== Commercial performance ==
After being released as a promotional single, "Liquor Store Blues", entered the Canadian Hot 100 at number 97. Around the same time, it failed to reach the Billboard Hot 100, however it entered the Bubbling Under Hot 100, which acts as an extension of the former chart, peaking at number 105. On October 22, 2010, the song entered and peaked at number 20 on the US Latin Pop Airplay, spending 7 weeks on the former chart. "Liquor Store Blues" was certified platinum by the Recording Industry Association of America (RIAA) and by Recorded Music NZ (RMNZ), as well as gold by Music Canada (MC). It also peaked at number 74 on the Romanian Top 100.

== Music video ==
=== Synopsis ===
The music video was directed by Jack Summer, and was premiered exclusive on March 3, 2011, for members of Mars's official website. The video features Bruno Mars and Damian Marley singing together in a psychedelic room with a colorful background and "acid-trip" visual effects. Thorough the clip "plumes of smoke" emerge in the screen in every direction with Marley "rapping about being "high as Superman" and shouting out pineapple kush", while Mars is upset about something. They both drown "their sorrows in the colorful visuals".

=== Reception ===
The video has been described as "psychedelic" and as an anthem to marijuana, rather than one about drunkenness. Wete explained that Mars was "ready to drown his sorrows in a tall glass of alcohol" and tipped "find out what concoction Mars and Marley are whipping up" by watching the clip. Winistorfer gave the video a harsh critic, he wrote that the smoke was not the only featured in the video as anyone "get to see Damian Marley sell out in real time". In 2011, the video was nominated for International Video of the Year at the Danish GAFFA Awards.

== Live performances and other media ==
Mars performed "Liquor Store Blues" on The Doo-Wops & Hooligans Tour (2010–2012) as the ninth track on the set list. An extended version of the song was performed as the tenth track during the Hooligans in Wondaland Tour (2011). During the 2016 Grammy Awards, Mars had a flask engraved with the lyrics, "One shot for my pain, one drag for my sorrow" from the song. In 2020, American singer-songwriter Raiche covered "Liquor Store Blues" as part of the tenth anniversary of Mars's debut album. Mars also performed the song during his shows of Bruno Mars Live (2022–2024) as a mashup with "Treasure".

== Personnel ==
Credits adapted from the liner notes of Doo-Wops & Hooligans.

Personnel

- Bruno Mars – lead vocals, songwriting
- Philip Lawrence – songwriting
- Ari Levine – songwriting, engineer
- The Smeezingtons – production
- Damian Marley – rapping, songwriting
- Dwayne "Supa Dups" Chin-Quee – production, songwriting, drums programming and arranging
- Thomas Pentz – songwriting
- Mitchum "Khan" Chin – songwriting, guitar, bass, keys
- Manny Marroquin – mixing
- Erik Madrid – mixing assistant
- Christian Plata – mixing assistant
- Stephen Marcussen – mastering

== Charts and certifications ==
=== Weekly charts ===
List of chart positions
Chart (2010)	Peak position
Canada Hot 100 (Billboard)	97
Romania (Romanian Top 100)	74
US Bubbling Under Hot 100 (Billboard)	5
US Digital Song Sales (Billboard)	68
US Latin Pop Airplay (Billboard)	20

=== Certifications ===
List of certifications
Region	Certification	Certified units/sales
Canada (Music Canada)	Gold	40,000^{‡}
New Zealand (RMNZ)	Platinum	30,000^{‡}
United States (RIAA)	Platinum	1,000,000^{‡}
^{‡} Sales+streaming figures based on certification alone.
