= Bonde do Brunão =

2025 song by Bruno Mars

Single by Bruno Mars
- Language: Portuguese
- Released: June 18, 2025
- Recorded: November 2024
- Genre: Brazilian funk
- Length: 0:57
- Label: The Smeezingtons; Atlantic
- Songwriters: Bruno Mars; Jeremy Reeves; Jonathan Yip; Ray Romulus
- Producers: Mars; The Stereotypes

Bruno Mars singles chronology
"Fat Juicy & Wet" (2025)	"Bonde do Brunão" (2025)	"I Just Might" (2026)

Music video
- "Bonde do Brunão" on YouTube

"Bonde do Brunão" is a song by American singer-songwriter Bruno Mars, released on June 18, 2025 by The Smeezingtons under exclusive license to Atlantic Records. It was recorded in November 2024, and was written by Mars alongside Jeremy Reeves, Jonathan Yip and Ray Romulus. It was produced by the former and the latter three as the Stereotypes, who also did programming.

The track was intended solely to promote the Brazil portion of the Bruno Mars Live tour, however, after it became the most watched video on his Instagram profile with 134 million views, Mars decided to officially release it. "Bonde do Brunão" is a Brazilian funk song performed in Portuguese. Lyrically, the song addresses Mars's arrival in Brazil and thanks Brazilian fans. The song not only pays homage to Brazil, but also draws inspiration and parodies "Cerol na Mão" (2001) by Bonde do Tigrão.

The official music video, directed by Daniel Ramos and released alongside the song, includes visual elements of the Brazilian culture intercut with footage taken during Mars's tour in Brazil. Mars started to include verses of the song during his performance of "Perm" on his tour in Brazil. In promotion for "Bonde do Brunão", Mars appeared as a featured artist at Fortnite Festival for the ninth season. The song received praise from publications, alongside accusations of cultural appropriation.

== Background and development ==
On September 11, 2023, after performing two shows at The Town festival in São Paulo, Mars posted a music video on Instagram and Twitter, which pays homage to Brazil, including the use of meme "come to Brazil" and his Brazilian nickname "Bruninho", and thanks Brazilian fans. In 2024, Mars started to sing portions of "Bonde do Brunão" during his shows in Brazil, which were part of the Bruno Mars Live (2022–2024) tour. After his final date in Brazil he posted the song on TikTok. It became viral, with over 13 million likes, 2 million shares and 687 thousand comments. On November 25, 2024, it became the most watched video on Mars's Instagram with 134 million views and fans asked for the official release. The idea for the full version of "Bonde do Brunão" arose as an improvisation during the last show of the tour.

"Bonde do Brunão" was written by Mars, Johnathan Yip, Ray Romulus and Jeremy Reeves. It was produced by Mars and the latter three as the Stereotypes, who also did programming. Yip was in charge of the percussion, Romulus played the synthesizer, while Reeves played the bass and also served as the mix and mastering engineer. Charles Moniz was the recording engineer. The song's production included several Brazilian music professionals to assure the song's authenticity. The art cover features outline of the Brazilian country drawn with green and yellow colors as a tribute to the country.

== Release and composition ==
The song was first previewed in November 2024 on Mars's TikTok. To commemorate Mars as the Fortnite Festival featured artist for Season 9, the full version of "Bonde do Brunão" officially premiered via Fortnite on June 18, 2025. On the same date, it was officially released in various countries via digital download and streaming by The Smeezingtons under exclusive license to Atlantic Records. It was only made available on Apple Music a day later. The song impacted Italian radio stations on the aforementioned date by Warner Music Italy.

"Bonde do Brunão" is a Brazilian funk song performed in Portuguese. Lyrically, it addresses Mars's arrival in Brazil and the ensuing party. The song not only pays homage to Brazil, but also draws inspiration and parodies "Cerol na Mão"^{(pt)} (2001) by Brazilian music funk group Bonde do Tigrão.^{(pt)} "Bonde do Brunão" is an energetic parody of the aforementioned song and an homage to Brazilian funk, including its slang and music. Mars adapted his vocals into Brazilian funk and used Brazilian catchphrases.

== Music video ==
The official music video for "Bonde do Brunão" coincided with the release of the song on June 18, 2025 and was directed by Daniel Ramos. It includes visual elements of the Brazilian culture. Some scenes were recorded in the streets of São Paulo and Rio de Janeiro where he interacts with fans, eats "coxinha" and dances with a bottle of "cachaça" in his hand. These clips are intercut with footage taken during Mars's tour in Brazil in 2024.

The video features Mars getting a tattoo of Cristo Redentor on his chest, dancing Brazilian funk along with a community in Belo Horizonte and striking a pose with a Caramelo dog, a symbol of Brazil. The footage shows the singer in São Paulo at a bar in Vila Madalena, Botequim De Primeira, drinking cachaça and eating snacks, including pão de queijo. The video also shows him DJ-ing a party, riding a motorcycle and performing live shows in Brazil. The video ends with a final message "Eu te amo Brasil, Bruninho will return..." (The first half of the sentence translated as "I love you Brazil") The footnote of the video said "More than a month in Brazil and I will never be the same again".

== Reception ==
Brazilian website O Antagonista and Spanish publication Terra opines that the song symbolizes a bond, celebrating Brazil with humor, rhythm and "muito gingado", and creating a bridge between worlds. The latter publication praises Mars's irreverence, respect and authenticity when blending different cultures. Terra highlights that Mars became one of the few international artists to create a song in Portuguese and dive into the Brazilian culture, revealing the trend of music globalization, and demonstrating that language and cultural barriers can be overcome through art. Although, some Brazilian listeners, on Twitter, accused him of cultural appropriation due to the similarities with "Cerol na Mão" (2001) by Bonde do Tigrão. others praised Mars for paying tribute to "the roots of Rio funk by interpreting verses and melodies typical of this musical genre", and serving as a respectful parody, where Mars redefines the original theme with humor.

== Promotion and live shows ==
At the beginning of his Brazilian 2024 show Mars said "Bruninho, voltou" (lil Bruno is back) an enounces "porra" (popular Brazilian slang term with multiple meanings. In this context, it can be translated as "Hell yeah".) During Mars's tour in Brazil, the performance of "Perm" included the verses "Desce até o chão, esse é o bonde do Brunão" (Get down to the ground, this is Brunão's crew). Mars asked where are the "solteiras" (single woman), later included on the lyrics of "Bonde do Brunão".

Mars, previously appearing in Fortnite as a part of Silk Sonic duo, was included as a featured artist at Fortnite Festival Season 9 where he performed "Bonde do Brunão". Epic Games added an emote of Mars to Fortnite based on the "Bonde do Brunão" dance, and included a skin "Estilo Bruninho" wearing a yellow and green t-shirt inspired by the music video. Some items were sold individually while other were exclusive to the "World Tour" bundle, such as "Bruno-San Outfit", "Bonde do Brunão Emote" and the "Bonde do Brunão Jam Track", among others.

In 2024, Ludmilla Correia from Billboard Brasil noticed the singer "has been...riding the Brazil Core wave. This movement...has reached the world of music and even fashion, consists of representing national identity through colors and symbols." Guilherme Umeda, social communicator and PhD professor of design at ESPM college commented: "This type of video is becoming a formula not only for other artists, but also for Bruno himself. There's calculation, planning, and intentionality". Mars' marketing campaign encouraged other musicians such as Ne-Yo, Simple Plan, and Karol G create interactions, publications, and special products exclusive to Brazil. In 2024, Mars performed a charity concert sponsored by Budweiser Brasil at the Tokio Marine Hall in São Paulo to help victims of the 2024 Rio Grande do Sul floods. After selling out the originally scheduled shows, four more extra shows were added to the tour. The official ticket booth lines for pre-sale and general ticket sales had collection points for donations of water, non-perishable food, and clothing brought by fans to be given to those affected by the floods in Rio Grande do Sul.

During Mars's stay in Brazil, besides performing 15 shows, he celebrated his birthday, attended cultural events and watched a soccer game in Maracanã, as well as attending traditional bars in São Paulo and Belo Horizonte. He received a symbolic CPF number, given by the Ministry of Management and Innovation in Public Services. After his visit to Laçador bar in Belo Horizonte, Mars included the bar into his music video. According to the bar proprietor, Ronaldo Teixeira, it became a tourist hot spot, improving its sales numbers and attracting the beer brand "Laçador" to sponsor the place, buying chairs and tables featuring Mars's face.

== Personnel ==
Credits adapted from Tidal.

- Bruno Mars – vocals, songwriter, producer
- Johnathan Yip – songwriting, synthesizer
- Ray Romulus – songwriting, percussion
- Jeremy Reeves – songwriting, bass, mix engineer, mastering engineer
- The Stereotypes – production, programming
- Charles Moniz – recording engineer

== Release history ==
List of release history, showing region, date, format and label
Region	Date	Format	Label	Ref.
Various	June 18, 2025	Digital download; streaming	The Smeezingtons; Atlantic	
Brazil	June 18, 2025	Digital download; streaming	Warner Music Brasil	
Italy	June 18, 2025	Radio airplay	Warner Music Italy	
