= Evil Genius (album) =

2018 album by Gucci Mane

Studio album by Gucci Mane
- Released: December 7, 2018
- Genre: Hip-hop; trap
- Length: 50:38
- Label: GUWOP; Atlantic
- Producer: Bone the Producer; Bruno Mars; Cubeatz; Deko; DJ Durel; Dre Moon; Dun Deal; DY; Earl the Pearll; G Koop; Honorable C.N.O.T.E.; Lab Cook; Marii Beatz; Metro Boomin; Murda Beatz; Sool Got Hits; OG Parker; Quavo; Smash David; Southside; Spiffy Global; Swede; Tarentino; Tre Pounds; Quay Global

Gucci Mane chronology
El Gato: The Human Glacier (2017)	Evil Genius (2018)	Delusions of Grandeur (2019)

Singles from Evil Genius
- 1. "Solitaire" Released: March 2, 2018; 2. "Kept Back" Released: August 9, 2018; 3. "Wake Up in the Sky" Released: September 14, 2018

Evil Genius is the twelfth studio album by American rapper Gucci Mane. It was released on December 7, 2018, by Atlantic Records and GUWOP Enterprises. The album features guest appearances from Quavo, 21 Savage, YoungBoy Never Broke Again, Kevin Gates, Bruno Mars, Kodak Black, Migos, Lil Yachty, Lil Skies, and Lil Pump, while the production was handled by Southside, Metro Boomin, Murda Beatz, Honorable C.N.O.T.E. and OG Parker, among others.

The album is supported by three singles: "Solitaire" featuring Migos and Lil Yachty, "Kept Back" featuring Lil Pump, and "Wake Up in the Sky" with Bruno Mars and Kodak Black. The album went gold on June 24, 2021.

== Background ==
Less than a week after releasing his mixtape El Gato: The Human Glacier, Gucci Mane announced his next studio album titled "The Evil Genius".

During an interview with Billboard, Gucci Mane spoke about the progress of album:

I've been really working on the songs. You know, I just don't put out anything. So I'm trying to make this project one of my best projects ever. I'm really trying to collaborate with the best producers and make sure I give my fans something that they can be like, 'Ok, Gucci still coming hard. He still passionate about the music.

In an interview with Zane Lowe, Gucci Mane revealed production from Metro Boomin, Southside, and Honorable C.N.O.T.E. and guest appearances from Offset, Quavo, 21 Savage, Kevin Gates and YoungBoy Never Broke Again.

On November 6, 2018, the album's release date was announced, alongside the revealing of the tracklist.

On November 27, 2018, the cover art was revealed via Instagram, with a short album teaser on Twitter.

== Promotion ==
The album's lead single, "Solitaire" featuring Migos and Lil Yachty, was released on March 2, 2018. The music video was released on May 22, 2018.

Followed by the second single, bonus track "Kept Back" featuring Lil Pump was released on August 9, 2018. The official music video was released on October 17, 2018 for Mane’s “National 1017 Day” to celebrate the day in 2017 he married Jamaican model Keyshia Ka'oir.

The third single "Wake Up in the Sky" with Bruno Mars and Kodak Black was released on September 14, 2018. The music video was released on October 31, 2018. The single is tied for Gucci Mane's highest charting single to date, peaking at number 11 on the Billboard Hot 100. It is also his highest performing single on radio.

"I'm Not Goin'" featuring Kevin Gates, was released as the first promotional single on November 15, 2018, along with the music video.

"Bipolar" featuring Quavo, was released as the second promotional single on November 30, 2018.

== Critical reception ==
Professional ratings
Aggregate scores
Source	Rating
Metacritic	78/100
Review scores
Source	Rating
AllMusic	4/5 stars
Consequence of Sound	C+
Exclaim!	8/10
HipHopDX	3.6/5
NME	5/5 stars
Pitchfork	6.5/10

Evil Genius received generally positive reviews from critics. Evan Rytlewski of Pitchfork generally praised the album, giving it a 6.5 out of 10, but noted that although "it's one of his most considered and carefully curated projects, Gucci plays it uncharacteristically safe for most of it." Aaron Williams of Uproxx praised Gucci's effort, saying that "On his latest project, Gucci Mane may not break much new ground, but he's reached the point in his career where he doesn't really need to, because he already has."

== Commercial performance ==
Evil Genius debuted at number five on the US Billboard 200 chart, earning 51,000 album-equivalent units (with 5,000 in traditional album sales) in its first week, becoming Gucci Mane's fifth top-ten album on the chart.

== Track listing ==
Credits adapted from Tidal.

No.	Title	Writer(s)	Producer(s)	Length
1.	"Off the Boat"	Radric Davis; David Cunningham; Jamarii Massey; Nick Seeley	Dun Deal; Marii Beatz; Seeley	3:45
2.	"By Myself"	Davis; Massey	Marii Beatz; Bone The Producer	2:54
3.	"BiPolar" (featuring Quavo)	Davis; Quavious Marshall; Joshua Parker; Grant Decouto; Samuel Jimenez	OG Parker; Deko; Smash David	3:34
4.	"Just Like It" (featuring 21 Savage)	Davis; Shayaa Abraham-Joseph; Carlton Mays, Jr.; Robert Mandell	Honorable C.N.O.T.E.; G Koop	3:03
5.	"Cold Shoulder" (featuring YoungBoy Never Broke Again)	Davis; Kentrell Gaulden; Earl Bynum	Earl on the Beat	3:19
6.	"On God"	Davis; Joshua Luellen; Dwan Avery; Mario Martinez	Southside; DY	2:06
7.	"Father's Day"	Davis; Leland Wayne; Andre Proctor; Edward Randle; Renee Kirk	Metro Boomin; Dre Moon	1:51
8.	"Outta Proportion"	Davis; Chris Rosser	Quay Global	2:24
9.	"Lost Y'all Mind" (featuring Quavo)	Davis; Marshall; Courtland Johnson	Spiffy Global	2:35
10.	"I'm Not Goin'" (featuring Kevin Gates)	Davis; Kevin Gilyard; Shane Lindstrom; Rasool Diaz	Murda Beatz; Sool Got Hits	3:16
11.	"Wake Up in the Sky" (with Bruno Mars and Kodak Black)	Davis; Peter Hernandez; Bill Kapri; Chance Youngblood; Avery; Jeff LaCroix	Tarentino; DY; Tre Pounds; Bruno Mars	3:23
12.	"Solitaire" (featuring Migos and Lil Yachty)	Davis; Marshall; Kirshnik Ball; Miles McCollum; Daryl McPherson; Grant Dickinson	Honorable C.N.O.T.E.; DJ Durel; Quavo; Lab Cook	2:16
13.	"This the Night"	Davis; Luellen; Robert Curti	Southside; Swede	2:48
14.	"Mad Russian" (featuring Lil Skies)	Davis; Kimetrius Foose; Linstrom; Masamune Kudo	Murda Beatz; Rex Kudo	2:21
15.	"Hard Feelings"	Davis; Luellen; Kevin Gomringer; Tim Gomringer	Southside; Cubeatz	2:46
16.	"Lord"	Davis; Luellen; Avery; Martinez	Southside; DY	2:34
17.	"Money Callin"	Davis; Johnson	Spiffy Global	2:46
18.	"Kept Back" (featuring Lil Pump (bonus track))	Davis; Gazzy Garcia; Lindstrom	Murda Beatz	2:57
Total length:				50:38

== Personnel ==
Credits adapted from Tidal.

- Eddie "eMIX" Hernandez – mixing (tracks 7, 15)
- Serban Ghenea – mixing (track 11)
- Kori Anders – mixing (track 12)
- Colin Leonard – mastering (tracks 7, 12, 15)

== Charts ==
=== Weekly charts ===
Chart (2018–19)	Peak position
Belgian Albums (Ultratop Flanders)	142
Canadian Albums (Billboard)	15
Dutch Albums (Album Top 100)	49
French Albums (SNEP)	149
US Billboard 200	5
US Top R&B/Hip-Hop Albums (Billboard)	3

=== Year-end charts ===
Chart (2019)	Position
US Billboard 200	169
US Top R&B/Hip-Hop Albums (Billboard)	71

== Certifications ==
Region	Certification	Certified units/sales
United States (RIAA)	Platinum	1,000,000^{‡}
^{‡} Sales+streaming figures based on certification alone.
