= Finesse (Bruno Mars song) =

2018 single by Bruno Mars featuring Cardi B

Single by Bruno Mars featuring Cardi B

from the album 24K Magic
- Released: January 4, 2018
- Studio: Glenwood Place (Burbank, California)
- Genre: New jack swing; hip-hop soul; funk
- Length: 3:11 (album); 3:37 (remix)
- Label: Atlantic
- Songwriters: Bruno Mars; Philip Lawrence; Christopher Brody Brown; James Fauntleroy; Johnathan Yip; Ray Romulus; Jeremy Reeves; Ray McCullough II; Belcalis Almanzar; Klenord Raphael
- Producers: Shampoo Press & Curl; The Stereotypes

Bruno Mars singles chronology
"Chunky" (2017)	"Finesse" (2018)	"Wake Up in the Sky" (2018)

Cardi B singles chronology
"Bartier Cardi" (2017)	"Finesse" (2018)	"Be Careful" (2018)

Music video
- "Finesse (Remix)" on YouTube

"Finesse" is a song by American singer Bruno Mars from his third studio album, 24K Magic (2016). The song was written by Mars, Philip Lawrence, Christopher Brody Brown, James Fauntleroy, Jonathan Yip, Ray Romulus, Jeremy Reeves and Ray McCullough II. The former three produced it under the name Shampoo Press & Curl, along with the latter four, as the Stereotypes. The song was composed after a jam session as Mars wanted to recreate the "new jack swing sound". Atlantic Records released a remix, featuring verses from American rapper Cardi B, as the album's fifth and final single on January 4, 2018. Musically, it is a new jack swing, hip-hop soul and funk song. The lyrics demonstrate the happiness of being with who one loves and the positive outcome of that for them and others.

"Finesse" was well received by music critics, who complimented Cardi B's verses, on the remix, and compared them to the old-school hip hop flow. Moreover, according to critics, the song evokes the sound of Bobby Brown's album Don't Be Cruel (1988), Bell Biv DeVoe's track "Poison" (1990), and Michael Jackson's "Remember the Time" (1991). The song was a commercial success, peaking at number two in New Zealand, and number three in the United States and Canada. It has also entered the top ten of Australia, Ireland, the Netherlands and the United Kingdom. The song was certified five times platinum by Recording Industry Association of America (RIAA) and Recorded Music NZ (RMNZ). It was also certified eight times platinum by Music Canada (MC) and three times platinum by the Australian Recording Industry Association (ARIA).

The accompanying music video, which was directed by Florent Dechard and Mars, pays homage to the popular FOX sketch comedy television series In Living Color (1990–1994). To promote "Finesse", Mars and Cardi B performed it at the 60th Annual Grammy Awards. In 2018, the song was included on a medley of hits performed by Cardi B at the iHeartRadio Music Awards and by Kelly Clarkson at the Billboard Music Awards. It received several awards, including Favorite Song Soul/R&B at the 2018 American Music Awards, Video of the Year at the 2018 Soul Train Music Awards, as well as Best Collaboration at the 2019 iHeartRadio Music Awards. It was also nominated for Video of the Year at the 2018 MTV Video Music Awards.

== Background and development ==
In September 2014, Bruno Mars tweeted, "Now it's time to start writing chapter 3", hinting he was working on new music. Following the release of the successful Mark Ronson and Mars's featured single "Uptown Funk" (2014), Mars headed to the studio to record more songs, and said he had no plans to release a new album "until it's done". The album was due in March 2016, but Mars's appearance at the Super Bowl halftime show postponed it for several months. At the time, seven songs were already recorded.

The Stereotypes had known Mars and worked with him since 2007, but after he signed a deal with Atlantic Records, in 2009, they did not collaborate very often. In 2015, Jonathan Yip of the team talked with Mars about working together. Mars was already recording 24K Magic and asked for "some beats", which Yip sent. Mars later asked for more samples and the Stereotypes sent them, but they never heard back: "Nothing came of it", they said. In June 2016, Yip contacted Mars, who asked the former if the Stereotypes would like to help him finish a song for his album; he needed another song with a certain tempo and key. Yip sent Mars an idea that caught his attention, with him asking the Stereotypes to go to the studio. After helping Mars finish "24K Magic" and "That's What I Like", the team brought "in another track idea". The idea went into fruition when Mars decided to come up with the "new jack swing sound of Keith Sweat and Bobby Brown". It was created from scratch after a jam session in Mars's studio. While he was playing a drum set, everyone was either playing an instrument, singing, or yelling.

During an interview with Rolling Stone magazine, Mars said one iteration of "Finesse" had him singing about "gold chains and cognac over a silky beat", which he found "too corny", and another version sounded "like a Seventies cop show—like I should be on roller skates". Mars explained, "Anytime you see us, on tour, on TV, I want to be moving ... I was very conscious on this album of the bounce." However, he was not satisfied with the 20th version of the song, rearranging its groove. At that time, Mars also decided to fix the bridge of the song, since there was something bothering him on the harmonies or on the chord progression. Mars furthered, "I don't know what's not hitting home. There's just something weird that I ain't fucking with yet."

When Mars chose "Finesse" as a single, he told the Stereotypes that he wanted rapper Cardi B to feature on it. The former said on an Instagram post, "I met Cardi B at 3 a.m. after my show in LA, backstage, where we recorded her verse for 'Finesse'. She walked in the room and she was everything I'd hoped she'd be." Charles Moniz, Mars's audio engineer, confirmed this as he recorded their vocals on selected microphones and "brought all the sound elements together". Rumors regarding the collaboration between Mars and Cardi B began on Twitter around Christmas 2017. Billboard's associated director of charts and radio confirmed Mars was set to release new music on January 4, 2018.

== Production and release ==
"Finesse" was written by Mars, Philip Lawrence, Christopher Brody Brown, James Fauntleroy, Yip, Ray Romulus, Jeremy Reeves and Ray McCullough II. Its production was handled by the former three under their alias Shampoo Press & Curl, along with the latter four as the Stereotypes. Mars, Lawrence, Brown, and Fauntleroy served as the background vocalists. The recording was done and engineered by Moniz, with additional engineering assistance by Jacob Dennis, at Glenwood Place Studios in Burbank, California. It was mixed at MixStar Studios in Virginia Beach by Serban Ghenea, with John Hanes serving as the mixing engineer. Tom Coyne mastered the track at Sterling Sound. The remix features additional songwriting by Cardi B and Klenord Raphael, and new mastering by Randy Merrill at Sterling Sound.

In early January 2018, Mars announced via Instagram that "Finesse" would be the album's fifth single, and unlike the original, the single version features rap verses from Cardi B. The announcement was accompanied with the single's artwork, which features Mars and Cardi B "channeling some serious '90s music video vibes". It was released on January 4, 2018, via digital download and streaming services in various countries via Atlantic Records. Warner Music Group also issued the track for radio airplay in Italy on January 8, 2018. Subsequently, the song was released to US contemporary hit radio stations on January 9, 2018, by Atlantic Records. BBC Radio 1 began adding the song onto their playlists on January 12, 2018. American urban contemporary radio stations began adding the track onto their playlists on January 16, 2018, through the aforementioned label. On March 23, 2018, two additional remixes of the single version were released in various countries by Atlantic Records. A vinyl featuring the single rendition of "Finesse" and its original version was released in 2018. The version with Cardi B was later included on the deluxe version of 24K Magic. The remixed version was also included on Mars's first compilation album, Collaborations (2026).

== Composition ==
"Finesse"
A 19-second sample of "Finesse" containing harmonic background vocals on the chorus.

"Finesse" is a new jack swing, funk and hip-hop soul song with a light influence of R&B. The song draws its main inspiration from the early 1990s new jack swing sound. The original version was composed in the key of A♭ major at a tempo of 124 beats per minute. The song features Mars in the center of the track, with a "tightly clipped vocal delivery" sounding like Bobby Brown. Its instrumentation features walloping clattering drum machine rhythms, syncopated rhythms, lurching "orchestral-stab" synthesizers, and "close-harmony background vocals". It all resonates with the sound of Bobby Brown's album Don't Be Cruel (1988) and its title track. Most critics say the open "programmed snare line" on "Finesse" resembles the one in Bell Biv DeVoe's "Poison" (1990). Its bass line and beat have also been compared to Michael Jackson's "Remember the Time" (1992), and the new jack swing style to Jackson's album Dangerous (1991). The lyrics demonstrate the happiness of being with who one loves and the positive outcome of that for them and others. It is also "about being confident with the person you're taking out".

For its single release, the composition of the song was reworked to feature verses from Cardi B. The key of the song was changed to A♭ minor and the tempo was reduced to 100 beats per minute. Her flow and rhymes on the track have been compared to "turn-of-the-1990s cadence", as well as to Salt-N-Pepa and Heavy D styles.

== Critical reception ==
The album version of "Finesse" has received generally positive reviews from music critics. Caroline Sullivan from The Guardian praised the song for paying homage to new jack swing, calling it a "resurrection". Nick Levine, writing for NME, thought the song is "pitch-perfect pastiche of the new jack swing sound that recalls" Jackson's "Remember The Time" (1992). AllMusic's Andy Kellman said "Finesse" reminded him of "the era when Teddy Riley, Dave 'Jam' Hall, and Dr. Freeze fused hip-hop with electronic post-disco R&B pioneered by Leon Sylvers III, Kashif, and Jimmy Jam and Terry Lewis". He added that the song, just like his preceders, "is a blast". Patrick Ryan of USA Today recommended the casual reader to download the song. On the other hand, Jonathan Wroble of Slant Magazine criticized the song for being a copycat of Bell Biv DeVoe's "Poison" (1990) and for "failing to add anything new to his rehashing of new jack swing". American singer-songwriter Meshell Ndegeocello opined that Mars copied Bell Biv DeVoe, Babyface and the work of Jimmy Jam & Terry Lewis with The Human League on "Finesse".

The remix also received positive reviews from music critics. Chris Gayomali writing for GQ considered the album version to be a "sleeper jam" and dubbed the remix a "bop". Gayomali continued, "The pairing with Bardi hits all the feel-good throwback notes." Dean Nguyen from The Irish Times said the remix is a "2018 single-of-the-year candidate" as its composition recalls "Bell Biv DeVoe and Dangerous (1991)-era Michael Jackson". Ron Dicker of HuffPost complemented the duo and the song, "Mars and Cardi B killed it in a remix for the ages." Jody Rosen, writing for The New York Times, opined that the single "sounds like the new jack swing Platonic ideal. It's an imitation so fine-tuned it makes the originals seem ersatz." The Independent's Roisin O'Connor said that despite being a Bruno Mars song, Cardi B "steals the show" due to her perfect and reminiscent of the old-school hip hop flow. O'Connor added that despite the flow, "it still manages to capture her distinct style". Jon Dolan from Rolling Stone called the song "the perfect sweet, playful date-night jam if you're stepping out with the arm candy of your dreams."

=== Accolades ===
The song was listed by two publications as being among the best songs of the year. On Billboard's 100 Best Songs of 2018: Critics' Picks list, the single was placed at number 19. Katie Atkinson wrote that the single "is best described by its one-word title". Atkinson added, "the combination of Mars' nostalgic R&B paired with Cardi's Rosie Perez-channeling swagger was undeniable"." Slant Magazines's Zachary Hoskins criticize the single's opening as it takes from the "programmed snare line" of Bell Biv DeVoe's "Poison". Nevertheless, he praised Cardi B's guest verse, and the happiness Mars and Cardi B feel as it can be heard on the outro, "We got it goin' on / Don't it feel so good to be us?". Hoskins ranked it number 11 on the list of 25 songs. In the same year, the remix was included on Cardi B's 10 Best Features & Collabs: Critic's Picks. Michael Saponara, who compiled the list, placed it at number three. In 2021, Billboard considered the song's bridge as one of the best of the 21st Century, Paul Grein affirmed that Mars "plays cupid", telling men and women "on how to get it goin' on". Grein added that the "romantic interlude balances the streetwise edginess of Cardi's rap segments".

In 2018, "Finesse" was nominated for Top R&B Song at the 2018 Billboard Music Awards, but lost to Mars's "That's What I Like" (2017). It was also nominated for Best Collaboration at the BET Awards. That same year, the song was nominated for Song of the Year and Best Collaboration at the MTV Video Music Awards, as well as for Choice Music: Collaboration and Choice Music: R&B/Hip-Hop Song at the 2018 Teen Choice Awards. The single received a nomination for Collaboration of the Year and an award for Favorite Soul/R&B Song at the 2018 American Music Awards. In late 2018, "Finesse" received nominations for Song of the Year, The Ashford & Simpson Songwriter's Award and Best Collaboration Performance at the 2018 Soul Train Music Awards.

In 2019, the song received a nomination for excellence in Record Production/Single or Track at the 2019 TEC Awards. It also received a nomination for Best International Song at the Danish GAFFA Awards, while being nominated for R&B Song of the Year and winning Best Collaboration at the 2019 iHeartRadio Music Awards. That same year, the track received a nomination for Outstanding Song, Contemporary and Outstanding Duo, Group or Collaboration at the 2019 NAACP Image Awards. It also received a Titanium Award from iHeartRadio for reaching a threshold of 1 billion total audience spins. "Finesse" received two awards from ASCAP, one from the Pop Music Awards, as it was one of the winners of Most Performed Song, and another from the Rhythm & Soul Music Awards, as one of the Winning R&B/Hip-Hop Songs.

== Commercial performance ==
=== North America ===
Following the release of the remix and its official music video on January 4, 2018, "Finesse" debuted at number 35 on the US Billboard Hot 100 for the week of January 13, 2018. It entered the Billboard Digital Songs chart at number 13 with 30,000 copies in just one day of sales. The song had drawn 8.7 million streams from the time of its release, and debuted at the Billboard Radio Songs chart at number 49 with 26 million audience impressions. After its first complete tracking week, "Finesse" peaked at number three on the Hot 100, becoming Mars's 15th and Cardi B's fourth top ten single on the chart. It sold 87,000 copies, peaking at number two on the Billboard Digital Songs; the song rose to number 12 on the US Radio Songs chart with 52 million audience impressions and debuted at number one on the US Streaming Songs chart with 38.3 million streams. It also peaked at number one on the US Hot R&B/Hip-Hop Songs chart and was Mars's first single, as a lead artist, to top the US Dance Club Songs chart.

The single made Mars's became the second male artist, after Lionel Richie, to have three top-tens from each of his first three studio albums. When the track topped the Billboard Radio Songs chart, it became Mars's eighth number-one on the chart, making him the first male artist with eight number-one songs. At the time, Rihanna led the list with 13 songs peaking at number one on the chart. "Finesse" also peaked at number one on the Billboard Mainstream Top 40, with Mars becoming the first solo male artist in the chart's history to have nine number ones. "Finesse" was certified four times platinum by the Recording Industry Association of America (RIAA). In Canada, "Finesse" peaked at number three on the Canadian Hot 100 and on the Canada Hot AC, but it topped the Canada CHR/Top 40. It was certified eight times platinum by Music Canada (MC)

=== International ===
In the United Kingdom, "Finesse" entered the UK Singles Chart at number seven, marking Mars's eleventh and Cardi B's first top ten in the country. The following week, the song rose to number five, becoming his highest peak since "24K Magic" (2016), matching the same position. "Finesse" remained within the top ten for six consecutive weeks and was certified double platinum by the British Phonographic Industry (BPI). On the Belgian charts, the single debuted at number 36 on January 13, 2018, on the Ultratop 50 in Flanders, peaking at number eight for three non-consecutive weeks. On the Ultratop 50 in Wallonia, the song entered at number 44 on January 20, 2018, and went on to peak at number eight in March, of that year, for two consecutive weeks. It was certified gold by the Belgian Entertainment Association (BEA). Elsewhere, the track topped the charts in Croatia and it peaked at number five on the Irish Singles Chart, spending 24 weeks on the latter chart.

The remix of "Finesse" also peaked at number eight on the Portuguese Singles Chart, earning a platinum plaque from the Associação Fonográfica Portuguesa (AFP). It entered the Official New Zealand Music Chart at number nine on January 15, 2019. In its fifth week, the track peaked at number two, where it remained for two weeks, becoming Mars's sixteenth top-ten single in New Zealand. The song received a five times platinum certification from the Recording Industry Association of New Zealand (RMNZ). In Australia, the single debuted at number 15 on the ARIA Singles Chart. In its fourth week on the chart, the song peaked at number six for two consecutive weeks. It was certified three-times platinum by the Australian Recording Industry Association (ARIA), for sales and streams equivalent to 210,000 units. The song reached the top ten in several other countries, including Greece, El Salvador, and the Netherlands.

== Music video ==
=== Background and concept ===
The concept for the music video began when Mars and Phil Tayag of the Jabbawockeez were exchanging ideas, always having consideration for the 1990s song vibe. At one point, Mars asked Tayag, "What if we do In Living Color?". Tayag was fond of the idea and they decided to go ahead with it. Afterwards, Mars got the permission and help from 20th Century Fox and series creator Keenen Ivory Wayans to pay homage to the American sketch comedy television series In Living Color (1990–1994), thanking both of them for it. Tayag invited Danielle Polanco, Bianca Brewton, TJ Lewis, and Ysabelle Capitulé to be dancers for the music video and confessed that the shooting day was a celebration of everyone's accomplishments, "It wasn't any funny stuff, it wasn't all Hollywood." DJ Rashida made an appearance as one of several DJs on set. Once on the set of In Living Color, trying to replicate it, the dancers felt everything was "surreal" with the verbatim, the vibe, the gear, and the clothes.

Capitulé recalled the music video taking three days to make, consisting of two nine-hour rehearsals and one 15-hour shoot. She added that with Mars they had to work hard, but there were moments of goofiness, and the latter was not looking to be the main character supported by backed-up dancers, but instead "wanted it to feel as if they were all in one crew together". She said it was an honor for the dancers "to emulate the show's iconic Fly Girls". The visual was directed by Mars and Florent Dechard, with choreography done by Tayag and Mars, with Tayag as a creative consultant. According to comedian and former actor of In Living Color, David Alan Grier, the set-up of the video matched exactly the one in the show, including the original paint can intro and the DJ booth.

=== Synopsis ===
The video premiered on January 4, 2018, and pays homage to In Living Color. The former was formatted in a 4:3 aspect ratio, but the main dance sequence was shot at 60 frames per second. Jake Rodkin, the video editor, explained that this was done to evoke the nostalgia of videos shot in the 1990s without using fake scan lines or VHS fuzz. The outfits were inspired by brand the Cross Colours. Cardi B was dressed in washed denim cutoffs, a bold neon jacket, tube socks, a backwards baseball cap, oversized gold doorknocker earrings, and bold pink eye shadow. Mars and the male dancers wore vertical-striped tops and denim cloths, while the female dancers wore crop tops, vertical stripes and bold colors. The music video opens with Mars and Cardi B using paint and spray paint, reenacting the intro scene from the In Living Color theme song as the latter raps, before Mars's first verse begins. It features several scenes of old-school choreographed dancing between Mars and a dance troupe similar to the original show's Fly Girls, who dance on a rooftop set in a soundstage while Mars sings the second verse. DJ Rashida is seen in various scenes of the video on a DJ booth.

=== Reception ===
Roisin O'Connor, music correspondent for The Independent, classified Mars's and Cardi B's tribute to In Living Color as "brilliant". Time's Raise Bruner said, "Cardi B and Bruno Mars made the "splashiest '90s music video." Dicker praised their outfits and energy on the music video. Shenequa Golding, writing for Vibe, found the outfits on the homage to be "jiggy". Frank Guan from Vulture.com criticized Mars for not being innovative due to the video being in tribute to In Living Color, but praised Cardi B's playful and goofiness social-media presence, as it fits "the early-'90s aesthetic lovingly re-created by Mars". Several cast members of the TV show, including Damon Wayans, Marlon Wayans, Kim Wayans, Grier, and Jennifer Lopez, praised and thanked Mars for the tribute.

The video for "Finesse" was listed tenth on Billboard's 50 Music Videos of 2018: Billboard Staff Picks list. In late 2018, Lyndsey Parker of Yahoo! Music considered the visuals the sixth-best of the year. Parker commented, "Bruno and his Fly Girl sidekick bring '90s-retro finesse back to the TV screen in this spot-on perfect In Living Color homage." Mike Nied from Idolator, on his list of The 30 Best Music Videos of 2018 (So Far), ranked it at number ten, saying "The twosome single-handedly brought the '90s back to life in their vibrant collaboration." The video for the song was included on Billboard's 100 Greatest Music Videos of the 21st Century: Critics' Picks list. Ranking at number 53, Taylor Weatherby said, "Just as ILC was a cultural moment of the '90s, 'Finesse' helped Bruno Mars and Cardi B solidify their place as icons of 2018."

In 2018, the music video won Video of the Year at the 2018 Soul Train Music Awards and was also nominated for Best Dance Performance. That same year, it earned nominations for Video of the Year at the BET Awards and at the MTV Video Music Awards, as well as both Best Choreography and Best Editing at the latter award show. The video received the award for Best Music Video at the 2019 iHeartRadio Music Awards and was nominated for Outstanding Music Video/Visual Album at the 2019 NAACP Image Awards. The video received 13 million views within its first two days of release.

== Live performances and other usage ==
Mars's first televised live performance of "Finesse" occurred at the Apollo Theater alongside the majority of 24K Magic (2016) for his CBS prime time special titled Bruno Mars: 24K Magic Live at the Apollo, which aired on November 29, 2017. He performed the single with Cardi B for the first time at the 60th Annual Grammy Awards. The performance started with Cardi B entering the stage in a color-blocked outfit, while Mars, along with his band and dancers, also wearing colorful outfits, appeared on a separate stage, which had a background featuring the word "Finesse" spelled out in the show's logo font. It included a dance break performed by Mars and his dancers to the sound of Prince's "Gett Off" (1991) and House of Pain's "Jump Around" (1992). The live show ended with Cardi B rapping verses of her single, "Bartier Cardi" (2017). The performance received positive reviews, who found it similar to the 1990s theme of the music video. Chris Payne of Billboard commented, "In one of the most captivating moments if the 2018 Grammys combined for an action-packed, '90s-tastic performance." Writing for Vibe, J'na Jefferson dubbed the performance as "stand-out", while People's Maria Pasquine wrote, "The duo, who broke the internet with their In Living Color-inspired video, tore up the Grammys stage." Charles Holmes from MTV News praised the performance, affirming that "the chemistry between Cardi and Mars was so electric the duo should think about dropping a collaboration album to save 2018". Paste's Ellen Johnson considered the performance at the Grammys one of the best of all time, ranking it at number seven, saying that the nostalgia along with Mars's charisma and Cardi B's personable rapping couldn't go wrong. Cardi B confessed that she was nervous during the performance and decided to use a common stage fright technique in picking a blank spot in the crowd. She said that Mars is a perfectionist, henceforth they rehearsed every day for a whole week, and she didn't want to disappoint him.

Cardi B opened the 2018 iHeart Music Awards with a medley of her biggest hits, including a verse from the remix of "Finesse". Hilary Hughes from Billboard found the performance of the "Finesse" remix to have "shined on its own". On May 20 at the 2018 Billboard Music Awards, Kelly Clarkson performed a medley of various Billboard Hot 100 hits during her monologue, including Cardi B's verse from the remix of Mars's "Finesse". On Mars's third tour, the 24K Magic World Tour (2017–18), "Finesse" was the opening act of the set list, he also sung it during the shows of Bruno Mars Live (2022-24). Pentatonix, an American a cappella group, recorded a cover of the single for their 2018 album PTX Presents: Top Pop, Vol. I. It was part of the soundtracks for the video games Just Dance 2019 and NBA 2K19. The remix was also used as the background music for the swimsuit competition of Miss Universe 2018, which was held in Bangkok, Thailand in December of that year.

== Track listing ==
Digital download
No.	Title	Length
1.	"Finesse" (Remix) (featuring Cardi B)	3:37

Digital download
No.	Title	Length
1.	"Finesse" (James Hype Remix) (featuring Cardi B)	3:55
2.	"Finesse" (Pink Panda Remix) (featuring Cardi B)	2:28

Vinyl
No.	Title	Length
1.	"Finesse" (Remix) (featuring Cardi B)	3:37
2.	"Finesse"	3:10

== Personnel ==
=== Original version ===
Credits adapted from the liner notes of 24K Magic, and credits for the remix version are adapted from the liner notes of Finesse and ASCAP.

- Bruno Mars – lead vocals, songwriting, background vocals
- Philip Lawrence – songwriting, background vocals
- Christopher Brody Brown – songwriting, background vocals
- James Fauntleroy – songwriting, background vocals
- Johnathan Yip – songwriting
- Ray Romulus – songwriting
- Jeremy Reeves – songwriting
- Ray McCullough II – songwriting
- Shampoo Press & Curl – production
- The Stereotypes – production
- Charles Moniz – recording, engineering
- Jacob Dennis – engineering assistance
- Serban Ghenea – mixing
- John Hanes – mix engineering
- Tom Coyne – mastering

=== Cardi B remix ===
Personnel from the original version remains the same.

- Cardi B – guest vocals, songwriting
- Klenord Raphael – songwriting
- Randy Merrill – mastering

== Charts ==
=== Weekly charts ===
List of chart positions
Chart (2018)	Peak position
Argentina (Monitor Latino)	17
Australia (ARIA)	6
Austria (Ö3 Austria Top 40)	30
Belgium (Ultratop 50 Flanders)	8
Belgium (Ultratop 50 Wallonia)	8
Bolivia (Monitor Latino)	10
Brazil (Top 100 Brasil)	71
Canada Hot 100 (Billboard)	3
Canada AC (Billboard)	15
Canada CHR/Top 40 (Billboard)	1
Canada Hot AC (Billboard)	3
Chile Anglo (Monitor Latino)	2
Colombia (National-Report)	20
Croatia International Airplay (HRT)	1
Czech Republic Singles Digital (ČNS IFPI)	47
Denmark (Tracklisten)	14
Ecuador (National-Report)	17
El Salvador (Monitor Latino)	7
Finland (Suomen virallinen lista)	18
France (SNEP)	48
Germany (GfK) Solo version	31
Greece (IFPI)	6
Honduras (Monitor Latino)	13
Hungary (Dance Top 40)	3
Hungary (Rádiós Top 40)	14
Hungary (Single Top 40)	18
Iceland (Tónlistinn)	4
Ireland (IRMA)	5
Israel (Media Forest)	1
Italy (FIMI)	62
Japan Hot 100 (Billboard)	17
Lebanon (OLT20)	13
Malaysia (RIM)	12
Mexico (Billboard Mexican Airplay)	20
Netherlands (Dutch Top 40)	9
Netherlands (Single Top 100)	9
New Zealand (Recorded Music NZ)	2
Norway (VG-lista)	24
Panama (Monitor Latino)	14
Paraguay (Monitor Latino)	14
Portugal (AFP)	8
Scottish Singles Sales (Official Charts)	16
Slovakia Singles Digital (ČNS IFPI)	41
Spain (Promusicae) Solo version	47
Sweden (Sverigetopplistan)	14
Switzerland (Schweizer Hitparade)	29
UK Singles (Official Charts)	5
US Billboard Hot 100	3
US Adult Contemporary (Billboard)	19
US Adult Pop Airplay (Billboard)	9
US Dance Club Songs (Billboard)	1
US Dance Airplay (Billboard)	2
US Latin Pop Airplay (Billboard)	39
US Hot R&B/Hip-Hop Songs (Billboard)	1
US Pop Airplay (Billboard)	1
US Rhythmic Airplay (Billboard)	1
Venezuela (National-Report)	25

List of chart positions
Chart (2024)	Peak position
Singapore (RIAS)	20

=== Year-end charts ===
List of chart positions
Chart (2018)	Position
Argentina (Monitor Latino)	62
Australia (ARIA)	39
Belgium (Ultratop Flanders)	26
Belgium (Ultratop Wallonia)	51
Bolivia (Monitor Latino)	54
Canada (Canadian Hot 100)	22
Colombia (Monitor Latino)	87
Costa Rica (Monitor Latino)	55
Denmark (Tracklisten)	73
El Salvador (Monitor Latino)	35
France (SNEP)	185
Guatemala (Monitor Latino)	89
Honduras (Monitor Latino)	33
Hungary (Dance Top 40)	8
Hungary (Rádiós Top 40)	66
Iceland (Plötutíóindi)	8
Netherlands (Dutch Top 40)	38
Netherlands (Single Top 100)	71
Nicaragua (Monitor Latino)	74
New Zealand (Recorded Music NZ)	17
Panama (Monitor Latino)	43
Paraguay (Monitor Latino)	80
Peru (Monitor Latino)	83
Portugal (AFP)	58
South Korea International (Gaon)	86
Taiwan (Hito Radio)	23
UK Singles (OCC)	57
US Billboard Hot 100	14
US Adult Top 40 (Billboard)	30
US Dance Club Songs (Billboard)	28
US Dance/Mix Show Airplay Songs (Billboard)	19
US Hot R&B/Hip-Hop Songs (Billboard)	9
US Mainstream Top 40 (Billboard)	20
US Rhythmic (Billboard)	10

List of chart positions
Chart (2019)	Position
Hungary (Dance Top 40)	67

== Certifications ==
List of certifications
Region	Certification	Certified units/sales
Australia (ARIA)	3× Platinum	210,000^{‡}
Belgium (BRMA)	Gold	10,000^{‡}
Canada (Music Canada)	8× Platinum	640,000^{‡}
Denmark (IFPI Danmark)	Platinum	90,000^{‡}
France (SNEP)	Platinum	200,000^{‡}
Germany (BVMI)	Gold	200,000^{‡}
Italy (FIMI)	Gold	25,000^{‡}
New Zealand (RMNZ)	5× Platinum	150,000^{‡}
Poland (ZPAV)	Gold	25,000^{‡}
Portugal (AFP)	Platinum	10,000^{‡}
Spain (Promusicae)	Gold	20,000^{‡}
Switzerland (IFPI Switzerland)	Gold	10,000^{‡}
United Kingdom (BPI)	2× Platinum	1,200,000^{‡}
United States (RIAA)	5× Platinum	5,000,000^{‡}
^{‡} Sales+streaming figures based on certification alone.

== Release history ==
List of release history, showing region(s), date(s), format(s), version(s) and label(s)
Region	Date	Format	Version	Label(s)	Ref.
Various	January 4, 2018	Digital download; streaming	Remix (featuring Cardi B)	Atlantic	
Italy	January 8, 2018	Radio airplay	Remix (featuring Cardi B)	Warner Music Group	
United States	January 9, 2018	Contemporary hit radio	Remix (featuring Cardi B)	Atlantic	
United States	January 16, 2018	Urban contemporary radio	Remix (featuring Cardi B)	Atlantic	
Various	March 23, 2018	Digital download; streaming	Remixes	Atlantic	
United States	2018	Vinyl	Remix (featuring Cardi B); Original	Atlantic	
