= Skate (song) =

Single by Silk Sonic

from the album An Evening with Silk Sonic
- Released: July 30, 2021
- Studio: Shampoo Press & Curl
- Genre: R&B; disco; funk
- Length: 3:23
- Label: Aftermath; Atlantic
- Songwriters: Bruno Mars; Brandon Anderson; Dernst Emile II; James Fauntleroy; Domitille Degalle; JD Beck
- Producers: Bruno Mars; D'Mile

Bruno Mars singles chronology
"Leave the Door Open" (2021)	"Skate" (2021)	"Smokin out the Window" (2021)

Anderson .Paak singles chronology
"Leave the Door Open" (2021)	"Skate" (2021)	"Smokin out the Window" (2021)

Silk Sonic singles chronology
"Leave the Door Open" (2021)	"Skate" (2021)	"Smokin out the Window" (2021)

Music video
- "Skate" on YouTube

"Skate" is a song by American superduo Silk Sonic, which consists of Bruno Mars and Anderson .Paak. It was released on July 30, 2021, by Aftermath Entertainment and Atlantic Records as the second single from their debut studio album An Evening with Silk Sonic (2021). The song was written by the artists alongside James Fauntleroy, Domi & JD Beck, and Dernst "D'Mile" Emile II, who produced it with Mars. An R&B, disco, and funk song, it was inspired by music from the 1970s disco period. The song's lyrics discuss roller skating and include an invitation to a dance floor.

"Skate" was well received by music critics, some of whom praised the retro 1970s sound and found it to be perfect for the summer. The song charted moderately in several countries; in North America, it reached number 14 on the Billboard Hot 100 and the top 20 in Canada. Elsewhere, the song topped the charts in Israel, peaked at number 12 in New Zealand and it also entered the top 20 Flanders region of Belgium. The accompanying music video was directed by Florent Dechard, Mars, and co-directed by Philippe Tayag, being released along with the song. It depicts Mars and .Paak performing the song outdoors in a tropical location as several women roller-skate around them. Silk Sonic performed the song during their concert residency An Evening with Silk Sonic at Park MGM (2022).

== Background ==
In late February 2021, Mars and .Paak announced on social media the formation of their new band Silk Sonic and revealed the artwork for their debut studio album An Evening with Silk Sonic (2021). On March 5 that year, they released their first single "Leave the Door Open". The duo teased new music in the months leading up to the release of "Skate". After performing "Leave the Door Open" at the BET Awards 2021, they tempted fans with a new song, which was later revealed to be "a hoax". On July 28, 2021, .Paak posted a picture of a red car with the phrase "You've Been Invited To Silk Sonic's Summertime Jam This Friday" on Twitter, hinting at an impending release.

In an interview with Zane Lowe on Apple Music 1's show New Music Daily, Mars said the track "came about as part of thought exercise in the studio" as he and his team were imagining they were performing a song "in the middle of a roller rink", and the way the bass, guitar, and drums would sound. Mars added; "And I wanted to play congas and that's what you get. You get a song called 'Skate'. Talking about I'm trying to float. I'm trying to glide." He affirmed that "Skate" was chosen as the second single "because the sun is out." Mars hoped that "Everybody's at the pool, at the beach, barbequing, listen to some Silk Sonic." Silk Sonic wanted people to "feel like they were floating and gliding, slipping and sliding."

== Release and production ==
On July 30, 2021, Aftermath Entertainment and Atlantic Records released "Skate" as the album's second single via digital download and streaming services in several countries. On the same date, Warner Music Group (WMG) also issued the track for radio airplay in Italy. On August 2, 2021, the track was sent to American adult contemporary, hot adult contemporary and modern adult contemporary radio stations. WMG released "Skate" to Australian contemporary hit radio on August 6, 2021.

"Skate" was written by Mars, Brandon Anderson, Dernst Emile II, James Fauntleroy, Domitille Degalle, and JD Beck. It was produced by Mars and D'Mile; Mars played sitar, guitar, congas, and percussion, while D'Mile sang background vocals, as well as playing Rhodes piano and bass guitar. .Paak played the drums and David Foreman played rhythm guitar. Glenn Fischbach played cello; Jonathan Kim and Steve Heitlinger played viola; Blake Espy, Emma Kummrow and Gared Crawford, Natasha Colkett, Tess Varley, and Luigi Mazzocchi played violin. Larry Gold did the arrangement and conduction of the strings at Milkboy Studios, Philadelphia, Pennsylvania, with co-arrangement by Steve Tirpak. The strings were recorded by Jeff Chestek, who was assisted by Cody Chicowski. Charles Moniz, with engineering assistant Alex Resoagli, engineered and recorded the song at Shampoo Press & Curl Studios. Serban Ghenea mixed "Skate" at MixStar Studios in Virginia Beach, John Hanes served as the mix engineer and Bryce Bordone as mixing assistant. The song was mastered by Randy Merrill at Sterling Sound, NYC.

== Composition ==
"Skate"
A 20-second sample of "Skate", where Mars sings the chorus of the '70s inspired soul-funk sound.

Musically, "Skate" is a disco, funk and R&B song. The song starts as "a high-drama anthem of stormy betrayal" and evolves "into a sunburst of roller-disco elation with a melody that could've owned any summer during the [President Gerald Ford] administration". Its instrumentation includes "rhythmic guitars, glockenspiel, Latin percussion, back-talking string section and the rising bridge" with a late '70s sound, as well as congas. "Skate" is described as a "horny track", due to its lyrics; .Paak sings at one point; "If being fine was a crime, girl, they'd lock your lil' fine ass up in a tower".

Sheet music for "Skate" is in the key of D minor with a tempo of 112 beats per minute. Paak "coos, booty-struck", on the later verses. On the bridge, Mars croons, while .Paak "opens up to the love interest" with a "raspy delivery". Silk Sonic shows "vintage vocal exhortations". The song's lyrics discuss roller skating, and are an invitation for young women to a dance floor.

"Skate" has been described as a "silky-smooth jam" and "groovy". Daniel Peters from NME described the track as "smooth and blissed" with Mars' and .Paak's vocals "harmonising on its upbeat refrain". Jason Lipshutz from Billboard called the song an "uptempo, beach-ready single". Lars Brandle, also writing for Billboard, said "Skate" has a "funky throwback '70s vibe". In a similar view, Scott Croker of Idolator said Silk Sonic issued "another dose of '70s nostalgia", describing the track as "a funky smooth tune". Clash's Robin Murray said the single was inspired by 1970s soul-funk and shares "a blissful, sunshine feel, tapping into that uplifting West Coast feeling". Charu Shina of Vulture also said the track was inspired by 1970s music and called it a "kind of smooth, funky summer jam". Consequence's staff and Mary Siroky described "Skate" as a "flashy, '70s jam" and a "euphoric groove with an absolutely unstoppable string section".

Lipshutz compared "Skate" to Mars's 2013 track "Treasure". Variety's Jem Aswad compared its sound to the "disco-era acts like Tavares and mid-tempo tracks from the Saturday Night Fever soundtrack [(1977)]". Jon Pareles of The New York Times said the song is a tentative of "recreating the sounds and structures of the era when 1970s soul melted into disco". Similarly, Sophie Caraan from Hypebeast said the duo take "structural cues from the smooth tunes of the '70s, adding layers of their harmonic vocals to pay homage" to the decade. Hot Press's Pat Carty said "Skate" sounds like a track produced by Gamble and Huff that could have been "included on a Car Wash sequel soundtrack".

== Critical reception ==
"Skate" was met with acclaim from music critics. Variety's Aswad said the song continues to show Silk Sonic's "loving tribute to the mid-1970s", calling it a "pitch-perfect throwback". Althea Legaspi of Rolling Stone said Mars and .Paak delivered with their promise of a "Summertime Jam" and noted the song's "buoyant, sunny vibes". Croker from Idolator dubbed "Skate" ""the perfect follow-up" to" 'Leave The Door Open'", and said listeners will have the song "on repeat on [their] Spotify". Vibe's Datwon Thomas said the duo "serve up another dance floor scorcher ... with that same ""sing-a-long feel" of" of 'Leave The Door Open' ", ultimately calling the track "stellar". Sabrina Park from Harper's Bazaar said "Skate" could "be our next favorite summer anthem", calling it a "certified bop".

Gabrielle Pierre, writing for NPR, praised Silk Sonic for their ability to "authentically reproduce sounds of Motown for today's contemporary audience, coupling modern melodies with classic retro rhythms and reverting to revered melodies, technique and instrumentation". Under the Radar's Mark Refern called the song an "irresistible slice of smooth retro soul". Shina of Vulture also said the song "holds up to repeated listening". Hypebeast writer Caraan opined the track was "one of the most infectious musical offerings of the year". Joe Walker, for HipHopDX, dubbed the song "infectious". Stereogum's staff praised the "effortless" song, saying that despite not bringing anything new, it is "pure early-disco cosplay" and "an irresistible late-summer shimmer".

When reviewing the album, Jon Dolan from Rolling Stone called "Skate" the "best song on the record". In a similar review, Variety's Aswad dubbed "Skate" a "rollerena anthem" and drew attention to the "priceless" verses such as "In a room full of dimes, you'd be a hundred dollars" and "You smell better than a barbecue". NME's Sophie Williams wrote; "there are gorgeously subtle flourishes throughout" the album that are evident on "the crisp, pristine blasts of percussion that uplift...'Skate'." Candace McDuffie, for Paste, said the song's sound "could have easily felt tired and redundant", but added there is "enough feel-good percussion and cheesy one-liners directed at a love interest to glisten and shine". Joe Rivers of No Ripcord said "Skate" is the disco song "you've heard a million times before, "but gains due to its "sheer enthusiasm". Sputnikmusic's Sowing praised the track, calling it "adorable" and "entertaining" while noting its romantic theme. Sowing also said the song includes "a slippery synth line" and humorous verses as it compares "the emotional space between the narrator and his partner to skaters drifting apart".

=== Accolades ===
Siroky and the staff of Consequence considered "Skate" the Top Song of the Week on July 30, 2021, saying the single "is the perfect late season bop, all the joyful energy of a cookout, rooftop party, or (naturally) a long skate session under palm trees". Stereogum's staff placed "Skate" among "The 5 Best Songs of the Week" on August 6, 2021, describing it as "deliriously sunny and specific Philly soul homage". The song was also included on Under the Radar's Songs of the Week on July 30, 2021; Redfern said, "It's incredibly cheesy ... but it's also hard to argue with such a joyous song."

== Commercial performance ==
"Skate" debuted at number 14 on the US Billboard Hot 100 with 13,000 downloads, 13.4 million streams, and 6.9 million radio impressions on its first tracking week. The song peaked at number 16 on the Adult Top 40 and peaked at number four on the Billboard Hot R&B/Hip-Hop Songs chart. It peaked at number 18 on the Mainstream Top 40 and 15 on the Rhythmic chart. The song debuted at number 11 on the US Rolling Stone Top 100. "Skate" entered and peaked at number 19 on the Canadian Hot 100 on the week of August 11, 2021. It also peaked at number 14 on the Canada Hot AC chart and number 19 on the Canada AC chart. It was certified platinum by Music Canada (MC).

In Israel, "Skate" peaked at number one on the week of August 8, 2021. On the New Zealand Singles Chart, the song debuted at number 12 on the week of August 9, 2021 and it was certified platinum by (RMNZ). In Australia, it debuted and peaked at number 32 on the ARIA Singles Chart. In Belgium, the single peaked at number 17 on the Ultratop 50 in Flanders and number 34 in Wallonia. It also peaked at number 17 on the Billboard Mexico Airplay chart, number 24 on the Dutch Top 40 chart, number 27 on the Billboard Japan Hot 100 chart and number 29 in Singapore. The track peaked at number 24 on Hungary Radios Top 40. "Skate" peaked at number 18 on the Billboard Global 200, spending six weeks on the chart.

== Music video ==
The music video for "Skate" was released alongside the song on July 30, 2021, and was directed by Mars and Florent Déchard, while co-directed by Philippe Tayag. The video is a "vintage visual" depicting Mars and .Paak playing drums that are backed by a band in an impromptu street party at a tropical outdoor location. At the same time, young women in shorts roller-skate around them. Cierra Chérie, one of the roller-skaters in the music video, did not know who the video they were filming was for until the day of the shoot. She said; “I learned a new level of excellence from Bruno Mars and Andy as well as some of the other roller skaters ... they were on the whole time ... they were ready to perform, they were high energy".

Variety's Aswad said the music video is "pitch-perfect" and "a carefree welcome tonic in a tough time". Thomas from Vibe said the video has a "high energy appeal". Legaspi from Rolling Stone called it "nostalgic, feel-good". Walker from HipHopDX also described the video as "feel-good". Writing for American Songwriter, Tina Benitez-Eves wrote the "vintage visuals fit the blissed-out funk and soul of Silk Sonic". USA Today's Jenna Ryu said the music video shows the "'70s feel-good nostalgia" so people "feel as if they're gliding, slipping and sliding into the summer". Park from Harper's Bazaar said the video takes viewers "into summer with its warm and inviting hues, harboring the familiar feel-good disco-R&B nostalgia with its '70s-inspired fashion and cinematographic moments".

== Personnel ==
Credits adapted from the liner notes of An Evening with Silk Sonic.

- Bruno Mars – vocals, songwriting, production, sitar, guitar, congas, percussion
- Anderson .Paak – vocals, songwriting, drums
- D'Mile – background vocals, songwriting, production, piano, Rhodes, bass
- James Fauntleroy – songwriting
- Domitille Degalle – songwriting
- JD Beck – songwriting
- David Foreman - rhythm guitar
- Larry Gold – strings arrangements and conducting
- Steve Tirpak – strings co-arrangements
- Emma Kummrow – violin
- Luigi Mazzocchi – violin
- Blake Espy – violin
- Gared Crawford – violin
- Tess Varley – violin
- Natasha Colkett – violin
- Jonathan Kim – viola
- Steve Heitliner – viola
- Glenn Fischbach – cello
- Jeff Chestek – strings recording
- Cody Chicowski – strings recording assistant
- Charles Moniz – recording, engineering
- Alex Resoagli – assistant engineer
- Serban Ghenea – mixing
- John Hanes – mixing engineering
- Bryce Bordone – mixing assistant
- Randy Merrill – mastering

== Charts ==
=== Weekly charts ===
List of chart positions
Chart (2021)	Peak position
Australia (ARIA)	32
Belgium (Ultratop 50 Flanders)	17
Belgium (Ultratop 50 Wallonia)	34
Brazil (Top 100 Brasil)	97
Canada Hot 100 (Billboard)	19
Canada AC (Billboard)	19
Canada CHR/Top 40 (Billboard)	27
Canada Hot AC (Billboard)	14
France (SNEP)	166
Global 200 (Billboard)	18
Hungary (Rádiós Top 40)	23
Ireland (IRMA)	48
Israel (Media Forest)	1
Japan Hot 100 (Billboard)	27
Lithuania (AGATA)	90
Mexico (Billboard Mexican Airplay)	17
Netherlands (Dutch Top 40)	24
Netherlands (Single Top 100)	61
New Zealand (Recorded Music NZ)	12
Portugal (AFP)	73
Singapore (RIAS)	29
South Korea (Gaon)	200
Sweden Heatseeker (Sverigetopplistan)	1
Switzerland (Schweizer Hitparade)	74
UK Singles (Official Charts)	45
US Billboard Hot 100	14
US Adult Contemporary (Billboard)	20
US Adult Pop Airplay (Billboard)	16
US Hot R&B/Hip-Hop Songs (Billboard)	4
US Pop Airplay (Billboard)	18
US Rhythmic Airplay (Billboard)	15
US Rolling Stone Top 100	11

=== Year-end charts ===
List of chart position
Chart (2021)	Position
US Hot R&B/Hip-Hop Songs (Billboard)	86

== Certifications ==
List of certifications
Region	Certification	Certified units/sales
Brazil (Pro-Música Brasil)	Platinum	40,000^{‡}
Canada (Music Canada)	Platinum	80,000^{‡}
New Zealand (RMNZ)	Platinum	30,000^{‡}
United Kingdom (BPI)	Silver	200,000^{‡}
^{‡} Sales+streaming figures based on certification alone.

== Release history ==
List of release history, showing region(s), date(s), format(s) and label(s)
Region	Date	Format(s)	Label(s)	Ref.
Various	July 30, 2021	Digital download; streaming	Aftermath; Atlantic	
Italy	July 30, 2021	Radio airplay	Warner	
United States	August 2, 2021	Adult contemporary radio	Atlantic	
United States	August 2, 2021	Hot adult contemporary radio	Atlantic	
United States	August 2, 2021	Modern adult contemporary radio	Atlantic	
Australia	August 6, 2021	Contemporary hit radio	Warner	
