= Smokin out the Window =

Single by Silk Sonic

from the album An Evening with Silk Sonic
- Released: November 5, 2021
- Recorded: 2017–2020
- Studio: Shampoo Press & Curl
- Genre: R&B; soul
- Length: 3:17
- Label: Aftermath; Atlantic
- Songwriters: Bruno Mars; Brandon Anderson; Dernst Emile II
- Producers: Bruno Mars; D'Mile

Bruno Mars singles chronology
"Skate" (2021)	"Smokin out the Window" (2021)	"Love's Train" (2022)

Anderson .Paak singles chronology
"Skate" (2021)	"Smokin out the Window" (2021)	"Love's Train" (2022)

Silk Sonic singles chronology
"Skate" (2021)	"Smokin out the Window" (2021)	"Love's Train" (2022)

Music video
- "Smokin Out The Window" on YouTube

"Smokin out the Window" is a song by American superduo Silk Sonic, which consists of Bruno Mars and Anderson .Paak. It was released on November 5, 2021, by Aftermath Entertainment and Atlantic Records as the third single from their debut studio album An Evening with Silk Sonic (2021). The song was written by the artists alongside Dernst "D'Mile" Emile II, who produced it with Mars. An R&B and soul song, it was inspired by music from the 1970s. The lyrics are humorous and describe the narrator's heart being broken by an unfaithful lover.

Music critics gave "Smokin out the Window" mixed reviews; some praised the duo's delivery while others criticized the song's "playful" lyrics. "Smokin Out The Window" reached the top five of the US Billboard Hot 100 and was certified twice-platinum by the Recording Industry Association of America (RIAA). It reached the top ten in Australia, Canada, Israel, New Zealand and Singapore. It was certified double platinum by Music Canada (MC) and by Recorded Music NZ (RMNZ).

The accompanying music video was directed by Mars and John Esparza, and was released along with the song. The video depicts Silk Sonic performing the song on "an old-school TV set"; at one point, .Paak pretends to "drop dead mid-performance". It won Video of the Year at the BET Awards 2022 and Video of the Year at the 2022 Soul Train Music Awards, whilst being nominated for Best Dance Performance. To promote "Smokin out the Window", Silk Sonic performed it at the American Music Awards of 2021 and 2021 Soul Train Music Awards, attracting praise for the duo vocal's ability and comparisons to a 1970s Soul Train telecast.

== Background ==
American singers Bruno Mars and Anderson .Paak met in 2017 while touring together on the European leg of Mars's 24K Magic World Tour (2017–18). Mars and .Paak were in a studio with Nile Rodgers and Guy Lawrence of Disclosure. The session, which took place after spending a week together, had no intent besides the duo's mutual appreciation and affection. During the tour, one of them began saying the phrase "Smoking out the Window"; they created an amusing, "stressed-out" man who smokes cigarettes as he tries to find his way out of "anxious" situations. According to Mars, the song "was an idea we started four or five years ago on tour. It didn't sound nothing like it does now, but we just had the 'Smokin Out The Window' idea". Once the tour ended, recording sessions were put on hold.

In February 2020, before the COVID-19 pandemic, Mars was listening to their recordings, which "hit the right chord" so he asked .Paak to join him in the studio. Mars said "Yo, I want to finish that song", to which .Paak replied "I'm drunk! What do you mean? Come on!". Despite being drunk, .Paak met Mars at the studio. During the song-making session .Paak said: "I'm the king of R&B! Tell me I ain't the hottest in the game!" When they started to write the song, a competitive, friendly spirit emerged as they tried to improve on the work. Once they finished the song .Paak said; "I'm out, what we doing tomorrow?" According to Mars, it was the first song he and .Paak wrote together.

== Production and release ==
"Smokin Out The Window" was written by Mars, .Paak and Dernst Emile II. The track was produced by Mars and D'Mile; Mars played guitar and was in charge of the percussion, while D'Mile played bass and piano. Ella Feingold played the vibraphone and Bootsy Collins's voice was recorded by Tobe Donohue at Rehab Studio in Cincinnati, Ohio. Homer Steinweiss played drums, which were recorded by Jens Jungkurth at The Legendary Diamond Mine, Long Island City, New York. In the horn section, Kameron Whalum played trombone, Marc Franklin played trumpet, Kirk Smothers played alto and bari saxophone, and Lannie McMillan played tenor saxophone. These were recorded by Boo Mitchell at Royal Studios in Memphis, Tennessee. Blake Espy, Emma Kummrow and Christopher Jusell played violin with Natasha Colkett, Tess Varley and Luigi Mazzocchi. Jonathan Kim and Yoshihiko Nakano played viola and Glenn Fischbach played cello. Larry Gold arranged and conducted strings at Milkboy Studios, Philadelphia, Pennsylvania, while Jeff Chestek recorded. Charles Moniz, with engineering assistant Alex Resoagli, engineered and recorded the song at Shampoo Press & Curl Studios. Serban Ghenea mixed "Smokin Out The Window" at MixStar Studios in Virginia Beach; John Hanes served as the mix engineer and Bryce Bordone as mixing assistant. The track was mastered by Randy Merrill at Sterling Sound, NYC.

On November 5, 2021, "Smokin Out The Window" was released by Aftermath Entertainment and Atlantic Records as the third single from An Evening with Silk Sonic in several countries via digital download and streaming services. On the same date, Warner Music Group issued the track for radio airplay in Italy. On November 8, 2021, Atlantic sent the track to American adult contemporary, hot adult contemporary and modern adult contemporary radio stations, and a day later to US contemporary hit radio. On January 28, 2022, a CD single with the original version of the song was released in several countries. "Smokin Out The Window" was also included on Mars's first compilation album, Collaborations (2026).

== Composition ==
"Smokin Out The Window"
A 20-second sample of "Smokin Out The Window", where .Paak sings the chorus line about Silk Sonic's unfaithful lover.

"Smokin out the Window" is a R&B and soul song. The track features a key change in its structure. It has been described as a "buttery ballad", a "requisite breakup song" and "smooth". Jacob Uitti writing for American Songwriter said the song draws inspiration from the 1970s sound and that Silk Sonic sing "about the realization that a lover is not being faithful and has many other men on the side". The lyrics are about a man who has pampered a woman too much, and she is using the man and having relationships with other men. Paak croons as he recalls a former lover, singing "Just the other night she was gripping on me tight, screaming 'Hercules!' ", and "drawing out the melody over a weighty bassline".

Jon Dolan from Rolling Stone noted the song's "deceptively" title as it tells the story of a "stressed-out boyfriend" complaining about his girlfriend's "badass kids" and "a jam with her ex-man in the UFC". Entertainment Weekly's Leah Greenblatt said "Even Casanovas get the blues, though; "Smoking Out the Window" pines prettily for a girl who can't stop stepping out." According to Wongo Okon writing for Uproxx, Silk Sonic show their "spite towards a former lover that walked out of them" [sic], and the single "finds Bruno and .Paak venting about their former lovers' actions". Jon Pareles of The New York Times said the song is "bitter but still lovelorn song about a gold-digger ex". Erika Marie from HotNewHipHop said Silk Sonic are "dealing with women whose demands are stressing them out".

Ross Scarano from Pitchfork described the song as a "heartbroken lament". Billboard's Jason Lipshutz called it "an amiable slow jam with a slightly higher spring in its step than "Leave the Door Open". Elijah Watson of Okayplayer found similarities between "Smokin Out The Window" and "Leave the Door Open" due to its "steady and downtempo groove". Watson said the track details an ended relationship, and finds Mars and .Paak "heartbroken and hurt"; Watson also said the song sounds sad but most of the lyrics are funny, and the "scenarios the pair's lovers have put them in leav[e] them stressed out".

== Critical reception ==
"Smokin Out The Window" was met with mixed reviews from most music critics. Regina Cho writing for Revolt praised the duo, who "bounce off of each other's energy perfectly as soon as the opening drums hit". Dolan stated the track shows a "lovingly winking post-hip-hop playfulness". Devon Jefferson of HipHopDX found the song to be Silk Sonic's "new groove". In a mixed review, Lipshutz complemented Silk Sonic's "smooth move" with "Smokin Out The Window" and despite their new songs enhancing each other's "solid-gold impulses, their chemistry now sounds like a foregone conclusion". Paste's Candace McDuffie criticized the song's "playful lyricism that borders on parody" but said Silk Sonic "hyperbolic" delivery saves the track. In a negative review, Hot Press's Pat Carty said the single "has its tongue so firmly in its cheek, it's poking clean through" and labeled it "as groovy as a country lane". Scarano did not enjoy the track, saying "this is a cartoon revival of a well-worn aesthetic".

=== Accolades ===
Billboard magazine listed "Smokin Out The Window" as one of the year's best songs and placed at number 63 on its list of the "100 Best Songs of 2021". Rania Aniftos wrote; "the success of 'Smokin Out The Window' can be attributed to the fact that Silk Sonic can make calling a woman 'this b—h' weirdly attractive". Vibe's staff placed "Smokin Out The Window" among "picks for the songs you should check out" on November 5, 2021, and Mya Abraham describing it as a "hilarious jam ... and it's just perfect. The song is a hoot". The song was also included on Under the Radar's Songs of the Week on November 5, 2021; Redfern said; "Smoking Out the Window is another winning and smooth retro '70s soul cut featuring amusing lyrics". "Smokin Out The Window" received a nomination for Favorite R&B Song at the American Music Awards of 2022. At the 2023 iHeartRadio Music Awards, the single was nominated for R&B Song of the Year.

== Commercial performance ==
"Smokin Out The Window" debuted at number eight on the US Billboard Hot 100 with 21 million streams, 5.9 million radio impressions and 9,300 downloads on its first tracking week. The following week, the single peaked at number five on the Billboard Hot 100 with 23.8 million streams and 13.7 million in airplay audience. The song debuted at its peak of number two on the Billboard Hot R&B/Hip-Hop Songs chart and eventually topped the Rhythmic chart. The Recording Industry Association of America (RIAA) certified it twice-platinum. "Smokin Out The Window" peaked at number 10 on the Canadian Hot 100 chart, having charted at number 23 on November 29, 2021. Music Canada (MC) certified it double platinum.

In Israel, "Smokin Out The Window" peaked at number five on the week of December 19, 2021. On the New Zealand Singles Chart, the song debuted at number ten on November 15, 2021, and peaked at number four the following week. Recorded Music NZ (RMNZ) certified it double platinum. In Australia, the song charted at number 34 on November 21, 2011 and peaked at number eight on the ARIA Singles Chart the next week. The single peaked at number 11 in Denmark and Ireland. In the United Kingdom, the song peaked at number 12 on the UK Singles Chart. The track debuted at number 53 on the Portuguese Singles Chart and peaked at number 15. "Smokin Out The Window" peaked at number eight on the Billboard Global 200.

== Music video ==
Mars performing on "an old-school TV set" with backup singers in a shot from the music video.

On November 1, 2021, Silk Sonic teased their fans by tweeting a muted clip of a music video showing Silk Sonic driving a "retro-looking card" as they sing vocals while smoking and eating pizza. However, the clip lip-synced the second chorus of the song. The official music video for "Smokin Out The Window" was released alongside the song on November 5, 2021, and was directed by Mars and John Esparza.

In the retro 70's retro "stylized like a vintage television performance" music video, the duo is wearing wide "old-school" lapel tuxedo jackets. They perform a choreography on an old-school TV set, in which the stage is decorated with large light-up stars, alongside backup singers and a band. During their performance .Paak and Mars are singing and smoking cigarettes. At one point, the former pretends to "drop dead mid-performance".

Cho praised the duo saying they showcased their "performance skills". Watson affirmed the duo looks "incredibly dapper". The music video for "Smokin Out The Window" won Video of the Year at the BET Awards 2022, in a tie with Baby Keem and Kendrick Lamar's "Family Ties" (2021). At the 2022 Soul Train Music Awards, the clip won Video of the Year, whilst being nominated for Best Dance Performance.

== Live performances and other uses ==
On November 21, 2021, Silk Sonic performed "Smokin Out The Window" live for the first time as the opening act of the American Music Awards of 2021. Silk Sonic wore velvet red-suits and sunglasses, and their live band included "backing vocalists, a trumpet player, and saxophonist". The act, which drew inspiration from the 1970s, included "retro dance moves, glowing stage lights, big sunglasses" and "the hints of chest hair". David Renshaw, writing for The Fader, considered Sonic's act one of the best of the show because they opened the ceremony "in smooth fashion". Curto said Silk Sonic's performance was one of the highlights of the ceremony; he complemented the duo's "vocal runs" and their "silky smoothness". Billboard's Carl Lamarre praised the duo's "velvety smooth vocal" and "shifty footwork". ET Canada wrote Silk Sonic demonstrated "swagger and flawless vocals", and "set the bar high for the rest of tonight's performers". Ryan Reed from Rolling Stone called the performance "ultra-smooth".

A week later, Silk Sonic opened the 2021 Soul Train Music Awards at Apollo Theater in New York with two pre-recorded performances: "Fly as Me" and the show-closer "Smokin Out The Window". The duo decided to pay "homage to Soul Train's height" and performed "Smokin Out The Window " with the "iconic Soul Train backdrop", restating "the set of the old TV show". Silk Sonic wore "white blazers, white shirts and black slacks" as they performed alongside their live band. Vulture's Bethy Squires found the set to be "lovingly redone" and called it "gorgeous". Prezzy Brown Vibe found the duo were "controlling the crowd and taking ownership of the stage". Debbie Carr writing for NME dubbed their act "grin-inducing" and "vintage-influenced". Mars and .Paak also performed "Smokin Out The Window" during their concert residency An Evening with Silk Sonic at Park MGM (2022). In 2022, Mars sung the track as part of a medley during his Bruno Mars Live (2022-2024) setlist. On October 2024, during his Brazilian leg he replaced "Smokin out the Window" on the medley with "Die With a Smile".

== Personnel ==
Credits adapted from the liner notes of An Evening with Silk Sonic.

- Bruno Mars – vocals, songwriting, production, guitar, percussion
- Anderson .Paak – vocals, songwriting
- Bootsy Collins – vocals
- D'Mile – songwriting, production, bass, piano
- Homer Steinweiss – drums
- Ella Feingold – vibraphone
- Kameron Whalum – trombone
- Marc Franklin – trumpet
- Kirk Smothers – alto, bari sax
- Lannie McMillan – tenor sax
- Larry Gold – strings conduction, arrangement
- Emma Kummrow – violin
- Luigi Mazzocchi – violin
- Blake Espy – violin
- Christopher Jusell – violin
- Tess Varley – violin
- Natasha Colkett – violin
- Jonathan Kim – viola
- Yoshihiko Nakano – viola
- Glenn Fischbach – cello
- Boo Mitchell – horns recording
- Tobe Donohue – vocal recording of Bootsy Collins
- Jens Jungkurth – drums recording
- Jeff Chestek – strings recording
- Charles Moniz – recording, engineering
- Alex Resoagli – engineering assistant
- Serban Ghenea – mixing
- John Hanes – mixing engineering
- Bryce Bordone – mixing assistant
- Randy Merrill – mastering

== Charts ==
=== Weekly charts ===
List of chart positions
Chart (2021–2022)	Peak position
Argentina Hot 100 (Billboard)	85
Australia (ARIA)	8
Belgium (Ultratop 50 Flanders)	24
Belgium (Ultratop 50 Wallonia)	36
Brazil (Top 10 Pop Internacional)	5
Canada Hot 100 (Billboard)	10
Canada CHR/Top 40 (Billboard)	36
Canada Hot AC (Billboard)	35
Denmark (Tracklisten)	11
Global 200 (Billboard)	8
France (SNEP)	150
Ireland (IRMA)	11
Israel (Media Forest)	5
Japan (Japan Hot 100)	56
Lithuania (AGATA)	22
Mexico (Billboard Mexican Airplay)	49
Netherlands (Dutch Top 40)	32
Netherlands (Single Top 100)	31
New Zealand (Recorded Music NZ)	4
Norway (VG-lista)	26
Portugal (AFP)	15
San Marino (SMRRTV Top 50)	21
Singapore (RIAS)	8
South Africa (RISA)	25
Sweden (Sverigetopplistan)	55
Switzerland (Schweizer Hitparade)	34
UK Singles (Official Charts)	12
US Billboard Hot 100	5
US Adult Pop Airplay (Billboard)	14
US Hot R&B/Hip-Hop Songs (Billboard)	2
US Pop Airplay (Billboard)	15
US Rhythmic Airplay (Billboard)	1

=== Year-end charts ===
List of chart positions
Chart (2022)	Position
Global 200 (Billboard)	150
US Billboard Hot 100	41
US Hot R&B/Hip-Hop Songs (Billboard)	11
US Rhythmic (Billboard)	17

== Certifications ==
List of certifications
Region	Certification	Certified units/sales
Brazil (Pro-Música Brasil)	Platinum	40,000^{‡}
Canada (Music Canada)	2× Platinum	160,000^{‡}
Denmark (IFPI Danmark)	Gold	45,000^{‡}
New Zealand (RMNZ)	2× Platinum	60,000^{‡}
Portugal (AFP)	Gold	5,000^{‡}
United Kingdom (BPI)	Gold	400,000^{‡}
United States (RIAA)	2× Platinum	2,000,000^{‡}
^{‡} Sales+streaming figures based on certification alone.

== Release history ==
List of release history, showing region(s), date(s), format(s) and label(s)
Region	Date	Format(s)	Label	Ref.
Various	November 5, 2021	Digital download; streaming	Aftermath; Atlantic	
Italy	November 5, 2021	Radio airplay	Warner	
United States	November 8, 2021	Adult contemporary radio	Atlantic	
United States	November 8, 2021	Hot adult contemporary radio	Atlantic	
United States	November 8, 2021	Modern adult contemporary radio	Atlantic	
United States	November 9, 2021	Contemporary hit radio	Atlantic	
Various	January 28, 2022	CD single	Aftermath; Atlantic	
