= An Evening with Silk Sonic =

Studio album by Silk Sonic
- Released: November 12, 2021
- Recorded: 2020–2021
- Studios: Shampoo Press & Curl (Los Angeles)
- Genres: R&B; soul; funk; hip-hop; pop
- Length: 31:19
- Labels: Aftermath; Atlantic
- Producers: Bruno Mars; D'Mile; The Stereotypes

Bruno Mars chronology
24K Magic (2016)	An Evening with Silk Sonic (2021)	The Romantic (2026)

Anderson .Paak chronology
Ventura (2019)	An Evening with Silk Sonic (2021)	Why Lawd? (2024)

Singles from An Evening with Silk Sonic
- 1. "Leave the Door Open" Released: March 5, 2021; 2. "Skate" Released: July 30, 2021; 3. "Smokin out the Window" Released: November 5, 2021; 4. "After Last Night" Released: July 5, 2022

An Evening with Silk Sonic is the debut studio album by the American musical superduo Silk Sonic, which is composed of the American singer-songwriter Bruno Mars and fellow singer and rapper Anderson .Paak. The album was released by Aftermath Entertainment and Atlantic Records on November 12, 2021. Silk Sonic recruited the American musician Bootsy Collins—who came up with the name for Mars's and Paak's duo—for the narration, and American record producer D'Mile to compose the album. Recording sessions took place from early 2020 to mid-2021 at Shampoo Press & Curl Studios in Los Angeles.

Several critics said An Evening with Silk Sonic was crafted from elements of R&B, soul, funk, hip-hop, and pop music. Silk Sonic were inspired to create an album on which they could capture the sound of the 1960s and 1970s. Their main goal was to bring people together and make them feel good. The lyrics explore themes—such as seduction, romance, reconciliation, and materialism—that were featured on Mars's previous albums. While .Paak's lyrics usually address contemporary matters, such as the social tensions resulting from identity, politics, self-expression, and repression, those specific issues are not addressed on this record.

An Evening with Silk Sonic debuted at number two on the Billboard 200 chart, with first-week sales of 104,000 equivalent album units and became Mars's second and .Paak's first number-one album on the US Top R&B/Hip-Hop Albums chart. The album was certified platinum by the Recording Industry Association of America (RIAA). It also peaked in the top-five in Australia, Canada, and New Zealand, and produced five singles: "Leave the Door Open" and "Smokin out the Window", which were commercially successful, "Skate", which charted moderately, and "Love's Train" and "After Last Night", which both had minor commercial success. "Leave the Door Open" reached number one on the Billboard Hot 100, becoming Mars's eighth and .Paak's first number-one song in the United States, as well as reaching number one in Israel, Malaysia, and New Zealand.

An Evening with Silk Sonic received widespread acclaim from music critics. It is the most acclaimed studio album of Mars's career and .Paak's second most—after Malibu—per Metacritic. Reviewers praised the collaborative album's retro sensibility and the chemistry between Mars and .Paak. At the 2022 Grammy Awards, "Leave the Door Open" won four Grammy Awards, including Record of the Year, Song of the Year, Best R&B Performance, and Best R&B Song. Several publications listed the album as one of the best records of the year, and Billboard named it the seventh-best album of 2021. The album was also promoted via the concert residency An Evening with Silk Sonic at Park MGM (2022), along with a number of performances at various award shows.

== Background ==
Bruno Mars and Anderson .Paak met in 2017 while touring together on the European leg of Mars's 24K Magic World Tour (2017–2018). The two were seen in the studio working with Nile Rodgers and Guy Lawrence of Disclosure. They quickly became friends and decided to collaborate. In an interview with the New Zealand radio DJ Zane Lowe for radio station Apple Music 1, Mars said that most of the album is "rooted in [.Paak's] drum beats". He continued, saying that he works "backward from the guitar or piano", whereas .Paak's "music is percussion-driven, derived from old-school Motown influence." They credit each other for the sound that models Silk Sonic. According to American record producer and songwriter D'Mile, Silk Sonic became a project after he, Mars, and .Paak worked on a song together.

.Paak says Mars considers every detail of a song, such as its theme, its sounds, and how it would engage people with the chorus, while .Paak is more of a free form, perceptive, and "What's the vibe?" musician. The latter affirmed that they were inspired by the 1960s, 1970s, and "the old school". According to Mars, they reunited in the studio during the night to drink and play music they enjoy. .Paak said the duo was influenced by Aretha Franklin, James Brown, Miles Davis, Stevie Wonder, and Prince. The duo "bonded over their love of classic soul" and would usually play for each other songs they loved. .Paak was not sure the project would become a reality if the COVID-19 pandemic had not occurred, since they would have otherwise been playing shows at that time.

Silk Sonic decided not to address the police killings and the pandemic in their music. Mars further, "A good song can bring people together...so that was our mindset with the whole album. If it makes us feel good, and resonates with us, that's gonna be infectious and make other people feel good." .Paak said that both of them have suffered a lot during their lives and this album is their way to cope with it. Nevertheless, Silk Sonic recorded a track with "heavier" substance, but Mars was uncertain if he wanted to include the song. When they finished the session, Mars first played the recording for himself and when .Paak listened to it they decided to reject it. Mars has mixed every album he released since his debut, by listening to it in his Cadillac CTS to know how it would play in "real-world scenario".

== Recording ==
In early 2017, after .Paak and Mars met on tour, they decided to get together in the studio with no intent, besides their mutual appreciation and affection. At this point, the duo decided to try to turn the "backstage in-jokes" into songs. The first thing they wrote together started with one of them saying the sentence "Smoking out the window". They imagined a "stressed-out" man smoking too many cigarettes, as he tried to find his way out of "anxious" situations, and saying this phrase. When they got together in the studio, the "joke" was turned into a hook. Once the tour ended, the sessions were put on hold.

In February 2020, Mars was listening to what they recorded, and "it hit the right chord". So, he called .Paak to join him in the studio. It was the latter's birthday but, despite being drunk, he met with Mars. When they started to write a song, "a competitive" but a friendly spirit emerged as they were trying to improve on the work. .Paak affirmed that, despite the COVID-19 pandemic, they decided to get together in the studio instead of "trying to make music long-distance". In the studio, the duo would jam, trying to understand how to make people feel good with the songs they created from scratch and what was missing on the tracks, having to recreate a song from scratch at times. Mars and .Paak tried to create a dream setlist, they dubbed it as "the setlist of doom". However, they needed someone who could "thread" all the songs. They both admired American musician and singer Bootsy Collins, who not only came up with the name for Mars's and Paak's duo but also hosted the album.

Mars reunited with frequent collaborators, the American songwriter and producer Brody Brown and the Canadian recording engineer Charles Moniz, to record An Evening with Silk Sonic. Mars found D'Mile on Instagram and heard his composition on Lucky Daye's debut studio album, Painted (2019). Then, he asked the American singer-songwriter James Fauntleroy to get in touch with the producer. Once in the studio, D'Mile wanted to make a good impression by finishing the track that Mars had started and do nothing else until he completed it. However, the latter told him "we're here all the time. I would love for you to come rock with us." D'Mile became one of the core composers of the album. The duo also worked with the American rapper and record producer Dr. Dre, who gave feedback on the project. Homer Steinweiss, the drummer of the Dap-Kings, who had previously worked with Mars on Unorthodox Jukebox (2012) and 24K Magic (2016), also contributed to the album by playing drums on a song.

To achieve the sound they were aiming for, Silk Sonic and Moniz had to reach out to elderly "session guys" and read "old drumming magazines". They needed the right gear, such as Ludwig Drums with Remo Ambassador heads, Giovanni Hidalgo congas, a Hohner Clavinet D6 keyboard, a Danelectro sitar, a Trophy Music mini-Glockenspiel, and a Solid State Logic mixing board. Afterward, they were "emulating old-school playing styles and recording them", using one or two mics and several musicians playing at the same time in the same place. Despite having all the instruments to re-create the sound they were not able to do so at that time. According to .Paak, they were "fucking bashing!", while the ones that came before them were "tiptoeing".

Silk Sonic disclosed their process when re-working a small section of a song that pays tribute to Philadelphia soul and features a "string section and a sampled rainstorm". Its lyrics detail a heartbreak and how to deal with it afterwards. Mars, D'Mile, and .Paak heard each instrument isolated and realized that the drums were not adequate. .Paak replayed the drum section for 20 minutes, as Mars and D'Mile gave their reactions. Once the drumline was established, Mars turned their attention to the piano section, which took ten minutes for them to find an arrangement everyone enjoyed. According to D'Mile, all the tracks they came up with are included on the album, except for one. Some songs on the album would have various versions that D'Mile liked, but Mars would be unhappy with. So, they would remix it so that everyone, from Mars to the engineer's assistant, liked it. An Evening with Silk Sonic was recorded at Shampoo Press & Curl Studios in Los Angeles.

== Composition ==
"Leave the Door Open"
A 25-second sample of the lead single "Leave the Door Open". Portion of the chorus which features key changes.

An Evening with Silk Sonic explores several genres, including R&B, soul, funk, early hip-hop, and pop. The album includes the R&B ballads "After Last Night" and "Leave the Door Open". "Fly as Me" and "777" are both funk tracks, with the latter demonstrating a "rock-leaning" style. "Smokin out the Window" and "Put on a Smile" are heartbreak songs, with the latter being a power ballad. An Evening with Silk Sonic also features disco on the track "Skate". "Love's Train" is a funk and soul cover of the Con Funk Shun song of the same name. The last track on the album, "Blast Off", is a psychedelic soul song evoking Earth, Wind & Fire in 1979. According to Stereogum's Vivek Maddala, Silk Sonic created "new paths compositionally" with "Blast Off". Its "underlying musical architecture contains many surprises, and even some harmonic innovations—things".

"Leave the Door Open", "Smokin out the Window", "After Last Night", "Put on a Smile", and "Blast Off" all feature key changes that have been praised by various critics. Album lyrics address topics featured in Mars's previous albums, such as "seduction, romance", reconciliation, and materialism. While .Paak's lyrics usually address contemporary matters—such as "the tensions of identity, desire, success, politics, self-expression and repression"—these are not represented on the record.

The album opens with "Silk Sonic Intro", where the duo shows their intention of "locking the groove" and it features guest vocals by Bootsy Collins. The duo's lead single, "Leave the Door Open", is inspired by the sound of the Spinners, the Stylistics, and the Manhattans. Its lyrics are an "erotic invitation" from the singer to a woman, encouraging her to come over to his house. "Fly as Me" is a track inspired by James Brown and Parliament, but with a modern approach. Mars performs a "simplistic bold chorus", while .Paak raps "hollering from a 1977 Monte Carlo." The latter's "assertive drumming" was compared to that on the compilation albums Ultimate Breaks and Beats. The song's lyrics are a "celebration of proud extravagance and wealth." The slow jam of "After Last Night" describes a woman who is "sweet-sticky/thick and pretty" and able to make a "player try on monogamy". It also shows the duo departing from their "player lifestyle" following a pleasurable date.

"Smokin out the Window" is a R&B and soul song. It draws inspiration from the 1970s sound, and Silk Sonic sing "about the realization that a lover is not being faithful and has many other men on the side". "Put On a Smile" opens with a vocal intro by Collins and "sounds of a thunderstorm". Its lyrics detail the duo's "confession of desperate heartache", as they try "to overcome life after losing someone" they were "deeply in love with". Ross Scarano, from Pitchfork, and Caleb Campbell, writing for Under the Radar, draw attention to the similarities between the song and the Miracles's "The Tracks of My Tears" (1965). Various critics praised Mars's falsetto vocals. Alex Rigotti, of Gigwise, mentioned the falsetto "register with a high G" and the singer's control of his croon, belt, and scream. He also exalted .Paak's drumming. Sowing, of Sputnikmusic, praised Mars for laying everything on the "elongated" and "powerfully delivered" verse "Lord knows I'm dyin".

The seventh track, "777", shares the same inspiration as that of "Fly as Me", from James Brown, Parliament, and the "assertive drumming" on the Ultimate Breaks and Beats. It has been compared to the Gap Band's funk. It describes partying and going to Las Vegas "where the champagne buffet always flows and nobody loses at the baccarat table". "Skate", the album's second single, was inspired by music from the 1970s' disco period. The song's lyrics discuss roller skating, and are an invitation for young women to a dance floor. The album's final song, "Blast Off", includes an "unhinged guitar solo" leading to "twinkling electric pianos" as it finishes. Its composition makes the listener feel like they are flying in the clouds and in space. The lyrics call for "high-as-space imagery", achieved through the use of drugs. The bonus track, "Love's Train", is a "silky and smooth" 1970s funk and soul song. Lyrically, it displays "a love triangle Michael Cooper and Felton Pilate found themselves in".

== Release and promotion ==
On February 26, 2021, Mars and .Paak announced they had recorded an album together under the band name Silk Sonic. The band's debut album was titled An Evening with Silk Sonic, featuring American musician Bootsy Collins as a special guest host. At the same time, the artwork was revealed and is a retro sketch of the two floating heads that reads, "An evening with Silk Sonic ... with special guest host Bootsy Collins". They also announced the release of the first single the following week, along with the album title.

"Leave the Door Open" was released in various countries, as the first single. On the same date, "Silk Sonic Intro" was also issued, featuring the album's special guest Bootsy Collins. Silk Sonic performed "Leave the Door Open" live for the first time at the 63rd Annual Grammy Awards on March 14, 2021; their performance received critical acclaim from music critics. They also performed it live at the 2021 iHeartRadio Music Awards on May 27, 2021. Consequence's Nina Corcoran called the performance "mesmerizing". Joe Lynch, from Billboard, praised Silk Sonic's performance as they, "worked the crowd exactly like the '70s soul singers that Silk Sonic pays homage to would have." A month later, the duo performed "Leave the Door Open" at the BET Awards 2021. On July 30, 2021, "Skate" was issued as the second single.

Initially, Mars and .Paak stated that the album would be released in the fall of 2021. However, its release was delayed to January 2022, as they wanted to include more songs. Despite their previous scheduling, on October 8, 2021, coinciding with Mars's birthday, Silk Sonic announced the album's release date of November 12, 2021. On the same date, the record was made available for pre-saves and for pre-order via Mars's official site, with four purchasing options. On October 29, the digital marketing agency Get Engaged confirmed that they were working on campaigns to promote the album. On November 5, a week before the album release, Silk Sonic revealed the track list for their album. On November 10, two days before the release of the album, at an event hosted by Spotify, Silk Sonic premiered several songs at West Hollywood's Peppermint Club for a select group of people. On November 21, 2021, the duo performed "Smokin out the Window" at the American Music Awards of 2021. One week later, Silk Sonic sang "Fly as Me" and "Smokin Out the Window" at the 2021 Soul Train Music Awards. The song "777" appeared in a commercial for AirPods after the release of the album.

On February 14, 2022, the duo released a cover of Con Funk Shun's "Love's Train" (1982) as a commemorative song for Valentine's Day. Silk Sonic embarked on their concert residency, An Evening with Silk Sonic at Park MGM, which started on February 25, 2022, held at the Park Theater, in the Park MGM in Las Vegas. At the 64th Annual Grammy Awards in 2022, the duo performed "777" as the opening act. The duo performed their cover version of "Love's Train" at the 2022 Billboard Music Awards.

On August 26, 2022, An Evening With Silk Sonic was released on vinyl, nine months after its initial release. The standard vinyl version included the same songs as the original release, and the webstore exclusive included "Love's Train" as a bonus track. In the latter version, "Love's Train" is the ninth track of the album, while "Blast Off" is placed as the tenth song. An exclusive alternate cover vinyl was made available to purchase only at Target. A different version with a yellow vinyl was made available to purchase only at Walmart.

=== Singles ===
"Leave the Door Open" was released as the album's lead single on March 5, 2021, along with its music video. The song was generally well received; reviewers complimented both singers' vocals, as well as the song's composition. It was listed by several publications, including Billboard and Complex, as being among the best songs of the year. The recording was a success, topping the charts in the United States, Israel, and New Zealand, and reaching the top ten in several other countries, including Australia, Belgium (Flanders and Wallonia), Canada, and Portugal.

"Skate" was released as the album's second single on July 30, 2021, along with its music video. The single received critical acclaim from music critics, who mentioned the track's "summer vibes", in addition to the "funky" influences of the 1970s. It charted moderately, reaching number 14 on the Billboard Hot 100, number 12 in New Zealand, and topping the charts in Israel.

"Smokin out the Window" was released as the album's third single on November 5, 2021, alongside its music video. The song reached the top five in the United States and New Zealand, as well as top twenty in several other countries, including Australia, Canada, Denmark, and the United Kingdom.

A cover version of Con Funk Shun's "Love's Train" was first released on February 14, 2022, to digital stores and streaming services. It was later confirmed as the record's fourth single by Billboard with a radio release date of March 18, 2022, in Italy. The single received critical acclaim from music critics, who praised Mars's and .Paak's vocals and their commitment to the original version of the song. It spent 13 weeks on the top spot of the Billboard Adult R&B Songs chart.

"After Last Night" was only released as a single to American urban adult contemporary radio stations on July 5, 2022. Its charting was influenced by the release of its parent album, An Evening with Silk Sonic. It topped the Billboard Adult R&B Songs chart, becoming the fourth single of Silk Sonic's debut album to do so. This achievement led An Evening with Silk Sonic to become the second album with four number-one singles on the chart, tying with Toni Braxton's self-titled studio album (1993).

== Critical reception ==
An Evening with Silk Sonic ratings
Aggregate scores
Source	Rating
AnyDecentMusic?	8.0/10
Metacritic	83/100
Review scores
Source	Rating
AllMusic	3.5/5 stars
Clash	8/10
Entertainment Weekly	B+
Exclaim!	9/10
The Independent	4/5 stars
NME	5/5 stars
Paste	7.4/10
Pitchfork	6.4/10
Rolling Stone	4/5 stars
Sputnikmusic	4.5/5

An Evening with Silk Sonic received widespread acclaim from music critics upon release. At Metacritic, which assigns a normalized rating out of 100 to reviews from professional publications, the album received an average score of 83, based on 15 reviews, indicating "universal acclaim". It is the most acclaimed studio album of Mars' career and .Paak's second most, after Malibu, according to the website. Aggregator AnyDecentMusic? gave An Evening with Silk Sonic 8.0 out of 10, based on their assessment of the critical consensus.

Sophie Williams of NME rated the record five out of five stars. Williams said "the songs are radiant and full of joy. The album glows with appreciation for the simple but irreplaceable power of working alongside someone you trust and respect like no other." Writing for Variety, Jem Aswad concurred, "Wisely, the album doesn't outstay its welcome...the vibe carries through from end to end – and once it's over there's no way you're not playing it again." Mary Siroky of Consequence said, "every track hits, and this album will certainly leave people clamoring for more". Sowing, writing for Sputnikmusic, gave the album four-and-a-half stars out of five and complimented it, "An Evening With Silk Sonic lives up to its billing as a true experience: it's sexy, ever-so-smooth, and radiates confidence and charisma...An Evening With Silk Sonic marks the pinnacle of Mars's and .Paak's respective musical careers." Exclaim!'s A. Harmony praised An Evening with Silk Sonic, "It's an efficient half-hour endeavour where every song...sounds like the grand finale of an epic live production."

Alex Rigotti from Gigwise rated the album 9 out of 10 stars. Rigotti said, "Bruno Mars and Anderson .Paak team up for one of the best albums of the year." Campbell from Under the Radar wrote, "In the world of Silk Sonic, the champagne never stops flowing, the grooves go all night long, and everybody is having a great time. Take the trip back in time and you'll find escapist pop at its finest". Leah Greenblatt from Entertainment Weekly gave An Evening with Silk Sonic a B+ and stated that Silk Sonic "just want to take you out for a superfly Evening, and send you home basking in the afterglow." Reviewing the record for Rolling Stone, Jon Dolan rated it four stars out of five. Dolan said "the result is the most enjoyable record Mars has been a part of – a glorious excuse to turn out the lights, break out the bubbly and let the sublime power of their almost troublingly uncanny retro verisimilitude work its mimetic magic."

Tani Levitt of Clash wrote, "That the groove will be locked down is never in question...the only question is whether you or the unnamed love interest are joining them. And you should." In a positive review, Roisin O'Connor from The Independent gave it four stars out of five, saying, "Yes, it's all cheesy as a vat of fondue. But it's also a lot of fun." The New York Times's Jon Parales said, "[Mars and Paak] sound like they're having a great time. Silk Sonic comes across as a continuation for Mars and a playfully affectionate tangent for Paak." Pat Carty from Hot Press stated that the album "will make your year immeasurably better. Sexy, groovy, funny, funky, and the Soul/R&B album of the year." Wongo Okon of Uproxx called the album "fun, charismatic, and ambitious in all the best ways", adding that it will "undoubtedly be one of 2021's most memorable albums." Jason Lipshutz from Billboard said "the studio product contains its fair share of glittery jams – stick around for the superb finale, "Blast Off" – the nine-song LP will undoubtedly be best suited in a live setting, if Mars and .Paak decide to tour."

HipHopDX's Kyle Eustice gave it a 3.8 out of 5 rating. Eustice felt "Mars and Paak are in and out, delivering their best impression of '70s funk, soul and R&B – albeit each track is so spit polished and clean, it noticeably lacks the raw charm of the original. But that in no way means An Evening With Silk Sonic doesn't have its merits." Candace McDuffie from Paste, in reviewing An Evening with Silk Sonic, believed it "works because these two artists know how to complement each other extraordinarily well. Hopefully, down the line, they will work to reinvent the wheel instead of merely paying homage to it. But in the meantime, the world should just enjoy the pithy musings of this lively pair." She gave it a 7.4 out of 10. AllMusic's Andy Kellman gave the album three-and-a-half stars out of five. Kellman praised "The duo's playfulness. The trade-off is that they push each other into new levels of showmanship without pandering to the audience. Besides, there's some genuinely witty stuff here." Pitchfork's Ross Scarano rated it 6.4 out of 10, and found "Leave the Door Open" and "After the Last Night" to be the most outstanding songs of the album, due to "slathering elevated technique—all those key changes."

In a mixed review, No Ripcord writer Joe Rivers rated the album 6 out of 10 and wrote An Evening with Silk Sonic suffers from "a paucity of ideas" with tracks that recycle the same sounds and subject matter. Rivers added, "It's not cynical and calculated enough to be a shameless cash-grab yet it's not self-indulgent enough to be a vanity project...an intended homage." In a negative review, Chris Richards from The Washington Post said "Silk Sonic is too nice to be nasty and too famous to be useful. As a wedding band, they would absolutely kill." Richards heavily criticized "Fly as Me" and "Skate".

=== Year-end lists ===
Several publications put An Evening with Silk Sonic on their lists of best albums of 2021, including top-ten placements from Billboard and the Pittsburgh Post-Gazette. BET also included the album on their list of "The 50 Biggest Music Moments of 2021". The staff affirmed that "An evening with Silk Sonic has lived up to its billing in 2021 as a sexy, rich, and authentic experience – one to take with you into the new year." The following is a selected list of publications.

Select year-end rankings of An Evening with Silk Sonic
Publication	List	Rank	Ref.
Billboard	Best R&B Albums of 2021	6	
Billboard	The Best Albums of 2021	7	
Complex	The Best Albums of 2021	14	
Gigwise	The 51 Best Albums of 2021	16	
NME	The 50 best albums of 2021	22	
Pittsburgh Post-Gazette	The 10 best albums of 2021	8	
Rolling Stone	50 Best Albums of 2021	35	
Spin	The 30 Best Albums of 2021	30	

=== Accolades ===
In 2022, An Evening with Silk Sonic was nominated for Outstanding Album at the 53rd NAACP Image Awards. It won R&B Album of the Year at the 2022 iHeartRadio Music Awards and was named Modern Pop-Rock Album/Voice Recording of the Year at the 2022 Fonogram Awards. The album was nominated for Top R&B Album at the 2022 Billboard Music Awards. An Evening with Silk Sonic was awarded Album of the Year at the BET Awards 2022. The album was nominated for Favorite R&B Album at the American Music Awards of 2022. It was also nominated Album of the Year at the 2022 Soul Train Music Awards. In the same year, "Leave the Door Open" won four Grammy Awards at the 64th Annual Grammy Awards: Record of the Year, Song of the Year, Best R&B Performance (tied with "Pick Up Your Feelings" (2020) by Jazmine Sullivan), and Best R&B song. However, Mars and .Paak declined to submit An Evening with Silk Sonic for the 65th Annual Grammy Awards, citing the number of accolades they had already garnered. The album had been assumed to be a top contender for Album of the Year.

== Commercial performance ==
An Evening with Silk Sonic debuted at number two on the Billboard 200 with first-week sales of 104,000 equivalent album units, which represents 42,000 in traditional album sales, 60,000 streaming units calculated from the 82.6 million on-demand streams of the album's tracks, and 2,000 in track equivalent album units. It became Mars's fourth and .Paak's second top-ten record in the United States. It was also the latter's highest-charting album on the Billboard 200. The next week, it sold 50,000 units, dropping to number four. An Evening with Silk Sonic remained in the US top-ten for a third consecutive week, despite a fall in sales to 37,000 units. It was Mars's second and .Paak's first record to enter the Top R&B/Hip-Hop Albums, debuting at number one. All tracks appeared on Hot R&B/Hip-Hop Songs.

As of December 29, 2021, An Evening with Silk Sonic had surpassed a billion streams on Spotify. The album rose from number 111 to number 30 on the Billboard 200, following Silk Sonic's four wins—with presentation of Record of the Year and Song of the Year both being televised—and show-opening performance of "777" at the 2022 Grammy Awards. An Evening with Silk Sonic was the country's eleventh-highest-selling and overall 37th-most-consumed album of the year. All the singles but "Skate" topped the Billboard Adult R&B Songs, which led to the album becoming only the second with four number-one singles on the chart, tying with Toni Braxton's self-titled (1993) studio album. An Evening with Silk Sonic has been certified platinum by the Recording Industry Association of America (RIAA).

On August 26, 2022, An Evening With Silk Sonic was released on vinyl, nine months after its initial release. In its first week the album re-entered the top 10 in the US, ascending from number 200 to number seven. It sold 44,000 equivalent album units after its vinyl release, the second-largest sales week since its release. Of that total, 38,000 were album sales, with almost 37,000 vinyl sales. The vinyl sales led to its debut at the top spot on the Vinyl Albums chart. It also became the biggest sales week for an R&B album on vinyl, a record previously held by The Weeknd's Dawn FM (2022) with 34,000 copies.

The album was less successful in Europe. Despite only debuting at number nine on the UK Albums Chart, it was able to top the UK R&B Albums chart. The record has sold 100,000 equivalent album units in the UK, and earned a gold certification from the British Phonographic Industry (BPI). In France, An Evening with Silk Sonic debuted at number 12 and spent 28 weeks on the chart. Two years and three months after its release, equivalent album units exceeded 50,000, and it was certified gold by the Syndicat National de l'Édition Phonographique (SNEP). It debuted and peaked at number three in the Netherlands, spending 51 weeks on the chart. It was certified gold by NVPI. In Denmark, An Evening with Silk Sonic debuted and peaked at number five. It was certified gold by IFPI Danmark. Elsewhere in Europe, the record entered the top five on charts in Ireland and Switzerland. It also peaked at number four in the Flanders region of Belgian and Norway.

In Canada, An Evening with Silk Sonic debuted and peaked at number three. It became Mars's fourth album to reach the top three and .Paak's highest-charting record so far. It spent 18 weeks on the Canadian Albums Chart and was certified platinum by Music Canada (MC). In New Zealand, the record peaked at number three upon its debut and spent 18 weeks on the chart. It was certified double platinum by Recorded Music NZ (RMNZ). It entered at number four in Australia. Despite the album never charting in Brazil, it was certified platinum by Pro-Música Brasil (PMB).

== Track listing ==
All tracks are produced by Bruno Mars and D'Mile, except where listed.

An Evening with Silk Sonic standard edition
No.	Title	Writer(s)	Producer(s)	Length
1.	"Silk Sonic Intro"	Mars; Brandon Anderson; Dernst Emile II		1:03
2.	"Leave the Door Open"	Mars; B. Anderson; Emile; Christopher Brody Brown		4:02
3.	"Fly as Me"	Mars; B. Anderson; Emile; James Fauntleroy; Sean Anderson		3:39
4.	"After Last Night" (with Thundercat and Bootsy Collins)	Mars; B. Anderson; Emile; Fauntleroy; Stephen Bruner; Jonathan Yip; Ray Romulus; Jeremy Reeves; Ray Charles McCollough II	Mars; D'Mile; the Stereotypes	4:09
5.	"Smokin out the Window"	Mars; B. Anderson; Emile		3:17
6.	"Put On a Smile"	Mars; B. Anderson; Kenneth "Babyface" Edmonds; Emile		4:16
7.	"777"	Mars; B. Anderson; Brown; Emile	Mars	2:45
8.	"Skate"	Mars; B. Anderson; Emile; Fauntleroy; Domitille Degalle; J.D. Beck		3:23
9.	"Blast Off"	Mars; B. Anderson; Emile		4:45
Total length:				31:19

Bonus track (digital & vinyl)
No.	Title	Writer(s)	Length
9.	"Love's Train"	Felton C. Pilate; Michael V. Cooper	5:07
Total length:			36:26

Notes

- On the alternative version of the album, "Love's Train" is the ninth track of the album while "Blast Off" is placed as the tenth song.

== Personnel ==
Credits adapted from album's liner notes.

Silk Sonic

- Bruno Mars – vocals (all tracks), guitar (tracks 1–2, 5–9), congas (2, 8), percussion (3, 5–9), guitar solo (4, 9), sitar (5, 8)
- Anderson .Paak – vocals (all tracks), drums (1–4, 6–9)

Additional musicians

- Babyface – background vocals (6)
- Brody Brown – bass (2, 7)
- Natasha Colkett – violin (2, 4–6, 8, 9)
- Bootsy Collins – vocals (1, 4–6, 9)
- Gared Crawford – violin (2, 6, 8)
- D'Mile – background vocals (1, 3, 6–9), bass (1, 3, 5, 6, 8, 9), piano (1, 2, 4–6, 8), guitar (1, 4), keyboards (1, 9), B3 (3, 7), percussion (3, 6), organ (1), Rhodes (4, 8), programming (9)
- Blake Espy – violin (2, 4–6, 8, 9)
- Ella Feingold – additional guitars (1, 4), guitar effects (2), vibraphone (5)
- Glenn Fischbach – cello (2, 4–6, 8, 9)
- David Foreman – rhythm guitar (8)
- Marc Franklin – trumpet (1, 3, 5–7)
- Larry Gold – string arrangements and conducting (2, 4–6, 8, 9)
- Steve Heitliner – viola (6, 8)
- Chris Jussell – violin (4, 5, 9)
- Ron Kerber – flute (4)
- Jonathan Kim – viola (2, 4–6, 8, 9)
- James King – vocals (1)
- Emma Kummrow – violin (2, 4–6, 8, 9)
- Luigi Mazzocchi – violin (2, 4–6, 8, 9)
- Lannie McMillan – tenor saxophone (3, 5–7)
- Krystal Miles – background vocals (3, 4, 9)
- Boo Mitchell – horns (1, 3, 5–7)
- Yoshihiko Nakano – viola (2, 4, 5, 9)
- Jeremy Reeves – percussion (4)
- Kirk Smothers – alto saxophone (1, 3, 5–7), baritone saxophone (3, 5, 7)
- Homer Steinweiss – drums (5)
- Steve Tirpak – string co-arrangements (6)
- Thundercat – vocals, bass (4)
- Tess Varley – violin (2, 4–6, 8, 9)
- Kameron Whalum – trombone (1, 3, 5–7), vocals (1)

Technical

- Randy Merrill – mastering
- Serban Ghenea – mixing
- John Hanes – mix engineering
- Charles Moniz – engineering, recording, percussion (4)
- Alex Resoagli – engineering assistance, cabasa (4)
- Bryce Bordone – mixing assistance, mix engineering
- Jeff Chestek – strings recording (4–6, 8, 9)
- Cody Cichowski – strings recording (2), strings recording assistance (6, 8)
- Tobe Donohue – Bootsy Collins vocal recording (1, 4–6)
- Jens Jungkurth – drum engineering (5)

Artwork and design

- Florent Déchard – album art, photography
- John Esparza – album art, photography
- HarperCollins – photography

== Charts ==
=== Weekly charts ===
List of chart positions
Chart (2021–2022)	Peak position
Australian Albums (ARIA)	4
Austrian Albums (Ö3 Austria)	12
Belgian Albums (Ultratop Flanders)	4
Belgian Albums (Ultratop Wallonia)	15
Canadian Albums (Billboard)	3
Czech Albums (ČNS IFPI)	68
Danish Albums (Hitlisten)	5
Dutch Albums (Album Top 100)	3
Finnish Albums (Suomen virallinen lista)	7
French Albums (SNEP)	12
German Albums (Offizielle Top 100)	14
Hungarian Albums (MAHASZ)	9
Irish Albums (Official Charts)	5
Italian Albums (FIMI)	18
Japanese Albums (Oricon)	10
Japanese Hot Albums (Billboard Japan)	5
Lithuanian Albums (AGATA)	13
New Zealand Albums (RMNZ)	3
Norwegian Albums (VG-lista)	4
Polish Albums (ZPAV)	45
Portuguese Albums (AFP)	3
Scottish Albums (Official Charts)	8
Slovak Albums (IFPI)	100
Spanish Albums (Promusicae)	11
Swedish Albums (Sverigetopplistan)	7
Swiss Albums (Schweizer Hitparade)	5
UK Albums (Official Charts)	9
UK R&B Albums (Official Charts)	1
US Billboard 200	2
US Top R&B/Hip-Hop Albums (Billboard)	1

=== Year-end charts ===
List of chart positions
Chart (2021)	Position
Dutch Albums (Album Top 100)	61
Hungarian Albums (MAHASZ)	100

List of chart positions
Chart (2022)	Position
Belgian Albums (Ultratop Flanders)	86
Dutch Albums (Album Top 100)	31
French Albums (SNEP)	196
Japanese Download Albums (Billboard Japan)	27
US Billboard 200	37
US Top R&B/Hip-Hop Albums (Billboard)	29

== Certifications ==
List of Certifications
Region	Certification	Certified units/sales
Brazil (Pro-Música Brasil)	Platinum	40,000^{‡}
Canada (Music Canada)	Platinum	80,000^{‡}
Denmark (IFPI Danmark)	Platinum	20,000^{‡}
France (SNEP)	Gold	50,000^{‡}
Italy (FIMI)	Gold	25,000^{‡}
Netherlands (NVPI)	Gold	20,000^{‡}
New Zealand (RMNZ)	2× Platinum	30,000^{‡}
United Kingdom (BPI)	Gold	100,000^{‡}
United States (RIAA)	Platinum	1,000,000^{‡}
^{‡} Sales+streaming figures based on certification alone.

== Release history ==
Release dates and formats
Region	Date	Label(s)	Format(s)	Edition	Ref.
Various	November 12, 2021	Aftermath; Atlantic	Cassette; CD; digital download; streaming	Standard	
Various	November 12, 2021	Aftermath; Atlantic	CD	Silk Sonic Box Set: Gold T-shirt	
Various	November 12, 2021	Aftermath; Atlantic	CD	Silk Sonic Box Set: Cream T-shirt	
Various	August 26, 2022	Aftermath; Atlantic	Vinyl	Standard	
Various	August 26, 2022	Aftermath; Atlantic	Vinyl	Webstore Exclusive	
United States	August 26, 2022	Aftermath; Atlantic	Vinyl	Target Exclusive	
United States	August 26, 2022	Aftermath; Atlantic	Vinyl	Walmart Exclusive	

== See also ==
- List of Billboard number-one R&B/hip-hop albums of 2021
- List of UK R&B Albums Chart number ones of 2021
