= An Evening with Silk Sonic at Park MGM =

2022 concert residency in Las Vegas, Nevada

- Residency by Silk Sonic
- Promotional poster for the first leg of shows
- Location: Paradise, Nevada, U.S.
- Venue: Dolby Live at Park MGM
- Associated album: An Evening with Silk Sonic
- Start date: February 25, 2022
- End date: August 19, 2022
- Legs: 3
- No. of shows: 34
- Attendance: 170,000
- Box office: $50.4 million
Bruno Mars tour chronology
24K Magic World Tour (2017–18)	An Evening with Silk Sonic at Park MGM (2022)	Bruno Mars Live (2022–24)
Anderson .Paak tour chronology
The Best Teef In the Game Tour (2020)	An Evening with Silk Sonic at Park MGM (2022)	Why Lawd? Tour (with Knxwledge, as NxWorries) (2025)

An Evening with Silk Sonic at Park MGM was a concert residency by Silk Sonic, an American R&B superduo composed of musicians Bruno Mars and Anderson .Paak, to support their debut studio album An Evening with Silk Sonic (2021). It was held at Dolby Live, a venue at the Park MGM casino hotel on the Las Vegas Strip in Paradise, Nevada. The setlist featured all songs from Silk Sonic's album; other inclusions were solo material from each member's discographies and various covers.

Shows typically ended with Silk Sonic performing an encore of "Leave the Door Open" (2021). The residency received a positive reception from music critics, who praised Silk Sonic's energy and showmanship. The concert residency was promoted by Live Nation and MGM Resorts, ran from February to August 2022, and grossed $50.4 million. At the 2023 iHeartRadio Music Awards, the concert residency was nominated for Favorite Residency but lost to Harry Styles's Love On Tour (2021–23).

== Background and development ==
On January 19, 2022, Silk Sonic, American superduo composed of musicians Bruno Mars and Anderson .Paak, announced they would be performing 13 shows at Dolby Live in Paradise, Nevada, at the casino hotel Park MGM in support of their debut studio album, An Evening with Silk Sonic (2021). Pre-sales were made available on the same day, while general sales started on January 21. The shows were subject to the venue's COVID-19 protocol, which required masks and proof of full vaccination, a negative COVID test, or a rapid on-site test. Regarding the shows, Mars said, "Its happening! The sexiest party of the year! Them Silk Sonic Boyz are performing Live in Las Vegas! [sic]" .Paak added: "The terms are locked and Vegas might not ever be the same Jack!! You're invited to the hottest show in sin city!" In Vegas, various billboards advertised the show as "The Sexiest Party of the Year." Live Nation and MGM Resorts were the residency's promoters.

Silk Sonic's first leg of shows started on February 25 and ended April 2. 12 additional May dates were added following the announcement of the initial shows. The residency was further extended in May with the announcement of nine final August performances. The concert had a no cell phone policy; attendees' were required to lock their devices in Yondr pouches before entry and were only returned them when leaving the venue.

Sonic's after-parties took place at a nightclub, On the Record, at Park MGM. These were held by DJ Peter Shalvoy, and sometimes Mars and .Paak attended. Shalvoy described the parties as a "great vibe; everyone is having fun, and then Anderson comes in and brings the energy and that big smile to the room". The parties were sponsored by a spirit co-owned by Mars, SelvaRey Rum, which opened "the SelvaRey After Party Lounge" next to the Juniper Cocktail Lounge nearby Park MGM. After their show on March 23, Silk Sonic, along with Usher and Jermaine Dupri, celebrated at the restaurant Delilah at the Wynn Las Vegas, where Usher and .Paak performed.

== Rehearsals ==
Mars rented two rehearsal studios in Burbank, California, to prepare for Silk Sonic's residency. One studio was used for rehearsals, while the other was dedicated to wardrobe preparation. Mikael Wood for The Los Angeles Times, in his visit, wrote that the wardrobe included "patterned shirts", "fedoras and bedazzled eyewear", as well as "Gucci loafers, Florsheim boots, Vans slip-ons the color of banana Laffy Taffy". Silk Sonic themselves finalized production elements such as coordinated suits, a horn section, and choreographed performances.

Mars said the shows taking place in Las Vegas reminded him of his childhood, when he would perform for people from different countries with his family band in Honolulu, Hawaii. Las Vegas being "a melting pot", according to Mars, made it a similar experience. He also explained the reason behind locking the audience's phones in pouches during the concert was so that the fans could enjoy the experience they created and make them a part of it. It would also allow the duo to try different dance moves or jokes, with no camera recording it, and later face potential social backlash because of it. . Paak recalled that mastering Mars's choreography proved challenging during rehearsals.

== Production ==
Park MGM is equipped with an L-Acoustics K2 sound system and Dolby Atmos capabilities. For the residency, front-of-house engineer Chris Rabold opted to present the performances in conventional left-right stereo in order to preserve the vintage R&B character of the music. He used an SSL L650 mixing console, which allowed him to adapt pre-existing show configurations for Silk Sonic's residency and related performances with minimal changes to routing and setup.

A key focus of the drum sound was achieving a deliberately "dry 1970s" aesthetic. To that end, two contrasting drum mic setups were used: Eric Hernandez's kit was captured with stereo overheads, while .Paak's kit was recorded with a more minimal, mono overhead approach supplemented by additional close and ambient microphones. This contrast contributed to a more raw, breakbeat-influenced texture, particularly in .Paak's drum parts, which were processed to emphasise a "breakbeat and hip-hop crusty sound".

Monitor engineer Ramon Morales managed multiple in-ear mixes for the band and technical staff. Instead of traditional stage wedges, the production used flown sidefills primarily for ambient reinforcement and backup. Morales noted that working in a residency environment allowed the team to tailor the mix to a consistent acoustic space, reducing the need to compensate for changing venue acoustics compared with a touring setup.

== Concert synopsis ==
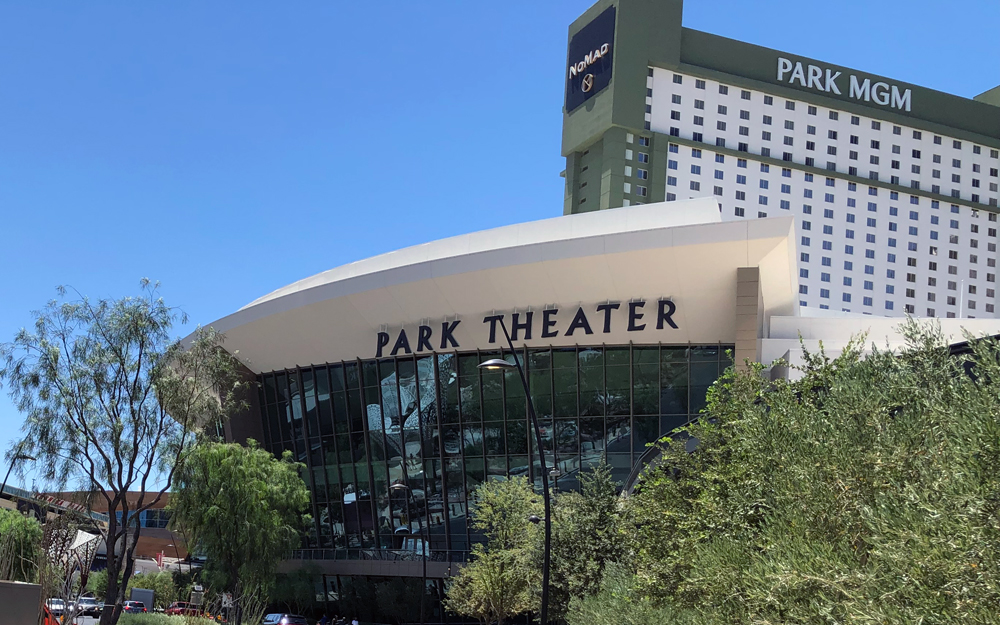
Dolby Live, pictured in 2019. The venue was known as the Park Theater until 2021.

The concert, which had a runtime of 90 to 120 minutes, was used to perform the entire An Evening with Silk Sonic album. It opened with fog emerging from beneath a red velvet curtain, while the venue darkened to signal the start of the show. A disco ball hovered over the audience, and two screens on opposite sides of the stage displayed images of the duo in a tropical setting wearing floral button-up shirts. As the curtain lifted, the stage was illuminated by sunset-orange lighting and visuals of multicoloured stars, rainbow streaks, and a neon shell-themed backdrop. At this point, Mars and .Paak performed a bongo and drum face-off, followed by a transition in which a piano was played and the audience began dancing. The backing band appeared in coordinated silk outfits, while Mars and .Paak wore velvet jackets; .Paak also wore a mushroom-style wig and cream silk blouse. The band performed instrumental interludes, with the horn section integrated into choreographed movement.

A giant screen descended from the roof displaying an animated spaceship while Bootsy Collins's "Silk Sonic Intro" played. Mars then appeared playing a teal guitar before shouting, "Let's go!", to which .Paak responded, "You didn't even let us work out the kinks yet." The show opened with "777", which transitioned seamlessly into "Skate". During the latter, the duo danced alongside two backup singers before thanking the audience for attending. In reference to the concert's no-phone policy, Silk Sonic jokingly told the audience, "What happens in Las Vegas should stay in Las Vegas", before singing "We took your phone away!" in an uptempo R&B melody. The segment reflected the duo's playful stage banter, with .Paak adding, "Some of them look mad." According to Mya Abraham for Vibe, his unscripted remarks throughout the performance keept the audience engaged.

During their performance of "Love's Train", Mars interpolated Earth, Wind, & Fire's "Can't Hide Love" while performing choreographed routines. The duo also performed solo segments of each other's material, including Mars's "That's What I Like", reworked with Earth, Wind & Fire–influenced arrangements, individual spotlights, and a slowed-down, more intimate stage presentation. .Paak's "Am I Wrong", originally from Malibu (2016), was performed in a slower arrangement accompanied by yellow fireworks effects. This was followed by a trumpet performance of "Everybody Loves the Sunshine" by Maurice "Mobetta" Brown. The segment functioned as an interlude between Mars's "Treasure", during which .Paak sang the bridge, and "Fly as Me", which featured extensive ad-libbing and vocal improvisation. During "Fly as Me", .Paak encouraged audience participation, asking fans to "throw their hands up and let loose", while moving across the stage and engaging in informal banter with the crowd.

The duo then changed into black jackets to perform an extended version of "Smokin Out the Window", which featured vocal improvisation. This was followed by a medley of "Put On a Smile", "Make It Better", and "When I Was Your Man", with portions of "Put On a Smile" performed a cappella. On some nights, the medley instead included The Dramatics' "In the Rain" and concluded with an acoustic rendition of "When I Was Your Man", accompanied by a thunderstorm backdrop above a park bench. "After Last Night" featured Mars performing a guitar solo under a blue spotlight. During the latter part of the show, .Paak played the drums on Mars's "Runaway Baby", while Mars took over the drums for .Paak's "Come Down"; the former also included a dance break by Mars. The spaceship visuals returned for "Blast Off", which included a cappella passages before the stage lights faded at the end of the performance. The curtain then rose for an encore performance of the closing song, "Leave the Door Open". The concert concluded with confetti cannons firing as the curtain closed.

== Reception and other shows ==
The concert residency was met with positive reviews from critics. Melinda Sheckells from Billboard commented that "it felt impossible that Mars and .Paak had never done a show of this magnitude before as a duo". Melissa Gill of Consequence wrote the show "is an electric dance party that's not to be missed". She added that it "might just be the sexiest dance party Sin City has ever seen." Rolling Stone's Mark Gray called the concert a "soulful, energetic vibe blending disco, funk, R&B, and rock". Gray also praised it by saying, "From the fashion to the footwork, the show was a masterclass in Seventies nostalgia." Matt Kelemen from Las Vegas Magazine stated Silk Sonic "created the ultimate retro-soul dance party that must be attended in person". Taylor Weatherby, writing for the Grammy Awards, declared that Silk Sonic "crafted a night to remember", and their "harmonies were even more unbelievable live than on record". Brock Radke from Las Vegas Weekly dubbed the show "enthralling and celebratory". Radke added the duo "isn't transporting the audience to another era so much as pulling that era's amazing music into the present day". John Katsilometes from the Las Vegas Review-Journal praised the stage, calling it "staggering". Katsilometes concluded the show "is like time travel to a period when it was fine to suit, up, show up and get your groove on". During a show in May, Katsilometes commented that the concert "is transformed into a giant Soul Train experience". Mya Abraham of Vibe also found the concert to be a Soul Train experience, but the "lighting elevated the show", and the duo studied "incomparable performers of the past". Abraham furthered that the concert "was a well-sequenced, true mastery in visual storytelling".

The set was nominated for Favorite Residency at the 2023 iHeartRadio Music Awards but lost to Harry Styles's Love On Tour (2021–23). As of May 2025, the residency's Las Vegas shows ranked among the "25 Biggest Concert Residencies of All Time", according to Billboard at number 20. It grossed $50.4 million from a total of 170,000 tickets sold in 34 shows.

Silk Sonic, after playing their set on August 14, 2022, also performed a surprise concert at The Barbershop Cuts & Cocktails, a prohibition-style speakeasy and functioning barbershop, at the Cosmopolitan of Las Vegas, operated by MGM Resorts International. The duo joined the house band, the 442's, and their set lasted for 15 minutes. They were wearing their signature costumes, while .Paak had a blonde wig. They performed covers of Papa Roach's "Last Resort", the Outfield's "Your Love", and the Police's "Roxanne". Their band also played aside a DJ playlist, which featured Clipse and Ja Rule. Allie Gregory from Exclaim! commented, "The Papa Roach cover is pretty faithful — down to the early-aughts-style nasally vocals, which were mainly delivered by .Paak." American Songwriter' Alex Hopper and Tom Breihan for Stereogum shared similar views, saying the duo transformed "Last Resort" from a despair track with lyrics regarding suicide, to "another party song".

== Setlist ==
The set list given below was performed on February 25, 2022.

1. "Silk Sonic Intro"
2. "777"
3. "Skate"
4. "Love's Train" (cover)
5. "That's What I Like"
6. "Am I Wrong"
7. "Treasure"
8. "Everybody Loves the Sunshine" (cover)
9. "Fly as Me"

10. "Smokin out the Window"
11. "Put on a Smile" / "Make It Better" / "When I Was Your Man"
12. "After Last Night"
13. "Come Down"
14. "Runaway Baby"
15. "Pure Imagination" (cover)
16. "Blast Off"

Encore

17. "Leave the Door Open"

== Shows ==
List of concerts, showing date, city, venue, tickets sold, number of available tickets and amount of gross revenue
Date	City	Venue	Attendance	Revenue
Leg 1
February 25, 2022	Las Vegas	Dolby Live	-	-
February 26, 2022	Las Vegas	Dolby Live	-	-
March 2, 2022	Las Vegas	Dolby Live	-	-
March 4, 2022	Las Vegas	Dolby Live	-	-
March 5, 2022	Las Vegas	Dolby Live	-	-
March 16, 2022	Las Vegas	Dolby Live	-	-
March 18, 2022	Las Vegas	Dolby Live	-	-
March 19, 2022	Las Vegas	Dolby Live	-	-
March 23, 2022	Las Vegas	Dolby Live	-	-
March 25, 2022	Las Vegas	Dolby Live	-	-
March 26, 2022	Las Vegas	Dolby Live	-	-
March 31, 2022	Las Vegas	Dolby Live	-	-
April 2, 2022	Las Vegas	Dolby Live	-	-
Leg 2
May 4, 2022	Las Vegas	Dolby Live	-	-
May 6, 2022	Las Vegas	Dolby Live	-	-
May 7, 2022	Las Vegas	Dolby Live	-	-
May 10, 2022	Las Vegas	Dolby Live	-	-
May 13, 2022	Las Vegas	Dolby Live	-	-
May 14, 2022	Las Vegas	Dolby Live	-	-
May 17, 2022	Las Vegas	Dolby Live	-	-
May 20, 2022	Las Vegas	Dolby Live	-	-
May 21, 2022	Las Vegas	Dolby Live	-	-
May 25, 2022	Las Vegas	Dolby Live	-	-
May 28, 2022	Las Vegas	Dolby Live	-	-
May 29, 2022	Las Vegas	Dolby Live	-	-
Leg 3
August 3, 2022	Las Vegas	Dolby Live	-	-
August 5, 2022	Las Vegas	Dolby Live	-	-
August 6, 2022	Las Vegas	Dolby Live	-	-
August 10, 2022	Las Vegas	Dolby Live	-	-
August 12, 2022	Las Vegas	Dolby Live	-	-
August 13, 2022	Las Vegas	Dolby Live	-	-
August 16, 2022	Las Vegas	Dolby Live	-	-
August 18, 2022	Las Vegas	Dolby Live	-	-
August 19, 2022	Las Vegas	Dolby Live	-	-
Total			170,000	$50,400,000

== Personnel ==
Silk Sonic and The Hooligans

- Bruno Mars – lead vocals, congas, guitar, piano
- Anderson .Paak – lead vocals, drums
- The Hooligans (excluding Philip Lawrence and Phredley Brown) – same instruments
- Kameron Whalum – backup vocals
- James King – backup vocals
- Maurice "Mobetta" Brown – trumpet
- Mateus Asato – lead guitar

Sound and monitor production

- Clair Global – sound company
- Chris Rabold – FOH engineer
- Ramon Morales – monitor engineer
- Julian Gates – systems engineer
- Scotty Megrath – stage patch/monitor technician
- Shannon Fitzpatrick – stage patch/monitor technician
- Paul Tobey – RF technician/crew chief
- Charles Moniz – recording engineer
- Chris "Sully" Sullivan – L-Acoustics support
- Kevin Valind – Dolby Live Theater audio
- Luis Leiva – Dolby Live Theater audio
