= Leave the Door Open =

2021 single by Silk Sonic

Single by Silk Sonic

from the album An Evening with Silk Sonic
- Released: March 5, 2021
- Studio: Shampoo Press & Curl
- Genre: Philadelphia soul; retro-soul; R&B; pop
- Length: 4:02
- Label: Aftermath; Atlantic
- Songwriters: Bruno Mars; Brandon Anderson; Dernst Emile II; Christopher Brody Brown
- Producers: Bruno Mars; D'Mile

Bruno Mars singles chronology
"Blow" (2019)	"Leave the Door Open" (2021)	"Skate" (2021)

Anderson .Paak singles chronology
"Jewelz" (2020)	"Leave the Door Open" (2021)	"Skate" (2021)

Silk Sonic singles chronology
"Leave the Door Open" (2021)	"Skate" (2021)

Alternative cover
- CD single cover of the live version

Music video
- "Leave the Door Open" on YouTube

"Leave the Door Open" is the debut single by the American superduo Silk Sonic, consisting of Bruno Mars and Anderson .Paak, from their studio album An Evening with Silk Sonic (2021). The song was written by the artists alongside Brody Brown and Dernst "D'Mile" Emile II, who produced it with Mars. It was released on March 5, 2021, by Aftermath Entertainment and Atlantic Records for digital download and streaming. A Philadelphia soul, R&B, and pop song, it is influenced by quiet storm. The lyrics are humorous and describe a "detailed erotic invitation".

"Leave the Door Open" received widespread critical acclaim, with many critics praising both singers' vocals, as well as the song's composition. The song was a commercial success as it topped various charts. In the United States, the track reached the top spot of the Billboard Hot 100 and the Hot R&B/Hip-Hop Songs and was certified two times platinum by the Recording Industry Association of America (RIAA). Furthermore, it also peaked at number one in Israel, Malaysia, and New Zealand. The song entered the top ten of several countries such as Australia, Belgium, Canada, and Portugal. It was certified diamond by the Syndicat national de l'édition phonographique (SNEP), five times platinum by Recorded Music New Zealand (RMNZ) and by Music Canada (MC).

The accompanying music video, directed by Florent Dechard and Mars, was released along with the song. It depicts Mars and .Paak, as Silk Sonic, performing the song in a vintage studio as several women dance to it. To promote "Leave the Door Open", Silk Sonic performed it at the 63rd Annual Grammy Awards. The song was praised for its simplicity and the performance was compared to a 70s Soul Train telecast. The duo also performed the song at the BET Awards 2021 and 2021 iHeartRadio Music Awards. The song received several nominations and awards, winning Song of the Year at the 2021 Soul Train Music Awards, as well as Record of the Year, Song of the Year, Best R&B Performance, and Best R&B Song at the 64th Grammy Awards.

== Background and release ==
Bruno Mars and Anderson .Paak met in 2017, while touring together on the European leg of Mars' 24K Magic World Tour (2017–18). The two were in the studio with Nile Rodgers and Guy Lawrence of Disclosure. In late February 2021, Mars and .Paak announced on social media the formation of their new band, Silk Sonic. They revealed the artwork for their debut studio album, An Evening with Silk Sonic (2021), and announced the release of the first single on March 5, 2021.

In an interview with New Zealand radio DJ Zane Lowe for the Apple Music podcast Beats 1, Paak said the song required a lot of "patience and delicate". He added, "A lot of meat went into this song." Mars lamented the lack of live performances due to the COVID-19 pandemic, adding, "While I'm writing songs, that's a part of my whole thing ... I can't wait till people hear this." On August 18, 2021, during an interview with Rolling Stone, Mars confessed that the bridge of the song "almost broke the band up. But it wasn't right, and we all felt it." He added, "Andy played this thing, and he knew where the groove had to go, but for some reason I kept screaming, 'Man it sounds like books falling!' I was like, 'We gotta turn it down'." In an interview with Songwriter Universe, D'Mile explained that Mars had the idea and the song title, and knew the "concept he wanted"." He said they tried "different versions and ideas", removed pieces, and rebuilt the song several times until everyone was satisfied.

On March 5, 2021, "Leave the Door Open" was released by Aftermath Entertainment and Atlantic Records as the album's first single via digital download and streaming services in various countries. "Silk Sonic Intro" was also issued on the same day, featuring the album's special guest Bootsy Collins. "Leave the Door Open" was released to US contemporary hit radio stations on March 9, 2021, by Atlantic Records. On March 8, 2021, Atlantic Records sent the track to various categories of American adult contemporary radio stations. Warner Music Group issued the track for radio airplay in Italy on March 12, 2021. On April 1, 2021, a live recording of the single was released for digital download and streaming, using audio from the 2021 Annual Grammy Awards performance with added narration from Collins. On the same date, two CD singles, the original version and the live version of the song were released in various countries. The artwork of the CD single was designed by Virgilio Tzaj. The live version of the track was also included on Mars's first compilation album, Collaborations (2026).

== Production ==
"Leave the Door Open" was written by Mars, Brandon Anderson, Dernst Emile II, and Christopher Brody Brown. The production was handled by Mars and D' Mile. The former played the guitar and congas, while the latter played the piano. Paak played the drums, with Brown playing the bass. Ella Feingold handled guitar effects, Glenn Fischbach played cello, Jonathan Kim and Yoshihiko Nakano were on the viola, Blake Espy, Emma Kummrow, and Gared Crawford played violin with Natasha Colkett, Tess Varley, and Luigi Mazzocchi. Larry Gold arranged and conducted the strings at Milkboy Studios, with Cody Cichowski recording it. Charles Moniz and engineer assistant Alex Resoagli, engineered and recorded the song at Shampoo Press & Curl Studios. Serban Ghenea mixed "Leave the Door Open" at MixStar Studios in Virginia Beach, with mix engineer John Hanes and mixing assistant Bryce Bordone. It was mastered by Randy Merrill at Sterling Sound, NYC.

== Composition ==
"Leave the Door Open"
A 25-second sample of "Leave the Door Open", where Mars sings a portion of the chorus which features key changes.

Musically, "Leave the Door Open" is a Philadelphia soul, R&B, retro-soul, and pop song. It is influenced by quiet storm. The song has been described as a "smooth slow jam". Its instrumentation includes a "descending guitar glissando", a glockenspiel, strings, and a smooth piano. The song features key changes and while the background vocals have been described as "honeyed", Silk Sonic's were seen as soft. The vocals "are accompanied by retro-sounding drums and spacious...strings"." The "ascendant bridge" was created using various chord changes that merge into each other. "Leave the Door Open" was composed in the key of C major with a tempo of 74 beats per minute.

"Leave the Door Open" starts with .Paak's "raspy" voice and Mars's background ad-libs. The lyrics are an "erotic invitation" from the singer to a woman, encouraging her to come over to his house. Paak sets the scene with "We should be dancin', romancin'/ In the east wing and the west wing of this mansion", and Bruno follows with the chorus, "hopin' that you feel the way I feel". The lyrics are full of humor, with playful references such as "if you're hungry, girl, I got fillets". This was noticed by several reviewers, who commented on the way the witty lyrics reflected the light-hearted relationship between Mars and .Paak.

Charlie Harding from Vulture said "Leave the Door Open" evokes "1970s Philadelphia soul" and despite being a "serious" composition, it is "lighthearted, lyrically." He found the song nostalgic yet contemporary at the same time due to Paak's vocal flow. American singer-songwriter Tayla Parx thought that its modernity stems from the "conversational" lyrics and Paak's "personality" and "silly" way. Harding pointed out that its modern approach can be heard at the end of Paak's first verse, to which Parx responded, "You can hear [the early influences] in his voice, but those cadences are still very contemporary."

Harding commented that Silk Sonic leads the listener on a musical journey as they wait for their lover. It begins with a "non-resolving chord progression" that leaves the listener expectant. Paak is drinking wine and spending time in his mansion, as he waits for his passion. Nevertheless, Mars does not allow Paak's fulfillment, as he shifts the chords, using a new key. The energy and tension reach a new peak as Mars "sets up this big cadence", and while the listener is hoping to reach a "resolution", it enters the "non-resolving chord progression" on the chorus. However, as the latter approaches the end, a C major chord is played, Silk Sonic sing "tell me that you're coming through", and it enters into its "resolution".

Various publications compared the track to Mars's "Versace on the Floor" (2017). Consequence's staff and Mary Siroky also found similarities to his track "That's What I Like" (2017). NME's Anna Rose said "Leave the Door Open" reminded her of "60s and 70s easy listening love songs". Zoe Haylock from Vulture dubbed the single a "bedroom classic" evoking "'70s slow jams". Mikael Wood of the Los Angeles Times and The New York Times's Jon Pareles found the single to be inspired by the Spinners, the Stylistics, and the Manhattans. Variety writer Jem Aswad and Sophie Williams from NME affirmed "Leave the Door Open" resembles songs by the Delfonics, the Chi-Lites, and the O'Jays. MTV News's Patrick Hosken called it a "throwback to the time of Bobby Womack and Curtis Mayfield".

== Critical reception ==
"Leave the Door Open" was met with universal critical acclaim from music critics. Jenessa Williams from The Guardian found its style to be "impeccable", being "on the right side of pastiche". Consequence's Wren Graves was impressed by Mars's "liquid whipe" voice as .Paak "raps and sings through a foggy haze". Pareles praised the song's instrumentation, the key changes, lyrics, and the contrast between the backup and lead vocals. Siroky called it "nothing if not luxurious, velvety goodness"." Variety writer Aswad called the track "a glorious blast of vintage R&B"; he concluded, "the song and the arrangement are pitch-perfect". Roisin O'Connor from The Independent stated .Paak performs "Marvin Gaye-style harmonies". She also commended the composition and some of the lyrics. Williams from NME described the song as "sumptuous", showcasing Mars's "best vocal performance to date". Paste's Candace McDuffie lauded the track, writing that ".Paak's salacious chants are smoothed over by Mars's sultry crooning"."

No Ripcord's Joe Rivers called the track "outstanding ... [the] harmonies recall the best moments of The Stylistics while still leaving room for .Paak's taut drum fills"." Ross Scarano commenting on Pitchfork called "Leave the Door Open" one of the highlights of An Evening with Silk Sonic, due to its "slathering elevated technique—all those key changes—with satisfying molten cheese"." Alex Suskind of Entertainment Weekly said it is a modern "take on the Delfonics — with the style and substance to match"." Hot Press's writer Pat Carty wrote that if the song "managed to assume human form, [it] would doubtless sport a tasteful silk shirt and medallion combo"." Sowing from Sputnikmusic found the track to be "irrefutably romantic". Sowing added that "Mars's earnest delivery of simple gestures...sounds sincere enough to sweep you off your feet"." Entertainment Tonight, Meredith B. Kile‍ & Tionah Lee‍, called "Leave the Door Open" a "perfectly timeless record"."

AllMusic's critic Andy Kellman said the track "best meshes the smooth and tender style of Mars with Paak's nephew-of-Bobby Womack rasp". Josh Glicksman in the Billboard "Five Burning Questions" article said the track is "tailor-made to dance and snap along to as it gets delightfully stuck in your head". Carl Lamarre, on a different segment on Billboard Five Burning Questions, called the vocals "buttery" and "too irresistible to pass up". Lamarre thought Silk Sonic "threaded a polished '70s soundscape". In the same publication, Jason Lipshutz dubbed the single "an ode to stylish yearning that leans in to the throwback charm"."

On the other hand, Marc Hogan of Pitchfork criticized the track for turning "'70s soul into a costume drama, without the drama" and for its "skillfully rendered pastiche". Hogan thought it would be the same as listening to "an expertly curated quiet-storm compilation". He dubbed the single a "shag-carpeted and leisure-suited booty-call slow jam ... never breaks character long enough to acknowledge the present"." Hogan ended by saying the track is not "postmodern", but "the past in hologram form".

== Accolades ==
Entertainment Weekly's Eli Enis and Alex Suskind recalled "pitch-perfect harmonies" of "Leave the Door Open", placing it on the segment "Friday Five" on March 5, 2021. The song was also included on Under the Radar's Songs of the Week on March 5, 2021; Mark Redfern said, "You can imagine many a baby being conceived to the retro-sounding track." Siroky and the Staff from Consequence considered the song the Top Song of the Week on March 6, 2021, saying it "wouldn't feel out of place on Bruno Mars'...2016 24K Magic album — why mess with a great thing, after all?" J'na Jefferson of Uproxx named the song as one of the contenders for "2021 Song Of The Summer". Jefferson dubbed the lyrics as "inviting [and] sensual". Dee Locket from Vulture included the song on her April list of The Best Songs of 2021 (So Far), saying that the song borrows from the Isley Brothers. She added, "Neither is going about musical curiosity the wrong way." Dave Holmes, in Esquire's "Best Songs of 2021 (So Far)" praised "Leave the Door Open", calling it a "flawless tribute to mid-'70s R&B with a key change that will make you stand up and cheer"." The song was considered the best release until June 2021 by Complex; Jessica McKinney wrote "rarely does a new record come along that can bring together all generations, but 'Leave the Door Open' does exactly that. It has a timeless, feel-good quality with the power to unite a room full of people on a dance floor." "Leave the Door Open" was listed as one of "The 50 Best Songs of 2021" by Billboard Staff Picks on June 8, 2021.

The song was included among the best songs of 2021 by several publications. On the Billboard 100 Best Songs of 2021, the single was placed atop the list. Carl Lamarre affirmed Silk Sonic "recreated the lush sounds of '70s soul, but with enough modern finesse to still conquer audiences not even born until decades later"." On the list of the 50 best songs of 2021, Consequence ranked the song at number 10 and Eddie Fu wrote "with the combination of two of the most talented songwriters in modern music...the duo delivered an immediate contender for Song of the Year." Entertainment Weekly's Leah Greenblatt dubbed the song a "groovy Soul Train dream", ranking it number five on the list of The 10 Best Songs of 2021. On Rolling Stone's 50 Best Songs of 2021, the song ranked at number six and Rob Sheffield said it "didn't sound retro because it felt so gloriously right for 2021...it is pure romance, with every drum hook a pheromone rush". Insider included the track in their list of the best songs of 2021, saying that "as soon as the song's first drum kicks in, their sugar high feels impossible to resist". The single was included on Gigwise 20 Best Tracks of 2021. Alex Rigotti wrote "Leave The Door Open" "is a wonderfully enjoyable offering from the duo". "Leave the Door Open" was included among the 38 best songs of 2021, according to Vogue. Editor Virginia Smith affirmed the song "is a love letter to the '70s"." On the list of the 55 Best Songs of 2021 compiled by Cosmopolitan the song ranked 55th. They wrote that "with its smooth R&B vibe...this song will make you wanna have a romantic night". The BBC's best year-end list was compiled from various end-of-year lists published by the most influential music magazines, blogs, newspapers, and broadcasters across the world. "Leave the Door Open" was third on the list.

=== Awards and nominations ===
"Leave the Door Open" received a total of 19 nominations for music awards and ultimately won ten of them. It received a nomination for Song of the Year at the 2021 MTV Video Music Awards and it was nominated by the 2021 MTV Europe Music Awards for Best Collaboration. In the same year, "Leave the Door Open" won Favorite Soul/R&B Song at the 2021 American Music Awards, as well as Song of the Year and The Ashford & Simpson Songwriter's Award at the 2021 Soul Train Music Awards. In 2022, "Leave the Door Open" won Record of the Year, Song of the Year, Best R&B Performance, in a tie with Jazmine Sullivan's "Pick Up Your Feelings" (2020), and Best R&B Song at the 2022 Grammy Awards. The track won R&B Song of the Year, whilst being nominated for Best Lyrics and Song of the Year at the 2022 iHeartRadio Music Awards. "Leave the Door Open" received the accolade for Top 10 Gold International Gold Songs at the RTHK International Pop Poll Awards.

Awards and nominations for "Leave the Door Open"
Award	Category	Result	Ref.
2021 American Music Awards	Favorite Soul/R&B Song	Won	
2021 MTV Europe Music Awards	Best Collaboration	Nominated	
2021 MTV Millennial Awards	Global Hit of the Year	Nominated	
2021 MTV Millennial Awards Brazil	International Collaboration	Nominated	
2021 MTV Video Music Awards	Song of the Year	Nominated	
2021 People's Choice Awards	The Collaboration Song of 2021	Nominated	
2021 Premios MUSA	Canción Internacional Anglo	Nominated	
2021 Soul Train Music Awards	Song of the Year	Won	
2021 Soul Train Music Awards	The Ashford & Simpson Songwriter's Award	Won	
2022 Billboard Music Awards	Top R&B Song	Won	
2022 Grammy Awards	Record of the Year	Won	
2022 Grammy Awards	Song of the Year	Won	
2022 Grammy Awards	Best R&B Performance	Won (Note: Tied with Jazmine Sullivan for "Pick Up Your Feelings" (2020).)	
2022 Grammy Awards	Best R&B Song	Won	
2022 iHeartRadio Music Awards	Song of the Year	Nominated	
2022 iHeartRadio Music Awards	R&B Song of the Year	Won	
2022 iHeartRadio Music Awards	Best Lyrics	Nominated	
2022 Joox Thailand Music Awards	International Song of the Year	Won	
2022 NAACP Image Awards	Outstanding Soul/R&B Song	Nominated	
2022 RTHK International Pop Poll Awards	Top Ten International Gold Songs	Won	

== Commercial performance ==
=== North America ===
"Leave the Door Open" debuted at number four on the US Billboard Hot 100, with 27,000 downloads, 23.5 million streams and 23.5 million radio impressions in the week of March 15, 2021. It was Mars and Paak's highest debut on the Billboard Hot 100 at the time. The single reached number two the following week, behind Cardi B's "Up" (2021). In the week of April 12, 2021, the song topped the Hot 100, with 28,600 copies sold, 21.5 million streams, and 59.1 million radio impressions. It was the most-sold song of the week, across downloads and two CD versions. The track became Paak's first number one song on the Hot 100. It was Mars's fastest song to reach number one. Mars tied with Drake, Katy Perry, and Rihanna for the most number ones on the Billboard Hot 100 since May 1, 2010, with eight. In the week of May 16, 2021, it spent a second non-consecutive week at number one, helped by the placement in the iTunes Store's 69 cents Pop Hits sale. The song was certified two times platinum by the Recording Industry Association of America (RIAA) for pushing two million certified units on August 19, 2021.

In the week of March 29, 2021, "Leave the Door Open" reached the top 10 of the Radio Songs chart in its third week, becoming the fastest song to do so since Justin Bieber's "Yummy" (2020) took only two weeks to achieve this. The single tied with Mars's "24K Magic" (2016) and "Finesse" (2018), featuring Cardi B, for his fastest rise to the top 10. In the week of April 19, 2021, "Leave the Door Open" topped the chart, becoming Mars and Paak's ninth and first number one, respectively. The song reached top spot in its sixth week, matching the previous record held by Ed Sheeran's "Shape of You" (2017). "Leave the Door Open" also peaked at number one on the Billboard Hot R&B/Hip-Hop Songs and Rhythmic charts. The song took four weeks to top the Adult R&B Songs chart, the fastest by any male artist to do so. It spent thirteen weeks on the top spot of the aforementioned chart. The track became Mars's first song to enter the top 10 on the Adult Contemporary chart since "Uptown Funk" (2014).

The song peaked at number nine on the Canadian Hot 100 in the week of March 15, 2021. It was certified six times platinum by Music Canada (MC) on April 14, 2026. Also the top song on the Year-end Hot R&B/Hip-Hop Songs chart, it topped the chart for eight non-consecutive weeks, spending all but one of its 26 charting weeks in the top 10.

=== International ===
"Leave the Door Open" debuted at number one on the New Zealand Singles Chart, spending two weeks at the top spot. It has received five platinum certifications by Recorded Music New Zealand (RMNZ). In Australia, the song debuted at number 13 on the ARIA Singles Chart, and peaked at number 10 in its second week. The song lasted for 21 weeks on the chart. In Malaysia, the track reached the top spot, and in Singapore, peaked at number two. The track peaked at number one in Israel on the week of March 7, 2021.

The song entered several Monitor Latino charts, including Costa Rica, where it peaked at number three. It charted at number eight in Bolivia and Panama. The song also entered the top ten in Chile and top twenty in El Salvador. "Leave the Door Open" entered the top twenty of the Argentina Hot 100 and peaked at number one on Billboard Mexico Airplay. Despite the single only peaking at number 34 at the Top 100 Brasil, it was certified two times diamond by Pro-Música Brasil (PMB).

In Denmark, the single peaked at number 20 on the Danish Hitlisten, after debuting at number 29. In the United Kingdom, the song debuted at its peak of number 20 on the UK Singles Chart on March 12, 2021. The single also debuted at its peak of number 18 on the Irish Singles Chart. The track debuted at number four on the Portuguese Singles Chart and peaked at number three. It received a triple platinum certification by the Associação Fonográfica Portuguesa (AFP). In Belgium, the track peaked at number five on the Ultratop 50 in Flanders and number four on Wallonia. It peaked at number 11 on the Dutch Top 40 chart on its eleventh week and number 13 on the Dutch Single Top 100. The song peaked at number 10 on the Lithuanian charts and debuted at its peak of 16 in the Hungarian Single Top 40. "Leave the Door Open" peaked at number 26 in the French Single Charts and was certified diamond by the Syndicat national de l'édition phonographique (SNEP).

"Leave the Door Open" peaked at number two on the Billboard Global 200, spending 71 weeks on the chart.

== Music video ==
The music video for "Leave the Door Open" premiered alongside the song's release on March 5, 2021, and was directed by Mars and Florent Dechard. The video takes place in a Motown carpet studio "bathed in warm light" and amber shades. It starts with Paak playing the drums, Mars on the piano, and the other band members, some of Mars's band the Hooligans, on the bass, conga drum, electric keyboard, and other percussion instruments as they sit on stools. Silk Sonic and the band wore "sunglasses and vintage printed shirts" as they perform the song, with close-up shots of Mars and Paak. The track is being recorded as several women, who can be seen as fans, dance to it in the music booth. The video features "disco ball lightning" and ends with a fade-out. The music video on YouTube has received over 950 million views as of June 2026.

=== Reception ===
Mary Siroky and the Consequence staff described the music video as "playful". Ali Rasha, writing for USA Today, commented that everyone was "dressed in looks that give off a retro feel". In 2021, the music video received a nomination for Coca-Cola Viewers' Choice and Video of the Year at the BET Awards 2021. Mars and Dechard were also awarded Video Director of the Year for their work on the music video. At the 2021 MTV Video Music Awards, the visuals won Best R&B Video and Best Editing. In late 2021, the music video was nominated for Video of the Year at the American Music Awards of 2021 and won Video of the Year at the 2021 Soul Train Music Awards. In 2022, it was nominated for Outstanding Music Video/Visual Album at the 53rd NAACP Image Awards and for Best Music Video at the 2022 iHeartRadio Music Awards.

== Live performances and other usage ==
=== Grammy Awards performance ===
The initial list of the 63rd Annual Grammy Awards performances, announced on March 7, 2021, did not include Silk Sonic. Paak and Mars had a funny Twitter exchange with Mars, telling the Recording Academy that the two of them were "out of work musicians" who needed "the promotion" and that they would send an audition tape. Silk Sonic were announced as performers on the show after "playfully campaigning" the week before. The Recording Academy interim president/CEO Harvey Mason Jr. confessed their performance was intentionally not announced to create "buzz", while there was also some uncertainty regarding it. The Grammys' executive producer Ben Winston wanted Paak to perform "Lockdown"; however, he decided to ask the duo to perform.

Silk Sonic made their performance debut at the 63rd Annual Grammy Awards on March 14, 2021, adopting a 70s aesthetic accompanied only by two backup singers. The show featured a "retro flare" similar to the Music Video; Mars, Paak and the back up singers wore three-piece "burnt orange leisure" suits with "wide-collared polyester shirts, bell-bottoms" and "bootcut pants". They completed their look with sunglasses, Paak wearing heart-shaped ones. As Paak sang, Mars and the back-up singers danced behind him in a triangle. Mars would then move to the center replacing Paak, who sang along with the back-up singers. In the background, a "constellation" of "twinkle effects and visual star wipes" rotated.

The performance was met with positive reviews. Eric Todiso from People said that Silk Sonic "stole the show at the 2021 Grammy Awards", dubbing the performance "dazzling and dreamy". Entertainment Weekly's staff considered the performance to be one of the most memorable moments of the show, reminiscent of the "glooses '70s style as a Soul Train telecast". Patrick Ryan from USA Today called it a "sizzling retro throwback", with a ranking of eighth on a list of the night's best performances Jon Caramanica of The New York Times dubbed Silk Sonic's performance "pointedly retro, shimmery luxury soul"." Ben Sisario also compared them to the "1970s Soul Train crooners" in The New York Times. Joe Lynch from Billboard, Randall Roberts from the Los Angeles Times, and MTV News's Hosken all regarded the performance as inspired by the 1970s Soul Train. Haylock of Vulture commented that Silk Sonic were "channeling the Motown kings within themselves". In a mixed review, The Washington Post's Hau Chu, despite thinking "the performance sounded sparkling", found their choice to perform strange.

=== iHeartRadio Music Awards performance ===
On May 27, 2021, Silk Sonic performed the song at the 2021 iHeartRadio Music Awards, utilizing a 1970s aesthetic. Silk Sonic was joined by two back-up vocalists, all dressed in "dark azure crushed velvet blazers", "with roses attached to the lapels" and tinted sunglasses as Paak wore a flat cap. It started with Mars playing the piano for a stripped version, Paak singing with Mars and the backup singers as the "crowd...sang it back to them". The music then stopped as Paak "ripped off his glasses and let out a "wooo" to which Mars responded, ""Let's go! Let's go!"" The full instrumental then kicked in, and with minimalist choreography, Silk Sonic invited the audience to sing-along to the chorus. Mars and Paak also gave an "up-closer and more personal" serenade to the women in the front row. At one point, Mars took the hand of one of the women "and placed in on his bare chest."

The performance was met with positive reviews. Zach Seemayer‍, writing for Entertainment Tonight, considered it one of the best performances "from any music awards show in recent memory." Consequence's Nina Corcoran found the performance "mesmerizing". Lynch from Billboard praised the duo's performance as they "worked the crowd exactly like the '70s soul singers that Silk Sonic pays homage to would have"." Vulture's Halle Kiefer thought "the proximity felt thrilling to watch as the pair performed". Jamie Samhan from Entertainment Tonight Canada and Kate Hogan from People found their show "sexy". Derrick Rossignol of Uproxx was surprised, saying Silk Sonic is "a one-trick pony, but what a trick it is".

=== BET Awards performance ===
On June 27, 2021, Silk Sonic performed the single at the BET Awards 2021 for a "select group of fans", who were vaccinated against the COVID-19 virus. The duo started their performance, dressed in matching pastel tuxedos, walking on a "roped-off red carpet". They sang in a club layout, moving "between the bar and VIP booths". At the same time, fans danced and held up signs as Mars and Paak sang to them helped by background vocalists. The latter also served as backup dancers and "played VIP clubgoers and bottle service girls"." At the end of the performance, Paak teased the audience asking, "Do y'all want to hear a new song? Do y'all want to hear a new song off the new album?", and as fans cheered, he pointed out that the song was still in the top 10, adding that they would never stop playing "Leave the Door Open" until that changes. Silk Sonic started to sing "Leave the Door Open" a second time as "the performance cut to a commercial break."

Jennifer Drysdale from Entertainment Tonight thought Mars and Paak brought "the house down" while dubbing the vocals as "flawless". Consequence's Ben Kaye found that their performance "made them worthy of" winning the BET Best Group Award. Victoria Moorwood of Revolt praised Silk Sonic's performance. Carolyn Droke, writing for Uproxx, called it a "silky-smooth rendition". Rolling Stone's Brittany Spanos declared that Silk Sonic transformed the 2021 BET Awards "into a smokey lounge with [their] velvety performance."

=== Other usage ===
A day after Silk Sonic performed "Leave the Door Open" at the 63rd Annual Grammy Awards, James Corden parodied the song on The Late Late Show with James Corden. Titled "Leave the TV On", the parody's lyrics "encouraged" people to keep their "TV set on after Colbert", so Corden could "get some good ratings"." It started with "Stephen Colbert introducing Corden via an analog television set"." The parody then proceeded to show Corden and the band, dressed in 1970s-inspired clothes, as they sang in a "yellow-walled studio" similar to the set of All in the Family (1971–1979). While band leader Reggie Watts sang about "the late night sandwich meat", Corden was in charge of backing vocals and lead vocals as he sang "counter-lines about his omnipresent man Spanx". Corden also told people they can "leave the TV on mute," or watch the skit on YouTube. Billboard's Gil Kaufman considered it a "funny spoof". Darlene Aderoju of People found "the skit ... catchy".

On April 3, 2021, Epic Games announced the release of a new emote for the online video game Fortnite. It features dance moves by Mars played to the chorus of "Leave the Door Open". Mars and .Paak performed the song, as Silk Sonic, as an encore during their concert residency An Evening with Silk Sonic at Park MGM (2022). In 2022, Mars sung "Leave the Door Open" as part of a medley during his Bruno Mars Live (2022-2024) setlist.

== Track listing ==
Digital download and CD single
No.	Title	Length
1.	"Leave the Door Open"	4:02

Digital download and CD single – live version
No.	Title	Length
1.	"Leave the Door Open" (live)	4:20

== Personnel ==
Credits adapted from the liner notes of An Evening with Silk Sonic.

- Bruno Mars – vocals, songwriting, production, guitar, congas
- Anderson .Paak – vocals, songwriting, drums
- D'Mile – songwriting, production, piano
- Christopher Brody Brown – songwriting, bass
- Ella Feingold – guitar effects
- Larry Gold – strings conduction, arrangement
- Emma Kummrow – violin
- Luigi Mazzocchi – violin
- Blake Espy – violin
- Gared Crawford – violin
- Tess Varley – violin
- Natasha Colkett – violin
- Jonathan Kim – viola
- Yoshihiko Nakano – viola
- Glenn Fischbach – cello
- Cody Chicowski – strings recording
- Charles Moniz – recording, engineering
- Alex Resoagli – engineering assistant
- Serban Ghenea – mixing
- John Hanes – mixing engineering
- Bryce Bordone – mixing assistant
- Randy Merrill – mastering

== Charts ==
=== Weekly charts ===
List of chart positions
Chart (2021)	Peak position
Argentina Hot 100 (Billboard)	20
Australia (ARIA)	10
Austria (Ö3 Austria Top 40)	54
Belgium (Ultratop 50 Flanders)	5
Belgium (Ultratop 50 Wallonia)	4
Bolivia (Monitor Latino)	8
Brazil (Top 100 Brasil)	74
Canada Hot 100 (Billboard)	9
Canada AC (Billboard)	11
Canada CHR/Top 40 (Billboard)	9
Canada Hot AC (Billboard)	7
Chile (Monitor Latino)	10
Costa Rica (Monitor Latino)	3
Czech Republic Singles Digital (ČNS IFPI)	44
Denmark (Tracklisten)	30
El Salvador (Monitor Latino)	19
France (SNEP)	26
Germany (GfK)	72
Global 200 (Billboard)	6
Greece (IFPI)	32
Hong Kong (HKRIA)	7
Hungary (Rádiós Top 40)	38
Hungary (Single Top 40)	16
Iceland (Tónlistinn)	18
Ireland (IRMA)	18
Israel International Airplay (Media Forest)	1
Italy (FIMI)	56
Japan Hot 100 (Billboard)	41
Lithuania (AGATA)	10
Malaysia (RIM)	1
Mexico (Billboard Mexican Airplay)	1
Netherlands (Dutch Top 40)	11
Netherlands (Single Top 100)	13
New Zealand (Recorded Music NZ)	1
Norway (VG-lista)	21
Panama (Monitor Latino)	8
Portugal (AFP)	3
Puerto Rico (Monitor Latino)	17
Romania (Airplay 100)	79
Singapore (RIAS)	2
Slovakia Airplay (ČNS IFPI)	38
Slovakia Singles Digital (ČNS IFPI)	27
South Africa (RISA)	5
South Korea (Gaon)	97
Spain (Promusicae)	71
Sweden (Sverigetopplistan)	38
Switzerland (Schweizer Hitparade)	23
UK Singles (Official Charts)	20
US Billboard Hot 100	1
US Adult Contemporary (Billboard)	6
US Adult Pop Airplay (Billboard)	7
US Dance Airplay (Billboard)	32
US Hot R&B/Hip-Hop Songs (Billboard)	1
US Pop Airplay (Billboard)	5
US Rhythmic Airplay (Billboard)	1
US Rolling Stone Top 100	3
Venezuela (Record Report)	33

=== Monthly charts ===
List of chart position
Chart (2021)	Peak position
Paraguay (SGP)	99

=== Year-end charts ===
List of chart positions
Chart (2021)	Position
Australia (ARIA)	40
Belgium (Ultratop Flanders)	29
Belgium (Ultratop Wallonia)	20
Brazil (Top 100 Brasil)	67
Brazil Streaming (Pro-Música Brasil)	134
Canada (Canadian Hot 100)	23
Denmark (Tracklisten)	53
France (SNEP)	91
Global 200 (Billboard)	16
Netherlands (Dutch Top 40)	64
Netherlands (Single Top 100)	56
New Zealand (Recorded Music NZ)	14
Portugal (AFP)	23
South Korea (Gaon)	134
Switzerland (Schweizer Hitparade)	74
UK Singles (OCC)	68
US Billboard Hot 100	7
US Adult Contemporary (Billboard)	10
US Adult Top 40 (Billboard)	26
US Hot R&B/Hip-Hop Songs (Billboard)	1
US Mainstream Top 40 (Billboard)	23
US Rhythmic (Billboard)	6

List of chart positions
Chart (2022)	Position
Global 200 (Billboard)	109
US Adult Contemporary (Billboard)	26

== Certifications ==
List of certifications
Region	Certification	Certified units/sales
Australia (ARIA)	Gold	35,000^{‡}
Brazil (Pro-Música Brasil)	2× Diamond	320,000^{‡}
Canada (Music Canada)	6× Platinum	480,000^{‡}
Denmark (IFPI Danmark)	Platinum	90,000^{‡}
France (SNEP)	Diamond	333,333^{‡}
Italy (FIMI)	Platinum	100,000^{‡}
Netherlands (NVPI)	Gold	40,000^{‡}
New Zealand (RMNZ)	5× Platinum	150,000^{‡}
Poland (ZPAV)	Platinum	50,000^{‡}
Portugal (AFP)	3× Platinum	30,000^{‡}
Spain (Promusicae)	Platinum	60,000^{‡}
United Kingdom (BPI)	Platinum	600,000^{‡}
United States (RIAA)	2× Platinum	2,000,000^{‡}
Streaming
Japan (RIAJ)	Gold	50,000,000^{†}
^{‡} Sales+streaming figures based on certification alone.^{†} Streaming-only figures based on certification alone.

== Release history ==
List of release history, showing region(s), date(s), format(s), version(s) and label(s)
Region	Date	Format(s)	Version	Label(s)	Ref.
Various	March 5, 2021	Digital download; streaming	Original	Aftermath; Atlantic	
United States	March 8, 2021	Adult contemporary radio	Original	Atlantic	
United States	March 8, 2021	Hot adult contemporary radio	Original	Atlantic	
United States	March 8, 2021	Modern adult contemporary radio	Original	Atlantic	
United States	March 9, 2021	Contemporary hit radio	Original	Atlantic	
Italy	March 12, 2021	Radio airplay	Original	Warner	
Various	April 2, 2021	CD single	Original	Aftermath; Atlantic	
Various	April 2, 2021	CD single	Live	Aftermath; Atlantic	
Various	April 2, 2021	Digital download; streaming	Live	Aftermath; Atlantic	
Various	November 15, 2024	7"	Original; live	Atlantic	

== See also ==
- List of Billboard Hot 100 number ones of 2021
- List of Billboard Hot 100 number-one singles of the 2020s
- List of number-one songs of 2021 (Malaysia)
- List of number-one singles from the 2020s (New Zealand)
