= Silk Sonic =

American R&B superduo

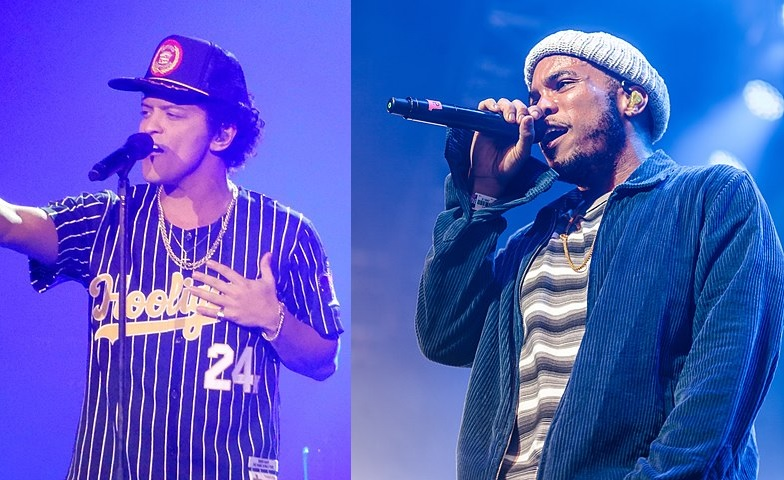
- Bruno Mars and Anderson .Paak

Background information
- Origin: U.S.
- Genres: R&B; soul; funk; pop; hip-hop
- Instruments: Vocals; guitar; piano; drums; congas
- Years active: 2021–present
- Labels: Atlantic; Aftermath
- Members: Bruno Mars; Anderson .Paak
- Website: silksonic.com
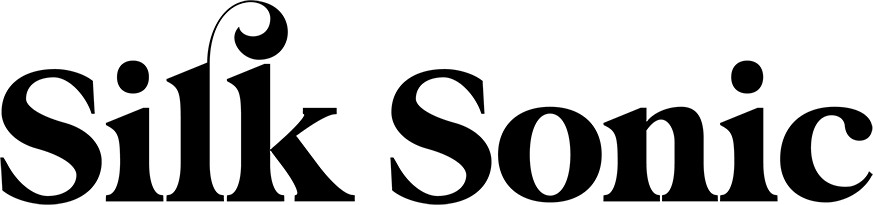

Silk Sonic is an American musical superduo composed of musicians Bruno Mars and Anderson .Paak. Maintaining a good relationship during Mars's 24K Magic World Tour (2017–2018), Mars invited .Paak to record with him. The duo began work on An Evening with Silk Sonic (2021), which debuted at number two on the US Billboard 200 and was praised by music critics.

An Evening with Silk Sonic spawned the singles "Leave the Door Open" (which topped the US Billboard Hot 100 and New Zealand charts), "Smokin out the Window" (which was successful), "Skate" (which charted) and "Love's Train" and "After Last Night", which had some commercial success. "Leave the Door Open" spent 18 weeks in the top ten and two non-consecutive weeks at number one. All the singles except "Skate" topped the Billboard Adult R&B Songs chart, and the album was the second with four number-one singles on that chart.

Silk Sonic received several nominations, including the BET Award for Best Group in 2021 and 2022 and the Brit Award for International Group in 2022. "Leave the Door Open" received several nominations and four Grammy Awards, including Record of the Year and Song of the Year. "Smokin out the Window" was Video of the Year at the BET Awards 2022 and Soul Train Music Awards. "Love's Train" was Outstanding Duo, Group or Collaboration (Traditional) at the NAACP Image Awards. An Evening with Silk Sonic received several nominations and was R&B Album of the Year at the iHeartRadio Music Awards and Album of the Year at the BET Awards. Silk Sonic began a concert residency, An Evening with Silk Sonic at Park MGM (2022), to promote the album.

== History ==
=== 2017–2021: Beginnings ===
Bruno Mars and Anderson .Paak met in 2017 while touring on the European leg of Mars's 24K Magic World Tour (2017–2018), and quickly became friends. They were seen at Abbey Road Studios in London with Nile Rodgers and Guy Lawrence of Disclosure for Chic's album, It's About Time (2018). The duo co-wrote .Paak's "Anywhere" (featuring Snoop Dogg and The Last Artful, Dodgr), which appeared on .Paak's album Oxnard (2018). Two months before the release of An Evening with Silk Sonic, "Fire In The Sky" (written by the duo) was released on Shang-Chi and the Legend of the Ten Rings: The Album (2021).

In early 2017, after .Paak and Mars met, they decided to get together in the studio and try to turn "backstage in-jokes" into songs. The first thing they wrote together began with one of them saying the phrase "smoking out the window". They imagined a "stressed-out" man, smoking too many cigarettes as he tried to find his way out of "anxious" situations. The "joke" became a hook, but when the tour ended the sessions were put on hold.

In February 2020, before the COVID-19 pandemic, Mars was listening to their recordings; they "hit the right chord", so he asked .Paak to join him in the studio. Mars said, "Yo, I want to finish that song" and .Paak replied, "I'm drunk! What do you mean? Come on!". An inebriated .Paak met Mars at the studio. When they began to write the song, a friendly competition emerged as they tried to improve it. When they finished the song .Paak said, "I'm out, what we doing tomorrow?" According to Mars, "Smoking out the Window" was the first song he and .Paak wrote together. Mars reunited with frequent collaborators Brody Brown and Charles Moniz to record An Evening with Silk Sonic.

Mars found American record producer and songwriter D'Mile on Instagram and heard his composition on Lucky Daye's debut studio album, Painted (2019). He asked American singer-songwriter James Fauntleroy to get in touch with D'Mile. D'Mile became one of the album's core composers. According to him, Silk Sonic became a project after he, Mars, and .Paak worked on "Smoking out the Window".

=== 2021–2022: Breakthrough and An Evening with Silk Sonic ===
On February 26, 2021, Mars and .Paak announced that they had recorded an album as Silk Sonic. The album, An Evening with Silk Sonic, featured American musician Bootsy Collins as guest host. The album's artwork was revealed, and its first single was released the following week. Bootsy Collins named the band after hearing the album.

On March 5, 2021, "Leave the Door Open" (the album's first single) was released by Aftermath Entertainment and Atlantic Records. "Silk Sonic Intro" was also released the same day, featuring guest host Bootsy Collins. The single topped the US Billboard Hot 100, Hot R&B/Hip-Hop Songs and New Zealand charts. Silk Sonic made their performance debut with "Leave the Door Open" at the 63rd Annual Grammy Awards on March 14, 2021, with a 1970s aesthetic. They also performed a tribute to Little Richard of "Long Tall Sally" and "Good Golly, Miss Molly".

After performing "Leave the Door Open" at the BET Awards 2021, they introduced a new song. On July 28, 2021, .Paak posted a picture of a red car with the phrase "You've Been Invited To Silk Sonic's Summertime Jam This Friday" on Twitter, hinting at an upcoming release. On July 30, 2021, "Skate" was released as the album's second single with a video. It reached number 14 on the Billboard Hot 100, number four on the Hot R&B/Hip-Hop Songs chart, and number 12 in New Zealand. On November 5, 2021, a week before the album's launch, "Smokin out the Window" was released as its third single. It peaked at numbers five and two on the US Billboard Hot 100 and Hot R&B/Hip-Hop Songs, respectively, and peaked at number four on the New Zealand chart.

On October 8, 2021 Silk Sonic announced a release date of November 12, 2021. Mars and .Paak then postponed its release until January 2022 because they wanted to include more songs. An Evening with Silk Sonic was praised by music critics when it was released. It is the most-acclaimed studio album of Mars' career and .Paak's second-most-acclaimed, after Malibu (2016). The album debuted at number two on the Billboard 200, and was Mars's second and .Paak's first record to debut at number one on the Top R&B/Hip-Hop Albums chart. In Canada, the album debuted and peaked at number three. It was Mars's fourth album to reach the top three and .Paak's highest-charting record to date.

=== 2022–2024: Concert residency and music awards ===
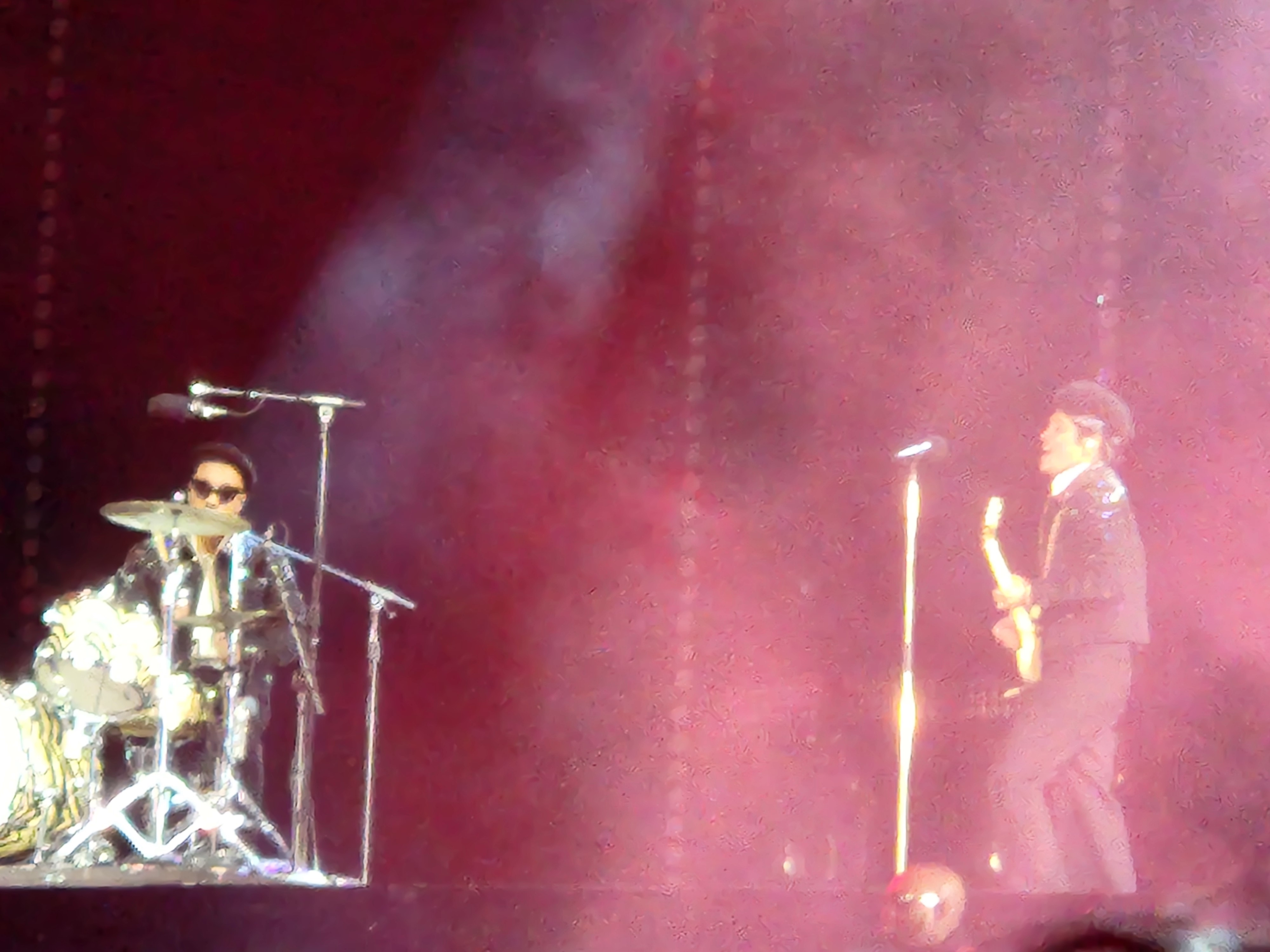
Silk Sonic performing in 2026 at The Romantic Tour (2026)

On February 3, 2022, their appearance in Fortnite was announced. Silk Sonic began a concert residency, An Evening with Silk Sonic at Park MGM, on February 25 at the Park Theater in Las Vegas. It was nominated for Favorite Residency at the iHeartRadio Music Awards. At the 64th Annual Grammy Awards, the duo performed "777" as the opening act.

"Love's Train" (a cover of Con Funk Shun's "Love's Train") was released on Valentine's Day. In February, the song was added to Silk Sonic's debut album on digital and streaming services and was included on the webstore-exclusive vinyl recording. On April 21, Billboard reported that "Love's Train" would be the album's fourth single. The duo performed "Love's Train" at the 2022 Billboard Music Awards. "After Last Night", with Thundercat and Collins, was released on July 5 as An Evening with Silk Sonic's fifth single. The song's performance was influenced by the release of its parent album; it topped the Billboard Adult R&B Songs chart, the fourth single from Silk Sonic's debut album to do so. The album was the second with four number-one singles on that chart. In late 2022, Lucky Daye affirmed he was in studio with Silk Sonic during the creation of their debut studio album. Daye also revealed that he was probably considered to join the duo, which D'Mile denied.

Silk Sonic received the BET Award for Best Group in 2021 and 2022. The duo was International Group of the Year at the Brit Awards 2022. "Leave the Door Open" was Record of the Year and Song of the Year at the 64th Grammy Awards. "Smokin out the Window" was Video of the Year at the BET Awards and Soul Train Music Awards. An Evening with Silk Sonic was Album of the Year at the BET Awards. The duo did not submit the album for Grammy consideration; Mars said, "We truly put our all on this record, but Silk Sonic would like to ... bow out of submitting our album this year". "Love's Train" won Outstanding Duo, Group or Collaboration (Traditional) at the 2023 NAACP Image Awards.

=== 2024–present: The Romantic Tour ===
In September 2024, .Paak denied that the duo was defunct: "Silk Sonic always has a place to put out more music". Furthermore, five of Silk Sonic's songs are being performed during Mars's The Romantic Tour (2026), with .Paak. In 2026, .Paak affirmed making a new album was a possibility.

== Artistry ==
=== Influences ===
In an interview with New Zealand radio DJ Zane Lowe for radio station Apple Music 1, Mars said that most of the album is "rooted in [.Paak's] drum beats". He continued that he works "backward from the guitar or piano", and .Paak's "music is percussion-driven, derived from old-school Motown influence." They credit each other for Silk Sonic's sound.

.Paak said that Mars considers every detail of a song, such as its theme, its sounds, and how it would engage people with the chorus; .Paak is more of a free-form, perceptive, and "What's the vibe?" musician. .Paak affirmed that they were inspired by the 1960s, 1970s, and "the old school". According to Mars, they reunited in the studio at night to drink and play music they enjoy. .Paak said that they were influenced by Aretha Franklin, James Brown, Miles Davis, Stevie Wonder, and Prince. The duo "bonded over their love of classic soul", and would play songs they loved for each other. .Paak was unsure that Silk Sonic would have become a reality without the COVID-19 pandemic, since they would have been playing shows at the time.

=== Musical style and themes ===
Silk Sonic's musical style has been described as rooted in R&B, soul, funk, pop, and hip-hop. They have been described as disco-inspired. About An Evening with Silk Sonic, an article on The Ringer said: "[T]hough styled as a 1960s to '70s retro endeavor, Silk Sonic isn't a work of nostalgia but rather a fusion: funk, rap, and R&B as they've sounded in heavy rotation as recently as the 2000s." Sputnikmusic called the album "rich and authentic, existing at the irresistible intersection between 70s funk nostalgia and the luxuries of a modern day studio. As a result, An Evening With Silk Sonic lives up to its billing as a true experience: it’s sexy, ever-so-smooth, and radiates confidence and charisma."

To achieve the sound for which they were aiming, Silk Sonic and Moniz reached out to elderly "session guys" and read "old drumming magazines". They needed the right gear, such as Ludwig Drums with Remo Ambassador heads, Giovanni Hidalgo congas, a Hohner Clavinet D6 keyboard, a Danelectro sitar, a Trophy Music mini-Glockenspiel, and a Solid State Logic mixing board. They were then "emulating old-school playing styles and recording them", using one or two mics and several musicians playing at the same time in the same place. Despite having all the instruments to re-create the sound, they were unable to do so at that time. According to .Paak, they were "fucking bashing"; those who came before them were "tiptoeing". The album explores seduction, romance, reconciliation and materialism.

=== Showmanship ===
Silk Sonic is known for their retro showmanship, which has been praised by tour critics and reviewers. Melinda Sheckells of Billboard wrote that "it felt impossible that Mars and .Paak had never done a show of this magnitude before as a duo". Rolling Stone's Mark Gray called their concert a "soulful, energetic vibe blending disco, funk, R&B, and rock" ... "From the fashion to the footwork, the show was a masterclass in Seventies nostalgia." Brock Radke of Las Vegas Weekly called their show "enthralling and celebratory"; the duo "isn't transporting the audience to another era so much as pulling that era's amazing music into the present day". Mya Abraham of Vibe found the concert a Soul Train experience; the "lighting elevated the show", and the duo studied "incomparable performers of the past". The concert "was a well-sequenced, true mastery in visual storytelling".

== Tour ==
Silk Sonic

- Bruno Mars – lead vocals, congas, guitar, piano (2021 – present)
- Anderson .Paak – lead vocals, drums, rapping (2021 – present)

The Hooligans and touring members (Note: The Hooligans (excluding Philip Lawrence and Phredley Brown))

- Jamareo Artis – bass guitar (2022)
- Eric Hernandez – drums (2022)
- Kameron Whalum – backing vocals (2022)
- Dwayne Dugger – saxophone (2022)
- James King – backing vocals (2022)
- John Fossit – keyboards (2022)
- Mateus Asato – lead guitar (2022)
- Maurice "Mobetta" Brown – trumpet (2022)

== Discography ==
=== Studio albums ===
List of studio albums, with selected details, chart positions and certifications
Title	Details	Peak chart positions										Sales	Certifications
Title	Details	US	US R&B/HH	AUS	CAN	DEN	IRE	NLD	NZ	SWI	UK	Sales	Certifications
An Evening with Silk Sonic	Released: November 12, 2021; Label: Atlantic, Aftermath; Formats: CD, LP, digital download, streaming	2	1	4	3	5	5	4	3	5	9	US: 42,000	RIAA: Platinum; BPI: Gold; IFPI DEN: Gold; MC: Platinum; NVPI: Gold; RMNZ: 2× Platinum

=== Singles ===
List of singles, with year released, selected chart positions, certifications, and album name shown
Title	Year	Peak chart positions										Certifications	Album
Title	Year	US	US R&B/HH	AUS	CAN	IRE	NLD	NZ	SWI	UK	WW	Certifications	Album
"Leave the Door Open"	2021	1	1	10	9	18	13	1	23	20	2	RIAA: 2× Platinum; ARIA: Gold; BPI: Platinum; IFPI DEN: Platinum; MC: 5× Platinum; NVPI: Gold; RMNZ: 4× Platinum	An Evening with Silk Sonic
"Skate"	2021	14	4	32	19	48	61	12	74	45	18	BPI: Silver; MC: Platinum; RMNZ: Platinum	An Evening with Silk Sonic
"Smokin out the Window"	2021	5	2	8	10	11	31	4	92	12	12	RIAA: 2× Platinum; BPI: Gold; IFPI DEN: Gold; MC: 2× Platinum; RMNZ: 2× Platinum	An Evening with Silk Sonic
"Love's Train"	2022	— (Note: "Love's Train" did not enter the Billboard Hot 100, but peaked at number 11 on the Bubbling Under Hot 100 chart.)	47	—	—	—	—	— (Note: "Love's Train" did not enter the NZ Top 40 Singles Chart, but peaked at number 18 on the NZ Hot Singles Chart.)	—	—	—		An Evening with Silk Sonic
"After Last Night" (with Thundercat and Bootsy Collins)	2022	68	17	—	92	—	—	— (Note: "After Last Night" did not enter the NZ Top 40 Singles Chart, but peaked at number eight on the NZ Hot Singles Chart.)	—	—	78	MC: Platinum; RMNZ: Platinum	An Evening with Silk Sonic
"—" denotes a single that did not chart or was not released in that territory.

=== Promotional singles ===
List of promotional singles, with year released, selected chart positions, and album name shown
Title	Year	Peak chart positions				Album
Title	Year	US Bub.	US R&B/HH	NZ Hot	WW	Album
"Silk Sonic Intro"	2021	14	48	34	176	An Evening with Silk Sonic

=== Other charted songs ===
List of other charted songs, with year released, selected chart positions, and album name shown
Title	Year	Peak chart positions								Certifications	Album
Title	Year	US	US R&B/HH	CAN	IRE	NLD	NZ Hot	UK	WW	Certifications	Album
"Fly as Me"	2021	81	23	93	51	75	9	49	92	MC: Gold	An Evening with Silk Sonic
"Put on a Smile"	2021	78	22	—	—	—	10	—	103		An Evening with Silk Sonic
"777"	2021	— (Note: "777" did not enter the Billboard Hot 100, but peaked at number four on the Bubbling Under Hot 100 chart.)	35	—	—	—	—	—	132		An Evening with Silk Sonic
"Blast Off"	2021	73	20	95	—	—	—	—	74		An Evening with Silk Sonic
"—" denotes a single that did not chart or was not released in that territory.

== Awards and nominations ==
Organization	Year	Category	Work	Result	Ref.
American Music Awards	2021	Favorite Duo or Group – Pop	Silk Sonic	Nominated	
American Music Awards	2021	Favorite Music Video	"Leave the Door Open"	Nominated	
American Music Awards	2021	Favorite Song – R&B	"Leave the Door Open"	Won	
American Music Awards	2022	Favorite R&B Album	An Evening with Silk Sonic	Nominated	
American Music Awards	2022	Favorite R&B Song	"Smokin out the Window"	Nominated	
BET Awards	2021	Best Group	Silk Sonic	Won	
BET Awards	2021	Video of the Year	"Leave the Door Open"	Nominated	
BET Awards	2021	Viewer's Choice Award	"Leave the Door Open"	Nominated	
BET Awards	2022	Best Group	Silk Sonic	Won	
BET Awards	2022	Video of the Year	"Smokin out the Window"	Won (Note: Tied with Baby Keem and Kendrick Lamar for "Family Ties".)	
BET Awards	2022	Album of the Year	An Evening with Silk Sonic	Won	
Billboard Music Awards	2022	Top Duo/Group	Silk Sonic	Nominated	
Billboard Music Awards	2022	Top R&B Artist	Silk Sonic	Nominated	
Billboard Music Awards	2022	Top R&B Album	An Evening with Silk Sonic	Nominated	
Billboard Music Awards	2022	Top R&B Song	"Leave the Door Open"	Won	
Brit Awards	2022	International Group of the Year	Silk Sonic	Won	
Grammy Awards	2022	Record of the Year	"Leave the Door Open"	Won	
Grammy Awards	2022	Song of the Year	"Leave the Door Open"	Won	
Grammy Awards	2022	Best R&B Performance	"Leave the Door Open"	Won (Note: Tied with Jazmine Sullivan for "Pick Up Your Feelings".)	
Grammy Awards	2022	Best R&B Song	"Leave the Door Open"	Won	
iHeartRadio Music Awards	2022	Song of the Year	"Leave the Door Open"	Nominated	
iHeartRadio Music Awards	2022	Best Duo/Group of the Year	Silk Sonic	Won	
iHeartRadio Music Awards	2022	R&B Album of the Year	An Evening with Silk Sonic	Won	
iHeartRadio Music Awards	2022	R&B Song of the Year	"Leave the Door Open"	Won	
iHeartRadio Music Awards	2022	R&B Artist of the Year	Silk Sonic	Nominated	
iHeartRadio Music Awards	2022	Best Lyrics	"Leave the Door Open"	Nominated	
iHeartRadio Music Awards	2022	Best Music Video	"Leave the Door Open"	Nominated	
iHeartRadio Music Awards	2023	Best Duo/Group of the Year	Silk Sonic	Nominated	
iHeartRadio Music Awards	2023	R&B Artist of the Year	Silk Sonic	Nominated	
iHeartRadio Music Awards	2023	R&B Song of the Year	"Smokin out the Window"	Nominated	
iHeartRadio Music Awards	2023	Favorite Residency	An Evening with Silk Sonic at Park MGM	Nominated	
MTV Europe Music Awards	2021	Best Group	Silk Sonic	Nominated	
MTV Europe Music Awards	2021	Best Collaboration	"Leave the Door Open"	Nominated	
MTV Video Music Awards	2021	Group of the Year	Silk Sonic	Nominated	
MTV Video Music Awards	2021	Song of the Year	"Leave the Door Open"	Nominated	
MTV Video Music Awards	2021	Best R&B	"Leave the Door Open"	Won	
MTV Video Music Awards	2021	Best Editing	"Leave the Door Open"	Won	
MTV Video Music Awards	2022	Group of the Year	Silk Sonic	Nominated	
NAACP Image Awards	2022	Outstanding Album	An Evening with Silk Sonic	Nominated	
NAACP Image Awards	2022	Outstanding Duo, Group or Collaboration (Traditional)	"Leave the Door Open"	Won	
NAACP Image Awards	2022	Outstanding Music Video/Visual Album	"Leave the Door Open"	Nominated	
NAACP Image Awards	2022	Outstanding Soul/R&B Song	"Leave the Door Open"	Nominated	
NAACP Image Awards	2023	Outstanding Duo, Group or Collaboration (Traditional)	"Love's Train"	Won	
Soul Train Music Awards	2021	Song of the Year	"Leave the Door Open"	Won	
Soul Train Music Awards	2021	The Ashford & Simpson Songwriter's Award	"Leave the Door Open"	Won	
Soul Train Music Awards	2021	Video of the Year	"Leave the Door Open"	Won	
Soul Train Music Awards	2022	Album of the Year	An Evening with Silk Sonic	Nominated	
Soul Train Music Awards	2022	Video of the Year	"Smokin out the Window"	Won	
Soul Train Music Awards	2022	Best Dance Performance	"Smokin out the Window"	Nominated	
