= Charles Moniz =

Canadian recording engineer

Charles Moniz is a Canadian recording engineer who worked on Bruno Mars's studio albums Unorthodox Jukebox and 24K Magic. He also recorded "All I Ask" for Adele's 2015 studio album 25. For his recordings with Mars and Adele, Moniz has won multiple Grammy Awards. Out of his six Grammys, Moniz is a three-time winner of the Grammy Award for Record of the Year and two-time winner of the Grammy Award for Album of the Year. He has also received the Grammy Award for Best Engineered Album, Non-Classical. Outside of engineering, Moniz played for the Canadian hardcore band Grade and was the bass guitarist for Avril Lavigne from 2002 to 2007.

== Early life ==
Moniz grew up in Burlington, Ontario and began to play the drums when he was nine years old.

== Career ==
Moniz began his music career with the Canadian hardcore band Grade and remained with them until 2001. From 2002 to 2007, Moniz was the bass guitarist for Avril Lavigne. In 2010, he continued playing bass guitar for Bruno Mars before becoming Mars's audio engineer. As an engineer, Moniz first worked on Mars's 2012 studio album Unorthodox Jukebox and contributed to "Locked Out of Heaven". In 2015, he recorded the Adele song "All I Ask" for her album 25 and recorded Ronson and Mars' song "Uptown Funk". His latest work with Mars was on his 2016 studio album 24K Magic. In 2021, he worked with Mars and Anderson .Paak on their debut studio album, as Silk Sonic, An Evening with Silk Sonic.

== Awards ==
During the 58th Annual Grammy Awards held in 2016, Moniz won the Grammy Award for Record of the Year for "Uptown Funk". The following year, Moniz received the Grammy Award for Album of the Year in 2017 for 25 at the 59th Annual Grammy Awards. In 2018, Moniz received the Record and Album of the Year awards for 24K Magic. Moniz additionally received the Grammy Award for Best Engineered Album, Non-Classical for the Bruno Mars album during the 60th Annual Grammy Awards. In 2022, Moniz won Record of the Year for "Leave the Door Open" at the 64th Annual Grammy Awards.
