= John Hanes (sound engineer) =

American audio engineer

John Hanes is an American audio engineer and mixing engineer. As of 2024, Hanes is the holder of 16 Grammy Awards for work on records including Uptown Funk, Stronger by Kelly Clarkson, 1989 by Taylor Swift and 25 by Adele, as well as four TEC Awards.

Hanes moved to Virginia Beach to work with Teddy Riley, where he began collaboration with Serban Ghenea. Ghenea and Hanes set up a studio, MixStar Studios, in 2001.
