= Bruno Mars =

American singer-songwriter (born 1985)

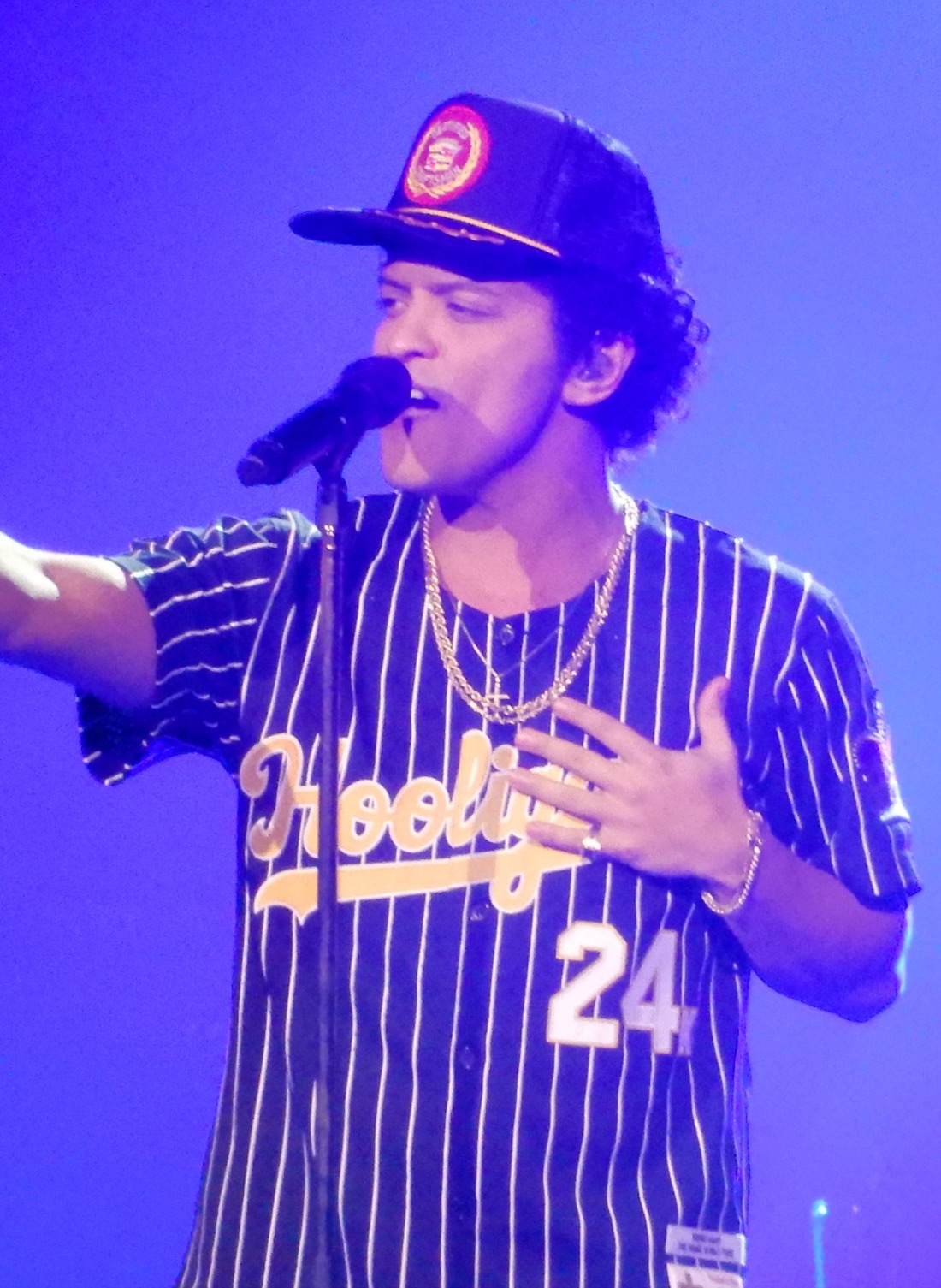
- Mars in 2017
- Born: Peter Gene Hernandez; October 8, 1985 (age 41); Honolulu, Hawaii, U.S.
- Occupations: Singer; songwriter; record producer; dancer
- Years active: 1990–present
- Works: Discography; songs recorded; songs written; videography
- Partner: Jessica Caban (2011–2024)
- Awards: Full list
- Musical career
- Genres: Pop; R&B; funk; soul
- Instruments: Vocals; guitar; piano; keyboards; drums; percussion
- Labels: Universal Motown; Atlantic; Elektra
- Member of: The Hooligans; Silk Sonic
- Formerly of: The Smeezingtons; Shampoo Press & Curl
- Website: brunomars.com

Peter Gene Hernandez (born October 8, 1985), known professionally as Bruno Mars, is an American singer-songwriter, record producer, and dancer. Regarded as a pop icon, he is known for his three-octave tenor vocal range, retro showmanship, musical versatility, and live performances, accompanied by his band, the Hooligans. Raised in Honolulu, Mars gained recognition in Hawaii as a child for his impersonation of Elvis Presley, before moving to Los Angeles in 2003 to pursue a musical career.

Mars established his name in the music industry as a songwriter and co-founder of the production team the Smeezingtons. He rose to fame as a recording artist after featuring on the US number-one single "Nothin' on You" (2009) by B.o.B. Mars's first three studio albums—Doo-Wops & Hooligans (2010), Unorthodox Jukebox (2012), and 24K Magic (2016)—found critical and commercial success, with the lattermost winning the Grammy Award for Album of the Year. During the 2010s, Mars achieved further success with the US chart-topping singles: "Just the Way You Are", "Grenade", "Locked Out of Heaven", "When I Was Your Man", "That's What I Like", and "Uptown Funk", which became Billboard's best-performing song of the decade.

In 2021, Mars released An Evening with Silk Sonic alongside Anderson .Paak, as the musical superduo Silk Sonic. The album featured the US number-one single "Leave the Door Open". In 2024, he released two record-breaking number-one duets, "Die with a Smile" (with Lady Gaga) and "APT." (with Rosé). His first solo album in ten years, The Romantic (2026), was led by the global chart-toppers "I Just Might" and "Risk It All".

Mars has sold over 150 million records worldwide, making him one of the best-selling music artists of all time. He amassed ten number-one singles on the Billboard Hot 100 and spent a record 31 weeks atop the Billboard Global 200. Mars is the only artist to surpass 150 million monthly listeners on Spotify and the first to receive six diamond-certified songs by the Recording Industry Association of America (RIAA). Mars's accolades include 16 Grammy Awards, 17 American Music Awards, 9 Billboard Music Awards, 5 Brit Awards, 7 MTV Video Music Awards and 14 Soul Train Awards. Time named him among the 100 most influential people in the world in 2011.

== Life and career ==
=== 1985–2003: Early life and musical beginnings ===
Peter Gene Hernandez was born on October 8, 1985, in Honolulu, Hawaii, to Peter Hernandez and Bernadette San Pedro Bayot. He was raised in the Waikīkī neighborhood of Honolulu. His father, originally from Brooklyn, New York, was of Puerto Rican and Ashkenazi Jewish descent, with ancestral roots in Hungary and Ukraine. His mother emigrated from the Philippines to Hawaii and was of Filipino ancestry. Hernandez's parents met while performing in a show—his mother as a hula dancer and his father as a percussionist. At the age of two, he was nicknamed "Bruno" by his father, who thought he resembled professional wrestler Bruno Sammartino.

Mars is one of six children and came from a musical family who exposed him to a diverse mix of musical genres, including rock and roll, reggae, hip-hop, and rhythm and blues. His mother was a singer and a dancer and his father performed Little Richard's music, which inspired him as a young child. His uncle, an Elvis impersonator, encouraged the three-year-old Mars to perform songs by Presley and Michael Jackson. Mars began performing five days a week with his family's band (the Love Notes) at age four, including at the Sheraton Waikiki, and became known in Hawaii for his onstage impersonation of Elvis Presley. At one point, he urinated on himself during a performance of Presley's "Can't Help Falling in Love" when he was five; his parents thought they might be making a mistake, but he never wavered. Mars appeared in the Hawaiian tabloid shopper MidWeek as "Little Elvis" in 1990, and performed in the halftime show of the 1990 Aloha Bowl.

He had a cameo role in the 1992 film Honeymoon in Vegas, and was interviewed by Pauly Shore on MTV. When Mars was six years old, he appeared on The Arsenio Hall Show. He performed two shows a night throughout grade school with his family's band, covering Frankie Lymon and Little Anthony songs. The young Mars had a small drum set, guitar, piano and percussion instruments, and learned to play them. His parents divorced when he was 12 (ending the Love Notes), and his father's varied businesses failed. Mars, his brother and father lived in the "slums of Hawaii" in a car, on rooftops, and in a closed bird zoo (Paradise Park) where his father had worked. Mars changed schools and was bullied, but later became popular.

His Elvis impersonations had a major impact on his musical evolution and performing technique. Mars began playing guitar, inspired by American rock guitarist Jimi Hendrix. In 2010, he acknowledged his Hawaii-raised roots and musical family as an influence: "Growing up in Hawaii made me the man I am. I used to do a lot of shows in Hawaii with my father's band. Everybody in my family sings, everyone plays instruments ... I've just been surrounded by it." At President Theodore Roosevelt High School in Honolulu, Mars sang in a group (the School Boys) who opened for his father's new band with songs by the Isley Brothers and the Temptations. He became well known in local Hawaii entertainment in high school, opening for a large magic show and impersonating Michael Jackson for $75 per performance.

After his sister in Los Angeles played a demo of Mars for Mike Lynn (head of A&R at Dr. Dre's Aftermath Entertainment label), Lynn summoned Mars to Los Angeles. In 2003, shortly after graduating from high school, Mars pursued a musical career. He lived on Mansfield Avenue, and was surprised by its poverty and squalor. Mars adopted his stage name from his father's childhood nickname, adding "Mars" at the end: "I felt like I didn't have no pizzazz, and a lot of girls say I'm out of this world, so I was like I guess I'm from Mars." His stage name was also an effort to "avoid being stereotyped", since the music industry tried to pigeonhole him as another Latin artist and tried to convince him to sing in Spanish.

=== 2004–2008: Career beginnings ===
Mars said about moving to Los Angeles to pursue a musical career:

I'd always been a working musician in Hawaii and never had problems paying rent. And then it's like, "Now I'm in L.A. and my phone's getting shut off". That's when reality hit. I started DJing. I told this person I could DJ because they said they could pay me $75 cash under the table. I didn't know how to DJ. I lost that job pretty quick.

Mars signed a contract with Motown Records in 2004, but the deal "went nowhere" and he had a fruitless conversation with will.i.am's management. However, the singer's experience with Motown proved beneficial. After Mars was dropped by the label, less than a year later, he remained in Los Angeles and landed a 2005 music-publishing deal with record producers Steve Lindsey and Cameron Strang at Westside Independent. According to Strang, "Bruno came to the conclusion that the best way to further his career was writing and producing hit songs."

Lindsey showed Mars and fellow songwriters Brody Brown and Jeff Bhasker (whom Mars met through Mike Lynn) the ins and outs of writing pop music and acted as a mentor, helping them hone their craft. Bhasker explained that Lindsey would "mentor us, and kind of give us lectures as to what a hit pop song is, because you can have talent and music ability, but understanding what makes a hit pop song is a whole other discipline." According to Lindsey, he "held Mars back for five years while they learned an extensive catalog of hit music." Brown agreed in another interview. Mars played cover songs around Los Angeles in Sex Panther, a band with Bhasker and Eric Hernandez (Mars's brother, who became the drummer of the Hooligans).

When Philip Lawrence was told he should meet Mars, he was reluctant to do so since he did not have money for bus fare. Keith Harris, drummer for the Black Eyed Peas, told Lawrence: "Whatever it costs you to get out here, I'll reimburse you." Lawrence replied, "Just give me five dollars back for the bus." The pair began collaborating on songs for Mars, but received a number of rejections from record labels. Lawrence introduced Mars to Aaron Bay-Schuck, his future A&R manager at Atlantic Records, in 2006. After hearing him play a couple of songs on guitar, Bay-Schuck wanted to sign him immediately. It took about three years for Atlantic Records to sign Mars, however, because the label felt it was too early and he needed to develop as an artist.

=== 2008–2010: Production work and It's Better If You Don't Understand ===
Mars and Lawrence received a call in 2008 from Brandon Creed, who was seeking songs for a reunited Menudo. Creed liked their song "Lost", which was written for Mars, and bought it for $20,000. The sale enabled them to continue working, and Mars and Lawrence decided that they would write and produce songs for other artists. Eventually, Creed became Mars's manager for nine years.

Mars was a music producer before becoming a successful solo artist, writing songs for Alexandra Burke, Adam Levine, Brandy, Sean Kingston, and K'naan. He said that the first "big hit" he and Lawrence wrote was the 2009 single, "Right Round", by Flo Rida: "That was our first taste of what could really happen with a hit we hundred-percented". Mars co-wrote the Sugababes's "Get Sexy" (2009) and provided backing vocals on their album, Sweet 7 (2010). He sang on the track "3D" on Far East Movement's second studio album, Animal (2009). Mars appeared on American pastor and hip hop artist Jaeson Ma's debut single, "Love", and American rapper Travie McCoy's "One at a Time" (a charity single for MTV's Staying Alive foundation) that year. He was recognized as a solo artist after appearing on American rapper B.o.B's "Nothin' on You" (2009) and McCoy's "Billionaire" (2010); both songs peaked in the top ten of several music charts, with the former topping the United States Billboard Hot 100 and the UK Singles Chart.

Mars said about the singles, "I think those songs weren't meant to be full-sung songs. If I'd sung all of 'Nothin' on You', it might've sounded like some '90s R&B." He released his debut extended play (EP), It's Better If You Don't Understand, on May 11, 2010. It peaked at number 99 on the US Billboard 200, and a music video was released for "The Other Side" with singer CeeLo Green and B.o.B. Mars and the Smeezingtons composed Green's successful 2010 single, "Fuck You".

=== 2010–2012: Doo-Wops and Hooligans ===
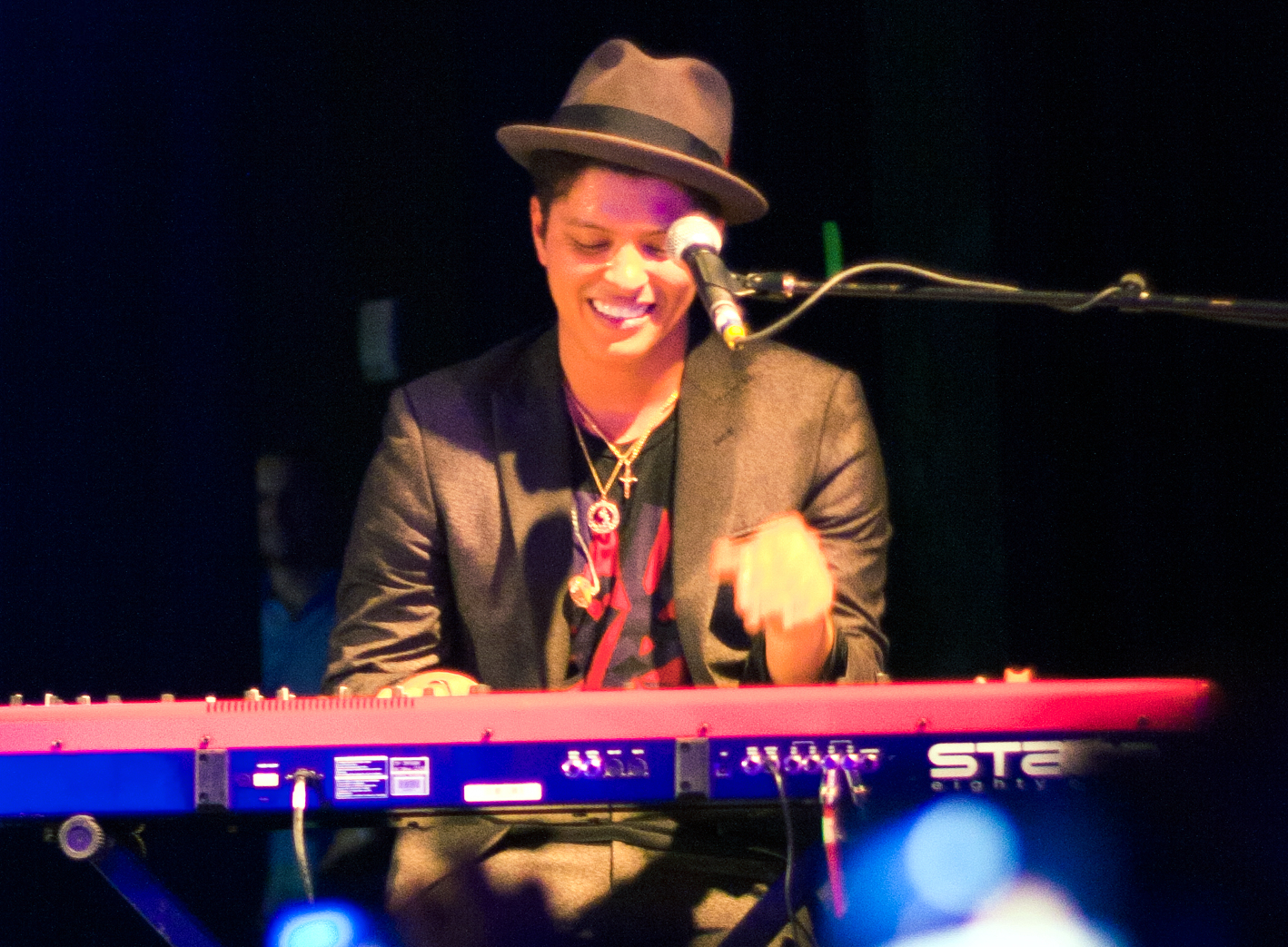
Mars at a 2010 concert in Houston, Texas

Mars released "Just the Way You Are" on July 20, 2010, as the lead single of his debut studio album, Doo-Wops & Hooligans, produced primarily by the Smeezingtons. It topped the charts of several countries, including Australia, Canada and the U.S. The album, released on October 5, 2010, debuted at number three on the Billboard 200 and topped the charts in the UK, the Netherlands and Canada. Doo-Wops & Hooligans has sold 15.5 million copies worldwide. It spawned two other singles: "Grenade" (which topped the Billboard Hot 100, New Zealand, UK, and other charts) and "The Lazy Song", which topped the UK and Danish charts.

Other singles include "Talking to the Moon", which was released in Brazil and topped Billboard Brasil's Hot Pop Songs and Hot 100 Airplay charts. "Marry You" was released internationally and "Count On Me" was the album's final single in Australia. Mars released "It Will Rain" on The Twilight Saga: Breaking Dawn – Part 1 film soundtrack (2011). The single reached number three in the U.S. and number two in New Zealand. He appeared on "Mirror" with rapper Lil Wayne, "Lighters" with the hip-hop duo Bad Meets Evil and "Young, Wild & Free" with rappers Wiz Khalifa and Snoop Dogg. The latter two songs reached the top ten in the US and other countries.

Mars began to promote his debut album as the opening act for Maroon 5 and OneRepublic on the fall leg of the former's Palm Trees & Power Lines Tour. On October 18, 2010, he began a co-headlining European concert tour with McCoy which lasted until early November. The Doo-Wops & Hooligans Tour, which Mars headlined, ran from November 2010 to January 2012. During this time, the co-headlining Hooligans in Wondaland Tour with Mars and Janelle Monáe played North American dates in May and June 2011. Mars turned down offers to open for arena tours, opting instead to play at smaller venues such as theaters and ballrooms; this was less lucrative, but expanded his fan base.

At the 2011 Grammy Awards, Mars won his first Grammy Award for Best Male Pop Vocal Performance for "Just the Way You Are" and received other six nominations: Best Rap Song, Best Rap/Sung Collaboration and Record of the Year for "Nothin' on You"; the latter category and Song of the Year for "Fuck You" by CeeLo Green, and Producer of the Year, Non-Classical (as the Smeezingtons). At the 2012 Grammy Awards, Mars was nominated for Album of the Year and Best Pop Vocal Album for Doo-Wops & Hooligans, and Best Pop Solo Performance, Record and Song of the Year for "Grenade"; Producer of the Year, Non-Classical (as the Smeezingtons). Mars received his first American Music Award for Favorite Pop/Rock Male Artist, International Male Solo Artist at the Brit Awards, and the Echo Award for Best International Male.

=== 2012–2015: Unorthodox Jukebox and Super Bowl XLVIII halftime show ===
In March 2012, Mars signed a worldwide publishing deal with BMG Chrysalis US. In a September 2012 interview for Billboard magazine, he affirmed his next album would be more varied musically: "I want to have the freedom and luxury to walk into a studio and say, 'Today I want to do a hip-hop, R&B, soul or rock record'". Unorthodox Jukebox was released on December 11, 2012, in the US. The album debuted at number two on the Billboard 200 before topping the chart. It also topped the charts in Australia, Canada and the UK. It has sold over six million copies worldwide.

"Locked Out of Heaven" was released in October 2012 and preceded the release of Unorthodox Jukebox, an album produced primarily by the Smeezingtons. The song topped the U.S. and Canadian charts and peaked at number two in the UK; it reached the top ten in several other countries. Other singles released from the album include "When I Was Your Man", "Treasure", "Gorilla" and "Young Girls". "When I Was Your Man" topped the Billboard Hot 100; except for Presley, no other male artist has had five number-one singles faster than Mars. The song peaked at number three in Canada, number two in the UK, and reached the top-ten in several other countries. Mars contributed vocals to the EDM trio Major Lazer's "Bubble Butt", released in May 2013. The single also includes the rappers Tyga and 2 Chainz and singer Mystic.

Mars's second headlining concert tour, the Moonshine Jungle Tour, lasted from June 2013 to October 2014. He announced his first concert residency, Bruno Mars at the Chelsea, Las Vegas. The tour grossed $156.4 million. On September 8, 2013, Mars was announced as headline performer at the Super Bowl XLVIII halftime show with the Red Hot Chili Peppers as guests. The first Super Bowl halftime show headlined by a performer under 30 in a decade. At the time, it was the most-watched halftime show in the history of the Super Bowl (115.3 million viewers, more than for the game itself).

At the 2014 Grammy Awards, Mars received the Best Pop Vocal Album award for Unorthodox Jukebox. "Locked Out of Heaven" was nominated for Record and Song of the Year, and "When I Was Your Man" was nominated for Best Pop Solo Performance. That year, the album received a Juno Award for International Album of the Year. Mars was cast as Roberto in the film Rio 2 (2014), and contributed to its soundtrack with the song "Welcome Back". On November 10, 2014, Mark Ronson released "Uptown Funk" with Mars. The song topped the charts in several countries, including Australia, Canada and New Zealand. "Uptown Funk" spent fourteen weeks atop the Billboard Hot 100 and seven weeks atop the UK Singles Chart, impacting pop culture.

=== 2016–2019: Super Bowl 50 halftime performance and 24K Magic ===
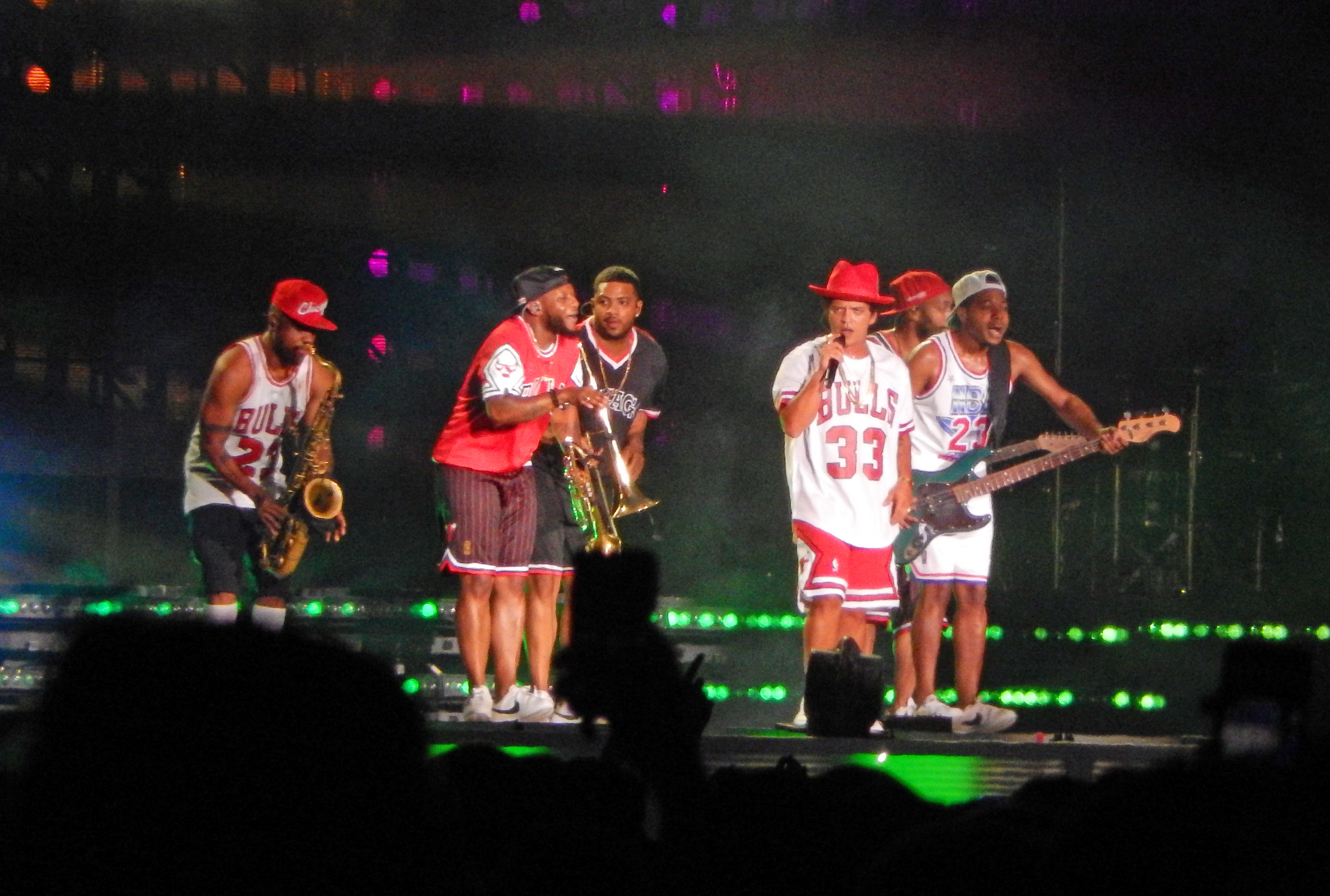
Mars and The Hooligans during the 24K Magic World Tour as part of the 2018 Lollapalooza festival in Chicago

In September 2014, Mars began working on his third studio album but had not come up with a date: "Until it's done ... It's gotta be just as good if not better". At the 2016 Grammy Awards, "Uptown Funk" earned Ronson and Mars a Grammy Award for Best Pop Duo/Group Performance and Record of the Year. A week earlier, Coldplay headlined the Super Bowl 50 halftime show with Mars and Beyoncé guesting; it was their second appearance on a Super Bowl halftime show. It was one of the most-watched halftime shows.

The album, scheduled for release in March, was postponed for several months due to Mars's Super Bowl halftime appearance; seven songs had been recorded. They were written primarily by Shampoo Press & Curl, a production team consisting of Mars, Lawrence and Brown which replaced the Smeezingtons. Mars began Gorilla Management, operated by Aaron Elharar, in May 2016. At the 2017 Grammy Awards, he shared the Album of the Year award as part of the Smeezingtons on Adele's "All I Ask" from 25 (2015). According to Guinness World Records 2017, Mars was the "First Male Artist to achieve three 10-million-selling-singles".

24K Magic, released on November 18, 2016, debuted at number two in Canada, France, New Zealand, and the US. It sold over five million copies globally. Its singles "24K Magic", "That's What I Like" and a remix of "Finesse" with rapper Cardi B, reached the top four of the US and the top-three in Canada. "That's What I Like" topped the Billboard Hot 100 and peaked at number four in New Zealand, while "Finesse" reached number two in New Zealand. "24K Magic" peaked at number one in France and New Zealand. Other singles include "Versace on the Floor" and "Chunky" (released in Australia). All singles appeared on the Hot R&B/Hip-Hop Songs; "That's What I Like" and "Finesse" topped.

In 2016, Mars began the concert residency Bruno Mars at Park MGM. His headlining tour, 24K Magic World Tour (2017–18), grossed more than $300 million. In November 2017, CBS aired the TV special Bruno Mars: 24K Magic Live at the Apollo. Mars received seven 2017 American Music Awards, including Artist of the Year, two for "That's What I Like" and another two for 24K Magic. He received the Album/Mixtape of the Year award and four others at the 2017 Soul Train Music Awards. At the 2018 Grammy Awards, Mars won all the categories he was nominated: Album of the Year and Best R&B Album for 24K Magic, Record of the Year for the title track and Song of The Year, Best R&B Performance, and Best R&B Song for "That's What I Like". 24K Magic received a Grammy Award for Best Engineered Album, Non-Classical.

According to Nile Rodgers, Mars worked on Chic's studio album It's About Time (2018). In early 2018, he worked with recording engineer Charles Moniz and the songwriting-and-recording Stereotypes. Mars and rappers Gucci Mane and Kodak Black released "Wake Up in the Sky" for Mane's thirteenth studio album, Evil Genius, in September of that year; it reached number 11 in the U.S. In February 2019, he and Cardi B released "Please Me". The single peaked at number three on the Billboard Hot 100, and reached the top 20 in Canada, New Zealand and the UK. Mars, Ed Sheeran and Chris Stapleton collaborated on "Blow" five months later for Sheeran's fourth studio album, No.6 Collaborations Project (2019).

=== 2020–2024: An Evening with Silk Sonic and world tour ===
A partnership was announced in February 2020 between Mars and Disney for a "music-themed theatrical narrative" in which the singer would star in and produce the film. A month later, it was confirmed that Mars was working on his next album with Babyface. During the COVID-19 lockdown, he wrote music every day for his upcoming album. That year, Mars sold part of his song catalog to Warner Chappell Music and kept a small share; his co-publishing contract with BMG was also part of the deal. In 2021, Mars was reportedly paid $3.2 million to perform at the Cape Cod wedding of the Motorola CEO's son.

On February 26, 2021, Mars and rapper Anderson .Paak announced that they recorded an album as Silk Sonic. An Evening with Silk Sonic, released on November 12 of that year, includes Bootsy Collins as a guest host. Primarily produced by Mars and D'Mile, debuted at number two on the Billboard 200 and in the top five in Australia, Canada and New Zealand. "Leave the Door Open", "Skate, "Smokin out the Window", a cover version of Con Funk Shun's "Love's Train", and "After Last Night" (with Thundercat and Bootsy Collins) were released as singles. "Leave the Door Open" topped the Billboard Hot 100 and New Zealand charts. All the singles except "Skate" topped the Billboard Adult R&B Songs chart, and the album was the second with four number-one singles on that chart.

In early 2022, Silk Sonic began their An Evening with Silk Sonic at Park MGM concert residency. They received Best Group at the BET Awards 2021, International Group of the Year at the 2022 Brit Awards, and the Outstanding Duo, Group or Collaboration, Traditional award at the 53rd NAACP Image Awards. Silk Sonic received three awards at the 2021 Soul Train Music Awards, including Song of the Year for "Leave the Door Open". At the 2022 Grammy Awards, they received Record of the Year, Song of The Year, Best R&B Performance and Best R&B Song awards for "Leave the Door Open". Silk Sonic received the 2022 BET Award for Album of the Year and Video of the Year; the video received the 2022 Soul Train Music Award for Best Video of the Year.

Mars and the Hooligans in Singapore during Mars's 2022–2024 tour

Mars continued his Bruno Mars at Park MGM concert residency in 2022, and began a world tour with shows in Sydney and Tokyo. The tour continued in 2023 in South Korea, the Philippines, Brazil, and Chile. After performing in Tel Aviv on October 4, a second Tel Aviv concert scheduled for October 7 along with a concert in Doha scheduled for the following day were cancelled due to the October 7 attack. In 2024, after dates in Tokyo, Bangkok and Singapore, the tour ended with a 14-show leg in Brazil. He performed shows at his concert residency alongside the tour. The 115 shows reported sold 2,218,000 million tickets and grossed $359.8 million.

=== 2024–present: The Romantic and Collaborations ===
Lady Gaga and Mars released their single, "Die with a Smile", on August 16, 2024. It was his first number-one on the Billboard Global 200, and topped the charts in Canada, the Netherlands, New Zealand, Switzerland and the U.S. The song received the Best Pop Duo/Group Performance award at the 2025 Grammy Awards and was nominated for Song of the Year. A month later, Rosé and Mars released "APT.", the lead single of Rosé's debut album Rosie (2024). It was Mars's second number-one on the Billboard Global 200, and topped Australia, Canada, Germany, the Netherlands and New Zealand charts. The song was for three awards at the 2026 Grammy Awards, including Song and Record of the Year. It won International Song of the Year at the Brit Awards 2026.

On January 24, 2025, Sexyy Red and Mars released "Fat Juicy & Wet". It entered the top ten of various Hip Hop and R&B charts. Mars produced a cover of Presley's "Burning Love" performed by Nyjah Music and Zyah Rhythm for Lilo & Stitch (2025). In June 2025, Mars was the featured artist for Fortnite Festival's ninth season; to commemorate, "Bonde do Brunão" was released as a single. In December 2025, Mars revealed that he and Rosé have worked in another song but have yet to release it.

On January 5, 2026, Mars tweeted that his next album was done. The Romantic was released on February 27, 2026. The album opened atop the Billboard 200 with 186,000 US equivalent album units. It also reached number one in Canada, number two in Australian and top three in the UK. The Romantic's lead single, "I Just Might" debuted atop the Billboard Hot 100, becoming his first song to do so and his tenth number-one overall. It also topped the charts in Canada and the Netherlands. "Risk It All" was released as the second single on February 27, 2026, alongside the album. It debuted at the top of the Billboard Global 200 and peaked at number two in New Zealand. Other singles include "On My Soul" (released in Italy) and "Dance with Me". On April 10, Mars embarked on The Romantic Tour, which is set to conclude in 2027.

In March 2026, Mars signed a global publishing deal with Avex Music Group. The partnership is expected to lead to a creative collaboration featuring him, such as an "APT"-style project influenced by Japanese culture. Not long after, MGM Resorts International named Park Avenue, the street between Park MGM and T-Mobile Arena, "Bruno Mars Drive". To commemorate the renaming of the avenue a parade and ceremony took place. MGM Resorts also confirmed plans with their partnership with the singer, possibly growing his brand presence both within and outside of Vegas, expanding to other MGM properties. On April 18, Mars released his first compilation album, titled Collaborations, which included eleven releases with other musicians. This was done to celebrate him becoming the 2026 Record Store Day ambassador. On August 7, 2026, Karol G and Mars released "Still".

== Artistry ==
=== Influences ===
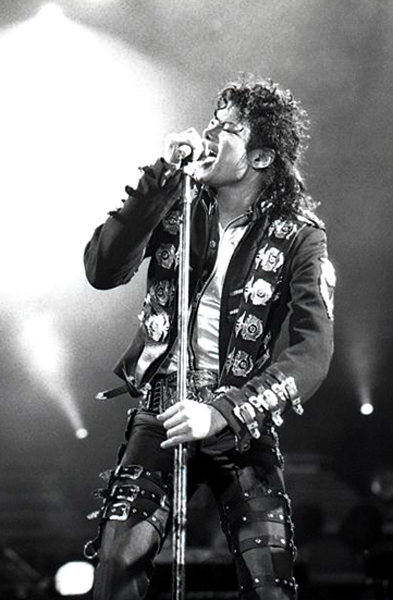
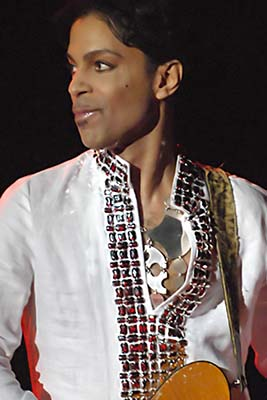
Mars's music has been influenced by Michael Jackson (left) and Prince (right)

Mars was raised on his father's 1950s doo-wop collection ("simple four-chord songs that got straight to the point") and on Little Richard, Frankie Lymon, Little Anthony, and Jerry Lee Lewis. As a child he impersonated Elvis Presley, affecting Mars's musical evolution:

I'm a big fan of 1950s Elvis when he would go on stage and scare people because he was a force and girls would go nuts! You can say the same thing for Prince or The Police. It's just guys who know that people are here to see a show, so I watch those guys and I love studying them because I'm a fan.

Mars also impersonated Michael Jackson (another inspiration), and hip-hop songs by The Neptunes and Timbaland which were played on the radio influenced him.

Mars's musical style initially gravitated towards R&B, and he was influenced by Keith Sweat, Jodeci, and R. Kelly. He noticed Jimmy Jam and Terry Lewis, New Edition, Bobby Brown, Boyz II Men, Teddy Riley and Babyface as a child, and listened to 1950s rock 'n' roll, doo-wop and Motown. Mars listened to Led Zeppelin and the Beatles in high school, and to singers with high voices such as Stevie Wonder and Freddie Mercury. Bob Marley and local bands in Hawaii gave Mars his reggae roots. Hip-hop acts like Jay-Z, the Roots and Cody Chesnutt were favorites, influencing his songwriting. Each musical genre has influenced the singer's style: "It's not easy to [create] songs with that mixture of rock and soul and hip-hop, and there's only a handful of them."

Other inspirations include Janet Jackson, Jimi Hendrix, Amy Winehouse, Sly Stone, Carlos Santana, George Clinton, and Usher. Mars said he is a fan of Alicia Keys, Jessie J, Jack White, the Saturdays, and Kings of Leon.

Regarding his dancing influences, Mars explained "anybody that was natural", including Tina Turner as she had the confidence of doing what she felt at the moment. Others included Jackson, Prince and Jackie Wilson as "there was a confidence born of the assurance of knowing what they look like onstage."

=== Musical style and themes ===
Mars's music has been noted for a variety of styles, musical genres, and influences including pop, R&B, funk, and soul. He also includes other elements such as disco, reggae, and rock in his work. His debut album, Doo-Wops & Hooligans, is primarily a pop, reggae pop and R&B record. Many of Mars's songs on the album have "feel-good", carefree, optimistic sentiments. Darker subjects in his songs, however, address failed relationships, pain and loneliness. Mars's subsequent release, Unorthodox Jukebox (like his debut album) is influenced by disco, funk, rock, reggae and soul, and balladry. His second album differs from the first lyrically, addressing traditional notions of romance, male chauvinism and sexuality; the explicit content in "Gorilla" sparked controversy in Australia. Mars's third album, 24K Magic, was influenced by R&B, funk, pop and new jack swing. Lyrically, the album involves money and sex. An Evening with Silk Sonic is the debut studio album by Silk Sonic, composed of Mars and Anderson .Paak. The album is rooted in R&B, soul, funk, hip hop and pop music. It explores themes of seduction, romance, reconciliation and materialism.

=== Voice ===
Mars has a three-octave tenor vocal range. Jon Caramanica of The New York Times called him one of the most "versatile and accessible singers in pop, with a light, soul-influenced voice that's an easy fit in a range of styles, a universal donor", and Tim Sendra of AllMusic described the singer's vocals on Doo-Wops & Hooligans as "the kind of smooth instrument that slips into your ear like honey." Jody Rosen of Rolling Stone called Mars a "nimble, soulful vocalist" on Unorthodox Jukebox. Jim Farber of the New York Daily News likened his voice to "the purity, cream and range of mid-period Michael Jackson" in a review of a concert promoting Unorthodox Jukebox. On 24K Magic, Consequence of Sound's Karen Gwen said that Mars showed his "pips" and pushed his vocals to the limit. She described his voice as a "clear, unapologetic tenor" and a modern-day "blessing". Jon Caramanica of The New York Times said that 24K Magic demonstrated the singer's vocal ability, from tenderness to "the more forceful side of his voice", while An Evening with Silk Sonic showed Mars's falsetto vocals.

=== Songwriting ===
Mars has described his writing process: "I don't sit down and think, 'I'm going to write a song'"; inspiration comes out of the blue in different places. Ideas occur suddenly to him and, occasionally, he can materialize them into lyrics. He has said that he typically writes songs by playing the guitar or piano. Mars plays drums, guitar, keyboard, bass, piano, ukulele, congas, and cowbell. He usually plays the instrumentation (or part of it) on his albums and the songs he composes for other artists.

Mars says his work with other artists influenced his music style: "'Nothin' on You' had a Motown vibe, 'Billionaire' was a reggae acoustic guitar-driven song, though one of my favorites is the CeeLo Green song. I don't think anyone else could've sung that song. And there's 'Just the Way You Are'. If you know my story, you know I love all different genres of music." Growing up in Hawaii has influenced his style, giving the songs a reggae sound: "In Hawaii some of the biggest radio stations are reggae. That music brings people together. It's not urban music or pop music. It's just songs. That's what makes it cross over so well. The song comes first."

Although music partner Philip Lawrence said that Mars has a darker side, most of his music is romantic: "I blame that on me singing to girls back in high school". Brody Brown, who has worked with Mars, said that the singer is in charge of the melody and lyrics of his tracks: "I'll just do the music, but Bruno does both. I chime in on some things with words, but the majority of the content is written by Bruno and Phil (Lawrence)."

=== Showmanship ===
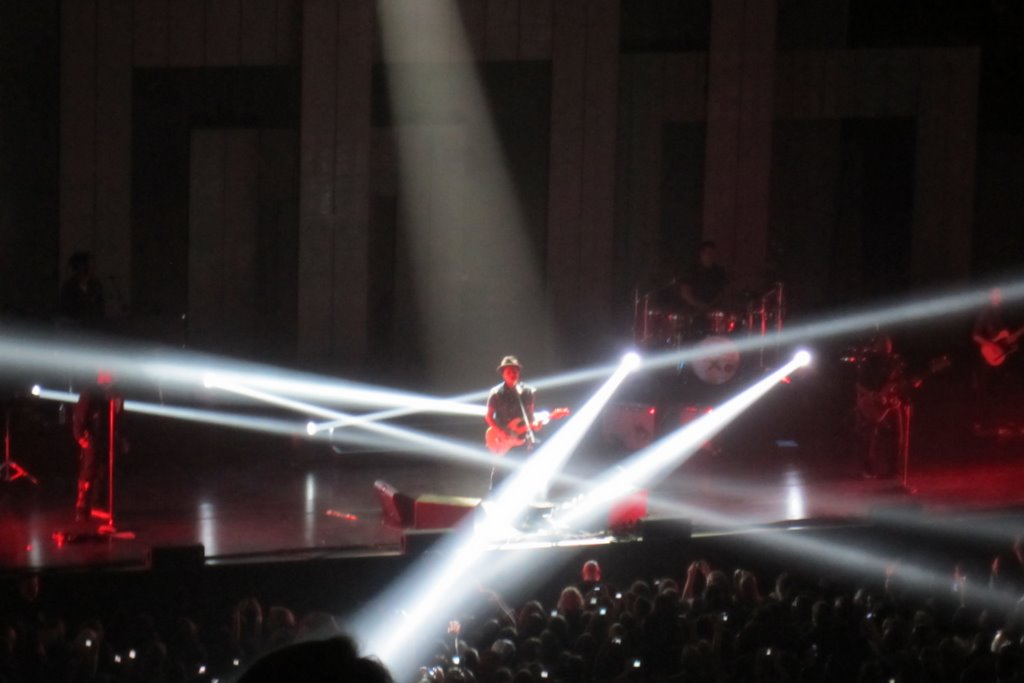
Mars and the Hooligans performing with strobe lights

Mars is known for his retro showmanship, which is acclaimed by tour critics. Deanna Ramsay of The Jakarta Post described Mars as a "truly global star". The Boston Herald's Jim Sullivan compared Mars's showmanship to that of Jackson and Presley. Kevin Johnson of the St. Louis Post-Dispatch called Mars a "consummate performer". The Boston Globe's Sarah Rodman said Mars shows an "indefatigable ecstatic approach to performing" and "classic showmanship". Jim Farber of the Daily News said Mars's Super Bowl XLVIII halftime show "[brought] old-school showmanship to [a] dynamic performance." Mars played videotapes of Elvis, James Brown and Jackson when he was younger. Now, before shows, he watches Brown's T.A.M.I. Show, Jimi Hendrix's Live at Woodstock or Prince performing "Purple Rain" (1984). In 2025, John Fossitt, keyboard player in The Hooligans, reveled that Mars watches videos of Brown and Jackson to learn how they interact with the public during live shows.

During the Doo-Wops & Hooligans Tour, Ara Jansan of The West Australian called the show "one of the most creative and exciting displays of musical artistry" she had seen in a long time and noted the concert attracted a wide-age-range audience. On the Hooligans in Wondaland Tour, the Oregonian's Robert Ham noted, that Mars grabbed the audience's attention during the entire concert and had considerable guitar skills. During the Moonshine Jungle Tour, Jason Lipshutz of Billboard described the singer's performance, "entertaining ...and he does a better job at it than almost anyone working in music right now". Rolling Stone ranked Mars 35th on its list of 50 Best Live Acts Right Now in 2013: "Anyone from the age of 5 to 95 can walk out of a Bruno Mars concert feeling like the show was designed just for them. Mars walks the old-school walk...he also nails the hits, leads a super-energetic nine-piece soul band, and rips a mean drum solo". NFL executives Sarah Moll and Tracy Perlman said, "If you go to his concerts, it's 11-year-old girls to 65-year-old women" after seeing the Moonshine Jungle tour several times during the summer of 2013. The 24K Magic World Tour was praised by critics for its showmanship, guitar skills and stage production. The tour received two Pollstar awards, two Billboard Music Awards, and a TEC Award. Bruno Mars at Park MGM residency won Top R&B Tour at the 2022 Billboard Music Awards. As of 2024, it is one of the highest-grossing residencies with $154.8 million.

Mars's concerts feature The Hooligans, including a guitarist, bassist, drummer, keyboardist and horn section, who are also dancers and background singers. Critics noted the difference the backup band and arrangements made to the live versions of the songs compared with the album versions. The shows contained all-band dancing arrangements, including Mars's footwork inspired by James Brown and the splits. The shows, influenced by disco, have a soul-revue-inspired set; long, mellow, soft interludes echoing the smooth contemporary R&B style popular during the 1990s are also included. The set lists blend several genres of music, including pop, doo-wop, funk, R&B, soul, and reggae. Mars's shows usually feature pyrotechnics, strobe and laser lighting, and he plays drums and guitar. In 2021, Pollstar named Mars the hip-hop/R&B touring artist of the 2010s.

=== Music videos ===
Mars has collaborated with several directors to produce his music videos, and has emerged as a music-video director. From 2010 to 2017, Mars co-directed ten music videos from his albums Doo-Wops & Hooligans, Unorthodox Jukebox, 24K Magic, and singles with Cameron Duddy. In 2011, Mars developed the second concept and treatment for "The Lazy Song" and brought in Duddy to co-direct its music video. In an interview, Duddy said that he and Mars "can fight...when it comes to doing music videos. The best collaborations are always fueled by opposite perspectives or alternative ideas. We always find a common ground."

In 2018, Mars co-directed the music video for "Finesse" with Florent Dechard. He collaborated with Dechard on music videos for "Please Me", "Blow", "Leave the Door Open" and "Skate". In 2024, Mars co-directed the Don Quijote campaign commercial with Daniel Ramos. The singer collaborated with Ramos on music videos for "Die with a Smile", "APT." and "Fat, Juicy and Wet".

Mars, who choreographed the video for "Treasure", received the Best Choreography award at the 2013 MTV Video Music Awards. Mars and Duddy's work was recognized at several awards shows, including two nominations for an MTV Video Music Award for Best Direction (for "Uptown Funk" and "24K Magic"). Mars's collaborations with Dechard earned them a nomination for Video Director of the Year at the 2019 BET Hip Hop Awards. In 2017, "That's What I Like" (directed by Mars and Jonathan Lia) led them to a nomination at the BET Awards 2017 for Video Director of the Year. The following year, Mars and Ben Winston's direction of Bruno Mars: 24K Magic Live at the Apollo (2017) earned them a nomination for a Primetime Emmy Award for Outstanding Music Direction. Mars and Dechard directed the video for "Leave the Door Open" in 2021, for which they received the BET Award for Video Director of the Year award. The video also received the 2021 MTV Video Music Award for Best Editing. In 2025, Mars and Ramos directed the videos for "Die with a Smile" and "APT." The former won Favorite Music Video at the American Music Awards, while the latter received an Best Collaboration Video (International) at the 2025 MTV Video Music Awards Japan.

=== Clothing ===
Mars wears outfits inspired by previous decades, and matches that aesthetic to his music. On Doo-Wops and Hooligans, the singer wore '60s-inspired suits and had faded hair; on 24K Magic, Mars channeled the 1980s and 1990s in sound and aesthetic. He imposed a dress code in the studio during the recording of that album, favoring jewelry and "fine clothes" over sweatpants to create "groovy, smooth and soulful songs". When Mars collaborated with Anderson .Paak on Silk Sonic in 2021, he wore the "wide collars, leisure suits, and funky patterns" common during the 1970s; this complemented their sound. For InStyle, Tessa Petak wrote: "Regardless of the decade he's emulating, Mars's fashion sense and stage presence make him larger-than-life".

== Band members ==
- Bruno Mars – lead vocals, guitars, keyboards (2010–present), congas (2026–present)
- Jamareo Artis – bass guitar (2010–present)
- Eric "E-Panda" Hernandez – drums (2010–present)
- Kameron Whalum – trombone (2010–present), backing vocals (2018–present)
- Dwayne Dugger – saxophone (2010–present), keyboards (2017–present)
- James King – trumpet (2010–present), backing vocals (2018–present)
- John Fossitt – keyboards (2012–present)
- Chris Payton – rhythm guitar, backing vocals (2026–present)
- Daniel Rodriguez – congas, percussion (2026–present)
- Enrique Sanchez – trumpet (2026–present)
- Jaron Regan – guitar (2026–present)
- Marcus Paul – backing vocals, trumpet (2026–present)
- Quintin Gulledge – keyboards, talkbox (2026–present)

=== Former members ===
- Philip Lawrence – backing vocals (2010–2018, 2022–2025)
- Kenji Chan – guitars (2010–2012)
- Phredley Brown – guitars (2012–2022), keyboards (2010–2012), backing vocals (2010–2022)
- Mateus Asato – guitars (2019, 2021, 2022–2023)
- Luke Kennedy Aiono – guitars (2023–2025)

== Other ventures ==
=== Endorsements and partnerships ===
Mars appeared in two commercials for Bench in 2011. He and model Joan Smalls were photographed in 1950s-influenced suits in Puerto Rico as part of the clothing line "La Isla Bonita" for Vogue. Mars invested in Chromatik, which makes digital versions of sheet music for the web and the iPad, the following year: "I love that Chromatik will bring better music education into schools. [...] And I'm happy to be a part of it." In 2013, Mars tweeted a picture of himself smoking an electronic cigarette. A press release reported his investment in the NJOY electronic-cigarette company "to quit smoking for his mother"; the singer "believe[d] in the product and the company's mission." Chromatik and NJOY have been acquired by TakeLessons and Marlboro, respectively.

In 2014, SelvaRey Rum began catering events and parties by Mars. He was introduced to the brand by co-founder Seth Gold the following year, and invested an undisclosed amount. In 2020, Mars redesigned the rum's taste, branding and packaging in a 1970s style. At that time, the brand was co-owned by Mars, Seth and Marc Gold, and Robert Herzig.

Mars released Lacoste x Ricky Regal, a luxury 1970s-inspired sportswear line with Lacoste, on March 5, 2021. Working with Lacoste creative director Louise Trotter to create a clothing line which blended his personality with Lacoste sportswear, he was involved with every aspect of the collection. When Mars and Trotter began to work, he adopted "an alter ego to help him think as a designer."

On July 29, 2022, Mars was ready to open the Pinky Ring, a lounge bar on the Las Vegas Strip replacing the Lily Bar & Lounge at the Bellagio; its name referred to the lyrics of "24K Magic" (2016). In October 2023, the bar was announced to open in early 2024. It is planned to include "moody" lighting, a specialty bar, live music, and DJs. The Pinky Ring opened on February 12, 2024, with the Hooligans performing every night of its first two weeks. Mars wore a pinky ring to celebrate the opening, created by Tiffany & Co. in yellow gold with the Pinky Ring initials framed in white diamonds on the front and "Pinky Ring 2024" on the back.

Mars's partnership with Fender on the "Bruno Mars Stratocaster", a limited-edition Fender Stratocaster in a color called "Mars Mocha Heirloom", was announced on November 7, 2023. The guitar, inspired by Mars's "retro style and showmanship", includes a "'69 neck profile modeled on Mars's own '69 Strat", "custom-voiced Fender Mars pickups" and "a leopard print strap, which pays homage to two of Mars's favorite guitar players, Jimi Hendrix and Prince". Mars said, "I don't think of myself as a guitar player. Every song is like a puzzle you have to solve, and a good guitar can bring something out of you that can help take you to the finish line."

In August 2024, Mars appeared in a commercial for the Japanese discount-store Don Quijote. He, dancers Miyu, Haruka, Miyuri and miku, and store mascot Donpen danced around the Mega Don Quijote store in Shibuya while picking up articles from its People Brand (Jōnetsu kakaku). Mars wrote the jingle and shared the commercial on his Instagram. The collaboration included limited-edition goods. According to Miyu, she was asked by Mars to featured in the commercial and told her he "wanted to do house dance." They practiced together in Japan, created the choreography and everyone designed the costumes.

In September 2024, Mars (as Ricky Regal) partnered with Stetson to release a new "silhouette inspired by the American heritage brand's early designs". Available in different colours, it includes a "gold-toned horseshoe pin with rhinestones" and a "Stetson x Ricky Regal liner featuring a red rose". Mars designed the collection's hat. In December 2024, Mars and Hello Kitty collaborated to celebrate Hello Kitty's 50th anniversary and the opening of Mars's Park MGM residency. Limited-edition merchandise and themed food and drink was available at Park MGM's Hello Kitty Cafe, and a Hello Kitty meet-and-greet was held that month. In June 2025, Regal and Stetson released a new cowboy hat, the "Regal 10X Straw". In June 2025, he was the featured artist for Season 9 of the Fortnite Festival, introducing a dedicated set of cosmetics within the game.

On January 30, 2026, Mars was announced as the 2026 Record Store Day ambassador. In celebration of the day's special releases at participating record shops, Mars released Collaborations, a compilation album which highlights his collaborative hits. In March 2026, Mars, as part of his Ricky Regal collaboration with Stetson issued 100 "cowboy hats" in black or fawn. The Regal Range 6x has a "rose motif and lettering that matches the aesthetic of The Romantic. It also includes a "gold-toned, rhinestone-studded horseshoe pin and removable feather details." Kitty and Mars partened for select tour stops during the latter's The Romantic Tour (2026), including Vegas, Chicago and Toronto, among others. The Mars pop-up shop include the full "Hello Kitty x Bruno Mars" exclusive collection, inspired by the tour with Kitty's character and Mars's style. Fans will be able to attend Kitty and Mars-inspired cafe activation's, Kitty themed food and beverages and a chance to meet Kitty. The first pop-up shop opens on April 9 at The Shoppes at Mandalay Place in Las Vegas.

=== Philanthropy ===
In 2014, it was announced that Mars had partnered with the Hawai'i Community Foundation and the Grammy Foundation to establish a Grammy Camp Scholarship Fund for qualified needs-based applicants from Hawaii. On September 27, 2017, he expanded his camp scholarship to applicants from throughout the United States. Mars established the partnership in honor of his mother.

Mars donated $100,000 in 2014 to the orphans of Bantay Bata, who were among the victims of Typhoon Haiyan. He performed at the Make It Right concert (whose goal was to "help build homes for people in need") and at the Robin Hood Foundation's 2014 annual benefit to "fight poverty in New York City by supporting nonprofit organizations." In 2017, Mars and Live Nation donated one million dollars from the show at Auburn Hills, Michigan's Palace to help victims of the Flint water crisis. Mars participated in the "Somos Una Voz" relief initiative to help survivors of Hurricane Maria in Puerto Rico, and Mexico's earthquake.

He donated 24,000 meals in 2018 to the Salvation Army Hawaiian & Pacific Islands Division's 48th annual Thanksgiving Dinner. In 2020, Mars donated $1 million to the MGM Resorts Foundation to assist MGM employees in financial difficulty due to the COVID-19 pandemic. That year, Mars and other artists donated autographed microphones to music-gear marketplace Reverb.com for sale "with all proceeds going to ten youth music education programs" affected by the COVID-19 pandemic. He created a protest sign with an Angela Davis quote for the Show Me the Signs auction to help families of black women killed by police.

Until the end of 2021, Mars donated all profits from SelvaRey Rum to Honolulu Community College's Music & Entertainment Learning Experience. That year he was part of the Keep Memory Alive Power of Love event. Proceeds supported services, care, and resources to patients with neurocognitive diseases and their caregivers. In 2022, Mars, Billie Eilish, Dua Lipa, Shawn Mendes, and Rosalía were named co-chairs for the Grammy Museum's Campaign for Music Education raising money for its educational programs. It gave people younger than 18 and college students free admission to the Los Angeles Grammy Museum and access to "music education programs".

In 2024, Mars performed a charity concert sponsored by Budweiser Brasil at the Tokio Marine Hall in São Paulo to help victims of the 2024 Rio Grande do Sul floods. In 2026, the singer made a donation to the future Intermountain Health Nevada Children's Hospital as he was honered in Las Vegas.

== Impact ==
Mars has been called a "pop icon" by The Philippine Star, Evansville Courier & Press, The Dickinson Press, and iHeartRadio. The Guardian's Michael Cragg identified "the Bruno Mars strategy": a "songwriter turned popstar", writing and producing hit singles for other artists and later appearing with them – according to The New Yorker, overshadowing the lead artists on the songs. Amanda Petrusich of The New Yorker described Mars as "arguably one of the most instinctive and enthralling showmen of his generation". Fuse TV credited him with bringing the "funkalicious vibes of retro pop and R&B back to modern music" in 2017, and The Independent's Roisin O'Connor later calling him the "king of retro crooning". In 2013, NPR Music writer Ann Powers called Mars "the most valuable pop historian" of the time. For BET in 2016, Damien Scott called Mars "the prince of pop music". In 2019, Margaret Farrell of Stereogum said that "Uptown Funk"'s success solidified Mars's "kingly pop stature".

A 2018 Billboard article said that no male artist in pop music during the 2010s had had a longer success streak than Mars, and Slate considered him "the most consistent male pop star of the 2010s". In 2021, WBLS said that Mars "has been a dominant force in popular culture for more than a decade". Two years later, The Times ranked Mars thirteenth of the 20 best 21st-century vocalists. The New York Times and Toronto Star described "Uptown Funk" as one of the century's most recognizable pop songs. About Mars's Puerto Rican roots and ethnic labels, Remezcla said that he was "the first proud Latino artist to make it" to the "top of international pop culture" while not following the music industry's "cynical labels game" and being pigeonholed. His music and showmanship have inspired AJ Mitchell, Benny Dayal, Dua Lipa, KiDi, Lee Brice, Lucky Daye, Meghan Trainor, Rauw Alejandro, Selena Gomez, Shawn Mendes, Thomas Rhett, and Victoria Monét.

Mars was named Billboard's 2013 Artist of the Year, and was a 2016 NRJ Artist of Honor in recognition of his contribution to music. The singer received an Innovator Award at the 2017 iHeartRadio Music Awards and a Visionary Award at the 2017 Teen Choice Awards. iHeartRadio Canada listed Mars as one its "Icons of the Decade" in 2019, and Insider gave him an honorable mention on its 2010s list. In 2021, Billboard ranked Mars the third Top Artist of the 2010s and 14th on its list of Top Touring Artists of the 2010s. Three years later, he was ranked 20th on Billboard's Greatest Pop Stars' 21st-century list. Kyle Dines called Mars "one of the century's great writers, performers and hitmakers, who essentially arrived to early-'10s pop already on top of the world and has scarcely left his perch since."

== Awards and achievements ==
Mars has received a number of awards and honors, including 16 Grammy Awards, 14 American Music Awards, 5 Brit Awards, 14 Soul Train Music Awards, and 10 Guinness World Records. At the 2018 Grammys, Mars was the second recipient of Record and Song of the Year with two songs from the same album. At the 2022 Grammys, he was the second three-time Record of the Year recipient. As of 2025, Mars holds the record for most nominations as a male artist for Record (eight) and Song of the Year (seven). In 2013, Billboard ranked him sixth on its list of Hot 100 Songwriters and in 2019 he was number 41 on the list of greatest all-time artists. In 2025, he made the list of Billboard's Top Songwriters of the 21st Century on the Hot 100 placed at number 10. Mars's former songwriting and record-production team, the Smeezingtons, received several accolades, including best songwriters of 2010 by Music Week. Time magazine included him on their annual Time 100 list in 2011.

"Just The Way You Are" spent 20 weeks (the longest debut) on the Adult Contemporary chart in the U.S. "When I Was Your Man" was the country's second number-one song with only piano and vocals. Mars is the first male artist to place two titles as a lead act in the U.S. top 10 simultaneously. He has ten number-one singles in the U.S. In 2018, he matched Beyonce and Mariah Carey as the only artists with three top-five singles in the U.S. from their first three studio albums. Mars, Sheeran and Jewel are the only artists with two songs to spend at least half a year in the U.S. top 10. In 2025, he was the first artist to spend 30 weeks at number one on the Billboard Global 200. He occupied both the number one and two on the Global 200 year-end list of 2025. Mars also became the fourth act in the US topping Billboard Hot 100 Year-End lists twice. In 2026, Mars became one of the artists with most number-one hits on Digital Song Sales. He is among the artists with most weeks at number one on the Billboard Hot 100. Mars was the first solo male artist with thirteen number-ones in the Pop Airplay chart. The singer and Carey as the only artists with four albums that have each produced at least two Radio Songs number ones.

In 2012, "Just the Way You Are" and "Grenade" were the best-selling digital singles of the year with sales of 12.5 million and 10.2 million; Mars was the year's biggest-selling artist. "Just The Way You Are", "Grenade", "Locked Out Of Heaven", and "When I Was Your Man" have each sold over 4 million digital copies, making him the first male artist to do so as a lead singer. Six of his singles appeared on multiple year-end top global singles lists published by the International Federation of the Phonographic Industry (IFPI). Mars has sold over 150 million records worldwide, making him one of the best-selling music artists of all time. "Uptown Funk" and "Grenade" were listed by several publications as among the decade's best songs. In 2022, he was the first artist with six Diamond-certified songs in the U.S.

Due to ticket reselling during the week after Mars's 2014 Super Bowl performance, Hawaii Senate president Donna Mercado Kim introduced Senate Resolution 12 (also known as the Bruno Mars Act). It limits all ticket purchases within 48 hours of the on-sale date to a physical box office, discouraging ticket scalping. The Hawaii state senate passed the law, which died in the conference committee. Billboard reported in September 2021 that Mars earned $604.4 million from concerts, one of less than 30 artists to cross the $600-million threshold.

Mars was the fastest-selling artist for his five 2022 shows in Japan, selling about 210,000 tickets. He sold 101,000 tickets for two concerts in Seoul the following year, the largest audience of Hyundai Card's Super Concert. In 2024, Mars was the first artist since Michael Jackson to sell out seven shows at the 55,000-capacity Tokyo Dome. His two concerts in Taiwan attracted 157,000 people. Mars played 14 concerts in Brazil that year, breaking RBD's 2006 13-show record for an international artist.

In early 2025, after the release of "Die With a Smile" with Lady Gaga and "APT." with Rosé, Mars had a record 150 million monthly listeners on Spotify. He was the second artist (after Sabrina Carpenter) "to replace himself at number one and take the top two spots" at the same time on the Billboard Global 200 and Global Excluding United States, and had the biggest debut by a male artist on the Global 200. "APT." was the first song with at least 200 million streams globally in multiple weeks on both charts. "Die with a Smile" and "APT." spent 18 and 12 weeks at number one on the Global 200, respectively. "APT." also spent a record breaking 19 weeks on the top of the Global Excluding United States chart, while "Die with a Smile" spent 17 weeks atop the same chart. In April 2026, Mars received the key to the Las Vegas Strip, while Park Avenue outside Park MGM was renamed to Bruno Mars Drive.

== Personal life ==
=== Family and relationships ===
Mars's brother Eric Hernandez is the drummer for his backup band, The Hooligans. Their sisters Tiara, Tahiti and Presley and their cousin, Jamie, make up the all-girl Lylas. When she was young, Jamie moved in with the siblings due to parental issues. Mars began dating model Jessica Caban in 2011. The couple lived in a mansion in the Hollywood Hills with a Rottweiler named Geronimo. In January 2025, Caban confirmed their split.

On May 31, 2013, Mars was returning to Los Angeles from overseas when he learned at the airport that his mother was gravely ill; he immediately got on a plane to Hawaii. His mother died at Queens Medical Center in Honolulu the following day at age 55 from complications of a brain aneurysm. On June 7, 2013, the singer wrote about the loss of his mother on Twitter: "So thankful for all the love during the most difficult time in my life. I'll be back on my feet again soon. That's what mom wants, she told me."

On November 19, 2026, Mars announced that his father had died the previous week, at the age of 74.

=== Race ===
In 2013, Mars told Rolling Stone that record executives "had trouble categorizing him" and were unsure which radio stations would play his songs or to which audience (Black or White) he would appeal. That May, he said that "Nothin' on You" was rejected by a "music industry decision-maker" because of his race. The experience made him feel like a "mutant", and he said that was his lowest point: "Even with that song in my back pocket to seal the deal, things like that are coming out of people's mouths. It made me feel like I wasn't even in the room."

In 2018, Mars was accused of cultural appropriation on social media for using his racial ambiguity to profit from black music and was criticized for mimicking the sound of past artists. Black celebrities, including Stevie Wonder, Charlie Wilson, 9th Wonder, Marjua Estevez, and Stereo Williams, dismissed the accusations. Mars has often spoken about his influences and has credited several Black artists, including Babyface, Teddy Riley, and Jimmy Jam and Terry Lewis. During a 2021 interview on The Breakfast Club, Mars responded to the criticism: "The only reason why I'm here is because of James Brown, is because of Prince, Michael [Jackson] ...This music comes from love and if you can't hear that, then I don't know what to tell you."

In 2025, Mars was accused, a second time, of cultural appropriation due to "Bonde do Brunão". In 2026, Daye affirmed the sound that he and producer D'Mile pioneered, the style, and a list of collaborators have been used by Mars to "another level". Daye feels that Mars has yet to recognize him as an inspiration.

=== Legal issues ===
Mars was arrested on the Las Vegas Strip at the Hard Rock Casino for possession of cocaine on September 19, 2010, and pled guilty to felony drug possession. He was fined $2,000, sentenced to 200 hours of community service, given 12 months of probation, and required to receive eight hours of drug counseling. In January 2012, his cocaine-possession charges were dismissed after his attorneys informed a state court judge that he had completed community service and met the conditions of a plea deal reached a year earlier.

Demetrius Proctor filed a lawsuit on January 28, 2014, saying he held the copyright for the McCoy and Mars's "Billionaire". Proctor alleged that he owned the copyright to the song's music and lyrics since March 31, 2011, although the song was released a year before. As evidence, he submitted a United States Copyright Office registration certificate issued in 2000 for "Frisky Vol. 1 to 30 (Tapes)". Proctor accused the defendants of "willful and intentional" copyright infringement, sought the destruction of all copies of the recording, and claimed exclusive rights to reproduce and distribute the song. On November 5, 2020, the case was dismissed.

"Uptown Funk" by Ronson and Mars has been cited for copyright infringement. In 2015, similarities to "Oops Up Side Your Head" (1979) by the Gap Band led them, keyboardist Rudolph Taylor and producer Lonnie Simmons to be added as co-writers of "Uptown Funk" and receive publishing royalties. In the same year, Serbian singer Viktorija said "Uptown Funk" infringed on one of her tracks, but decided not to sue Mars and Ronson. In 2016, Electro-funk band Collage sued Ronson and Mars for copying their 1983 single, "Young Girls"; the Sequence, a rap group, said that it infringed their 1979 single "Funk You Up" and sued a year later. In 2017, Lastrada Entertainment filed a lawsuit due to similarities with "More Bounce to the Ounce" (1980) by Zapp. The company sought damages and a jury trial to prevent Ronson from profiting from "Uptown Funk". The three lawsuits were dropped or settled. "Treasure" was re-registered, with writing credits including Thibaut Berland and Christopher Khan, due to similarities to Breakbot's "Baby I'm Yours".

=== Wealth ===
Billboard estimated Mars's 2013 earnings at $18,839,681, making him the year's twelfth-highest-paid musician. Forbes began reporting his earnings in 2014, calculating that the $60 million earned between June 2013 and June 2014 for his music and tour placed him thirteenth on the magazine's Celebrity 100 list. Mars was sixth on the magazine's World's Highest Paid Celebrities list in 2017, earning an estimated $39 million from June 2016 through June 2017. Forbes announced that Mars was America's highest-paid musician in 2017, with an estimated total of $100 million; this placed him eleventh on the Celebrity 100 list and were his highest yearly earnings to date. He was 54th on the 2019 Forbes Celebrity 100 list, with estimated earnings of $51.5 million between June 1, 2018, and June 1, 2019.

Mars was reportedly $50 million in debt in March 2024 due to gambling losses, possibly explaining his nine-year Vegas residency at Park MGM. MGM Resorts denied the allegations on March 18, with senior vice president of public relations Jenn Michaels saying that he "has no debt with MGM ... speculation otherwise is completely false." Mars has since poked fun at the rumor.

== Discography ==
Solo studio albums

- Doo-Wops & Hooligans (2010)
- Unorthodox Jukebox (2012)
- 24K Magic (2016)
- The Romantic (2026)

Collaborative studio albums

- An Evening with Silk Sonic (with Anderson .Paak, as Silk Sonic) (2021)

== Filmography ==
- Honeymoon in Vegas (1992)
- Rio 2 (2014)

== Tours and residencies ==
=== Concert tours ===
Headlining

- The Doo-Wops & Hooligans Tour (2010–2012)
- Moonshine Jungle Tour (2013–2014)
- 24K Magic World Tour (2017–2018)
- Bruno Mars Live (2022–2024)
- The Romantic Tour (2026–2027)

Co-headlining

- European tour with Travie McCoy (2010) (European select dates)
- Hooligans in Wondaland Tour with Janelle Monáe (2011)

Opening act

- Palm Trees & Power Lines Tour (Maroon 5) (2010) (North American select dates)

=== Concert residencies ===
Headlining

- Bruno Mars at The Chelsea, Las Vegas (2013–2015)
- Bruno Mars at Park MGM (2016–2025)

Co-headlining

- An Evening with Silk Sonic at Park MGM (2022)

== See also ==
- List of best-selling singles in the United States
- List of Billboard Hot 100 chart achievements and milestones
- List of highest-certified music artists in the United States
- List of highest-grossing concert tours
- List of most-followed Twitter accounts
