= List of awards and nominations received by Bruno Mars =

Bruno Mars awards and nominations
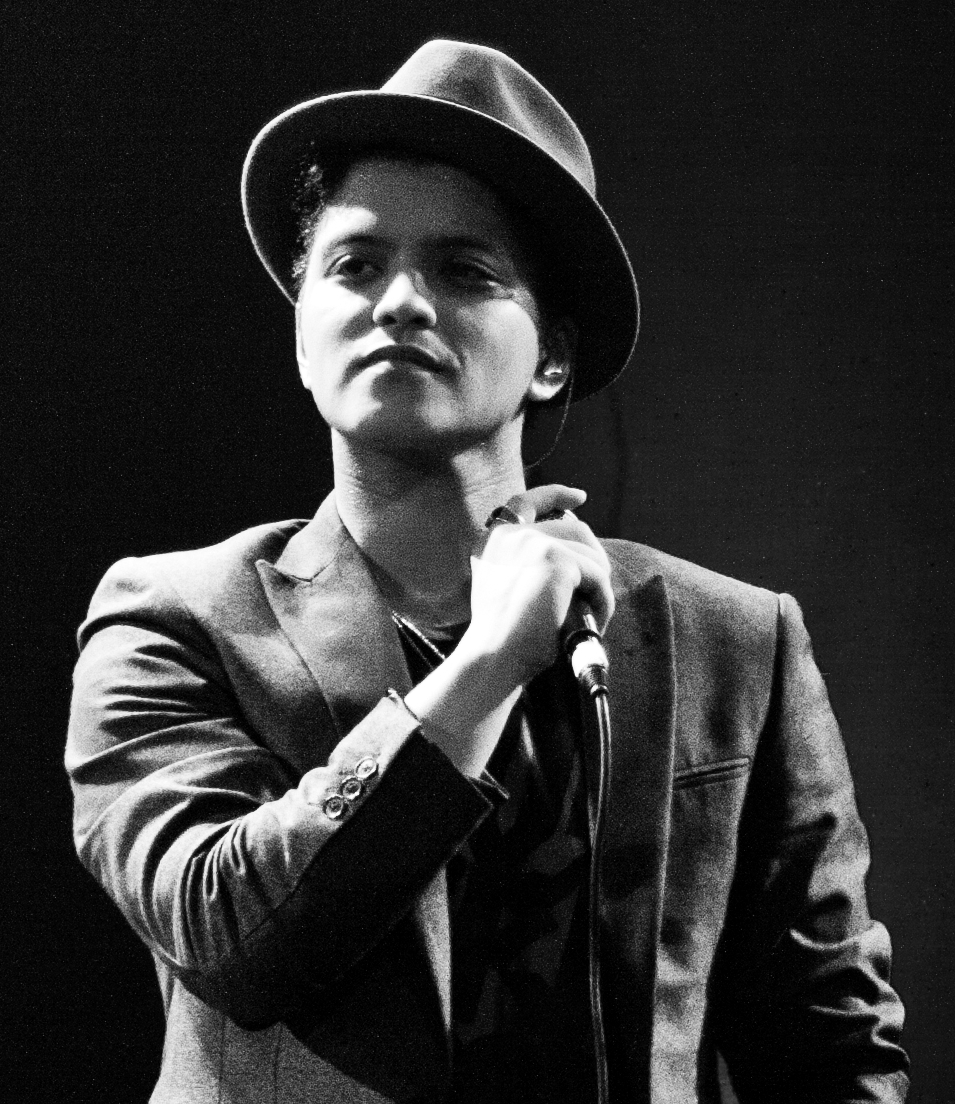
- Mars performing in Houston, Texas on 24 November 2011.
Awards and nominations
Award	Wins	Nominations
Daytime Emmy Awards	0	1
Primetime Emmy Awards	0	2
Grammy Awards	16	42

Totals (Note: Certain award groups do not simply award one winner. They acknowledge several different recipients, have runners-up, and have third place. Since this is a specific recognition and is different from losing an award, runner-up mentions are considered wins in this award tally. For simplification and to avoid errors, each award in this list has been presumed to have had a prior nomination.)
- Wins: 222
- Nominations: 586

The American singer-songwriter Bruno Mars has received numerous industry awards and honorary accolades. He is one of the most-awarded artists of the American Music Awards (17) and he is one of two artists to have the most Record of the Year wins at the Grammy Awards (3). He has also received several nominations at the American Music Awards (35), Billboard Music Awards (55), Grammy Awards (42), MTV Video Music Awards (44), NAACP Image Awards (26), Soul Train Music Awards (31) and Teen Choice Awards (31). Mars was included in the Forbes Celebrity 100 list five times (2014, 2015, 2017, 2018 and 2019), music callout as the Forbes 30 Under 30 Music's Brightest Young Stars (2014) and was included in the Time 100 most influential people list once (2011). As of February 2026, Mars had registered ten Guinness World Records.

Mars started as a composer for other artists along with his production team the Smeezingtons. The team was nominated twice for Producer of the Year, Non-Classical at the Grammy Awards 53rd Annual Grammy Awards and at the 54th Annual Grammy Awards. They were responsible for Mars's first collaboration with B.o.B, the single "Nothin' on You", which won Song of the Year at the 2010 Soul Train Music Awards, and at the 53rd Annual Grammy Awards it was nominated in three categories, including Record of the Year. Mars's debut solo single, "Just the Way You Are", won Best Male Pop Vocal Performance at the same ceremony. His debut studio album, Doo-Wops & Hooligans (2010) was nominated for Album of the Year at the 54th Annual Grammy Awards, while "Grenade" was nominated for Record of the Year and Song of the Year.

Mars's second studio album, Unorthodox Jukebox (2012) earned the singer four nominations at the 56th Annual Grammy Awards, with two of its singles, "Locked Out of Heaven", and "When I Was Your Man", being nominated for Record of the Year and Best Pop Solo Performance, respectively. The album won Best Pop Vocal Album at the ceremony and was also recognized with a Juno Award. In 2014, Mars collaborated on Mark Ronson's single "Uptown Funk". The song won the Brit Award for Single of the Year, Song of the Year at the Soul Train Music Awards, International Work of the Year at the APRA Music Awards and two Grammy awards – Record of the Year and Best Pop Duo/Group Performance. In 2016 Mars received NRJ Artist of Honor at the NRJ Music Awards and received a Grammy Award for Album of the Year at the 59th Annual Grammy Awards for his work on Adele's third studio album, 25 (2015).

In 2017, Mars earned Innovator Award at the iHeartRadio Music Awards and Visionary Award at the Teen Choice Awards. Mars's third studio album, 24K Magic (2016), earned him seven awards at the 2017 American Music Awards, including Artist of the Year, two for his single "That's What I Like" and other two for his album 24K Magic. In 2018, the album won Grammy Awards for Album of the Year and Best R&B Album, the single "24K Magic" received Record of the Year, while "That's What I Like" earned Song of the Year, Best R&B Performance and Best R&B Song. The album was supported by the 24K Magic World Tour, which was awarded Top R&B Tour by the Billboard Music Awards Tour and Tour/Event Sound Production by the TEC Awards.

In 2021, Mars released a collaborative album with Anderson .Paak, as Silk Sonic, titled An Evening with Silk Sonic. The album won R&B Album of the Year and Album of the Year at the 2022 iHeartRadio Music Awards and at the BET Awards 2022, respectively. Its single, "Leave the Door Open" won Song of the Year at the 2021 Soul Train Music Awards, as well as Record of the Year, Song of the Year, Best R&B Performance and Best R&B Song at the 2022 Grammy Awards. The duo won Best Group at the BET Awards 2021 and 2022, International Group of the Year at the 2022 Brit Awards and Best Duo/Group of the Year at the 2022 iHeartRadio Music Awards. Mars's collaboration with Lady Gaga, "Die With a Smile", won Best Pop Duo/Group Performance and was nominated for Song of the Year at the 2025 Grammy Awards. The song also won Favorite Music Video and Collaboration of the Year at the American Music Awards of 2025 and Best Collaboration at the 2025 MTV Video Music Awards. Mars's collaboration with Rosé, "APT.", was nominated for Record of the Year, Song of the Year, and Best Pop Duo/Group Performance at the 2026 Grammy Awards. "APT." won Song of the Year at the 9th Asia Artist Awards, 2025 MAMA Awards, and 2025 MTV Video Music Awards.

== Major associations ==
=== Emmy Awards ===
Year	Nominee / work	Category	Result	Ref.
Primetime Emmy Awards
2014	Super Bowl XLVIII: Halftime Show Starring Bruno Mars	Outstanding Short-Format Live-Action Entertainment Program	Nominated	
2018	Bruno Mars: 24K Magic Live at the Apollo	Outstanding Music Direction	Nominated	
Daytime Emmy Awards
2016	Mark Ronson and Bruno Mars in The Ellen DeGeneres Show	Outstanding Musical Performance in a Talk Show/Morning Program	Nominated	

=== Grammy Awards ===
Year	Nominee / work	Category	Result	Ref.
2011	"Nothin' on You"	Record of the Year	Nominated	
2011	"Nothin' on You"	Best Rap/Sung Collaboration	Nominated	
2011	"Nothin' on You"	Best Rap Song	Nominated	
2011	"Fuck You"	Record of the Year (Note: As a producer.)	Nominated	
2011	"Fuck You"	Song of the Year (Note: As a songwriter.)	Nominated	
2011	"Just the Way You Are"	Best Male Pop Vocal Performance	Won	
2011	The Smeezingtons	Producer of the Year, Non-Classical	Nominated	
2012	Doo-Wops & Hooligans	Album of the Year	Nominated	
2012	Doo-Wops & Hooligans	Best Pop Vocal Album	Nominated	
2012	"Grenade"	Record of the Year	Nominated	
2012	"Grenade"	Song of the Year	Nominated	
2012	"Grenade"	Best Pop Solo Performance	Nominated	
2012	The Smeezingtons	Producer of the Year, Non-Classical	Nominated	
2013	"Young, Wild & Free"	Best Rap Song	Nominated	
2014	Unorthodox Jukebox	Best Pop Vocal Album	Won	
2014	"Locked Out of Heaven"	Record of the Year	Nominated	
2014	"Locked Out of Heaven"	Song of the Year	Nominated	
2014	"When I Was Your Man"	Best Pop Solo Performance	Nominated	
2016	"Uptown Funk"	Record of the Year	Won	
2016	"Uptown Funk"	Best Pop Duo/Group Performance	Won	
2017	25	Album of the Year	Won	
2018	24K Magic	Album of the Year	Won	
2018	24K Magic	Best R&B Album	Won	
2018	"24K Magic"	Record of the Year	Won	
2018	"That's What I Like"	Song of the Year	Won	
2018	"That's What I Like"	Best R&B Performance	Won	
2018	"That's What I Like"	Best R&B Song	Won	
2022	"Leave the Door Open" (with Anderson .Paak as Silk Sonic)	Record of the Year	Won	
2022	"Leave the Door Open" (with Anderson .Paak as Silk Sonic)	Song of the Year	Won	
2022	"Leave the Door Open" (with Anderson .Paak as Silk Sonic)	Best R&B Performance	Won (Note: Tied with Jazmine Sullivan for "Pick Up Your Feelings" (2020).)	
2022	"Leave the Door Open" (with Anderson .Paak as Silk Sonic)	Best R&B Song	Won	
2025	"Die with a Smile" (with Lady Gaga)	Song of the Year	Nominated	
2025	"Die with a Smile" (with Lady Gaga)	Best Pop Duo/Group Performance	Won	
2026	"APT." (with Rosé)	Record of the Year	Nominated	
2026	"APT." (with Rosé)	Song of the Year	Nominated	
2026	"APT." (with Rosé)	Best Pop Duo/Group Performance	Nominated	
2027	The Romantic	Album of the Year	Pending	
2027	The Romantic	Best Pop Vocal Album	Pending	
2027	"I Just Might"	Record of the Year	Pending	
2027	"Risk It All"	Song of the Year	Pending	
2027	"Risk It All"	Best Pop Solo Performance	Pending	
2027	"Runway"	Best Song Written for Visual Media	Pending	

== Miscellaneous awards ==
Key
†	Indicates non-competitive categories

Name of the award ceremony, year presented, nominee(s) of the award, category, and the result of the nomination
Award	Year (Note: Indicates the year of ceremony. Each year is linked to the article about the awards held that year, wherever possible.)	Nominee / work	Category	Result	Ref.
AFRIMA Awards	2025	Lady Gaga and Bruno Mars	Best Global Act	Pending	
ALMA Award	2011	Bruno Mars	Favorite Male Music Artist	Nominated	
ALMA Award	2012	Bruno Mars	Favorite Male Music Artist	Nominated	
American Music Awards	2011	Bruno Mars	Favorite Pop/Rock Male Artist	Won	
American Music Awards	2011	Bruno Mars	Favorite Adult Contemporary Artist	Nominated	
American Music Awards	2013	Bruno Mars	Artist of the Year	Nominated	
American Music Awards	2013	Bruno Mars	Favorite Pop/Rock Male Artist	Nominated	
American Music Awards	2013	Bruno Mars	Favorite Adult Contemporary Artist	Nominated	
American Music Awards	2015	"Uptown Funk" (with Mark Ronson)	Single of the Year	Nominated	
American Music Awards	2015	"Uptown Funk" (with Mark Ronson)	Collaboration of the Year	Nominated	
American Music Awards	2017	Bruno Mars	Artist of the Year	Won	
American Music Awards	2017	Bruno Mars	Favorite Pop/Rock Male Artist	Won	
American Music Awards	2017	Bruno Mars	Favorite Soul/R&B Male Artist	Won	
American Music Awards	2017	Bruno Mars	Favorite Adult Contemporary Artist	Nominated	
American Music Awards	2017	24K Magic	Favorite Pop/Rock Album	Won	
American Music Awards	2017	24K Magic	Favorite Soul/R&B Album	Won	
American Music Awards	2017	"That's What I Like"	Favorite Soul/R&B Song	Won	
American Music Awards	2017	"That's What I Like"	Video of the Year	Won	
American Music Awards	2018	Bruno Mars	Favorite Male Artist Soul/R&B	Nominated	
American Music Awards	2018	24K Magic World Tour	Tour of the Year	Nominated	
American Music Awards	2018	"Finesse" (featuring Cardi B)	Collaboration of the Year	Nominated	
American Music Awards	2018	"Finesse" (featuring Cardi B)	Favorite Song – Soul/R&B	Won	
American Music Awards	2019	Bruno Mars	Favorite Male Artist Soul/R&B	Won	
American Music Awards	2021	Silk Sonic (Bruno Mars and Anderson .Paak)	Favorite Duo or Group	Nominated	
American Music Awards	2021	"Leave the Door Open" (with Anderson .Paak as Silk Sonic)	Video of the Year	Nominated	
American Music Awards	2021	"Leave the Door Open" (with Anderson .Paak as Silk Sonic)	Favorite Song – Soul/R&B	Won	
American Music Awards	2022	An Evening with Silk Sonic	Favorite Soul/R&B Album	Nominated	
American Music Awards	2022	"Smokin out the Window"	Favorite Song – Soul/R&B	Nominated	
American Music Awards	2025	Bruno Mars	Favorite Pop/Rock Male Artist	Won	
American Music Awards	2025	"Die with a Smile" (with Lady Gaga)	Song of the Year	Nominated	
American Music Awards	2025	"Die with a Smile" (with Lady Gaga)	Favorite Pop Song	Nominated	
American Music Awards	2025	"Die with a Smile" (with Lady Gaga)	Favorite Music Video	Won	
American Music Awards	2025	"Die with a Smile" (with Lady Gaga)	Collaboration of the Year	Won	
American Music Awards	2025	"APT." (with Rosé)	Collaboration of the Year	Nominated	
American Music Awards	2026	Bruno Mars	Artist Of The Year	Nominated	
American Music Awards	2026	Bruno Mars	Best Male R&B Artist Soul	Won	
American Music Awards	2026	"I Just Might"	Favorite Soul/R&B Song	Won	
American Music Awards	2026	The Romantic	Best R&B Album	Won	
APRA Music Awards	2016	"Uptown Funk" (with Mark Ronson)	International Work of the Year	Won	
APRA Music Awards	2018	"24K Magic"	International Work of the Year	Nominated	
APRA Music Awards	2026	"APT." (with Rosé)	Most Performed International Work	Nominated	
ARIA Music Awards	2012	Bruno Mars	Best International Artist	Nominated	
ARIA Music Awards	2013	Bruno Mars	Best International Artist	Nominated	
ARIA Music Awards	2017	Bruno Mars	Best International Artist	Nominated	
ASCAP Pop Music Awards	2011	"Billionaire" (with Travie McCoy)	Most Performed Songs	Won	
ASCAP Pop Music Awards	2011	"Nothin' on You" (with B.o.B)	Most Performed Songs	Won	
ASCAP Pop Music Awards	2011	"Just the Way You Are"	Most Performed Songs	Won	
ASCAP Pop Music Awards	2012	"Just the Way You Are"	Song of the Year	Won	
ASCAP Pop Music Awards	2012	"Just the Way You Are"	Most Performed Songs	Won	
ASCAP Pop Music Awards	2012	"Grenade"	Most Performed Songs	Won	
ASCAP Pop Music Awards	2012	"The Lazy Song"	Most Performed Songs	Won	
ASCAP Pop Music Awards	2012	"Lighters" (with Bad Meets Evil)	Most Performed Songs	Won	
ASCAP Pop Music Awards	2013	"It Will Rain"	Most Performed Songs	Won	
ASCAP Pop Music Awards	2013	"Young, Wild & Free" (with Wiz Khalifa & Snoop Dogg)	Most Performed Songs	Won	
ASCAP Pop Music Awards	2014	"Locked Out of Heaven"	Most Performed Songs	Won	
ASCAP Pop Music Awards	2014	"When I Was Your Man"	Most Performed Songs	Won	
ASCAP Pop Music Awards	2014	"Treasure"	Most Performed Songs	Won	
ASCAP Rhythm & Soul Music Awards	2011	"Nothin' on You" (with B.o.B)	Top Rap Song	Won	
Asia Artist Awards	2024	"APT." (with Rosé)	Song of the Year (Daesang)	Won	
Asian Pop Music Awards	2024	"APT." (with Rosé)	Best Collaboration (Overseas)	Won	
Asian Pop Music Awards	2024	"APT." (with Rosé)	Top 20 Songs of the Year (Overseas)	Won	
Asian Pop Music Awards	2024	"APT." (with Rosé)	Song of the Year (Overseas)	Nominated	
Asian Pop Music Awards	2025	"Number One Girl"	Best Composer	Nominated	
BBC Music Awards	2015	Uptown Funk (with Mark Ronson)	Song of the Year	Nominated	
BET Awards	2010	"Nothin' on You" (with B.o.B)	Best Collaboration	Nominated	
BET Awards	2010	"Nothin' on You" (with B.o.B)	Video of the Year	Nominated	
BET Awards	2011	Bruno Mars	Best New Artist	Nominated	
BET Awards	2011	Bruno Mars	Best Male R&B Artist	Nominated	
BET Awards	2012	Bruno Mars	Best Male R&B Artist	Nominated	
BET Awards	2013	Bruno Mars	Best Male R&B Artist	Nominated	
BET Awards	2015	"Uptown Funk" (with Mark Ronson)	Best Collaboration	Nominated	
BET Awards	2015	"Uptown Funk" (with Mark Ronson)	Centric Award	Nominated	
BET Awards	2017	24K Magic	Album of the Year	Nominated	
BET Awards	2017	Bruno Mars	Best Male R&B/Pop Artist	Won	
BET Awards	2017	Bruno Mars & Jonathan Lia	Video Director of the Year	Nominated	
BET Awards	2017	"24K Magic"	Video of the Year	Won	
BET Awards	2017	"24K Magic"	Coca-Cola Viewers' Choice	Nominated	
BET Awards	2018	Bruno Mars	Best Male R&B/Pop Artist	Won	
BET Awards	2018	"Finesse (Remix)" (featuring Cardi B)	Best Collaboration	Nominated	
BET Awards	2018	"Finesse (Remix)" (featuring Cardi B)	Video of the Year	Nominated	
BET Awards	2019	Bruno Mars	Best Male R&B/Pop Artist	Won	
BET Awards	2019	"Please Me" (with Cardi B)	Best Collaboration	Nominated	
BET Awards	2019	"Please Me" (with Cardi B)	Video of the Year	Nominated	
BET Awards	2021	Silk Sonic (Bruno Mars and Anderson .Paak)	Best Group	Won	
BET Awards	2021	"Leave the Door Open" (with Anderson .Paak as Silk Sonic)	Coca-Cola Viewers' Choice	Nominated	
BET Awards	2021	"Leave the Door Open" (with Anderson .Paak as Silk Sonic)	Video of the Year	Nominated	
BET Awards	2021	Bruno Mars, Florent Dechard	Video Director of the Year	Won	
BET Awards	2022	An Evening with Silk Sonic (with Anderson .Paak as Silk Sonic)	Album of the Year	Won	
BET Awards	2022	Silk Sonic (Bruno Mars and Anderson .Paak)	Best Group	Won	
BET Awards	2022	"Smokin out the Window" (with Anderson .Paak as Silk Sonic)	Video of the Year	Won (Note: Tied with Baby Keem and Kendrick Lamar for "Family Ties" (2021).)	
BET Awards	2025	Bruno Mars	Best Male R&B/Pop Artist	Nominated	
BET Awards	2026	The Romantic	Album of the Year	Nominated	
BET Awards	2026	Bruno Mars	Best Male Pop/R&B Artist	Nominated	
BET Awards	2026	"I Just Might"	Viewers' Choice	Nominated	
BET Hip Hop Awards	2010	"Nothin' on You" (with B.o.B)	Best Hip Hop Video	Nominated	
BET Hip Hop Awards	2010	"Nothin' on You" (with B.o.B)	Reese's Perfect Combo Award	Nominated	
BET Hip Hop Awards	2010	"Nothin' on You" (with B.o.B)	Verizon People's Champ Award	Nominated	
BET Hip Hop Awards	2019	"Please Me" (with Cardi B)	Best Collabo, Duo or Group	Nominated	
BET Hip Hop Awards	2019	Bruno Mars, Florent Dechard	Video Director of the Year	Nominated	
Billboard Latin Music Awards	2014	Bruno Mars	Crossover Artist of the Year	Won	
Billboard Latin Music Awards	2025	Bruno Mars	Crossover Artist of the Year	Nominated	
Billboard Latin Music Awards	2026	Bruno Mars	Crossover Artist of the Year	Nominated	
Billboard Music Awards	2011	Bruno Mars	Top New Artist	Nominated	
Billboard Music Awards	2011	Bruno Mars	Top Hot 100 Artist	Nominated	
Billboard Music Awards	2011	Bruno Mars	Top Digital Songs Artist	Nominated	
Billboard Music Awards	2011	Bruno Mars	Top Male Artist	Nominated	
Billboard Music Awards	2011	Bruno Mars	Top Radio Songs Artist	Nominated	
Billboard Music Awards	2011	"Nothin' on You" (with B.o.B.)	Top Rap Song	Nominated	
Billboard Music Awards	2011	"Just the Way You Are"	Top Hot 100 Song	Nominated	
Billboard Music Awards	2011	"Just the Way You Are"	Top Digital Song	Nominated	
Billboard Music Awards	2011	"Just the Way You Are"	Top Streaming Song (Audio)	Nominated	
Billboard Music Awards	2011	"Just the Way You Are"	Top Pop Song	Nominated	
Billboard Music Awards	2011	"Just the Way You Are"	Top Radio Song	Won	
Billboard Music Awards	2012	Bruno Mars			
Billboard Music Awards	2012	Bruno Mars	Top Hot 100 Artist	Nominated	
Billboard Music Awards	2012	Bruno Mars	Top Male Artist	Nominated	
Billboard Music Awards	2012	Bruno Mars	Top Radio Songs Artist	Nominated	
Billboard Music Awards	2012	Bruno Mars	Top Streaming Artist	Nominated	
Billboard Music Awards	2012	Bruno Mars	Top Digital Songs Artist	Nominated	
Billboard Music Awards	2012	"The Lazy Song"	Top Streaming Song (Video)	Nominated	
Billboard Music Awards	2013	Bruno Mars	Top Male Artist	Nominated	
Billboard Music Awards	2013	Bruno Mars	Top Pop Artist	Nominated	
Billboard Music Awards	2013	"Locked Out of Heaven"	Top Radio Song	Nominated	
Billboard Music Awards	2013	"Locked Out of Heaven"	Top Pop Song	Nominated	
Billboard Music Awards	2014	Bruno Mars	Top Artist	Nominated	
Billboard Music Awards	2014	Bruno Mars	Top Male Artist	Nominated	
Billboard Music Awards	2014	Bruno Mars	Top Radio Songs Artist	Nominated	
Billboard Music Awards	2015	"Uptown Funk" (with Mark Ronson)	Top Digital Song	Nominated	
Billboard Music Awards	2016	"Uptown Funk" (with Mark Ronson)	Top Radio Song	Nominated	
Billboard Music Awards	2016	"Uptown Funk" (with Mark Ronson)	Top Streaming Song (Video)	Nominated	
Billboard Music Awards	2017	Bruno Mars	Top R&B Artist	Nominated	
Billboard Music Awards	2017	24K Magic	Top R&B Album	Nominated	
Billboard Music Awards	2017	"24K Magic"	Top R&B Song	Nominated	
Billboard Music Awards	2018	Bruno Mars	Top Artist	Nominated	
Billboard Music Awards	2018	Bruno Mars	Top Male Artist	Nominated	
Billboard Music Awards	2018	Bruno Mars	Top Hot 100 Artist	Nominated	
Billboard Music Awards	2018	Bruno Mars	Top Song Sales Artist	Nominated	
Billboard Music Awards	2018	Bruno Mars	Top Radio Songs Artist	Nominated	
Billboard Music Awards	2018	Bruno Mars	Top Touring Artist	Nominated	
Billboard Music Awards	2018	Bruno Mars	Top R&B Artist	Won	
Billboard Music Awards	2018	Bruno Mars	Top R&B Male Artist	Won	
Billboard Music Awards	2018	Bruno Mars	Top R&B Tour	Won	
Billboard Music Awards	2018	24K Magic	Top R&B Album	Won	
Billboard Music Awards	2018	"That's What I Like"	Top Hot 100 Song	Nominated	
Billboard Music Awards	2018	"That's What I Like"	Top Streaming Song (Video)	Nominated	
Billboard Music Awards	2018	"That's What I Like"	Top Radio Song	Nominated	
Billboard Music Awards	2018	"That's What I Like"	Top R&B Song	Won	
Billboard Music Awards	2018	"Finesse" (featuring Cardi B)	Top R&B Song	Nominated	
Billboard Music Awards	2019	Bruno Mars	Top Touring Artist	Nominated	
Billboard Music Awards	2019	Bruno Mars	Top R&B Tour	Nominated	
Billboard Music Awards	2022	Silk Sonic (Bruno Mars and Anderson .Paak)	Top Duo/Group	Nominated	
Billboard Music Awards	2022	Silk Sonic (Bruno Mars and Anderson .Paak)	Top R&B Artist	Nominated	
Billboard Music Awards	2022	"Leave the Door Open" (with Anderson .Paak as Silk Sonic)	Top R&B Song	Won	
Billboard Music Awards	2022	An Evening with Silk Sonic (with Anderson .Paak as Silk Sonic)	Top R&B Album	Nominated	
Billboard Music Awards	2022	Bruno Mars (Bruno Mars at Park MGM)	Top R&B Tour	Won	
Billboard Music Awards	2023	Bruno Mars	Top R&B Touring Artist	Nominated	
Billboard Music Awards	2024	Bruno Mars	Top R&B Touring Artist	Won	
Billboard Touring Conference and Awards	2013	Bruno Mars	Breakthrough	Nominated	
Billboard Touring Conference and Awards	2013	Bruno Mars	Eventful Fans' Choice	Nominated	
Billboard Touring Conference and Awards	2017	Bruno Mars, 24k Magic Tour Paint the World Gold Campaign	Concert Marketing/Promotion	Nominated	
Bravo Otto	2011	Bruno Mars	Super Singer Male	Silver	
Brit Awards	2011	Bruno Mars	International Breakthrough Act	Nominated	
Brit Awards	2012	Bruno Mars	International Male Solo Artist	Won	
Brit Awards	2014	Bruno Mars	International Male Solo Artist	Won	
Brit Awards	2015	"Uptown Funk" (with Mark Ronson)	British Single of the Year	Won	
Brit Awards	2015	"Uptown Funk" (with Mark Ronson)	British Video of the Year	Nominated	
Brit Awards	2017	Bruno Mars	International Male Solo Artist	Nominated	
Brit Awards	2022	Silk Sonic (Bruno Mars and Anderson .Paak)	International Group of the Year	Won	
Brit Awards	2026	"APT." (with Rosé)	International Song of the Year	Won	
Brit Awards	2026	"Die with a Smile" (with Lady Gaga)	International Song of the Year	Nominated	
BT Digital Music Awards	2011	Bruno Mars	Best International Artist	Won	
Channel V Thailand Music Video Awards	2011	"Just the Way You Are"	Popular International Music Video	Won	
Channel V Thailand Music Video Awards	2011	Bruno Mars	Popular International New Artist	Won	
Channel V Thailand Music Video Awards	2011	Bruno Mars	Popular International Male Artist	Won	
Echo Awards	2011	Bruno Mars	Best International Newcomer	Nominated	
Echo Awards	2012	Bruno Mars	Best International Male	Won	
Hungarian Music Awards	2013	Unorthodox Jukebox	Contemporary Pop-Rock Album of the Year	Won	
Hungarian Music Awards	2017	24K Magic	Modern Pop-Rock Album/Voice Recording of the Year	Won	
Hungarian Music Awards	2022	An Evening with Silk Sonic (with Anderson .Paak as Silk Sonic)	Modern Pop-Rock Album/Voice Recording of the Year	Won	
Hungarian Music Awards	2025	"Die with a Smile"	Foreign Record of the Year	Nominated	
GAFFA Awards (Denmark)	2011	Bruno Mars	International Male Artist of the Year	Won	
GAFFA Awards (Denmark)	2011	Bruno Mars	International New Artist of the Year	Won	
GAFFA Awards (Denmark)	2011	Doo-Wops & Hooligans	International Album of the Year	Nominated	
GAFFA Awards (Denmark)	2011	"Liquor Store Blues"	International Video of the Year	Nominated	
GAFFA Awards (Denmark)	2015	"Uptown Funk"	International Hit of the Year	Nominated	
GAFFA Awards (Denmark)	2017	"24K Magic"	International Hit of the Year	Nominated	
GAFFA Awards (Denmark)	2017	Bruno Mars	International Male Artist of the Year	Nominated	
GAFFA Awards (Denmark)	2017	24K Magic	International Album of the Year	Won	
GAFFA Awards (Denmark)	2019	"Finesse" (featuring Cardi B)	International Hit of the Year	Nominated	
Hollywood Walk of Fame	2016	Bruno Mars	Recording	Won	
iHeartRadio Music Awards	2016	"Uptown Funk" (with Mark Ronson)	Song of the Year	Nominated	
iHeartRadio Music Awards	2016	"Uptown Funk" (with Mark Ronson)	Best Collaboration	Won	
iHeartRadio Music Awards	2017	"All I Ask"	Best Cover Song	Nominated	
iHeartRadio Music Awards	2017	Bruno Mars	Innovator Award †	Won	
iHeartRadio Music Awards	2018	"That's What I Like"	Song of the Year	Nominated	
iHeartRadio Music Awards	2018	"That's What I Like"	R&B Song of the Year	Won	
iHeartRadio Music Awards	2018	"That's What I Like"	Best Music Video	Nominated	
iHeartRadio Music Awards	2018	Bruno Mars	Male Artist of the Year	Nominated	
iHeartRadio Music Awards	2018	Bruno Mars	R&B Artist of the Year	Won	
iHeartRadio Music Awards	2018	Bruno Mars	Most Thumbed Up Artist of the Year	Won	
iHeartRadio Music Awards	2019	"Finesse" (featuring Cardi B)	Best Collaboration	Won	
iHeartRadio Music Awards	2019	"Finesse" (featuring Cardi B)	R&B Song of the Year	Nominated	
iHeartRadio Music Awards	2019	"Finesse" (featuring Cardi B)	Best Music Video	Nominated	
iHeartRadio Music Awards	2022	"Leave the Door Open" (with Anderson .Paak as Silk Sonic)	Song of the Year	Nominated	
iHeartRadio Music Awards	2022	"Leave the Door Open" (with Anderson .Paak as Silk Sonic)	R&B Song of the Year	Won	
iHeartRadio Music Awards	2022	"Leave the Door Open" (with Anderson .Paak as Silk Sonic)	Best Lyrics	Nominated	
iHeartRadio Music Awards	2022	"Leave the Door Open" (with Anderson .Paak as Silk Sonic)	Best Music Video	Nominated	
iHeartRadio Music Awards	2022	Silk Sonic (Bruno Mars and Anderson .Paak)	Best Duo/Group of the Year	Won	
iHeartRadio Music Awards	2022	Silk Sonic (Bruno Mars and Anderson .Paak)	R&B Artist of the Year	Nominated	
iHeartRadio Music Awards	2022	An Evening with Silk Sonic (with Anderson .Paak as Silk Sonic)	R&B Album of the Year	Won	
iHeartRadio Music Awards	2023	Silk Sonic	Best Duo/Group of the Year	Nominated	
iHeartRadio Music Awards	2023	Silk Sonic	R&B Artist of the Year	Nominated	
iHeartRadio Music Awards	2023	"Smokin out the Window"	R&B Song of the Year	Nominated	
iHeartRadio Music Awards	2023	An Evening with Silk Sonic	Favorite Residency	Nominated	
iHeartRadio Music Awards	2025	"APT." (with Rosé)	Best Music Video	Nominated	
iHeartRadio Music Awards	2025	"Die with a Smile" (with Lady Gaga)	Best Music Video	Nominated	
iHeartRadio Music Awards	2025	"Die with a Smile" (with Lady Gaga)	Best Collaboration	Won	
iHeartRadio Music Awards	2026	"APT." (with Rosé)	Best Collaboration	Won	
iHeartRadio Music Awards	2026	"APT." (with Rosé)	K-pop Song of the Year	Nominated	
iHeartRadio Music Awards	2026	"I Just Might"	Song of the Summer	Won	
iHeartRadio Titanium Awards	2018	"That's What I Like"	1 Billion Total Audience Spins on iHeartRadio Stations	Won	
iHeartRadio Titanium Awards	2019	"Finesse" (featuring Cardi B)	1 Billion Total Audience Spins on iHeartRadio Stations	Won	
Japan Gold Disc Awards	2012	Bruno Mars	Best 3 New Artists (Western)	Won	
Japan Gold Disc Awards	2025	"APT." (with Rosé)	Song of the Year by Streaming (Western)	Won	
Joox Thailand Music Awards	2018	Bruno Mars	International Artist of the Year	Nominated	
Joox Thailand Music Awards	2022	"Leave the Door Open" (with Anderson .Paak as Silk Sonic)	International Song of the Year	Won	
Juno Awards	2014	Unorthodox Jukebox	International Album of the Year	Won	
Juno Awards	2018	24K Magic	International Album of the Year	Nominated	
Korean Music Awards	2025	"APT." (with Rosé)	Best K-Pop Song	Nominated	
Korean Music Awards	2025	"APT." (with Rosé)	Song of the Year	Nominated	
LOS40 Music Awards	2011	Bruno Mars	Best International Artist	Nominated	
LOS40 Music Awards	2013	Bruno Mars	Best International Artist	Won	
LOS40 Music Awards	2013	"Locked Out of Heaven"	Best International Song	Nominated	
LOS40 Music Awards	2013	"Locked Out of Heaven"	Best International Video (Jury)	Nominated	
LOS40 Music Awards	2015	"Uptown Funk" (with Mark Ronson)	Best International Song	Nominated	
LOS40 Music Awards	2017	Bruno Mars	Best International Artist	Nominated	
LOS40 Music Awards	2017	24K Magic	Best International Album	Nominated	
LOS40 Music Awards	2017	"That's What I Like"	Best International Video (Jury)	Nominated	
LOS40 Music Awards	2017	24K Magic World Tour	Tour of the Year	Nominated	
LOS40 Music Awards	2018	Bruno Mars	Best International Artist	Nominated	
LOS40 Music Awards	2026	The Romantic Tour	Best International Tour	Nominated	
LOS40 Music Awards	2026	The Romantic	Best International Album	Nominated	
Lunas del Auditorio	2015	Bruno Mars	Best Foreign Pop	Won	
Lunas del Auditorio	2018	Bruno Mars	Best Foreign Pop	Won	
Make-A-Wish Foundation	2015	Bruno Mars	Chris Greicius Celebrity Award	Won	
MAMA Awards	2024	Rosé and Bruno Mars	Global Sensation	Won	
MAMA Awards	2025	"APT." (with Rosé)	Best Collaboration	Won	
MAMA Awards	2025	"APT." (with Rosé)	Song of the Year	Won	
MelOn Music Awards	2013	"Young Girls"	Best Pop	Won	
MelOn Music Awards	2015	"Uptown Funk" (with Mark Ronson)	Best Pop	Won	
MelOn Music Awards	2026	Bruno Mars	Best Pop Artist	Won	
MOBO Awards	2011	Bruno Mars	Best International Act	Nominated	
MOBO Awards	2015	"Uptown Funk" (with Mark Ronson)	Best Song	Nominated	
MP3 Music Awards	2011	"The Lazy Song"	The BNC Award Best/New/Act	Nominated	
MTV Europe Music Awards	2011	"Grenade"	Best Song	Nominated	
MTV Europe Music Awards	2011	Bruno Mars	Best New Act	Won	
MTV Europe Music Awards	2011	Bruno Mars	Best Male	Nominated	
MTV Europe Music Awards	2011	Bruno Mars	Best Push	Won	
MTV Europe Music Awards	2011	Bruno Mars	Best North American Act	Nominated	
MTV Europe Music Awards	2013	"Locked Out of Heaven"	Best Song	Won	
MTV Europe Music Awards	2013	Bruno Mars	Best Male	Nominated	
MTV Europe Music Awards	2013	Bruno Mars	Best North American Act	Nominated	
MTV Europe Music Awards	2014	Bruno Mars	Best Live Act	Nominated	
MTV Europe Music Awards	2015	"Uptown Funk" (with Mark Ronson)	Best Song	Nominated	
MTV Europe Music Awards	2015	"Uptown Funk" (with Mark Ronson)	Best Collaboration	Nominated	
MTV Europe Music Awards	2017	Bruno Mars	Best US Act	Nominated	
MTV Europe Music Awards	2017	Bruno Mars	Best Live Act	Nominated	
MTV Europe Music Awards	2021	"Leave the Door Open" (with Anderson .Paak as Silk Sonic)	Best Collaboration	Nominated	
MTV Europe Music Awards	2021	Silk Sonic (Bruno Mars and Anderson .Paak)	Best Group	Nominated	
MTV Europe Music Awards	2024	"Die with a Smile" (with Lady Gaga)	Best Collaboration	Nominated	
MTV Millennial Awards	2013	"Locked Out of Heaven"	International Hit of the Year	Nominated	
MTV Millennial Awards	2015	"Uptown Funk" (with Mark Ronson)	International Hit of the Year	Nominated	
MTV Millennial Awards	2017	"24K Magic"	International Hit of the Year	Nominated	
MTV Millennial Awards	2018	"Finesse" (featuring Cardi B)	International Hit of the Year	Nominated	
MTV Millennial Awards	2021	"Leave the Door Open" (with Anderson .Paak as Silk Sonic)	International Hit of the Year	Nominated	
MTV Millennial Awards Brazil	2018	"Finesse" (featuring Cardi B)	International Hit of the Year	Nominated	
MTV Millennial Awards Brazil	2021	"Leave the Door Open" (with Anderson .Paak as Silk Sonic)	International Collaboration	Nominated	
MTV Video Music Awards	2011	"Grenade"	Video of the Year	Nominated	
MTV Video Music Awards	2011	"Grenade"	Best Pop Video	Nominated	
MTV Video Music Awards	2011	"Grenade"	Best Male Video	Nominated	
MTV Video Music Awards	2011	"The Lazy Song"	Best Choreography	Nominated	
MTV Video Music Awards	2013	"Locked Out of Heaven"	Video of the Year	Nominated	
MTV Video Music Awards	2013	"Locked Out of Heaven"	Best Pop Video	Nominated	
MTV Video Music Awards	2013	"Locked Out of Heaven"	Best Male Video	Won	
MTV Video Music Awards	2013	"Treasure"	Best Choreography	Won	
MTV Video Music Awards	2015	"Uptown Funk" (with Mark Ronson)	Best Male Video	Won	
MTV Video Music Awards	2015	"Uptown Funk" (with Mark Ronson)	Best Direction	Nominated	
MTV Video Music Awards	2017	"24K Magic"	Video of the Year	Nominated	
MTV Video Music Awards	2017	"24K Magic"	Best Direction	Nominated	
MTV Video Music Awards	2017	"24K Magic"	Best Art Direction	Nominated	
MTV Video Music Awards	2017	Bruno Mars	Artist of the Year	Nominated	
MTV Video Music Awards	2018	"Finesse" (featuring Cardi B)	Video of the Year	Nominated	
MTV Video Music Awards	2018	"Finesse" (featuring Cardi B)	Song of the Year	Nominated	
MTV Video Music Awards	2018	"Finesse" (featuring Cardi B)	Best Collaboration	Nominated	
MTV Video Music Awards	2018	"Finesse" (featuring Cardi B)	Best Choreography	Nominated	
MTV Video Music Awards	2018	"Finesse" (featuring Cardi B)	Best Editing	Nominated	
MTV Video Music Awards	2018	Bruno Mars	Artist of the Year	Nominated	
MTV Video Music Awards	2019	"Please Me" (with Cardi B)	Best Pop	Nominated	
MTV Video Music Awards	2021	"Leave the Door Open" (with Anderson .Paak as Silk Sonic)	Song of the Year	Nominated	
MTV Video Music Awards	2021	"Leave the Door Open" (with Anderson .Paak as Silk Sonic)	Best R&B	Won	
MTV Video Music Awards	2021	"Leave the Door Open" (with Anderson .Paak as Silk Sonic)	Best Editing	Won	
MTV Video Music Awards	2021	Silk Sonic (Bruno Mars and Anderson .Paak)	Group of the Year	Nominated	
MTV Video Music Awards	2022	Silk Sonic (Bruno Mars and Anderson .Paak)	Group of the Year	Nominated	
MTV Video Music Awards	2025	"Die with a Smile" (with Lady Gaga)	Video of the Year	Nominated	
MTV Video Music Awards	2025	"Die with a Smile" (with Lady Gaga)	Song of the Year	Nominated	
MTV Video Music Awards	2025	"Die with a Smile" (with Lady Gaga)	Best Collaboration	Won	
MTV Video Music Awards	2025	"Die with a Smile" (with Lady Gaga)	Best Pop	Nominated	
MTV Video Music Awards	2025	"APT." (with Rosé)	Video of the Year	Nominated	
MTV Video Music Awards	2025	"APT." (with Rosé)	Song of the Year	Won	
MTV Video Music Awards	2025	"APT." (with Rosé)	Best Collaboration	Nominated	
MTV Video Music Awards	2025	"APT." (with Rosé)	Best Pop	Nominated	
MTV Video Music Awards	2025	"APT." (with Rosé)	Best Direction	Nominated	
MTV Video Music Awards	2025	"APT." (with Rosé)	Best Art Direction	Nominated	
MTV Video Music Awards	2025	"APT." (with Rosé)	Best Visual Effects	Nominated	
MTV Video Music Awards	2026	Bruno Mars	Artist of the Year	Nominated	
MTV Video Music Awards	2026	The Romantic	Best Album	Nominated	
MTV Video Music Awards	2026	"I Just Might"	Video of the Year	Nominated	
MTV Video Music Awards	2026	"I Just Might"	Best R&B	Won	
MTV Video Music Awards	2026	"I Just Might"	Best Direction	Nominated	
MTV Video Music Awards	2026	"I Just Might"	Best Editing	Nominated	
MTV Video Music Awards	2026	"Risk It All"	Song of Summer	Nominated	
MTV Video Music Awards Japan	2011	"Just the Way You Are"	Best Male Video	Won	
MTV Video Music Awards Japan	2011	"Nothin' on You" (with B.o.B.)	Best New Artist Video	Nominated	
MTV Video Music Awards Japan	2012	"It Will Rain"	Best Male Video	Won	
MTV Video Music Awards Japan	2012	"It Will Rain"	Best Video from a Film	Nominated	
MTV Video Music Awards Japan	2013	"Locked Out of Heaven"	Video of the Year	Nominated	
MTV Video Music Awards Japan	2013	"Locked Out of Heaven"	Best Male Video	Nominated	
MTV Video Music Awards Japan	2013	"Locked Out of Heaven"	Best Karaokee! Song	Nominated	
MTV Video Music Awards Japan	2015	"Uptown Funk" (with Mark Ronson)	Best Male Video	Nominated	
MTV Video Music Awards Japan	2017	"That's What I Like"	Best Male Video	Won	
MTV Video Music Awards Japan	2025	"APT." (with Rosé)	Best Collaboration Video (International)	Won	
MTV Video Music Awards Japan	2025	"APT." (with Rosé)	Video of the Year	Nominated	
MuchMusic Video Awards	2011	"Just the Way You Are"	International Video of the Year – Artist	Nominated	
MuchMusic Video Awards	2011	"Just the Way You Are"	Most Watched Video of the Year	Nominated	
MuchMusic Video Awards	2011	"Just the Way You Are"	UR Fave International Video	Nominated	
MuchMusic Video Awards	2012	"Lighters" (with Bad Meets Evil)	International Video of the Year – Group	Nominated	
Musa Awards	2021	"Leave the Door Open" (with Anderson .Paak as Silk Sonic)	Canción Internacional Anglo	Nominated	
Musa Awards	2024	"Die with a Smile" (with Lady Gaga)	Canción Internacional Anglo Del Año	Won	
Musa Awards	2024	"Die with a Smile" (with Lady Gaga)	Colaboración Internacional Anglo Del Año	Won	
Music Awards Japan	2025	"APT." (with Rosé)	Best International Pop Song in Japan	Won	
Music Awards Japan	2025	"APT." (with Rosé)	Song of the Year	Nominated	
Music Awards Japan	2025	"APT." (with Rosé)	Best of Listeners' Choice: International Song	Nominated	
Music Awards Japan	2025	"Die with a Smile" (with Lady Gaga)	Best of Listeners' Choice: International Song	Nominated	
Music Awards Japan	2025	"Die with a Smile" (with Lady Gaga)	Best International Pop Song in Japan	Nominated	
Myx Music Awards	2011	"Just the Way You Are"	Favorite International Video	Won	
Myx Music Awards	2012	"The Lazy Song"	Favorite International Video	Nominated	
NAACP Image Awards	2011	Bruno Mars	Outstanding New Artist	Nominated	
NAACP Image Awards	2012	Bruno Mars	Outstanding Male Artist	Nominated	
NAACP Image Awards	2013	Bruno Mars	Outstanding Male Artist	Nominated	
NAACP Image Awards	2013	"Locked Out of Heaven"	Outstanding Music Video	Nominated	
NAACP Image Awards	2013	"Locked Out of Heaven"	Outstanding Song	Nominated	
NAACP Image Awards	2014	Bruno Mars	Outstanding Male Artist	Nominated	
NAACP Image Awards	2014	"Treasure"	Outstanding Music Video	Nominated	
NAACP Image Awards	2014	"Treasure"	Outstanding Song	Nominated	
NAACP Image Awards	2017	Bruno Mars	Outstanding Male Artist	Nominated	
NAACP Image Awards	2017	"24K Magic"	Outstanding Music Video	Nominated	
NAACP Image Awards	2017	"24K Magic"	Outstanding Song	Nominated	
NAACP Image Awards	2018	Bruno Mars	Entertainer of the Year	Nominated	
NAACP Image Awards	2018	Bruno Mars	Outstanding Male Artist	Won	
NAACP Image Awards	2018	"That's What I Like"	Outstanding Music Video	Won	
NAACP Image Awards	2018	"That's What I Like"	Outstanding Song, Traditional	Won	
NAACP Image Awards	2019	Bruno Mars: 24K Magic Live at the Apollo	Outstanding Variety Show – Series or Special	Nominated	
NAACP Image Awards	2019	Bruno Mars	Outstanding Male Artist	Won	
NAACP Image Awards	2019	"Finesse (Remix)" (feat. Cardi B)	Outstanding Duo, Group or Collaboration	Nominated	
NAACP Image Awards	2019	"Finesse (Remix)" (feat. Cardi B)	Outstanding Music Video/Visual Album	Nominated	
NAACP Image Awards	2019	"Finesse (Remix)" (feat. Cardi B)	Outstanding Song, Contemporary	Nominated	
NAACP Image Awards	2020	Bruno Mars	Outstanding Male Artist	Won	
NAACP Image Awards	2022	"Leave the Door Open" (with Anderson .Paak as Silk Sonic)	Outstanding Soul/R&B Song	Nominated	
NAACP Image Awards	2022	"Leave the Door Open" (with Anderson .Paak as Silk Sonic)	Outstanding Duo, Group or Collaboration, Traditional	Won	
NAACP Image Awards	2022	"Leave the Door Open" (with Anderson .Paak as Silk Sonic)	Outstanding Music Video/Visual Album	Nominated	
NAACP Image Awards	2022	An Evening with Silk Sonic (with Anderson .Paak as Silk Sonic)	Outstanding Album	Nominated	
NAACP Image Awards	2023	"Love's Train"	Outstanding Duo, Group or Collaboration, Traditional	Won	
NetEase Cloud Music Awards	2024	"APT." (with Rosé)	Hot Collaborative Single of the Year	Won	
NewNowNext Awards	2013	"When I Was Your Man"	That's My Jam	Nominated	
New Music Awards	2010	Bruno Mars	Top 40 Male Artist of the Year	Won	
New Music Awards	2011	Bruno Mars	Top 40 Male Artist of the Year	Won	
New Music Awards	2012	Bruno Mars	Top 40 Male Artist of the Year	Won	
New Music Awards	2013	Bruno Mars	Top 40 Male Artist of the Year	Won	
New Music Awards	2014	Bruno Mars	AC Male Artist of the Year	Won	
New Music Awards	2014	Bruno Mars	Top 40 Male Artist of the Year	Won	
New Music Awards	2015	Bruno Mars	Top 40 Male Artist of the Year	Won	
New Music Awards	2017	"24K Magic"	Top 40 Single of the Year	Won	
New Music Awards	2018	Bruno Mars	Top 40 Male Artist of the Year	Won	
New Music Awards	2022	Silk Sonic (Bruno Mars and Anderson .Paak)	Top40/CHR New Group of the Year	Won	
New Music Awards	2022	Silk Sonic (Bruno Mars and Anderson .Paak)	AC New Group of the Year	Won	
Nickelodeon Kids' Choice Awards	2011	Bruno Mars	Favorite Male Singer	Nominated	
Nickelodeon Kids' Choice Awards	2012	Bruno Mars	Favorite Male Singer	Nominated	
Nickelodeon Kids' Choice Awards	2013	Bruno Mars	Favorite Male Singer	Nominated	
Nickelodeon Kids' Choice Awards	2014	Bruno Mars	Favorite Male Singer	Nominated	
Nickelodeon Kids' Choice Awards	2015	Bruno Mars	Favorite Male Singer	Nominated	
Nickelodeon Kids' Choice Awards	2017	Bruno Mars	Favorite Male Singer	Nominated	
Nickelodeon Kids' Choice Awards	2017	Bruno Mars	Favorite Global Music Star	Nominated	
Nickelodeon Kids' Choice Awards	2017	"24K Magic"	Favorite Music Video	Nominated	
Nickelodeon Kids' Choice Awards	2017	"24K Magic"	Favorite Song	Nominated	
Nickelodeon Kids' Choice Awards	2018	Bruno Mars	Favorite Male Artist	Nominated	
Nickelodeon Kids' Choice Awards	2018	"That's What I Like"	Favorite Song	Nominated	
Nickelodeon Kids' Choice Awards	2019	Bruno Mars	Favorite Male Artist	Nominated	
Nickelodeon Kids' Choice Awards	2022	Bruno Mars	Favorite Male Artist	Nominated	
Nickelodeon Kids' Choice Awards	2025	Bruno Mars	Favorite Male Artist	Won	
Nickelodeon Kids' Choice Awards	2025	Bruno Mars	Favorite Global Music Star: North America	Nominated	
Nickelodeon Kids' Choice Awards	2025	"APT." (with Rosé)	Favorite Music Collaboration	Nominated	
Nickelodeon Kids' Choice Awards	2025	"Die with a Smile" (with Lady Gaga)	Favorite Music Collaboration	Nominated	
Nickelodeon Kids' Choice Awards	2026	Bruno Mars	Favorite Male Artist	Won	
Nickelodeon Kids' Choice Awards	2026	"I Just Might"	Favorite Song	Nominated	
Nickelodeon Kids' Choice Awards	2026	The Romantic	Favorite Album	Nominated	
Nickelodeon Australian Kids' Choice Awards	2011	Bruno Mars	Fave International Artist	Nominated	
NME Awards	2015	"Uptown Funk" (with Mark Ronson)	Dancefloor Filler	Nominated	
NRJ Music Awards	2011	"The Lazy Song"	International Song of the Year	Nominated	
NRJ Music Awards	2011	Bruno Mars	New International Artist of the Year	Nominated	
NRJ Music Awards	2012	Bruno Mars	International Male Artist of the Year	Won	
NRJ Music Awards	2013	Bruno Mars	International Male Artist of the Year	Won	
NRJ Music Awards	2013	"Treasure"	International Song of the Year	Nominated	
NRJ Music Awards	2016	Bruno Mars	NRJ Artist of Honor †	Won	
NRJ Music Awards	2017	Bruno Mars	International Male Artist of the Year	Nominated	
NRJ Music Awards	2021	Silk Sonic (Bruno Mars and Anderson .Paak)	International Duo/Group of the Year	Nominated	
NRJ Music Awards	2024	"Die With a Smile" (with Lady Gaga)	International Collaboration of the Year	Won	
NRJ Music Awards	2025	"APT." (with Rosé)	International Collaboration of the Year	Won	
NRJ Music Awards	2026	Bruno Mars	International Male Artist of the Year	Nominated	
NRJ Music Awards	2026	"I Just Might"	International Song of the Year	Nominated	
O Music Awards	2013	Bruno Mars	Must Follow Artist on Twitter	Nominated	
People's Choice Awards	2011	Bruno Mars	Favorite Breakout Artist	Nominated	
People's Choice Awards	2012	Bruno Mars	Favorite Male Artist	Won	
People's Choice Awards	2012	Bruno Mars	Favorite R&B Artist	Nominated	
People's Choice Awards	2013	Bruno Mars	Favorite R&B Artist	Nominated	
People's Choice Awards	2014	Bruno Mars	Favorite Male Artist	Nominated	
People's Choice Awards	2014	Bruno Mars	Favorite Pop Artist	Nominated	
People's Choice Awards	2014	"When I Was Your Man"	Favorite Song	Nominated	
People's Choice Awards	2018	Bruno Mars	Male Artist of 2018	Nominated	
People's Choice Awards	2021	"Leave the Door Open" (with Anderson .Paak as Silk Sonic)	The Collaboration Song of 2021	Nominated	
Philippine K-pop Awards	2024	"APT." (with Rosé)	Best Collaboration of the Year	Won	
Pollstar Awards	2011	Bruno Mars	Best New Touring Artist	Nominated	
Pollstar Awards	2013	Bruno Mars	Most Creative Stage Production	Nominated	
Pollstar Awards	2013	Bruno Mars	Major Tour of the Year	Nominated	
Pollstar Awards	2014	Bruno Mars	Major Tour of the Year	Nominated	
Pollstar Awards	2017	Bruno Mars	Major Tour of the Year	Nominated	
Pollstar Awards	2017	Bruno Mars	Pop Tour of the Year	Won	
Pollstar Awards	2017	Bruno Mars	Urban/R&B Tour of the Year	Won	
Pollstar Awards	2021	Bruno Mars	Pollstar Touring Artist of the Decade	Nominated	
Pollstar Awards	2021	Bruno Mars	Pop Touring Artist of the Decade	Nominated	
Pollstar Awards	2021	Bruno Mars	Hip-Hop/R&B Touring Artist of the Decade	Won	
Premios Juventud	2013	Bruno Mars	Favorite Hitmaker	Won	
Premios Juventud	2013	"When I Was Your Man"	Favorite Hit	Won	
Premios Juventud	2014	Bruno Mars	Favorite Hitmaker	Won	
Premios Juventud	2015	"Uptown Funk" (with Mark Ronson)	Favorite Hit	Nominated	
Premios Juventud	2016	Bruno Mars	Favorite Hitmaker	Nominated	
Premios Odeón	2026	"APT." (with Rosé)	Best International Song	Won	
Radio Disney Music Awards	2013	Bruno Mars	Best Male Artist	Nominated	
Radio Disney Music Awards	2017	Bruno Mars	Best Male Artist	Nominated	
Radio Disney Music Awards	2017	"24K Magic"	Best Song That Makes You Smile	Won	
Radio Disney Music Awards	2018	Bruno Mars	Best Artist	Nominated	
Rockbjörnen	2025	"Die with a Smile" (with Lady Gaga)	Foreign Song of the Year	Nominated	
Rockbjörnen	2025	"Apt" (with Rosé)	Foreign Song of the Year	Nominated	
RTHK International Pop Poll Awards	2011	Bruno Mars	Top Male Artist	Bronze	
RTHK International Pop Poll Awards	2011	"Just the Way You Are"	Top 10 Gold International Gold Songs	Won	
RTHK International Pop Poll Awards	2011	Bruno Mars	Top New Act	Gold	
RTHK International Pop Poll Awards	2012	Bruno Mars	Top Male Artist	Gold	
RTHK International Pop Poll Awards	2012	"The Lazy Song"	Top 10 Gold International Gold Songs	Won	
RTHK International Pop Poll Awards	2013	Bruno Mars	Top Male Artist	Gold	
RTHK International Pop Poll Awards	2013	"Locked Out of Heaven"	Top 10 Gold International Gold Songs	Won	
RTHK International Pop Poll Awards	2014	Bruno Mars	Top Male Artist	Gold	
RTHK International Pop Poll Awards	2014	"When I Was Your Man"	Top 10 Gold International Gold Songs	Won	
RTHK International Pop Poll Awards	2015	"Uptown Funk" (with Mark Ronson)	Top 10 Gold International Gold Songs	Won	
RTHK International Pop Poll Awards	2017	Bruno Mars	Top Male Artist	Won	
RTHK International Pop Poll Awards	2017	"24K Magic"	Top 10 Gold International Gold Songs	Won	
RTHK International Pop Poll Awards	2017	24K Magic	The Best Selling Album	Won	
RTHK International Pop Poll Awards	2018	Bruno Mars	Top Male Artist	Silver	
RTHK International Pop Poll Awards	2018	"That's What I Like"	Top 10 Gold International Gold Songs	Won	
RTHK International Pop Poll Awards	2022	"Leave the Door Open" (with Anderson .Paak as Silk Sonic)	Top 10 Gold International Gold Songs	Won	
RTHK International Pop Poll Awards	2024	Bruno Mars	Top Male Artist	Gold	
RTHK International Pop Poll Awards	2024	Top 10 Gold International Gold Songs	"Die With a Smile" (with Lady Gaga)	Won	
RTHK International Pop Poll Awards	2025	Top 10 Gold International Gold Songs	"APT." (with Rosé)	Won	
SEC Awards	2025	Bruno Mars	International Male Artist of the Year	Nominated	
SEC Awards	2025	"Die With a Smile" (with Lady Gaga)	International Feat of the Year	Nominated	
SEC Awards	2025	"APT." (with Rosé)	International Feat of the Year	Nominated	
SEC Awards	2025	"APT." (with Rosé)	International Song of the Year	Nominated	
SEC Awards	2026	Bruno Mars	International Male Artist of the Year	Nominated	
SNHCA Top Honor Awards	2024	Bruno Mars	Best Musical Headliner	Won	
SNHCA Top Honor Awards	2025	Bruno Mars	Best Musical Headliner	Won	
SNHCA Top Honor Awards	2025	Pinky Ring	Best Launge	Won	
Silver Clef Award	2015	Bruno Mars	Best Live Act	Nominated	
Soul Train Music Awards	2010	"Nothin' on You" (with B.o.B)	Song of the Year	Won	
Soul Train Music Awards	2011	Bruno Mars	Best New Artist	Nominated	
Soul Train Music Awards	2013	Bruno Mars	Best R&B/Soul Male Artist	Nominated	
Soul Train Music Awards	2013	"Treasure"	Best Dance Performance	Nominated	
Soul Train Music Awards	2015	"Uptown Funk" (with Mark Ronson)			
Soul Train Music Awards	2015	"Uptown Funk" (with Mark Ronson)	Video of the Year	Won	
Soul Train Music Awards	2015	"Uptown Funk" (with Mark Ronson)	Song of the Year	Won	
Soul Train Music Awards	2015	"Uptown Funk" (with Mark Ronson)	The Ashford & Simpson Songwriter's Award	Nominated	
Soul Train Music Awards	2015	"Uptown Funk" (with Mark Ronson)	Best Collaboration	Nominated	
Soul Train Music Awards	2015	"Uptown Funk" (with Mark Ronson)	Best Dance Performance	Nominated	
Soul Train Music Awards	2017	24K Magic	Album/ Mixtape of the Year	Won	
Soul Train Music Awards	2017	"That's What I Like"	Song of the Year	Won	
Soul Train Music Awards	2017	"Versace on the Floor"	The Ashford & Simpson Songwriter's Award	Nominated	
Soul Train Music Awards	2017	Bruno Mars	Best R&B/Soul Male Artist	Won	
Soul Train Music Awards	2017	"24K Magic"	Best Dance Performance	Won	
Soul Train Music Awards	2017	"24K Magic"	Video of the Year	Won	
Soul Train Music Awards	2018	Bruno Mars	Best R&B/Soul Male Artist	Won	
Soul Train Music Awards	2018	"Finesse" (featuring Cardi B)	Song of the Year	Nominated	
Soul Train Music Awards	2018	"Finesse" (featuring Cardi B)	The Ashford & Simpson Songwriter's Award	Nominated	
Soul Train Music Awards	2018	"Finesse" (featuring Cardi B)	Best Dance Performance	Nominated	
Soul Train Music Awards	2018	"Finesse" (featuring Cardi B)	Best Collaboration Performance	Nominated	
Soul Train Music Awards	2018	"Finesse" (featuring Cardi B)	Video of the Year	Won	
Soul Train Music Awards	2019	Bruno Mars	Best R&B/Soul Male Artist	Nominated	
Soul Train Music Awards	2019	"Please Me" (with Cardi B)	Best Collaboration Performance	Nominated	
Soul Train Music Awards	2021	"Leave the Door Open" (with Anderson .Paak as Silk Sonic)	Song of the Year	Won	
Soul Train Music Awards	2021	"Leave the Door Open" (with Anderson .Paak as Silk Sonic)	The Ashford & Simpson Songwriter's Award	Won	
Soul Train Music Awards	2021	"Leave the Door Open" (with Anderson .Paak as Silk Sonic)	Video of the Year	Won	
Soul Train Music Awards	2022	An Evening With Silk Sonic	Album/ Mixtape of the Year	Nominated	
Soul Train Music Awards	2022	Smokin out the Window" (with Anderson .Paak as Silk Sonic)	Best Dance Performance	Nominated	
Soul Train Music Awards	2022	Smokin out the Window" (with Anderson .Paak as Silk Sonic)	Video of the Year	Won	
Soul Train Music Awards	2026	''I Just Might''	R&B/Soul Song of The Year	Pending	
Space Shower Music Awards	2017	Bruno Mars	Best International Artist	Won	
Swiss Music Awards	2012	Doo-Wops & Hooligans	Best Album Pop Rock International	Nominated	
Swiss Music Awards	2012	"Grenade"	Best Hit International	Nominated	
Swiss Music Awards	2012	Bruno Mars	Best Breaking Act International	Won	
Swiss Music Awards	2026	Rosé and Bruno Mars	Best Group International	Won	
TEC Awards	2014	Record Production/Album	Unorthodox Jukebox	Nominated	
TEC Awards	2014	Record Production/Single or Track	"Locked Out of Heaven"	Nominated	
TEC Awards	2018	Record Production/Album	24K Magic	Won	
TEC Awards	2018	Record Production/Single or Track	"24K Magic"	Won	
TEC Awards	2018	Tour/Event Sound Production	24K Magic World Tour	Won	
TEC Awards	2019	Record Production/Single or Track	"Finesse"	Nominated	
Teen Choice Awards	2010	"Nothin' on You" (with B.o.B)	Choice Music: Single	Nominated	
Teen Choice Awards	2010	"Billionaire" (with Travie McCoy)	Choice Music: Summer Song	Nominated	
Teen Choice Awards	2011	Bruno Mars	Choice Music: Breakout Artist	Won	
Teen Choice Awards	2011	Bruno Mars	Choice Summer: Music Star – Male	Won	
Teen Choice Awards	2011	Bruno Mars	Choice Music: Male Artist	Nominated	
Teen Choice Awards	2011	"Just the Way You Are"	Choice Music: Love Song	Nominated	
Teen Choice Awards	2011	"Grenade"	Choice Music: Break-Up Song	Nominated	
Teen Choice Awards	2011	"The Lazy Song"	Choice Music: Summer Song	Nominated	
Teen Choice Awards	2012	Bruno Mars	Choice Music: Male Artist	Nominated	
Teen Choice Awards	2012	"It Will Rain"	Choice Music: Single by a Male Artist	Nominated	
Teen Choice Awards	2013	Bruno Mars	Choice Music: Male Artist	Nominated	
Teen Choice Awards	2013	Bruno Mars	Choice Music: R&B Artist	Won	
Teen Choice Awards	2013	Bruno Mars	Choice Music Star: Male	Won	
Teen Choice Awards	2013	"Locked Out of Heaven"	Choice Single: Male Artist	Nominated	
Teen Choice Awards	2013	"Treasure"	Choice Music: Love Song	Nominated	
Teen Choice Awards	2013	"Treasure"	Choice Summer: Single	Nominated	
Teen Choice Awards	2013	"When I Was Your Man"	Choice Music: Break-Up song	Nominated	
Teen Choice Awards	2013	Moonshine Jungle Tour	Choice Summer Tour	Nominated	
Teen Choice Awards	2015	"Uptown Funk" (with Mark Ronson)	Choice Song: Male Artist	Nominated	
Teen Choice Awards	2015	"Uptown Funk" (with Mark Ronson)	Choice Party Song	Nominated	
Teen Choice Awards	2015	"Uptown Funk" (with Mark Ronson)	Choice Music: Collaboration	Nominated	
Teen Choice Awards	2017	Bruno Mars	Choice Male Artist	Nominated	
Teen Choice Awards	2017	"That's What I Like"	Choice Song: Male Artist	Nominated	
Teen Choice Awards	2017	"That's What I Like"	Choice Music: Summer Song	Nominated	
Teen Choice Awards	2017	"That's What I Like"	Choice Music: R&B/Hip-Hop Song	Nominated	
Teen Choice Awards	2017	"24K Magic"	Choice Music: Pop Song	Nominated	
Teen Choice Awards	2017	24K Magic World Tour	Choice Summer: Tour	Nominated	
Teen Choice Awards	2017	Bruno Mars	Visionary Award †	Won	
Teen Choice Awards	2018	Bruno Mars	Choice Artist: Male	Nominated	
Teen Choice Awards	2018	"Finesse" (featuring Cardi B)	Choice Music: Collaboration	Nominated	
Teen Choice Awards	2018	"Finesse" (featuring Cardi B)	Choice Music: R&B/Hip-Hop Song	Nominated	
Telehit Awards	2013	Unorthodox Jukebox	Best Male Pop Album	Won	
Telehit Awards	2015	"Uptown Funk" (with Mark Ronson)	Song of the Year	Won	
Telehit Awards	2017	"That's What I Like"	Song of the Year	Nominated	
The Record of the Year	2010	"Just the Way You Are"	The Record of the Year	Nominated	
The Record of the Year	2011	"Grenade"	The Record of the Year	Nominated	
Variety Hitmakers Awards	2025	Bruno Mars	Variety's Songwriter of the Year Award	Won	
UK Music Video Awards	2011	"The Lazy Song"	Best Pop Video-UK	Nominated	
UK Music Video Awards	2015	"Uptown Funk"	Best Pop Video-UK	Won	
Urban Music Awards	2011	Bruno Mars	International Artist of the Year	Nominated	
Urban Music Awards	2013	Bruno Mars	International Artist of the Year	Won	
Virgin Media Music Awards	2011	Bruno Mars	Virgin Media Music Award for Best Solo Male	Nominated	
Webby Awards	2025	APT. YouTube Shorts Challenge (with Rosé)	Arts & Entertainment, Social Video Short Form (Social)	Won	
World Choice Awards	2026	Bruno Mars	Favorite Male Artist	Won	
Z Awards	2010	Bruno Mars	Best New Artist	Won	

== Other accolades ==
=== Guinness World Records ===
As of February 2026, Mars has acquired ten Guinness World Records.

Key
†	Indicates a former world-record holder

Year the record was awarded, title of the record, and the record holder
Year	Record	Record holder	Ref.
2015	† Most Viewed Halftime Performance (Note: In 2014, Mars's halftime show attracted the largest audience in the history of the Super Bowl, 115.3 million viewers.This record was broken on the following year Katy Perry's Super Bowl XLIX halftime show.)	Super Bowl XLVIII halftime show (starring Mars)	
2017	† Most weeks at No.1 on the U.S. Digital Song Sales (Note: "Uptown Funk" tied the record for most weeks spent at the top of the Digital Song Sales chart with Flo Rida's "Low" (2007) featuring T-Pain (13 weeks). This record was broken two years after by Luis Fonsi and Daddy Yankee's "Despacito" (2017) featuring Justin Bieber (17 weeks).)	"Uptown Funk"	
2017	First Male Artist to achieve three 10-million-selling-singles (Note: In 2015, Mars became the first male artist to achieve three 10-million-selling singles with "Just the Way You Are" (2010), "Grenade" (2010) and "Uptown Funk!" (2014).)	Bruno Mars	
2017	Most followed male chart-topper on Musical.ly (Note: On May 11, 2017, Mars became the Most followed male chart-topper on Musical.ly. with 1.2 million followers. However, American social media personality and singer Jacob Sartorius has 16.7 million followers.)	Bruno Mars	
2024	Fastest song to reached 1 billion streams on Spotify	"Die with a Smile" (with Lady Gaga)	
2024	Most Monthly Listeners on Spotify (Male) (Note: On February 12, 2015, Mars became the first male with Most Monthly Listeners on Spotify with 151,079,821 at the time.)	Bruno Mars	
2025	Fastest K-pop track to reach 1 billion streams on Spotify	"APT." (with Rosé)	
2025	Most days at No.1 on Spotify's "Daily Top Songs Global" chart	"Die With a Smile" (with Lady Gaga)	
2025	Most streamed track on Spotify (2025)	"Die With a Smile" (with Lady Gaga)	
2026	Largest concert in a videogame in 'Steal a Brainrot' on Roblox	Bruno Mars	

=== Listicles ===
Name of publisher, name of listicle, year(s) listed, and placement result
Publisher	Listicle	Year(s)	Result	Ref.
Associated Press	Album of the Decade	2019	10th (24K Magic)	
Billboard	Artist of the Year	2013	Placed	
Billboard	Hot 100 Songwriters	2013	6th	
Billboard	Top 10 Producers in Music (as The Smeezingtons)	2013	3rd	
Billboard	The Greatest Pop Star By Year	2013	Honorable Mention	
Billboard	The Greatest Pop Star By Year	2017	Honorable Mention	
Billboard	The Greatest Pop Star By Year	2021	Honorable Mention	
Billboard	The Greatest Pop Star By Year	2024	Honorable Mention	
Billboard	Top Touring Artists of the 2010s	2019	14th	
Billboard	The 10 Best Years For Modern Pop Stardom	2020	9th	
Billboard	Top Artist of the 2010s	2021	3rd	
Billboard	Greatest Pop Stars of the 21st Century	2024	20th	
Billboard	Global 200 Artists	2025	24th	
Forbes	30 Under 30			
Forbes	30 Under 30	2012	Placed	
Forbes	30 Under 30	2013	Placed	
Forbes	30 Under 30	2014	Callout	
Forbes	Celebrity 100	2014	13th	
Forbes	Celebrity 100	2015	52th	
Forbes	Celebrity 100	2017	60th	
Forbes	Celebrity 100	2018	11th	
Forbes	Celebrity 100	2019	54th	
Forbes	The Highest-Paid Musicians	2025	22nd	
Gold House	A100 List (with Anderson .Paak as Silk Sonic)	2022	Honoree	
Gold House	Gold100 List	2026	Honoree	
iHeartRadio Canada	Icons of the Decade	2019	Placed	
Insider	The Top 20 Artists of the 2010s	2019	Honorable Mention	
Music Week	Biggest Songwriters of the Year (as The Smeezingtons)	2010	1st	
The Hollywood Reporter	Top Hitmakers (as The Smeezingtons)	2013	5th	
Time	Time 100 (with tribute written by B.o.B)	2011	Placed	
