= 24K Magic =

24K Magic may refer to:

- 24K Magic (album), a 2016 album by Bruno Mars
  - "24K Magic" (song), the album's title track
  - 24K Magic World Tour, a concert tour
