= Chunky (Bruno Mars song) =

2017 single by Bruno Mars

Single by Bruno Mars

from the album 24K Magic
- Released: November 29, 2017
- Studio: Glenwood Place (Burbank, California)
- Genre: Funk; electro-funk
- Length: 3:06
- Label: Warner Music Australia; Atlantic
- Songwriters: Bruno Mars; Philip Lawrence; Christopher Brody Brown; James Fauntleroy
- Producers: Shampoo Press & Curl

Bruno Mars singles chronology
"Versace on the Floor" (2017)	"Chunky" (2017)	"Finesse" (2018)

"Chunky" is a song by American singer Bruno Mars from his third studio album 24K Magic (2016). It was solely released as a radio single in Australia on November 29, 2017, by Warner Music Australia and Atlantic, and served as the album's fourth single. "Chunky" was co-written by Mars, Philip Lawrence, Christopher Brody Brown, and James Fauntleroy. Mars, Lawrence, and Brown produced the song under their alias, Shampoo Press & Curl. Musically, "Chunky" is a funk and electro-funk ballad, while lyrically acting as an anthem for big buttocks.

The track received mixed reviews from music critics. They noted the resemblance between "Chunky" and the works of rhythm and blues artists from the 1980s and 1990s. The song reached number 79 on the UK Singles Chart and 34 on the French Singles Chart in 2016, as well as was certified gold in the United States by the Recording Industry Association of America (RIAA), platinum by Music Canada (MC) and double platinum by Recorded Music NZ (RMNZ). Mars performed "Chunky" during his 24K Magic World Tour (2017–2018), as well as on television shows including on Saturday Night Live in October 2016 prior to its release.

== Production and release ==
"Chunky" was written by Bruno Mars, Philip Lawrence, Christopher Brody Brown, and James Fauntleroy. The production was handled by the former three under their alias, Shampoo Press & Curl. The Stereotypes were in charge of programming the drums, while Mars, Lawrence, Brown, Fauntleroy, and Lisenny sang background vocals. "Chunky" was recorded at Glenwood Place Studios in Burbank, California with engineer Charles Moniz, with Jacob Denis as additional engineering assistance. The song was mixed by Serban Ghenea at MixStar Studios in Virginia Beach, with John Hanes serving as a mixing engineer. It was mastered by Tom Coyne at Sterling Sound, NYC. "Chunky" was solely released as a single in Australia to contemporary hit radio stations on November 29, 2017, by Warner Music Australia and Atlantic.

== Composition ==
"Chunky"
An 18-second sample of "Chunky", where Mars sings the chorus.

"Chunky" is a funk and electro-funk ballad featuring synthesizers and drum machines. The single is a mid-tempo track with a "silky pre-chorus" and a basic structure revolving around synthesizers and a "popping" bass. The song has female harmonies on the background vocals which alternate with "slower, deeper grooves". According to the digital sheet music, "Chunky" was composed in the key of E-flat major with a tempo of 100 beats per minute in common time.

"Chunky" is reminiscent of rhythm and blues songs from the 1980s and 1990s. Andy Kellman, writing for AllMusic, said that the song recalled the works of Shalamar and even Mars's own "Treasure" (2013). The track "echoes down to the letter structure" of Cameo's "Candy" (1986); further reminsiscenece was noted to the chorus of "Outstanding" (1983) by The Gap Band and to New Edition's "Candy Girl" (1982). Troy L. Smith from The Plain Dealer thought the song had the "soulful synths" from Michael Jackson's Off the Wall (1979). The "organic sound" of "Chunky" reflects the decade where neo soul began to replace new jack swing, according to Craig Jenkins from Vulture. Lyrically, "Chunky" is a song about sex and the search for a "sumptuous damsel", and is, ultimately, an anthem for big buttocks. Its lyrics include: "Lemme hear you say I'm ready / Girl, you better have your hair weave strapped on tight / Girl, once we get goin', we rollin', we cha cha 'til the morning / So just say alright / If you ain't here to party / Take your ass back home".

== Critical reception ==
"Chunky" has received mixed reviews from music critics. Carl Lamarre writing for HipHopDX said the track "screams hit-record", and Annie Zaleski from The A.V. Club dubbed the song as the "standout" of the album. Christina Lee of Idolator praised "Chunky" saying it is "fit for line-dancing at Snoop Dogg's backyard cookout." However, Jonathan Wroble at Slant Magazine criticized the song for being a "copycat" of Michael Jackson's "Baby Be Mine" (1982), while The Independent's Andy Gill said "Chunky" was missing the "roguish and cheeky charm" of "Baby Got Back" (1992) by Sir Mixalot. Nick Levine of NME condemns Mars's lyrics for being "old-fashioned" as he "sizes up a woman's body." Levine concluded that Mars is "better off being kitsch than creepy."

== Commercial performance ==
Upon the release of its parent album 24K Magic, "Chunky" charted on the Portuguese and UK Singles charts, peaking at numbers 94 and 79, respectively. It was, eventually, certified silver by the British Phonographic Industry (BPI). The song debuted at number 66 on the South Korea International Chart and at number 34 on the French Singles Chart on the week ending November 26, 2016. Around the same time, the "Chunky" hit number 108 on the Bubbling Under Hot 100 chart, which acts as an extension to the Billboard Hot 100. It further debuted and peaked at number 44 on the Billboard Hot R&B/Hip-Hop Songs. After its release in Australia in November 2017, "Chunky" was placed in rotation nationally by radio stations. It was certified gold in the United States by the Recording Industry Association of America (RIAA), platinum by Music Canada (MC) and double platinum by Recorded Music NZ (RMNZ).

== Live performances ==
Mars performed "Chunky" live for the first time on October 15, 2016, on Saturday Night Live. According to the Billboard staff, the performance was a "dazzling tour-de-force" as it showed off Mars's vocals and his "inner Michael Jackson." He also performed the song at the Victoria's Secret Fashion Show 2016 during the Pink Nation segment and in 2017 on the Japanese television show News Zero. Mars performed the single at the Apollo Theater alongside the majority of the 24K Magic album for his CBS prime time special titled Bruno Mars: 24K Magic Live at the Apollo, which aired on November 29, 2017. "Chunky" was the sixth song on the set list of his third tour, 24K Magic World Tour (2017–18).

== Personnel ==
Credits adapted from the liner notes of 24K Magic.

- Bruno Mars – lead vocals, songwriting, background vocals
- Philip Lawrence – songwriting, background vocals
- Christopher Brody Brown – songwriting, background vocals
- James Fauntleroy – songwriting, background vocals
- Shampoo Press & Curl – production
- Lisenny – background vocals
- The Stereotypes – additional drum programming
- Charles Moniz – recording, engineering
- Jacob Dennis – engineering assistance
- Serban Ghenea – mixing
- John Hanes – mix engineering
- Tom Coyne – mastering

== Charts ==
=== Weekly charts ===
List of chart positions
Chart (2016–2017)	Peak position
France (SNEP)	34
New Zealand Heatseekers (RMNZ)	2
Portugal (AFP)	94
South Korea International Chart (Gaon)	66
UK Singles (Official Charts)	79
US Bubbling Under Hot 100 (Billboard)	8
US Hot R&B/Hip-Hop Songs (Billboard)	44

== Certifications ==
List of certifications
Region	Certification	Certified units/sales
Canada (Music Canada)	Platinum	80,000^{‡}
New Zealand (RMNZ)	2× Platinum	60,000^{‡}
United Kingdom (BPI)	Silver	200,000^{‡}
United States (RIAA)	Gold	500,000^{‡}
^{‡} Sales+streaming figures based on certification alone.
