= Kiss My Bundt Bakery =

Bakery in Los Angeles, California

Kiss My Bundt Bakery is a purveyor of bundt cakes, other baked goods, coffee, and cooking classes on Third Street, in Los Angeles, California. It is owned by Chrysta Wilson who is also the author of the Kiss My Bundt Cookbook.

== Description ==
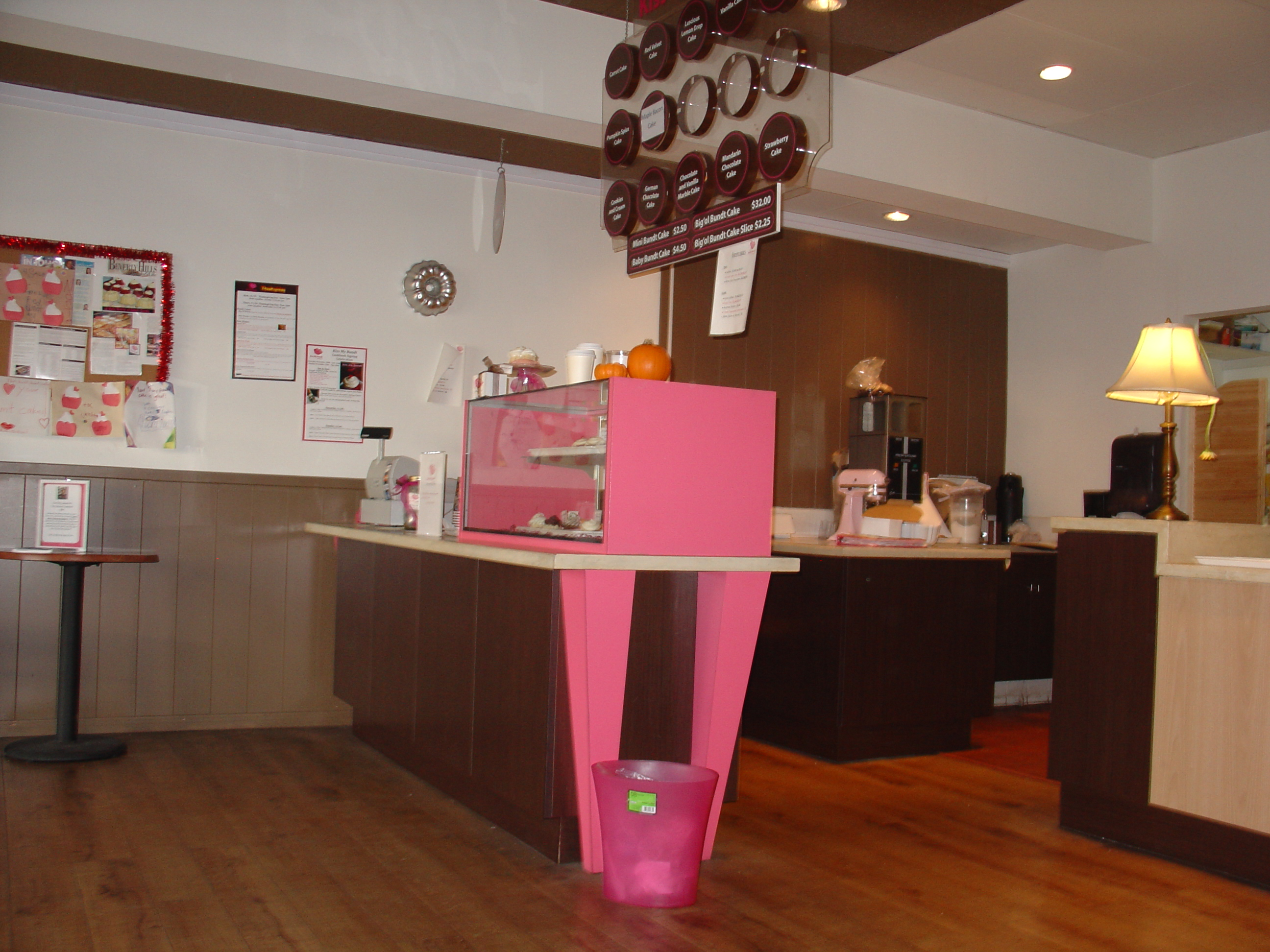
Kiss My Bundt Bakery interior

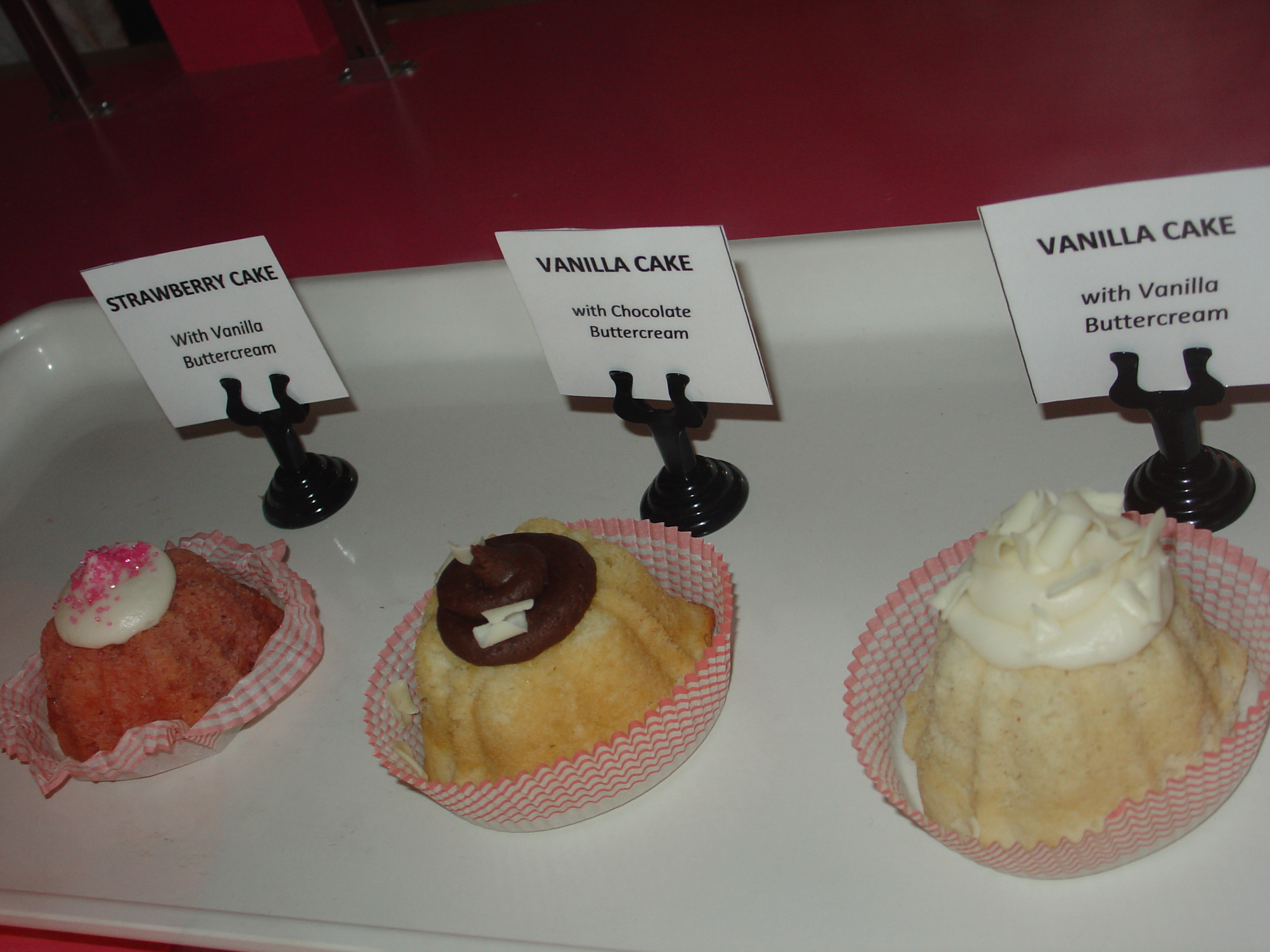
Kiss My Bundt Bakery's mini bundt cakes

Kiss My Bundt opened August 2008 and sells 10 inch "big ol' Bundts", 4-inch "baby bundts" and 2½-inch "mini-bundts" in 50 rotating varieties such as red velvet with cream cheese frosting, lemon syrup-soaked citrus, raspberry lemonade, champagne, marble cake, cappuccino, pumpkin, coconut, lime basil, mandarin orange chocolate and almond. The maple bacon bundt was featured on the LA Times blog.

The bakery came in first place in 2008 for MyFoxLA's "Best Cupcakes in the Los Angeles area" and made the top five in 2009. The store has been noted in US Weekly, MSNBC.com, The Poly Post and 944 Magazine.

== Background and community building ==
Wilson is from the American South (Atlanta, North Carolina, and Danville California) and was a community organizer before switching careers. She is a volunteer board member for the West 3rd Street Business Association, has donated more than 100-dozen mini bundts to schools and charities, partnered with nonprofits to help emerging entrepreneurs, hosted interns from local urban high schools to teach them about entrepreneurship, and served as a volunteer panelist to speak about her experiences in community building and "opening her bakery to inspire young people and adults to chase their dreams and follow their hearts." She has stated that, "I know there aren't very many African-American-owned businesses in the Beverly Hills and West Hollywood areas where my bakery is located," adding that she feels fortunate to have been able get her business opened and established in the community.
