= 24K Magic World Tour =

2017–18 concert tour by Bruno Mars

- World tour by Bruno Mars
- Promotional poster for the tour
- Location: Africa; Asia; Europe; North America; Oceania; South America
- Associated album: 24K Magic
- Start date: March 28, 2017
- End date: December 31, 2018
- Legs: 8
- No. of shows: 191
- Box office: US$396.1 million

Bruno Mars concert chronology
- Bruno Mars at Park MGM (2016–25); 24K Magic World Tour (2017–18); An Evening with Silk Sonic at Park MGM (2022)

The 24K Magic World Tour was the fourth concert tour of American singer-songwriter Bruno Mars that was performed in support of his third studio album 24K Magic (2016) from March 2017 to December 2018. Anderson .Paak was the opening act for the first European leg while Camila Cabello, Dua Lipa, and Jorja Smith opened the shows during the first North American leg. In Latin America, DNCE, Bebe Rexha, and Nick Jonas were the supporting acts, and in Oceania, Lipa and DJ Leggo My Fueggo opened shows. The second European leg included appearances at several music festivals such as Pinkpop in the Netherlands and Rock in Rio in Portugal. It was Mars's first tour to include a show in Africa, where he appeared at the Mawazine festival in Morocco.

In 2018, Mars announced another tour leg in North America; it was initially to feature Cardi B but she wanted to raise her newborn child and was replaced with Boyz II Men, Ciara, Ella Mai and Charlie Wilson. Apart from 24K Magic, the tour setlist included songs from Mars's previous albums Doo-Wops & Hooligans (2010) and Unorthodox Jukebox (2012), as well as the Mark Ronson-Mars collaboration "Uptown Funk" (2014), which was often used for the encores alongside "Locked Out of Heaven". Mars was backed by an eight-piece band called The Hooligans and performed dances choreographed by him and Phil Tayag.

The 24K Magic World Tour received generally positive reviews from music critics, who praised Mars's showmanship and his guitar solos, as well as the stage production. His shows attracted a wide-ranging audience of all age groups and grossed over $396,1 million, making the 24K Magic World Tour a commercial success and one of the highest-grossing concert tours of all time. It won two Pollstar awards, two Billboard Music Awards and a TEC Award.

== Background and production ==
The 24K Magic World Tour, with 85 dates across Europe and North America, was officially announced on November 15, 2016. On November 22, 2016, 15 additional shows were added, bringing the number to 100. At that time, the tour's producers Live Nation Entertainment reported that over one million tickets for the tour had been sold in a single day. Promotional trailers and behind-the-scenes footage of the tour were released through Live Nation on several official YouTube channels as additional promotion in some markets including Germany and Hong Kong. Bruno Mars, together with Phil Tayag of the hip-hop dance crew Jabbawockeez, choreographed the tour while the production and lighting design were handled by LeRoy Bennett, who worked with Mars on his Moonshine Jungle Tour (2013–2014). On May 2, 2017, Mars partnered with Heineken to sell tickets for his U.S. shows in selected cities; fans could obtain tickets by donating $150 to Heineken's Cities Project, which was intended to improve U.S. cities, via the Indiegogo crowdfunding platform. The tour's South American leg was sponsored by Banco do Brasil and Budweiser, and Hospital Sancta Maggiore was the official supplier. Pepsi was the official soft-drink partner during the Asian leg of the tour, which visited China, Thailand, the Philippines, Singapore and Malaysia.

According to Front of House (FOH) engineer Chris Rabold, Mars had a say in every aspect of the tour's shows, which he envisioned as a huge party. Rehearsals for the 24K Magic World Tour commenced at Center Staging in Burbank, California, in mid-2016; they included only The Hooligans as performers, assisted by monitor engineer Ramon Morales, who mixed the monitors for Mars. Morales then moved to the Rock Lititz rehearsal facility for a few weeks to complete work on the tour's production using equipment made by Clair Global, the tour's official sound equipment provider. Rabold and Morales used two DiGiCo SD7 mixing consoles and monitors for the tour's production. The Hooligans used Sennheiser 9000 series microphones while Mars used a Sennheiser 5235. Microphones made by Shure, Telefunken and Mojave were used for the drums while the guitars had AT4050s, SM57s and Royer 122s microphones. The horns used DPA 4099s, the bass an Avalon U5 and the synth had both a Sennheiser 906s and a Beyer M88 microphone.

Morales used the DiGiCo's onboard effects such as reverbs, delays, dynamic equalization and compression on the inputs. He also chose an Avalon 737 for Mars's vocals, as well as a Brascati M7 reverb and TC system 6000. The public address system (PA) used on the tour was Clair Global's Cohesion system. Lighting designer Cory FitzGerald and production designer LeRoy Bennett used the Philips VL6000 Beam and VL4000 BeamWash fixtures for the tour. These have a retro-style appearance to match the shows' 1990s theme and blend with the more contemporary-looking classic Par Can lights' bright colors and textures. The VL4000 BeamWash provided backlight, sidelight, and bright-and-bold effects. Around 214 Solaris Flares were used in pixel mode, including the wash features and the strobe lights.

== Concert synopsis ==
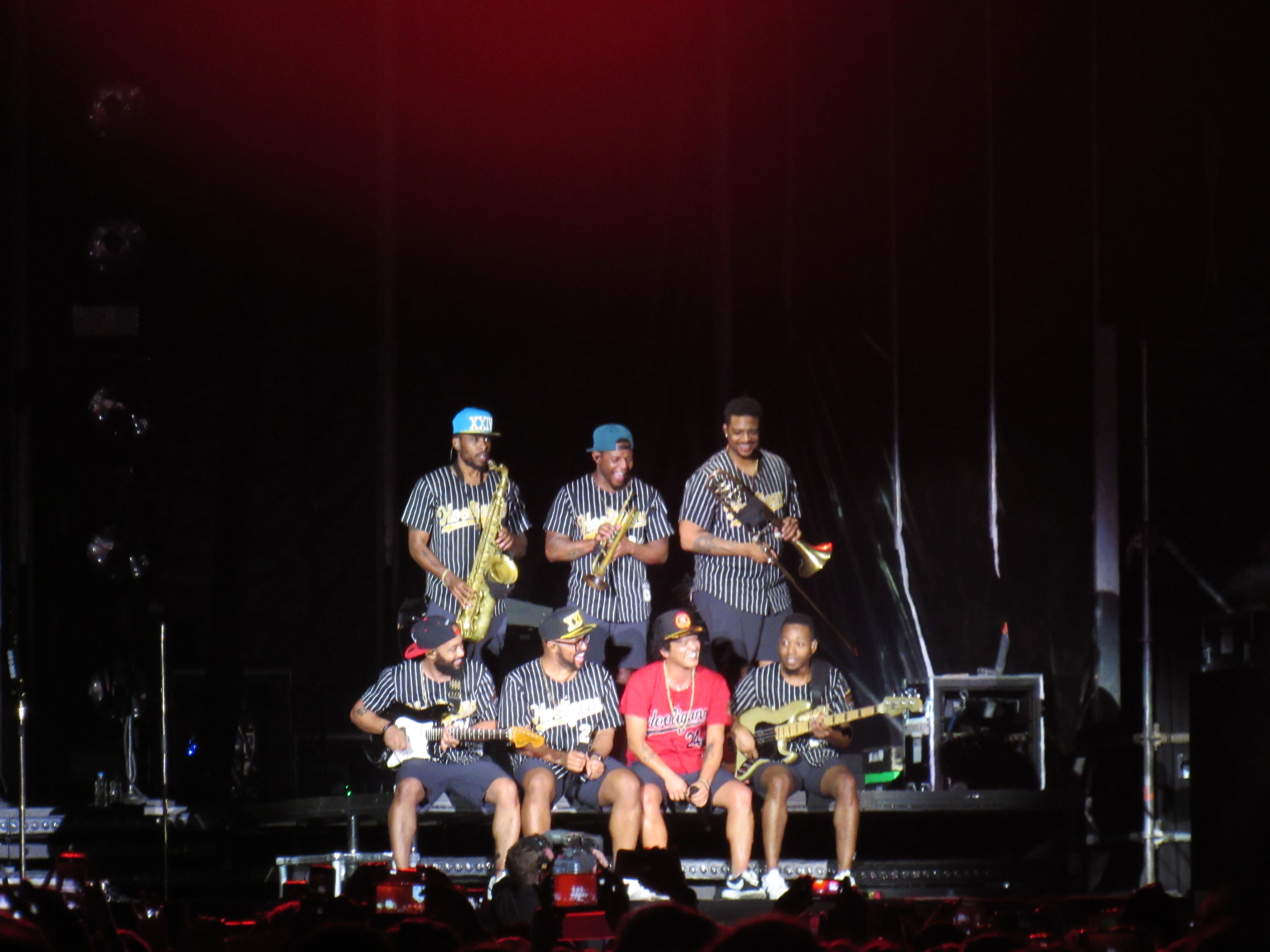
Mars and The Hooligans during the 24K Magic World Tour in Bogotá, Colombia in 2017.

During the first leg of the tour in Europe, shows were opened by Anderson .Paak, who drummed and sang simultaneously. The shows in North America—except for the first two shows, which opened with Jabbawockeez—had either Camila Cabello, Dua Lipa or Jorja Smith as the opening act. On November 18, 2017, the Latin American leg of the tour began with DNCE, and ended with Bebe Rexha and Nick Jonas. Initially, all concerts in Oceania were scheduled to be opened by Lipa but she canceled four dates due to dental problems and was replaced by DJ Leggo My Fueggo. During the second European and North American legs of the tour, Mars had several opening acts, including DJ Rashida, at every show. Charlie Wilson, Ciara, Boyz II Men and other high-profile acts appeared on select occasions, replacing Cardi B, who wanted to raise her newborn baby, on the North American leg. At all shows, a large, black curtain was used to introduce Mars's band, The Hooligans, who were followed by text asking if the audience was ready to "get hot and sweaty".

"Finesse" opened the set against a backdrop of colorful, pulsing tower panels. During the performance of the follow-up song "24K Magic", which led to the audience cheering and dancing, the tower panels changed colors and were complemented by fireworks. At this point, Mars would shout, "We have been waiting a long time to come back ... we gonna have some fun tonight!", before continuing dancing to "Treasure" and "Perm". During "Perm", Mars invited his fans to take pictures of him and The Hooligans, briefly stopping the show. During "Calling All My Lovelies", the next track on the setlist, Mars played his guitar in a tribute to Prince; Mars pretended to call his lover on a "Zack Morris-style phone" but she did not answer the call. This was followed by the "racier" songs "Chunky" and "That's What I Like", on which critics said Mars and his band sounded like Boyz II Men. The singer "turned up the sexual energy" with "Straight Up & Down", which has "risqué" subject matter but was delivered in a "family friendly and inoffensive" way.

The setlist continued with "Versace on the Floor", during which Mars was lifted on a platform with golden lighting and purple beacons. The next number, "Marry You", had Mars and The Hooligans performing a "soft-shoe" dance while Mars played guitar. On the subsequent "Runaway Baby", Mars and his band performed "pelvic" dance moves that critics compared to Elvis Presley; there followed a breakdown similar to James Brown's work. During the song, the lights dimmed and only a bass solo was being played. Afterwards, a modified routine of The Isley Brothers' song "Shout" had Mars dropping to the floor then emerging from it with a roar. Later on, the stage was occupied only by Mars and two keyboard players for the piano ballad "When I Was Your Man". A piano solo led up to the next ballad "Grenade", to which was Mars give a rock interpretation by playing his guitar. Shots of fireballs were featured during the song.

The next song on the 2017 setlist was the ballad "Just the Way You Are", which was performed before the encore. For the encore, they returned to perform "Locked Out of Heaven", during which golden confetti was poured on the audience, and the closing song "Uptown Funk", during which fireworks and smoke prompted men dressed as firefighters to use fire extinguishers to put them out. Throughout the tour, modified setlists were used. "Too Good to Say Goodbye" was only performed in Madrid and Antwerp as the closing track. "Billionaire" replaced "Calling All My Lovelies" during Mars's second date in Rio de Janeiro. "Talking to the Moon" was performed once, as an encore, in São Paulo. In some shows, "Grenade" was replaced with "Gorilla" or a mash-up of "Nothin' on You" and "It Will Rain". In 2018, "Grenade" and "Straight Up & Down" were removed from the setlist of several concerts.

On July 10, 2018, during a concert at Glasgow Green, in Scotland, Mars and his band had to evacuate the stage due to a fire. It was caused by "a planned fireworks display that caused the lighting rig to catch fire". The incident didn't cause any injuries.

== Critical response ==
Selected shows of the tour received generally positive reviews from critics, who commended Mars's showmanship, his guitar skills and the stage production. Caroline Sullivan of The Guardian rated a show four stars out of five, saying; "It says something about his performance ethic that even during the formation dances he's clearly not miming – most pop singers do while dancing". Sullivan added most of the concert "comes from a wellspring of perspiration, musical education and at least a little inspiration". The Washington Post's Briana Younger called Mars a "once-in-a-generation artist", and "a master of his craft and consummate performer". Jesse Sendejas Jr., writing for the Houston Press, said Mars and his band "came to entertain and did that astonishingly well" in a show which, according to her, attracted a wide-ranging audience of all age groups and cultures. The Pittsburgh Post-Gazette's Scott Mervis lauded Mars's "silky voice" and his Michael Jackson-esque dance skills, "to which he adds a comic touch". Mervis concluded, "If [Jackson], Prince and James Brown are the 24K gold standard for what he's trying to do, Mars is well on his way toward that karat".

Tammy Kwan of The Georgia Straight called Mars's and The Hoolligans's performance "stellar", noting its "synchronized dancing and dazzling stage effects". Kwan added, "This concert was one for the books". The Music's Madelyn Tait praised the concert, writing; "Mars was able to leave a diverse, all-ages crowd [that was] satisfied with his funk and soul-infused pop and proved how capable he is of putting on a fun, entertaining arena show". Leticia Madrigal of The Clovis Roundup lauded Mars "do[ing] more than enough entertaining through his choreographed performance with his band and with his unmissable radio hits". Some critics found the performance of "When I Was Your Man" to be the highlight in the performances they commented on.

Mikael Wood of the Los Angeles Times said there were some "less polished moments" in the show he attended but that they were not accidental. Wood also said Mars had "gotten so good onstage that he's begun looking for a thrill beyond perfection" and concluded; "the impression Mars gave was of an artist eager to put some wrinkles into the gleaming surfaces for which he's known". Neil McCormick of The Telegraph gave a concert four stars out of five. He praised the choreography and the vocal harmonies, which he felt were inspired by Prince's "supernatural gifts", James Brown's "physical command", and Marvin Gaye's "smooth vocal flexibility". He did not, however, enjoy the band's "mustard and white baseball" outfits, saying they made them look like "servers at a fast-food chain".

In a mixed review, Luís Guerra from Blitz lauded one of the shows for its variety of genres but said Mars performed romantic songs inadequately. Radio New Zealand's Ellen Falconer commended Mars's showmanship, saying he put on a "hell of a show" and calling him one of the best performers of his generation. Nevertheless, she found him "over-polished" and felt "his own personality gets lost amongst [his] nostalgic references". Roisin O'Connor of The Independent gave a concert three stars out of five, saying songs like "Marry You" and "The Lazy Song" sounded "dated" when compared to those on 24K Magic. She concluded by saying "all the ingredients for a spectacular show are there, yet a stellar performance doesn't seem to reach the far corners of the arena".

=== Accolades ===
Year	Award	Category	Result	Ref.
2017	Billboard Touring Conference and Awards	Concert Marketing/Promotion	Nominated	
2017	Teen Choice Awards	Choice Summer: Tour	Nominated	
2017	Pollstar Award	Major Tour of the Year	Nominated	
2017	Pollstar Award	Pop Tour of the Year	Won	
2017	Pollstar Award	Urban/R&B Tour of the Year	Won	
2018	American Music Awards	Tour of the Year	Nominated	
2018	Billboard Music Awards	Top R&B Tour	Won	
2018	TEC Awards	Tour/Event Sound Production	Won	
2019	Billboard Music Awards	Top R&B Tour	Won	

== Commercial performance ==
According to an October 2017 Billboard article, the tour had sold 659,190 tickets at 42 concerts in 32 cities in North America and earned $76 million in revenue there. This included three sold-out shows at United Center in Chicago, which garnered $6.3 million. Concerts at the O2 Arena in London earned $6.6 million. In early 2018, it was reported 408,443 tickets had been sold for the ten shows Mars performed in Latin America, bringing in $37.4 million. In Asia, fourteen shows in seven cities were sold out while in Japan, the tour grossed $15.5 million from four shows at Saitama Super Arena.

In Australia, the 24K Magic World Tour with its five shows at Sydney's Qudos Bank Arena brought in $9.2 million. Mars broke Beyoncé's New Zealand concert attendance record in May 2017, surpassing her 44,596 ticket sales by selling 48,783 tickets for four sold-out concerts at Spark Arena in Auckland. In 2018, Mars sold out the three shows at the Aloha Stadium in Hawaii, breaking the attendance records of both U2 and Michael Jackson, who performed two nights for 50,000 people.

In 2017, StubHub ranked Mars as the biggest-touring act of the year in the United States, having sold more tickets than any other artist. The 24K Magic World Tour's total gross as of October 2017 was $129 million, which grew to $200 million as of January 2018. It was the fourth-highest-grossing tour of 2018 with a revenue of $237.8 million according to Billboard. Over a span of two years, the 24K Magic World Tour was reported to have grossed over $367,7 million. For Mars's November 8, 2018, concert in Hawaii, widespread ticket reselling activities occurred and bots were used to buy thousands of tickets. A similar phenomenon happened on his second show in the state. In 2026, Billboard reported the tour grossed a total of $396.1 million, selling 3.6 million tickets on 191 shows. It is among the highest-grossing concert tours of all time.

== Set lists ==
The set lists given below were performed in April 2017 and March 2018, respectively. The list evolved over the course of the tour, and sometimes included other numbers. These included "Too Good to Say Goodbye", "Gorilla", a mashup of "Nothin' On You" with "It Will Rain", "Talking to the Moon", "Billionaire", and "Thinking Out Loud" performed with Ed Sheeran.

First setlist
1. "Finesse"
2. "24K Magic"
3. "Treasure"
4. "Perm"
5. "Calling All My Lovelies"
6. "Chunky"
7. "That's What I Like"
8. "Straight Up & Down"
9. "Versace on the Floor"
10. "Marry You"
11. "Runaway Baby"
12. "When I Was Your Man"
13. "Grenade"
14. "Just the Way You Are"
15. "Locked Out of Heaven"
16. "Uptown Funk"

Second setlist

1. "Finesse"
2. "24K Magic"
3. "Treasure"
4. "Perm"
5. "Calling All My Lovelies"
6. "Chunky"
7. "That's What I Like"
8. "Versace on the Floor"
9. "Marry You"
10. "Runaway Baby"
11. "When I Was Your Man"
12. "Locked Out of Heaven"
13. "Just the Way You Are"

Encore

1. "Uptown Funk"

== Shows ==
Leg 1 – Europe
Date	City	Country	Venue	Opening act	Attendance (Tickets sold / available)	Revenue
March 28, 2017	Antwerp	Belgium	Sportpaleis	Anderson .Paak	42,710 / 43,512	$3,156,750
March 29, 2017	Antwerp	Belgium	Sportpaleis	Anderson .Paak	42,710 / 43,512	$3,156,750
March 31, 2017	Lille	France	Stade Pierre-Mauroy	Anderson .Paak	28,262 / 28,262	$1,690,680
April 3, 2017	Madrid	Spain	WiZink Center	Anderson .Paak	15,565 / 15,565	$1,229,943
April 4, 2017	Lisbon	Portugal	MEO Arena	Anderson .Paak	19,524 / 19,524	$1,113,187
April 7, 2017	Barcelona	Spain	Palau Sant Jordi	Anderson .Paak	17,909 / 17,909	$1,448,830
April 8, 2017	Montpellier	France	Sud de France Arena	Anderson .Paak	13,192 / 13,192	$875,999
April 10, 2017	Cologne	Germany	Lanxess Arena	Anderson .Paak	15,916 / 15,916	$1,016,492
April 12, 2017	Glasgow	Scotland	SSE Hydro	Anderson .Paak	24,640 / 24,920	$1,978,040
April 13, 2017	Glasgow	Scotland	SSE Hydro	Anderson .Paak	24,640 / 24,920	$1,978,040
April 15, 2017	Liverpool	England	Echo Arena	Anderson .Paak	10,921 / 10,921	$915,179
April 18, 2017	London	England	The O_{2} Arena	Anderson .Paak	71,135 / 71,135	$6,376,770
April 19, 2017	London	England	The O_{2} Arena	Anderson .Paak	71,135 / 71,135	$6,376,770
April 21, 2017	London	England	The O_{2} Arena	Anderson .Paak	71,135 / 71,135	$6,376,770
April 22, 2017	London	England	The O_{2} Arena	Anderson .Paak	71,135 / 71,135	$6,376,770
April 24, 2017	Birmingham	England	Arena Birmingham	Anderson .Paak	29,598 / 29,598	$2,479,958
April 25, 2017	Birmingham	England	Arena Birmingham	Anderson .Paak	29,598 / 29,598	$2,479,958
April 27, 2017	Nottingham	England	Motorpoint Arena Nottingham	Anderson .Paak	9,979 / 9,979	$868,980
April 29, 2017	Dublin	Ireland	3Arena	Anderson .Paak	25,464 / 25,464	$1,824,465
April 30, 2017	Dublin	Ireland	3Arena	Anderson .Paak	25,464 / 25,464	$1,824,465
May 2, 2017	Manchester	England	Manchester Arena	Anderson .Paak	33,110 / 33,604	$2,561,210
May 3, 2017	Manchester	England	Manchester Arena	Anderson .Paak	33,110 / 33,604	$2,561,210
May 5, 2017	Leeds	England	First Direct Arena	Anderson .Paak	11,636 / 11,636	$957,285
May 6, 2017	Sheffield	England	Sheffield Arena	Anderson .Paak	13,541 / 13,541	$1,166,841
May 9, 2017	Amsterdam	Netherlands	Ziggo Dome	Anderson .Paak	34,320 / 34,320	$2,568,374
May 10, 2017	Amsterdam	Netherlands	Ziggo Dome	Anderson .Paak	34,320 / 34,320	$2,568,374
May 12, 2017	Zürich	Switzerland	Hallenstadion	Anderson .Paak	13,888 / 13,888	$1,356,400
May 14, 2017	Munich	Germany	Olympiahalle	Anderson .Paak	13,005 / 13,005	$1,065,795
May 17, 2017	Hamburg	Germany	Barclaycard Arena	Anderson .Paak	13,570 / 13,930	$914,401
May 18, 2017	Copenhagen	Denmark	Royal Arena	Anderson .Paak	15,771 / 15,771	$1,361,962
May 20, 2017	Stockholm	Sweden	Ericsson Globe	Anderson .Paak	14,688 / 14,688	$939,321
May 22, 2017	Helsinki	Finland	Hartwall Arena	Anderson .Paak	12,980 / 12,980	$1,005,869
May 24, 2017	Oslo	Norway	Telenor Arena	Anderson .Paak	22,356 / 22,356	$1,693,662
May 26, 2017	Berlin	Germany	Mercedes-Benz Arena	Anderson .Paak	14,066 / 14,066	$1,041,406
May 27, 2017	Kraków	Poland	Tauron Arena	Anderson .Paak	18,528 / 18,528	$1,137,510
May 30, 2017	Budapest	Hungary	Budapest Sports Arena	Anderson .Paak	13,871 / 13,871	$791,265
June 1, 2017	Frankfurt	Germany	Festhalle Frankfurt	Anderson .Paak	11,841 / 11,841	$1,012,542
June 3, 2017	Vienna	Austria	Wiener Stadthalle	Anderson .Paak	13,827 / 13,827	$1,022,548
June 5, 2017	Paris	France	AccorHotels Arena	Anderson .Paak	33,608 / 33,608	$2,900,545
June 6, 2017	Paris	France	AccorHotels Arena	Anderson .Paak	33,608 / 33,608	$2,900,545
June 8, 2017	Lyon	France	Halle Tony Garnier	Anderson .Paak	16,235 / 16,235	$1,015,647
June 12, 2017	Bologna	Italy	Unipol Arena	Anderson .Paak	14,246 / 14,246	$850,732
June 14, 2017	Geneva	Switzerland	Geneva Arena	Anderson .Paak	7,343 / 7,343	$1,291,296
June 15, 2017	Milan	Italy	Mediolanum Forum	Anderson .Paak	11,172 / 11,172	$792,759

Leg 2 – North America
Date	City	Country	Venue	Opening act	Attendance (Tickets sold / available)	Revenue
July 15, 2017	Las Vegas	United States	T-Mobile Arena	Jabbawockeez	16,556 / 16,556	$1,947,649
July 18, 2017	Sacramento	United States	Golden 1 Center	Jabbawockeez	15,170 / 15,170	$1,586,433
July 20, 2017	San Jose	United States	SAP Center	Camila Cabello	28,444 / 28,444	$3,673,031
July 21, 2017	San Jose	United States	SAP Center	Camila Cabello	28,444 / 28,444	$3,673,031
July 23, 2017	Portland	United States	Moda Center	Camila Cabello	15,417 / 15,417	$1,655,665
July 24, 2017	Tacoma	United States	Tacoma Dome	Camila Cabello	19,454 / 19,454	$1,746,589
July 26, 2017	Vancouver	Canada	Rogers Arena	Camila Cabello	31,005 / 31,005	$3,430,130
July 27, 2017	Vancouver	Canada	Rogers Arena	Camila Cabello	31,005 / 31,005	$3,430,130
July 30, 2017	Edmonton	Canada	Rogers Place	Camila Cabello	29,301 / 29,301	$2,957,232
July 31, 2017	Edmonton	Canada	Rogers Place	Camila Cabello	29,301 / 29,301	$2,957,232
August 2, 2017	Winnipeg	Canada	Bell MTS Place	Camila Cabello	12,712 / 12,712	$1,395,447
August 4, 2017	Fargo	United States	Fargodome	Camila Cabello	18,489 / 18,489	$1,850,542
August 5, 2017	Saint Paul	United States	Xcel Energy Center	Camila Cabello	16,350 / 16,350	$1,905,256
August 7, 2017	Lincoln	United States	Pinnacle Bank Arena	Camila Cabello	14,105 / 14,105	$1,517,410
August 9, 2017	Kansas City	United States	Sprint Center	Camila Cabello	15,154 / 15,154	$1,660,106
August 12, 2017	Auburn Hills	United States	The Palace of Auburn Hills	Camila Cabello	16,013 / 16,013	$1,936,194
August 13, 2017	Indianapolis	United States	Bankers Life Fieldhouse	Camila Cabello	15,112 / 15,112	$1,635,885
August 15, 2017	Cleveland	United States	Quicken Loans Arena	Camila Cabello	17,103 / 17,103	$1,827,568
August 16, 2017	Chicago	United States	United Center	Camila Cabello	47,942 / 47,942	$6,347,950
August 18, 2017	Chicago	United States	United Center	Camila Cabello	47,942 / 47,942	$6,347,950
August 19, 2017	Chicago	United States	United Center	Camila Cabello	47,942 / 47,942	$6,347,950
August 22, 2017	Pittsburgh	United States	PPG Paints Arena	Camila Cabello	15,776 / 15,766	$1,761,947
August 24, 2017	Quebec City	Canada	Videotron Centre	N/A	15,099 / 15,099	$1,177,600
August 26, 2017	Toronto	Canada	Air Canada Centre	N/A	33,488 / 33,488	$3,896,146
August 27, 2017	Toronto	Canada	Air Canada Centre	N/A	33,488 / 33,488	$3,896,146
August 29, 2017	Montreal	Canada	Bell Centre	N/A	34,000 / 34,000	$3,480,770
August 30, 2017	Montreal	Canada	Bell Centre	N/A	34,000 / 34,000	$3,480,770
September 14, 2017	Charlotte	United States	Spectrum Center	Dua Lipa	15,931 / 15,931	$1,766,253
September 16, 2017 (Note: The show on September 16, 2017, in Atlanta at Piedmont Park was part of Music Midtown.)	Atlanta	United States	Piedmont Park	N/A		
September 17, 2017	Memphis	United States	FedExForum	Dua; Lipa	14,815 / 14,815	$1,597,428
September 19, 2017	Louisville	United States	KFC Yum! Center	Dua; Lipa	18,176 / 18,176	$1,911,793
September 20, 2017	Columbus	United States	Schottenstein Center	Dua; Lipa	15,288 / 15,288	$1,718,528
September 22, 2017	New York City	United States	Madison Square Garden	Dua; Lipa	31,318 / 31,318	$4,120,197
September 23, 2017	New York City	United States	Madison Square Garden	Dua; Lipa	31,318 / 31,318	$4,120,197
September 26, 2017	Newark	United States	Prudential Center	Dua; Lipa	14,625 / 14,625	$1,820,526
September 27, 2017	Buffalo	United States	KeyBank Center	Dua; Lipa	15,984 / 15,984	$1,684,265
September 29, 2017	Washington, D.C.	United States	Capital One Arena	Dua; Lipa	31,847 / 31,847	$4,180,239
September 30, 2017	Washington, D.C.	United States	Capital One Arena	Dua; Lipa	31,847 / 31,847	$4,180,239
October 4, 2017	Brooklyn	United States	Barclays Center	Jorja Smith	15,370 / 15,370	$1,898,099
October 5, 2017	Uniondale	United States	Nassau Coliseum	Jorja Smith	13,052 / 13,052	$1,626,154
October 7, 2017	Boston	United States	TD Garden	Jorja Smith	28,839 / 28,839	$3,695,807
October 8, 2017	Boston	United States	TD Garden	Jorja Smith	28,839 / 28,839	$3,695,807
October 10, 2017	Philadelphia	United States	Wells Fargo Center	Jorja Smith	16,555 / 16,555	$2,086,312
October 12, 2017	Raleigh	United States	PNC Arena	Jorja Smith	15,541 / 15,541	$1,819,506
October 14, 2017	Orlando	United States	Amway Center	Jorja Smith	14,067 / 14,067	$1,532,415
October 15, 2017	Sunrise	United States	BB&T Center	Jorja Smith	15,012 / 15,012	$1,941,593
October 18, 2017	Miami	United States	American Airlines Arena	Jorja Smith	15,190 / 15,190	$2,036,300
October 19, 2017	Tampa	United States	Amalie Arena	Jorja Smith	15,494 / 15,494	$1,737,059
October 21, 2017	New Orleans	United States	Smoothie King Center	Jorja Smith	15,056 / 15,056	$1,656,475
October 22, 2017	North Little Rock	United States	Verizon Arena	Jorja Smith	15,806 / 15,806	$1,573,424
October 24, 2017	Houston	United States	Toyota Center	Jorja Smith	13,529 / 13,529	$1,805,759
October 25, 2017	San Antonio	United States	AT&T Center	Jorja Smith	15,710 / 15,710	$1,751,972
October 27, 2017	Dallas	United States	American Airlines Center	Jorja Smith	14,879 / 14,879	$1,744,937
November 2, 2017	Fresno	United States	Save Mart Center	Jorja Smith	12,730 / 12,730	$1,427,143
November 3, 2017	Oakland	United States	Oracle Arena	Jorja Smith	15,884 / 15,884	$1,981,559
November 5, 2017	Phoenix	United States	Talking Stick Resort Arena	Jorja Smith	14,764 / 14,764	$1,651,992
November 7, 2017	Inglewood	United States	The Forum	Jorja Smith	61,893 / 61,893	$8,420,015
November 8, 2017	Inglewood	United States	The Forum	Jorja Smith	61,893 / 61,893	$8,420,015
November 10, 2017	Inglewood	United States	The Forum	Jorja Smith	61,893 / 61,893	$8,420,015
November 11, 2017	Inglewood	United States	The Forum	Jorja Smith	61,893 / 61,893	$8,420,015

Leg 3 – Latin America
Date	City	Country	Venue	Opening act	Attendance (Tickets sold / available)	Revenue
November 18, 2017	Rio de Janeiro	Brazil	Praça da Apoteose	DNCE	56,846 / 56,846	$4,473,215
November 19, 2017	Rio de Janeiro	Brazil	Praça da Apoteose	DNCE	56,846 / 56,846	$4,473,215
November 22, 2017	São Paulo	Brazil	Estádio do Morumbi	DNCE	83,437 / 83,437	$6,763,624
November 23, 2017	São Paulo	Brazil	Estádio do Morumbi	DNCE	83,437 / 83,437	$6,763,624
November 25, 2017	La Plata	Argentina	Estadio Ciudad de La Plata	DNCE	49,204 / 49,204	$5,060,415
November 28, 2017	Santiago	Chile	Estadio Nacional de Chile	DNCE	67,648 / 67,648	$6,026,346
November 30, 2017	Lima	Peru	Estadio Nacional del Perú	DNCE	41,493 / 41,493	$4,592,487
December 2, 2017	Quito	Ecuador	Estadio Olímpico Atahualpa	DNCE	31,295 / 31,295	$3,563,518
December 5, 2017	Bogotá	Colombia	Estadio El Campín	DNCE	40,468 / 40,468	$4,170,179
December 7, 2017	San José	Costa Rica	Estadio Nacional de Costa Rica	DNCE	38,052 / 38,052	$2,831,903
January 31, 2018	Monterrey	Mexico	Estadio Universitario	Bebe Rexha	27,553 / 35,612	$2,974,523
February 2, 2018	Mexico City	Mexico	Foro Sol	Bebe Rexha; Nick Jonas	115,147 / 116,260	$8,784,453
February 3, 2018	Mexico City	Mexico	Foro Sol	Bebe Rexha; Nick Jonas	115,147 / 116,260	$8,784,453
February 5, 2018	Zapopan	Mexico	Estadio Akron	Bebe Rexha; Nick Jonas	36,289 / 39,846	$4,037,371

Leg 4 – Oceania
Date	City	Country	Venue	Opening act	Attendance (Tickets sold / available)	Revenue
February 27, 2018	Auckland	New Zealand	Spark Arena	Dua; Lipa	48,785 / 48,785	$5,261,050
February 28, 2018	Auckland	New Zealand	Spark Arena	Dua; Lipa	48,785 / 48,785	$5,261,050
March 2, 2018	Auckland	New Zealand	Spark Arena	Dua; Lipa	48,785 / 48,785	$5,261,050
March 3, 2018	Auckland	New Zealand	Spark Arena	Dua; Lipa	48,785 / 48,785	$5,261,050
March 7, 2018	Melbourne	Australia	Rod Laver Arena	Dua; Lipa	57,842 / 57,842	$6,560,280
March 8, 2018	Melbourne	Australia	Rod Laver Arena	Dua; Lipa	57,842 / 57,842	$6,560,280
March 10, 2018	Melbourne	Australia	Rod Laver Arena	Dua; Lipa	57,842 / 57,842	$6,560,280
March 11, 2018	Melbourne	Australia	Rod Laver Arena	Dua; Lipa	57,842 / 57,842	$6,560,280
March 14, 2018	Brisbane	Australia	Brisbane Entertainment Centre	DJ Leggo; My Fueggo	27,094 / 27,094	$3,058,400
March 15, 2018	Brisbane	Australia	Brisbane Entertainment Centre	DJ Leggo; My Fueggo	27,094 / 27,094	$3,058,400
March 17, 2018	Sydney	Australia	Qudos Bank Arena	DJ Leggo; My Fueggo	88,592 / 88,592	$9,217,950
March 18, 2018	Sydney	Australia	Qudos Bank Arena	DJ Leggo; My Fueggo	88,592 / 88,592	$9,217,950
March 20, 2018	Sydney	Australia	Qudos Bank Arena	Dua; Lipa	88,592 / 88,592	$9,217,950
March 23, 2018	Sydney	Australia	Qudos Bank Arena	Dua; Lipa	88,592 / 88,592	$9,217,950
March 24, 2018	Sydney	Australia	Qudos Bank Arena	Dua; Lipa	88,592 / 88,592	$9,217,950
March 26, 2018	Adelaide	Australia	Adelaide Entertainment Centre	Dua; Lipa	9,930 / 9,930	$1,020,470
March 28, 2018	Perth	Australia	Perth Arena	Dua; Lipa	29,434 / 29,434	$3,436,710
March 29, 2018	Perth	Australia	Perth Arena	Dua; Lipa	29,434 / 29,434	$3,436,710

Leg 5 – Asia
Date	City	Country	Venue	Opening act	Attendance (Tickets sold / available)	Revenue
April 11, 2018	Saitama	Japan	Saitama Super Arena	N/A Jabbawockeez (Manila Only)	90,672 / 90,672	$15,531,450
April 12, 2018	Saitama	Japan	Saitama Super Arena	N/A Jabbawockeez (Manila Only)	90,672 / 90,672	$15,531,450
April 14, 2018	Saitama	Japan	Saitama Super Arena	N/A Jabbawockeez (Manila Only)	90,672 / 90,672	$15,531,450
April 15, 2018	Saitama	Japan	Saitama Super Arena	N/A Jabbawockeez (Manila Only)	90,672 / 90,672	$15,531,450
April 17, 2018	Taipei	Taiwan	Nangang Exhibition Center	N/A Jabbawockeez (Manila Only)	20,020 / 20,020	$3,273,545
April 20, 2018	Shanghai	China	Mercedes-Benz Arena	N/A Jabbawockeez (Manila Only)	35,564 / 35,564	$5,932,991
April 21, 2018	Shanghai	China	Mercedes-Benz Arena	N/A Jabbawockeez (Manila Only)	35,564 / 35,564	$5,932,991
April 23, 2018	Shanghai	China	Mercedes-Benz Arena	N/A Jabbawockeez (Manila Only)	35,564 / 35,564	$5,932,991
April 27, 2018	Macau		Cotai Arena	N/A Jabbawockeez (Manila Only)	23,861 / 23,861	$4,131,652
April 28, 2018	Macau		Cotai Arena	N/A Jabbawockeez (Manila Only)	23,861 / 23,861	$4,131,652
April 30, 2018	Bangkok	Thailand	IMPACT Arena	N/A Jabbawockeez (Manila Only)	21,607 / 21,607	$4,311,275
May 1, 2018	Bangkok	Thailand	IMPACT Arena	N/A Jabbawockeez (Manila Only)	21,607 / 21,607	$4,311,275
May 3, 2018	Pasay	Philippines	Mall of Asia Arena	N/A Jabbawockeez (Manila Only)	23,890 / 23,890	$4,411,425
May 4, 2018	Pasay	Philippines	Mall of Asia Arena	N/A Jabbawockeez (Manila Only)	23,890 / 23,890	$4,411,425
May 6, 2018	Singapore		Singapore Indoor Stadium	N/A Jabbawockeez (Manila Only)	22,992 / 22,992	$4,516,851
May 7, 2018	Singapore		Singapore Indoor Stadium	N/A Jabbawockeez (Manila Only)	22,992 / 22,992	$4,516,851
May 9, 2018	Kuala Lumpur	Malaysia	Axiata Arena	N/A Jabbawockeez (Manila Only)	11,065 / 11,065	$1,819,083
May 12, 2018	Hong Kong		AsiaWorld–Arena	N/A Jabbawockeez (Manila Only)	27,847 / 27,847	$4,814,281
May 13, 2018	Hong Kong		AsiaWorld–Arena	N/A Jabbawockeez (Manila Only)	27,847 / 27,847	$4,814,281

Leg 6 – North America
	City	Country	Venue	Opening act	Attendance (Tickets sold / available)	Revenue
May 27, 2018 (Note: The concert on May 27, 2018, in Napa was part of the BittleRock Napa Valley Festival)	Napa	United States	BottleRock Napa Valley	N/A		

Leg 7 – Europe and Africa
Date	City	Country	Venue	Opening act	Attendance (Tickets sold / available)	Revenue
June 16, 2018 (Note: The concert on June 16, 2018, at Werchter Boutique in Werchter was part of the Park Werchter festival.)	Werchter	Belgium	Festivalpark Werchter	DJ Rashida; Lil' Kleine	N/A	N/A
June 17, 2018 (Note: The concert on June 17, 2018, at Megaland in Landgraaf was part of the Pinkpop Festival.)	Langraaf	Netherlands	Megaland Landgraaf	DJ Rashida	N/A	N/A
June 20, 2018	Barcelona	Spain	Estadi Olímpic Lluís Companys	DJ Rashida; DNCE	N/A	N/A
June 22, 2018	Madrid	Spain	Wanda Metropolitano	DJ Rashida; DNCE	N/A	N/A
June 24, 2018 (Note: The concert on June 24, 2018, at Parque da Bela Vista in Lisbon was part of the Rock in Rio festival.)	Lisbon	Portugal	Parque da Bela Vista	DJ Rashida; Demi Lovato; Anitta; Agir	N/A	N/A
June 27, 2018 (Note: The concert on June 27, 2018, at OLM Souissi in Rabat was part of the Mawazine festival.)	Rabat	Morocco	OLM Souissi	DJ Rashida	N/A	N/A
June 30, 2018	Saint-Denis	France	Stade de France	DJ Rashida; DNCE	N/A	N/A
July 3, 2018	Bergen	Norway	Bergenhus Fortress	DJ Rashida	N/A	N/A
July 5, 2018 (Note: The concert on July 5, 2018, at Animal Showgrounds in Roskilde was part of the Roskilde Festival.)	Roskilde	Denmark	Roskilde Festival	DJ Rashida	N/A	N/A
July 7, 2018 (Note: The concert on July 7, 2018, at Gdynia-Kosakowo Airport in Gdynia was part of the Open'er Festival.)	Gdynia	Poland	Gdynia-Kosakowo Airport	DJ Rashida	N/A	N/A
July 10, 2018	Glasgow	Scotland	Glasgow Green	DJ Rashida; Dua Lipa; Average White Band; DNCE	N/A	N/A
July 12, 2018	Dublin	Ireland	Marlay Park	Sister Sledge; DJ Rashida; DNCE	N/A	N/A
July 14, 2018 (Note: The concert on July 14, 2018, at Hyde Park in London was part of the British Summer Time festival.)	London	England	Hyde Park	Khalid; DNCE; Charlie Wilson; Alex Hepburn; DJ Rashida	N/A	N/A

Leg 8 – North America
Date	City	Country	Venue	Opening act	Attendance (Tickets sold / available)	Revenue
August 3, 2018 (Note: The concert of August 3, 2018, at Grant Park in Chicago was part of Lollapalooza festival.)	Chicago	United States	Grant Park	N/A		
September 7, 2018 (Note: The show on September 7, 2018, in Denver at the Pepsi Center was originally scheduled for October 30, 2017, but was postponed due to Mars' sinus infection.)	Denver	United States	Pepsi Center	Boyz II Men; DJ Rashida	28,390 / 30,548	$3,783,277
September 8, 2018	Denver	United States	Pepsi Center	Boyz II Men; DJ Rashida	28,390 / 30,548	$3,783,277
September 11, 2018	Saint Paul	United States	Xcel Energy Center	Charlie Wilson; DJ Rashida	28,608 / 31,669	$3,758,907
September 12, 2018	Saint Paul	United States	Xcel Energy Center	Charlie Wilson; DJ Rashida	28,608 / 31,669	$3,758,907
September 15, 2018	Detroit	United States	Little Caesars Arena	Charlie Wilson; DJ Rashida	29,275 / 29,275	$3,969,773
September 16, 2018	Detroit	United States	Little Caesars Arena	Charlie Wilson; DJ Rashida	29,275 / 29,275	$3,969,773
September 19, 2018	Philadelphia	United States	Wells Fargo Center	Boyz II Men; DJ Rashida	27,880 / 27,880	$3,785,007
September 20, 2018	Philadelphia	United States	Wells Fargo Center	Boyz II Men; DJ Rashida	27,880 / 27,880	$3,785,007
September 22, 2018	Toronto	Canada	Scotiabank Arena	Ciara; DJ Rashida	33,176 / 33,176	$4,146,958
September 23, 2018	Toronto	Canada	Scotiabank Arena	Ciara; DJ Rashida	33,176 / 33,176	$4,146,958
September 27, 2018	Boston	United States	TD Garden	Ciara; DJ Rashida	26,684 / 26,843	$4,126,750
September 28, 2018	Boston	United States	TD Garden	Ciara; DJ Rashida	26,684 / 26,843	$4,126,750
October 1, 2018	Newark	United States	Prudential Center	Ciara; DJ Rashida	24,902 / 24,902	$4,072,592
October 2, 2018	Newark	United States	Prudential Center	Ciara; DJ Rashida	24,902 / 24,902	$4,072,592
October 4, 2018	Brooklyn	United States	Barclays Center	Ella Mai; DJ Rashida	29,966 / 29,966	$5,138,161
October 5, 2018	Brooklyn	United States	Barclays Center	Ella Mai; DJ Rashida	29,966 / 29,966	$5,138,161
October 7, 2018	Nashville	United States	Bridgestone Arena	Ella Mai; DJ Rashida	29,244 / 29,244	$4,367,352
October 8, 2018	Nashville	United States	Bridgestone Arena	Ella Mai; DJ Rashida	29,244 / 29,244	$4,367,352
October 11, 2018	Tulsa	United States	BOK Center	Ella Mai; DJ Rashida	26,164 / 26,164	$3,544,411
October 12, 2018	Tulsa	United States	BOK Center	Ella Mai; DJ Rashida	26,164 / 26,164	$3,544,411
October 14, 2018	Dallas	United States	American Airlines Center	Charlie Wilson; DJ Rashida	27,933 / 29,161	$4,180,930
October 15, 2018	Dallas	United States	American Airlines Center	Charlie Wilson; DJ Rashida	27,933 / 29,161	$4,180,930
October 20, 2018 (Note: The concert on October 20, 2018, at Circuit of the Americas in Austin was part of the 2018 USGP Weekend.)	Austin	United States	Austin360 Amphitheater	N/A		
October 23, 2018	Los Angeles	United States	Staples Center	Boyz II Men; DJ Rashida	61,322 / 61,322	$9,113,210
October 24, 2018	Los Angeles	United States	Staples Center	Ciara; DJ Rashida	61,322 / 61,322	$9,113,210
October 26, 2018	Los Angeles	United States	Staples Center	Ella Mai; DJ Rashida	61,322 / 61,322	$9,113,210
October 27, 2018	Los Angeles	United States	Staples Center	Charlie Wilson; DJ Rashida	61,322 / 61,322	$9,113,210
November 8, 2018	Honolulu	United States	Aloha Stadium	Charlie Wilson	113,751 / 113,751	$12,394,580
November 10, 2018	Honolulu	United States	Aloha Stadium	The Green; Common Kings	113,751 / 113,751	$12,394,580
November 11, 2018	Honolulu	United States	Aloha Stadium	The Green; Common Kings	113,751 / 113,751	$12,394,580
December 30, 2018	Las Vegas	United States	T-Mobile Arena	Boyz II Men	30,241 / 30,524	5,859,567
December 31, 2018	Las Vegas	United States	T-Mobile Arena	Boyz II Men	30,241 / 30,524	5,859,567
Totals					3,236,625 / 3,242,253	$361,814,865

Cancelled concerts
Date	City	Country	Venue	Reason
July 2, 2018	Düsseldorf	Germany	Esprit Arena	Logistical problems

== Personnel ==
The Hooligans

- Bruno Mars – vocals
- Philip Lawrence – backup vocals (2017–2018)
- Phredley Brown – lead guitar and backup vocals
- Jamareo Artis – bass guitar
- Eric Hernandez – drums
- Kameron Whalum – trombone and backup vocals
- Dwayne Dugger – saxophone and keyboard
- James King – trumpet and backup vocals
- John Fossitt – keyboards

Management

- Brian Bassham – stage manager
- Michele Bernstein – tour marketing executive, for William Morris Endeavor (WME)
- Brian Cohen – Tony Goldring 51
- Move Concerts – production (at least in Brazil)
- Michael Coppel – chairman, Live Nation Australia
- Joel Forman – production manager
- Shaun Hoffman – tour manager
- John Marx – personal management, for William Morris Endeavor (WME)
- Live Nation – production
- Live Music Rocks – promoter (at least in Brazil)
- Phil Rodriguez – CEO, move Concerts

Sound and monitor production

- Jacob Caples – technician (2018–present)
- Andrew Dowling – systems engineer/crew chief (2018–present)
- Andrea Espinoza – technician (2017–2018)
- Matthew Gallagher – technician (2018–present)
- Scotty McGrath – audio engineer
- Ramon Morales – monitor engineer
- Chris Rabold – FOH engineer
- Bill Sheppell – FOH engineer (2018–present)
- Chris "Sully" Sullivan – systems engineer/crew chief
- Robert "Bobby" Taylor III –technician (2017–2018)
- Paul Tobey – RF technician

Stage production

- John Arrowsmith – pyro tech shooter, crew chief
- LeRoy Bennett – production, lighting designer
- Paul Brackett – carpenter
- Brian Bukovinsky – lighting tech
- Christopher Butterfield – automation
- Darren D'Amour – pyro tech
- Stave Davidson – rigger
- Lashard Davis – carpenter
- Libby Dostart – production coordinator
- Steve Fatone – video director
- Cory FitzGerald – co-lighting designer, programmer
- Stan Fruge – automation operator, crew chief
- Jeff Goldsmith – carpenter
- James Harrelson Jr. – rigger
- Kiel Heerding – automation
- Whitney Hoversten – lighting director, programmer
- Kurt Jenks – carpenters head
- Mark Jones – pyro tech
- Chris Lanning – dimmer tech
- Christian Lind – video tech
- Ryan LeComte – dimmer tech
- Kenn MacDonald – laser tech
- Kevin McConville – automation
- Dan McLaughlin – automation
- Dave Medrano – carpenter
- Carlos Oldigs – master electrician
- Taylor Pesqueira – production assistant
- Josh Phebus – video tech
- Thomas Poje – lighting tech
- Doscher Shewmake – carpenter
- Lee Shull – video tech
- Krystena Rice – video crew chief
- Jerry Ritter – riggers head
- Eric Taylor – laser tech operator
- Kevin Tokunaga –video tech engineer
- Soline Velazquez – lighting crew chief
- Angelo Viacava – lighting tech

== See also ==
- List of fastest-selling concert tours
