= Bruno Mars: 24K Magic Live at the Apollo =

2017 TV special

- Promotional poster
- Directed by: Chris Howie
- Starring: Bruno Mars
- Country of origin: United States
- Original language: English

Production
- Executive producers: Fulwell 73 Productions; Ben Winston; Bruno Mars
- Production locations: Apollo Theater, Harlem, New York City
- Running time: 60 minutes

Original release
- Network: CBS
- Release: November 29, 2017

Bruno Mars: 24K Magic Live at the Apollo was a television special starring American singer-songwriter Bruno Mars performing live at the Apollo Theater in Harlem, New York City. It was produced by Fulwell 73 Productions and co-produced by Ben Winston, Mars and Julie Greenwald. Aired on November 29, 2017, the show depicts Mars and his band, the Hooligans, interacting with locals intercut with a performance of most of Mars's third studio album, 24K Magic (2016). The special had previously begun at Apollo's marquee with a performance of the album's title song.

The television special was received positively by reviewers; some praised the energy of the live performances while others complimented Mars's vocals throughout the entire show. Bruno Mars: 24K Magic Live at the Apollo was first released on Blu-ray in Japan on April 11, 2018, through Warner Music Japan as part of the 24K Magic deluxe edition. The program, broadcast twice, attracted approximately 9.76 million viewers. It was nominated in the category of Outstanding Music Direction at the 70th Primetime Creative Arts Emmy Awards, and for Outstanding Variety Show – Series or Special at the 50th NAACP Image Awards.

== Background and release ==
In September 2017, American entertainment magazine Us Weekly revealed there were plans for a television special by Bruno Mars at the Apollo Theater in New York City. Mars had already hinted at the upcoming availability of tickets to a "secret New York Show" and posted video clips showing him on top of Apollo's marquee performing the singles "24K Magic" (2016) and "That's What I Like" (2017). Bruno Mars: 24K Magic Live at the Apollo was ultimately confirmed. On November 20, 2017, Mars shared a trailer for the show depicting him and his bandmates—The Hooligans—interacting and greeting locals, working in a kitchen and performing on top of Apollo Theater's marquee.

During an interview with Yahoo TV, Mars said that the marquee performance almost did not happen since a street had to be blocked entirely and several safety requirements to be complied with. He further confessed that only at this point in his career he had felt prepared to face the "brutal audience at the Apollo", as it had previously shown "rejection of other artists" at another live event, Amateur Night at the Apollo. He chose the Apollo Theater because it was a "magical place" for him given its "rich history in music and pop culture".

CBS and Atlantic Records partnered with Mars to premiere his first television special. The program was produced by Fulwell 73 Productions, with Mars and Ben Winston serving as executive producers. Chris Howie directed it, while Carly Shackleton was the supervising producer, Lou Fox served as the line producer and Jez Breadin was in charge of floor production. Julie Greenwald was a co-executive producer and Leo-Perman was in charge of the executive production. David Dieckman and Craig Anderson were the video encoding and menu design authors for Craigman Digital.

The one-hour Bruno Mars: 24K Magic Live at the Apollo was aired on CBS on November 29, 2017 from 10–11:00 PM (ET/PT) to a viewership of 5.36 million. An eventual January 26, 2018 rebroadcast attracted 4.4 million viewers. The deluxe edition of 24K Magic includes a one-disc Blu-ray featuring the television special performance at the Apollo Theater. It was first released in Japan on April 11, 2018 by Warner Music Japan, and then eventually issued in several other territories by Atlantic Records. A 144-page hardcover book titled Bruno Mars Live at the Apollo was also published, containing photographs of Mars and the Hooligans at the concert, behind-the-scenes shots, and other previously unreleased footage shot by Florent Dechard. It was first announced, on April 21, 2020, the stream of the television special during the PlayOn virtual festival, along with performances from other artists. The proceeds raised from donations and merchandise sales were to support the COVID-19 Solidarity Response Fund for the World Health Organization. This was a response to the COVID-19 pandemic.

== Synopsis ==
The show starts with footage of Mars and the Hooligans walking on the streets, talking, shaking hands, entering beauty salons, having conversations and inviting people to attend the concert at the Apollo Theater. Mars begins performing "24K Magic" atop the Apollo Theater's marquee after traffic had been stopped on 125th Street. This is intercut with Mars and the Hooligans singing on the streets, visiting and having fun with the locals in Harlem in euphoric and affectionate moments. The show continues inside the theater, commencing with Mars saying: "All I wanna do is have some fun with you".

Mars subsequently performs several songs from his third studio album, 24K Magic (2016), including "Finesse", "Perm", "Chunky", "Calling All My Lovelies" and "Versace on the Floor". Before the last song is performed, footage of the singer and his band eating at Sylvia's Soul Food is shown. There, they interrupt their meal to cover Jackie Wilson's "(Your Love Keeps Lifting Me) Higher and Higher" (1967), while several tourists clap along with the music. Mars wishes everyone "Goodnight!" and throws his microphone on the floor, taking a chicken thigh from a table. "Uptown Funk" closes the setlist, having Mars in a "dark-pink smoking jacket" alongside a black neckband collar and a hat with a small feather.

== Critical response and accolades ==
The television special received positive response from reviewers. Rap-Up called the performance of "24K Magic" on top of the Apollo marquee "show-stopping" and dubbed the setlist as "electrifying". Amanda Petrusich, writing for The New Yorker, praised Mars's performance of "Versace on the Floor", saying "[...] [its] strength [...] was undeniable". Petrusich also complimented Mars's vocals on his Jackie Wilson cover: "[he] sounded terrific—his voice is golden, rich, unwavering." In 2018, Bruno Mars: 24K Magic Live at the Apollo was nominated in the category of Outstanding Music Direction at the 70th Primetime Creative Arts Emmy Awards, as well as for Outstanding Variety Show – Series or Special at the 50th NAACP Image Awards in 2019.

== Track listing ==
- 24K Magic Blu-ray
1. "Good Morning Harlem"
2. "24K Magic"
3. "Finesse"
4. "Perm"
5. "Chess in Harlem"
6. "Calling All My Lovelies"
7. "Chunky"
8. "Treasure"
9. "That's What I Like"
10. "Straight Up & Down"
11. "Versace on the Floor"
12. "Sylvia's Soul Food"
13. "Uptown Funk"
14. "Credits"

== Personnel ==
Credits adapted from the liner notes of the 24K Magic deluxe edition and Vibe.

The Hooligans – Band members

- Bruno Mars – lead vocals, guitar, executive producer
- Jamareo Artis – bass guitar
- Phredley Brown – lead guitar, backing vocals
- Dwayne Dugger – saxophone
- John Fossit – keyboard
- Eric Hernandez – drums
- James King – trumpet
- Philip Lawrence – backing vocals
- Kameron Whalum – trombone

Production

- Craig Anderson – menu design for Craigman Digital
- Jez Breadin – floor producer
- David Dieckman – video enconding for Craigman Digital
- Lou Fox – line producer
- Julie Greenwald – co-executive producer
- Chris Howie – director
- Leo Perman – executive production
- Carly Shackleton – supervising producer
- Ben Winston – executive producer

== Release history ==
Release dates
Region	Date	Label	Ref.
Japan	April 11, 2018	Warner Music Japan	
France	June 29, 2018	Atlantic Records	
Germany	June 29, 2018	Atlantic Records	
Spain	June 29, 2018	Atlantic Records	
United Kingdom	July 6, 2018	Atlantic Records	
Australia	July 13, 2018	Atlantic Records	
