= Versace on the Floor =

2017 single by Bruno Mars

Single by Bruno Mars

from the album 24K Magic
- Released: June 12, 2017
- Studio: Glenwood Place (Burbank, California)
- Genre: R&B
- Length: 4:21
- Label: Atlantic
- Songwriters: Bruno Mars; Philip Lawrence; Christopher Brody Brown; James Fauntleroy
- Producers: Shampoo Press & Curl

Bruno Mars singles chronology
"That's What I Like" (2017)	"Versace on the Floor" (2017)	"Chunky" (2017)

Music video
- "Versace on the Floor" on YouTube

"Versace on the Floor" is a song by American singer Bruno Mars from his third studio album, 24K Magic (2016). Atlantic Records released the song as the only promotional single and the third official single from the album to Hot AC radio in the United States on June 12, 2017. "Versace on the Floor" was written by Mars, Philip Lawrence, Christopher Brody Brown and James Fauntleroy. Mars, Lawrence and Brown handled the track's production under the name Shampoo Press & Curl. A remix by French DJ David Guetta was released on June 27, 2017, for digital download and streaming in various countries. "Versace on the Floor" is a retro-styled R&B song reminiscent of the slow jams from the 1990s, and resembles the early works of Michael Jackson. The song's lyrics address romance, intimacy and Gianni Versace's clothing line.

Music critics considered it to be the soundtrack to school dances, others found its lyrics sexually driven. The song charted moderately in various countries. It reached number 33 on the U.S. Billboard Hot 100 and number seven on the Dance Club Songs chart. It peaked at number 27 in New Zealand, and reached the top three on the Philippine Hot 100. Its remix peaked at number eight and 13 on the singles charts in Belgium (Wallonia) and Hungary, respectively. It is certified double platinum by the Recording Industry Association of America (RIAA) and Australian Recording Industry Association (ARIA) and quadruple platinum by both Music Canada (MC) and Recorded Music NZ (RMNZ).

The song's music video, directed by Cameron Duddy and Mars, was released on August 13, 2017, and features American actress and singer Zendaya. Mars performed "Versace on the Floor" during the 2017 Billboard Music Awards, the 24K Magic World Tour (2017–2018) and the Bruno Mars Live tour (2020-2022). The song was nominated for The Ashford & Simpson Songwriter's Award at the 2017 Soul Train Music Awards.

== Background and development ==
In September 2014, Bruno Mars hinted he was working on new music with the tweet "Now it's time to start writing chapter 3". Following the release of the successful Mark Ronson and Mars's single "Uptown Funk" (2014), Mars headed to the studio to record more songs, and said he had no plans to release a new album "until it's done". It was due in March 2016, but his appearance at the Super Bowl half-time show postponed it for several months. At the time, seven songs were already recorded.

During an interview with Rolling Stone magazine, Mars explained there were six different versions of "Versace on the Floor". He played the original demo of the track for the interviewer, calling it the "poolside version" with a piña colada" vibe. Mars tells a girl they can "fly through a storm on a unicorn ... Make love on a mountain, bathe in a fountain". However, since he did not want the song to have a poolside vibe, he and his team remixed the track. The new version had the same lyrics, but a "more epic musical track". According to Mars, this version was set to be on the album, however, "something" was bothering him. "We're painting this picture ... I'm promising the world. But I'm not singing. This is supposed to be a big ballad on the album, but I'm not giving it to 'em! If we're gonna really, dramatically slow things down, I've got to be singing some shit." At this point, the team decided to work on a new melody and lyrics. The final version sounds like a "Boyz II Men–ish anthem that climaxes with an indelible hook". According to Mars, the final recording is the 12th version.

In November 2017, Mars was a guest on the Charlie Rose Show. He said the way he dressed and looked when he went into the studio could affect his creativity. For the recording of "Versace on the Floor" Mars and his production team decided to compete to see who could be the "flyest" coming to the studio. Mars arrived wearing a Versace jacket, which made him feel "fancy" and wanting to "have some silky Versace sex". Both Italian fashion house Versace and designer Donatella Versace, who has dressed the singer, inspired the song.

=== David Guetta remix ===
"Versace on the Floor"

Single by Bruno Mars vs. David Guetta
- Released: June 27, 2017
- Genre: Funk
- Length: 3:48
- Label: Atlantic
- Songwriters: Bruno Mars; Philip Lawrence; Christopher Brody Brown; James Fauntleroy; David Guetta; Giorgio Tuinfort
- Producers: Shampoo Press & Curl; Guetta; Tuinfort

David Guetta singles chronology
"2U" (2017)	"Versace on the Floor" (remix) (2017)	"Complicated" (2017)

Two weeks after the release of the original version as a single, Atlantic Records issued a remix by French DJ David Guetta, officially titled: Bruno Mars vs. David Guetta – "Versace on the Floor". Guetta premiered the track during a live show at Ushuaïa Ibiza a day before the official release of the remix on digital and streaming platforms. During the live show, Guetta affirmed "it's a little different from what I usually play here, it's a little softer".

Guetta was grateful for the opportunity to work with Mars on "Versace on the Floor". He said the track was not only a remix but also a "collaboration and combination of different worlds together". He wanted to make it more danceable and "DJ friendly", respecting the music Mars created without changing his vocal. He aimed to create a song "that speaks to a wide audience". Guetta used the original version of the song to create his remix. It took him two weeks to finish. He played it for Mars, who enjoyed the remixed version and decided to send it to radio stations.

Guetta produced the song, music and instrument programming with Giorgio Tuinfort. They were also credited as songwriters. Tuinfort, Marcel Schimmscheimer, and Pierre-Luc Rioux played the piano, bass and guitar, respectively. Jeroen De Rijk was responsible for the percussion. A 16-piece orchestra was also used. (Note: The orchestra included: Anna Pelser, Annelieke Marselje, Ben Mathot, David Faber, Diewertje Wanders, Douwe Nauta, Franck van der Heijden, Ian Jong, Judith van Driel, Loes Dooren, Marije de Jong, Marleen Wester, Riciotti Ensemble, Saskia Peters, Sofie van der Pol and Tseroeja van den Bos.) Bosko provided the vocals on the talk box. Additional recording was done by Paul Power, while Daddy's Groove mixed and mastered Guetta's version.

== Release and production ==
"Versace on the Floor" was released as a promotional single from 24K Magic, on November 4, 2016, on Spotify and iTunes. It was thought that the record was scheduled to be the second single from the album. However, in early January, AllAccess revealed "That's What I Like" was being sent to Top 40 radio stations as the second single. "Versace on the Floor" was released on June 12, 2017, as the third single to adult contemporary, hot adult contemporary and modern adult contemporary radio stations. It was issued a day later to American contemporary hit radio and rhythmic contemporary stations, via Atlantic Records. On June 27, 2017, the official remix of the single by David Guetta was released on digital and streaming platforms by Atlantic, and via Warner Music for radio airplay in Italy.

"Versace on the Floor" was written by Mars, Philip Lawrence, Christopher Brody Brown and James Fauntleroy. Its production was handled by Mars, Lawrence and Brown under their alias, Shampoo Press & Curl. Greg Phillinganes played the keyboards; Mars, Fauntleroy, and Lawrence sang background vocals. The track was recorded and engineered by Charles Moniz with additional engineering assistance from Jacob Dennis at Glenwood Place Studios in Burbank, California. It was mixed at MixStar Studios in Virginia Beach by Serban Ghenea, with John Hanes serving as mixing engineer. Tom Coyne mastered the track at Sterling Sound, NYC.

== Composition ==
"Versace on the Floor"
A 24-second sample of "Versace on the Floor" where Mars sings the chorus.

"Versace on the Floor" is an R&B song inspired by the slow jams of the 1990s. However, some critics placed the song in the 1980s. It is based on a keyboard tone giving it a slower and deeper sound, like a "smooth power-ballad". Its instrumentation features "roller-rink" synthesizers which "sparkle and snap". It also includes a "breezy guitar". The song is performed in the key of D major with a tempo of 87 beats per minute. During the final chorus, it modulates into E♭ major. David Guetta's reworked version has a 1970s funk style with instrumentation featuring synths breakdowns, bass, retro synths and vocoded liners.

Mars initially sings tenderly, his voice ranging from a soprano to a falsetto. His vocals have been compared to the Stylistics's lead singer Russell Thompkins Jr., Ralph Tresvant and Michael Jackson. Further into the song the singer unleashes "the more forceful side of his voice". This is apparent in the song's composition as it transitions from a "smoky music-box vibe" to "a vibrant jungle ballad". Its production borrows from Selena's "Dreaming of You" (1995) and "Man in the Mirror" (1987) by Michael Jackson. "Versace on the Floor" is similar to the sound of New Edition, Freddie Jackson's "Rock Me Tonight (For Old Times Sake)" (1985) and the early works of Michael Jackson. Chris DeVille of Stereogum said it was Boyz II Men's "I'll Make Love to You" "repurposed" for the Dirty Dancing soundtrack, describing it as "a power ballad rising to Valhalla from a soft bed of Casios". The single also has "Prince-like flourishes and frills".

Lyrically, it shows Mars's romantic side, with "champagne flutes", rose petals, dancing and getting intimate with his beloved. "Philly soul bands" and Marvin Gaye's "Sexual Healing" inspire the lyrics. It also shows Mars's attraction to the Gianni Versace clothing line as he "belts out his dreams of high-rolling seduction". Will Robinson of Entertainment Weekly compared the track to Mars's "When I Was Your Man" (2012), but felt that "Versace on the Floor" is "less wistful and more romantic and steamier". Its lyrics have also been described as a sultry and sexy affair. On February 27, 2019, West Java's Indonesian Broadcasting Commission placed a ban on the daytime radio broadcast of several songs including "Versace on the Floor", due to their adult, offensive or obscene lyrics.

== Critical reception ==
"Versace on the Floor" received positive to mixed reviews from most music critics. Chris Gayomali and Max Berlinger of GQ praised the track for its throwback sound and highlighted the song's sexual lyrics. Gayomali described it as a "legitimate fuckjam and an old Shanice song", that would fit the Beverly Hills 90210 soundtrack. Berlinger felt it was "the ultimate slow-jam". Andrew Unterberger, writing for Billboard, called the song a "show-stopping 24K Magic centerpiece". Jackie Willis of Entertainment Tonight felt the single gave Boyz II Men "a run for their money!". Willis called the lyrics "super sultry and sexy". Vibe magazine's Desire Thompson complimented the lyrics for being "seductive". Sasha Geffen of MTV News and Nick Levine from NME shared that the song is reminiscent of school dances. Geffen also felt the track was "smooth". Mike Wass of Idolator enjoyed the track, noting it is inspired by the soul music of the 1970s and 1980s, and describing it as "a cross between Atlantic Starr and the Commodores". Anna Tingley of Billboard considered the song "catchy". Roling Stone's Maura Johnston said Mars brought "the glossy slow jams that ruled R&B radio in the Eighties to the social media age, this sexed-up cut has sonics as luxe". In a mixed review, Patrick Ryan of USA Today felt that "Versace on the Floor" is an excessively sentimental track as it counterbalances the other lavish songs on the album. Las Vegas Weekly's Mike Pizzo dubbed the track as "embarrassingly overproduced", saying that it sounds rather old than "old-school cool".

Reviewing Guetta's version Vibe's J'na Jefferson praised the remix for giving "new life" to the track. Idolator's Mike Wass affirmed that Guetta was "faithful to the original's retro charm while tinkering with the sound here and there to make it more current". David Rishty, writing for Billboard, felt the Guetta remix elevated "the original record by a few notches". Jason Scott of PopDust said the remix should be "on repeat for all time". Scott added, "David Guetta injects his magical instincts into the Mars original".

The original version of "Versace on the Floor" was nominated for The Ashford & Simpson Songwriter's Award at the 2017 Soul Train Music Awards. A year later, Guetta's version won in "Remix of the Year - Radio Airplay" at the Remix Awards. In 2021, Daria Paterek writing for Impact included "Versace on the Floor" on her "list of the top 10 R&B songs that debuted in the 2010s". Paterek affirmed it "demonstrates Bruno Mars's ability to adapt and successfully develop as an artist."

== Commercial performance ==
"Versace on the Floor" was released as a promotional single and debuted on the charts at number 88 in France and number 96 in Portugal. When the 24K Magic album was released, the track debuted at number 98 in the United States on the Billboard Hot 100 chart and at number 73 on the Canadian Hot 100, the week of December 10, 2016, and at its peak position of number 27 in New Zealand. Around the same time, it peaked at number two in Israel.

Following its single release the song re-entered the Billboard Hot 100 and the Canadian Hot 100, peaking at number 33 and 43, respectively, spending 14 weeks on both charts. The track peaked at number seven on the Billboard Dance Club Songs. "Versace on the Floor" was certified double platinum by the Recording Industry Association of America (RIAA) and four times platinum by Music Canada (MC). It debut and peaked at number three on the Philippine Hot 100 on June 12, 2017.

On the UK Singles Chart the song peaked at number 59 and was certified gold by the British Phonographic Industry (BPI). In Italy it peaked at number 82 on the FIMI Singles Chart. "Versace on the Floor" was certified platinum by the Federazione Industria Musicale Italiana (FIMI).

The David Guetta remix charted in three other countries, Belgium, Hungary and Poland. It reached the top ten, peaking at number eight on the Ultratop 50 chart in Wallonia (Belgium), number 13 in Hungary and number 32 on the Polish Airplay Top 100. Its remix also helped the original version of "Versace on the Floor" to chart in Australia, debuting at number 57. The song was certified two times platinum by the Australian Recording Industry Association (ARIA) and four times platinum by the Recorded Music NZ.

== Music video ==
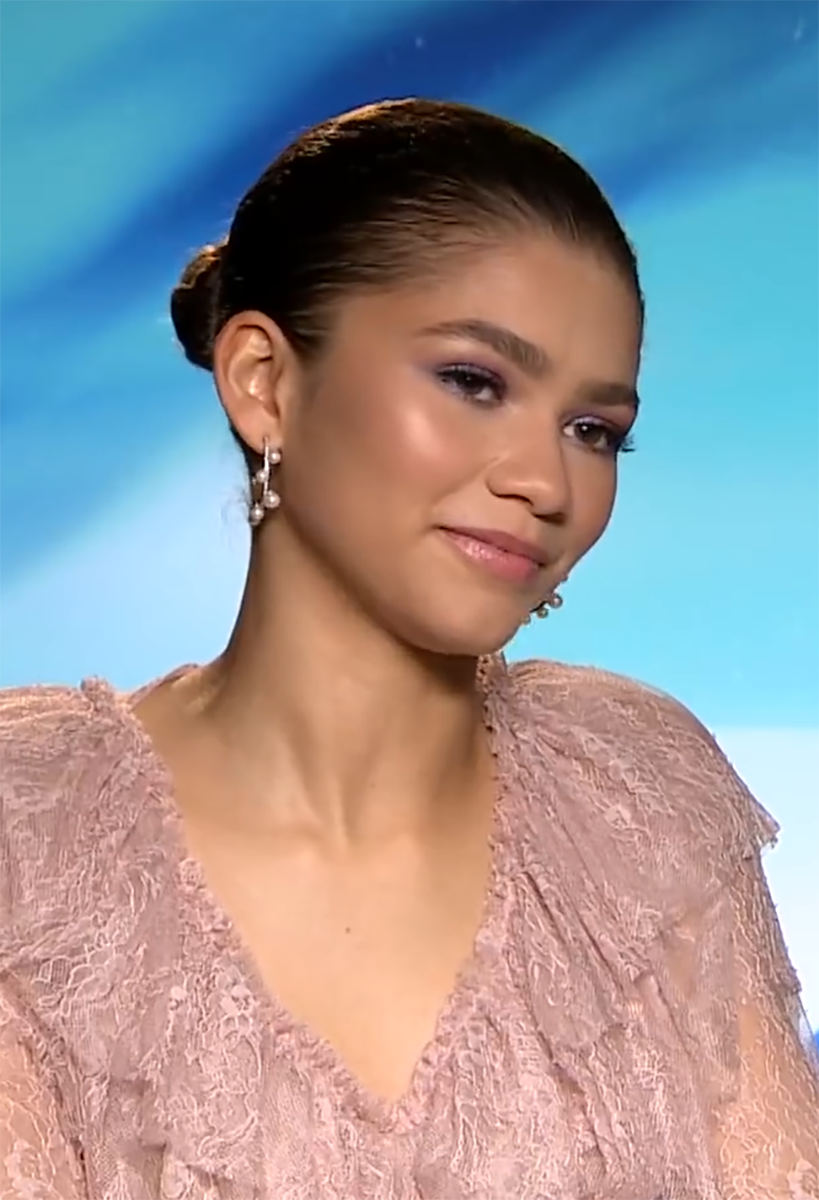
Zendaya appears in the video.

On August 13, 2017, Bruno Mars asked on Twitter: "What you thought I wasn't gonna shoot a video for this silky summer jam?" Later, he teased a short preview of the video at the 2017 Teen Choice Awards during his acceptance video after winning Teen Choice Visionary Award. During the ceremony, the music video for "Versace on the Floor", featuring American actress and singer Zendaya, directed by Cameron Duddy and Mars, premiered. Zendaya said she was asked by Mars to participate in the video.

In the video Mars and Zendaya exchange flirty glances in a hotel hallway before entering their respective rooms. They are both wearing custom Versace clothes. Mars is dressed in black pants, a short-sleeved silk button-down shirt, and smoking slippers with gold Medusa emblems, while Zendaya wears a gold chain mail mini-dress. There is a purple-toned haze in both rooms. Once Mars sits at a purple piano he begins to sing. His music has a magical effect on Zendaya who is next door. Becoming seduced by Mars's charm and the ballad, she goes crazy next to the wall. Later, her Versace dress unzips itself while she grooves to the music. The video ends with Zendaya's gown hitting the floor, followed by a knock on Mars's door.

To show her appreciation and friendship with Mars, designer Donatella Versace posted an Instagram video featuring the chorus of "Versace on the Floor". The video features several models, including Candice Swanepoel and Adrian Chabada, along with Versace herself. They lip-sync and dance in "extravagant clothes from the designer".

Ashley Iasimone of Billboard commented that Mars and Zendaya both dressed in Versace, calling the video "stylish and sensual". Mike Wass of Idolator found the music video to be worth the wait, adding it "has every chance of going viral". Vibe's Jessica McKinney felt the chemistry between Mars and Zendaya, "things got pretty steamy on set". Raisa Buner writing for Time dubbed the video "retro-glamorous" and praised it for having a "sensuous treatment" that fitted the song. Jennifer Drysdale of Entertainment Tonight called the video "sultry".

== Live performances ==
During The Late Late Show with James Corden on December 13, 2016, Mars included "Versace on the Floor" on the popular segment Carpool Karaoke. Nevertheless, its first televised performance was during the 2017 Billboard Music Awards, through a live stream from the 24K Magic World Tour, in Amsterdam. Mars wore an XXIV merch ball cap, a blazer and white sneakers and sang the track with his band. During his performance "Tetris-like blocks craned down" providing a visual with purple, blue and yellow colours. Laser lights appeared while Mars and two band members danced. At the end of the show, Mars was standing on top of a "Versace logo". Emily Yahr of The Washington Post felt Mars's performance was one of the five best moments of the night saying that his rendition "had more energy" than some people singing live in Vegas. Nick Williams, writing for Billboard, called it "electrifying" and found Mars's vocals to be "powerful" and "emotive". Brian Josephs of Spin and Lucas Villa of AXS praised the show and called it "glowing". Villa added, that Mars's vocals "shined". Time's Raisa Bruner criticized the inclusion of Mars's live performance calling it "unnecessary", saying it slowed the show and brought its energy down.

Mars performed the single at the Apollo Theater alongside the majority of the 24K Magic album for his CBS prime time special titled Bruno Mars: 24K Magic Live at the Apollo, which aired on November 29, 2017. "Versace on the Floor" was the ninth song on the set list of his third tour—24K Magic World Tour (2017–18). On June 27, 2017, David Guetta played the remix for the first time during a live show at Ushuaïa Ibiza, a day before the track's official release. Mars also performed the song during the Bruno Mars Live tour (2020-2022).

== Track listings ==
Digital download
No.	Title	Length
1.	"Versace on the Floor"	4:21

Digital download
No.	Title	Length
1.	"Versace on the Floor" (Bruno Mars vs. David Guetta)	3:48

== Personnel ==
Credits adapted from the liner notes of 24K Magic, and credits for the remix version are adapted from Tidal.

=== Original version ===
- Bruno Mars – lead vocals, songwriting, background vocals
- Philip Lawrence – songwriting, background vocals
- Christopher Brody Brown – songwriting
- James Fauntleroy – songwriting, background vocals
- Greg Phillinganes – keyboards
- Shampoo Press & Curl – production
- Charles Moniz – recording, engineering
- Jacob Dennis – engineering assistance
- Serban Ghenea – mixing
- John Hanes – mix engineering
- Tom Coyne – mastering

=== David Guetta remix ===
- David Guetta – performer, production, music, instrumentation programming
- Giorgio Tuinfort – production, music, instrumentation programming, piano
- Marcel Schimmscheimer – bass
- Pierre-Luc Rioux – guitar
- Anna Pelser, Annelieke Marselje, Ben Mathot, David Faber, Diewertje Wanders, Douwe Nauta, Franck Van der Heijden, Ian Jong, Judith van Driel, Loes Dooren, Marije de Jong, Marleen Wester, Riciotti Ensemble, Saskia Peters, Sofie van der Pol, Tseroeja van den Bos – orchestra
- Jeroen De Rijk – percussion
- Paul Power – additional recording
- Bosko – talkbox
- Daddy's Groove – mixing, mastering

== Charts ==
=== Weekly charts ===
List of chart positions
Chart (2016–2018)	Peak position
Argentina Airplay (Monitor Latino)	16
Australia (ARIA)	57
Belgium (Ultratip Bubbling Under Flanders) David Guetta remix	5
Belgium (Ultratop 50 Wallonia) David Guetta remix	8
Bolivia Airplay (Monitor Latino)	5
Canada Hot 100 (Billboard)	43
Canada AC (Billboard)	36
Canada CHR/Top 40 (Billboard)	30
Canada Hot AC (Billboard)	25
Colombia (National-Report)	80
Czech Republic Airplay (ČNS IFPI)	47
Ecuador (National-Report)	41
France (SNEP)	88
Hungary (Rádiós Top 40) David Guetta remix	22
Hungary (Single Top 40) David Guetta remix	13
Israel International Airplay (Media Forest)	2
Italy (FIMI)	82
Japan Hot 100 (Billboard)	64
Mexico (Billboard)	34
New Zealand (Recorded Music NZ)	27
Panama Airplay (Monitor Latino)	19
Philippines (Philippine Hot 100)	3
Poland Airplay (ZPAV) David Guetta remix	32
Portugal (AFP)	90
Scottish Singles Sales (Official Charts)	47
Slovakia Airplay (ČNS IFPI)	55
Slovenia Airplay (SloTop50)	48
South Korea International (Gaon)	18
UK Singles (Official Charts)	59
US Billboard Hot 100	33
US Adult Pop Airplay (Billboard)	16
US Dance Club Songs (Billboard)	7
US Hot R&B/Hip-Hop Songs (Billboard)	15
US Pop Airplay (Billboard)	19
US Rhythmic Airplay (Billboard)	14

List of chart position
Chart (2024)	Peak position
Singapore (RIAS)	9

List of chart positions
Chart (2026)	Peak position
Netherlands (Single Tip) David Guetta remix	16
Philippines (Philippines Hot 100)	66

=== Year-end charts ===
List of chart positions
Chart (2017)	Position
Argentina (Monitor Latino)	69
Belgium (Ultratop Wallonia)	69
Hungary (Rádiós Top 40)	86
Spain Airplay (PROMUSICAE)	48
US Hot R&B/Hip-Hop Songs (Billboard)	59

List of chart position
Chart (2018)	Position
Argentina (Monitor Latino)	89

== Certifications ==
List of certifications
Region	Certification	Certified units/sales
Australia (ARIA)	2× Platinum	140,000^{‡}
Canada (Music Canada)	4× Platinum	320,000^{‡}
Denmark (IFPI Danmark)	Platinum	90,000^{‡}
France (SNEP)	Gold	66,666^{‡}
Italy (FIMI)	Platinum	50,000^{‡}
New Zealand (RMNZ)	4× Platinum	120,000^{‡}
Poland (ZPAV)	Gold	25,000^{‡}
Portugal (AFP)	Platinum	10,000^{‡}
Spain (Promusicae)	Gold	30,000^{‡}
United Kingdom (BPI)	Platinum	600,000^{‡}
United States (RIAA)	2× Platinum	2,000,000^{‡}
^{‡} Sales+streaming figures based on certification alone.

== Release history ==
=== Promotional release ===
List of release history, showing region, date, format, version and label
Region	Date	Format	Version	Label	Ref.
Various	November 4, 2016	Digital download; streaming	Original	Atlantic	

=== Single release ===
List of release history, showing region(s), date(s), format(s), version(s) and label(s)
Region	Date	Format	Version	Label	Ref.
United States	June 12, 2017	Adult contemporary radio	Original	Atlantic	
United States	June 12, 2017	Hot adult contemporary radio	Original	Atlantic	
United States	June 12, 2017	Modern adult contemporary radio	Original	Atlantic	
United States	June 13, 2017	Contemporary hit radio	Original	Atlantic	
United States	June 13, 2017	Rhythmic contemporary	Original	Atlantic	
Various	June 27, 2017	Digital download; streaming	David Guetta Remix	Atlantic	
Italy	June 27, 2017	Radio airplay	David Guetta Remix	Warner Music Group	
