= DJ Rashida =

American DJ

Rashida Gonzalez Robinson (17 July 1980) better known as DJ Rashida, is an American DJ known for her fusion of hip-hop, funk, soul music, dancehall, house music, pop music and rock music. She has played in London, New York, Tokyo, Dubai, Ibiza, Sydney, Paris and Madrid.

== Career ==
DJ Rahisda got her first pair of turntables around 1998. After coming to the attention of Prince during a DJ set at a House of Blues venue in 2004, she worked extensively with the musician, opening his shows around the world as well as playing at his private parties and making television appearances with him.

Robinson was the on-set DJ for the first three seasons of MTV's Randy Jackson Presents America's Best Dance Crew. In 2012, President Barack Obama chose Robinson to be one of three "DJs for Obama," as part of his reelection campaign.

Robinson has been featured in Vogue Italia, People, Us Weekly, Essence, 944 Magazine, Vibe, Flaunt, Remix, and Dazed & Confused.
