= 24K Magic (album) =

2016 studio album by Bruno Mars

Studio album by Bruno Mars
- Released: November 18, 2016
- Recorded: 2015–2016
- Studio: Glenwood Place (Burbank, California)
- Genres: R&B; funk; pop; new jack swing
- Length: 33:28
- Label: Atlantic
- Producers: Emile Haynie; Jeff Bhasker; Shampoo Press & Curl; The Stereotypes

Bruno Mars chronology
Unorthodox Jukebox (2012)	24K Magic (2016)	An Evening with Silk Sonic (2021)

Singles from 24K Magic
- 1. "24K Magic" Released: October 7, 2016; 2. "That's What I Like" Released: January 30, 2017; 3. "Versace on the Floor" Released: June 13, 2017; 4. "Chunky" Released: November 29, 2017; 5. "Finesse" Released: January 4, 2018

24K Magic is the third studio album by the American singer-songwriter Bruno Mars. It was released by Atlantic Records on November 18, 2016. Mars reunited with Philip Lawrence and Christopher Brody Brown, who composed the album under their joint alias Shampoo Press & Curl. Mars enlisted new composers including the Stereotypes and James Fauntleroy. Recording sessions for 24K Magic took place between late 2015 and September 2016 at Glenwood Place Studios in Burbank, California.

Several critics said 24K Magic was crafted from elements of R&B, funk, pop, and new jack swing. Mars was inspired to create an album on which he could capture the sound of 1990s R&B, that he listened and danced to during his childhood. He wanted to make people dance and have the same enjoyment he had. The lyrics of 24K Magic explore themes similar to those of its predecessor, Unorthodox Jukebox (2012), including money and sex. According to Mars, although he was able to convince Atlantic Records of the album's sound, they were initially hesitant.

24K Magic debuted at number two on the Billboard 200 chart with first-week sales of 231,000 equivalent album units and became Mars's first number-one album on the US Top R&B/Hip-Hop Albums. It also peaked at number two in Canada, France, and New Zealand, and produced five singles: the title track, "That's What I Like", and "Finesse" (remix featuring Cardi B), which were commercially successful while "Versace on the Floor" charted moderately and "Chunky" had a limited release. "That's What I Like" reached number one on the Billboard Hot 100, becoming Mars's seventh number-one song in the United States, while "24K Magic" peaked at number one in New Zealand. The album sold five million units globally and was certified triple platinum by the Recording Industry Association of America (RIAA), five times platinum by Music Canada (MC), and seven times platinum by Recorded Music NZ (RMNZ).

Critical responses to 24K Magic were generally favorable; many reviewers noticed the change of style, focusing on R&B and the improvement on the production. Others criticized the detachment from the casual listener and the lack of "vulnerability" from his previous ballads. At the 2018 Grammy Awards 24K Magic won seven Grammy Awards, including Album of the Year and Best R&B Album, while the title track won Record of the Year and "That's What I Like" won Song of The Year at the same ceremony. Several publications listed the album as one of the best records of the year and the Associated Press named it as the tenth-best album of the 2010s. The album was also promoted through the 24K Magic World Tour (2017–2018), along with a number of television appearances.

== Background ==
In early 2014, Bruno Mars was interviewed by that's Shanghai and gave some details of a new album, stating, "I want to write better songs ... put on better shows ... make better music videos. I want my next album to be better than the first and the second." In September 2014, Mars tweeted, "Now it's time to start writing chapter 3", hinting that he was working on new music. Following the release of British-American musician Mark Ronson and Mars's single "Uptown Funk" (2014), Mars went to the studio to record more songs; he said he had no plans to release a new album "until it's done". Mars's new album was due in March 2016 but its release was postponed for several months because of his appearance at that year's Super Bowl half-time show. At the time, seven songs were already recorded. Mars worked with Canadian recording engineer Charles Moniz, who called the album the "next movement of Bruno" and confirmed the album was close to being finished in February 2016. Mars also worked with American musician Andrew Wyatt, who was involved in Mars's previous studio albums, and American bass guitarist Jamareo Artis, of The Hooligans, who said they had been "trying different ideas and experimenting" and "It's going to have a new sound ... the material is very groove-oriented". Mars also worked with American rapper Missy Elliott, but he said they were just hanging out.

In an interview with New Zealand radio DJ Zane Lowe for the Apple Music podcast Beats 1, Mars said the album is filled with 1990s influences. Mars concluded; "I just want to do music. I want to be the guy that brings joy to your life through his music." Mars affirmed he felt he was correct to record nine songs, saying; "If I can't pull you in with nine songs, I'm not gonna pull you in with nineteen!" He told that the album was inspired by a non-existent movie that he visualized. Mars said it featured "a Versace-wearing pimp" in New York during a summer night at the "baddest rooftop house party. 2:30 in the morning, the band comes out, fucking dipped in Versace. The girls are screaming." Mars stated this album contrasts with his others, on which he would experiment with genres: "I wanted to really hone it in and give myself a world in which I could keep it contained ... I want to sing more so than I did on the other albums". He chose to emulate "the feeling of the R&B he fell in love with as a kid", avoiding making it sound like a tribute or forced, taking inspiration from Jimmy Jam and Terry Lewis, New Edition, Bobby Brown, Jodeci, Boyz II Men, Teddy Riley, Mariah Carey and Kenneth "Babyface" Edmonds. In November 2017, Mars was a guest on the Charlie Rose Show and said as he grew up pop music was "R&B-rooted songs", which he danced to at school balls and barbecues. Mars wanted to achieve the same "feeling and emotion", concluding "it was fun to dance, it was cool to smile on the dance floor with a girl and flirt with a girl on the dance floor". To achieve his aim to make people want to dance again, he needed the songs to make him dance. Mars was inspired by his passion "for R&B acts"; he said that was the feeling they wanted the album to have. He added, "it was all about the live show and the kind of party I want to throw".

Although Mars was able to convince Atlantic Records of the album's sound, they were initially hesitant. A private album listening party was held at Atlantic's offices in New York City for several journalists.

== Recording ==
Mars reunited with frequent collaborators, American songwriter, and producers, Philip Lawrence and Christopher Brody Brown, forming a new production trio, Shampoo Press & Curl, to record 24K Magic. It was recorded at Glenwood Place Studios in Burbank, California between the fall 2015 and September 2016. Nevertheless, the singer returned to the studio on the first week of October to complete the album. Mars revealed that he was not confident about returning to the studio after releasing "Uptown Funk" (2014) and was struggling to write new songs. On top of that, he added that it took him so long to create a song, he needed to "touch an instrument or it won't come out. If I'm not touching the guitar or touching the drum machine or playing the piano, the song just won't come out." He imposed a dress code in the studio during the recording process, favoring jewelry and "fine clothes" over sweatpants to create the "groovy, smooth and soulful songs" on the record.

Lawrence said, "We got the sitting in the studio laboring over songs for hours and days and weeks". He furthered that playing new songs live while recording helped. They noticed what was or not working and what it could be improved. "Finesse" underwent twenty different versions, including one in which Mars sang about "gold chains and cognac over a silky beat", and another which sounded "like a Seventies cop show". "Versace on the Floor" started with a "piña colada vibe" before the beat was remixed, though, Mars felt his vocal performance and lyrics were not emotive enough for a ballad, and changed the melody and re-wrote the track. The singer-songwriter took a long time to write "Too Good to Say Goodbye". It was not complete until Babyface heard the chorus, encouraging the former to complete the song. They composed the song together on a piano. Mars used a flexatone, a percussion instrument, on the album, given to him by DJ Quik.

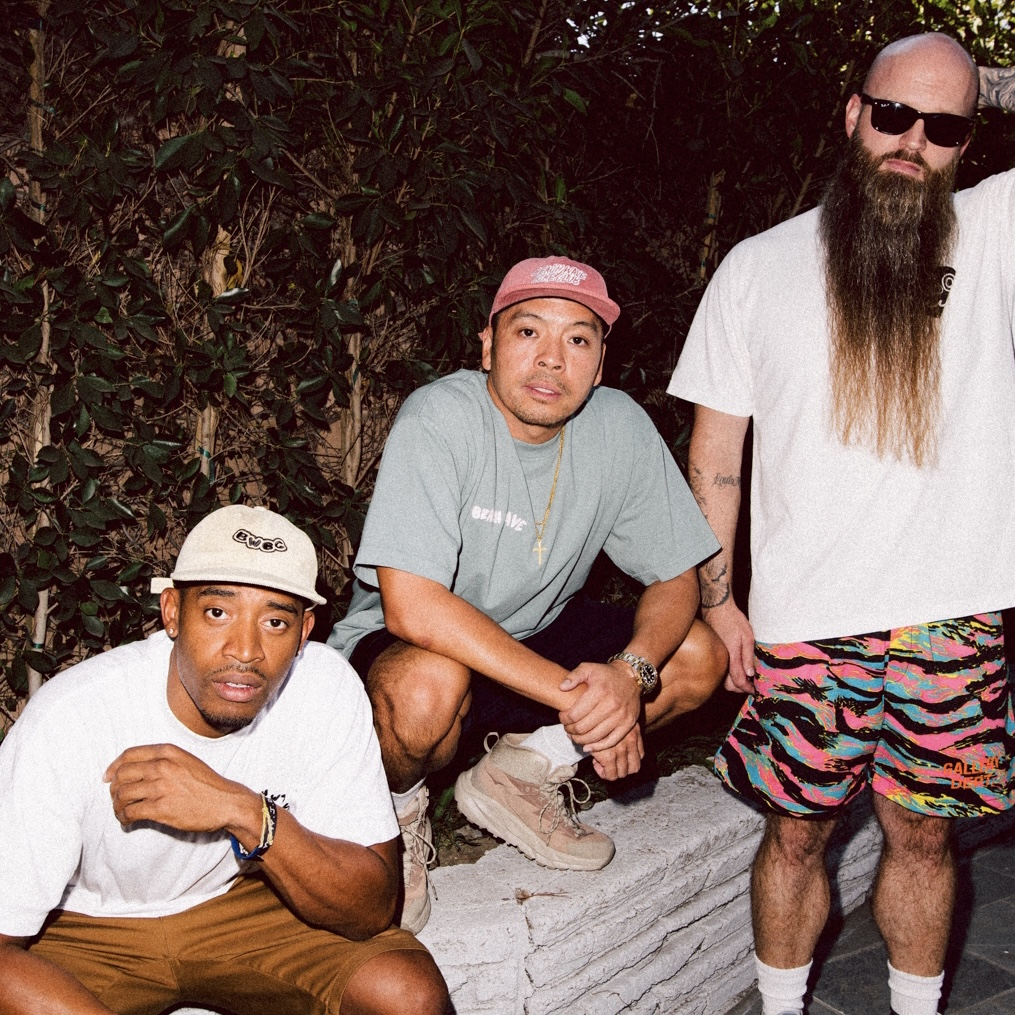
The Stereotypes (pictured) composed several tracks for 24K Magic.

Mars asked American singer-songwriter James Fauntleroy to help him write "That's What I Like", but Fauntleroy end-up co-writing most of the songs on the album. Fauntleroy said; "Bruno is the core of those songs and Phil is a huge part of the reason those songs sound like that." He added that despite having a good time with them, it was "probably the most intense album process of my life". American record producer and DJ Skrillex said he and Mars were creating something "different, awesome and next level and sounds like nothing else that's happened before". He also affirmed that they could work on "more of a Skrillex thing". The song they were working on was not completed in time for the album's release. American rapper T-Pain who worked on "Straight Up & Down", said he saw Mars and his band, with the engineer "jamming out and having a good time". T-Pain affirmed Mars "was real specific about what he wanted".

The Stereotypes, a production team, were also involved in the album's composition. They have worked with Mars since 2007, however, after the singer signed a deal with Atlantic Records they did not collaborate very often. Nevertheless, in 2015, Jonathan Yip, a member of the Stereotypes, talked with Mars about working together. The latter asked for "some beats" for 24K Magic, but "nothing came of it". In June 2016, Mars asked Yip if they would like to help him finish a song for his album. He needed another song with a certain tempo and key. Yip sent Mars an idea that caught his attention, and he asked the Stereotypes to come to the studio. Once in the studio, it took them some time to "get the groove" on the track. They spent the first couple of hours catching up and having fun. The Stereotypes helped Mars finishing "24K Magic" and "That's What I Like". They also created "Finesse" with Shampoo Press & Curl. The team noticed that Mars "is his own biggest critic" and a "perfectionist".

In August 2016, the album entered the mixing stage. Romanian-American mixing engineer Serban Ghenea had to return to his early career as an R&B and hip-hop engineer, to come up with the "esthetic" for 24K Magic. He explained, "the idea was to have a '90s R&B/hip-hop-influenced album, but with a modern sonic presentation". Moniz told they would felt great regarding a certain song and Mars wanted to "push it further" as he wanted 24K Magic to be "the foundation for his live show". The singer would ask to imagine the songs being performed live, to know their feeling and if they were danceable. The engineer confessed they would start to work in the afternoon and spent 14 hours in the studio each day, with the album taking 22 months to record and once the writing stopped, the singer would "bounce ideas around the room." He said Mars and his team were set to create an R&B album as "it's a part of who they are". Mars was close to the mixing process describing what he wanted for the album.

== Music and lyrics ==
'24K Magic'
A 20-second sample of the lead single, "24K Magic". It is a disco-funk track about jewelry and the party lifestyle.

24K Magic explores several genres, including, R&B, funk, pop, and new jack swing. Andy Kellman of AllMusic, thinks the album "might as well be considered the full-length sequel to "Uptown Funk"; Mars abandoned his previous new wave and reggae sound for an "all-out R&B" effort. The album includes the R&B ballads "Versace on the Floor", "Straight Up & Down" and "Too Good To Say Goodbye". "24K Magic", "Chunky" and "Perm" are funk tracks, while "Calling All My Lovelies" is an R&B heartbreaker song. 24K Magic also features new jack swing, hip-hop soul and funk on the tracks "Finesse" and "That's What I Like", with the latter also being an R&B song. Lyrics on the album are themed around money and sex.

The album opens with a talk box on "24K Magic"; the track's synthesizer riff and backbeat are inspired by "The Message" (1982) by Grandmaster Flash and the Furious Five. Its lyrics celebrate extravagance, glamour, and the party lifestyle. "Chunky" is an electro-funk track that features synthesizers and drum machines. It is an anthem for big buttocks. "Perm" is influenced by the 1960s and James Brown's style on the horns, stabs and drums, according to The New York Times' Jon Caramanica. It is also inspired by Nile Rodgers' electric guitar. Its "shuffle" was compared to Brown's "Funky Drummer" (1970) and features "shout-singing" style and Mars's "scraped-up vocal". The song is about Mars going out and having a "good time" with his companions. "That's What I Like", the album's second single, draws from "the silky vibes" of R. Kelly's 12 Play (1993), taking them to "the boom of modern trap". The song is about extravagance, a luxurious lifestyle, and love.

The slow jam of "Versace on the Floor" shows Mars's romantic side, with champagne flutes, rose petals, dancing and getting intimate with his lover. "Straight Up & Down" opens with a choir and samples of Shai's "Baby I'm Yours" (1993). Its lyrics detail Mars's "favorite bedroom tricks" and a "booty celebration". According to Andrew Unterberger from Billboard, "Calling All My Lovelies" draws inspiration from Silk's "Freak Me" with its "massive harmonies and bass-voiced spoken-word". It tells a story of heartbreak. It includes a "dreamy voicemail message" spoken by American actress Halle Berry. "Finesse" is also a funk, hip-hop soul recording with R&B influences. Lyrically, it demonstrates the happiness and positive outcomes of being with one's lover. The album's final song of the standard edition, "Too Good To Say Goodbye", includes "horn bleats", piano, various harmonies, and "one of Mars' most emotional vocal performances". The track draws its structure from early 1970s Philly soul and 1990s R&B. The remix of "Finesse" features American rapper Cardi B with a flow and rhyme resembling a "turn-of-the-1990s cadence", as well as Salt-N-Pepa and Heavy D styles.

== Cover ==
The cover of 24K Magic shows Mars sitting on a chair and wearing a red shirt and shorts, and a white cap. Mars and Greg "Giden's Dad" Burke created the artwork, which was shot by Chinese photographer Kai Z. Feng. According to Mars, the cover art was inspired by a "musky cologne" advertisement and the Cadillac Allanté convertible that felt like "bootleg luxury". During its development, Mars thought about a man driving the Cadillac that would wear his best silk clothing, a style inspired by his father that included "the pinkie rings, the pompadour", the hairstyle and the "flashy" glasses. The album's cover art was styled to resemble a 1990s album; the song titles are printed in a basic font. During a photography season, Feng was unaware of the reason for Mars "throwing up the number 24 with his fingers". Feng asked Mars whether his pose had anything to do with the album; Mars told Feng to be quiet. He said Mars gave him "a lot of trust" and added Mars "is not shy in front of the camera; he's always moving and dancing, as long as you have the right music playing".

== Release and promotion ==
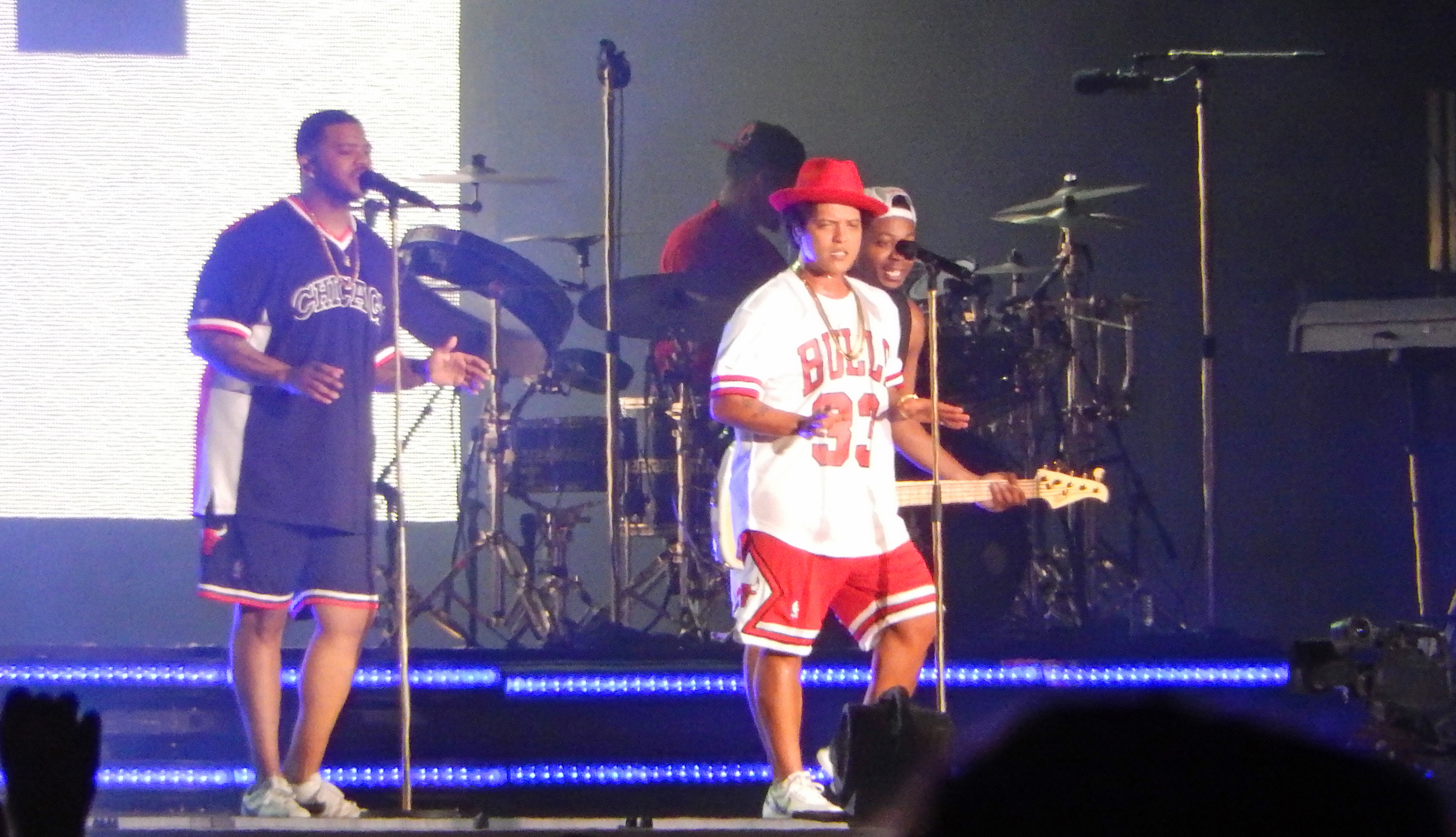
Mars and The Hooligans during the 24K Magic World Tour, as part of the 2018 Lollapalooza festival in Chicago, Illinois

On October 3, 2016, Mars announced the release of the album's first single "24K Magic" via Instagram, dubbing it "the invitation to the party". On October 7, 2016, Mars unveiled the album's title, cover and release date, and a link to a pre-order on iTunes, along with the release of "24K Magic" and its music video. The record was made available for pre-order worldwide via Mars's official site with four buying options. On November 4, 2016, "Versace on the Floor", was issued as a promotional single in several countries.

Mars performed "24K Magic" and "Chunky" live for the first time on Saturday Night Live on October 15, 2016; his performance received positive reactions from critics and the audience. He also performed "24K Magic" live on The X Factor UK on October 30, 2016. The Daily Express's Becca Longmire called the performance "epic". On November 2, 2016, Mars performed several songs for Radio 1 at the BBC's Live Lounge, including "24K Magic", "Treasure", "Locked Out of Heaven" and a cover of Adele's "All I Ask". A couple of days after, the singer performed "24K Magic" at the MTV Europe Music Awards. Later the same month, Mars performed "24K Magic" on the Norwegian television talk show Skavlan and the following day at the 2016 NRJ Music Awards.

A week later, Mars performed the same track at the 2016 American Music Awards. The performance included a break dance. On December 2, 2016, Mars performed at the 2016 Jingle Bell Ball, an annually held event promoted by 102.7 KIIS FM that took place at the Staples Center, Los Angeles, California. He sang the same songs on December 6, 2016, at the 2016 Victoria's Secret Fashion Show. During The Late Late Show with James Corden on December 13, 2016, Mars sang "24K Magic", "Locked Out of Heaven", "Grenade", "Versace on the Floor", "If I Knew", "Uptown Funk" and "Perm" on the popular segment Carpool Karaoke.

Mars embarked on the 24K Magic World Tour, which started on March 28, 2017, at the Sportpaleis in Antwerp, Belgium. The second row of shows consisted of concerts throughout North America and ran from July to November 2017. It also featured performances in Oceania and Asia until May 2018. The 24K Magic World Tour ended on December 31, 2018. On September 12, 2017, it was announced that Mars and his band would be performing a television special concert titled, Bruno Mars: 24K Magic Live at the Apollo at the Apollo Theater. Subsequently, CBS confirmed they would air the program on December 14.

=== Singles ===
The title track "24K Magic" was released as the album's lead single on October 7, 2016, along with its music video. The song was generally well received; reviewers complimented Mars's vocals and compared them to those of James Brown. The song was listed by several publications, including Billboard and Entertainment Weekly, as being among the best songs of the year. The recording was a success, topping the charts in Argentina, Belgium (Flanders), France and New Zealand, and reached the top ten in several other countries, including Australia, Canada, the Netherlands and the United States. "24K Magic" received a Grammy Award for Record of the Year at the 2018 Grammy Awards.

"That's What I Like" was released on January 30, 2017, as the album's second single. Critics gave the song mixed reviews; some considered it to be one of the best on 24K Magic but others criticized its lyrical content. The song topped the Billboard Hot 100 chart, becoming Mars's seventh number-one single in the United States, and peaked at number two on the Philippine Hot 100. It also reached the top twenty in other territories, including Australia, Belgium, Canada, Denmark, and New Zealand. "That's What I Like" received three Grammy Awards; Song of the Year, Best R&B Performance and Best R&B Song.

"Versace on the Floor" was released as the album's third single in the United States on June 12, 2017, while a version of the song remixed by French DJ David Guetta was released as the album's third international single on June 27, 2017; the original version had been premiered as the promotional single from 24K Magic, on November 4, 2016. The track received generally favorable reviews from critics; some considered it to be the soundtrack to school dances while others said its lyrics are sexually driven. The song charted moderately, reaching number 33 on the Billboard Hot 100 and the top three of the Philippine Hot 100 while its remix peaked at number eight in Belgium (Wallonia).

"Chunky" was released as a single in Australia with a radio release date of November 29, 2017. It received mixed reviews from music critics, who noted the track's resemblance to the works of rhythm and blues artists of the 1980s and 1990s. Its charting was influenced by the release of its parent album 24K Magic; "Chunky" reached number 79 on the UK Singles Chart and 34 on the French Singles Chart.

"Finesse" was announced as the fifth and final single from the album; unlike the original track, the single version features verses rapped by Cardi B. It was released on January 4, 2018, to digital stores and streaming services. The single was received well by music critics, who complimented Cardi B's verses and noticed the resemblance to the sound of Bobby Brown's album Don't Be Cruel (1988), Bell Biv DeVoe's track "Poison" (1990) and Michael Jackson's "Remember the Time" (1992). The song was a commercial success, peaking at number two in New Zealand, and at number three in the United States and Canada. It entered the top ten of several countries, including Australia, the Netherlands, and the United Kingdom.

== Critical reception ==
24K Magic ratings
Aggregate scores
Source	Rating
AnyDecentMusic?	6.5/10
Metacritic	70/100
Review scores
Source	Rating
AllMusic	4/5 stars
The A.V. Club	B
Entertainment Weekly	B+
Consequence	B−
The Guardian	3/5 stars
NME	4/5 stars
Pitchfork	6.2/10
Q	3/5 stars
Rolling Stone	3/5 stars
USA Today	2.5/4 stars

24K Magic was met with generally favorable reviews from music critics. At Metacritic, the album received an average score of 70, based on 14 reviews. Aggregator AnyDecentMusic? gave 24K Magic 6.5 out of 10, based on their assessment of the critical consensus.

Patrick Bowman of Idolator rated the album four and a half stars out of five, writing that Mars "relish[es] every moment he gets to play the golden-voiced lothario dripping with swag and Versace." HipHopDX's Carl Lamarre gave it a 4.3/5 rating. Lamarre felt Mars "succinctly gets his point across by instilling that much needed old-school nostalgia lacking in music today with nine tracks. Nolan Feeney from Entertainment Weekly gave it a B+ and stated that "With only nine songs, there's not an ounce of fat on Magic, and nearly every track sounds like Top 40 gold", describing the record as a fusion of 70's funk and 90's R&B. Nick Levine of NME rated the record four out of five stars. Levine said "few albums designed to sound like a party actually play like one, but Bruno Mars has pulled it off with style." Reviewing 24K Magic for AllMusic, Andy Kellman gave the album four stars out of five, finding the recording to be the sequel to "Uptown Funk" (2014).

The A.V. Club's Annie Zaleski gave it a B rating and wrote it is "easily his most cohesive and enjoyable collection, an escapist record that comes by its evocations of the past honestly". Troy L. Smith from Cleveland.com wrote, "Mars is the kind of songwriter who knows how to take what's worked a million times over and that something extra to make it his own. At this point it's getting damn near impossible to not like a Bruno Mars album." The New York Times' Jon Caramanica said "the new songs – his most diverse set to date, and mostly rigorously executed and fun – show Mr. Mars to be interested in different musical eras, different production approaches and different singing voices without veering into chaos". Karen Gwee of Consequence awarded the album a B− score, calling it a "fun, nostalgic R&B album from one of pop's best performers today". Andrew Unterberger from Billboard said it "pays homage to any number of pop performers from his canon, in winking tributes that still keep one foot (or at least a couple of toes) in the present".

In a mixed review, Daniel Bromfield writing for Spectrum Culture rated 24K Magic 3.25 out of 5 stars. Bromfield said, "There's a sense of remove here – as if you can only gaze at Mars in awe, like his namesake planet, and never hope to connect with him. 24K Magic may improve with time. For now, it's hard not to feel underwhelmed." Pitchfork's Katherine St. Asaph rated it 6.2 out of 10, and likened it to a theme-park version of funk and R&B: "rebuilt shinier and glitzier and safer, every element engineered to please more than the real thing, and with a hell of a tour guide. It's not history, not even historical fiction, but harmless fun." The Wall Street Journal' Jim Fusilli wrote, "In comparison to what he's done in the past and to today's rich and adventurous funk and R&B, the album feels a tad tepid at times. But it's quality, never-dull work by a quality, never-dull artist who lovingly revives the sounds he savored on his way up." Jim Carroll from The Irish Times, Caroline Sullivan from The Guardian, and Victoria Segall from Q all rated 24K Magic three stars out of five. Carroll said, "Mars shows he's a smart operator when it comes to the sort of pop which has all the accoutrements needed to engineer earworms, yet is sussed enough to know a little dab of special sauce is often required". Sullivan wrote, "though Mars styles himself as a playa here ... the core of the album is his passion for the early 90s period when hip-hop met soul". Segall stated "24K Magic's luxe exterior writes cheques its soul can't cash".

Reviewing the record for Rolling Stone, Christopher R. Weingarten rated it three stars out of five. He said it "may not be the most glittering display for Bruno Mars the pop star, but fans can rest assured it is a shining moment for Bruno Mars the producer, arranger and nostalgia curator". In a similar vein, USA Today' Patrick Ryan called it Mars's "most polished album yet and a laudable step forward production-wise" but added it appears "oddly aloof" because it lacks the "vulnerability" of Mars's own ballads such as "Grenade" (2010) and "When I Was Your Man" (2013). Ryan rated it two and a half stars out of four. Jonathan Wroble of Slant Magazine gave it three stars out of five stars and called the album "a tidy, if derivative, antidote to today's overthought, overwrought pop". The Observer's Kitty Empire rated the album three stars out of five and wrote, "Anyone in need of indulgent escapism will find plenty here. But you do wonder ... if more bling and circuses is what's required right now." In a negative review, Andy Gill from The Independent gave it two stars out of five, saying, "the final product is a much tamer beast, taking its lead more from Mars' position as frontman of Mark Ronson's "Uptown Funk" (2014)". Gill heavily criticized "That's What I Like" and "Chunky".

=== Accolades ===
At the end of 2016, 24K Magic appeared on a number of critics' lists of the year's top albums. Idolator listed the album at number seven on its list of the Top 10 Best Albums of 2016. Carl Willot wrote, "Bruno's complete dedication to reviving lost sounds on 24K means it probably won't leave a long shadow. But that's the point." Willot described it as "pop party pizza". In a top-twenty list, Rolling Stone rated it the twelfth-best pop album of 2016. Keith Harris wrote the recording has the "high-energy Eighties dance-pop homage Mars perfected on "Uptown Funk" with some Nineties retro flavor for retro escapism". According to Rap-Up, it was the seventeenth-best album of 2016.

Digital Spy's Lewis Corner considered it the eighteenth-best album of 2016, saying it "resulted in Bruno's most confident and seductive collection yet". Complex, in its list of 50 Best Albums of 2016, ranked the record in the twentieth-eight position. Ross Scarano asked, "If I told you Bruno Mars recorded an album that sounded like a middle school dance, would you know I meant that as a compliment?" The Associated Press named 24K Magic the tenth-best album of the 2010s; according to Mesfin Fekadu, "Bruno Mars released three epic albums this decade, but 24K Magic was a whole mood". The record was also deemed the sixty-ninth best album of the decade by Billboard.

In 2017, 24K Magic was nominated for Top R&B Album at the 2017 Billboard Music Awards. It won Best Selling Album at the 2017 RTHK International Pop Poll Awards and was nominated for Album of the Year at the BET Awards. The record was also nominated for Best International Album at LOS40 Music Awards 2017. The album was awarded Favorite Pop/Rock Album and Favorite Soul/R&B Album at the 2017 American Music Awards. The album won Album/Mixtape of the Year at the 2017 Soul Train Music Awards. It was named Modern Pop-Rock Album/Voice Recording of the Year at the 2017 Fonogram Awards. The next year, 24K Magic was nominated for seven Grammy Awards at the 2018 Grammy Awards, including Album of the Year and Best R&B Album. Mars won six of the Grammy Awards for the album while the seventh Grammy Award, Best Engineered Album, Non-Classical, went to the album's audio engineers Charles Moniz, Jacob Dennis, Ghenea, John Hanes and Tom Coyne. At the aforementioned ceremony, Mars became the second artist to win Record and Song of the Year with two different songs from the same album. It received Record Production/Album at the 2018 TEC Awards. The album also won International Album of the Year at the Danish GAFFA Awards and Top R&B Album at the 2018 Billboard Music Awards. It was nominated for International Album of the Year at the Juno Awards of 2018.

== Commercial performance ==
24K Magic debuted at number two on the Billboard 200 with first-week sales of 231,000 equivalent album units (194,000 in traditional album sales), becoming Mars's best sales week to that point and his third top-ten album in the United States. The next week, it sold 73,000 units, dropping to number four. The album remained in the US top ten for a third consecutive week despite a 20% fall in sales to 58,000 units. The album remained in the top ten for the next few weeks, returning to number two for four nonconsecutive weeks; one of these followed Mars's two performances at the 2017 Grammy Awards.

As of July 7, 2017, 24K Magic had sold 1,110,000 equivalent units in the United States. On January 3, 2018, Billboard announced the best-selling albums of 2017 in the United States, with 24K Magic selling 710,000 copies and 1,626,000 total equivalent album units. It was the country's fourth-highest-selling and overall fifth-most-consumed record of the year. It was Mars first album to enter the US Top R&B/Hip-Hop Albums, debuting at number one. The album has spent 54 weeks on the top ten and eight non-consecutive weeks at number one on the Top R&B/Hip-Hop Albums chart. In 2017, 24k Magic was the second-most popular record on the Billboard 200. The album was ranked as the 16th-best performing album of the 2010s decade on the U.S. Billboard 200 Albums. It has been certified three-times platinum by the Recording Industry Association of America (RIAA).

The album was less successful in Europe. It debuted at number three on the UK Albums Chart with sales of 52,300 copies in its first week. Its equivalent album units of 600,000 in the UK, earned a double platinum certification from the British Phonographic Industry (BPI). In France, 24K Magic debuted in the top three and spent almost the whole year in the chart. Seven months after its release, equivalent album units exceeded 200,000, being certified twice platinum by the Syndicat National de l'Édition Phonographique (SNEP). The record peaked at number four on the Spanish Albums Chart and spent 109 weeks on the chart. It was certified platinum by Productores de Música de España (PROMUSICAE). It also debuted and peaked at number five in the Netherlands, spending 135 weeks on the chart. It was certified platinum by NVPI. In Denmark, 24K Magic peaked at number six after debuting at number nine upon release. It was certified double platinum by IFPI Danmark.

In Oceania, 24K Magic debuted at number two in New Zealand and was certified gold by the Recorded Music NZ (RMNZ) for selling more than 7,500 equivalent album units in three weeks. The album returned to number two in New Zealand, becoming the singer's third consecutive record to do so. 24K Magic was certified seven-times platinum in New Zealand for 105,000 units. It was the seventh best-selling album in New Zealand in 2017. The record entered the Australian Albums charts at number three, and with it, his three first albums reached the top five. The Australian Recording Industry Association (ARIA) certified it platinum. In Japan, the album debuted at number six on the Oricon Albums Chart with first-week sales of 20,000 copies. In the second week the album jumped to number three on the chart, selling 15,000 copies. It was eventually certified gold by the Recording Industry Association of Japan (RIAJ). In Canada, 24K Magic debuted at its peak position of number two with 21,000 total consumption units. It spent 89 weeks on the Canadian Albums Chart and was certified five times platinum by Music Canada (MC). As of October 2019, 24K Magic sold five million units globally.

== Track listing ==
Credits adapted from the liner notes of 24K Magic.

24K Magic standard edition
No.	Title	Writer(s)	Producer(s)	Length
1.	"24K Magic"	Bruno Mars; Philip Lawrence; Christopher Brody Brown	Shampoo Press & Curl; The Stereotypes^{[a]}	3:46
2.	"Chunky"	Mars; Lawrence; Brown; James Fauntleroy	Shampoo Press & Curl	3:06
3.	"Perm"	Mars; Lawrence; Brown; Fauntleroy; Homer Steinweiss; Trevor Lawrence, Jr.	Shampoo Press & Curl	3:30
4.	"That's What I Like"	Mars; Lawrence; Brown; Fauntleroy; Johnathan Yip; Ray Romulus; Jeremy Reeves; Ray Charles McCullough II	Shampoo Press & Curl; The Stereotypes^{[b]}	3:26
5.	"Versace on the Floor"	Mars; Lawrence; Brown; Fauntleroy	Shampoo Press & Curl	4:21
6.	"Straight Up & Down"	Mars; Lawrence; Brown; Fauntleroy; Faheem Najm; Carl Martin; Marc Gay	Shampoo Press & Curl; Emile Haynie	3:18
7.	"Calling All My Lovelies"	Mars; Lawrence; Brown; Fauntleroy; Haynie; Jeff Bhasker	Shampoo Press & Curl; Haynie; Bhasker	4:10
8.	"Finesse"	Mars; Lawrence; Brown; Fauntleroy; Yip; Romulus; Reeves; McCullough II	Shampoo Press & Curl; The Stereotypes	3:10
9.	"Too Good to Say Goodbye"	Mars; Lawrence; Brown; Bhasker; Kenneth "Babyface" Edmonds	Shampoo Press & Curl	4:41
Total length:				33:28

Digital version bonus video
No.	Title	Director(s)	Length
10.	"24K Magic" (music video)	Mars; Cameron Duddy	3:46

Japanese deluxe edition (CD)
No.	Title	Writer(s)	Producers (s)	Length
10.	"Finesse (Remix)" (featuring Cardi B)	Mars; Lawrence; Brown; Fauntleroy; Yip; Romulus; Reeves; McCullough II; Belcalis Almanzar; Klenord Raphael	Shampoo Press & Curl; The Stereotypes	3:37

Japanese deluxe edition (Blu-ray)
No.	Title	Writer(s)	Director	Length
1.	"Good Morning Harlem"		Chris Howie
2.	"24K Magic"	Mars; Lawrence; Brown	Howie
3.	"Finesse"	Mars; Lawrence; Brown; Fauntleroy; Yip; Romulus; Reeves; McCullough II	Howie
4.	"Perm"	Mars; Lawrence; Brown; Fauntleroy; Steinweiss; Lawrence, Jr.	Howie
5.	"Chess in Harlem"		Howie
6.	"Calling All My Lovelies"	Mars; Lawrence; Brown; Fauntleroy; Haynie; Bhasker	Howie
7.	"Chunky"	Mars; Lawrence; Brown; Fauntleroy	Howie
8.	"Treasure"	Mars; Lawrence; Ari Levine; Phredley Brown; Thibaut Berland; Christopher Khan	Howie
9.	"That's What I Like"	Mars; Lawrence; Brown; Fauntleroy; Yip; Romulus; Reeves; McCullough II	Howie
10.	"Straight Up & Down"	Mars; Lawrence; Brown; Fauntleroy; Najm; Martin; Gay	Howie
11.	"Versace on the Floor"	Mars; Lawrence; Brown; Fauntleroy	Howie
12.	"Sylvia's Soul Food"		Howie
13.	"Uptown Funk" (Mark Ronson featuring Bruno Mars)	Ronson; Mars; Lawrence; Bhasker; Nicholas Williams; Devon Gallaspy; Lonnie Simmons; Charles Wilson; Ronnie Wilson; Robert Wilson; Rudolph Taylor	Howie
14.	"Credits"		Howie

Notes

- ^{^[a]} signifies an additional producer
- ^{^[b]} signifies a co-producer

Sample credits

- "Straight Up & Down" contains an interpolation of "Baby I'm Yours" performed by Shai.

== Personnel ==
Credits adapted from the liner notes of 24K Magic.

Technical and composing credits

- Shampoo Press & Curl – executive production, production (all tracks)
- Bruno Mars – lead vocals, background vocals (tracks 1–9), talk box (track 1)
- The Stereotypes – additional production (tracks 1, 4, 8), additional drum programming (track 2)
- Emile Haynie – production (tracks 6–7)
- Jeff Bhasker – production (track 7)
- Philip Lawrence – background vocals (tracks 1–9)
- Christopher Brody Brown – background vocals (tracks 1, 3)
- James Fauntleroy – background vocals (tracks 1, 2, 4, 5)
- Kenneth "Babyface" Edmonds – background vocals (track 9)
- Lisenny – background vocals (track 2)
- Halle Berry – additional vocals (track 7)
- Byron "Mr. TalkBox" Chambers – talk box (track 1)
- David Foreman – guitar (track 1)
- Dwayne Dugger – horns (track 3)
- Jimmy King – horns (track 3)
- Kameron Whalum – horns (track 3)
- Ken Lewis – additional horns (track 3)
- Homer Steinweiss – drums (track 3)
- Eric "E-Panda" Hernandez – live drums (track 4)
- Greg Phillinganes – keyboard solo (track 5)

Creative credits

- Bruno Mars – album art
- Greg "Gigen's Dad" Burke – album art
- Kai Z. Feng – photography
- Shmuel Dolla Sign – jeweler

Recording personnel

- Charles Moniz – engineering, recording (all tracks)
- Jacob Dennis – engineering assistant (all tracks)
- Serban Ghenea – mixing (all tracks)
- John Hanes – engineered for mix (all tracks)
- Tom Coyne – mastering (all tracks)

== Charts ==
=== Weekly charts ===
List of chart positions
Chart (2016–2018)	Peak position
Australian Albums (ARIA)	3
Austrian Albums (Ö3 Austria)	14
Belgian Albums (Ultratop Flanders)	4
Belgian Albums (Ultratop Wallonia)	5
Canadian Albums (Billboard)	2
Croatian International Albums (HDU)	4
Czech Albums (ČNS IFPI)	17
Danish Albums (Hitlisten)	6
Dutch Albums (Album Top 100)	5
Finnish Albums (Suomen virallinen lista)	17
French Albums (SNEP)	2
German Albums (Offizielle Top 100)	9
Hungarian Albums (MAHASZ)	5
Irish Albums (IRMA)	4
Italian Albums (FIMI)	14
Japanese Albums (Oricon)	3
Latvian Albums (LaIPA)	97
Mexican Albums (Top 100 Mexico)	7
New Zealand Albums (RMNZ)	2
Norwegian Albums (VG-lista)	8
Polish Albums (ZPAV)	34
Portuguese Albums (AFP)	5
Scottish Albums (Official Charts)	5
Slovak Albums (ČNS IFPI)	9
Spanish Albums (Promusicae)	4
Swedish Albums (Sverigetopplistan)	7
Swiss Albums (Schweizer Hitparade)	4
UK Albums (Official Charts)	3
US Billboard 200	2
US Top R&B/Hip-Hop Albums (Billboard)	1

=== Monthly charts ===
Monthly chart performance for 24K Magic
Chart (2016)	Peak position
Argentine Albums (CAPIF)	6

=== Year-end charts ===
List of chart positions
Chart (2016)	Position
Australian Albums (ARIA)	33
Belgian Albums (Ultratop Flanders)	36
Belgian Albums (Ultratop Wallonia)	81
Dutch Albums (MegaCharts)	59
French Albums (SNEP)	33
Mexican Albums (AMPROFON)	79
New Zealand Albums (RMNZ)	27
Spanish Albums (PROMUSICAE)	39
UK Albums (OCC)	24

List of chart positions
Chart (2017)	Position
Australian Albums (ARIA)	16
Belgian Albums (Ultratop Flanders)	24
Belgian Albums (Ultratop Wallonia)	69
Canadian Albums (Billboard)	6
Danish Albums (Hitlisten)	18
Dutch Albums (MegaCharts)	21
French Albums (SNEP)	65
Icelandic Albums (Plötutíóindi)	35
Italian Albums (FIMI)	72
Mexican Albums (AMPROFON)	70
New Zealand Albums (RMNZ)	7
Spanish Albums (PROMUSICAE)	24
Swedish Albums (Sverigetopplistan)	29
Swiss Albums (Schweizer Hitparade)	62
UK Albums (OCC)	25
US Billboard 200	2
US Top R&B/Hip-Hop Albums (Billboard)	3

List of chart positions
Chart (2018)	Position
Australian Albums (ARIA)	27
Belgian Albums (Ultratop Flanders)	40
Canadian Albums (Billboard)	50
Danish Albums (Hitlisten)	99
Dutch Albums (MegaCharts)	40
Japanese Albums (Billboard Japan)	51
New Zealand Albums (RMNZ)	15
Spanish Albums (PROMUSICAE)	48
UK Albums (OCC)	86
US Billboard 200	26
US Top R&B/Hip-Hop Albums (Billboard)	17

List of chart position
Chart (2019)	Position
US Billboard 200	120

=== Decade-end charts ===
List of chart positions
Chart (2010–2019)	Position
US Billboard 200	16
US Top R&B/Hip-Hop Albums (Billboard)	12

== Certifications ==
List of Certifications
Region	Certification	Certified units/sales
Australia (ARIA)	Platinum	70,000^{^}
Canada (Music Canada)	5× Platinum	400,000^{‡}
Denmark (IFPI Danmark)	2× Platinum	40,000^{‡}
France (SNEP)	3× Platinum	300,000^{‡}
Hungary (MAHASZ)	Gold	1,000^{^}
Italy (FIMI)	Platinum	50,000^{‡}
Japan (RIAJ)	Gold	100,000^{^}
Mexico (AMPROFON)	Platinum	60,000^{^}
Netherlands (NVPI)	Platinum	40,000^{‡}
New Zealand (RMNZ)	7× Platinum	105,000^{‡}
Portugal (AFP)	Gold	7,500^{^}
Singapore (RIAS)	2× Platinum	20,000^{*}
Spain (Promusicae)	Platinum	40,000^{‡}
United Kingdom (BPI)	2× Platinum	600,000^{‡}
United States (RIAA)	3× Platinum	3,000,000^{‡}
^{*} Sales figures based on certification alone.^{^} Shipments figures based on certification alone.^{‡} Sales+streaming figures based on certification alone.

== Release history ==
Release dates and formats
Region	Date	Label	Format(s)	Edition	Ref.
Various	November 18, 2016	Atlantic	CD; digital download; streaming; vinyl	Standard	
Japan	April 11, 2018	Warner Music Japan	CD + Blu-ray	Deluxe	
France	June 29, 2018	Atlantic	CD + Blu-ray	Deluxe	
Germany	June 29, 2018	Atlantic	CD + Blu-ray	Deluxe	
Spain	June 29, 2018	Atlantic	CD + Blu-ray	Deluxe	
United Kingdom	July 6, 2018	Atlantic	CD + Blu-ray	Deluxe	
Australia	July 13, 2018	Atlantic	CD + Blu-ray	Deluxe	

== See also ==
- List of Billboard number-one R&B/hip-hop albums of 2016
- List of Billboard number-one R&B/hip-hop albums of 2017
- List of Billboard number-one R&B/hip-hop albums of 2018
