= Brody Brown =

American songwriter and producer

- Born: Christopher Steven Brown; Compton, California, U.S.
- Genres: Pop; hip hop; R&B
- Occupations: Songwriter; record producer; multi-instrumentalist
- Years active: 2002–present
- Label: 80s Baby
- Member of: 1500 or Nothin'; Shampoo Press & Curl

Christopher Steven "Brody" Brown is an American songwriter and record producer. He met Bruno Mars in 2008, and in 2015 formed the production team Shampoo Press & Curl. He is also a member of the production group 1500 or Nothin', alongside James Fauntleroy, Lamar Edwards and Larrance Dopson. Brown has written or produced for artists including Nipsey Hussle, CeeLo Green, Kesha, Adele, Lukas Graham, Ed Sheeran, Snoop Dogg, Wiz Khalifa, and Mark Ronson.

== Early life ==
Brown was born in Compton, California. Growing up, although he listened to some jazz, he mainly listened to the gospel that he was surrounded by at home. As a child, he taught himself to read music and play the drums, bass, guitar and piano. In junior high school, in addition to playing with the school band, he played with rock, salsa, and jazz bands. He also performed regularly at local churches.

Brown was a member of The Crips. He was shot at and jailed as a teenager. In a 2016 interview he said that music "kept him from becoming another statistic in a hard neighborhood."

== Career ==
Brown joined 1500 or Nothin' in 2003, and prior to dropping out of high school in 2005, began writing and playing with Bobby Valentino, whom he met through a mutual friend. At 17, he signed a publishing deal with Steve Lindsey, a publishing executive who had also signed Mike Elizondo, Kara DioGuardi, J.R. Rotem, and Mars, among others. Lindsey showed Brown and fellow songwriters Mars and Jeff Bhasker (whom Mars met through Mike Lynn) the ins and outs of writing pop music and acted as a mentor, helping them to hone their craft.

Brown subsequently co-wrote tracks with Mars for his debut album, Doo-Wops & Hooligans (2010), Unorthodox Jukebox (2012), 24k Magic (2016), and Silk Sonic's An Evening with Silk Sonic. Other songs he co-wrote with Mars include "Grenade", which was nominated for six Grammy Awards in 2011, and the 24K Magic title track, "That's What I Like", which in 2017 won the Grammy Award for Song of the Year, Best R&B Song, and Best R&B Performance. 24K Magic also won Album of the Year. He and Mars additionally worked together on tracks for other artists, including Adele's "All I Ask", from 25 (2015), Snoop Dogg & Wiz Khalifa's "Young, Wild, & Free", Mark Ronson's "Feel Right" and CeeLo Green's "Fuck You".

Brown was a co-writer on Silk Sonic's "Leave the Door Open", which won four 2022 Grammy Awards: Song of the Year, Record of the Year, Best R&B Song, and Best R&B Performance.

== Grammy Awards ==
| Year | Nominee / work | Award | Result |
|---|---|---|---|
| 2010 | "Fuck You" (CeeLo Green) | Song of the Year | Nominated |
| 2011 | "Grenade" (Bruno Mars) | Song of the Year | Nominated |
| 2012 | "Young, Wild & Free" (Snoop Dogg; Wiz Khalifa and Bruno Mars) | Best Rap Song | Nominated |
| 2017 | 25 (Adele) | Album of the Year | Won |
| 2018 | 24K Magic (Bruno Mars) | Album of the Year | Won |
| 2018 | "24K Magic" (Bruno Mars) | Record of the Year | Won |
| 2018 | "That's What I Like" (Bruno Mars) | Song of the Year | Won |
| 2018 | "That's What I Like" (Bruno Mars) | Best R&B Song | Won |
| 2022 | "Leave the Door Open" (Silk Sonic) | Song of the Year | Won |
| 2022 | "Leave the Door Open" (Silk Sonic) | Best R&B Song | Won |
| 2026 | "Apt." (Rosé and Bruno Mars) | Song of the Year | Nominated |

== Discography ==
The Kickback (2023)

== Selected discography ==
| Year | Album or Song | Artist | Credit |
|---|---|---|---|
| 2026 | The Romantic | Bruno Mars | Composer |
| 2021 | An Evening with Silk Sonic | Silk Sonic | Composer, instrumentation |
| 2020 | Alicia | Alicia Keys | Composer |
| 2020 | 6pc Hot EP | 6LACK | Producer |
| 2019 | No. 6 Collaborations Project | Ed Sheeran | Composer |
| 2018 | Victory Lap | Nipsey Hussle | Producer, programmer Keyboards additional production |
| 2017 | That's What I Like | Bruno Mars | Composer |
| 2017 | Rainbow | Kesha | Producer |
| 2016 | "Versace on the Floor" | Bruno Mars | Composer |
| 2016 | "Open Heart" (Acoustic live) | CeeLo Green | Composer |
| 2016 | 24K Magic | Bruno Mars | Composer, vocals (background) |
| 2015 | Uptown Special | Mark Ronson | Bass, composer |
| 2015 | Ludaversal | Ludacris | Composer |
| 2015 | "Beast Mode" | Ludacris | Composer |
| 2015 | Lucas Graham | Lukas Graham | Executive producer, composer |
| 2015 | 25 | Adele | Composer, piano |
| 2014 | Music of Grand Theft Auto V | Soundtrack | Composer |
| 2012 | Unorthodox Jukebox | Bruno Mars | Composer |
| 2012 | Food & Liquor II; The Great American Rap Album Pt. 1 | Lupe Fiasco | Composer, producer, programmer |
| 2011 | The R.E.D. Album | The Game | Composer, producer |
| 2011 | The Muppets Original Motion Picture Soundtrack | The Muppets | Composer |
| 2010 | "Fuck You" | CeeLo Green | Composer |
| 2010 | Doo-Wops & Hooligans | Bruno Mars | Composer, multi-instrumentalist instrumentation |
| 2010 | B.o.B Presents: The Adventures of Bobby Ray | B.o.B | Bass, guitar |
| 2009 | Malice N Wonderland | Snoop Dogg | Composer |
