= 944 Magazine =

Fashion, entertainment, and lifestyle magazine

- Categories: Fashion, entertainment, lifestyle
- Frequency: Monthly
- Founded: 2001
- Final issue: 2011
- Company: 944 Media
- Country: United States
- Based in: Phoenix; Los Angeles
- Language: English
- Website: www.944.com

944 Magazine was a regional fashion, entertainment and lifestyle publication that operated in the United States from 2001 to 2011.

== History ==
The original 944 Media company was founded in Phoenix in 2001 by Marc Lotenberg. Later it became part of 944 Media based in Los Angeles.

In March 2009, 944 Media announced acquisition of Six Degrees, a competing upscale lifestyle magazine, with editions in Atlanta, Detroit, Miami and Las Vegas as well as its web portal. By October of that year, 944 Media ceased publication of Six Degrees and launched two new editions of 944 magazine to penetrate the Atlanta and Detroit markets. In April 2010 the tenth edition of the magazine was started for Dallas.

In April 2010, 944 Media, LLC. declared Chapter 11 bankruptcy in United States Bankruptcy Court for the Central District of California, Los Angeles Division (Case No. 2:10-23240-AA). 944 Media, LLC. was represented by Landau Gottfried & Berger LLP.

On June 1, 2011, 944 announced that they had published their last issue and would shut the business permanently.
