= It's Better If You Don't Understand =

2010 EP by Bruno Mars

EP by Bruno Mars
- Released: May 11, 2010
- Studio: Levcon (Los Angeles)
- Genre: Pop
- Length: 13:32
- Labels: Elektra; Atlantic
- Producers: The Smeezingtons; Mike Caren

Bruno Mars chronology
It's Better If You Don't Understand (2010)	Doo-Wops & Hooligans (2010)

It's Better If You Don't Understand is the debut extended play (EP) by American singer-songwriter Bruno Mars. The pop EP consists of four tracks and its title comes from the final lyrics of one of its songs, "The Other Side". It was released on May 11, 2010, by Elektra Records in the United States, and on August 11, 2010, by Atlantic Records in France. The song "Count on Me" was not featured on the track list of the latter release. All of the material on the EP was produced by the Smeezingtons, the production team composed by Mars, Philip Lawrence and Ari Levine, with "The Other Side" also produced by Mike Caren and the closing track being co-produced by Jeff Bhasker.

It's Better If You Don't Understand received generally positive reviews from music critics – AllMusic's David Jeffries praised the EP as showcasing Mars's songwriting abilities and its music being a genre that "leans towards" pop, while About.com's Bill Lamb stated that it is "music that should be on your radio". The EP peaked at number 99 on the Billboard 200 albums chart in the United States, and at number 97 on the UK Singles Chart. As of 2017, it has sold 27,000 copies in the United States. To promote the EP, Mars released a home video for "The Other Side". It charted at number 117 on the UK Singles Chart. The EP was certified platinum by Music Canada (MC).

All of the songs from It's Better If You Don't Understand were later included on Mars's debut studio album, Doo-Wops & Hooligans (2010), and, with the exception of "Somewhere in Brooklyn", were performed on the related concert tour of the same name. The tracks were also included during the co-headline tour with Janelle Monáe, Hooligans in Wondaland Tour (2011). In an interview with Los Angeles Times in 2012, Mars later said regretted having "wasted" the title of this record.

== Background ==
After the release of the singles "Nothin' on You" by B.o.B and "Billionaire" by Travie McCoy, both featuring Bruno Mars in the chorus, it was decided that the following step would be releasing a four-track digital EP as fast as possible, so that people would understand that Mars was a "real artist". Those two singles contributed to launching his career as a solo artist. Mars explained that the strength and story behind "The Other Side", one of his favorite songs on the EP, led him to name the recording after the final lyrics on the track.

In an interview with Rap-Up, Mars explained that the song "Somewhere in Brooklyn" is dedicated to his father, who is from Brooklyn, adding that: "everyone can agree that New York is a special place". Lyrically, a girl is the subject of Mars's attention. After they met briefly, he tries to find her again somewhere in Brooklyn. Ari Levine talked in an interview with Sound on Sound about producing some of the songs. "The Other Side", whose production was re-arranged, was intended for somebody else, and several people wrote parts of the track. Concerning the lyrics' concept Mars said they describe: "the lifestyle you end up living as an artist".

In the same interview, Levine explained that "Talking to the Moon" took a long time to record, while he, Mars, and Lawrence decided which drums to use. As a result, the song was arranged and produced "in four different ways". When the team started composing the track, they "only had the first verse and the horns". However, their gut told them they were onto something. At one point the team: "had three different bridges and [they] spent a lot of time trying to find out which one was the best". American record producer and songwriter Jeff Bhasker also collaborated on the track's composition. "Talking to the Moon" was the first song written for the debut release once the three of them finished working with other artists and focused on the EP.

== Composition ==
It's Better If You Don't Understand is composed of four pop songs. Mars explained that the EP is hard to classify since: "I just write songs that I strongly believe in and that are coming from inside. There's no tricks. It's honesty with big melodies. And I'm singing the s*** out of them". The opening track, "Somewhere in Brooklyn", was labeled as a "romantic croon". It features "an emo-pop backing" beat, and it describes, lyrically, Mars chasing the "perfect woman" who got away, and wishing to find her again. The second release, "The Other Side", features a vocal collaboration with Cee Lo Green and B.o.B., and is considered the best on the EP by some critics. The track has been described as incorporating 60's soulful feeling. "The Other Side" shows Mars's darker side has a "soaring pop" hook. The two final tracks were described as "bittersweet ballads". "Count On Me" draws from the works of Jason Mraz and David Cook, featuring a laid back groove with a tropical influence. It conveys the message of comfort found in a friend and being present for those who are important in your life. The closing track, "Talking to the Moon", was described as a pop song with power ballad influences.

== Production and release ==
It's Better If You Don't Understand was produced by the Smeezingtons, an American songwriting and record production team consisting of Bruno Mars, Philip Lawrence, and Ari Levine. "The Other Side" was produced with Mike Caren, while "Talking to The Moon" was co-produced with Jeff Bhasker. Mars and Levine played all the instrumentation on "Somewhere in Brooklyn" and "Count on Me". Atlanta-based rappers Cee Lo Green and B.o.B performed their verses on "The Other Side". Graham Marsh engineered Green's vocals, while Levine engineered and mixed the EP at Levcon Studios, Los Angeles, California.

It's Better If You Don't Understand was released exclusively for digital download on May 11, 2010, by Elektra Records in the US, and in France, on August 11, 2010, by Atlantic Records; this edition did not feature "Count on Me" on the track list. It's Better If You Don't Understand was announced on October 1, 2025, to be getting its first vinyl release by Atlantic Records exclusively for Record Store Day Black Friday 2025.

== Promotion ==
On July 16, 2010, a home video for "The Other Side", directed by Nick Bilardello and Cameron Duddy, was released. The song features guest vocals by Atlanta-based rappers Cee Lo Green and B.o.B. It follows Mars in a casual day in his life; showing him rehearsing, posing at photo shoots or wandering aimlessly around Los Angeles. His artistic abilities are highlighted throughout the video as he plays various instruments, trying to integrate his overnight success with his daily life. According to the singer, "the visuals match the spirit of the song". "The Other Side", "Count on Me", and "Talking to the Moon" were included on the standard edition of the debut studio album, Doo-Wops & Hooligans (2010). "Somewhere in Brooklyn" was a bonus track on the deluxe version of the record. All of the songs were featured on the set list of Mars's Doo-Wops & Hooligans Tour (2010–12), with the exception of "Somewhere in Brooklyn". The tracks were also included during the co-headline tour with Janelle Monáe, Hooligans in Wondaland Tour (2011), with a portion of "Somewhere in Brooklyn" along with "Talking to the Moon" performed as an encore, in some shows.

== Reception ==
=== Critical reception ===
Professional ratings
Review scores
Source	Rating
About.com	4.5/5 stars
AllMusic	3.5/5 stars

Upon its release, It's Better If You Don't Understand received rave reviews from music critics. Bill Lamb of About.com labeled the EP a "pop pleasure", further praising the record by saying "with justice in the pop music world, this is the music that should be on your radio", rating It's Better If You Don't Understand four and a half out of five stars. Writing for AllMusic, David Jeffries called the EP's four songs a "sparse effort that leans towards pop" and drew attention to "the man's songwriting". He also deemed the album a "short set of easy, breezy tunes", which doesn't necessarily leave people "begging for more, but it will make most pop fans open to the idea".

=== Chart performance ===
It's Better If You Don't Understand failed to achieve commercial success. It debuted at number 99 on the Billboard 200, the week of May 29, 2010, where it remained for only one week; As of 2011, it had sold 27,000 copies in the United States. As of 2017, the numbers of copies sold remained the same. It's Better If You Don't Understand reached number 97 on the UK Singles Chart on the week of August 28, 2010, while "The Other Side" charted separately on the UK Singles Chart at number 117. In 2025, the EP was certified platinum by Music Canada (MC) and peaked at number 35 on the Hungarian Physical Albums chart.

== Track listing ==
Credits adapted from It's Better If You Don't Understand liner notes.

No.	Title	Writer(s)	Producer(s)	Length
1.	"Somewhere in Brooklyn"	Bruno Mars; Philip Lawrence; Ari Levine	The Smeezingtons	3:01
2.	"The Other Side" (featuring CeeLo Green and B.o.B)	Mars; Lawrence; Levine; Brody Brown; Mike Caren; Patrick Stump; Kaveh Rastegar; John Wicks; Jeremy Ruzumna; Joshua Lopez; Bobby Simmons Jr.	The Smeezingtons; Caren	3:48
3.	"Count On Me"	Mars; Lawrence; Levine	The Smeezingtons	3:16
4.	"Talking to the Moon"	Mars; Lawrence; Levine; Albert Winkler; Jeff Bhasker	The Smeezingtons; Bhasker^{[a]}	3:27
Total length:				13:32

- ^{^a} signifies a co-producer.

== Charts and certifications ==
List of chart positions
Chart (2011)	Peak position
UK Singles (Official Charts)	97
US Billboard 200	99

List of chart position
Chart (2025)	Peak position
Hungarian Physical Albums (MAHASZ)	35

List of Certifications
Region	Certification	Certified units/sales
Canada (Music Canada)	Platinum	80,000^{‡}
^{‡} Sales+streaming figures based on certification alone.

== Personnel ==
Credits adapted from the liner notes of It's Better If You Don't Understand and AllMusic.

Technical and composing personnel

- The Smeezingtons – producer
- Bruno Mars – lead vocals, background vocals, instrumentation
- Ari Levine – engineer, instrumentation, mixing
- Bobby Simmons Jr. – vocals
- Thomas Callaway – vocals
- Mike Caren – producer
- Jeff Bhasker – producer
- Graham Marsh – engineer

== Release history ==
Release dates and formats
Region	Date	Label	Format	Ref
United States	May 11, 2010	Elektra	Digital download	
France	August 11, 2010	Atlantic	Digital download	
Various	November 28, 2025	Atlantic	LP	
