= It Will Rain =

2011 single by Bruno Mars

Single by Bruno Mars

from the album The Twilight Saga: Breaking Dawn – Part 1: Original Motion Picture Soundtrack
- Released: September 27, 2011
- Recorded: 2011
- Studio: Levcon (Los Angeles, California)
- Genre: Pop; pop-soul
- Length: 4:17
- Label: Chop Shop; Elektra; Atlantic Records
- Songwriters: Bruno Mars; Philip Lawrence; Ari Levine
- Producer: The Smeezingtons

Bruno Mars singles chronology
"Mirror" (2011)	"It Will Rain" (2011)	"Young, Wild & Free" (2011)

Music video
- "It Will Rain" on YouTube

"It Will Rain" is a song by American singer and songwriter Bruno Mars. It was released on September 27, 2011 by Atlantic Records as the lead single and theme song from the soundtrack to The Twilight Saga: Breaking Dawn – Part 1. Mars composed the song with his production team the Smeezingtons. It was partially written during the Hooligans in Wondaland Tour in the United States and finished after the singer watched an early version of the movie which inspired him. The soundtrack for The Twilight Saga: Breaking Dawn – Part 1 was a much expected release and Mars's song was chosen as the lead single by the album's executive producer, Alexandra Patsavas, to promote it. Musically, "It Will Rain" is a pop and pop-soul ballad. Its lyrics tell the agony and torment of a heartbreak and its various stages.

The song received mixed feedback from music critics who praised the vocals, but criticized the over-dramatization of the song. It drew comparisons to Mars's "Grenade" (2010) and "Wild Horses" (1971) by The Rolling Stones. It was commercially successful reaching the top of the charts in the Mainstream Top 40 of the United States, South Korea International Singles and Venezuela Pop/Rock General, number two in New Zealand and top-five in many markets. It reached number three on the Billboard Hot 100 and number five on the Canadian Hot 100. It was certified five times platinum by the Recording Industry Association of America (RIAA) and eight times platinum by Music Canada (MC). It also received a four times platinum certification by the Recorded Music NZ (RMNZ).

The music video, directed by Phil Pinto and Mars, prominently features the singer going through different emotions such as love and anger with his lover as they struggle through a break-up. The video is interpolated with footage from the film Breaking Dawn: Part 1, the fourth movie in the Twilight saga. Mars has performed the song on The Ellen DeGeneres Show and on The X Factor USA. He also promoted it during The Doo-Wops & Hooligans Tour (2010–12) and The Moonshine Jungle Tour (2013–14) interpolated with "If I Knew" (2012). It was also part of the 24K Magic World Tour (2017–18) interpolated with B.o.B and Mars's "Nothin' On You" (2009) and performed on the Bruno Mars Live (2022-24). It has been covered by some artists, including Austin Mahone, Pia Mia and Boyce Avenue on The Voice.

== Background ==
Bruno Mars started writing the song while he was on the Hooligans in Wondaland Tour, "I was just writing to write. I had my guitar with me on tour when I was in the States. I never finished it", he explained. Afterwards he got a call to provide something to the soundtrack, the singer saw some scenes of "Breaking Dawn" and thought to himself "that song I started might be perfect for this". He admitted to have the tune halfway done before visualizing an early cut of the film and, inspired by its characters, put together the finishing touches. In an interview with Billboard, he went on detail "I just had this melody in my head and basically laid it down after I saw the film." He had to watch "most of the movie" to feel "the vibe", as well as its direction.

At the time of the Billboard interview, on September 23, 2011, Mars was unaware of the placement of his song in the movie, he hopefully said "As long as it's not after the credits. I hope it's in a good (scene)!". Later, on November 7, 2011, the singer "hinted" that the single might feature in one of the movie's most pivotal scenes. Before the release of the song, Mars described it as having the same vein as the movies, "the 'Twilight' movies for me (are) a love story. But it's a dark love story", therefore the track is "the darker side of love." He explained that "It Will Rain" is just to be featured on the "Twilight Saga: Breaking Dawn" soundtrack and not his second studio album, "I did this for the 'Twilight' soundtrack, then this is for the 'Twilight' soundtrack".

Alexandra Patsavas, music supervisor for the Twilight films, explained the choice of Mars was due to the wedding, in which Part 1 is centered, "who more appropriate than Bruno Mars to write a timeless, classic wedding song?" "It Will Rain" is the third song featured in the end credits of the franchise's fourth movie, The Twilight Saga: Breaking Dawn – Part 1.

== Production and release ==
"It Will Rain" was written and produced by Mars, Philip Lawrence and Ari Levine, whom are collectively known as the Smeezingtons. Engineering for "It Will Rain" took place at the Levcon Studios, while the mixing was done at Larrabee Sound Studios, both in Los Angeles, California. Along with the song's composition, Levine also engineered the track. Phredley Brown did the arrangement of the strings, Oscar Hidalgo played the bass, Andrew Duckles was responsible for the viola, Charlie Bisharat played the violin with Josefina Vergara, and Suzie Katayama conducted the orchestra. The mixing team included Manny Marroquin, Chris Galland and Erik Madrid, the latter two served as assistants. It was mastered by Stephen Marcussen at Marcussen Mastering in Hollywood, California.

"It Will Rain" was first made available worldwide, excepted in the United Kingdom, as an iTunes exclusive via digital download on September 27, 2011 by Atlantic Records. On the same day, the single could be listened on Mars official website. Atlantic Records sent the track to American contemporary hit radios playlists on October 4, 2011. On October 10, 2011 the single was issued for radio airplay in Italy by Warner Music Group. On October 28, 2011, the song was released in Germany, Austria and Switzerland as a CD single by Elektra Records and in the United Kingdom via digital download on October 31, 2011.

== Composition and lyrical interpretation ==
"It Will Rain"
A 24-second sample of the song, where Mars sings a portion of the chorus.

"It Will Rain" is a pop and pop-soul ballad. Its instrumentation is reminiscent of "Wild Horses" (1971) by The Rolling Stones and Mars's "Grenade" (2010). The song's main structure is backed by piano, percussion that resembles an 80's drum track, backup vocals, a "digital echo" on Mars's voice and "sweeping strings". It starts with a piano chord in a menacing, dissonant crescendo with "solemn chord progression" and "haunting backup vocals". Suddenly, the a "light simple piano riff" starts, accompanied by a chorus.

"It Will Rain" was composed in a key of D major with a tempo of 72 beats per minute. Lyrically, the record shows the agony and torment of a heartbreak. It describes the universal emotional pain of relationship bonds like morphine ("If you ever leave me, baby / leave some morphine at my door"), romantic attachment and behavioral addiction. It shows the results of being ripped apart that leads to depression. Several publications noticed the over-dramatization of the lyrics.

Simon Vozick-Levinson of the Rolling Stone and Tris McCall from Nj.com dubbed "It Will Rain" as Mars's next radio hit. Mars's vocals have been highly praised, with Billboard writing "pitch-perfect vocals" while PopDust felt that "it shouldn't be surprising that he sings this well." Upon the single release, Mars started regretting the key he wrote the song in. In 2012, on the Billboard Cover Story, the artist revealed his displeasure and annoyance with the final mix of his vocals on the song, and whenever the song was playing he had to "turn off the radio" as he "felt like a mosquito singing."

== Reception ==
"It Will Rain" received generally mixed reviews. Billboard gave the song a 4 out of 5 stars, denoting that the song explores "the darker insecurities first seen in..."Grenade"". Billboard compared the song's piano riff to the ones used by the artist himself, while the percussion and chord progression was reminiscent of "OneRepublic's oeuvre more than Mars' sunny hits". The review concluded with positive feedback for the singer's "pitch-perfect vocals and his knack for warbling about women troubles, the man once again delivers."

In a mixed review, HitFix's Melinda Newman felt the recording "has the dated feel of a song from the '80s, perhaps because of the drum track." The "few chord changes" reminded her of "Wild Horses" by The Rolling Stones. Newman also said that "Against All Odds" by Phil Collins would be a more suitable choice for the soundtrack than "It Will Rain". Similarly, Simon Vozick-Levinson of Rolling Stone also drew a comparison to "Wild Horses" by The Rolling Stones, feeling an "overheated romantic dialogue" and "similarly melodramatic" as in "Grenade", adding that the "real point is the song's desperately yearning melody." Vozick-Levinson ranked the single three out of five stars. PopDust compared the recording to "Grenade", "yet somehow...more dramatic". However, the song was "nothing if not competent" and Mars's vocals were praised. It was Mars's fourth-best single by that time if released "with no tie-in". The reviewer assured that the singer has done better in "dramatic and romantic" and by comparison it was "a gentle drizzle that comes and goes".

On the other hand, Tris McCall from NJ.com criticized the track for its "radio-friendliness", which is evident "from the digital echo on his voice to the sudden beat drop at the beginning of the second verse". Nevertheless, McCall admitted that "It Will Rain" was "another monster hit", and it had "genuine grit and emotional heft", notwithstanding, hard to find since it was "bathe[d]... in strings and marinate[d]... in backing vocals". Dallas Observer's Shahryar Rivzi gave a harsh critique of the recording saying that it was an "accessible way to present unrealistic ideas about romance". Its lyrics "present Bruno as either a vampire or a werewolf" and the "iffy drug reference" ("If you ever leave me, baby / leave some morphine at my door.") is a "relatively "safe" reference to drugs" and Mars "meant to ease the pain of losing the subject instead of making the user "realize"." Rivzi continued its criticism to the lyrics, "I'll pick up these broken pieces till I'm bleeding", resembles the "masochism" in "Grenade".

At the 2013 ASCAP Pop Music Awards it was one of the winners of Most Performed Songs. "It Will Rain" was nominated for Choice Music: Single by a Male Artist at the 2012 Teen Choice Awards.

== Commercial performance ==
In the United States, "It Will Rain" debuted on the Billboard Hot 100 at number 28. It is Mars's first soundtrack single to chart on the Hot 100. "It Will Rain" also entered at number 19 on the Adult Top 40 top twenty chart, eventually peaking at number three. It gradually climbed up the Hot 100 and peaked at number three. "It Will Rain" was successful on the Billboard pop charts, reaching number one on the Mainstream Top 40 chart. It placed at number 26 on the year-end ranking for Billboard Hot 100 in 2012. In Canada, "It Will Rain" was able to peak at number five on the Canadian Hot 100. Not only was certified five times platinum by the Recording Industry Association of America (RIAA), but it was also certified eight times platinum by Music Canada (MC).

In Australia, "It Will Rain" entered at number 22 on the ARIA Charts, and reached its peak of number 14 nine weeks after its debut, staying there for one week in total. It gradually descended down the charts, present within the top 50 for a total of 17 weeks. It was certified twice platinum by the Australian Recording Industry Association (ARIA) for shipment of 140,000 copies of the single. At the year-end tabulation, the song ranked at number 87 on the Singles chart. In New Zealand, "It Will Rain" debuted at number 28, it ascended the charts reaching the second spot of the chart, being kept of the first place by Rihanna and Calvin Harris' "We Found Love". The single gradually descended down the charts and was present for a total of 19 weeks. It was certified four times platinum by the Recorded Music NZ (RNMZ).

In the United Kingdom the song debuted at number 16, peaking at number 14, four weeks later, on the UK Singles Chart. The song spent 16 weeks on the singles chart and was certified platinum by the British Phonographic Industry (BPI). Across Europe, "It Will Rain" reached the top fifteen of the charts in Denmark, Finland, Germany, Ireland, Luxembourg, and Scotland. It received a platinum certification in Denmark for 90,000 copies. In South America, "It Will Rain", reached the top of Pop/Rock General chart in Venezuela. In South Korea, the song peaked at number 1 on the "International Download Chart". Its successful chart performance was noticed by NJ.com critic, Tris McCall, who said that "It Will Rain" was "inescapable" during the winter.

== Music video ==
The song's accompanying music video was directed by Phil Pinto and Mars. It was set to premiere on the night of October 26, 2011 exclusively on MTV, followed by a "special live-stream event" on MTV.com. However, two days before its suppose release, Mars announced, via Twitter, the music video had been delayed for some weeks, "Hey guys, I'm still working on the 'It Will Rain' video. The MTV premiere will happen in a couple weeks." It premiered on November 9, 2011 on MTV. Filming for the video took place in London, England, United Kingdom and features Mozambican and Portuguese model Vanessa Martins.

In the video Mars reminisces about the moments spent between him and his girlfriend in an "sparsely" decorated apartment. The singer expresses his emptiness and devastation recurring to solo shots in which he stands "around looking sullen" and by using "faded lighting" in order to convey such sentiments. Flashes of the two of them kissing, snuggling and pouring out romance are shown, as the singer apparently misses their relationship. After the opening sequence, Mars holds a private screening of "Breaking Dawn" to please her, the couple kiss in front of a cinema projector lights, while romantic scenes from the Breaking Dawn: Part 1, including the honeymoon and the one where Edward, played by Robert Pattinson, sweeps Bella, portrayed by Kristen Stewart, "off her feet and into their new home", are projected on the wall. As the video continues, the couple begins to fight, leading to more "heated arguments and lonely nights". At this point, Mars, possibly, writes a song to persuade her to stay with him. Nevertheless, MTV's, Jocelyn Vena stated "we see that the song Bruno wrote while his lady was asleep turned out to be romantic enough to win her back." In the final shot the singer is alone as rain pours down and hits the window behind him.

=== Reception ===
Upon its release, the video received mixed response from critics. Spin's William Goodman felt the clip was "as dramatic as the blockbuster vampire films themselves." However, he condemn it for only having the drama and a couple of scenes from the Twilight movie in common. Goodman described the music video as a "soap opera tale of a young couple struggling through a breakup, and revisiting all their good times in the process." David Greenwald of Billboard criticized the video for looking "more like a denim brand's lookbook than a peek at the vampire franchise's fourth film." At the 2012 MTV Video Music Awards Japan, the video was nominated in the categories of Best Male Video and Best Video from a Film, winning the former.

== Live performances and covers ==
Mars first performed "It Will Rain" with his band at The Ellen DeGeneres Show, on November 18, 2011. Mars wore a hat and sunglasses as props, signing while fog appeared "throughout the dimly-lit studio". Idolator's Becky Bain declared "the man proves again that he's got some killer pipes". Madison Vanderberg from Stereotude also praised the singers' voice "soulful croons and amazing voice". On the following week, the single was performed on the first season of the American X Factor, which for Mars would be one of his career highlights. The singer, who was wearing a fedora hat, raised his arms to the audience as the song started and a digital screen projecting a giant broken heart-shaped neon light as background appeared during the show.

Mars performed "It Will Rain" on The Doo-Wops & Hooligans Tour (2010–12), where it was the fourteenth song on the setlist. During the European leg, it was sung live with Skylar Grey. Becky Bain of Idolator noted that the two "have melancholia perfected". PopDust felt that "Grey's contribution is soft and minimal; it's all about Bruno and his rain-slick voice." the website concluded, "it's a shame that here, she feels so invisible". During The Moonshine Jungle Tour (2013–14), and his debut concert residency, Bruno Mars at The Chelsea, Las Vegas (2013–15), "It Will Rain" was interpolated with "If I Knew" of Mars's second studio album, Unorthodox Jukebox (2012), in most concerts. The single was part of some shows during the 24K Magic World Tour (2017–18) interpolated with "Nothin' on You" (2009), a song included on B.o.B's debut studio album B.o.B Presents: The Adventures of Bobby Ray (2010) featuring Mars. Starting on October 4, 2024, "It Will Rain" was added to the set list of Bruno Mars Live (2022-24).

American singer and songwriter Pia Mia, posted a video of herself singing the track on YouTube, before being signed in a label. American rock band Boyce Avenue made an acoustic version of the track, which was included on their album New Acoustic Sessions, Vol. 3, released on January 2, 2012. Ten days later, YouTuber Megan Nicole released her cover of the song as a single available for purchase. Another American singer and songwriter, Austin Mahone, record a cover of the song along with a music video. On February 10, 2013, Max Schneider released an album titled Schneider Brother Covers – Max Schneider, which contained a cover version of "It Will Rain" done by Kurt Hugo Schneider with Olivia Noelle. In 2015, DeAnna Johnson covered the song on The Voice.

== Track listing ==
Digital download
No.	Title	Length
1.	"It Will Rain"	4:17

CD single
No.	Title	Length
1.	"It Will Rain"	4:17

== Personnel ==
Credits adapted from the liner notes of The Twilight Saga: Breaking Dawn – Part 1 (soundtrack).

- Bruno Mars – lead vocals, songwriting
- Philip Lawrence – songwriting
- Ari Levine – songwriting, engineering
- The Smeezingtons – production
- Manny Marroquin – mixing
- Chris Galland – mixing assistant
- Erik Madrid – mixing assistant
- Phredley Brown – string arrangement
- Oscar Hidalgo – bass
- Suzie Katayama – conductor
- Andrew Duckles – viola
- Charlie Bisharat – violin
- Josefina Vergara – violin
- Stephen Marcussen – mastering

== Charts ==
=== Weekly charts ===
List of chart positions
Chart (2011–2012)	Peak position
Australia (ARIA)	14
Austria (Ö3 Austria Top 40)	25
Belgium (Ultratop 50 Flanders)	46
Belgium (Ultratip Bubbling Under Wallonia)	9
Canada Hot 100 (Billboard)	5
Canada AC (Billboard)	8
Canada CHR/Top 40 (Billboard)	5
Canada Hot AC (Billboard)	2
Denmark (Tracklisten)	11
Finland (Suomen virallinen lista)	15
France (SNEP)	58
Germany (GfK)	14
Hungary (Rádiós Top 40)	28
Ireland (IRMA)	11
Israel (Media Forest)	8
Italy (FIMI)	45
Japan Hot 100 (Billboard)	53
Lebanon (OLT20)	5
Luxembourg Digital Song Sales (Billboard)	5
Mexico (Billboard Mexican Airplay)	30
Mexico Anglo (Monitor Latino)	22
Netherlands (Dutch Top 40)	35
Netherlands (Single Top 100)	56
New Zealand (Recorded Music NZ)	2
Portugal Digital Songs Sales (Billboard)	6
Romania (Romanian Top 100)	21
Russia Airplay (TopHit)	27
Scottish Singles Sales (Official Charts)	15
South Korea International (Gaon)	1
Spain (Promusicae)	43
Sweden (Sverigetopplistan)	48
Switzerland (Schweizer Hitparade)	22
UK Singles (Official Charts)	14
Ukraine Airplay (TopHit)	28
US Billboard Hot 100	3
US Adult Contemporary (Billboard)	11
US Adult Pop Airplay (Billboard)	3
US Dance Airplay (Billboard)	19
US Hot Latin Songs (Billboard)	26
US Hot R&B/Hip-Hop Songs (Billboard)	83
US Pop Airplay (Billboard)	1
US Rhythmic Airplay (Billboard)	6
Venezuela Pop/Rock General (Record Report)	1

List of chart positions
Chart (2024)	Peak position
Brazil Hot 100 (Billboard)	73
Global 200 (Billboard)	168
Indonesia (Billboard)	18
Malaysia (Billboard)	15
Malaysia International (RIM)	13
Philippines (Philippines Hot 100)	28

List of chart performances
Chart (2026)	Peak position
Global 200 (Billboard)	108
Portugal (AFP)	157

=== Year-end charts ===
List of chart positions
Chart (2011)	Position
Australia (ARIA)	87
Germany (Official German Charts)	93
New Zealand (Recorded Music NZ)	29

List of Year-end charts
Chart (2012)	Position
Brazil (Crowley)	80
Canada (Canadian Hot 100)	28
Russia Airplay (TopHit)	156
Ukraine Airplay (TopHit)	28
US Billboard Hot 100	26
US Adult Contemporary (Billboard)	19
US Adult Top 40 (Billboard)	12
US Mainstream Top 40 (Billboard)	12
US Rhythmic (Billboard)	26

== Certifications ==
List of certifications
Region	Certification	Certified units/sales
Australia (ARIA)	2× Platinum	140,000^{^}
Canada (Music Canada)	8× Platinum	640,000^{‡}
Denmark (IFPI Danmark)	Platinum	90,000^{‡}
Germany (BVMI)	Gold	150,000^{‡}
Mexico (AMPROFON)	Platinum	60,000^{*}
New Zealand (RMNZ)	4× Platinum	120,000^{‡}
Portugal (AFP)	Platinum	10,000^{‡}
Spain (Promusicae)	Gold	30,000^{‡}
Switzerland (IFPI Switzerland)	Gold	15,000^{^}
United Kingdom (BPI)	Platinum	600,000^{‡}
United States (RIAA)	5× Platinum	5,000,000^{‡}
Streaming
Denmark (IFPI Danmark)	Gold	450,000^{†}
^{*} Sales figures based on certification alone.^{^} Shipments figures based on certification alone.^{‡} Sales+streaming figures based on certification alone.^{†} Streaming-only figures based on certification alone.

== Release history ==
List of release history, showing region(s), date(s), format(s) and label(s)
Country	Date	Format	Label	Ref.
Various	September 27, 2011	Digital download	Atlantic	
United States	October 4, 2011	Contemporary hit radio	Atlantic	
Italy	October 14, 2011	Radio airplay	Warner Music Group	
Germany	October 28, 2011	CD single	Elektra	
Austria	October 28, 2011	CD single	Elektra	
Switzerland	October 28, 2011	CD single	Elektra	
United Kingdom	October 31, 2011	Digital download	—N/a	

== See also ==
- List of Billboard Hot 100 top 10 singles in 2011
- List of Mainstream Top 40 number-one hits of 2012 (U.S.)
