= Marry You =

2011 single by Bruno Mars

Single by Bruno Mars

from the album Doo-Wops & Hooligans
- Released: August 22, 2011
- Genre: Pop; doo-wop; soul
- Length: 3:50
- Label: Warner
- Songwriters: Bruno Mars; Philip Lawrence; Ari Levine
- Producer: The Smeezingtons

Bruno Mars singles chronology
"Lighters" (2011)	"Marry You" (2011)	"Mirror" (2011)

Lyric video
- "Marry You" on YouTube

"Marry You" is a song by American singer and songwriter Bruno Mars from his debut studio album, Doo-Wops & Hooligans (2010). Written and produced by the Smeezingtons, it serves as the record's sixth track and was released as a single outside of the United States. "Marry You" is a pop, doo-wop and soul song. The recording focuses on spontaneous marriage and therefore, since its release, has frequently been used as a proposal song. "Marry You" received mixed reviews from music critics, with some complimenting its production and its reminiscence of 1960s pop style, while others criticized a perceived lack of creativity.

Despite not being released as a single in the US, the song charted at number 85 on the Billboard Hot 100. It entered the top ten of most international markets, reaching number ten on the Canadian Hot 100, number eight in Australia, and the top five in New Zealand. The single was certified seven times platinum by the Recording Industry Association of America (RIAA), four times platinum by the Recorded Music NZ (RNMZ), and diamond by Music Canada (MC). Mars has performed "Marry You" on all of his tours. The song has been covered a number of times, most notably by the cast of Glee; their cover outperformed the original song by reaching number 32 on the Hot 100.

== Background ==
"Marry You" is one of the eleven songs produced by the Smeezingtons, the collaboration of Bruno Mars, Philip Lawrence, and Ari Levine, for Mars's debut studio album, Doo-Wops & Hooligans. Lawrence explained the inspiration behind the song in an interview with American Songwriter stating, "[w]e had this image of a slow-mo video in Vegas of a couple running, and she's in her gown and he's in his tux, the wedding party is behind them. This sort of crazy, daring, wedding feeling". Lawrence was surprised at the impact of the song after watching some YouTube videos. He stated that "[w]e always thought it was a good song and catchy, but we didn't think it would affect pop culture the way that it has. The first time we saw one of those YouTube videos ... we were almost in tears ... the power of what it is we can create. These ideas, words, and lyrics and how they can get into the fabric of society and affect people's lives in such an amazing way."

In an interview with Idolator, Bruno Mars said that the song had its beginning by "just playing the chords," and then freestyling the lyrics "I think I wanna marry you!". He continued, "you're in Vegas ... had way too many drinks, and you love everybody, and you want to do something that you probably shouldn't do and you'll regret in the morning."

== Production and release ==
"Marry You" was written by Mars, Lawrence and Levine. The latter and Mars played all of the instruments on the track. Levine was also responsible for engineering the song at Levcon Studios. The single was mixed by Manny Marroquin and assistants Christian Plata and Erik Madrid at Larrabee Sound Studios in Los Angeles, California. It was mastered by Stephen Marcussen at Marcussen Mastering in Hollywood, California. On August 22, 2011, "Marry You" was released in the United Kingdom via digital download. On September 9, 2011, the single was issued for radio airplay in Italy by Warner Music Group. On September 13, 2011, the song was released in Germany by Warner Music Group.

== Composition ==
"Marry You"
A 23-second sample of the song features Mars singing about impulsive marriage.

"Marry You" combines elements of pop, doo-wop and soul. The song is composed in the key of F major with a tempo of 145 beats per minute, according to the sheet music at Musicnotes.com. It features double hand-claps, "rushing heartbeat of drums", echoing chiming church wedding bells and a sing-songy chorus. Mars's vocal range spans from C_{4} to D_{5}. His vocals in the song have been described as "plaintive" and "ach[ing] so gently", while wooing throughout the track. The song has been characterized as possessing a "forceful velocity" and an "instantly hummable melody". It was further described as "buoyant", "bubbly" and a "Motown marriage track".

"Marry You" is a "paean to getting tanked and then hitched to a pretty cynical appeal to man's baser behaviours." Ultimately a love song, lyrically describes a couple that go to Las Vegas, give up their "capricious impulses" and spontaneously gets married. The song became a "classic marriage tune", with Lawrence stating the writers meant to imply a "racy kind of idea". Critics compared the song to '60s pop and girl groups, to the "spacious drums" of Coldplay, and the "surf pop of The Beach Boys".

== Critical reception ==
"Marry You" received mixed reviews from music critics. Digital Spy's Lewis Corner gave it four out of five stars, saying the song "would not only impress the Elvis impersonator in any Vegas chapel, but is enough to make him a shoo-in for ultimate seducer of 2011" and a "60s-inspired jive-starter". Nina Baniamer of Contactmusic.com found the track's production "epic and ambitious" and called the "anthemic" song "sure fire hit". The Boston Globe critic Ken Capobianco praised the song for its "artfully arranged throwback" and exalted Mars's vocals. Leah Greenblatt, writing for Entertainment Weekly, stated that "Marry You" has "a malt-shop heart" beating beneath its "digital skin", which shows innovation and creativity. The Independent music critic, Andy Gill, flattered the single by calling it "overly ingratiating". Blues & Soul called the song "part 2" of "Just the Way You Are", stating that there is simplicity which culminates in "the perfect platform for Mars' angst ridden yearning vocals to ride over the top."

In a mixed review, Tim Sendra of Allmusic praised the song's "dynamic and nuanced production", finding the track "pleasantly silly". The Scotsman affirmed the track shows Mars at his best and worst, "his facility for a jolly tune and catchy but disposable rhyming couplets". In a negative review, Mike Diver of BBC Music thought confessed that the recording was a "too-clingy and very creepy love song" and noted its lack of inspiration. Similarly, Slant Magazine's Eric Henderson suggested that the song was spun off of Cee Lo Green's "Forget You", where the word "fuck" was changed to "marry". He further added that the single was a "bizarrely syncopated piledriver".

In September 2024, Billboard's Kyle Dines affirmed that "Marry You" was one "of the young decade's earliest surefire wedding anthems". In February 2026, Maya Georgi from Rolling Stone said the song featured as the soundtrack to "many a marriage proposal and wedding".

== Commercial performance ==
In the United States, "Marry You" debuted at number 91 on the Billboard Hot 100 on December 11, 2010. It reached a peak of number 85 on January 15, 2011, and remained on the chart for a total of 5 weeks. The song was never released as a single in the United States, despite its strong airplay on mainstream and adult top 40 radio stations. As of January 2015, the track had sold 2.2 million copies in the United States. It was certified seven times platinum by the Recording Industry Association of America (RIAA).

The song's reception was stronger outside of the United States. "Marry You" reached its peak position of number 10 on the Canadian Hot 100 in early November 2011. It is certified diamond by Music Canada (MC). In the United Kingdom, "Marry You" debuted and peaked at number 11 on the UK Singles Chart and remained on the chart for 39 weeks. It was certified three times platinum by the British Phonographic Industry (BPI). The single performed well across the rest of Europe, reaching the top 10 in Austria, Czech Republic, Ireland, Luxembourg, and Slovakia, and the top 20 in Belgium, Germany, Netherlands, and Switzerland. In 2014, the song re-entered the Spanish Charts two years after its first appearance, reaching a new peak of 26. It also peaked at number 34 on the Danish Charts and was certified double platinum by the IFPI Denmark. Despite never entering the Italian Single Charts, it was certified platinum by the Federazione Industria Musicale Italiana (FIMI).

In Australia, "Marry You" debuted at number 50 on the ARIA Singles Chart on December 12, 2010 and remained on the chart for three weeks. It reappeared on the chart on June 19, 2011, reaching a peak position at number 8 for two non-consecutive weeks; it dropped off the chart after 19 weeks. The single was certified double platinum by the Australian Recording Industry Association (ARIA) in 2011. The single reached number 5 on New Zealand's Official Singles Chart, spent five months on the chart and was certified four times platinum by Recorded Music NZ (RMNZ). In Asia, the song peaked at number 67 on the Japan Hot 100, and was awarded gold by the Recording Industry Association of Japan (RIAJ). The single reached number 12 in South Korea.

== Live performances and covers ==
Mars has performed the song at several shows, first at the Bowery Ballroom in New York City on August 25, 2010. On November 6, 2011, Mars and his band performed it live at the 2011 MTV Europe Music Awards. He also sang it on December 8, 2012 for the 2012 edition of Jingle Bell Ball, an event annually held and promoted by Capital FM at the O2 Arena in London. Mars performed it during his debut world tour, The Doo-Wops & Hooligans Tour (2010–12) and on the Hooligans in Wondaland Tour (2011). He also sang it during The Moonshine Jungle Tour (2013–14) and on his debut concert residency, Bruno Mars at The Chelsea, Las Vegas (2013–15). It was also part of the setlist of the 24K Magic World Tour (2017–18) and of Bruno Mars Live (2022-2024).

The song has been covered several times, first on the "Furt" episode of the television show Glee, which aired on November 23, 2010. The show's cover version achieved moderate success by peaking at number 19 in Canada and number 32 in the United States. It reached number 27 in Australia and number 31 in Ireland. On January 1, 2013, the song was covered by Sunny, Sooyoung, and Yoona of South Korean girl group Girls' Generation for their comeback special, Girls' Generation's Romantic Fantasy. Rapper and actor Donald Glover, who performs music under the stage name Childish Gambino, sang a cover of the song in the film Magic Mike XXL. The cover appeared on the movie's soundtrack album, which was released on June 30, 2015. In 2020, American singer-songwriter Brynn Elliott, Christian Lalama and Forest Blakk covered "Marry You", in different instances, as part of the tenth anniversary of Mars's debut album.

== Personnel ==
Credits adapted from the liner notes of Doo-Wops & Hooligans.

- Bruno Mars – lead vocals, songwriting, instrumentation
- Philip Lawrence – songwriting
- Ari Levine – songwriting, instrumentation, engineering
- The Smeezingtons – production
- Manny Marroquin – mixing
- Erik Madrid – mixing assistant
- Christian Plata – mixing assistant
- Stephen Marcussen – mastering

== Charts ==
=== Weekly charts ===
List of chart positions
Chart (2010–2012)	Peak position
Australia (ARIA)	8
Austria (Ö3 Austria Top 40)	4
Belgium (Ultratop 50 Flanders)	11
Belgium (Ultratop 50 Wallonia)	19
Canada Hot 100 (Billboard)	10
Canada AC (Billboard)	1
Canada CHR/Top 40 (Billboard)	31
Canada Hot AC (Billboard)	29
Czech Republic Airplay (ČNS IFPI)	1
France (SNEP)	51
Germany (GfK)	15
Germany Airplay (BVMI)	1
Hungary (Rádiós Top 40)	24
Ireland (IRMA)	5
Israel International Airplay (Media Forest)	1
Italy (FIMI)	33
Japan Hot 100 (Billboard)	67
Lebanon Airplay (The Official Lebanese Top 20)	15
Luxembourg Digital Songs Sales (Billboard)	6
Mexico (Billboard Ingles Airplay)	29
Netherlands (Dutch Top 40)	13
Netherlands (Single Top 100)	22
New Zealand (Recorded Music NZ)	5
Slovakia Airplay (ČNS IFPI)	1
South Korea International Singles (Gaon)	15
Spain (Promusicae)	30
Switzerland (Schweizer Hitparade)	16
UK Singles (Official Charts)	11
UK Hip Hop/R&B (Official Charts)	3
US Billboard Hot 100	85

List of chart positions
Chart (2014–2022)	Peak position
Spain (Promusicae)	26
Denmark (Tracklisten)	32
Poland Airplay (ZPAV)	57

List of chart position
Chart (2023–2024)	Peak position
Singapore (RIAS)	23

List of chart positions for Glee version
Chart (2010)	Peak position
Australia (ARIA)	27
Canada Hot 100 (Billboard)	19
Ireland (IRMA)	31
US Billboard Hot 100	32

=== Year-end charts ===
List of chart positions
Chart (2011)	Position
Australia (ARIA)	32
Austria (Ö3 Austria Top 40)	58
Belgium (Ultratop 50 Flanders)	76
Canada (Canadian Hot 100)	70
Germany (Media Control AG)	99
Israel (Media Forest)	32
Japan (Japan Hot 100)	89
Netherlands (Dutch Top 40)	58
Netherlands (Single Top 100)	96
New Zealand (Record Music NZ)	39

List of chart position
Chart (2012)	Position
France (SNEP)	170

== Certifications ==
List of certifications
Region	Certification	Certified units/sales
Australia (ARIA)	2× Platinum	140,000^{^}
Austria (IFPI Austria)	Gold	15,000^{*}
Belgium (BRMA)	Gold	15,000^{*}
Canada (Music Canada)	Diamond	800,000^{‡}
Denmark (IFPI Danmark)	2× Platinum	180,000^{‡}
France (SNEP)	Platinum	200,000^{‡}
Germany (BVMI)	Platinum	600,000^{‡}
Italy (FIMI)	Platinum	50,000^{‡}
Japan (RIAJ)	Gold	100,000^{*}
Mexico (AMPROFON)	Gold	30,000^{*}
New Zealand (RMNZ)	4× Platinum	120,000^{‡}
Spain (Promusicae)	Platinum	60,000^{‡}
Switzerland (IFPI Switzerland)	Gold	15,000^{^}
United Kingdom (BPI)	3× Platinum	1,800,000^{‡}
United States (RIAA)	7× Platinum	7,000,000^{‡}
Streaming
Denmark (IFPI Danmark)	Gold	450,000^{†}
Japan (RIAJ)	Platinum	100,000,000^{†}
^{*} Sales figures based on certification alone.^{^} Shipments figures based on certification alone.^{‡} Sales+streaming figures based on certification alone.^{†} Streaming-only figures based on certification alone.

== Release history ==
List of release history showing region(s), date(s), format(s) and label
Region	Date	Format	Label	Ref.
United Kingdom	August 22, 2011	Digital Download	Unknown	
Italy	September 9, 2011	Radio airplay	Warner Music Group	
Germany	September 13, 2011	Unknown	Warner Music Group	
