= Doo-Wops & Hooligans =

2010 studio album by Bruno Mars

Studio album by Bruno Mars
- Released: October 4, 2010
- Genres: Pop; reggae pop; R&B
- Length: 35:27
- Labels: Atlantic; Elektra
- Producers: The Smeezingtons; Needlz; Supa Dups

Bruno Mars chronology
It's Better If You Don't Understand (2010)	Doo-Wops & Hooligans (2010)	Unorthodox Jukebox (2012)

Singles from Doo-Wops & Hooligans
- 1. "Just the Way You Are" Released: July 20, 2010; 2. "Grenade" Released: October 2010; 3. "The Lazy Song" Released: February 15, 2011; 4. "Talking to the Moon" Released: April 12, 2011; 5. "Marry You" Released: August 22, 2011; 6. "Count On Me" Released: November 7, 2011

Doo-Wops & Hooligans is the debut studio album by the American singer-songwriter Bruno Mars. It was released on October 4, 2010, by Atlantic and Elektra Records and was made available to listen before its official release on September 24, 2010. After the release of the EP It's Better If You Don't Understand, Mars's writing and production team, the Smeezingtons, began working on the album with Needlz, Supa Dups, and Jeff Bhasker as producers. The album title was chosen to reflect simplicity and appeal to both men and women.

Doo-Wops & Hooligans draws on a variety of influences. Lyrically, the album visualizes carefree optimism along with failed relationships, pain, and loneliness. Doo-Wops & Hooligans received generally favorable reviews from music critics, who praised the album's similarity to the work of American artists Michael Jackson and Jason Mraz, although others felt that the album tried too hard to appeal to all groups. About.com's Bill Lamb and Rolling Stone's Jody Rosen called Doo-Wops & Hooligans one of the year's best debut albums.

Doo-Wops & Hooligans topped the charts in Canada, Ireland, the Netherlands, Switzerland, and the United Kingdom. It peaked at number three on the Billboard 200 albums chart and was certified nine-times platinum by the Recording Industry Association of America (RIAA), nine-times platinum by the Recorded Music NZ (RMNZ), eight-times platinum by Australian Recording Industry Association (ARIA), eight-times platinum by the British Phonographic Industry (BPI), and diamond by Music Canada (MC). As of 2020, the album has sold over 15 million copies globally. The first two singles, "Just the Way You Are" and "Grenade" were successful internationally, topping the charts in the United States, Australia, Canada, New Zealand, and the United Kingdom. Subsequent singles "The Lazy Song", which topped the charts in the United Kingdom and Denmark, and "Marry You" reached the top ten in over ten countries. "Talking to the Moon" and "Count On Me" had a limited release.

At the 53rd Annual Grammy Awards in 2011, "Just the Way You Are" received a Grammy Award in the Best Male Pop Vocal Performance category. Doo-Wops & Hooligans received five nominations for the 54th Annual Grammy Awards in 2012, including Album of the Year, Best Pop Vocal Album, Record of the Year, and Song of the Year for the single "Grenade". It was promoted primarily through the Doo-Wops & Hooligans Tour (2010–2012) and a co-headline tour with Janelle Monáe, called Hooligans in Wondaland Tour (2011), along with a number of television appearances.

== Background and development ==
After the release of the hit singles "Nothin' on You" and "Billionaire", the Smeezingtons (a songwriting and record-producing trio consisting of Bruno Mars, Philip Lawrence and Ari Levine) were asked to begin working on Mars's debut album, having a six-month deadline. "The demand changed", leaving them with one month to finish the album. While establishing himself as a composer and artist, Mars worked with several artists and spent long periods of time in the recording studio "figuring out the production and the writing process"; he believed that "it was training for me to put out my own album." In early September 2010, Doo-Wops & Hooligans was being mixed by Manny Marroquin at Larrabee Studios.

Mars said about the album title, "I have records that women are going to relate to and men are going to relate to. So doo-wops are for the girls, and hooligans are for the guys." He elaborated in several interviews: "I grew up listening to my dad, who loved doo-wop music"; those sounds are "straight to the point" and simple; they rely on a "beautiful melody and voice", representing his romantic side. Due to his youth, he also liked to party (indicating his hooligan side). Mars said in an MTV News interview that he had completed his debut album. His debut EP, It's Better If You Don't Understand, released earlier in the year, provided "a little taste of what's in store".

In addition to writing the lyrics, the Smeezingtons produced the album with songwriters and other producers. Among them were Needlz and Khalil Walton, who helped compose "Just the Way You Are" by exchanging files. Mars said that the single took him months to create, even though he was only trying to tell a story and it was nothing "deep or poetic". "The Lazy Song", the fifth track, was inspired by a lack of ideas for songs and a disinclination to work. "Marry You", according to Lawrence, was drawn from a spontaneous marriage in Las Vegas. The bonus track, "Somewhere in Brooklyn", was inspired by Mars's father and New York. In the song, a female character is in Brooklyn and the singer is trying to find her.

== Composition ==
Doo-Wops & Hooligans is primarily a pop, reggae pop and R&B album, also having soul, reggae and rock influences. The album was compared to works by Michael Jackson and Jason Mraz. "Just the Way You Are", "Marry You" and "Runaway Baby" are uptempo songs; the former is an optimistic ballad, with yearning falsetto vocals influenced by U2. "Marry You" is a pop song about a spontaneous marriage idea, and "Runaway Baby" has a funky pop-rock and soul beat. "Marry You" is reminiscent of Coldplay, and "Runaway Baby" evokes Little Richard. "The Lazy Song", another uptempo song, is a reggae track described as an anthem "to sloth" and a "surf stoner's" borrowing from Sugar Ray. The second single, "Grenade", is a darker song with a masochistic message channeling Michael Jackson's "Dirty Diana", Kanye West's production and Shakira's style.

One of the album's promotional singles, "Liquor Store Blues", is a reggae track fusing Michael Jackson with Bedouin Soundclash; the single "Count On Me" is a friendship anthem which channels Israel Kamakawiwoʻole's "Over the Rainbow". The third track, "Our First Time", has been compared to the work of Boyz II Men, Al B. Sure!, D'Angelo and Sade. and is a reggae and R&B song. "Talking to the Moon" is a power ballad expressing the singer's pain and loneliness, primarily in the chorus. The last track, "The Other Side", features B.o.B and CeeLo Green. It has been called the album's highlight, with its most experimental and complex production. "Somewhere in Brooklyn", which was only released in Germany as a promotional single, was included as a bonus track on several Doo-Wops & Hooligans editions.

== Singles ==
"Just the Way You Are" was released digitally as the album's lead single in various countries on July 20, 2010. The song was critically acclaimed, with reviewers praising its piano balladry and romantic lyrics. It topped the charts in the United States, Australia, New Zealand, the Netherlands and the United Kingdom, and reached the top ten in several other countries. "Just the Way You Are" received a Grammy Award in the Best Male Pop Vocal Performance category at the 53rd Annual Grammy Awards.

"Grenade", the album's second single, had been premiered as its second (and last) promotional single on September 28, 2010, before its stand-alone release in October 2010. It was also well received by critics, most of whom praised Mars's vocals. The single surpassed "Just the Way You Are"'s success, topping the charts in nearly every country where it was released. The song was his third number-one on the Hot 100. In 2012, "Grenade" received three Grammy nominations at the 54th Annual Grammy Awards: Record of the Year, Song of the Year and Best Pop Solo Performance.

"The Lazy Song", was issued as the album's third single on February 15, 2011. It received mixed reviews. Some critics though it had a laid-back groove; others called it "filler", with empty lyrics which were an embarrassment to the album. The song topped the charts in the United Kingdom and Denmark, reached the top five in the US, Austria, Canada and New Zealand. Its music video was a single, long shot of Mars playing with five monkeys. An alternate video features Leonard Nimoy on his lazy daily routine.

"Talking to the Moon" was released as a single only in Brazil after it appeared on the 2011 soundtrack of the Brazilian telenovela, Insensato Coração (Irrational Heart). The song topped the Billboard Brasil Hot Pop & Popular and the Brasil Hot 100 Airplay charts. It spent nine weeks at number one on the latter chart, and topped the former chart for 22 weeks. The song received mixed reviews from critics, who praised its slow pace and lyrics but criticized its overwhelming production.

"Marry You" was not released as a single in the United States, despite considerable airplay on mainstream and adult top-40 radio stations. However, it was first released in the United Kingdom on August 22, 2011, via digital download. The song was praised for its "instantly hummable melody and a sing-songy chorus", reminiscent of 1960s pop. It reached the top ten in Australia, Canada and New Zealand.

"Count On Me" was announced as the sixth single, with a radio release date of November 7, 2011, in Australia. The song reached the top ten in Austria, Portugal and Spain, and the top twenty in Australia and New Zealand. It was praised for its arrangement and "uplifting" vibe, and compared with "Over The Rainbow" by Israel Kamakawiwoʻole.

== Release and promotion ==
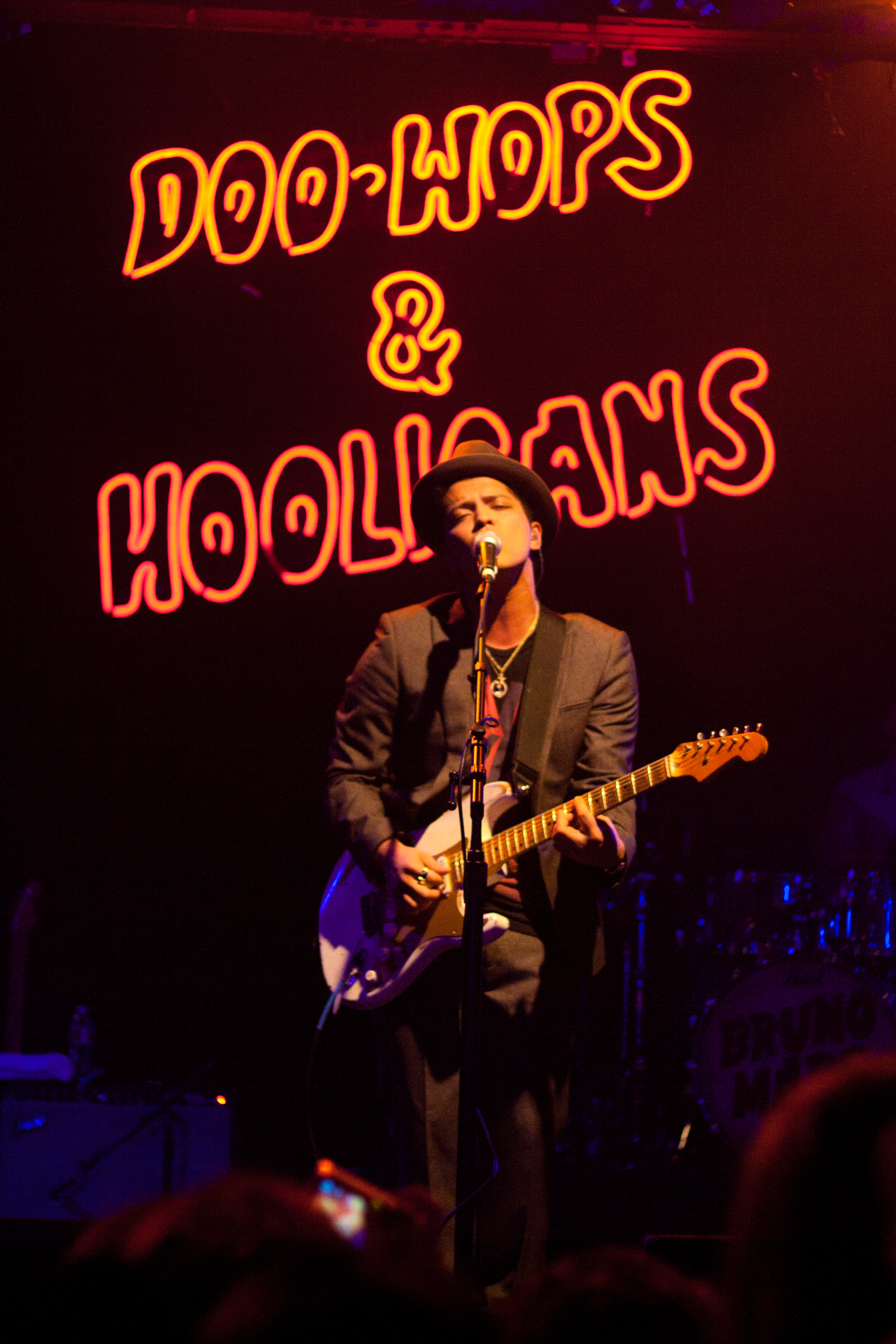
Bruno Mars performing in Houston, Texas, on November 24, 2010, during the Doo-Wops & Hooligans Tour.

The release of Doo-Wops & Hooligans was announced on August 25, 2010, with T-shirts, a screen-printed poster autographed and hand-numbered by Mars and photos of the singer included in the first 500 preorders. Its cover art was released five days later. The track listing, which included three of the four songs from Mars's EP, was announced by Atlantic Records on September 9. The album's standard edition was released in the US on October 4, 2010. A deluxe edition was also released, which included a remix of "Just the Way You Are" featuring Lupe Fiasco and "Somewhere in Brooklyn" (originally from It's Better If You Don't Understand) and the music videos of "Just the Way You Are" and "The Other Side". Other versions were released, culminating in the Japanese Platinum Edition.

On September 21, 2010, "Liquor Store Blues" featuring Damian Marley (the first of three promotional singles) was released in various countries. Three days later, the album was made available to listen before its official release on Myspace. "Grenade" was released as the second promotional single on September 28, 2010, via iTunes. The third promotional single, "Somewhere in Brooklyn", was released in Germany on January 4, 2011. "Runaway Baby" was performed at several shows, including The X Factor, the 54th Annual Grammy Awards and the Super Bowl XLVIII halftime show. The performances were praised by several critics, and the song charted in the US, New Zealand and the UK.

To promote the album, Mars gave several performances. The first, with his four-piece band, was at the Bowery Ballroom in New York City on August 25, 2010. In early October he performed "Just The Way You Are" and a medley of "Nothing On You" and "Grenade" for the first time on national television on Saturday Night Live, and received a positive critical reaction. This was followed by The Ellen DeGeneres Show, a Billboard Tastemakers video session and Mars's debut performance of "The Lazy Song" on Kidd Kraddick's radio show. Atlantic Records allowed the musical television series Glee to cover "Just the Way You Are" and "Marry You" in November 2010, and Mars sang "Grenade" on the Late Show with David Letterman that month. An acoustic version of "Just the Way You Are" was performed at the Grammy Nominations concert in December 2010 for the 53rd Annual Grammy Awards.

Mars began the fall leg of Maroon 5's Palm Trees & Power Lines Tour, opening shows with OneRepublic, on October 6, 2010, in Santa Barbara, California. He then supported Travie McCoy on his European tour from mid-October to early November. The album was promoted by the Doo-Wops & Hooligans Tour, Mars's first headlining concert tour, which started on November 16 in San Francisco. Its second leg, from January to March 2011, consisted of concerts in Europe and was followed by dates in Asia and Oceania. Dates for the former tour in Europe, the Caribbean and South America were added. Mars concluded the tour on January 28, 2012, in Florianópolis, Brazil. In early 2011, a co-headline tour with Janelle Monáe, called Hooligans in Wondaland Tour, was announced. The concert tour was performed in North America in May and June 2011.

On October 2, 2020, Atlantic Records announced they would be celebrating the tenth anniversary of Doo-Wops & Hooligans. The music videos of the album were remastered in 4K Ultra HD, and six brand new lyric videos were released. The label also made Doo-Wops & Hooligans merchandise available for purchase for a limited time on Mars's official webstore. Moreover, the album will be made available in a limited yellow vinyl edition, exclusively via Walmart, on November 27, 2020. Several Atlantic Records' artists covered songs from the album as part of its tenth anniversary. In October 2025, the label announced they would be celebrating the fifteenth anniversary of Doo-Wops & Hooligans with a Limited Edition Transparent Yellow Galaxy Vinyl. Alongside, a limited edition poster, shirt and tee were available for purchase.

== Critical reception ==
Doo-Wops & Hooligans ratings
Aggregate scores
Source	Rating
AnyDecentMusic?	4.9/10
Metacritic	61/100
Review scores
Source	Rating
AllMusic	3/5 stars
Consequence	B−
The Daily Telegraph	4/5 stars
Entertainment Weekly	B+
The Guardian	2/5 stars
The Independent	3/5 stars
The New Zealand Herald	3/5
Q	2/5 stars
Rolling Stone	3.5/5 stars
Slant Magazine	2.5/5 stars

Doo-Wops & Hooligans was met with generally favorable reviews from music critics. At Metacritic, the album received an average score of 61, based on 13 reviews. Aggregator AnyDecentMusic? gave Doo-Wops & Hooligans 4.9 out of 10, based on their assessment of the critical consensus.

Leah Greenblatt of Entertainment Weekly gave Doo-Wops & Hooligans a B+ grade. Greenblatt praised Mars's "instant-access melodies", "creamy" productions and "sly snatches of dance-floor swagger", but said that some of the album's musical styles did not suit the singer. Alex Young of Consequence called Doo-Wops & Hooligans "fulfilling [with] very few holes", giving the album a B− grade but calling Mars's vocals "gold". The Daily Telegraph's Tom Gockelen-Kozlowski wrote that the album had a "bundle of top-drawer melodies, making commercial success all but a certainty" and gave it four stars out of five. Jody Rosen of Rolling Stone called it "the year's finest debut" with "10 near-perfect" tracks, and gave the album three-and-a-half start out of five. According to Rosen, its songs "deliver pleasure without pretension". Rosen and The Boston Globe's Ken Capobianco praised Mars's vocal performance and talent for composing melodies. Although Capobianco found the debut album "promising", he was disappointed by its lack of self-revelation. Sean Fennessey of The Washington Post called it "effortlessly tuneful" and a good start to a "durable career". The New York Times's Jon Caramanica described Doo-Wops & Hooligans as a "fantastically polyglot record that shows him to be a careful study across a range of pop songcraft" and praised its range of influences.

In a mixed review, Tim Sendra of AllMusic praised most of the songs for their "laid-back groove" but found that the quality dropped when Mars "turns up the volume and boosts the tempo". Sendra gave the album three stars out of five, calling it "an uneven debut ... [that] doesn't tap into his potential as a writer or a producer". Scott Kara of The New Zealand Herald enjoyed the album's first two tracks, but wrote that the rest could have had more "potency" and rated Doo-Wops & Hooligans three out of five. Tony Clayton-Lea of The Irish Times wrote that the record is "full of the kind of catchy modern pop that is impossible to dislike or dislodge ... most of the tunes are cocktail bangers hot enough to melt ice." According to The Independent's Andy Gill, the album "seeks too hard to display Mars' multifaceted talents".

Eric Henderson criticized Doo-Wops & Hooligans in Slant Magazine, saying that it "manages to wear out its welcome about halfway through" and calling it an attempt to "please just about everybody." He gave the album two-and-a-half stars out of 5. With the same rating, Jamie Milton of MusicOMH wrote that it "involves throwing everything into the fire", "a contrast taken too far". Milton called it (in common with other debut albums) "opportunistic ... regardless of any forthcoming trends in pop, there's a song on the album pitched to take grasp of it all." A Q reviewer who gave the album two out of five stars wrote, "Mostly, he has little to say." The Guardian's Alexis Petridis also gave it two out of five stars due to Mars's "saccharine sound" and poor lyrical composition. According to Petridis, the album should have been more "groundbreaking". The Scotsman and Mike Diver of the BBC said that Mars could have made an album for mass appreciation. The Scotsman reviewer wished that Mars had recorded something more "sophisticated"; Diver said that the album is not suitable for "anyone with life and love experience beyond passing notes around at the back of class".

In September 2024, Billboard's Kyle Denis affirmed that Doo-Wops & Hooligans has various well-known "deep-cuts" by a major audience that weren't officially promoted as U.S. radio singles. These songs include "Runaway Baby", "Count on Me", "Marry You" and "Talking to The Moon".

=== Accolades ===
The album's lead single, "Just The Way You Are", received the Best Male Pop Vocal Performance award at the 53rd Annual Grammy Awards in 2011 and received the Top Radio Song award at the 2011 Billboard Music Awards. Doo-Wops & Hooligans was nominated for the International Album of the Year award at the 2011 Danish GAFFA Awards, Best Album Pop Rock International at the 2012 Swiss Music Awards, and received two nominations (Best Pop Vocal Album and Album of the Year) at the 54th Annual Grammy Awards in 2012. The album's second single, "Grenade", received three nominations (Record of the Year, Song of the Year and Best Pop Solo Performance) for the 2012 Grammys.

Rolling Stone's Jody Rosen and Bill Lamb of About.com called the album one of the year's best debuts. Lamb praised Mars's vocals and most of the melodies as "surefire", calling Mars a "creative artist" and saying that on his next album the singer could "stretch the horizons further and deliver truly memorable songs". Rosen described the songs as "near-perfect", "mov[ing] from power ballads to bedroom anthems ... Call it bubblegum that eats like a meal." In November 2013, the Doo-Wops & Hooligans artwork designed by Nick Bilardello was 31st on Complex' "50 Best Pop Album Covers of the Past Five Years". Susan Cheng wrote that Mars would have an enduring career, as "depicted in the path left behind by a black jet on the cover" of the album, whose "sunny hues convey a sense of self-confidence and the singer's outlook on the road ahead ... the silhouette in the lower right, presumably a representation of Bruno Mars, reveals humility in the wake of so much success."

== Commercial performance ==
Doo-Wops & Hooligans debuted (and peaked) at number three on the Billboard 200, with sales of 55,000 on its October 13, 2010, issue date in the United States. It topped Billboard's Top Catalog Albums chart; it remained at number one for 11 weeks, surpassing Bob Marley and the Wailers' compilation album Legend (1984) for the most weeks at number one in 2013. The album had the second-longest stretch at number one for a male artist, behind Michael Jackson's 2003 greatest-hits album Number Ones (19 weeks). During the week of February 5, 2014 (after Mars's Grammy appearance and performance at the Super Bowl XLVIII halftime show), sales of Doo-Wops & Hooligans increased by 303% and it rebounded to number 19 on the Billboard 200. As of July 2017, it sold 2,626,000 million copies in the United States by July 2017. The album was certified nine-times platinum by the Recording Industry Association of America (RIAA).

As of January 6, 2021, Doo-Wops & Hooligans spent 500 weeks on the Billboard 200, becoming the ninth title to reach the aforementioned weeks. Doo-Wops & Hooligans is also the longest-running debut album on the aforementioned chart. According to the RIAA, the album was the ninth highest certified album of the 2010s decade. As of October 2026, the album has spent 800 weeks on the Billboard 200 chart. Its the first debut album to reach this mark and Mars the only solo artist in to have a studio album with 800 weeks.

In Canada, it debuted at number six. After fluctuating on the chart, the album reached number one four months later on February 5, 2011. It has been certified diamond platinum by Music Canada. The album debuted at number five, peaked at number two and was certified twelve-times platinum in New Zealand by the Recorded Music NZ. It debuted at number seven in Australia, peaked at number two and was certified eight-times platinum by the Australian Recording Industry Association (ARIA) for 560,000 equivalent copies.

Doo-Wops & Hooligans debuted in the United Kingdom at number 79 on October 24, 2010. On the week of December 12, 2011, the album sold 60,740 copies, becoming the second album to sell a million copies that year by a male artist. On its first chart week of 2011, it replaced Rihanna's Loud at number one and spent another week atop the chart. Doo-Wops & Hooligans was 2011's second million-selling album in the UK. It was the year's third-bestselling album, with sales of 1.2 million copies. As of November 2016, the album sold 1,712,000 copies and in 2025 it was certified eight-times platinum by the British Phonographic Industry (BPI). The album has spent a total of 400 weeks on the United Kingdom's official albums chart, becoming Mars's longest running album. It debuted atop the Irish and Scottish album charts and it was certified four-times platinum by the Irish Recorded Music Association (IRMA).

In the Philippines, Doo-Wops & Hooligans received a double-diamond certification from the Philippine Association of the Record Industry (PARI) in 2014 for sales of 300,000 copies and is the country's tenth-best-selling album. As of December 2011, the record sold 36,200 copies in Taiwan. It topped the charts in Flanders, Croatia, the Netherlands, Germany and Switzerland. The album sold 700,000 copies in Germany, and was certified septuple gold by the BVMI. It reached the top 10 in Austria, Denmark, Finland, Mexico, Norway, Poland, Portugal, Spain and Sweden, and was certified seven-times platinum by IFPI Danmark. By 2021, Doo-Wops & Hooligans had sold more than 15 million copies worldwide.

== Track listing ==
Doo-Wops & Hooligans standard edition
No.	Title	Writer(s)	Producer(s)	Length
1.	"Grenade"	Bruno Mars; Philip Lawrence; Ari Levine; Brody Brown; Claude Kelly; Andrew Wyatt	The Smeezingtons	3:42
2.	"Just the Way You Are"	Mars; Lawrence; Levine; Khalil Walton; Khari Cain	The Smeezingtons; Needlz	3:40
3.	"Our First Time"	Mars; Lawrence; Levine; Dwayne Chin-quee; Mitchum Chin	The Smeezingtons; Dwayne "Supa Dups" Chin-quee	4:03
4.	"Runaway Baby"	Mars; Lawrence; Levine; Brown	The Smeezingtons	2:27
5.	"The Lazy Song"	Mars; Lawrence; Levine; K'naan	The Smeezingtons	3:15
6.	"Marry You"	Mars; Lawrence; Levine	The Smeezingtons	3:50
7.	"Talking to the Moon"	Mars; Lawrence; Levine; Albert Winkler; Jeff Bhasker	The Smeezingtons; Bhasker^{[a]}	3:37
8.	"Liquor Store Blues" (featuring Damian Marley)	Mars; Lawrence; Levine; Chin-quee; Chin; Marley; Thomas Pentz	The Smeezingtons; Chin-quee	3:49
9.	"Count On Me"	Mars; Lawrence; Levine	The Smeezingtons	3:17
10.	"The Other Side" (featuring CeeLo Green and B.o.B)	Mars; Lawrence; Levine; Brown; Mike Caren; Patrick Stump; Kaveh Rastegar; John Wicks; Jeremy Ruzumna; Joshua Lopez; Bobby Simmons, Jr.	The Smeezingtons	3:47
Total length:				35:27

European bonus tracks
No.	Title	Writer(s)	Producer(s)	Length
11.	"Somewhere in Brooklyn"	Mars; Lawrence; Levine	The Smeezingtons	3:01
12.	"Talking to the Moon" (Acoustic Piano Version)	Mars; Lawrence; Levine; Winkler; Bhasker	The Smeezingtons; Bhasker^{[a]}	3:37

iTunes Store deluxe version bonus tracks
No.	Title	Writer(s)	Producer(s)	Length
11.	"Just the Way You Are (Remix)" (featuring Lupe Fiasco)	Mars; Lawrence; Levine; Walton; Cain	The Smeezingtons; Needlz	3:58
12.	"Somewhere in Brooklyn"	Mars; Lawrence; Levine	The Smeezingtons	3:01
13.	"Just the Way You Are" (Music video)			3:56
14.	"The Other Side" (featuring CeeLo Green and B.o.B) (Music video)			3:46

Deluxe/Tour edition
No.	Title	Writer(s)	Producer(s)	Length
11.	"Just the Way You Are" (featuring Lupe Fiasco)	Mars; Lawrence; Levine; Walton; Cain	The Smeezingtons; Needlz	3:58
12.	"Somewhere in Brooklyn"	Mars; Lawrence; Levine	The Smeezingtons	3:01
13.	"Talking to the Moon" (Acoustic Piano Version)	Mars; Lawrence; Levine; Winkler; Bhasker	The Smeezingtons; Bhasker^{[a]}	3:37
14.	"Just the Way You Are" (Walmart Soundcheck Version) (Live)	Mars; Lawrence; Levine; Walton; Cain		4:28
15.	"Grenade" (Walmart Soundcheck Version) (Live)	Mars; Lawrence; Levine; Brown; Kelly; Wyatt		4:37
16.	"The Other Side" (Walmart Soundcheck Version) (Live)	Mars; Lawrence; Levine; Brown; Caren; Stump; Rastegar; Wicks; Ruzumna; Lopez; Simmons, Jr.		2:59

Japanese platinum edition
No.	Title	Writer(s)	Producer(s)	Length
17.	"Grenade" (The Hooligans Remix)	Mars; Lawrence; Levine; Brown; Kelly; Wyatt	The Smeezingtons; The Hooligans (Remix)	3:30
18.	"Grenade" (Passion Pit Remix)	Mars; Lawrence; Levine; Brown; Kelly; Wyatt	The Smeezingtons; Passion Pit (Remix)	6:10
19.	"Grenade" (Dexpistols Remix)	Mars; Lawrence; Levine; Brown; Kelly; Wyatt	The Smeezingtons; Dexpistols (Remix)	4:19

- ^{^[a]} Co-producer

== Personnel ==
Credits adapted from the liner notes of Doo-Wops & Hooligans.

Technical and composing credits

- The Smeezingtons – executive producer, production
- Bruno Mars – vocals, instruments
- Ari Levine – instruments, mixing, engineer
- Dwayne "Supa Dups" Chin-Quee – drums, production, arranger, programmer
- Mitchum "Khan" Chin – keys, guitar, bass
- Brody Brown – instruments
- Needlz – production
- Jeff Bhasker – production
- Damian Marley – rapping
- B.o.B – rapping
- CeeLo Green – vocals
- DJ Dizzy (Jash Negandhi) – scratching

Creative credits

- Nicki Bilardello – art direction, design
- Katie Robinson – marketing director
- Michelle Piza – packaging manager

Recording personnel

- Stephen Marcussen – mastering
- Manny Marroquin – mixing
- Christian Plata – mixing assistant
- Erik Madrid – mixing assistant
- Graham Marsh – engineer

== Charts ==
=== Weekly charts ===
List of chart positions
Chart (2010–2025)	Peak position
Australian Albums (ARIA)	2
Austrian Albums (Ö3 Austria)	2
Belgian Albums (Ultratop Flanders)	1
Belgian Albums (Ultratop Wallonia)	14
Canadian Albums (Billboard)	1
Croatian Albums (HDU)	38
Danish Albums (Hitlisten)	3
Dutch Albums (Album Top 100)	1
Finnish Albums (Suomen virallinen lista)	3
French Albums (SNEP)	13
German Albums (Offizielle Top 100)	1
Greek Albums (IFPI)	31
Hungarian Albums (MAHASZ)	27
Irish Albums (IRMA)	1
Italian Albums (FIMI)	11
Japanese Albums (Oricon)	14
Lithuanian Albums (AGATA)	25
Mexican Albums (Top 100 Mexico)	5
New Zealand Albums (RMNZ)	2
Norwegian Albums (VG-lista)	10
Polish Albums (ZPAV)	7
Portuguese Albums (AFP)	6
Scottish Albums (Official Charts)	1
Slovenian Albums (IFPI)	3
Spanish Albums (Promusicae)	9
Swedish Albums (Sverigetopplistan)	6
Swiss Albums (Schweizer Hitparade)	1
UK Albums (Official Charts)	1
US Billboard 200	3

=== Year-end charts ===
List of chart positions
Chart (2010)	Position
Australian Albums (ARIA)	45
New Zealand Albums (RMNZ)	26

List of chart positions
Chart (2011)	Position
Australian Albums (ARIA)	3
Austrian Albums (Ö3 Austria)	10
Belgian Albums (Ultratop Flanders)	5
Belgian Albums (Ultratop Wallonia)	38
Canadian Albums (Billboard)	6
Danish Albums (Hitlisten)	8
Dutch Albums (MegaCharts)	5
French Albums (SNEP)	34
German Albums (Offizielle Top 100)	4
New Zealand Albums (RMNZ)	2
Spanish Albums (PROMUSICAE)	44
Swiss Albums (Schweizer Hitparade)	4
Swedish Albums (Sverigetopplistan)	45
UK Albums (OCC)	3
US Billboard 200	12

List of chart positions
Chart (2012)	Position
Australian Albums (ARIA)	25
Belgian Albums (Ultratop Flanders)	80
French Albums (SNEP)	105
German Albums (Offizielle Top 100)	97
New Zealand Albums (RMNZ)	15
Swiss Albums (Schweizer Hitparade)	50
UK Albums (OCC)	26
US Billboard 200	60
US Billboard Catalog Albums	35

List of chart positions
Chart (2013)	Position
Australian Albums (ARIA)	55
Japanese Albums (Oricon)	73
New Zealand Albums (RMNZ)	45
US Billboard 200	73
US Billboard Catalog Albums	2

List of chart positions
Chart (2014)	Position
Swedish Albums (Sverigetopplistan)	92
US Billboard 200	87

List of chart positions
Chart (2015)	Position
Swedish Albums (Sverigetopplistan)	77
US Billboard 200	94

List of chart positions
Chart (2016)	Position
Danish Albums (Hitlisten)	77
Swedish Albums (Sverigetopplistan)	78
US Billboard 200	147

List of chart positions
Chart (2017)	Position
Danish Albums (Hitlisten)	76
Swedish Albums (Sverigetopplistan)	84
US Billboard 200	88

List of chart positions
Chart (2018)	Position
Danish Albums (Hitlisten)	81
Icelandic Albums (Tónlistinn)	97
Japanese Albums (Billboard Japan)	97
Swedish Albums (Sverigetopplistan)	80
US Billboard 200	120

List of chart positions
Chart (2019)	Position
Belgian Albums (Ultratop Flanders)	101
Danish Albums (Hitlisten)	87
Swedish Albums (Sverigetopplistan)	100
US Billboard 200	167

List of chart positions
Chart (2020)	Position
Belgian Albums (Ultratop Flanders)	66
Danish Albums (Hitlisten)	70
Dutch Albums (Album Top 100)	51
Icelandic Albums (Tónlistinn)	83
Swedish Albums (Sverigetopplistan)	91
US Billboard 200	142

List of chart positions
Chart (2021)	Position
Australian Albums (ARIA)	48
Belgian Albums (Ultratop Flanders)	32
Belgian Albums (Ultratop Wallonia)	135
Danish Albums (Hitlisten)	30
Dutch Albums (Album Top 100)	33
Icelandic Albums (Tónlistinn)	34
New Zealand Albums (RMNZ)	31
Norwegian Albums (VG-lista)	29
Swedish Albums (Sverigetopplistan)	47
UK Albums (OCC)	60
US Billboard 200	94

List of chart positions
Chart (2022)	Position
Australian Albums (ARIA)	43
Belgian Albums (Ultratop Flanders)	34
Belgian Albums (Ultratop Wallonia)	114
Danish Albums (Hitlisten)	32
Dutch Albums (Album Top 100)	24
Icelandic Albums (Tónlistinn)	26
Japanese Download Albums (Billboard Japan)	85
Swedish Albums (Sverigetopplistan)	65
Swiss Albums (Schweizer Hitparade)	65
UK Albums (OCC)	54
US Billboard 200	86

List of chart positions
Chart (2023)	Position
Australian Albums (ARIA)	52
Belgian Albums (Ultratop Flanders)	39
Belgian Albums (Ultratop Wallonia)	95
Danish Albums (Hitlisten)	42
Dutch Albums (Album Top 100)	29
Icelandic Albums (Tónlistinn)	48
New Zealand Albums (RMNZ)	35
Swedish Albums (Sverigetopplistan)	60
Swiss Albums (Schweizer Hitparade)	33
UK Albums (OCC)	58
US Billboard 200	89

List of chart positions
Chart (2024)	Position
Australian Albums (ARIA)	59
Australian Hip Hop/R&B Albums (ARIA)	15
Belgian Albums (Ultratop Flanders)	29
Belgian Albums (Ultratop Wallonia)	78
Danish Albums (Hitlisten)	49
Dutch Albums (Album Top 100)	27
Icelandic Albums (Tónlistinn)	64
Swedish Albums (Sverigetopplistan)	74
Swiss Albums (Schweizer Hitparade)	24
UK Albums (OCC)	73
US Billboard 200	109

List of chart positions
Chart (2025)	Position
Australian Albums (ARIA)	76
Austrian Albums (Ö3 Austria)	47
Dutch Albums (Album Top 100)	25
Hungarian Albums (MAHASZ)	97
Icelandic Albums (Tónlistinn)	79
Swedish Albums (Sverigetopplistan)	58
Swiss Albums (Schweizer Hitparade)	20
UK Albums (OCC)	74

=== Decade-end charts ===
List of chart positions
Chart (2010–2019)	Position
Australian Albums (ARIA)	10
UK Albums (OCC)	14
US Billboard 200	54

== Certifications ==
List of Certifications and sales
Region	Certification	Certified units/sales
Australia (ARIA)	8× Platinum	560,000^{‡}
Austria (IFPI Austria)	2× Platinum	40,000^{*}
Belgium (BRMA)	Platinum	30,000^{*}
Brazil (Pro-Música Brasil)	Platinum	40,000^{*}
Canada (Music Canada)	Diamond	800,000^{‡}
Denmark (IFPI Danmark)	8× Platinum	160,000^{‡}
France (SNEP)	2× Platinum	200,000^{*}
Germany (BVMI)	7× Gold	700,000^{‡}
Ireland (IRMA)	4× Platinum	60,000^{^}
Italy (FIMI)	2× Platinum	100,000^{‡}
Japan (RIAJ)	Platinum	250,000^{^}
Japan (RIAJ) Digital	Gold	100,000^{*}
Mexico (AMPROFON)	Gold	30,000^{^}
Netherlands (NVPI)	Gold	25,000^{^}
New Zealand (RMNZ)	13× Platinum	195,000^{‡}
Philippines (PARI)	2× Diamond	300,000^{*}
Poland (ZPAV)	Gold	10,000^{*}
Portugal (AFP)	Gold	10,000^{^}
Singapore (RIAS)	4× Platinum	40,000^{*}
Spain (Promusicae)	Platinum	60,000^{‡}
Sweden (GLF)	Gold	20,000^{‡}
Switzerland (IFPI Switzerland)	2× Platinum	60,000^{^}
United Kingdom (BPI)	8× Platinum	2,400,000^{‡}
United States (RIAA)	9× Platinum	9,000,000^{‡}
Summaries
Europe (IFPI)	3× Platinum	3,000,000^{*}
^{*} Sales figures based on certification alone.^{^} Shipments figures based on certification alone.^{‡} Sales+streaming figures based on certification alone.

== Release history ==
Release dates and formats
Region	Date	Label(s)	Format(s)	Edition(s)	Ref
Italy	October 4, 2010	Elektra	Digital download	iTunes Store deluxe version	
Mexico	October 4, 2010	Elektra	Digital download	Standard	
United States	October 4, 2010	Atlantic; Elektra	Digital download	Standard; deluxe	
Canada	October 5, 2010	Warner Music	CD	Standard	
France	October 5, 2010	Elektra	Digital download	European bonus tracks	
Germany	October 5, 2010	Elektra	Digital download	European bonus tracks	
United States	October 5, 2010	Elektra; Atlantic; Warner	Digital download; CD	Standard; European bonus tracks	
Denmark	October 5, 2010	Elektra	Digital download	European bonus tracks	
New Zealand	October 11, 2010	Warner Music New Zealand	CD	Standard	
Australia	October 15, 2010	Warner Music Australia	CD	Standard	
United States	December 7, 2010	Elektra	LP	Standard	
Japan	January 12, 2011	Warner Music Japan	CD	Deluxe/Tour edition	
Germany	January 14, 2011	Atlantic	CD; LP	European bonus tracks	
United Kingdom	January 17, 2011	Atlantic	Digital download; CD; LP	European bonus tracks	(Note: The version of the physical album originally available for pre-order in the UK was the standard edition. However, for unknown reasons, its release date was advanced and the edition changed to the European Bonus Tracks along with the inclusion of the digital download.)
Poland	January 24, 2011	Warner Music Poland	CD	European bonus tracks	
Taiwan	March 2, 2011	Warner	CD	European bonus tracks	
Taiwan	March 2, 2011	Warner	CD	Deluxe/Tour edition	
United Kingdom	November 8, 2011	Atlantic	Digital download; CD	Deluxe/Tour edition	
Japan	May 23, 2012	Warner Music Japan	CD	Japanese platinum edition	

== See also ==
- List of best-selling albums in New Zealand
- List of best-selling albums in the Philippines
