= Count On Me (Bruno Mars song) =

2011 single by Bruno Mars

Single by Bruno Mars

from the album Doo-Wops & Hooligans
- Released: November 7, 2011
- Genre: Folk; tropical
- Length: 3:14
- Label: Atlantic; Warner Music Australia
- Songwriters: Bruno Mars; Philip Lawrence; Ari Levine
- Producer: The Smeezingtons

Bruno Mars singles chronology
"Young, Wild & Free" (2011)	"Count On Me" (2011)	"Locked Out of Heaven" (2012)

Lyric video
- "Count On Me" on YouTube

"Count On Me" is a song by American singer-songwriter Bruno Mars from his debut studio album, Doo-Wops & Hooligans (2010). The song was first unveiled on Mars's debut extended play, It's Better If You Don't Understand (2010). It was serviced to Australian contemporary hit radio and adult contemporary radio on November 7, 2011, as the overall sixth and final single from the album. It was composed by Mars, Philip Lawrence, and Ari Levine, under their alias, the Smeezingtons. Musically, "Count On Me" is a folk and tropical record that lyrically details the importance of friendship and conveys a positive message.

The song received generally positive to mixed reviews. Some music critics praised its arrangement and "uplifting" vibe, others criticized its "saccharine sound" and lyrics. The single peaked at number two in the Czech Republic and it was able to reach the position of 19 in Australia and 13 in New Zealand. It was certified three times platinum by the Australian Recording Industry Association (ARIA) and Recorded Music NZ (RMNZ) and five times platinum by the Recording Industry Association of America (RIAA) and six times by Music Canada (MC). Mars performed "Count on Me" on television shows such as The Ellen DeGeneres Show and included it on The Doo-Wops & Hooligans Tour (2010–12), the Hooligans in Wondaland Tour (2011), and once on the Moonshine Jungle Tour (2013–14). It has been covered a number of times and used in commercials.

== Production and release ==
"Count On Me" was first recorded by Bruno Mars for his debut EP, It's Better If You Don't Understand, released on May 11, 2010, under Elektra Records. It was written by Mars, Philip Lawrence and Ari Levine, while production was handled by the same three under their alias, the Smeezingtons. Levine was responsible for engineering the song, which he did at Levcon Studios in Los Angeles. Levine and Mars played all of the instruments on the track. The single was mixed by Manny Marroquin and assistants Christian Plata and Erik Madrid at Larrabee Recording Studios in Los Angeles, California. It was mastered by Stephen Marcussen at Marcussen Mastering in Hollywood, California. "Count on Me" was issued to contemporary hit radio and adult contemporary radio on November 7, 2011, in Australia by Atlantic Records and Warner Music Australia.

== Composition ==
"Count On Me"
An 18-second sample where Mars's details the importance of friendship and conveys a positive message.

"Count On Me" has been labelled as a folk and tropical song. The Scotsman found it to be influenced by reggae. It features a laid back groove and tropical vibes, resembling Mars's "Hawaiian background." An acoustic guitar and "beach-bound bongos" are part of its instrumentation. According to the sheet music, the song is composed in the key of C major with a time signature in common time, and a moderate groove of 88 beats per minute.

AllMusic's Tim Sendra called the song a "bittersweet ballad", while Katie Hasty from HitFix classified it as a "sandy-sweet tune". It draws inspiration from the works of Jason Mraz, Jack Johnson and David Cook. MTV UK Joanne Dorken and Eric Henderson of Slant Magazine said the recording's sound was "reminiscent" of "Over The Rainbow" (1993) by Israel Kamakawiwoʻole. It conveys the message of comfort found in a friend and being present for those who are important in your life. Jon Dolan from Rolling Stone labeled it as a "simple ode to love and friendship."

== Critical reception ==
"Count On Me" received generally positive reviews from most music critics. Rivas gave the song a 7 out of 10 saying that it is an "uplifting and chilled sounds" and that it "hits all the right spots". Rivas found the lyrics to convey a "nice" and "positive" message, adding that the single "shows some similarities with his other singles but not to much detriment". The Boston Globe critic Ken Capobianco exalted Mars's vocals on the recording as "one of his best" on the album. While reviewing Mars's debut EP, It's Better If You Don't Understand, Bill Lamb of About.com stated that "there is a dreamy wistfulness here that is irresistible, regarding "Count On Me". He added, that the song is "perfect for summer days". Dolan described it the track's "island-tinged acoustic melody" as irresistible. However, while reviewing the parent album, Sendra found that the song lacked deepness and that "it's not poetry". Nevertheless, Sendra did say that the track is "sweetly played and sung" and is able to "project a cuddly image and will melt hearts".

On the other hand, Now's Kevin Ritchie criticized the song for its "cutesy lyrics" and "insipid rhymes like "You can count on me like one, two, three". He added that the song doesn't contribute for the album cohesion, but add for a "no-brainer radio references to Coldplay, U2, Michael Jackson, Sade, Feist and so on". Alexis Petridis of The Guardian concurred with the latter on the "saccharine sound" and explained that during the recording "you start to boggle that Britain's teens are being fed something so sugary without Jamie Oliver getting a campaign up about it".

== Commercial performance ==
In New Zealand, "Count on Me" spent two weeks at its peak position of 13, after debuting at number 21 on August 29, 2011. It was awarded a triple platinum plaque by Recorded Music NZ (RMNZ). The single first appeared on the UK Singles Chart on September 24, 2011, peaking at number 78 on the following week. It was able to spend four weeks on the chart and was certified platinum by the British Phonographic Industry (BPI). In 2012, the song debuted at the Ö3 Austria Top 40 at number 15, peaking at number five on the following week. It was able to spend 14 weeks on the chart and it was certified gold by IFPI Austria. "Count On Me" debuted on Switzerland, spending six weeks on the chart and peaking at number 55. Despite never charted in Canada, the song was certified six times platinum by Music Canada (MC).

"Count on Me" debuted in Australia on December 11, 2012, at number 41, peaking at number 19 four weeks after its debut. It was the eleventh most played song in the Australian radio in 2012 and was certified three times platinum by the Australian Recording Industry Association (ARIA). In 2013, it peaked at number seven on the Spanish Singles Chart and left the charts after two weeks. Despite never charting at German Top 100, the track reached the top position of the German airplay chart and was certified gold by the Bundesverband Musikindustrie (BVMI). It was certified five times platinum by the Recording Industry Association of America (RIAA), despite never being promoted as a single in the US. In 2020, the song entered the Scottish Singles Chart, peaking at number 21.

== Live performances ==
In September 2010, Mars performed "Count on Me" in front of a small crowd of fans at the Waterloo Records in Austin, Texas. He sung it live on September 27, 2010, during a MTV Push Live session held in the United Kingdom. Mars, who was the opening act in an episode of The Ellen DeGeneres Show in December 2012, performed the track as a tribute to the victims of the shooting in Newtown, Connecticut. It was included on his debut world tour, The Doo-Wops & Hooligans Tour (2010) and on the Hooligans in Wondaland Tour (2011). It was performed only once during the Moonshine Jungle Tour (2013–2014) in Jakarta.

== Cover versions and usage in media ==
"Count on Me" has been covered by British child singer Connie Talbot and included on her album Beautiful World (2012). South Korean artists Lee Ki-chan and G.NA released a cover of the song as a CD single on May 12, 2011. The CD single, also includes an acoustic version, instrumental version and acoustic instrumental version of the track. It was sung live by 5,000 children from the Voice in a Million Choir at the Wembley Arena. In 2015, Olivia Holt performed a cover of the song on the series finale of I Didn't Do It. In 2019 it was covered by Gabriel Mann on Season 2 Episode 4 of the television show A Million Little Things (ABC Signature). It was also covered by the Willis Family for the first episode of the second season of their show by the same name, aired by TLC. In 2020, American singer-songwriter Josie Dunne and Australian singer-songwriter Wafia covered "Count On Me", in different instances, as part of the tenth anniversary of Mars's debut album.

The recording is part of the Belgian/American animated film A Turtle's Tale: Sammy's Adventures and the TV show Suburgatory. It has been featured on two different commercials for the Blue Cross Blue Shield Association, both took place one in Illinois. and was used for a Hyundai 's commercial, during the Super Bowl XLVIII’s fourth quarter, entitled "Dad's Sixth Sense", that featured the 2016 Hyundai Genesis and Mars's song. It was chosen "for reasons separate and coincidental from Mars' previously announced Half Time gig". The track was included on the Songs for the Philippines relief album, which was compiled to help the victims of Typhoon Haiyan since "all proceeds" were donated to the Philippine Red Cross. It is featured in the film, Diary of a Wimpy Kid: The Long Haul (2017) and on a commercial for Ferrero SpA. The song is also featured in the official trailer for the 2021 film, Tom & Jerry.

== Personnel ==
Credits adapted from the liner notes of Doo-Wops & Hooligans, Elektra Records:

- Bruno Mars – lead vocals, songwriting, instrumentation
- Philip Lawrence – songwriting
- Ari Levine – songwriting, instrumentation, engineering
- The Smeezingtons – production
- Manny Marroquin – mixing
- Erik Madrid – mixing assistant
- Christian Plata – mixing assistant
- Stephen Marcussen – mastering

== Charts ==
=== Weekly charts ===
List of chart positions
Chart (2011–2013)	Peak position
Australia (ARIA)	19
Austria (Ö3 Austria Top 40)	5
Czech Republic Airplay (ČNS IFPI)	2
Germany Airplay (Official German Charts)	1
Hungary (Editors' Choice Top 40)	27
New Zealand (Recorded Music NZ)	13
Portugal Digital Songs Sales (Billboard)	6
Slovakia Airplay (ČNS IFPI)	41
Slovenia (SloTop50)	2
Spain (Promusicae)	7
Switzerland (Schweizer Hitparade)	55
UK Singles (Official Charts)	78
UK Hip Hop/R&B (Official Charts)	23

List of chart positions
Chart (2020)	Peak position
Scottish Singles Sales (Official Charts)	21
US Digital Song Sales (Billboard)	36

=== Year-end charts ===
List of chart positions
Chart (2011)	Position
New Zealand (Recorded Music NZ)	42
Chart (2012)	Position
Australia (ARIA)	86
Chart (2013)	Position
Slovenia (SloTop50)	49

== Certifications ==
List of certifications
Region	Certification	Certified units/sales
Australia (ARIA)	3× Platinum	210,000^{^}
Austria (IFPI Austria)	Gold	15,000^{*}
Canada (Music Canada)	6× Platinum	480,000^{‡}
Denmark (IFPI Danmark)	Platinum	90,000^{‡}
Germany (BVMI)	Gold	150,000^{‡}
New Zealand (RMNZ)	3× Platinum	90,000^{‡}
Spain (Promusicae)	Platinum	60,000^{‡}
Switzerland (IFPI Switzerland)	Gold	15,000^{‡}
United Kingdom (BPI)	Platinum	600,000^{‡}
United States (RIAA)	5× Platinum	5,000,000^{‡}
^{*} Sales figures based on certification alone.^{^} Shipments figures based on certification alone.^{‡} Sales+streaming figures based on certification alone.

== Release history ==
List of release history showing region, date, format(s) and label(s)
Country	Date	Format	Label	Ref.
Australia	November 7, 2011	Contemporary hit radio	Atlantic; Warner Music Australia	
Australia	November 7, 2011	Adult contemporary radio	Atlantic; Warner Music Australia	
