= Talking to the Moon =

2011 single by Bruno Mars

Single by Bruno Mars

from the album Doo-Wops & Hooligans
- Released: April 12, 2011
- Genre: Pop; R&B
- Length: 3:37
- Label: Warner Music Brasil
- Songwriters: Bruno Mars; Philip Lawrence; Ari Levine; Albert Winkler; Jeff Bhasker
- Producer: The Smeezingtons

Bruno Mars singles chronology
"The Lazy Song" (2011)	"Talking to the Moon" (2011)	"Lighters" (2011)

Lyric video
- "Talking to the Moon" on YouTube

"Talking to the Moon" is a song by American singer-songwriter Bruno Mars from his debut studio album, Doo-Wops & Hooligans (2010). The song was first unveiled on Mars' debut extended play, It's Better If You Don't Understand (2010), as its last track. It was written by Mars, Philip Lawrence, Ari Levine, Albert Winkler, and Jeff Bhasker, while production was handled by the Smeezingtons in collaboration with Bhasker. "Talking to the Moon" is a pop and R&B power ballad about a failed relationship, solitude, and sadness. Instrumentally, the track relies on drum percussion and piano.

"Talking to the Moon" received mixed reviews from music critics. Some praised its slow pace and lyrics, while others criticized its overwhelming production. The song was announced as a single only in Brazil, on April 12, 2011, through Warner Music Brasil, following its appearance on the soundtrack of the Brazilian telenovela Insensato Coração (2011). The song charted on the Brasil Hot 100 Airplay, where it spent several weeks at number one, and on the Billboard Brasil Hot Pop & Popular. It was certified six times platinum by the Recording Industry Association of America (RIAA), seven times platinum by Music Canada (MC) and diamond by the Syndicat national de l'édition phonographique (SNEP). It has been included it on all his tours since 2010.

== Background and production ==
"Talking to the Moon" was first recorded by Bruno Mars for his debut EP, It's Better If You Don't Understand, which was released on May 11, 2010 under Elektra Records. When asked about the lyrical content of the record, Mars stated that "[he] just [writes] songs that [he] strongly believe in and that are coming from inside. There's no tricks. It's honesty with big melodies. And [he is] singing the s*** out of them." During an interview, Mars explained that after writing and producing songs for other artists, he thought that he could write a song for himself. He started writing the lyrics of "Talking to the Moon" while playing the piano. The track was included five months later on his debut studio album, Doo-Wops & Hooligans, released on October 4, 2010 under the Elektra and Atlantic labels. Mars also recorded an acoustic piano version included on the deluxe edition of the album. Ari Levine described how the song was conceived in an interview for Sound on Sound:

We only had the first verse and the horns. We then had three different bridges and we spent a lot of time trying to find out which one was the best. Jeff Bhasker is a fantastic musician, and he helped write that track. I think we tried to arrange and produce this in four different ways, mostly trying to figure out what kind of drums to put on.

"Talking to the Moon" was written by Mars, Philip Lawrence, Levine, Bhasker, and Albert Winkler, and produced by the former three, under their alias, the Smeezingtons, while Bhasker co-produced the song. Levine and Mars played all the instruments on the track; Levine was also responsible for engineering the song at Levcon Studios in California. The mixing of the track was done at Larrabee Sound Studios in Los Angeles by Manny Marroquin, with Christian Plata and Erik Madrid serving as assistants. It was mastered by Stephen Marcussen at Marcussen Mastering in Hollywood, California.

== Composition ==
"Talking to the Moon"
A 21-second sample of the song in which Mars sings "In hopes you're on the other side talking to me too/ Or am I a fool who sits alone talking to the moon?/Ohoooo...".

"Talking to the Moon" is a "soaring" pop and R&B power ballad. Its instrumentation consists primarily of drums and a piano. According to the digital sheet music on Music-Notes, the song is written in the key of C♯ minor and is set in a 4/4 time signature with a ballad tempo of 73 beats per minute. Mars's vocal range spans from B_{3} to C♯_{5}, and the song follows the chord progression E–G♯_{7}–C♯m–B–A. Natalie Li from The Harvard Crimson felt the song has an "electro twist". Sasha Frere-Jones wrote for The New Yorker the single relies on a "gorgeous wall of backing harmony".

The song's lyrics describe feelings of loneliness, loss, and hope in the chorus: "Talking to the moon/Tryin to get to you/In hopes you're on the other side/Talking to me, too". As the song continues, it shows the singer's vulnerable side with soft, sincere lyrics about a lost love that has now gone. Pittsburgh Post-Gazette's Scott Mervis described Mars's vocals on the track as "yearning". Sherri Thornhill of Yahoo!, believed the lyrics reveal the singer's hope that "his former flame is talking to the moon just as he is". A similar opinion was shared by Seattle Post-Intelligencer's Tyrone Reid, noticing Mars "waxing poetic about love and longing".

== Critical reception ==
The song received mixed reviews from music critics. Alex Young of Consequence of Sound gave the song a positive review writing that the song "may be the best of this collection [album]", adding that "this track is primed for radio; a soft, sincere piano-driven song about a lost love that has now gone [...] belts the vulnerable Mars." Yahoo!'s music critic, Sherri Thornhill, praised the song, calling it a "beauty" and "relatable", since the lyrics show the "heartbroken lover['s]" wish that his former lover is doing the same as he is – talking to the moon. The Seattle Post-Intelligencer's reviewer, Tyrone S. Reid, considered the song "beautifully written, waxing poetic about love and longing – a forte that the singer employs with great results in his work." Leah Greenblatt of Entertainment Weekly called "Talking to the Moon" "woebegone", adding that "a malt-shop heart beats beneath [its] digital skin". Emily Yang of The Signal stated that Mars "focuses on the slow pace of the drums and piano to convey his sorrow. He sings of loneliness which is almost palpable in the chorus."

On the other hand, Bill Lamb of About.com wrote that it "is possibly the weakest track simply because the heavy production threatens to overwhelm the centerpiece of Bruno Mars' singing because it is a big power jazz ballad." In the same vein, Mike Diver of BBC Music considered the song "a ballad devoid of detectable emotion". The same perspective was replicated by Jamie Milton from musicOMH, who called it a "over-sentimental ballad". The Scotsman compared "Talking to the Moon" to the "Gary Barlow stirring-yet-banal mould", dubbing it "a slowed-down, doleful version of "Billionaire" (2011).

== Commercial performance ==
Following the track's inclusion on the soundtrack of Insensato Coração, which generated most of the song's success, Warner Music Brasil decided to release it as an official single in Brazil on April 12, 2011. After its release, "Talking to the Moon" charted on two Brazilian charts – Billboard Brasil Hot Pop & Popular and the Brasil Hot 100 Airplay with it reaching the top position in both cases. The song spent nine weeks at number one on the latter chart, while it topped the former chart for 22 weeks. It became the fourth song with the most weeks spent at the top of Billboard Brasil Hot Pop & Popular and on Brasil Hot 100 Airplay it ranked seventh with the most weeks at number one as of 2012. In April 2021, the song received a resurgence on the video-sharing app TikTok, which it led to enter various charts. "Talking to the Moon" was certified six times platinum by the Recording Industry Association of America (RIAA), seven times platinum by Music Canada (MC) and diamond by the Syndicat national de l'édition phonographique (SNEP).

== Other usage and live performances ==
The song was used on the soundtrack of Brazilian telenovela Insensato Coração. It was also used in the movie, A Turtle's Tale: Sammy's Adventures, with it being as well included on the movie soundtrack as a bonus song. An acoustic piano version of "Talking to the Moon" was included on the charity compilation album, Songs for Japan, released on March 25, 2011. "Talking to the Moon" was featured in the movie Think Like a Man, released in 2012, where the song was attributed to Mars in the final credits. In 2020, American R&B band Michelle and American singer Catie Turner covered "Talking to the Moon", in different instances, as part of the tenth anniversary of Mars's debut album. In 2021, Gambian-born rapper Jnr Choi's single "To the Moon" sampled a cover of the song by British singer-songwriter Sam Tompkins.

It was the fourteenth song on the set list of Mars's debut world tour, The Doo-Wops & Hooligans Tour (2010–2012) and was also, sometimes, sung as an encore on the Hooligans in Wondaland Tour (2011). It was also performed during a show on the South American leg of the 24K Magic World Tour (2017–2018). In 2022, Mars sung "Talking to the Moon" as part of a medley during his Bruno Mars Live (2022-2024) setlist.

== Personnel ==
Credits adapted from the liner notes of Doo-Wops & Hooligans.

- Bruno Mars – lead vocals, songwriting, instrumentation
- Philip Lawrence – songwriting
- Ari Levine – songwriting, instrumentation, engineering
- Albert Winkler – songwriting
- Jeff Bhasker – songwriting, co-production
- The Smeezingtons – production
- Manny Marroquin – mixing
- Christian Plata – mixing assistant
- Erik Madrid – mixing assistant
- Stephen Marcussen – mastering

== Charts ==
=== Weekly charts ===
List of chart positions
Chart (2011)	Peak position
Brazil Hot 100 Airplay (Billboard)	1
Brazil Hot Pop Songs (Billboard)	1

List of chart positions
Chart (2017)	Peak position
Japan Hot 100 (Billboard)	45

List of chart positions
Chart (2021)	Peak position
Australia (ARIA)	81
Global 200 (Billboard)	57
Portugal (AFP)	50
Singapore (RIAS)	23
Sweden Heatseeker (Sverigetopplistan)	4
Switzerland (Schweizer Hitparade)	92

List of chart positions
Chart (2023–2024)	Peak position
Malaysia (Billboard)	12
Malaysia International (RIM)	12
Philippines Hot 100 (Billboard)	85
Singapore (RIAS)	10

List of chart positions
Chart (2026)	Peak position
Netherlands (Single Top 100)	71

=== Year-end charts ===
List of chart positions
Chart (2011)	Position
Brazil (Crowley Broadcast Analysis)	3

List of chart positions
Chart (2021)	Position
Global 200 (Billboard)	156
Portugal (AFP)	116

== Certifications ==
List of certifications
Region	Certification	Certified units/sales
Canada (Music Canada)	7× Platinum	560,000^{‡}
Denmark (IFPI Danmark)	Platinum	90,000^{‡}
France (SNEP)	Diamond	333,333^{‡}
Germany (BVMI)	Gold	300,000^{‡}
Italy (FIMI)	Platinum	100,000^{‡}
New Zealand (RMNZ)	4× Platinum	120,000^{‡}
Portugal (AFP)	Platinum	20,000^{‡}
Spain (Promusicae)	Platinum	60,000^{‡}
United States (RIAA)	6× Platinum	6,000,000^{‡}
Streaming
Japan (RIAJ)	Gold	50,000,000^{†}
^{‡} Sales+streaming figures based on certification alone.^{†} Streaming-only figures based on certification alone.

== See also ==
- List of Hot 100 number-one singles of 2011 (Brazil)
- List of number-one pop hits of 2011 (Brazil)
