= Jubilee CityFest =

Arts and music festival in Alabama, USA

Jubilee City Fest was a three-day, family-friendly, arts and music festival that took place in downtown Montgomery, Alabama, USA. It was the city's largest music and children's festival on the streets of Montgomery featuring three stages with national, regional and local entertainment, fireworks, ArtsFest, 8 km / 2 mile run, and a free concert by the Montgomery Symphony Orchestra. The event was discontinued in 2012.

== Organization ==
Jubilee CityFest was a 501(c)(3) non-profit organization that had three seasonal workers with 300 volunteers.
