= Hooligans in Wondaland Tour =

2011 concert tour by Bruno Mars and Janelle Monáe

- Tour by Bruno Mars and Janelle Monáe
- Promotional poster for the tour
- Location: North America
- Associated albums: Doo-Wops & Hooligans; The ArchAndroid
- Start date: May 1, 2011
- End date: June 16, 2011
- Legs: 1
- No. of shows: 29
- Supporting acts: Plan B; Patrick Stump; Mayer Hawthorne & the County
Bruno Mars Tour chronology
The Doo-Wops & Hooligans Tour (2010–12)	Hooligans in Wondaland Tour (2011)	The Moonshine Jungle Tour (2013–14)
Janelle Monáe Tour chronology
The ArchAndroid Tour (2010)	Hooligans in Wondaland Tour (2011)	Campus Consciousness Tour (2011)

The Hooligans in Wondaland Tour was a concert tour that was headlined by American singer-songwriter Bruno Mars and Janelle Monáe to support Mars's and Monáe's 2010 debut studio albums, Doo-Wops & Hooligans and The ArchAndroid, respectively. The co-headlining concerts were announced in February 2011; it coincided with their performances at the 53rd Annual Grammy Awards. In April 2011, a promotional trailer was released through Mars's YouTube channel and a dedicated website, which was designed to further promote the tour. The concerts took place in North America in May and June of that year.

Mars declined several invitations to open shows for other artists because performing in small, intimate venues, would allow him to build a fan base. Mars's set list for the tour included songs from Doo-Wops & Hooligans, and some covers while Monáe's set list included songs from The ArchAndroid, one song from her debut EP Metropolis: The Chase Suite (2007), and two covers. The Hooligans in Wondaland Tour received positive reviews from most critics, who praised Mars's and Monáe's performances, and said they, along with Mayer Hawthorne, are providers "of perfect pop music". The co-headlined tour was named by NME as one of the best 25.

== Background and development ==
On February 15, 2011, after Bruno Mars and Janelle Monáe performed at the 53rd Annual Grammy Awards, a joint co-headlining tour for both artists entitled "Hooligans in Wondaland" was announced. The concert tour was performed in North America in throughout May and June 2011. Pre-sales tickets were made available two days after the announcement of the tour; they were sold as bundles that included a meet-and-greet with one of the artists, a signed poster, a digital EP, and a commemorative laminate. On February 26, 2011, tickets were made available to the general public. A promotional trailer was released through Mars's YouTube channel, as well as a dedicated website to promote the tour.

The tour was named Hooligans in Wondaland Tour, after both Mars's debut studio album Doo-Wops & Hooligans (2010), Monáe's Atlanta crew Wondaland Arts Society, and a track included on her debut studio album The ArchAndroid (2010). The tour's promotional poster was inspired by the artwork of "James Brown-era all-star shows at the Apollo Theater". In 2011, Mars rejected several requests to open shows for other artists and instead decided to co-headline a tour with Monáe. The show was produced by AEG. This strategy meant lower earnings in the short term but allowed Mars to build a fan base by performing shows at small, intimate venues. After the first show of the Hooligans in Wondaland Tour, Mars said he was nervous about the "production values" of the lights and other equipment.

=== Sound ===
During the Hooligans in Wondaland concerts, Mars's and Monáe's engineers shared the consoles, and technician Ben Rothstein handled the sound gear. In addition, Derek Brener, Mars's front of house (FOH) engineer, controlled several inputs and outputs, including the Stereo Auxiliary Output for the subwoofers. Brener also controlled the distressors on Mars's vocals and bass. Hall Verb was employed for drums and horns, delay and R-Verb for vocals, and compression of the guitar's sound. Mars had two pairs of speaker wedges downstage center; the inner pair was mixed with his voice and two background vocals while the outer pair had the band mix along with his guitar on top, according to Mars's monitor engineer Mike Graham. Alex McCloud, Monáe's monitor engineer, said her setup was very close to that used by Mars but Monáe had a wedge mix and sidefill speakers in front. Reggie Griffith, Monáe's FOH assistant, was in charge of the singer's vocals, removing some of the pitch when she leaned into the microphone. Griffith and Nate "Rocket" Wonder were responsible for mixing Monáe's tracks.

== Concert synopsis ==
The concerts were supported by Mayer Hawthorne & The County, American musician Patrick Stump and English rapper Plan B. Hawthorne used his opening spot to play a range of material, including some of his famous covers. Monáe performed the concerts in a "The Cotton Club" set, along with her 13-piece orchestra, the ArchOrchestra. She was dressed in a white shirt, black tie, tuxedo pants/trousers and a cloak covering it, while her hair was arranged in a pompadour. The ArchOrchestra included three violinists, a cellist, and two horn players; the musicians wore white and black 1960's modernist-style clothing. Mars, who used a Gibson guitar during the concerts, performed with his band the Hooligans. (Note: Mars's band references can be seen in the Personnel section under The Hooligans) During the Hooligans in Wondaland Tour, Mars usually wore a fedora hat, a "plaid flannel-turned-vest" or a sleeveless denim jacket over a tee-shirt—sometimes with a Harley-Davidson design—and black jeans. The stage had square screens projecting images, lights, and flashing graphic colors and video. Mars's set lasted around an hour.

=== Monáe ===
The show started with an MC wearing a top hat and coat-tails. Monáe was taken to stage by several dancers wearing hooded black cloaks, which were later removed and the dancers instead wore "skintight bodysuits with glittering cuffs". At the same time, the ArchOrchestra played "space-funk" as a James Bond and Fantasia fusion appeared on the screens. Monáe usually opened with the instrumental of "Suite II Overture". Once on stage, she performed "Dance or Die" and "Faster", alternating between rapping and gospel chanting. Monáe also sang "Locked Inside". She created a "theatrical flair", fending off masked dancers. Afterwards, Monáe put on sunglasses and performed "Sincerely, Jane" as well as a cover of The Jackson 5's "I Want You Back" while moonwalking.

Monáe then turned her back to the audience, and painted on a canvas the word "love" in yellow letters and a female figure as she sang "Mushrooms & Roses". Under dimmed lights, Monáe, accompanied by a guitarist, performed Charlie Chaplin's ballad "Smile", after which she started a "pouding", "toe-tapping" performance of "Cold War" and the "funk jam" "Tightrope". During the performance of "Cold War", images of Mohammed Ali "bobbing and weaving", and Darth Vader with Luke Skywalker battling using lightsabers were displayed. She closed her set with a rock gospel version of "Come Alive (The War of the Roses)", before diving into the crowd, getting a "piggy-back ride" over fans or taking a "victory lap". While Monáe performed "Tightrope", strobe lights flashed and the discordant mixture of sounds was turned "to a whisper". Monáe and her band laid down on the floor and then emerged from it "back to a full-blooded finish". Both songs were sung in a crescendo. As Monáe talked and wailed, her hair released itself from its pompadour, and her performance reached a climax.

=== Mars ===
Before Mars started his show, he asked the crowd to put away their mobile phones. He began by performing the "feel-good" theme "Top of The World", which was inspired by Michael Jackson's song "Wanna Be Startin' Somethin'". The third song on the setlist was a rock cover of "Money (That's What I Want)" by Barrett Strong, which served as an interlude before the reggae influences on Travie McCoy and Mars's featured single, "Billionaire", a song with which the audience joined in at many performances. The performance of "Billionaire", which was shorter than the original song, had Mars singing the verses "I'll freak you right, I will" to the sound of Aaliyah's "Are You That Somebody." He performed "Our First Time" in a sensual way with reggae vibes influenced by jazz. The song was followed by the uptempo "Runaway Baby", which was filled with "retro rock 'n' roll". Before Mars sang a doo-wop harmony with three members of his band, he told the audience, "This is the kind of music I love". He then sang the romantic, the Beach Boys-influenced anthem "Marry You".

"Marry You" was followed by "The Lazy Song", one of the highlights of the tour; Mars's performance included a comedic moment in which his backup singer shouted, "Oh my God, that feels great!" and the band stopped to "goof". The performance also included a repetition of the verse "have some nice sex". "Count on Me", an "ode to buddydom", was performed as a singalong in which Mars played a ukulele. An extended version of "Liquor Store Blues" was included in the set. Mars would serenade a woman in the audience with his chorus on B.o.B's "Nothin' on You", as a portion of "Have You Seen Her" by the Chi-Lites "emerged". He returned to the stage and sang "Grenade" as a powerful rock song that was inspired by the Cure's "Just Like Heaven". The show's closing number "Just the Way You Are" was performed with a different melody; Mars asked the "men in the audience to give their ladies attention", sometimes choosing a woman from the crowd and singing to her. For some concerts, the encore was "Somewhere in Brooklyn", which had the word "Brooklyn" replaced with the name of the city in which he was performing. Mars closed the show with the emotional ballad "Talking to the Moon", which was inspired by the "70s soft-rock" of the Carpenters and Chicago.

== Critical reception ==
The Hooligans in Wondaland concerts were met with mostly positive reviews. Chris Gray, writing for Houston Press, praised Mars's and Monáe's performances, saying the show was "assembled so perfectly, delivered so charismatically and received so warmly". Gray concluded, "finding fault ... would be like throwing rocks at the Easter Bunny". Jordan Levin from the Miami Herald complimented the show, saying Mars and Monáe are "moving musical formulas forward, not with technology and spectacle, but with invention and talent". Robert Ham of The Oregonian said Mars had the spectators' attention throughout the concert and that he sang every note himself; Ham also praised Mars's guitar skills and dubbed Monáe's performance "exhilarating". LA Weekly's Lainna Fader lauded the performances and commented, "With the addition of Mayer Hawthorne, you've got three of the truest purveyors of perfect pop music on stage together.""

Matthew Kivel of Variety praised Mars and Monáe's performance by saying that "Mars is impressive, his vocal gifts allowing him to infuse heavy doses of emotion and subtle improvisations into his song's", while Monáe "brought a refreshingly unpredictable approach to her stage show", showing "the up-and-comer as a talent with seemingly unlimited potential." Angel Cheung and Alexis Greskiw from The Vancouver Observer praised the show, saying, "Monáe and Mars were the perfect combination, filled with vivacity and soul."" Shawn White, for Westword said the Hooligans in Wondaland Tour "might look like a strange bill" but "all three featured acts are purveyors of perfect pop music". Seattle Gay News's Shaun Knittel commended the live show, saying, "Bruno Mars and Janelle Monáe are as good as critics say they are." Reed Fischer, for New Times Broward-Palm Beach, affirmed that Mars's show "exceeded" his "expectations immensely".

In a mixed review, Billboard's Leila Cobo affirmed that Mars "comes across like the real thing, like few acts today do." Cobo dubbed Monáe's show as "impressive", but that she was missing "some of Mars' nuance". Emily Barker of The Globe and Mail called Mars's set "obvious and pedestrian; so cynical and exploitative" but praised Monáe's performance, saying, "she proved herself miraculous, an unabashedly theatrical musical polyglot". The Hollywood Reporter's Lauren Schutte criticized the high cost of the ticket due to the "short running time" but noted everyone "looked more than satisfied".

NME's Emily Barker compiled a list of the 25 best co-headlined shows as of 2013, on which she ranked the Hooligans in Wondaland Tour at number 20. Barker said the show "took its cues from the old-school".

== Set lists ==
Mars and Monáe's set lists given below were performed on May 18, 2011, respectively. The list evolved over the course of the tour, and sometimes included other numbers. Mars included "Please Say You Want Me" by The Schoolboys, the Cleftones' "You Belong to Me" and a portion of "Somewhere in Brooklyn" along with "Talking to the Moon" as an encore, with the word "Brooklyn" replaced with the name of the city in which he was performing. Monáe included "America the Beautiful", "Say You'll Go" and "Wondaland".

1. "The Other Side"
2. "Top of The World"
3. "Money (That's What I Want)" / "Billionaire"
4. "Our First Time"
5. "Runaway Baby"
6. Doo Wop (interlude)
7. "Marry You"
8. "The Lazy Song"
9. "Count on Me"
10. "Liquor Store Blues"
11. "Nothin' on You"
12. "Grenade"

Encore

13. "Just the Way You Are"

1. "Dance or Die"
2. "Faster"
3. "Locked Inside"
4. "Smile" (Charlie Chaplin cover)
5. "Sincerely, Jane"
6. "I Want You Back" (The Jackson 5 cover)
7. "Mushrooms & Roses"
8. "Cold War"
9. "Tightrope"
10. "Come Alive (The War of the Roses)"

== Shows ==
List of concerts, showing date, city, country, venue and opening actNorth America concerts (Hooligans in Wondaland)
Date (2011)	City	Country	Venue	Opening act
May 1 (Note: The May 1, 2011 concert in East Rutherford at the New Meadowlands Stadium was a part of "The Bamboozle", but Monáe was not part of the show.)	East Rutherford	United States	New Meadowlands Stadium	N/A
May 4	New York City	United States	Roseland Ballroom	Plan B
May 6	Stony Brook	United States	Stony Brook University Arena	Plan B
May 7	Camden	United States	Susquehanna Bank Center	Plan B
May 8	Boston	United States	Agganis Arena	Plan B
May 10	Atlanta	United States	Fox Theatre Atlanta	Plan B
May 11	Miami Beach	United States	Miami Beach Convention Center	Plan B
May 17	Grand Prairie	United States	Verizon Theatre at Grand Prairie	Plan B
May 18	Houston	United States	Reliant Arena	Plan B & Patrick Stump
May 20 (Note: The May 20, 2011 concert in Montgomery at the Montgomery Riverfront Amphitheatre was a part of the "Jubilee CityFest".)	Montgomery	United States	Montgomery Riverfront Amphitheatre	Plan B & Patrick Stump
May 21 (Note: The May 21, 2011 concert in Baltimore at the Pimlico Race Course was a part of the "Preakness InfieldFest".)	Baltimore	United States	Pimlico Race Course	N/A
May 22	Windsor	Canada	Caesars Windsor	Plan B & Patrick Stump
May 24	Milwaukee	United States	Eagles Ballroom	Plan B
May 25	Saint Paul	United States	Roy Wilkins Auditorium	Plan B
May 27	Chicago	United States	Aragon Ballroom	Plan B
May 28	Kansas City	United States	Uptown Theatre	Mayer Hawthorne & the County
May 29	Broomfield	United States	1stBank Center	Mayer Hawthorne & the County
May 30	Orem	United States	UCCU Center	Mayer Hawthorne & the County
June 2	Seattle	United States	WaMu Theater	Mayer Hawthorne & the County
June 3	Vancouver	Canada	Rogers Arena	Mayer Hawthorne & the County
June 4	Portland	United States	Theater of the Clouds	Mayer Hawthorne & the County
June 7	Reno	United States	Grand Sierra Resort	Mayer Hawthorne & the County
June 8	San Francisco	United States	Bill Graham Civic Auditorium	Mayer Hawthorne & the County
June 10	Coachella	United States	Spotlight 29 Casino	Mayer Hawthorne & the County
June 11 (Note: The June 11, 2011 concert in Del Mar at the Del Mar Fairgrounds was a part of the "San Diego County Fair".)	Del Mar	United States	Del Mar Fairgrounds	Mayer Hawthorne & the County
June 12	Universal City	United States	Gibson Amphitheatre	Mayer Hawthorne & the County
June 14	Universal City	United States	Gibson Amphitheatre	N/A
June 15	Phoenix	United States	Comerica Theatre	Mayer Hawthorne & the County
June 16	Las Vegas	United States	Pearl Concert Theater	N/A

== Box office score data ==
List of concerts, showing date, city, venue, tickets sold, number of available tickets and amount of gross revenue
Date (2011)	City	Venue	Attendance	Revenue
May 8	Boston	Agganis Arena	5,973 / 6,215 (96%)	$197,109
May 10	Atlanta	Atlanta Fox Theatre	4,251 / 4,251 (100%)	$148,785
May 18	Grand Prairie	Verizon Theatre	4,905 / 6,317 (78%)	$168,945
May 22	Windsor	Caesars Windsor	4,541 / 4,934 (92%)	$198,024
May 25	Saint Paul	Roy Wilkins Auditorium	4,654 / 4,654 (100%)	$153,582
May 27	Chicago	Aragon Ballroom	4,873 / 4,873 (100%)	$157,154
June 4	Portland	Theatre of the Clouds	3,750 / 4,004 (94%)	$131,250
June 8	San Francisco	Bill Graham Civic Auditorium	8,211 / 8,211 (100%)	$307,913
Total			41,158 / 43,729	$1,462,762

== Personnel ==
Credits adapted from several sources.

The Hooligans

- Bruno Mars – vocals
- Philip Lawrence – backup vocals
- Phredley Brown – keyboard
- Jamareo Artis – bass guitar
- Eric Hernandez – drums
- Kameron Whalum – trombone
- Dwayne Dugger – saxophone
- James King – trumpet
- Kenji Chan – lead guitar

Management

- Shaun Hoffman – tour manager
- Randy Phillips – chief of concert promoter, for AEG (2011 Hooligans in Wondaland tour)
- Brandon Creed – personnel management, for Creed Company

Production

- Cory FitzGerald – lighting designer
- LeRoy Bennett – lighting designer
- Derek Brener – FOH for Mars
- Mike Graham – monitors for Mars
- Reggie Griffith – FOH assistant for Monáe, mixing
- Alex McCloud – monitors for Monáe
- Nate "Rocket" Wonder – mixing for Monáe
- Ben Rothstein – Clair systems technician
- James Berry – monitor engineer
