= The Doo-Wops & Hooligans Tour =

2010–12 concert tour by Bruno Mars

- World tour by Bruno Mars
- Promotional poster for the tour
- Location: Asia; Europe; North America; Oceania; South America
- Associated album: Doo-Wops & Hooligans
- Start date: November 16, 2010
- End date: January 28, 2012
- No. of shows: 74

Bruno Mars concert chronology
- The Doo-Wops & Hooligans Tour (2010–12); Hooligans in Wondaland Tour (2011)

The Doo-Wops & Hooligans Tour was the first headlining concert tour by American singer and songwriter Bruno Mars. Launched in support of his 2010 debut studio album Doo-Wops & Hooligans, the tour was announced in October 2010 and included dates in North America, Europe, Asia, Oceania, the Caribbean and South America.

The tour began in the United States on November 16, 2010, before moving on to Europe and Oceania. In mid-April 2011, Mars joined Janelle Monáe for a co-headline tour of North America dubbed Hooligans in Wondaland. This tour ended in mid-June and the Doo-Wops & Hooligans tour resumed, alternating between North America and Europe over the next seven months. The tour ended in Brazil in January 2012.

The tour set list featured most of the songs from the Doo-Wops & Hooligans album, as well as two covers of songs by other artists on which Mars had been a featured vocalist, B.o.B's "Nothin' on You" and Travie McCoy's "Billionaire". It also typically featured four or more covers of older tracks, which differed from one concert to another. Among these were Barrett Strong's "Money (That's What I Want)", The White Stripes' "Seven Nation Army", Aaliyah's "Rock the Boat" and two Michael Jackson songs. On one of the tour's European legs, a recent song at that time, "It Will Rain", was also performed, featuring guest artist Skylar Grey.

Mars's personal performances on the tour received high praise from some critics, who commended him for his professionalism, showmanship and singing, with several comparing his stage presence to that of Prince and/or Jackson. Critics were more divided on the overall impact of the show, with some very enthusiastic, while others were critical of some of the material or arrangements. The tour was nominated for a Pollstar award.

== Background and development ==
On September 9, 2010, it was announced that Bruno Mars would promote his 2010 debut album Doo-Wops & Hooligans as the opening act for Maroon 5 and OneRepublic, on the fall leg of the Palm Trees & Power Lines Tour in North America. Afterwards, Mars joined Travie McCoy to co-headline a European tour, which ran from October 18 to November 3, 2010.

Mars performed the first dates of his headline concerts, The Doo-Wops & Hooligans Tour, in the United States from November 16 to November 30. On November 11, tickets for additional dates for the North America leg of the tour went on sale. Dates for Europe and Oceania were announced in January 2011. The initial setlist included seven songs from the Doo-Wops & Hooligans album, an unreleased track and three covers.

In February 2011, a co-headlining tour between Mars and Janelle Monáe was announced, dubbed the Hooligans in Wondaland Tour. This tour was completed in North America in May and June 2011, after which the Doo-Wops and Hooligans tour resumed in July.

== Concert summary ==
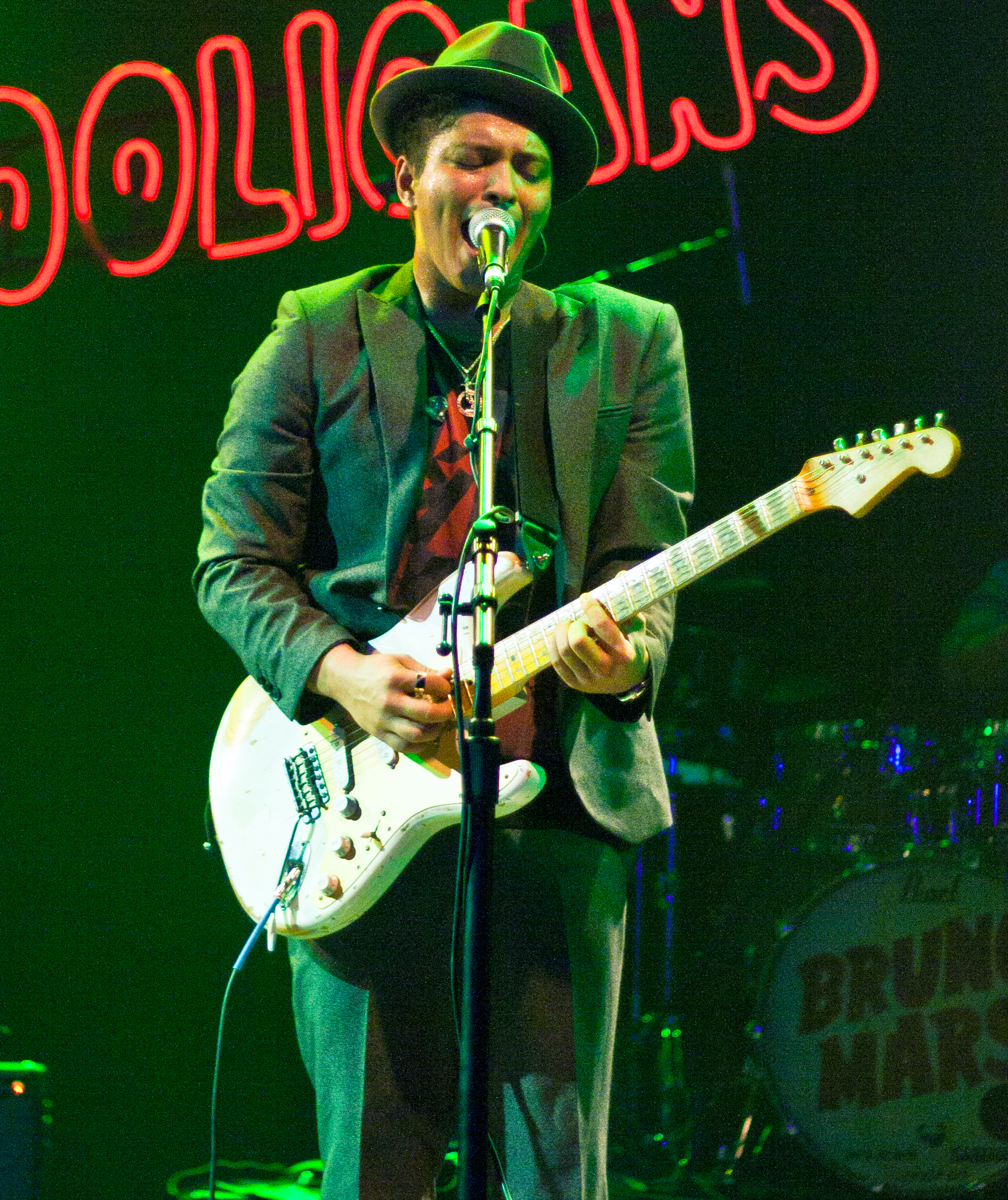
Mars performing in Houston, Texas, on November 24, 2010

American rapper Donnis opened for the first leg of the North American tour. Alex Hepburn appeared at some of the European shows, while hip-hop duo Diafrix supported Mars in Australia. Mars performed with his band, the Hooligans, which consisted of Phillip Lawrence (backup vocals), Phredley Brown (keyboard), Jamareo Artis (bass), Eric Hernandez (drums), Kameron Whalum, Dwayne Dugger and James King (horns), and Kenji Chan (guitar). (Note: Mars's band references can be seen in the Personnel section under Band) Mars wore a black suit and tie at some shows in the United Kingdom. He used a Fender Stratocaster guitar. The set for the tour was about 75 minutes long, and included rehearsed comedic interludes.

The concerts opened to the fanfare of Richard Strauss' symphonic tone poem Also sprach Zarathustra, heralding Mars's arrival on stage. This was evidently in homage to one of Mars's musical heroes, Elvis Presley, who used the same theme to open his 1973 comeback tour.

Mars would sometimes begin the concerts by playing an extended drum solo, before breaking into the first two numbers on the set list, "The Other Side" and "Top of The World", with Mars dancing to the latter. The third number was a mashup of Barrett Strong's "Money (That's What I Want)"—performed in "Beatlesque" style—and Travie McCoy's "Billionaire", a song on which Mars had been a featured vocalist on the commercial release. The fourth number was "Our First Time". In early concerts, this was followed by a mashup of Michael Jackson's" Billie Jean"—"comically" performed to the tune of Nirvana's "Smells Like Teen Spirit"—and The White Stripes' "Seven Nation Army". This mashup was later dropped in favor of "Runaway Baby".

In what one reviewer described as a high point of the concert, Mars would then perform a trio of songs: the ballad "Marry You", the novelty number "The Lazy Song", and the folksy "Count On Me", with the artist accompanying the latter on ukulele. Next on the setlist was originally a rendition of Mars's guest feature on B.o.B's "Nothin' on You", with Mars contributing one of the rap verses himself, but in later concerts, it was preceded by the addition to the setlist of "Liquor Store Blues".

Mars initially rounded off the concerts with a performance of "Just the Way You Are", and after leaving the stage, would return to perform his then-latest hit "Grenade" as an encore, with the live performance featuring the addition of "pumping beats". By mid-2011, the presentation of these two songs had been reversed, while for the encore, either a mashup of a shortened version of "Lighters" and "Talking to the Moon" was used, or a medley of two Michael Jackson songs, "Dirty Diana" and "Billie Jean", on which Mars showcased his guitar skills. Some concerts included additional numbers, such as Aaliyah's "Rock the Boat" or, on the European circuit, Mars's "It Will Rain", featuring American singer-songwriter Skylar Grey as guest artist.

Audiences were reportedly composed largely of women and girls in their early twenties or younger, but also included a fair proportion of young men and older fans. Mars typically worked to establish a good rapport with his audiences; in one concert, for example, he dedicated a song to "one lucky girl", while another number was dedicated to "each and every" attendee. He strongly encouraged audience participation, treating some songs as a "back and forth" between audience and artist, or encouraging one side of the audience to compete for enthusiasm against the other. Even without prompting, audiences sang along.

== Critical reception ==
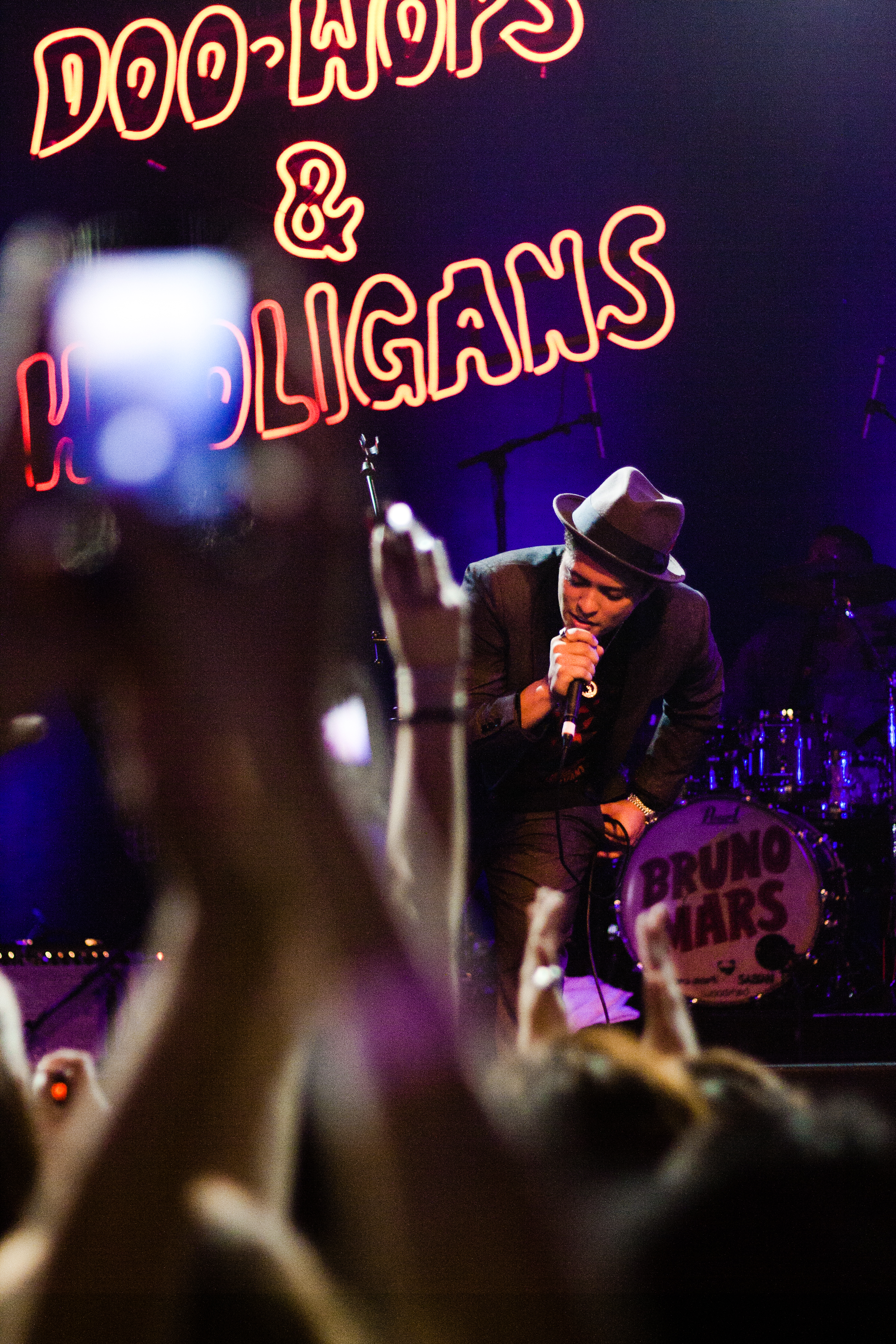
Mars performing in Houston, Texas, on November 24, 2010

Mars's personal performances on the tour attracted high praise from some critics, who commended him for his professionalism, showmanship and singing. Several compared his stage presence to that of two of his musical inspirations, Prince and Michael Jackson. Critics were more divided on the overall impact of the show, with some very enthusiastic, while others were lukewarm about some of the material or arrangements.

Ara Jansen of The West Australian said Mars came across as "positively dangerous and devastatingly confident in his musical skin", and that the show itself was "one of the most creative and exciting displays of musical artistry seen in a long time." She went on to presciently describe Mars as "a superstar in the making". Lynn Olanoff of The Express-Times described the show as "fun, exciting and sexy", and complimented Mars on his "soaring tenor voice", which she thought was best highlighted on the ballads. Deanna Ramsay of The Jakarta Post similarly praised Mars's "superb vocal abilities" and "skilful falsetto", which in live performance she thought fully lived up to his studio recordings. She described Mars, with his mixed-race background, as "a good example of what a truly global star can look like, able to traverse boundaries and effecting a true likeability and charm while managing that delicate balance of wholesome schoolboy and rebellious hoodlum".

Neil McCormick of The Daily Telegraph said that while some of Mars's studio recordings, particularly his ballads, might lead one to dismiss him as a "cheesy featherweight", there was an unexpected "heat and intensity" to his live performance, which combined with "a swaggering musicality and showmanship", was "almost ludicrously entertaining." Gareth Grundy of The Guardian was less impressed by Mars than some of the other critics, conceding only that he made "a small amount of boy-next-door charm go some distance" and that there was "too much showbiz polish for the show to be souped-up karaoke". Jim Sullivan of the Boston Herald praised Mars for his "supple tenor voice" and "soulful" genre blending, but found some of the ballads "sappy".

Arrangements for songs on the tour setlist sometimes differed substantially from the studio versions. McCormick noted favorably that in the live performance, songs were "amped up, slowed down, and twisted around, so that even smouldering ballads can suddenly switch to percussive funk and power-chord rockers", with Mars "effortlessly" transitioning "from honey-dripping soul crooner to rock belter, while firing off sharp guitar solos." Some of these changes were, however, not always appreciated by critics, with Jansen complaining that Mar's voice was sometimes overpowered by the backing band, while Olanoff thought the addition of "pumping beats" to two of his biggest hits was not an improvement.

"Grenade", a song where the protagonist offers to perform various suicidal missions for love of his girl, was singled out for particular criticism, with McCormick finding it "whiny", while Nicki Escudero of the Phoenix New Times thought it an anticlimactic end to the concert, suggesting that the preceding number, "Just the Way You Are", would have made a more appropriate finale. Mars himself appears to have reached a similar conclusion, as the order of the two songs was switched in later performances.

=== Accolades ===
Mars earned a nomination for Best New Touring Artist at the Pollstar Awards in 2011.

== Set lists ==
The set lists given below were performed in November 2010 and August 2011, respectively. The list evolved over the course of the tour, and sometimes included other numbers. These included Aaliyah's "Rock the Boat", a medley of Michael Jackson's "Dirty Diana" and "Billie Jean" (performed as an encore), and "It Will Rain", a song penned by Mars while on tour and performed by featured artist Skylar Grey.

1. "The Other Side"
2. "Top of The World"
3. "Money (That's What I Want)" (Barrett Strong cover) / "Billionaire"
4. "Our First Time"
5. "Billie Jean" (Michael Jackson cover) / "Seven Nation Army" (The White Stripes cover)
6. "Marry You"
7. "The Lazy Song"
8. "Count on Me"
9. "Nothin' on You"
10. "Just the Way You Are"

Encore

11. "Grenade"

1. "The Other Side"
2. "Top of The World"
3. "Money (That's What I Want)" / "Billionaire"
4. "Our First Time"
5. "Runaway Baby"
6. "Marry You"
7. "The Lazy Song"
8. "Count on Me"
9. "Liquor Store Blues"
10. "Nothin' on You"
11. "Grenade"
12. "Just the Way You Are"

Encore

13. "Lighters"/ "Talking to the Moon"

== Tour dates ==
List of concerts, showing date, city, country, continent, venue and opening act
| Date | City | Country | Continent | Venue | Opening act |
|---|---|---|---|---|---|
| November 16, 2010 | San Francisco | United States | North America | Slim's | Donnis |
| November 19, 2010 | San Diego | United States | North America | Price Center | N/A |
| November 20, 2010 | Scottsdale | United States | North America | Martini Ranch | Donnis |
| November 23, 2010 | Dallas | United States | North America | The Loft | Donnis |
| November 24, 2010 | Houston | United States | North America | Warehouse Live | Donnis |
| November 26, 2010 | Sauget | United States | North America | Pop's | Donnis |
| November 27, 2010 | Chicago | United States | North America | Bottom Lounge | Donnis |
| November 28, 2010 | Cleveland Heights | United States | North America | Grog Shop | Donnis |
| November 30, 2010 | Boston | United States | North America | Paradise Rock Club | Donnis |
| December 19, 2010 | Honolulu | United States | North America | Neal S. Blaisdell Arena | N/A |
| December 21, 2010 | Kahului | United States | North America | Maui Arts & Cultural Center | N/A |
| January 24, 2011 | London | England | Europe | Café de Paris | N/A |
| March 3, 2011 | Berlin | Germany | Europe | Postbahnhof | Alex Hepburn |
| March 5, 2011 | Paris | France | Europe | La Cigale | Alex Hepburn |
| March 6, 2011 | Amsterdam | Netherlands | Europe | Paradiso | Alex Hepburn |
| March 7, 2011 | Stuttgart | Germany | Europe | Rohre | Alex Hepburn |
| March 9, 2011 | Dublin | Ireland | Europe | Olympia Theatre | N/A |
| March 10, 2011 | Manchester | England | Europe | Manchester Academy | N/A |
| March 11, 2011 | Glasgow | Scotland | Europe | O2 ABC Glasgow | N/A |
| March 13, 2011 | London | England | Europe | Koko | N/A |
| March 14, 2011 | London | England | Europe | Koko | N/A |
| March 15, 2011 | Birmingham | England | Europe | HMV Institute | N/A |
| March 17, 2011 | Cologne | Germany | Europe | Gloria | Alex Hepburn |
| March 18, 2011 | Munich | Germany | Europe | Theaterfabrik | Alex Hepburn |
| March 20, 2011 | Hamburg | Germany | Europe | Docks | Alex Hepburn |
| March 23, 2011 | Copenhagen | Denmark | Europe | Store Vega | Alex Hepburn |
| April 5, 2011 | Jakarta | Indonesia | Asia | Istora Senayan | N/A |
| April 7, 2011 | Cebu City | Philippines | Asia | Waterfront Hotel | N/A |
| April 8, 2011 | Quezon City | Philippines | Asia | Araneta Coliseum | N/A |
| April 10, 2011 | Kuala Lumpur | Malaysia | Asia | Putra World Trade Center | N/A |
| April 12, 2011 | Perth | Australia | Oceania | Astor Theatre | Diafrix |
| April 14, 2011 | Sydney | Australia | Oceania | Big Top Sydney | Diafrix |
| April 15, 2011 | Adelaide | Australia | Oceania | Thebarton Theatre | Diafrix |
| April 16, 2011 | Melbourne | Australia | Oceania | Festival Hall | Diafrix |
| April 18, 2011 | Auckland | New Zealand | Oceania | Vector Arena | Diafrix |
| July 1, 2011 (Note: The July 1, 2011 concert in London at the Hyde Park was a part of the "Wireless Festival".) | London | England | Europe | Hyde Park | N/A |
| July 5, 2011 | Amsterdam | Netherlands | Europe | Heineken Music Hall | N/A |
| July 6, 2011 | Paris | France | Europe | Paris Olympia | N/A |
| July 8, 2011 (Note: The July 8, 2011 concert in London at The Roundhouse was a part of the "iTunes Festival".) | London | England | Europe | The Roundhouse | N/A |
| July 9, 2011 (Note: The July 9, 2011 concert in Punchestown at the Punchestown Racecourse was a part of the "Oxegen".) | Punchestown | Ireland | Europe | Punchestown Racecourse | N/A |
| July 10, 2011 (Note: The July 10, 2011 concert in Kinross at the Balado was a part of the "T in the Park".) | Kinross | Scotland | Europe | Balado | N/A |
| August 16, 2011 | London | England | Europe | HMV Hammersmith Apollo | N/A |
| August 17, 2011 | London | England | Europe | HMV Hammersmith Apollo | N/A |
| August 18, 2011 | Birmingham | England | Europe | O2 Academy Birmingham | N/A |
| August 20, 2011 (Note: The August 20, 2011 concert in Chelmsford at the Hylands Park was a part of the "V Festival".) | Chelmsford | England | Europe | Hylands Park | N/A |
| August 21, 2011 (Note: The August 21, 2011 concert in Staffordshire at the Weston Park was a part of the "V Festival".) | Staffordshire | England | Europe | Weston Park | N/A |
| August 30, 2011 (Note: August 30, 2011 concert in Allentown at the Allentown Fairgrounds was a part of the Great Allentown Fair.) | Allentown | United States | North America | Allentown Fairgrounds | N/A |
| August 31, 2011 (Note: The August 31, 2011 concert in Syracuse at the New York State Fairgrounds was a part of the "New York State Fair".) | Syracuse | United States | North America | New York State Fairgrounds | N/A |
| September 1, 2011 | Essex Junction | United States | North America | Champlain Valley Exposition | N/A |
| September 3, 2011 | Nassau | Bahamas | North America | Atlantis Paradise Grand Ballroom | N/A |
| September 8, 2011 | San Juan | Puerto Rico | North America | Coliseo de Puerto Rico José Miguel Agrelot | N/A |
| September 15, 2011 (Note: The September 15, 2011 concert in Baden-Baden at the Festspielhaus Baden-Baden was a part of the "New POP Festival".) | Baden-Baden | Germany | Europe | Festspielhaus Baden-Baden | N/A |
| September 23, 2011 | Las Vegas | United States | North America | MGM Grand Garden Arena | N/A |
| October 3, 2011 | Valby | Denmark | Europe | Valby-Hallen | Skylar Grey |
| October 5, 2011 | Hamburg | Germany | Europe | Alsterdorfer Sporthalle | Skylar Grey |
| October 6, 2011 | Berlin | Germany | Europe | Max-Schmeling-Halle | Skylar Grey |
| October 8, 2011 | Munich | Germany | Europe | Zenith | Skylar Grey |
| October 10, 2011 | Milan | Italy | Europe | Mediolanum Forum | Skylar Grey |
| October 12, 2011 | Vienna | Austria | Europe | Wiener Stadthalle | Skylar Grey |
| October 13, 2011 | Zürich | Switzerland | Europe | Hallenstadion | Skylar Grey |
| October 15, 2011 | Oberhausen | Germany | Europe | König Pilsener Arena | Skylar Grey |
| October 16, 2011 | Frankfurt | Germany | Europe | Jahrhunderthalle | Skylar Grey |
| October 17, 2011 | Esch-sur-Alzette | Luxembourg | Europe | Rockhal | Skylar Grey |
| October 19, 2011 | Brussels | Belgium | Europe | Forest National | Skylar Grey |
| October 20, 2011 | Paris | France | Europe | Zénith de Paris | Skylar Grey |
| October 21, 2011 | Nantes | France | Europe | Zénith Nantes Métropole | Skylar Grey |
| October 23, 2011 | London | England | Europe | Brixton Academy | Skylar Grey |
| October 31, 2011 | Glasgow | Scotland | Europe | Scottish Exhibition and Conference Centre | Tanya Lacey |
| November 1, 2011 | Nottingham | England | Europe | Capital FM Arena | Tanya Lacey |
| November 2, 2011 | Manchester | England | Europe | O2 Apollo Manchester | Tanya Lacey |
| January 19, 2012 | Santiago | Chile | South America | Movistar Arena | Madvanna |
| January 21, 2012 (Note: The January 21, 2012 concert in Mar del Plata at the Mute Club de Mar was a part of the "Fiesta de la P".) | Mar del Plata | Argentina | South America | Mute Club de Mar | Babasónicos & Zolvein Vixon |
| January 24, 2012 (Note: The January 24, 2012 concert in São Paulo at the Anhembi Convention Center was a part of the "Summer Soul Festival".) | São Paulo | Brazil | South America | Anhembi Convention Center | N/A |
| January 25, 2012 (Note: The January 25, 2012 concert in Rio de Janeiro at the HSBC Arena was a part of the "Summer Soul Festival".) | Rio de Janeiro | Brazil | South America | HSBC Arena | N/A |
| January 28, 2012 (Note: The January 28, 2012 concert in Florianópolis at the Stage Music Park was a part of the "Summer Soul Festival".) | Florianópolis | Brazil | South America | Stage Music Park | N/A |

List of cancelled concerts
| Date | City | Country | Continent | Venue | Reason |
|---|---|---|---|---|---|
| January 26, 2012 | Belo Horizonte | Brazil | South America | Mineirinho | Logistical problems |

== Box office score data ==
Partial list of concerts showing tickets sold compared to number of available tickets, and gross revenue
| Date (2011) | City | Venue | Attendance | Revenue |
|---|---|---|---|---|
| March 9 | Dublin | Olympia Theatre | 1,601 / 1,601 (100%) | $41,283 |
| April 18 | Auckland | Vector Arena | 7,117 / 7,616 (93%) | $304,695 |
| September 8 | San Juan | José Miguel Agrelot Coliseum | 8,183 / 8,183 (100%) | $585,213 |
| Total | | | 16,901 / 17,400 | $931,191 |

== Personnel ==
Credits adapted from several sources:

The Hooligans

- Bruno Mars – vocals
- Philip Lawrence – backup vocals
- Phredley Brown – keyboard
- Jamareo Artis – bass guitar
- Eric Hernandez – drums
- Kameron Whalum – trombone
- Dwayne Dugger – saxophone
- James King – trumpet
- Kenji Chan – lead guitar

Management

- Shaun Hoffman – tour manager
- Marty Diamond – touring agent, for Paradigm
- Matt Galle – touring agent, for Paradigm
- Emma Banks – touring agent, for Creative Artist Agency (United Kingdom, Europe)
- Brandon Creed – personnel management, for Creed Company

Production

- James Berry – monitor engineer
