= The Smeezingtons production discography =

The following list is a discography of production by The Smeezingtons, an American production and songwriting team from Los Angeles, California. It includes a list of songs produced, co-produced and remixed by year, artist, album and title.

== Singles produced ==
List of singles composed by The Smeezingtons, with selected chart positions, showing year released and album name
Title	Year	Peak chart positions										Certifications	Album
Title	Year	US	AUS	CAN	DEN	GER	IRL	NL	NZ	SWI	UK	Certifications	Album
"Get Sexy" (Sugababes)	2009	—	52	—	—	41	3	—	—	—	2		Sweet 7
"Wavin' Flag" (K'naan)	2009	82	—	2	16	1	2	2	—	1	2		Troubadour
"Nothin' on You" (B.o.B featuring Bruno Mars)	2009	1	3	10	24	22	7	1	5	28	1	RIAA: 2× Platinum; ARIA: Platinum; MC: Platinum; BPI: Gold; RIANZ: Gold	B.o.B Presents: The Adventures of Bobby Ray
"Billionaire" (Travie McCoy featuring Bruno Mars)	2010	4	5	12	8	16	2	1	2	14	3	RIAA: 2× Platinum; ARIA: 2× Platinum; BPI: Gold; RIANZ: Platinum	Lazarus
"Just the Way You Are" (Bruno Mars)	2010	1	1	1	6	2	1	1	1	1	1	RIAA: 5× Platinum; ARIA: 6× Platinum; BPI: 2× Platinum; BVMI: Platinum; IFPI DEN: Platinum; IFPI SWI: Platinum; MC: 5× Platinum; RIANZ: 2× Platinum	Doo-Wops & Hooligans
"Fuck You" (Cee Lo Green)	2010	2	5	11	2	11	6	1	5	13	1	RIAA: 5× Platinum; ARIA: 2× Platinum; BPI: Platinum; MC: 4× Platinum; RMNZ: Platinum	The Lady Killer
"Grenade" (Bruno Mars)	2010	1	1	1	1	1	1	1	1	1	1	RIAA: 5× Platinum; ARIA: 5× Platinum; BPI: Platinum; BVMI: Platinum; IFPI DEN: Platinum; IFPI SWI: 2× Platinum; MC: 5× Platinum; RIANZ: 2× Platinum	Doo-Wops & Hooligans
"Rocketeer" (Far East Movement featuring Ryan Tedder)	2010	7	18	22	—	40	25	47	4	—	14	ARIA: Platinum; RIANZ: Gold	Free Wired
"Bow Chicka Wow Wow" (Mike Posner featuring Lil Wayne)	2011	30	40	—	—	—	—	—	21	—	—		31 Minutes to Takeoff
"The Lazy Song" (Bruno Mars)	2011	4	6	5	1	9	4	4	3	9	1	RIAA: 3× Platinum; ARIA: 3× Platinum; BPI: Platinum; BVMI: Gold; IFPI DEN: Platinum; IFPI SWI: Platinum; MC: 4× Platinum; RIANZ: Platinum	Doo-Wops & Hooligans
"Lighters (Bad Meets Evil featuring Bruno Mars)	2011	4	17	4	18	26	11	18	2	10	10	RIAA: 2× Platinum; ARIA: Platinum; RIANZ: Gold; BPI: Silver	Hell: The Sequel
"Marry You" (Bruno Mars)	2011	85	8	10	32	15	5	22	5	16	11	RIAA: Platinum; ARIA: 2× Platinum; BPI: Gold; BVMI: Gold; IFPI DEN: Gold; IFPI SWI: Gold; MC: 2× Platinum; RIANZ: Gold	Doo-Wops & Hooligans
"It Will Rain" (Bruno Mars)	2011	3	14	5	14	14	11	35	2	22	14	RIAA: 3× Platinum; ARIA: 2× Platinum; BPI: Silver; IFPI DEN: Gold; IFPI SWI: Gold; MC: 3× Platinum; RIANZ: Platinum	The Twilight Saga: Breaking Dawn – Part 1
"Count on Me" (Bruno Mars)	2011	—	19	—	—	—	—	—	13	55	78	ARIA: 3× Platinum; RIANZ: Platinum	Doo-Wops & Hooligans
"Young, Wild & Free" (Snoop Dogg & Wiz Khalifa featuring Bruno Mars)	2011	7	4	15	21	15	33	12	2	21	44	RIAA: 3× Platinum; ARIA: 4× Platinum; BVMI: Gold; IFPI SWI: Gold; RIANZ: Platinum	Mac & Devin Go to High School (soundtrack)
"Never Close Our Eyes" (Adam Lambert)	2012	—	—	62	—	—	—	—	24	—	17		Trespassing
"Locked Out of Heaven" (Bruno Mars)	2012	1	4	1	2	7	4	5	4	8	2	RIAA: 4× Platinum; ARIA: 5× Platinum; BPI: Platinum; BVMI: Gold; IFPI DEN: 2× Platinum; IFPI SWI: Platinum; MC: 4× Platinum; RIANZ: 2× Platinum	Unorthodox Jukebox
"When I Was Your Man (Bruno Mars)	2013	1	6	3	4	23	6	7	4	12	2	RIAA: 4× Platinum; ARIA: 4× Platinum; BPI: Gold; IFPI DEN: 2× Platinum; MC: 3× Platinum; RIANZ: 2× Platinum	Unorthodox Jukebox
"Treasure (Bruno Mars)	2013	5	10	4	14	17	9	11	7	13	12	RIAA: 3× Platinum; ARIA: Platinum; BPI: Silver; IFPI DEN: Platinum; MC: Gold; RIANZ: Platinum	Unorthodox Jukebox
"Gorilla" (Bruno Mars)	2013	22	41	23	—	—	53	31	—	—	62	RIAA: Gold; ARIA: Gold; MC: Gold	Unorthodox Jukebox
"Young Girls" (Bruno Mars)	2013	32	62	19	—	—	78	—	23	—	83	RIAA: Gold; ARIA: Gold; MC: Gold	Unorthodox Jukebox
"—" denotes releases that did not chart.

== 2009 ==
=== Far East Movement – Animal ===
- 03. "3D" (featuring Bruno Mars) (produced with the Stereotypes)

=== K'naan – Troubadour ===
- 05. "Bang Bang" (featuring Adam Levine of Maroon 5)
- 07. "Wavin Flag (Coca-Cola Celebration Mix)" (2010)
- 16. "Biscuit" (Amazon.com bonus track)

=== Matisyahu – Light ===
- 03. "One Day"

=== Flo Rida – R.O.O.T.S. ===
- 05. "Right Round" (produced by Dr. Luke, Kool Kojak)

=== Sean Kingston – Tomorrow ===
- 07. "Island Queen"
- 08. "Tomorrow"

=== Jibbs – Non-album single ===
- 00. "The Dedication (Ay DJ)" (featuring Lloyd)

=== Travie McCoy – Non-album single ===
- 00. "One At a Time"

== 2010 ==
=== Sugababes – Sweet 7 ===
- 01. "Get Sexy"
- 06. "She's A Mess"
- 07. "Miss Everything" (featuring Sean Kingston)

=== B.o.B – B.o.B Presents: The Adventures of Bobby Ray ===
- 02. "Nothin' on You" (featuring Bruno Mars)

=== Bruno Mars – It's Better If You Don't Understand (EP) ===
- 01. "Somewhere in Brooklyn"
- 02. "The Other Side" (featuring Cee-Lo & B.o.B)
- 03. "Count on Me"
- 04. "Talking to the Moon"

=== Travie McCoy – Lazarus ===
- 01. "Dr. Feel Good" (featuring Cee-Lo Green)
- 03. "Billionaire" (featuring Bruno Mars)
- 07. "We'll Be Alright" (produced with the Stereotypes)

=== Shontelle – No Gravity ===
- 06. "DJ Made Me Do It" (featuring Asher Roth)

=== Mike Posner – 31 Minutes to Takeoff ===
- 03. "Bow Chicka Wow Wow"

=== Sean Kingston – Non-album single ===
- "Dumb Love"

=== Bruno Mars – Doo-Wops & Hooligans ===
- 01. "Grenade"
- 02. "Just the Way You Are"
- 03. "Our First Time"
- 04. "Runaway Baby"
- 05. "The Lazy Song"
- 06. "Marry You"
- 07. "Talking to the Moon"
- 08. "Liquor Store Blues" (featuring Damian Marley)
- 09. "Count on Me"
- 10. "The Other Side" (featuring Cee Lo Green & B.o.B)
- 11. "Somewhere In Brooklyn"

=== Far East Movement – Free Wired ===
- 01. "Girls On The Dancefloor" (featuring the Stereotypes) (produced with the Stereotypes)
- 03. "Rocketeer" (featuring Ryan Tedder) (produced with the Stereotypes)
- 04. "If I Was You (OMG)" (featuring Snoop Dogg) (produced with the Stereotypes)

=== Cee Lo Green – The Lady Killer ===
- 03. "Fuck You"

=== Flo Rida – Only One Flo (Part 1) ===
- 04. "Who Dat Girl" (featuring Akon) (produced by Dr. Luke & Benny Blanco)

=== Alexandra Burke – Overcome ===
- 05. "Perfect"

== 2011 ==
=== Bad Meets Evil – Hell: The Sequel ===
- 07. Lighters (featuring Bruno Mars) (produced with Eminem and Battle Roy)

=== Lil Wayne – Tha Carter IV ===
- 07. Mirror (featuring Bruno Mars) (produced with Ramon "REO" Owen of The Soundkillers)

=== Bruno Mars – The Twilight Saga: Breaking Dawn – Part 1 (soundtrack) ===
- 03. It Will Rain

=== Snoop Dogg & Wiz Khalifa – Mac & Devin Go to High School (soundtrack) ===
- 07. Young, Wild & Free (featuring Bruno Mars)

=== Charice – Infinity ===
- 07. Before It Explodes

== 2012 ==
=== Adam Lambert – Trespassing ===
- 04. "Never Close Our Eyes"

=== The Very Best – MTMTMK ===
- 12. "We OK" (featuring K'naan)

=== Nina Sky – Nicole and Natalie ===
- 01. "Starting Today"

=== Neon Hitch – Non-album single ===
- 00. Gold

=== Bruno Mars – Unorthodox Jukebox ===
- 01."Young Girls"
- 02."Locked Out of Heaven"
- 03."Gorilla"
- 04."Treasure"
- 05."Moonshine"
- 06."When I Was Your Man"
- 07."Natalie"
- 08."Show Me"
- 09."Money Make Her Smile"
- 10."If I Knew"
- 11."Old & Crazy" (featuring Esperanza Spalding)

== 2013 ==
=== 98 Degrees – 2.0 ===
- 11."The Long Way Home"

== 2014 ==
=== Big Gipp – Mr. Get Down ===
- 07. "Sugar, Cocoa and Honey" (featuring Bruno Mars)

== 2015 ==
=== Adele – 25 ===
- 10."All I Ask"

== Unknown date ==
=== Jibbs ===
- "Get a Room"

=== J Soul Brothers ft. Sandaime ===
- "Heaven"

=== Tina Parol ===
- "I Can Make You Love Me"

== Other songs ==
- "Cricket Communications"
- "Dance In The Mirror" - Bruno Mars
- "Don't Stop"
- "Faded"- Bruno Mars
- "Good Luck"
- "Killa On The Run"- Bruno Mars
- "Killin' Dem"
- "Ladies Is Pimps Too" - Bruno Mars
- "Mama's Worst Nightmare" - Bruno Mars
- "Never Say You Can't" - Bruno Mars
- "Stayin' Alive"
- "These Girls"
- "Today My Life Begins" - Bruno Mars
