= Moonshine (Bruno Mars song) =

2012 promotional single by Bruno Mars

Promotional single by Bruno Mars

from the album Unorthodox Jukebox
- Released: November 19, 2012
- Studio: Levcon (Los Angeles, California)
- Genre: Pop; power pop; R&B
- Length: 3:48
- Label: Atlantic; WEG
- Songwriters: Bruno Mars; Philip Lawrence; Ari Levine; Andrew Wyatt; Jeff Bhasker; Mark Ronson
- Producers: The Smeezingtons; Jeff Bhasker; Mark Ronson

"Moonshine" is a song by American singer-songwriter Bruno Mars from his second studio album Unorthodox Jukebox (2012). It was released as the second promotional single on November 19, 2012, by Atlantic Records. "Moonshine" is a pop, power pop and R&B record, with a "retro" vibe. It was written by Mars, Philip Lawrence, Ari Levine, Andrew Wyatt, Jeff Bhasker and Mark Ronson. It was produced by the former three, under their alias, the Smeezingtons, Bhasker and Ronson. Its lyrics establish a metaphor between "bootleg liquor" and the "longing for the high water mark of a relationship", which becomes "impossible to reach".

It received generally favorable reviews from music critics, who compared its composition to the works of Michael Jackson and Prince. Commercially, "Moonshine" charted only in South Korea, where it reached number 17, along with the release of its parent album. In 2013, it charted on the Belgium Ultratop 50 Flanders at number 30. On the following year, it debuted in France, spending 11 weeks on the chart, and Poland peaking at number 113 and 11, respectively. The song was performed as the opening act on The Moonshine Jungle Tour (2013–14) and sometimes during shows of Bruno Mars Live (2022–24).

== Background ==
During an interview, with Rolling Stone, Bruno Mars explained the origin of "Moonshine", by saying "We all [Mars, Ronson and Bhasker] went out one night, and they had actual moonshine on the menu. We drank it all night, then headed to the studio – Jeff got on keyboards, Mark starts playing electronic drums that sound like Eighties Prince and I started screaming, 'Moonshine, take us to the stars!' There were a lot of nights like that". The Smeezingtons spent three months trying to write a second verse for the song.

"Moonshine" was written by Mars, Philip Lawrence, Ari Levine, Andrew Wyatt, Jeff Bhasker and Mark Ronson. Its production was handled by the former three under their alias the Smeezingtons, along with Bhasker and Ronson. The song was recorded by Levine, with additional engineering by Charles Moniz. The guitar was played by Wyatt and Ronson, the latter also handled the bass and other beats, while the former contributed with backing vocals along with Bhasker. The lead singer performs the keyboards on the recording. The mixing of the track was done at Larrabee Sound Studios in North Hollywood by Manny Marroquin. It was mastered by David Kutch at The Mastering Place.

== Release ==
Upon the song lifting, Mars tweeted "Ive been jammin to this song for a while now. I hope yall can groove wit me and slide wit me but most important BOK wit me #Moonshine". "Moonshine" was released digitally as a promotional single in the United States on November 19, 2012, as part of the iTunes countdown through Atlantic Records. In countries outside of the US it as liberated by Warner Entertainment Group on the same date. It was announced on the Brazilian website of Warner Music Group that the track was set to be released on contemporary hit radio as a single on October 25, 2013, in Europe and South America, while "Gorilla" had been sent to United States and Oceania mainstream radio. Nevertheless, it was replaced by Gorilla as the fourth single.

A remix of the song, made by The Futuristics (Alex Schwartz and Joe Khajadourian), was exclusively released as bonus track on the Target edition of the album, on December 11, 2012. Almost a year later, on November 5, 2013, the remix of the song was also included on the deluxe edition of the album, released in various countries.

== Composition and lyrics ==
"Moonshine"
A 21-second sample of "Moonshine"'s chorus, similar to "Heartbeat" (1986) by Don Johnson.

"Moonshine" is a midtempo pop, power pop, and R&B song. Critics noticed being heavily influenced by quiet storm and dance-pop, while having a "disco groove", as well as, having a "retro" and "slightly ’80s-informed" vibe. Mitchell Peters, while writing the Billboard cover story where Mars was featured, called "Moonshine" a "sexed-up rocker" According to the sheet music published at Music Notes, the recording is composed in the key of A minor with a time signature in common time, and a moderate groove of 104 beats per minute. As the track progresses "flanged guitar notes and moody chord progressions" can be heard with "cheesy flecks of synthesizer". The song lope is "amusing Simple Minds-like" and its chorus is similar to "Heartbeat" (1986) by Don Johnson. A bass guitar, drums and additional beats are also part of its instrumentation.

The subject addressed in the recording lyrics has led Spin's critic, Chris Martins, to become "slightly disappointed" when he realized that "the song was not, in fact, an ode to bootleg liquor", but a "longing for the high water mark of a relationship that now seems impossible to reach", despite the fact that "Mars’ lyrics intoxicate in their own way". Brittany Spanos of Rolling Stone found the lyrics to "compares a woman to the distilled liquor", as Mars tries to recreate the "magic" when they were together the last time. The recording's composition brought attention due to its similarities to the works of Michael Jackson. Martins of Spin stated that the track finds Mars channeling "the King of Pop with a markedly more reverent aplomb". Sam Lansky of Idolator concurred, writing that the artist is channeling "80's pop icon: Michael Jackson". Nevertheless, Lansky discovered "a little bit of Prince in there", as well, "but Mars’ vocals sound eerily like Jacko in his prime". The song has drawn comparisons to Daft Punk due to its "disco groove", with Sarah Rodman from The Boston Globe calling it "wistful" and Los Angeles Times' Mikael Wood called it "conflict-free tune" gritting with "desperation". Mars said that the primary influence for the track was American musician Prince.

== Critical reception ==
The song received generally favorable reviews from critics, who couldn't help to avoid comparisons between the track and Michael Jackson's work. Chris Martins of Spin called the recording "'wonderfall', stating that was something that "Mars might say". He also wrote that the track was an "80's-informed backing track". Sam Lanksy of Idolator praised the track, saying "fortunately" the drinking during the recording sections "paid off on the song" since it "is probably our favorite effort from Mars to date". Jason Lipshut of Billboard wrote that "The production is so buttery that the listener can't help but get another sugar rush". Joe DeAndrea of the same publication, while reviewing Mars' 5 Best Deep Cuts, opined "one of the most eclectic songs Mars has ever delivered...with a retro pop feel and a slight disco vibe to it, Mars unleashes a dose of musical ecstasy." In a mixed review, Jon Caramanica of New York Times called it "melodramatic and spry", furthering "the song feels bigger than the contours Mr. Mars can give it. It demands a yowler. It could use Adam Lambert".

== Commercial performance ==
Following the release of Unorthodox Jukebox in 2012, "Moonshine" debuted at number 17 on the South Korea International Download Chart, with 11, 360 copies sold. In 2013, the track entered in the Ultratop 50 Flanders chart, debuting at its peak position 30. In the same year, it also peaked at number 41 on the Finnish Airplay chart. On January 4, 2014, it debuted at number one on the Tipparade in the Netherlands. On the following week, the song entered the Dutch Top 40 and eventually it peaked at number 32. During the same month, it also charted on the French single charts, spending 11 weeks, peaking at number 113 in its sixth week. It peaked at number 11 on the Polish Airplay Top 100.

== Personnel ==
Credits adapted from the liner notes of Unorthodox Jukebox.

- Bruno Mars – lead vocals, songwriting, keyboards
- Philip Lawrence – songwriting
- Ari Levine – songwriting, recording
- The Smeezingtons – production
- Jeff Bhasker – production, songwriting, backing vocals
- Emile Haynie – production, songwriting
- Mark Ronson – production, songwriting, guitar, bass, beats
- Andrew Wyatt – songwriting, guitar, backing vocals
- Charles Moniz – additional engineer
- Manny Marroquin – mixing
- David Kutch – mastering

== Charts ==
=== Weekly charts ===
List of chart positions
Chart (2012–14)	Peak position
Belgium (Ultratop 50 Flanders)	30
Belgium (Ultratip Bubbling Under Wallonia)	4
Finland Airplay (Radiosoittolista)	41
France (SNEP)	113
Netherlands (Dutch Top 40)	32
Netherlands (Single Top 100)	81
Poland Airplay (ZPAV)	11
Slovakia Airplay (ČNS IFPI)	62
South Korea International Singles (Gaon)	17

== Release history ==
=== Promotional release ===
List of promotional release history, showing region(s), date, format and label(s)
Region	Date	Format	Label	Ref.
Brazil	November 19, 2012	Digital download (iTunes countdown single)	WEG	
United States	November 19, 2012	Digital download (iTunes countdown single)	Atlantic	

=== Canceled single release ===
List of canceled release history, showing region(s), date, format and label
Region	Date	Format	Label	Ref.
Europe	October 25, 2013	Contemporary hit radio	Warner Music Group	
South America	October 25, 2013	Contemporary hit radio	Warner Music Group	
