= Young Girls =

2013 single by Bruno Mars

Single by Bruno Mars

from the album Unorthodox Jukebox
- Released: November 26, 2013
- Studio: Levcon (Los Angeles, California)
- Genre: Pop
- Length: 3:49
- Label: Atlantic
- Songwriters: Bruno Mars; Philip Lawrence; Ari Levine; Jeff Bhasker; Emile Haynie; Mac Davis
- Producers: The Smeezingtons; Bhasker; Haynie

Bruno Mars singles chronology
"Gorilla" (2013)	"Young Girls" (2013)	"Uptown Funk" (2014)

"Young Girls" is a song by American singer-songwriter Bruno Mars. It was composed by Mars, Philip Lawrence and Ari Levine, a songwriting and record production trio known as the Smeezingtons, as well as Jeff Bhasker, and Emile Haynie, with additional songwriter credits by Mac Davis, for Mars's second studio album Unorthodox Jukebox (2012). It is a midtempo, doo-wop-influenced pop ballad that garnered comparisons to Mars's "It Will Rain" and Lana Del Rey's music. Its instrumentation includes drums, synths, piano and elements of electro music. The song was released as the first promotional single and later as the fifth overall single from Unorthodox Jukebox, being first serviced to contemporary hit radio in Australia on November 26, 2013.

"Young Girls" received generally mixed to positive reviews. Many music critics noted the complex instrumental and praised Mars's vocals on the record. Its lyrics, detailing the fact of the singer being unable to resist his attraction to young girls, were met with criticism. The single was recognized as the Best Pop of 2013 at the MelOn Music Awards. Commercially, "Young Girls" charted in some countries, along with the released of its parent album, such as South Korea, where it reached number one, United Kingdom and Canada. Before it was canceled as the second single it peaked in Australia and New Zealand at 62 and 23, respectively. As the fifth single it reached the position of 19 in Canada and 32 in the United States. It was certified platinum by the Recording Industry Association of America (RIAA), the Recorded Music NZ (RNMZ) and double platinum by Music Canada (MC). The track was performed live on Saturday Night Live and occasionally on The Moonshine Jungle Tour (2013–14).

== Background and writing ==
During a MTV interview, Bruno Mars explained why the track was the first on the track list of the album "It really shows you what this album is going to be, and just where I was when I started" it. He felt that anyone can easily relate to the record "There's a moment in your life where you start going out every night, and it's so fun, but then you start to lose yourself". The singer compared the song's sentiment to "Lookin' for Love in All the Wrong Places", adding "It's another confession". In a different interview Mars furthered the concept of the track as it's about you "losing yourself", which happened to him in L.A. during his early years. He added, "If you're out there wilding out, drinking and partying, that's not real life."

Mars stated that he felt like "an old blues man" when writing the song, and wanted to re-create the sentiment when some young girls were giving him the "runaround". Furthermore, he wasn't willing to stay too far from his roots when it comes to writing lyrics for his album, explaining "I'm not there yet...to sing about politics". He concluded that writing and singing songs about girls is what he knows best, "I'm not going to preach what I don't know. As much as I love 2 Chainz's "All I Want for My Birthday" (2012).

A demo of the song, only featuring the vocals and an acoustic guitar, was exclusively released as bonus track on the Target edition of the album, on December 11, 2012. Almost a year later, on November 5, 2013, the demo of the song was also included on the deluxe edition of the album, released in various countries. The song was re-registered with a new writing credit for Mac Davis. Davis explained he met Jeff Bhasker, who was in the studio with Mars, through Neil Jacobson. Bhasker asked him to come to the studio and at that time they were looking at a rhyme for the chorus. Davis ended up writing the hook. He won a BMI Pop Award in 2015 due to his work on this song.

== Production and release ==
"Young Girls" was written by Mars, Philip Lawrence, Levine, Bhasker, Emile Haynie and Davis, while production was handled by the former three under their alias, the Smeezingtons, along with Bhasker and Haynie. The song was recorded by Levine at Levcon Studios in Los Angeles and mixed by Manny Marroquin at Larrabee Sound Studios in North Hollywood, California. Charles Moniz served as the track's additional engineer, Brent Kolatalo and Ken Lewis engineered the big drums. It was mastered by David Kutch at The Mastering Place.

"Young Girls" was first performed on Saturday Night Live and was released as the first promotional single taken from Unorthodox Jukebox, on November 6, 2012, on iTunes. Later, it was reported by Mars that the record was scheduled to be the second single from the album. This release involved little planning according to Mars "I felt [it] was good. None of these things are planned, which one goes first, which one goes second. One day I wake up and I say, 'You know what? I want the world to hear this song that I wrote called 'Young Girls,' and I put it out". However, a week later, while performing "When I Was Your Man" on the third-season finale of The Voice, he announced that the track played would be the second official single from the album. The fifth and overall single, "Young Girls", was first released in Australia, on November 26, 2013, after being promoted by Mars in radio station, Nova. Subsequently, the song was issued to United States and United Kingdom contemporary hit radios on December 10, 2013, and February 17, 2014, respectively. Italian radio stations began adding the track onto their playlists on February 26, 2014.

== Composition and lyrics ==
"Young Girls"
A 21-second sample of the song, where Mars sings the chorus "All you young wild girls/ You make a mess of me/ Yeah, you young wild girls/ You'll be the death for me, the death for me/ All you young wild girls/ No matter what you do."

"Young Girls" is a "woeful" midtempo pop ballad. The "pop anthem" is also influenced by a groove from Mars's debut studio album, noticeable on the backing vocals, and it contains elements of "the shaded earnestness" found in "It Will Rain". According to the sheet music, the song is composed in the key of A major with a time signature in common time, and a moderate groove of 125 beats per minute.

The song opens with "methodical strings" mixed with "quadruplets, floppy and fuzz wind in the opening bars", along with synths and a piano as Mars's vocal delivery "soars". The music progresses with a "thumping martial beat" on the percussion of the "heavy drums", reminding "Phil Spector –esque tom-toms", and they "counterpoint to the ascendant melody" with "bits of electro" fading in the background. The chorus would fit in a "60's girl group" due to the join forces of Mars's "retro crooner sensibilities with modern sonic flourishes". Carl Williot of Idolator noted that the "delicate but dynamic production" on "Young Girls" is reminiscent of Lana Del Rey.

The lyrics to "Young Girls" follow the verse–pre-chorus–chorus pattern. It begins with the singer "dumbly" trying to get noticed by "these bright-eyed honeys", since he can't help to fall for their "dubious charms", despite "recognizing [the] sin while indulging in it". The song's lyrics are in the same vein as Gary Puckett & The Union Gap's "Young Girl" and The Knack's "My Sharona" as pointed out by HitFix's Melinda Newman. She added, the lyrics are "sweet" and tortuous as he sings "Oh, I still dream of a simple life/ Boy meets girl/ makes her his wife/ But love don't exist when you live like this... All these roads steer me wrong/ But I still drive them all night long/ all night long". There is a sentiment of "lament" in the song, "Oh you young wild girls/ You'll be the death of me".

== Reception ==
"Young Girls" debuted to mixed and positive reviews among critics. After its premiere during Mars's performance on Saturday Night Live, it became available as a studio version with Chris Martins of Spin labeling it an "epic studio-recorded glory". On a more thorough review, Idolator's Carl Williott found the production "dynamic" comparing it to compositions by Lana Del Rey and while "the pre-chorus could be from a 60's girl group", the "percussion and electro flitting in the background" is what makes pop music nowadays. He concluded, that it's "a flipside" to Mars's lead single. HitFix's critic Melinda Newman gave the track a B− rating, praising the melody and Mars's vocal delivery, writing "he makes it all sound so sweet, and as if he really is tortured by these young girls", but ultimately calling the lyrics "a little skeevy". Jon Caramanica of The New York Times, while reviewing the album, believed that it "swells something serious. The ambition is undeniable". He compared it to the music of U2 and Daughtry.

On mixed review, Andy Gill of The Independent, while describing Mars's "impassioned shame" on the lyrics called the track "enjoyable". The lyrics have not gone undecided for PopMatters' Matt Cibula who named them a "classic lament" and added "is as widescreen and wide-open as things get these days". The same could be said for Jason Lipshut who, while writing for Billboard, found Mars's "recognizing sin while indulging in it" on the "sleek" lyrics and composition. However, a "throwback vibe (established from the backing vocals) remain from Doo-Wops", while prospecting the earnest from "It Will Rain". On the other hand, Paste's Ryan Reed criticized Mars's for playing safe on "Young Girls", unlike most of the other tracks on the album. He explained that the singer "steps sideways" and the record "is a 'shout-out-to-the-honeys' belter" for various reasons. In 2013, "Young Girls" received an award at the MelOn Music Awards for the category "Best Pop".

== Commercial performance ==
"Young Girls" was able to chart in the United States on the Bubbling Under Hot 100, which acts as an extension of the Billboard Hot 100, at number 102 and entered at number 64 on the Canadian Hot 100 on November 24, 2012, two weeks after its release as a promotional single. Following the release of Unorthodox Jukebox, on December 12, 2012, the track re-entered at number 63 on the latter chart, it debuted in France at number 123, in the United Kingdom at number 141 and the song debuted at the top spot on the South Korea International Singles chart. In Australia, when the record was scheduled to be the second single, it debuted at number 62 and it made its first appearance at number 27 in the New Zealand charts, peaking at number 23 around the same time. The song was certified platinum by Recorded Music NZ (RMNZ).

On November 26, 2013, it was released as an official single in Australia. On the following week, it was the most added track to radio stations. Despite that, the highest position the single was able to peak was at number 62, when the song was set to be released as the second single. Nevertheless, the record was certified gold by the Australian Record Industry Association (ARIA). "Young Girls" reached its highest mark at number 83 in the United Kingdom, after its official release and was certified Silver by the British Phonographic Industry (BPI). The track peaked at number 32 on the Billboard Hot 100. In the Mainstream Top 40 the aforementioned song peaked inside the top 10, at number 9, something which the previous single was unable to do, thus ending the top 10 streak. It was certified platinum by the Recording Industry Association of America (RIAA). In Canada, the song peaked at number 19 and received a double platinum certification by Music Canada (MC). It made the 2013 year end list of the Canadian Hot 100.

== Music video ==
On December 12, 2012, it was reported for the first time that "Young Girls" would be the second single, a music video was already in production as of December 6, 2012 and was set to be directed by Cameron Duddy. Mars admitted to be spending a lot of his time thinking about the processing of the video, saying "It's going to be something I’ve never done before, I promise you that". A day before the performance on Victoria's Secret show an official audio video of the song was uploaded to YouTube. The official music video was never released.

== Live performances and covers ==
"Young Girls" made its debut during a performance on Saturday Night Live in October 2012. On December 4, 2012, Mars recorded performance on the Victoria's Secret Fashion Show, aired on CBS. Sam Lansky of Idolator said the performance during the Victoria's Secret Fashion Show was "impressive", despite the singer not being "runway-friendly as RiRi". On December 7, 2012, Mars and his band sung the record on, the German show, "Sat 1 Frühstücksfernsehen" and on December 31, 2012, at the New Year Alan Carr's Specstacular. It was performed occasionally on The Moonshine Jungle Tour (2013–2014). The song was recorded by Mark Kozelek for his 2013 acoustic cover songs album Like Rats. It was also covered by Chris Jamison and Jonathan Wyndham during their Battle Round in the seventh season of The Voice and was made available for purchase on October 13, 2014.

== Personnel ==
Credits adapted from the liner notes of Unorthodox Jukebox and ASCAP.

- Bruno Mars – lead vocals, songwriting
- Philip Lawrence – songwriting
- Ari Levine – songwriting, recording
- Jeff Bhasker – production, songwriting
- Emile Haynie – production, songwriting
- Mac Davis – songwriting
- The Smeezingtons – production
- Charles Moniz – additional engineer
- Brent Kolatalo – big drums engineer
- Ken Lewis – big drums engineer
- Manny Marroquin – mixing
- David Kutch – mastering

== Charts ==
=== Weekly charts ===
List of chart positions
Chart (2012–14)	Peak position
Australia (ARIA)	62
Canada Hot 100 (Billboard)	19
Canada AC (Billboard)	7
Canada CHR/Top 40 (Billboard)	17
Canada Hot AC (Billboard)	12
Finland Airplay (Radiosoittolista)	63
France (SNEP)	123
Ireland (IRMA)	78
Japan Hot 100 (Billboard)	72
Netherlands (Dutch Tipparade)	18
New Zealand (Recorded Music NZ)	23
South Korea International Singles (Gaon)	1
UK Singles (Official Charts)	83
US Billboard Hot 100	32
US Adult Contemporary (Billboard)	17
US Adult Pop Airplay (Billboard)	13
US Pop Airplay (Billboard)	9
US Rhythmic Airplay (Billboard)	19

=== Year-end charts ===
List of chart position
Chart (2014)	Position
Canada (Canadian Hot 100)	71

== Certifications ==
List of certifications
Region	Certification	Certified units/sales
Australia (ARIA)	Gold	35,000^{^}
Canada (Music Canada)	2× Platinum	160,000^{‡}
New Zealand (RMNZ)	Platinum	30,000^{‡}
United Kingdom (BPI)	Silver	200,000^{‡}
United States (RIAA)	Platinum	1,000,000^{‡}
^{^} Shipments figures based on certification alone.^{‡} Sales+streaming figures based on certification alone.

== Release history ==
=== Promotional release ===
List of promotional release history, showing region, date, format and label
Region	Date	Format	Label	Ref.
Various	November 6, 2012	Digital download (iTunes countdown single)	Unknown	

=== Single release ===
List of release history, showing region(s), date(s), format(s) and label(s)
Region	Date	Format	Label	Ref.
Australia	November 26, 2013	Unknown	Unknown	
United States	December 10, 2013	Contemporary hit radio	Atlantic	
United Kingdom	February 17, 2014	Contemporary hit radio	Atlantic	
Italy	February 26, 2014	Radio airplay	Unknown	
