= Gorilla (song) =

2013 single by Bruno Mars

Single by Bruno Mars

from the album Unorthodox Jukebox
- Released: September 10, 2013
- Studio: Levcon (Los Angeles, California); Avatar (New York, New York)
- Genre: Arena rock; rock; soft rock; pop rock
- Length: 4:04
- Label: Atlantic
- Songwriters: Bruno Mars; Philip Lawrence; Ari Levine
- Producers: The Smeezingtons; Jeff Bhasker; Emile Haynie; Mark Ronson

Bruno Mars singles chronology
"Bubble Butt" (2013)	"Gorilla" (2013)	"Young Girls" (2013)

Music video
- "Gorilla" on YouTube

"Gorilla" is a song by American singer-songwriter Bruno Mars from his second studio album Unorthodox Jukebox (2012). The song was written by Mars, Philip Lawrence, and Ari Levine, who produced the song under the name of the Smeezingtons, with Emile Haynie, Jeff Bhasker and Mark Ronson. Atlantic Records serviced the track to Contemporary hit radio in the United States on September 10, 2013, as the fourth single from Unorthodox Jukebox. Its official remix (G-Mix) features American singers Pharrell Williams and R. Kelly, and was released in Canada and US on November 12. "Gorilla" is a midtempo arena-rock, rock and soft rock song with a power pop hook, "epic" guitars and a Phil Collins-esque synth/percussion. Its style has drawn comparisons to Prince's 1984 single "Purple Rain".

The single received mixed reviews from critics, who praised its resemblance to early 1980s arena rock, but criticized its explicit lyrical content, which addresses the subject of making love like wild animals. The song reached number 22 on the US Billboard Hot 100 and number 62 on the UK Singles Chart, being unable to achieve the same success of the previous singles. It was certified platinum by the Recording Industry Association of America (RIAA) and by Music Canada (MC). Mars performed "Gorilla" live at the 2013 MTV Video Music Awards and at the 2013 MTV Europe Music Awards. The song was included on the set list of his second world tour, The Moonshine Jungle Tour (2013–14) as the final act, usually performed as an encore and was performed in some shows of the 24K Magic World Tour (2017–18) and Bruno Mars Live (2022-24).

== Background ==
"Gorilla" was the first song written for the album, setting "the tone for the entire project and it kind of became the mascot". This was the reason behind the gorilla on the cover of the album, as Bruno Mars explained in an interview with MTV News. In another interview, this time for GQ, Mars revealed the song's conception, saying that "it was just painting a picture—some animalistic sex". When asked about what the meaning is for "making love like a gorilla", Mars replied aggressively "What does that sound like to you? Come on...What is this, 1933? We can't talk about this?". Regarding the line "I got a body full of liquor with a cocaine kicker", Mars said that his inspiration came "just because the room was dark" and he felt like Johnny Cash.

On the same interview, he was asked if his perfect idea of encounter was the same as described in the track, one in which your partner is screaming to you, "Give it to me, baby, give it to me, motherfucker" and having attracted the attention of the cops due to the violent noises you are making with your partner outside while "trying to get in". To this question Mars said "It definitely sounds awesome. Right? Isn't that what matters? It's an awesome song! I don't know how to tell you that more". In another interview, this time for Rolling Stone, he explained that the track is about "good old animalistic sex". When the interviewer asked if Mars was concerned with the verses "Got a body full of liquor with a cocaine kicker" due to his 2010 drug bust, he replied "To take that line out would dilute my art", since the recording "needs a sense of danger. When I was a kid, pop could be dangerous but still massive. Michael Jackson would grab his crotch. Prince would rock assless chaps".

A demo of the song, only featuring the vocals and an acoustic guitar, was exclusively released as a bonus track on the Target edition of the album, on December 11, 2012. Almost a year later, on November 5, 2013, the demo of the song was also included on the deluxe edition of the album, released in various countries. Upon the release of the remix of the song (G-Mix), on November 12, 2013, Mars commented that it featured "two of [his] favorite artist[s]", Pharrell Williams and R. Kelly.

== Production and release ==
"Gorilla" was written by Mars, Philip Lawrence and Ari Levine, and produced by the Smeezingtons, Mark Ronson, Jeff Bhasker and Emile Haynie. The same producers have contributed to Mars 2012 single "Locked Out of Heaven" for his second album Unorthodox Jukebox. "Gorilla" was recorded at Levcon Studios in Los Angeles, California and Avatar Studios in New York City, New York by Levine, ALALAL and Ronson, the latter two assisted by Bob Mallory and Tyler Hartman. The track's engineering was additionally provided by Charles Moniz. "Gorilla" was mixed by Manny Marroquin at Larrabee Sound Studios in North Hollywood. Steve Jordan played the drums, while Sharrod Barnes was responsible for the guitar and Bhasker handled the keyboards. Ronson was the performer of beats and Artie Smith was the technician of gear and served as a performer of vibes. It was mastered by David Kutch at The Mastering Place.

On August 25, 2013 at the 2013 MTV Video Music Awards, Mars unveiled the fourth single taken from Unorthodox Jukebox, "Gorilla" during the performance of the same. On September 10, Atlantic Records serviced "Gorilla" to Contemporary hit radio stations in the United States. It also impacted US Rhythmic contemporary radios on September 17. On September 24, "Gorilla" was sent for radio airplay in Italy by Warner. BBC Radio 1Xtra began adding the song onto their playlists on October 21. Later, on November 12, the official remix of the song was made available for purchase in the United States and Canada. It features American singers Pharrell Williams and R. Kelly. In both countries, two versions were made available; a clean and an explicit one being released in the same day in both countries. Capital FM radio considered the single artwork one of the best of 2013.

== Composition and lyrical interpretation ==
"Gorilla"
A 22-second sample of "Gorilla", where Mars sings the chorus with jungle noises in the background.

"Gorilla" is an arena-rock, soft rock, pop rock, and rock song. The track opens with a stark, insinuating beat and Mars's bleating vocals. As it progresses, monstrous drums burst. A guitar, a piano, keyboards and a backbeat are also part of the instrumentation. The song features jungle noises in the background along with a pop hook. According to the digital sheet music, the song was composed in common time and in the key of B minor with a tempo of 70 beats per minute. Mars's vocals range spans from the low note of B3 to the high note of A5.

Billboard's magazine reviewer, Jason Lipshutz, called the track "an ambitious...sex jam". It is often noted that "Gorilla" is a song rich of instruments that create a 1980s sound similar to Prince's, with the keyboards overwhelming the instrumental backbeat. On the song, Mars performs multiple high-range falsettos. Matt Dihel for Rolling Stone said that the recording features a "thundering, Def Leppard-huge thump and risqué subject matter".

The song has gained attention due to its explicit lyrics. The song begins with the lyrics "I got a body full of liquor and a cocaine kicker", during the song "a slew of f-bombs" can be heard, and varied graphic descriptions such as: "You got your legs up in the sky with the devil in your eyes / Let me hear you say you want it all" and the chorus "You and me, baby, making love like gorillas!". Overall, the lyrics portray the subject of having a "romantic evening" of making love like wild animals (gorillas), despite being high from cocaine and drunk from liquor. On September 11, 2013, The Daily Telegraph reported that Dannielle Miller, co-founder of Enlighten Education, decided to appeal to mainstream radio in order to ban "Gorilla", due to its sexual and violent lyrics towards women.

== Critical reception ==
"Gorilla" received mixed reviews by most music critics. Some of them praised its musical structure, while others complained for its lack of lyrical depth. In a review of Unorthodox Jukebox, Slant Magazine's Andrew Chan wrote that it is the album's highlight being the most energetic track on the album and found it "most infectious bedroom anthem of the year." Likewise, Lauren Kreisler from the Official Charts Company, described the song as an apparent bedroom antics. Kreisler found that the lyrics' concept simply "baffled" anyone, while ultimately described the song as "intriguing (and anthemic) enough to make us listen again, and again, and again, to work it out." About.com critic Bill Lamb rated the song 3 out of 5 stars, praising the musicality, since the singer recaptures "the musical spirit of Prince's arena sized ballad "Purple Rain" and "the pounding keyboards and crunchy guitar will invite a live audience to sway along in time to the music". On the other hand, the "erotic connection" is misguided because "the words about alcohol and cocaine fueled rough sex, it is difficult to see the song as truly erotic", making the lyrics "tasteless" and lacking concept.

Writing for The Washington Post, Allison Stewart opined that the track describes an eccentric night of romance, beginning with "a body full of liquor with a cocaine kicker" and ending with "you and me/Making love like gorillas". She concluded, "for all its awfulness" the song is the "image shifter Mars needs". Idolator's Emily Tan commented "the libidinous lyrics are disguised with epic guitars and Phil Collins-esque heavy drum combinations...strong enough to soundtrack a scene in a drama series". Jason Lipshutz of Billboard magazine similarly felt that the "drums and keyboards are nicely overwhelming, but the overall concept floats too far away to make a dent on the listener". Day Hyman of Spin thought that the lyrics on the album "desperately needed kick in the pants" mainly noticed on "Gorilla". He also drew comparisons on the "Prince-channeling" vibe. On the critical side, Amy Dawson of Metro described it as a "Phil Collins-esque low point" in the album, "the singer makes plans to go at it in the same way as said giant ape...by the time the jungle noises kick in, you think he surely must be in on the joke."

Kory Grow of Rolling Stone's magazine reviewed the remix of the song, in the song "Pharrell opens the track with a salacious rap", setting "the thematic pace for track", in the end of his verse the original "steamy" verses of Mars begin. He further added that R. Kelly makes the song a "sex jam" and only him has "the hubris and swagger to shout": "I'm like an anaconda in your garden/Baby girl, I'm explorin'". Reviewing for Billboard's column, Kevin Rutherford described the track as "raunchy" and if the original version was "dirty enough", then "Mars and company have a treat in store for you". The Los Angeles Times's Mikael Wood shared a similar opinion as the other reviewers, calling it a "little naughtier" than the original version thanks to Williams and Kelly. For Idolator, Mike Wass called the remix "X-rated", thanking the feature guests for that.

== Commercial performance ==
In the week ending of August 25, 2013, after the performance on the VMAs, the song was downloaded 20,000 times, a jump of 1,003% from the previous week when it sold 2,000 copies. In the following week, the song debuted at number 60 on the US Billboard Hot 100, selling 55,000 to 60,000 copies, as most of the songs performed at the show were still earning from the performances, including "Gorilla". The song eventually peaked at number 22 on the Billboard Hot 100. On the Mainstream Top 40 chart, the single debuted at number 30 and reached its peak at number 11. The song ended two top 10 streaks, one on the Billboard Hot 100 and the other at the Pop Songs chart and it was certified platinum by the Recording Industry Association of America (RIAA). "Gorilla" reached the high position of 23, on November 2, 2013, on the Canadian Hot 100 chart. The song has been certified platinum by Music Canada (MC).

In the United Kingdom, it debuted at number 97 on the Singles Chart. On the week of November 23, 2013 the song peaked at number 62, becoming his first single in the country to miss the Top 40. It also made appearances in the Republic of Ireland debuting and peaking at number 53. Its highest chart position in European countries was in Netherlands, where it reached a peak of 31. The track was able to chart in the Belgium region, on their respective Tipparade, Ultratip Flanders reaching the peak of 11 and in the Ultratip Wallonia sitting at number 9. After its release as a single, "Gorilla" entered the Australian Singles Chart at number 68 and peaked at number 41 on September 29, 2013. It was certified gold by the Australian Recording Industry Association (ARIA).

== Music video ==
=== Background and concept ===
"He's the hardest-working person I’ve ever worked with or met. He pays attention to everything; he's the one who came up with the basic idea for this video. We'd have conversations about it, he'd call me at 2 a.m. and be like ’We gotta do this’ or ’We need to add that.’"

— Cameron Duddy explaining the development of the music video.

Mars had been filming the music video for "Gorilla" as he announced on his Twitter account, on October 2, 2013. He said "Sorry i've been M.I.A, I was shooting a music video. #WinkWink #FRIKIKIKIKI #BangBang Wait till you see this". It was directed by Mars and regular collaborator Cameron Duddy. On October 10, 2013 it was announced on Bruno Mars's official website, leading up to the release of the video, the unveil of teasers every day via his Instagram account. The teasers included a car parked in front of a strip club, a reptile, and an angry boss played by Luis Guzmán. Duddy along with Mars sought to create "more than a standard strip-club video" by researching and going into strip clubs to appreciate the architecture of the local. Nevertheless, the search for the ideal strip club was fruitless, so Mars and Duddy decided to build one: "a joint that seemed like it was lifted straight out of Havana, dark and sweaty and seemingly untouched by time." They painted the walls themselves, and went back and forth on just what color neon they should use".

When the time came to cast someone to play a stripper, the only name was Freida Pinto. However, Duddy had some doubts her choice, since he considered her "safe". To this, Mars replied "it's important to use someone who hasn't been seen in this light before". Duddy confessed that he trusted Mars instincts regarding Pinto's choice for the role. Duddy explained that some scenes recorded for the video were dangerous. Pinto could have harmed herself in the scene where "she sheds her clothes among a sea of sparks", as well as Mars's guitar player "He got dangerously close to having his head burned". Muriel Villera starts as one of the jealous strippers. The music video was set to premiere on October 14, 2013. Nevertheless, its release was delayed one day by Mars himself stating "I want it to be the best it can be. With that being said, I need one more day". The video, arrived on October 15, 2013 exclusively on Facebook.

=== Synopsis ===
MTV described it as a "gloriously cinematic scene", Isabella (Pinto) strips down to just underwear, "literally causing the joint to short circuit".

The music video opens with a pair of jealous strippers applying lipstick and caddying back-and-forth between backstage, in a South of the Border strip zoo named "La Jungla". As Mars's "Money Make Her Smile" can be heard from the room, the two of them are talking about a new girl who has been "fooling around" with someone else's man (Mars). The scene ends with one of the two women saying, "Wait 'til I tell the boss who she's sleeping with". It is shown that the new girl, Isabella, has been listening to the conversation and it's her time to dance as soon as the boss says so. The role of Isabella is portrayed by Indian actress Pinto, who after an introduction by Guzmán, the owner, starts to pull off "gravity-defying spins on the pole" as Mars and his mates, who serve as the house band, perform the song. On the following scene, Isabella sheds her clothes with such rage that sparks fall from the ceiling while Mars stares at her, intensely singing, "You and me baby making love like gorillas". As the second verse starts, intermittent shots of Mars and Isabella "heating up the backseat of a car" are intercut along with shots of her "grinding on customers" and banging on Mars's chest as he sings the line "Bang bang, gorilla"; the former shots are shown throughout the video. As the video continues, Isabella is shown "to drop on her knees and lick" Mars's guitar. She grabs it and pours tequila over the same, before using a lighter to set it on fire. Afterwards, the roof sprinklers come on and Isabella lets the water shower her while she stands in her underwear. The video ends in a chase scene in which Mars runs down through a dimly lit aisle, and suddenly transforms into a giant gorilla, while Isabella is seen at the end of the pathway waiting for him. The video doesn't contain any of the teasers Mars released days before the video: the iguana shot, the outer car scene and one with Guzman listening to the intro for Isabella.

=== Reception ===
Upon its release, the video received positive response from critics. James Montgomery of MTV News said that the video "is undoubtedly indebted to the past few decades of pop-cultural history...yet, once again, he's managed to create something entirely new, too". He added that, "thanks to Pinto's wattage, "Gorilla" goes to heights – and depths – Mars has never visited before". Billboard's Jason Lipshutz found Mars supporting "a more R-rated side" in the video, calling the cameos by Pinto and Luis Guzman unforgettable. Carl Williot of the website's Idolator thought that the new video maintained the "sweaty nightclub vibe" style from the previous video "Locked Out of Heaven". Additionally, she felt there is a story centered on Isabella, the new dancer, and Mars, which obviously upset "the club's veteran strippers". The Times of India newspaper considered the video one of the most controversial of 2013 because of "Pinto strip act". Ray Rahman of Entertainment Weekly opined that "Bruno Mars is getting real" since the video was set on a strip club and featured Pinto stripping, licking guitars and getting intimate with Mars. Lauren Kreisler of Official Charts Company praised the video concept and concluded that it was "racy as you might have expected". The video for "Gorilla" broke the 1 million views mark in just over an hour in 2013 on the exclusive Facebook program premiere, "#NowPlaying".

== Live performances and reception ==
Mars performed the song, aside from the tour, at the 2013 MTV Video Music Awards (VMA's) and 2013 MTV Europe Music Awards (EMA's). On the latter, he recreated his provocative music video with Nicole "The Pole" Williams. During these performances there was a green color scheme with a neon sign pulsating in the background with the same color. At the 2013 MTV VMA's, Mars was standing high up on a platform, while wearing a "leopard-print button-down". Whilst there was a screen with a giant gorilla face behind him and lasers firing through the stage. He kicked his mic stand over and over, while his band was jamming along. Meanwhile, some pyrotechnics "shooting off at the climax" and "blasts of fire erupted during the chorus". At the 2013 MTV EMA's, Mars had a similar style too Lou Reed and aviator sunglasses. On this performance, his face was "superimposed" over Williams dancing around a stripper pole with "acrobatic ease" and "breathtaking moves in time to the song". During the bridge of the song, the singer played a guitar solo while Williams stand in the crab position thrusting her hips towards Mars's guitar in the same tempo. The song was the final act on both set lists of The Moonshine Jungle Tour (2013–2015). It was also performed in selected shows of not only Bruno Mars at The Chelsea, Las Vegas (2013–2015), but also during the 24K Magic World Tour (2017–2018). During the Bruno Mars Live (2022-2024) and starting on October 4, 2024, "Calling All My Lovelies" (2016) was added to the set list along with samples of "Gorilla" and "Wake Up in the Sky" (2018).

Regarding the 2013 MTV Video Music Awards performance, Billboard's Brad Wete said: "There's something to be said about simplicity when whatever’s simply being done is awesome. Bruno Mars never moved more than three steps in any direction during his performance. His voice soared and his passion was palpable as he performed". He concluded, "when his time came, Mars left his mark". Mathew Jacobs of The Huffington Post believes that "Gorilla" "marked one of the night's tamer moments". He praised Mars performance by saying he "offered a brand of artistry unmatched by the bulk of the telecast." Grading the performances of the show, the staff from Entertainment Weekly gave Mars's performance an A−, describing it as "The most elegantly designed and executed performance of the evening". MTV News' Brenna Ehrlich classified the 2013 MTV Europe Music Awards performance as a "show that rivaled anything you'd find in the city's famous – and infamous – Red Light District". The UK edition of The Huffington Post commented that despite Mars's voice being on top form, it was the pole-dancer performance who stole the show. Other performers, such as Ed Sheeran and Adam Lambert praised the interpretation by calling it an amazing performance and noticing Mars's vocals, respectively. Hilary Duff called "Gorilla" "straight baby making music". Writing for Billboard magazine, Jason Lipshutz, while reviewing the tour felt that Gorilla was "an odd selection for a set closer". He further added, that Mars "lost his mind while perched upon an elevated platform with pyrotechnics blasting off behind him".

== Track listing ==
Digital download
No.	Title	Length
1.	"Gorilla" (featuring R. Kelly and Pharrell) (G-Mix)	4:25

== Personnel ==
Credits adapted from the liner notes of Unorthodox Jukebox.

- Bruno Mars – lead vocals, songwriting
- Philip Lawrence – songwriting
- Ari Levine – songwriting, recording
- The Smeezingtons – production
- Mark Ronson – production, recording, beats performer
- Jeff Bhasker – production, keyboards
- Emile Haynie – production
- Steve Jordan – drums
- Sharrod Barnes – guitar
- Artie Smith – gear technician, vibes performer
- ALALAL – recording
- Bob Mallory – recording assistant
- Tyler Hartman – recording assistant
- Charles Moniz – additional engineer
- Manny Marroquin – mixing
- David Kutch – mastering

== Charts ==
=== Weekly charts ===
List of chart positions
Chart (2013)	Peak position
Australia (ARIA)	41
Austria (Ö3 Austria Top 40)	74
Belgium (Ultratip Bubbling Under Flanders)	11
Belgium (Ultratip Bubbling Under Wallonia)	9
Canada Hot 100 (Billboard)	23
Canada CHR/Top 40 (Billboard)	12
Canada Hot AC (Billboard)	18
France (SNEP)	117
Ireland (IRMA)	53
Lebanon (The Official Lebanese Top 20)	20
Mexico (Billboard Ingles Airplay)	26
Netherlands (Dutch Top 40)	31
Netherlands (Single Top 100)	54
Slovakia Airplay (ČNS IFPI)	65
UK Singles (Official Charts)	62
US Billboard Hot 100	22
US Adult Pop Airplay (Billboard)	23
US Pop Airplay (Billboard)	11
US Rhythmic Airplay (Billboard)	9

=== Year-end charts ===
List of chart position
Chart (2013)	Position
Netherlands (Dutch Top 40)	193

== Certifications ==
List of certifications
Region	Certification	Certified units/sales
Australia (ARIA)	Gold	35,000^{^}
Canada (Music Canada)	Platinum	80,000^{‡}
New Zealand (RMNZ)	Gold	15,000^{‡}
United Kingdom (BPI)	Silver	200,000^{‡}
United States (RIAA)	Platinum	1,000,000^{‡}
^{^} Shipments figures based on certification alone.^{‡} Sales+streaming figures based on certification alone.

== Release history ==
List of release history, showing region(s), date(s), format(s), version(s) and label(s)
Region	Date	Format	Versions	Label	Ref.
United States	September 10, 2013	Contemporary hit radio	Original	Atlantic	
United States	September 17, 2013	Rhythmic contemporary	Original	Atlantic	
Italy	September 24, 2013	Radio airplay	Original	Warner Music Group	
United States	November 12, 2013	Digital download	G-Mix	Atlantic	
Canada	November 12, 2013	Digital download	G-Mix	Warner Music Group	
