= All I Ask =

2015 song by Adele

Song by Adele

from the album 25
- Released: 20 November 2015
- Studio: Glenwood Recording Studios, Burbank, California
- Genre: Pop
- Length: 4:31
- Label: XL
- Songwriters: Adele Adkins; Bruno Mars; Philip Lawrence; Christopher Brody Brown
- Producer: The Smeezingtons

"All I Ask" is a song by English singer-songwriter Adele for her third studio album 25 (2015). The song was written by Adele, Bruno Mars, Philip Lawrence and Christopher Brody Brown, with production by The Smeezingtons. Backed by a piano, the pop torch ballad describes the singer looking for one last night with her partner, before the couple separate.

"All I Ask" received unanimous acclaim from the music critics, with praise for its lyrics, production, and Adele's vocal performance. The track peaked at number 41 on the UK Singles Chart and at number 77 on the US Billboard Hot 100. It also charted at numbers 10, 21, 66, and 65 in South Korea, Finland, France, and Australia, respectively. It was certified platinum by Music Canada (MC) and the British Phonographic Industry (BPI). Adele performed it during several shows, including The Ellen DeGeneres Show and the 58th Annual Grammy Awards, both in February 2016. It was performed on selected dates during her Adele Live 2016 tour.

== Background and production ==
Though Bruno Mars had a "big, diva, ballad thing" in mind, he and Adele began conducting sessions for her third studio album, 25 (2015), initially attempting to create an uptempo song. When the duo began writing, Adele kept saying, "I don't want to do this, I don't like that", until they played a few chords that she liked and "All I Ask" was created. According to Mars, like a scene from the 1993 film Jurassic Park, Adele made water vibrate while recording the song in a studio booth. On a similar note, according to the song's engineer, Charles Moniz, Adele's vocals caused an assistant to drop a cup of tea during the recording, saying that "he thought it was done and she belted out a note". Adele considers the vocals on "All I Ask" her most "showoff-y". Adele and Mars disagreed over the lyric, "Take me by the hand while we do what lovers do", but Mars later changed his mind and said that "lovers" is "this grand word that makes the song bigger because no one says it. Because nobody talks like that, it pops out". They completed the song in two sessions. Adele has remarked, "[C]an you imagine the fun me and Bruno had making that?"

"All I Ask" was written by Adkins, Mars, Philip Lawrence and Christopher Brody Brown, with production by the Smeezingtons. Brown and Greg Phillinganes played the piano, while Moniz, with engineering assistant Jacob Dennis, engineered the track. Tom Elmhirst mixed "All I Ask" at Electric Lady Studios in Greenwich Village, with Joe Visciano serving as the mix assistant. It was mastered by Tom Coyne and Randy Merrill, with Ryan Smith mastering the vinyl version.

== Composition ==
"All I Ask"
A 27-second sample of "All I Ask"'s chorus, which strips back the instrumentation to piano only, and sets Adele "gusting over the octaves".

Inspired by American singer-songwriter Billy Joel, piano is the song's only instrumentation. It is a sentimental love ballad which discusses the theme of melancholia, making use of "tidy, fast piano patterns". The singer asks her lover to spend a final night with her before they part ways. She processes the end of the relationship "in what feels like slow motion" according to Rolling Stone's Jon Dolan. "All I Ask" is written in the key of E Major (and changes to F major at the third chorus) with a tempo of 71 beats per minute in common time, and follows a chord progression of E–G♯m–Asus2–B in the verses with her vocals spanning from E_{3} to D_{5}. Paste's Holly Gleason described "All I Ask" as a "'last time we make love' song", adding that it is "pure torch" and serves as an invitation to progress beyond, but "stay in the moment and enjoy it completely" for a while.

Neil McCormick of The Telegraph described the song as a "deep, resonant piano ballad". Mic's Liz Rowley wrote that the song leaves the listener with "a solid sense of accepting love lost, and clears up the dreadful finality that resignation brings with it" adding that it "arrives at an emotional plane that's devastating yet utterly relatable". Tom Breihan of Stereogum called "All I Ask" a "weeper" and likened it to the work of American singer Barbra Streisand. Writing for Entertainment Weekly, Leah Greenblatt described the song as a "palatial piano ballad" and as a "classic vehicle soaked in stately production and minor-key melancholy".

== Critical reception ==
"All I Ask" received widespread acclaim from the music critics. Sarah Rodman of The Boston Globe called it a "whopper of an 11 o'clock number" that transitions from "plaintive" to "soaring". Writing for PopMatters, Chris Gerard called the song a "showstopping highlight" and a "gorgeous ballad", describing Adele's vocal performance as "absolutely thrilling", but noted that it "[has] a little of that sappiness that often infects love ballads". The New York Times' Jon Caramanica listed "All I Ask" as the fifth best song of 2015. In a rave review, he observed a palpable gear shift and called the song a "masterpiece", adding that it is "even bigger than the legend". Natalie Finn of E! felt its lyric, "It matters how this ends / cause what if I never love again?", was the most emotional on 25.

Vanity Fair's Josh Duboff opined that a listener was most likely to sing "All I Ask" "in [their] shower again and again". Christina Garibaldi of MTV called it a "song of desperation", adding that it is "so emotional" that the listener can "feel Adele's heart break into a million pieces". Writing for Entertainment Weekly, Leah Greenblatt felt the song was a "classic ... soaked in stately production and minor-key melancholy" that affirmed Adele is not the same as on her previous album "pouring out the pain of her pulverized heart", but someone who can connect with "tender emotions". In May 2018, Chuck Arnold ranked the song as Adele's eighth best for Billboard, calling it a "killer ballad" saying Adele is a "vocal beast all over it".

== Chart performance ==
Following the release of 25, "All I Ask" debuted at its peak of number 66 on the French Singles Chart. It also debuted at number 60 on the Scottish Singles Chart and at number 77 on the Billboard Hot 100. Following her Carpool Karaoke performance in January 2016, the song entered at number 65 on the Australian Singles Chart, number 21 on the Finnish Download Chart, number 93 on the Irish Singles Chart and number 41 on the UK Singles Chart. It subsequently rose to a new peak on the Scottish Singles Chart, reaching number 12. On Canadian Digital Songs, "All I Ask" managed to reach number 34 in March 2016. The song peaked at number eight on the Netherlands Digital Songs chart. On Sweden Digital Songs, it reached number nine. "All I Ask" subsequently reached number five on the UK Indie Songs chart issue dated 22 January 2016. It was certified platinum by Music Canada (MC) and by the British Phonographic Industry (BPI). It has sold a total of 5,941 copies in South Korea.

== Live performances and cover ==
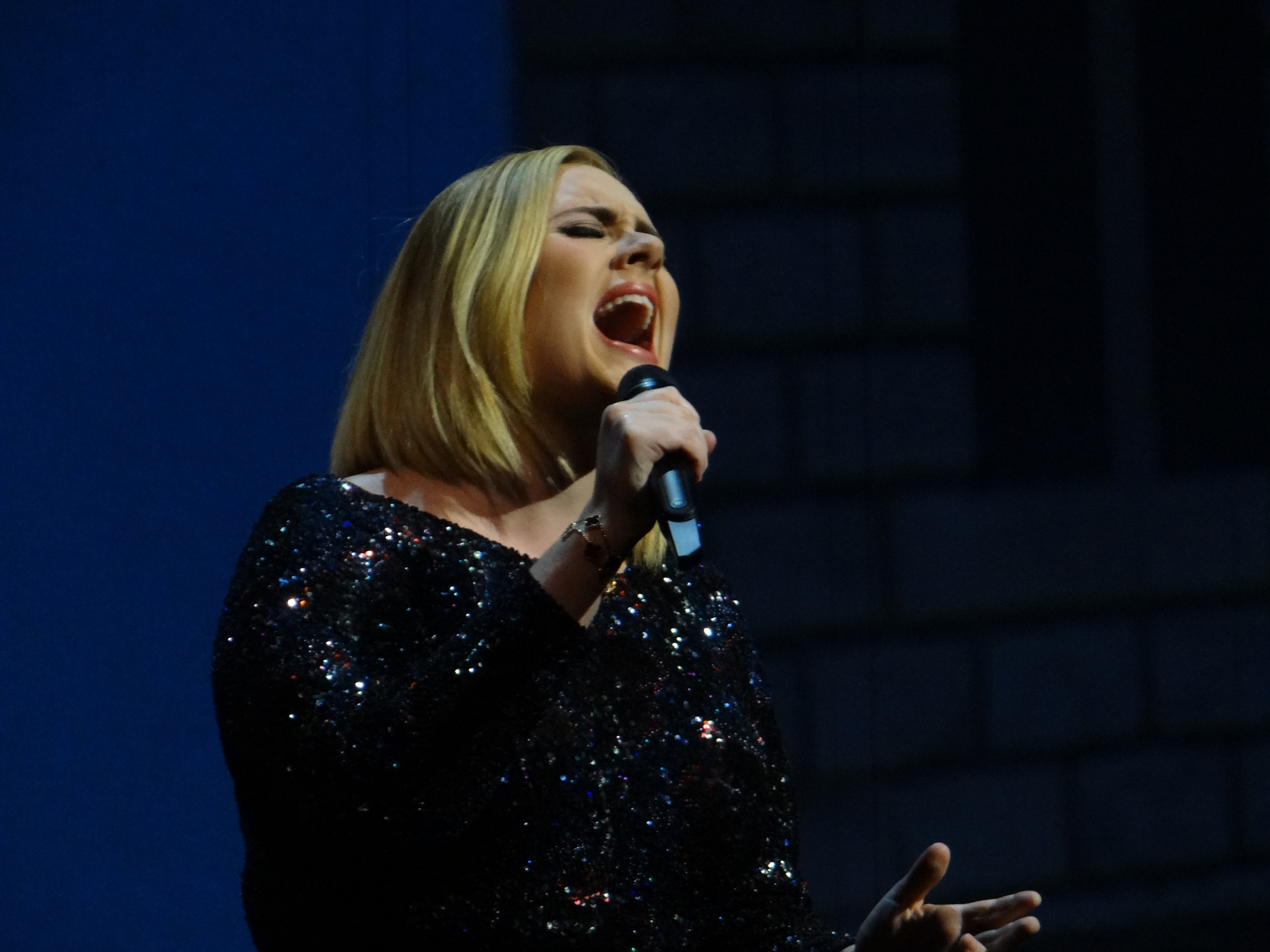
Adele singing at the Bridgestone Arena in Nashville, Tennessee during her Adele Live 2016 tour

Adele first performed the song on Adele Live in New York City, which was recorded at Radio City Music Hall on 17 November 2015 and broadcast on NBC on 14 December 2015. In a positive review, Lily Karlin of the Huffington Post referred to it as "honestly unreal" and a performance "for the ages". Elle's Alyssa Bailey described the performance as "breathtaking" and said the listener would be "blown away" by Adele's voice. During an episode of The Late Late Show with James Corden in January 2016, Adele included "All I Ask" on the Carpool Karaoke segment.

She performed the song at the 58th Annual Grammy Awards ceremony on 15 February 2016, experiencing technical issues with the sound caused by the piano microphones. In response to the incident, she posted an explanation on Twitter: "The piano mics fell on to the piano strings, that's what the guitar sound was. It made it sound out of tune". Neil Portnow, president of The Recording Academy, claimed responsibility for the problem, stating "that was all an issue on our behalf". Two days later, Adele performed "All I Ask" on The Ellen DeGeneres Show. This performance was well received. Rappler wrote that Adele "slay[ed]" the song on Ellen. Ella Ceron of Teen Vogue shared that opinion, writing that "she slays it, naturally", and adding that she performed the song with all the power and emotion "we've come to expect" from her. The Wall Street Journal's Sarene Leeds wrote that the singer "redeem[ed]" herself in the eyes of the public with the "stunning rendition".

Adele performed "All I Ask" on selected dates during her Adele Live 2016 tour. Bruno Mars and his band, the Hooligans, covered the song during the BBC Radio 1 Live Lounge on 2 November 2016. The latter performance was nominated for Best Cover Song at the 2017 iHeartRadio Music Awards.

== Credits and personnel ==
Credits adapted from the liner notes of 25

Locations

- Recorded at Glenwood Recording Studios, Burbank, California
- Mixed at Electric Lady Studios, Greenwich Village, New York

Personnel

- Adele – songwriting, lead vocals
- Bruno Mars – songwriting, production
- Philip Lawrence – songwriting, production
- Christopher Brody Brown – songwriting, piano
- Greg Phillinganes – piano
- The Smeezingtons – production
- Charles Moniz – engineering
- Jacob Dennis – engineering assistant
- Tom Elmhirst – mixing
- Joe Visciano – mixing assistant
- Tom Coyne – mastering
- Randy Merrill – mastering
- Ryan Smith – mastering vinyl

== Charts ==
Chart positions for "All I Ask"
Chart (2015–2021)	Peak position
Australia (ARIA)	65
Canada (Hot Canadian Digital Songs)	34
Finland Download (Latauslista)	21
France (SNEP)	66
Global 200 (Billboard)	110
Hong Kong (HKRIA)	30
Ireland (IRMA)	93
Netherlands Digital Songs (Billboard)	8
Scottish Singles Sales (Official Charts)	12
South Korea International Chart (Gaon)	10
Sweden Digital Songs (Billboard)	9
Sweden Heatseeker (Sverigetopplistan)	9
UK Singles (Official Charts)	41
UK Indie (Official Charts)	5
US Billboard Hot 100	77

== Certifications ==
Certifications for "All I Ask"
Region	Certification	Certified units/sales
Brazil (Pro-Música Brasil)	Gold	30,000^{‡}
Canada (Music Canada)	2× Platinum	160,000^{‡}
Denmark (IFPI Danmark)	Gold	45,000^{‡}
New Zealand (RMNZ)	2× Platinum	60,000^{‡}
Portugal (AFP)	Gold	10,000^{‡}
Spain (Promusicae)	Gold	30,000^{‡}
United Kingdom (BPI)	Platinum	600,000^{‡}
^{‡} Sales+streaming figures based on certification alone.
