= Unorthodox Jukebox =

2012 studio album by Bruno Mars

Studio album by Bruno Mars
- Released: December 7, 2012
- Studios: Avatar (New York City); Daptone (Brooklyn); Larrabee Sound (Los Angeles); Levcon (Hollywood)
- Genres: Pop; R&B; rock; funk; soul; reggae; disco
- Length: 34:51
- Label: Atlantic
- Producers: The Smeezingtons; Jeff Bhasker; Mark Ronson; Emile Haynie; Supa Dups

Bruno Mars chronology
Doo-Wops & Hooligans (2010)	Unorthodox Jukebox (2012)	24K Magic (2016)

Singles from Unorthodox Jukebox
- 1. "Locked Out of Heaven" Released: October 1, 2012; 2. "When I Was Your Man" Released: January 15, 2013; 3. "Treasure" Released: May 10, 2013; 4. "Gorilla" Released: September 10, 2013; 5. "Young Girls" Released: November 26, 2013

Unorthodox Jukebox is the second studio album by the American singer and songwriter Bruno Mars. It was released on December 7, 2012, by Atlantic Records and was made available to listen to in its entirety for a week before its release. It serves as the follow-up to Mars's debut record Doo-Wops & Hooligans (2010). Mars's writing and production team, the Smeezingtons, composed the whole record and worked with several past collaborators, Jeff Bhasker and Supa Dups, while enlisting new producers, such as Mark Ronson and Emile Haynie.

The album was initially planned to be more "energetic" than his previous work, but ended up presenting a wide range of styles such as R&B, pop, reggae, rock, disco, funk and soul music. Lyrically, Unorthodox Jukebox revolves around the theme of relationships, incorporating more explicit lyrics and subjects than his previous material. Critical response to Unorthodox Jukebox was generally favorable; many reviewers compared Mars's work to that of his previous album, while others deemed its lyrics shallow.

It debuted at number two on the US Billboard 200, with first week sales of 192,000 copies, and later topped the chart. The record also reached number one in Australia, Canada, Switzerland, and the United Kingdom. The album was certified six-times platinum by the Recording Industry Association of America (RIAA), eight times platinum by both the Recorded Music NZ (RMNZ) and Music Canada (MC), and diamond by Syndicat national de l'édition phonographique (SNEP). Unorthodox Jukebox was the fourth best-selling album in 2013 and it has since sold six million units globally as of 2016. In 2014, Unorthodox Jukebox won the Grammy Award for Best Pop Vocal Album at the 56th Grammy Awards and International Album of the Year at the Juno Awards.

Unorthodox Jukebox was supported by five singles, including two US Billboard Hot 100 number ones "Locked Out of Heaven" and "When I Was Your Man", which also experienced commercial acclaim in various countries, with the former also topping the Canadian Hot 100. Subsequently, three other singles ("Treasure", "Gorilla", and "Young Girls") were made available for consumption in 2013, with each one of them having major to moderate success in the United States. The album was further promoted through The Moonshine Jungle Tour (2013–2014), along with various television appearances.

== Background ==
=== Conception ===
After ending The Doo-Wops & Hooligans Tour, Bruno Mars implied that he was going to take some time creating and perfecting his second full-length album. He additionally confessed that, "It's going to come when it comes" since his production team, the Smeezingtons, felt that they rushed his debut album because of the release's deadline. "We just want it to be perfect", the singer added. Due to the numerous television shows and worldwide performances provided by Mars, he acknowledged that his second studio album needed to display his "raucously" dynamic appearances on stage.

Mars revealed to Billboard in September 2012 on a preview of his cover story that he recorded an album that represented his freedom. On his debut record, Doo-Wops & Hooligans, the singer reportedly had to change some things because of pressure from his label, something he was displeased with. He clarified that Unorthodox Jukebox was more of him and what he stands for, mainly because he didn't have to modify things. He elaborated, "If I'm changing things around because people might think it's a hard pill to swallow then I'm going to feel like a circus clown onstage, selling something fake". The variety of music styles presented on Unorthodox Jukebox resulted in his rejection from his label several times in the past; he also confessed that he had to face criticism by label presidents, who—according to him—expressed, "Your music sucks, you don't know who you are, your music is all over the place, and we don't know how to market this stuff. Pick a lane and come back to us". To these statements, the singer added that he felt "disgusted" as he wanted to have the liberty to create his own music and not the music he was told to do.

Mars said that by the time he started to develop his songwriting skills, he learned his "most valuable lesson", "Does it make you move? Make you dance? Whether the song is uptempo or a ballad", adding that "there has to be a heartbeat in back of it. There needs to be a pulse in the song". To American Songwriter, Philip Lawrence recalled sleepless nights during the record's process, as the team was trying to prove that the debut album "wasn't a fluke", which according to Lawrence is "the absolute wrong mind-set to be". He went on expressing that the first four or five months they worked on the record were fruitless, because "nothing would stick". When they decided to leave the studio and have a few drinks, they came to conclusion to relax and not put themselves under so much pressure; it resulted in "the ideas [starting] coming out again."

=== Recording ===
The first thing he said was, 'I want to sound exactly the opposite of what a Mark Ronson collaboration with Bruno Mars is supposed to sound like.' That won me over – then I found out what a phenomenal talent he is. This is the most progressive music I've worked on yet. It's going to open up the arteries and change the sound of music".

— Mark Ronson on working with Bruno Mars.

Recording took place at Larrabee Sound Studios in Los Angeles, Levcon Studios in Hollywood, Daptone Studios in Brooklyn, and Avatar Studios in New York City. Having worked with record producer and multi-instrumentalist Jeff Bhasker on Doo-Wops & Hooligans, Mars enlisted him and Mark Ronson as he wanted the record to incorporate live instrumentation, but to still be suitable for clubs; Bhasker particularly admitted that it sounded great on the radio. American disc jockey Diplo was able to further push the album from the "safety net" with something for the [strip] club on "Money Makes Her Smile"; Mars claimed that the DJ could make the club go "wild" due to the sounds on his computer.

The development of Unorthodox Jukebox started when Mars wanted to create something unforeseen with the follow-up of his debut album. He began not only by not allowing himself to "get boxed in to any one genre" during the recording sessions for the album, but also by showing the influences of several other music styles "by having the autonomy and luxury of walking into the studio and claim [he feels] like doing a hip-hop, R&B, soul or rock record". Due to the music variety, the singer refused to "pick a lane" for Unorthodox Jukebox. As Mars had a lot of time to create the album, something that didn't happen during his debut, he reportedly had the possibility to develop a musically outstanding product that displayed his music taste and completely revealed his artistry. Because he had been a composer of pop and radio-friendly songs for a long time, it ultimately influenced the style of his debut; however, he didn't have the chance to craft the "sounds and sonics" he wanted to. As a result, Mars hoped to "let loose" and discuss darker, more risqué subject matter, while drawing on the "danger" embraced by pop artists such as Michael Jackson and Prince.

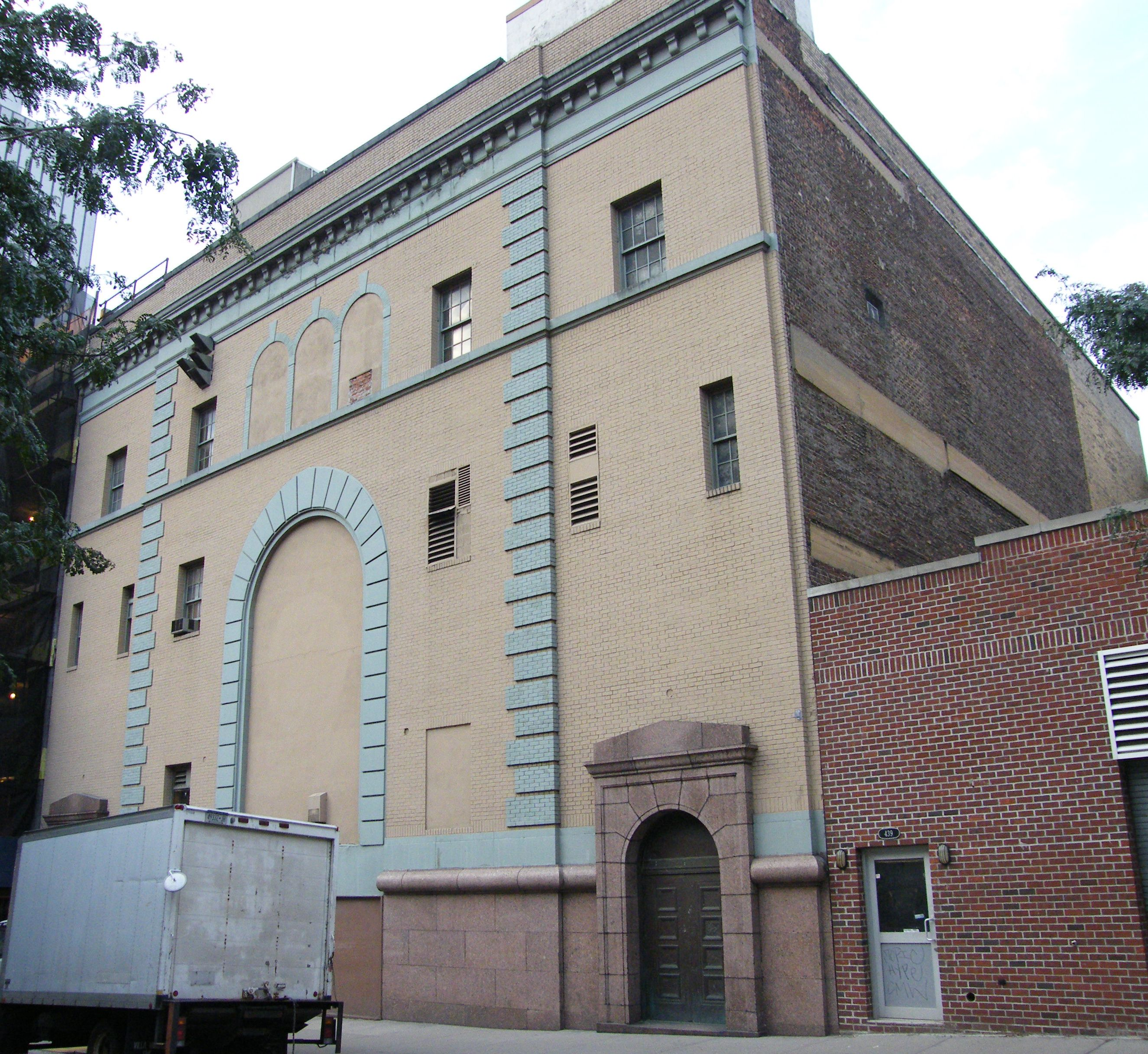
Avatar Studios in New York City, one of the four studios where the album was recorded.

To explore and create a new sound, Mars enlisted the help of Mark Ronson, Jeff Bhasker and Paul Epworth. The singer described this encounter as inviting "master chefs into the kitchen with no master plan" or any kind of outcome, "either a complete disaster or something outstanding". Previously, Benny Blanco, Emile Haynie, Diplo, Supa Dups, as well as Mars's production team the Smeezingtons, have been confirmed to have worked on the album. The first song written for Unorthodox Jukebox was "Gorilla", which "set the tone for the entire project"; Mars explained in an interview granted to MTV News that it became its mascot hence the reason it ended up as the album cover. In an interview for the Rolling Stone, Blanco confessed, "I got a really cool song with him. Me and Paul [Epworth] just got together and Bruno wrote an amazing song on top of it. It kind of all came together". He further explained that "it's like some throwback Nina Simone type shit, like 'Sinnerman'". Additionally, a "piano-laced" track was conceived for the album in its opening session.

Mars explained the meaning behind the album's title by saying that it had become a "soulful, experimental, electronic, hard-to-explain" concept. In order to record an album like that, it was—according to him—mandatory to experiment and not follow any known pattern, resulting the guests enlisted for the record to be unexpected. According to the singer, jazz artist Esperanza Spalding and Diplo were among them. Furthermore, the "pop's most innovative producers" (Bhasker, Haynie and Ronson) had to be taken "beyond their comfort zone". While being interviewed for his Billboard Artist of the Year cover story, Mars complimented Ronson and Bhasker by explaining that "it's not about what's hot on the radio or the fastest way to make a buck, these guys are fearless, doing the music they want to do". Mars additionally felt that "when there are no safe bets, that's when [he feels his] blood move."

Mars also worked with Michael Leonhart on three songs for the album, including on an unreleased version of "Locked Out of Heaven". By the end of September 2012, the singer was reportedly "fine-tuning" the mixing of a track until 5 a.m. with Manny Marroquin, mainly because of his disappointment with "It Will Rain"'s final mix. Starting with mid-October, the Smeezingtons were making the final touches on the album at Levcon Studios (their studio); Ari Levine sent a few tracks over e-mail with their final mixes to Mars, who was still in Manhattan after hosting Saturday Night Live.

== Composition ==
Unorthodox Jukebox is a pop, R&B, rock, funk, soul, reggae and disco record. The album opens with "Young Girls", a midtempo pop ballad which deals with the idea of indulging in the dubious charms of young girls, even though the singer recognizes that what he is doing is wrong. The song was re-registered in ASCAP with a new writing credit by Mac Davis. "Locked Out of Heaven", a reggae rock and pop rock track that incorporates elements of new wave and funk, is the subsequent track and the lead single. Musically, it contains booming synthesizers, a four-on-the-floor chorus, while lyrically exploring themes of love. Comparisons were established between "Locked Out of Heaven" and the rock/reggae style used by English band The Police. "Gorilla" was described by Mars as being about "good old animalistic sex". The track portrays a midtempo rock and soft rock song, while lyrically expressing male chauvinist sentiments and making reference to his 2010 arrest for cocaine possession. "Treasure", the album's third single, is a disco-pop song, inspired by English duo Wham! and "Baby I'm Yours" (2010) released by French disc jockey Breakbot. The latter similarities led the song to be re-registered with new writing credits, which included Thibaut Berland and Christopher Khan. "Moonshine", the second promotional single from the record, portrays a recording with ample influences of disco, power pop and quiet storm, while being compared to the work done by French electronic duo Daft Punk. Particularly, Chris Martins of Spin wrote that the song "channels the King of Pop, Michael Jackson with a markedly more reverent aplomb.

The song "When I Was Your Man" is a pop piano ballad and shows traditional notions of romance, a pre-fame heartbreak as Mars regrets letting his woman get away. Melinda Newman of HitFix thought the track "sounds like a cross between Stevie Wonder and Elton John," also seeing "a touch of Michael Jackson" in his delivery. Andy Gill of The Independent called it a "McCartney-esque piano ballad", while Jason Lipshut of Billboard wrote that "it will make for a killer lighters-in-the-air moment in concert. Although it's not quite an Alicia Keys-esque powerhouse, [it] smartly allows Mars to momentarily remove his fedora and bare his soul". The single was additionally likened to the material of Wham!. With "Natalie", Mars exhibits further male chauvinist sentiments over a girl named Natalie who stole Mars's money and ran away with it; the singer is therefore plotting murderous revenge against her. The song was described as "a sort of methed-up "Dirty Diana", assembled with fierce handclaps and hard-edged oooh-oooh vocal echos". Lipshutz called it the "flip-side of "When I Was Your Man" and pointed out Mars lamenting the hypnotism of a "gold-digging bitch". "Show Me" portrays a recording with ample influences of reggae and dancehall. These infusions are easily noticed by the "over sampled air horns", "tape-echo effects" and steel drums.

The ninth track from Unorthodox Jukebox, "Money Makes Her Smile", is the result of a trip to a strip club done by Mars and Diplo, who afterwards decided to create an "anthem" for it, since Mars's debut solo single was an awful song to be played in such place, according to him. The recording was described as a "strip-club-directed banger", infused with disco elements. Its composition includes "rapid-fire chants, breathless percussion, propulsive electronic blips" along with "rave sirens and hardcore punk rattle". Lyrically, the song describes a gold digger who can only be satisfied by "fat stacks of money". The album's final song of the standard edition, "If I Knew", is a Sam Cooke-inspired ballad which incorporates soul and doo-wop nuances. It lyrically delves on themes of regret. "Old & Crazy", a duet between Mars and Esperanza Spalding, was included on the deluxe version of Unorthodox Jukebox. Jeff Bhasker, one of the track's producers, confessed that the song is reminiscent of the sound of a 1920s Paris club. He went on explaining that its process began with Emile Haynie producing a beat and Bhasker adding a sample of a Django Reinhardt recording over it.

== Singles ==
"Locked Out of Heaven" was digitally unveiled and released for radio airplay on October 1, 2012, as the album's lead single. It received positive commentary from music critics, who praised its reggae, rock and funky beat, but also its lyrics for talking about passion in a "tidy and impeccable" way. Commercially, the recording was a success, peaking atop the US Billboard Hot 100 and claiming the position for six weeks, marking Mars's longest-running number-one on the chart after previously released "Just the Way You Are" (2010) and "Grenade" (2010) each topped the chart for four editions. The song further peaked at number one in Canada and on the US Pop Songs chart, while reaching the top ten in more than twenty countries.

"When I Was Your Man" was released on January 15, 2013, as the album's second single. It had previously been premiered as the album's third and final promotional single one month and a half prior to its stand-alone release. The track was critically acclaimed, receiving praising for being an "emotional ballad" and for featuring a "minimal musical accompaniment". The song topped the Billboard Hot 100 chart, becoming the singer's fifth number one single in the United States and it reached the top fifteen in several fellow territories. "When I Was Your Man" was nominated for Best Pop Solo Performance at the 56th Grammy Awards.

"Treasure" was subsequently confirmed as the record's third single by Atlantic Records. It received generally favorable reviews from critics, who praised it for "[echoing] the peppy sound of such pop/R&B hit-makers of the 1970s and 1980s as the Sylvers, Heatwave, DeBarge and Kool & the Gang." To promote the single, Mars performed on various occasions, including a "little extra Michael Jackson-esque, circa Off the Wall and Thriller" show at the 2013 Billboard Music Awards. Commercially, "Treasure" reached the top five in the United States and other eighteen countries.

"Gorilla", confirmed as the next single for Unorthodox Jukebox, was produced by the Smeezingtons, Mark Ronson, Jeff Bhasker and Emile Haynie, who previously handled the process for the record's lead single. The track impacted American pop radio on September 10, 2013, thus peaking at number 22 on the Billboard Hot 100 and becoming the singer's first single not to reach the top ten there. Mars performed the single for the first time during the 2013 MTV Video Music Awards.

"Young Girls" was released as the fifth and final single from the album. Mars announced its availability during an interview with Nova 96.9, an Australian radio station, on November 26, 2013. Commercially, its charting was influenced by its stand-alone release as the record's first promotional single on November 6, 2012, through iTunes Store. Unmaterialized plans for a music video to accompany "Young Girls" were made in 2012.

== Release and promotion ==
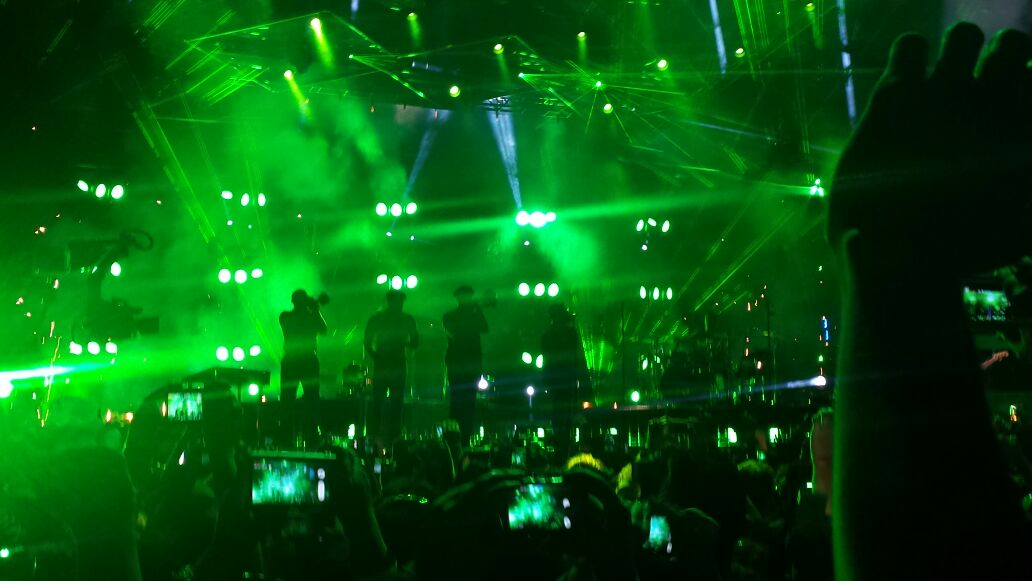
Mars and his band performing during The Moonshine Jungle Tour at the Mexico City Arena in Mexico City in September 2014.

On September 4, 2012, Mars reported to his fanbase that, "You'll hear something in October. I promise", after being asked for news regarding his second studio album. On September 19, 2012, the singer announced the release of Unorthodox Jukebox via Twitter after having worked on it for a year. He further posted a link to a "Funny or Die" video entitled "Whatta Man", where Mars starred himself in order to celebrate. On September 28, 2012, Billboard reported the album's title and its American release date on December 11, 2012. In the same article, Mars revealed some of the guest producers, including Ronson, Bhasker, Diplo and others. He was as well featured on the week's cover story in which the track list was included; it was also revealed by Digital Spy the same day.

On October 24, 2012, the album's cover was unveiled by Mars after a promo shot previously used for a Billboard issue tried to pass as the official artwork. On November 6, 2012, "Young Girls", the first promotional single from a series of three, was made available for consumption worldwide. Subsequently, "Moonshine" and "When I Was Your Man" were released as the last promotional singles on November 19, 2012, and December 3, 2012, respectively. On the next day, Unorthodox Jukebox was made available to listen to in its entirety for a week before its release.

On October 15, 2012, the album was made available for pre-order worldwide via Mars's official site, offering different options to purchase including an immediate MP3 download of "Locked Out of Heaven", the standard CD or digital release, the deluxe bundle (which included the record's physical issue, a T-shirt, and an ultimate bundle packaged similarly to the deluxe edition that featured an autographed screen print poster limited for the first 300 orders), and a key necklace for the single. The album was officially released on December 7, 2012. A year later, on November 5, 2013, the deluxe edition of the record was made available for consumption worldwide with a different cover artwork. Four days later, a DVD edition that included the music videos for the first three singles of Unorthodox Jukebox was released in Japan along with the deluxe edition of the album.

Mars performed "Locked Out of Heaven" and "Young Girls" for the first time on Saturday Night Live on October 20, 2012, while receiving positive reaction from critics and the audience. Afterwards, he sang the same songs on November 7, 2012, at the 2012 Victoria's Secret Fashion Show; the performance later aired on December 4, 2012, on CBS. On November 24, 2012, Mars appeared on the ninth season of British X Factor, where he performed "Locked Out of Heaven". On December 8, 2012, Mars performed at the 2012 edition of Jingle Bell Ball, an annually-held event promoted by Capital FM, which took place at the O2 Arena in London, whilst singing "Locked Out of Heaven" live on December 12, 2012, during the semi-finals of the second season of American X Factor. Mars further performed the record's second single on The Voice during the final show of its third season held on December 17, 2012.

The singer embarked on The Moonshine Jungle Tour starting on June 22, 2013, at the Verizon Center in Washington, D.C., United States. The first shows of the tour also featured performances in Canada and Puerto Rico until September. Its second leg, announced on February 20, 2013, consisted of concerts all over Europe; it ran from October to November 2014. The Moonshine Jungle Tour ended on October 4, 2014, having Mars performing on a total of seven legs.

== Critical reception ==
Unorthodox Jukebox ratings
Aggregate scores
Source	Rating
AnyDecentMusic?	6.4/10
Metacritic	70/100
Review scores
Source	Rating
AllMusic	2.5/5 stars
Billboard	4/5 stars
Entertainment Weekly	A−
The Guardian	3/5 stars
The Observer	3/5 stars
Paste	7/10
PopMatters	8/10
Rolling Stone	4/5 stars
Slant Magazine	3/5 stars
Spin	8/10

Unorthodox Jukebox was met with generally favorable reviews from music critics. At Metacritic, the album received an average score of 70, based on 16 reviews. Aggregator AnyDecentMusic? gave Unorthodox Jukebox 6.4 out of 10, based on their assessment of the critical consensus.

Melissa Maerz from Entertainment Weekly gave the album an A− and stated that "[Mars's] talent for crafting little pop perfections of all stripes is undeniable", describing the record as a fusion of pop and R&B. Rolling Stone magazine's Jody Rosen awarded Unorthodox Jukebox four out of five stars, writing that, "The result is a record that makes the competition sound sad and idea-starved by comparison". Dan Hyman from Spin granted the record an 8/10 rating, pointing out that "the bulk of Unorthodox Jukebox benefits from presenting [the singer] as he truly imagines himself: a big belter with an ear for pop hooks, sure, but one unafraid to dive into murkier waters." Hyman went on feeling that Mars's lyrics "get a desperately needed kick in the pants". Matt Cibula of PopMatters complimented the songs' hooks and found the album "sung and arranged just as perfectly as his earlier work [...] a truly accomplished and slick pop album". Jon Caramanica of The New York Times labelled the songwriting exceptional, while praising Mars for being "a model of concision who always knows where the trigger is, and always, always pulls it". He went on complimenting the songs on the record, "these are some of the most energy-infused but profoundly cosseted songs you’re likely to hear all year".

Billboard magazine's Jason Lipshutz described that the record "succeeds in mixing its safer stylistic choices with its relatively bold ideas". BBC Music's Matthew Horton said that the captivating album showcases the singer's knack for songs with chart potential, while noting the incorporation of rock and soul. Sarah Rodman from The Boston Globe felt Mars "is trying to rough up his image a bit" as it is undeniable in "his strong, if sometimes oddly lyrically aggressive, second album". Ryan Reed, writing in Paste, gave Unorthodox Jukebox a 7/10 rating, confessing that "Mars still plays the sweetheart card well, but he's proven himself way more interesting as a badass".

In a mixed review, Caroline Sullivan from The Guardian, Kitty Empire from The Observer, and Andrew Chan from Slant Magazine all rated Unorthodox Jukebox three out of five stars. Sullivan dubbed it "the same conventional mish-mash as his 6m-selling debut". Empire felt that Mars still lacks a characteristic style, observing "a little more hooliganism" than on his first album and feeling that, "despite its title, [it] deserves your grudging respect" while noting the incorporation of reggae on the record. The critic went on arguing that Mars's songwriting values "narrative arc and internal logic". Closing the review, Chan called it "not an unqualified triumph, Unorthodox Jukebox is a step forward" and completed his idea saying that the singer "minor limitation" and "the key to his appeal" on a record that is "a reasonably listenable exercise in genre fetishization." Andy Gill of The Independent felt that the singer is a "talented chap", but resorts to imitations of past recording artists on the album, "whose title all but gives the game away". Fiona Shepherd of The Scotsman wrote that Unorthodox Jukebox is "a safe mixtape, especially compared to what Mars can pull off live with his terrific soul revue band".

The A.V. Club's Evan Rytlewski gave Unorthodox Jukebox a C+, commenting that Mars is "an undeniable talent, desperately searching for an identity to claim as his own", though praising the tracks "Locked Out of Heaven", "Natalie", "Treasure" and "Show Me". AllMusic's Tim Sendra felt the record is "a step back from Doo-Wops & Hooligans in so many ways" and criticized the singer for being an "icky hater", hoping that "Mars can sort out his feelings about women and get back to being a sweet romancer" since his "opinion of the opposite sex seems to have taken a nosedive" after his first album's sentimental lyrics.

In September 2024, Billboard's Kyle Dines affirmed that Unorthodox Jukebox "cemented Mars's status as one of the most commercially dependable male pop stars of his time."

=== Accolades ===
Unorthodox Jukebox received a Juno Award for International Album of the Year at the 2014 Juno Awards, a Grammy Award for Best Pop Vocal Album at the 56th Grammy Awards and a nomination for Outstanding Creative Achievement in the category of Record Production/Album at the TEC Awards. It also received two additional awards, a Fonogram Award for Contemporary Pop-Rock Album of the Year and a Best Male Pop Vocal Album at the Telehit Awards, both ceremonies held in 2013. Its lead single, "Locked Out of Heaven", was nominated for Record of the Year and Song of the Year, while its Sultan + Ned Shepard remix received a nomination for Best Remixed Recording, Non-Classical at the 56th Grammy Awards. It was also nominated for Outstanding Creative Achievement in the category of Record Production/Single or Track at the TEC Awards. "Locked Out of Heaven" had previously won Best Song at the 2013 MTV Europe Music Awards. The record's second single, "When I Was Your Man", earned a nomination for Best Pop Solo Performance at the 56th Grammy Awards.

In December 2013, the album was placed at number two on online music service Rdio's list of "Top global albums" and according to Spotify, another online music service, Unorthodox Jukebox was the fifth most-streamed record worldwide. HitFix and MTV created two different lists that featured the 20 best albums of 2012, the recording ranked at number eight and 20, respectively. Suzan Gursoy of The Village Voice considered the release the 177th best albums of 2012.

== Commercial performance ==
Unorthodox Jukebox debuted at number two on the US Billboard 200 with first-week sales of 192,000 copies (134,000 physical sales and 57,000 digital sales), topping the expectations of sales earning Mars his highest peak on the chart. The next week, it sold 178,000 copies, dropping to the third position. The album secured a third consecutive week within the top five in America, withstanding a 38% sales drop to 110,000 copies. Three weeks after the debut, the record sold a total of 480,000 copies. On March 7, 2013, twelve weeks since its availability, the record reached the top spot of the Billboard 200 with 95,000 copies sold, mainly due to an Amazon MP3 sale pricing ($1.99 for a day and $3.99 for the rest of the week). The album sold 1,399,000 copies in the United States in 2013, making it the fifth best-selling album of the year. In the week of February 5, 2014, following Mars's presence at the 56th Grammy Awards and performance at the Super Bowl XLVIII halftime show, sales for the album increased by 180%, rebounding Unorthodox Jukebox back in the top ten. For the week ending February 12, 2014, the album climbed to the third position with sales of 81,000, making a total of 123,000 units sold in both weeks.

The album has been certified six times platinum by the Recording Industry Association of America (RIAA) for sales and streaming figures equivalent to six million copies. As of July 24, 2017, it has sold 2,574,000 total copies in the United States. The record's success in 2013 was decisive to Mars being chosen as the headline performance on the half-time show of the Super Bowl XLVIII, and appearing on Billboard Artist of the Year by Billboard; according to Bill Werde, an editorial director of the magazine, the singer's songs that "stuck around on multiple formats all year round" played a key role. He was also the most-played artist at Top 40 Radio, the third most played at rhythmic stations and Hot Adult Contemporary station, as well as the fifth most-played at AC stations in 2013, according to Mediabase. In addition, Mars topped three of Billboard's 2013 year-end charts (Hot 100 Artist, Mainstream Top 40 and Hot Digital Songs). The album was ranked as the 55th best album of all time on the Billboard Top 200 Albums of All Time.

In Europe, the album was similarly successful. It debuted at number one on the UK Albums Chart as the Official Charts Company predicted, with 136,000 copies sold in its first week, thus becoming the third fastest-selling album recorded by an artist in 2012, after Mumford & Sons's Babel, and Take Me Home by One Direction. It was certified four times platinum by the British Phonographic Industry (BPI). It has sold over 987,000 copies in the UK as of November 2016. The album has spent a total of 85 weeks on the United Kingdom's official albums chart.

In France, Unorthodox Jukebox debuted in the top ten and spent the whole year within the top twenty, except for two weeks. One year after its release, album sales exceeded 500,000 copies, therefore being certified diamond by the Syndicat National de l'Édition Phonographique (SNEP). As of 2014, the record sold 580,000 units in that territory. In Switzerland, the album debuted atop the charts and was certified platinum, while opening at number four on the Danish Albums Chart and becoming certified four times platinum. The record further charted within the top ten on the Spanish Albums Chart for the first time after 30 weeks, the longest time an album needed since American rock band The Black Keys's El Camino (2011) (61 weeks).

In Oceania, Unorthodox Jukebox debuted at number nine in New Zealand and was certified gold by the Recorded Music NZ, selling over 7,000 copies in two weeks. The album eventually reached its peak position at number two in that country, marking the singer's consecutive record to do so. As of June 2025, Unorthodox Jukebox was certified eight times platinum in New Zealand. The record entered the Australian charts at number three, gradually climbing to the top spot, with it bringing total sales to 210,000 units and being similarly certified by the Australian Recording Industry Association (ARIA). It was the third best-selling album in Australia in 2013. In Canada, Unorthodox Jukebox opened the Canadian Albums Chart at number two, later reaching number one on the week ending July 20, 2013. It was certified eight times platinum by Music Canada (MC). In Japan, the album debuted at number eleven on the Oricon Albums Chart. In mid-year 2017, the record sold a total of 250,000 units, therefore reaching platinum status. In 2014, the album topped the Mexican Albums Chart and remains the ninth best-selling release there, with it spending 106 weeks in the chart. It also earned a two times platinum+gold certification for exceeding sales of over 150,000 copies in that territory. As of 2014, Unorthodox Jukebox sold 3.2 million units globally, while bringing totals sales to six million copies by March 2016.

== Track listing ==
Credits adapted from the liner notes of Unorthodox Jukebox by Atlantic Records, ASCAP and Billboard.

Unorthodox Jukebox standard edition
No.	Title	Writer(s)	Producer(s)	Length
1.	"Young Girls"	Bruno Mars; Philip Lawrence; Ari Levine; Jeff Bhasker; Emile Haynie; Mac Davis	The Smeezingtons; Bhasker; Haynie	3:49
2.	"Locked Out of Heaven"	Mars; Lawrence; Levine	The Smeezingtons; Bhasker; Haynie; Mark Ronson	3:53
3.	"Gorilla"	Mars; Lawrence; Levine	The Smeezingtons; Bhasker; Haynie; Ronson	4:04
4.	"Treasure"	Mars; Lawrence; Levine; Phredley Brown; Thibaut Berland; Christopher Khan	The Smeezingtons	2:58
5.	"Moonshine"	Mars; Lawrence; Levine; Andrew Wyatt; Bhasker; Ronson	The Smeezingtons; Bhasker; Ronson	3:48
6.	"When I Was Your Man"	Mars; Lawrence; Levine; Wyatt	The Smeezingtons	3:33
7.	"Natalie"	Mars; Lawrence; Levine; Benjamin Levin; Paul Epworth	The Smeezingtons; Benny Blanco^{[a]}; Epworth^{[a]}	3:45
8.	"Show Me"	Mars; Lawrence; Levine; Dwayne Chin-Quee; Mitchum Chin	The Smeezingtons; Dwayne "Supa Dups" Chin-Quee	3:27
9.	"Money Make Her Smile"	Mars; Lawrence; Levine; Christopher "Brody" Brown	The Smeezingtons; Diplo^{[a]}	3:23
10.	"If I Knew"	Mars; Lawrence; Levine	The Smeezingtons	2:12
Total length:				32:51

Target / deluxe edition (bonus tracks)
No.	Title	Writer(s)	Producer(s)	Length
11.	"Old & Crazy" (featuring Esperanza Spalding)	Mars; Bhasker	The Smeezingtons; Bhasker; Haynie^{[a]}	1:54
12.	"Young Girls" (Demo)	Mars; Lawrence; Levine; Bhasker; Haynie		3:38
13.	"Gorilla" (Demo)	Mars; Lawrence; Levine		3:42
14.	"Moonshine" (The Futuristics Remix)	Mars; Lawrence; Levine; Bhasker; Wyatt; Ronson	The Futuristics	3:42
15.	"Locked Out of Heaven" (Major Lazer Remix)	Mars; Lawrence; Levine	Major Lazer; Junior Blender^{[a]}	4:04
Total length:				48:32

Japanese limited premium edition (bonus DVD)
No.	Title	Director(s)	Length
1.	"Locked Out of Heaven" (music video)	Mars; Cameron Duddy	3:55
2.	"When I Was Your Man" (music video)	Mars; Duddy	3:54
3.	"Treasure" (music video)	Mars; Duddy	3:11

Note

- ^{^[a]} signifies a co-record producer

Sample credits

- "Old & Crazy" contains elements of "Japanese Sandman", performed by Django Reinhardt and composed by Richard A. Whiting.

== Personnel ==
Credits adapted from the liner notes of Unorthodox Jukebox.

Technical and composing credits

- The Smeezingtons – executive producer, production (all tracks)
- Bruno Mars – vocals (all tracks), guitar (track 2), keyboards (track 5), piano (track 6)
- Mark Ronson – bass (track 5), beats (tracks 3, 5), DJ (track 2), recording (tracks 2, 3), guitar (track 5), production (tracks 2, 3, 5)
- Emile Haynie – additional drums, effects, and keyboards (track 2); production (tracks 1–3)
- Jeff Bhasker – background vocals (track 5), keyboards (tracks 2, 3, 5), production (tracks 1–3, 5)
- Andrew Wyatt – background vocals and guitar (track 5)
- Dwayne "Supa Dups" Chin Quee – production (track 8)
- Benny Blanco – co-production (track 7)
- Diplo – co-production (track 9)
- Paul Epworth – co-production (track 7)
- Nick Movshon – bass (track 2)
- Homer Steinweiss – drums (track 2)
- Steve Jordan – drums (track 3)
- Sharrod Barnes – guitar (track 3)
- Artie Smith – vibraphone and gear technician (tracks 2, 3)

Creative credits

- Willo Perron – art direction, design
- Harper Smith – photography

Recording personnel

- David Kutch – mastering (all tracks)
- Manny Marroquin – mixing (all tracks)
- Alalal – engineer (tracks 2, 3)
- Ari Levine – recording (all tracks)
- Charles Moniz – additional engineer (all tracks)
- Wayne Gordon – recording (track 2)
- Bob Mallory – assistant recording (tracks 2, 3)
- Tyler Hartman – assistant recording (tracks 2, 3)
- Brent Kolatalo – drum engineering (track 1)
- Ken Lewis – drum engineering (track 1)

== Charts ==
=== Weekly charts ===
List of chart positions
Chart (2012–2014)	Peak position
Argentine Albums (CAPIF)	8
Australian Albums (ARIA)	1
Austrian Albums (Ö3 Austria)	4
Belgian Albums (Ultratop Flanders)	4
Belgian Albums (Ultratop Wallonia)	4
Canadian Albums (Billboard)	1
Croatian International Albums (HDU)	35
Czech Albums (ČNS IFPI)	21
Danish Albums (Hitlisten)	6
Dutch Albums (Album Top 100)	4
Finnish Albums (Suomen virallinen lista)	28
French Albums (SNEP)	4
German Albums (Offizielle Top 100)	4
Hungarian Albums (MAHASZ)	1
Irish Albums (IRMA)	3
Italian Albums (FIMI)	20
Japanese Albums (Oricon)	5
Mexican Albums (Top 100 Mexico)	1
New Zealand Albums (RMNZ)	2
Norwegian Albums (VG-lista)	9
Polish Albums (ZPAV)	42
Portuguese Albums (AFP)	6
Scottish Albums (Official Charts)	7
South African Albums (RiSA)	14
South Korean Albums (Circle)	2
South Korean International Albums (Circle)	1
Spanish Albums (Promusicae)	9
Swedish Albums (Sverigetopplistan)	11
Swiss Albums (Schweizer Hitparade)	1
UK Albums (Official Charts)	1
US Billboard 200	1

=== Year-end charts ===
List of chart positions
Charts (2012)	Position
Australian Albums (ARIA)	38
Danish Albums (Hitlisten)	58
French Albums (SNEP)	61
South Korea International Albums (GAON)	28
Hungarian Albums (MAHASZ)	45
UK Albums (OCC)	24

List of chart positions
Chart (2013)	Position
Argentine Albums (CAPIF)	28
Australian Albums (ARIA)	3
Austrian Albums (Ö3 Austria)	44
Belgian Albums (Ultratop Flanders)	5
Belgian Albums (Ultratop Wallonia)	8
Canadian Albums (Billboard)	4
Danish Albums (Hitlisten)	29
Dutch Albums (MegaCharts)	19
French Albums (SNEP)	5
German Albums (Offizielle Top 100)	64
Hungarian Albums (MAHASZ)	24
Irish Albums (IRMA)	10
Japanese Albums (Oricon)	27
Mexican Albums (Top 100 Mexico)	7
New Zealand Albums (RMNZ)	3
South Korea International Albums (GAON)	18
Spanish Albums (PROMUSICAE)	20
Swiss Albums (Schweizer Hitparade)	8
Swedish Albums Chart	59
UK Albums (OCC)	6
US Billboard 200	4

List of chart positions
Chart (2014)	Position
Australian Albums (ARIA)	57
Canadian Albums (Billboard)	50
French Albums (SNEP)	43
Mexican Albums (Top 100 Mexico)	9
New Zealand Albums (RMNZ)	13
Spanish Albums (PROMUSICAE)	47
Swedish Albums (Sverigetopplistan)	38
UK Albums (OCC)	76
US Billboard 200	29

List of chart positions
Chart (2015)	Position
Mexican Albums (Top 100 Mexico)	63
Swedish Albums (Sverigetopplistan)	80
US Billboard 200	129

List of chart positions
Chart (2016)	Position
Danish Albums (Hitlisten)	94
Swedish Albums (Sverigetopplistan)	84

List of chart positions
Chart (2017)	Position
US Billboard 200	148

List of chart positions
Chart (2021)	Position
Icelandic Albums (Tónlistinn)	87

List of chart positions
Chart (2022)	Position
Danish Albums (Hitlisten)	91
Dutch Albums (Album Top 100)	69
Icelandic Albums (Tónlistinn)	56

List of chart positions
Chart (2023)	Position
Danish Albums (Hitlisten)	100
Dutch Albums (Album Top 100)	62
Icelandic Albums (Tónlistinn)	61
Swedish Albums (Sverigetopplistan)	88

List of chart positions
Chart (2024)	Position
Danish Albums (Hitlisten)	97
Dutch Albums (Album Top 100)	63
Icelandic Albums (Tónlistinn)	75

List of chart position
Chart (2025)	Position
Dutch Albums (Album Top 100)	74

=== Decade-end charts ===
List of chart positions
Chart (2010–2019)	Position
Australian Albums (ARIA)	20
UK Albums (OCC)	44
US Billboard 200	15

=== All-time charts ===
List of chart position
Chart	Position
US Billboard 200	55

== Certifications ==
List of Certifications
Region	Certification	Certified units/sales
Australia (ARIA)	3× Platinum	210,000^{^}
Austria (IFPI Austria)	Gold	10,000^{*}
Belgium (BRMA)	Gold	15,000^{*}
Brazil (Pro-Música Brasil)	Platinum	40,000^{*}
Canada (Music Canada)	8× Platinum	640,000^{‡}
Denmark (IFPI Danmark)	4× Platinum	80,000^{‡}
France (SNEP)	Diamond	500,000^{*}
Germany (BVMI)	Platinum	200,000^{^}
Hungary (MAHASZ)	Platinum	6,000^{^}
Ireland (IRMA)	2× Platinum	30,000^{^}
Italy (FIMI)	2× Platinum	100,000^{‡}
Japan (RIAJ)	Platinum	250,000^{^}
Mexico (AMPROFON)	2× Platinum+Gold	150,000^{^}
New Zealand (RMNZ)	8× Platinum	120,000^{‡}
Philippines (PARI)	2× Platinum	30,000^{*}
Portugal (AFP)	Platinum	15,000^{^}
Singapore (RIAS)	2× Platinum	20,000^{*}
Spain (Promusicae)	Platinum	40,000^{^}
Sweden (GLF)	Platinum	40,000^{‡}
Switzerland (IFPI Switzerland)	Platinum	30,000^{^}
United Kingdom (BPI)	4× Platinum	1,200,000^{‡}
United States (RIAA)	6× Platinum	6,000,000^{‡}
Summaries
Europe (IFPI)	Platinum	1,000,000^{*}
^{*} Sales figures based on certification alone.^{^} Shipments figures based on certification alone.^{‡} Sales+streaming figures based on certification alone.

== Release history ==
Release dates and formats
Region	Date	Label	Format(s)	Edition(s)
Australia	December 7, 2012	Atlantic Records	CD; digital download	Standard
Belgium	December 7, 2012	Warner Music Group	CD; digital download	Standard
Finland	December 7, 2012	Warner Music Group	CD; digital download; LP	Standard
Ireland	December 7, 2012	Atlantic Records	CD; digital download	Standard
Germany	December 7, 2012	Atlantic Records	CD; digital download; LP	Standard
New Zealand	December 7, 2012	Warner Music Group	CD; digital download	Standard
Netherlands	December 7, 2012	Warner Music Group	CD; digital download	Standard
Switzerland	December 7, 2012	Warner Music Group	CD; digital download	Standard
Czech Republic	December 10, 2012	Warner Music Group	CD; digital download	Standard
Denmark	December 10, 2012	Warner Music Group	Digital download	Standard
France	December 10, 2012	Atlantic Records	CD; digital download	Standard
Greece	December 10, 2012	Warner Music Group	Digital download	Standard
Hungary	December 10, 2012	Warner Music Group	CD; digital download	Standard
Poland	December 10, 2012	Warner Music Group	Digital download	Standard
Portugal	December 10, 2012	Warner Music Group	CD; digital download	Standard
Norway	December 10, 2012	Warner Music Group	Digital download	Standard
Sweden	December 10, 2012	Warner Music Group	Digital download	Standard
United Kingdom	December 10, 2012	Atlantic Records	CD	Standard
Canada	December 11, 2012	Warner Music Canada	CD; digital download	Standard; Target edition (Note: The Target edition is only available on CD.)
Denmark	December 11, 2012	Atlantic Records	CD	Standard
Italy	December 11, 2012	Atlantic Records	CD; digital download; LP	Standard
Mexico	December 11, 2012	Warner Music Group	CD; digital download	Standard
Spain	December 11, 2012	Atlantic Records	CD; digital download; LP	Standard
United Kingdom	December 11, 2012	Warner Music Group	Digital download	Standard
United States	December 11, 2012	Atlantic Records	CD; digital download; LP	Standard; Target edition (Note: The Target edition is only available on CD.)
Japan	December 12, 2012	Warner Music Japan	CD; digital download	Standard
Sweden	December 12, 2012	Atlantic Records	CD	Standard
Brazil	December 13, 2012	Warner Music Group	CD; digital download	Standard
New Zealand	November 5, 2013	Atlantic Records	CD	Deluxe edition
Japan	November 9, 2013	Warner Music Japan	CD+DVD	Japanese edition
United Kingdom	November 11, 2013	Atlantic Records	CD; digital download; LP	Deluxe edition
Spain	November 12, 2013	Atlantic Records	CD; digital download; LP	Deluxe edition
Australia	November 15, 2013	Atlantic Records	CD	Deluxe edition
Germany	November 22, 2013	Atlantic Records	CD; digital download; LP	Deluxe edition
France	November 25, 2013	Atlantic Records	CD; digital download; LP	Deluxe edition
