= Philip Lawrence (songwriter) =

American songwriter and voice actor (born 1974)

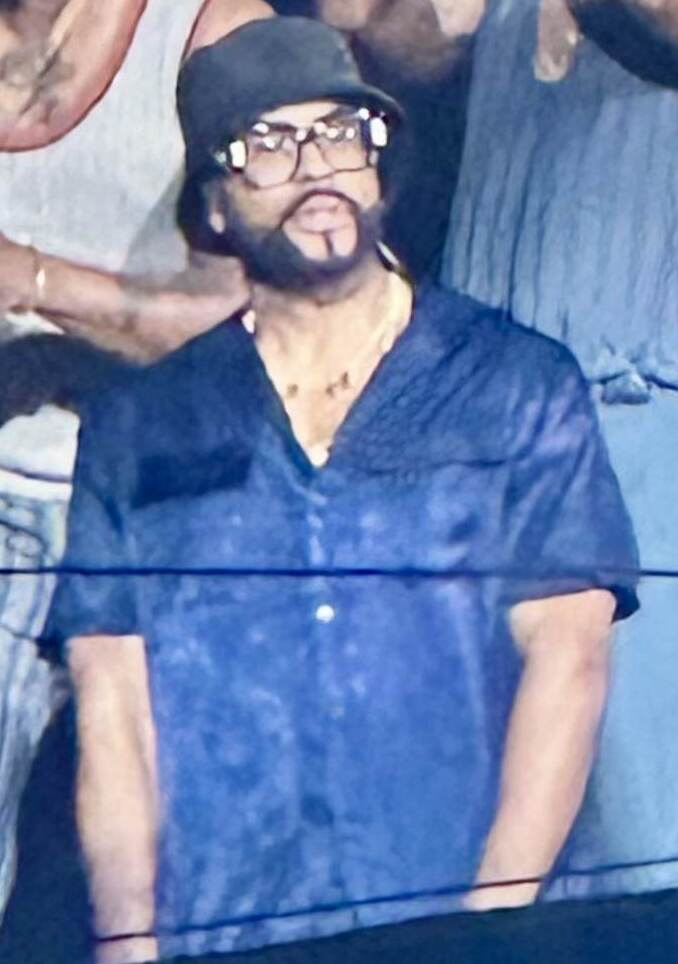
- Lawrence with The Hooligans in 2024

Background information
- Born: Philip Martin Lawrence II; July 17, 1974 (age 52); Evansville, Indiana, U.S.
- Genres: R&B; funk; pop; soul; reggae; rock; hip hop
- Occupations: Singer-Songwriter; record producer; entrepreneur; voice actor
- Years active: 2004–present
- Labels: Universal; Motown; Atlantic; Elektra
- Formerly of: The Hooligans; The Smeezingtons; Shampoo Press & Curl

Philip Martin Lawrence II (born July 17, 1974) is an American singer-songwriter, record producer, entrepreneur and voice actor, best known for his work with the songwriting and production team the Smeezingtons, alongside Bruno Mars and Ari Levine (in 2014, he lent his resonant baritone voice to make the synth-like bass line "dohs" in the song "Uptown Funk"). He has won eight Grammy Awards for his work. Lawrence's latest recording project, 24K Magic, won at the Grammys in the categories Album of the Year, Record of the Year, Song of the Year, Best R&B Song, Best R&B Album, and Best R&B Performance. Lawrence is co-writer and co-producer on the majority of the songs released under these ventures. He also sings vocal with the Hooligans band who tours with Mars. He is also a voice actor, as he is the current voice of Sebastian in The Little Mermaid franchise since 2007, replacing Samuel E. Wright.

Lawrence was first widely recognized in 2010 when he received five nominations at that year's Grammy Awards, including his first nomination for Producer of the Year, Non-Classical. Between 2010 and 2012 he received ten Grammy nominations, and in 2013 won his first Grammy award with Bruno Mars for "Best Pop Vocal Album" for Unorthodox Jukebox. In the same year, he also released his own solo album, Letters I Never Sent. He followed by participating in the second-largest viewed Super Bowl Halftime Show performing with the Red Hot Chili Peppers, receiving 115.3 million viewers. He returned again to the Super Bowl in 2016, performing parallel to Lady Gaga, Beyoncé, and Coldplay for another Halftime Show performance. Along with composing and producing hits for Bruno Mars, Lawrence has produced/wrote for Adele, Flo Rida, Lil Wayne, Wiz Khalifa, CeeLo Green and others.

Lawrence appeared in the Blue Sky Studios animated film Rio 2 as the character and voice of "Felipe". He also wrote, performed, and produced the song "It's a Jungle Out Here", as well as co-wrote "Welcome Back", for the soundtrack performed by Bruno Mars.

Lawrence founded CMNTY Culture, a multimedia venture that combines recorded music, film, television and theater production in one space. The first artist release under the CMNTY label is RMR, who released "Rascal" in 2020. In 2016, he purchased Record Plant recording studio in Los Angeles, California. Record Plant closed on July 8, 2024.

== Life and career ==
=== Early life ===
Philip Martin Lawrence was born on July 17, 1974, in Evansville, Indiana, to Philip Lawrence Sr. and Cheryl Lawrence. As the son of a gospel choir director and a radio DJ, he began performing when he was four years old and started writing songs during his teen years. He attended Reitz Memorial High School. He began taking songwriting seriously in college, and developed his core entertainment skills during his time as a performer at Walt Disney World in Florida.

=== Meeting and partnership with Bruno Mars ===
Later, in California, Lawrence worked various jobs as he attempted to break through as a songwriter and performer. During this time he began establishing himself and building his musical network, which led to his meeting with Bruno Mars and composing songs with him and other artists.

Over the course of the next year, Lawrence and Mars began working together writing songs for themselves and other artists. Their first successful songwriting project with a recognized artist was 2008's "Long Distance" by Brandy. Shortly afterwards they co-wrote Flo Rida's "Right Round", which proved to be their breakout project and resulted in many more production opportunities and acclaim in the industry. Not long after gaining their foothold in the industry, they met and partnered with Ari Levine to form the songwriting and production team, The Smeezingtons.

=== The Smeezingtons ===
The Smeezingtons were a songwriting and record production team consisting of Lawrence, Mars and Ari Levine. From 2009 to 2015, the trio were responsible for more than 16 Gold and Platinum records, some reaching 5× Platinum.

Lawrence met producer Ari Levine and was the first guest at Ari's new recording studio in Hollywood, Ca., known as LevCon Recording Studio. Lawrence later brought Mars to the studio and the three of them hit it off quickly, and they soon began writing songs and producing music together. Over the course of the next 6 years, the team wrote and produced chart topping hits for a variety of musicians including Flo Rida, Matisyahu, B.o.B., CeeLo Green, Snoop Dogg, Wiz Khalifa, Adam Lambert, Adele and others. During this time, the trio also built the foundations for Bruno Mars and the Hooligans.

The trio has since separated amicably, with Lawrence and Mars continuing on with Bruno Mars and the Hooligans, and forming a new production company named Shampoo, Press & Curl with Christopher Brody Brown.

=== Bruno Mars and the Hooligans ===
Lawrence has played a key role in Bruno Mars and The Hooligans since their inception, serving as songwriter, producer, composer and lead singer. Since 2010, their music has received worldwide commercial and critical success, winning a number of awards.

Their first album, Doo-Wops & Hooligans (2010), was the group's first official introduction to the public, and was released to commercial and critical success. The album was written and produced by The Smeezingtons and netted the group's first three Grammy nominations, including a nomination for Album of the Year. Between 2010 and 2012, they completed their first world tour, Doo-Wops & Hooligans Tour, as well as the American Hooligans in Wondaland Tour with Janelle Monáe. Both tours gave the band the opportunity for mass exposure in multiple countries across the world.

For Mars' second album, Unorthodox Jukebox (2012), The Smeezingtons once again handled the songwriting and production duties, but enlisted other producers. Their sophomore effort was also their first opportunity to branch out into more varied genres of music, which ultimately allowed them to reach a wider ranging audience. This was an important factor for Mars, as he felt it was necessary to have the freedom to record in whichever styles he was inspired. The success of this album earned Lawrence his first Grammy Award in 2013 for Best Pop Vocal Album. The world tour for Unorthodox Jukebox was the Moonshine Jungle Tour, which further spread their worldwide exposure and secured a $156 million box office gross over the course of the tour. It also marked the group's transition from theaters and ballrooms to stadiums and arenas, due to their increasing popularity and the success of their debut tour.

Their third album, 24k Magic (2016) marked the group's first album with the new songwriting and production team Shampoo, Press & Curl, consisting of Lawrence, Mars and Christopher Brody Brown. This has been the most successful album of the franchise, and swept the 2018 Grammy Awards, taking home wins for Album of the Year, Record of the Year, Song of the Year, Best R&B Song, Best R&B Album and Best R&B Performance. Along with their success at the Grammy Awards, the group also completed their most successful world tour to date, the 24k Magic World Tour, which has grossed more than $350 million worldwide.

In early 2018, Lawrence left the 24K Magic World Tour due to "an injury"., however was later confirmed on 26 June 2020, that he left as his wife had discovered he had been cheating on her. He did not return to the tour, choosing to focus instead on his other creative and business endeavors, leaving the Hooligans behind. In 2022, however, he did rejoin the Hooligans onstage during their mid-October concerts at Allianz Stadium. In 2026, Lawrence confirmed that he would not partake in The Romantic Tour, citing his recent marriage and wanting to spend more time with his children.

Lawrence has written music for Jingle Jangle: A Christmas Journey (2020).

== Influences ==
Lawrence has composed and produced in a variety of musical genres and styles throughout his career, such as Pop, Rock, Hip-Hop, R&B, Reggae, Funk, Soul, Folk. He attributes his abilities to his upbringing in a very musical home.

== Discography ==
Studio Albums

- Letters I Never Sent (2013)

== Tours and residencies ==
Tours

- Doo-Wops & Hooligans Tour (2010–12)
- Moonshine Jungle Tour (2013–14)
- 24K Magic World Tour (2017–18)

Co-headlining

- European tour with Travie McCoy (2010) (European select dates)

Opening act

- Hands All Over Tour (Maroon 5) (2010) (North American select dates)

Residencies

- Bruno Mars at The Chelsea, Las Vegas (2013–14)
- Bruno Mars at Park MGM (2017–18)

== Filmography ==
=== Film ===
- Rio 2 (2014) - Felipe (voice)
- Jingle Jangle: A Christmas Journey (2020) - Trio Singer
- Peacemaker (2023) - Grandad (voice)

=== Television ===
- The High Fructose Adventures of Annoying Orange (2012) - Mix Master BLT, Granola
- Disney Comics in Motion (2019) - Sebastian (voice)

=== Video games ===
- The Incredibles: Rise of the Underminer (2005) - Lucius Best/Frozone
- Disney Princess: Enchanted Journey (2007) - Sebastian
- Disney TH!NK Fast (2008) - Sebastian
- Kinect Rush: A Disney-Pixar Adventure (2012) - Lucius Best/Frozone
- Disney Princess: My Fairytale Adventure (2012) - Sebastian, Librarian, Man #1
- Sorcerers of the Magic Kingdom (2012) - Sebastian

=== Theme parks ===
- The Little Mermaid: Ariel's Undersea Adventure (2011) - Sebastian
