= The Smeezingtons =

American songwriting and record production team (2009–2015)

- Origin: Los Angeles, California, United States
- Genres: Pop; R&B; hip hop
- Occupations: Record producers; songwriters
- Instruments: Vocals; drums; guitar; bass guitar; keyboards
- Years active: 2009–2015
- Labels: Atlantic; Elektra; Roc Nation
- Spinoffs: Shampoo Press & Curl
- Past members: Bruno Mars; Philip Lawrence; Ari Levine

The Smeezingtons were an American songwriting and record production team consisting of Bruno Mars, Philip Lawrence, and Ari Levine formed in 2009. The Smeezingtons were established in Los Angeles, California; the trio primarily served as the producers for the singles and albums of Mars, with additional work for a diverse range of artists. Eventually, the trio split, and Mars and Lawrence formed a successor production trio with Christopher Brody Brown called "Shampoo Press & Curl".

Before Mars' mainstream breakthrough as a performer, the Smeezingtons first gained recognition after producing the song "Wavin' Flag" for Canadian singer K'naan in 2009, which was used by Coca-Cola as the theme for television coverage of the 2010 FIFA World Cup. In December of that year, the trio produced and co-wrote Mars' debut single appearance, "Nothin' on You" by American rapper B.o.B. It was their first Billboard Hot 100 number-one single, and the first of numerous successful productions for Mars's career—which resulted in two consecutive Billboard Hot 100 number-one singles in 2010 and 2013. In August 2010, they produced and co-wrote the single "Fuck You" for American singer CeeLo Green, which topped the UK Singles Chart and peaked at number two on the Billboard Hot 100.

== Career ==
=== Formation ===
Before meeting Bruno Mars, Philip Lawrence worked in theater and at Walt Disney World in Florida for seven years after finishing college. He moved to Los Angeles and was "holding down these random telemarketing jobs to keep the lights on". After Mars graduated in Hawaii, he moved to L.A. and found he could only pay rent by DJing. Before they met each other, "a lot of time was wasted working with random producers bouncing around from studio to studio but never getting anything done". Lawrence was initially reluctant to meet Mars but their collaboration worked from the start. According to Lawrence:

I got a call from [ Keith Harris ], a producer we were both working within late 2006, and he said, "I got this kid who's phenomenally talented ... but he needs a writer to help get his ideas out." At the time I was flat broke with ... no car, and it was going to cost me everything I had to get to that studio session. Plus, I was leery ... because everyone in LA says they have the next big thing. He said, "Whatever it costs you to get out here, I'll reimburse you." So I said, "Just give me five dollars back for the bus." I get to the studio, and it was Bruno, and that session was the first time either of us had written and recorded an entire song.

Mars and Lawrence started writing songs together for Mars to perform but they received rejections from labels. The duo considered moving back to their home cities but that week, they got a call from Mars's former manager Brandon Creed, who was A&Ring a reunited Menudo, who needed songs. Creed liked their song "Lost", which was written for Mars. At first Mars and Lawrence did not want to give up the song so Creed offered them $20,000 for it. Mars and Lawrence were so surprised they said; "You can have that one and whatever else you need!"; the call allowed them to stay in L.A. longer. In late 2008, Aaron-Bay Schuck (A&R), Lawrence and Mars helped write Flo Rida's single "Right Round". Lawrence and Mars decided to call their partnership The Smeezingtons.

We used to always say in the studio, "Yo, this is going to be a smash!" And then it turned into, "This is a smeeze!" Then, "This is a Smeezington." We were just like, "We should just base our whole situation upon this word. How great would it be if record labels were like, 'We have to get The Smeezingtons involved?'

— Mars, explaining how they came up with the team's name.

In 2007, Mars was a struggling singer-songwriter and Ari Levine was a producer looking to work with new songwriters. Lawrence was the first guest at Levine's studio Levcon Studios; they had previously worked together after being introduced by a mutual friend. Lawrence was responsible for connecting Mars and Levine. One day, Mars and Lawrence were sitting in a car with no money; they decided to try producing for themselves and enlisted the help of Levine, who contributed his equipment and expertise in drum programming, sampling and other electronic sounds. In 2009, The Smeezingtons settled in Hollywood and Levine joined the team. They worked over 10 hours every day for two years.

=== Collaborations ===
The Smeezingtons ventured into the U.S. market, mostly writing songs for R&B-pop performers. They were given the chance of working with acts such as Mike Posner, Cobra Starship, Chad Hugo, and Lupe Fiasco. They also wrote songs for better-known acts Flo Rida, Lil Wayne, Wiz Khalifa and CeeLo Green.

One of their first successful productions was "Get Sexy", performed by Sugababes, released in August 2009. It peaked at number two in the United Kingdom. It was followed by Matisyahu's "One Day", chosen as NBC's 2010 Winter Olympics theme. The Smeezingtons also collaborated with artist K'naan on his fourth studio album Troubadour. Coca-Cola used the album's track "Wavin' Flag" with a composition re-arranged by themselves as the theme for television coverage of the 2010 FIFA World Cup. "Wavin' Flag" topped the Ö3 Austria Top 40, the Official German Charts and the Scottish Singles charts. It brought the Smeezingtons attention from the music industry with their production and writing services increasing in demand. Levine joined them, forming a trio.

In late 2009, The Smeezingtons landed "Nothin' on You" by American rapper B.o.B's featuring Mars; it topped the Billboard Hot 100, the UK Singles chart, and the Dutch Top 40. In 2010, The Smeezingtons were responsible for "Billionaire" by American rapper Travie McCoy featuring Mars. It peaked at number four in the US, number three in the UK and topped the Dutch Top 40. In the same year, "Fuck You" by American singer CeeLo Green became another success for The Smeezingtons, reaching number one in the UK and the Netherlands, and number two on the Billboard Hot 100.

In 2011, The Smeezingtons composed "Lighters" for Bad Meets Evil, featuring Mars's vocals. It peaked at number four in the U.S. and on the Canadian Hot 100, as well as number two in New Zealand. They also worked with Snoop Dogg and Wiz Khalifa on "Young, Wild & Free", which features Mars, for the movie Mac & Devin Go to High School. The song was included on the soundtrack. The single peaked at number seven in the US, number two in New Zealand, and number six on the French charts. At the 2013 Grammy Awards, "Young, Wild & Free" was nominated for Best Rap Song.

In 2014, Mars said he was not interested in composing songs for other artists because he had to pay rent. Nevertheless, they produced "All I Ask" for Adele's third studio album 25 (2015). At the 2017 Grammy Awards, The Smeezingtons received the Grammy for Album of the Year for their work on 25; it was their last production as a team.

=== Productions for Bruno Mars and recognition ===
In May 2010, The Smeezingtons composed Mars's debut EP It's Better If You Don't Understand, using the attention they gained from the success of "Nothin' on You" and "Billionaire". The EP's four songs were included on Mars's debut studio album Doo-Wops & Hooligans, which was released in October 2010. The Smeezingtons produced and co-wrote the album, funneling lessons learned through label meetings and early hits into Mars's solo work. The album's singles "Just the Way You Are" and "Grenade" topped the Billboard Hot 100, the Australian charts, the UK Singles Chart, and singles charts in other countries. In 2011, "The Lazy Song", another success for the team, topped the UK and Danish charts, and peaked in the top ten of other countries. The three were among the best selling digital singles of 2011.

In the same year, The Smeezingtons composed Mars's single "It Will Rain" for the soundtrack of The Twilight Saga: Breaking Dawn – Part 1. The song peaked at number three on the Billboard Hot 100 and at number two in New Zealand, and entered the top 20s of charts in other countries. The team received six nominations for the 2011 Grammy Awards; they were nominated for Producer of the Year, Non-Classical for their work on "Fuck You", "Just The Way You Are", "Nothin' on You", and others. Their work on "Nothin' on You" earned them a nomination for Record of the Year, while "Fuck You" was nominated on the aforementioned category and Song of the Year. Mars won his first Grammy on the Best Male Pop Vocal Performance category for "Just The Way You Are". With the team's contributions, Levine received a Songwriters' award at the ASCAP Pop Music Awards for "Billionaire," "Just the Way You Are", and "Nothin' On You". The team also earned the ASCAP Rhythm & Soul Music Awards for Top Rap Song for "Nothin' on You".

At the 2012 Grammy Awards, The Smeezingtons were nominated in five categories, including Producer of the Year, Non-Classical for their involvement on Mars's Doo-Wops & Hooligans, "Lighters", and "Mirror" by Lil Wayne featuring Mars. Their work on "Grenade" earned the team a nomination for Record of the Year and Song of the Year. Doo-Wops & Hooligans was nominated for Album of the Year. In the same year, The Smeezingtons also co-produced and co-wrote Mars's second studio album, Unorthodox Jukebox. They were also responsible for the Billboard Hot 100 number-one songs "Locked Out of Heaven" and "When I Was Your Man", which also entered top ten of charts in other countries.

At the 2014 Grammy Awards, The Smeezingtons' work received three nominations. "Locked out of Heaven" was nominated for Record of the Year and Song of the Year, while Unorthodox Jukebox won Best Pop Vocal Album. In 2016, The Smeezingtons were not composers of Mars's third studio album, 24K Magic (2016), which led some publications to believe the trio had split. The Smeezingtons were replaced with Shampoo Press & Curl, which was composed of Mars, Lawrence, and Christopher Brody Brown. Eventually, Lawrence left the team and they disbanded.

=== Other ventures ===
The Smeezingtons said they hoped to eventually move from for-hire work to development of new artists. Their recording suite Levcon Studios was open to musicians of all genres. "I don't think you can name an artist that we don't want to work with," Mars said.

The Smeezingtons composed songs and played the instruments on those songs. Levine recorded and engineered Mars's debut EP and his first two albums, and mixed the track "Somewhere in Brooklyn". He also engineered, recorded, and mixed "Nothin' on You". Levine engineered and mixed "Billionaire" and "Young, Wild & Free".

Levcon Studios was located in Los Angeles and was co-owned by Levine and his brother and manager Josh Levine. The studios were used by The Smeezingtons and were described as a "tiny Hollywood studio" with a "whiteboard hanging on the wall". The studio is "set in a ramshackle cottage between a laundromat and a medical marijuana dispensary on a seedy Hollywood side street". In the beginning, and according to Lawrence, they "worked long and hard in this little shack, hoping just to pay rent and have someone listen to our songs". The latter also said; "we always find that we still do our best work in our little shack of a studio ... That's where we find our magic."

== Influences and style ==
Lawrence and Mars came from musical families. Lawrence grew up listening to "everything" and Mars was exposed to a diverse mix of reggae, rock, hip hop, and R&B. Their interest in music started at a very young age; Lawrence started to perform when he was four years old, and Mars started to perform when he was three years old and regularly performed with his family band by the age of four. In an article by American Songwriter, Lawrence cites acts such as Billy Joel, Elton John, and Seal as his biggest influences and inspirations. He was raised listening to acts including Isley Brothers, Eagles, Led Zeppelin, Stevie Wonder, and Billy Joel. As a child, Mars was influenced by R&B artists such as Keith Sweat, Jodeci, and R. Kelly, as well as 1950s rock 'n' roll and Motown. Later, in high school, Mars began listening to classic rock groups such as The Police, Led Zeppelin, and The Beatles. His influences include Billy Joel, Elton John, Prince, The Police, Michael Jackson, Little Richard, and Bob Marley. Mars has stated, "Ari turned out to be the secret ingredient to what me and Phil were doing", and "I'm used to live stuff. So you give me a studio with a bunch of live instruments, I can do it. But radio's not playing that stuff." The three songwriters also share a love for producers The Neptunes and Timbaland, and the hip-hop musicians of their youths who influenced them in their throwback sounds. The three said their musical influences also come from The Beatles, Police, Motown, Earth Wind & Fire, Michael Jackson, and disco music.

In their production style, The Smeezingtons start writing their songs as cathartic, freestyle jams. Lawrence said, "We'll go into the studio, and [Mars will] start playing the piano and I'll start freestyling or vice versa. We're heavily influenced by the '80s [sound]." Lawrence sees himself and Mars as "melody guys", and stated, "That's kind of our main focus, to have really good, memorable melodies". They can also start their songs' production with a "Levine beat, a Mars guitar melody, or a lyric snippet from Lawrence. They reject each other's bad ideas and encourage the good ones in "a melting pot of trial and error", according to Lawrence.

The team explained their songwriting process by saying every song should be like a "three-minute movie" that needs to have a conflict to make it interesting. Mars criticized "hit songwriters" by saying, "I liked hearing that from these hit songwriters because it seems like many times songwriters are more interested in just finishing a song than really taking the time to make a good song a hit song".

After working with The Smeezingtons on Unorthodox Jukebox, Jeff Bhasker said, "One of their great talents is that they have this fun, light vibe in the studio" that enables anyone "to be free so that you can let that primal emotion come out without being embarrassed. Then they polish afterward." Mark Ronson said the key is Mars's charisma.

Mars says the trust that the team have built in seven years of working together is essential. He added "We all know when we're onto something ... We also know when something's not jelling. And that's the thing you pray you will always have." Levine said the musical influences the three share completed his idea: "It's about finding ways to mix the classic we all love with modern songs. That's why people connect to the music on multiple levels: It's familiar-sounding but new-classic songwriting and instrumentation with a little twist". He added, "We're that weird middle ground, where there's live instruments but it's still rhythmic and pop".

== Production equipment ==
The Smeezingtons used an Akai MPC4000, three Roland Fantom S88, V‑Synth GT, a regular V‑Synth, Korg R3, MicroKorg, Novation Ultranova, Dave Smith Mopho, and two Access Virus TI's to produce music. Ari Levine stated he rarely uses MPC, Storm Drum or Addictive Drums software. In August 2012, the team purchased a Korg keyboard.

While recording, they used a Yamaha 02R, Pro Tools HD, a Manley Langevin Dual Vocal Combo as pre/compressor/EQ, a Neumann U 87, and Event SP8 speakers with an 18-inch (46 cm) Mackie. Levine said the acoustics and vocals are all recorded with the 87 and the Manley, and the basses and electric guitars via DI unit, adding; "the acoustic guitar that we use is a $150 cheap Fender". Levine runs most of the keyboards and the MPC through the 02R and uses a Mackie Big Knob as an interface. He often uses Pro Tools. He does not use MIDI extensively despite it being incorporated in Pro Tools. According to Levine, "We're not making dance songs, so we don't need the synths to do all kinds of crazy stuff. And I fairly quickly render MIDI tracks to audio in Pro Tools". In 2011, Levine was thinking about purchasing a Minimoog.

Levine said he does not use any hardware and rarely uses plugins. He said:

... my favourites are the McDSP FilterBank for my EQ, the Waves Rvox and Renaissance Compressor as my compressors, the [Waves limiter] L2, and my favourite reverb is [Avid's venerable plug‑in] D‑Verb. I also use [Line 6] Echo Farm, Sound Toys Echoboy, and, well that's pretty much it. I have many plug-ins, but I don't really use them"... "I've tried convolution reverbs, but they don't really work. They sound cheap."

He also stated the Avid Reverb One sounded substantially better than Altiverb to him.

== Critical reception ==
The New York Times reviewer Jon Caramanica wrote The Smeezingtons "[Ha]ve got a firm grip on the full spectrum of black pop, and white pop as well". Randall Roberts of Los Angeles Times wrote The Smeezingtons "[are] making some of the most cohesive yet expansive pop music today ... incredibly well-versed in the language of American music and the ways in which it can still be stretched and molded". Before Mars played at the Super Bowl halftime show in 2014, Idolator critic Kathy Iandoli praised The Smeezingtons' work on the Sugababes single "Get Sexy", calling them "a crew of talented fellas". Erik Adams, music critic, of The A.V. Club, criticized the production team by saying; "If The Smeezingtons want to keep synthesizing yesterday's favorites into today's hits ... I could find it within myself to stomach Mars on more than one night of the year", referring to "their work on Cee-Lo Green's song "Fuck You".

== Awards and nominations ==
=== ASCAP Pop Music Awards ===
Year	Nominee / work	Award	Result	Ref.
2011	Ari Levine	Songwriter	Won	

=== ASCAP's Rhythm and Soul Music Awards ===
Year	Nominee / work	Award	Result	Ref.
2011	"Nothin' On You" (with B.o.B)	Top Rap Song	Won	

=== Billboard ===
Year	Nominee / work	Award	Result	Ref.
2013	The Smeezingtons	Top 10 Producers in Music	4th	
2013	Bruno Mars	Hot 100 Songwriters	6th	
2013	Philip Lawrence	Hot 100 Songwriters	7th	
2013	Ari Levine	Hot 100 Songwriters	8th	
2025	The Smeezingtons	Top Producers of the 21st Century on the Hot 100	17th	

=== Grammy Awards ===
Year	Nominee / work	Award	Result	Ref.
2011	"Just The Way You Are"	Best Male Pop Vocal Performance	Won	
2011	The Smeezingtons	Producer of the Year, Non-Classical	Nominated	
2011	"Nothin' on You"	Best Rap/Sung Collaboration	Nominated	
2011	"Nothin' on You"	Best Rap Song	Nominated	
2011	"Nothin' on You"	Record of the Year	Nominated	
2011	"Fuck You"	Record of the Year	Nominated	
2011	"Fuck You"	Song of the Year	Nominated	
2012	"Grenade"	Song of the Year	Nominated	
2012	"Grenade"	Record of the Year	Nominated	
2012	"Grenade"	Best Pop Solo Performance	Nominated	
2012	Doo-Wops & Hooligans	Album of the Year	Nominated	
2012	Doo-Wops & Hooligans	Best Pop Vocal Album	Nominated	
2012	The Smeezingtons	Producer of the Year, Non-Classical	Nominated	
2013	"Young, Wild & Free"	Best Rap Song	Nominated	
2014	"Locked Out of Heaven"	Record of the Year	Nominated	
2014	"Locked Out of Heaven"	Song of the Year	Nominated	
2014	"When I Was Your Man"	Best Pop Solo Performance	Nominated	
2014	Unorthodox Jukebox	Best Pop Vocal Album	Won	
2017	25	Album of the Year	Won	

=== Music Week ===
Year	Nominee / work	Award	Result	Ref.
2010	The Smeezingtons	Biggest Songwriters of the Year	Won	

=== The Hollywood Reporter ===
Year	Nominee / work	Award	Result	Ref.
2013	The Smeezingtons	Top Hitmakers	5th	
