= Claudia Leitte discography =

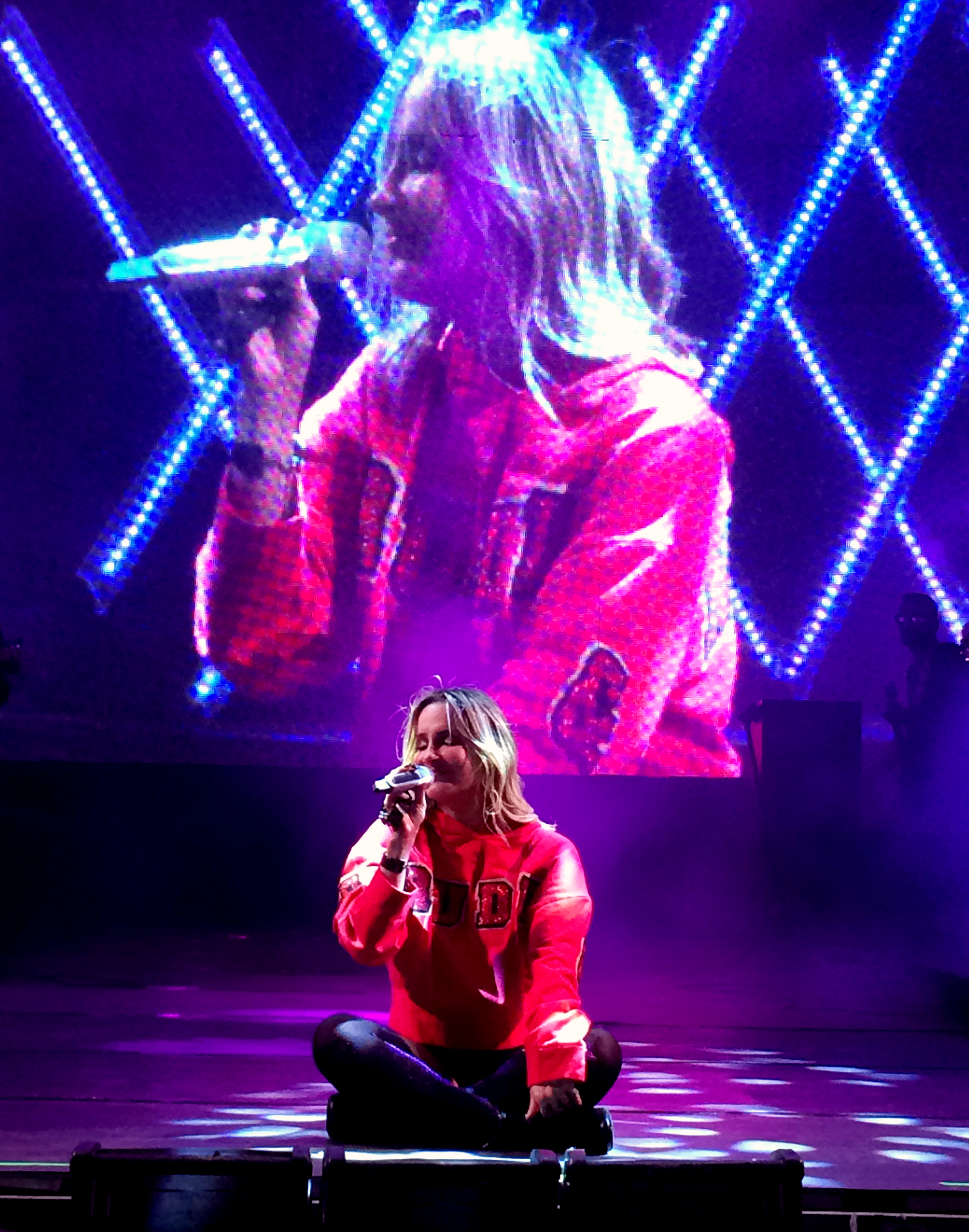
- Leitte performing during Corazón Tour, 2016
- Studio albums: 1
- EPs: 2
- Live albums: 3
- Compilation albums: 2
- Singles: 48

Brazilian pop singer Claudia Leitte has released one studio album, three live album, two compilation albums, two EPs, two promotional albums, and 48 singles (including twelve as a featured artist and eleven promotional singles). She has sold 4 million records overall.

== Album ==
=== Studio albums ===
List of studio albums, with selected chart positions, sales figures and certifications
Title	Album details	Peak chart positions	Certifications	Sales
Title	Album details	BRA	Certifications	Sales
As Máscaras	Released: May 23, 2010; Label: Sony; Format: CD, digital download	1		BRA: 50,000 (as of 2013)

=== Live albums ===
List of live albums, with selected chart positions, sales figures and certifications
Title	Album details	Peak chart positions	Certifications	Sales
Title	Album details	BRA	Certifications	Sales
Ao Vivo em Copacabana	Released: June 27, 2008; Label: Universal; Format: CD, DVD, digital download	1	BRA: Platinum	BRA: 600,000
Negalora: Íntimo	Released: August 29, 2012; Label: Som Livre; Format: CD, DVD, CD/DVD, digital download	5		BRA: 565,000
Axemusic - Ao Vivo	Released: January 16, 2014; Label: Som Livre; Format: CD, DVD, CD/DVD, digital download	10		BRA: 125,000

=== Compilation albums ===
Title	Album details
As 05 Melhores - Claudia Leitte	Released: September 19, 2008; Label: Universal; Format: digital download
Exttravase!	Released: January 30, 2013; Label: Universal; Format: digital download

=== EPs ===
Title	Album details	Sales
Ao Vivo Em Copacabana - Músicas Extraídas do DVD	Released: September 19, 2008; Label: Universal; Format: digital download	
Sette	Released: October 30, 2014; Label: Radar; Format: CD, digital download	BRA: 25,000

=== Video albums ===
List of live albums, with selected chart positions, sales figures and certifications
Title	Album details	Peak chart positions	Certifications
Title	Album details	BRA	Certifications
Ao Vivo em Copacabana	Released: June 27, 2008; Label: Universal; Format: CD, DVD, digital download	1	BRA: 3× Platinum
Negalora: Íntimo	Released: August 29, 2012; Label: Som Livre; Format: CD, DVD, CD/DVD, digital download	3	
Axemusic - Ao Vivo	Released: January 16, 2014; Label: Som Livre; Format: CD, DVD, CD/DVD, digital download	2	

== Singles ==
=== As lead artist ===
List of singles as lead artist, with selected chart positions, showing year released and album name
Title	Year	Peak chart positions	Certifications	Album
Title	Year	BRA	Certifications	Album
"Exttravasa" (solo or featuring Gabriel o Pensador)	2007	1	BRA: Diamond	Ao Vivo em Copacabana
"Pássaros"	2008	8	BRA: Platinum	Ao Vivo em Copacabana
"Beijar na Boca"	2008	2	BRA: Diamond	Ao Vivo em Copacabana
"Horizonte"	2009	11		Ao Vivo em Copacabana
"As Máscaras (Se Deixa Levar)"	2009	2		As Máscaras
"Famo$a (featuring Travie McCoy)	2010	3		As Máscaras
"Don Juan" (feat. Belo)	2010	6		As Máscaras
"Água"	2010	12		As Máscaras
"Trilhos Fortes"	2011	13		As Máscaras
"Preto"	2011	79		—
"Dia da Farra e do Beijo"	2011	44		Axemusic - Ao Vivo
"Bem Vindo Amor"	2012	42		Negalora – Íntimo
"Largadinho"	2012	20		Axemusic - Ao Vivo
"Quer Saber?" (featuring Thiaguinho)	2013	50		Axemusic - Ao Vivo
"Tarraxinha" (featuring Luiz Caldas)	2013	61		Axemusic - Ao Vivo
"Claudinha Bagunceira"	2013	61		Axemusic - Ao Vivo
"Deusas do Amor" (with Ivete Sangalo)	2014	74	BRA: Gold	—
"Dekolê" (featuring J. Perry)	2014	—		Axemusic - Ao Vivo
"Talento" (with Michel Teló)	2014	61		—
"Matimba"	2014	—		Sette
"Cartório" (solo or featuring Luan Santana)	2014	—		Sette
"Signs"	2015	—		Sette
"Corazón" (featuring Daddy Yankee)	2015	—		—
"Shiver Down My Spine" (featuring J. Perry)	2016	90		—
"Taquitá"	2016	61	BRA: Gold	—
"Baldin de Gelo"	2017	—		TBA
"Lacradora" (featuring Maiara & Maraisa)	2017	77		TBA
"Carnaval" (featuring Pitbull)	2018	—		TBA
"Te Amo Tanto" (with Paolo)	2018	74		Orgulho e Paixão
"Balancinho"	2018	—		TBA
"Saudade" (featuring Hungria Hip-Hop & Olodum)	2018	—	—	TBA

==== As featured artist ====
Year	Single	Album
2004	Doce Desejo (Bruno e Marrone feat. Claudia Leitte)	Bruno e Marrone - Ao Vivo
2004	Ê Saudade (Jammil e uma Noites feat. Claudia Leitte)	Ao Vivo na Balada
2006	Amor de Carnaval (Orlando Morais feat. Claudia Leitte)	Tempo Bom
2007	Um Sonho a Dois (Roupa Nova feat. Claudia Leitte)	RoupaAcústico 2
2009	Sorri, Sou Rei (Natiruts feat. Claudia Leitte)	Raçaman
2010	Parente do Avião (Carlinhos Brown feat. Daniela Mercury, Ivete Sangalo, Margareth Menezes, Claudia Leitte, Armandinho & Luiz Caldas)	Non-album single
2010	Mesma Luz (Carol Celico feat. Claudia Leitte)	Carol Celico
2011	Samba (Ricky Martin feat. Claudia Leitte)	Música + Alma + Sexo
2012	Enamorado (Adair Cardoso feat. Claudia Leitte)	Adair Cardoso - Ao Vivo
2014	We Are One (Ole Ola) (Pitbull feat. Jennifer Lopez & Claudia Leitte)	One Love, One Rhythm
2014	Samba Rock Com Dendê (Ju Moraes feat. Claudia Leitte)	Em Cada Canto Um Samba

==== Promotional singles ====
Year	Single	Album
2010	Paixão	As Máscaras
2010	Faz Um	As Máscaras
2011	Elixir (feat. Olodum)	Axemusic - Ao Vivo
2012	Magalenha (feat. Sérgio Mendes)	Negalora - Íntimo
