= Little Brazil =

Little Brazil could refer to:

- Little Brazil, Manhattan, neighborhood of New York City
- Little Brazil: An Ethnography of Brazilian Immigrants in New York City, 1993 book by Maxine L. Margolis
- Little Brazil (band), American rock band
