= Flávia =

Flávia is a Portuguese-language girl's name. It is the equivalent of Flavia (name) found in Italy and Spain.

== People ==
- "Flávia", a 1987 song by Hermeto Pascoal from the album So Nao Toca Quem Nao Quer: Only If You Don't Want It
- Flávia Delaroli (1983), Brazilian swimmer
- Flávia Nadalutti (1961), Brazilian swimmer
- Flávia Fernandes (1981), Brazilian water polo player
- Flávia Moraes (1959), Brazilian Filmmaker
