= Sette (Claudia Leitte EP) =

EP by Claudia Leitte
- Released: October 30, 2014
- Recorded: 2014
- Studio: Studio Base; Studio Groove
- Genre: Axé; Mambo; Latin Pop; Ragga; Reggae
- Length: 20:03
- Language: Portuguese
- Label: 2T's Entretenimento; Radar Records
- Producer: Luciano Pinto; Claudia Leitte

Claudia Leitte chronology
Axemusic - Ao Vivo (2014)	Sette (2014)

Singles from Sette
- 1. "Matimba" Released: October 9, 2014; 2. "Cartório" Released: November 2, 2014

Sette is an extended play by the Brazilian recording artist Claudia Leitte, released on October 30, 2014. The EP brings the songs "Matimba", "Cartório", "Foragido" featuring Brazilian reggae singer Edson Gomes, "Carreira Solo", "Abraço Coletivo" and "Salvador". For the release of the EP on CD, a remix version of "Matimba" featured Big Sean and MC Guimê was included in the track list. According to Leitte, the album was done "thinking in the summer, Brazilian Carnival, on the beach and barbecue".

== Track listing ==
Sette – Digital edition
No.	Title	Writer(s)	Length
1.	"Matimba"	Luciano Pinto; Fábio Alcântara; Claudia Leitte; Duller; Samir	3:43
2.	"Cartório"	Tierry Coringa; Magno Sant'Anna	2:47
3.	"Foragido" (featuring Edson Gomes)	Coringa; Sant'Anna; Leitte	3:24
4.	"Carreira Solo"	Nilton Maya; Bina Farofa; Marcelinho Black; Pinone Tavares	3:23
5.	"Abraço Coletivo"	Coringa; Samir	3:27
6.	"Salvador"	Edmar Filho; Henrique Cerqueira; Rafael Bernardo	3:16
Total length:			19:20

Sette – CD
No.	Title	Writer(s)	Length
7.	"Matimba (Remix)" (featuring Big Sean e MC Guimê)	Pinto; Alcântara; Leitte; Duller; Samir; Big Sean; MC Guimê	3:03
Total length:			22:23

Sette – Promo edition
No.	Title	Writer(s)	Length
1.	"Matimba"	Pinto; Alcântara; Leitte; Duller; Samir	3:43
2.	"Cartório"	Coringa; Sant'Anna	2:47
3.	"Dekolê"	Antenor Heve; Jonathan Perry; Jean Leonard Tout Puissant; Leitte	3:30
4.	"Largadinho"	Duller; Alcântara; Samir	3:35
5.	"Te Ensinei Certin" (with Ludmilla)	Jhama	2:12
6.	"Portuñol" (featuring Beto Perez)		3:55
7.	"Carreira Solo"		3:23
8.	"Foragido" (featuring Edson Gomes)	Coringa; Sant'Anna; Leitte	3:25
9.	"Seu Ar"	Tatau; Xixinho	3:56
10.	"Salvador"		3:15
11.	"Tarraxinha" (featuring Luiz Caldas)	Duller; Alcântara; Samir; J. P. Feury; Luiz Caldas	3:43
12.	"Pancadão Frenético" (featuring Wesley Safadão)	Nilton Maya; Marcelinho Black; Bina Farofa	2:59
13.	"Abraço Coletivo"	Coringa; Samir	3:27
14.	"Claudinha Bagunceira"	Tatau; Xininho	3:21
Total length:			47:12

== Release history ==
Country	Date	Format	Label
Brazil	October 30, 2014	digital download; streaming	2T's Entretenimento
Brazil	December 5, 2014	Promo CD	2T's Entretenimento
Brazil	December 17, 2014	CD	2T's Entretenimento; Radar Records
