= Maxine Margolis =

American anthropologist

Dr. Maxine Margolis
- Education: Columbia University
- Scientific career
- Fields: Anthropology
- Workplaces: University of Florida

Maxine L. Margolis is an American anthropologist and an inductee of the American Academy of Arts and Sciences. She is Professor Emerita of anthropology at the University of Florida in Gainesville, and has been with the university since 1970. Margolis holds a Ph.D. in anthropology from Columbia University. Margolis received the BRASA Lifetime Contribution Award in 2014.

== Bibliography ==
- Goodbye Brazil: Émigrés from the Land of Soccer and Samba. Madison WI: University of Wisconsin Press (2013)
- Goodbye Brazil: Imigrantes Brasileiros no Mundo. São Paulo, Editora Contexto (2013).
- An Invisible Minority: Brazilian Immigrants in New York City. Gainesville, FL University Press of Florida (2009)
- True to Her Nature: Changing Advice to American Women Prospect Heights, IL.: Waveland Press (2000 )
- Little Brazil: An Ethnography of Brazilian Immigrants in New York City Princeton: Princeton University (1994)
- Little Brazil: Imigrantes Brasileiros em Nova York, Portuguese edition of Little Brazil: An Ethnography of Brazilian Immigrants in New York City. Campinas, São Paulo: Papirus Editora (1994)
- Science, Materialism and the Study of Culture: Readings in Cultural Materialism, co-edited with Martin F. Murphy. Gainesville: University Press of Florida (1995)
- An Invisible Minority: Brazilians Immigrants in New York City rev.ed, Gainesville: University Press of Florida (2009)
- Women in Fundamentalism: Modesty, Marriage and Motherhood, Rowman & Littlefield (2020)
