= Little Brazil: An Ethnography of Brazilian Immigrants in New York City =

1993 academic book by Maxine L. Margolis

Little Brazil: An Ethnography of Brazilian Immigrants in New York City is a 1993 academic book by Maxine L. Margolis, published by Princeton University Press.

== Contents ==
The initial part of the book describes the immigration process while the second is about acclimation to living in New York City.

The author uses the sidebar to hold research-generated anecdotes to allow the main body to concentrate on her main ideas.

== Reception ==
Ann E. Biddlecom of Brown University stated it is "recommended reading" for the subject, although she wished some aspects about the lives of the subjects were better developed in the text. She stated that some concepts are repeated in multiple parts of the book.

Jeffrey Lesser of Connecticut College overall praises the book, while his critique of the repeating concepts is, according to him, a "small criticism".

William P. Norris of Oberlin College stated that the "broad" scope of the book was its "strength".

== Editions ==
- Little Brazil: Imigrantes Brasileiros em Nova York, Portuguese edition of Little Brazil: An Ethnography of Brazilian Immigrants in New York City. Campinas, São Paulo: Papirus Editora (1994)

== See also ==
- Little Brazil, Manhattan
- An Invisible Minority: Brazilians in New York City
