= Axemusic - Ao Vivo =

Live album by Claudia Leitte
- Released: January 16, 2014
- Recorded: August 3, 2013
- Genres: Latin pop, Electropop, Dance-pop, Axé
- Length: 51:02
- Languages: Portuguese, english
- Label: Som Livre
- Directors: Tamis Lustre; Alceu Neto; Claudia Leitte
- Producers: Webster Santos; Luciano Pinto; Betto Júnior

Claudia Leitte chronology
Negalora: Íntimo (2012)	Axemusic - Ao Vivo (2014)	Sette (2014)

Singles from Axemusic - Ao Vivo
- 1. "Dia da Farra e do Beijo" Released: October 28, 2011; 2. "Largadinho" Released: September 22, 2012; 3. "Quer Saber?" Released: June 7, 2013; 4. "Tarraxinha" Released: October 25, 2013; 5. "Claudinha Bagunceira" Released: November 19, 2013; 6. "Dekolê" Released: January 1, 2014

Axemusic - Ao Vivo (English: Axemusic - Live) is the fourth solo album and the third live album and DVD by the Brazilian recording artist Claudia Leitte, released on January 16, 2014. The album was recorded during a concert performed on August 3, 2013, at "Arena Pernambuco" in São Lourenço da Mata, Pernambuco, Brazil.

== Track listing ==
=== CD ===
No.	Title	Writer(s)	Length
1.	"Claudinha Bagunceira"	Tatau; Xininho	3:22
2.	"Amor Toda Hora"	Fabinho Obrian; Magno Sant' Anna; Sinho Maia; Ivan Brasil	3:34
3.	"Largadinho"	Duller; Fabinho Alcântara; Samir	3:37
4.	"Tarraxinha" (feat. Luiz Caldas)	Duller; Fabinho Alcântara; Samir	3:44
5.	"Pancadão Frenético" (feat. Wesley Safadão)	Nilton Maya; Marcelinho Black; Bina Farofa	3:00
6.	"Me Pega de Jeito" (feat. Wanessa & Naldo Benny)	Alvaro Socci	3:41
7.	"Seu Ar"	Tatau; Xixinho	3:57
8.	"Artemanha"	Tatau; Neto Lins; Xixinho	3:48
9.	"Dekolê (Dekole)"	Antenor Heve; Jonathan Perry; Jean Leonard Tout Puissant; Claudia Leitte	3:31
10.	"Turbina"	Kenno; Galego Duarte; Luciano Pinto; Alan Moraes; Nino Balla; Durval Luz; Carlos Pitanga	2:53
11.	"Dia da Farra e do Beijo"	Marcos Paulo; Rulian	3:12
12.	"Elixir"	Claudia Leitte; Luciano Pinto; Alan Moraes; DeepLick; Yan Acioli	4:10
13.	"Quer Saber?" (feat. Thiaguinho)	Henrique Cerqueira	3:51
14.	"Prece"	Tatau; Eva Cavalcante	3:06
15.	"Bizarre Love Triangle / A Camisa e o Botão"	New Order; Jauperi; Tenison del Rey	4:16
Total length:			51:02

Axemusic - Ao Vivo – iTunes bonus live videos
No.	Title	Length
16.	"Claudinha Bagunceira"	3:20
17.	"Largadinho"	3:41
18.	"Tarraxinha" (feat. Luiz Caldas)	3:55
19.	"Pancadão Frenético" (feat. Wesley Safadão)	3:02
20.	"Me Pega de Jeito" (feat. Wanessa e Naldo Benny)	3:42
21.	"Dekolê (Dekole)"	3:35
22.	"Dia da Farra e do Beijo"	3:14
23.	"Bizarre Love Triangle / A Camisa e o Botão"	4:13
Total length:		68:24

=== DVD & Blu-ray ===
No.	Title	Writer(s)	Length
1.	"Waterfall / Elixir"	Claudia Leitte; Luciano Pinto; Alan Moraes; DeepLick; Yan Acioli
2.	"Beijar na Boca / Insolação do Coração"	Blanch; Roger Tom; Carlinhos Brown; Michael Sullivan
3.	"Faz Um"	Carlinhos Brown; Alain Tavares
4.	"Claudinha Bagunceira"	Tatau; Xininho
5.	"Tarraxinha" (feat. Luiz Caldas)	Duller; Fabinho Alcântara; Samir
6.	"Largadinho" (feat. Zumba Fitness)	Duller; Fabinho Alcântara; Samir
7.	"Sambah"	João Nabuco
8.	"Fulano in Sala"	Sérgio Rocha; Adson Tapajós; Zeca Brasileiro
9.	"Me Pega de Jeito" (feat. Wanessa & Naldo Benny)	Alvaro Socci
10.	"Amor Perfeito"	Michael Sullivan; Paulo Massadas; Lincoln Olivetti; Robson Jorge
11.	"Seu Ar"	Tatau; Xixinho
12.	"Quer Saber?" (feat. Thiaguinho)	Henrique Cerqueira
13.	"Artemanha"	Tatau; Neto Lins; Xixinho
14.	"Pancadão Frenético" (feat. Wesley Safadão)	Nilton Maya; Marcelinho Black; Bina Farofa
15.	"Amor Toda Hora"	Fabinho Obrian; Magno Sant' Anna; Sinho Maia; Ivan Brasil
16.	"Dia da Farra e do Beijo"	Marcos Paulo; Rulian
17.	"Dekolê"	Antenor Heve; Jonathan Perry; Jean Leonard Tout Puissant; versão: Claudia Leitte
18.	"Caranguejo / Safado, Cachorro, Sem-vergonha"	Luciano Pinto; Durval Luz; Nino Balla; Alan Moraes; Cristiane Teles; Júnior Seixas; Luizinho; Alex Napolitano
19.	"Turbina"	Kenno; Galego Duarte; Luciano Pinto; Alan Moraes; Nino Balla; Durval Luz; Carlos Pitanga
20.	"Chame Gente / Vassourinha" (feat. Armandinho & Luiz Caldas)	Morais Moreira; Armandinho; Matias da Rocha; Batista Ramos
21.	"Eu Fico / Perdi a Minha Paz"	Claudia Leitte; Luciano Pinto; Sérgio Rocha
22.	"Prece"	Tatau; Eva Cavalcante
23.	"Bizarre Love Triangle / A Camisa e o Botão"	New Order; Jauperi; Tenison del Rey
24.	"Meu Segredo"	Sérgio Rocha; Claudia Leitte
Total length:			1:48:26

DVD & Blu-ray – Bonus feature
No.	Title	Writer(s)	Length
1.	"Magalenha / Locomotion Batucada" (feat. Nação do Maracatu Porto Rico)	Carlinhos Brown; João Nabuco; Alice Autran
2.	"Moda Nova"	Magno Sant'Anna; Filipe Escanduras; Fabinho O'Brian
3.	"Making Of"

== Awards and nominations ==
List of awards and nominations for the album and singles.

Year	Ceremony	Award	Result	Recipient
2011	Troféu Band Folia	Best Song	Won	Dia da Farra e do Beijo
2012	Prêmio Folia	Best Song	Won	Dia da Farra e do Beijo
2012	Prêmio Você Na Folia	Best Song	Won	Dia da Farra e do Beijo
2012	Troféu Badalando	Best Song	Won	Largadinho
2013	Prêmio Folia	Best Song	Won	Largadinho
2013	Prêmio Multishow	Best Song	Nominated	Largadinho
2013	Troféu Castro Alves	Best Song	Nominated	Largadinho
2014	Prêmio Aratu Online	Best Song	Won	Claudinha Bagunceira
2014	Troféu Band Folia	Best Song	Nominated	Claudinha Bagunceira

== Charts ==
=== Weekly charts ===
Chart (2014)	Peak position
Brazilian Albums (Billboard)	1
