= List of Dutch Top 40 number-one singles of 2010 =

This is a list of the Dutch Top 40 number-one singles of 2010. The Dutch Top 40 is a chart that ranks the best-performing singles of the Netherlands. It is published by radio station Radio 538.

In 2010, 12 acts gained their first Dutch number-one single either as lead or featured act: Owl City, Train, B.o.B, Bruno Mars, Stromae, Yolanda Be Cool, DCUP, Travie McCoy, Swedish House Mafia, Pharrell, Cee Lo Green and Mohombi. That means all of the acts who became number one this year got their first Dutch number-one single.

Bruno Mars got his first number-one single as a featured artist in "Nothin' On You" for two weeks, his second again as a featured artist in "Billionaire" for one week, and his third as his first single as a lead artist in "Just the Way You Are" for 11 straight weeks. The last time that an act was number-one for 11 weeks was in 2007, when André Hazes and Gerard Joling became number-one for 11 weeks with "Blijf Bij Mij". The last time an artist had three number-one singles in one year happened in 2006, when Marco Borsato hit the number-one position with Because We Believe featuring Andrea Bocelli, Rood and Everytime I Think of You featuring Lucie Silvas.

It is the first time that the Dutch Top 40 only got 10 number-one singles in one year, and the third time (after 1988 and 1990) that there were no Dutch number one-singles.

This year, there were two singles that held the number-one position for just one week (Billionaire and Bumpy Ride), which has not happened since 2007.

== Chart history ==
Issue date	Song	Artist(s)	Reference(s)
January 2	"Fireflies"	Owl City	
January 9	"Fireflies"	Owl City	
January 16	"Fireflies"	Owl City	
January 23	"Fireflies"	Owl City	
January 30	"Fireflies"	Owl City	
February 6	"Fireflies"	Owl City	
February 13	"Fireflies"	Owl City	
February 20	"Fireflies"	Owl City	
February 27	"Fireflies"	Owl City	
March 6	"Hey, Soul Sister"	Train	
March 13	"Hey, Soul Sister"	Train	
March 20	"Hey, Soul Sister"	Train	
March 24	"Hey, Soul Sister"	Train	
April 3	"Hey, Soul Sister"	Train	
April 10	"Hey, Soul Sister"	Train	
April 17	"Hey, Soul Sister"	Train	
April 24	"Nothin' on You"	B.o.B featuring Bruno Mars	
May 1	"Nothin' on You"	B.o.B featuring Bruno Mars	
May 8	"Alors on danse"	Stromae	
May 15	"Alors on danse"	Stromae	
May 22	"Alors on danse"	Stromae	
May 29	"Alors on danse"	Stromae	
June 5	"Alors on danse"	Stromae	
June 12	"Alors on danse"	Stromae	
June 19	"Alors on danse"	Stromae	
June 26	"Alors on danse"	Stromae	
July 3	"We No Speak Americano"	Yolanda Be Cool & DCUP	
July 10	"We No Speak Americano"	Yolanda Be Cool & DCUP	
July 17	"We No Speak Americano"	Yolanda Be Cool & DCUP	
July 24	"We No Speak Americano"	Yolanda Be Cool & DCUP	
July 31	"We No Speak Americano"	Yolanda Be Cool & DCUP	
August 7	"We No Speak Americano"	Yolanda Be Cool & DCUP	
August 14	"We No Speak Americano"	Yolanda Be Cool & DCUP	
August 21	"We No Speak Americano"	Yolanda Be Cool & DCUP	
August 28	"Billionaire"	Travie McCoy featuring Bruno Mars	
September 4	"One"	Swedish House Mafia featuring Pharrell	
September 11	"One"	Swedish House Mafia featuring Pharrell	
September 18	"Fuck You"	Cee Lo Green	
September 25	"Fuck You"	Cee Lo Green	
October 2	"Fuck You"	Cee Lo Green	
October 9	"Bumpy Ride"	Mohombi	
October 16	"Just the Way You Are"	Bruno Mars	
October 23	"Just the Way You Are"	Bruno Mars	
October 30	"Just the Way You Are"	Bruno Mars	
November 6	"Just the Way You Are"	Bruno Mars	
November 13	"Just the Way You Are"	Bruno Mars	
November 20	"Just the Way You Are"	Bruno Mars	
November 27	"Just the Way You Are"	Bruno Mars	
December 4	"Just the Way You Are"	Bruno Mars	
December 11	"Just the Way You Are"	Bruno Mars	
December 18	"Just the Way You Are"	Bruno Mars	
December 25	"Just the Way You Are"	Bruno Mars	

== Number-one artists ==
Position	Artist	Weeks #1
1	Bruno Mars	14
2	Owl City	9
3	Stromae	8
3	Yolanda Be Cool & DCUP	8
4	Train	7
5	Cee Lo Green	3
6	B.o.B	2
6	Swedish House Mafia	2
6	Pharrell	2
7	Mohombi	1
7	Travie McCoy	1

== See also ==
- 2010 in music
- List of number-one hits (Netherlands)
