= Flávia Moraes =

Brazilian director and filmmaker (born 1959)

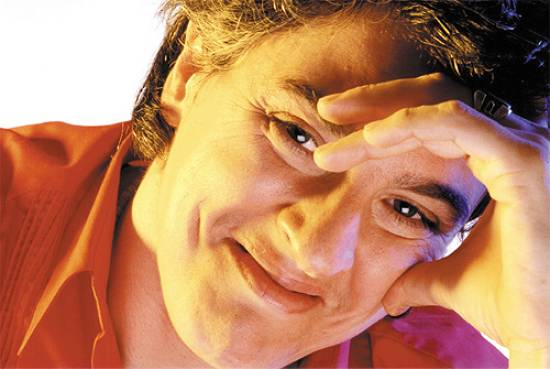
Flavia Moraes

Flavia Mello Moraes de Oliveira (born 25 April 1959 in Porto Alegre) is a Brazilian director and filmmaker. Owner of an important career in audiovisual and advertising, Flavia Moraes has built an expressive career as a director for over 30 years. Produced and directed more than 3,000 commercials, documentaries, movies and music concerts.

== Summary ==
With documentaries, short and feature films, musica concerts, theater shows and over 3,000 internationally directed commercials, Flavia Moraes is one of the leading filmmakers of her generation and one of the first Brazilian directors to join the Directors Guild of America. Three times winner of the Caboré award, Flavia received international awards such as Clio and Cannes Lions Awards.

Pioneer in Branded Content projects, the director innovated the independent production model to television with the series "To Frito" and "Galera Animal", aired on open TV and produced in partnership with Nestle, inaugurating the concept of branded content in Brazil. Also for television, directed the episode "A teu lado leve", which marked the end of the TNT series Fronteras, presented by Argentine director Juan Campanella.

Flavia signed the DVD's/shows: "Quatro Estações" (Sandy & Junior), "30 anos de Coragem" (Chitãozinho e Xororó), "Sou Menino do Morumbi", "Dalai Lama no Brasil" and "Cartola para todos". On two occasions directed the opening show of Rock in Rio, in 2001 with Sandy & Junior and 2011 with Claudia Leitte for those who made at the same year the acoustic show "Negalora", recorded at the Teatro Castro Alves in Salvador, with participations of Carlinhos Brown and the composer Sergio Mendes.

More recently, Flavia Moraes signed the direction of "A regra do jogo", based on story of Luis Fernando Verissimo, a film that represents Brazil on the project "World Champion Stories". Among his films are the trilogy O Brinco, Mentira and Olímpicos, also from Verissimo, and the long science fiction Acquária, considered a superproduction for the Brazilian cinema standards, and one of the few representatives of the genre produced in the country.

For 23 years Flavia Moraes was in charge of Filmplanet, a company created in 1989. The company has developed a remarkable trajectory in domestic and international production, with operations in São Paulo, Los Angeles, Buenos Aires and Rio de Janeiro. In 2012, she sold the Filmplanet, interrupting its commercial director's career.

In 2013, invited by Grupo RBS, conducted an investigation aimed at identifying trends to be applied by the company in its media business and also shared with the market and the public, called The Communication (R)Evolution, which brings together the contemporary thinkers ideas and university academics. Project assumptions are the basis of innovation work and language that the director held at the Grupo RBS.

In the company was the creator of OCTO, an experimental Pluri-channel that develops new languages and standards for the production and display of content, focusing on branded content, collaborative content, V.O.D. and real-time-marketing.

During the period when worked in the group, the filmmaker participated in the redesign of Zero Hora newspaper, created VOX - an event that started the dissemination of study The Communication (R)Evolution - produced corporate videos for the brand, conductor qualification trainings for multimedia teams, created Contest - content festival for YouTubers. Flavia also collaborated with Maurício Sirotsky Sobrinho Foundation, where directed three editions of RBS Award of Education and designed the game 'Logus/The saga of knowledge', which stimulated the development of socio-emotional skills of hundreds of educators and students from public and private schools.

After serving for three years in the Grupo RBS and complete the innovation cycle, Flavia Moraes returns to the axis São Paulo/Los Angeles to work on new innovation projects focused on branded content. At the same time, Flavia coordinates the pre-production of his first authorial film, an adaptation of the novel "Down the Rabbit Hole" of Mexican author Juan Pablo Villa Lobos and monthly writes for the newspaper Zero Hora.

== Awards ==
- Three times awarded with the Caboré Prize, the distinguished Brazilian Advertising Award.
- She has received SAWA Lions, Clios, Fiaps, and a New York Festival Gold Prize.
- Having achieved an accomplished career in the Brazilian advertising market, Moraes created a prize-winning trajectory for herself as a director for the last 30 years.
- Winner of the Golden Palm in the New York Film Festival, and recipient of the prestigious Clio, Moraes was also awarded at Cannes Lions International and FIAP. In Brazil she received the special juried award from the 1st FESTRIO with "Beijo Ardente/Overdose" also winner of Video Brasil (Museum of Image and Sound/São Paulo). Moraes was also presented three times with the distinguished "Caboré", considered the most important prize in the Brazilian advertising and television market.
- In the early 1990s, Moraes's talent as a director caught attention outside the advertising circle with her trilogy of films based on short stories written by the Brazilian writer Luis Fernando Verissimo:

"O Brinco"/"The Earring" - (an official selection in the Berlin Film Festival), "Mentira"/"Lie" (honorable mention in the NY Film Festival), and "Olimpicos"/"Olympics". These shorts initiated the movement "Cinema de Sucata" that produced films using the negative and sets left over from major advertising campaigns.

- A veteran behind the camera on projects that include more than three thousand commercials, documentaries, short films and music videos, Flavia Moraes directed her first feature film "Acquaria" in December 2004.
- She produced and directed the documentary "Druptchen" focusing on Buddhist religious traditions, lensed from the point of view of a group of children, a film that earned Flavia an invitation from the Brazilian Committee to Support Tibet to document the visit of the XIV Dalai Lama in Brazil. "Teachings in Brazil" and "The Dalai Lama in Brazil", were both released on DVD.
- In 2009, she produced and directed Children of Morumbi (Sou Menino do Morumbi), a music-concert that evolved into a UN documentary showing the day-to-day life of teenagers living on the edge of São Paulo.
- The Morumbi Children's Association, brings together kids from the slums focusing on education through the teaching of music.

That same year, Moraes directed "Cartola para todos"/"Cartola for all" the concert that reunited a group of important musicians to celebrate the work of the famous Brazilian composer Cartola. This piece is part of a new documentary soon to be released.

- Pioneering projects for Branded Content, Moraes reinvented the model for independent television production in Brazil with the series: "To Frito"/"I'm fried" (MTV) and "Galera Animal"/"Animal Troup" (Rede Globo) both fully sponsored by major advertisers.
- More recently, Moraes directed "A regra do jogo"/"The Rule of the Game", which will represent Brazil in the feature "World Champion Stories" to be launched during the next World Cup and "A teu lado leve"/"Barely at your side", the final episode of the mini series "FRONTERAS" produced by TNT and the Argentinean director Juan Campanella, who also presented the show.
- Well known for her talent in working with actors, Moraes has directed many celebrities such as Telly Savalas, Sarah Jessica Parker, Dean Cain, Ornella Muti, Fernanda Montenegro, Rodrigo Santoro, Lima Duarte, Raul Cortes, Milton Gonçalves, Sergio Mendes to name a few.
- Moraes's work is not restricted to the screen. The director also staged the Argentinian version of the famous Brazilian play, "Stay with me tonight" by Flavio de Souza. The comedy achieved critical & public recognition in Buenos Aires. Back home, Moraes directed the awarded concert "Four Seasons", by the duo Sandy & Jr., the first show in Brazil using spectacular special effects.

She also directed "30 years of Courage" the concert that celebrated the career of country musicians Chitão&Xororo. Both were launched on DVD by Universal Music.

- On two occasions Moraes staged the opening act for Rock'n Rio,

In 2001 (Sandy& Jr.) and in 2011 (Claudia Leitte). Each performance was attended by a crowd of over 100.000 fans. For Claudia Leitte, Moraes also staged the recital "Negalora", filmed at Teatro Castro Alves in Salvador, Bahia, with Carlinhos Brown & Sergio Mendes as special guests.

- The work developed by Moraes for Claudia Leitte has been the strategic core for the international debut of the Brazilian singer. The music videos, "Samba" with Claudia and Ricky Martin and "Magalena" with Sergio Mendes, produced in the US had more than 2 million hits on the internet.
- For the last 21 years, Moraes was the director/partner of FilmPlanet, the company she created in 1989.

Filmplanet, developed an impressive path in the National/ International market of production within the operations of São Paulo, Los Angeles, Buenos Aires, Santiago and Rio de Janeiro. During this time, Moraes produced and directed campaigns for brands such as Coke, Budweiser, MasterCard, Visa, Motorola, Toyota, Smirnoff, Nestle, among hundreds of others and was the first Brazilian director to be affiliated with DGA.

- In April 2012, FilmPlanet evolved into PLANET the production community, proposing a new concept for the production market.

Aligned with international trends the new PLANET opened its doors for new collaborators and directors, allowing Flavia to pursue her dream.

- No longer focused on the advertising industry nowadays Moraes is preparing her return to the stages and screens with the musical "Midsummer, a play with songs", (David Greig & Gordin McIntyre), and the adaptation for the big screens of the awarded novel "Fiesta en la Madriguera" (Down the Rabbit hole) by Juan Pablo Villalobos.

== Cinema and Television ==
In the early 90s, her talent as a director began to draw attention out of the advertising circle with the trilogy of films based on short stories of writer Luis Fernando Verissimo, "O Brinco" (official selection of the Berlin Film Festival), "Mentira" (honorable mention in New York Film Festival) and "Olímpicos". The short stories gave start to the "scrap film" movement, which produced movies from negative scraps and junk of the advertising campaigns scenarios.

Veteran behind the camera in projects that include more than three thousand commercials, documentaries, short films and music-videos, Flavia Moraes made his debut in feature film direction with "Acquaria" in December 2004. She also made the documentary "Druptchen for us", focusing on Buddhist religious traditions from the point of view of a group of children. The film earned him the invitation of the Palas Athena Institute and the Brazilian Committee of Support to Tibet to document the visit of the 14th Dalai Lama to the country, "Teachings in Brazil" and "The Dalai Lama in Brazil," both released on DVD.

In 2009, she produced and directed "Sou Meninos do Morumbi", a show that gave rise to the documentary that shows the daily life of the Meninos do Morumbi, an organization that brings together children from Paraisópolis favela in São Paulo around the teaching of music. At the same time, also recorded at the Ibirapuera Auditorium, the show "Cartola para Todos" brought together a cast of great musicians to celebrate the work of the composer Cartola and will be the conducting line of a new documentary.

A pioneer in branded content projects, the director innovated the television independent production model with the series: "Tô Frito" (Band & MTV) and "Galera Animal" (Globo), both entirely sponsored by a major advertiser.

More recently, Moraes directed "A Regra do Jogo", which will represent Brazil in the feature-length episodes "World Champion Stories" and "A teu lado leve", episode that marked the end of the mini-series Fronteras produced by TNT and by Argentine director Juan Campanella, who also presents the program.

Recognized by the refinement of his work in directing actors and skill with children, Moraes drove names like Telly Savalas, Sarah Jessica Parker, Ornella Mutti, Fernanda Montenegro, Rodrigo Santoro, Paulo Betti, Marcos Palmeira, Milton Gonçalves, Vera Fischer and Lima Duarte to name a few.

== Teather and Music ==
The work of Flavia Moraes however, is not restricted to the screen. The director also signed the Spanish version of the stage show "Fica comigo esta noite", of the author Flavio de Souza, which had success of critics and audiences in Buenos Aires. In Brazilian stages Flavia directed the award-winning show "Quatro Estações" de Sandy & Junior, and the 30-year recital of the duo Chitãozinho & Xororó, "30 Anos de Coragem", both released on DVD by Universal Music.

On two occasions, she signed the opening show of Rock in Rio: in 2001 with Sandy & Junior and in 2011, when returned to the main stage of the Festival with the controversial concert of Claudia Leitte, for who made at the same year the show/DVD "Negalora", recorded at the Teatro Castro Alves in Salvador, with the participation of Carlinhos Brown and Sergio Mendes.The work designed and developed by Moraes for Claudia Leitte was the basis of the international launch strategy of the Brazilian singer. The music-video "Samba" with Ricky Martin and "Magalenha" with Mendes, both filmed in the United States, have more than two million hits on the internet.

== Entrepreneurship and Management ==
In the past 21 years Flavia Moraes was in the front of Filmplanet, the company she founded in 1989. The production company has operations in São Paulo, Los Angeles, Buenos Aires and Rio de Janeiro. During this period, Moraes produced and directed campaigns for brands such as Coca-Cola, Budweiser, MasterCard, Visa, Motorola, Toyota and Nestle, among hundreds of others and was one of the first Brazilian directors to join the D.G.A. – Directors Guild of America. In April 2012, the Filmplanet became the PLANET Production Community, inaugurating a new production model in Brazil. In line with international trends of production in the new network PLANET, opened its doors to new employees, thus emancipating its founder and main director.

Invited to act as General Manager of Innovation and Language at Grupo RBS, one of the most important Brazil's media groups, Moraes also prepares his return to the screen with the adaptation for film and television award-winning novel "Festa no Covil" of Juan Pablo Villalobos and ends the documentary "The Communication (R)Evolution", a study on the future of communication.
