= Brazilian Day =

Annual festival celebrating Brazilian culture

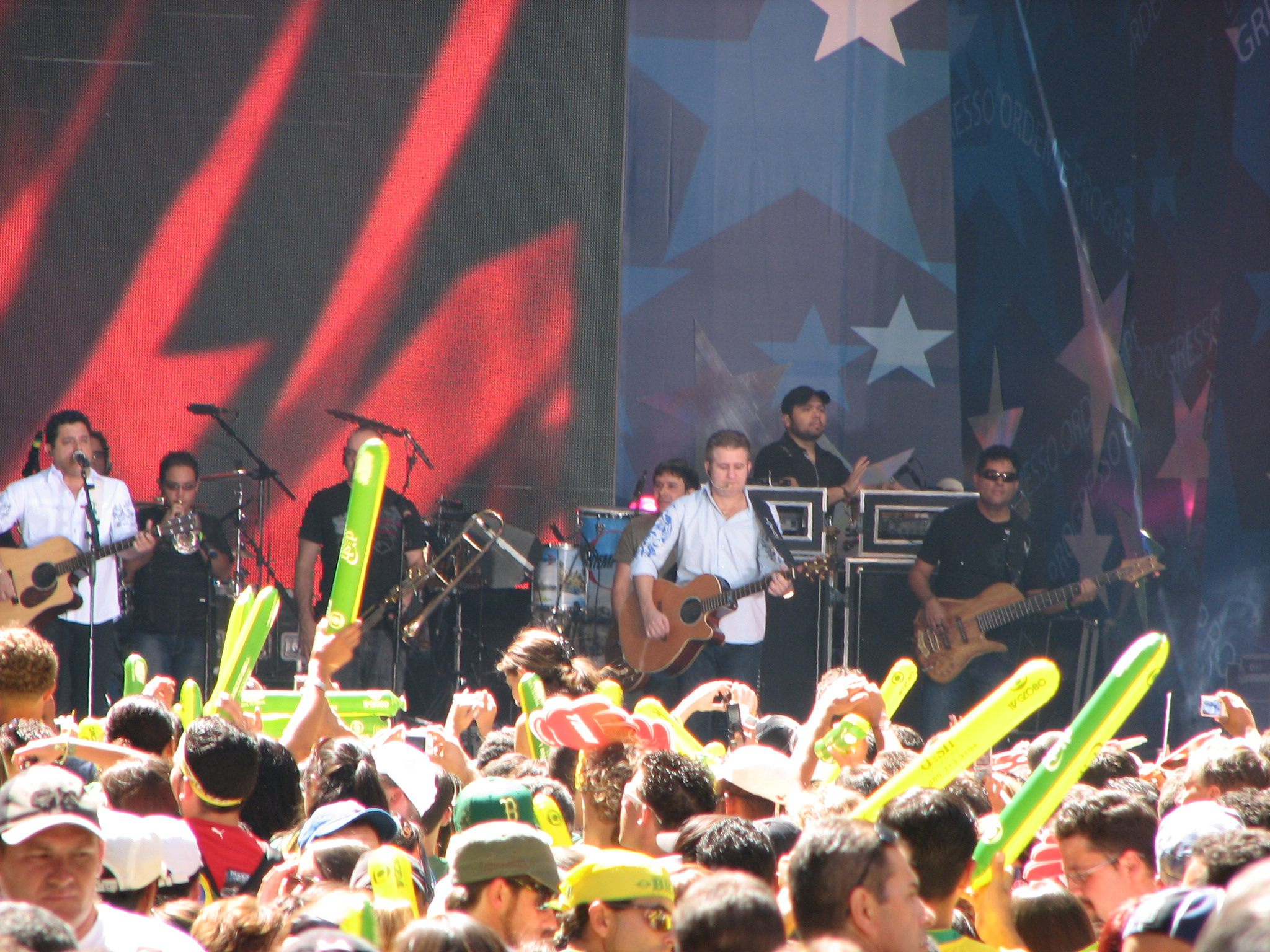
Bruno e Marrone playing at Brazilian Day in New York, 2007

Brazilian Day is an annual festival which takes place in New York City (NYC) and other cities around the world. It is held near the beginning of September to celebrate Brazil's independence day celebrated today in the Federative Republic of Brazil on September 7, 1822 - proclaimed by prince regent - heir to the Portuguese throne Dom Pedro I (1798-1834), from the previous United Kingdom of Portugal, Brazil and the Algarves (and his father King Joao VI / John VI, 1767–1826), establishing the new Empire of Brazil (1822-1889) in South America. Brazilian Day is always on Sunday before the American Labor Day holiday weekend.

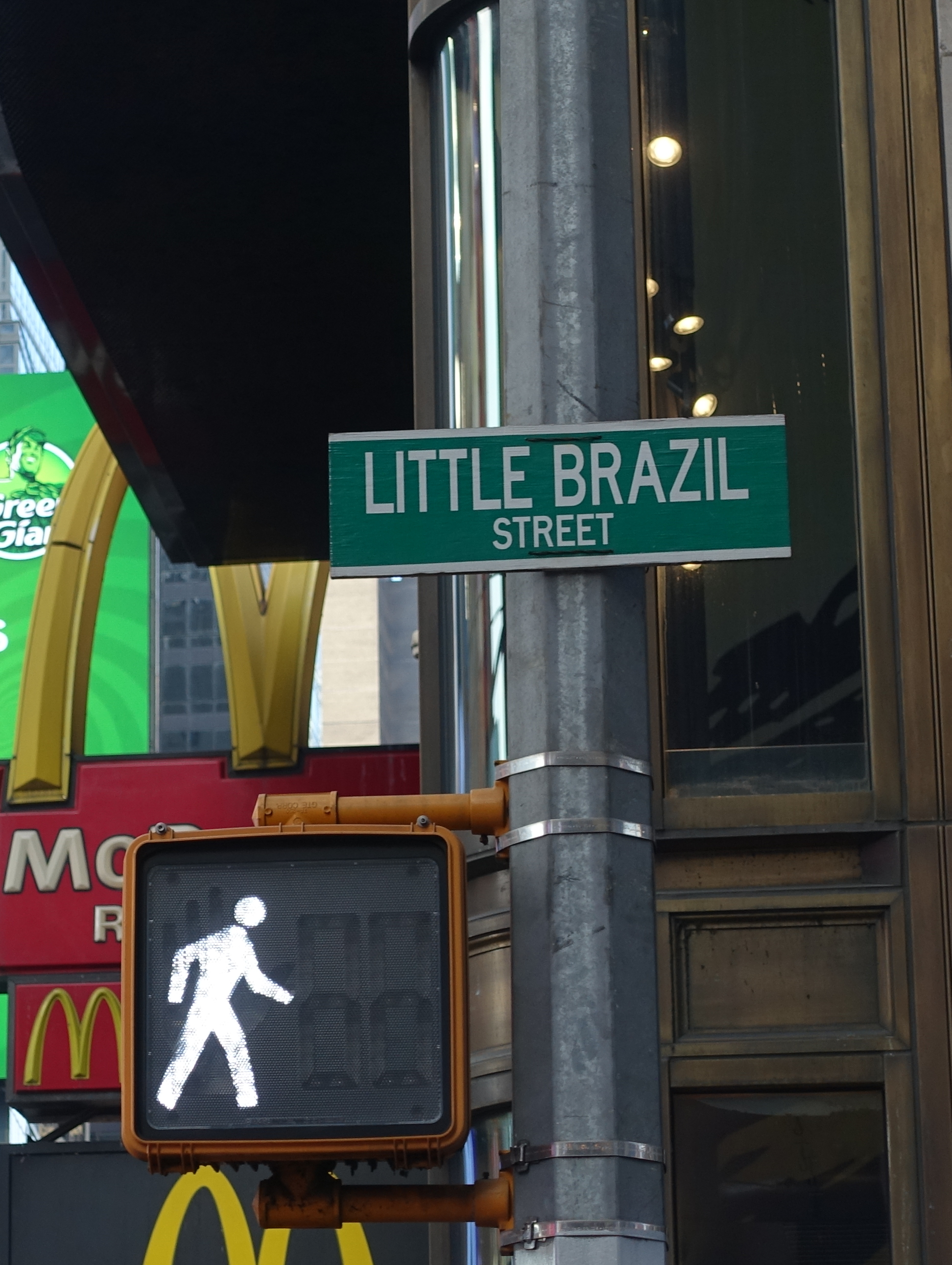
Street sign Little Brazil

Brazilian Day is part of the official calendar of New York City. The event first ran in 1984, and was on West 46th Street between 5th Avenue and Avenue of the Americas (6th Avenue), which later received the name "Little Brazil". From 2009 on, Brazilian Day also has taken place in the United States (San Francisco), Canada (Montreal, Toronto), Japan (Tokyo), United Kingdom (London) and Angola (Luanda).

Over time, Brazilian Day in New York has grown larger and has moved to nearby broader 6th Avenue, between 42nd and 46th Streets, becoming one of the biggest and most famous Brazilian attractions outside of Brazil itself. Currently, the event takes up over 25 blocks. At the festival, a big crowd attends to see the spectacles and visit the stands in which are sold Brazilian food and products. Baterias de Samba (samba drum and musician groups) play in the street and the people dance. "Rede Globo" television has been broadcasting the NYC Brazilian Day in the last few years, making the festival well known in Brazil.

Brazilian Day NYC was created in 1984, by the founder of the Brazilian American Cultural Center (BACC Travel), João De Matos. The first event was more of a block party centered on West 46th street between 5th Ave and Avenue of the Americas. Today, this same area is known as Little Brazil, Manhattan because Mayor Rudy Giuliani had this area so proclaimed. In 1984 the festival only showcased arts and crafts from Brazil, as well as Brazilian cuisine, but today it introduces New Yorkers and other visitors to the culture of Brazil.

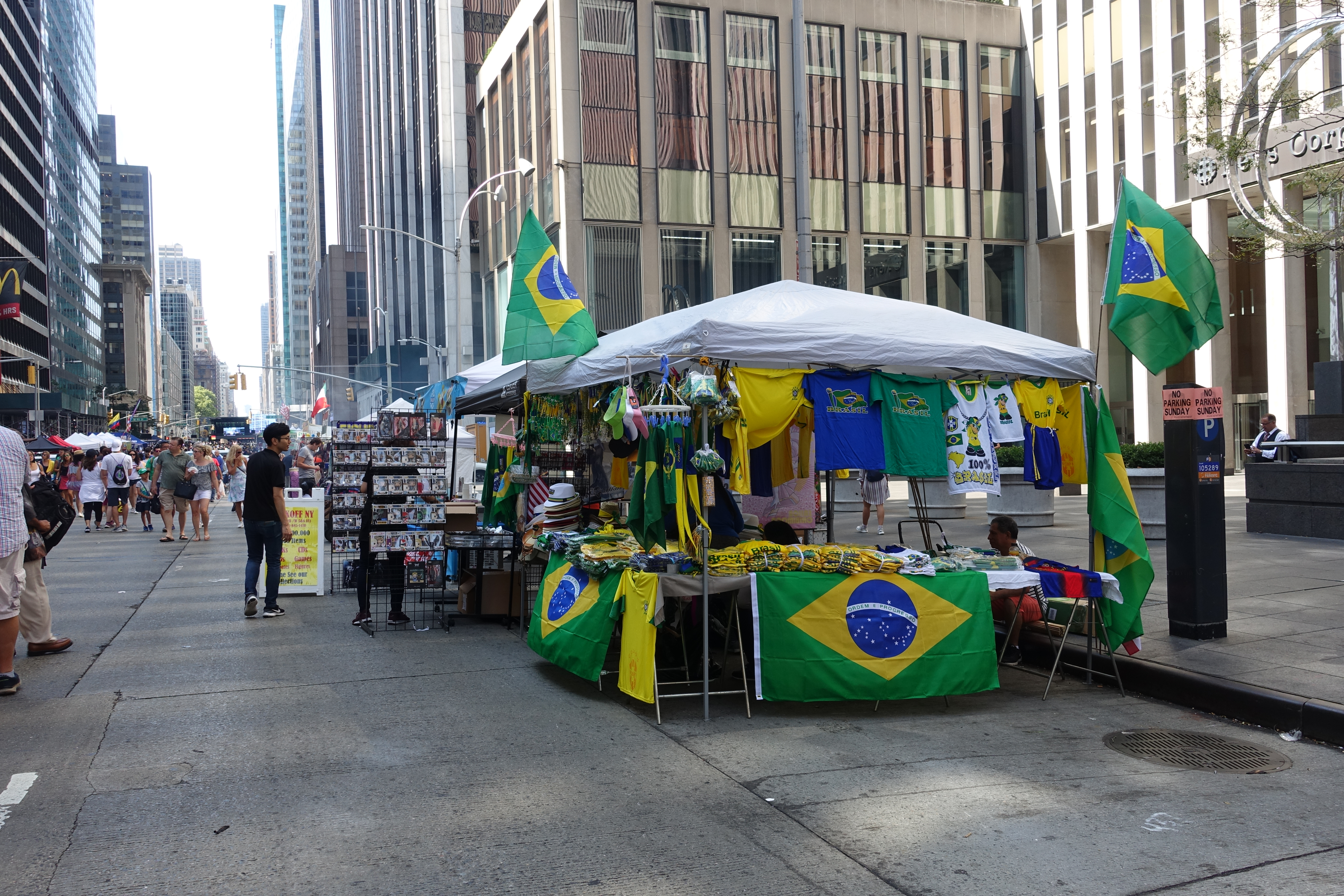
Stand with products related to Brazil

Brazilian Day has become a mega event, with over one million people from across the US, Brazil and other countries across the globe celebrating. For the music attractions, which feature some of the most famous bands and singers from Brazil, people line up the night before to make sure they will get a good view of the huge stage set in the middle of 6th Avenue. Keeping with tradition, there are various stands with arts and crafts from Brazil and typical foods.

Brazilian Day has already brought many acclaimed Brazilian artists, such as Blitz, Kid Abelha, Jorge Ben Jor, Carlinhos Brown, Claudia Leitte, Skank, Jota Quest, Alcione Nazareth, Ivete Sangalo, Elba Ramalho, Marcelo D2, Sandy e Júnior, Daniela Mercury, Lulu Santos, Zeca Pagodinho, Banda Calypso and many other artists. Brazilian Day has also brought new successful artists of Brazilian music, such as Luan Santana, Gusttavo Lima, and Jorge & Mateus.
