= Negalora: Íntimo =

Live album by Claudia Leitte
- Released: August 29, 2012
- Recorded: December 13, 2011
- Genre: Pop, MPB, Reggae
- Length: 57:08
- Language: Portuguese, english, spanish
- Label: Som Livre
- Producer: Claudia Leitte; Flávia Moraes

Claudia Leitte chronology
As Máscaras (2010)	Negalora: Íntimo (2012)	Axemusic - Ao Vivo (2014)

Singles from Negalora: Íntimo
- 1. "Locomotion Batucada" Released: September 12, 2011; 2. "Bem-vindo Amor" Released: March 21, 2012

Negalora: Íntimo (English: Negalora: Intimate) is the second live album by the Brazilian recording artist Claudia Leitte, released on August 29, 2012. The album was recorded during a benefit concert performed on December 13, 2011, at "Teatro Castro Alves" in Salvador, Bahia. The title refers to a nickname given to Leitte by frequent collaborator and Academy Award nominated musician Carlinhos Brown in 2005.

== Track listing ==
On August 13, 2012, the store "Saraiva" revealed the track list of the CD and DVD with the pre-sale.

=== CD ===
Negalora: Íntimo – Standard edition
No.	Title	Writer(s)	Length
1.	"Bem-vindo Amor"	Claudia Leitte; Sérgio Rocha	4:12
2.	"Dois Caminhos (Mestre e Aprendiz)"	Leitte; Rocha	3:40
3.	"Afaste-se de mim" (Alejate de Mi)	Mario Alberto Dominguez Zanzar; Leitte	4:21
4.	"Crime" (feat. Henrique Cerqueira)	Henrique Cerqueira	4:12
5.	"Telegrama"	Zeca Baleiro	3:21
6.	"Medley: Pra Todo Efeito / Amantes Cinzas" (feat. Carlinhos Brown)	Batatinha; Lula Carvalho; Carlinhos Brown; Arnaldo Antunes	3:08
7.	"GPS"	Brown	4:08
8.	"Black Man" (feat. Coro Imucsal)	Carlinhos Conceição; Rubinho; Silvio Mury	4:35
9.	"O Tempo Não Pára" (feat. Tico Santa Cruz)	Cazuza; Arnaldo Brandão	4:35
10.	"A Noite dos Jangadeiros (Clareou)"	Jorge Vercillo; Jota Veloso	3:11
11.	"Falando Sério"	Mauricio Duboc; Carlos Colla	3:41
12.	"Sorri, Sou Rei" (feat. Max Viana)	Alexandre Carlo	4:31
13.	"Sambah"	João Nabuco	3:01
14.	"Locomotion Batucada"	João Nabuco; Alice Autran	2:50
15.	"Magalenha" (feat. Sérgio Mendes)	Brown	3:47
Total length:			57:08

Negalora: Íntimo – Bonus edition
No.	Title	Writer(s)	Length
1.	"Bem-vindo Amor"	Leitte; Rocha	4:12
2.	"Dois Caminhos (Mestre e Aprendiz)"	Leitte; Rocha	3:40
3.	"Afaste-se de Mim" (Alejate de Mi)	Zanzar; Leitte	4:21
4.	"Crime" (feat. Henrique Cerqueira)	Cerqueira	4:12
5.	"Telegrama"	Baleiro	3:21
6.	"Medley: Pra Todo Efeito / Amantes Cinzas" (feat. Carlinhos Brown)	Batatinha; Carvalho; Brown; Antunes	3:08
7.	"Amor Super-herói"	Marcony Scaramussa	4:06
8.	"GPS"	Brown	4:08
9.	"Black Man" (feat. Coro Imucsal)	Conceição; Rubinho; Mury	4:35
10.	"Você Existe em Mim"	Brown, Lester Mendez, Josh Groban	5:02
11.	"O Tempo Não Pára" (feat. Tico Santa Cruz)	Cazuza; Arnaldo Brandão	4:35
12.	"A Noite dos Jangadeiros (Clareou)"	Vercillo; Jota Veloso	3:11
13.	"Falando Sério"	Duboc; Colla	3:41
14.	"Sorri, Sou Rei" (feat. Max Viana)	Carlo	4:31
15.	"Incendeia"	João Nabuco	3:35
16.	"Sambah"	Nabuco	3:01
17.	"Locomotion Batucada"	Nabuco; Alice Autran	2:50
18.	"Magalenha" (feat. Sérgio Mendes)	Brown	3:47
Total length:			69:49

=== DVD ===
Negalora: Íntimo – DVD
No.	Title	Writer(s)	Length
1.	"Pássaros"	Mikael Mutti
2.	"Dois Caminhos (Mestre e Aprendiz)"	Claudia Leitte; Sérgio Rocha
3.	"A Noite dos Jangadeiros (Clareou)"	Jorge Vercillo; Jota Veloso
4.	"Bem-vindo Amor"	Leitte; Rocha
5.	"No Carnaval de Salvador"	Rocha; Zeca Brasileiro; Adson Tapajós
6.	"Telegrama"	Zeca Baleiro
7.	"GPS"	Carlinhos Brown
8.	"Afaste-se de Mim" (Alejate de Mi)	Mario Alberto Dominguez Zanzar; Leitte
9.	"Falando Sério"	Mauricio Duboc; Carlos Colla
10.	"Amor Super-herói"	Marcony Scaramussa
11.	"O Tempo Não Pára" (feat. Tico Santa Cruz)	Cazuza; Arnaldo Brandão
12.	"Você Existe em Mim"	Brown; Lester Mendez; Josh Groban
13.	"Magalenha" (feat. Sérgio Mendes)	Brown
14.	"Sambah"	João Nabuco
15.	"Incendeia"	Nabuco
16.	"Corda do Navio Negreiro" (narration by: Edson Montenegro)	Nabuco; Castro Alves
17.	"Medley: Pra Todo Efeito / Amantes Cinzas" (feat. Carlinhos Brown)	Batatinha; Lula Carvalho; Brown; Arnaldo Antunes
18.	"Repente da Negalora" (feat. Carlinhos Brown)	Brown
19.	"Black Man" (feat. Coro Imucsal)	Carlinhos Conceição; Rubinho; Silvio Mury
20.	"Locomotion Batucada" (feat. Davi Pedreira)	Nabuco; Alice Autran
Total length:			82 min

Negalora: Íntimo – Bonus videos
No.	Title	Writer(s)	Length
1.	"Magalenha" (studio music video) (feat. Sérgio Mendes)	Brown
2.	"Crime" (feat. Henrique Cerqueira)	Henrique Cerqueira
3.	"Sorri, Sou Rei" (feat. Max Viana)	Alexandre Carlo
4.	"Mas Que Nada" (feat. Gracinha Laporace & Sérgio Mendes)	Jorge Ben
Total length:			100 min

== Awards ==
Year	Ceremony	Award	Result
2012	Prêmio Folia	Best Album	Won

== Commercial performance ==
The album debuted at number nine on Brasil Top 20 Semanal, with sales of 80,000, equivalent to Gold Record for CD and DVD. Until June 2013, the CD sold over 65,000 copies and the DVD has sold more than 80,000 copies, for a total of 145,000 physical copies of the album.

The CD peaked at number five in Brazil, the DVD peaked at number three. In the iTunes Store, the album reached number one in Brazil.

== Charts ==
=== Weekly charts ===
Chart (2012)	Peak position
Brazilian Albums Chart (Billboard)	5
Brazilian Video Albums Chart (Billboard)	3

=== Year-end charts ===
Chart (2012)	Rank
Brazilian Albums Chart (Billboard)	37
Chart (2013)	Rank
Brazilian Albums Chart (Billboard)	48

== Release history ==
Country	Date	Format	Label
Brazil	August 10, 2012	digital download	Som Livre
Brazil	August 10, 2012	digital download (bonus edition)	Som Livre
Brazil	August 28, 2012	CD; DVD; CD/DVD (bonus edition)	Som Livre
