= Ao Vivo em Copacabana =

Live album by Claudia Leitte
- Released: June 27, 2008
- Recorded: February 17, 2008
- Genre: Axé
- Languages: Portuguese, english
- Label: Universal
- Producers: Sérgio Rocha; Robson Nonato

Claudia Leitte chronology
Ao Vivo em Copacabana (2008)	As Máscaras (2010)

Singles from Ao Vivo em Copacabana
- 1. "Exttravasa" Released: November 13, 2007; 2. "Pássaros" Released: April 11, 2008; 3. "Beijar na Boca" Released: November 9, 2008; 4. "Horizonte" Released: May 24, 2009

Ao Vivo em Copacabana (English: Live in Copacabana) is the first live album by the Brazilian recording artist Claudia Leitte, released on June 27, 2008. The album was recorded during a single concert performed on February 17, 2008, at Copacabana beach in Rio de Janeiro in front of audiences of up to one million people. The disc had sold over 700,000 copies, which earned her a certified Triple Platinum and Gold Record by ABPD.

== Track listing ==
On June 27, 2008, the album was released in CD and digital download formats. A DVD with two discs set was released on August 11, 2008. On disc one comes a concert recorded on Copacabana beach, in addition to music videos and making of. On disc two comes a documentary showing the last few months of Claudia in the band Babado Novo and the beginning of his solo career. An extended play with songs that are only on DVD was released only for digital download on September 5, 2008.

=== CD ===
Ao Vivo em Copacabana – CD
No.	Title	Writer(s)	Length
1.	"Exttravasa" (Extravasa / Rap Incidental) (feat. Gabriel o Pensador)	Sérgio Rocha; Zeca Brasileiro; Adson Tapajós; Jean Carvalho; Gabriel o Pensador	4:22
2.	"Doce Paixão"	Ramon Cruz	3:41
3.	"Cai Fora / Foto Na Estante / Banho De Chuva"	Sérgio Rocha; Zeca Brasileiro; Adson Tapajós	4:31
4.	"Bola de Sabão" (feat. Badauí)	Ramon Cruz	4:21
5.	"No Carnaval de Salvador"	Sérgio Rocha; Zeca Brasileiro; Adson Tapajós	4:22
6.	"Busy Man (Sem Você)" (feat. Carlinhos Brown)	Carlinhos Brown; Arnaldo Antunes	2:58
7.	"Insolação do Coração"	Carlinhos Brown; Michael Sullivan	3:40
8.	"Cidade Elétrica" (feat. Daniela Mercury)	Jorge Zarath; Manno Góes	3:14
9.	"Dyer Maker / A Camisa E O Botão"	Robert Plant; Jimmy Page; Jauperi; Tenisson Del Rey	4:27
10.	"Horizonte"	Tito	4:14
11.	"Arriba (Xenhenhém)"	Luciano Pinto; Alan Moraes; Durval Luz; Nino Balla; Claudia Leitte	3:14
12.	"Beijar na Boca"	Blanch; Roger Tom	3:06
13.	"Rock Tribal"	Alain Tavares; Gilson Babilônia	2:47
14.	"Pensando em Você"	Henrique Cerqueira	5:20
15.	"Fogo & Paixão" (feat. Wando)	Rose	3:15
16.	"Quem É De Fé Balança"	Sérgio Rocha; Zeca Brasileiro; Adson Tapajós	2:57
17.	"Pássaros"	Mikael Mutti	3:37
18.	"Eu Grito"	Luciano Pinto; Alain Tavares; Durval Luz; Nino Balla; Claudia Leitte	4:27
Total length:			68:00

=== DVD ===
DVD – Disc 1
No.	Title	Length
1.	"Exttravasa" (Extravasa / Rap Incidental) (feat. Gabriel o Pensador)
2.	"Rock Tribal"
3.	"Fulano in Sala"
4.	"Quem é de Fé Balança"
5.	"Beijar na Boca"
6.	"Dyer Maker / A Camisa e o Botão"
7.	"Cidade Elétrica" (feat. Daniela Mercury)
8.	"Doce Paixão"
9.	"No Carnaval de Salvador"
10.	"Eu Fico / Amor à Prova / Janeiro a Janeiro"
11.	"Bola de Sabão" (feat. Badauí)
12.	"Pássaros"
13.	"Pensando em Você"
14.	"Horizonte"
15.	"Lirirrixa"
16.	"Busy Man (Sem Você)" (feat. Carlinhos Brown)
17.	"Eu Grito"
18.	"Fogo & Paixão" (feat. Wando)
19.	"Arriba (Xenhenhém)"
20.	"Cai Fora / Foto na Estante / Banho de Chuva"
21.	"Me Chama de Amor"
22.	"Insolação do Coração"
Total length:		87:00

DVD – Disc 1 bonus feature
No.	Title	Length
1.	"Making of"
2.	"Beijar na Boca" (Music Video)
3.	"Exttravasa" (Music Video)

DVD – Disc 2
No.	Title	Length
1.	"Meu Nome é Claudia Leitte" (Documentary)

== Extended play ==
Ao Vivo em Copacabana: Músicas Extraídas do DVD (English: Live in Copacabana: Songs from DVD) is the first extended play by Claudia Leitte, released on September 5, 2008. Contains four songs that are present on the DVD that are not on the CD track listing.

Ao Vivo em Copacabana: Músicas Extraídas do DVD

EP by Claudia Leitte
- Released: September 5, 2010
- Recorded: February 17, 2008
- Genre: Axé
- Length: 14:39
- Languages: Portuguese, english
- Label: Universal
- Producers: Sérgio Rocha; Robson Nonato

Track listing
No.	Title	Writer(s)	Length
1.	"Fulano in Sala"	Sérgio Rocha; Adson Tapajós; Zeca Brasileiro	3:42
2.	"Eu Fico / Amor à Prova / Janeiro a Janeiro"	Claudia Leitte; Sérgio Rocha; Luciano Pinto; Zeca Brasileiro; Adson Tapajós; Zezito Doceiro	4:23
3.	"Lirirrixa"	Sérgio Rocha; Claudia Leitte; Luciano Pinto	3:25
4.	"Me Chama de Amor"	Alexandre Peixe; Beto Garrido	3:49
Total length:			14:39

== Charts ==
=== Weekly charts ===
Chart (2008)	Peak position
Brazilian Albums (ABPD)	1
Brazilian Video Albums (ABPD)	1

=== Year-end charts ===
Chart (2008)	Peak position
Brazilian Albums Chart	18
Brazilian Video Albums Chart	6

== Certifications ==
Region	Certification	Certified units/sales
Brazil (Pro-Música Brasil) CD	Gold	50,000^{*}
Brazil (Pro-Música Brasil) DVD	3× Platinum	500,000
^{*} Sales figures based on certification alone.

== Release history ==
Country	Date	Format	Label
Brazil	July 27, 2008	CD	Universal Music
Brazil	June 30, 2008	digital download	Universal Music
Brazil	August 11, 2008	DVD	Universal Music
Portugal	August 11, 2008	digital download	Universal Music
Japan	August 24, 2008	CD	Universal Music
United States	September 2, 2008	DVD	Universal Music
World	September 5, 2008	Extended play	Universal Music
Brazil	2009	CD (digipack edition); DVD (one disc digipack edition)	Universal Music
Brazil	February 13, 2013	digital download (video)	Universal Music
