= Billionaire (song) =

2010 single by Travie McCoy featuring Bruno Mars

Single by Travie McCoy featuring Bruno Mars

from the album Lazarus
- Released: March 9, 2010
- Recorded: 2009
- Genre: Reggae; pop rap
- Length: 3:29 (album version); 3:06 (radio edit)
- Label: Fueled by Ramen
- Songwriters: Travie McCoy; Bruno Mars; Philip Lawrence; Ari Levine
- Producer: The Smeezingtons

Travie McCoy singles chronology
"Differently" (2009)	"Billionaire" (2010)	"Need You" (2010)

Bruno Mars singles chronology
"Nothin' on You" (2009)	"Billionaire" (2010)	"Just the Way You Are" (2010)

Music video
- "Billionaire" on YouTube

"Billionaire" is a song by American rapper Travie McCoy from his debut studio album, Lazarus (2010), featuring vocals by American singer-songwriter Bruno Mars. It was first released on March 9, 2010, in various countries via digital download as the album's lead single by Fueled by Ramen. McCoy co-wrote the song with its producers Mars, Philip Lawrence and Ari Levine of the Smeezingtons. The song was created from a melody hummed by Mars and Lawrence. The lyrics were written during an eleven-day trip Mars and Levine made to London to work on a record, supported by Mars's label.

"Billionaire" is a reggae and pop-rap song. Critical reception towards the song was mixed, as music critics praised the song's style comparing it to the music of Sublime, Jason Mraz and Jack Johnson, but criticized its songwriting. Lyrically, the hook is money-driven with political elements in the verses. Such elements include helping those in need, having a show like Oprah and being on the cover of Forbes magazine. The single reached number one in Israel and the Netherlands, number two in Ireland and New Zealand, and also reached the top five in the United Kingdom and the United States. It was certified four-times platinum by the Recording Industry Association of America (RIAA), triple platinum by Recorded Music NZ (RMNZ), twice by the Australian Recording Industry Association (ARIA), Music Canada (MC) and British Phonographic Industry (BPI).

The accompanying music video for "Billionaire", directed by Mark Staubach, was filmed at various locations in Los Angeles, California. The video is interpolated with footage of McCoy driving a Mini Cooper with Mars in the passenger seat. Mars and McCoy, with Fall Out Boy's Pete Wentz on the back, are shown riding different scooters. McCoy is also seen helping four people, as well as a large group at the end. McCoy and Mars performed the song live on Jay Leno's The Tonight Show and Late Night with Jimmy Fallon. It was also part of Mars's Super Bowl XLVIII halftime show in 2014. The song was re-recorded by Brazilian singer Claudia Leitte; her version outperformed the original single reaching number three on the Billboard Brazil Hot 100 Airplay chart. The television show soundtracks of Beavis and Butt-Head and American Housewife used the song.

== Background and development ==
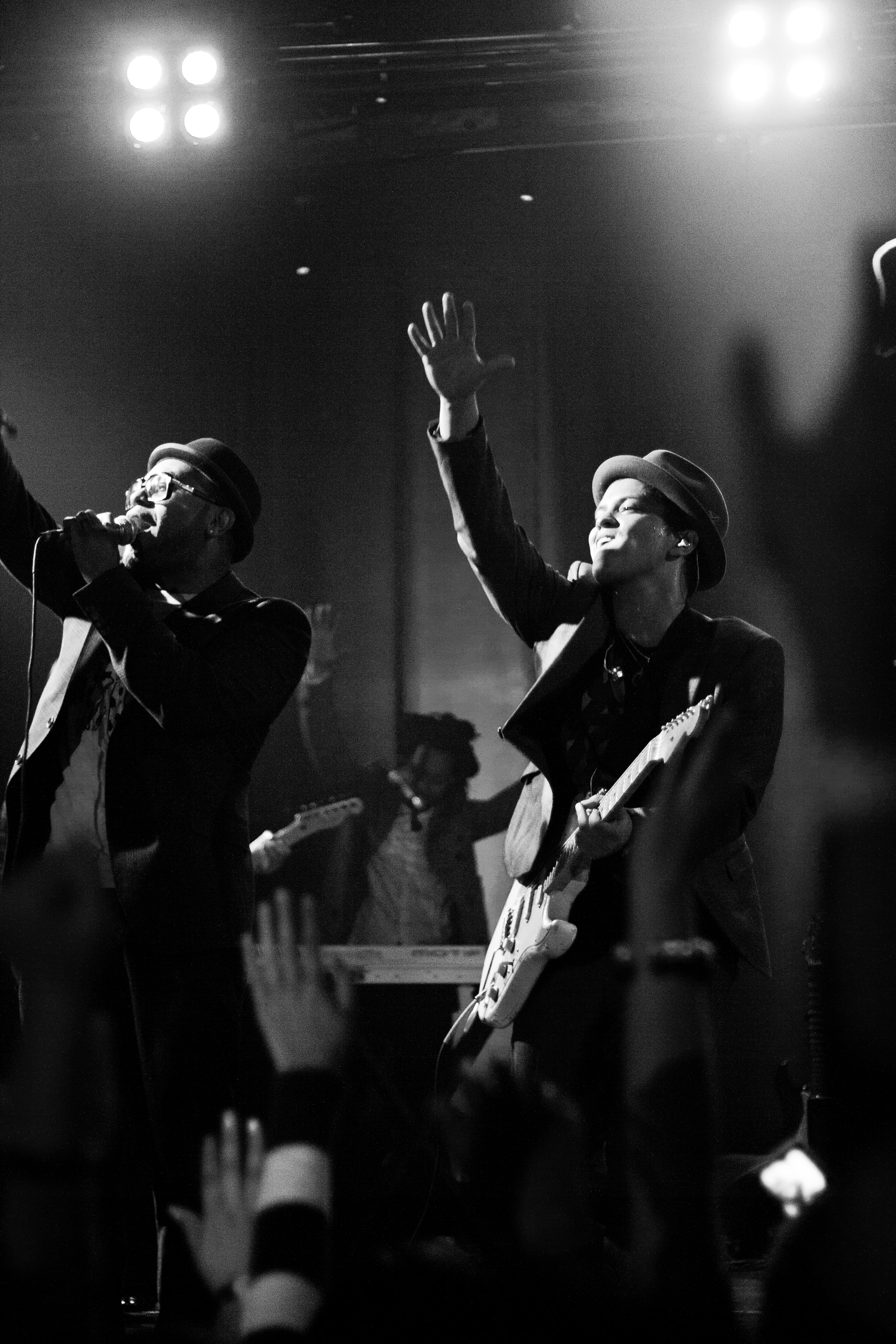
Lawrence (left) and Mars (right) developed the melody of the song in 2009.

During the summer of 2009, the Smeezingtons, consisting of Bruno Mars, Philip Lawrence and Ari Levine, were booked for a week of writing sessions for Lupe Fiasco, B.o.B and Travie McCoy. The first song the team worked on and recorded with McCoy was "One at a Time", released as a charity single for MTV's Staying Alive Foundation. Mars and Lawrence usually hummed melodies, while Aaron Bay-Schuck, former Atlantic Records A&R rep, encouraged them to develop the best of those, such as "Nothin' on You" and "Billionaire". In the beginning, they had only "scratch chorus demos of "Nothin' On You" and "Billionaire", with a guitar on the backing track and Mars singing on top of it. It was the first song McCoy began to work on after abandoning the original material for his album.

Mars came up with the lyrical concept for "Billionaire" during a trip to London, to work on a record. He and Ari Levine were each given £240 ($350) by Mars's record label to live on for eleven days. Mars found the amount of money to be insufficient, and explained, "We were like, 'Is this the biggest mistake we've ever made? We thought we were broke in California; what are we going to do here?' So we've got no money, and I'm walking the streets and came up with, 'I wanna be a billionaire, so frickin' bad'". Mars also claimed that his own finances inspired him to write the track, "I wouldn't have to worry about, you know, I can't afford to get breakfast, so I'll wait until lunchtime to eat".

When Mars first showed McCoy the hook, the latter decided to decline the collaboration, saying to him: "Dude, we're in a recession right now. I'm gonna get crucified". Nevertheless, when McCoy later returned home, he realized the track "had potential". From then on, the rapper began writing his verses with "goofy humor and flashes of political conscience" that "counterbalanced the hook's materialism". McCoy claimed he "made it more relatable". McCoy intended to avoid "superficial" lyrics in the song in the wake of an economic recession, and added, "There's something to sing about here; if I was in the position to have a ridiculous amount of money, would I be selfish or selfless?' I just took that concept and ran with it".

According to Mars, he and McCoy "came up" with the song after listening to The Beatles' "Can't Buy Me Love". Mars was not supposed to feature on the hook of "Billionaire", however, his "charisma" when he sang it prompted McCoy and the label to keep his vocal after the final version was recorded. In a 2025 interview, McCoy stated that he had to push to keep Mars on the track, despite the label's hesitations. He revealed that the original "Billionaire" demo the Smeezingtons brought to him included the lyric "standing next to Diddy and the Queen", but he asked Mars to change it to Oprah, saying he "[didn't] want to sing Diddy's name every night", and Mars agreed.

On January 28, 2014, Demetrius Proctor filed a lawsuit, claiming to hold the copyright for "Billionaire". Proctor alleged he has owned the copyright to the track's music and lyrics since March 31, 2011, though the song was released a year before. As evidence, he submitted a United States Copyright Office registration certificate for Frisky Vol. 1 to 30 (Tapes), issued in 2000. In the suit, Proctor accused McCoy and Mars of "willful and intentional" infringement of copyright, and sought the destruction of all copies of the recording. Proctor claimed he has exclusive rights to reproduce and distribute the song. On November 5, 2020 the case was dismissed, without prejudice, since Proctor failure to prosecute.

== Production and release ==
"Billionaire" was co-written by McCoy, Mars, Lawrence and Levine. The Smeezingtons were responsible for the music, production and played all the instruments on the track but the bass. It was played by Brody Brown and Charles Monez. Levine recorded and mixed the song at Levcon Studios, in Hollywood, California. Eric Hernandez played the live drums, while the drums were programmed by The Stereotypes. It was mastered by Chris Gehringer at Sterling Sound, in New York.

"Billionaire" was first released by Fueled By Ramen via digital download in various countries on March 9, 2010. The single was serviced to U.S. contemporary hit radio on March 9, 2010, by Fueled By Ramen and RRP. On July 23, 2010, Fueled By Ramen released the Billionaire – EP that featured the single, "Bad All By Myself" as a bonus track alongside "Superbad (11:34)". Three days later, "Billionaire" was released in the United Kingdom via digital download. On September 3, 2010, the CD single version with "Billionaire" and the bonus track, "Bad All By Myself", was released in Austria, Germany, and Switzerland by Fueled By Ramen and DecayDance. On September 21, 2010, Fueled By Ramen released a deluxe single edition for digital download which contained "Billionaire", an acoustic version of the song, and the music video for it. A radio cut of the song, which replaces the word "fucking" with "freaking" and is 3:06 long instead of 3:30 was released. The track was also included on Mars's first compilation album, Collaborations (2026).

== Composition ==
"Billionaire"
"Billionaire" begins with an acoustic guitar, evolving into a reggae sound. Its musical style was compared to Sublime and Jason Mraz

"Billionaire" is an acoustic reggae and pop-rap song. It has a "laid-back ... island feel", evolving into a "reggae-tinged" beat with an acoustic guitar. Gregory Heaney of AllMusic compared the song to the works of Sublime, while Digital Spy's Nick Levine compared it to No Doubt's "Underneath It All" (2002). Rodrigo Perez of MTV News wrote the song reminded him of a fusion between Sublime, Common and Jason Mraz. MTV News' Tamar Anitai thought the song gave her a Jason Mraz, Jack Johnson and Shwayze's "Corona and Lime" (2008) summer vibe. James Montgomery felt the same way, dubbing it as "sunny, shiny, breezy and blissed-out". Mars's singing style was compared to Jack Johnson. "Billionaire" was composed in the key of A major at a tempo of 80 beats per minute.

Lyrically, the chorus of the song is materialistic, money-driven—"I wanna be a billionaire so fucking bad"—with amusing and political verses counterbalancing it. The songwriting concerns the lifestyle that McCoy and Mars would have with such money, including the fashion, luxury, "shoulder-rubbing", and influence. It details and outlines McCoy's wish list for when he becomes a billionaire. He fantasizes about success, helping after Hurricane Katrina, having a show like Oprah Winfrey, meeting The Queen and adopting unfortunate children. On the other hand, Mars expresses interest in having his name "in shining lights" and appearing on the cover of Forbes magazine. Sharyar Rizvi of the Dallas Observer compared the lyrics of "Billionaire" to those of Nas' "If I Ruled the World (Imagine That)" (1996) and Barenaked Ladies' "If I Had $1000000" (1992). McCoy said "Billionaire" is an update on George Barr McCutcheon's novel Brewster's Millions (1903) with him giving out money and "fulfilling" desires.

== Critical reception ==
"Billionaire" received mixed reviews from music critics. Nick Levine of Digital Spy rated the song four out of five stars, dubbing it a "summer pop treat so sweet and tasty it's even possible to forgive McCoy's slightly irritating change of billing". James Montgomery of MTV News enjoyed the track, commenting that it "is perfect for the sunshine" and raises spirits to become a "summertime smash". USA Today's Jerry Shriver praised the single, finding it "hilarious". Fraser McAlpine from BBC Chart Blog gave the single four stars. He commented that the track is "optimistic" and cheerful, with a positive message of "hope and generosity". Nevertheless, McAlpine criticized the use of explicit language, calling it "a little ripe for genteel ears".

In a mixed review, Billboard's Melanie Bertoldi awarded it three-and-a-half stars out of five, saying that the song's lyrics "may be inconsistent, but the beat still goes down smoothly". Rodrigo Perez of MTV News praised the song's instrumentation but criticized its lyrics, calling them a "laundry list of wishes". The New York Times's Jon Caramanica said the song has a "moody underbelly", complementing its "stirring hook", also noting that McCoy takes a "quick potshot" at his ex Katy Perry in one of the verses.

In a negative review, Mike Diver of BBC dubbed the reggae stylings of "Billionaire" as "horribly dated". Likewise, Sharyar Rizvi of the Dallas Observer heavily criticized the song's lyrics saying they, "sound a bit like other songs that explain what the musician would do if they had a bunch of money or ruled the world". Rizvi added that she would like to see McCoy to do some philanthropic work as he promised in the song. At the 2011 ASCAP Pop Music Awards, "Billionaire" was one of the winners of Most Performed Songs. It earned a nomination for Choice Music: Summer Song at the 2010 Teen Choice Awards.

== Commercial performance ==
In the United States, "Billionaire" debuted at number 92 on the Billboard Hot 100 for the issue dated April 17, 2010. On the week of June 26, 2010, the single reached its peak position of number four on the Billboard Hot 100. It became McCoy's highest-charting single as a solo artist. It peaked at number five on the Billboard Rhythmic chart, at number three on the Mainstream Top 40 chart and at number nine on the Billboard Hot Rap Songs chart. "Billionaire" peaked at number 12 on the Canadian Hot 100 on the week of July 31, 2010. The Recording Industry Association of America (RIAA) certified the single four times platinum, while Music Canada (MC) certified it two times platinum. As of September 2012, "Billionaire" has sold 3,272,000 copies in the United States.

"Billionaire" entered the New Zealand Singles Chart at number 40 and peaked at number two, spending 24 weeks on the chart. It has received a triple platinum certification by Recorded Music New Zealand (RMNZ), for selling over 15,000 copies. In Australia, the single debuted at number 35 on the Australian Recording Industry Association (ARIA) chart and peaked at number five. The recording has been certified two times platinum by ARIA, with 140,000 copies sold. It reached number five on Hungary's Rádiós Top 40 chart. The Claudia Leitte version of the song peaked at number three on Brazil Hot 100 Airplay chart, while the original was only able to peak at 93.

In the United Kingdom, the song debuted and peaked at number three on the UK Singles Chart on August 1, 2010. The British Phonographic Industry (BPI) certified "Billionaire" double platinum for sales and streaming figures of 1,200,000 units. In the Republic of Ireland, the single also debuted at its peak position, entering at number two on the Irish Singles Chart. The song reached the top ten in Denmark, peaking at number eight, as well as in Poland and Romania, peaking at number two and eight, respectively. In the Netherlands, "Billionaire" peaked at number four on the Single Top 100 and at number one on the Dutch Top 40 for the week ending August 28, 2010. The song reached the top twenty in Belgium, peaking at number 18, as well as number 11 and 16 in Norway and Germany, respectively.

== Music video ==
The accompanying music video for "Billionaire" was directed by Mark Staubach, and filmed at various Los Angeles, California, locations. It was first broadcast on MTV on May 6, 2010. The visual opens with Mars playing a guitar and singing the opening chorus while sitting at a lifeguard station at Venice Beach. The scene switches to McCoy rapping while driving a Mini Cooper with Mars in the passenger seat. The video shows McCoy helping four people and a large group at the end. He is seen replacing a man's broken skateboard, buying an aspiring artist's CD, giving the keys of a Mini Cooper to a teenager trying to hitchhike to Geneva, New York, and giving a graffiti artist more spray paint after he runs out. The video location then switches to Venice Beach. A group runs out of beer, but McCoy and Mars arrive and hand out more beers to restore life to the party. Mars and McCoy, with Fall Out Boy's Pete Wentz on the back, ride different scooters.

=== Reception ===
Robbie Daw of Idolator opined that if the song was a hit perhaps they could "wear bird suits with Miley Cyrus" on her "Can't Be Tamed" clip. MTV News's James Montgomery dubbed the video as a "fantasy ride in which McCoy helps out", calling it a "lighthearted romp". Writing for the same publication, Tamar Aitai criticized the fact that McCoy tries to be like Kevin Spacey by "paying it forward by helping out his fellow bros", referring to Spacey's film Pay It Forward (2000).

== Live performances ==
"Billionaire" was first performed live by McCoy and Mars, wearing suits, on Jay Leno's The Tonight Show on June 15, 2010, and later that month on the Late Night with Jimmy Fallon. On July 21, 2010, both performers sang the track on Lopez Tonight. McCoy performed the song on BBC Radio 1 Live Lounge on July 27, 2010. On August 8, 2010, McCoy and Mars performed "Billionaire" live at the 2010 Teen Choice Awards. On October 19, 2010, Mars performed an acoustic version of the song on The Kidd Kraddick Morning Show.

In 2011, McCoy and Mars performed "Billionaire" on their European co-headlining tour; McCoy sang it during his headlining leg in North America. That same year, it was also sung during the Vans Warped Tour, where McCoy's band, Gym Class Heroes, were the headline act. On Mars's debut international tour (2010–12) and the Hooligans in Wondaland Tour (2011), he performed a rock cover of "Money (That's What I Want)" (1959) by Barrett Strong. This served as an interlude before "Billionaire". During his second tour, The Moonshine Jungle Tour (2013–14), and on his debut concert residency, Bruno Mars at The Chelsea, Las Vegas (2013–15), Mars sung a cover of "Money (That's What I Want)" with "Billionaire" and Aloe Blacc's "I Need a Dollar" (2010). "Billionaire" was used as the introduction to Mars's performance on the Super Bowl XLVIII halftime show in 2014, sung by a children's choir. It was included on several shows of the South America during Mars's third world tour, the 24K Magic World Tour (2017–18). The singer also sung it during shows of Bruno Mars Live (2022–2024).

== Use in other media ==
The song was covered on the television show Glee during the second-season premiere episode "Audition" (2010). It debuted and peaked at number 28 and 24 on the Billboard Hot 100 and Canadian Hot 100, respectively. Two remixes were released, the first featured T-Pain and Gucci Mane, while the second is titled "Billionaire" (Party Remix), featuring Mars, LMFAO and Mane. UK rapper Professor Green covered the song on BBC Radio 1 in 2010. In 2011, Only Won released a "Geeked out" remix video, titled I Wanna Be An Engineer, which was a parody that reached viral status and caught the attention of CNN, the Discovery Channel, and Intel. The music video and song appeared in MTV's animated series Beavis and Butt-Head (1993) in the 2011 episode "Whorehouse"/"Going Down".

Brazilian singer Claudia Leitte recorded a version of the song titled "Famosa" (English: Famous) featuring McCoy. The stylized title features a dollar sign and S.A., which generally designates corporations. It consists of the same lines originally performed by McCoy while Leitte adds new verses in Portuguese, replacing those of Mars. Its new lyrics refer the Jô Soares' talk show, the reality show Big Brother Brasil, the social network Twitter and the late TV hostess Hebe Camargo. The track was released on May 7, 2010, as the lead single from the album As Máscaras (2010). "Famosa" features additional production by Robson Nonato, along with the original by the Smeezingtons. Leitte released an accompanying music video for the song shot in São Paulo. It features footage of McCoy from the original "Billionaire" music video interpolated with scenes of Leitte portraying a character who must choose between fame and love. The famous Oscar Freire street, known to contain numerous sophisticated stores frequented by artists and millionaires, is heavily featured.

== Formats and track listing ==
Digital download
No.	Title	Length
1.	"Billionaire" (featuring Bruno Mars)	3:29

Digital download
No.	Title	Length
1.	"Billionaire (radio edit)" (featuring Bruno Mars)	3:06

Digital download – Billionaire EP
No.	Title	Length
1.	"Billionaire" (featuring Bruno Mars)	3:29
2.	"Bad All By Myself"	3:24
3.	"Superbad (11:34)"	3:12

Digital download – Deluxe single
No.	Title	Length
1.	"Billionaire" (featuring Bruno Mars)	3:29
2.	"Billionaire (Acoustic)" (featuring Bruno Mars)	3:32
3.	"Billionaire (Music Video)" (featuring Bruno Mars)	3:34

CD single
No.	Title	Length
1.	"Billionaire" (featuring Bruno Mars)	3:29
2.	"Bad All By Myself"	3:24

== Personnel ==
Credits adapted from the liner notes of Lazarus.

- Travie McCoy – lead vocals, songwriting
- Bruno Mars – lead vocals, songwriting
- Philip Lawrence – songwriting
- Ari Levine – songwriting, recording, mixing
- The Smeezingtons – production, music, instrumentation
- The Stereotypes – drum programming
- Eric Hernandez – live drums
- Brody Brown – bass
- Charles Monez – bass
- Chris Gehringer – mastering

== Charts ==
=== Weekly charts ===
List of chart positions
Chart (2010)	Peak position
Australia (ARIA)	5
Austria (Ö3 Austria Top 40)	11
Belgium (Ultratop 50 Flanders)	18
Belgium (Ultratip Bubbling Under Wallonia)	3
Brazil Hot 100 Airplay (Billboard)	93
Canada Hot 100 (Billboard)	12
Canada CHR/Top 40 (Billboard)	9
Canada Hot AC (Billboard)	10
Czech Republic Airplay (ČNS IFPI)	24
Denmark (Tracklisten)	8
Germany (GfK)	16
Hungary (Rádiós Top 40)	5
Ireland (IRMA)	2
Israel (Media Forest)	1
Netherlands (Dutch Top 40)	1
Netherlands (Single Top 100)	4
Mexico Ingles Airplay (Billboard)	47
New Zealand (Recorded Music NZ)	2
Norway (VG-lista)	11
Poland Airplay (ZPAV)	2
Portugal Digital Songs Sales (Billboard)	8
Romania (Romanian Top 100)	8
Sweden (Sverigetopplistan)	17
Switzerland (Schweizer Hitparade)	14
UK Singles (Official Charts)	3
UK Hip Hop/R&B (Official Charts)	1
US Billboard Hot 100	4
US Adult Pop Airplay (Billboard)	33
US Dance Airplay (Billboard)	13
US Hot R&B/Hip-Hop Songs (Billboard)	76
US Hot Rap Songs (Billboard)	9
US Latin Pop Airplay (Billboard)	15
US Pop Airplay (Billboard)	3
US Rhythmic Airplay (Billboard)	5

List of chart position
Chart (2025)	Peak position
Romania Airplay (TopHit)	98

=== Weekly charts ===
List of chart position for Claudia Leitte version
Chart (2010)	Peak position
Brazil Hot 100 Airplay (Billboard)	3

List of chart positions for Glee version
Chart (2010)	Peak position
Canada Hot 100 (Billboard)	24
US Billboard Hot 100	28

=== Year-end charts ===
List of chart positions
Chart (2010)	Position
Australia (ARIA)	30
Brazil (Crowley) Claudia Leitte version	52
Canada (Canadian Hot 100)	45
Hungary (Rádiós Top 40)	34
Netherlands (Dutch Top 40)	17
Netherlands (Single Top 100)	32
New Zealand (RIANZ)	13
Romania (Romanian Top 100)	31
Sweden (Sverigetopplistan)	50
UK Singles (Official Charts)	23
US Billboard Hot 100	23
US Hot Rap Songs (Billboard)	31
US Mainstream Top 40 (Billboard)	19
US Rhythmic (Billboard)	26

List of chart position
Chart (2011)	Position
Hungary (Rádiós Top 40)	32

== Certifications ==
List of certifications
Region	Certification	Certified units/sales
Australia (ARIA)	2× Platinum	140,000^{^}
Canada (Music Canada)	2× Platinum	160,000^{*}
Denmark (IFPI Danmark)	Platinum	90,000^{‡}
New Zealand (RMNZ)	3× Platinum	90,000^{‡}
Spain (Promusicae)	Gold	30,000^{‡}
United Kingdom (BPI)	2× Platinum	1,200,000^{‡}
United States (RIAA)	4× Platinum	4,000,000^{‡}
^{*} Sales figures based on certification alone.^{^} Shipments figures based on certification alone.^{‡} Sales+streaming figures based on certification alone.

== Release history ==
List of release history, showing region(s), date(s), format(s) and label(s)
Region	Date	Format	Label	Ref.
Various	March 9, 2010	Digital download	Fueled by Ramen	
United States	March 9, 2010	Contemporary hit radio	Fueled By Ramen; RRP	
United Kingdom	July 23, 2010	Digital download	Fueled By Ramen	
United Kingdom	July 26, 2010	Digital download	Unknown	
Austria	September 3, 2010	CD single	Decaydance; Fueled By Ramen	
Germany	September 3, 2010	CD single	Decaydance; Fueled By Ramen	
Switzerland	September 3, 2010	CD single	Decaydance; Fueled By Ramen	
United States	September 21, 2010	Digital download	Fueled By Ramen	

== See also ==
- List of Dutch Top 40 number-one singles of 2010
- List of number-one R&B hits of 2010 (UK)
