= Edson Gomes =

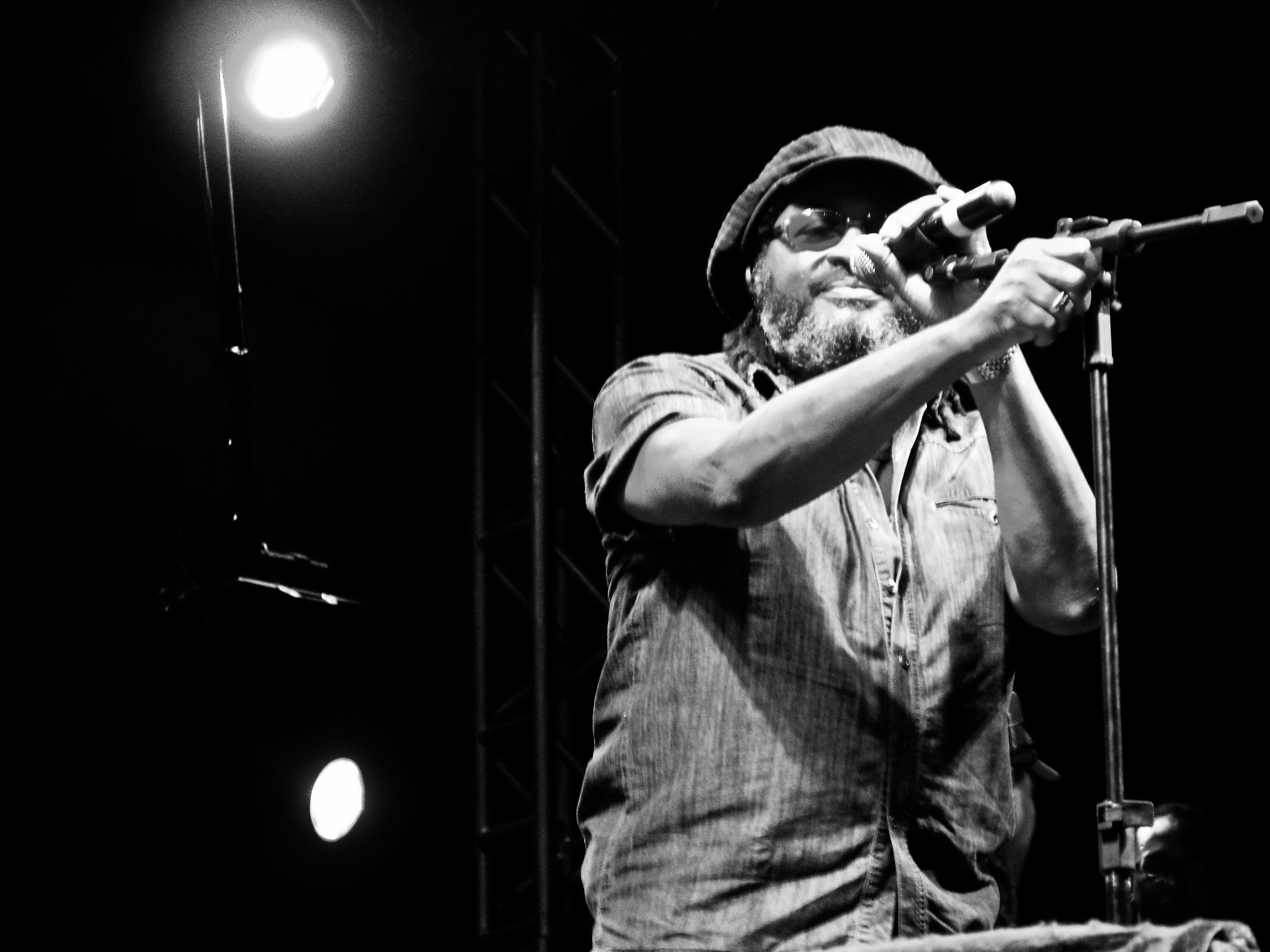
- Edson Gomes, is a Brazilian reggae singer and songwriter.

Background information
- Born: Edson Gomes; September 3, 1955 (age 71)
- Origin: Cachoeira, Bahia, Brazil
- Genre: Reggae
- Occupations: Singer-songwriter, musician
- Instrument: Voice
- Years active: 1982–present

Edson Gomes (born September 3, 1955), is a Brazilian reggae singer and songwriter. Gomes' musical style is heavily influenced by other Roots reggae artists, such as Bob Marley, Peter Tosh and Alpha Blondy.

Edson Gomes is regarded within Brazil as the biggest Brazilian reggae singer in the country, and his career has spanned 50 years.

English interpretations and translations of his music are available on the Roots Reggae Library.

== Discography ==
- Malandrinha
- Árvores
- Na Sombra da Noite
- Campo de Batalha
- Criminalidade
