= As Máscaras =

Studio album by Claudia Leitte
- Released: May 23, 2010
- Recorded: September 2009 – April 2010
- Genre: Pop
- Length: 57:08
- Language: Portuguese, English
- Label: Sony Music
- Producer: Mikael Mutti; Robson Nonato; Deeplick; Miller

Claudia Leitte chronology
Ao Vivo em Copacabana (2010)	As Máscaras (2010)	Negalora: Íntimo (2012)

Singles from As Máscaras
- 1. "As Máscaras (Se Deixa Levar)" Released: October 31, 2009; 2. "Famosa" Released: May 8, 2010; 3. "Don Juan" Released: July 26, 2010; 4. "Água" Released: December 3, 2010; 5. "Trilhos Fortes" Released: April 23, 2011

As Máscaras (English: The Masks) is the debut studio album and by the Brazilian recording artist Claudia Leitte, released on May 23, 2010. The album was nominated to Latin Grammy Award for Best Brazilian Contemporary Pop Album.

== Track listing ==
No.	Title	Writer(s)	Producer(s)	Length
1.	"As Máscaras (Se Deixa Levar)"	Claudia Leitte; Robson Nonato; Tenison Del Rey; Gerson Guimarães; Paulo Vascon	Mikael Mutti; Deeplick	3:22
2.	"Famosa (Billionaire)" (featuring Travie McCoy)	Travis McCoy; Philip Lawrence; Ari Levine; Bruno Mars	The Smeezingtons; Robson Nonato	3:30
3.	"Trilhos Fortes"	Bruno Masi; Adriano Paternostro; Rodrigo Castanho; Betão Aguiar	Nonato	3:54
4.	"Paixão"	Kledir Ramil; Pandorga	Nonato	3:42
5.	"Negou O Nagô"	Chiclete; Mikael Mutti	Mutti	3:56
6.	"Sincera"	Latino	DeepLick; Miller	3:25
7.	"Don Juan" (featuring Belo)	Henrique Cerqueira	Mutti	3:39
8.	"Flores da Favela"	Jauperi	Mutti	3:38
9.	"Água"	Sérgio Rocha; Zeca Brasileiro; Adson Tapajós	DeepLick; Miller	3:35
10.	"Xô Pirua"	Roger Tom	DeepLick; Miller	2:33
11.	"Ruas Encantadas"	Chiclete; Paulo Bass	DeepLick; Miller	2:56
12.	"Faz Um"	Carlinhos Brown; Alain Tavares	Mutti	3:25
13.	"Dum Dum"	Adelmo Casé	Mutti	3:57
14.	"Crime"	Cerqueira	DeepLick; Miller	3:38

== Charts ==
=== Weekly charts ===
Chart (2010)	Peak position
Brazilian Albums (Billboard)	1

== Awards and nominations ==
List of awards and nominations for the album and singles.

Year	Ceremony	Award	Result	Recipient
2010	Latin Grammy	Best Brazilian Contemporary Pop Album	Nominated	As Máscaras
2010	Prêmio Multishow	Best Song	Nominated	As Máscaras (Se Deixa Levar)
2011	Troféu Imprensa	Best Song	Won	Famosa (feat. Travie McCoy)

== Release history ==
Country	Date	Format	Label
Brazil	May 23, 2010	CD	Sony Music
Brazil	June 5, 2010	digital download	Sony Music
