= Little Brazil, Manhattan =

Neighborhood in New York City

Coordinates: 40°45′24″N 73°58′50″W

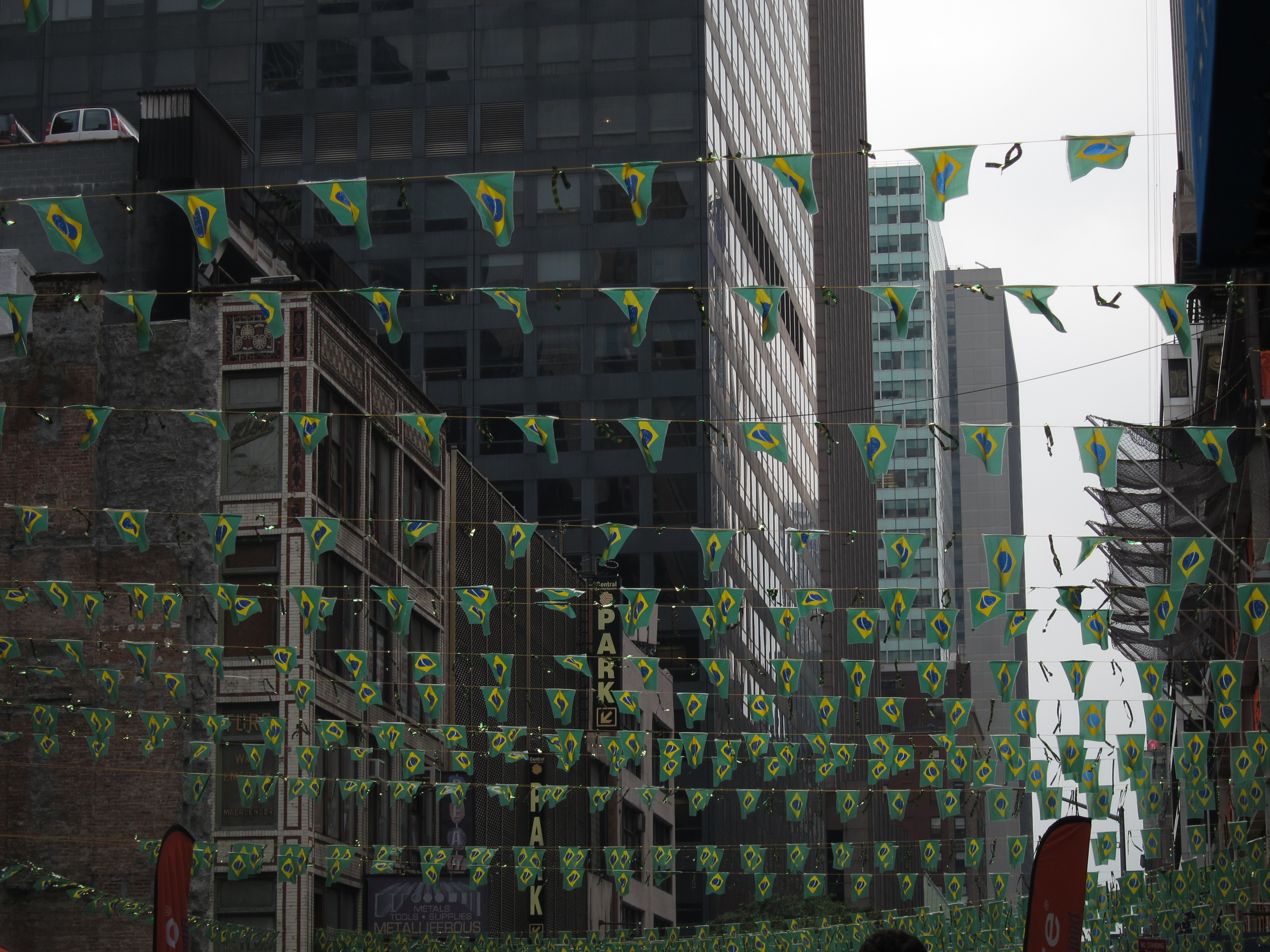
Little Brazil, Manhattan

Little Brazil (Portuguese: Pequeno Brasil) was a small neighborhood in Manhattan, New York City formerly centered on the single block of West 46th Street between Fifth and Sixth Avenues. In the 1960s, the street was home to dozens of Brazilian commercial enterprises and Brazilian restaurants, although only a handful remained in the 2000s. It was demarcated by signs between Fifth Avenue and Seventh Avenue, along 46th Street, and several vendors displayed the green and yellow colors of the Brazilian flag.

Little Brazil was known for hosting New York City's annual Brazilian Day, which features live music and food stands from the various restaurants on the street.

== See also ==
- An Invisible Minority: Brazilians in New York City
- Little Brazil: An Ethnography of Brazilian Immigrants in New York City
