= An Invisible Minority: Brazilians in New York City =

An Invisible Minority: Brazilians in New York City is a 1998 non-fiction book by Maxine L. Margolis, published by Allyn and Bacon as a part of the "New Immigration Series". A 2009 second edition was published by University Press of Florida.

The title refers to the ethnic Brazilian community of New York City, although as of the book's publication, the ethnic group had not organized an actual ethnic neighborhood for themselves.

== Background ==
The author had traveled to Brazil and collected data from people there, as well as from Brazilians who lived in New York City. Other sources used by the author include government documents and anthropological documents.

== Contents ==
The 2009 edition has six chapters. It includes additional research information contained from New York City and from elsewhere, and section on the effects of the September 11 attacks on obtaining a visa.

== Reception ==
Niyi Afolabi of the University of Texas at Austin called the 2009 book edition "cogent".

Robert Elliot Barkan of California State University San Bernardino described the original edition as "one of the more satisfying theoretically-based works."

== See also ==
- Little Brazil, Manhattan
