= Claudia Leitte =

Brazilian singer (born 1980)

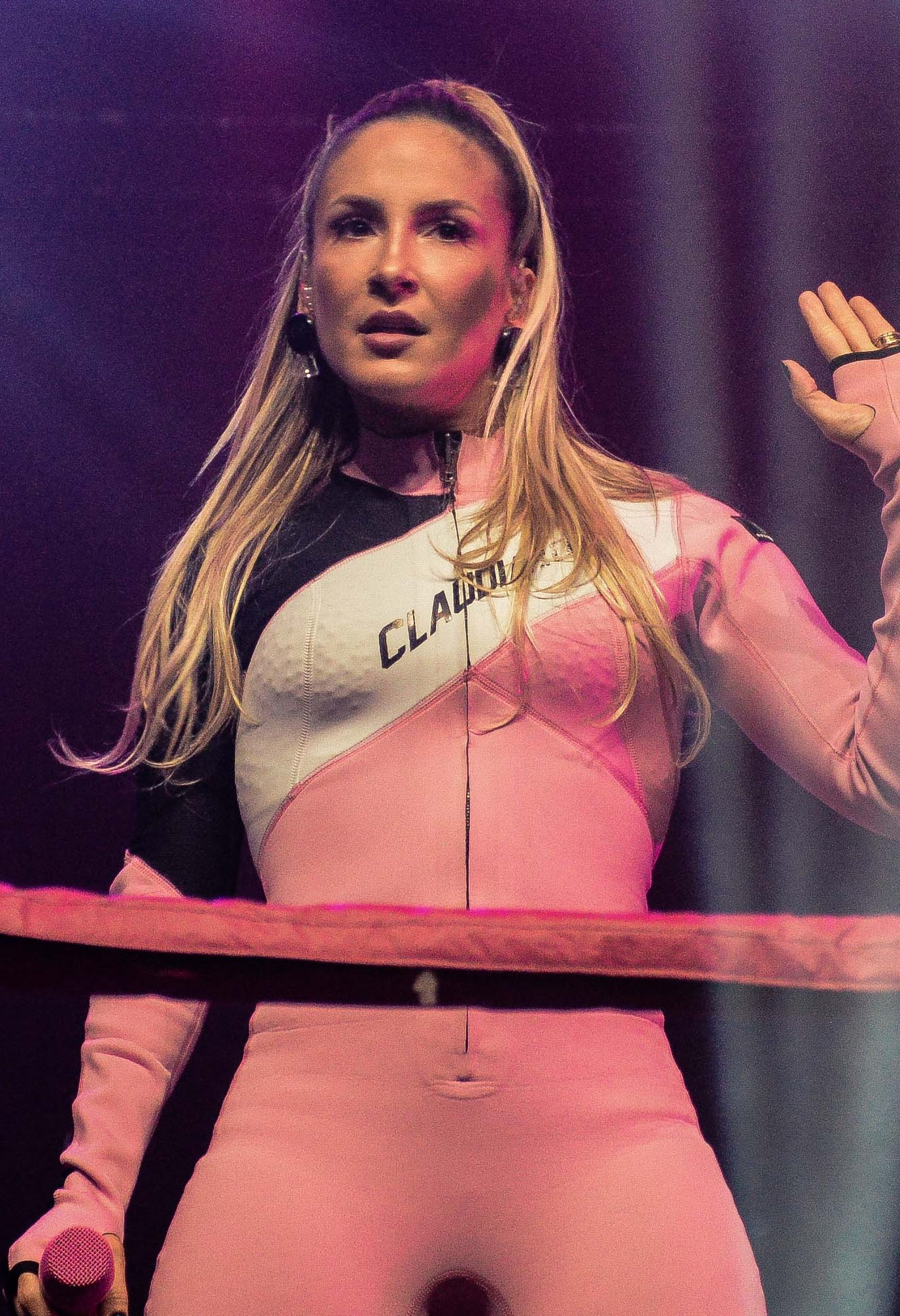
- Leitte in 2021
- Born: Cláudia Cristina Leite Inácio; 10 July 1980 (age 46); São Gonçalo, Rio de Janeiro, Brazil
- Occupations: Singer; television personality
- Years active: 2000–present
- Spouse: Márcio Pedreira (m. 2007)
- Children: 3
- Musical career
- Genres: Axé; Latin pop; pop; reggae; reggaeton; Electronic music
- Labels: Universal; Sony; Som Livre; Roc Nation
- Website: claudialeitte.com

Cláudia Cristina Leite Inácio (Brazilian Portuguese: [ˈklawdʒɐ ˈlejtʃi]; born 10 July 1980) is a Brazilian singer and television personality. She rose to fame in late 2002 as the lead vocalist of the Axé music group Babado Novo. The group achieved a string of consecutive diamond-certified hit singles in Brazil and five golden and platinum albums from 2003 to 2007, as granted by the Brazilian Association of Record Producers (ABPD).

Leitte embarked on a solo career and released her first solo album Ao Vivo em Copacabana (2008), recorded live in front of a crowd of over a million people. The album was awarded gold and triple platinum certifications and established the singer as one of Brazil's greatest stars. The lead single from the album, "Exttravasa", hit number one on the Brazilian charts – becoming one of the best-selling singles of the year along with topping radio airplays. 2010 saw the release of Leitte's first studio album As Máscaras which topped Billboard's Brazilian Albums chart and earned her a Latin Grammy Best Brazilian Contemporary Pop Album nomination. Along with Pitbull and Jennifer Lopez, she recorded "We Are One (Ole Ola)", which served as the official song of the 2014 FIFA World Cup.

With more than 40 million followers on Facebook, Instagram and Twitter combined, she is one of the most powerful and popular female acts in Brazil and Latin America, having sold over 10 million records and being the recipient for many awards including a Latin Grammy and three World Music Awards nominations for 2014 alone. Aside from her musical career, she also served as coach and mentor on the Brazilian version of television show The Voice, The Voice Kids, and The Voice +. On the variations of The Voice she was featured on, Leitte was the winning coach for two seasons.

== Early life ==
Cláudia Cristina Leite Inácio was born in São Gonçalo, Rio de Janeiro, to Ilna Leite and Cláudio Inácio. Her family lived in São Paulo and were visiting São Gonçalo at the time of her birth. Within five days of Leitte being born, her family moved to Salvador, Bahia, her mother's hometown. She has one younger brother, Cláudio Junior.

Leitte got her start working as a kids party entertainer. At that time, she was enrolled in her neighborhood church's religion classes while still in high school. Leitte would often secretly skip church to attend dance and acting classes. Before becoming a full-time professional singer, she tried law school, communications and music at college – only to drop out at a later point. She would go to college in the morning and hit bars and festivals for small singing gigs at night. At first, her family was not very supportive of her artistic desires, but eventually changed their minds after a period of financial crisis in which Leitte's job proved an essential figure to the family's income. Leitte later got her entry in the industry as a backing vocal for local singer Nando Borges.

During the 1990s, she worked in a variety of groups before founding and making a name for herself in Babado Novo, most notably Forró Violeta, Companhia do Pagode and Nata do Samba, where she met guitarist and songwriter Sérgio Rocha, who went on to be the musical director for Babado Novo and much of Leitte's solo career.

== Career ==
=== 2001–2007: Babado Novo ===
After unsuccessful forays into other bands and rhythms, in November 2001 Leitte decided to create a Salvador-based Axé band along with fellow Nata do Samba bandmate Sérgio Rocha. They named it Babado Novo and recruited musicians Buguelo, Alan Moraes, Luciano Pinto, Nino Balla and Durval Luz to join them. They were managed by Cal Adan, who also managed successful group É o Tchan!. Their first indie single, "Cai Fora", was responsible for giving the group the boost it needed, landing them a contract with Universal and Poly Music to release their debut self-titled album in 2003. It earned them their first gold record certification, selling over 500,000 copies up until that year. The album also featured hit singles "Eu Fico", "Canudinho", "Amor à Prova", a version of Roberto Carlos' "Amor Perfeito", a reimagination of Led Zeppelin's "Dyer Maker" and title track "Babado Novo". These songs are considered classics of 2003's Carnival festivities.

On 3 December 2003, the band's second album was released. Titled Sem-vergonha, the album spawned five hit singles: "Safado, Cachorro, Sem-vergonha", "Lirirrixa", "Fulano in Sala", "Falando Sério" and "Uau". The later also served as the lead single for the band's third album and video release Uau! Ao Vivo em Salvador on 21 December 2004. The record sold over 400,000 copies. Later that year, Babado Novo booked shows in the US for the first time, in New Jersey and Massachusetts, before touring in Tokyo, Japan. In 2005, "Doce Desejo" was released as the second single of Uau! Ao Vivo em Salvador, followed by "Caranguejo" and "Me Chama de Amor" as the third and fourth singles.

On 10 December 2005, Babado Novo released "Bola de Sabão", the lead single from their next album. The song reached top positions on the Brazilian charts and in a short time would become the group's most successful song to date. It can be heard during the 2006 Mexican-Brazilian film Only God Knows, starring Alice Braga and Diego Luna. O Diário de Claudinha was the band's first studio album, released on 30 December 2005, and surpassing 120,000 copies sold in its first weeks of sales. The song "Despenteia" was used as part of an advertising campaign for Seda's hair beauty products and "Piriripiti" was chosen as part of television soap Cobras & Lagartos soundtrack. As the album's final single "A Camisa e o Botão" was another hit score for the band. Babado Novo was the headliner of 2006's New York City Brazilian Day, performing live for an audience of 2,5 million people on Times Square.

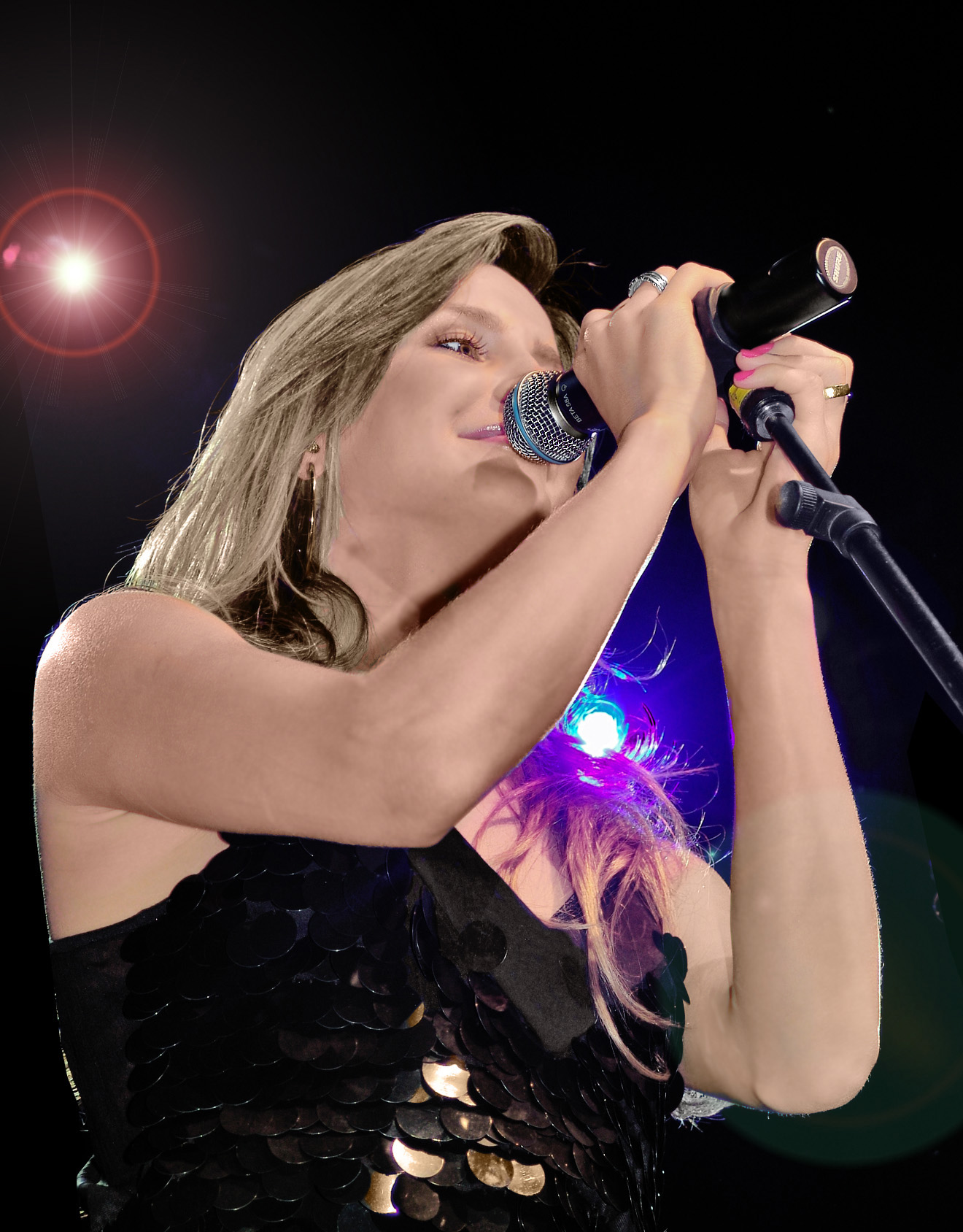
Leitte performing in 2007

January 2007 saw the release of "Insolação do Coração". The song was the first single of the band's fifth and final album Ver-te Mar, which was recorded live in Salvador, Bahia and released on 16 February 2007. "Doce Paixão" and "Pensando em Você" were both released as singles subsequently. Leitte won a VMB award at the 2007 MTV Video Music Brasil for Hottie of the Year.

After selling over 5 million records and spawning many chart-topping hits as part of Babado Novo, Leitte announced in late 2007 that she would be leaving the brand she helped build to become a solo act, bringing her bandmates with her.

=== 2008–2009: Band departure, solo debut Ao Vivo em Copacabana and tours ===
On 18 December 2007, Leitte released her solo debut single "Exttravasa". The song was the most executed song on radio for the year of 2008 and earned her a double diamond record certification, with over a million digital downloads of the song sold. On 5 February 2008, she performed for the last time as a member of Babado Novo. The singer kicked off her solo career with a live concert recording on 17 February 2008, at Copacabana Beach. Gabriel o Pensador, Carlinhos Brown, Badauí, Daniela Mercury and Wando were invited as special guests and were watched and acclaimed by a crowd of almost a million people. On 22 April 2008, the second single from the album, a ballad titled "Pássaros", was released. Leitte released her debut solo album, titled Ao Vivo em Copacabana, on 4 July 2008. On that same day, she embarked on her first official tour as a solo artist: the Exttravasa Tour. The tour had sold out dates through Brazil and Europe, visiting cities like London and Lisbon for 82 shows.

The home video release of Ao Vivo em Copacabana happened on 11 August 2008 and had over 500,000 copies sold. The third single of the album, "Beijar na Boca," was released on 25 November 2008. The fourth and final single of the album, "Horizonte," was released on 24 May 2009. The song was written specially for Leitte by a fan.

During that year, Leitte became the face of hair colour and dye Cor&Ton products for beauty corporation Niely. She also signed an endorsement deal with AmBev to be the spokeswoman for soft drink Guaraná Antarctica, and later, also for SKY Brasil. On 22 November 2009, she released her first fragrance with Jequiti, Elo.

2009 saw Leitte venture into two other smaller tours, the 15-date Beija Eu Tour, which kicked off on 15 March, and the Sette Tour, which went from 2 July 2009 to 22 January 2010, in 47 dates.

=== 2010–2013: As Máscaras, Negalora and The Voice Brasil ===
After inking a deal with Sony Music, Leitte debuted "As Máscaras (Se Deixa Levar)", the lead single from her second album, As Máscaras. In February 2010, Leitte performed with Akon during that year's Salvador Summer Festival. On 10 April 2010, Leitte entered the Guinness Book of World Records for promoting the biggest gathering of kissing people in history. The world record was settled after over 8,372 couples kissed at the same time to the sound of Leitte's "Beijar na Boca" during her 2009 Axé Brasil performance. In that same month, Leitte headlined Miami's Brazilian Day at Bayfront Park, with an audience of over 320,000 people. Following the 8 May release of "Famosa" featuring Travie McCoy (in a new twist of his own song Billionaire), As Máscaras was released on 23 May 2010 and was met with mixed reviews where some music critics noticed her inability at attempting to create her own musical identity and its reggae, dance and pop music influences led to comparisons with Ivete Sangalo. To support the album, Leitte embarked on a 53-date tour named Rhytmos, beginning on 3 July 2010. The record was nominated for a 2010 Latin Grammy Award in the category of Best Brazilian Contemporary Pop Album, but lost out to Sérgio Mendes' Bom Tempo. On 22 October 2010, Leitte released a self-titled fragrance, her second one, later reissued as Claudia Leitte Intense. On 18 December of that year, Leitte charted on Billboard's annual Next Big Sound Music Chart at sixth place.

In May 2011, Leitte was invited by Walt Disney Pictures to voice the character of Carla Veloso, a racing car which Lightning McQueen meets along with Lewis Hamilton at the World Grand Prix opening party in the Brazilian Portuguese release of the motion picture Cars 2. In September 2011, Leitte sang for the first time at the Rock in Rio music festival stage along with Rihanna, Katy Perry and Elton John. That same month she performed "Locomotion Batucada" live at the Miss Universe 2011 pageant, which was held in São Paulo and was broadcast in 190 countries, totaling two billion spectators. She appeared in Ricky Martin's "Samba" for the worldwide repackage of the album Música + Alma + Sexo (2011) and was also featured in its accompanying music video.

In January 2012, Leitte signed a recording contract with Som Livre, ending her partnership with Sony Music, under which she had released one studio album. In May of that same year, she was a guest host for six episodes of GNT's women beauty talk-show Superbonita, filling in for regular host Luana Piovani. Shortly after, she was invited to be a coach on television show The Voice Brasil, along with acclaimed singers Lulu Santos, Daniel and Carlinhos Brown, one of Leitte's frequent collaborators. The show premiered on 23 September 2012.

Leitte released her intimate second live album promptly titled Negalora: Íntimo, on 29 August 2012. Negalora showcased the singer in a different, romantic musical style and she was praised for her ability to reinvent herself without denying her origins. On 13 September 2012 Leitte redeemed her roots and released "Largadinho", the lead single of more of a mainstream record, which was a commercial success and spawned its own English version titled "Lazy Groove" and a new mix featuring Angolan singer Anselmo Ralph. The song peaked at number five on Billboard's World Digital Songs chart. On 13 October 2012, she launched the Sambah Tour, going through Brazil and Europe in 92 dates.

In late 2013, co-founder and CEO of Roc Nation Jay Brown took notice of Leitte and expressed interest in meeting her while in a trip to Africa. Not long after, Leitte hopped on a plane and the meeting resulted in a deal with the label's management team with plans of launching her career overseas.

=== 2014–present: Axemusic, Sette and international endeavors ===
On 14 January 2014, Leitte released her fourth record, Axemusic – Ao Vivo, recorded live during O Maior Show do Mundo festival at Arena Pernambuco, in Recife. The album sold out within hours of its release, reaching platinum with over 123,000 copies sold that year. Among the special guests in the concert shooting were Wesley Safadão, Naldo Benny, Luiz Caldas, Wanessa and Armandinho.

In February 2014, it was reported Leitte had been meeting with producers Shea Taylor, Timbaland, Kuk Harrell, Rob Persaud and Rodney Jerkins. She then began recording English-language songs for her announced crossover album while still touring across South America, writing and producing over 30 songs in that period. She was featured in a version of "La Luz", the main single for Juanes' sixth album Loco de Amor (2014).

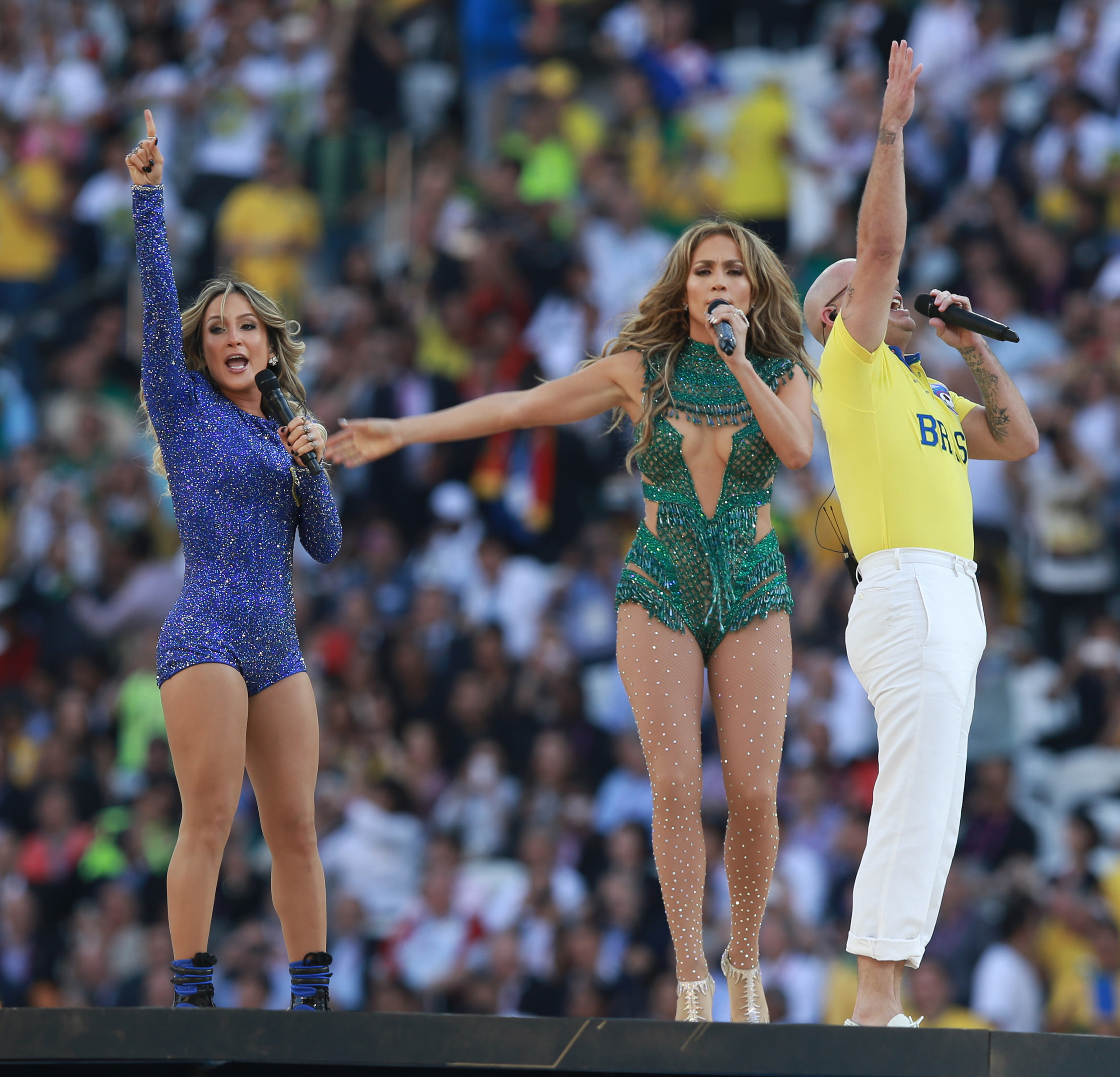
Leitte (left) performing alongside Jennifer Lopez and Pitbull at the 2014 FIFA World Cup opening ceremony

Leitte was approached by Pitbull and FIFA to represent Brazil in the 2014 FIFA World Cup official song along with Jennifer Lopez. The collaboration resulted in "We Are One (Ole Ola)", which sold over 5,6 million copies worldwide and was also featured in Pitbull's seventh album Globalization (2014). The trio performed the song onstage at the 2014 Billboard Music Awards and then during the tournament's opening ceremony on 12 June 2014 at the Arena Corinthians in São Paulo, Brazil, which was preceded by Leitte's solo rendition of Ary Barroso's "Aquarela do Brasil". The performance helped Leitte gain widespread international recognition, and she spent over eight weeks on Billboard's Social 50 worldwide ranking.

In October 2014, Leitte announced that she chose not to renew her contract with Som Livre and revealed she was moving to Los Angeles to continue work on her new record. Later that month she released her first extended play, titled Sette, under her own label, 2Ts Entretenimento, vowing for more creative and commercial freedom. The lead single, "Matimba", was the result of a collaboration between Leitte and rappers Big Sean and MC Guimê. The second, "Cartório", featured singer Luan Santana and was one of the most played songs during Brazil's Carnival festivities in 2015.

On 26 December 2014, Leitte premiered the promotional single "Signs" in an emotional performance during The Voice Brasil's third series finale, marking her first venture into the English-speaking market as a solo pop artist. The song was written by Danny O'Donoghue, Andrew Frampton, Mark Shehan and Stephen Kipner and was featured on the soundtrack for television soap I Love Paraisópolis. A music video directed by Inês Vergara premiered on 31 July 2015. In April 2015, Leitte released her fourth fragrance, Secret. Another song entitled "Shiver Down My Spine", was released exclusively on Tidal on 22 October 2015. It was her first project linked to Roc Nation and also her first English composition, in collaboration with RØMANS. The song was featured in the 2015 sequel for the film S.O.S. Mulheres ao Mar and 2016 soap Haja Coração.

Leitte later released "Corazón" featuring Puerto Rican singer Daddy Yankee on 17 December 2015. The song will reportedly be featured on her upcoming album, which is set to feature tracks in Portuguese, English and Spanish, and is predicted to come out as a series of singles. In January 2016, Leitte announced the release of her fifth fragrance, Chic, which ten months later was followed by her sixth one, titled Glam. A new single, "Taquitá", was released on 11 November 2016 and was promoted through February 2017 during Carnival along with "Eu Gosto", a song from Dennis DJ's Professor da Malandragem (2017). "Baldin de Gelo" came out on 4 August 2017, featuring Spanish and Portuguese lyrics and reggaeton influences, combining everything Leitte learned in Brazil and in the United States in the past years. Both "Taquitá" and "Baldin de Gelo" were certified gold in the country. Upon the conclusion of the fifth season of The Voice Brasil in December 2016, Leitte was replaced by Ivete Sangalo for the sixth season because Leitte was focusing on promoting her new musical efforts. However, Leitte swapped roles with Sangalo and took her seat to serve as a coach during the third season of The Voice Kids, set to begin airing in January 2018. That same month Leitte announced she would be releasing a new single, "Carnaval", featuring American rapper Pitbull, on 26 January 2018.

== Personal life ==
Leitte had a relationship with Jammil e uma Noites bandmember Manno Góes which ended after two years in 2005. Not long after, she met businessman and teenage crush Márcio Pedreira, whom she married on 7 March 2007. Her first child, a boy named Davi Leite Inácio Pedreira, was born on 20 January 2009, in Salvador, Bahia, generating controversy after Leitte got back to work and performed in Carnival only a month after giving birth. The couple welcomed a second child, a son named Rafael, born on 15 August 2012 via C-section. On 3 February 2019, Leitte announced she was pregnant with her third child, a girl named Bela.

== Discography ==
Studio albums

- As Máscaras

EPs

- Sette

Live albums

- Ao Vivo em Copacabana
- Negalora: Íntimo
- Axemusic – Ao Vivo

== Tours ==
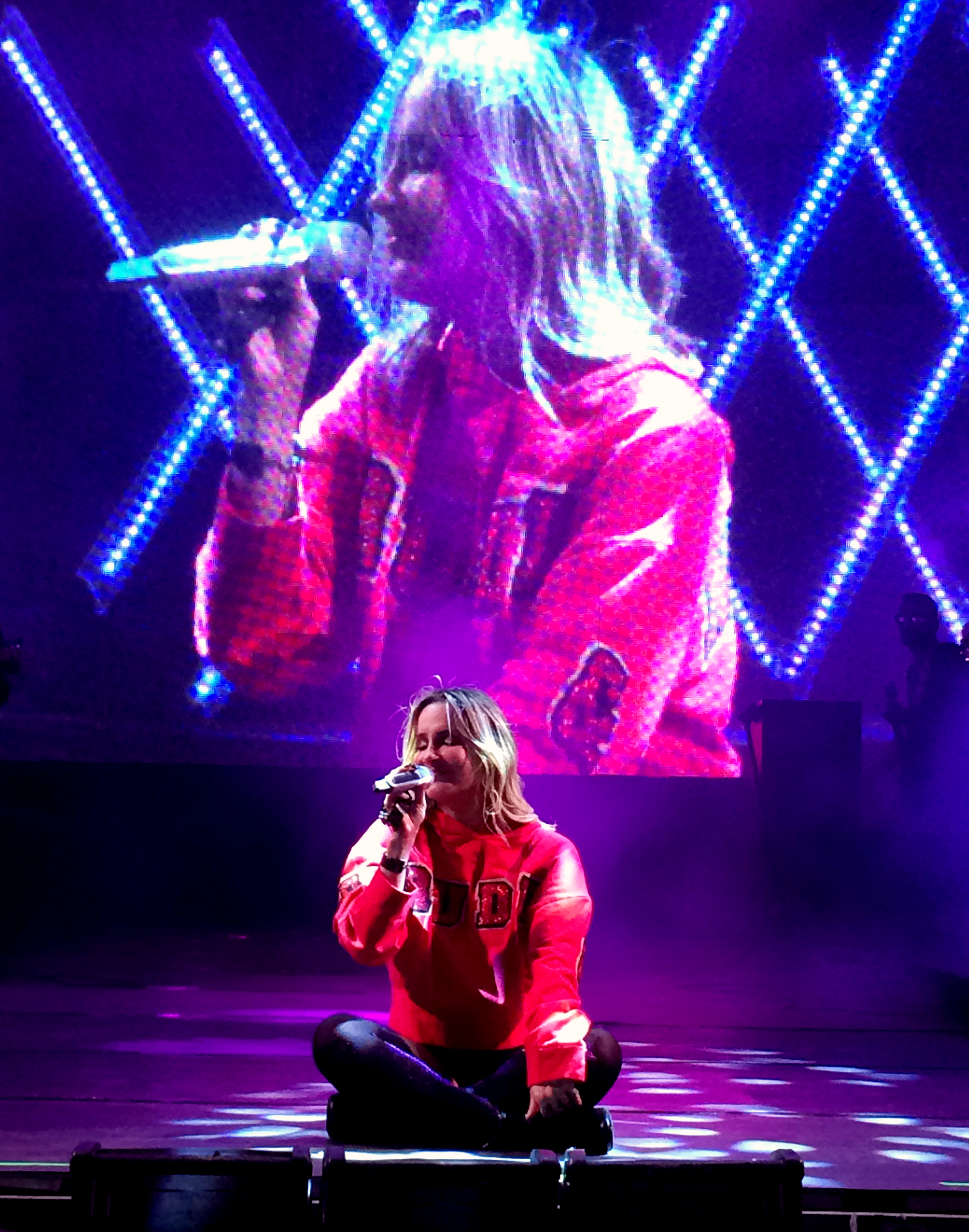
Leitte performing during Corazón Tour, 2016

- Exttravasa Tour (2008–2009)
- Beija Eu Tour (2009)
- Sette Tour (2009–10)
- O Samba Tour (2010)
- Rhytmos Tour (2010)
- Claudia Leitte Tour (2011–12)
- Sambah Tour (2012–13)
- AXEMUSIC Tour (2014)
- Sette2 Tour (2014–16)
- Corazón Tour (2016–17)
- Claudia 10 Tour (2017–)

== Filmography ==
=== Film ===
| Year | Movie | Role | Notes |
|---|---|---|---|
| 2011 | Bahêa Minha Vida | Herself | Documentary about Esporte Clube Bahia |
| 2011 | Cars 2 | Carla Veloso | Voice; Brazilian version |

=== Television ===
| Year | Title | Role | Notes |
|---|---|---|---|
| 2007 | Estúdio Coca-Cola | Herself | 1 episode |
| 2008 | Família MTV | Herself | 1 episode |
| 2009 | Uma Hora de Sucessos | Host | 1 episode |
| 2009 | Malhação | Herself | 3 episodes |
| 2011 | Miss Universe 2011 | Herself | 1 episode |
| 2012 | Superbonita | Herself | 6 episodes |
| 2012–2016, 2021 | The Voice Brasil | Herself / Judge | |
| 2014 | 2014 Billboard Music Awards | Herself | "We Are One (Ole Ola)" performance |
