= Bruno Mars at the Chelsea, Las Vegas =

2013–2015 residency show

- Residency by Bruno Mars
- Promotional poster
- Location: Paradise, Nevada, US
- Venue: The Chelsea, Cosmopolitan of Las Vegas
- Start date: December 29, 2013
- End date: December 31, 2015
- No. of shows: 11
- Attendance: 29,700
- Box office: $4.1 million

Bruno Mars concert chronology
- The Moonshine Jungle Tour (2013–14); Bruno Mars at the Chelsea, Las Vegas (2013–15); Bruno Mars at Park MGM (2016–25)

Bruno Mars at the Chelsea, Las Vegas was the first concert residency at the new concert showroom in the Cosmopolitan of Las Vegas, United States, by American singer and songwriter Bruno Mars, from December 2013 to December 2015. DJ Supra, Havana Brown and DJ Crykit opened some shows of the residency, whilst the setlist, which featured songs from Doo-Wops & Hooligans (2010), Unorthodox Jukebox (2012), and various covers, was performed by Mars, backed by his eight-piece band, The Hooligans. The show ended with Mars performing an encore of "Locked out of Heaven" (2012). It received a positive reception from music critics, who praised the energetic and intimate show. The eleven shows in the concert residency were promoted by C3 Presents. The concert residency grossed $4.1 million, selling 29,700 tickets.

== Background and development ==
On September 24, 2013, Bruno Mars was announced as the first artist to open the new showroom, The Chelsea, which replaced the Chelsea Ballroom, at The Cosmopolitan on December 29, 2013. His performance as the headliner of the Super Bowl XLVIII halftime show led to a rise in demand and increased ticket sales. A week before the latter performance, the Cosmopolitan added two more dates, October 17 and 18, 2014. John Unwin, Chief Executive Office (CEO) of The Cosmopolitan, said, "Bruno Mars is a perfect fit for The Cosmopolitan as he has a natural affinity for Las Vegas and is a true performer". On October 5, 2015, Mars was announced as the performer for the New Year's Eve 2016.

Ticket prices began at $150 for the December 29 and 31, 2013, shows and $95 for the 2014 concerts. The concerts started at 9:00 p.m. and at the New Year's Eve show, Mars counted down and celebrated the midnight hour. Godiva Chocolatier was 2013 New Year's Eve concert sponsor. The concert residency was promoted by C3 Presents. Shaun Hoffman was the tour manager.

== Synopsis ==
The stage had a triangular digital screen which projected various images such as dancing female silhouettes, moving clouds, butterflies, fireworks and others. After the opening act by DJ Supra, Mars, wearing a black blazer, graphic shirt while his bandmates were dressed in suits and suspenders, started by playing an electric guitar. During the concert, Mars and The Hooligans' dance routine featured a "Motown-inspired choreography" and the R&B/pop aesthetic form. Mars occasionally made the audience laugh with small comedic sets. As the show continued, the setlist resembled the one used in the Moonshine Jungle Tour including the energetic performances of "Treasure" and the "Billionaire" medley with Barrett Strong's "Money (That's What I Want)" and the chorus of Aloe Blacc's "I Need a Dollar". He also played "Show Me" with red, yellow and green graphics, which led to another blend between "Our First Time", Ginuwine's "Pony" and "Ignition" by R. Kelly.

The next song on the setlist was "Marry You" which included the use of dancing lights. During the performance of "If I Knew", Mars and Philip Lawrence, The Hooligans' bandleader, harmonized on the track. Next was another blend of covers, The Outfield's "Your Love", "Poison" by Bell Biv DeVoe, Montell Jordan's "This Is How We Do It", "Every Little Step" by Bobby Brown, and Janet Jackson's "That's the Way Love Goes", with other tracks. At this point, a waterfall was displayed on the background screen, with Mars singing TLC's "Waterfalls", while guitarist Phredley Brown rapped Left Eye verses on the track. After these covers, Mars sang his piano ballad "When I Was Your Man" with the audience singing along. He then asked the crowd for suggested songs he performed an infused medley of "Billie Jean" and "Dirty Diana", both by Michael Jackson. Towards the end of the show, the audience's energy was lifted by a performance of "Just the Way You Are". The last song of the setlist, "Locked Out of Heaven", was performed as an encore while golden confetti poured down on the audience. The concert had a run time of two hours and Mars's set was 90 to 105 minutes long.

== Reception ==
Ashley Lee of The Hollywood Reporter said that the concert was "an intimate, action-packed performance of crooning and camaraderie sprinkled with humorous remarks and improvised covers". LV Woman considered that Mars "delivered a brilliant and high-energy" performance. Las Vegas Weekly's Don Chareunsy believed the show "solidified" Mars as "one of the best live performers today. Mars can sing (anything), dance and charm the pants off audience members". In 2026, Billboard reported that Mars 11 shows, at the Chelsea generated a revenue of $4.1 million and sold 29,700 tickets.

== Set list ==
The set list given below was performed on December 29, 2013. The list evolved over the course of the concert residency, and sometimes included other numbers. These included "Gorilla" and a cover of Elvis Presley's "Jailhouse Rock".

1. "Money Make Her Smile"
2. "Treasure"
3. "Money (That's What I Want)" / "Billionaire" / "I Need a Dollar"
4. "Show Me"
5. "Our First Time" / Pony" / "Ignition"
6. "Marry You"
7. "If I Knew" / "It Will Rain"
8. "Runaway Baby"
9. "Your Love" / "Poison" / "This Is How We Do It" / "Every Little Step" / "Let's Talk About Sex" / "Candy Rain" / "That's the Way Love Goes"
10. "Waterfalls"
11. "When I Was Your Man"
12. "Billie Jean" / "Dirty Diana"
13. "Just the Way You Are"

Encore

14. "Locked Out of Heaven"

== Shows ==
List of concerts, showing date, city, venue, opening act, tickets sold, number of available tickets and amount of gross revenue
Date	Opening act	Attendance	Revenue
December 29, 2013	DJ Supra	5,800 / 5,800	$1,062,850
December 31, 2013	DJ Supra	5,800 / 5,800	$1,062,850
February 15, 2014	Havana Brown	6,000 / 6,000	$659,025
February 16, 2014	Havana Brown	6,000 / 6,000	$659,025
May 23, 2014	DJ Supra	2,900 / 5,800	$338,903
May 24, 2014	DJ Supra	2,900 / 5,800	$338,903
August 22, 2014	N/A	5,800 / 5,800	$669,590
August 23, 2014	N/A	5,800 / 5,800	$669,590
October 17, 2014	N/A	5,800 / 5,800	$682,455
October 18, 2014	N/A	5,800 / 5,800	$682,455
December 31, 2015	DJ Crykit	3,426 / 3,426	$686,450
Total		29,726 / 32,626	$3,036,423
