= Super Bowl XLIX halftime show =

2015 live show in Glendale, Arizona

- Part of: Super Bowl XLIX
- Date: February 1, 2015
- Location: Glendale, Arizona
- Venue: University of Phoenix Stadium
- Headliner: Katy Perry
- Special guests: Lenny Kravitz, Missy Elliott, Sun Devil Marching Band
- Sponsor: Pepsi
- Director: Hamish Hamilton
- Producer: Ricky Kirshner

Super Bowl halftime show chronology
XLVIII (2014)	XLIX (2015)	50 (2016)

The Super Bowl XLIX halftime show took place on February 1, 2015, at the University of Phoenix Stadium in Glendale, Arizona, as part of Super Bowl XLIX. It featured American singer Katy Perry, with singer Lenny Kravitz and rapper Missy Elliott as special guests. The halftime show was critically acclaimed, and its broadcast on NBC attracted over 118 million viewers according to Nielsen.

The show won two Primetime Creative Arts Emmy Awards for Outstanding Lighting Design/Lighting Direction for a Variety Special and Outstanding Costumes for a Variety Program or Special. The halftime show was also nominated for Outstanding Short-Format Live-Action Entertainment Program.

== Background ==
In August 2014, it was reported that the National Football League (NFL) had a shortlist of three potential acts for the Super Bowl XLIX halftime show, which were Coldplay, Katy Perry, and Rihanna. However, The Wall Street Journal also reported that league representatives asked representatives of potential acts if they would be willing to provide financial compensation to the NFL in exchange for their appearance, in the form of either an up-front fee, or a cut of revenue from concert performances made following the Super Bowl. While these reports were denied by an NFL spokeswoman, the request had, according to the Journal, received a "chilly" response from those involved.

Fans of "Weird Al" Yankovic launched an unsuccessful campaign to have Yankovic perform the halftime show to promote his album Mandatory Fun. On October 9, 2014, Billboard announced that Katy Perry would perform at halftime, and the NFL confirmed the announcement on November 23, 2014.

== Development ==
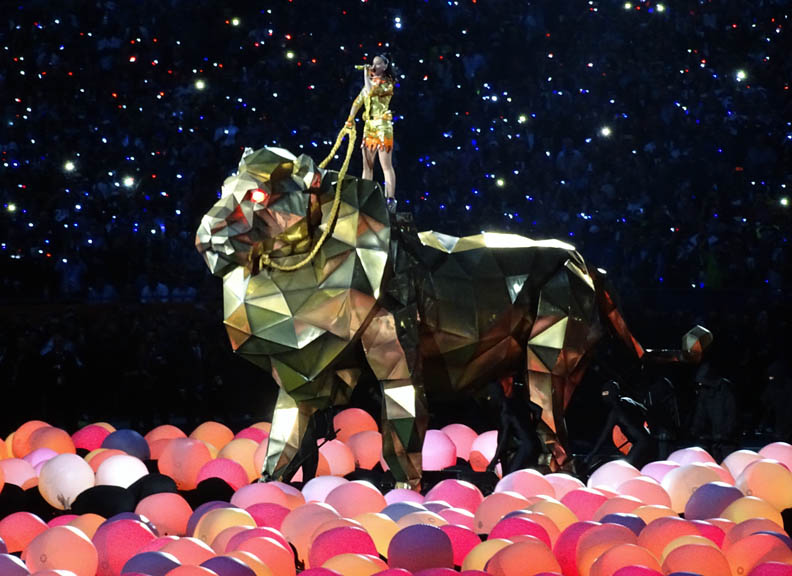
Katy Perry opening the halftime show

On January 10, 2015, Perry announced that Lenny Kravitz would also appear at the halftime show. On January 30, 2015, it was revealed that Missy Elliott, who previously worked with Perry on a remix of "Last Friday Night (T.G.I.F.)", would be an additional performer. Previously, when teasing her female guest performer, Perry revealed: "I wanted to bring someone back, a throwback of sorts", which would create a "female fun night, a bit of old-school". In preparation for her performance, she watched videos of previous halftime show performances by Diana Ross, Beyoncé, Madonna, and Michael Jackson. Having spent months working on the show, Perry wanted it to be "a whole different show" from her Prismatic World Tour, which she was still embarking on. She also met with previous halftime performer Bruno Mars to seek advice on how to prepare for the performance.

The halftime show used high quality video projection and lighting design. GlowMotion Technologies created 616 light globes, which appeared at the beginning of the performance, that were controlled by wireless means. Images were projected over 18,000 square feet on the field.

Working with designer Jeremy Scott, Perry created four separate costumes for her performance. The first was The Flame Dress, which was "inspired by a pair of Adidas shoes with leather flames coming out of them" according to Scott, who said that "We had to think about these looks like Russian Nesting Dolls. Four looks on one performer is really pushing it." The next costume was a California Girls Bikini look. The third look was a sweatshirt dress, which Scott described as being "cute" and "like pajamas". Her final costume was a Moschino Star Gown which he stated was a "full-on red carpet Barbie extravaganza". Perry partook in fashion rehearsals aside from choreography and music rehearsals, as she had to manage wardrobe changes in ten seconds. In October 2014, filming began for a documentary titled Katy Perry: Making of the Pepsi Super Bowl Halftime Show following Perry's preparation for her performance. It was directed by John Hirsch and released on September 12, 2015.

== Synopsis ==
External videos
- Full Super Bowl XLIX halftime show – via the National Football League on YouTube.

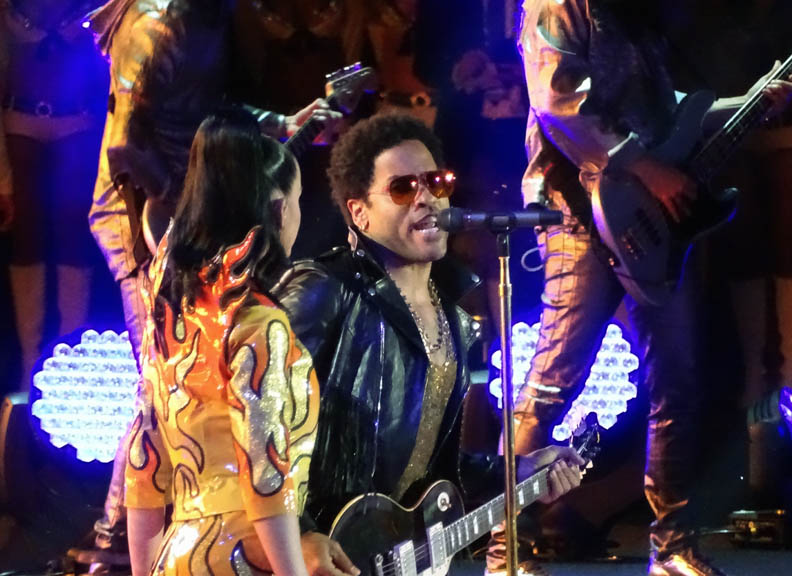
Lenny Kravitz performing with Perry at the halftime show

At the start of the halftime show, on-field participants held up light globes which created a bird's-eye view of Pepsi's logo. Perry entered the stadium riding atop a large, golden mechanical lion, opening her set with a performance of "Roar". She then proceeded to sing "Dark Horse", with 3D rendering on the field creating a chessboard visual where the turf constantly turned into "different shapes and sizes", as acrobats surrounded the singer. Following this, Perry joined Lenny Kravitz for a duet version of "I Kissed a Girl", which included her "rubbing up against" Kravitz and flames exploding behind them. During these three songs, Perry was clothed in a "flame-adorned" dress, with her black hair in a ponytail. The costume has been described as the "clothing equivalent of a flame", and "dress of fire".

The stage and field rendering transitioned into a "breezy" beach setting, with dancers dressed as sharks, palm trees and smiling beach balls dancing around Perry. She underwent a wardrobe change, and progressed into a "campy" medley of "Teenage Dream" and "California Gurls". Rapper Missy Elliott subsequently appeared, performing her songs "Get Ur Freak On" and "Work It", while Perry played "hype-woman" beside her, having now changed once again into a custom black Super Bowl 49 jersey jacket. After Perry briefly disappeared, Elliott performed "Lose Control". Perry returned, now sporting a "star-encrusted gown" for her closing song, "Firework". She rose out of midfield on a narrow platform that was attached to a shooting star prop, and flew above the crowds. During this performance, fireworks exploded around Perry and the stadium. The star that Perry was attached to as she flew around the stadium was said to resemble The More You Know's public service announcements logo.

== Critical reception ==
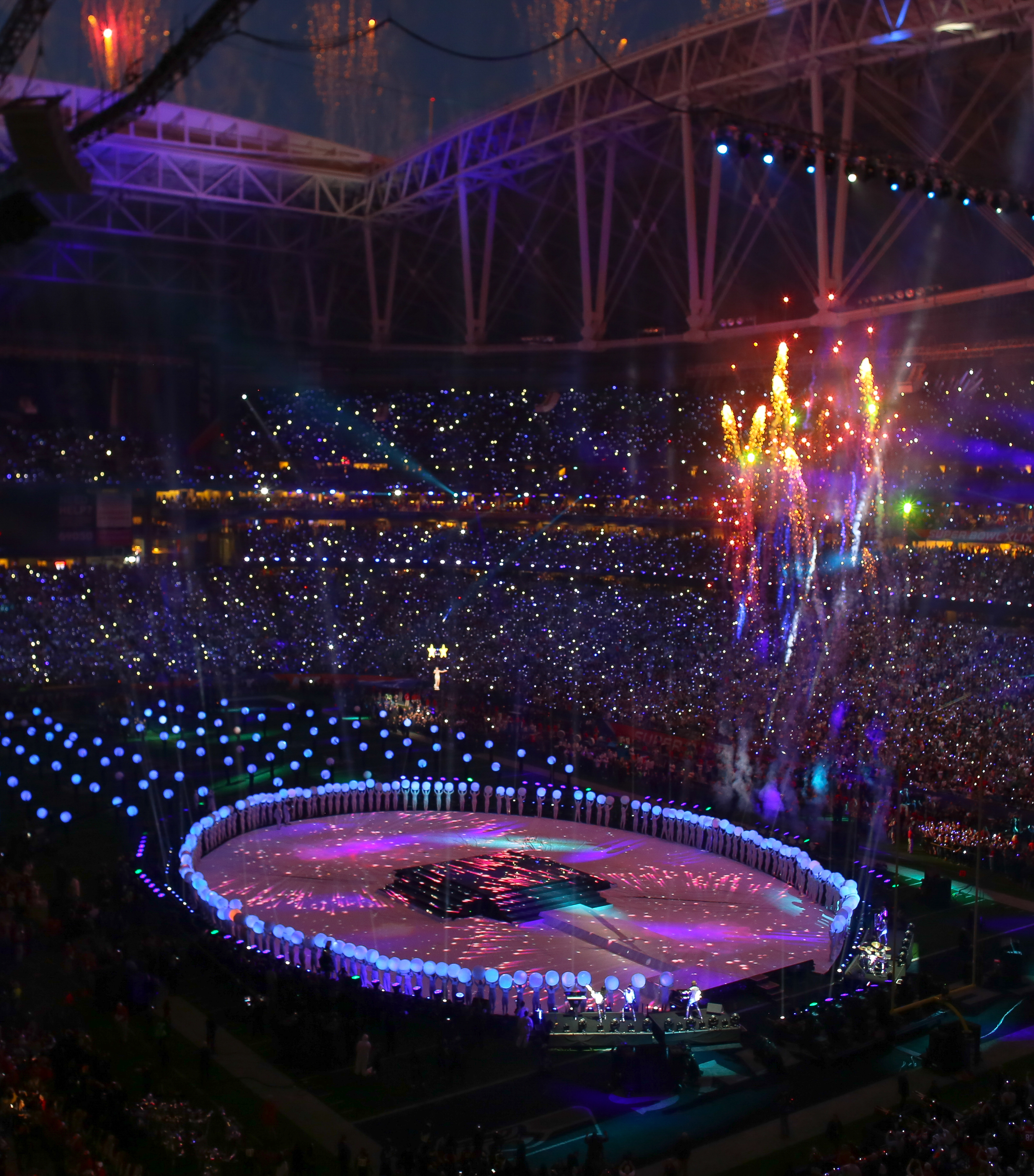
The halftime show performance and the stage

Perry's performance was critically acclaimed. James Montgomery of Rolling Stone called the show "bright [and] booming". He also stated that Perry showcased "triumphant" vocals and stated that Perry "left it all on the field" after taking a "well deserved victory lap" during the performance of "Firework". He also complimented Missy Elliott's appearance, calling it "thrill[ing]". Jason Lipshutz of Billboard stated that the "fiery" performance "did not disappoint" and was a "career highlight" for Perry. Chris Chase of USA Today stated that the performance "felt more like an Olympic Opening Ceremony", which he called a "major achievement". Chase stated that Perry's performance "is what a Super Bowl halftime show should be", while noting that Perry appeared to be singing live and stating that most Twitter users were impressed with the performance. However, Chase felt that Elliott's appearance was "deflated" and "instantly forgettable," while Kravitz's appearance was unnecessary, stating that similar to Prince, Bruce Springsteen, and Michael Jackson, Perry was a "real star" who did not need a special guest.

Alex Needham of The Guardian gave the "high-octane" performance 4 out of 5 stars, complimenting Elliott's appearance, which he stated almost "[stole] the slot" from Perry until she topped Elliott's appearance with her performance of "Firework." Needham stated that although the performance "didn't know the meaning of 'too much'" at times, Perry never appeared to be overwhelmed. Josh Duboff of Vanity Fair stated that Perry "killed it" and "more than made up for" what she lacked in "dance moves or vocal precision" in "enthusiasm and ingenuity". Daniel D'Addario of Time stated that Perry had "justified the NFL's trust in her with a dynamic, wild show" and stated that she did not "miss a step or a note". D'Addario stated that the only part of the performance that "fell flat" was the inclusion of "I Kissed a Girl" on the setlist, saying that Perry "shouldn't be relying on the cheap titillation of her first single" to get people's attention "this deep into her career". He reacted positively to Elliott's appearance, stating that both Perry and Elliott "deserved 110 million pairs of eyes on them". Amanda Michelle Steiner of People wrote: "Katy Perry fan or not, even the most cynical hater would have to admit that her Super Bowl performance on Sunday was a pop culture masterpiece." Jon Caramanica of The New York Times felt that Perry "benefited far more" from Elliott's appearance than Kravitz, adding that Elliott's songs "easily doubled the energy onstage".

At the 67th Primetime Creative Arts Emmy Awards on September 12, 2015, the halftime show won the awards for Outstanding Lighting Design/Lighting Direction for a Variety Special and Outstanding Costumes for a Variety Program or Special. The halftime show was also nominated for Outstanding Short-Format Live-Action Entertainment Program.

== Commercial impact ==
According to Nielsen ratings, the halftime show was seen by 118.5 million viewers, an increase of three million over Bruno Mars' Super Bowl XLVIII performance. In comparison, the Super Bowl telecast as a whole had an average viewership of 114.4 million (credited as the second-most watched program in American television history), and peaked at 120.8 million during the fourth quarter.

Following the halftime show, all three of the songs performed by Missy Elliott entered the top twenty singles list on iTunes, and later reached the top ten. Billboard reported that industry sources expected Perry's songs to collectively sell around 100,000 downloads as a result of the performance, while Elliott's songs were predicted to sell up to 70,000 downloads, which would be an increase of more than 1,000% from the previous week (where Elliott sold 6,000 song downloads). For the week ending February 1, 2015, Perry's discography registered a 92% sales gain in the United States, selling 121,000 albums and song downloads in total. Meanwhile, Elliot's albums and song downloads sold 73,000, up 996% from the previous week.

=== Left Shark ===
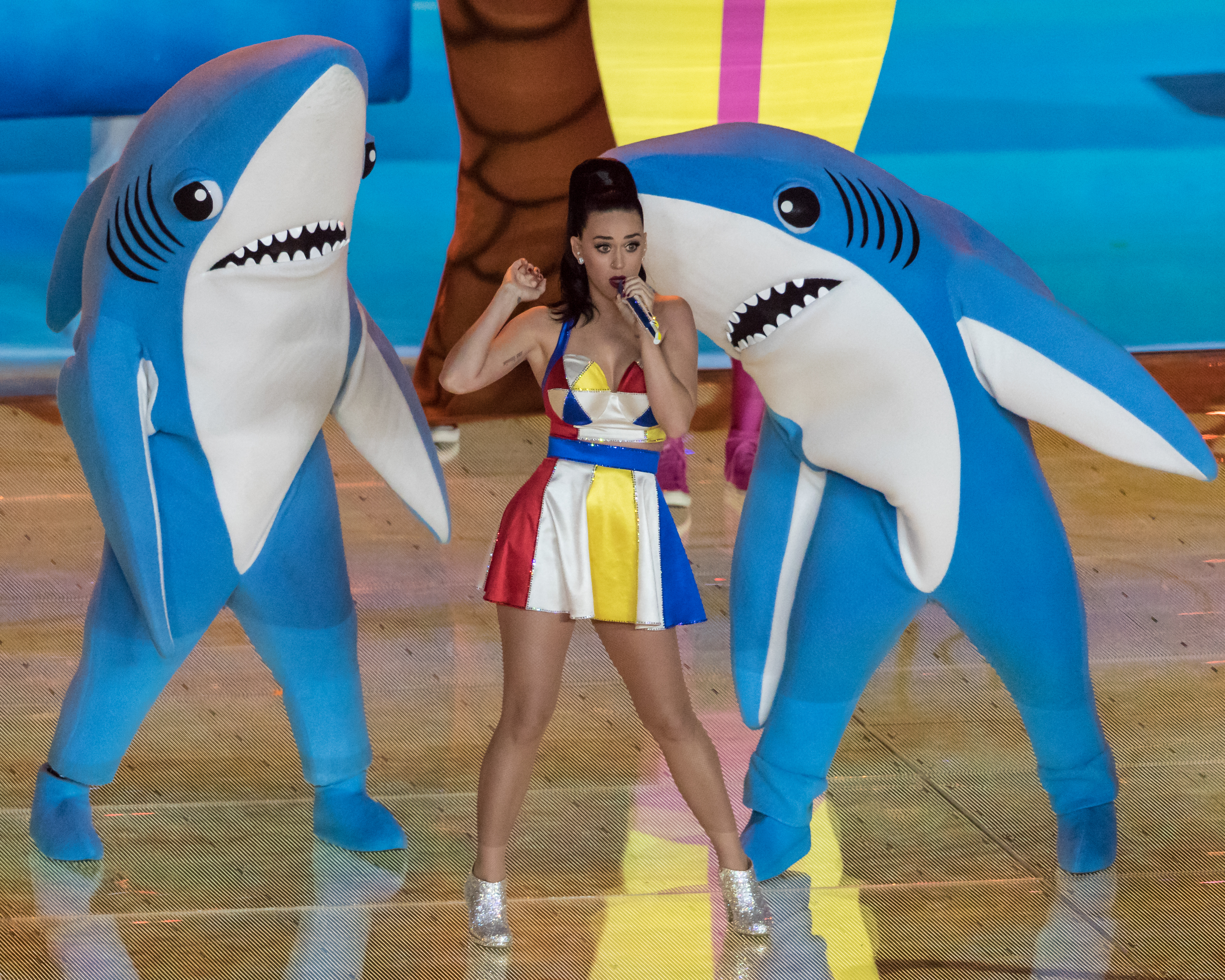
Perry with backup dancers in shark costumes during the performance of "Teenage Dream"

During Perry's performance of "Teenage Dream" and "California Gurls", she was accompanied by several dancers in various beach-themed costumes, including two dressed as sharks. Left Shark, on house left, to Perry's right (stage right), received significant fan and media attention during and after the halftime performance because of its distinct dance moves, which were both offbeat and out of sync with the "Right Shark". Left Shark quickly became an Internet sensation, appearing on social media sites such as Facebook and Twitter and also became an internet meme. The identities of both sharks were later revealed to be Perry's longtime background dancers Scott Myrick (Right Shark) and Bryan Gaw (Left Shark).

Various other elements of Perry's performance, such as her entrance on a mechanical lion, her costumes, and her exit on a flying star (which itself was compared to the former logo of NBC's PSA segments The More You Know), were all incorporated into humorous images on social media.

Organizing choreographer RJ Durell stated that the dancers, both long-time stage performers from Perry's past concerts, were not given rigorous choreography but instead told to mimic Perry's moves. In an interview with The Hollywood Reporter, Durell said that the Left Shark's performance was intentional, stating their objectives were to "perform Katy's trademark moves to the 'Teenage Dream' chorus, which they both did perfectly" and "have loads of fun, and bring to life these characters in a cartoon manner, giving them a Tweedledee/Tweedledum-type persona".

Super Bowl halftime show director Hamish Hamilton later said that the Left Shark performance was inspired by a Scissor Sisters performance in the 2005 Brit Awards, where the group played "Take Your Mama" in front of a surreal farmyard with massive bird-like puppets. Hamilton stated that, "We were trying to work out how we could bring a beach scene to life and so one of the references that we looked at was that Scissor Sisters performance. The genesis of the Left Shark was actually a singing melon."

After the Super Bowl, lawyers for Perry sought copyright and trademark protection for Left Shark. Specifically, they tried to register Left Shark as a trademark with the USPTO. Perry's team also sought to register "Right Shark", "Drunk Shark", and "Basking Shark". The U.S. Trademark Office rejected her initial attempt to register "Left Shark". Her team initiated litigation against an Orlando, Florida, artist named Fernando Sosa, who had been making 3-D figurines of Left Shark.

== Set list ==
Set list adapted from Billboard.

1. "Roar"
2. "Dark Horse"
3. "I Kissed a Girl" (with Lenny Kravitz)
4. "Teenage Dream"
5. "California Gurls"
6. "Get Ur Freak On" / "Work It" (with Missy Elliott)
7. "Lose Control" (Missy Elliott solo)
8. "Firework"

== See also ==
- 2015 in American music
- 2015 in American television
