= Runaway Baby =

2010 song by Bruno Mars

Song by Bruno Mars

from the album Doo-Wops & Hooligans
- Released: October 4, 2010
- Genre: Funk; pop rock; doo-wop; soul
- Length: 2:27
- Label: Atlantic; Elektra
- Songwriters: Bruno Mars; Philip Lawrence; Ari Levine; Brody Brown
- Producer: The Smeezingtons

Lyric video
- "Runaway Baby" on YouTube

"Runaway Baby" is a song by American singer-songwriter Bruno Mars from his debut studio album Doo-Wops & Hooligans (2010). It was written by Mars, Philip Lawrence, Ari Levine and Brody Brown. The former three produced the track under their alias, the Smeezingtons. "Runaway Baby" is a funk, pop rock, doo-wop and soul record. Its lyrics detail a playboy who is willing to break a woman's heart regardless of their feelings. Instrumentally, the track relies on finger snaps, police sirens, hand claps and guitar. It received mixed reviews from music critics, who considered it one of the standouts in the album, but criticized its lyrical content.

"Runaway Baby" debuted and peaked at number 19 on the UK Singles Chart after The X Factor performance, and it peaked at number 35 and 50 in New Zealand and on Billboard Hot 100, respectively. It was certified double platinum by the Recorded Music NZ (RMNZ), platinum by the British Phonographic Industry (BPI) and three times platinum by the Recording Industry Association of America (RIAA) and Music Canada (MC). The singer performed "Runaway Baby" at the 54th Annual Grammy Awards, at the Super Bowl XLVIII halftime show and on all his concerts since 2010. The performances included an extra break with a James Brown dance and singing through a megaphone.

== Composition and production ==
"Runaway Baby" is a retro funk, pop rock, doo-wop soul, and bubblegum R&B track. Ken Tucker of NPR found it hard to categorize the recording. Its instrumentation includes 60's soul finger snaps, police sirens, hand claps and "scratchy guitarlines". The song was composed in the key of E minor with a tempo of 144 beats per minute. Jon Caramanica from The New York Times felt that Mars was trying to "channel" Little Richard and called the track "jumpy" and "salacious". Brittany Spanos of Rolling Stone found the song to have "an electric riff as rapidly talk-sings" and to be inspired by James Brown. Lyrically, "Runaway Baby" conveys the message for women to avoid Mars since he is willing to break their hearts due to being a playboy and a "rolling stone" ("Lord knows I'm a rolling stone"). Moreover, there is a comparison established between Mars's penis and a carrot, "So many eager young bunnies...and they all got to share it."

"Runaway Baby" was written by Mars, Philip Lawrence, Ari Levine and Brody Brown. The former three produced the track under their alias, the Smeezingtons. Mars, Levine and Brown played all the instruments on the song. Levine was in charge of engineering the song, which he did at Levcon Studios, in California. The mixing of "Runaway Baby" was done at Larrabee Sound Studios, in North Hollywood by Manny Marroquin, with Christian Plata and Erik Madrid serving as assistants. It was mastered by Stephen Marcussen at Marcussen Mastering in Hollywood, California.

== Critical reception ==
"Runaway Baby" has received mixed reviews from music critics. Luke Gibson from HipHopDX and Entertainment Weekly's Leah Greenblatt considered "Runaway Baby" one of the standouts in the album. The former added that Mars shows his writing skills, despite being so different from the other recordings. Yahoo!'s music critic, Sherri Thornhill, had a mixed opinion towards the track, calling it a "catchy" and "gets your toes tapping", despite not being one of her favorites. Blues & Soul publication found "Runaway Baby" to be inspired in The Jacksons, and "60s rock groove" from Eric Clapton and Cream; dubbing it as "enjoyable even though it's completely vacuous!". Brittany Spanos of Rolling Stone described the track as one of Mars's "catchiest and most infectious".

On the other hand, Tim Sendra of AllMusic gave it a negative analysis, "is a pretty cheesy rocker, suffering from clichéd lyrics and production." Alexis Petridis from The Guardian went on to analyze some verses and gave them a harsh review, "Mars compares his penis to a carrot", which could not only lead to speculation regarding its meaning, but also "it's an image that haunts the rest of the song." He continued criticizing as the lyrics tell that "the object of his affections" should not try to connected Mars which could be related to his "carrot-like penis". MusicOMH's Jamie Milton felt that the recording was one of the things wrong with the album as at its core "involves throwing everything into the fire", mainly due to its "bad-boy pop-punkrealms".

== Commercial performance ==
Following Mars's performance on The X Factor on October 22, 2011, "Runaway Baby" debuted in three different charts according to the Official Charts Company. It entered at number 18 on the United Kingdom, spending 11 weeks on the chart. Moreover, it debuted at number 19 in Scotland and number five at the United Kingdom R&B chart. The song was certified platinum by the British Phonographic Industry (BPI). In 2012, it entered and peaked at number 66 and 50 on the Canadian Hot 100 and on the Billboard Hot 100, respectively. "Runaway Baby" was certified three times platinum by the Recording Industry Association of America (RIAA) and by Music Canada (MC). In New Zealand, the track peaked at number 35 and it was certified two times platinum by the Recorded Music NZ (RMNZ).

== Live performances and other usage ==
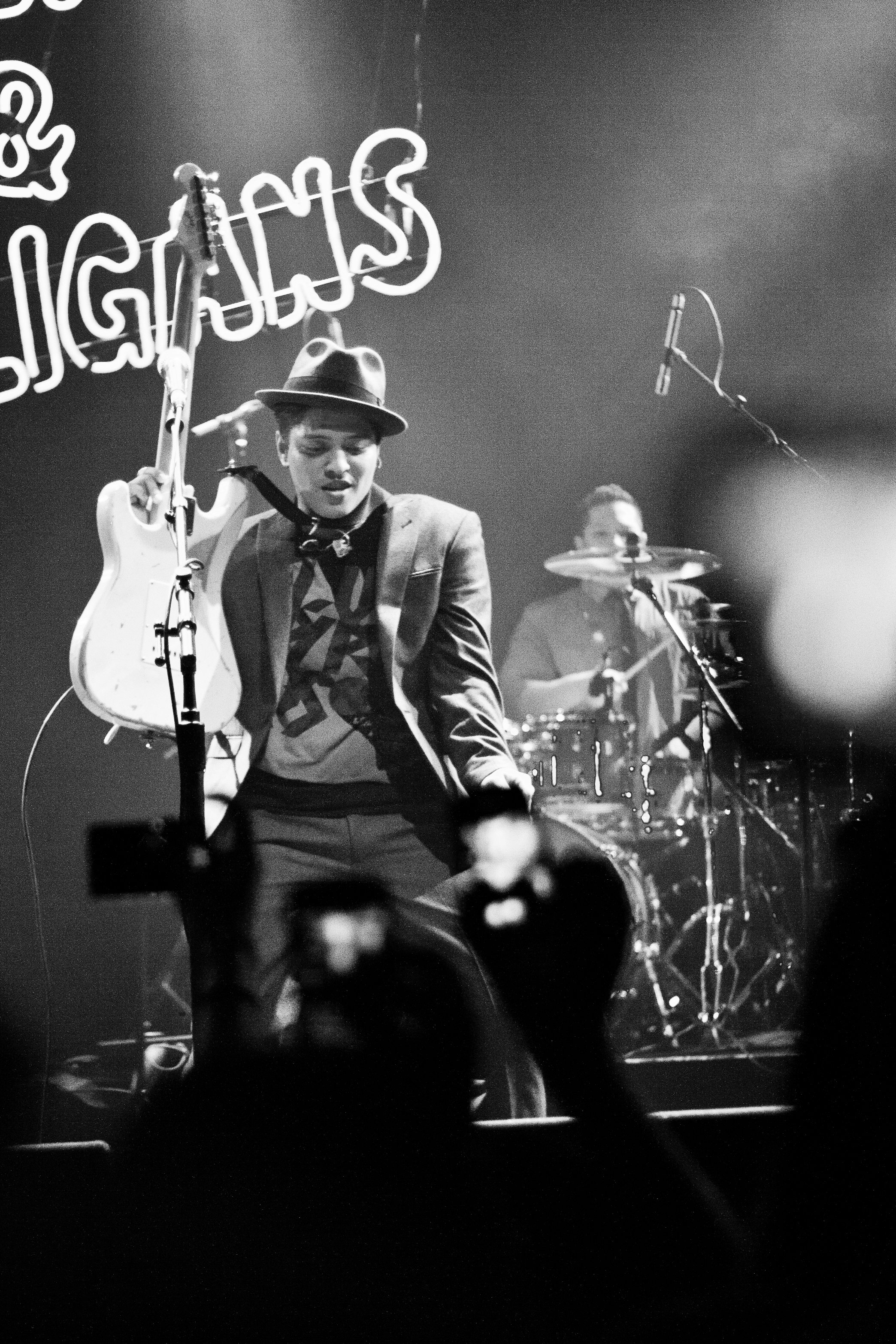
Mars performing the song in Houston, Texas, on November 24, 2010.

Mars performed "Runaway Baby" live for the first time on June 24, 2011, at the NBC's Today Show as he danced along with his band. The choreography was inspired by James Brown, and Mars picked up a megaphone to sing some of the lyrics. On October 22, 2011, Mars and his band wore matching red velvet Dolce & Gabbana suits during the song's performance on the results show of The X Factor UK. Robbie Daw of Idolator called the live show "rowdy", while a writer for Rap-Up praised the performance, writing that it "rocked the house" due to his "James Brown funky moves" and singing into a megaphone.

On February 12, 2012, Mars performed "Runaway Baby" during the 54th Annual Grammy Awards along with his band, wearing matching shining black-and-gold tuxedos. The stage, which was revealed during the rehearsals, included a wall with light bulbs and a giant marquee, which spelled "Live on Stage Bruno Mars." Furthermore, pyro and giant spotlights were used. The Grammys' executive producer Ken Erhlich wanted Mars to perform the track on the Grammys since he had seen it live. Mars's performance was dedicated to the soon deceased Whitney Houston. Claire Suddath of Time dubbed it as "retro Motown" and enjoyable. She found the James Brown-inspired choreography "spot-on". However, Suddath considered the singer to be "too perfect". She rated his performance a B+. MTV's Jocelyn Vena thought the performance was energetic and "triumphant". At the 2012 Met Gala, Mars performed "Runaway Baby", wearing Prada, with the James Brown breakdown, followed by a medley of covers, which included "Ni**as in Paris", "Roxanne" and "Rock the Boat".

Mars performed a shortened version of the song as part of his Super Bowl XLVIII halftime show, with a reference to The Isley Brothers' "Shout" and the James Brown-inspired choreography. Mars rapped the words "give it away, give it away, give it away now" as the Red Hot Chili Peppers made their cameo. Idolator's Carl Williott complemented the singer's "strong live vocals and stellar footwork". American singer and actress Carly Rose Sonenclar covered the song on her YouTube channel. In 2017, Anatalia Villaranda covered "Runaway Baby" during her Blind Audition at The Voice.

Mars performed the song during The Doo-Wops & Hooligans Tour (2010–12), the Hooligans in Wondaland Tour (2011) and on The Moonshine Jungle Tour (2013–14). He also sang it on his debut concert residency, Bruno Mars at The Chelsea, Las Vegas (2013–15), the 24K Magic World Tour (2017–18) and with Anderson .Paak, as Silk Sonic, during An Evening with Silk Sonic at Park MGM (2022). "Runaway Baby" was part of the Bruno Mars Live (2022-2024) setlist. In 2011, the track was used as the opening theme for the film Friends with Benefits. In 2017, Dwayne Johnson chose the song to be used in the video game WWE 2K18. In 2019, "Runaway Baby" was used in a commercial for Goal.

== Personnel ==
Credits adapted from the liner notes of Doo-Wops & Hooligans.

- Bruno Mars – lead vocals, songwriting, instrumentation
- Philip Lawrence – songwriting
- Ari Levine – songwriting, instrumentation, engineer
- Brody Brown – songwriting, instrumentation
- The Smeezingtons – production
- Manny Marroquin – mixing
- Erik Madrid – mixing assistant
- Christian Plata – mixing assistant
- Stephen Marcussen – mastering

== Charts ==
=== Weekly charts ===
List of chart positions
| Chart (2011–12) | Peak position |
|---|---|
| Canada Hot 100 (Billboard) | 66 |
| New Zealand (Recorded Music NZ) | 35 |
| Scottish Singles Sales (Official Charts) | 18 |
| UK Singles (Official Charts) | 19 |
| UK Hip Hop/R&B (Official Charts) | 5 |
| US Billboard Hot 100 | 50 |

´

List of chart position
| Chart (2024) | Peak position |
|---|---|
| Singapore (RIAS) | 30 |

== Certifications ==
List of certifications
| Region | Certification | Certified units/sales |
|---|---|---|
| Canada (Music Canada) | 3× Platinum | 240,000^{‡} |
| Denmark (IFPI Danmark) | Gold | 45,000^{‡} |
| New Zealand (RMNZ) | 2× Platinum | 60,000^{‡} |
| United Kingdom (BPI) | Platinum | 600,000^{‡} |
| United States (RIAA) | 3× Platinum | 3,000,000^{‡} |
Streaming
| Japan (RIAJ) | Platinum | 100,000,000^{†} |
^{‡} Sales+streaming figures based on certification alone.^{†} Streaming-only figures based on certification alone.
