= Teen Choice Award for Choice Music – Tour =

Entertainment award category

The following is a list of Teen Choice Award winners and nominees for Choice Music - Tour or Choice Music - Summer Tour.

== Winners and nominees ==
=== 2000s ===
Year	Winner	Nominees	Ref.
2004	No Doubt and Blink-182 – Summer Tour 2004	3 Doors Down & Nickelback – The Long Road Tour; Beyoncé, Missy Elliott, & Alicia Keys – Verizon Ladies First Tour; Incubus & The Vines – 2004 World Tour; Avril Lavigne – Try To Shut Me Up Tour; John Mayer with Maroon 5 – Heavier Things Tour; Jessica Simpson – Reality Tour; Britney Spears – The Onyx Hotel Tour	
2009	Demi Lovato and David Archuleta – Demi Lovato: Live in Concert	American Idol – American Idols LIVE! Tour 2009; Jonas Brothers – Jonas Brothers World Tour 2009; Britney Spears – The Circus Starring Britney Spears; Taylor Swift – Fearless Tour	

=== 2010s ===
Year	Winner	Nominees	Ref.
2013	One Direction – Take Me Home Tour	Beyoncé – The Mrs. Carter Show World Tour; Jay Z & Justin Timberlake – Legends of the Summer Tour; Bruno Mars – The Moonshine Jungle Tour; Taylor Swift – Red Tour	
2014	One Direction – Where We Are Tour	Beyoncé & Jay Z – On the Run Tour; Luke Bryan – That's My Kind of Night Tour; Katy Perry – Prismatic World Tour; Justin Timberlake – The 20/20 Experience World Tour	
2015	One Direction – On the Road Again Tour	5 Seconds of Summer – Rock Out with Your Socks Out Tour; Fall Out Boy & Wiz Khalifa – Boys of Zummer Tour; Ariana Grande – The Honeymoon Tour; Ed Sheeran – x Tour; Taylor Swift – The 1989 World Tour	
2016	5 Seconds of Summer – Sounds Live Feels Live Tour	Fifth Harmony – The 7/27 Tour; Demi Lovato and Nick Jonas – Future Now Tour; Justin Bieber – Purpose World Tour; Selena Gomez – Revival Tour; Shawn Mendes – Shawn Mendes World Tour	
2017	Ariana Grande – Dangerous Woman Tour	Sam Hunt – 15 in a 30 Tour; Kendrick Lamar – Damn Tour; Bruno Mars – 24K Magic World Tour; Shawn Mendes – Illuminate World Tour; Ed Sheeran – ÷ Tour	
2018	Harry Styles – Harry Styles: Live on Tour	Charlie Puth – Voicenotes Tour; Jay-Z & Beyoncé – On the Run II Tour; Top Dawg Entertainment – The Championship Tour; Niall Horan – Flicker World Tour; Taylor Swift – Reputation Stadium Tour	
