= PixMob =

Live event lighting technology

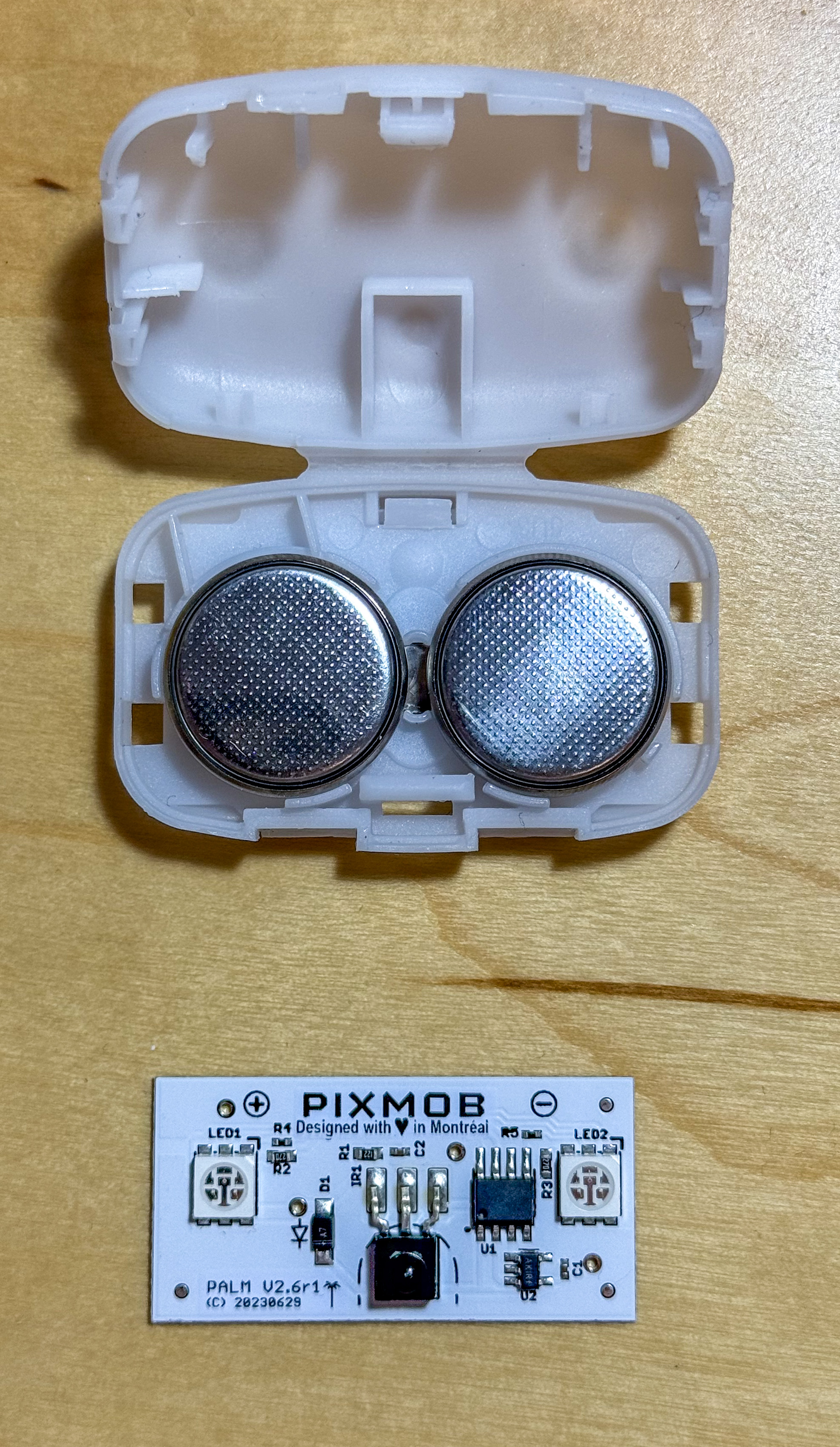
Circuit board and case of a PixMob wristband, used at the Taylor Swift concert in Zurich in July 2024

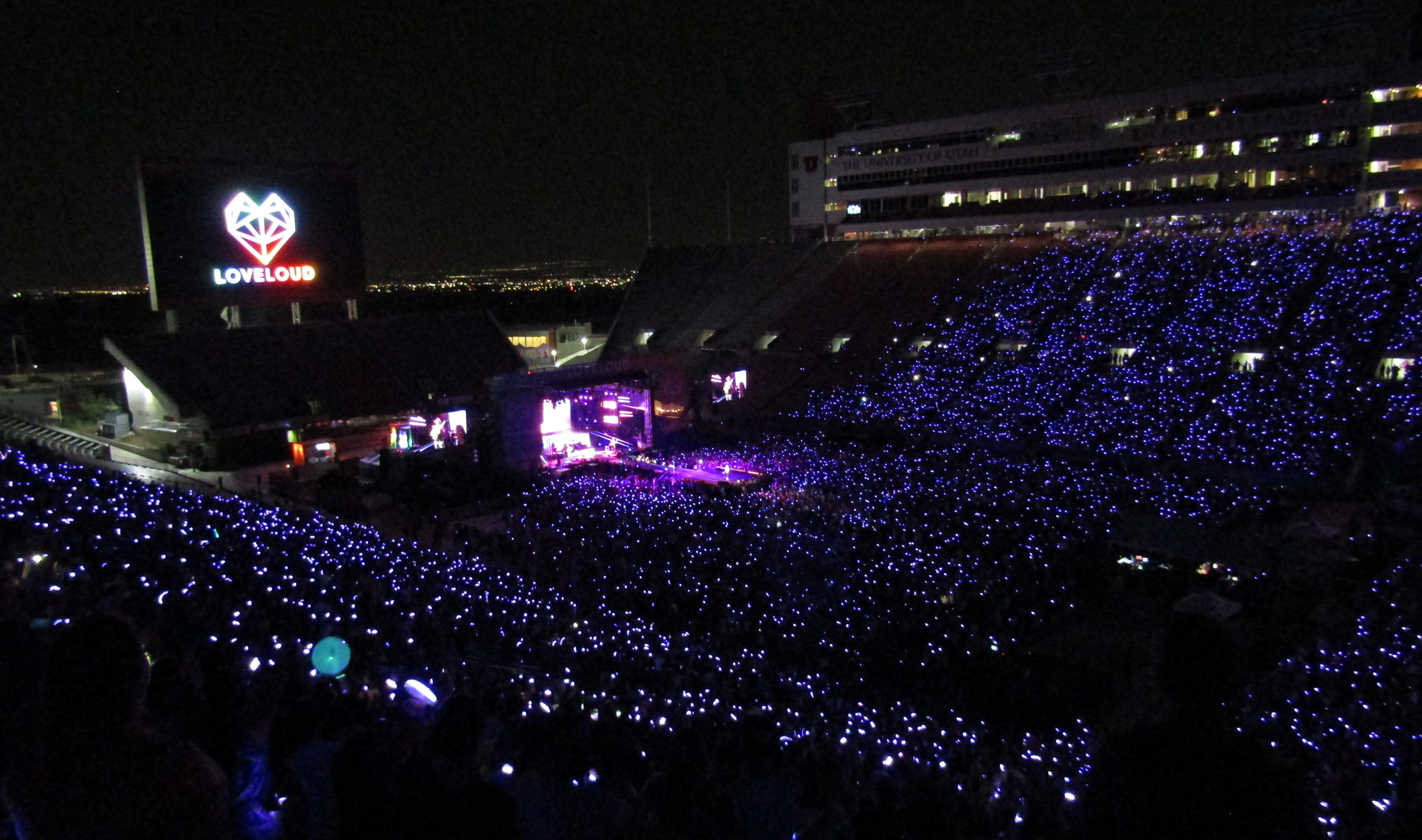
PixMob wristbands creating a synchronized light show at a pop concert

PixMob is a wireless lighting technology of Eski Inc. that controls wearable LED devices: by using the wearable objects as pixels, an event's audience itself can become a display. The light effects produced by these LED devices can be controlled to match a light show, pulsate in sync with the music, react to the body movement, etc.

PixMob was developed by the Montreal-based company Eski Inc. in 2010. The technology comes in different versions providing different ways to wirelessly control any of the objects. The latest version, PixMob VIDEO, debuted during the Super Bowl XLVIII halftime show.

== Technology ==
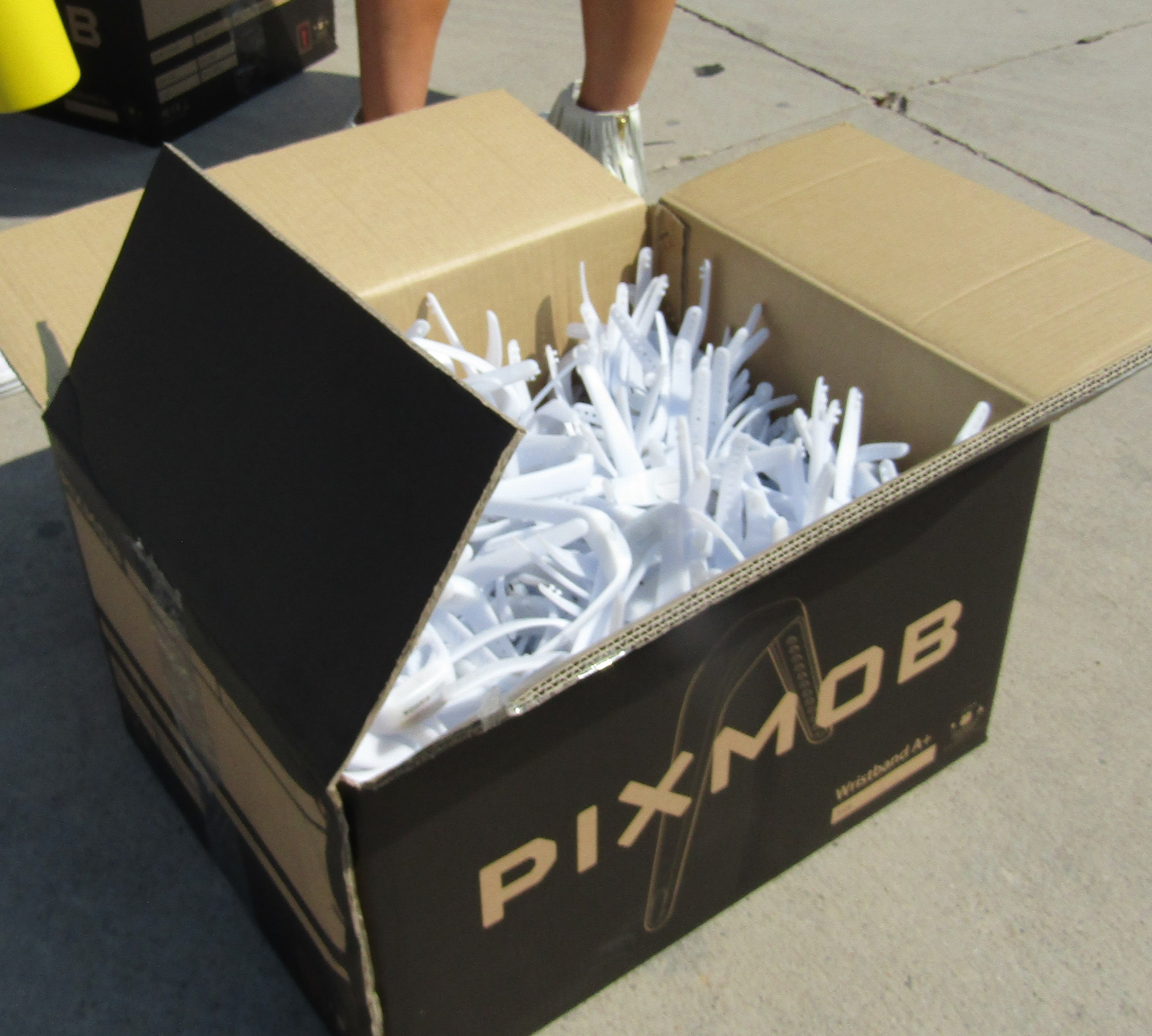
Box of PixMob wristbands ready for distribution

PixMob technology uses infrared to light up RGB LEDs that are embedded in different objects such as balls or wristbands. These wearable objects are given to an audience, transforming each individual into a pixel during the show. To light up each pixel (i.e. each LED), commands are sent from computers to transmitters that emit invisible light (infrared). The infrared signal is picked up by infrared receivers in each object and goes through a tiny 8-bit microprocessor to light up the LEDs. The type of transmitter involved differs depending on the selected version of the technology. Wash fixtures or lekos, typically seen in the live entertainment industry, are usually used. For the PixMob video technology, VT transmitters beam video instructions onto the audience, almost like a matrix creating a virtual map. With this technology, the infrared receiver decodes the signal differently depending on each pixel/person's location. This enables the creation of animated video effects and transforms the audience into a display screen. Despite the low-resolution result due to a low number of pixels, quite detailed video effects can be achieved on a large canvas, using bright colors and bold movements.

== Uses ==
=== Microsoft Kinect Launch ===
The technology debuted at the Microsoft Kinect Launch in June 2010, where white satin ponchos embedded with wirelessly-controlled LEDs were used to integrate the audience into the show.

=== Arcade Fire – Coachella 2011 ===
In 2011, Montreal's Arcade Fire used PixMob balls during their encore performance of "Wake Up" at Coachella Festival. The project, entitled Summer Into Dust, was sponsored by The Creators Project and produced by Radical Media. This was made possible due to Arcade Fire, Chris Milk, Moment Factory and Tangible Interaction. More than 1,250 glowing balls were dropped from the stage onto the audience. They contained battery-powered circuit boards studded with full-color LEDs that changed colors in unison, thanks to built-in infrared receivers and microphones.

=== Tiësto ===
Dutch DJ and producer Tiësto used PixMob wristbands for his 2014 residency at Hakkasan. During the Super Bowl XLVIII Halftime Show, he tweeted that he would use the video technology for the February 28 show at Hakkasan Las Vegas Restaurant and Nightclub.

=== Super Bowl XLVIII Halftime Show ===
PixMob launched their video version of the technology at the 2014 Super Bowl XLVIII halftime show. Each spectator received a black knitted hat called a "video ski hat" embedded with 3 LEDs and an infrared receiver. Just before the show, spectators were asked to put on their hats and remain seated to form a huge display. Wearing the video ski hats, each spectator became a pixel in a giant human screen composed of 80,000 pixels. Touchdown Entertainment, the company that produced the event, claimed it was "the largest ever LED screen". The spectators saw different kinds of visuals effects including a Pepsi logo moving around the stadium as well as images of the live Red Hot Chili Peppers' performance and fireworks display.

== Inspirations ==
Several sources of inspiration for the technology have been given by its inventors, David Parent and Vincent Leclerc, in interviews: the use of lighters in concerts, the Burning Man festival, fire rituals, as well as the large human screens made from crowd members holding placards in Korea. The co-founders explain that their goal is to augment the collective experience of being part of a show.

== See also ==
- Xyloband
