= The Moonshine Jungle Tour =

2013–14 concert tour by Bruno Mars

- World tour by Bruno Mars
- Promotional poster for the tour
- Location: Asia; Europe; North America; Oceania
- Associated album: Unorthodox Jukebox
- Start date: June 22, 2013
- End date: October 4, 2014
- Legs: 7
- No. of shows: 144
- Box office: US$156.4 million

Bruno Mars concert chronology
- Hooligans in Wondaland Tour (2011); The Moonshine Jungle Tour (2013–14); Bruno Mars at the Chelsea, Las Vegas (2013–15)

The Moonshine Jungle Tour was the third concert tour by American singer-songwriter Bruno Mars. The tour supported his second studio album, Unorthodox Jukebox (2012), from June 2013 to October 2014. After an official announcement on February 10, 2013, which coincided with Mars's performance at the 55th Annual Grammy Awards, a promotional trailer and behind-the-scenes footage of the tour were released through Mars's official YouTube channel and website. Mars and his team selected Ellie Goulding and Fitz and the Tantrums as the opening acts for the first North American leg, while music video director Cameron Duddy was signed as creative director for the tour in North America. In Europe and Oceania, Mayer Hawthorne and Miguel, respectively, were selected to open the shows.

In 2014, Mars announced an Asian leg and a second leg in North America, which featured Pharrell Williams and Aloe Blacc as the supporting acts. However, due to schedule conflicts, Williams was replaced by Nico & Vinz. Mars's well received performance at the Super Bowl XLVIII halftime show led to a frenzy in ticket scalping in several states, especially Hawaii. As a consequence, The "Bruno Mars Act" was passed by the State Senate of Hawaii to limit all ticket purchases within 48 hours of the on-sale to the physical box office, but the bill died at the conference committee. The show's set list consisted of songs from Doo-Wops & Hooligans (2010) and Unorthodox Jukebox and some covers; the songs were performed by Mars, who was backed by an eight-piece band, The Hooligans. The show ended with Mars performing "Locked out of Heaven" and "Gorilla" in an encore.

The Moonshine Jungle Tour received a positive reception from music critics, who praised not only Mars energetic and "genre-jumping" performances, but also his abilities on the drums and guitar solos, as well as the special effects. Others criticized the "long breakdowns and interludes," labeling them as unnecessary. As soon as the tour was announced, tickets were sold everywhere without pre-sale. After its end, the Moonshine Jungle Tour was reported to have grossed over $156.4 million, with Billboard Boxscore reporting a gross of $136 million. The tour was nominated for three Pollstar Awards.

== Background ==
The first promotional poster of the tour, which included dates prior to 2014

The Moonshine Jungle Tour was announced on February 10, 2013, after Bruno Mars performance at the 55th Annual Grammy Awards, by William Morris Endeavor (WME). Instead of announcing everything and starting sales later in the same week, WME decided to reveal the shows in an unconventional way. Consequently, two days after the Grammy performance, the cities were unveiled. A few days later the dates and venues were announced. Finally, the tickets were made available two and a half weeks after the cities were disclosed. A promotional trailer and behind-the-scenes footage of the tour were released on Mars's YouTube channel and website to further promote the tour.

WME decided to price each market differently, with a total of four different price points. In most markets each ticket would cost US$62, while in bigger cities the tickets were between $130 and $140. However, in minor cities the tickets were cheaper and similarly priced. One aspect that received attention was the decision to sell the front seats prior to the back ones. If that did not occur, it would mean that the front seats were too expensive, but the tour did not suffer from this problem. Unlike the prior tour, where Mars performed in theaters and ballrooms, in January 2012 it was determines that the concerts would be in arenas. This decision was based upon his successful debut tour, not only based on the amount of sold-out concerts, but also due to his "dynamic performances." John Marx, an associate and personal manager at the music division of WME, explained, regarding the previous decision, that "analytics only give you so much...it has to do with what's in your gut and what you think." Since the beginning there were plans to schedule dates in the United Kingdom and Europe, a leg of the tour that took around two months to be completed. Concerts were also scheduled in Australia and New Zealand for early 2014, as well as at 40 stages in North America. In the end, more seats were added to venues due to overwhelmingly strong ticket sales. It was Mars's first world tour to not reach South America.

The tour was first scheduled to begin in February, having been booked a year in advance. Nevertheless, not only was the album Unorthodox Jukebox released later than expected, but many tours were already scheduled in the first quarter of the year. This led to the tour being delayed until the summer in North America. According to Marx, this and the previously mentioned unusual announcements contributed to the success of the tour. Notwithstanding, Marx has run successful tours with several artists during the first quarter of the year.

== Development ==
"The absence of any presale was a very strong contributing factor toward the overall success of this tour."

— John Marx

After the tour was confirmed, Mars and his band started preparing for it. His manager at the time, Brandon Creed, said that Mars was more focused and excited than nervous. He furthered that the singer spent most of his time rehearsing, preparing, directing, and choreographing everything. Commenting on the development, Creed said, "We're going into rehearsals now, so I don't have much to share, but it's going to be ... incredible ... it's hectic, but it's amazing ... It's a thrill to work with an artist so talented." After evaluating the American Express and Citibank suggestions regarding a presale, WME decided not to pursue the idea with the agreement of Mars's management, a decision which ending up further promoting the tour. The idea was received with some skepticism within the team; some believed it was a good idea but most were reluctant and thought it was an awful idea, as buyers find presale a crucial element of tours. Cameron Duddy was the music director for the first leg of the North American tour.

Ellie Goulding and Fitz and the Tantrums were signed as the opening act for the first leg of tour in North American. Marx recollected that the team approached several agencies and asked for suggestions. In the end, Mars decided to pick Goulding, who was seen as someone who could assure sales. Marx was pleased with the tour development since everyone's efforts, from The Smeezingtons to the label Atlantic Records, benefited it. Despite having booked tours for acts such as Lady Gaga, Peter Gabriel, and Justin Timberlake, Marx said that booking this tour was among the most exhilarating experiences during his 37-year career. He added that the setup was "unique and special". The stage configuration would vary according to the sales, having three different configurations available before selling seats in over 180-degrees arcs from the stage. Nevertheless, due to the success, the expectation was to go "into 240-degrees" and further; they ended up by opening and selling 270-degrees arcs from the stage and consequently breaking records in several venues, but they did everything to assure that all seats were suitable to experience the show in the best way possible.

=== Rehearsals ===
Mars and The Hooligans rehearsed for the tour in a Hollywood rehearsal studio. During an interview with Rolling Stone, the author, Brian Hiatt got a glimpse of most of the set for the tour. He watched Mars croon with his tenor voice during the act "Don't it feel good, baby". Afterwards, the singer tried to get the nonexistent crowd, excited "Does it feel good on the left side? What about the right side now?" During this rehearse Mars tried to make the track "Show Me" "move seamlessly" into "Our First Time". He was not satisfied with the band's choreography, as it looked to rehearsed and is not supposed to look that way.

At this point, Mars leaves the stage and tells The Hooligans to perform the moves as he watches from in front. He points out that the guitarist, Phred, is not doing the dance moves correctly. Mars decides not to include the choreography, due to the amount of time they are spending on it. Later, he tells the band to leave, joking "We'll change everything on Monday." Mars is aware of his yelling during rehearsals, stating "I always tell everybody that we finally get to enjoy all the hard work that we've done when we play and when we sing."

=== Light and sound ===
Lighting director Dave Marcucci and lighting designer Cory FitzGerald assembled a system capable of producing the aesthetic of the show. Of particular note, FitzGerald created a backdrop wall, which could be programmed to show animations and video. The fixtures were all controlled by a large scale computerized lighting console system.

Mars and his bandmates used Sennheiser microphones and wireless receivers. Mars's monitor engineer James Berry was the influence behind selecting Sennheiser over other industry standards such as Shure after finding Sennheiser's sonic character paired well with Mars's voice. Front of House engineer Derek Brenner tested several capsules and transmitter combinations.

Brenner utilized three compressors giving Mars's vocals an appropriate tonality and level consistency, he also provided a smooth and reliable reverb on them. He used compressors for kicks, snares, toms, keyboard, and drums, making them enhance their own sound, and amplified the guitar and horns audio. Brener had some onboard reverbs for snares, acoustic guitar, and horns to use in outdoor spaces. Berry used a DiGiCo SD7 mixing console for most of Mars's vocals, outputs, delay, "vocal rack" and loops. Moreover, he controlled the outputs and vocals from the loop.

== Concert synopsis ==
Shows during the first leg of North America opened either with Goulding or Fitz and the Tantrums performing their songs. The shows in Europe had Mayer Hawthorne as the opening act for Mars, while in Australia Miguel commenced the show. In January 2014, a second leg in North America was announced with Pharrell Williams or Aloe Blacc as the supporting acts. However, Williams left the tour due to scheduling conflicts after only opening two nights for Mars at the Madison Square Garden. He was replaced by Nico & Vinz. Fitz and the Tantrums and Williams were considered to be worthy performers. However, Miguel was only considered a satisfactory opening act. As they finished their performance, a giant black curtain with drawings of gold palm trees was placed in front of the stage. A voice-over pronounced, "Welcome to the Moonshine Jungle" and suddenly the drape vanished. The band – consisting of Phredley Brown (guitar); Jamareo Artis (bass); Eric Hernandez (drums); Kameron Whalum, Dwayne Dugger and James King (horns); Phillip Lawrence (backup vocals); John Fossit (keyboards) – and Mars came into focus, wearing matching red blazers, shirts with a cheetah, and gold chains. As soon as Mars reached the microphone the music started.

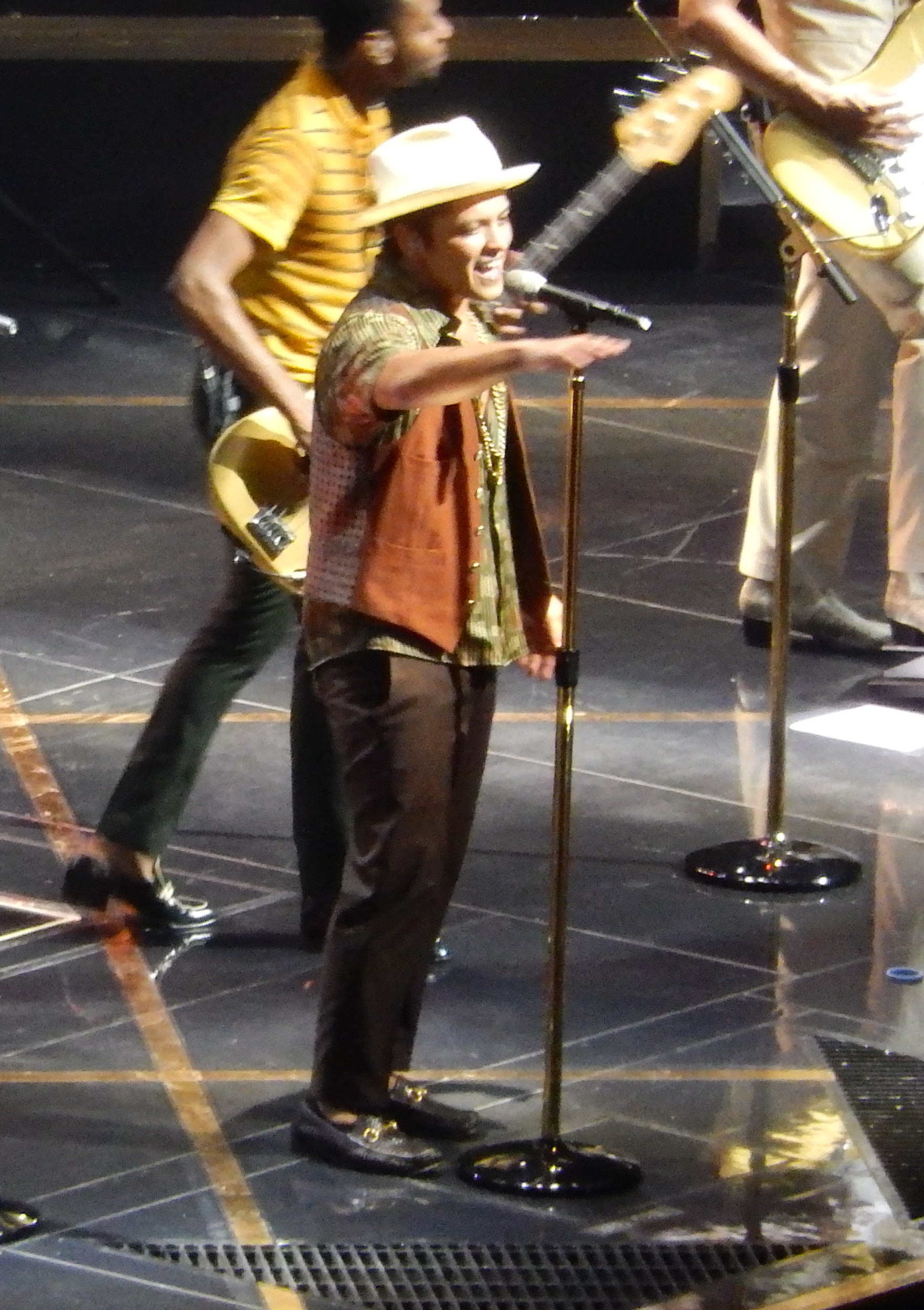
Bruno Mars performing at Madison Square Garden

"Moonshine" opened the set with Mars and The Hooligans "executing a series of slick synchronized steps." During the performance of the first segment and its follow up, "Natalie," a "hyperkinetically catchy" "booty-shaker," a giant screen behind Mars displayed flashed images and sounds of wild animals, such as panthers, gorillas, and parrots who flapped their wings in slow motion. Taking a moment to invite the audience to dance and sing along with him to the Motown and soul-funk "Treasure," a giant disco ball descended from the roof reflecting dozens of bright gold lights and multi-colored laser lights flashed. The crowd responded enthusiastically to the music. The show also included several covers of songs by other artists mashed up with Mars's tracks. A cover of Barrett Strong's "Money (That's What I Want)" was mashed up with "Billionaire" and Aloe Blacc's "I Need a Dollar" as Mars and his band gyrated with the fans. Afterwards, the stage would be colored with red, yellow, and green lights during the "reggae jam" performance of "Show Me."

He then performed a "90s R&B homage" along with "demure sexual come-ons" by covering Soul For Real's "Candy Rain" and Ginuwine's "Pony." The latter was blended into Mars's "Our First Time." In the latter's medleys, Mars would sing R. Kelly's "Ignition (Remix)" and Sister Nancy's "Bam Bam." These covers would vary between concerts and could also include Ghost Town DJs' "My Boo," Aaliyah's "Rock the Boat," "Every Little Step" by Bobby Brown, Mad Cobra's "Flex," and Lloyd's "Secret Admirer." "Marry You," the next track on the setlist, showed "pleading doo-wop accents." In some venues it was preceded by The Desires' "Let It Please Be You." It was followed by "If I Knew," during which Mars chose a woman from the audience so that he and The Hooligans could serenade her to see who could impress the girl more. The recording could be interpolated with "It Will Rain" or "Nothin' on You." The latter could also be played solely. "If I Knew" plunged low and slow at the end, before bursting into the "50s-era rock" dance track "Runaway Baby" as the fans "erupted" when the singer channeled The Isley Brothers' "little-bit-softer-now/little-bit-louder-now" routine.

Mars closed the track "Young Girls" with the most vehement singing of the show, which also contained a portion of "Girls Just Want to Have Fun" by Cyndi Lauper. Later on, the stage was left only to Mars and to two keyboardists; Mars introduced the heartbreaking piano ballad "When I Was Your Man" to the audience by saying that it was the most difficult song to write and sing. In this song Mars showed his potent vocal range as fans loudly sang along with him. A piano solo led up to "Grenade," which began as a "superhero theme" only to be played as a dramatic "bolero" with a rock interpretation. The singer showed not only his guitar abilities during the solo created for the track but also his powerful vocals once more. Mars dedicated "Just the Way You Are" to the audience. It was played as an anthem, making the crowd sing along. At this point the performers left the stage and, as the fans shouted for an encore, Mars returned to play a drum solo, as he did during the Super Bowl performance, with some of James Brown's vocals sampled that led to the opening notes and first encore of the show, "Locked Out of Heaven," sung powerfully as golden confetti poured down on the audience.

The show closer, "Gorilla," was a "perfect, slightly naughty end to an all-ages gig where the boundaries were given a nudge," with laser lights, fireballs, confetti and fireworks blasting as Mars sung on an elevated platform. Throughout the tour various setlists were used. "The Lazy Song" was one of the highlights of the tour as the crowd sung along. It also contained a comedic interlude when Mars's backup singer, Phillip Lawrence, shouted the verse of the track "OMG this is great!" At this moment, the music stopped, Mars introduced Lawrence to the fans and asked if they wanted to hear the same line again. The track was performed in some Oceania, Asian, and European concerts and on the second leg of American shows. "Count On Me" was only sung once, in Jakarta.

== Critical response ==
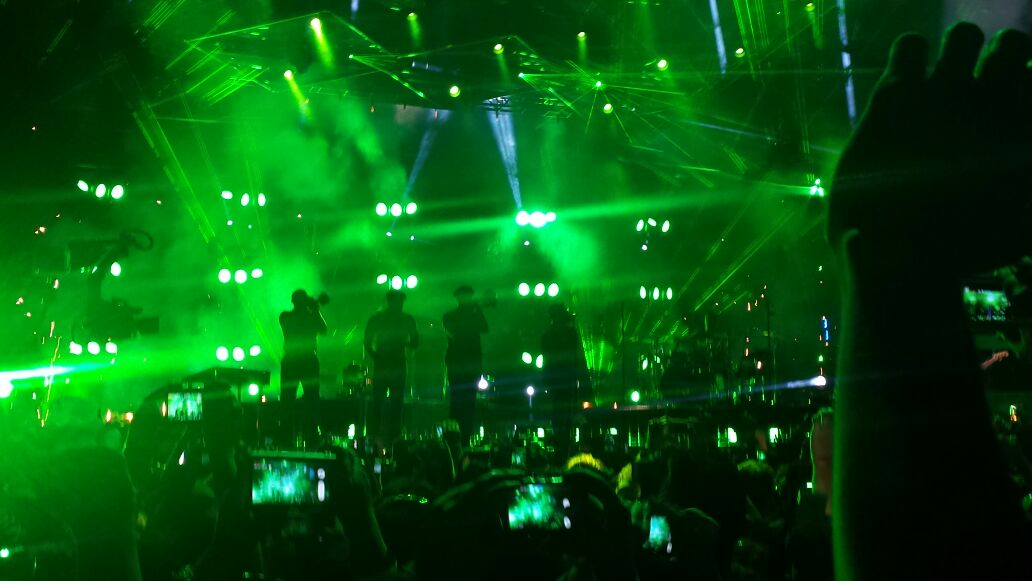
Mars and his band at the Arena Ciudad de Mexico

The tour received generally positive reviews from critics. Mikael Wood of the Los Angeles Times gave the concert a rave review, affirming that Mars's energy never ran out and praising the "seemingly effortless precision" that made the performance about itself. Wood summarized, "The harder he played, the easier it appeared to get." Mike Wass of Idolator gave a positive review, as he witnessed Mars's "powerful" vocals and the band's "incredible musicianship." He highlighted Mars's "swoonworthy rendition" of "When I Was Your Man," the "rock interpretation" of "Grenade," and the Pharrell duet. Jason Lipshutz, a Billboard magazine writer, felt that one of the most stunning aspects of the concert was the catalog of number-one records left off the live show while still making it impressive. He said that Mars is a pop artist with the "whole package," comparing him to "an ace Pixar movie." Lipshutz ended his review stating that Mars was one of the best live performers at the given moment. The Boston Globe's Sarah Rodman commented that the singer kept a high level of energy during the entire concert. She added, "much work, planning, and rehearsal went in to the show, but Mars made it look easy." Lillian Altman, writing for The AU Review, felt that "the chemistry between the nine performers was phenomenal," since the band enjoyed performing together and dancing and interacting with the public. Altman confessed that it was the first time she was walking home "singing and dancing in the streets" after attending a concert or festival as she listened to Mars's tracks on her iPod.

The Birmingham News's Mary Colurso complemented Mars's capacity to demonstrate "major charisma," his vocals, the band, and the dynamic atmosphere in the arena. Colurso commented that Mars might not have the most deep and breathtaking music, "but he certainly knows how to get the party started." Chris Richards of The Washington Post said that it was a "rare, thrilling, upside-down pop concert," because Mars did not try to recreate the gleam of his most successful tracks, instead he reshaped the songbook at his will, which Richards found amazing. The reviewer also mentioned the wide range of genres that Mars approached, including "Motown, new wave, late-’70s funk, and mid-’90s R&B" influenced by pop, which earned him various generations of admirers and fans. However, he criticized the singer for not claiming his own personality through all the "genre-jumping time travel" and for not adding the band name, The Hooligans, on the ticket. Jim Farber from the New York Daily News praised the concert as it tried to recreate 1970s era entertainment. The reviewer compared it to some acts of that period such as The Jacksons, The Tramps, and The Bee Gees. He compared the "purity, cream and range" of Mars's voice to "mid-period Michael Jackson." Farber regarded both Mars and Jackson as "pure entertainers." He noted that "it hardly seemed to matter that the show wasn't big on risk or depth."

John Serba of Booth Newspapers said that Mars lacks "the commanding presence of a superstar;" in contrast, he gives nothing but consistency. Serba highlighted the production, which he found outstanding and diverse. Robert Copsey from Digital Spy thought the concert had avoidably "long breakdowns and interludes." Fortunately, Mars's band added energy to those. Copsey considered it a small imperfection "in an otherwise stunning performance" from a singer who was just commencing his tours and shows. The New Zealand Herald's Bridget Jones dubbed the singer a "showman," as he was not only able to write a "catchy pop song and sing it impressively," but he also gave a pageant. Nevertheless, and considering his showmanship and prestige in the industry at this point, Jones disapproved of the "comedic set pieces" that were brought from the previous tour. Every critic noticed and praised Mars's drumming and guitar solos, but also the special effects.

=== Accolades ===
The Moonshine Jungle Tour was nominated for three Pollstar Awards, Most Creative Stage Production and Major Tour of the Year in 2013, and "Major Tour of the Year" again in 2014. In 2013, the tour led Mars to be nominated for Breakthrough and Eventful Fans' Choice categories at the Billboard Touring Conference and Awards. It was also nominated for Choice Summer Tour at the 2013 Teen Choice Awards.

Year	Award	Category	Result	Ref.
2013	Billboard Touring Conference and Awards	Breakthrough	Nominated	
2013	Billboard Touring Conference and Awards	Eventful Fans' Choice	Nominated	
2013	Pollstar Award	Most Creative Stage Production	Nominated	
2013	Pollstar Award	Major Tour of the Year	Nominated	
2013	Teen Choice Awards	Choice Summer Tour	Nominated	
2014	Pollstar Award	Major Tour of the Year	Nominated	

== Commercial performance ==
As soon as the tour was announced and in order to assure tickets were not over-priced, five cities were used as a "test." The result was promising as a minimum of 7,000 tickets sold per city. Such results could be due to the "huge success" of "Locked out of Heaven" and the Grammy performance. Despite the fact that these two factors could spike sales, in Mars's case "everything was very consistent." Eventually, most of the dates were sold out in North America. This high demand led to an announcement of more dates in several cities despite having chosen 44 dates to begin with, which, according to Marx, was "ambitious," since tours that go above 24 dates can result in a drop in sales. There were three main factors involved in scheduling dates: research of the market, optimism on what they thought they could sell, and how they opened up the arenas. A second date in Chicago could have been done, however they booked a date in Minneapolis, which culminated in a sold-out show. In Los Angeles, some shows coincided with the Jay Z and Justin Timberlake concerts. Furthermore, the tickets for Mars's show were only available one week after the Jay Z/Justin Timberlake tickets went on sale. Nevertheless, after the first sold out date in the city, a second date was scheduled and immediately sold out as well. Marx said that more dates could have been sold out in L.A, since they left at least 20,000 people in a "virtual waiting room" who could have bought tickets. All in all, and according to Marx, the team at WME was pleased with having sold 30,000 tickets, and decided to stop there.

Moreover, in Toronto there was a hold on the second date, but they ended up by re-launching and putting it on sale with 30,000 tickets being sold there. In Denver the first date was at Pepsi Center, though the arena was considered inadequate, therefore a second show was set at the Red Rocks Amphitheatre, which was chosen by the AEG team. Both shows were sold out in that day, with 18,000 tickets purchased. The only city where all the tickets were not sold was St. Louis at the Scottrade Center, since its capacity was increased to 16,000 and sold 14,000. However, Billboard reported 44 dates sold out of 48, totaling approximately 666,926 people and a gross of $46,417,795 after the conclusion of the first leg in North America. In Australia the concerts were scheduled for February 2014, tickets went on sale in April 2013, and by September 80% of the shows were sold out, including two dates in Sidney and in Melbourne, in arenas of 14,000 to 15,000 capacity. The total revenue was above $1 million per night in ticket sales. At that time nine dates were on sale and more were added. In New Zealand, Mars broke Vector Arena's house attendance record for a concert in "end stage" mode, with 12,142 people in attendance. The record in New Zealand contributed to a successful tour in Oceania with 10 sold-out arenas and a total attendance over 130,000. Overall, the Moonshine Jungle Tour was reported to have grossed over $156.4 million, with Billboard Boxscore reporting a gross of $136 million. (Note: See the total shows section.)

=== Super Bowl XLVIII halftime show and Bruno Mars act ===
After the Super Bowl XLVIII halftime show, which featured Mars as the headline act and the Red Hot Chili Peppers as the special guests, tickets for Mars's second North American tour were in high demand. He became the fastest entertainer to sell out three concerts at the Blaisdell Arena in Hawaii. Since the morning of February 3, 2014, many shows were sold out and only a few tickets were available on the primary market, and the average price of a ticket was around $500 on the secondary market. Ticketmaster also struggled to keep up with demand, having to switch from their interactive seating maps for most events. The price for tickets on the primary market ranged from $49 to $100, however in bigger cities the price was between $70 and $181. On the secondary market, tickets for big venues had a wider price range of $150 to $600. At these prices, Mars's tour ranked among the most expensive in the U.S. during the summer of 2014, ahead of One Direction and Jason Aldean shows, which had the highest prices for an American tour in the same period. Two months after the Super Bowl, 27 of the 48 dates booked for the second leg in North America were sold out on the primary market. The only tickets left for those shows were available on the secondary market for a lower price than after the game. Nevertheless, the tour became one of the most expensive of 2014 due to the latter market.

Due to the huge tickets reselling activities that occurred during the week after the Super Bowl, and in order to limit that kind of profiteering, in February 2014 Hawaii Senate President Donna Mercado Kim introduced Senate Resolution 12, also known as the "Bruno Mars Act." It limits all ticket purchases within 48 hours of the on-sale to the physical box office, therefore ensuring that anyone who goes to the box office to buy tickets for a concert will get one, dissuading ticket scalping. The State Senate in Hawaii passed the law. However, the bill died at the conference committee.

== Set lists ==
The set lists given below were performed in June 2013 and June 2014, respectively. The list evolved over the course of the tour, and sometimes included other numbers. These included "Count on Me", "The Lazy Song", "Let It Please Be You" by The Desires, Aaliyah’s "Rock the Boat", Mad Cobra's "Flex" and Lloyd’s "Secret Admirer".

1. "Moonshine"
2. "Natalie"
3. "Treasure"
4. "Money (That's What I Want)" / "Billionaire"
5. "Show Me"
6. "Candy Rain"
7. "Our First Time" / "Pony"
8. "Marry You"
9. "If I Knew"
10. "Runaway Baby"
11. "Young Girls"
12. "When I Was Your Man"
13. "Grenade"
14. "Just the Way You Are"

Encore

15. "Locked Out of Heaven"
16. "Gorilla"
1. "Moonshine"
2. "Natalie"
3. "Treasure"
4. "Money (That's What I Want)" / "Billionaire"
5. "Bam Bam" / "Show Me" / "Our First Time" / "Pony" / "Ignition (Remix)"
6. "Marry You"
7. "If I Knew" / "Nothin' on You"
8. "Runaway Baby"
9. "When I Was Your Man"
10. "Grenade"
11. "Just the Way You Are"

Encore

12. "Locked Out of Heaven"
13. "Gorilla"

== Shows ==
List of concerts, showing date, city, country, venue, opening act, tickets sold, number of available tickets and amount of gross revenueList of Leg 1 – North American concerts
Date (2013)	City	Country	Venue	Opening act	Attendance (Tickets sold / available)	Revenue
June 22	Washington, D.C.	United States	Verizon Center	Fitz and the Tantrums	15,404 / 15,404	$1,015,034
June 24	Philadelphia	United States	Wells Fargo Center	Fitz and the Tantrums	14,675 / 14,675	$1,116,984
June 26	Boston	United States	TD Garden	Fitz and the Tantrums	14,267 / 14,267	$1,030,157
June 27	Uncasville	United States	Mohegan Sun Arena	N/A	5,390 / 5,390	$434,410
June 29	Brooklyn	United States	Barclays Center	Fitz and the Tantrums	15,204 / 15,204	$1,252,521
July 1	Newark	United States	Prudential Center	Ellie Goulding	14,320 / 14,320	$1,247,263
July 2	Pittsburgh	United States	Consol Energy Center	Ellie Goulding	12,582 / 12,582	$758,991
July 3	Toronto	Canada	Molson Canadian Amphitheatre	Ellie Goulding	31,709 / 31,709	$2,134,130
July 5	Montreal	Canada	Bell Centre	Ellie Goulding	17,244 / 17,244	$1,086,275
July 6	Toronto	Canada	Molson Canadian Amphitheatre	Ellie Goulding	(Note: The score data are combined from the shows held at the Molson Canadian Amphitheatre on July 3 and 6.)	
July 8 (Note: The July 8, 2013 concert in Quebec City at the Plains of Abraham was a part of the Quebec City Summer Festival.)	Quebec City	Canada	Plains of Abraham	N/A	N/A	N/A
July 10	Columbus	United States	Value City Arena	Ellie Goulding	13,497 / 13,497	$915,670
July 11	Auburn Hills	United States	The Palace of Auburn Hills	Ellie Goulding	14,921 / 14,921	$962,368
July 13	Chicago	United States	United Center	Ellie Goulding	16,278 / 16,278	$1,326,517
July 14	St. Paul	United States	Xcel Energy Center	Ellie Goulding	15,451 / 15,451	$881,513
July 18	Edmonton	Canada	Rexall Place	Ellie Goulding	14,240 / 14,240	$903,412
July 20	Vancouver	Canada	Rogers Arena	Ellie Goulding	15,533 / 15,533	$1,106,306
July 21	Seattle	United States	KeyArena	Ellie Goulding	13,234 / 13,234	$923,591
July 22	Portland	United States	Rose Garden Arena	Ellie Goulding	12,639 / 12,639	$819,834
July 24	Sacramento	United States	Sleep Train Arena	Ellie Goulding	13,720 / 13,720	$1,004,743
July 25	San Jose	United States	SAP Center	Ellie Goulding	14,163 / 14,163	$1,252,328
July 27	Los Angeles	United States	Staples Center	Ellie Goulding	30,360 / 30,360	$2,734,649
July 28	Los Angeles	United States	Staples Center	Ellie Goulding	30,360 / 30,360	$2,734,649
July 30	San Diego	United States	Valley View Casino Center	Ellie Goulding	12,263 / 12,263	$800,820
July 31	Phoenix	United States	US Airways Center	Ellie Goulding	14,654 / 14,654	$802,562
August 2	West Valley City	United States	Maverik Center	Fitz and the Tantrums	10,263 / 10,263	$702,566
August 3	Las Vegas	United States	MGM Grand Garden Arena	Fitz and the Tantrums	13,850 / 13,850	$1,559,042
August 5	Morrison	United States	Red Rocks Amphitheatre	Ellie Goulding	18,836 / 18,836	$1,164,434
August 6	Morrison	United States	Red Rocks Amphitheatre	Ellie Goulding	18,836 / 18,836	$1,164,434
August 8	St. Louis	United States	Scottrade Center	Ellie Goulding	13,947 / 13,947	$950,707
August 9	Kansas City	United States	Sprint Center	Ellie Goulding	14,492 / 14,492	$1,069,533
August 10	Oklahoma City	United States	Chesapeake Energy Arena	Ellie Goulding	13,179 / 13,179	$784,452
August 12	Dallas	United States	American Airlines Center	Ellie Goulding	15,489 / 15,489	$1,016,202
August 14	Austin	United States	Frank Erwin Center	Ellie Goulding	13,432 / 13,700	$781,396
August 15	Houston	United States	Toyota Center	Ellie Goulding	13,425 / 13,425	$964,969
August 17	Nashville	United States	Bridgestone Arena	Fitz and the Tantrums	14,828 / 14,828	$824,838
August 18	Louisville	United States	KFC Yum! Center	Fitz and the Tantrums	14,282 / 14,282	$951,382
August 19	Indianapolis	United States	Bankers Life Fieldhouse	Fitz and the Tantrums	9,300 / 9,300	$618,118
August 21	Charlotte	United States	Time Warner Cable Arena	Fitz and the Tantrums	11,612 / 11,612	$671,936
August 22	Atlanta	United States	Philips Arena	Fitz and the Tantrums	13,080 / 13,080	$906,482
August 27	Orlando	United States	Amway Center	Fitz and the Tantrums	13,634 / 13,828	$842,960
August 28	Tampa	United States	Tampa Bay Times Forum	Fitz and the Tantrums	12,292 / 12,292	$797,952
August 30	Miami	United States	American Airlines Arena	Fitz and the Tantrums	16,136 / 16,136	$1,201,516
September 1	San Juan	Puerto Rico	Coliseo de Puerto Rico	N/A	15,669 / 15,669	$1,033,100

List of Leg 2 – European concerts
Date (2013)	City	Country	Venue	Opening act	Attendance (Tickets sold / available)	Revenue
October 2	Belfast	Northern Ireland	Odyssey Arena	Mayer Hawthorne	N/A	N/A
October 3	Dublin	Ireland	The O_{2}	Mayer Hawthorne	N/A	N/A
October 5	Manchester	England	Phones 4u Arena	Mayer Hawthorne	17,414 / 17,670	$1,079,580
October 6	Glasgow	Scotland	SSE Hydro	Mayer Hawthorne	N/A	N/A
October 8	London	England	The O_{2} Arena	Mayer Hawthorne	34,777 / 35,242	$2,206,080
October 9	London	England	The O_{2} Arena	Mayer Hawthorne	34,777 / 35,242	$2,206,080
October 11	Birmingham	England	National Indoor Arena	Mayer Hawthorne	N/A	N/A
October 12	Sheffield	England	Motorpoint Arena Sheffield	Mayer Hawthorne	N/A	N/A
October 14	Paris	France	Palais Omnisports de Paris-Bercy	Mayer Hawthorne	N/A	N/A
October 15	Amsterdam	Netherlands	Ziggo Dome	Mayer Hawthorne	N/A	N/A
October 17	Antwerp	Belgium	Sportpaleis	Mayer Hawthorne	N/A	N/A
October 18	Esch-sur-Alzette	Luxembourg	Rockhal	Mayer Hawthorne	N/A	N/A
October 20	Mannheim	Germany	SAP Arena	Mayer Hawthorne	N/A	N/A
October 22	Stuttgart	Germany	Hanns-Martin-Schleyer-Halle	Mayer Hawthorne	N/A	N/A
October 23	Zürich	Switzerland	Hallenstadion	Mayer Hawthorne	13,490 / 13,490	$1,119,810
October 24	Vienna	Austria	Wiener Stadthalle	Mayer Hawthorne	N/A	N/A
October 26	Milan	Italy	Mediolanum Forum	Mayer Hawthorne	N/A	N/A
October 28	Berlin	Germany	O_{2} World Berlin	Mayer Hawthorne	14,146 / 14,146	$839,274
October 29	Hamburg	Germany	O_{2} World Hamburg	Mayer Hawthorne	13,091 / 13,542	$741,753
October 31	Copenhagen	Denmark	Forum Copenhagen	Mayer Hawthorne	N/A	N/A
November 2	Oslo	Norway	Oslo Spektrum	Mayer Hawthorne	N/A	N/A
November 3	Stockholm	Sweden	Ericsson Globe	Mayer Hawthorne	N/A	N/A
November 6	Prague	Czech Republic	O_{2} Arena	Mayer Hawthorne	N/A	N/A
November 7	Budapest	Hungary	Budapest Sports Arena	Mayer Hawthorne	N/A	N/A
November 11	Düsseldorf	Germany	ISS Dome	Mayer Hawthorne	N/A	N/A
November 12	Munich	Germany	Olympiahalle	Mayer Hawthorne	N/A	N/A
November 14	Badalona	Spain	Palau Municipal d'Esports	Mayer Hawthorne	N/A	N/A
November 15	Madrid	Spain	Palacio Vistalegre	Mayer Hawthorne	N/A	N/A
November 16	Lisbon	Portugal	MEO Arena	Mayer Hawthorne	N/A	N/A
November 18	Marseille	France	Le Dôme de Marseille	Mayer Hawthorne	N/A	N/A
November 19	Toulouse	France	Le Zénith de Toulouse	Mayer Hawthorne	N/A	N/A
November 21	London	England	The O_{2} Arena	Mayer Hawthorne	17,390 / 17,741	$1,107,940
November 22	Nottingham	England	Capital FM Arena	Mayer Hawthorne	N/A	N/A
November 24	Liverpool	England	Echo Arena Liverpool	Mayer Hawthorne	N/A	N/A
November 25	Newcastle	England	Metro Radio Arena	Mayer Hawthorne	N/A	N/A

List of Leg 3 – Oceania and Leg 4 – Asian concerts
Date (2014)	City	Country	Venue	Opening act	Attendance (Tickets sold / available)	Revenue
February 28	Perth	Australia	Perth Arena	Miguel	14,594 / 14,594	$1,675,690
March 2	Adelaide	Australia	Adelaide Entertainment Centre	Miguel	N/A	N/A
March 4	Melbourne	Australia	Rod Laver Arena	Miguel	26,573 / 26,573	$2,998,750
March 5	Melbourne	Australia	Rod Laver Arena	Miguel	26,573 / 26,573	$2,998,750
March 8	Sydney	Australia	Sydney Entertainment Centre	Miguel	10,503 / 10,679	$1,234,960
March 10	Sydney	Australia	Allphones Arena	Miguel	32,136 / 32,136	$3,714,430
March 11	Sydney	Australia	Allphones Arena	Miguel	32,136 / 32,136	$3,714,430
March 13 (Note: The March 13, 2014 performance at the Brisbane Entertainment Centre in Brisbane was originally scheduled to take place on March 7, 2014 but was postponed due to illness.)	Brisbane	Australia	Brisbane Entertainment Centre	Miguel	11,746 / 13,011	$1,327,680
March 15	Auckland	New Zealand	Vector Arena	Miguel	N/A	N/A
March 16	Auckland	New Zealand	Vector Arena	Miguel	N/A	N/A
March 20	Bangkok	Thailand	Impact Arena	N/A	N/A	N/A
March 22	Pasay	Philippines	Mall of Asia Arena	Poreotics	N/A	N/A
March 24	Jakarta	Indonesia	MEIS Ancol	N/A	N/A	N/A
March 26	Singapore		Singapore Indoor Stadium	N/A	N/A	N/A
March 29	Hong Kong		AsiaWorld–Arena	N/A	N/A	N/A
March 30	Hong Kong		AsiaWorld–Arena	N/A	N/A	N/A
April 1	Taipei	Taiwan	Taipei World Trade Center	N/A	N/A	N/A
April 3	Shanghai	China	Mercedes-Benz Arena	N/A	N/A	N/A
April 5	Beijing	China	MasterCard Center	N/A	N/A	N/A
April 8	Seoul	South Korea	Olympic Gymnastics Arena	N/A	N/A	N/A
April 10	Osaka	Japan	Osaka Municipal Central Gymnasium	N/A	N/A	N/A
April 12	Chiba	Japan	Makuhari Messe 7・8 Hall	N/A	N/A	N/A
April 13	Chiba	Japan	Makuhari Messe 7・8 Hall	N/A	N/A	N/A

List of Leg 5 – Oceanian and North American and Leg 6 – European concerts
Date (2014)	City	Country	Venue	Opening act	Attendance (Tickets sold / available)	Revenue
April 18	Honolulu	United States	Blaisdell Arena	The Green	21,877 / 21,877	$2,027,337
April 19	Honolulu	United States	Blaisdell Arena	The Green	21,877 / 21,877	$2,027,337
April 21	Honolulu	United States	Blaisdell Arena	The Green	21,877 / 21,877	$2,027,337
May 27	Fresno	United States	Save Mart Center	Aloe Blacc	12,945 / 12,945	$1,012,792
May 28	Oakland	United States	Oracle Arena	Aloe Blacc	15,873 / 15,873	$1,363,953
May 31	Los Angeles	United States	Hollywood Bowl	N/A	N/A	N/A
June 1	Los Angeles	United States	Hollywood Bowl	N/A	N/A	N/A
June 4	Tulsa	United States	BOK Center	Aloe Blacc	14,078 / 14,078	$1,019,935
June 6	Memphis	United States	FedEx Forum	Aloe Blacc	13,837 / 13,837	$990,937
June 7	New Orleans	United States	Smoothie King Center	Aloe Blacc	15,154 / 15,154	$1,089,456
June 10	North Little Rock	United States	Verizon Arena	Aloe Blacc	15,117 / 15,117	$1,026,814
June 11	Birmingham	United States	BJCC Arena	Aloe Blacc	13,653 / 13,653	$1,035,825
June 13	Columbia	United States	Colonial Life Arena	Aloe Blacc	14,106 / 14,106	$1,075,985
June 14	Raleigh	United States	PNC Arena	Aloe Blacc; Pharrell Williams	15,149 / 15,149	$1,189,724
June 17	Grand Rapids	United States	Van Andel Arena	Aloe Blacc	11,412 / 11,412	$949,422
June 18	Auburn Hills	United States	The Palace of Auburn Hills	Aloe Blacc	14,046 / 14,046	$1,206,323
June 20	Tinley Park	United States	First Midwest Bank Amphitheatre	Aloe Blacc	28,304 / 28,304	$1,690,359
June 21	Saint Paul	United States	Xcel Energy Center	Aloe Blacc	15,344 / 15,344	$1,356,478
June 23	Omaha	United States	CenturyLink Center Omaha	Aloe Blacc	14,961 / 14,961	$1,192,265
June 25	Milwaukee	United States	Marcus Amphitheater	Aloe Blacc	N/A	N/A
June 27	Cincinnati	United States	U.S. Bank Arena	Aloe Blacc	13,888 / 13,888	$1,058,887
June 28	Cleveland	United States	Quicken Loans Arena	Aloe Blacc	15,936 / 15,936	$1,263,059
June 30	Buffalo	United States	First Niagara Center	Aloe Blacc	15,868 / 15,868	$1,255,331
July 2	Boston	United States	TD Garden	Aloe Blacc	14,450 / 14,450	$1,389,163
July 5 (Note: The July 5, 2014 concert in London and the July 6, 2014 concert in Birmingham are parts of the Wireless Festival.)	Birmingham	England	Perry Park	N/A	N/A	N/A
July 6	London	England	Finsbury Park	N/A	N/A	N/A

List of Leg 7 – North American concert
Date (2014)	City	Country	Venue	Opening act	Attendance (Tickets sold / available)	Revenue
July 9	Hartford	United States	Xfinity Theatre	Aloe Blacc	15,067 / 15,067	$964,116
July 11	Bristow	United States	Jiffy Lube Live	Aloe Blacc	22,488 / 22,488	$1,473,007
July 12	Hershey	United States	Hersheypark Stadium	Aloe Blacc	27,351 / 27,351	$1,920,663
July 14	New York City	United States	Madison Square Garden	Pharrell Williams	31,434 / 31,434	$3,453,499
July 15	New York City	United States	Madison Square Garden	Pharrell Williams	31,434 / 31,434	$3,453,499
July 17	Camden	United States	Susquehanna Bank Center	Aloe Blacc	21,146 / 21,146	$1,185,164
July 18	Manchester	United States	Verizon Wireless Arena	Aloe Blacc	9,378 / 9,378	$768,940
July 20	Albany	United States	Times Union Center	Aloe Blacc	12,704 / 12,704	$1,078,273
July 23	Montreal	Canada	Bell Centre	Bebe Rexha	17,919 / 17,919	$1,458,439
July 24	Ottawa	Canada	Canadian Tire Centre	Nico & Vinz	15,129 / 15,129	$1,141,477
July 26	Toronto	Canada	Air Canada Centre	Nico & Vinz	34,715 / 34,715	$3,214,048
July 27	Toronto	Canada	Air Canada Centre	Nico & Vinz	34,715 / 34,715	$3,214,048
August 2	Winnipeg	Canada	MTS Centre	Nico & Vinz	12,853 / 12,853	$905,240
August 3	Saskatoon	Canada	Credit Union Centre	Nico & Vinz	13,660 / 13,660	$952,397
August 5	Calgary	Canada	Scotiabank Saddledome	Nico & Vinz	14,390 / 14,390	$890,864
August 8 (Note: The August 8, 2014 concert in Squamish at the Logger Sports Grounds is a part of the Squamish Valley Music Festival.)	Squamish	Canada	Logger Sports Grounds	N/A	N/A	N/A
August 9	George	United States	The Gorge	Nico & Vinz	22,081 / 22,081	$1,326,904
August 11	Eugene	United States	Matthew Knight Arena	Nico & Vinz	10,367 / 10,367	$806,770
August 14	Lake Tahoe	United States	Harveys Outdoor Arena	Nico & Vinz	7,586 / 7,586	$737,463
August 15	San Jose	United States	SAP Center	Nico & Vinz	15,049 / 15,049	$1,445,749
August 17	Greenwood Village	United States	Fiddler's Green Amphitheatre	N/A	N/A	N/A
August 30 (Note: The August 30, 2014 performance in Willemstad at the Piscadera Bay is a part of the "Curaçao North Sea Jazz Festival".)	Willemstad	Curaçao	Piscadera Bay	N/A	N/A	N/A
September 2	Mexico City	Mexico	Mexico City Arena	N/A	N/A	N/A
September 3	Mexico City	Mexico	Mexico City Arena	N/A	N/A	N/A
September 5	Monterrey	Mexico	Arena Monterrey	N/A	N/A	N/A
September 6	Monterrey	Mexico	Arena Monterrey	N/A	N/A	N/A
October 4 (Note: The October 4, 2014 performance in Santo Domingo at the Estadio Olímpico Félix Sánchez is a part of the Festival Presidente de la Musica Latina.)	Santo Domingo	Dominican Republic	Estadio Olímpico Félix Sánchez	N/A	N/A	N/A
Totals for tour					1,379,841 / 1,383,267	$136,289,287

== Personnel ==
Credits adapted from several sources:

The Hooligans

- Bruno Mars – vocals
- Philip Lawrence – backup vocals
- Phredley Brown – lead guitar and backup vocals
- Jamareo Artis – bass guitar
- Eric Hernandez – drums
- Kameron Whalum – trombone
- Dwayne Dugger – saxophone
- James King – trumpet
- John Fossitt – keyboard

Production

- James Berry – live audio mixing, monitors
- Cameron Duddy – creative direction (2014 North American tour)
- Derek Brener – front of house engineer
- Jeff Hargrove – system technician
- Charles Moniz – recording engineer
- Eric Rodstol – monitor technician
- Austin Dudley – PA technician
- Mike Gamble – PA technician
- Cory FitzGerald – lighting designer
- LeRoy Bennett – lighting designer
- Dave Marcucci – lighting director

Management

- Shaun Hoffman – tour manager
- John Marx – personal management, for William Morris Endeavor (WME)
- Sara Newkirk Simon – management, for WME
- Tony Goldring – international booking
- Michele Bernstein – management, for WME
- Ben Totis – management, for WME
- Joel Forman – production manager, for WME
- Brandon Creed – personal management, for Creed Company
- Kevin Beisler – management, for Creed company
- Rob Bonstein – management, for Creed company
- Tom Moffatt – promoter, for Tom Moffatt Production (at least in Hawaii)
