= Locked Out of Heaven =

2012 single by Bruno Mars

Single by Bruno Mars

from the album Unorthodox Jukebox
- Released: October 1, 2012
- Studio: Levcon (Los Angeles, California); Daptone (Brooklyn, New York); Avatar (New York City)
- Genre: Reggae rock; pop rock
- Length: 3:53
- Label: Atlantic
- Songwriters: Bruno Mars; Philip Lawrence; Ari Levine
- Producers: The Smeezingtons; Mark Ronson; Jeff Bhasker; Emile Haynie

Bruno Mars singles chronology
"Count On Me" (2011)	"Locked Out of Heaven" (2012)	"When I Was Your Man" (2013)

Music video
- "Locked Out of Heaven" on YouTube

"Locked Out of Heaven" is a song by American singer and songwriter Bruno Mars from his second studio album, Unorthodox Jukebox (2012). It was released as the lead single from the album on October 1, 2012. The song was written by Mars, Philip Lawrence and Ari Levine. It was produced by the former three, under their alias, the Smeezingtons along with Mark Ronson, Jeff Bhasker and Emile Haynie. "Locked Out of Heaven" is a reggae rock and pop rock song influenced by new wave and funk. The song's lyrics are about the rapturous feelings brought about by a relationship infused with positive emotion as well as euphoria from sex.

"Locked Out of Heaven" was well received by most critics, some of whom complimented Mars's different musical direction. His vocals were compared to the ones by Sting, while its sound was lauded, with the song being called "interesting" and a "musical evolution". While some critics noted influences from various bands, Mars stated that the Police were the ones who influenced him to write the song. The single charted inside the top ten in various countries, including the United States, where it became Mars's fourth number-one single on the Billboard Hot 100, holding the spot for six consecutive weeks, and topping the Canadian Hot 100 for three consecutive weeks. "Locked Out of Heaven" was certified diamond by the Recording Industry Association of America (RIAA) and by Music Canada (MC), seven times platinum by the Australian Recording Industry Association (ARIA) and eight times platinum by Recorded Music NZ (RMNZ).

The song's music video was shot by director Cameron Duddy and by Mars. It depicts Mars and his bandmates leisurely engaging in activities such as smoking, drinking and playing games. The singer performed "Locked Out of Heaven" on television shows such as Saturday Night Live and The X Factor and included it on all his tours since 2013, but An Evening with Silk Sonic at Park MGM (2022). It was also used at his Super Bowl XLVIII halftime show set list. The song won several awards and received three Grammy nominations. The song has also been covered by various recording artists, including Leona Lewis and Bastille.

== Background and production ==
After the 2010 debut album Doo-Wops & Hooligans, Bruno Mars revealed he wanted to create something unexpected with its follow-up. "This is me going into the studio and recording and writing whatever I want," Mars said confidently. "This album represents my freedom." It all started backstage, after a show, during a jamming session in a "greenroom", while singing the phrase "Locked Out of Heaven". According to Philip Lawrence, the track developed a meaning as they started to write it, "when you’re with someone who's showing you a new way to love." The Smeezingtons went to New York to work with Jeff Bhasker, Emile Haynie and Mark Ronson and during a jamming session with drums, bass, and guitar, Mars created the riff of the song. He started singing the chorus previously created on the top of the riff. Then, the production team went back to L.A., where they finished the lyrics and changed the original melody. Lawrence felt that the recording was "sort of empty but it had a carnal vibe to it", making them enthusiastic to place a "driving rhythm" in it. He recalled thinking it was "something special" in the studio, the same way he did during the creation of "Just the Way You Are" and "Billionaire" (2010).

Bhasker, one of the song's producers, explained the track's roots as it "came in the middle of the process of putting together the album". He elaborated; "We were just having a jam session, tracking some things, and Bruno started playing this groove and making up something on the spot; we all thought it was pretty good. We wound up working a long time on that, trying to get it just right." "Locked Out of Heaven" began as a "cha-cha-style duet", sounding like Santana's "Smooth". Ronson asked the Dap-Kings to collaborate on the track in order to get a "crisply syncopated, locked-in groove." According to Michael Leonhart, he contributed with "Thriller" vibe horns to the song, however, they didn't make the final version. Regarding the development of the song, the Smeezingtons thought "there's a good pocket on this song right now. Let's keep it going." Mars also mentioned that it took a long time to create it, commenting "People didn't see us going at each other's throats in the studio and pulling out our hair." He added, "Trying to get these drums right and figure out a bass line." Lawrence believes the lack of "heavy hitting drums" and the presence of a small guitar solo allows the song to be carried by Mars.

"Locked Out of Heaven" was written by Mars, Lawrence and Ari Levine. Its production was handled by the former three, under their stage name, the Smeezingtons, alongside Ronson, Bhasker, and Haynie. Bhasker, Mars, Nick Movshon, and Homer Steinweiss played the instruments, with additional assistance by Haynie. The recording was done by Levine, Wayne Gordon, ALALAL and Ronson, while Bob Mallory and Tyler Hartman served as the recording assistants for the latter two. Recording took place at the Levcon Studios in Los Angeles, Daptone Studios in Brooklyn and Avatar Studios in New York. Charles Moniz provided additional engineering to the recording. It was mixed at Larrabee Sound Studios in Hollywood by Manny Marroquin and mastered by David Kutch at The Mastering Place.

== Release ==
According to Ronson, Mars wanted "Locked Out of Heaven" to be the lead single, which he considered a "brave" choice. Aaron Bay-Schuck, Mars's A&R representative at the time, found the track's production to be cutting edge, although it wasn't an instant favorite. However, he perceived that "it was something special" but had no idea how to classify it. Bay-Schuck felt the song needed time to grow as "the more you hear it, the more of an earworm it becomes", leading the promotional department to make sure that program directors weren't afraid of playing a track that "sounded different from what was on the radio".

"Locked Out of Heaven" was unveiled digitally and sent to radio airplay on October 1, 2012, as the lead single from Unorthodox Jukebox. It also became available for purchase the following day, and it was officially sent to American contemporary hit radio by Atlantic Records and for radio airplay in Italy by Warner. The label also sent the song to rhythmic contemporary on October 25, 2012. It was made available to purchase as a digital download in Germany on October 3, 2012. In early November 2013, a CD Single was released on Poland, Germany, Austria and Switzerland, it included the album version of "Locked Out of Heaven", as well as a poster and stickers of Bruno Mars. The song was released as an available download on November 21, 2012, in Japan. On November 26, 2012, the song was released as a digital download in the United Kingdom. On January 21, 2013, four remixes were released for download in the UK.

== Composition and influences ==
"Locked Out of Heaven"
A 23-second sample of the "Locked Out of Heaven" chorus about a great relationship over the reggae rock and pop rock beat.

The sheet music for "Locked Out of Heaven" shows the key of D minor, with the vocals ranging from the low note of A_{3} to the high note of C_{5}. Levine said that some parts of the song are assembled from vocals, not instruments; Mars said they needed "a dep-dep-dep-dep sound". Mars's voice was recorded, chopped up and processed to sound like an instrument. The song's composition relies mainly on a "guitar-worthy groove guitar, a soaring sing-along chorus and sexual innuendo galore". It finds Mars singing a confession of a relationship that is so good that he repeats to his love "Your sex takes me to paradise", a verse inspired by Halle Berry; "You make me feel like I've been locked out of heaven for too long/ Can I just stay here, spend the rest of my days here?" he sings. During his Google Hangout on the day of the song's release, Mars was asked by a fan to name his favorite lyrics from the track. Mars picked the phrase "But swimming in your water is something spiritual", and said that the single's exploration of feeling and being in love fits into the "sensual, sensual and sensual" theme of the album.

"Hell yeah! You try to write a Police song!. I grew up listening to The Police, I grew up performing in bars, singing Police songs ... I remember performing a song like 'Roxanne', and you play those first couple of chords, and you hit that first note, and you watch the whole bar ignite. And as an artist, as a songwriter, it's like 'Man, I want to write a song that makes people's eyes explode the first chord!'."

— Mars talking about the Police influence on the track.

It has been described as a reggae rock and pop rock track heavily influenced by new wave and funk. Tim Sendra of AllMusic described the song as "a breezy mashup of 'Beat It' (1982), the Police, and Dire Straits." For Paul MacInnes of The Guardian called it "a brazen – but successful – welding of Dire Straits' 'Sultans of Swing' (1978) and 'Can't Stand Losing You' (1978) by the Police." Carl Williott of Idolator found out that "the angular guitars and Mars' Sting-like staccato delivery are heavily indebted to The Police," also seeing "hints of Foster the People on the omnipresent 'eh-eh-eh-eh-ooo' punctuating the beat." Melinda Newman of HitFix commented that the song has a "Police/'80s rock skipping beat plus a touch of the Romantics' 'What I Like About You' (1980)." Mikael Wood of the Los Angeles Times likened it to the Police era Ghost in the Machine (1981) heavily influenced by Human League. Jon Caramanica of The New York Times simply called it "a vivid carbon copy of Zenyatta Mondatta (1980)-era Police."

Though critics have pointed out the song's similarities to some of the hits by the Police, Mars told MTV News that he did not intend to write anything mimicking by the Sting-fronted band. Instead, it came to him out of the blue, one night during his studio sessions prior to recording the Unorthodox Jukebox album. "I don't think it initially tried to sound like anybody else, but I picked up the guitar and just started playing [the song's opening chords]," Mars explained. "That's how it normally works; I'll pick up a guitar and I'll start humming a melody, and I started singing that, and I was up there in Sting-ville, in that register, so that's what you get...". John Marx, a partner in the music division at William Morris Endeavor (WME), who was responsible for managing The Moonshine Jungle Tour said "it's the type of song that really motivates people to purchase a ticket. It has that live element to it; it was a very active track".

== Critical reception ==
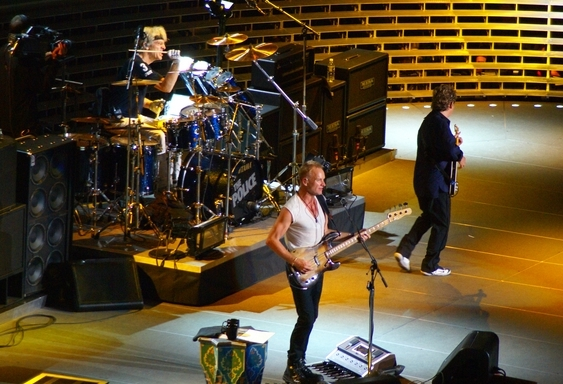
The majority of music critics noted similarities between "Locked Out of Heaven" to a handful of tracks by the English rock band The Police (pictured). Later, Mars admitted that the song was inspired by the band.

The song received generally positive reviews from music critics. Robert Copsey of Digital Spy was positive, giving the song a rating of 5 out of 5 stars, praising the "80s-styled funk beats and wildly infectious percussion", the "singalong chorus may be a hasty reminder that his strength lies in fist-clenching". He also wrote that considered the song "one of the most interesting musical evolutions of 2012." Jody Rosen of Rolling Stone gave the song 3.5 out of 5 stars, writing that "The song is about unbridled passion, but as usual with Mars, the aesthetic is tidy and impeccable, pop songcraft polished to a high-gloss gleam: jittery Police-esque rock-reggae verses that erupt, amid thunder-boom synths, into a steamrolling four-on-the-floor chorus." Carl Williott of Idolator also gave the song a positive review, writing that it "shows an interesting musical evolution," and called the song "interesting" and marks it as a shift for Mars and his style.

Ryan Reed of Paste Magazine called it "a driving pop anthem that moves from a punchy, 'Roxanne'-esque new-wave groove to a soulful, synth-driven chorus." Matt Cibula of PopMatters further explained, writing, "It starts out like an early Police single, with some straight-up Reggatta de Blanc syncopation and a shockingly good Sting vocal impression. But the chorus opens up to turn into something less Police-y and more, dare I say it, Bruno Mars-y." Kitty Empire of The Observer wrote that the song "channels the Police, but its 21st-century builds owe as much to rave-pop as they do to producer Mark Ronson. It's an ill-omened meeting that somehow gels." Jason Lipshut of Billboard gave a very positive review, stating that the song is "Mars's best solo single to date, with the singer-songwriter yelping about fornication as a tossed salad of chopped guitars and vocal exclamations buttress his sumptuous leading-man act. Sometimes, the perfect lead single is hard to find; other times, it walks right up to you and delivers a big, cozy hug." Melinda Newman of HitFix praised "Mars' singing and the catchy little background vocals," which according to her, "keep the song moving downstream at a rapid pace." She also noted that "Even clumsy lyrics like 'your sex takes me to paradise' can't diminish that joy that the beats and melody bring."

=== Accolades ===
"Locked Out of Heaven" received several nominations, including Outstanding Song at the 2013 NAACP Image Awards. It was nominated for Top Radio Song and Top Pop Song at the 2013 Billboard Music Awards. The single received a nomination at the 2013 MTV Millennial Awards for International Hit of the Year. In the same year, "Locked Out of Heaven" received the accolade for Top 10 Gold International Gold Songs at the RTHK International Pop Poll. It also received a nomination for Choice Single: Male Artist award at the 2013 Teen Choice Awards. At the 2013 MTV Europe Music Awards, it won the award Best Song, the only category it was nominated. In December 2013, the song was nominated at Los Premios 40 Principales 2013 for Best International Song. The song was one of the several winners of the 2014 ASCAP Pop Music Awards for Most Performed Songs. In 2014, "Locked Out of Heaven" received nominations for Record of the Year, Song of the Year and Best Remixed Recording, Non-Classical for its Sultan + Ned Shepard remix at the 56th Annual Grammy Awards, but did not win for any. In 2015, the recording was also nominated for Outstanding Creative Achievement in the category of Record Production/Single or Track at the TEC Awards. The Village Voice's annual year-end Pazz & Jop critics' poll selected it as the 25th best song of 2012, tying with five other songs.

== Commercial performance ==
=== North America ===
In the United States, "Locked Out of Heaven" debuted at number 34 on the Billboard Hot 100 and sold 92,000 copies in its first week. In its fourth week, on the chart, "Locked Out of Heaven" climbed to number seven, becoming Mars's ninth Hot 100 top 10 in only two years. On December 22, 2012, the song replaced Rihanna's "Diamonds" on top of the Billboard Hot 100 chart, becoming Mars's fourth Hot 100 topper since his arrival in 2010. This ascension to the top marked the fastest collection of a male artist's first four number-ones in 48 years, only surpassed by Bobby Vinton. "Locked Out of Heaven" charted for a second consecutive week atop the Hot 100, with Mars becoming one of nine male soloists in the Hot 100's 54-year history to tally at least two weeks on top with each of his first four leaders. On its third consecutive week on the top, the song was the first to lead all the four tallies (Hot 100, Radio Songs, Digital Songs, On-Demand Songs) simultaneously. The song spent six consecutive weeks at the top, becoming the second longest-reigning of Mars's eight number-one singles (since surpassed by "Uptown Funk", which topped the chart for fourteen consecutive weeks in 2015).

On the Mainstream Top 40 chart, "Locked Out of Heaven" debuted at number 26, extending a streak begun with his featured single, "Nothin' on You", in 2011, and marking the longest such career-opening streak among male artists in the chart's 20-year history. When "Locked Out of Heaven" climbed to number seven in its sixth week on the Radio Songs it became his ninth consecutive top ten, also in a streak beginning with the aforementioned song. It extended his record among men. The song also debuted on the Adult Pop Songs at number 26, marking the highest entrance by a solo male since Rob Thomas debuted at number 20 with "Lonely No More". "Locked Out of Heaven" was certified diamond by the Recording Industry Association of America (RIAA). As of December 16, 2012, the song became the first track to be streamed more than a million times in a one-week period on Spotify and it also became the most-streamed in Spotify's history at the time. In Canada, the song peaked at number one on Canadian Hot 100, becoming Mars's third single to reach number one on the chart. It also peaked at number one on Canada AC and was certified diamond by Music Canada (MC).

=== Europe and Oceania ===
"Locked Out of Heaven" made its first chart appearance in Spain and France on October 6, 2012, where it debuted at number 35 and 85, respectively. In Spain and France, the song kept fluctuating on the chart for the next couple of weeks, until it peaked at number three in both countries. In the UK, the song peaked at number two, on the week ending 24 November 2012. It has reached a total of 1,109,451 combined sales (863,122 purchases and 246,329 streaming-equivalent sales) in the United Kingdom as of September 2017 and was certified four times platinum by the British Phonographic Industry (BPI). In Italy, the song peaked at number three and was certified three times platinum by the Federazione Industria Musicale Italiana (FIMI). "Locked Out of Heaven" became Mars's fifth top-fifteen single in Denmark, peaking at number two. It peaked at number six in Sweden and was certified three times platinum by the Swedish Recording Industry Association (GLF).

"Locked Out of Heaven" entered the New Zealand Singles Chart at number 23 on October 15, 2012. After five weeks the song entered the top ten, at number eight, remaining for two weeks. Eventually, the song peaked at number four after four weeks. The single has received a eight-times platinum certification from the Recording Industry Association of New Zealand (RMNZ). "Locked Out of Heaven" debuted at number 21 on the Australian Singles Chart on October 21, 2012. The song reached a peak of number four on November 11, 2012. It was certified seven times platinum by the Australian Recording Industry Association (ARIA).

== Music video ==
=== Development ===
Cameron Duddy affirmed he gave Mars various "wacky story lines". Nevertheless, the singer wanted to record a "performance video" as it demonstrated a "hard-rocking image". The music video was filmed using "an old VHS camera", with Mars and The Hooligans performing, and playing along with the single live multiple times. This allowed Duddy to record the "feel of a live performance". He added that Mars "wanted it to feel as if someone's dad filmed it". Mars said, "The concept is just old-fashioned fun. No story line, it's not me singing to a girl, you get a good sense of what you're going to get live ... It's very VHS-y. I love that man, it takes me back to my childhood, when the tracking is off and the color is off, there's a beauty in that."

=== Synopsis ===
The song's music video was directed by Duddy and Mars and was released on October 15, 2012. The concept of the video shows Mars having a good time with his bandmates, doing things like smoking, drinking beer and playing games. He is also seen singing the song with his band at a club. The video has a vintage style reminiscent of VHS tapes.

Hugh McIntire of Billboard explained the video, writing, "Everything about "Locked Out of Heaven" – whether it be the video or the track itself – is retro. While the song references the early discography of The Police, the video takes us back a little bit further. From the style of their dress and the wonky-TV effects on the video, one might guess that Bruno and his friends are partying in the '70s. Only the Akai MPC sampler being played by a band member reminds the viewer that this video is, in fact, modern."

=== Reception ===
Idolator reviewer Sam Lansky wrote that Mars is "serving up all kinds of retro flavor in the clip for that song, which eschews the higher-concept vibe of his other videos (dancing monkeys in 'The Lazy Song') for a mellower vibe", adding that the video is "all filtered with Instagram-evoking effects that give it the grainy feel of an old tape." Rolling Stone, commented that the video takes place "in a dingy club", however, "the real attraction here are the grainy visuals filmed in fake fuzziness, giving the clip a retro feel." Chris Martins of Spin magazine said the video's vintage style "may be slightly off since the [song] sounds far more Sting than Curtis Mayfield", but regarded it as "a good one nonetheless."

The music video for the song received multiple awards and nominations. In 2013, it received a nomination for Outstanding Music Video at the NAACP Image Award. At the 2013 MTV Video Music Awards Japan, the visual received three nominations for Best Male Video, Video of the Year and Best Karaokee! Song. It also received nominations for Video of the Year, Best Pop Video and Best Male Video, winning the latter at the 2013 MTV Video Music Awards. The video received a nomination for Best International Video, a category decided by a Jury at the 2013 Los Premios Principales.

== Live performances ==
Mars first performed the song live on Saturday Night Live on October 20, 2012. His performance was well received by critics. Rolling Stone magazine wrote, "With a little oomph, a whole lotta shimmy-shimmy-ya and a few hip swivels, Bruno's ska-bop jam was given new life. It all seems so effortless; so cool and fresh; pop performances don't often fall ahead of the curve, but this one does." Sam Lansky of Idolator praised the performance, writing that "Mars turned it out on the show, with an energetic rendition of 'Locked Out of Heaven' backed by a fleet of impeccably choreographed dancers." A live performance was also done on the ninth UK series of The X Factor on November 25, 2012. On December 4, Mars performed on the Victoria's Secret Fashion Show, aired on CBS. His performance happened during the Calendar Girls segment. Mars performed the song at the Jingle Bell Ball at London's The O2 Arena on December 8. On December 13, he performed "Locked Out of Heaven" on the second US season of The X Factor.

Mars also performed the song with Sting at the 2013 Grammy Awards, and was later joined by Rihanna, Ziggy Marley and Damian Marley to pay tribute to reggae legend Bob Marley. It was played as the twelfth or fifteenth track on the set list of his second tour, The Moonshine Jungle Tour (2013–14), and as an encore on his debut concert residency, Bruno Mars at The Chelsea, Las Vegas (2013–15). On February 2, 2014, the single was featured as the third number in the mini-set medley, in the halftime performance of Super Bowl XLVIII at MetLife Stadium in New Jersey. During The Late Late Show with James Corden on December 13, 2016, Mars included "Locked Out of Heaven" on the popular segment Carpool Karaoke. On his third tour, the 24K Magic World Tour (2017–18), "Locked Out of Heaven" was the fourteenth or fifteenth track of the setlist, in the latter case sang as an encore. The track was part of the Bruno Mars Live (2022–2024) setlist.

== Cover versions and usage in other media ==
British quartet Bastille covered "Locked Out of Heaven" for BBC Radio 1 DJ Sara Cox in the Live Lounge on January 21, 2013. The band's version saw a mash-up between the track and Rihanna's "Diamonds"; also incorporating "Niggas in Paris" by Jay-Z and Kanye West and "Angels" by The xx. The female members of the New Directions glee club covered the song in the "Sadie Hawkins" episode of Glee. English singer Leona Lewis included an acoustic version of "Locked Out of Heaven" on the set-list for her 2013 concert tour, Glassheart Tour. American singer Bridgit Mendler covered an acoustic version of the song for her online series called The Hurricane Sessions and the official video of her cover was uploaded on YouTube on May 15, 2013. The video received nearly 500,000 views in its first week, landing herself in the 46th position of Billboard Social 50 Artists. English singer Amelia Lily performed the song in her set on the Girls Aloud Ten: The Hits Tour in 2013 and during her summer gigs. The duo Major Lazer produced a remix of the song that was include on the Target Edition and later on the deluxe edition of Unorthodox Jukebox. The song also appeared on multiple Nissan Car commercials that debuted in April 2013. "Locked Out of Heaven" was also used on commercials for Toyota and Samsung.

== Formats and track listing ==
- Digital download
1. "Locked Out of Heaven" – 3:53
- CD single
1. "Locked Out of Heaven" (Album Version) – 3:53
2. Extras: Bruno Mars Poster / Stickers
- Digital download – Remixes
1. "Locked Out of Heaven" (Cazzette's Answering Machine Mix) – 6:41
2. "Locked Out of Heaven" (Sultan + Ned Shepherd Remix) – 6:50
3. "Locked Out of Heaven" (The M Machine Remix) – 4:02
4. "Locked Out of Heaven" (Paul Oakenfold Remix) – 5:17

== Personnel ==
Credits adapted from the liner notes of Unorthodox Jukebox.

- Bruno Mars – lead vocals, songwriting, guitar
- Philip Lawrence – songwriting
- Ari Levine – songwriting, recording
- The Smeezingtons – production
- Mark Ronson –production, performer as DJ Shit, recording
- Jeff Bhasker – production, keyboards
- Emile Haynie – production, additional drums, keys, FX
- Nick Movshon – bass
- Homer Steinweiss – drums
- Artie Smith – gear and vibraphone
- ALALAL – recording
- Wayne Gordon – recording
- Bob Mallory – recording assistant
- Tyler Hartman – recording assistant
- Charles Moniz – additional engineer
- Manny Marroquin – mixing
- David Kutch – mastering

== Charts ==
=== Weekly charts ===
List of chart positions
Chart (2012–2013)	Peak position
Australia (ARIA)	4
Austria (Ö3 Austria Top 40)	5
Belgium (Ultratop 50 Flanders)	4
Belgium (Ultratop 50 Wallonia)	3
Canada Hot 100 (Billboard)	1
Canada AC (Billboard)	1
Canada CHR/Top 40 (Billboard)	1
Canada Hot AC (Billboard)	1
Colombia Airplay (National-Report)	16
CIS Airplay (TopHit)	31
Czech Republic Airplay (ČNS IFPI)	5
Czech Republic Singles Digital (ČNS IFPI)	71
Denmark (Tracklisten)	2
Finland (Suomen virallinen lista)	11
France (SNEP)	3
Germany (GfK)	7
Hungary (Rádiós Top 40)	1
Hungary (Single Top 40)	8
Iceland (RÚV)	10
Ireland (IRMA)	4
Israel International Airplay (Media Forest)	2
Italy (FIMI)	3
Japan Hot 100 (Billboard)	9
Lebanon (Lebanese Top 20)	1
Luxembourg Digital Song Sales (Billboard)	6
Mexico (Billboard Mexican Airplay)	1
Mexico Anglo (Monitor Latino)	1
Netherlands (Dutch Top 40)	5
Netherlands (Single Top 100)	10
New Zealand (Recorded Music NZ)	4
Norway (VG-lista)	7
Poland Airplay (ZPAV)	1
Romania (Airplay 100)	42
Russia Airplay (TopHit)	28
Scottish Singles Sales (Official Charts)	2
Slovakia Airplay (ČNS IFPI)	1
South Korea International (Gaon Chart)	3
Spain (Promusicae)	3
Sweden (Sverigetopplistan)	6
Switzerland (Schweizer Hitparade)	8
Ukraine Airplay (TopHit)	49
UK Singles (Official Charts)	2
US Billboard Hot 100	1
US Adult Contemporary (Billboard)	7
US Adult Pop Airplay (Billboard)	2
US Dance Club Songs (Billboard)	19
US Dance Airplay (Billboard)	8
US Latin Airplay (Billboard)	21
US Pop Airplay (Billboard)	1
US Rhythmic Airplay (Billboard)	1
Venezuela Airplay (Record Report)	63

List of chart positions
Chart (2023–2026)	Peak position
Brazil Hot 100 (Billboard)	44
Global 200 (Billboard)	23
Greece International (IFPI)	71
Lithuania Airplay (TopHit)	89
Netherlands (Single Top 100)	16
Netherlands (Global Top 40)	28
Netherlands (Streaming Top 40)	19
Panama Streaming (PRODUCE)	150
Philippines (Philippines Hot 100)	45
Portugal (AFP)	66
Singapore (RIAS)	6

=== Year-end charts ===
List of chart positions
Chart (2012)	Position
Australia (ARIA)	28
Belgium (Ultratop 50 Flanders)	94
Belgium (Ultratop 50 Wallonia)	73
Brazil (Crowley)	62
France (SNEP)	62
Germany (Media Control AG)	64
Hungary (Rádiós Top 40)	49
Italy (FIMI)	48
Netherlands (Dutch Top 40)	62
Netherlands (Single Top 100)	67
New Zealand (Recorded Music NZ)	48
UK Singles (OCC)	33

List of chart positions
Chart (2013)	Position
Australia (ARIA)	60
Belgium (Ultratop 50 Flanders)	22
Belgium (Ultratop 50 Wallonia)	11
Brazil (Crowley)	32
Canada (Canadian Hot 100)	11
France (SNEP)	7
Germany (Media Control AG)	90
Hungary (Rádiós Top 40)	10
Israel (Media Forest)	37
Italy (FIMI)	32
Japan (Japan Hot 100)	31
Netherlands (Dutch Top 40)	45
Netherlands (Single Top 100)	66
New Zealand (Recorded Music NZ)	47
Russia Airplay (TopHit)	153
Spain (PROMUSICAE)	14
Sweden (Sverigetopplistan)	28
Switzerland (Schweizer Hitparade)	47
Ukraine Airplay (TopHit)	111
UK Singles (OCC)	47
US Billboard Hot 100	11
US Dance/Mix Show Airplay (Billboard)	31
US Adult Contemporary (Billboard)	20
US Adult Top 40 (Billboard)	12
US Mainstream Top 40 (Billboard)	2
US Rhythmic (Billboard)	14

List of chart positions
Chart (2014)	Position
France (SNEP)	130
Japan Adult Contemporary (Billboard)	99

List of chart position
Chart (2015)	Position
France (SNEP)	198

List of chart position
Chart (2022)	Position
Hungary (Rádiós Top 40)	82

List of chart position
Chart (2023)	Position
Hungary (Rádiós Top 40)	66

List of chart positions
Chart (2024)	Position
Global 200 (Billboard)	120
Portugal (AFP)	183

List of chart position
Chart (2025)	Position
Global 200 (Billboard)	104

=== Decade-end charts ===
List of chart positions
Chart (2010–2019)	Position
Australia (ARIA)	93
US Billboard Hot 100	45

== Certifications ==
List of certifications
Region	Certification	Certified units/sales
Australia (ARIA)	7× Platinum	490,000^{‡}
Austria (IFPI Austria)	Gold	15,000^{*}
Belgium (BRMA)	Platinum	30,000^{*}
Canada (Music Canada)	Diamond	800,000^{‡}
Denmark (IFPI Danmark)	3× Platinum	270,000^{‡}
France (SNEP)	Platinum	150,000^{*}
Germany (BVMI)	2× Platinum	600,000^{‡}
Italy (FIMI)	3× Platinum	90,000^{‡}
Japan (RIAJ)	Gold	100,000^{*}
Mexico (AMPROFON)	3× Platinum+Gold	210,000^{*}
New Zealand (RMNZ)	8× Platinum	240,000^{‡}
Portugal (AFP)	5× Platinum	50,000^{‡}
Spain (Promusicae)	3× Platinum	180,000^{‡}
Sweden (GLF)	3× Platinum	120,000^{‡}
Switzerland (IFPI Switzerland)	Platinum	30,000^{^}
United Kingdom (BPI)	4× Platinum	2,400,000^{‡}
United States (RIAA)	Diamond	10,000,000^{‡}
Streaming
Denmark (IFPI Danmark)	2× Platinum	3,600,000^{†}
Greece (IFPI Greece)	2× Platinum	4,000,000^{†}
Spain (Promusicae)	2× Platinum	16,000,000^{†}
^{*} Sales figures based on certification alone.^{^} Shipments figures based on certification alone.^{‡} Sales+streaming figures based on certification alone.^{†} Streaming-only figures based on certification alone.

== Release history ==
List of release history, showing region(s), date(s), format(s) and label(s)
Region	Date	Format	Label	Ref.
United States	October 1, 2012	Digital download	Atlantic	
United States	October 1, 2012	Radio airplay	Atlantic	
United States	October 2, 2012	Contemporary hit radio	Atlantic	
Italy	October 2, 2012	Radio airplay	Warner Music Group	
United States	October 25, 2012	Rhythmic contemporary	Atlantic	
Germany	October 3, 2012	Digital download	Atlantic; WMG	
Germany	November 2, 2012	CD single	Atlantic; WMG	
Austria	November 2, 2012	CD single	Atlantic; WMG	
Switzerland	November 2, 2012	CD single	Atlantic; WMG	
Poland	November 5, 2012	CD single	Warner Music Poland	
Japan	November 21, 2012	CD single	Atlantic; WMG	
United Kingdom	November 26, 2012	Digital download	Unknown	
United Kingdom	January 21, 2013	Digital download	Atlantic	

== See also ==
- List of best-selling singles in Australia
- List of best-selling singles in the United States
- List of Billboard Hot 100 number-one singles of 2012
- List of Billboard Hot 100 number-one singles of 2013
- List of Billboard Rhythmic number-one songs of the 2010s
- List of Hot 100 number-one singles of 2012 (Canada)
- List of Hot 100 number-one singles of 2013 (Canada)
- List of Mainstream Top 40 number-one hits of 2012 (U.S.)
- List of Mainstream Top 40 number-one hits of 2013 (U.S.)
- List of number-one singles of 2010 (Hungary)
- List of number-one singles of 2013 (Poland)
