= Super Bowl XLVIII halftime show =

2014 show headlined by Bruno Mars

- Part of: Super Bowl XLVIII
- Date: February 2, 2014
- Location: East Rutherford, New Jersey
- Venue: MetLife Stadium
- Headliner: Bruno Mars
- Special guests: Red Hot Chili Peppers
- Sponsor: Pepsi
- Director: Hamish Hamilton
- Producer: Ricky Kirshner

Super Bowl halftime show chronology
XLVII (2013)	XLVIII (2014)	XLIX (2015)

The Super Bowl XLVIII halftime show occurred on February 2, 2014, at MetLife Stadium in New Jersey as part of Super Bowl XLVIII and was headlined by Bruno Mars alongside his band The Hooligans, with special guests The Red Hot Chili Peppers. The Fox telecast of the halftime show attracted the largest audience in the history of the Super Bowl, attracting 115.3 million viewers, later surpassed by the Super Bowl XLIX, Super Bowl 50, and Super Bowl LI halftime shows.

The show was produced by Ricky Kirshner and directed by Hamish Hamilton, receiving two 2014 Primetime Emmy Award nominations for Outstanding Short-Format Live-Action Entertainment Program and Outstanding Lighting Design / Lighting Direction for a Variety Special. The performance generated 2.2 million tweets, due to interest for tickets to Mars' Moonshine Jungle Tour.

== Background ==
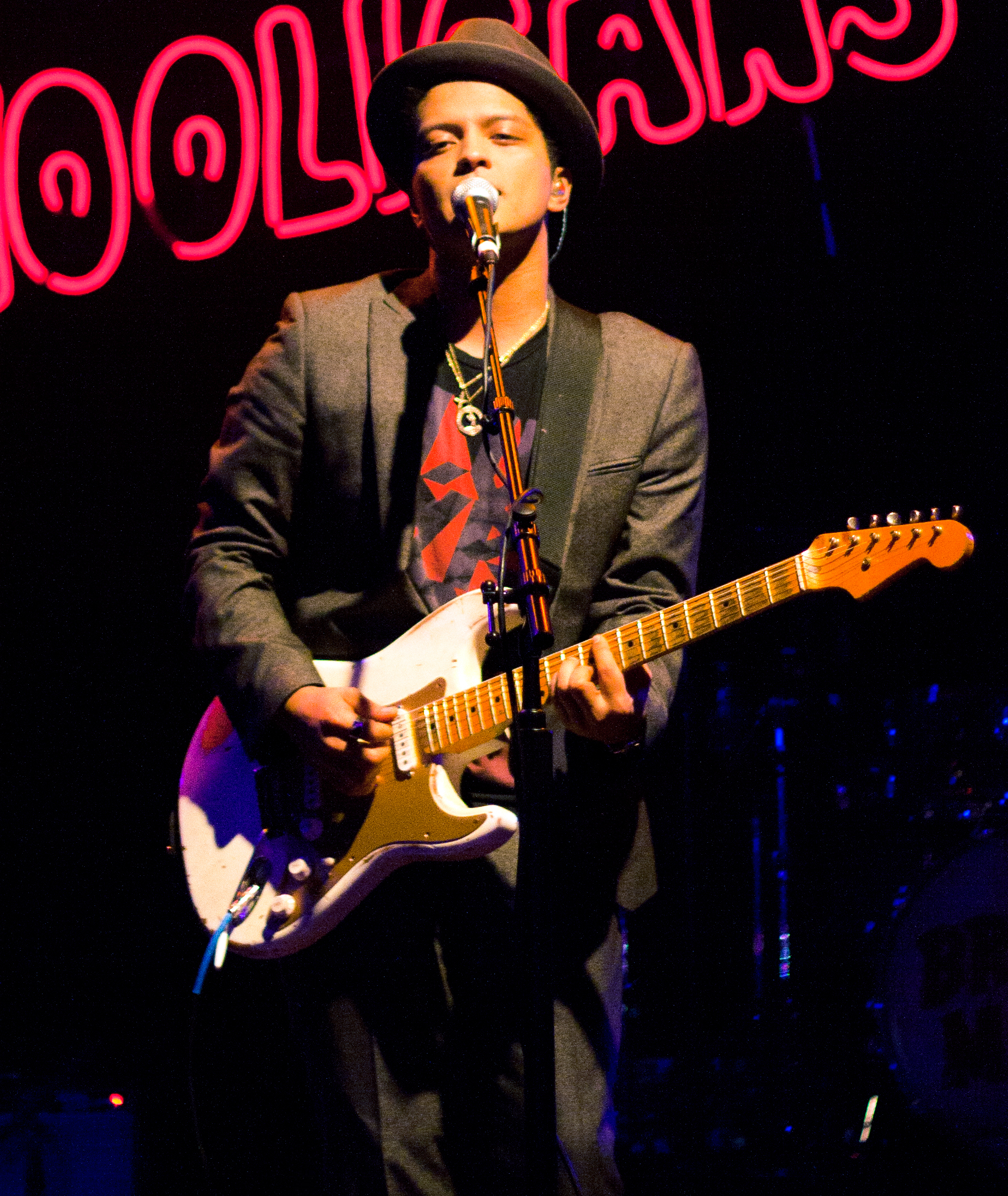
Bruno Mars performing in 2010

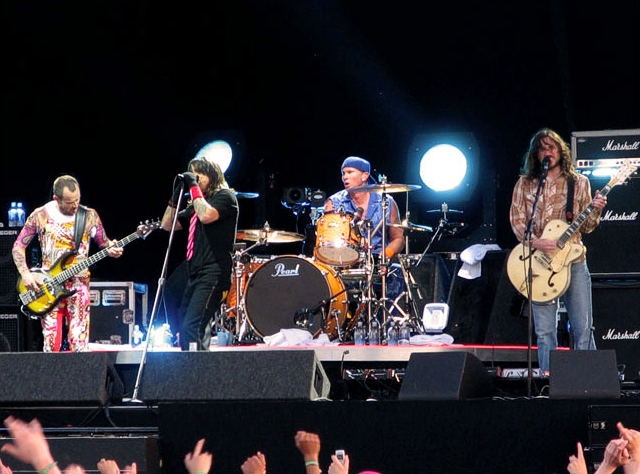
Red Hot Chili Peppers in 2006

Bruno Mars was confirmed as the lead half time performer for Super Bowl XLVIII in September 2013 during a Fox NFL Sunday broadcast held live in Times Square in New York City. The NFL's entertainment team started working with Mars and his management on the halftime set list around Thanksgiving week and spent the remainder of 2013 mapping out the production and staging, along with the guest list. In January 2014 it was announced that Mars had personally invited Red Hot Chili Peppers to perform as special guests during his performance. On January 24, 2014, during the game's fourth quarter, Hyundai debuted the spot entitled "Dad's Sixth Sense", that featured the 2016 Hyundai Genesis and Mars' single "Count on Me". The song was chosen "for reasons separate and coincidental from Mars' previously announced Half Time gig".

During rehearsals there were some disagreements between Mars and the NFL, regarding the singer's performance. The latter wanted to show the audience wearing light-up bracelets to which Mars concurred "If you take that camera off me, you're doing yourself a disservice. And what happened? They spent all this money on these things, and it didn't work." Fortunately, Mars and his band rehearsed a lot and it didn't matter if they had "cafeteria lighting" or a budget of $5 million (U.S.), the performance would always be the best they could do. According to the singer, "Every smoke machine and laser light is just a bonus."

== Development ==
The halftime show was produced by Ricky Kirshner and directed by Hamish Hamilton. Mars and his eight-piece band, The Hooligans, were dressed in clothes custom created by Saint Laurent by Hedi Slimane. Prince, Michael Jackson and James Brown used the same style in clothes; Mars worked a retro gold lame jacket paired with a white shirt, black trousers and a matching skinny tie. Mars made history at the Super Bowl XLVIII Halftime Show as the youngest artist ever to serve as the sole NFL Super Bowl Halftime headliner. He opened the show with a drum solo on a kit designed to honor his late mother, Bernadette Hernandez. The artwork was modeled after Mars' arm tattoo dedicated to his mother. During his performance of "Just the Way You Are" he was standing midfield, backed by the biggest firework display in NFL Super Bowl history.

Montreal, Canada-based firm PixMob provided audience lighting effects during the show: "video ski hats" with LEDs and an infrared receiver were distributed to attendees of the game. Lighting cues were sent to the hats using infrared signals from around the stadium, transforming the audience into "pixels" of a giant "screen". Starting with this halftime show, the halftime show logo does not appear in the introduction. As well, the opening was changed to "The National Football League welcomes you to the (sponsor) Super Bowl (Numeral) Halftime Show".

== Setlist ==
1. "Billionaire" (Intro) (Children's choir)
2. Drum solo (Bruno Mars)
3. "Locked Out of Heaven"
4. "Treasure"
5. "Runaway Baby"
6. "Give It Away" (featuring Red Hot Chili Peppers)
7. "Just the Way You Are" (Tribute to the United States Armed Forces)

Set list adapted from Billboard.

== Reception ==
=== Critical ===
Mars' performance received highly positive reviews from critics, while the Red Hot Chili Peppers' appearance received mixed to negative reviews. Mike Bruno of Entertainment Weekly gave a positive review of the halftime performance, complimenting Mars' "impressive" vocal performance and stating that "there's no question the kid is talented". Entertainment Weekly also criticized the Red Hot Chili Peppers' involvement in the performance, stating that there was "nothing wrong" with their performance however that their presence was "random and unnecessary". Matthew Perpetua of BuzzFeed called Mars a "world class entertainer" and stated that Mars' performance was "dazzling" and "pretty awesome". However, Perpetua also stated that the Chili Peppers' presence was "unnecessary" and also noted that the halftime show was not as memorable as the previous year's show, which was performed by Beyoncé. Lindsey Weber of Vulture stated it was unfair to compare Mars' performance to Beyoncé's and that the performance was "perfectly Bruno"; however, Weber also said that it was unlikely that people would "still be talking about" the performance the day after. Mikael Wood of Los Angeles Times stated that Mars "delivered" during the performance and showed viewers that he is a "real musician" however felt that the performance did not begin to feel "hopelessly retro" compared to Beyoncé's performance until the Chili Peppers joined Mars. Wood felt that the Chili Peppers' performance was "stale" and unwanted and stated that Mars did not need any guests to make the performance special.

Chris Chase and Chris Strauss of USA Today gave a mixed review of the show, saying it was "unspectacular" and "instantly forgettable" and felt that Mars' youth and unlengthy repertoire failed to give him the legacy of previous halftime performers. Chase and Strauss stated the performance was "acceptable" however that it would not be remembered.

=== Red Hot Chili Peppers controversy ===
Some complaints, including some from fellow musicians, were directed towards Red Hot Chili Peppers bassist Flea and guitarist Josh Klinghoffer who appeared to not have wires connected to their instruments and were accused of faking their performance. A few days following the Super Bowl, Flea responded through the band's website by saying:

"When we were asked by the NFL and Bruno to play our song "Give It Away" at the Super Bowl, it was made clear to us that the vocals would be live, but the bass, drums, and guitar would be pre-recorded. I understand the NFL's stance on this, given they only have a few minutes to set up the stage, there a zillion things that could go wrong and ruin the sound for the folks watching in the stadium and the TV viewers. There was not any room for argument on this, the NFL does not want to risk their show being botched by bad sound, period. For the actual performance, Josh, Chad, and I were playing along with the pre recorded track (which was recorded earlier that week) so there was no need to plug in our guitars, so we did not. Could we have plugged them in and avoided bumming people out who have expressed disappointment that the instrument track was pre recorded? Of course easily we could have and this would be a non-issue. We thought it better to not pretend. It seemed like the realest thing to do in the circumstance. We decided that, with Anthony singing live, that we could still bring the spirit and freedom of what we do into the performance, and of course we played every note in the recording specially for the gig."

Chili Peppers drummer Chad Smith also responded to the controversy through his Twitter page saying: "FYI.... Every band in the last 10 years at the Super Bowl has performed to a previously recorded track. It's the NFL's policy. Period."

Some fans also complained to the U.S. Federal Communications Commission (FCC) about the band's shirtless appearance, saying that they were offended and both men and women should wear clothing because children were watching. One person contacted the FCC complaining how it was unfair for the Chili Peppers to be able to go topless but that Janet Jackson's exposed nipple caused so much backlash.

=== Ratings ===
The Super Bowl XLVIII halftime show was once the most watched in the history of the Super Bowl drawing record ratings of 115.3 million viewers, passing the record 114 million who watched Madonna perform two years earlier. This was surpassed by Katy Perry in 2015, Coldplay in 2016, and Lady Gaga in 2017. However, that number was significantly higher than the 98.88 million viewers reported in the overnight ratings from Nielsen that measure the top 56 markets.

=== Media ===
On February 3, 2014 Billboard predicted that retailers had sold Unorthodox Jukebox 40,000 copies in the week ending February 2, representing a 164% gain compared to the previous week, when it sold 15,000, according to Nielsen SoundScan. Despite this effect, the album was already aiming for around 19,000 copies sold in the week ending February 2, thanks in part to Mars' exposure at the 2014 Grammy Awards. Mars was presented the award for Best Pop Vocal Album on the Grammys and got additional screen time from his nominations in other categories as Record of the Year and Song of the Year. The author of the article added that "the impact of the Super Bowl on Mars' music sales, and on the Billboard charts, will be unique compared to all other halftime headliners in the modern era of Super Bowl halftime entertainment". On the following week it was expect that Unorthodox Jukebox would sell 70,000 to 80,000 copies by the end of the tracking week, coming for the top three on next week's Billboard 200 chart, while his debut album, Doo-Wops & Hooligans, was expected sell around 25,000 copies.

Regarding the tickets sales of his worldwide tour, The Moonshine Jungle Tour, Mars became the fastest entertainer to sell out three concerts at the Blaisdell Arena, in Hawaii. Since the morning of February 3, 2014, the average price for The Moonshine Jungle Tour went up $150 to an average price of $500. Despite existence of some tickets left on the primary market for select shows, many were sold out. Ticketmaster also struggled to keep with demand, having to switch from their interactive seating maps for most events. The price for tickets on the primary market ranges from $49–$100 for most shows. Bigger city shows prices range from $70 to $181. For shows at big venues, the average prices on the secondary market is north of $600 with the cheapest tickets going for $150. At these prices, Mars upcoming tour ranks amongst the most expensive in the country this summer, ahead of One Direction tickets and Jason Aldean tickets, which were two of the highest prices for an American tour during the spring and summer of 2014.

== See also ==
- 2014 in American music
- 2014 in American television
- List of Super Bowl halftime shows
