= Manda Malina =

Swedish singer and songwriter (born 1994)

- Born: Manda Malina Nilsénius; 1994 (age 31–32)
- Origin: Sweden
- Genre: Pop
- Occupations: Singer; songwriter
- Years active: 2012–present
- Labels: Almost Royal; Manda

Manda Malina Nilsénius (born 1994), known professionally as Manda Malina, is a Swedish singer and songwriter. She competed on the Swedish X Factor and the Melodifestivalen competition for Eurovision.

== Personal life ==
Malina was born and raised in Sweden. She is openly queer.

== Career ==
In February 2014, Malina performed on the Melodifestivalen 2014 competition for the Eurovision Song Contest. After her performance, she placed 8th in Heat 2. She told Metroscene Magazine that she got signed and moved to LA shortly after Melodifestivalen, but then got dropped.

In June 2022, she performed at the Gritty In Pink Pride Jam, as well as Sacramento Pride. In October 2023, she released her debut album, "Ladylove". In 2024, Malina collaborated with Sophia Dashing on the single "Raindrops (On Your Pillow)," a track noted for its fusion of Y2K pop and contemporary R&B influences. In March 2025, she released "Supermodel", produced by Lostboy.

== X Factor ==
Malina first appeared in the 2012 Swedish X Factor in the show's inaugural and only season. She finished 7th overall between 12 final contestants.

The X Factor Sweden performances and results (2012)
Episode	Song	Result
Live show 1: Top 12	"We Found Love"	Safe
Live show 2: Top 11	"One Last Time"	Safe
Live show 3: Top 10	"It Feels So Good"	Bottom two
Live show 3: Top 10	"Wide Awake"	Saved
Live show 4: Top 9	"Bad Romance"	Safe
Live show 4: Top 9	"No One"	Eliminated (Brought back after recount)
Live show 5: Top 8	"If I Were a Boy"	Safe
Live show 6: Top 7	"Listen to Your Heart"	Bottom two
Live show 6: Top 7	Oops!... I Did It Again	Eliminated

== Discography ==
All credits adapted from Apple Music and Spotify.

=== Singles ===
==== As lead artist ====
Year	Title	Album	Writer(s)	Producer(s)
2025	"Better Than Any Gift" (with Mariah Counts)	Christmas Time To Me	Manda Malina, Mariah Counts, Ryan Benyo	Ryan Benyo
2025	"Keepin it Pretty" (with Mila Jam and Ilana Glazer)	Non-album singles	Mila Jam, Nicolas Larsson Billett	1and2 Productions
2025	“Found It”	Non-album singles	Drew Louis, Jayelle Gerber	Drew Louis
2025	"Think Of U"	Non-album singles	Manda Malina, Mae Agloro	Kevin Qian
2025	"Supermodel"	Non-album singles	Manda Malina, Deanna Villarreal, Dillon Deskin	Dillon Deskin
2024	"All I Want for Christmas Is You"	Non-album singles	Mariah Carey, Walter Afanasieff	Anthony Alexander
2024	"Raindrops (On Your Pillow)" (with Sophia Dashing)	Non-album singles	Manda Malina, Sophia Dashing, Jason Quinones	Jason Quinones
2024	"Paperheart"	Non-album singles	Manda Malina, Ash Taylor	No producers credited
2024	"Girls On Girls" (with Lordnox and Anna Sinatra)	Non-album singles	Manda Malina, Pasquale Calabria, Donato Giovinazzo, Anna Abbott	No producers credited
2024	"I Love Rock 'N Roll" (with Aeral and Coffeeshop)	Non-album singles	Alex Merrill, Jane Hooker	Aeral, Coffeeshop
2024	"Bad Girl" (with Russen)	Non-album singles	Manda Malina, Iljas Linnbark, Max Bergå	No producers credited
2024	"Trouble" (with Dxt3r and The Crushboys)	Non-album singles	Kornel Brad	No producers credited
2023	"Last Friday Night" (with Gulmee and Nick Giardino)	Non-album singles	Bonnie McKee, Katy Perry, Max Martin, Łukasz Gottwald	Manda Malina, Gulmee, Nick Giardino
2023	"It's You" (with Brilllion and Jade Key)	Non-album singles	Manda Malina, JunMo Sung, Joseph Ryu	
2023	"When Love Takes Over" (with Thatsimo and Janfry)	Non-album singles	David Guetta, Frederic Jean Riesterer, Kelly Rowland, Miriam Nervo, Olivia Nervo	Thatsimo, Janfry, Giacomo Alloescio
2023	"Meow"	Ladylove	Manda Malina, Deanna Villarreal, Sad Alex	Sad Alex
2023	"Shirtless"	Ladylove	Manda Malina, Christine Joy Firmeza Saquing	CeeJ
2023	"Heaven on Earth"	Ladylove	Manda Malina, Nicolas Larsson	F4kuPaym3
2023	"Girl in The Mirror"	Non-album singles	Manda Malina, Jayce Cantor	Jayce Cantor
2023	"Crybaby"	Non-album singles	Manda Malina, Anthony Jardine, Em Andre	Anthony Jardine
2023	"Love Myself"	Non-album singles	Manda Malina, Deanna Michelle Villarreal, Jason Boulé, Ron Geffen	Ron Geffen
2023	"Stereotype"	Non-album singles	Manda Malina	Ron Geffen
2023	"Slowly"	Non-album singles	Manda Malina, Jason Boulé, Ron Geffen	Ron Geffen
2022	"Bow On Top" (with Ron Geffen)	Non-album singles	Manda Malina, Ron Geffen	Ron Geffen
2022	"Her Ocean"	Non-album singles	Manda Malina	Ron Geffen, Anthony Jardine
2022	"Fuck Myself"	Ladylove	Manda Malina, Deanna Michelle Villarreal, Jason Boulé	Ron Geffen
2020	"Loved by You (Crystal Rock Remix)" (with Lordnox and Crystal Rock)	Non-album singles	Manda Malina, Pasquale Lordnox	Pasquale Lordnox
2020	"Card House" (with Lordnox)	Non-album singles	Manda Malina, Pasquale Calabria	Pasquale Calabria
2019	"Crocodile Tears"	Non-album singles	Manda Malina, Hampus Bäckström, Izak Mannberg, M Basa, Mattias Westergren	HimxHer

==== As featured artist ====
Title	Year	Album
"Everybody Get Gronk'ed" (Jack D. Elliott featuring Manda Malina and Gsnaps)	2022	No producers credited
"I Don't Need Your Love" (Rush Sounds featuring Gonzelli and Manda Malina)	2018	No producers credited

=== Studio albums ===
Title	Details
Ladylove	Released: October 6, 2023; Label: Almost Royal; Format: Digital download, streaming; Track listing: 1. "Freedom (Interlude)"; 2. "Fuck Myself"; 3. "Meow"; 4. "Shirtless"; 5. "Chatroulette"; 6. "Her Ocean"; 7. "Heaven on Earth"; 8. "Pillowtalk"
