= Gritty In Pink =

Women's music organization

Gritty in Pink
- Formation: 2020; 6 years ago
- Founder: Shira Yevin
- Website: www.grittyinpink.co

Gritty in Pink is an organization that provides gigs, information, and community for women within the music industry. Founded in 2020 by Shira Yevin of Shiragirl, Gritty in Pink produces and hosts jams, workshops, and panels, and created the Inpink Marketplace.

== History ==
The organization was founded in January 2020 by Shira Yevin of Shiragirl, providing performance opportunities to women in music via the monthly All Grl Jam in Los Angeles, California. In July 2021, they started a live-stream virtual tour to showcase female musicians around the United States during the COVID-19 pandemic. In June 2022, they had a Pride edition of the All Grl Jam featuring Shiragirl, Jayelle, and Manda Malina. In May 2024, Ariel Bellvalaire was featured on the cover of Gritty Magazine.

== Inpink ==
Inpink is Gritty in Pink's online platform designed to connect women in the music industry with jobs in music. In March 2022, Melissa Ethridge was announced as the first strategic advisor for the platform, followed by Live Nation in October 2022, and Arlan Hamilton in March 2024. Ethridge hired a videographer via the platform to shoot shows in April 2024.
