= Sophia Dashing =

American singer-songwriter and dancer

- Born: Atlanta, Georgia, United States
- Occupation: Singer-songwriter · dancer
- Years active: 2021–present
- Website: www.sophiadashing.com

Sophia Dashing is an American pop singer-songwriter and dancer from Atlanta, Georgia known for her advocacy for the feminist movement and the LGBTQ community.

== Career ==
In 2021, Dashing released her debut single "High Priestess," which she described as a self-discovery, self-love song anthem. Following her debut release, she released more singles, including "Way I", which accumulated over 220,000 streams and was described as a "made to set the mood for couples to express their love for each other", and "Still In Love," which was described as a soulful ballad by The Garnette Report.

In 2022, she was nominated as the Best Singer-Songwriter by Jezebel Magazine and won. In the same year, she also performed at the Atlanta Pride Festival, which she appeared alongside artists such as Flo Rida, Betty Who, Big Freedia, jax, Brooke Eden, Neriah and Chrissy Chlapecka. She performed at the Festival on Saturday October 8 "Opening Day" at 4 pm. She was also supposed to perform in the Atlanta Pride Festival in 2021, but didn't, for unknown reasons.

In 2024 Dashing collaborated with Swedish pop artist and X Factor competitor Manda Malina, on the single "Raindrops On Your Pillow"

== Personal life ==
Sophia Dashing was born and raised in Atlanta, Georgia. She got introduced in the artistic world through dancing as a 6-year-old child.

Dashing is an advocate and member of the LGBTQ community. In an interview with ZO magazine, she expressed a sense of responsibility to advocate for herself and others, using her position to push for positive change. In an interview with Naluda Magazine, she also explained how important it is for her to advocate for the feminist movement, as it is a core part of her identity as an artist.

== Discography ==
All credits adapted from Apple Music and Spotify.

=== Singles ===
==== As lead artist ====
Year	Title	Album	Writer(s)	Producer(s)
2025	"Phenomenon"	Non-album singles	Sophia Dashing, Alto Moon, Gareth Calk, William Lovely	Sophia Dashing, Gareth, Alto Moon, PhD-Lovely
2024	"Raindrops (On Your Pillow)" (with Manda Malina)	Non-album singles	Sophia Dashing, Manda Malina, Jason Quinones	Jason Quinones
2024	"Does Love Have to Be This Way"	Non-album singles	Sophia Dashing	Bobsled
2023	"One of One"	Non-album singles	Sophia Dashing	Sophia Dashing, Bobsled
2023	"Still in Love"	Non-album singles	Sophia Dashing, Shayna Higgenbottom	Shayna Higgenbottom, Isaiah Hill
2022	"Lonely"	Non-album singles	Sophia Dashing, Janet R. Smith, Jesse Owen Austin	No producer credited
2021	"Way I"	Non-album singles	Sophia Dashing	Xavier Hayes (Eks)
2021	"Divine"	Non-album singles	Sophia Dashing	No producers credited
2021	"Bad Boy"	Non-album singles	Sophia Dashing	No producers credited
2021	"High Priestess"	Non-album singles	Sophia Dashing	No producers credited

== Awards and nominations ==
Award	Year	category	Recipient(s) and Nominee(s)	Result	Ref,
Jezebel Magazine	2022	Best Singer-Songwriter	Herself	Won	
