= Isak Danielson =

Swedish singer and songwriter

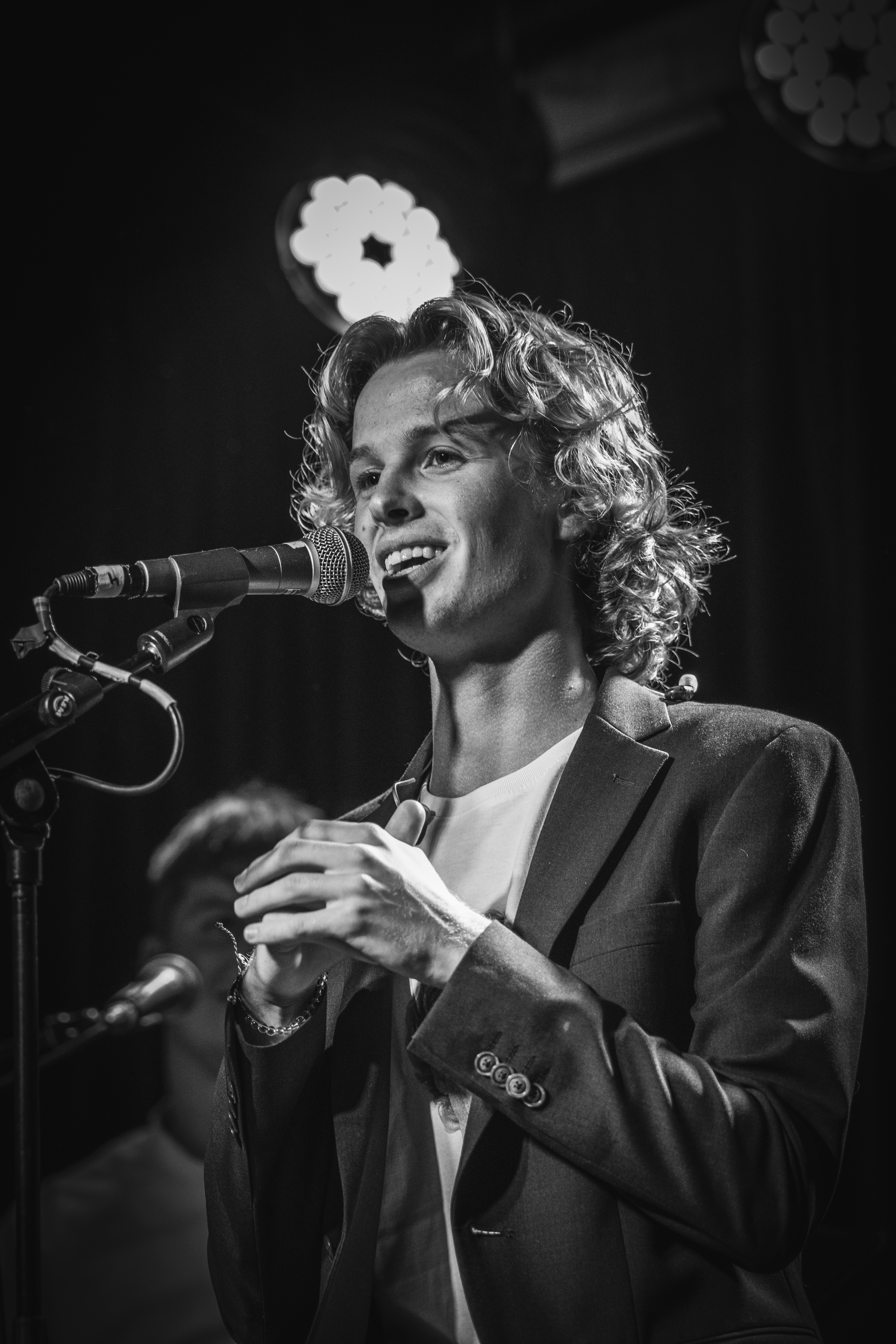
- Isak Danielson in Gothenburg - August 2018
- Born: Isak Ocke Danielson; 27 August 1997 (age 29); Gothenburg, Sweden
- Occupations: Singer; songwriter
- Years active: 2012–present
- Website: isakdanielson.com

Isak Ocke Danielson (born 27 August 1997) is a Swedish singer and songwriter. He is best known for his song "Always" and his albums Yours (2018) and Remember to Remember Me (2020).

== Early life ==
Danielson was born on 27 August 1997 and has two older sisters. The family grew up in Hovås, south of Gothenburg. His father, Måns Danielson, is one of the founders of the online food company Mat. The family lived in London from 2008 to 2010, where Danielson attended Tring Park School for the Performing Arts and was trained in theatre and singing. Danielson said of this time "I learned to sing classically and use the diaphragm. My voice evolved and I got better at singing."

== Career ==
=== 2012: The X Factor ===
Danielson's breakthrough came in 2012, where he successfully auditioned for The X Factor Sweden, where he eventually placed third.

The X Factor Sweden performances and results (2012)
Episode	Song	Result
Live show 1: Top 12	"Somebody That I Used to Know"	Safe
Live show 2: Top 11	"Keep On Walking"	Safe
Live show 3: Top 10	"You're Beautiful"	Safe
Live show 4: Top 9	"Skyfall"	Safe
Live show 5: Top 8	"Dancing On My Own"/"Från och med Du"	Safe
Live show 6: Top 7	"Silhouettes"	Safe
Live show 7: Top 6	"Feeling Good"	Bottom two
Live show 7: Top 6	"I Was Here"	Saved
Live show 8: Top 5	"Ordinary People"	Safe
Live show 8: Top 5	"9 to 5"	Safe
Live show 9: Top 4 (Semi-Final)	"Skyfall"	Bottom two
Live show 9: Top 4 (Semi-Final)	"Viva la Vida"	Bottom two
Live show 9: Top 4 (Semi-Final)	"Read All About It, Pt. III"	Saved
Live show 10: Top 3 (Final)	"Titanium"	Eliminated in 3rd position
Live show 10: Top 3 (Final)	"Life Is a Rollercoaster" (with Ronan Keating)	Eliminated in 3rd position

=== 2013–2017: Career beginnings and EPs ===
In December 2013, Danielson uploaded his debut single "Long Live This Love" onto YouTube, before its official release in January 2014 by TEN Music Group.

In January 2015, Danielson released "Falling Into You", the lead single from his debut EP Volume One which was released in March 2015. A Scandipop review called the EP "A six track collection that is seemingly tailored specifically to showcase what we believe to be one of the best male voices in Scandinavian pop music. It's a mixture of soulful ballads, with a couple of acoustic folk pop romps thrown in for good measure."

In October 2016, Danielson released his second EP, titled Volume Two, which was preceded by the single "Remember" in September.

In April 2017, Danielson's track "Ending" was featured in a choreography video posted by Maddie Ziegler and in September 2017 the song was also featured on American program So You Think You Can Dance and again in the American television series Cloak & Dagger. These events saw an increase in his streaming numbers around the world.

=== 2018–2020: Yours and Remember to Remember Me ===
In April 2018, Danielson released "Broken", the lead single from his forthcoming debut studio album. Danielson said was inspired by a friend who had experienced a number of sexual assaults.

In July 2018, Danielson released "Always", which was followed by "I'll Be Waiting" in September and "I'm Falling in Love" in October. On 19 October 2018, Danielson released his debut studio album Yours. Yours peaked at number 27 on the Swedish charts.

In January 2019, Danielson released "Power" which was followed by "Bleed Out" on 5 March. Both tracks were the lead singles from his third EP, titled Run to You, which was released on 29 March 2019.

In September 2019, Danielson released "Silence", his first on new IOD label, after signing with Universal Music Group.

In April 2020, Danielson released his second studio album, Remember to Remember Me. The album title is a message to the listener to follow along on his personal journey, where no topic is too delicate to explore. In the songs "Light Up", "Silence" and "Religion", Danielson reflects on his own relationship with anxiety and his message that no one should ever feel alone in their struggle with anxiety.

Per Magnusson from Aftonbladet gave the album 3 out of 5 saying "Isak Danielson makes pop music so emotional and sad that it almost forgets to breathe" and that "he sings well beyond his age".

=== 2021–present: Tomorrow Never Came and King of a Tragedy ===
On 5 March 2021, Danielson released Tomorrow Never Came, followed by the EP Live in Stockholm in July 2021.

Danielson's fourth studio album, King of a Tragedy, was released on 8 April 2022.

== Discography ==
=== Albums ===
Title	Details	Peak chart positions
Title	Details	SWE
Yours	Released: 19 October 2018; Label: Isak Danielson; Formats: CD, digital download, streaming	27
Remember to Remember Me	Released: 17 April 2020; Label: IOD, Universal Music; Formats: CD, digital download, streaming	—
Tomorrow Never Came	Released: 5 March 2021; Label: IOD, Universal Music; Formats: digital download, streaming	—
King of a Tragedy	Released: 8 April 2022; Label: IOD, Universal Music; Formats: CD, digital download, streaming	—
Truly Yours, Isak	Released 27 September 2024; Label: IOD, Universal Music; Formats: CD, digital download, streaming	—

=== Extended plays ===
Title	Details
Volume One	Released: 25 March 2015; Label: Isak Danielson; Formats: Digital download, streaming
Volume Two	Released: 14 October 2016; Label: Isak Danielson; Formats: Digital download, streaming
Run to You	Released: 29 March 2019; Label: Isak Danielson; Formats: Digital download, streaming
Live in Stockholm	Released: 2 July 2021; Label: IOD Entertainment; Formats: Digital download, streaming

=== Singles ===
Title	Year	Certifications	Album
"Long Live This Love"	2014		Non-album singles
"Say Something"	2014		Non-album singles
"Falling Into You"	2015		Volume One
"Ending"	2015		Volume One
"Remember"	2016		Volume Two
"I Don't See You"	2017		Volume Two
"Broken"	2018	GLF: Platinum; IFPI NOR: Platinum	Yours
"Always"	2018	GLF: Gold; IFPI NOR: Gold	Yours
"I'll Be Waiting"	2018	GLF: Gold	Yours
"Hold My Hand"	2018		Yours
"I Am Falling in Love"	2018	GLF: Gold	Yours
"Power"	2019		Run to You
"Bleed Out"	2019		Run to You
"Every Song for You" (live in Studio Brun)	2019		Remember to Remember Me
"Silence"	2019		Remember to Remember Me
"Snowman"	2019		Non-album single
"Light Up"	2020		Remember to Remember Me
"Part of Me"	2020		Remember to Remember Me
"I Don't Need Your Love"	2020		Remember to Remember Me
"Love Me Wrong"	2020		Remember to Remember Me
"Domino"	2020		Remember to Remember Me
"Almost Heaven"	2020		Tomorrow Never Came
"When You Believe"	2020		Non-album single
"Face My Fears"	2021		Tomorrow Never Came
"If You Ever Forget That You Love Me"	2021		Tomorrow Never Came
"Start Again"	2021		Tomorrow Never Came
"Feel My Love"	2021		Tomorrow Never Came
"Save Me Now" (with Mike Perry)	2021		Non-album single
"Good Things Comes to Those Who Wait"	2022		King of a Tragedy
"King of a Tragedy"	2022		King of a Tragedy
"Believe" (with April Snow)	2022		Non-album single
"Say That Everything Will Be Alright" (with Irya Gmeyner)	2022		Thin Blue Line
"White Ferrari" (with Alba August)	2023		Non-album single
"Afterparty"	2024		Truly Yours, Isak
"Sweat"	2024		Truly Yours, Isak
"Afloat"	2024		Truly Yours, Isak
"Desperate Guy"	2024		Truly Yours, Isak
"Always You"	2026		Non-album singles
"Stockholm"	2026		Non-album singles
"Goodbye to a Lover Again"	2026		Non-album singles
