= List of Billboard Hot 100 number ones of 2012 =

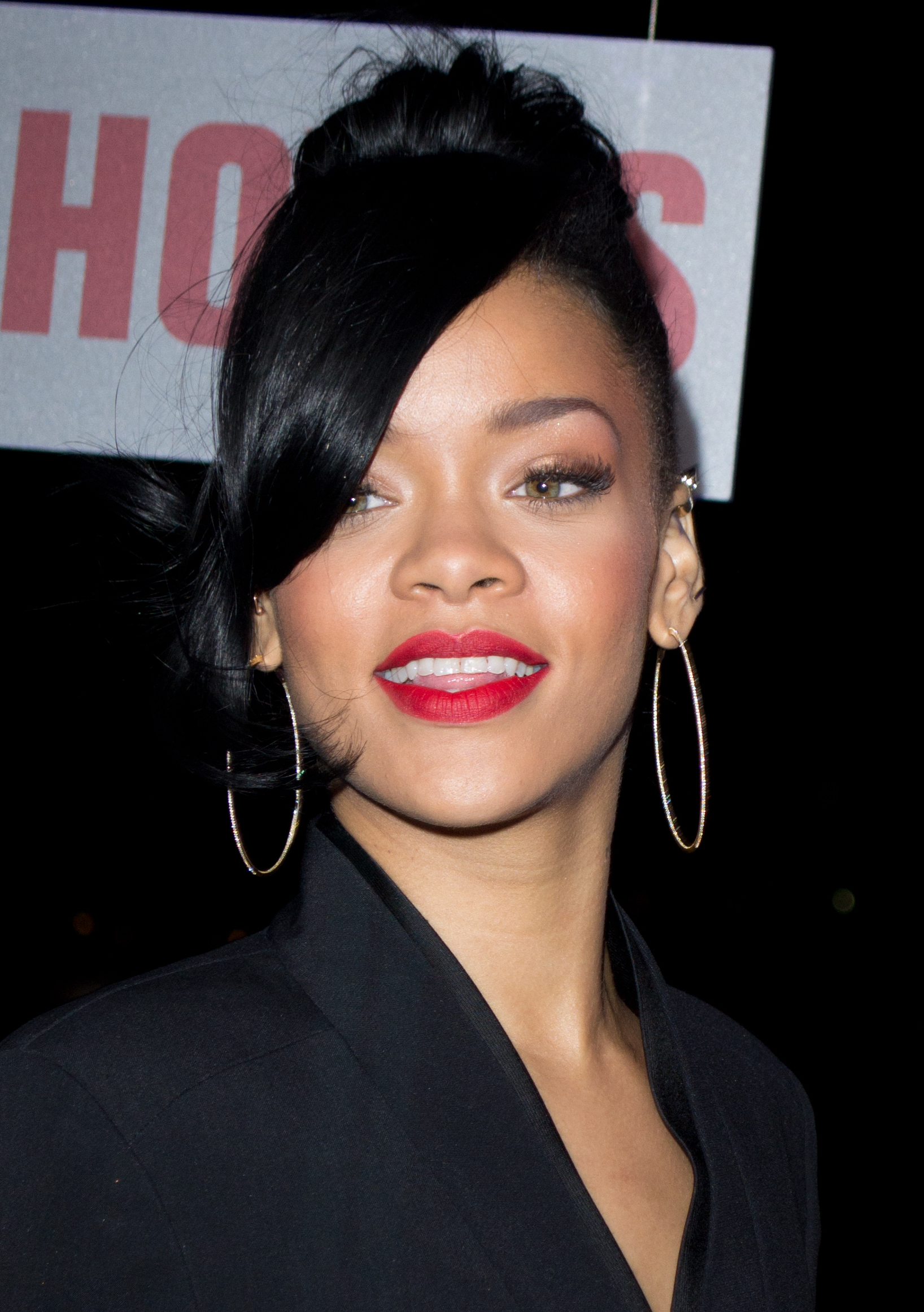
Rihanna's "Diamonds" made her one of the three artists with the fifth-most number ones in the chart's history.

The Billboard Hot 100 is a chart that ranks the best-performing songs of the United States. Its data, published by Billboard magazine and compiled by Nielsen SoundScan, is based collectively on each single's weekly physical and digital sales, as well as airplay. Throughout 2012, a total of 12 singles claimed the number-one position. Although 13 singles topped the chart, singer Rihanna's "We Found Love", featuring Calvin Harris, had previously spent eight weeks atop the chart in late 2011, and thus excluded.

In 2012, six acts achieved their first US number-one single, either as a lead artist or a featured guest: Fun, Janelle Monáe, Gotye, Kimbra, Carly Rae Jepsen and Taylor Swift. Two collaboration singles topped the chart, "We Are Young" and "Somebody That I Used to Know". Throughout the year, no musical acts achieved multiple number-one singles.^{[A]} Gotye's "Somebody That I Used to Know", featuring Kimbra, became the year's biggest-selling single, topping the Billboard Year-End Hot 100.

Carly Rae Jepsen's "Call Me Maybe" and Maroon 5's "One More Night" tied for the longest-running number-one single of the year, both spending nine consecutive weeks atop the chart. Gotye and Kimbra's "Somebody That I Used to Know" was the second longest-running one, topping the Hot 100 for eight consecutive weeks. Both Fun's "We Are Young and Bruno Mars' "Locked Out of Heaven" spent a total of six weeks at number one,^{[B]} while Rihanna's "Diamonds", Kelly Clarkson's "Stronger (What Doesn't Kill You)" and Taylor Swift's "We Are Never Ever Getting Back Together", tied with three weeks atop the chart. "Diamonds" is Rihanna's twelfth Hot 100 number-one single, tying her with Madonna and The Supremes as the artists with the fifth-most number ones in the chart's history.

== Chart history ==
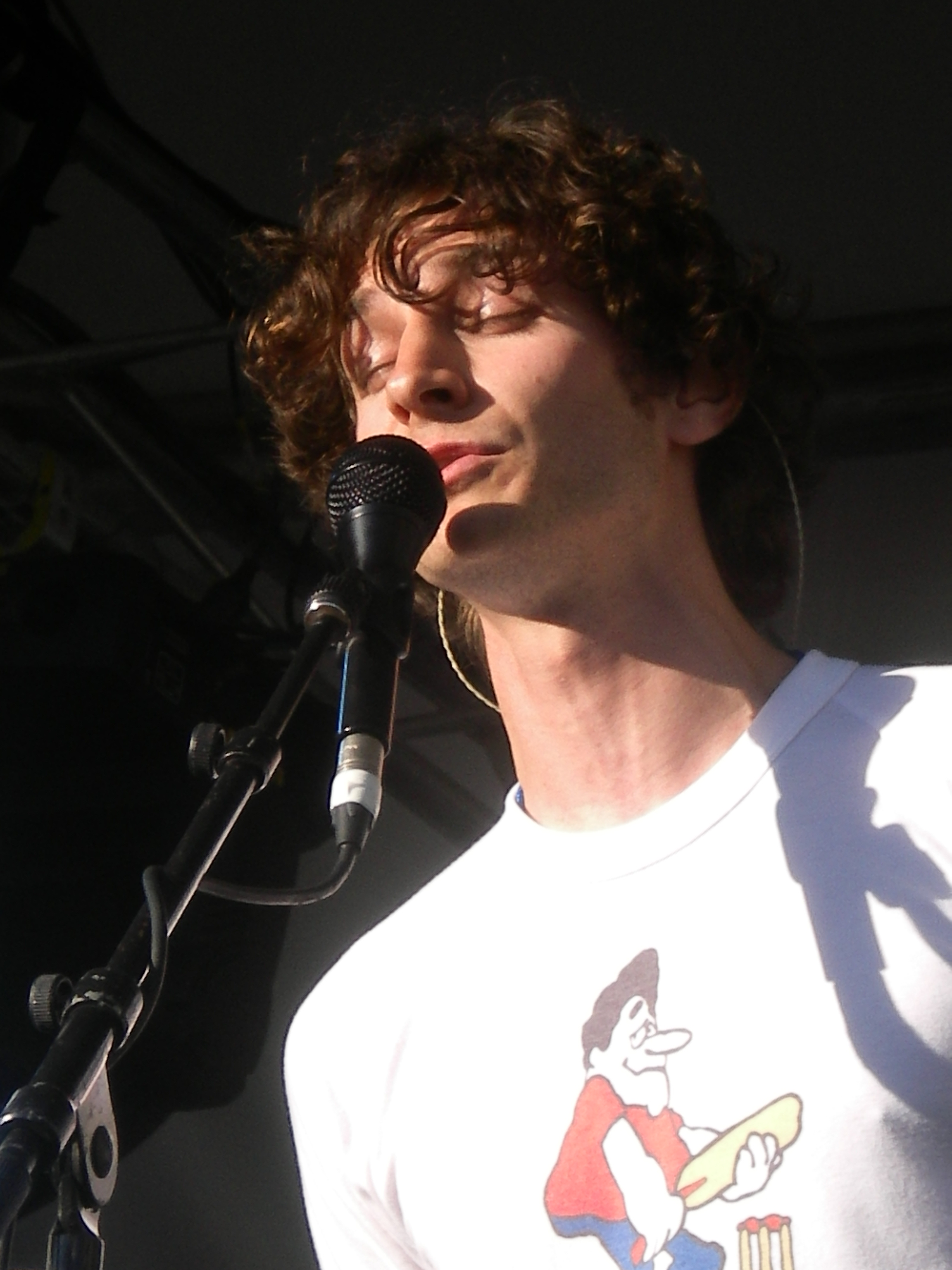
Gotye earned his first Hot 100 number-one with "Somebody That I Used to Know", featuring Kimbra. In overall chart progress the single became Billboard's best performing song of the year.

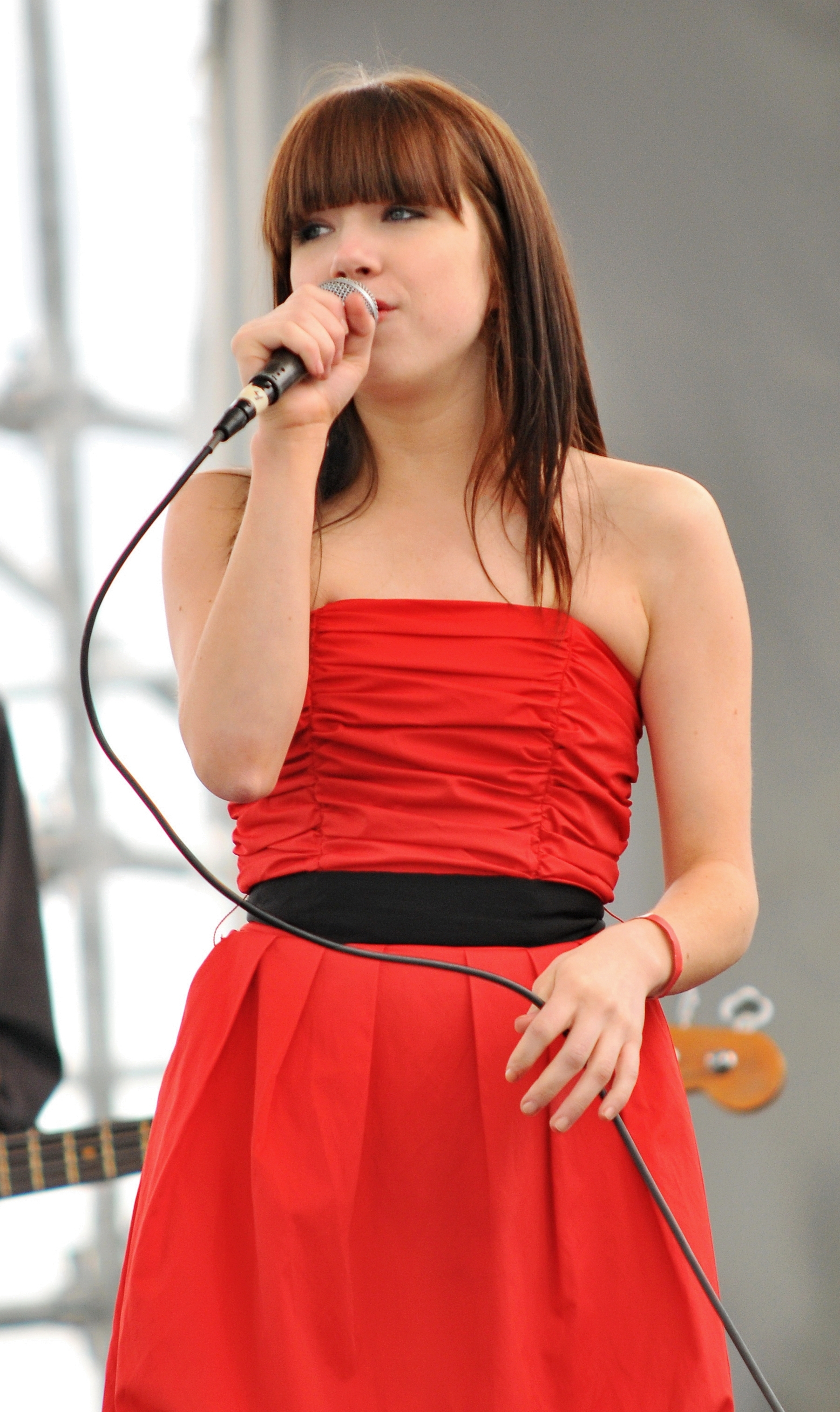
Carly Rae Jepsen earned her first chart number-one with "Call Me Maybe", which tied with One More Night" as the longest-running chart-topper of the year.

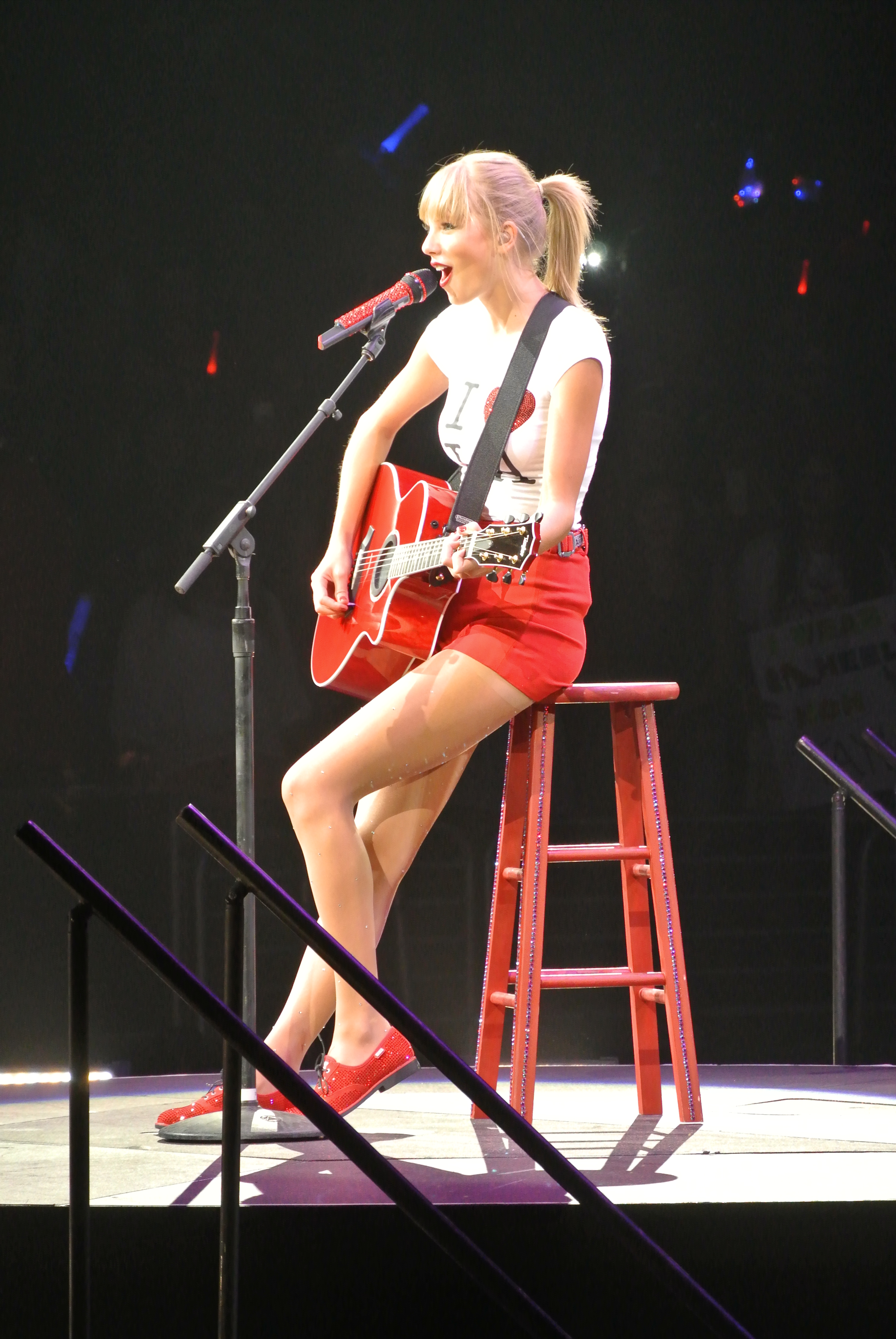
Taylor Swift earned her first number-one song on the chart with "We Are Never Ever Getting Back Together", and the song also topped on the Hot Country Songs.

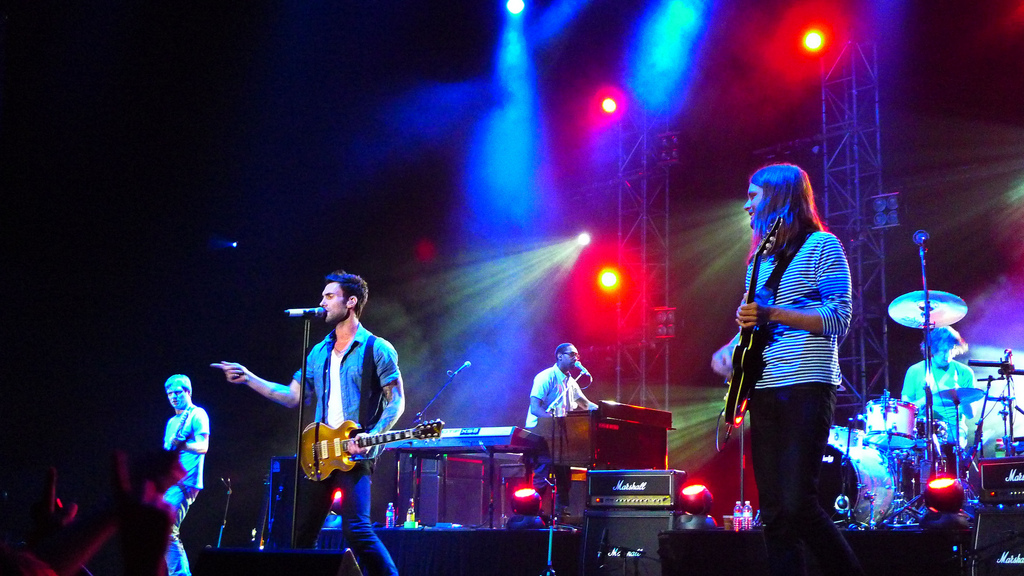
Maroon 5's "One More Night" tied with Carly Rae Jepsen's "Call Me Maybe" to become the longest-running chart-topper of the year

Key
†	Indicates best-performing single of 2012

No.	Issue date	Song	Artist(s)	Ref.
1010	January 7	"Sexy and I Know It"	LMFAO	
1010	January 14	"Sexy and I Know It"	LMFAO	
re	January 21	"We Found Love"	Rihanna featuring Calvin Harris	
re	January 28	"We Found Love"	Rihanna featuring Calvin Harris	
1011	February 4	"Set Fire to the Rain"	Adele	
1011	February 11	"Set Fire to the Rain"	Adele	
1012	February 18	"Stronger (What Doesn't Kill You)"	Kelly Clarkson	
1012	February 25	"Stronger (What Doesn't Kill You)"	Kelly Clarkson	
1013	March 3	"Part of Me"	Katy Perry	
re	March 10	"Stronger (What Doesn't Kill You)"	Kelly Clarkson	
1014	March 17	"We Are Young"	Fun featuring Janelle Monáe	
1014	March 24	"We Are Young"	Fun featuring Janelle Monáe	
1014	March 31	"We Are Young"	Fun featuring Janelle Monáe	
1014	April 7	"We Are Young"	Fun featuring Janelle Monáe	
1014	April 14	"We Are Young"	Fun featuring Janelle Monáe	
1014	April 21	"We Are Young"	Fun featuring Janelle Monáe	
1015	April 28	"Somebody That I Used to Know"†	Gotye featuring Kimbra	
1015	May 5	"Somebody That I Used to Know"†	Gotye featuring Kimbra	
1015	May 12	"Somebody That I Used to Know"†	Gotye featuring Kimbra	
1015	May 19	"Somebody That I Used to Know"†	Gotye featuring Kimbra	
1015	May 26	"Somebody That I Used to Know"†	Gotye featuring Kimbra	
1015	June 2	"Somebody That I Used to Know"†	Gotye featuring Kimbra	
1015	June 9	"Somebody That I Used to Know"†	Gotye featuring Kimbra	
1015	June 16	"Somebody That I Used to Know"†	Gotye featuring Kimbra	
1016	June 23	"Call Me Maybe"	Carly Rae Jepsen	
1016	June 30	"Call Me Maybe"	Carly Rae Jepsen	
1016	July 7	"Call Me Maybe"	Carly Rae Jepsen	
1016	July 14	"Call Me Maybe"	Carly Rae Jepsen	
1016	July 21	"Call Me Maybe"	Carly Rae Jepsen	
1016	July 28	"Call Me Maybe"	Carly Rae Jepsen	
1016	August 4	"Call Me Maybe"	Carly Rae Jepsen	
1016	August 11	"Call Me Maybe"	Carly Rae Jepsen	
1016	August 18	"Call Me Maybe"	Carly Rae Jepsen	
1017	August 25	"Whistle"	Flo Rida	
1018	September 1	"We Are Never Ever Getting Back Together"	Taylor Swift	
1018	September 8	"We Are Never Ever Getting Back Together"	Taylor Swift	
re	September 15	"Whistle"	Flo Rida	
re	September 22	"We Are Never Ever Getting Back Together"	Taylor Swift	
1019	September 29	"One More Night"	Maroon 5	
1019	October 6	"One More Night"	Maroon 5	
1019	October 13	"One More Night"	Maroon 5	
1019	October 20	"One More Night"	Maroon 5	
1019	October 27	"One More Night"	Maroon 5	
1019	November 3	"One More Night"	Maroon 5	
1019	November 10	"One More Night"	Maroon 5	
1019	November 17	"One More Night"	Maroon 5	
1019	November 24	"One More Night"	Maroon 5	
1020	December 1	"Diamonds"	Rihanna	
1020	December 8	"Diamonds"	Rihanna	
1020	December 15	"Diamonds"	Rihanna	
1021	December 22	"Locked Out of Heaven"	Bruno Mars	
1021	December 29	"Locked Out of Heaven"	Bruno Mars	

== Number-one artists ==
List of number-one artists by total weeks at number one
Position	Artist	Weeks at No. 1
1	Carly Rae Jepsen	9
1	Maroon 5	9
3	Gotye	8
3	Kimbra	8
5	Fun	6
5	Janelle Monáe	6
7	Rihanna	5
8	Kelly Clarkson	3
8	Taylor Swift	3
10	LMFAO	2
10	Calvin Harris	2
10	Adele	2
10	Flo Rida	2
10	Bruno Mars	2
15	Katy Perry	1

== See also ==
- 2012 in American music
- List of Billboard number-one singles
- List of Billboard Hot 100 top-ten singles in 2012
- List of Billboard Hot 100 number-one singles of the 2010s

== Notes ==
- A Rihanna achieved two number-one singles in 2012, "We Found Love" and "Diamonds". However, the former was excluded from the count because it previously topped the Hot 100 in late 2011.
- B "Locked Out of Heaven" spent two weeks atop the Hot 100 in 2012 and four weeks in 2013. Combined, the single peaked at number one on the chart for a total of six weeks.
