= List of Billboard Hot 100 top-ten singles in 2012 =

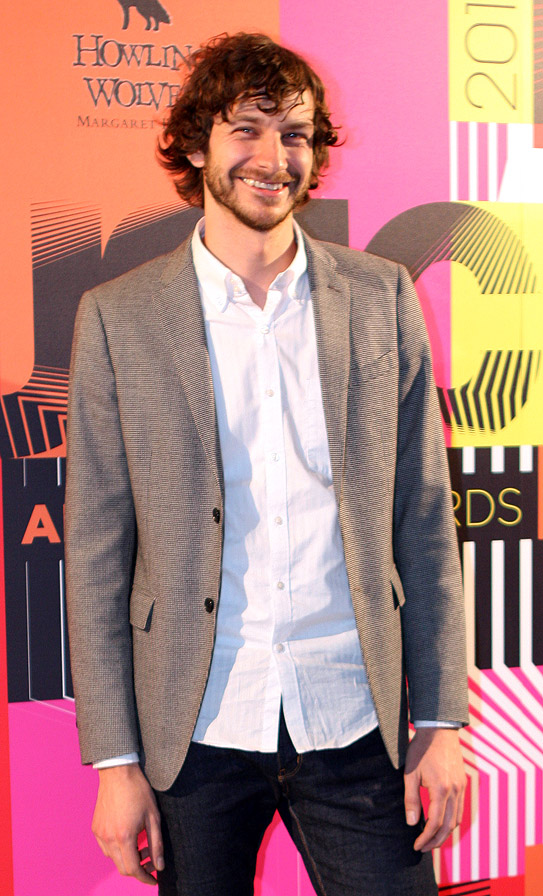
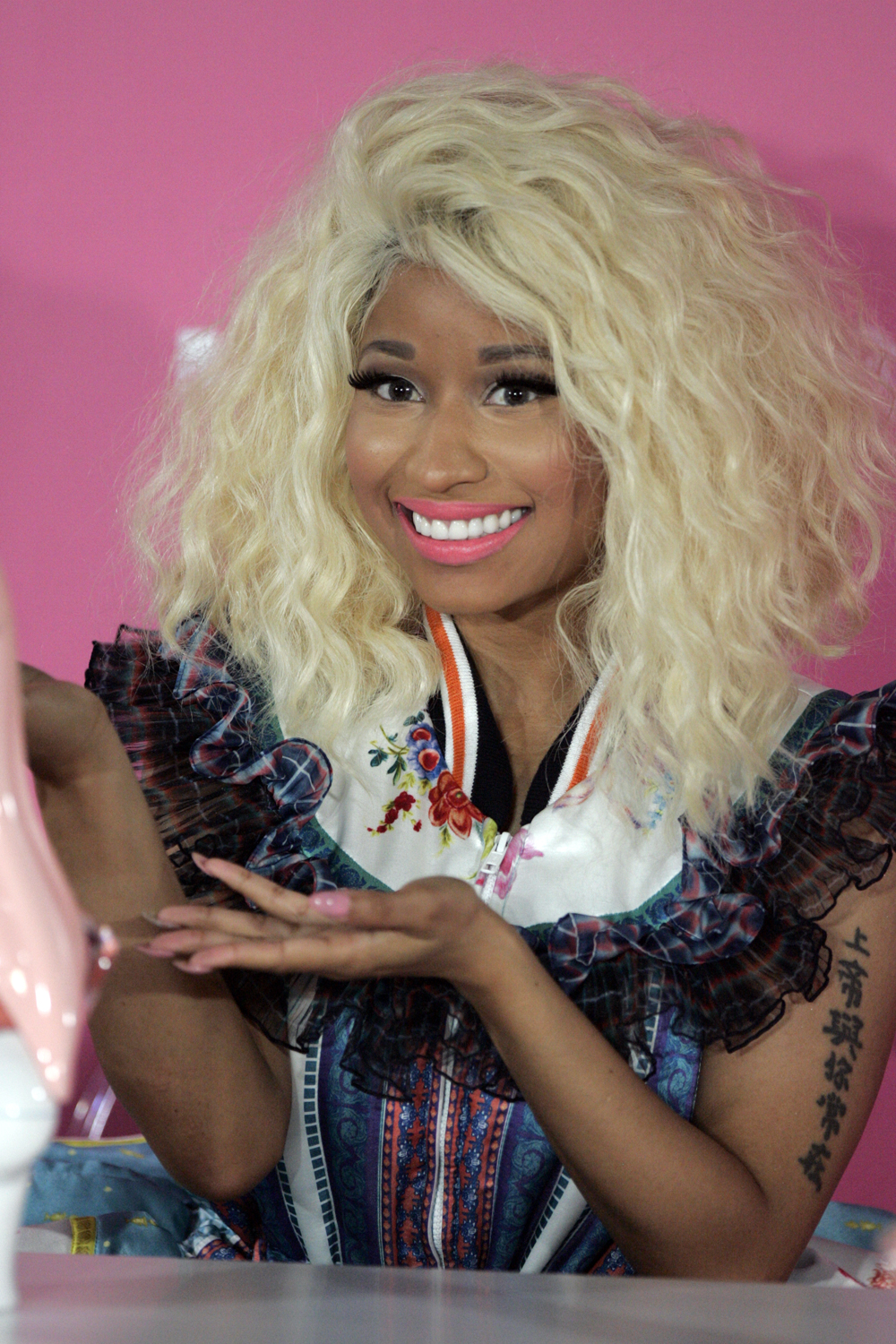
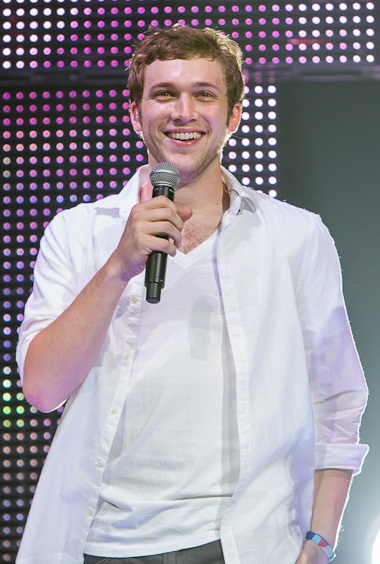
Gotye, Nicki Minaj and Phillip Phillips (pictured in order) Gotye's "Somebody That I Used to Know" was number-one single for 8 weeks and the longest-running top-ten single of the year, spending twenty-four weeks in the tier. Rapper Nicki Minaj garnered five top-ten singles during the year. Phillip Phillips's "Home" became the first song to enter the top ten in separate chart runs in a single calendar year when it re-entered on the weeks ending August 18, 2012 and December 8, 2012.

This is a list of singles that charted in the top ten of the Billboard Hot 100, an all-genre singles chart, in 2012.

Sixty-two singles charted in the top ten during the year. Fifty acts scored a top-ten hit, with seventeen achieving their first hits as lead or featured artists. Rapper Nicki Minaj garnered five top-ten singles during the year, the most of any artist, while Gotye's "Somebody That I Used to Know" was the longest-running top-ten single of the year, spending twenty-four weeks in the tier.

Following her death on February 11, 2012, singer Whitney Houston placed three re-entries in the top fifty of the Hot 100 on the week ending February 25, 2012, led by "I Will Always Love You" at number seven. Such re-entries of catalog songs are rare as Billboard maintains a policy deeming songs ineligible to chart due to moving to the recurrent list after twenty weeks if ranking below number fifty. After Houston's death, however, an adjustment in this policy allowed catalog songs to re-enter the chart's upper half if sales and airplay activity merit inclusion, as was the case with "I Will Always Love You", which surged after the singer's death in digital sales by 6,723% and in airplay by 915% from the previous week.

Phillip Phillips's "Home" became the first song to enter the top ten in separate chart runs in a single calendar year when it re-entered on the weeks ending August 18, 2012 and December 8, 2012 . The song debuted at number ten on the week ending June 9, 2012 and spent a sole week in the top ten before falling off the chart three weeks later.

== Top-ten singles ==
Key

- ↑ – indicates single's top 10 entry was also its Hot 100 debut
- † – indicates best performing song of the year
- (#) – 2012 year-end top 10 single position and rank
- The "weeks in top ten" column reflects each song's entire chart life, not just its run during 2012. (Exception: Please see the note below regarding Whitney Houston's one song that recharted in the top ten.)

List of Billboard Hot 100 top ten singles which peaked in 2012
Top ten entry date	Single	Artist(s)	Peak	Peak date	Weeks in top ten	References
Singles from 2011
October 8	"Sexy and I Know It"	LMFAO	1	January 7	21	
October 29	"Young, Wild & Free" ↑^{[C]}^{[E]}^{[H]}	Snoop Dogg and Wiz Khalifa featuring Bruno Mars	7	March 17	6	
November 19	"Good Feeling"^{[H]}	Flo Rida	3	January 28	16	
December 3	"Take Care" ↑^{[I]}	Drake featuring Rihanna	7	March 24	4	
December 3	"The One That Got Away"	Katy Perry	3	January 7	11	
December 17	"Niggas in Paris"	Jay-Z and Kanye West	5	January 7	8	
Singles from 2012
January 7	"Dance (A$$)"	Big Sean featuring Nicki Minaj	10	January 7	1	
January 7	"Set Fire to the Rain"	Adele	1	February 4	14	
January 21	"I Won't Give Up" ↑	Jason Mraz	8	January 21	1	
January 28	"Rack City"^{[D]}	Tyga	7	February 18	4	
January 28	"Turn Me On"^{[H]}	David Guetta featuring Nicki Minaj	4	February 4	10	
February 4	"Domino"	Jessie J	6	February 18	3	
February 4	"Stronger (What Doesn't Kill You)" (#7)	Kelly Clarkson	1	February 18	16	
February 25	"Give Me All Your Luvin'"	Madonna featuring Nicki Minaj and M.I.A.	10	February 25	1	
February 25	"I Will Always Love You"^{[F]}α	Whitney Houston	3	March 3	2	
February 25	"We Are Young" (#3)	Fun featuring Janelle Monáe	1	March 17	22	
March 3	"Part of Me" ↑	Katy Perry	1	March 3	9	
March 3	"Starships" (#9) ↑	Nicki Minaj	5	April 7	21	
March 3	"Turn Up the Music" ↑	Chris Brown	10	March 3	1	
March 10	"Glad You Came" (#6)	The Wanted	3	March 31	15	
March 17	"Somebody That I Used to Know" † (#1)	Gotye featuring Kimbra	1	April 28	24	
March 31	"Wild Ones"	Flo Rida featuring Sia	5	May 19	14	
April 14	"Boyfriend" ↑	Justin Bieber	2	April 14	12	
April 14	"Call Me Maybe" (#2)	Carly Rae Jepsen	1	June 23	23	
April 14	"What Makes You Beautiful" (#10)	One Direction	4	April 21	13	
May 5	"Payphone" (#4) ↑	Maroon 5 featuring Wiz Khalifa	2	May 26	19	
May 26	"Drive By"	Train	10	May 26	2	
June 16	"Where Have You Been"	Rihanna	5	July 7	11	
June 23	"Wide Awake"	Katy Perry	2	August 11	13	
July 7	"Lights" (#5)	Ellie Goulding	2	August 18	14	
July 7	"Scream"	Usher	9	August 4	6	
July 14	"Titanium"	David Guetta featuring Sia	7	July 21	8	
July 28	"Blow Me (One Last Kiss)"^{[K]}	Pink	5	September 29	11	
July 28	"Whistle"	Flo Rida	1	August 25	12	
August 25	"Some Nights"	Fun	3	September 29	19	
September 1	"As Long as You Love Me"	Justin Bieber featuring Big Sean	6	September 29	12	
September 1	"One More Night"	Maroon 5	1	September 29	21	
September 1	"We Are Never Ever Getting Back Together"^{[M]}	Taylor Swift	1	September 1	13	
September 8	"Good Time"^{[L]}	Owl City and Carly Rae Jepsen	8	September 15	7	
September 15	"Everybody Talks"	Neon Trees	6	September 15	3	
September 22	"Too Close"	Alex Clare	7	October 27	10	
October 6	"Gangnam Style"	Psy	2	October 6	12	
October 13	"Begin Again" ↑	Taylor Swift	7	October 13	1	
October 20	"Live While We're Young" ↑	One Direction	3	October 20	1	
October 20	"Red" ↑	Taylor Swift	6	October 20	1	
October 20	"Skyfall" ↑	Adele	8	October 20	1	
October 27	"Die Young"	Kesha	2	December 8	12	
November 3	"Diamonds"	Rihanna	1	December 1	15	
November 3	"Let Me Love You (Until You Learn to Love Yourself)"	Ne-Yo	6	December 1	8	
November 10	"Don't Wake Me Up"	Chris Brown	10	November 10	1	
November 10	"Locked Out of Heaven"	Bruno Mars	1	December 22	20	
November 24	"I Cry"	Flo Rida	6	December 22	9	
December 1	"Ho Hey"	The Lumineers	3	December 29	14	

α "I Will Always Love You" originally entered the top ten and peaked at number one on the week ending November 28, 1992, spending 16 weeks in the tier in its first chart run. See List of Billboard Hot 100 top 10 singles in 1992 for more. The above entry for the single reflects its run in 2012 only.

=== 2011 peaks ===
List of Billboard Hot 100 top ten singles in 2012 which peaked in 2011
Top ten entry date	Single	Artist(s)	Peak	Peak date	Weeks in top ten	References
April 16	"Rolling in the Deep"^{[G]}	Adele	1	May 21	20	
June 4	"Party Rock Anthem"^{[A]}	LMFAO featuring Lauren Bennett and GoonRock	1	July 16	29	
September 10	"Stereo Hearts"^{[B]}	Gym Class Heroes featuring Adam Levine	4	October 15	15	
September 17	"Someone like You"^{[G]}	Adele	1	September 17	20	
October 15	"We Found Love" (#8)	Rihanna featuring Calvin Harris	1	November 12	23	
November 26	"It Will Rain"	Bruno Mars	3	December 10	13	

=== 2013 peaks ===
List of Billboard Hot 100 top ten singles in 2012 which peaked in 2013
Top ten entry date	Single	Artist(s)	Peak	Peak date	Weeks in top ten	References
June 9	"Home" ↑^{[J]}^{[N]}	Phillip Phillips	6	January 19	13	
October 27	"I Knew You Were Trouble" ↑^{[O]}	Taylor Swift	2	January 12	16	
December 22	"Beauty and a Beat"	Justin Bieber featuring Nicki Minaj	5	January 5	10	

== Notes ==
^{A} The single re-entered the top ten on the week ending January 7, 2012.
^{B} The single re-entered the top ten on the week ending January 14, 2012.
^{C} The single re-entered the top ten on the week ending January 28, 2012.
^{D} The single re-entered the top ten on the week ending February 11, 2012.
^{E} The single re-entered the top ten on the week ending February 18, 2012.
^{F} The single re-entered the top ten on the week ending February 25, 2012.
^{G} The single re-entered the top ten on the week ending March 3, 2012.
^{H} The single re-entered the top ten on the week ending March 10, 2012.
^{I} The single re-entered the top ten on the week ending March 24, 2012.
^{J} The single re-entered the top ten on the week ending August 18, 2012.
^{K} The single re-entered the top ten on the week ending September 22, 2012.
^{L} The single re-entered the top ten on the week ending October 27, 2012.
^{M} The single re-entered the top ten on the week ending November 17, 2012.
^{N} The single re-entered the top ten on the week ending December 8, 2012.
^{O} The single re-entered the top ten on the week ending December 29, 2012.

== Artists with most top-ten songs ==
List of artists by total songs peaking in the top-ten
Artist	Numbers of songs
Nicki Minaj	5
Adele	4
Flo Rida	4
Rihanna	4
Taylor Swift	4
Bruno Mars	3
Justin Bieber	3
Katy Perry	3
Big Sean	2
Carly Rae Jepsen	2
Chris Brown	2
David Guetta	2
Fun	2
LMFAO	2
Maroon 5	2
One Direction	2
Sia	2
Wiz Khalifa	2

== See also ==
- 2012 in American music
- List of Billboard Hot 100 number ones of 2012
- Billboard Year-End Hot 100 singles of 2012
