= Awa Santesson-Sey =

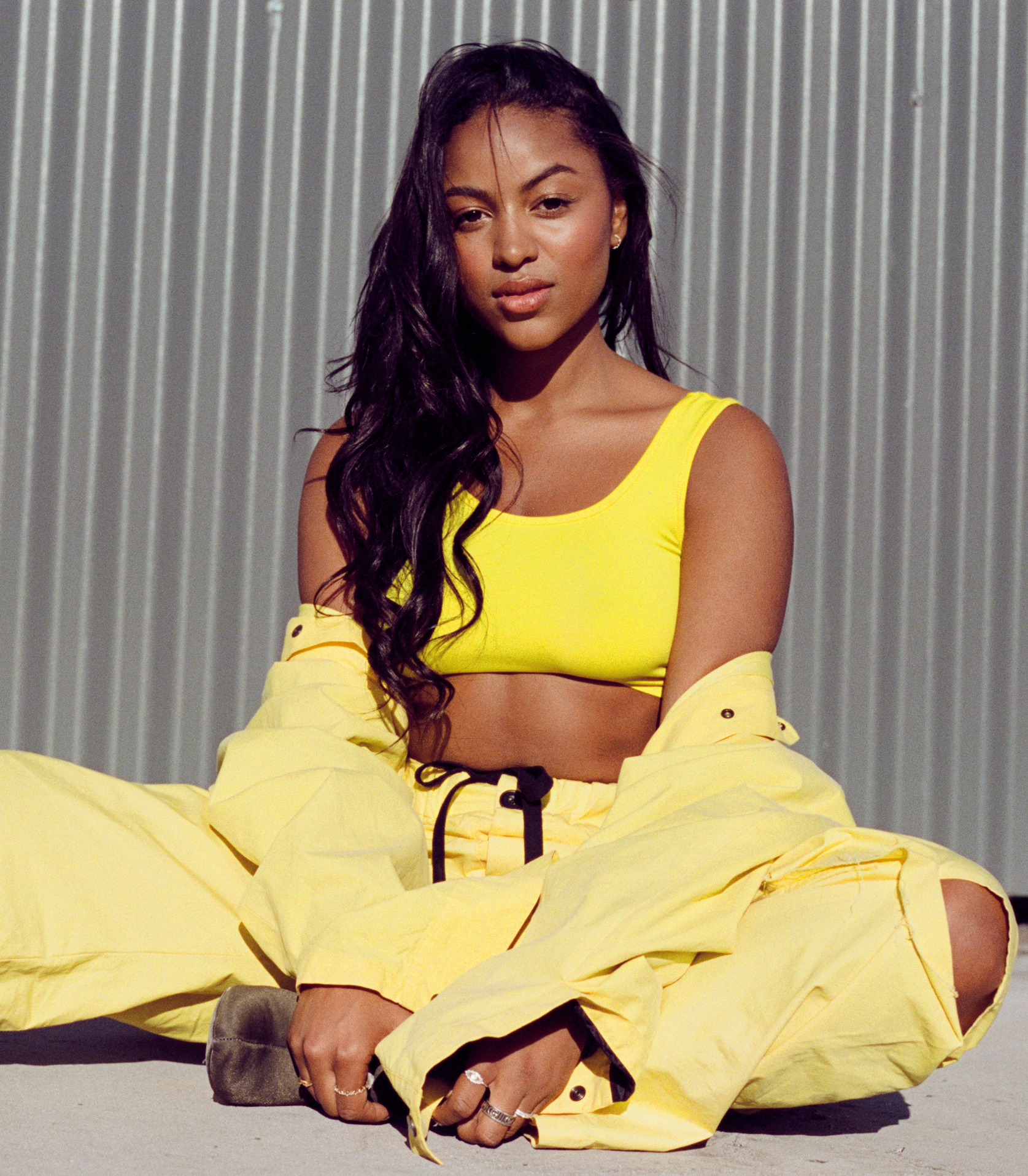

Background information
- Also known as: Awa
- Born: Awa Matilda Isakine Santesson-Sey; 6 July 1997 (age 29)
- Origin: Stockholm, Sweden
- Genres: Pop, R&B, soul
- Occupation: Singer
- Years active: 2012–present
- Label: Columbia Records
- Website: www.thisisawa.co

Awa Matilda Isakine Santesson-Sey (born 6 July 1997), known mononymously as Awa (stylised as AWA), is a Swedish singer based in London. Her father is Senegalese, her mother Swedish.

At age 12, deciding she wanted to study classical music, she applied to and later attended Adolf Fredrik's Music School in Stockholm.

== Career ==
Awa was the winner of the first series of the Swedish version of The X Factor in 2012, at age 15. In 2013, she won a Nickelodeon Kids' Choice Award and released the single "Not Ready to Say Goodbye". Taking her time to work out her sound, she released the single "Obvious" in 2015. During this time, Awa worked with producers and collaborators including Aston Rudi and Show N Prove.

In 2019, Awa was signed to Columbia Records. She released three songs on the label, followed by a six-track EP titled cry.baby. "F**kin' Love Songs (ft. Ebenezer)" was premiered by Julie Adenuga on Beats 1 and was Yasmin Evans' 'Track of the Week' on BBC Radio 1Xtra. Complex premiered the official video. In November 2019, Vevo named Awa one of its "Artists to Watch" for 2020.

== Discography ==
=== Singles ===
Title	Release Date	Label	Producer
"F**kin' Love Songs" ft. Ebenezer	2019	Columbia Records	Ebenezer
"Comfortable"	2019	Columbia Records	Aalias
"Like I Do"	2019	Columbia Records	Aston Rudi, Tre Jean-Marie
"Too Late For That" (feat. BJ the Chicago Kid)	2020	Columbia Records, Spirit Music Group	Show N Prove, Mainey
"Feelings" (feat. JB Scofield)	2020	Columbia Records	JIM OUMA
"Live & Learn"	2020	Columbia Records, MNRK Music Group	TJOnline
"24/7"	2021	Columbia Records, Warner Chappell Music	Axident, Chris Loco
"Who's Asking"	2022	Alacran Records	Ebenezer
"Daylight Robbery"	2023	Pure Intuition	Adrian McLeod
"Shining Star"	2023	Pure Intuition	LOXE
