= X Factor (Swedish TV series) =

- Created by: Simon Cowell
- Presented by: David Hellenius
- Judges: Orup; Andreas Carlsson; Ison; Marie Serneholt
- Country of origin: Sweden
- No. of series: 1

Production
- Running time: 60–120 minutes
- Production companies: FremantleMedia; SYCOtv

Original release
- Network: TV4
- Release: September 9 – December 7, 2012

Related
- Idol; The Voice Sverige

X Factor was the Swedish version of The X Factor, with the only season of the series debuting on September 9, 2012 and ending on December 7, 2012. The winner of the series was Awa Santesson-Sey. TV4 announced in January 2013 that Idol, another singing talent show seeking to discover the best singer through nationwide auditions, would return in 2013 and that X Factor would not continue.

== Series summary ==
Contestant in "Boys" category
Contestant in "Girls" category
Contestant in "Over 25s" category
Contestant in "Groups" category

Series	Start	Finish	Winner	Runner-up	Third place	Winning mentor	Main host	Main judges
One	9 September 2012	7 December 2012	Awa Santesson-Sey	Benny Hult	Isak Danielson	Andreas Carlsson	David Hellenius	Orup; Andreas Carlsson; Ison; Marie Serneholt

== Judges' categories and their contestants ==
In the show's only season, each judge was allocated a category to mentor and chose three acts to progress to the live shows. This table shows which category each judge was allocated and which acts he or she put through to the live shows.

Key:

– Winning judge/category. Winners are in bold, eliminated contestants in small font.

Series	Orup	Andreas Carlsson	Ison	Marie Serneholt
**One**	**Over 25s** Benny Hult; Alexander Holmgren; Freja Modin	**Girls**; **Awa Santesson-Sey**; Manda Nilsénius; Frida Sandén	**Boys**; Isak Danielson; Malcolm Brandin; Oscar Zia	**Groups**; J.E.M; Hey Mary; NJOY

== The only season ==
The only season of X Factor premiered on September 9, 2012 and ended on December 7, 2012. Leona Lewis, Axwell and E.M.D. were guest judges of the series at one point. Also, Britney Spears appeared in a video message to the contestants in the Girls category. One Direction and Olly Murs also performed on the live results shows.

24 acts reached judge's houses. Orup was helped by Eric Gadd, Ison by Leona Lewis, Carlsson by Axwell and Marie by E.M.D.

The twelve eliminated acts were:

- Boys: Simon Issa, Adam Kanyama, Lukas Wallströmer
- Girls: Sabina Ddumba, Juliette Holmqvist, Sara Nutti
- Over 25s: Kristin Amparo, Sofia Emefors, Christine Zakrisson
- Groups: Fusion, Natural Blondes, Sentiment Falls

=== Contestants ===
Key:

– Winner
– Runner-up

Category (mentor)	Acts		
Boys (Ison)	Malcolm Brandin	Isak Danielson	Oscar Zia
Girls (Carlsson)	Manda Nilsénius	Frida Sandén	Awa Santesson-Sey
Over 25s (Orup)	Alexander Holmgren	Benny Hult	Freja Modin
Groups (Serneholt)	Hey Mary	J.E.M	NJOY

=== Results summary ===
	Week 1	Week 2	Week 3	Week 4	Week 5	Week 6	Week 7	Week 8	Week 9	Week 10	
	Week 1	Week 2	Week 3	Week 4	Week 5	Week 6	Week 7	Week 8	Week 9	Part 1	Part 2
Awa Santesson-Sey	Safe	Safe	Safe	Safe	Safe	Safe	Safe	Safe	Safe	Safe	**Winner**
Benny Hult	Safe	Safe	Safe	Safe	Safe	Safe	Safe	Safe	Safe	Safe	**Runner-Up**
Isak Danielson	Safe	Safe	Safe	Safe	Safe	Safe	5th	Safe	3rd	3rd	Eliminated (Week 10)
J.E.M	Safe	Safe	Safe	Safe	Safe	6th	Safe	Bottom two	4th	Eliminated (Week 9)	
Malcolm Brandin	Safe	Safe	Safe	Safe	Safe	Safe	Safe	Bottom two	Eliminated (Week 8)		
Alexander Holmgren	Safe	Safe	Safe	Safe	7th	Safe	6th	Eliminated (Week 7)			
Manda Nilsénius	Safe	Safe	Bottom two	8th	Safe	7th	Eliminated (Week 6)				
Oscar Zia	Safe	Safe	Safe	Safe	8th	Eliminated (Week 5)					
Hey Mary	Safe	Bottom two	Safe	9th	9th	Eliminated (Week 5)					
Frida Sandén	Safe	Safe	Bottom two	Eliminated (Week 3)							
Freja Modin	Bottom two	Bottom two	Eliminated (Week 2)								
NJOY	Bottom two	Eliminated (Week 1)									
Bottom two	Freja Modin, NJOY	Freja Modin, Hey Mary	Frida Sandén, Manda Nilsénius	Hey Mary, Manda Nilsénius	Alexander Holmgren, Oscar Zia	J.E.M, Manda Nilsénius	Alexander Holmgren, Isak Danielson	J.E.M, Malcolm Brandin	No judges' vote or final showdown: public votes alone decide who wins		
Ison's vote to eliminate	NJOY	Freja Modin	Frida Sandén	Manda Nilsénius	Alexander Holmgren	Manda Nilsénius	Alexander Holmgren	J.E.M	No judges' vote or final showdown: public votes alone decide who wins		
Carlsson's vote to eliminate	NJOY	Freja Modin	Frida Sandén	Hey Mary	Oscar Zia	J.E.M	Isak Danielson	Malcolm Brandin	No judges' vote or final showdown: public votes alone decide who wins		
Serneholt's vote to eliminate	Freja Modin	Freja Modin	Frida Sandén	Manda Nilsénius	Alexander Holmgren	Manda Nilsénius	Alexander Holmgren	Malcolm Brandin	No judges' vote or final showdown: public votes alone decide who wins		
Orup's Vote to eliminate	NJOY	Hey Mary	Frida Sandén	Hey Mary	Oscar Zia	J.E.M	Isak Danielson	Malcolm Brandin	No judges' vote or final showdown: public votes alone decide who wins		
Eliminated
Eliminated	**NJOY**; 3 of 4 votes Majority	**Freja Modin**; 3 of 4 votes Majority	**Frida Sandén**; 4 of 4 votes Majority	**No Elimination**	**Hey Mary**; Public Vote	**Manda Nilsénius**; 2 of 4 votes Deadlock	**Alexander Holmgren**; 2 of 4 votes Deadlock	**Malcolm Brandin**; 3 of 4 votes Majority	**J.E.M**; Bottom	**Isak Danielson**; Third Place	**Benny Hult**; Runner-Up
Eliminated	**NJOY**; 3 of 4 votes Majority	**Freja Modin**; 3 of 4 votes Majority	**Frida Sandén**; 4 of 4 votes Majority	**No Elimination**	**Oscar Zia**; 2 of 4 votes Deadlock	**Manda Nilsénius**; 2 of 4 votes Deadlock	**Alexander Holmgren**; 2 of 4 votes Deadlock	**Malcolm Brandin**; 3 of 4 votes Majority	**J.E.M**; Bottom	**Isak Danielson**; Third Place	**Awa Santesson-Sey**; Winner

=== Live show details ===
==== Week 1 (5 October) ====
Contestants' performances on the first live show
Act	Order	Song	Result
J.E.M	1	"Wild Ones"	Safe
Freja Modin	2	"Evighet"	Bottom two
Awa Santesson-Sey	3	"Call Me Maybe"	Safe
Isak Danielson	4	"Somebody That I Used to Know"	Safe
Frida Sandén	5	"Teenage Dream"	Safe
Benny Hult	6	"Wild Horses"	Safe
Malcolm Brandin	7	"Bredängsstil" (original song)	Safe
Hey Mary	8	"With Every Heartbeat"	Safe
Manda Nilsénius	9	"We Found Love"	Safe
Alexander Holmgren	10	"Marry You"	Safe
NJOY	11	"La La Love"	Bottom two
Oscar Zia	12	"Boyfriend"	Safe
Final showdown details
Freja Modin	1	"En dröm"	Safe
NJOY	2	"Free Your Mind"	Eliminated

Judges votes to eliminate

- Orup: NJOY
- Serneholt: Freja Modin
- Carlsson: NJOY
- Ison: NJOY

==== Week 2 (12 October) ====
- Musical guest: Loreen ("Crying Out Your Name")

Contestants' performances on the second live show
Act	Order	Song	Result
Benny Hult	1	"Crazy"	Safe
Oscar Zia	2	"DJ Got Us Fallin' in Love"	Safe
Frida Sandén	3	"Wherever You Will Go"	Safe
J.E.M	4	"Ghetto Supastar (That Is What You Are)"	Safe
Freja Modin	5	"Bara Himlen Ser På"	Bottom two
Isak Danielson	6	"Keep On Walking"	Safe
Awa Santesson-Sey	7	"Mercy"	Safe
Hey Mary	8	"I Love It"	Bottom two
Alexander Holmgren	9	"The Whole of the Moon"	Safe
Manda Nilsénius	10	"One Last Time"	Safe
Malcolm Brandin	11	"Galen" (original song)	Safe
Final showdown details
Freja Modin	1	"Genom Eld"	Eliminated
Hey Mary	2	"Emotion"	Safe

Judges votes to eliminate

- Orup: Hey Mary
- Serneholt: Freja Modin
- Carlsson: Freja Modin
- Ison: Freja Modin

==== Week 3 (19 October) ====
Contestants' performances on the third live show
Act	Order	Song	Result
Awa Santesson-Sey	1	"MMMBop"	Safe
Alexander Holmgren	2	"Turn Me On"	Safe
Hey Mary	3	"Nothing Compares 2 U"	Safe
Oscar Zia	4	"Danza Kuduro"	Safe
Benny Hult	5	"Mad World"	Safe
Manda Nilsénius	6	"It Feels So Good"	Bottom two
Malcolm Brandin	7	"Here Comes the Hotstepper"	Safe
Isak Danielson	8	"You're Beautiful"	Safe
Frida Sandén	9	"One of Us"	Bottom two
J.E.M	10	"Groove Is in the Heart"	Safe
Final showdown details
Manda Nilsénius	1	"Wide Awake"	Safe
Frida Sandén	2	"Skyscraper"	Eliminated

Judges votes to eliminate

- Ison: Frida Sandén
- Carlsson: Frida Sandén
- Serneholt: Frida Sandén
- Orup: Frida Sandén

==== Week 4 (26 October) ====
Contestants' performances on the fourth live show
Act	Order	Song	Result
Oscar Zia	1	"When You Say Nothing At All"	Safe
Benny Hult	2	"Bad Things"	Safe
Awa Santesson-Sey	3	"Love Story"	Safe
Hey Mary	4	"I Can't Help Myself (Sugar Pie Honey Bunch)"	Bottom two
Malcolm Brandin	5	"Malcolm B-thoven's femma" (original song)	Safe
Alexander Holmgren	6	"Tiny Dancer"	Safe
Manda Nilsénius	7	"Bad Romance"	Bottom two
Isak Danielson	8	"Skyfall"	Safe
J.E.M	9	"Give Me Everything"	Safe
Final showdown details
Hey Mary	1	"One Night Only"	Safe
Manda Nilsénius	2	"No One"	Eliminated

Judges votes to eliminate

- Ison: Manda Nilsénius
- Carlsson: Hey Mary
- Serneholt: Manda Nilsénius
- Orup: Hey Mary

Although Manda Nilsénius was eliminated, after checking the votes, it was revealed that Hey Mary had received the fewest votes in that week. Therefore, it was decided that both acts would continue to Week 5; to make up for this, two acts would be eliminated in Week 5.

==== Week 5 (2 November) ====
- Musical guest: One Direction ("Live While We're Young" & "What Makes You Beautiful")

Contestants' performances on the fifth live show
Act	Order	Song	Result
Isak Danielson	1	"Dancing on My Own"/"Från och med Du"	Safe
Benny Hult	2	"Don't You Worry Child"	Safe
Hey Mary	3	"Eternal Flame"	Eliminated
Awa Santesson-Sey	4	"Upside Down"	Safe
Malcolm Brandin	5	"Fest på röda linjen" (original song)	Safe
Manda Nilsénius	6	"If I Were a Boy"	Safe
Alexander Holmgren	7	"Lemon Tree"	Bottom two
Oscar Zia	8	"Moves Like Jagger"	Bottom two
J.E.M	9	"On the Floor"	Safe
Final showdown details
Alexander Holmgren	1	"All Right Now"	Safe
Oscar Zia	2	"It Will Rain"	Eliminated

Judges votes to eliminate

- Orup: Oscar Zia
- Serneholt: Alexander Holmgren
- Carlsson: Oscar Zia
- Ison: Alexander Holmgren

==== Week 6 (9 November) ====
- Musical guest: Danny Saucedo ("Delirious")

Contestants' performances on the sixth live show
Act	Order	Song	Result
J.E.M	1	"Me and My Drum"	Bottom two
Awa Santesson-Sey	2	"Måndagsbarn"	Safe
Benny Hult	3	"Longing for Lullabies"	Safe
Malcolm Brandin	4	"Tar det tillbaka"	Safe
Alexander Holmgren	5	"Happyland"	Safe
Manda Nilsénius	6	"Listen to Your Heart"	Bottom two
Isak Danielson	7	"Silhouettes"	Safe
Final showdown details
J.E.M	1	"Nothin' on You"	Safe
Manda Nilsénius	2	"Oops!... I Did It Again"	Eliminated

Judges votes to eliminate

- Orup: J.E.M
- Serneholt: Manda Nilsénius
- Carlsson: J.E.M
- Ison: Manda Nilsénius

==== Week 7 (16 November) ====
- Musical guest: Olly Murs ("Heart Skips a Beat" & "Troublemaker")

Contestants' performances on the seventh live show
Act	Order	Song	Result
Isak Danielson	1	"Feeling Good"	Bottom two
Alexander Holmgren	2	"Smells Like Teen Spirit"	Bottom two
J.E.M	3	"Turn Your Lights Down Low"	Safe
Malcolm Brandin	4	"Jag saknar dig" (original song)	Safe
Awa Santesson-Sey	5	"Blame It on the Boogie"	Safe
Benny Hult	6	"What's Going On"	Safe
Final showdown details
Isak Danielson	1	"I Was Here"	Safe
Alexander Holmgren	2	"Signed, Sealed, Delivered I'm Yours"	Eliminated

Judges votes to eliminate

- Ison: Alexander Holmgren
- Carlsson: Isak Danielson
- Serneholt: Alexander Holmgren
- Orup: Isak Danielson

==== Week 8 (23 November) ====
Contestants' performances on the eighth live show
Act	Order	First song	Order	Second song	Result
J.E.M	1	"I Gotta Feeling"	6	"Starships"	Bottom two
Isak Danielson	2	"Ordinary People"	7	"9 to 5"	Safe
Awa Santesson-Sey	3	"You Keep Me Hangin' On"	8	"Crazy in Love"	Safe
Benny Hult	4	"If You Don't Know Me by Now"	9	"Bed of Roses"	Safe
Malcolm Brandin	5	"Best I Ever Had" (Swedish)	10	"Everything Is Everything"	Bottom two
Final showdown details
J.E.M	1	"Airplanes"			Safe
Malcolm Brandin	2	Original song			Eliminated

Judges' votes to eliminate

- Ison: J.E.M
- Carlsson: Malcolm Brandin
- Serneholt: Malcolm Brandin
- Orup: Malcolm Brandin

==== Week 9: Semi-Final (30 November) ====
Contestants' performances on the ninth live show
Act	Order	First song	Order	Second song	Result
J.E.M	1	"Wild Ones"	5	"Alone Again"	Bottom two
Isak Danielson	2	"Skyfall"	6	"Viva la Vida"	Bottom two
Benny Hult	3	"Don't You Worry Child"	7	"Halo"	Safe
Awa Santesson-Sey	4	"Mercy"	8	"Jump (For My Love)"	Safe
Final showdown details
J.E.M	1	"Written in the Stars"			Eliminated
Isak Danielson	2	Read All About It, Pt. III			Safe

Public votes alone decided who would advance to the final.

==== Week 10: Final (7 December) ====
Contestants' performances on the tenth live show
Act	Order	Song	Order	Duet	Order	Song	Result
Awa Santesson-Sey	1	"Independent Women"	4	"My Heart Is Refusing Me" (with Loreen)	7	"You Can't Hurry Love"	Winner
Isak Danielson	2	"Titanium"	5	"Life is a Rollercoaster" (with Ronan Keating)	N/A	N/A (Already eliminated)	Eliminated
Benny Hult	3	"Ain't No Mountain High Enough"	6	"Hungry Heart" (with Orup)	8	"More Than You'll Ever Know"	Runner-up

== Xtra Factor ==
Xtra Factor was an after show which was broadcast after every week's live show and results. It was hosted in season one by Sara Lumholdt and Martin Björk.

== Errors ==
In Week 4, David Hellenius incorrectly announced that Manda Nilsénius had received fewer public votes than Hey Mary from deadlock and had to leave the competition. But after checking the votes, it was revealed that Hey Mary had received the fewest votes in that week. Therefore, it was decided that both acts would continue to Week 5; to make up for this, two acts would be eliminated in Week 5.
