= Shiragirl =

American punk rock band from California

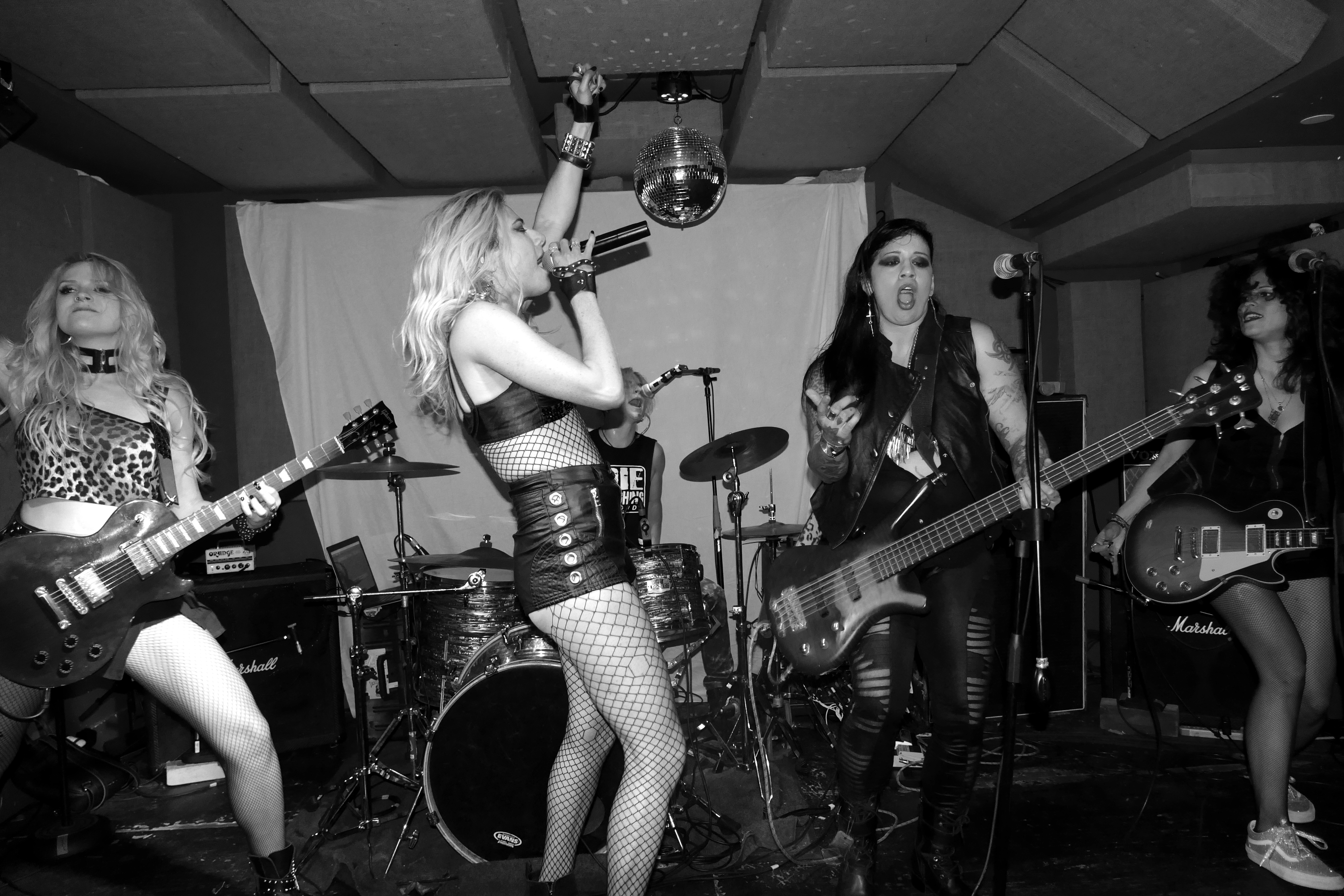
- Shiragirl performing in 2019

Background information
- Origin: California, U.S.
- Genres: Punk rock
- Years active: 2003–present
- Members: Shira Yevin; Raine Palladino; Constance Antoinette Day; Alex Nicole Windsor
- Past members: Leanne Bowes; Moa Munoz
- Website: shiragirl.com

Shiragirl is an American punk rock band from Southern California. The band currently consists of Shira Yevin, Raine Palladino, Constance Antoinette Day, and Alex Nicole Windsor. Shiragirl is best known for founding the Shiragirl Stage on the Vans Warped Tour showcasing underground, female-fronted bands.

== History ==
In 2003, Shira Yevin played the Girlz Garage Tour to spin off Vans Warped Tour appearing under the stage name Shiragirl.

In 2004, Shiragirl recorded their first song "Go, Go, Go" with the producer Tim Armstrong of Rancid. The song ended being released on Shiragirls EP Not Sold in Stores that was finished with the producer Johny London.

The same year in Fullerton, California, Shiragirl crashed Vans Warped Tour and created the makeshift Shiragirl Stage. Shiragirl, DJ Lava, and former bandmates, bought bubblegum pink color paint along with electric saws that transformed a $12,000 box truck into a mobile venue that would crank down into a 15-foot elevated wooden stage. Shiragirl was then invited by the Kevin Lyman, Vans Warped Tour founder, to finish the rest of Warped Tour as one of the acts on the festival lineup. Shiragirl was also responsible in recruiting female acts to perform at the festival. While on tour, on the last day Shiragirl performed "Bad Reputation" with Joan Jett.

In 2010, Shiragirl released the sing Scream! Spit! Sing! where they collaborated with Lil Wayne.

== Shiragirl Stage ==
The band is known for efforts supporting female artists in the male-dominated music industry by founding the Shiragirl Stage at Vans Warped Tour. The "pink-and-black" stage allowed at least 300 female-fronted underground bands to perform at the festival. Some of the many acts included Joan Jett, Katy Perry, The Dollyrots, Blameshift, Paramore, and more.

== Members ==
Current members

- Shira Yevin – lead vocals (2003–present)
- Constance Antoinette Day – guitar, backing vocals (present)
- Alex Nicole Windsor – bass, backing vocals (present)
- Raine Palladino – drums, production (2005–present)

Former members

- Leanne Bowes – bass (2018)
- Moa Munoz - guitar (2018)

== Recognition ==
=== MTV 2005 "Warpie Award" ===
Shiragirl earned the MTV's 2005 "Warpie Award" for crashing the tour and following the tour in their RV without paying a fee to play as the other bands. This is considered the most punk-rock move to get invited into the Vans Warped Tour Family.

== Discography ==
=== Singles ===
- "Antisocial Media" (2021)
- "Nothin to Lose" (2019)
- "Girls Just Wanna Get Sum (Remix)" (2018)
- "Summers Comin" (2018)
- "Get 'em Hot" (2018)
- "Resist" (2017)
- "All Night Long" (2017)
- "Stomp It Out" (2010)

=== Albums ===
- Scream! Spit! Sing! (2010)
- Not Sold In Stores (2005)

=== EPs ===
- Andi Underground (2019)
- Brooklyn Goes Hollywood (2018)
