= We Found Love =

2011 single by Rihanna feat. Calvin Harris

Single by Rihanna featuring Calvin Harris

from the album Talk That Talk
- Released: September 22, 2011
- Recorded: 2011
- Studio: Fly Eye Studios, London; Westlake Recording Studios, Los Angeles
- Genre: EDM
- Length: 3:35
- Label: Def Jam; SRP
- Songwriter: Adam Wiles
- Producers: Kuk Harrell; Calvin Harris

Rihanna singles chronology
"Fly" (2011)	"We Found Love" (2011)	"You da One" (2011)

Calvin Harris singles chronology
"Feel So Close" (2011)	"We Found Love" (2011)	"Off the Record" (2011)

Music video
- "We Found Love" on YouTube

"We Found Love" is a song by the Barbadian singer Rihanna featuring Scottish DJ Calvin Harris. It was released as the lead single from Rihanna's sixth album, Talk That Talk (2011), and was later included on Harris' 2012 album 18 Months. Produced and written by Harris, "We Found Love" premiered on September 22, 2011, and received polarized reviews from music critics upon release. "We Found Love" is an uptempo EDM song, with elements of electro house, dance-pop, techno, trance, Eurodance, Euro disco and Europop. Its lyrics speak of a couple who "found love in a hopeless place".

The song was a major worldwide success. It topped the US Billboard Hot 100 for ten non-consecutive weeks, becoming the longest running number-one single of 2011. The single also surpassed "Umbrella" and became Rihanna's longest running number one single. It was the singer's eleventh song to top the Hot 100, putting her in third place among female recording artists amassing the most number one singles. Outside of the United States, "We Found Love" topped the charts in 25 other countries, including Canada, New Zealand, France, Germany, the Republic of Ireland, Russia, Scotland, Switzerland, and the United Kingdom. According to Billboard it is the 29th most successful single of all time in the US. As of 2015, the single has sold 10.5 million copies worldwide, thus being one of the best selling singles of all time.

The song's accompanying music video, directed by Melina Matsoukas, depicts the singer as a drug-abusing thrill-seeker in a relationship that quickly spirals downward into addiction and domestic violence. The video won a Grammy Award for Best Music Video at the 55th Annual Grammy Awards and MTV Video Music Award for Video of the Year at the 2012 MTV Video Music Awards. The song has been performed on both the British and American versions of The X Factor, as well as at the 54th Annual Grammy Awards and the 2012 Brit Awards. Multiple recording artists have covered "We Found Love" including British artists Coldplay and Jessie J.

== Background ==
"It changed absolutely everything. Career-wise it was the best thing that could ever have happened. For example, in America my tune 'Feel So Close' came out about three months before. But when 'We Found Love' came out, the radio started playing 'Feel So Close' like it was the single after. Then that did really well, it charted well and sold a lot of copies.

— Harris talking about the success of "We Found Love"

Following the release and success of her album Loud (2010), Rihanna originally revealed via Twitter that the album would be re-issued with new songs and released in Fall 2011, writing that "[t]he [Loud era] continues with more new music to add to [your] collection". In September 2011, Rihanna again took to the social networking site to confirm that the plans had been scrapped, with the singer tweeting "I [thought about] a [re-release], but LOUD is its own body of work! Plus [you] guys work so hard that [you] deserve to act brand new". On September 19, 2011, Rihanna further provoked excitement amongst her followers when she posted that she was listening to the song, only to be re-tweeted by Calvin Harris, who replied "Sometimes it feels like we find love in the most hopeless place", suggesting that his response contained possible lyrics from the song. In an interview with Capital FM, Harris – who produced the track – explained that followers of Rihanna had sent messages to him regarding their expectations of the song, saying "The song better not be rubbish", which he interpreted as slightly threatening, but went on to say that "it's all part of the fun". In an interview for Q magazine, Harris said of the lyric, "we found love in a hopeless place," "It could have been Jumpin Jaks in Dumfries (Harris' home town), I don't know exactly what I was thinking about."

"We Found Love" premiered in the United Kingdom on September 22, 2011, on Capital FM, and was sent for mainstream adds in the United States on October 11, 2011. The song was released via iTunes on September 22, 2011. During an interview with MTV News, Calvin Harris revealed, "'We Found Love,' is the most successful thing I've done ever... It's not strictly a song by me, obviously, it's by Rihanna. She sings it...It was great to work with her... No one could have taken it as far as she did. You can't escape it here [in America]. I've heard it a lot. I've heard it probably more times today than I did when I was mixing it. Which is a good thing... Ever since the Rihanna song did well, a lot of people want to do some stuff, which is great... That's what I enjoy doing. In terms of actual names, I've not done anything yet." In October 2012, British singer Leona Lewis claimed that she was originally chosen to sing the song but ended up losing it to Rihanna when Harris went touring with the latter, commenting. "I didn’t commit to it because I wanted "Trouble" to be my first single so I think that was another reason they went with Rihanna. It was the same version and production but mine’s better." In 2013, Nicole Scherzinger claimed that she was the first artist given the song but ended up rejecting it, commenting. "I've got the demo of that song and I was busy at the time. They'd sent me a few dance tracks and I wasn't able to get to them and I was like, 'Oh there's so much dance and I want to take a break from it."

=== Artwork ===
The artwork for "We Found Love" was released by Rihanna's official Facebook page on September 22, 2011. Grady Smith of Entertainment Weekly's The Music Mix criticized the song's artwork, writing "'We found love in a hopeless place,' Rihanna repeats over a David Guetta-ish synth beat. But judging by the single cover, her place doesn't look too hopeless, does it? Maybe there's a building on fire outside the frame, and that fire hydrant doesn't work. I guess that would be hopeless." A reviewer for Sugar Magazine wrote that "On anyone else this would be a pretty odd look but Rihanna somehow makes a denim overload look good." A reviewer for Neon Limelight commented that Rihanna appeared to be adopting a tomboy image for the new project, writing, "She really is going for that sexy tomboy look this album era it seems; remember the laid back look she rocked on the single's cover art?".

== Composition ==
"We Found Love" is an EDM and electro-R&B song, with elements of electro house, Europop, Eurodance, techno, dance-pop, trance, and Euro disco. According to the digital music sheet published at musicnotes.com, the song is written in the key of G flat major and it is set at a tempo of 128 beats per minute. The instrumentation of "We Found Love" consists of alarm bells, a keyboard, repetitive pumped-up synthesizers and 4/4 beats.

Rihanna's vocal range in the song spans one octave, from the lower note of C♯_{4} to the higher note of C♯_{5}. Priya Elan of NME commented that Rihanna sounds "extremely relaxed" and Bill Lamb of About.com wrote that her vocals are simple and unaffected. Leah Collins of The Vancouver Sun wrote that Rihanna's vocals on "We Found Love" were similar to her vocals on "Fly". According to Elan, the keyboard work in the song bears resemblance to that in from "Only Girl (In the World)" and the melody is similar to that of "Complicated", a track included in Rihanna's 2010 studio album Loud. Similarly, Michael Cragg of The Guardian noted that "We Found Love" is in the same vein as "Only Girl (In the World)", with regard to its dance beat.

The lyrical content of the song is sparse and largely revolves around Rihanna chanting the song's hook line, "We found love in a hopeless place". Jody Rosen of Rolling Stone described it as "half-baked romantic". Rihanna starts the song in a falsetto airy voice as she sings, "Yellow diamonds in the light / And we’re standing side by side / As your shadow crosses mine / What it takes to come alive." Michael Cragg commented that the first chorus is almost being sidelined in favor of a large chunk of Harris's riff, before they join on the second chorus. The hook repeatedly rings throughout the song.

== Critical reception ==
The song received polarized reviews from music critics. Amanda Dobbins of Vulture praised the composition of the song, writing "Harris's electro fingerprints are all over this one — it plays like a straight house track, with some dreamy Rihanna vocals added in over the beat." A reviewer for Instinct magazine praised the song, writing that "We Found Love" does not mark a departure from the dance-floor oriented material Rihanna debuted on Loud, but it certainly boasts "a higher-energy, peak-hour vibe". Similarly, Michael Cragg of The Guardian commented that the song takes the dance direction Rihanna hinted at on "Only Girl (In the World)" and continues releasing similar songs, making reference to "We Found Love". Cragg also likened the song to Leona Lewis's recent single, "Collide", but criticized the song's structure, writing "[it] is slightly odd". He ended his review writing, "Either way, she could have recited Nick Clegg's conference speech from Wednesday over the sound of Harris cracking his knuckles and it would be a hit."

Priya Elan of NME commented, "By now it's pretty customary to have a jaw-on-the-floor reaction to the first single from a Rihanna album. 'Pon De Replay', 'SOS', 'Umbrella', 'Russian Roulette', 'Only Girl In The World'." Despite complimenting Rihanna for sounding extremely relaxed and calling her vocal as "luxurious calling to mind the atmosphere", Elan concluded that the over-all effect is underwhelming. She continued by writing that instead of re-inventing the pop wheel, "We Found Love" has "a whiff of treading-water about it" and that "if there is a 'goosebump' moment to be had it comes after many multiple plays and, dare we say it, a glass of something strong." Awarding "We Found Love" two stars out of five, Jody Rosen of Rolling Stone was critical, writing that it "is much ado about very little indeed" and that is "an insipid tune". He concluded that Rihanna repeats 'We found love in a hopeless place' "approximately 350 times, hoping it will start to mean something. It's the worst single of Rihanna’s career. It will probably top the Hot 100 anyway." Leah Collins of The Vancouver Sun initially praised Rihanna's vocal performance in the song, writing that she "smoothes out her vocals", before adding, "Angelic as she sounds, though, [her] performance – which is mostly just her repeating the line 'We found love in a hopeless place' – seems to take second place to Harris' repetitive synth-based blare." Similarly, Amos Barshad of Grantland criticized the singer's vocal performance, calling it "a complete afterthought" before concluding, "People who regularly attend the Electric Zoo festival: Rihanna wants your money!"

A reviewer for GlobalGrind commented on the song's lyrics, suggesting that there is perhaps an underlying message in the song for ex-boyfriend Chris Brown, in the line "We found love in a hopeless place". This further raised suspicion when Brown re-tweeted one of Rihanna's posts on Twitter, which read "Sometimes it feels like we find love in the most hopeless place". Jessica Herndon of People magazine praised the song, saying that "'We Found Love' had an amazing influence on people all across the world in 2012, becoming one of the most popular and most successful songs".

Pitchfork Media commented, "Over a frantic, Calvin Harris-produced, Guetta-meets-'Sandstorm' beat on her sixth record's lead-off single, Rihanna repeats these words almost 20 times. 'We Found Love' ranks among Ri's best singles because it recognizes that there's not much more that needs to be said: in three and a half minutes, the line moves from being a great pop lyric to a triumphant mantra to something suggestive of a whole spectrum of unspoken emotion. The best pop music transports you to somewhere beyond words, and Rihanna's strongest singles all seem to be in on this secret." AllMusic chose the song as a highlight on Talk That Talk, and wrote about the "singer's ecstatic vocal than Calvin Harris' shrill, plinky production". Los Angeles Times commented that the song was an "ode for bad love" and added it "wouldn't be out of place at Electric Daisy Carnival". The New York Times' writer commented "'We Found Love' almost criminally recalls the swinging Crystal Waters singles, with triumphant percussion somewhere between church and seventh-inning stretch." Billboard magazine also praised the song, saying that: "Through a haze of glitter and bliss, Rihanna emerges to let us find a gorgeous hook in a hopeless place, and Calvin Harris becomes a household name." As of January 2015, Billboard named "We Found Love" as the best song of the 2010s (so far). USA Today considered the song to be a highlight on the set, commenting that Rihanna sings "bistfully". Entertainment Weekly noted, "U.K. club king Calvin Harris trades Rihanna's usual somber synths for disco ecstasy on 'We Found Love,' a song that builds and builds to a climax that's so arena-ready it practically begs for someone to blow a vuvuzela".

Retrospective reviews praise "We Found Love" as a "classic rave song" or as "EDM's definitive anthem." Stereogum said in 2023 that the song still evokes the joyous "whoop" at parties, filling the dance floor when it plays.

== Recognition and awards ==
MTV chose "We Found Love" as the third best song of 2011, and "Video of the Year" at the MTV Video Music Awards 2012. The writers of the website further commented, "The leadoff single from Talk That Talk is where Rihanna fully embraced EDM. Produced by Calvin Harris, 'We Found Love' is a swirling party track about love and loss, the rare song that manages to be sad and joyous all at once. And it is a pinnacle of the pop/dance crossover, a throwback to '90s raves that could make even the most stoic lover of pop want to break out a glow stick and just dance. Rob Sheffield of Rolling Stone put "We Found Love" at number 11 on his list of Top 25 Songs of 2011 commenting, "While her other hits tried to camouflage her spindly voice, here it just strains for that spindly melody." It was named the third biggest love song of all time by Billboard.

Year	Ceremony	Award	Result
2012	Billboard Music Awards	Top Radio Song	Nominated
2012	International Dance Music Awards	Best R&B/Urban Dance Track	Won
2012	International Dance Music Awards	Best Music Video	Nominated
2012	International Dance Music Awards	Best Commercial/Pop Dance Track	Won
2012	MTV Video Music Awards	Video Of The Year	Won
2012	MTV Video Music Awards	Best Female Video	Nominated
2012	MTV Video Music Awards	Best Pop Video	Nominated
2012	MTV Europe Music Awards	Best Video	Nominated
2012	MTV Europe Music Awards	Best Song	Nominated
2012	MTV Video Music Awards Japan	Best Female Video	Nominated
2012	MTV Video Music Awards Japan	Best Pop Video	Nominated
2012	MuchMusic Video Awards	International Video of the Year	Nominated
2012	MuchMusic Video Awards	UR Fave International Artist	Nominated
2012	NRJ Music Awards	Best International Song	Nominated
2012	UK Music Video Awards	Best Pop Video - International	Nominated
2013	55th Grammy Awards	Best Short Form Music Video	Won

=== Critic lists ===
Critic lists
Publisher	Year	Listicle	Rank	Ref.
Billboard	2015	The 20 Best Songs of the 2010s So Far	1	
Billboard	2019	100 Songs That Defined the Decade	No order	
GQ	2019	The 24 Songs That Shaped the Decade	No order	
The Guardian	2011	The best songs of 2011	9	
NME	2011	Best Tracks of 2011	26	
NME	2019	Greatest Songs of the Decade: 2010s	71	
Pitchfork	2011	The Top 100 Tracks of 2011	67	
Pitchfork	2019	The 200 Best Songs of the 2010s	62	
Rolling Stone	2018	100 Greatest Songs of the Century So Far	65	
Rolling Stone	2019	The 100 Best Songs of the 2010s	30	
Rolling Stone Spain	2013	The 50 Best Songs of the 21st Century	17	
Slant Magazine	2020	The 100 Best Songs of the 2010s	5	
Stereogum	2019	The 200 Best Songs of the 2010s	5	
Vice	2017	101 Best EDM Songs of All Time	17	

== Chart performance ==
=== Oceania ===
"We Found Love" made its chart debut on the New Zealand Singles Chart on September 26, 2011, at number 14, and in its fifth week, rose to number 1. It remained at the top for nine straight weeks, becoming Rihanna's longest-running single in the country, overtaking 'Umbrella' which reigned for six weeks in 2007. The song has since been certified three-times platinum by the RIANZ, denoting shipments of 45,000 copies. In Australia, "We Found Love" debuted on the Australian Singles Chart on October 9, 2011, at number 3, before rising to number 2 for multiple weeks. As of February 2013, the song has been certified six-times platinum by the Australian Recording Industry Association, denoting shipments of 420,000 copies, marking Rihanna's best-selling single in the country as a lead artist.

=== North America ===
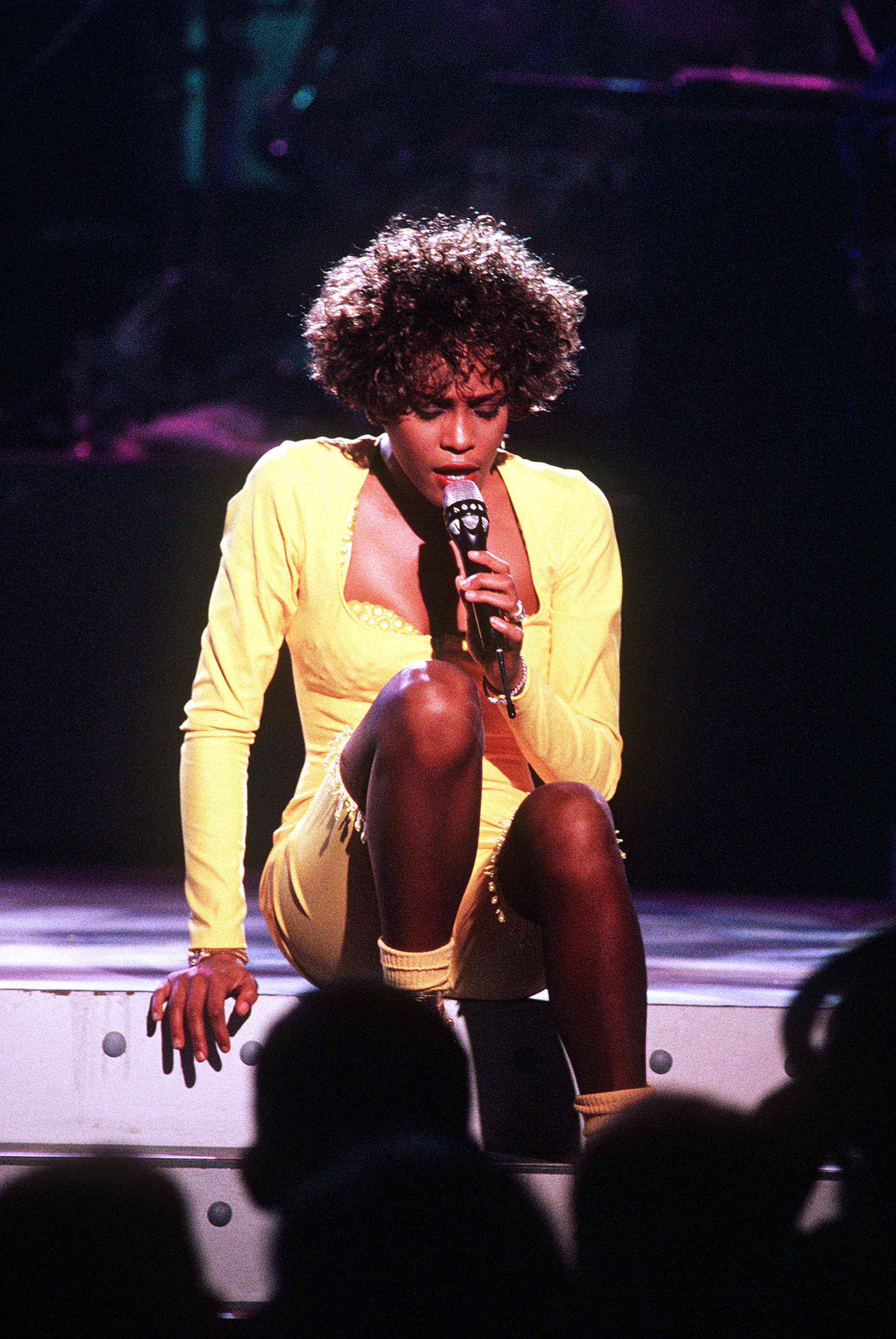
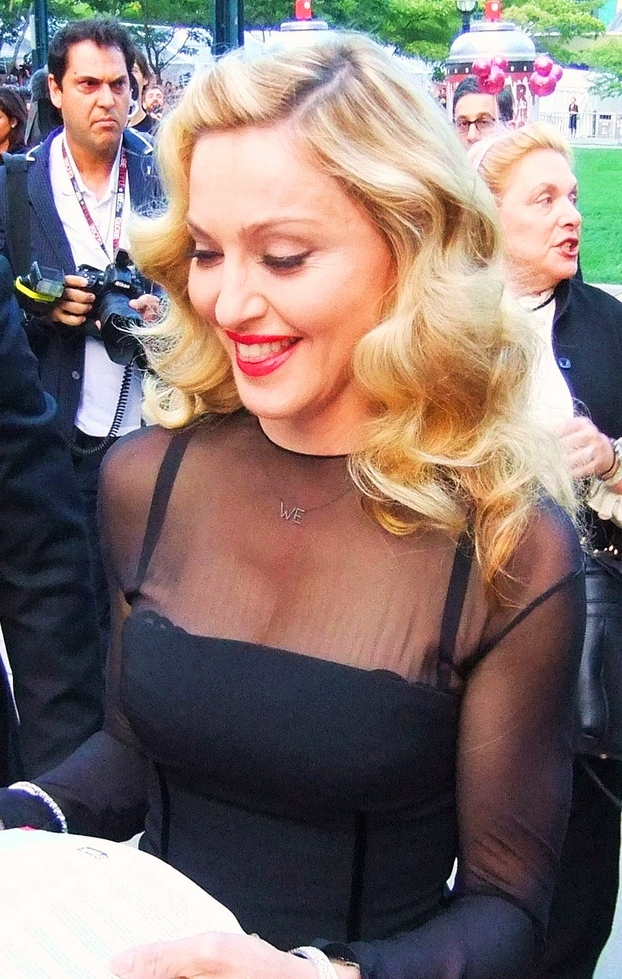
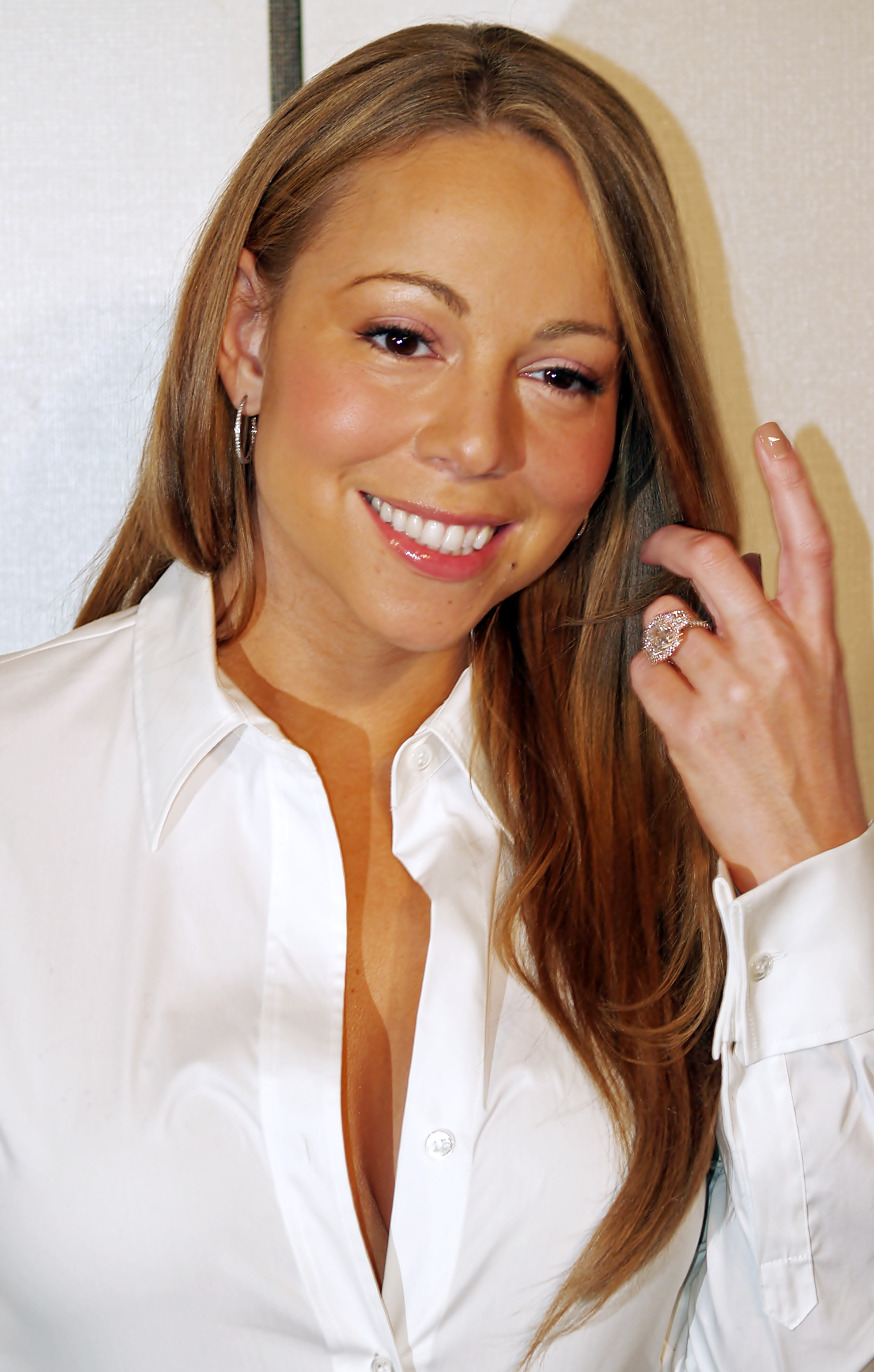
With "We Found Love" becoming Rihanna's eleventh number 1 single on the US Billboard Hot 100 chart, the singer was tied with Whitney Houston in third place amongst females with the most number 1 singles on the chart, behind Madonna (12) and Mariah Carey (18 at the time).

In the United States, the song debuted on the Billboard Hot 100 chart on September 28, 2011, at number 16. "We Found Love" became the singer's fourth highest debut on the chart out of her 31 Hot 100 chart entries, with the highest being her collaboration with Eminem, "Love the Way You Lie", which debuted at number 2 in July 2010. The following week, "We Found Love" rose to number 9, giving Rihanna the record for a solo artist to have amassed twenty top-ten singles in the history of the Billboard Hot 100 chart in the shortest amount of time. Rihanna achieved the feat in a time span of six years and four months, surpassing the record previously held by Madonna who managed the achievement in a time span of six years and nine months. In its sixth week on the chart, the song reached number 1, giving Rihanna her eleventh number 1 single and Calvin Harris his first number 1 single in the United States and making him the first British dance DJ to top the Billboard Hot 100 and the first Scottish solo act to top the chart since Lulu's "To Sir with Love" in 1967. Rihanna also then tied the record with Whitney Houston in fifth place for the highest number of chart-topping singles in the fifty-three-year history of the chart, behind the Beatles (20), Mariah Carey (19), Michael Jackson (13), and a fourth place tie between Madonna and the Supremes (both with 12). Rihanna also then tied the record with Houston as the female artists with the third most number 1 singles on the chart, behind Carey and Madonna. "We Found Love" spent ten non-consecutive weeks at the top of the Billboard Hot 100, surpassing "Umbrella" as Rihanna's longest number 1 single in the country, and was the longest-running number 1 of 2011. It was certified nine times platinum by the Recording Industry Association of America (RIAA) for shipping more than 9 million copies. As of June 2015, the song has sold 5.4 million digital copies in the US. On August 1, 2013, Billboard announced that "We Found Love" is the 24th biggest Hot 100 hit of all time in the chart's 55-year history.

"We Found Love" debuted at number 7 on the US Hot Digital Songs chart, with digital download sales of 117,000 after only four days according to Nielsen SoundScan. In its fifth week, the song rose to number 1, with sales of 231,000 copies, giving Rihanna her eleventh number 1 song on the chart. The song spent a second week at number 1 on the chart, with sales of 243,000 copies, bringing total sales to 1,057,000 copies sold, marking Rihanna's twentieth download to reach the million-selling milestone, extending her record for the most such downloads among women. On October 12, 2011, the song debuted at number 39 on the US Hot Dance Club Songs chart and number 21 on the Pop Songs chart. It eventually reached number 1 on both charts. It was, until 2013, the most recent song to spend at least two consecutive weeks atop the US Hot Dance Club chart, until Daft Punk's "Get Lucky". "We Found Love" also peaked at numbers 3 and 2 on the US Latin Songs and Latin Pop Songs charts, becoming Rihanna's highest-charting single on both charts. Furthermore, the song reached the top spot on the Canadian Hot 100 chart.

=== Europe ===
In Harris's native United Kingdom, "We Found Love" debuted at the top of the UK Singles Chart, UK Dance Chart and UK Singles Download Chart on October 9, 2011 – for the week ending date October 15, 2011 – with 87,000 copies sold, despite only having been on sale for four days. With "We Found Love" debuting at the top of the UK Singles Chart, Rihanna set a record by becoming the first female solo artist to top the chart six times in five consecutive years, having previously held pole position with "Umbrella", "Take a Bow", "Run This Town", "Only Girl (In the World)" and "What's My Name" between 2007 and 2011. It was also Rihanna's sixth and Harris' third number 1 in the UK. The song retained its top position on all three charts for three consecutive weeks, selling 92,000 copies in its third week. Total sales for "We Found Love" in the United Kingdom stood at 372,268 after just 24 days. In its fifth week, the song fell a place to number 2 but then in its sixth week, the song returned to number 1 for a fourth non-consecutive week and eventually topped the chart for six weeks, resulting in Rihanna overtaking Adele as the artist with the most cumulative weeks at number 1 in 2011 for a solo female artist, with a total of seven weeks between "We Found Love" and her January release "What's My Name?". In addition, in its sixth week at number 1, Rihanna scored her second "chart double" of the year when Talk That Talk and "We Found Love" placed at number 1 on the albums and singles charts, respectively. This achievement had not been achieved since 1979 and made Rihanna the first female artist in chart history to score two "chart doubles" in the same year, with the singer's previous album Loud and its second single, 'What's My Name?' topping both charts earlier in 2011. By February 2012, the single had racked up 1,006,460 copies in nineteen weeks, making it Rihanna's second solo track (third overall) to reach the million sales plateau since October 2011, following "Love the Way You Lie" and "Only Girl (In the World)". In November 2012, it was included on 'The Million Sellers' list by the Official Charts Company, consisting of the best-selling singles in the UK that have sold at least one million copies since 1952. It charted at number 76 out of a total 123, having sold 1.13 million copies. As of February 2016, the song has sold 1.39 million copies in the UK, making it Rihanna's biggest-selling single there. "We Found Love" is the 9th best-selling song of all time by a female artist in Britain.

Elsewhere in Europe, the song topped the charts in Denmark, Finland, France, Germany, Hungary, Ireland, Norway, Poland, Russia, Slovakia, Sweden and Switzerland and attained top-five positions in the Flanders and Wallonia regions of Belgium at numbers 3 and 2, and reached number 2 in the Czech Republic and Spain and three in the Netherlands. In Germany "We Found Love" entered the single chart at number 1 on October 28, 2011, becoming Rihanna's fourth number 1 in the country. After being deposed for a week, the track rebounded to take the lead spending three further weeks at the top, becoming Rihanna's second longest-running number 1 hit in the country after "Umbrella" in 2007. The song topped certain European charts for lengthy periods, including in Norway for nine non-consecutive weeks, Ireland for seven consecutive weeks and Denmark for six weeks.

== Music video ==
=== Background ===
The music video for "We Found Love" was shot in Northern Ireland in late September 2011, in County Down, Northern Ireland and the New Lodge area of North Belfast. The video was directed by Melina Matsoukas, who had previously directed the videos for "Hard" (2009), "Rude Boy" (2010), "Rockstar 101" (2010) and the controversial "S&M" (2011). Anticipation for the video grew in the United Kingdom when the national news picked up on the story of sixty-one-year-old Northern Ireland farmer Alan Graham withdrawing his permission to film in his barley field in Bangor, County Down after taking issue with Rihanna's clothing, focusing on her appearing topless and also wearing a red bikini top which he thought was an "inappropriate state of undress". Rihanna and her film crew departed amiably after Graham advised them to "be acquainted with God and to consider His Son, the Lord Jesus Christ, and His death and Resurrection."

=== Synopsis ===
The video begins with a monologue about love and heartbreak by an unseen narrator, fashion model Agyness Deyn. Multiple scenes of Rihanna and boxer Dudley O'Shaughnessy are intercut throughout the narration, depicting them in different love and hate situations with each other. The two are shown as completely enamored with each other while engaging in fun activities together, including enjoying their time at an indoor skating centre and eating in fast food restaurants. During the chorus, the video shows the romance to be somewhat warped, as images of drugs, various pills and dilated pupils are shown, while brief scenes of Rihanna and her boyfriend preparing to engage in sexual intercourse and their various stages of undress are shown. The chorus continues and the video abruptly cuts to Rihanna and other people at an outdoor rave, dancing to music. Calvin Harris features as the DJ during this scene.

From the second verse, Rihanna and her boyfriend are seen happily running amok in a supermarket, pushing each other in a shopping cart and spraying canned drinks at each other. This scene is interrupted with Rihanna in a Pontiac Trans Am outside with her boyfriend who begins to recklessly drive in circles, resulting in Rihanna asking him to stop the car which ensues into an argument between the pair. The video then progressively shows the couple experiencing mounting difficulties in their relationship. Rihanna removes herself from the car and returns moments later where we see her boyfriend grab her chin to look at him, suggesting that he is domestically violent towards her. During the final chorus Rihanna can be seen vomiting what appears to be pink and white streamers; she is also seen passed out on the street while her boyfriend tries to revive her. In another scene, Rihanna is seen lying on a couch while her boyfriend tattoos the word 'MINE' on her backside. Eventually, Rihanna decides to leave her boyfriend after finding him passed out on the floor of his apartment – and most likely due to the previous events shown throughout the video. The clip ends with Rihanna curled up in the corner of a room, crying.

=== Controversy and reception ===
The video generated controversy for its depiction of violence and drug use, as well as for Rihanna's removal of her clothes during filming. One journalist wrote, "The song is probably one of the most talked about in the country following the Barbadian being told to 'find God' after running naked through a Northern Irish farmer's field.". In France, the music video is banned from broadcasting during the day and was broadcast after 10:00 p.m. by the French audiovisual regulation with a warning (Not advised to kids under 10 years old) or (Not advised to kids under 12 years old) due to many so-called self-destructive, violent, suggestive scenes and of use of drugs and alcohol. It was described as a "disgrace" by an anti-rape campaigner, and Christian commenters worried about the effects of the video and that "Rihanna is damaging the moral and self-worth of young impressionable teens." However, The Guardian praised the video for being different in its time period and called it "a very British music video", comparing it to UK TV series, Skins. The video won a Grammy Award for 'Best Short-Form Music Video. As of January 2015, Billboard named the video as the second best music video of the 2010s (so far).

== Live performances ==
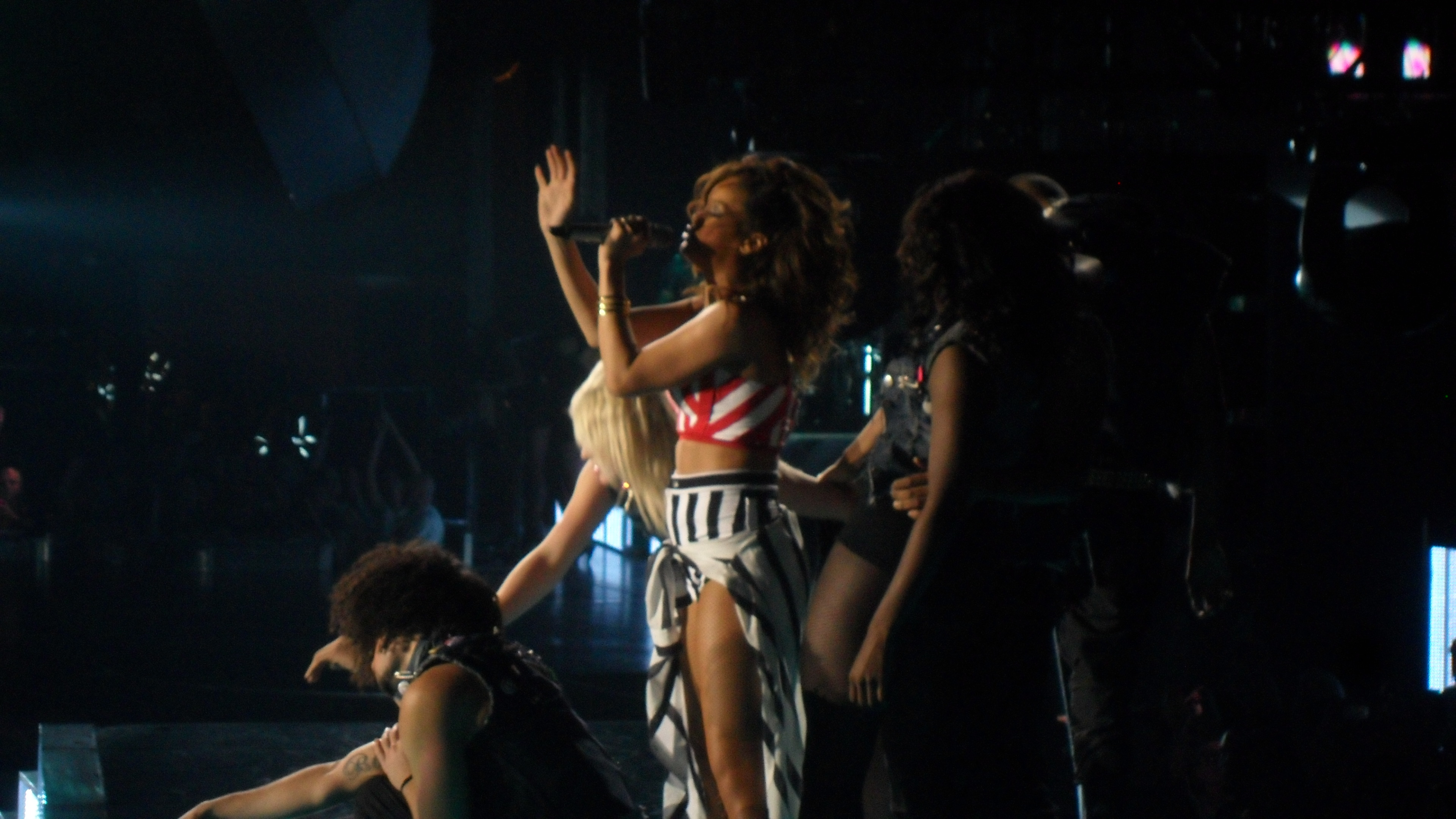
Rihanna performing "We Found Love" on the Loud Tour (2011)

Rihanna performed "We Found Love" for the first time on November 14, 2011, during a concert of her Loud Tour in London. The song was then added to the setlist as the closing song for the rest of the tour until it ended on December 22. On November 17, 2011, Rihanna performed the song on first season of The X Factor USA. The performance featured Rihanna wearing torn jeans and a bomber jacket with neon signs also present on the stage. On November 20, 2011, Rihanna performed the song on the eighth season of The X Factor UK, featuring Rihanna wearing a small tartan dress.

On February 12, 2012, Rihanna performed "We Found Love" at the 54th Annual Grammy Awards held at the Staples Center in Los Angeles, followed by her duet single "Princess of China" with Coldplay for first time. John Mitchell from MTV News said he thought Rihanna looked "gorgeous" and that she gave "off a Tina Turner vibe — Rihanna rocked the blond locks she introduced recently, wearing a tight, belly-baring ensemble." USA Today's writer Ed Masley, praised the performance, describing it as "shout in shout-out". The Huffington Post also noted that the performance had "a twinge of Tina Turner". Time magazine graded the performance with an A, saying that "Rihanna never disappoints. Her pop songs are always danceable, often catchy and consistently awesome — sometimes they even have some substance to them. Similarly, her Grammy performance wasn't the flashiest or craziest, and she didn’t bust out dance moves the way other entertainers did, but it was one of the most enjoyable."

Later that month, the singer performed the song at the Brit Awards held on February 21, 2012, at the O2 Arena in London. The performance began with Rihanna, in only an old grandad-style jumper covering her body, in a clear cage as colourful paint began to be thrown inside with her, although none was thrown onto the singer herself. Dancers were also present as Rihanna emerged from the cage and began dancing along the broad stretch of stage. The performance concluded with big multi-coloured balloons pouring down red confetti from the ceiling as they burst, finalizing with Rihanna returning to the paint-covered cage and smearing it over herself ending with her silhouette being broadcast through the cage. At the ceremony, Rihanna also won the award for Best International Female Solo Artist. Whilst promoting her first feature film appearance in Battleship, Rihanna made a visit to Japan, performing "We Found Love" on the Japanese music television program Music Station. She donned a traditional kimono and concluded the performance by crowd surfing into the audience. On April 24, 2012, Rihanna performed a special acoustic version of the song at the Time 100 gala for Time's selection of that year's 100 most influential people of which Rihanna was listed. Rihanna later performed "We Found Love" at Radio 1's Hackney Weekend on May 24, 2012, as the seventeenth and final song on the set list. The performance featured a giant sphinx on the stage. On September 9, 2012, Rihanna performed the single (along with "Princess of China" and "Run This Town") with Coldplay and Jay-Z at the closing ceremony of the 2012 Summer Paralympics in London, entering on a steampunk pirate ship and also suspended in the air on a metal bench. On December 9, 2012, Rihanna performed "We Found Love" in a medley with a solo version of "Stay" on the final of ninth season of The X Factor UK. She also performed the song at the 2016 MTV Video Music Awards. She performed the song as part of her set during the halftime show of Super Bowl LVII in 2023.

== Cover versions ==
American singer Tinashe uploaded a music video for her cover on her YouTube account on October 21, 2011. British alternative rock band Coldplay, with whom Rihanna would later collaborate on their song "Princess of China", covered "We Found Love" on October 27, 2011, during a performance at BBC Radio 1's Live Lounge. Jocelyn Vena of MTV News called the performance "flawless", writing "Lead singer Chris Martin's haunting vocals and the band's acoustic rendition, using drums, piano and guitar, play up the sadness of the track." Jason Lipshutz of Billboard magazine also noted that the band used "piano flourishes, a kick drum and a simple guitar lick to convey the song's romantic declaration", while making a ballad which was "reminiscent of Bruno Mars' emotional reworking of Katy Perry's 'California Gurls'". Matthew Perpetua of Rolling Stone wrote: "It may surprise that their rendition is actually pretty good. Whereas Rihanna's version is a thumping rave anthem, Chris Martin and company transform it into a lovely piano ballad nearly indistinguishable from many of their own songs." A writer for The Hollywood Reporter said: "Martin's vocals blend with the piano for a slightly softer take on the tragic love story." On February 17, 2012, British singer Jessie J made a cover of the song on BBC Radio1's Live Lounge.

Lea Michele and Naya Rivera covered the song in the climax of the third season's tenth episode of Glee, "Yes/No". Romanian X Factor contestant Diana Hetea performed "We Found Love" in the "Public's Choice Gala" on December 10, 2011. Even though ill of laryngitis, Hetea's performance was praised all three judges that called it "[The] Perfect match for her!" both visually and vocally. Kris Allen also covered the song mashing it with other songs by Katy Perry and other female artists. Carmen Smith also performed "We Found Love" for her battle round in the Australian Version of the Voice which saw her through to next round.

In September 2012, Kelly Clarkson performed the song during a concert in Virginia Beach. In October 2012, British singer Ed Sheeran did an acoustic cover of the song for Sirius XM Radio. Lindsey Stirling covered it in a music video filmed in a Kenyan village, which Vice criticized for being patronizing. British pop rock band McFly covered "We Found Love" on their "Keep Calm And Play Lounder" tour 2012. Kele Okereke sang a verse of the song as the intro to his band Bloc Party's song "Flux" on their June 2012 U.K. tour. In July 2014, Tori Amos covered the song on her Unrepentant Geraldines Tour. In 2011, Boyce Avenue, a pop rock band, also made an acoustic cover of the song and released it iTunes and their YouTube channel. In November 2012, Forever The Sickest Kids covered the song as part of Punk Goes Pop 5.

YouTubers Tom Scott and Matt Gray spoofed the song in their video 'Ten Illegal Things To Do In London.' The parody, where the song's chorus lyrics are replaced with 'We Flew A Kite In A Public Place,' plays over footage of Gray flying a kite in a public place, which is illegal in the U.K. under the Metropolitan Police Act 1839.

== Remixes ==
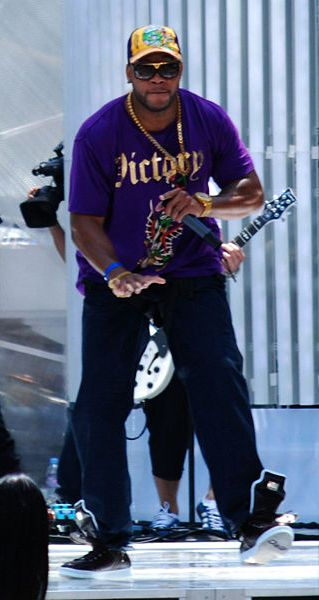
Pictured American rapper Flo Rida was featured on a remix of the song overlapping Calvin Harris' dance beats.

In November 2011, R3hab released a remix of "We Found Love" with a "Halloween" sound. He explained "I made two versions ... one version is more melodic and euphoric. This [first] one is more dark because the lyrics [to] 'We Found Love' can also be seen as something dark. 'We are at the end of the world/ And I still found love.' So from there came the more darker chord progression and the more darker atmosphere, like Dracula is coming to get you. It's just got a lot of emotion and that worked out great for me."

On January 13, 2012, Rap-Up released a remix of "We Found Love" featuring American rapper Flo Rida. Flo Rida's parts overlap Calvin Harris' produced dance beats. In the opening lines, Flo Rida introduces himself and raps tongue twisters about Rihanna and The Bahamas, "You know I got love for you/ See what happened was we in Bahams/ I remember it was the ox summer, oh so pretty I/ ..Girl nice to meet you what's the honour/ Yeah she tap me told me she Rihanna.". He also references singer Mick Jagger singing that he is "rocking a party 'like I'm Mick Jagger." Flo Rida, himself in an interview with NME revealed that it was an honor for him to work with Rihanna. He also revealed that "We Found Love" was one of his favorite songs and that's why he decided to make a remix with Rihanna. He added that Calvin Harris' production impressed him and heavily influenced him on his future work. Rihanna also noted that she decided to work with Flo Rida because of his "wild" productions on his songs.

Andrew Unterberger of the website PopDust wrote that Flo Rida was "exactly" what the original version of "We Found Love" was missing. He added, "No Rihanna, you got it backwards—it's Flo Rida who needs to have other, more talented people on his songs in order to turn them into hits, not the other way around... At least this remix does feature a sizeable contribution from Flo, as he shows up on both the intro and over the song's primary instrumental hook with his trademark unintelligible yammering, though he gets in at least one reference to rocking a party 'like I'm Mick Jagger.'" Matthew Perpetua of Rolling Stone praised the remix of the song, saying that "once again, Flo Rida shows his true rapping skills over the beat of Rihanna's 'We Found Love'". Both Billboard's Erika Ramirez and Spin's Marc Hogan praised the remixed version calling it "refreshing" and "interesting". However, Becky Bain of the website Idolator was more negative towards the remix. She noted, "Being that Rihanna's 'We Found Love' has enough beats and synths to be its own remix, not to mention it couldn't possibly be even more popular on the Hot 100... we find it pointless to release a new version of the single with Flo Rida."

The song was used in an advertisement for Monday.com

== Formats and track listings ==
Digital download
No.	Title	Length
1.	"We Found Love"	3:35

CD single
No.	Title	Length
1.	"We Found Love"	3:36
2.	"We Found Love" (extended version)	5:45

Digital download (the remixes)
No.	Title	Length
1.	"We Found Love" (Chuckie extended remix)	5:57
2.	"We Found Love" (Chuckie dub)	5:56
3.	"We Found Love" (Cahill edit)	3:36
4.	"We Found Love" (Cahill club mix)	6:29
5.	"We Found Love" (Cahill dub)	5:58
6.	"We Found Love" (R3hab's XS remix edit)	3:40
7.	"We Found Love" (R3hab's XS extended remix)	5:26
8.	"We Found Love" (R3hab's XS dub)	5:26

== Credits and personnel ==
Credits adapted from CD single liner notes.

Recording

- Recorded at Fly Eye Studios, London, United Kingdom and Westlake Recording Studios, Los Angeles, California.

Personnel

- Rihanna - vocals
- Calvin Harris – songwriter, producer, recording, mixing and instrumentation
- Marcos Tovar – vocal recording
- Alejandro Barajas – assistant recording engineer
- Phil Tan – mixing
- Damien Lewis – assistant mixing

== Charts ==
=== Weekly charts ===
Contemporaneous weekly chart performance for "We Found Love"
Chart (2011–2012)	Peak position
Australia (ARIA)	2
Austria (Ö3 Austria Top 40)	2
Belgium (Ultratop 50 Flanders)	3
Belgium Dance (Ultratop Flanders)	1
Belgium Urban (Ultratop Flanders)	1
Belgium (Ultratop 50 Wallonia)	2
Belgium Dance (Ultratop Wallonia)	1
Brazil (Billboard Brasil Hot 100)	12
Brazil Hot Pop Songs	2
Bulgaria Airplay (BAMP)	1
Canada Hot 100 (Billboard)	1
CIS Airplay (TopHit)	1
Colombia (National-Report)	5
Croatia International Airplay (HRT)	1
Czech Republic Airplay (ČNS IFPI)	2
Denmark (Tracklisten)	1
Euro Digital Song Sales (Billboard)	1
Finland (Suomen virallinen lista)	1
France (SNEP)	1
Germany (GfK)	1
Greece Digital Songs (Billboard)	2
Hungary (Rádiós Top 40)	1
Ireland (IRMA)	1
Israel International Airplay (Media Forest)	1
Italy (FIMI)	3
Japan (Japan Hot 100)	6
Lebanon (Lebanese Top 20)	1
Luxembourg (Billboard)	1
Mexico (Billboard Mexican Airplay)	1
Mexico Anglo (Monitor Latino)	1
Netherlands (Dutch Top 40)	3
Netherlands (Single Top 100)	3
New Zealand (Recorded Music NZ)	1
Norway (VG-lista)	1
Poland Airplay (ZPAV)	1
Poland (Dance Top 50)	1
Portugal (Billboard)	1
Romania Airplay (Media Forest)	2
Russia Airplay (TopHit)	1
Scottish Singles Sales (Official Charts)	1
Slovakia Airplay (ČNS IFPI)	1
South Korea (Circle)	39
Spain (Promusicae)	2
Sweden (Sverigetopplistan)	1
Switzerland (Schweizer Hitparade)	1
UK Singles (Official Charts)	1
UK Dance (Official Charts)	1
Ukraine Airplay (TopHit)	7
US Billboard Hot 100	1
US Adult Contemporary (Billboard)	14
US Adult Pop Airplay (Billboard)	5
US Dance Airplay (Billboard)	1
US Dance Club Songs (Billboard)	1
US Hot R&B/Hip-Hop Songs (Billboard)	54
US Hot Latin Songs (Billboard)	3
US Latin Airplay (Billboard)	3
US Latin Pop Airplay (Billboard)	2
US Pop Airplay (Billboard)	1
US R&B/Hip-Hop Airplay (Billboard)	54
US Rhythmic Airplay (Billboard)	1
US Tropical Airplay (Billboard)	7
Venezuela Pop/Rock Songs (Record Report)	1

2023 weekly chart performance for "We Found Love"
Chart (2023)	Peak position
Canada (Canadian Hot 100)	33
Global 200 (Billboard)	47
Portugal (AFP)	121
US Billboard Hot 100	48
US Hot Dance/Electronic Songs (Billboard)	3

2026 weekly chart performance for "We Found Love"
Chart (2026)	Peak position
Latvia Streaming (LaIPA)	15

=== Year-end charts ===
2011 year-end chart performance for "We Found Love"
Chart (2011)	Position
Australia (ARIA)	12
Austria (Ö3 Austria Top 40)	30
Belgium (Ultratop 50 Flanders)	24
Belgium (Ultratop 40 Wallonia)	39
Brazil (Crowley)	58
Canada (Canadian Hot 100)	43
Denmark (Tracklisten)	8
France (SNEP)	13
Germany (Official German Charts)	13
Greece (IFPI)	96
Hungary (Rádiós Top 40)	87
Ireland (IRMA)	3
Israel (Media Forest)	31
Italy (FIMI)	20
Japan (Japan Hot 100)	95
Netherlands (Dutch Top 40)	25
Netherlands (Mega Single Top 100)	18
New Zealand (RIANZ)	5
Romania (Romanian Top 100)	80
Russia Airplay (TopHit)	105
Spain (PROMUSICAE)	25
Sweden (Sverigetopplistan)	10
Switzerland (Schweizer Hitparade)	13
UK Singles (Official Charts Company)	5
US Billboard Hot 100	69

2012 year-end chart performance for "We Found Love"
Chart (2012)	Position
Australia (ARIA)	89
Belgium (Ultratop 50 Flanders)	46
Belgium Dance (Ultratop Flanders)	49
Belgium (Ultratop 40 Wallonia)	42
Belgium Dance (Ultratop Wallonia)	47
Brazil (Crowley)	69
Canada (Canadian Hot 100)	6
France (SNEP)	59
Germany (Official German Charts)	82
Greece (IFPI)	57
Israel (Media Forest)	19
Italy (FIMI)	54
Hungary (Rádiós Top 40)	20
Japan (Japan Hot 100)	32
Netherlands (Dutch Top 40)	73
Netherlands (Mega Single Top 100)	84
Poland (ZPAV)	3
Russia Airplay (TopHit)	10
Spain (PROMUSICAE)	19
Sweden (Sverigetopplistan)	26
Switzerland (Schweizer Hitparade)	47
Ukraine Airplay (TopHit)	23
UK Singles (Official Charts Company)	56
US Billboard Hot 100	8
US Adult Contemporary (Billboard)	34
US Adult Pop Songs (Billboard)	21
US Dance/Mix Show Airplay (Billboard)	5
US Hot Latin Songs (Billboard)	24
US Pop Songs (Billboard)	2
US Radio Songs (Billboard)	2
US Rhythmic (Billboard)	4

2013 year-end chart performance for "We Found Love"
Chart (2013)	Position
France (SNEP)	157

2023 year-end chart performance for "We Found Love"
Chart (2023)	Position
US Hot Dance/Electronic Songs (Billboard)	42

=== Decade-end charts ===
2010s-end chart performance for "We Found Love"
Chart (2010–2019)	Position
Australia (ARIA)	48
UK Singles (OCC)	43
US Billboard Hot 100	6

=== All-time charts ===
All-time chart performance for "We Found Love"
Chart	Position
UK Singles (OCC)	51
US Billboard Hot 100	29
US Mainstream Top 40 (Billboard)	17

== Certifications and sales ==
Certifications
Region	Certification	Certified units/sales
Australia (ARIA)	17× Platinum	1,190,000^{‡}
Belgium (BRMA)	Platinum	30,000^{*}
Brazil (Pro-Música Brasil)	14× Diamond	3,500,000^{‡}
Denmark (IFPI Danmark)	4× Platinum	360,000^{‡}
France	—	230,000
Germany (BVMI)	3× Platinum	900,000^{‡}
Italy (FIMI)	3× Platinum	90,000^{‡}
Japan (RIAJ)	Platinum	250,000^{*}
New Zealand (RMNZ)	8× Platinum	240,000^{‡}
Portugal (AFP)	Platinum	20,000^{‡}
Spain (Promusicae)	3× Platinum	180,000^{‡}
Sweden (GLF)	6× Platinum	240,000^{‡}
Switzerland (IFPI Switzerland)	2× Platinum	60,000^{^}
United Kingdom (BPI)	6× Platinum	3,600,000^{‡}
United States (RIAA)	11× Platinum	11,000,000^{‡}
Streaming
Greece (IFPI Greece)	Gold	1,000,000^{†}
Summaries
Worldwide	—	10,500,000
^{*} Sales figures based on certification alone.^{^} Shipments figures based on certification alone.^{‡} Sales+streaming figures based on certification alone.^{†} Streaming-only figures based on certification alone.

== Release history ==
Release dates
Region	Date	Format	Version	Label	Ref.
Australia	September 22, 2011	Digital download	Original	Def Jam	
Belgium	September 22, 2011	Digital download	Original	Def Jam	
Canada	September 22, 2011	Digital download	Original	Def Jam	
Denmark	September 22, 2011	Digital download	Original	Def Jam	
France	September 22, 2011	Digital download	Original	Def Jam	
Ireland	September 22, 2011	Digital download	Original	Def Jam	
Italy	September 22, 2011	Digital download	Original	Def Jam	
Mexico	September 22, 2011	Digital download	Original	Def Jam	
Netherlands	September 22, 2011	Digital download	Original	Def Jam	
New Zealand	September 22, 2011	Digital download	Original	Def Jam	
Norway	September 22, 2011	Digital download	Original	Def Jam	
Spain	September 22, 2011	Digital download	Original	Def Jam	
Sweden	September 22, 2011	Digital download	Original	Def Jam	
Switzerland	September 22, 2011	Digital download	Original	Def Jam	
United Kingdom	September 22, 2011	Digital download	Original	Def Jam	
United Kingdom	September 22, 2011	Radio premiere	Original	Mercury	
United States	September 22, 2011	Digital download	Original	Def Jam	
Brazil	September 23, 2011	Digital download	Original	Universal	
Italy	September 30, 2011	Radio airplay	Original	Universal	
United States	October 4, 2011	Urban contemporary radio	Original	Def Jam	
United States	October 11, 2011	Contemporary hit radio; rhythmic contemporary radio	Original	Def Jam	
Germany	October 21, 2011	CD	2-track	Universal	
Australia	November 8, 2011	Digital download	The remixes	Def Jam	

== See also ==
- List of best-selling singles in the United States
- List of best-selling singles in Australia
- List of best-selling singles in Brazil
- List of Billboard Hot 100 top-ten singles in 2011
- List of Billboard Hot 100 top-ten singles in 2012
- List of Billboard Hot 100 number ones of 2011
- List of Billboard Hot 100 number ones of 2012
- List of Hot 100 number-one singles of 2011 (Brazil)
- List of Canadian Hot 100 number-one singles of 2011
- List of Canadian Hot 100 number-one singles of 2012
- List of number-one hits of 2011 (Denmark)
- List of number-one singles of 2011 (Finland)
- List of number-one singles of 2011 (France)
- List of number-one hits of 2011 (Germany)
- List of number-one singles of the 2010s (Hungary)
- List of number-one singles of 2011 (Ireland)
- List of number-one singles from the 2010s (New Zealand)
- List of number-one songs in Norway
- List of number-one singles of 2012 (Poland)
- List of number-one singles and albums in Sweden
- List of number-one hits of 2011 (Switzerland)
- List of UK Singles Chart number ones of the 2010s
- List of UK Dance Singles Chart number ones of 2011
- List of Billboard Dance Club Songs number ones of 2011
- List of number-one digital songs of 2011 (U.S.)
- List of Billboard Mainstream Top 40 number-one songs of 2011
- List of Billboard Mainstream Top 40 number-one songs of 2012
- List of Radio Songs number ones of the 2010s
- List of UK top-ten singles in 2011
- List of UK top-ten singles in 2012
