= Bridge (music) =

Contrasting section of music

The ragtime progression (E^{7}-A^{7}-D^{7}-G^{7}) often appears in the bridge of jazz standards. The III^{7}-VI^{7}-II^{7}-V^{7} (or V^{7}/V/V/V–V^{7}/V/V–V^{7}/V–V^{7}) leads back to C major (I) but is itself indefinite in key.

In music, especially Western popular music, a bridge is a contrasting section that prepares for the return of the original material section. It adds a sense of progress within a piece of music and can be used to introduce a source of tension. In a piece in which the original material or melody is referred to as the "A" section, the bridge may be the third eight-bar phrase in a 32-bar form (the B in AABA), or may be used more loosely in verse-chorus form, or, in a compound AABA form, used as a contrast to a full AABA section.

The bridge is often used to contrast with and prepare for the return of the verse and the chorus. "The b section of the popular song chorus is often called the bridge or release", or boredom-breaker.

== Etymology ==
The term is a calque from a German word for bridge, Steg, used by the Meistersingers of the 15th to the 18th century to describe a transitional section in medieval bar form. The German term became widely known in 1920s Germany through musicologist Alfred Lorenz and his exhaustive studies of Richard Wagner's adaptations of bar form in his popular 19th-century neo-medieval operas. The term entered the English lexicon in the 1930s—translated as bridge—via composers fleeing Nazi Germany who, working in Hollywood and on Broadway, used the term to describe similar transitional sections in the American popular music they were writing.

== In classical music ==
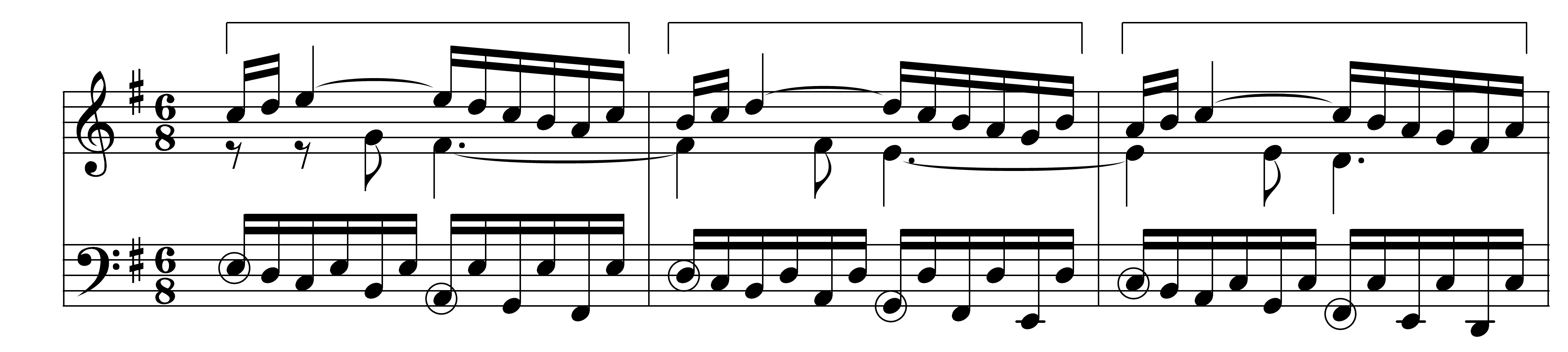
Bridge in J. S. Bach's Fugue in G major BWV 860, mm. 17-19

Bridges are also common in classical music, and are known as a specific sequence form—also known as transitions. Formally called a bridge-passage, they delineate separate sections of an extended work, or smooth what would otherwise be an abrupt modulation, such as the transition between the two themes of a sonata form. In the latter context, this transition between two musical subjects is often referred to as the "transition theme"; indeed, in later Romantic symphonies such as Dvořák's New World Symphony or César Franck's Symphony in D minor, the transition theme becomes almost a third subject in itself.

The latter work also provides several good examples of a short bridge to smooth a modulation. Instead of simply repeating the whole exposition in the original key, as would be done in a symphony of the classical period, Franck repeats the first subject a minor third higher in F minor. A two-bar bridge achieves this transition with Franck's characteristic combination of enharmonic and chromatic modulation. After the repeat of the first subject, another bridge of four bars leads into the transition theme in F major, the key of the true second subject.

In a fugue, a bridge is

[A] short passage at the end of the first entrance of the answer and the beginning of the second entrance of the subject. Its purpose is to modulate back to the tonic key (subject) from the answer (which is in the dominant key). Not all fugues include a bridge.

An example of a bridge-passage that separates two sections of a more loosely organized work occurs in George Gershwin's An American in Paris. As Deems Taylor described it in the program notes for the first performance:

Having safely eluded the taxis ... the American's itinerary becomes somewhat obscured. ... However, since what immediately ensues is technically known as a bridge-passage, one is reasonably justified in assuming that the Gershwin pen ... has perpetrated a musical pun and that ... our American has crossed the Seine, and is somewhere on the Left Bank.

== In popular music ==
Bridges are part of the formula for drafting a hit song in Western popular music. Songwriters use bridges to bring variety to a song, whether it be through a new melody, chord progression, or lyrics. Of the Billboard Year-End Hot 100 list of 2011, 80% of the top 20 songs follow a song form including a bridge.

== See also ==
- Break (music)
- Montgomery-Ward bridge
- Sears Roebuck bridge
- Song structure
