= List of Billboard Hot 100 number-one singles of the 2010s =

The Billboard Hot 100 is a chart that ranks the best-performing songs of the United States. Published by Billboard magazine, the data are compiled by Nielsen SoundScan based collectively on each single's weekly physical and digital sales, airplay, and, since 2012, streaming. Streaming became the dominant metric of the Hot 100 beginning in 2015, propelled by technology changes.

A new chart is compiled and officially released to the public every Tuesday in Billboard magazine and on its website. Each chart is dated with the "week-ending" date of the Saturday four days later. Before 2018, the gap between the chart date and the date of its release was one week longer, and prior to the July 25, 2015 issue, the chart was released every Thursday.

== Number-one singles ==
Key
♪ – Number-one single of the year

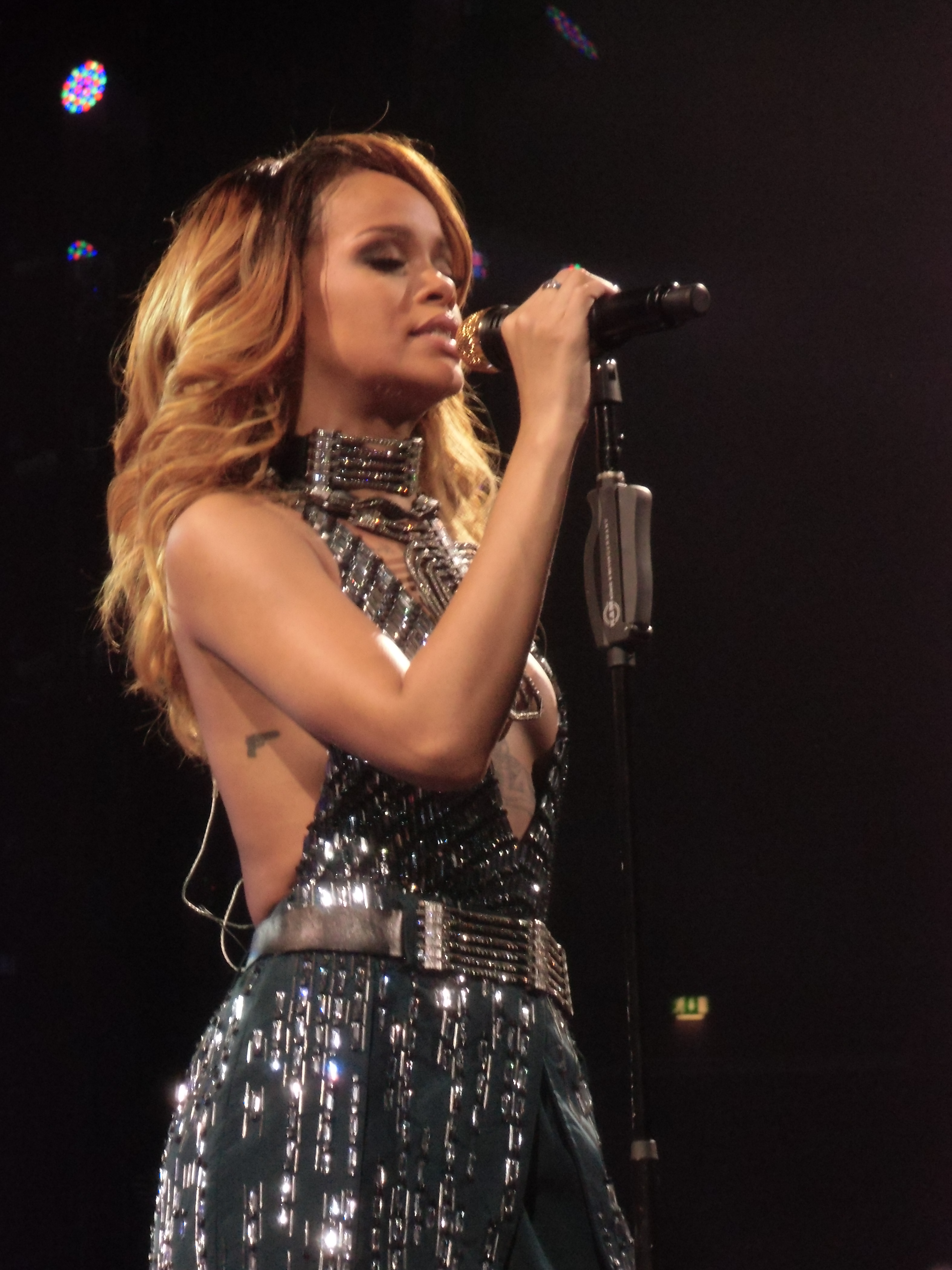
Rihanna scored the most number-one singles in the 2010s (nine), accumulating 41 cumulative weeks atop the Billboard Hot 100.

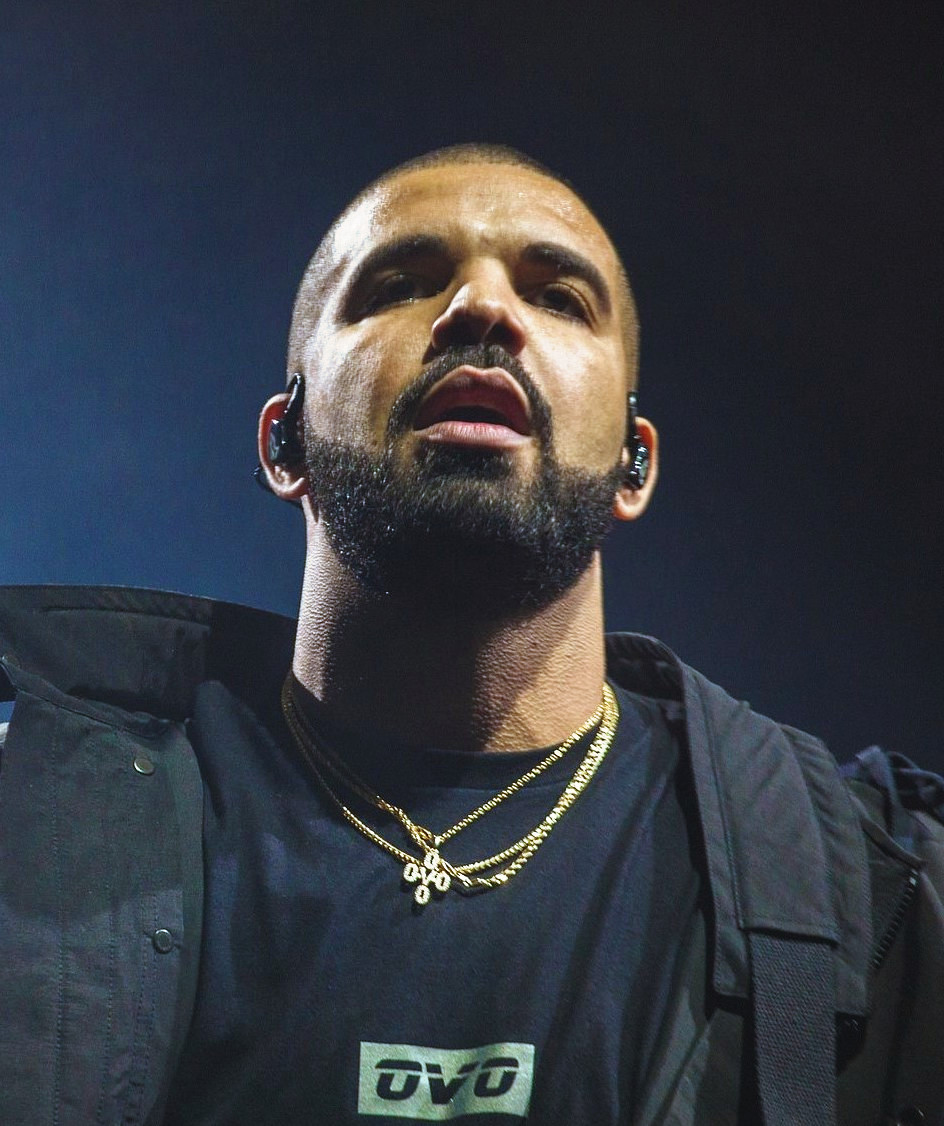
Drake had the longest cumulative run at number one in the decade (49 weeks), aided by six number-one singles, with three songs spending over 10 weeks atop the chart: "One Dance", 2018's number-one single "God's Plan" and "In My Feelings".

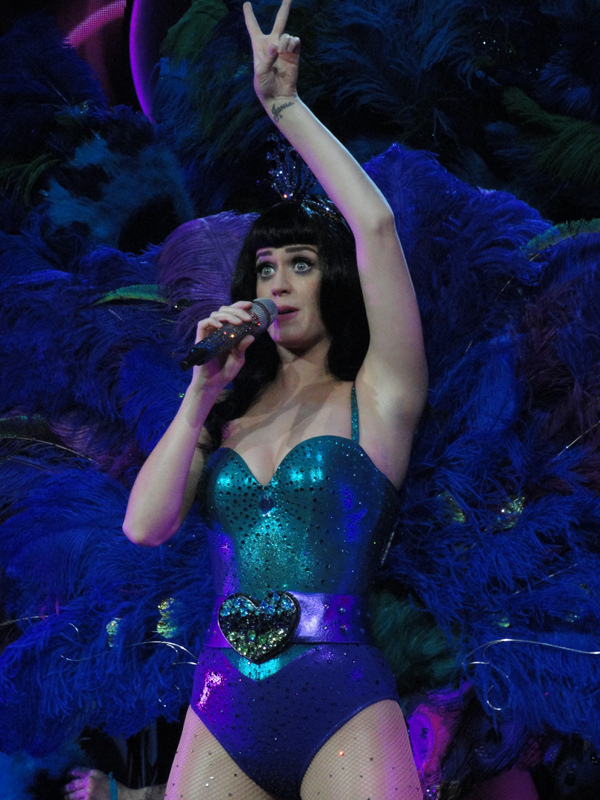
Katy Perry gathered eight number-one singles, spending 26 weeks atop the Hot 100.

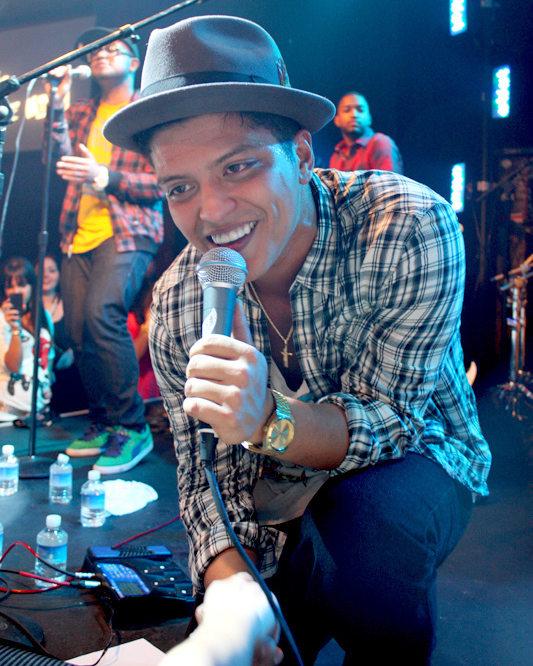
Bruno Mars spent 32 weeks atop the chart with seven entries, including "Uptown Funk", which topped the Decade-End chart.

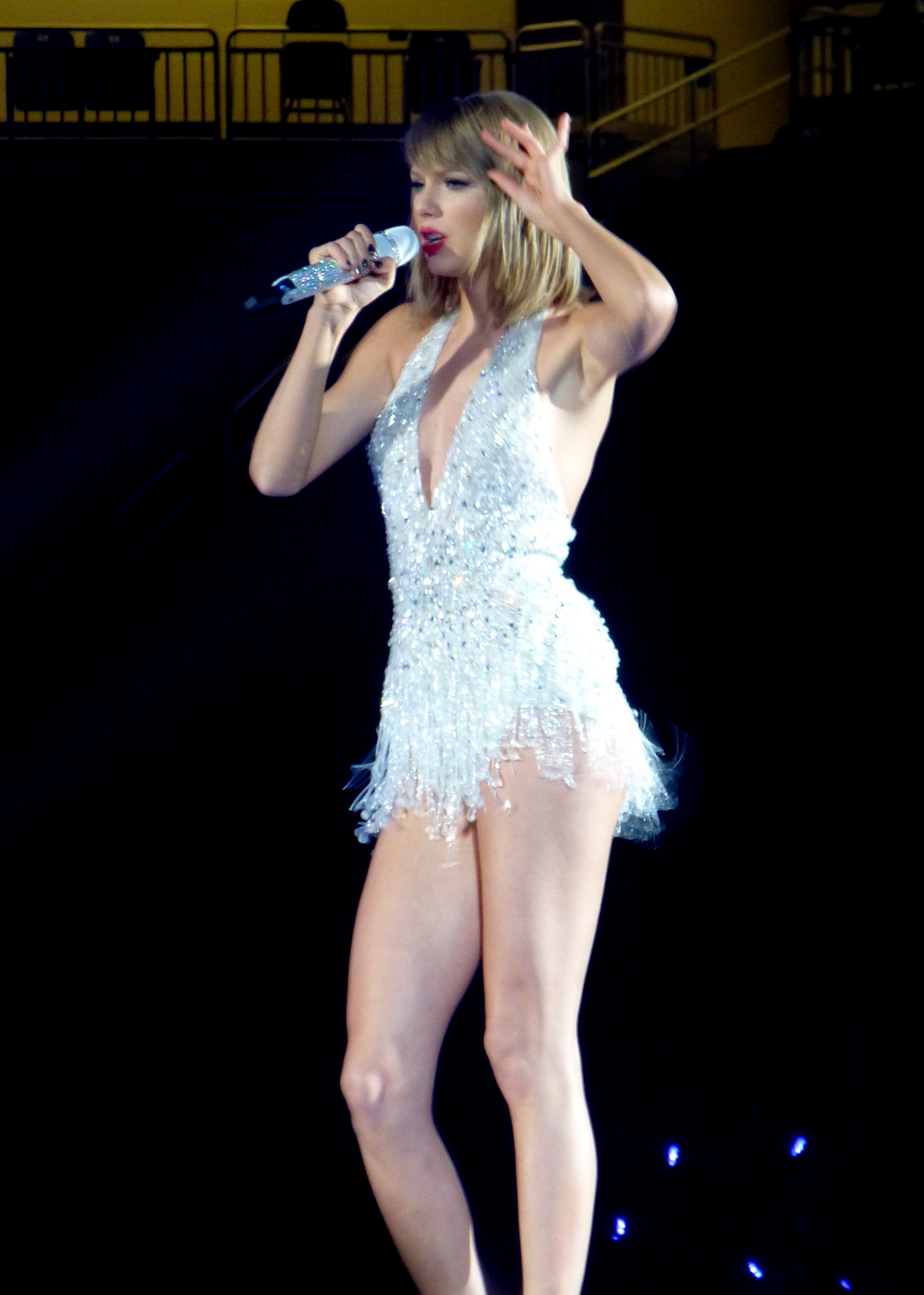
Taylor Swift accumulated five number-one singles, totalling 18 weeks at the summit of the Hot 100 chart.

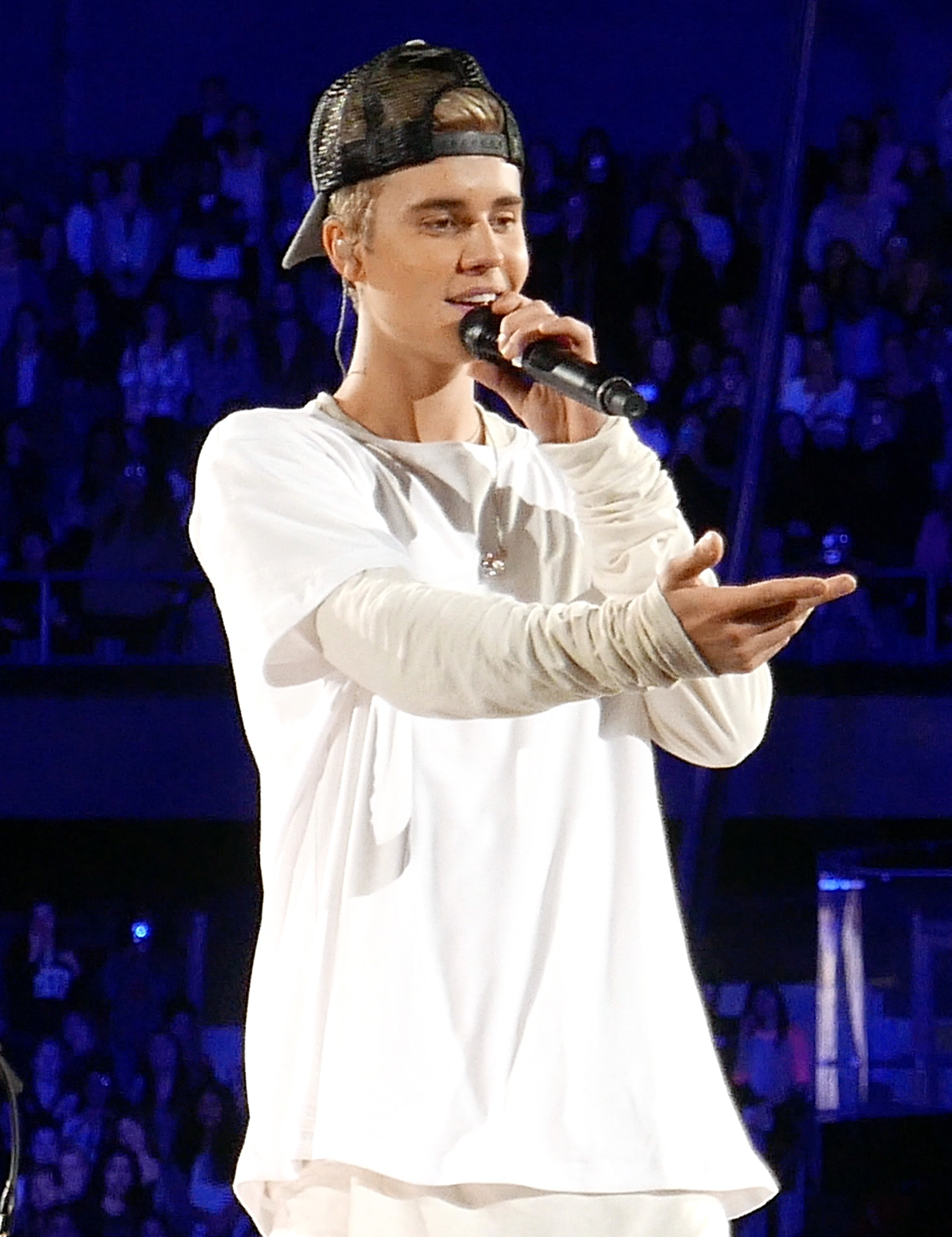
Justin Bieber amassed five number-one songs, including the number-one single of 2016, "Love Yourself", and "Despacito", which spent 16 weeks atop the Hot 100.

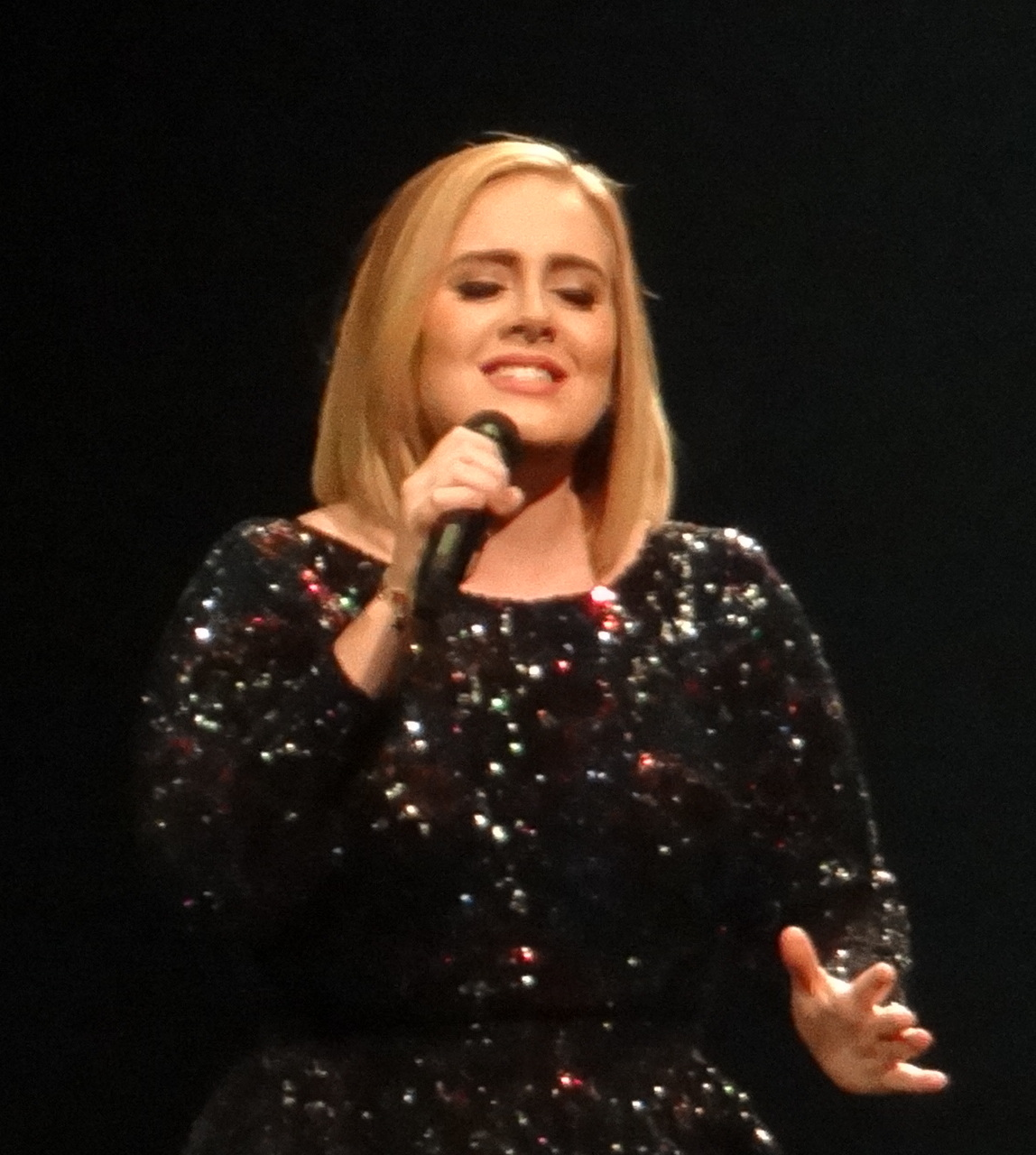
Adele spent 24 weeks at number one, aided by four entries, including the number-one single of 2011, "Rolling in the Deep".

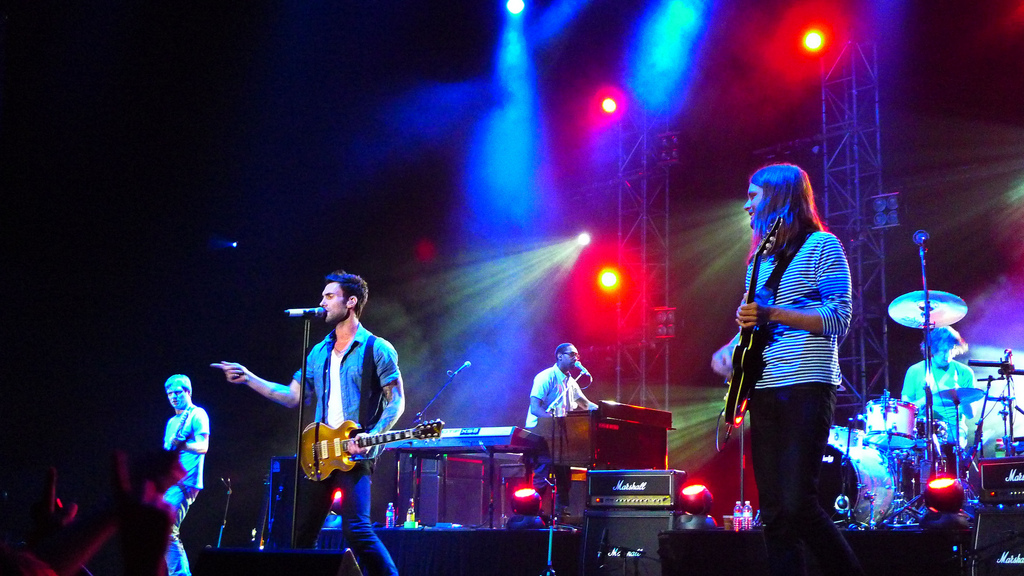
Maroon 5 became the most successful band of the 2010s, with three songs and 20 weeks atop the chart.

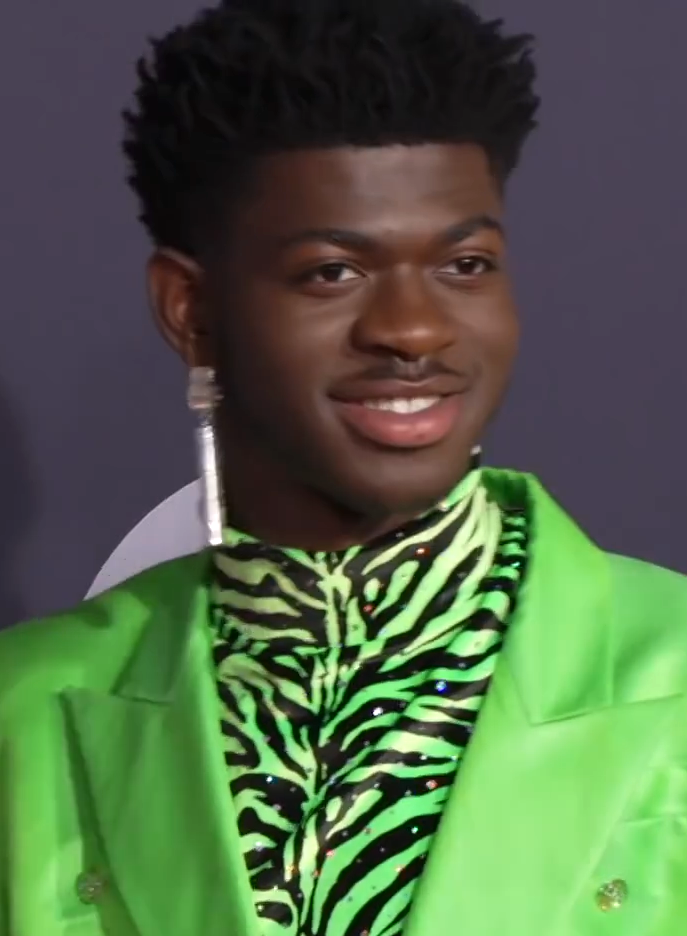
"Old Town Road" by Lil Nas X spent 19 weeks atop the Hot 100, which at the time was a record.

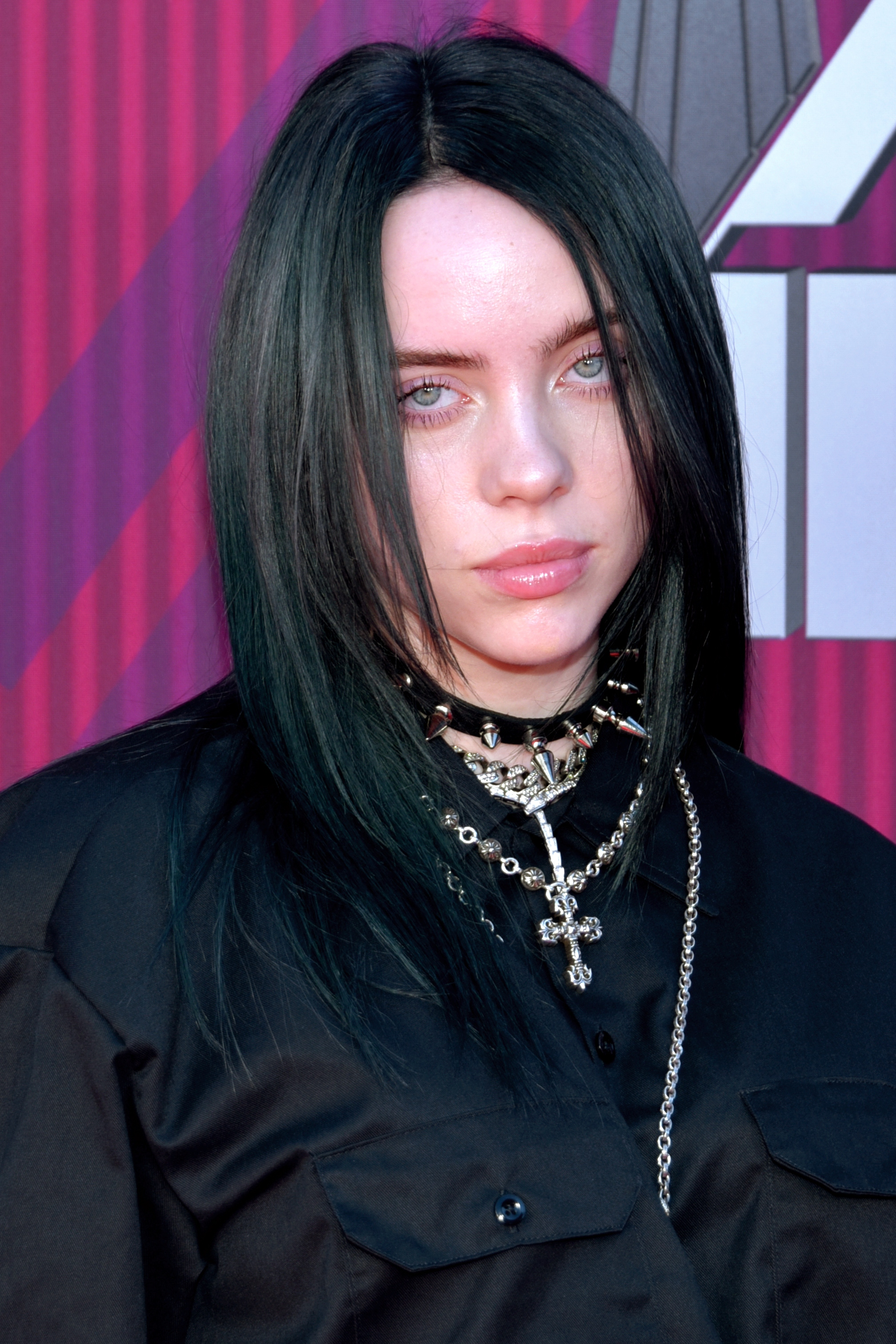
Billie Eilish became the first artist born in the 21st century to have a number-one song on the Hot 100, with "Bad Guy".

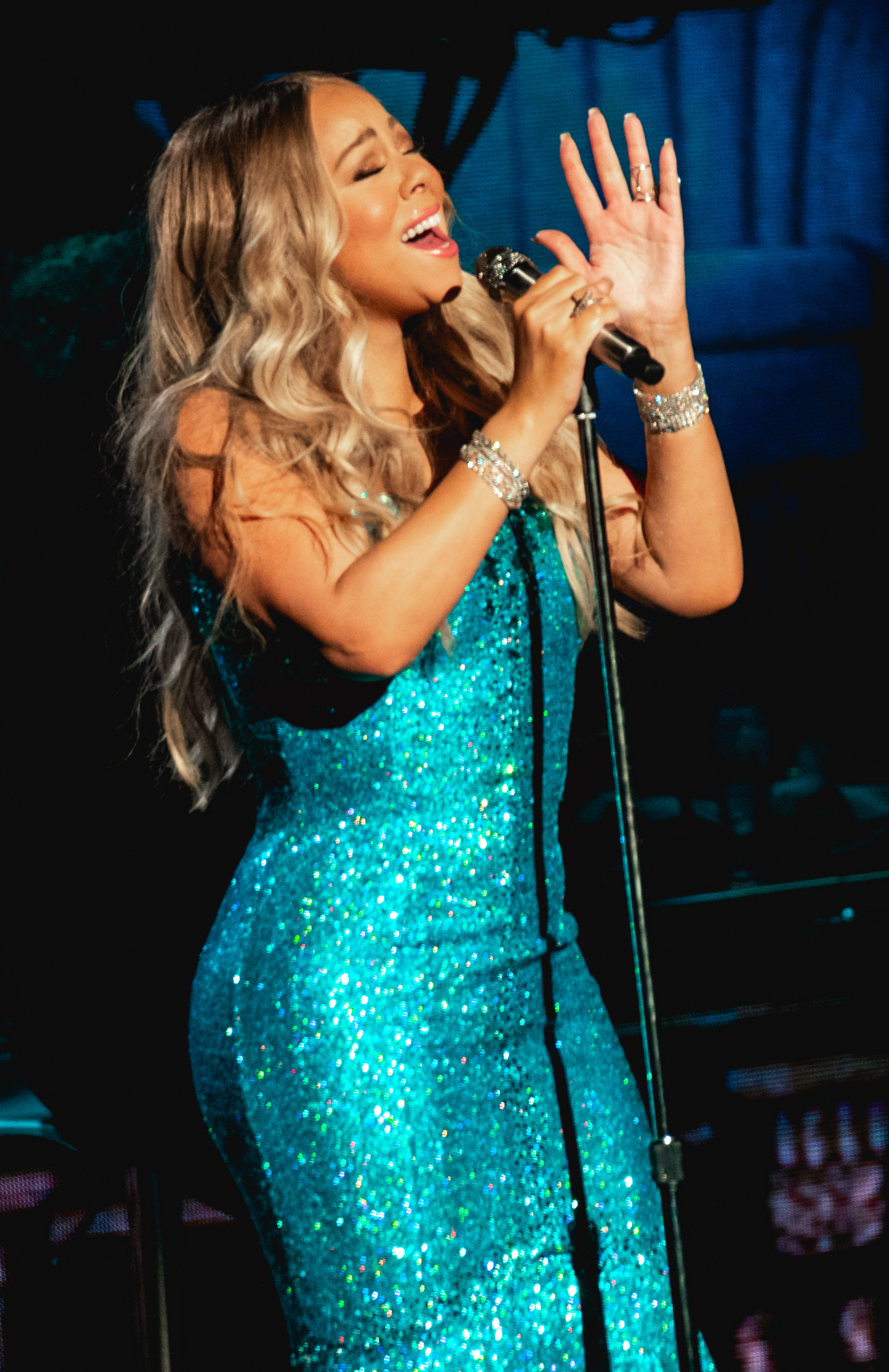
Mariah Carey scored her 19th chart-topper and became only the second artist to score a Christmas number-one hit, with "All I Want For Christmas Is You", since "The Chipmunk Song" in 1958. The song topped the chart for the first time in 2019, 25 years after release, and has returned to number-one every holiday season since.

#	Reached number one	Artist(s)	Single	Weeks at number one	Reference
2010
980	January 2, 2010	Kesha	"Tik Tok"♪	9	
981	March 6, 2010	The Black Eyed Peas	"Imma Be"	2	
982	March 20, 2010	Taio Cruz featuring Ludacris	"Break Your Heart"	1	
983	March 27, 2010	Rihanna	"Rude Boy"	5	
984	May 1, 2010	B.o.B featuring Bruno Mars	"Nothin' on You"	2	
985	May 15, 2010	Usher featuring will.i.am	"OMG"	4	
986	May 22, 2010	Eminem	"Not Afraid"	1	
987	June 19, 2010	Katy Perry featuring Snoop Dogg	"California Gurls"	6	
988	July 31, 2010	Eminem featuring Rihanna	"Love the Way You Lie"	7	
989	September 18, 2010	Katy Perry	"Teenage Dream"	2	
990	October 2, 2010	Bruno Mars	"Just the Way You Are"	4	
991	October 30, 2010	Far East Movement featuring The Cataracs and Dev	"Like a G6"	3	
992	November 13, 2010	Kesha	"We R Who We R"	1	
993	November 20, 2010	Rihanna featuring Drake	"What's My Name?"	1	
994	December 4, 2010	Rihanna	"Only Girl (In the World)"	1	
995	December 11, 2010	Pink	"Raise Your Glass"	1	
996	December 18, 2010	Katy Perry	"Firework"	4	
2011
997	January 8, 2011	Bruno Mars	"Grenade"	4	
998	January 29, 2011	Britney Spears	"Hold It Against Me"	1	
999	February 19, 2011	Wiz Khalifa	"Black and Yellow"	1	
1000	February 26, 2011	Lady Gaga	"Born This Way"	6	
1001	April 9, 2011	Katy Perry featuring Kanye West	"E.T."	5	
1002	April 30, 2011	Rihanna featuring Britney Spears	"S&M"	1	
1003	May 21, 2011	Adele	"Rolling in the Deep"♪	7	
1004	July 9, 2011	Pitbull featuring Ne-Yo, Afrojack and Nayer	"Give Me Everything"	1	
1005	July 16, 2011	LMFAO featuring Lauren Bennett and GoonRock	"Party Rock Anthem"	6	
1006	August 27, 2011	Katy Perry	"Last Friday Night (T.G.I.F.)"	2	
1007	September 10, 2011	Maroon 5 featuring Christina Aguilera	"Moves Like Jagger"	4	
1008	September 17, 2011	Adele	"Someone Like You"	5	
1009	November 12, 2011	Rihanna featuring Calvin Harris	"We Found Love"	10	
2012
1010	January 7, 2012	LMFAO	"Sexy and I Know It"	2	
1011	February 4, 2012	Adele	"Set Fire to the Rain"	2	
1012	February 18, 2012	Kelly Clarkson	"Stronger (What Doesn't Kill You)"	3	
1013	March 3, 2012	Katy Perry	"Part of Me"	1	
1014	March 17, 2012	Fun featuring Janelle Monáe	"We Are Young"	6	
1015	April 28, 2012	Gotye featuring Kimbra	"Somebody That I Used to Know"♪	8	
1016	June 23, 2012	Carly Rae Jepsen	"Call Me Maybe"	9	
1017	August 25, 2012	Flo Rida	"Whistle"	2	
1018	September 1, 2012	Taylor Swift	"We Are Never Ever Getting Back Together"	3	
1019	September 29, 2012	Maroon 5	"One More Night"	9	
1020	December 1, 2012	Rihanna	"Diamonds"	3	
1021	December 22, 2012	Bruno Mars	"Locked Out of Heaven"	6	
2013
1022	February 2, 2013	Macklemore & Ryan Lewis featuring Wanz	"Thrift Shop"♪	6	
1023	March 2, 2013	Baauer	"Harlem Shake"	5	
1024	April 20, 2013	Bruno Mars	"When I Was Your Man"	1	
1025	April 27, 2013	Pink featuring Nate Ruess	"Just Give Me a Reason"	3	
1026	May 18, 2013	Macklemore & Ryan Lewis featuring Ray Dalton	"Can't Hold Us"	5	
1027	June 22, 2013	Robin Thicke featuring T.I. and Pharrell	"Blurred Lines"	12	
1028	September 14, 2013	Katy Perry	"Roar"	2	
1029	September 28, 2013	Miley Cyrus	"Wrecking Ball"	3	
1030	October 12, 2013	Lorde	"Royals"	9	
1031	December 21, 2013	Eminem featuring Rihanna	"The Monster"	4	
2014
1032	January 18, 2014	Pitbull featuring Kesha	"Timber"	3	
1033	February 8, 2014	Katy Perry featuring Juicy J	"Dark Horse"	4	
1034	March 8, 2014	Pharrell Williams	"Happy"♪	10	
1035	May 17, 2014	John Legend	"All of Me"	3	
1036	June 7, 2014	Iggy Azalea featuring Charli XCX	"Fancy"	7	
1037	July 26, 2014	Magic!	"Rude"	6	
1038	September 6, 2014	Taylor Swift	"Shake It Off"	4	
1039	September 20, 2014	Meghan Trainor	"All About That Bass"	8	
1040	November 29, 2014	Taylor Swift	"Blank Space"	7	
2015
1041	January 17, 2015	Mark Ronson featuring Bruno Mars	"Uptown Funk"♪	14	
1042	April 25, 2015	Wiz Khalifa featuring Charlie Puth	"See You Again"	12	
1043	June 6, 2015	Taylor Swift featuring Kendrick Lamar	"Bad Blood"	1	
1044	July 25, 2015	Omi	"Cheerleader"	6	
1045	August 22, 2015	The Weeknd	"Can't Feel My Face"	3	
1046	September 19, 2015	Justin Bieber	"What Do You Mean?"	1	
1047	October 3, 2015	The Weeknd	"The Hills"	6	
1048	November 14, 2015	Adele	"Hello"	10	
2016
1049	January 23, 2016	Justin Bieber	"Sorry"	3	
1050	February 13, 2016	Justin Bieber	"Love Yourself"♪	2	
1051	February 20, 2016	Zayn	"Pillowtalk"	1	
1052	March 5, 2016	Rihanna featuring Drake	"Work"	9	
1053	May 7, 2016	Desiigner	"Panda"	2	
1054	May 21, 2016	Drake featuring WizKid and Kyla	"One Dance"	10	
1055	May 28, 2016	Justin Timberlake	"Can't Stop the Feeling!"	1	
1056	August 6, 2016	Sia featuring Sean Paul	"Cheap Thrills"	4	
1057	September 3, 2016	The Chainsmokers featuring Halsey	"Closer"	12	
1058	November 26, 2016	Rae Sremmurd featuring Gucci Mane	"Black Beatles"	7	
2017
1059	January 7, 2017	The Weeknd featuring Daft Punk	"Starboy"	1	
1060	January 21, 2017	Migos featuring Lil Uzi Vert	"Bad and Boujee"	3	
1061	January 28, 2017	Ed Sheeran	"Shape of You"♪	12	
1062	May 6, 2017	Kendrick Lamar	"Humble"	1	
1063	May 13, 2017	Bruno Mars	"That's What I Like"	1	
1064	May 20, 2017	DJ Khaled featuring Justin Bieber, Quavo, Chance the Rapper and Lil Wayne	"I'm the One"	1	
1065	May 27, 2017	Luis Fonsi and Daddy Yankee featuring Justin Bieber	"Despacito"	16	
1066	September 16, 2017	Taylor Swift	"Look What You Made Me Do"	3	
1067	October 7, 2017	Cardi B	"Bodak Yellow"	3	
1068	October 28, 2017	Post Malone featuring 21 Savage	"Rockstar"	8	
1069	December 23, 2017	Ed Sheeran / Ed Sheeran and Beyoncé^{1}	"Perfect"	6	
2018
1070	January 27, 2018	Camila Cabello featuring Young Thug	"Havana"	1	
1071	February 3, 2018	Drake	"God's Plan"♪	11	
1072	April 21, 2018	Drake	"Nice for What"	8	
1073	May 19, 2018	Childish Gambino	"This Is America"	2	
1074	June 16, 2018	Post Malone featuring Ty Dolla Sign	"Psycho"	1	
1075	June 30, 2018	XXXTentacion	"Sad!"	1	
1076	July 7, 2018	Cardi B, Bad Bunny and J Balvin	"I Like It"	1	
1077	July 21, 2018	Drake	"In My Feelings"	10	
1078	September 29, 2018	Maroon 5 featuring Cardi B	"Girls Like You"	7	
1079	November 17, 2018	Ariana Grande	"Thank U, Next"	7	
1080	December 8, 2018	Travis Scott	"Sicko Mode"	1	
2019
1081	January 12, 2019	Halsey	"Without Me"	2	
1082	January 19, 2019	Post Malone and Swae Lee	"Sunflower"	1	
1083	February 2, 2019	Ariana Grande	"7 Rings"	8	
1084	March 9, 2019	Lady Gaga and Bradley Cooper	"Shallow"	1	
1085	March 16, 2019	Jonas Brothers	"Sucker"	1	
1086	April 13, 2019	Lil Nas X / Lil Nas X featuring Billy Ray Cyrus^{2}	"Old Town Road" ♪	19	
1087	August 24, 2019	Billie Eilish	"Bad Guy"	1	
1088	August 31, 2019	Shawn Mendes and Camila Cabello	"Señorita"	1	
1089	September 7, 2019	Lizzo	"Truth Hurts"	7	
1090	October 19, 2019	Travis Scott	"Highest in the Room"	1	
1091	November 2, 2019	Lewis Capaldi	"Someone You Loved"	3	
1092	November 9, 2019	Selena Gomez	"Lose You to Love Me"	1	
1093	November 30, 2019	Post Malone	"Circles"	3	
1094	December 14, 2019	The Weeknd	"Heartless"	1	
1095	December 21, 2019	Mariah Carey	"All I Want for Christmas Is You"	3^{3}	

Notes
^{1} For the first five weeks that "Perfect" by Ed Sheeran was at number one, the duet version between Sheeran and Beyoncé was the song's billing on the Hot 100.
^{2} For the first week that "Old Town Road" by Lil Nas X was at number one, the solo version was the song's billing on the Hot 100. The remix with Billy Ray Cyrus hit number one the following week.
^{3} Across seven separate holiday season runs (2019–2025), "All I Want for Christmas Is You" has accumulated 20 total weeks at number one. It is the longest-running number-one song of all-time and the first song in the history of the Hot 100 to reach number one in at least three separate chart runs.

== Statistics ==
=== Artists by total number-one singles ===
The following artists achieved three or more number-one singles during the 2010s. A number of artists had number-one singles on their own as well as part of a collaboration.

Artist	Number-one singles	Singles
Rihanna	9	"Rude Boy" "Love the Way You Lie" "What's My Name?" "Only Girl (In the World)" "S&M" "We Found Love" "Diamonds" "The Monster" "Work"
Katy Perry	8	"California Gurls" "Teenage Dream" "Firework" "E.T." "Last Friday Night (T.G.I.F.)" "Part of Me" "Roar" "Dark Horse"
Bruno Mars	7	"Nothin' on You" "Just the Way You Are" "Grenade" "Locked Out of Heaven" "When I Was Your Man" "Uptown Funk" "That's What I Like"
Drake	6	"What's My Name?" "Work" "One Dance" "God's Plan" "Nice for What" "In My Feelings"
Justin Bieber	5	"What Do You Mean?" "Sorry" "Love Yourself" "I'm the One" "Despacito"
Taylor Swift	5	"We Are Never Ever Getting Back Together" "Shake It Off" "Blank Space" "Bad Blood" "Look What You Made Me Do"
Adele	4	"Rolling in the Deep" "Someone Like You" "Set Fire to the Rain" "Hello"
Post Malone	4	"Rockstar" "Psycho" "Sunflower" "Circles"
The Weeknd	4	"Can't Feel My Face" "The Hills" "Starboy" "Heartless"
Eminem	3	"Not Afraid" "Love the Way You Lie" "The Monster"
Kesha	3	"Tik Tok" "We R Who We R" "Timber"
Maroon 5	3	"Moves like Jagger" "One More Night" "Girls Like You"
Cardi B	3	"Bodak Yellow" "I Like It" "Girls Like You"

=== Artists by total cumulative weeks at number-one ===
The following artists were featured at the top of the Hot 100 for the highest cumulative number of weeks during the 2010s. Some totals include in part or in whole weeks spent at number one as part of a collaboration.

Artist	Weeks at number one	Singles
Drake	49	"What's My Name?" (1 week) "Work" (9 weeks) "One Dance" (10 weeks) "God's Plan" (11 weeks) "Nice for What" (8 weeks) "In My Feelings" (10 weeks)
Rihanna	41	"Rude Boy" (5 weeks) "Love the Way You Lie" (7 weeks) "What's My Name?" (1 week) "Only Girl (In the World)" (1 week) "S&M" (1 week) "We Found Love" (10 weeks) "Diamonds" (3 weeks) "The Monster" (4 weeks) "Work" (9 weeks)
Bruno Mars	32	"Nothin' on You" (2 weeks) "Just the Way You Are" (4 weeks) "Grenade" (4 weeks) "Locked Out of Heaven" (6 weeks) "When I Was Your Man" (1 week) "Uptown Funk" (14 weeks) "That's What I Like" (1 week)
Katy Perry	26	"California Gurls" (6 weeks) "Teenage Dream" (2 weeks) "Firework" (4 weeks) "E.T." (5 weeks) "Last Friday Night (T.G.I.F.)" (2 weeks) "Part of Me" (1 week) "Roar" (2 weeks) "Dark Horse" (4 weeks)
Adele	24	"Rolling in the Deep" (7 weeks) "Someone Like You" (5 weeks) "Set Fire to the Rain" (2 weeks) "Hello" (10 weeks)
Justin Bieber	23	"What Do You Mean?" (1 week) "Sorry" (3 weeks) "Love Yourself" (2 weeks) "I'm the One" (1 week) "Despacito" (16 weeks)
Pharrell Williams	22	"Blurred Lines" (12 weeks) "Happy" (10 weeks)
Maroon 5	20	"Moves Like Jagger" (4 weeks) "One More Night" (9 weeks) "Girls Like You" (7 weeks)
Lil Nas X	19	"Old Town Road" (19 weeks)
Taylor Swift	18	"We Are Never Ever Getting Back Together" (3 weeks) "Shake It Off" (4 weeks) "Blank Space" (7 weeks) "Bad Blood" (1 week) "Look What You Made Me Do" (3 weeks)
Ed Sheeran	18	"Shape of You" (12 weeks) "Perfect" (6 weeks)
Billy Ray Cyrus	18	"Old Town Road" (18 weeks)

=== Songs by total number of weeks at number one ===
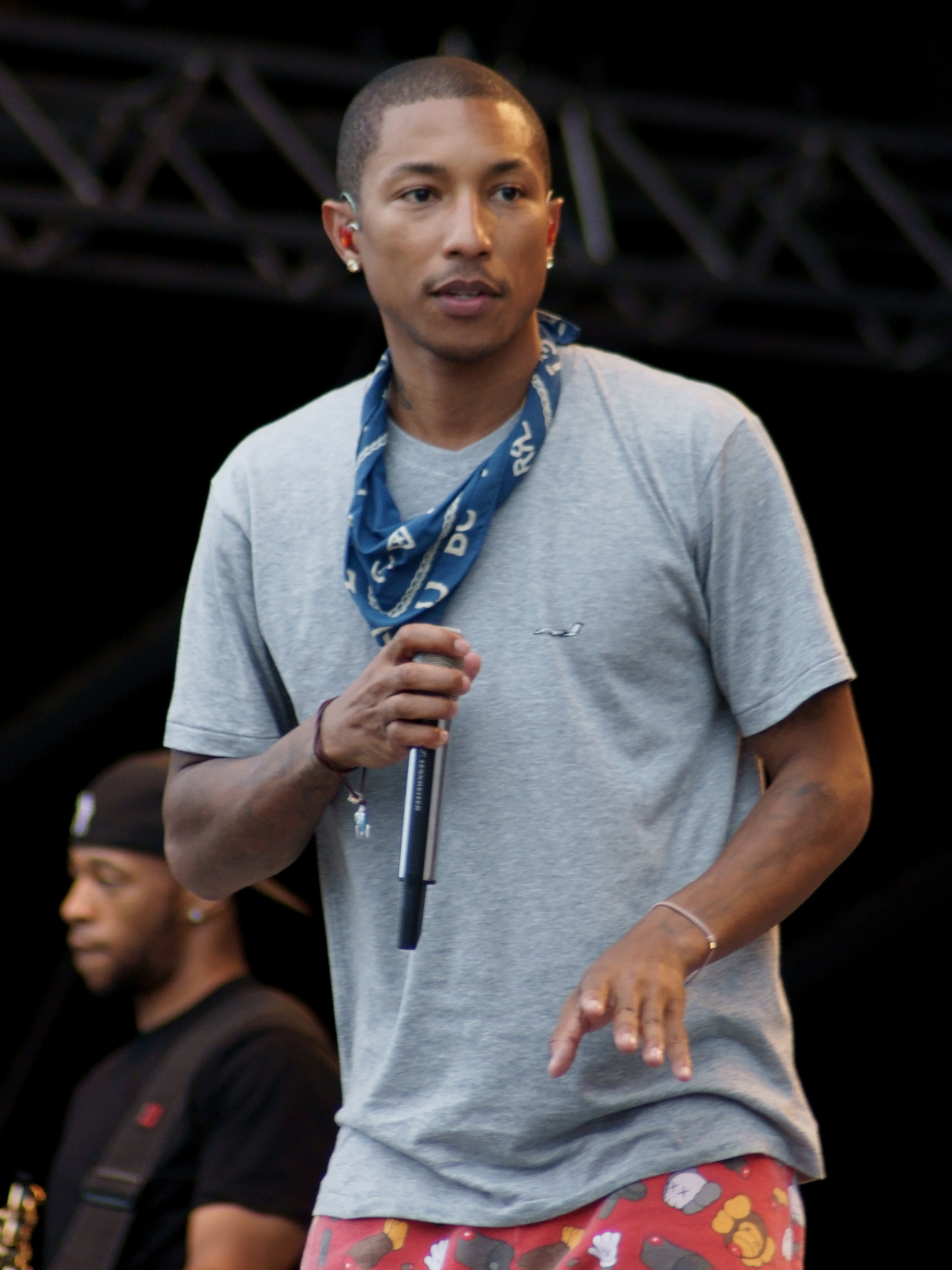
Pharrell Williams became the first artist in the decade to have two songs spent at least 10 weeks apiece on top with "Blurred Lines" and "Happy".

The following songs were featured at the top of the Hot 100 for the highest number of weeks during the 2010s.

Song	Artist(s)	Weeks at number one	References
"Old Town Road"	Lil Nas X featuring Billy Ray Cyrus	19	
"Despacito"	Luis Fonsi and Daddy Yankee featuring Justin Bieber	16	
"Uptown Funk"	Mark Ronson featuring Bruno Mars	14	
"Blurred Lines"	Robin Thicke featuring T.I. and Pharrell Williams	12	
"See You Again"	Wiz Khalifa featuring Charlie Puth	12	
"Closer"	The Chainsmokers featuring Halsey	12	
"Shape of You"	Ed Sheeran	12	
"God's Plan"	Drake	11	
"We Found Love"	Rihanna featuring Calvin Harris	10	
"Happy"	Pharrell Williams	10	
"Hello"	Adele	10	
"One Dance"	Drake featuring Wizkid and Kyla	10	
"In My Feelings"	Drake	10	

== See also ==
- List of Billboard number-one singles
- 2010s in music
- List of UK Singles Chart number ones of the 2010s
- List of Billboard Hot 100 number-one singles of the 2020s
