= List of Billboard Hot 100 number ones of 2011 =

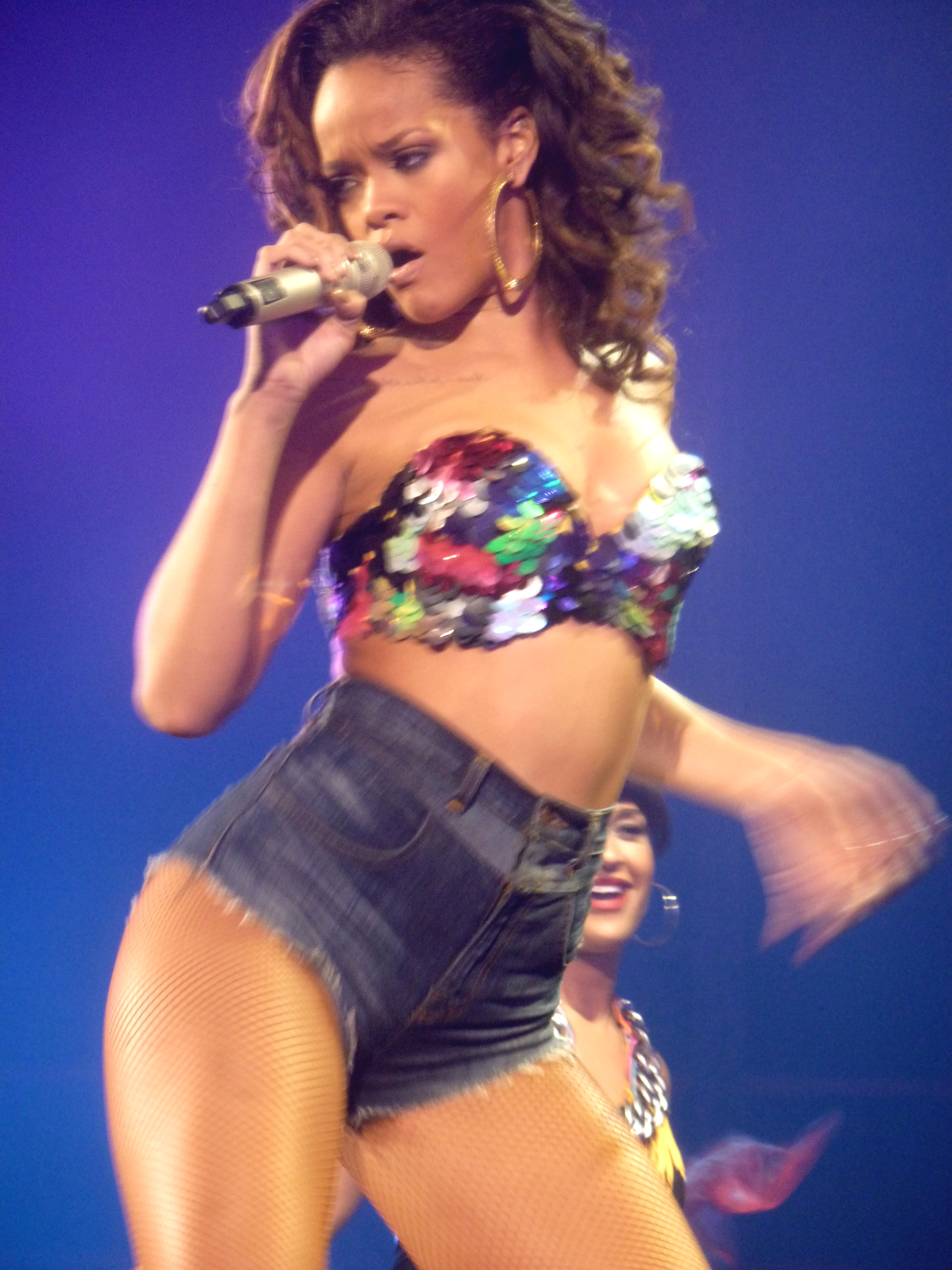
Barbadian singer Rihanna earned her tenth and eleventh number-one singles when "S&M" and "We Found Love" both topped the chart.

The Billboard Hot 100 is a chart that ranks the best-performing songs of the United States. Its data, published by Billboard magazine and compiled by Nielsen SoundScan, is based collectively on each single's weekly physical and digital sales, as well as airplay. In 2011, 14 singles claimed the top spot in 53 issues of the magazine, one of which, singer Katy Perry's "Firework" started its peak position in late 2010.

In 2011, nine acts achieved their first US number-one single, either as a lead artist or a featured guest: Wiz Khalifa, Adele, Pitbull, Afrojack, Nayer, LMFAO, Lauren Bennett, GoonRock and Calvin Harris. Six collaboration singles topped the chart. Pop singers Adele, Britney Spears, Katy Perry and Rihanna each earned two number-one songs during the year.^{[a]} One of Adele's songs, "Rolling in the Deep", was the best-performing single of 2011, topping the Billboard Year-End Hot 100. She became the fourth solo female to have multiple songs spend at least five weeks each at number one in one calendar year.

Rihanna's "We Found Love" was the longest-running single of the year, having topped the chart for eight consecutive weeks in 2011 and two additional weeks in 2012. It became only the eleventh single by a female solo artist to have spent at least ten weeks at number-one in the chart's history. Adele's "Rolling In the Deep" stayed at number one for seven consecutive weeks, while Lady Gaga's "Born This Way"—the 1,000th number-one single of the Hot 100—and LMFAO's "Party Rock Anthem" topped the chart for six consecutive weeks. Perry's "E.T." and Adele's "Someone Like You" each spent five weeks at the number-one spot.

== Chart history ==
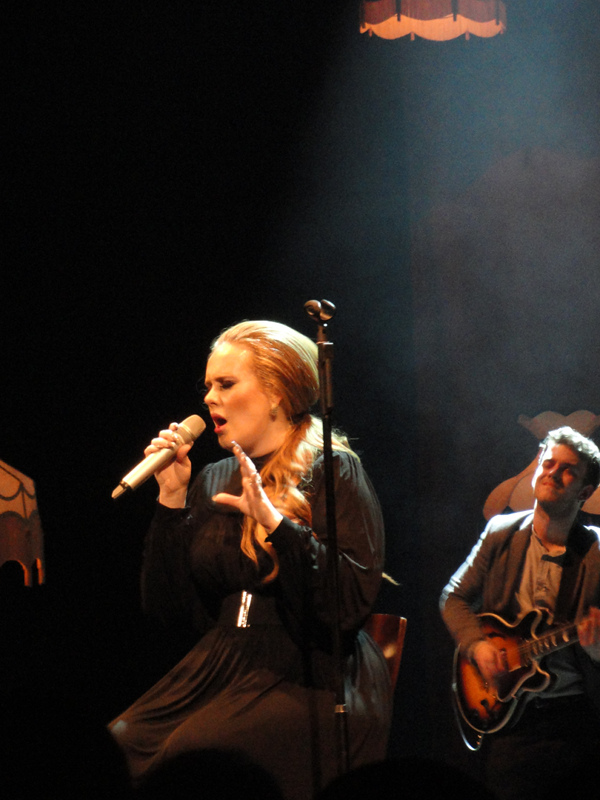
Singer Adele's "Rolling in the Deep" topped the chart for seven consecutive weeks and over the course of the year became the best-performing single of 2011.

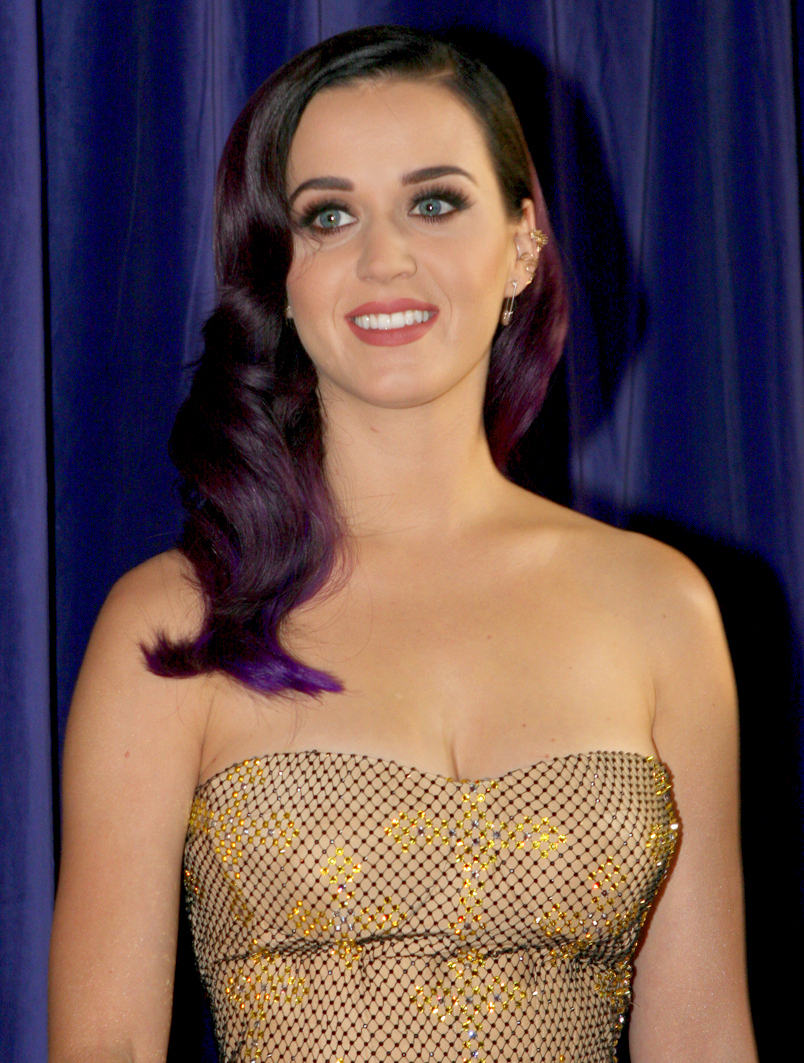
With "E.T." and "Last Friday Night (T.G.I.F.)", Katy Perry became the first female artist in history to have five number-one singles from one album.

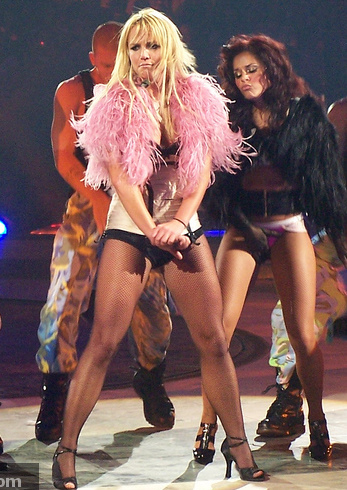
Britney Spears became the first female artist to score number-one singles in the 1990s, 2000s, and 2010s when "Hold It Against Me" debuted in the top position.

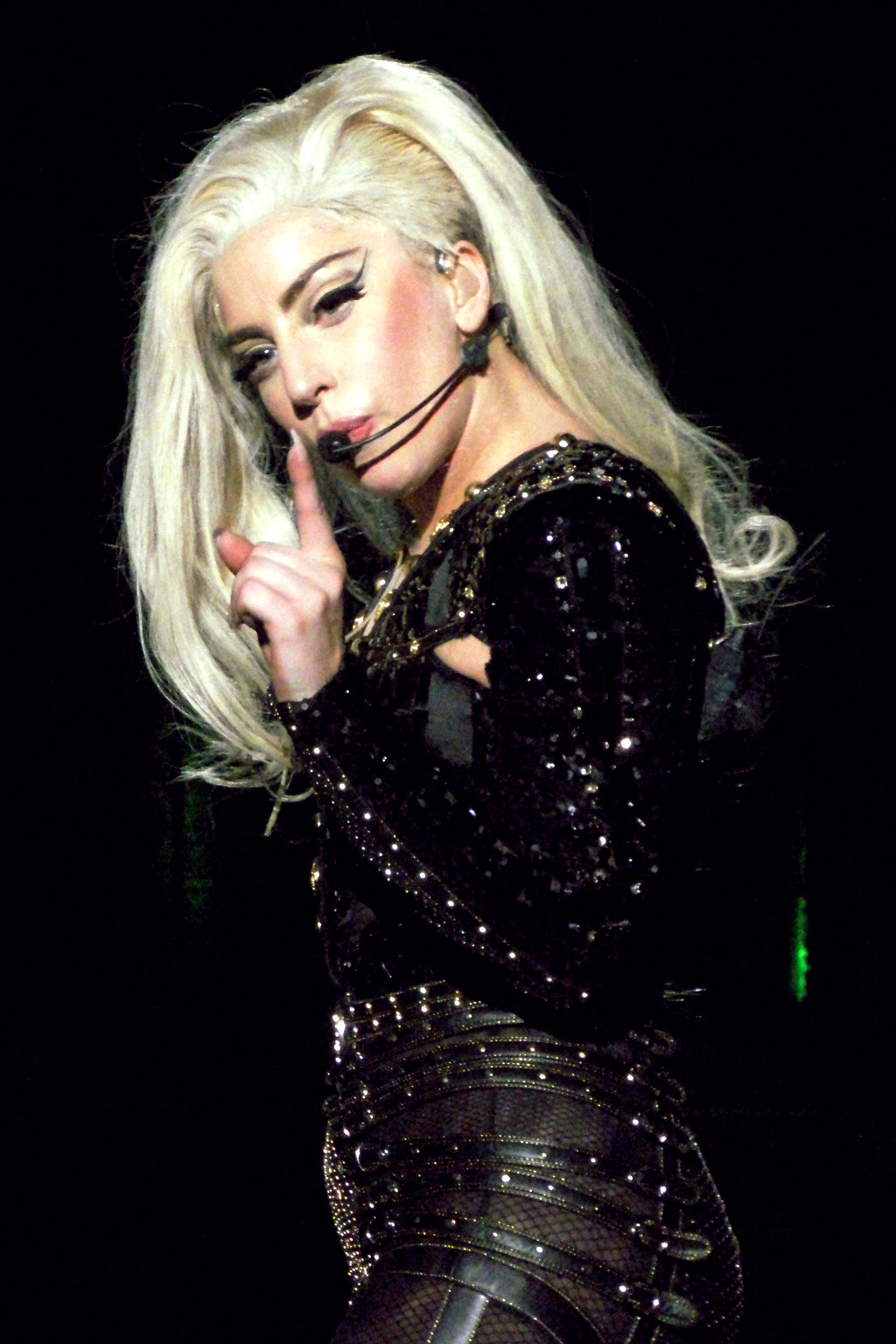
Lady Gaga's "Born This Way" debuted and stayed No. 1 for six consecutive weeks.

Key
†	Indicates best-performing single of 2011

No.	Issue date	Song	Artist(s)	Ref.
996	January 1	"Firework"	Katy Perry	
997	January 8	"Grenade"	Bruno Mars	
re	January 15	"Firework"	Katy Perry	
re	January 22	"Grenade"	Bruno Mars	
998	January 29	"Hold It Against Me"	Britney Spears	
re	February 5	"Grenade"	Bruno Mars	
re	February 12	"Grenade"	Bruno Mars	
999	February 19	"Black and Yellow"	Wiz Khalifa	
1000	February 26	"Born This Way"	Lady Gaga	
1000	March 5	"Born This Way"	Lady Gaga	
1000	March 12	"Born This Way"	Lady Gaga	
1000	March 19	"Born This Way"	Lady Gaga	
1000	March 26	"Born This Way"	Lady Gaga	
1000	April 2	"Born This Way"	Lady Gaga	
1001	April 9	"E.T."	Katy Perry featuring Kanye West	
1001	April 16	"E.T."	Katy Perry featuring Kanye West	
1001	April 23	"E.T."	Katy Perry featuring Kanye West	
1002	April 30	"S&M"	Rihanna featuring Britney Spears	
re	May 7	"E.T."	Katy Perry featuring Kanye West	
re	May 14	"E.T."	Katy Perry featuring Kanye West	
1003	May 21	"Rolling in the Deep"†	Adele	
1003	May 28	"Rolling in the Deep"†	Adele	
1003	June 4	"Rolling in the Deep"†	Adele	
1003	June 11	"Rolling in the Deep"†	Adele	
1003	June 18	"Rolling in the Deep"†	Adele	
1003	June 25	"Rolling in the Deep"†	Adele	
1003	July 2	"Rolling in the Deep"†	Adele	
1004	July 9	"Give Me Everything"	Pitbull featuring Ne-Yo, Afrojack and Nayer	
1005	July 16	"Party Rock Anthem"	LMFAO featuring Lauren Bennett and GoonRock	
1005	July 23	"Party Rock Anthem"	LMFAO featuring Lauren Bennett and GoonRock	
1005	July 30	"Party Rock Anthem"	LMFAO featuring Lauren Bennett and GoonRock	
1005	August 6	"Party Rock Anthem"	LMFAO featuring Lauren Bennett and GoonRock	
1005	August 13	"Party Rock Anthem"	LMFAO featuring Lauren Bennett and GoonRock	
1005	August 20	"Party Rock Anthem"	LMFAO featuring Lauren Bennett and GoonRock	
1006	August 27	"Last Friday Night (T.G.I.F.)"	Katy Perry	
1006	September 3	"Last Friday Night (T.G.I.F.)"	Katy Perry	
1007	September 10	"Moves Like Jagger"	Maroon 5 featuring Christina Aguilera	
1008	September 17	"Someone Like You"	Adele	
re	September 24	"Moves Like Jagger"	Maroon 5 featuring Christina Aguilera	
re	October 1	"Moves Like Jagger"	Maroon 5 featuring Christina Aguilera	
re	October 8	"Moves Like Jagger"	Maroon 5 featuring Christina Aguilera	
re	October 15	"Someone Like You"	Adele	
re	October 22	"Someone Like You"	Adele	
re	October 29	"Someone Like You"	Adele	
re	November 5	"Someone Like You"	Adele	
1009	November 12	"We Found Love"	Rihanna featuring Calvin Harris	
1009	November 19	"We Found Love"	Rihanna featuring Calvin Harris	
1009	November 26	"We Found Love"	Rihanna featuring Calvin Harris	
1009	December 3	"We Found Love"	Rihanna featuring Calvin Harris	
1009	December 10	"We Found Love"	Rihanna featuring Calvin Harris	
1009	December 17	"We Found Love"	Rihanna featuring Calvin Harris	
1009	December 24	"We Found Love"	Rihanna featuring Calvin Harris	
1009	December 31	"We Found Love"	Rihanna featuring Calvin Harris	

== Number-one artists ==
List of number-one artists by total weeks at number one
Position	Artist	Weeks at No. 1
1	Adele	12
2	Katy Perry	9
2	Rihanna	9
4	Calvin Harris	8
5	Lady Gaga	6
5	LMFAO	6
5	Lauren Bennett	6
5	Goonrock	6
9	Kanye West	5
10	Bruno Mars	4
10	Maroon 5	4
10	Christina Aguilera	4
13	Britney Spears	2
14	Wiz Khalifa	1
14	Pitbull	1
14	Ne-Yo	1
14	Afrojack	1
14	Nayer	1

== See also ==
- 2011 in music
- List of Billboard Hot 100 top-ten singles in 2011
- List of Billboard Hot 100 number-one singles of the 2010s

== Notes ==
- Perry had three number-one singles on the chart in 2011. However, "Firework" is excluded from the count, because it previously topped the chart in 2010.
