= List of Billboard Hot 100 top-ten singles in 2011 =

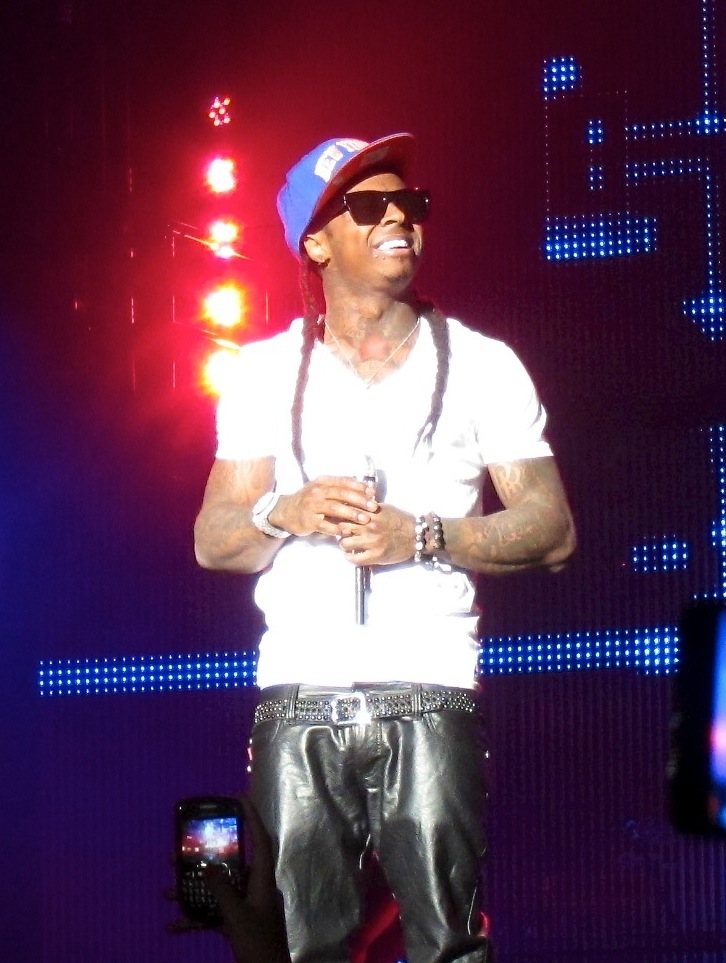
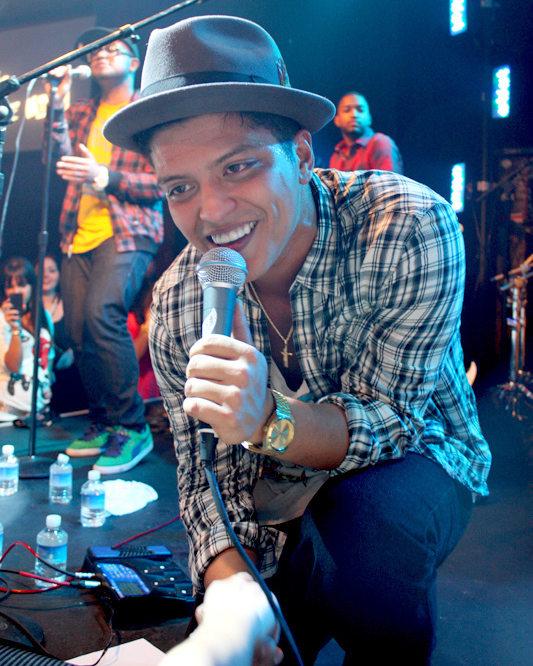
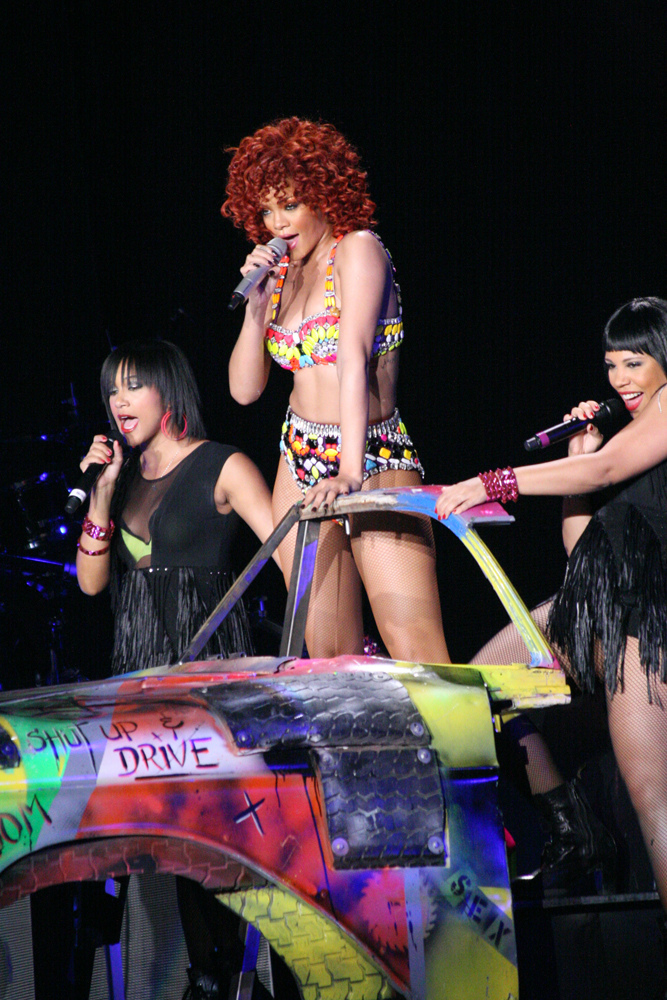
Lil Wayne, Bruno Mars, and Rihanna (pictured in order) tied for the most top-ten singles in 2011 with six each. Mars's "Grenade" had a four-week run at number one on the Hot 100 and ranked number six on Billboard's year-end Hot 100 list. Rihanna became the fastest solo artist to collect twenty top-ten hits when her single "We Found Love" (featuring Calvin Harris) entered the top ten six years and four months after she first appeared on the Hot 100. The song, as well as her single "S&M" (featuring Britney Spears), climbed to number one on the chart, "S&M" logging one week at the top and "We Found Love" logging ten weeks, including two in 2012.

Seventy-one singles made into top 10 of the Hot 100, the all-genre Billboard singles charts, in 2011. Sixty-eight acts had a top-ten hit during the year, with twenty achieving their first either as a lead or featured artist. Lil Wayne, Bruno Mars, and Rihanna each had six top-ten hits in 2011, tying them for the most top-ten hits during the year. LMFAO's "Party Rock Anthem" (featuring Lauren Bennett and GoonRock) had a twenty-six-week run in the top ten, the longest during the year and tying with Savage Garden's "Truly Madly Deeply" as the fourth-longest in Billboard history. In the beginning of 2012, the song re-entered the top ten, extending its run to twenty-nine weeks and becoming the fourth-longest-running top-ten single ever behind "How Do I Live" by LeAnn Rimes, "Smooth" by Santana featuring Rob Thomas and "Uptown Funk" by Mark Ronson featuring Bruno Mars, also bumping Jewel's You Were Meant For Me/Foolish Games down to fifth, with 28 weeks.

On the week ending April 30, 2011, singer Katy Perry extended her top ten streak beginning the previous year to forty-nine weeks, breaking a record held by Swedish pop band Ace of Base for seventeen years. Perry went on to log twenty more consecutive weeks in the top ten, extending her record to sixty-nine weeks, before "Last Friday Night (T.G.I.F.)" fell out of the top ten on the week ending September 24, 2011, ending her streak.

Rihanna attained her twentieth top-ten hit when "We Found Love" (featuring Calvin Harris) climbed into the top ten on the week ending October 15, 2011. This made Rihanna the fastest soloist to attain twenty top-ten hits, having done so in a six-year, four-month span, breaking a record previously held by singer Madonna.

== Top-ten singles ==
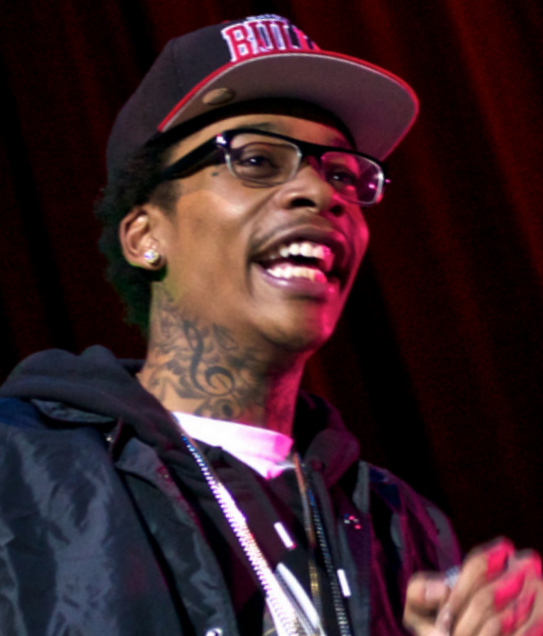
American rapper and singer Wiz Khalifa scored two top-ten singles with "Black and Yellow". The song became his first number-one hit, and ranked number thirty-one on Billboard's year-end Hot 100 list. Meanwhile "No Sleep" which debuted at number 6, would end up being his second top-ten hit

.

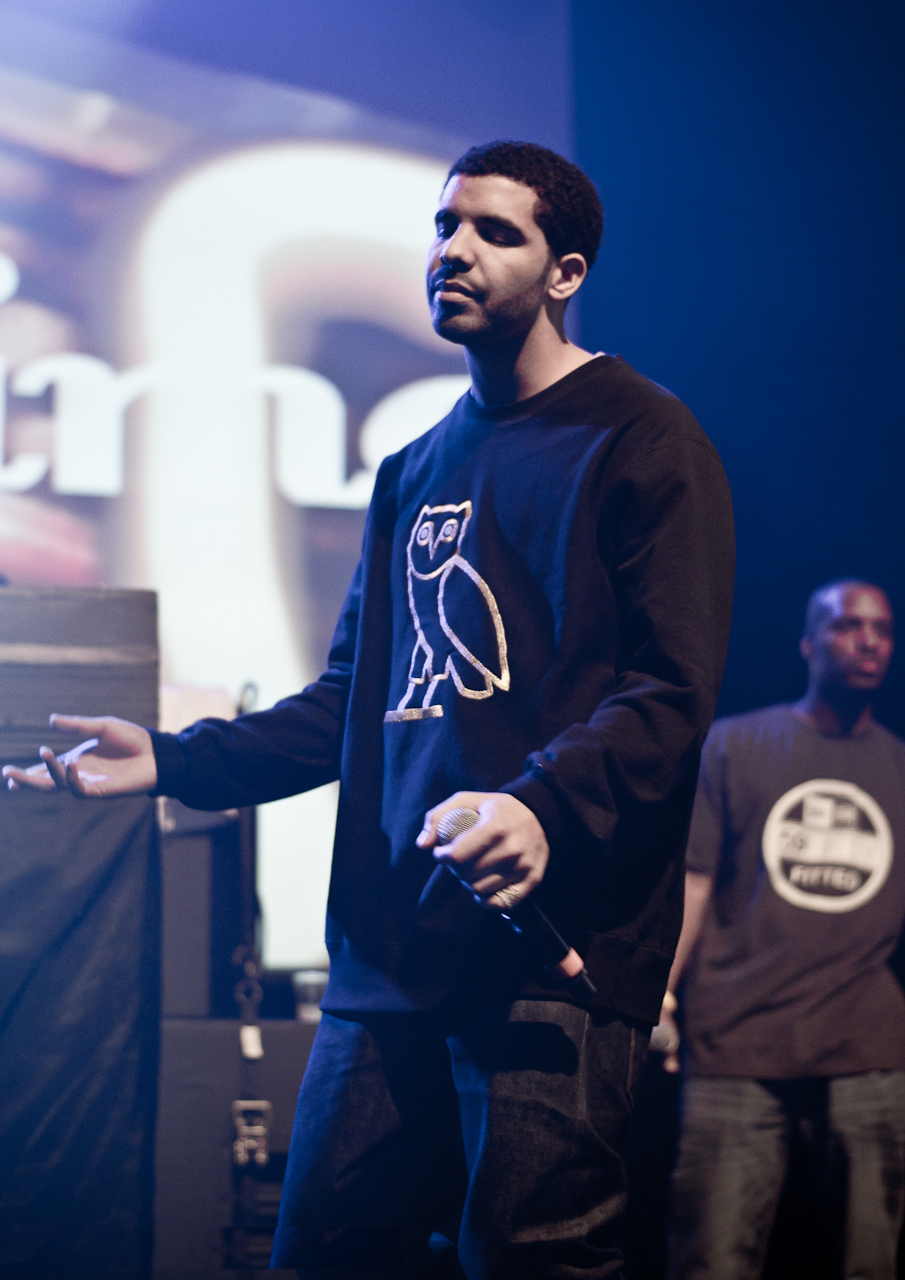
Canadian rapper and singer Drake scored three top-ten singles with his features on "What's My Name?" with Rihanna which charted at number 1, DJ Khaled's "I'm On One" with Lil Wayne and Rick Ross which charted at number 10 and She Will with Lil Wayne which charted at number 3.

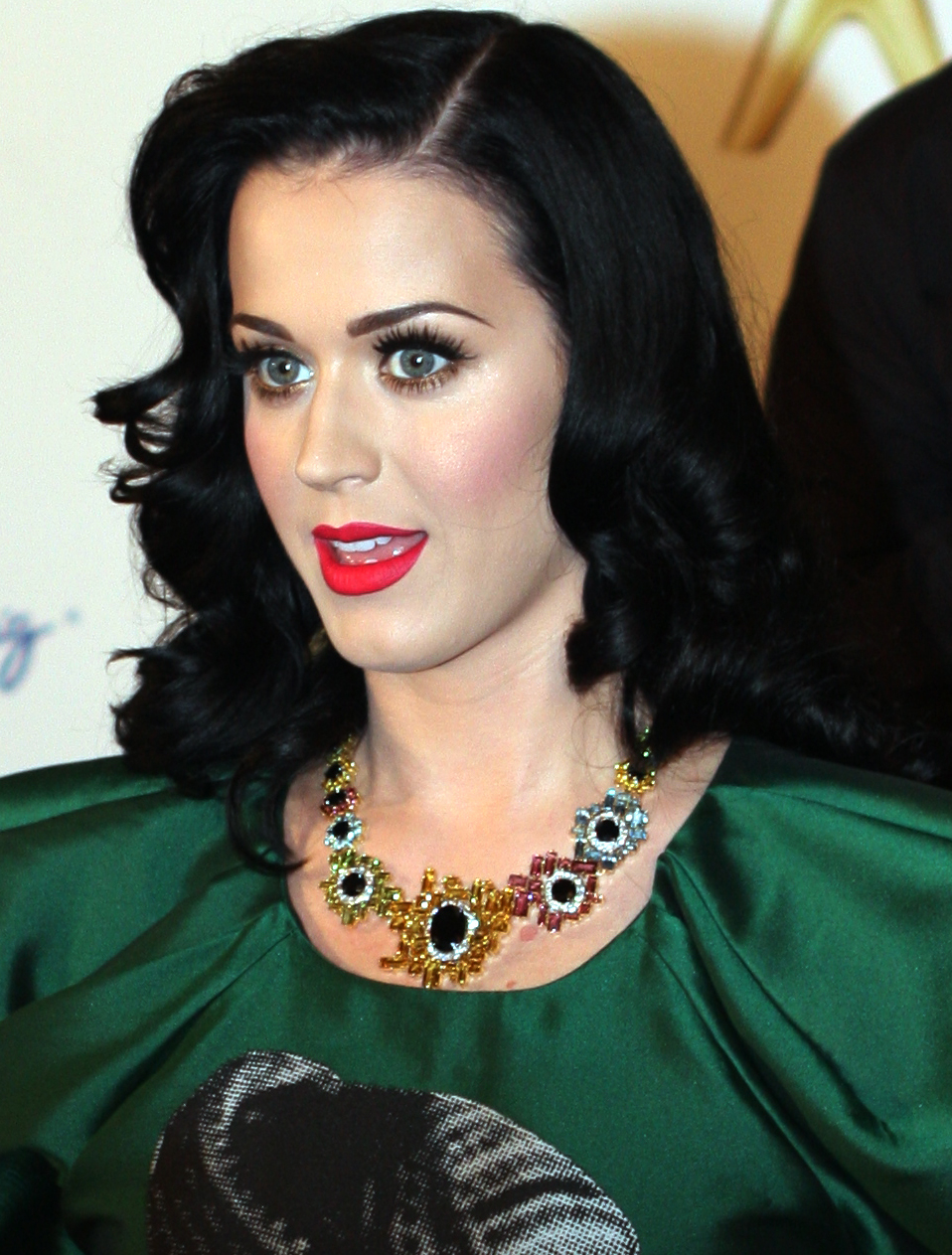
In 2011, singer Katy Perry broke the record for the longest consecutive run in the top ten after logging forty-nine weeks in the tier; later in the year, she went on to extend this record to sixty-nine weeks. Perry scored four top-ten singles during the year, three of which went to number one and two of which, "Firework" and "E.T." (featuring Kanye West), ranked at numbers three and four respectively on Billboard's year-end Hot 100 list.

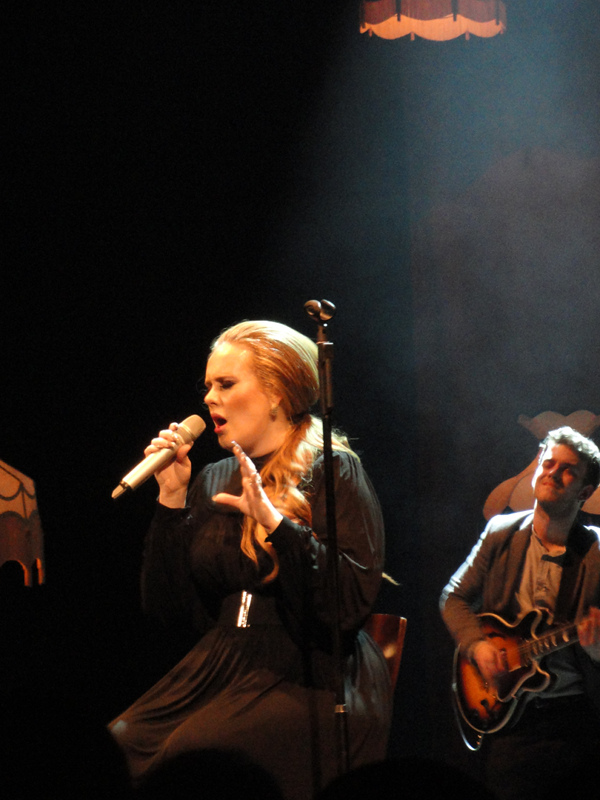
English singer-songwriter Adele achieved her first top-ten single with "Rolling in the Deep", which logged seven weeks at number one and went on to become Billboard's number-one single of the year. She later achieved a second top-ten single with "Someone Like You", which spent five weeks at number one.

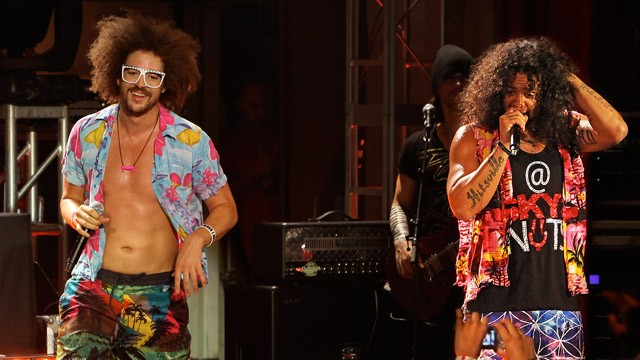
Electropop duo LMFAO had the longest-running top-ten single in 2011 with "Party Rock Anthem" (featuring Lauren Bennett and GoonRock), which remained in the top ten for twenty-six weeks, tying with Savage Garden's "Truly Madly Deeply" for the fourth-longest top ten run for a single in Billboard history. In 2012, the song spent three more weeks in the top ten, extending its run to twenty-nine weeks and becoming the third-longest-running top-ten single ever. The song spent six weeks at number one and became Billboard's number-two single of 2011. LMFAO scored a second top-ten single in 2011 with "Sexy and I Know It", which reached number one in 2012.

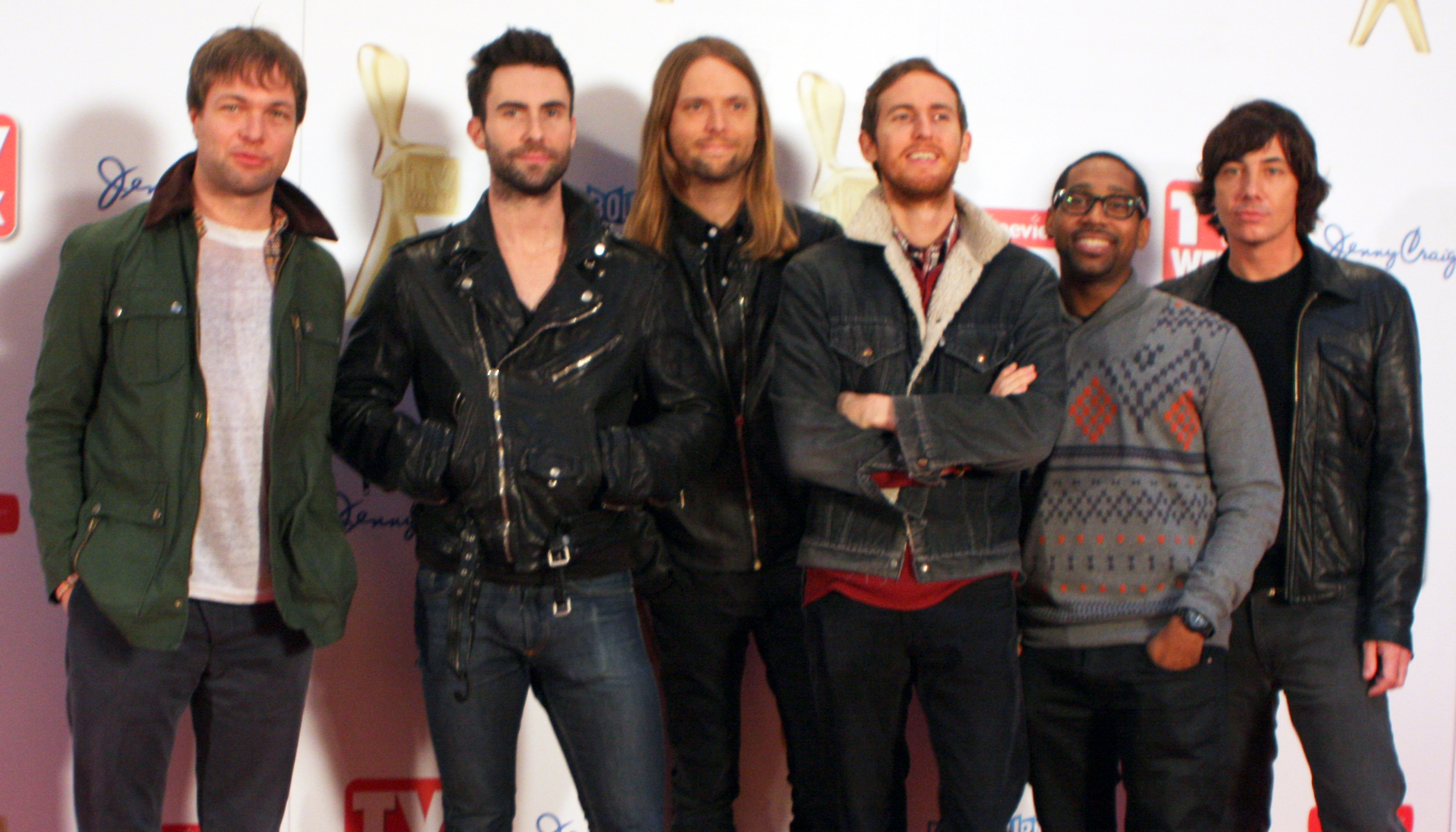
Pop rock band Maroon 5 scored their fourth top-ten single with "Moves Like Jagger" (featuring Christina Aguilera). The song became the band's second number-one hit, remaining at the Hot 100 summit for four weeks, and ranked number nine on Billboard's year-end Hot 100 list.

Key

- ↑ – indicates single's top 10 entry was also its Hot 100 debut
- † – indicates best performing song of the year
- (#) – 2011 year-end top 10 single position and rank

List of Billboard Hot 100 top ten singles which peaked in 2011
Top ten entry date	Single	Artist(s)	Peak	Peak date	Weeks in top ten
Singles from 2010
December 4	"Fuck You (Forget You)" (#7) ^{[D]}	Cee Lo Green	2	March 5	12
December 11	"Grenade" (#6)	Bruno Mars	1	January 8	17
Singles from 2011
January 1	"6 Foot 7 Foot" ↑	Lil Wayne featuring Cory Gunz	9	January 1	1
January 8	"Black and Yellow"	Wiz Khalifa	1	February 19	9
January 8	"Tonight (I'm Fuckin'/Lovin' You)"	Enrique Iglesias featuring Ludacris and DJ Frank E	4	February 5	12
January 29	"Hold It Against Me" ↑	Britney Spears	1	January 29	5
February 5	"Hey Baby (Drop It to the Floor)"	Pitbull featuring T-Pain	7	February 12	3
February 12	"Fuckin' Perfect"	Pink	2	February 12	10
February 12	"Rocketeer"	Far East Movement featuring Ryan Tedder	7	February 19	2
February 19	"I Need a Doctor" ↑^{[E]}	Dr. Dre featuring Eminem and Skylar Grey	4	March 5	3
February 26	"Born This Way" ↑	Lady Gaga	1	February 26	9
February 26	"S&M"	Rihanna^{1}	1	April 30	13
March 5	"Never Say Never"	Justin Bieber featuring Jaden Smith	8	March 5	1
March 12	"On the Floor" ↑^{[F]}	Jennifer Lopez featuring Pitbull	3	May 21	15
March 12	"E.T." (#4)	Katy Perry featuring Kanye West	1	April 9	20
March 19	"Blow"^{[H]}	Kesha	7	March 19	4
March 26	"Till the World Ends"^{[G]}^{[I]}	Britney Spears^{2}	3	May 14	9
April 2	"Loser like Me" ↑	Glee cast	6	April 2	1
April 2	"Down on Me"^{[J]}	Jeremih featuring 50 Cent	4	April 30	8
April 2	"Just Can't Get Enough" (#10)	The Black Eyed Peas	3	April 16	13
April 2	"Look at Me Now"	Chris Brown featuring Lil Wayne and Busta Rhymes	6	April 16	10
April 9	"No Sleep" ↑	Wiz Khalifa	6	April 9	1
April 16	"Rolling in the Deep" † (#1)	Adele	1	May 21	20
April 30	"Judas" ↑	Lady Gaga	10	April 30	1
May 7	"The Lazy Song"	Bruno Mars	4	June 18	10
May 21	"Just a Kiss" ↑	Lady Antebellum	7	May 21	1
May 21	"Give Me Everything" (#5) ^{[P]}	Pitbull featuring Ne-Yo, Afrojack and Nayer	1	July 9	17
May 28	"The Edge of Glory" ↑^{[K]}	Lady Gaga	3	May 28	11
June 4	"Party Rock Anthem" (#2) ^{[T]}	LMFAO featuring Lauren Bennett and GoonRock	1	July 16	29
June 4	"The Show Goes On"^{[L]}^{[M]}	Lupe Fiasco	9	June 4	3
June 11	"I'm on One"	DJ Khaled featuring Drake, Rick Ross and Lil Wayne	10	June 11	1
June 25	"Dirt Road Anthem"	Jason Aldean^{3}	7	July 2	2
June 25	"Super Bass" (#8)	Nicki Minaj	3	August 13	15
July 2	"Last Friday Night (T.G.I.F.)"	Katy Perry	1	August 27	12
July 9	"Moves like Jagger" (#9) ↑^{[N]}	Maroon 5 featuring Christina Aguilera	1	September 10	21
July 9	"How to Love"^{[Q]}	Lil Wayne	5	August 13	11
July 16	"Good Life"^{[O]}	OneRepublic	8	July 23	7
July 16	"Tonight Tonight"	Hot Chelle Rae	7	August 6	6
July 30	"Skyscraper" ↑	Demi Lovato	10	July 30	1
August 6	"Lighters"	Bad Meets Evil featuring Bruno Mars	4	September 10	10
August 13	"I Wanna Go"	Britney Spears	7	August 20	4
August 27	"Pumped Up Kicks"	Foster the People	3	September 10	14
September 3	"She Will" ↑	Lil Wayne featuring Drake	3	September 3	1
September 10	"Stereo Hearts"^{[Q]}	Gym Class Heroes featuring Adam Levine	4	October 15	15
September 17	"Someone like You"	Adele	1	September 17	20
September 17	"Yoü and I"^{[S]}	Lady Gaga	6	September 17	5
September 17	"You Make Me Feel…"^{[R]}	Cobra Starship featuring Sabi	7	October 1	9
September 24	"Cheers (Drink to That)"	Rihanna	7	October 8	3
October 15	"Strange Clouds" ↑	B.o.B featuring Lil Wayne	7	October 15	1
October 15	"We Found Love"	Rihanna featuring Calvin Harris	1	November 12	23
October 15	"Without You"	David Guetta featuring Usher	4	November 26	12
November 5	"Make Me Proud"	Drake featuring Nicki Minaj	9	November 5	1
November 12	"Mr. Know It All"	Kelly Clarkson	10	November 12	1
November 26	"If This Was a Movie" ↑	Taylor Swift	10	November 26	1
November 26	"It Will Rain"	Bruno Mars	3	December 10	13
December 24	"5 O'Clock"	T-Pain featuring Wiz Khalifa and Lily Allen	10	December 24	2

Notes:

^{1} Britney Spears was credited as a featured artist on the week ending April 30, 2011.
^{2} Nicki Minaj and Kesha were credited as featured artists on the week ending May 14, 2011.
^{3} Ludacris was credited as a featured artist on the week ending July 2, 2011.

=== 2010 peaks ===
List of Billboard Hot 100 top ten singles in 2011 which peaked in 2010
Top ten entry date	Single	Artist(s)	Peak	Peak date	Weeks in top ten
September 4	"Just the Way You Are"	Bruno Mars	1	October 2	22
September 18	"Just a Dream"^{[B]}	Nelly	3	October 23	17
October 2	"Only Girl (In the World)"^{[C]}	Rihanna	1	December 4	15
October 30	"Bottoms Up"^{[A]}	Trey Songz featuring Nicki Minaj	6	November 6	9
November 6	"Raise Your Glass"	Pink	1	December 11	14
November 13	"We R Who We R" ↑	Kesha	1	November 13	14
November 20	"Firework" (#3)	Katy Perry	1	December 18	18
November 20	"What's My Name?"	Rihanna featuring Drake	1	November 20	14
December 11	"The Time (Dirty Bit)"^{[D]}	The Black Eyed Peas	4	December 18	10

=== 2012 peaks ===
List of Billboard Hot 100 top ten singles in 2011 which peaked in 2012
Top ten entry date	Single	Artist(s)	Peak	Peak date	Weeks in top ten
October 8	"Sexy and I Know It"	LMFAO	1	January 7	21
October 29	"Young, Wild & Free" ↑	Snoop Dogg and Wiz Khalifa featuring Bruno Mars	7	March 17	6
November 19	"Good Feeling"	Flo Rida	3	January 28	16
December 3	"Take Care" ↑	Drake featuring Rihanna	7	March 24	4
December 3	"The One That Got Away"	Katy Perry	3	January 7	11
December 17	"Niggas in Paris"	Jay-Z and Kanye West	5	January 7	8

== Notes ==
^{A} The single re-entered the top ten on the week ending January 8, 2011.
^{B} The single re-entered the top ten on the week ending January 15, 2011.
^{C} The single re-entered the top ten on the week ending January 22, 2011.
^{D} The single re-entered the top ten on the week ending February 26, 2011.
^{E} The single re-entered the top ten on the week ending March 5, 2011.
^{F} The single re-entered the top ten on the week ending April 9, 2011.
^{G} The single re-entered the top ten on the week ending April 23, 2011.
^{H} The single re-entered the top ten on the week ending May 7, 2011.
^{I} The single re-entered the top ten on the week ending May 14, 2011.
^{J} The single re-entered the top ten on the week ending May 28, 2011.
^{K} The single re-entered the top ten on the week ending June 11, 2011.
^{L} The single re-entered the top ten on the week ending June 18, 2011.
^{M} The single re-entered the top ten on the week ending July 2, 2011.
^{N} The single re-entered the top ten on the week ending August 20, 2011.
^{O} The single re-entered the top ten on the week ending August 27, 2011.
^{P} The single re-entered the top ten on the week ending September 10, 2011.
^{Q} The single re-entered the top ten on the week ending September 24, 2011.
^{R} The single re-entered the top ten on the week ending October 1, 2011.
^{S} The single re-entered the top ten on the week ending October 22, 2011.
^{T} The single re-entered the top ten on the week ending December 10, 2011.

== Artists with most top-ten songs ==
List of artists by total songs peaking in the top-ten
Artist	Numbers of songs
Nicki Minaj	6
Lil Wayne	6
Rihanna	6
Bruno Mars	6
Drake	5
Katy Perry	4
Lady Gaga	4
Wiz Khalifa	4
Britney Spears	3
Nicki Minaj	3
Pitbull	3
Adele	2
The Black Eyed Peas	2
Kanye West	2
Kesha	2
LMFAO	2
Pink	2
T-Pain	2

== See also ==
- 2011 in American music
- List of Billboard Hot 100 number ones of 2011
- Billboard Year-End Hot 100 singles of 2011
