= Alfred Lorenz =

Alfred Ottokar Lorenz (11 July 1868, Vienna – 20 November 1939, Munich) was an Austrian-German conductor, composer, and musical analyst. His principal work is the four-volume Das Geheimnis der Form bei Richard Wagner, which attempts to comprehensively analyze some of Richard Wagner's best-known operas. Lorenz's work reflects to a great extent his sympathy with Nazi ideology, and has only recently been discredited by scholarship.

== Life ==
Lorenz was born in Oldislobene in 1868. Lorenz's father was Ottokar Lorenz, a historian who studied genealogy. His father's interest in genealogy may have influenced Alfred Lorenz's later interest in race and his eventual involvement with Nazi ideology. In 1885, Lorenz moved to Jena, where he began his legal studies in 1886. Lorenz ended his legal studies in 1889, and began studying music with Robert Radecke and Philipp Spitta in Berlin. Lorenz's career as a conductor and composer lasted until 1920, when he was forced to retire by the Social Democrats. Lorenz then moved to Munich, where he spent the rest of his life as an academic. Lorenz joined the Nazi party in 1931, and remained an active party member until his death in 1939.

== Analytical works ==
=== Das Geheimnis der Form bei Richard Wagner, 1924–1933 ===
Das Geheimnis der Form bei Richard Wagner consists of four volumes, each of which analyzes one of Wagner's operas. The four operas covered by Lorenz are Der Ring des Nibelungen, Tristan und Isolde, Die Meistersinger von Nürnberg, and Parsifal. To analyze these large, dramatic works, Lorenz develops a set of forms, and then proceeds to show in specific detail how Wagner's operas can be divided into these forms. One of Lorenz's forms is the Bar form AAB, which has a historical legacy dating back to medieval poetry. Another of Lorenz's forms is the Bogen form, which in its simple form is ABA.

In his time Lorenz was considered to be the leading expert in Wagnerian form. His formal ideas regarding Wagner's operas were enormously influential; McClatchie suggests that by 1952, Lorenz's formal conception of Wagner's operas was almost "universally accepted." More recently, however, scholars have roundly dismissed Lorenz's on purely analytical grounds, but also with consideration for how Lorenz's association with the Nazi party may pertain to the ideological bias of his work.

== Writings ==
- Das Geheimnis der Form bei Richard Wagner
  - Der musikalische Aufbau des Bühnenfestspieles "Der Ring des Nibelungen" (Berlin, 1924)
  - Der musikalische Aufbau von Richard Wagners "Tristan und Isolde" (Berlin, 1926)
  - Der musikalische Aufbau von Richard Wagners "Die Meistersinger von Nürnberg" (Berlin, 1931)
  - Der musikalische Aufbau von Richard Wagners "Parsifal" (Berlin, 1933)
  - Alessandro Scarlatti's Jugendoper: Ein Beitr. z. Geschichte d. ital. Oper; [2 Bde] (B. Filser, 1927)
