= Billboard Year-End Hot 100 singles of 2011 =

Ranking of recorded music

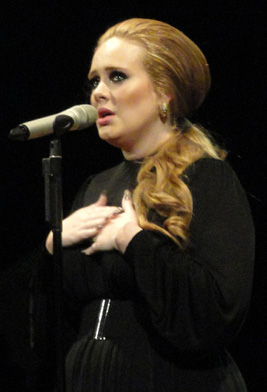
Adele's "Rolling in the Deep" was the number 1 song of the year, topping the Hot 100 for 7 consecutive weeks.

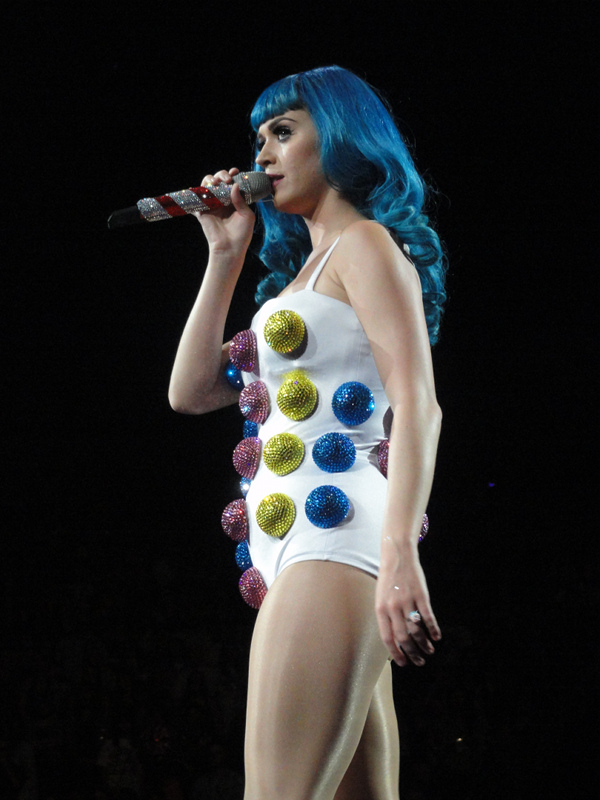
Four of Katy Perry's singles, "Firework", "E.T.", "Last Friday Night (T.G.I.F.)" and "Teenage Dream" managed to enter the list, with "Firework" and "E.T." being numbers 3 and 4 respectively.

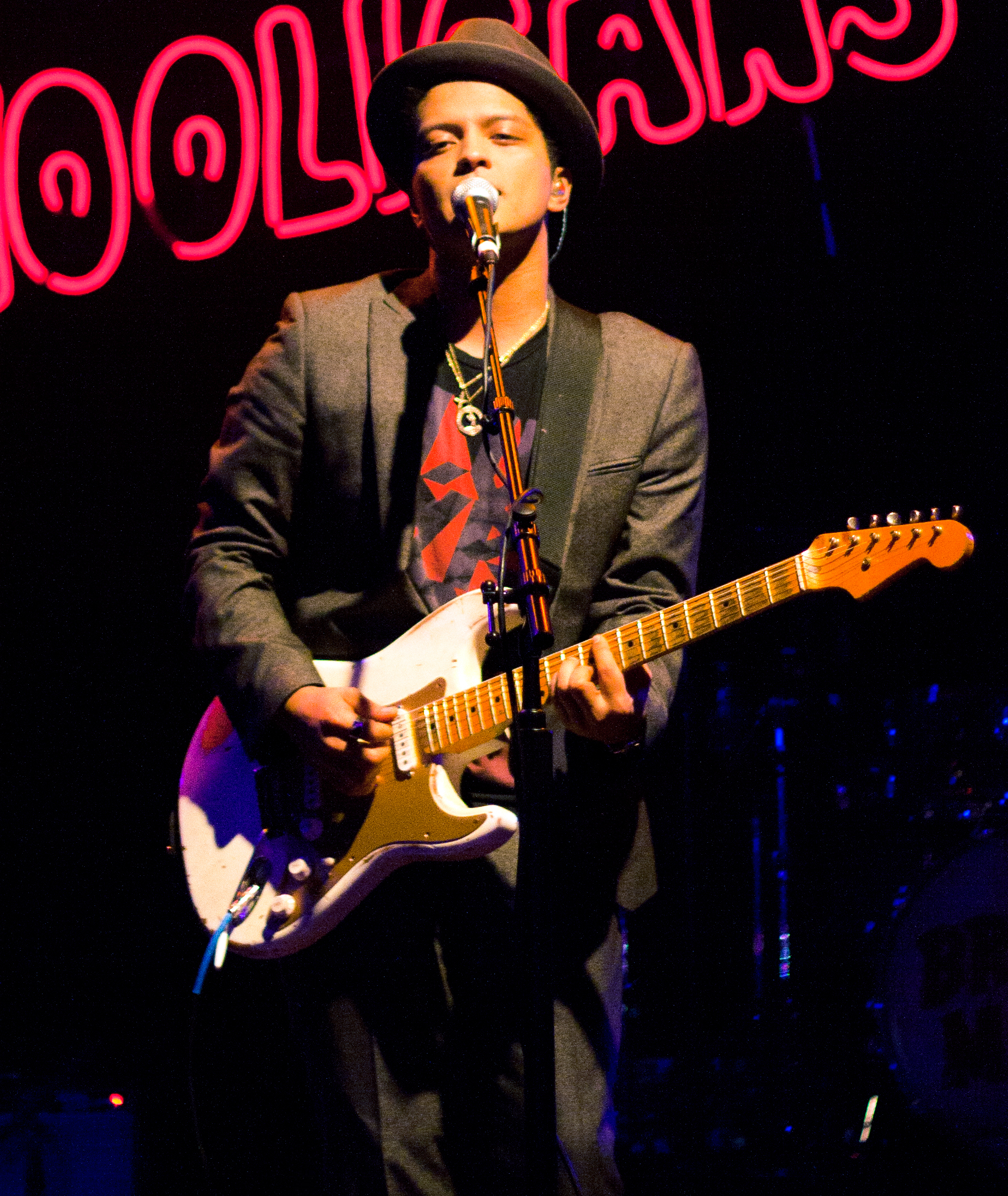
Bruno Mars' single "Just the Way You Are" jumped three spots from the previous year's list, from 18 to 15, but his song "Grenade" topped it at position 6. He also had "The Lazy Song" at 26 and was featured on "Lighters" at 34.

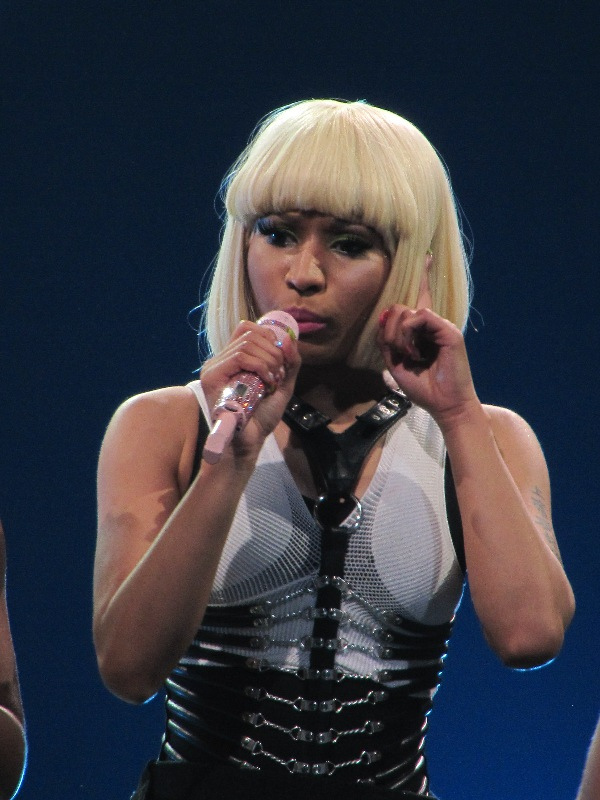
Nicki Minaj's single "Super Bass" was number 8 on the list, as it peaked at number 3 on the Hot 100, she became the first female rapper to hit top 5 since Missy Elliott's song "Lose Control".

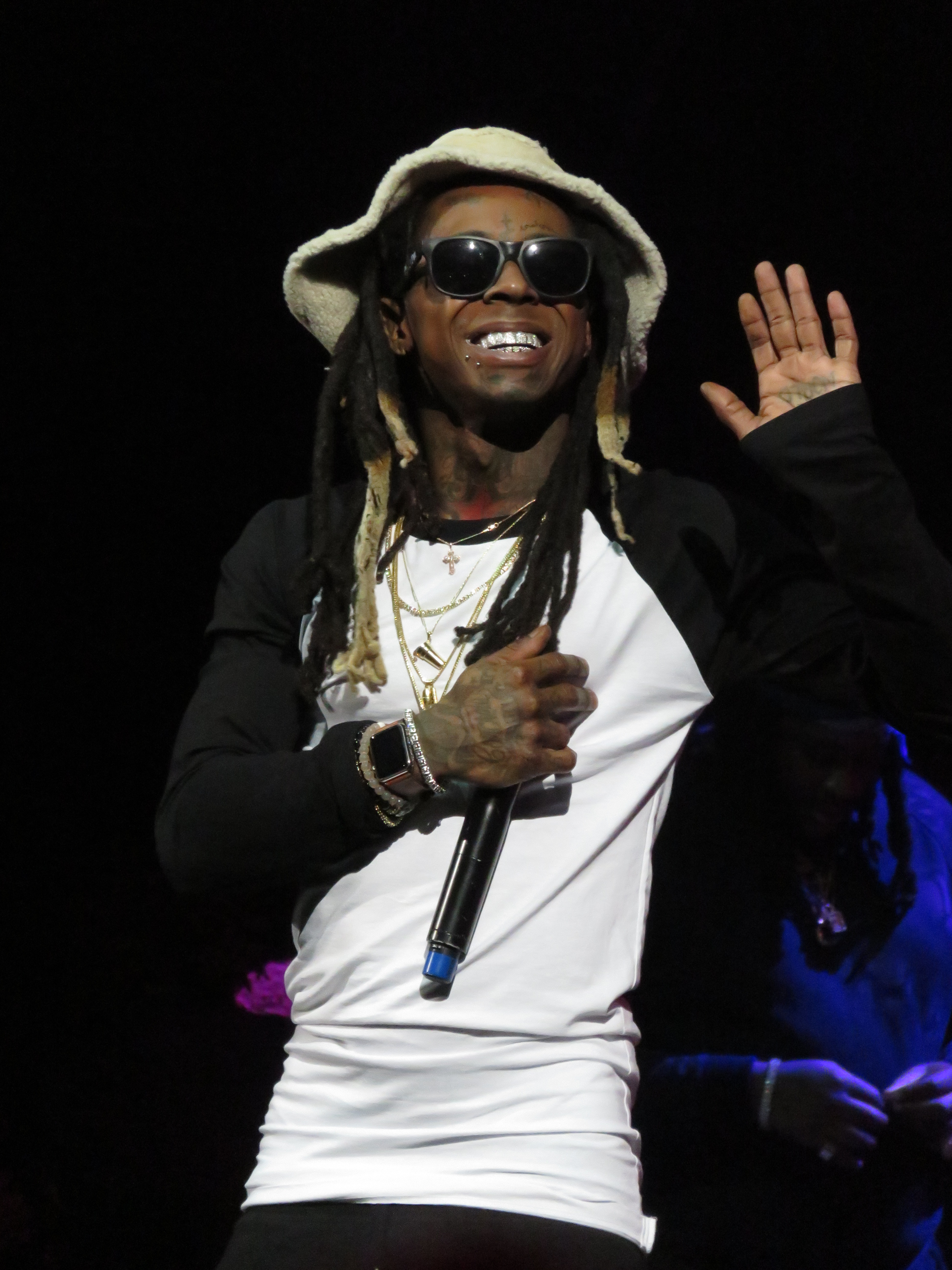
Lil Wayne has the most singles on the list with six including three lead singles from his album, Tha Carter IV, with two singles "How to Love" and "6 Foot 7 Foot", ranking in the Top 50 at numbers 23 and 41 respectively, while "She Will" made it at number 95.

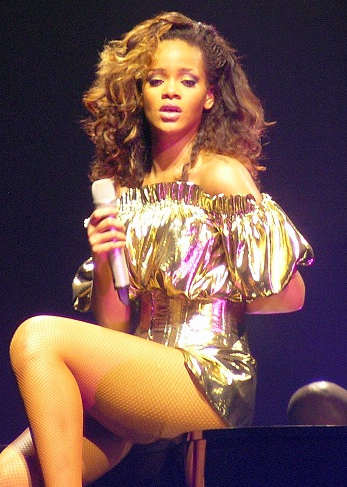
Barbadian singer Rihanna had five songs included on the list, four of which were from her fifth album, Loud, and one from her sixth album, Talk That Talk.

Billboard publishes annual lists of songs based on chart performance over the course of a year based on Nielsen Broadcast Data Systems and SoundScan information. For 2011, the list of the top 100 Billboard Hot 100 Year-End songs was published on December 9, calculated with data from December 4, 2010 to November 26, 2011. At the number one position was Adele's "Rolling in the Deep", which stayed atop the Hot 100 for seven consecutive weeks, and in the top thirty for most of the year.

List of songs on Billboard's 2011 Year-End Hot 100 chart
No.	Title	Artist(s)
1	"Rolling in the Deep"	Adele
2	"Party Rock Anthem"	LMFAO featuring Lauren Bennett and GoonRock
3	"Firework"	Katy Perry
4	"E.T."	Katy Perry featuring Kanye West
5	"Give Me Everything"	Pitbull featuring Ne-Yo, Afrojack and Nayer
6	"Grenade"	Bruno Mars
7	"Fuck You (Forget You)"	CeeLo Green
8	"Super Bass"	Nicki Minaj
9	"Moves like Jagger"	Maroon 5 featuring Christina Aguilera
10	"Just Can't Get Enough"	The Black Eyed Peas
11	"On the Floor"	Jennifer Lopez featuring Pitbull
12	"S&M"	Rihanna
13	"Pumped Up Kicks"	Foster the People
14	"Last Friday Night (T.G.I.F.)"	Katy Perry
15	"Just the Way You Are"	Bruno Mars
16	"Tonight (I'm Lovin' You)"	Enrique Iglesias featuring Ludacris and DJ Frank E
17	"Raise Your Glass"	Pink
18	"Born This Way"	Lady Gaga
19	"Fuckin' Perfect"	Pink
20	"What's My Name?"	Rihanna featuring Drake
21	"Look at Me Now"	Chris Brown featuring Lil Wayne and Busta Rhymes
22	"Down on Me"	Jeremih featuring 50 Cent
23	"How to Love"	Lil Wayne
24	"Someone Like You"	Adele
25	"Good Life"	OneRepublic
26	"The Lazy Song"	Bruno Mars
27	"Till the World Ends"	Britney Spears
28	"The Show Goes On"	Lupe Fiasco
29	"The Edge of Glory"	Lady Gaga
30	"We R Who We R"	Kesha
31	"Black and Yellow"	Wiz Khalifa
32	"Tonight Tonight"	Hot Chelle Rae
33	"Blow"	Kesha
34	"Lighters"	Bad Meets Evil featuring Bruno Mars
35	"If I Die Young"	The Band Perry
36	"Stereo Hearts"	Gym Class Heroes featuring Adam Levine
37	"The Time (Dirty Bit)"	The Black Eyed Peas
38	"Coming Home"	Diddy – Dirty Money featuring Skylar Grey
39	"Hey Baby (Drop It to the Floor)"	Pitbull featuring T-Pain
40	"Only Girl (In the World)"	Rihanna
41	"6 Foot 7 Foot"	Lil Wayne featuring Cory Gunz
42	"Just a Kiss"	Lady Antebellum
43	"Dirt Road Anthem"	Jason Aldean
44	"Dynamite"	Taio Cruz
45	"No Hands"	Waka Flocka Flame featuring Wale and Roscoe Dash
46	"I Wanna Go"	Britney Spears
47	"I'm on One"	DJ Khaled featuring Drake, Rick Ross and Lil Wayne
48	"You Make Me Feel..."	Cobra Starship featuring Sabi
49	"Yeah 3x"	Chris Brown
50	"Moment 4 Life"	Nicki Minaj featuring Drake
51	"I Need a Doctor"	Dr. Dre featuring Eminem and Skylar Grey
52	"Just a Dream"	Nelly
53	"Motivation"	Kelly Rowland featuring Lil Wayne
54	"Stereo Love"	Edward Maya featuring Vika Jigulina
55	"Jar of Hearts"	Christina Perri
56	"Roll Up"	Wiz Khalifa
57	"Sexy and I Know It"	LMFAO
58	"Rocketeer"	Far East Movement featuring Ryan Tedder
59	"All of the Lights"	Kanye West
60	"Hold It Against Me"	Britney Spears
61	"More"	Usher
62	"What the Hell"	Avril Lavigne
63	"Written in the Stars"	Tinie Tempah featuring Eric Turner
64	"Bottoms Up"	Trey Songz featuring Nicki Minaj
65	"DJ Got Us Fallin' in Love"	Usher featuring Pitbull
66	"For the First Time"	The Script
67	"Honey Bee"	Blake Shelton
68	"Don't You Wanna Stay"	Jason Aldean featuring Kelly Clarkson
69	"We Found Love"	Rihanna featuring Calvin Harris
70	"Pretty Girl Rock"	Keri Hilson
71	"Yoü and I"	Lady Gaga
72	"Like a G6"	Far East Movement featuring The Cataracs and Dev
73	"Without You"	David Guetta featuring Usher
74	"Back to December"	Taylor Swift
75	"Teenage Dream"	Katy Perry
76	"Crazy Girl"	Eli Young Band
77	"Cheers (Drink to That)"	Rihanna
78	"Who Says"	Selena Gomez & the Scene
79	"Barefoot Blue Jean Night"	Jake Owen
80	"Knee Deep"	Zac Brown Band featuring Jimmy Buffett
81	"Country Girl (Shake It for Me)"	Luke Bryan
82	"Remind Me"	Brad Paisley and Carrie Underwood
83	"In the Dark"	Dev
84	"Backseat"	New Boyz featuring The Cataracs and Dev
85	"Headlines"	Drake
86	"Best Thing I Never Had"	Beyoncé
87	"Don't Wanna Go Home"	Jason Derulo
88	"Where Them Girls At"	David Guetta featuring Flo Rida and Nicki Minaj
89	"She Ain't You"	Chris Brown
90	"Take a Back Road"	Rodney Atkins
91	"Please Don't Go"	Mike Posner
92	"Sure Thing"	Miguel
93	"Price Tag"	Jessie J featuring B.o.B
94	"God Gave Me You"	Blake Shelton
95	"She Will"	Lil Wayne featuring Drake
96	"Are You Gonna Kiss Me or Not"	Thompson Square
97	"Animal"	Neon Trees
98	"You and Tequila"	Kenny Chesney featuring Grace Potter
99	"Colder Weather"	Zac Brown Band
100	"My Last"	Big Sean featuring Chris Brown

== See also ==
- 2011 in American music
- Billboard Year-End Hot R&B/Hip-Hop Songs of 2011
- Billboard Year-End Hot Rap Songs of 2011
- List of Billboard Hot 100 number-one singles of 2011
- List of Billboard Hot 100 top-ten singles in 2011
