= List of Ultratop 50 number-one singles of 2011 =

These hits topped the Belgian Ultratop 50 in 2011.

Flemish chart
Issue date	Song	Artist
1 January	"Hello"	Martin Solveig & Dragonette
8 January	"Hello"	Martin Solveig & Dragonette
15 January	"Hello"	Martin Solveig & Dragonette
22 January	"Discotex! (Yah!)"	DJ F.R.A.N.K.
29 January	"Rolling in the Deep"	Adele
5 February	"Rolling in the Deep"	Adele
12 February	"Rolling in the Deep"	Adele
19 February	"Rolling in the Deep"	Adele
26 February	"Born This Way"	Lady Gaga
5 March	"On the Floor"	Jennifer Lopez featuring Pitbull
12 March	"On the Floor"	Jennifer Lopez featuring Pitbull
19 March	"On the Floor"	Jennifer Lopez featuring Pitbull
26 March	"On the Floor"	Jennifer Lopez featuring Pitbull
2 April	"More to Me"	Idool 2011 Finalisten
9 April	"More to Me"	Idool 2011 Finalisten
16 April	"More to Me"	Idool 2011 Finalisten
23 April	"More to Me"	Idool 2011 Finalisten
30 April	"More to Me"	Idool 2011 Finalisten
7 May	"Price Tag"	Jessie J featuring B.o.B
14 May	"Party Rock Anthem"	LMFAO featuring Lauren Bennett & GoonRock
21 May	"Set Fire to the Rain"	Adele
28 May	"Set Fire to the Rain"	Adele
4 June	"She's Got Moves"	Kevin
11 June	"She's Got Moves"	Kevin
18 June	"Give Me Everything"	Pitbull featuring Ne-Yo, Afrojack & Nayer
25 June	"Give Me Everything"	Pitbull featuring Ne-Yo, Afrojack & Nayer
2 July	"Give Me Everything"	Pitbull featuring Ne-Yo, Afrojack & Nayer
9 July	"Give Me Everything"	Pitbull featuring Ne-Yo, Afrojack & Nayer
16 July	"Give Me Everything"	Pitbull featuring Ne-Yo, Afrojack & Nayer
23 July	"Loca People"	Sak Noel
30 July	"Loca People"	Sak Noel
6 August	"Loca People"	Sak Noel
13 August	"Loca People"	Sak Noel
20 August	"Il nous faut"	Elisa Tovati & Tom Dice
27 August	"Somebody That I Used to Know"	Gotye featuring Kimbra
3 September	"Somebody That I Used to Know"	Gotye featuring Kimbra
10 September	"Somebody That I Used to Know"	Gotye featuring Kimbra
17 September	"Somebody That I Used to Know"	Gotye featuring Kimbra
24 September	"Somebody That I Used to Know"	Gotye featuring Kimbra
1 October	"Somebody That I Used to Know"	Gotye featuring Kimbra
8 October	"Somebody That I Used to Know"	Gotye featuring Kimbra
15 October	"Somebody That I Used to Know"	Gotye featuring Kimbra
22 October	"Somebody That I Used to Know"	Gotye featuring Kimbra
29 October	"Somebody That I Used to Know"	Gotye featuring Kimbra
5 November	"Somebody That I Used to Know"	Gotye featuring Kimbra
12 November	"Somebody That I Used to Know"	Gotye featuring Kimbra
19 November	"I Follow Rivers"	Lykke Li
26 November	"I Follow Rivers"	Lykke Li
3 December	"I Follow Rivers"	Lykke Li
10 December	"Zanna"	Selah Sue & Tom Barman vs. The Subs
17 December	"Zanna"	Selah Sue & Tom Barman vs. The Subs
24 December	"Zanna"	Selah Sue & Tom Barman vs. The Subs
31 December	"Zanna"	Selah Sue & Tom Barman vs. The Subs

Francophone chart
Issue date	Song	Artist
1 January	"The Time (Dirty Bit)"	The Black Eyed Peas
8 January	"The Time (Dirty Bit)"	The Black Eyed Peas
15 January	"Who's That Chick?"	David Guetta featuring Rihanna
22 January	"Hold It Against Me"	Britney Spears
29 January	"Rolling in the Deep"	Adele
5 February	"Over the Rainbow"	Israel Kamakawiwo'ole
12 February	"Over the Rainbow"	Israel Kamakawiwo'ole
19 February	"Over the Rainbow"	Israel Kamakawiwo'ole
26 February	"Over the Rainbow"	Israel Kamakawiwo'ole
5 March	"Over the Rainbow"	Israel Kamakawiwo'ole
12 March	"On the Floor"	Jennifer Lopez featuring Pitbull
19 March	"On the Floor"	Jennifer Lopez featuring Pitbull
26 March	"On the Floor"	Jennifer Lopez featuring Pitbull
2 April	"Sweat"	Snoop Dogg vs. David Guetta
9 April	"On the Floor"	Jennifer Lopez featuring Pitbull
16 April	"Sweat"	Snoop Dogg vs. David Guetta
23 April	"Sweat"	Snoop Dogg vs. David Guetta
30 April	"Sweat"	Snoop Dogg vs. David Guetta
7 May	"Price Tag"	Jessie J featuring B.o.B
14 May	"Price Tag"	Jessie J featuring B.o.B
21 May	"Price Tag"	Jessie J featuring B.o.B
28 May	"Sweat"	Snoop Dogg vs. David Guetta
4 June	"L'horloge tourne"	Mickaël Miro
11 June	"L'horloge tourne"	Mickaël Miro
18 June	"Give Me Everything"	Pitbull featuring Ne-Yo, Afrojack & Nayer
25 June	"Give Me Everything"	Pitbull featuring Ne-Yo, Afrojack & Nayer
2 July	"L'horloge tourne"	Mickaël Miro
9 July	"Give Me Everything"	Pitbull featuring Ne-Yo, Afrojack & Nayer
16 July	"Give Me Everything"	Pitbull featuring Ne-Yo, Afrojack & Nayer
23 July	"Give Me Everything"	Pitbull featuring Ne-Yo, Afrojack & Nayer
30 July	"Set Fire to the Rain"	Adele
6 August	"Set Fire to the Rain"	Adele
13 August	"Set Fire to the Rain"	Adele
20 August	"Il nous faut"	Elisa Tovati & Tom Dice
27 August	"Il nous faut"	Elisa Tovati & Tom Dice
3 September	"Elle me dit"	Mika
10 September	"Elle me dit"	Mika
17 September	"Elle me dit"	Mika
24 September	"Elle me dit"	Mika
1 October	"Elle me dit"	Mika
8 October	"Elle me dit"	Mika
15 October	"Someone Like You"	Adele
22 October	"I Follow Rivers"	Lykke Li
29 October	"I Follow Rivers"	Lykke Li
5 November	"I Follow Rivers"	Lykke Li
12 November	"I Follow Rivers"	Lykke Li
19 November	"I Follow Rivers"	Lykke Li
26 November	"I Follow Rivers"	Lykke Li
3 December	"I Follow Rivers"	Lykke Li
10 December	"I Follow Rivers"	Lykke Li
17 December	"I Follow Rivers"	Lykke Li
24 December	"Je l'aime à mourir"	Shakira
31 December	"Je l'aime à mourir"	Shakira

== See also ==
- 2011 in music
