= Set Fire to the Rain =

2011 song by Adele

Single by Adele

from the album 21
- Released: 4 July 2011
- Recorded: 2010
- Studio: Angel (London); Myaudiotonic Studios (London)
- Genre: Soul pop
- Length: 4:02
- Label: XL; Columbia
- Songwriters: Adele Adkins; Fraser T. Smith
- Producer: Fraser T. Smith

Adele singles chronology
"Someone like You" (2011)	"Set Fire to the Rain" (2011)	"Rumour Has It" (2011)

Live video
- "Set Fire to the Rain" on YouTube

"Set Fire to the Rain" is a song recorded by English singer-songwriter Adele for her second studio album, 21 (2011). The song was written by Adele and Fraser T. Smith while the production was handled by the latter. It became Adele's third consecutive US number-one single from 21 and also reached number one in Belgium and the Netherlands as well as the top ten in most of other foreign markets. It is certified Diamond in Canada as well as Platinum or higher in fifteen additional countries. It is a pop power ballad with lush instrumentation and a swelling string arrangement, in contrast to the understated production of most songs on the album. The song has received acclaim from various critics with many complimenting on Adele's vocals. "Set Fire to the Rain" was voted by readers of Billboard as their favorite number one hit of 2012. Though no official music video was released for the song, a live performance from the DVD Live at the Royal Albert Hall was uploaded to video-sharing website YouTube. This rendition won the Grammy Award for Best Pop Solo Performance at the 55th Annual Grammy Awards.

== Background and composition ==
"Set Fire to the Rain" (2011)
A 23-second sample of "Set Fire to the Rain", which is written in the key of D minor with a tempo of 108 beats per minute.

"Set Fire to the Rain" was written by Adele and Fraser T. Smith while the production was handled by Smith. "Set Fire to the Rain" was released as the third US single from the 21 album on 21 November 2011.

"Set Fire to the Rain" is written in the key of D minor with a tempo of 108 beats per minute, following three chord progressions. Adele's voice spans A3-D5. The song describes the contradictory elements of a relationship, and the impossibility of letting go which is displayed in the lyrics "You and me together, nothing gets better / But there’s a side to you that I never knew, never knew / All the things you'd say, they were never true, never true / And the games you play, you would always win." One of the most pop-influenced of the album, the song is characterised by John Murphy of musicOMH as a "power ballad". In contrast to the understated production of most songs on the album, the song features lush instrumentation and a swelling string arrangement over a mid-tempo rhythm, creating a wall of sound for the singer's mourning vocals. Dave Simpson of The Guardian in an article revealed that Adele got inspiration for the song "when mah lightah stopped workin' [sic]" in the wet.

== Critical reception ==
The song has received widespread critical acclaim with many complimenting on Adele's vocals but received comparisons to Bruno Mars's song "Grenade" due to the similar tempo, vocal range and scale. A writer for the magazine URB said that the song had "Starbucks-friendlier content" and further called it "melodramatic". Leah Greenblatt of Entertainment Weekly concluded that the song had "scorned-woman balladry" and it "surge[s] on the pure force of her titanic wail." The New York Times said "the vocal effects on 'Set Fire to the Rain,' produced by Fraser T Smith, the most pop-minded of the assembled team, are superfluous." John Murphy of MusicOMH gave a mixed review towards the song calling it "real misfire" and "overproduced". He added, "it's a decent enough song, but Adele's always sounded best when it's just a piano and a voice." Writing for the newspaper Herald Sun, Camreon Adams called the song a "triumphant radio-hit-in-waiting of next single" and concluded that "once the chorus kicks in, you're a goner." Gary McGinley of No Ripcord highlighted "Set Fire to the Rain" calling it "the catchiest song" on 21. Another writer of Daily Herald said that Adele sounds "epic" on the song. Allison Stewart of The Washington Post found the song to be "galloping, out-of-place synth-rock number" and added that "even Adele can't save" the song. Nick Freed of Consequence of Sound said that "Set Fire to the Rain" finds Adele at "her strongest and most open." He further called the song "one of 21's angrier tracks" and concluded: "The chorus' hooks are crazy catchy, and by the final one Adele releases and her hurt slips through the anger to give you a damn real and forward show of emotion. I'd imagine seeing this song live or in a stripped down setting would make one bawl like a child. You’ll want to pump your fist and pound your chest. That’s a guarantee." Robert Copsey of Digital Spy praised the song saying, "'It was dark and I was over/ Until you kissed my lips and saved me,' she admits over a gloomy piano riff, before launching into a ballsy, hands-in-the-air chorus. 'I set fire to the rain/ and I threw us into the flames,' she belts with growly vocals against cinematic strings. Rounding out with a suitably breathtaking blast from her impressive pipes and the result sounds like classic, though it's anything but camp."

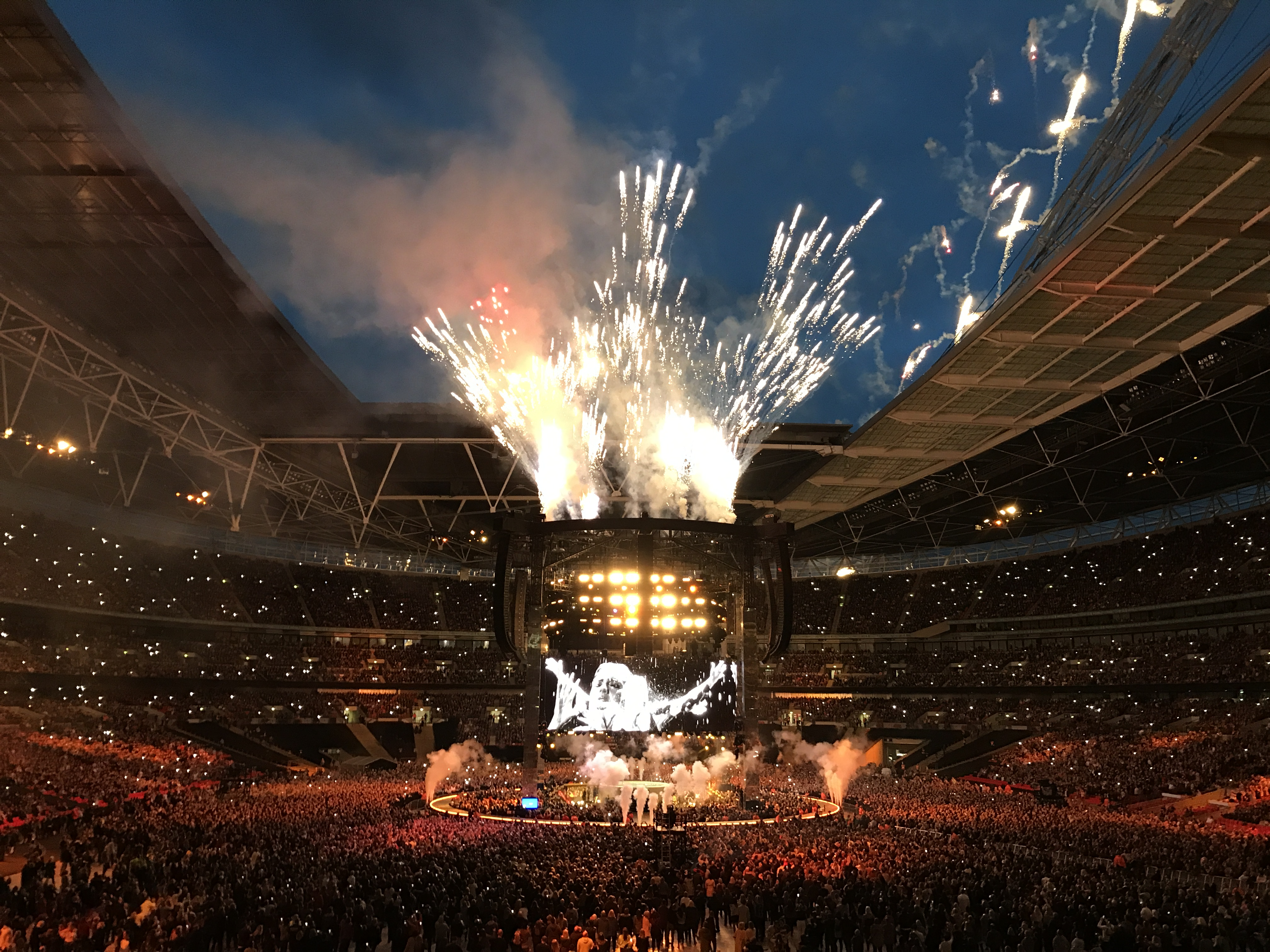
Adele performing "Set Fire to the Rain" at Wembley Stadium, June 2017.

== Chart performance ==
"Set Fire to the Rain" was very popular in Europe, where the song charted within the top 10 of Austria, Denmark, Finland, France, Germany, Ireland, Italy, Norway, and Switzerland and topping the charts in South Africa, New Zealand, Belgium, Poland, Slovakia and the Netherlands. The song debuted at number 79 on the UK singles chart and it moved to number 44 the next week selling 6,286 copies. It later peaked at number 11 on the chart on the week ending 16 July 2011 and it stayed on the same position for two weeks selling another 24,978 copies.

Before being released as a single, the song charted on the Billboard Hot 100 for six weeks and re-entered three times, peaking at number 72 on 13 September. On the issue dated 4 February 2012, "Set Fire to the Rain" peaked at number one on the Billboard Hot 100 and became Adele's third consecutive number one single from the album 21. With 21 also at number one on the Billboard 200, the song makes the set the first by a single artist to have led the Billboard 200 concurrently with three Hot 100 number one singles. It took 21 non-consecutive weeks for the song to reach the top spot in the United States. As of April 2020, it has sold 5,200,000 digital downloads in the United States. With this achievement, 21 became one of only six albums to yield at least three number one singles during the decade; sharing the honour with Katy Perry's Teenage Dream (5), Rihanna's Loud (3), Taylor Swift's 1989 (3), Justin Bieber's Purpose (3) and Drake's Scorpion (3).

== Music video ==
No proper music video was shot for "Set Fire to the Rain" (as well as other singles from 21, "Rumour Has It" and "Turning Tables") as Adele had recently undergone vocal surgery. Instead, a live performance video filmed at the Royal Albert Hall was uploaded on YouTube to her Vevo account, which is only available in certain countries.

== Accolades ==
Year	Organization	Award	Result	Ref.
2012	BMI London Awards	Award Winning Song	Won	
2012	Teen Choice Awards	Choice Music Single – Female	Nominated	
2013	BMI Pop Awards	Award Winning Song	Won	
2013	Grammy Awards	Best Pop Solo Performance (won for the live version from Live at the Royal Albert Hall)	Won	

== Live performances and usage in media ==
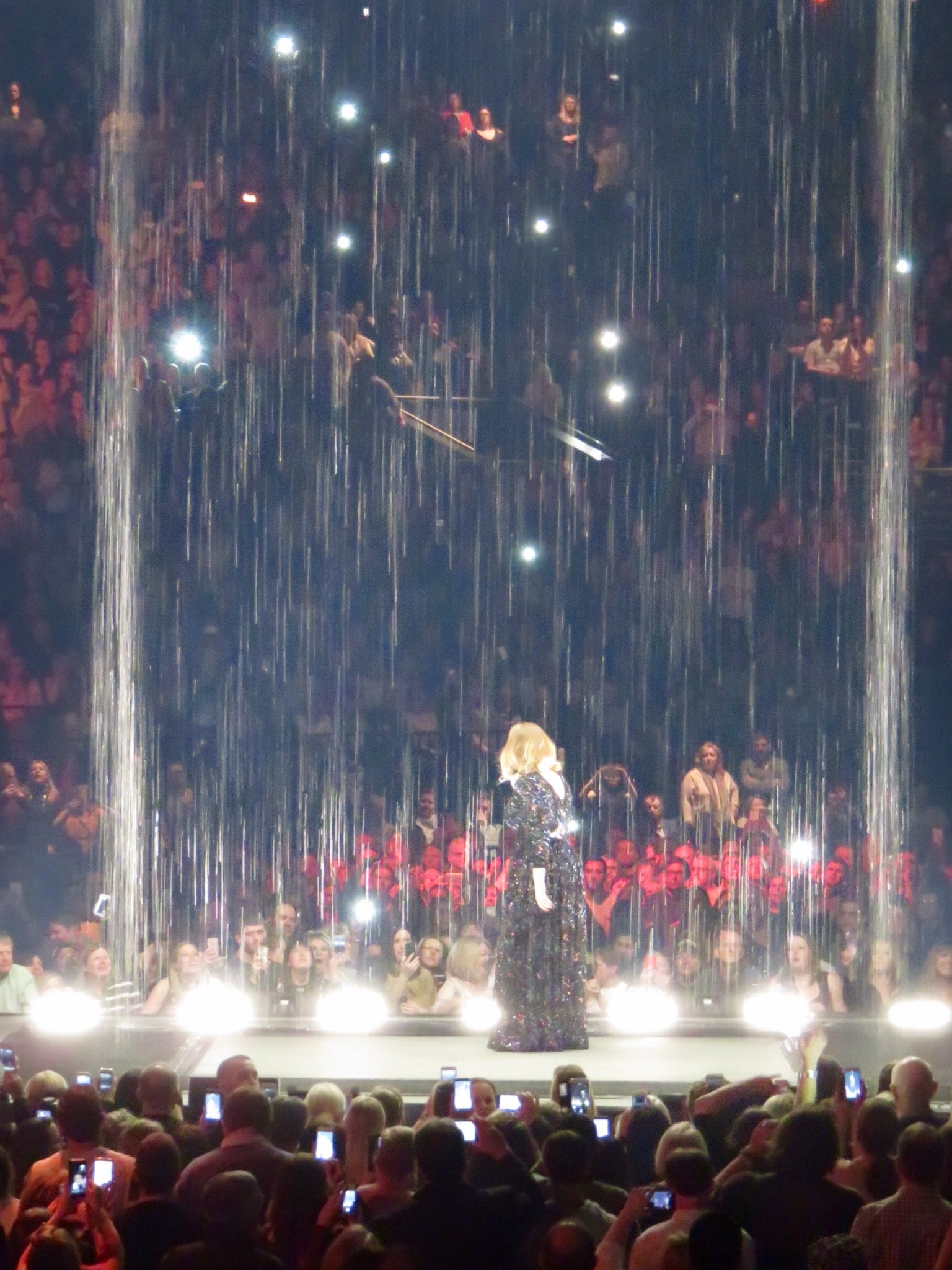
Adele sings "Set Fire to the Rain" at the Genting Arena in Birmingham, March 2016

Adele performed the song live for the first time on 24 January 2011 (the same day 21 was released) at The Tabernacle, Notting Hill, in London. She also performed the track on 3 May on Later... with Jools Holland along with the selections "Rolling in the Deep", "Don't You Remember" and "Take It All". Adele added the song to the set list of her second worldwide tour.

It was featured on the international soundtrack of the 2012 Brazilian soap opera Avenida Brasil.

== Notable cover versions ==
- On 2 September 2014, Danielle Bradbery, season 4 winner of The Voice in the USA, published a cover of "Set Fire to the Rain" on Vevo and YouTube; her performance was praised by Rolling Stone.

== Track listing ==
- Digital and downloads
1. "Set Fire to the Rain" – 4:02
- Digital and CD EP — remixes
1. "Set Fire to the Rain" (Thomas Gold Remix) – 5:50
2. "Set Fire to the Rain" (Thomas Gold Dub) – 5:21
3. "Set Fire to the Rain" (Moto Blanco Remix) – 7:38
4. "Set Fire to the Rain" (Moto Blanco Edit) – 3:35

== Credits and personnel ==
Credits are taken from 21 liner notes.

- Vocals – Adele
- Songwriting – Adele Adkins, Fraser T Smith
- Audio mixing, record producer, bass, guitar, piano – Fraser T Smith
- Drums - Ash Soan
- Recording engineer - Beatriz Artola
- Assistant recording engineer - Isabel Seeliger-Morley
- String section performed by - Wired Strings
- String arrangements - Rosie Danvers
- String section recording engineer - Steve Price

== Charts ==
=== Weekly charts ===
Weekly chart performance
Chart (2011–2023)	Peak position
Australia (ARIA)	11
Austria (Ö3 Austria Top 40)	5
Belgium (Ultratop 50 Flanders)	1
Belgium (Ultratop 50 Wallonia)	1
Brazil (Crowley Broadcast Analysis)	3
Canada Hot 100 (Billboard)	2
Croatia International Airplay (HRT)	2
Czech Republic Airplay (ČNS IFPI)	1
Czech Republic Singles Digital (ČNS IFPI)	38
Denmark (Tracklisten)	5
Europe (Euro Digital Songs)	6
Finland (Suomen virallinen lista)	2
Finnish Airplay (Radiosoittolista)	57
France (SNEP)	9
Germany (GfK)	6
Global 200 (Billboard)	64
Greece Digital Songs (Billboard)	6
Hungary (Rádiós Top 40)	9
Hungary (Single Top 40)	25
Ireland (IRMA)	6
Israel International Airplay (Media Forest)	1
Italy (FIMI)	3
Japan (Japan Hot 100)	88
Lebanon Airplay (Lebanese Top 20)	3
Luxembourg Digital Songs (Billboard)	5
MENA (IFPI)	15
Mexico (Billboard Mexican Airplay)	2
Mexico Anglo (Monitor Latino)	1
Netherlands (Dutch Top 40)	1
Netherlands (Single Top 100)	1
New Zealand (Recorded Music NZ)	8
Norway (VG-lista)	4
Poland Airplay (ZPAV)	1
Poland Dance (ZPAV)	41
Portugal Digital Songs (Billboard)	2
Romania (Romanian Top 100)	15
Saudi Arabia (IFPI)	20
Scottish Singles Sales (Official Charts)	10
Slovakia Airplay (ČNS IFPI)	1
Slovenia (SloTop50)	3
South Africa (RISA)	98
South Korea International Chart (Gaon)	34
Spain (Promusicae)	24
Sweden (Sverigetopplistan)	13
Switzerland (Schweizer Hitparade)	4
UK Singles (Official Charts)	11
US Billboard Hot 100	1
US Adult Contemporary (Billboard)	1
US Adult Pop Airplay (Billboard)	1
US Dance Club Songs (Billboard)	18
US Dance Airplay (Billboard)	3
US Hot Latin Songs (Billboard)	19
US Rock & Alternative Airplay (Billboard)	24
US Hot Rock & Alternative Songs (Billboard)	30
US Pop Airplay (Billboard)	1
US Rhythmic Airplay (Billboard)	16

=== Monthly charts ===
Monthly chart performance
Chart (2025)	Peak position
Russia Streaming (TopHit)	99

=== Year-end charts ===
Year-end chart performance
Chart (2011)	Position
Australia (ARIA)	49
Austria (Ö3 Austria Top 40)	25
Belgium (Ultratop 50 Flanders)	3
Belgium (Ultratop 40 Wallonia)	8
Croatia International Airplay (HRT)	1
Denmark (Hitlisten)	14
Germany (Media Control AG)	16
Hungary (Rádiós Top 40)	51
Iceland (Tónlist)	25
Ireland (IRMA)	19
Israel (Media Forest)	1
Italy (FIMI)	12
Netherlands (Dutch Top 40)	4
Netherlands (Mega Single Top 100)	8
New Zealand (RIANZ)	22
Sweden (Sverigetopplistan)	68
Switzerland (Schweizer Hitparade)	10
UK Singles (Official Charts Company)	29

Year-end chart performance
Chart (2012)	Position
Belgium (Ultratop 50 Flanders)	72
Belgium (Ultratop 50 Wallonia)	68
Brazil (Crowley)	3
Canada (Canadian Hot 100)	12
Hungary (Rádiós Top 40)	76
Italy (FIMI)	83
Greece (IFPI)	71
Spain (PROMUSICAE)	42
US Billboard Hot 100	12
US Adult Contemporary (Billboard)	2
US Adult Top 40 (Billboard)	7
US Mainstream Top 40 (Billboard)	10
US Hot Rock Songs (Billboard)	87

Year-end chart performance
Chart (2013)	Position
Slovenia (SloTop50)	50

Year-end chart performance
Chart (2023)	Position
Global 200 (Billboard)	130
Netherlands (Single Top 100)	86

== Certifications ==
Certifications and sales
Region	Certification	Certified units/sales
Australia (ARIA)	3× Platinum	210,000^{^}
Belgium (BRMA)	Platinum	30,000^{*}
Brazil (Pro-Música Brasil)	2× Diamond	500,000^{‡}
Canada (Music Canada)	Diamond	800,000^{‡}
Denmark (IFPI Danmark)	3× Platinum	270,000^{‡}
Germany (BVMI)	Platinum	300,000^{^}
Italy (FIMI)	3× Platinum	90,000^{*}
Mexico (AMPROFON)	4× Platinum	240,000^{*}
New Zealand (RMNZ)	6× Platinum	180,000^{‡}
Norway (IFPI Norway)	Platinum	60,000^{‡}
Portugal (AFP)	2× Platinum	40,000^{‡}
South Korea (Gaon Chart)	—	375,268
Spain (Promusicae)	3× Platinum	180,000^{‡}
Switzerland (IFPI Switzerland)	Platinum	30,000^{^}
United Kingdom (BPI)	5× Platinum	3,000,000^{‡}
United States (RIAA)	4× Platinum	5,200,000
Streaming
Greece (IFPI Greece)	Platinum	2,000,000^{†}
^{*} Sales figures based on certification alone.^{^} Shipments figures based on certification alone.^{‡} Sales+streaming figures based on certification alone.^{†} Streaming-only figures based on certification alone.

== Release history ==
Release dates for "Set Fire to the Rain"
Region	Date	Format
Austria	4 July 2011	Digital EP — remixes
Germany	4 July 2011	Digital EP — remixes
Italy	4 July 2011	Digital EP — remixes
Netherlands	4 July 2011	Digital EP — remixes
United Kingdom	4 July 2011	Digital EP — remixes
United States	21 November 2011	AC radio
United States	5 December 2011	Triple A radio
United States	13 December 2011	Mainstream radio

== See also ==
- List of best-selling singles
- List of best-selling singles in the United States
- List of Dutch Top 40 number-one singles of 2011
- List of Ultratop 50 number-one singles of 2011
- List of Ultratop 40 number-one singles of 2011
- List of number-one singles of 2011 (Poland)
- List of Billboard Hot 100 number-one singles of 2012
- List of Adult Top 40 number-one singles of 2012
- List of Mainstream Top 40 number-one hits of 2012 (U.S.)
- List of Billboard Adult Contemporary number ones of 2012
- List of number-one pop hits of 2012 (Brazil)
