= List of number-one songs of 2011 (Russia) =

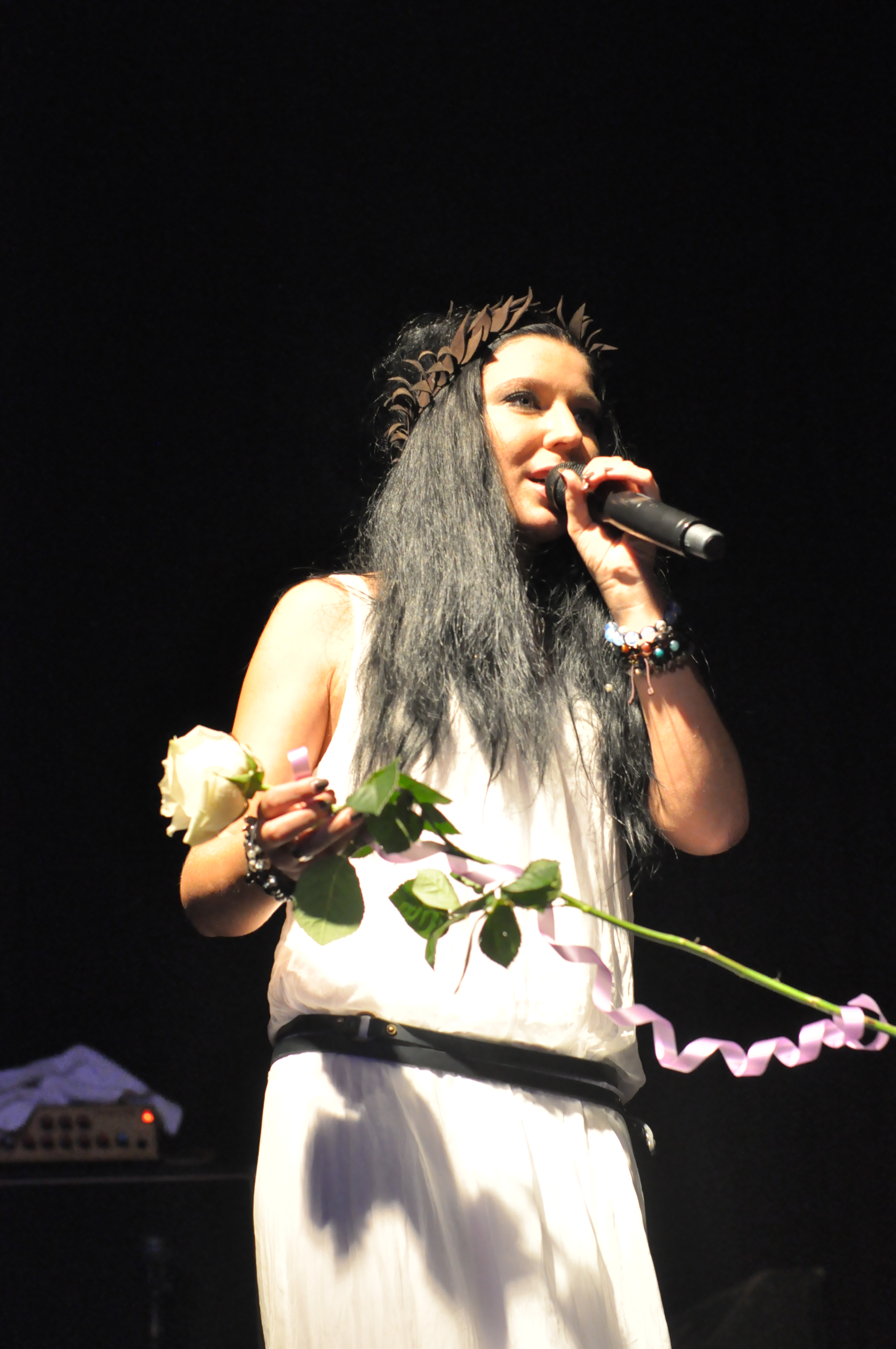
Yolka spent more than 13 weeks in the first place in 2011, which was the best result.

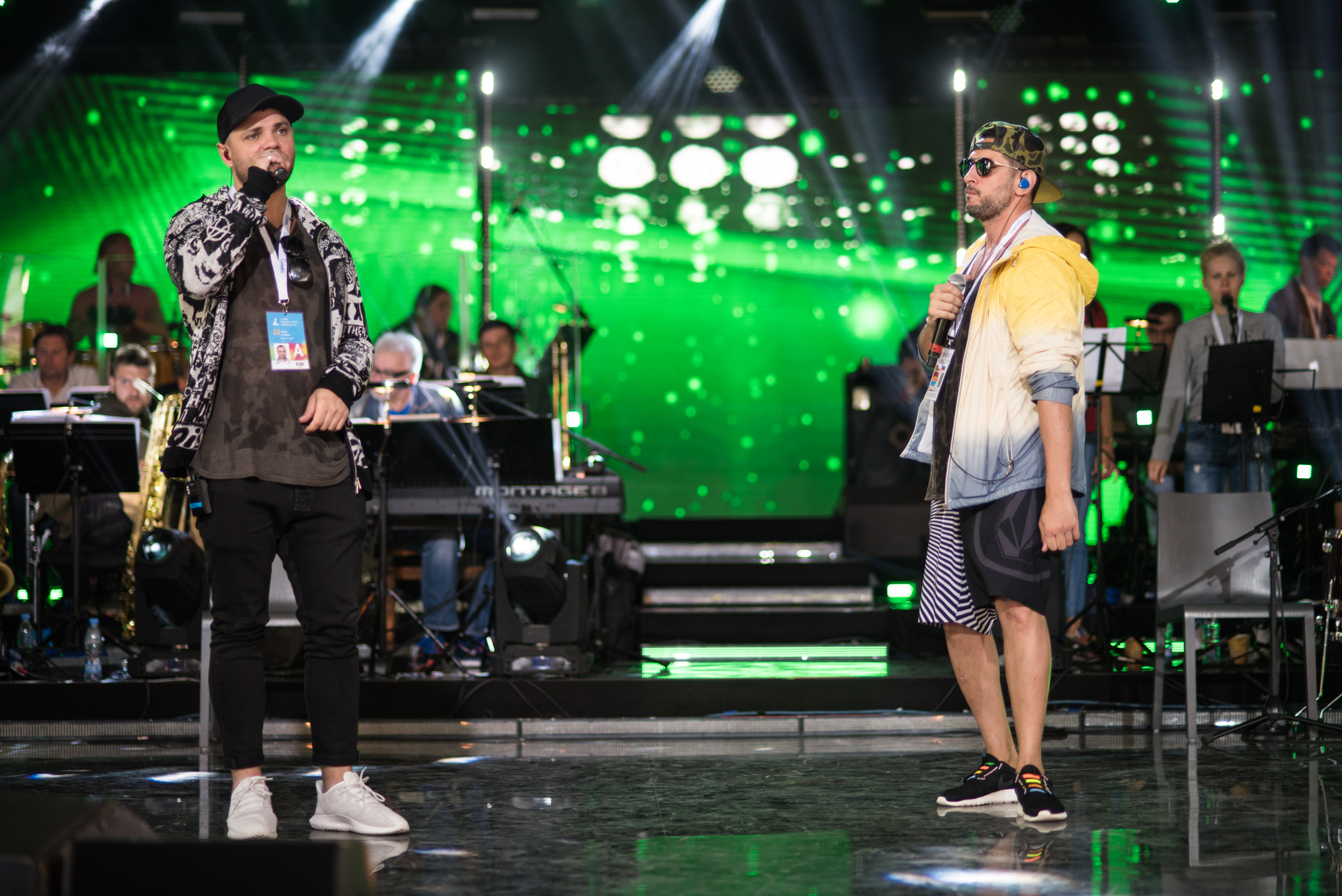
The band Gradusy with the song "Golaya" remained in the lead for 7 weeks.

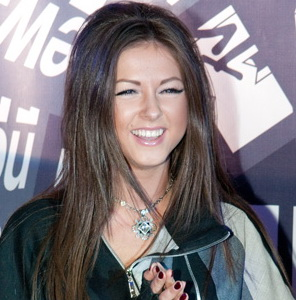
Nyusha spent the remaining 6 weeks of the year at the top with the song "Higher".

The list of number-one singles in Russia in 2011 includes songs that topped the Top Radio Hits chart at the end of each of the weeks of 2011. The list is compiled based on TopHit data. It is worth noting that 2011 was the first year when TopHit began publishing radio charts for Russia and Ukraine, separate from the general CIS chart. The data was updated every Monday.

Dima Bilan became the first leader of the chart with the song "Ya prosto lyublyu tebya", he spent five weeks at the top. On 7 and 14 February, Alexandra Stan took the first place with the song "Mr. Saxobeat". For more than a month, the singer Yolka held the lead with the song "Provans", in total, the singer spent 8 weeks in the first place. Another leader of the year in terms of the number of weeks at the top was Gradusy with the song "Golaya" (7 weeks). Summer hits include the songs "Wet" by Snoop Dogg (leader of June), "Loca People" by Sak Noel (who topped the chart in July–August) and "Na bolshom vozdushnom share" by Yolka (spent the remaining weeks of August at the top). In October, the first place was for the song "Love You like a Love Song" by Selena Gomez. The last chart in 2011 was headed by Nyusha with the song "Vyshe" (6 weeks of leadership). A total of 13 songs topped the chart that year.

== Chart history ==
Issue date	Song	Artist(s)	Ref.
3 January	"Ya prosto lyublyu tebya"	Dima Bilan	
10 January	"Ya prosto lyublyu tebya"	Dima Bilan	
17 January	"Ya prosto lyublyu tebya"	Dima Bilan	
24 January	"Ya prosto lyublyu tebya"	Dima Bilan	
31 January	"Ya prosto lyublyu tebya"	Dima Bilan	
7 February	"Mr. Saxobeat"	Alexandra Stan	
14 February	"Mr. Saxobeat"	Alexandra Stan	
21 February	"Provans"	Yolka	
28 February	"Provans"	Yolka	
7 March	"Provans"	Yolka	
14 March	"Provans"	Yolka	
21 March	"Provans"	Yolka	
28 March	"Provans"	Yolka	
4 April	"Golaya"	Gradusy	
11 April	"Golaya"	Gradusy	
18 April	"Provans"	Yolka	
25 April	"Provans"	Yolka	
2 May	"Golaya"	Gradusy	
9 May	"Golaya"	Gradusy	
16 May	"Golaya"	Gradusy	
23 May	"Golaya"	Gradusy	
30 May	"Golaya"	Gradusy	
6 June	"Wet" (David Guetta Remix)	Snoop Dogg	
13 June	"Wet" (David Guetta Remix)	Snoop Dogg	
20 June	"Wet" (David Guetta Remix)	Snoop Dogg	
27 June	"Never Be Alone"	Deepside Deejays	
4 July	"Wet" (David Guetta Remix)	Snoop Dogg	
11 July	"Loca People"	Sak Noel	
18 July	"Loca People"	Sak Noel	
25 July	"Loca People"	Sak Noel	
1 August	"Loca People"	Sak Noel	
8 August	"Loca People"	Sak Noel	
15 August	"Na bolshom vozdushnom share"	Yolka	
22 August	"Na bolshom vozdushnom share"	Yolka	
29 August	"Na bolshom vozdushnom share"	Yolka	
5 September	"Give Me Everything"	Pitbull	
12 September	"Na bolshom vozdushnom share"	Yolka	
19 September	"Na bolshom vozdushnom share"	Yolka	
26 September	"Love You like a Love Song"	Selena Gomez & The Scene	
3 October	"Love You like a Love Song"	Selena Gomez & The Scene	
10 October	"Love You like a Love Song"	Selena Gomez & The Scene	
17 October	"In the Dark"	Dev	
24 October	"Love You like a Love Song"	Selena Gomez & The Scene	
31 October	"Love You like a Love Song"	Selena Gomez & The Scene	
7 November	"Moves Like Jagger"	Maroon 5 and Christina Aguilera	
14 November	"Moves Like Jagger"	Maroon 5 and Christina Aguilera	
21 November	"Vyshe"	Nyusha	
28 November	"Vyshe"	Nyusha	
5 December	"Vyshe"	Nyusha	
12 December	"Vyshe"	Nyusha	
19 December	"Vyshe"	Nyusha	
26 December	"Vyshe"	Nyusha	

== Number-one artists ==
Artist	Weeks at No. 1	Top Artists position	Ref.
Yolka	13	6	
Gradusy	7	11	
Nyusha	6	2	
Dima Bilan	5	12	
Selena Gomez & The Scene	5	73/74	
Sak Noel	5	–	
Snoop Dogg	4	31	
Alexandra Stan	2	21	
Christina Aguilera	2	18	
Maroon 5	2	45	
Pitbull	1	1	
Deepside Deejays	1	61	
