= Moves like Jagger =

2011 single by Maroon 5 featuring Christina Aguilera

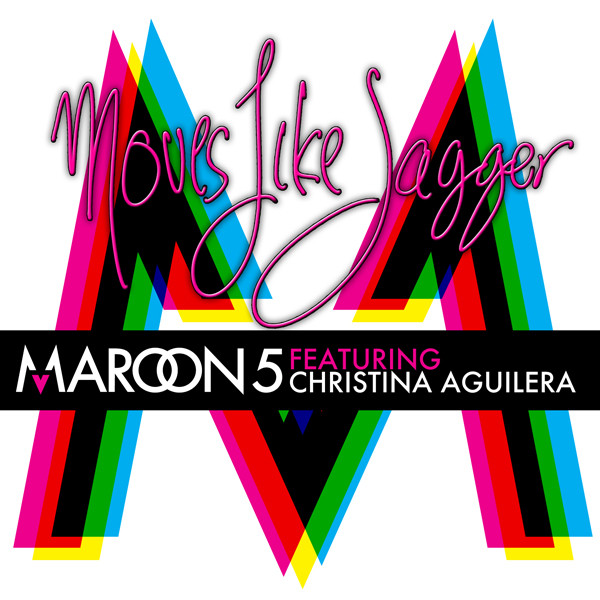

Single by Maroon 5 featuring Christina Aguilera

from the album Hands All Over
- Released: June 21, 2011
- Recorded: May 2011; Los Angeles, California
- Genre: Disco; electropop; dance-pop
- Length: 3:21
- Label: A&M Octone
- Songwriters: Adam Levine; Benny Blanco; Ammar Malik; Shellback
- Producers: Shellback; Benny Blanco

Maroon 5 singles chronology
"Never Gonna Leave This Bed" (2011)	"Moves like Jagger" (2011)	"Payphone" (2012)

Christina Aguilera singles chronology
"Show Me How You Burlesque" (2010)	"Moves like Jagger" (2011)	"Your Body" (2012)

Audio sample
- "Moves Like Jagger": file; help

Music video
- "Moves like Jagger" on YouTube

"Moves like Jagger" is a song by American pop rock band Maroon 5 featuring American singer Christina Aguilera. It was released on June 21, 2011, as the fourth and final single from the re-release of the group's third studio album Hands All Over (2010). The song was written by band frontman Adam Levine, Ammar Malik, and producers Benny Blanco and Shellback. "Moves like Jagger" is an electropop song with modern disco style elements and is backed by synths and electronic drums. The lyrics refer to a male's ability to impress a love interest with his dance moves, which he compares to those of Mick Jagger, the lead singer of the Rolling Stones.

"Moves like Jagger" garnered generally favorable reviews by music critics, who praised the song's chorus. Praise also went to the vocals of Christina Aguilera. The song was a commercial success, going on to top the charts in over 20 countries. In the United States, "Moves like Jagger" became the band's second (after 2007's "Makes Me Wonder") and Aguilera's fifth number-one single and is among the best-selling singles of all time. The song also made Aguilera the second female artist to score a number-one hit in the 1990s, 2000s, and 2010s, which in turn made her the fourth woman to score number-one singles in three different decades.

The music video was directed by Jonas Åkerlund. The video features old video footage of Jagger and his iconic dance moves. "Moves like Jagger" was nominated for a Grammy Award for Best Pop Duo/Group Performance at the 54th Grammy Awards but lost to "Body and Soul" by Tony Bennett and Amy Winehouse. The song was first performed in June 2011 on an episode of The Voice (where Levine and Aguilera both served as coaches).

Internationally, the song was the ninth-best-selling digital single of 2011 with sales of 7 million copies. After Wham!'s "Last Christmas" topped the charts in 2021, "Moves like Jagger" became the UK's biggest-selling single that never topped the charts. The song was certified Diamond by the Recording Industry Association of America (RIAA) in 2021.

== Background and development ==
"Moves like Jagger" was written and produced by Benjamin Levin, also known as Benny Blanco, and Shellback, while additional writing was done by Adam Levine. The initial concept for the song, including the phrase "moves like Jagger" and characteristic whistle, was originated by Shellback. Shellback sent a demo to Blanco, who then played it to Levine; Levine loved the song and decided to finish and record it. When asked about the song, Levine said, "It was one of those songs that was definitely a risk; it's a bold statement. We've never really released a song like that. But it's exciting to do something different, do something new. I'm just happy everyone likes it." Some media outlets noted that Levine looked outside his own band for songwriting assistance which Levine responded to saying, "What I've learned from the recent few months is that it's OK to collaborate with other songwriters [...] I was always kind of staunchly opposed to it in the past, I think almost to a fault. I think I've got a lot to offer as a songwriter, but everybody hits a wall". He went on to praise Mick Jagger, the inspiration for the song saying,

"Jagger has the moves like Jagger. That being said, if there was ever someone to aspire to, I don't think anyone could claim to have the moves like James Brown, or the moves like Michael Jackson, or the moves like Prince [...] There's something about the way [Jagger] moves that is uniquely his own and hard to imitate, but also accessible and silly and fun, and not taking itself too seriously".

On adding Christina Aguilera to the song, Levine stated that "there's a lot of bravado in this song" and that their idea was that "if [they] could share vocals with a female, it would kind of curb the cockiness a little bit in a way that was more welcoming". Levine went on to say praise Aguilera stating that, "Christina is an incredible singer. There aren't many people out there that can sing like she can. And that was definitely like, well, let's just - let's have her really knock this out. And she did it in two seconds".

== Composition ==
"Moves like Jagger" is a disco, electropop, and dance-pop song. It features a "throbbing" synth, fast-paced beat and electronic drums. Robbie Daw from Idolator wrote that "Moves like Jagger" slightly echoes The Rolling Stones' chart-topping 1978 classic "Miss You", and added that "Levine's voice is distorted via Auto-Tune on the chorus." The song is introduced by a whistle melody and light, funky guitar in the key of B minor with a tempo of 128 beats per minute. Levine tries his best to impress his female interest with dance moves like The Rolling Stones frontman Mick Jagger singing, "I don't need to try to control you / Look into my eyes and I'll own you / With the moves like Jagger / I got the moves like Jagger / I got the moves like Jagger."

Aguilera appears during the song's bridge, playing her role as a tease with a self-written verse, "You want to know how to make me smile / Take control, own me just for the night / But if I share my secret / You gonna have to keep it / Nobody else can see this." Aguilera's contributions to the song consists of two interchangeable verses directly referencing her own song "Genie in a Bottle" from her debut album, Christina Aguilera (1999) with the lyrics, "Rub me right". Some critics panned the song for Aguilera's verse being too short comparing it to her 2001 effort on "Lady Marmalade".

== Reception ==
=== Critical reception ===
Upon release, the song received generally positive reviews. Bill Lamb from About.com gave the song a positive review, giving the single four-and-a-half out of five stars. Lamb wrote that, "The funky, whistle driven melody here is loose, light, and irresistibly funky. The punchy guest vocal from fellow judge Christina Aguilera is simply icing on the cake. There is a real vocal chemistry between Aguilera and Levine." Lamb called the song an "outstanding summer song", writing that "It is light, danceable, and would sound great in the car with the top down." He went on to say, "An infectious whistle melody kicks things off with light, funky guitar and we're on our way to a great summer song. Maroon 5's Adam Levine guides us into the song with a trademark blend of soulful and slightly aloof. Later the throaty sound of Christina Aguilera grounds "Moves like Jagger" making it all a near perfect summer of 2011 audio treat".

Robbie Daw from Idolator wrote that "It takes a full two minutes and 15 seconds for Christina's soulful pipes to begin trilling on "Moves like Jagger." But once she does, she immediately steals the show." Daw concluded by writing that "this is the best thing from either of these two in years."

Rolling Stone noted that, "The Voice judges [...] start off the song as an easygoing R&B-inflected pop tune before Aguilera showed up near the end to kick it all into high gear with her brassy, super-charged voice. As on the show, the two singers have a terrific chemistry, with Levine's chill vibe acting as the perfect counterbalance to the diva's fiery intensity". While naming the song "a contender for 2011's song of the summer",

James Dinh from MTV Newsroom wrote that "Adam Levine and Christina Aguilera have turned their friendly rivalry on NBC's The Voice into some studio chemistry." Robert Copsey wrote for Digital Spy: "Take me by the tongue and I'll know you/ Kiss me till you're drunk and I'll show you," Ad insists over a funky, finger-clicking bassline and an irresistible whistle hook that immediately burrows deep into the recesses of your brain. "If I share my secret/ You're gonna have to keep it," Christina says on her short, sweet and perfectly formed cameo. We've already got your number, love, but our surprise is still 100% genuine."

Jagger himself acknowledged the song in an interview, calling the concept "very flattering." The song was ranked number three on BBC Radio 2's most played songs of the 2010s. In 2022, Billboard and American Songwriter ranked the song number three and number four, respectively, on their lists of the 10 greatest Maroon 5 songs. British Journal of Psychology named the song a classic earworm.

=== Accolades ===
Year	Organization	Award	Result	Ref(s).
2011	4Music Video Honours	Best Video	Nominated	
2011	Cyworld Digital Music Awards	International Artist of the Month – July	Won	
2011	Cyworld Digital Music Awards	International Artist of the Month – August	Won	
2011	EarOne Awards	Best Song	Won	
2011	Idolator Music Video Awards	Best Music Video Featuring People; Impersonating Pop Stars	Nominated	
2011	Idolator Music Video Awards	Best Music Video Somehow Associated with Mick Jagger	Won	
2011	PopCrush Awards	Song of the Year	Nominated	
2012	APRA Music Awards	International Work of the Year	Nominated	
2012	ASCAP Pop Music Awards	Most Performed Song	Won	
2012	Billboard Music Awards	Top 100 Song	Nominated	
2012	Billboard Music Awards	Top Streaming Song	Nominated	
2012	Billboard Music Awards	Top Digital Song	Nominated	
2012	Billboard Music Awards	Top Pop Song	Nominated	
2012	Cyworld Digital Music Awards	International Artist of the Month – March	Won	
2012	Grammy Awards	Best Pop Duo/Group Performance	Nominated	
2012	International Dance Music Awards	Best Pop/Dance Track	Nominated	
2012	MTV Italian Music Awards	Best Video	Nominated	
2012	MuchMusic Video Awards	International Video of the Year — Group	Nominated	
2012	Myx Music Awards	Favorite International Video	Nominated	
2012	People's Choice Awards	Favorite Song of the Year	Nominated	
2012	Teen Choice Awards	Choice Music: Single by a Group	Nominated	
2013	ASCAP Pop Music Awards	Most Performed Song	Won	
2013	BMI Pop Awards	Award Winning Song	Won	
2013	BMI Pop Awards	Publisher of the Year (UMPG)	Won	
2013	BMI Pop Awards	Song of the Year	Won	
2013	BMI Pop Awards	Songwriter of the Year	Won	

== Commercial performance ==
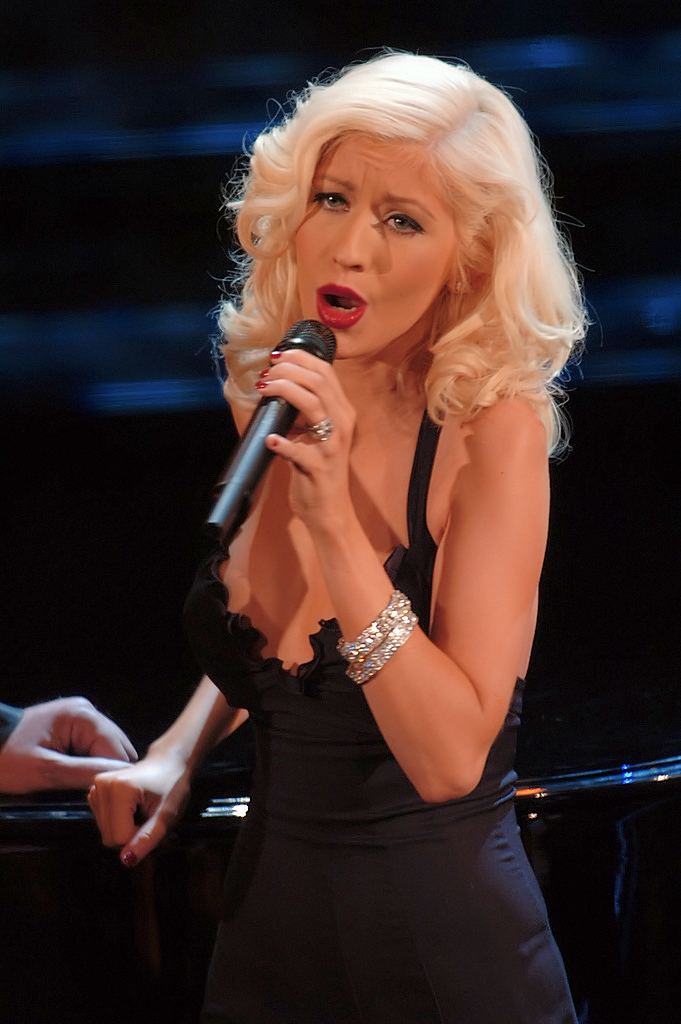
The song made Aguilera only the second female artist to have a number-one single in the 1990s, 2000s and 2010s and fourth for all females.

On July 9, 2011, "Moves like Jagger" debuted at number eight on the United States Billboard Hot 100, and topped the chart on September 10, 2011, as the greatest airplay gainer for the third consecutive week. It spent 10 weeks in the top three. For Maroon 5, the song became their first number one and top 10 on their chart since "Makes Me Wonder" in 2007. For Aguilera, the song became her fifth number one, and was her first since "Lady Marmalade" in 2001. Aguilera joined Janet Jackson, Madonna and Britney Spears as the fourth female artist to top the Hot 100 over three decades. During the week of October 1, 2011, the song advanced to number one on the Hot 100 Airplay. By March 2013, it had sold over 6 million digital copies in the United States.

On August 1, 2011, "Moves like Jagger" reached number two on the Australian ARIA Charts, making it Aguilera's highest-charting single since "Candyman" in 2007, and held the runner-up spot for ten straight weeks. On the week of August 20, 2011, the song topped the Canadian Hot 100 chart, becoming the band's second number-one single and Aguilera's third number-one single, her first in almost nine years (the last one was the 2002 hit "Beautiful").

"Moves like Jagger" made its debut on the UK Singles Chart at number three and sold 56,000 copies on the issue dated August 21, 2011, becoming Maroon 5's fourth top 10 hit and Aguilera's fifteenth top 10 hit in the UK. Starting at the issue date September 10, it peaked at number two for seven consecutive weeks, equaling the all-time UK record held by All-4-One's "I Swear" for the longest stay at number two by a hit not to reach number one.

On October 5, 2011, the song reached number one in the mid-week chart update but failed to reach the number-one spot the following Sunday due to the mid-week release of Rihanna's new single "We Found Love" which debuted at number one keeping "Moves like Jagger" away from the number-one position. In the first six of these weeks, it was held off the top of the chart by six different number-one singles consecutively, each of which debuted directly ahead of it; this after having already been held at number three behind two different pairs of new entries in its first two weeks on the chart.

After spending seven straight weeks at number two in the singles charts without ever managing to claim the number-one spot, it ironically peaked at number two in the year-end chart of 2011's bestselling singles as well, outselling all the songs that had kept it off number one. It became the biggest-selling song not to peak at number one in 2012. As of September 2017, "Moves like Jagger" has sold 1,536,000 copies in the United Kingdom, in an uninterrupted 52-week run in the chart.

== Music video ==
=== Background ===
The music video for "Moves like Jagger" was directed by Jonas Åkerlund and filmed in the Los Angeles Theater, Los Angeles, California on July 8, 2011. On July 9, Aguilera posted an image of herself from the video shoot via Twitter, saying, "Always great to see Jonas Akerlund. He created the perfect feel for the song. Expect a fun video." The image showed Aguilera performing with a band in front of a background of the American flag. Four shirtless images of Levine from the shoot were also released online the same day. The Rolling Stones frontman Mick Jagger made an appearance in the video "via archive footage". The video features an incorrect, simplified version of the Union Flag as a backdrop for parts of the song. For Levine and his bandmates, the song and video are all about exposing a new generation to the rock legend. "We were lucky enough to get Mick's endorsement [for the video], as far as him giving us access to a bunch of different footage that's so cool," Levine told MTV News when they visited the video's set last month. "Not many people have seen [it], especially a newer generation of people that don't know so much about how incredible he was." The video premiered on August 8, 2011, on E! and was released the following day on Vevo. That same month, the band also released three versions of the same music video from their YouTube channel, those being an explicit version, a non-Vevo banner version and a band edit version, respectively.

=== Synopsis ===
Levine and Aguilera singing together in the music video.

The video opens with black-and-white footage of the theater, shots of work crews assembling lighting and equipment onstage and groups of extras getting into costume, warming up for a shoot. This is followed by classic footage of Jagger, during which Michael Parkinson asks The Rolling Stones frontman how long he plans to make music. "I don't know. I never thought I'd be doing it for two years even," a young Jagger says, as the opening whistles of the Maroon 5 song kick in, throughout which a slew of Jagger look-alikes are shown dancing up to a central microphone, interlaced with archival footage of Jagger himself and shots of the Maroon 5 members James Valentine, Jesse Carmichael, Mickey Madden and Matt Flynn. When frontman Adam Levine eventually appears, he is shirtless, tattooed and wearing tight black pants. The video is mostly a mash-up of people trying to move like Jagger, including Levine. When Aguilera makes her brief appearance, she is dressed for a retro look with mascara-heavy lashes and a floppy hat.

=== Reception ===
The Huffington Post commented "We weren't sure whether Levine and Aguilera would be able to bring it like Mick, but then again, no one can ever touch the original. The best they can do is try to imitate Jagger's greatness—and Levine and Aguilera do a pretty solid job of that."

== Live performances ==
"Moves like Jagger" was performed for the first time with Aguilera on June 21, 2011, during The Voice, a talent competition show on which both she and Levine were coaches. Maroon 5 performed this song without Aguilera on America's Got Talent on August 3, 2011, in the results show of the fourth week of the Hollywood performances and the morning talk show The Today Show on August 5. The band later performed this song on Hands All Over Tour and the 2011 Summer Tour. On September 8, 2011, the song was performed live at the NFL pre-show on Lambeau Field in Green Bay, Wisconsin, before the start of the 2011 NFL season.

The song was also played during the band's appearances on The Ellen DeGeneres Show (September 21) and Saturday Night Live (November 5). On October 1, the band played the song at the Rock in Rio concert in Rio de Janeiro. In November 2011, Maroon 5 performed "Moves like Jagger" for the 2011 American Music Awards with Aguilera (the latter two along with a live performance of Gym Class Heroes's "Stereo Hearts" featuring Levine) and the 2011 Victoria's Secret Fashion Show. On November 13, 2011, Maroon 5 performed the song live at the Carnival Cruise Line, after the arrival of cruise ship Carnival Magic in Galveston, Texas. In June 2012, the band played "Moves like Jagger" at the Ed Sullivan Theater in New York, as part of the Live on Letterman concert series.

On February 3, 2019, Maroon 5 performed the song as the closing number of the Super Bowl LIII halftime show in Atlanta, Georgia. In September 2023, the band performed "Moves like Jagger" for the first edition of The Town Festival in Brazil. In July 2026, Maroon 5 played the song and serving as headliner for the 2026 BST Hyde Park concert at Hyde Park, London.

== Mac Miller remix ==
The song's official remix features both Aguilera and Pittsburgh-based rapper Mac Miller. It was first made available on September 29, 2011, via hip hop website HipHopDX.com, before being released officially via iTunes on October 4. The remix remains largely unchanged from the original song, with Miller's two verses each coming at the beginning of the track and prior to Aguilera's refrain respectively. Miller was asked to appear on the remix of "Moves like Jagger" by producer Benny Blanco, following consultation with Maroon 5 frontman Adam Levine. Blanco noted that,

"We were listening to [the song] and I was like, 'Yo, who could we put on this song?', because we were trying to get someone to do a remix. I was like, 'I know exactly who', because I just put Mac on another remix".

Miller later said that he hoped to be involved in an official music video for the track, but no video was announced, and any possible plans were shelved after his death in September 2018.

== Track listings ==
Digital download
No.	Title	Length
1.	"Moves like Jagger" (featuring Christina Aguilera)	3:21

German CD single
No.	Title	Length
1.	"Moves like Jagger" (featuring Christina Aguilera)	3:21
2.	"Moves like Jagger" (featuring Christina Aguilera) (Soul Seekerz Radio Edit)	3:25

== Charts ==
=== Weekly charts ===
Weekly chart performance
Chart (2011–2012)	Peak position
Australia (ARIA)	2
Austria (Ö3 Austria Top 40)	1
Belgium (Ultratop 50 Flanders)	4
Belgium (Ultratop 50 Wallonia)	4
Bulgaria Airplay (BAMP)	2
Canada Hot 100 (Billboard)	1
Canada AC (Billboard)	1
Canada CHR/Top 40 (Billboard)	1
Canada Hot AC (Billboard)	1
CIS Airplay (TopHit)	1
Croatia International Airplay (Top lista)	1
Czech Republic Airplay (ČNS IFPI)	2
Denmark (Tracklisten)	1
Euro Digital Song Sales (Billboard)	1
Europe (Nielsen Music Control)	1
Finland (Suomen virallinen lista)	1
France (SNEP)	3
Germany (GfK)	2
Hungary (Rádiós Top 40)	1
Ireland (IRMA)	1
Italy (FIMI)	2
Italian Airplay (EarOne)	3
Japan (Japan Hot 100)	30
Lebanon (Lebanese Top 20)	1
Mexico Airplay (Billboard)	1
Mexico Airplay (Monitor Latino)	1
Netherlands (Dutch Top 40)	1
Netherlands (Single Top 100)	2
New Zealand (Recorded Music NZ)	1
Norway (VG-lista)	1
Poland Airplay (ZPAV)	1
Poland (Nielsen Music Control)	2
Russia Airplay (TopHit)	1
Scottish Singles Sales (Official Charts)	1
Slovakia Airplay (ČNS IFPI)	1
South Korea International (Gaon Digital Chart)	1
Spain (Promusicae)	3
Spain Airplay (Nielsen Music Control)	1
Sweden (Sverigetopplistan)	1
Switzerland (Schweizer Hitparade)	5
Ukraine Airplay (TopHit)	3
UK Singles (Official Charts)	2
US Billboard Hot 100	1
US Adult Contemporary (Billboard)	7
US Adult Pop Airplay (Billboard)	1
US Dance Airplay (Billboard)	5
US Dance Club Songs (Billboard)	9
US Hot Latin Songs (Billboard)	8
US Pop Airplay (Billboard)	1
US Rhythmic Airplay (Billboard)	9
Venezuela Pop/Rock Airplay (Record Report)	1

2018 weekly chart performance
Chart (2018)	Peak position
Belarus Airplay (Eurofest)	181

2020s weekly chart performance
Chart (2023–2026)	Peak position
CIS Airplay (TopHit)	140
Estonia Airplay (TopHit)	191
Hungary (Rádiós Top 40)	33
Kazakhstan Airplay (TopHit)	58
Lithuania Airplay (TopHit)	84
Romania Airplay (TopHit)	195
Russia Airplay (TopHit)	180
Ukraine Airplay (TopHit)	176

=== Year-end charts ===
Annual chart rankings
Chart (2011)	Position
Australia (ARIA)	3
Austria (Ö3 Austria Top 40)	22
Belgium (Ultratop 50 Flanders)	21
Belgium (Ultratop 50 Wallonia)	47
Brazil (Crowley)	24
Canada (Canadian Hot 100)	5
CIS (TopHit)	12
Croatia International Airplay (HRT)	4
Denmark (Tracklisten)	1
Germany (Media Control AG)	15
Greece (IFPI)	45
Hungary (Rádiós Top 40)	13
Ireland (IRMA)	7
Israel (Media Forest)	5
Italy (FIMI)	9
Japan (Japan Hot 100)	56
Netherlands (Dutch Top 40)	3
Netherlands (Single Top 100)	6
New Zealand (RIANZ)	2
Russia Airplay (TopHit)	19
Spain (PROMUSICAE)	21
Sweden (Sverigetopplistan)	9
Switzerland (Schweizer Hitparade)	17
Ukraine Airplay (TopHit)	41
UK Singles (OCC)	2
US Billboard Hot 100	9
US Adult Contemporary (Billboard)	41
US Adult Top 40 (Billboard)	8
US Mainstream Top 40 (Billboard)	10
Chart (2012)	Position
Brazil (Crowley)	36
Canada (Canadian Hot 100)	17
France (SNEP)	76
Hungary (Rádiós Top 40)	18
Poland (ZPAV)	14
Russia Airplay (TopHit)	38
South Korea (Gaon)	55
Spain (PROMUSICAE)	33
Sweden (Sverigetopplistan)	71
Ukraine Airplay (TopHit)	77
UK Singles (OCC)	58
US Billboard Hot 100	36
US Adult Contemporary (Billboard)	12
US Adult Top 40 (Billboard)	27
US Dance/Mix Show Airplay (Billboard)	50
US Mainstream Top 40 (Billboard)	50
Chart (2013)	Position
France (SNEP)	198
Slovenia (SloTop50)	30

=== Decade-end charts ===
Decennium chart rankings
Chart (2010–2019)	Position
Australia (ARIA)	13
Ukrainian Airplay (TopHit)	190
UK Singles (Official Charts Company)	51
US Billboard Hot 100	20

=== All-time charts ===
All-time chart rankings
Chart (1958–2021)	Position
UK Singles (Official Charts Company)	36
US Billboard Hot 100	84
US Mainstream Top 40 (Billboard)	31

== Certifications and sales ==
Certifications and sales
Region	Certification	Certified units/sales
Australia (ARIA)	17× Platinum	1,190,000^{‡}
Belgium (BRMA)	Platinum	30,000^{*}
Brazil (Pro-Música Brasil)	5× Diamond	1,250,000^{‡}
Canada (Music Canada)	Diamond	800,000^{‡}
Denmark (IFPI Danmark)	4× Platinum	360,000^{‡}
Finland (Musiikkituottajat)	Platinum	10,022
France (SNEP)	Gold	150,000^{*}
Germany (BVMI)	5× Gold	750,000^{‡}
Italy (FIMI)	2× Platinum	60,000^{*}
Japan (RIAJ) PC download	Gold	100,000^{*}
New Zealand (RMNZ)	8× Platinum	240,000^{‡}
South Korea	—	5,000,000
Spain (Promusicae) 2011–2012 digital sales	Platinum	40,000^{*}
Spain (Promusicae) Sales + streams since 2015	2× Platinum	120,000^{‡}
Sweden (GLF)	5× Platinum	200,000^{‡}
Switzerland (IFPI Switzerland)	Platinum	30,000^{^}
United Kingdom (BPI)	5× Platinum	3,000,000^{‡}
United States (RIAA)	Diamond	10,000,000^{‡}
Streaming
Denmark (IFPI Danmark)	2× Platinum	200,000^{†}
Japan (RIAJ)	Gold	50,000,000^{†}
^{*} Sales figures based on certification alone.^{^} Shipments figures based on certification alone.^{‡} Sales+streaming figures based on certification alone.^{†} Streaming-only figures based on certification alone.

== Release history ==
Country	Date	Format	Ref.
Canada	June 21, 2011	Digital download	
United States	June 21, 2011	Digital download	
Australia	June 22, 2011	Digital download	
Denmark	June 22, 2011	Digital download	
France	June 22, 2011	Digital download	
Netherlands	June 22, 2011	Digital download	
New Zealand	June 22, 2011	Digital download	
Sweden	June 22, 2011	Digital download	
Australia	June 27, 2011	Contemporary hit radio	
Italy	July 1, 2011	Radio airplay	
United Kingdom	August 14, 2011	Digital download	
Germany	August 26, 2011	CD	

== See also ==
- List of best-selling singles in Australia
- List of number-one songs of 2011 (Russia)
