= La Cellera de Ter =

- Municipality
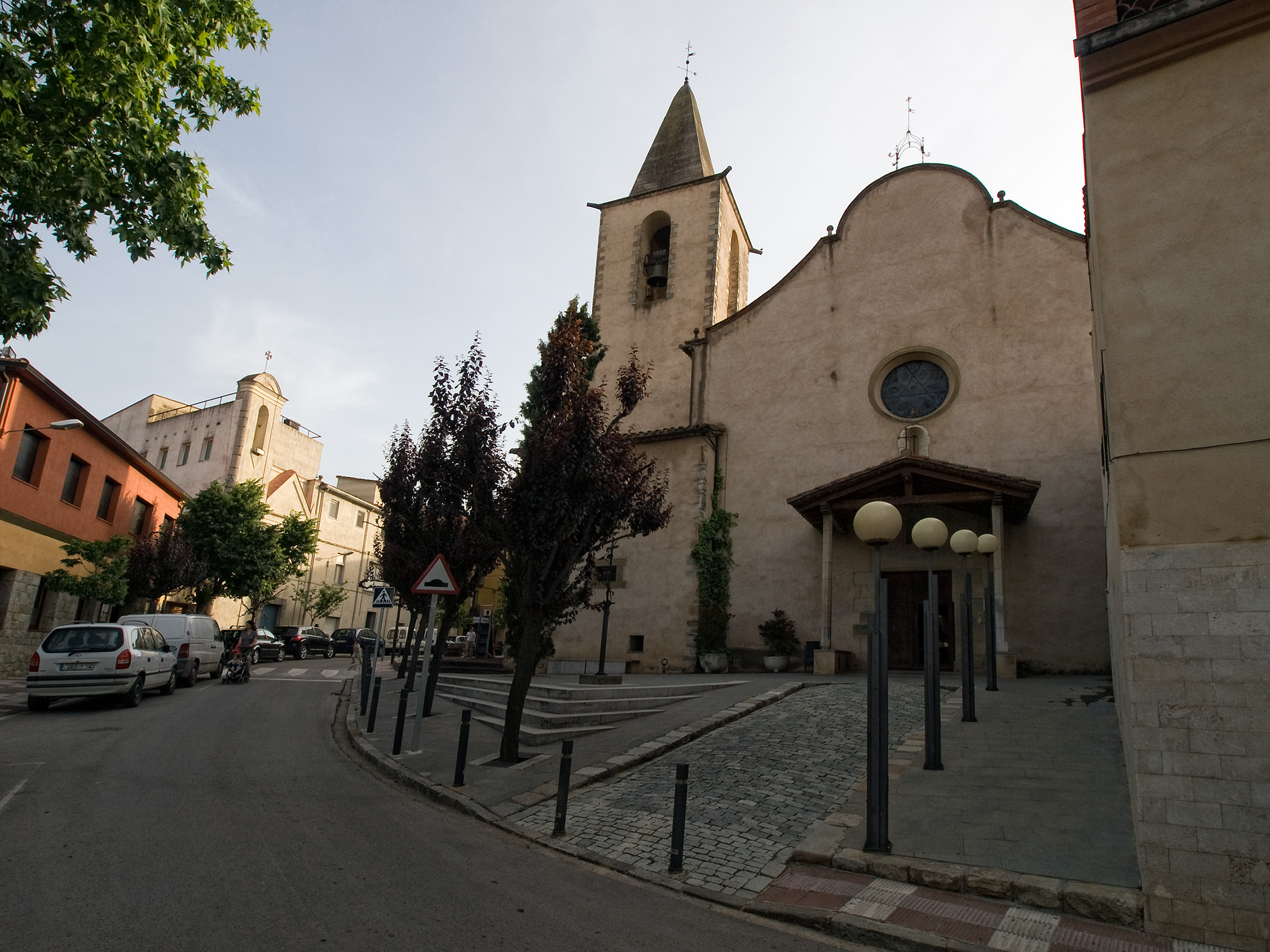
- Santa Maria de Sales church

- Coat of arms

- Location in Catalonia La Cellera de Ter (Spain)
- Coordinates: 41.968291°N 2.620736°E
- Country: Spain
- Community: Catalonia
- Province: Girona
- Comarca: Selva

Government
  - Mayor: David Sarsanedas Serrat (2015)

Area
  - Total: 14.6 km^{2} (5.6 sq mi)

Population (2025-01-01)
  - Total: 2,027
  - Density: 139/km^{2} (360/sq mi)
- Website: www.lacelleradeter.cat

La Cellera de Ter (Catalan pronunciation: [lə səˈʎeɾə ðə ˈtɛɾ]), also locally known simply as La Cellera, is a village in the county of La Selva, province of Girona and autonomous community of Catalonia, Spain. More than half of the area is mountainous and is part of the eastern ridge of the Guilleries massif. The municipality covers an area of 14.6 square kilometres (5.6 sq mi) and the population in 2014 was 2,071 and, in 2020, 1.950. The population density is 133,56 hab/km².

The village is 166 m above sea level. The highest mountain in the village is Sant Gregori (1088m) but the most representative one is Puigdefrou (843m).

Electronic music Sak Noel was born in the village in 1983.
