= List of number-one pop hits of 2012 (Brazil) =

Issue date	Song	Artist(s)	Reference
January	"Someone Like You"	Adele	
February	"Someone Like You"	Adele	
March	"Someone Like You"	Adele	
April	"Someone Like You"	Adele	
May	"Set Fire to the Rain"	Adele	
June	"Set Fire to the Rain"	Adele	
July	"Set Fire to the Rain"	Adele	
August	"Set Fire to the Rain"	Adele	
September	"Set Fire to the Rain"	Adele	
October	"Set Fire to the Rain"	Adele	
November	"Gangnam Style"	Psy	
December	"Gangnam Style"	Psy	
