= Paso (The Nini Anthem) =

Single by Sak Noel
- Released: 10 January 2012
- Recorded: 2011
- Genre: House
- Length: 3:17
- Label: Clipper's Sound
- Songwriter: Isaac Mahmood Noell
- Producer: Sak Noel

Sak Noel singles chronology
"Loca People" (2011)	"Paso (The Nini Anthem)" (2012)	"Where? (I Lost My Underwear)" (2012)

Music video
- "Paso (The Nini Anthem)" on YouTube

"Paso (The Nini Anthem)" is a song by Spanish disc jockey and producer Sak Noel featuring uncredited vocals from singer Viva Blahovic. It was released on 10 January 2012, was written and produced by Sak Noel. The song has peaked to number 45 on the Austrian Singles Chart.

== Music video ==
A music video to accompany the release of "Paso (The Nini Anthem)" was first released onto YouTube on 8 December 2011 at a total length of four minutes and twenty seconds.

== Track listings ==
Digital download

1. "Paso (The Nini Anthem)" [Radio Edit] – 3:17
2. "Paso (The Nini Anthem)" [Extended Version] - 4:02
3. "Paso (The Nini Anthem)" [Clean Radio Edit] - 3:18

UK Digital EP download

1. "Paso (The Nini Anthem)" [UK Edit] - 2:35
2. "Paso (The Nini Anthem)" [Radio Edit] – 3:17
3. "Paso (The Nini Anthem)" [Extended Mix] - 4:02
4. "Paso (The Nini Anthem)" [Kat Krazy Radio Edit] - 3:08
5. "Paso (The Nini Anthem)" [Kat Krazy Mix] - 4:21
6. "Paso (The Nini Anthem)" [XNRG Mix] - 4:37

German CD Single

1. "Paso (The Nini Anthem)" [Radio Edit] - 3:18
2. "Paso (The Nini Anthem)" [Extended Edit] - 4:03

== Charts ==
=== Weekly charts ===
Weekly chart performance for "Paso (The Nini Anthem)"
Chart (2012)	Peak position
Austria (Ö3 Austria Top 40)	45
CIS Airplay (TopHit)	11
Czech Republic Airplay (ČNS IFPI)	34
Poland Dance (ZPAV)	25
Russia Airplay (TopHit)	10
Ukraine Airplay (TopHit)	103

=== Year-end charts ===
Year-end chart performance for "Paso (The Nini Anthem)"
Chart (2012)	Position
CIS Airplay (TopHit)	65
Russia Airplay (TopHit)	58
