= Loca People =

2011 single by Sak Noel

Single by Sak Noel
- Released: 9 February 2011
- Recorded: 2010–11
- Genre: Electro house
- Length: 3:35
- Label: Clipper's Sound
- Songwriter: Sak Noel
- Producer: Sak Noel

Sak Noel singles chronology
"Loca People" (2011)	"Paso (The Nini Anthem)" (2012)

Music video
- "Loca People" on YouTube

Audio sample
- "Loca People": file; help

Original cover

"Loca People" (also known as "Loca People (La Gente Está Muy Loca)" or "Loca People (What the Fuck!)") is a song by Spanish DJ and record producer Sak Noel. Dutch singer Esthera Sarita performed the female vocals in the song. It was released in Spain on 9 February 2011 by Blanco y Negro Records, while the same day, the music video was shot on YouTube; in Italy, it was released on 3 March 2011 by Do it Yourself Music Group, then in most countries, it was released on 24 June 2011, but was released in the United Kingdom on 25 September 2011. It subsequently debuted at number one on the UK Singles Chart on 2 October 2011, giving Sak Noel his first UK number one single.

== Background ==
At a gig organised by Danish radio station The Voice, Noel explained the coincidence of how "Loca People" came about. "[Esthera Sarita] is the real singer behind the song 'Loca People'," he said. "She did the vocals one year ago in my studio and the story was very funny because I didn't know her, and one day she came to my studio, and I asked her 'do you mind singing some words in front of the mic?' so she did it. After that we didn't meet again for the reasons of life, and she was working as a waitress in a club. After that, and after making the song and having it on YouTube and everything, we met through Facebook. And now we're working together and travelling around the world."

== Critical reception ==
"Loca People" received mixed reception from music critics. Robert Copsey and Lewis Corner of Digital Spy were critical of the song, giving it one star of a possible five. In reference to the song's lyrics, the review read: "What the f**k?!" [sic] In contrast, Samantha McCallum of Maxumi Magazine provided a positive review of the track, stating it "will continue to carry the party on". "It seems as though the purpose of the song is to become a party ritual", McCallum commented. "If so, it works."

== Music video ==
The music video was filmed by Roger Martin Solé and was directed by Sak Noel. It was filmed in Barcelona, Spain in the nightclub venue Millennium & Cosmic Club in Girona (within the Polynuclear Urban Region of Barcelona), and features Desirée Brihuega and Noel himself. Besides the club scene, there are also outdoor scenes where the general public take part in the video.

== Track listing ==
- Digital download
1. "Loca People (What the Fuck!)" (Radio Edit) (Explicit) – 3:36
- US digital EP
1. "Loca People" (Radio Edit) – 3:35
2. "Loca People" (Original Mix) – 5:40
- German CD single
1. "Loca People (What the Fuck!)" (Radio Edit) (Explicit)
2. "Loca People (What the Fuck!)" (Explicit)
- UK digital download
1. "Loca People" (UK Radio Edit) – 2:13
2. "Loca People" (Original Mix) – 5:40
3. "Loca People" (Liam Keegan Radio Edit) – 2:54
4. "Loca People" (Liam Keegan Remix) – 5:26
5. "Loca People" (XNRG Mix) – 4:45

== Charts and certifications ==
=== Weekly charts ===
Chart (2011–12)	Peak position
Austria (Ö3 Austria Top 40)	1
Belgium (Ultratop 50 Flanders)	1
Belgium (Ultratop 50 Wallonia)	4
Canada (Canadian Hot 100)	40
CIS Airplay (TopHit)	2
Czech Republic Airplay (ČNS IFPI)	3
Denmark (Tracklisten)	1
Finland (Suomen virallinen lista)	4
France (SNEP)	12
Germany (GfK)	4
Greece Digital Songs (Billboard)	8
Hungary (Dance Top 40)	4
Hungary (Editors' Choice Top 40)	25
Ireland (IRMA)	14
Israel (Media Forest)	1
Italy (FIMI)	29
Mexico Anglo (Monitor Latino)	14
Netherlands (Dutch Top 40)	1
Netherlands (Single Top 100)	1
Norway (VG-lista)	6
Poland (Dance Top 50)	1
Romania (UPFR)	2
Russia (Digital Chart)	4
Russia Airplay (TopHit)	1
Scotland Singles (Official Charts)	1
Slovakia Airplay (ČNS IFPI)	22
Spain (Promusicae)	47
Sweden (Sverigetopplistan)	5
Switzerland (Schweizer Hitparade)	2
UK Singles (Official Charts)	1
UK Dance (Official Charts)	1
Ukraine Airplay (TopHit)	45
US Hot Dance Club Songs (Billboard)	49

=== Year-end charts ===
Chart (2011)	Position
Austrian Singles Chart	19
Belgium (Ultratop Flanders)	25
Belgium (Ultratop Wallonia)	91
CIS (Tophit)	46
Danish Singles Chart	19
Dutch Singles Chart	27
Dutch Single Top 100	11
German Singles Chart	44
Hungary (Dance Top 40)	9
Israeli Airplay Chart	4
Polish Dance Chart	1
Romania (Romanian Top 100)	56
Russia Airplay (TopHit)	29
Swedish Singles Chart	66
Swiss Singles Chart	30
UK Singles (Official Charts Company)	82

Year-end chart performance for "Loca People"
Chart (2012)	Position
Russia Airplay (TopHit)	170

=== Certifications ===
Region	Certification	Certified units/sales
Austria (IFPI Austria)	Gold	15,000^{*}
Belgium (BRMA)	Gold	15,000^{*}
Canada (Music Canada)	Platinum	80,000^{*}
Denmark (IFPI Danmark)	Platinum	30,000^{^}
Germany (BVMI)	Gold	150,000^{^}
Italy (FIMI)	Gold	15,000^{*}
Sweden (GLF)	2× Platinum	80,000^{‡}
Switzerland (IFPI Switzerland)	Gold	15,000^{^}
United Kingdom (BPI)	Silver	200,000^{*}
Streaming
Denmark (IFPI Danmark)	Gold	50,000^{†}
^{*} Sales figures based on certification alone.^{^} Shipments figures based on certification alone.^{‡} Sales+streaming figures based on certification alone.^{†} Streaming-only figures based on certification alone.

== Release history ==
Country	Date	Format	Label
Denmark	31 May 2011	Digital download	Blanco y Negro
United States	28 June 2011	Digital download	Ultra
Germany	29 July 2011	Digital download	Sony
Germany	26 August 2011	CD single	Sony
Ireland	24 September 2011	Digital download	3 Beat; All Around the World
United Kingdom	25 September 2011	Digital download	3 Beat; All Around the World

== CDM Chartbusters cover version ==
The same week Sak Noel's version made number one, a sound-alike version of "Loca People" by CDM Chartbusters made number 55.

== See also ==
- List of Dutch Top 40 number-one singles of 2011
- List of number-one dance singles of 2011 (Poland)
- List of number-one songs of 2011 (Russia)
