= Rolling in the Deep =

2010 single by Adele

Single by Adele

from the album 21
- B-side: "If It Hadn't Been for Love"
- Released: 29 November 2010
- Recorded: 2010
- Studio: Eastcote (London, England)
- Genre: Rhythm and blues; soul
- Length: 3:48
- Label: XL; Columbia
- Songwriters: Adele Adkins; Paul Epworth
- Producer: Paul Epworth

Adele singles chronology
"Water and a Flame" (2009)	"Rolling in the Deep" (2010)	"Someone like You" (2011)

Music video
- "Rolling in the Deep" on YouTube

"Rolling in the Deep" is a song by English singer-songwriter Adele from her second studio album, 21 (2011). It is the lead single and opening track on the album. The song was written by Adele and Paul Epworth. The singer herself describes it as a "dark blues-y gospel disco tune". In 2011, it was reportedly the biggest crossover hit in the United States since 1985; "Rolling in the Deep" gained radio airplay from many different radio formats. It was released on 29 November 2010 as the lead single from 21 in digital download format. The lyrics describe the emotions of a scorned lover.

"Rolling in the Deep" received widespread critical acclaim with praise drawn towards the song's production, its lyrics, and Adele's vocal performance. It represented a commercial breakthrough for Adele, propelling her to global superstardom. The song topped the charts in twelve countries and reached the top 10 in over twenty territories. It was Adele's first number-one song in the United States, reaching the top spot on many Billboard charts, including the Billboard Hot 100 where it was number one for seven weeks. By February 2012, "Rolling in the Deep" had sold over 8.7 million copies in the United States, making it the best-selling digital song by a female artist in the US, the second-best-selling digital song in the US and Adele's best-selling single outside her native country, topping her previous best-selling "Chasing Pavements". Worldwide, it was the fifth-best-selling digital single of 2011 with sales of 8.2 million copies. As of 2019, with sales of over 20.6 million copies worldwide, "Rolling in the Deep" is one of the best-selling digital singles of all-time. The song spent 65 weeks on the chart, making the song at that time the fourth-most weeks spent on the chart, tying the place with Jewel with her double single "Foolish Games"/"You Were Meant for Me".

Its music video received a leading seven nominations at the 2011 MTV Video Music Awards, including for Video of the Year, and won three other awards: Best Editing, Best Cinematography and Best Art Direction. "Rolling in the Deep" was also the Billboard Year End Hot 100 Number One Single of 2011. At the 54th Annual Grammy Awards, it won awards for Record of the Year, Song of the Year, and Best Short Form Music Video. Various critics and music publications ranked it as the best song of the year on their end-of-year lists with Rolling Stone ranking it at No. 8 spot on its list of "The 100 Greatest Songs of the 21st Century". In 2021, the song was ranked at number 82 on the list of Rolling Stone's 500 Greatest Songs of All Time.

== Background and composition ==
"Rolling in the Deep"
The chorus of "Rolling in the Deep"

In an interview, Adele expressed her initial reservations prior to meeting Paul Epworth due to their divergent musical styles; she characterised their collaboration as "a match made in heaven". She also credited Epworth for her increased vocal confidence, stating, "He brought a lot out of me. He brought my voice out as well—there's notes that I hit in that song ("Rolling in the Deep") that I never even knew I could hit." According to reviewer Bill Lamb, "Rolling in the Deep" features "martial beats, pounding piano keys and chanting backing singers". Adele's vocals have been described as having a "hint of Wanda Jackson's dirty-blues growl". According to Nadine Cheung from AOL Radio Blog the song is "sung from the perspective of a scorned lover, who is finally able to see the light, but despite regretful sentiments, reconciliation is not an option here." "Rolling in the Deep" is written in the key of C minor (B minor for live performances), in common time with a tempo of 105 beats per minute. The accompaniment uses open fifths, in a progression of C_{5}(i_{5})–G_{5}(v_{5})–B♭_{5}(VII_{5})–G_{5}(v_{5})–B♭_{5}(VII_{5}) and two Progressions of Progression #1: A♭(VI)-B♭(VII)-Gm(v)-A♭(VI)-B♭(VII)-A♭(VI)-B♭(VII)-Gm(v)-G(V), Progression #2: Cm(i)-B♭(VII)-A♭Maj7(VI M7)-B♭(VII). Adele's voice spans from B♭_{3} to D_{5}. Musically, Simon Reynolds of The New York Times described the song as "1960s rhythm-and-blues tightened up with modern production" and vocals rooted in soul. Rolling Stone also noted its "[buildup] to a gospel fever".

The song was reportedly inspired by a Nashville-schooled US tour bus driver, and composed by Epworth and Adele in a single afternoon following Adele's breakup with her boyfriend. It was "her reaction to, 'being told that my life was going to be boring and lonely and rubbish, and that I was a weak person if I didn't stay in the relationship. I was very insulted, and wrote that as a sort of "fuck you".'"

== Reception ==
=== Critical response ===
The song received universally rave reviews by critics. Lamb gave it a score of 5 out of 5, saying: "'Rolling in the Deep' [...] wastes no time in presenting the stunning bluesy authority of her voice...Here is a voice that can raise chills up the spine, and, when she is in a mood like this, the sense of foreboding will rivet your attention." Jason Lipshutz of Billboard magazine complimented the song's "sweeping chorus" and felt that the song "places a similar emphasis on its refrain but its multilayered instrumentation gives the English singer's wail a previously unheard depth". Lipshutz said, "Adele's noticeable leap in vocal confidence highlights the track. She gracefully lingers on the last line of the verses and attacks the sorrowful chorus' first words, 'We could have had it all,' head on." Rolling Stone magazine's Barry Walters stated, "'Rolling in the Deep' finds the 22-year-old in bluesy gospel mode, sounding powerful but not particularly pop. Starting with a stroked acoustic guitar, this breakup-mourning track builds to a stomping, hand-clapping climax that affirms the British knack for rejiggering the sound of American roots music."

The writers of Rolling Stone placed "Rolling in the Deep" at number one on their list of "50 Best Singles of 2011". Claire Suddath of Time magazine named "Rolling in the Deep" one of the Top 10 Songs of 2011. MTV chose the song as their "Song of the Year". The Village Voice's Pazz & Jop annual critics' poll ranked "Rolling in the Deep" as the top single of 2011. In 2019, Rolling Stone, Consequence of Sound, and Pitchfork ranked the song as the 3rd, 8th, and 171st best song of the 2010s, respectively. Time named it as one of the 10 best songs of the 2010s, and Billboard chose the song as one of the 100 "Songs That Defined the Decade". In 2021, Parade ranked the song number one on their list of the 25 greatest Adele songs, and in 2022, American Songwriter ranked the song number eight on their list of the 10 greatest Adele songs.

=== Chart performance ===
In the UK, "Rolling in the Deep" debuted at number 2 (her second number 2 debut, after "Chasing Pavements"), behind Bruno Mars's "Grenade". The song spent the first ten weeks of its chart run in the top ten.

Upon its American release, "Rolling in the Deep" became Adele's second single to chart in the country. The song debuted on the Billboard Hot 100 at number 68 on 25 December 2010. Later on, it became her first ever single to top a Billboard chart when it reached number one on the Hot Adult Top 40 Tracks chart in May 2011, and became her first number one hit in the country when it topped the Billboard Hot 100 in May 2011. As a result, Adele became the first British singer to have topped both the Billboard Hot 100 and Billboard 200 charts in the same week since Leona Lewis did the same back in 2008. In its 24th charting week, "Rolling in the Deep" stayed at number one, making it the latest single at the top since Lady Gaga's "Just Dance" spent its third and final week at number one in its 24th charting week as well. It stayed on top of the chart for seven straight weeks, the second longest run in 2011 behind Rihanna's "We Found Love", which spent eight weeks on top in 2011, and two weeks in 2012.

It has been certified 8× platinum, and in September 2011 became the first song to sell 5 million in digital sales, achieving the feat in 35 weeks, faster than any other song in digital history. As of October 2015, "Rolling in the Deep" sold 8.4 million digital copies in the United States, becoming the second-best-selling digital song overall and the best-selling digital song by a female artist. It was the second song to have crossed 8 million digital copies sold in the country. In France, despite not having been certified, the single has sold 348,900 copies and became one of the best-selling singles in France.

As of 26 July 2011, "Rolling in the Deep" was the third-best-selling digital single across Europe with 1.26 million copies sold. As of the 5 November 2011 issue of Billboard, it had been number one on the Adult Contemporary chart for 19 consecutive weeks. "Rolling in the Deep" became Adele's label XL Recordings' best-selling single, overtaking M.I.A.'s "Paper Planes" released in 2008 which until 2011 held the record. The song became also the longest-charting release in Finland, peaking at number one and charting for 50 weeks.

In 2013, as a celebration of the chart's 55th anniversary, Billboard counted down the 100 biggest Hot 100 hits ever, and the song was ranked at number 31. In 2018, it was placed at number 35.

In Australia, "Rolling in the Deep" entered the singles chart at number 40 in the week of 14 November 2010, and reached a peak position of number three where it remained for four weeks. In New Zealand, the song debuted at its peak position at number three, and was her highest-charting single in both countries until the release of her single "Someone Like You". The song achieved number one positions in Belgium (both Flanders & Wallonia), Finland, Germany, Portugal, Switzerland, and the Netherlands, remaining atop the Dutch Top 40 singles chart for seven weeks. It reached the top ten in Austria, Bulgaria, Denmark, France, Ireland, and Norway. It reached the top 20 in Sweden.

== Music video ==
The music video for "Rolling in the Deep", directed by Sam Brown, premiered on Channel 4 on 3 December 2010. The video begins in an abandoned house, where Adele is sitting in a chair singing. During the video, the scenes show hundreds of glasses filled with water that vibrate to the beat of a drum. Jennifer White, who also choreographed the sequence, dances in a room kicking up white flour. The drummer plays his drums under the stairs, and china is thrown breaking on a piece of suspended plywood at the bottom of a staircase. There is a white model of a city which is set on fire by five bursting light bulbs at the end of the song. The music video received critical acclaim, with critics praising its dark tone and simplicity.

On 20 July 2011, the music video was nominated for seven MTV Video Music Awards, including Video of the Year, Best Female Video, Best Pop Video and Best Direction, and won three for Best Editing, Best Cinematography and Best Art Direction. The video won the Grammy Award for Best Short Form Music Video on 12 February 2012.

== Accolades ==
"Rolling in the Deep" won Best Track at the 2011 Q Awards. At the 54th Annual Grammy Awards, "Rolling in the Deep" won in the categories of Record of the Year, Song of the Year, and Best Short Form Music Video, making it just the second song in Grammy history to win all three awards after We Are the World in 1986.

Year	Organization	Award	Result	Ref.
2011	BT Digital Music Awards	Best Song	Nominated	
2011	BT Digital Music Awards	Best Video	Nominated	
2011	GAFFA Awards	Best Foreign Song	Won	
2011	MTV Europe Music Awards	Best Song	Nominated	
2011	MTV Europe Music Awards	Best Video	Nominated	
2011	MTV Video Music Awards	Video of the Year	Nominated	
2011	MTV Video Music Awards	Best Female Video	Nominated	
2011	MTV Video Music Awards	Best Pop Video	Nominated	
2011	MTV Video Music Awards	Best Direction	Nominated	
2011	MTV Video Music Awards	Best Art Direction	Won	
2011	MTV Video Music Awards	Best Cinematography	Won	
2011	MTV Video Music Awards	Best Editing	Won	
2011	Q Awards	Best Track	Won	
2011	Soul Train Music Awards	The Ashford & Simpson Songwriter's Award	Nominated	
2011	Soul Train Music Awards	Song of the Year	Nominated	
2011	Teen Choice Awards	Choice Break-Up Song	Nominated	
2011	UK Music Video Awards	Best Pop Video	Won	
2011	UK Music Video Awards	Best Cinematography in a Video	Won	
2011	UK Music Video Awards	Best Art Direction and Design in a Video	Nominated	
2012	APRA Awards	International Work of the Year	Nominated	
2012	Billboard Music Awards	Top Hot 100 Song	Nominated	
2012	Billboard Music Awards	Top Radio Song	Nominated	
2012	Billboard Music Awards	Top Rock Song	Nominated	
2012	Billboard Music Awards	Top Streaming Song (Audio)	Won	
2012	Billboard Music Awards	Top Alternative Song	Won	
2012	Billboard Music Awards	Top Digital Song	Nominated	
2012	Billboard Music Awards	Top Pop Song	Nominated	
2012	BMI London Awards	Award Winning Song	Won	
2012	BMI London Awards	Song of the Year	Won	
2012	BMI Pop Awards	Award Winning Song	Won	
2012	Grammy Awards	Record of the Year	Won	
2012	Grammy Awards	Song of the Year	Won	
2012	Grammy Awards	Best Short Form Music Video	Won	
2012	Guinness World Records	Biggest-selling digital track in a calendar year in the US	Won	
2012	Ivor Novello Awards	PRS for Music Most Performed Work	Won	
2012	Ivor Novello Awards	Best Song Musically and Lyrically	Nominated	
2012	People's Choice Awards	Favorite Song of the Year	Nominated	
2012	People's Choice Awards	Favorite Music Video	Nominated	
2016	BMI London Awards	Million Performance Songs (4 Million)	Won	

== Promotion ==
Adele performed the song several times. On 25 November 2010, the singer appeared on Dutch presenter Paul de Leeuw's Madiwodovrij Show to perform the song for the first time. She also performed it on The Ellen DeGeneres Show in the United States on 3 December 2010. The song was also performed in front of the Royal Family at the Royal Variety Performance, on 9 December 2010; the performance was broadcast 16 December 2010. On Alan Carr: Chatty Man in the United Kingdom on 17 January 2011. On 21 January 2011, Adele performed "Rolling in the Deep" in the finale of The Voice of Holland where she also performed "Make You Feel My Love" with finalist Kim de Boer. On 26 January 2011, she performed the song in the French television show Le Grand Journal. The song has also been featured in a television spot for the 2011 film I Am Number Four, in which it is also featured. As part of a promotional tour in North America for the album, Adele performed the song on Late Show with David Letterman on 21 February 2011, on Jimmy Kimmel Live! on 24 February 2011, on 1 March 2011 on MTV Live, and Dancing with the Stars on 10 May 2011. On 12 February 2012, she made another rendition of the song at the 54th Grammy Awards.

== Media usage ==
"Rolling in the Deep" first gained attention when it was used in a trailer for the film I Am Number Four and in the film itself. It has since been featured in several television series such as in 90210's third season, in Doctor Who's sixth series premiere, in One Tree Hill's eighth season, in Gossip Girl's fourth-season finale, The Secret Life of the American Teenager's fourth season. and in the Scandal's Pilot promo. "Rolling in the Deep" was used as the theme song for E4's reality series Made in Chelsea and appeared in So You Think You Can Dance's eighth season during contestant Mitchell Kelly's solo performance. In Renny Harlin's 2016 film Skiptrace, a drunk Jackie Chan sang "Rolling in the Deep" at the tune of local instruments in a Mongolian village only to be taken by surprise by how the song was already popular among the non-English speaking locals, when they started to sing with him.

The instrumental of the song was used in Apple Inc's marketing video for the iPhone 4S. It was also featured in CBC's intro to Game 1 of the hockey 2011 Stanley Cup Finals between the Vancouver Canucks and the Boston Bruins. while the song's instrumentals were played heavily in promos during the 2011 NBA draft. The song was played in the background during the parade of athletes at the 2012 Summer Olympics.

In early 2016, US businessman and media personality Donald Trump began using "Rolling in the Deep" as warm-up music at rallies during his campaign to become that year's Republican Party candidate for President of the United States, prompting Adele to issue a statement distancing herself from Trump. A spokesperson for the singer confirmed that "Adele has not given permission for her music to be used for any political campaigning". The song is one of two by Adele that Trump used as part of his campaign, the other being "Skyfall". Trump continued to use the songs despite Adele's objections. Commentators, including David Lister of The Independent, have noted that United States Copyright law does not prevent politicians from using pieces of music at their rallies, providing the venue has a public performance licence.

== Track listing ==
- Digital download
1. "Rolling in the Deep" – 3:48
- Digital EP
1. "Rolling in the Deep" – 3:48
2. "Rolling in the Deep (Jamie xx Shuffle)" – 4:17
3. "Rolling in the Deep (Acapella)" – 3:56
- CD single
1. "Rolling in the Deep" – 3:48
2. "If It Hadn't Been for Love" (written by Mike Henderson and Chris Stapleton) – 3:09

== Credits and personnel ==
- Lead vocals, backing vocals, stiletto heel tapping – Adele
- Songwriting – Adele Adkins, Paul Epworth
- Production, Bass guitar, acoustic guitar, electric guitar, percussion and backing vocals – Paul Epworth
- Mixing – Tom Elmhirst
- Mixing assistant – Dan Parry
- Piano – Neil Cowley
- Drums – Leo Taylor
- Recording Engineer – Mark Rankin
- Mastering – Tom Coyne

Credits adapted from 21 liner notes:

== Charts ==
=== Weekly charts ===
Weekly chart performance for "Rolling in the Deep"
Chart (2010–2026)	Peak position
Australia (ARIA)	3
Austria (Ö3 Austria Top 40)	3
Belgium (Ultratop 50 Flanders)	1
Belgium (Ultratop 50 Wallonia)	1
Brazil (Billboard Hot 100 Airplay)	3
Brazil (Billboard Hot Pop)	1
Canada Hot 100 (Billboard)	1
CIS Airplay (TopHit)	64
Croatia International Airplay (Top lista)	2
Czech Republic Airplay (ČNS IFPI)	16
Czech Republic Singles Digital (ČNS IFPI)	54
Denmark (Tracklisten)	3
Europe (Euro Digital Songs)	2
Finland (Suomen virallinen lista)	1
Finnish Airplay (Radiosoittolista)	34 (Note: IFPI Finland's airplay chart was introduced in 2013, three years after the song's release. The song's peak was in 2020.)
France (SNEP)	3
Germany (GfK)	1
Global 200 (Billboard)	42 (Note: The Global 200 was introduced in September 2020, almost a decade after "Rolling in the Deep"'s prime charting period.)
Greece Digital Songs (Billboard)	4
Hungary (Rádiós Top 40)	2
Hungary (Single Top 40)	25
Iceland (RÚV)	1
Ireland (IRMA)	2
Israel International Airplay (Media Forest)	2
Italy (FIMI)	1
Kazakhstani Airplay (TopHit)	41
Japan Hot 100 (Billboard)	6
Luxembourg Digital Songs (Billboard)	1
Mexico (Billboard Mexican Airplay)	25
Mexico Anglo (Monitor Latino)	3
Moldova Airplay (TopHit)	61
Netherlands (Dutch Top 40)	1
Netherlands (Single Top 100)	1
New Zealand (Recorded Music NZ)	3
Norway (VG-lista)	8
Poland Airplay (ZPAV)	5
Portugal Digital Songs (Billboard)	2
Romanian Airplay (TopHit)	162
Russia Airplay (TopHit)	69
Scottish Singles Sales (Official Charts)	2
Slovakia Airplay (ČNS IFPI)	10
Slovenia (Slovenian Singles Chart)	2
South Africa (RISA)	77
South Korea Digital Chart (Gaon)	37
South Korea International Chart (Gaon)	2
Spain (Promusicae)	5
Sweden (Sverigetopplistan)	11
Switzerland (Schweizer Hitparade)	1
Ukraine Airplay (TopHit)	90
UK Singles (Official Charts)	2
UK Indie (Official Charts)	1
US Billboard Hot 100	1
US Adult Contemporary (Billboard)	1
US Adult Pop Airplay (Billboard)	1
US Dance Club Songs (Billboard)	14
US Dance Airplay (Billboard)	2
US Hot R&B/Hip-Hop Songs (Billboard)	61
US Rock & Alternative Airplay (Billboard)	15
US Hot Rock & Alternative Songs (Billboard)	15
US Latin Pop Airplay (Billboard)	16
US Pop Airplay (Billboard)	1
US Rhythmic Airplay (Billboard)	12

=== Monthly charts ===
2011 monthly chart performance for "Rolling in the Deep"
Chart (2011)	Peak position
CIS Airplay (TopHit)	74
Russia Airplay (TopHit)	75

2024 monthly chart performance for "Rolling in the Deep"
Chart (2024)	Peak position
Kazakhstan Airplay (TopHit)	41

=== Year-end charts ===
2010 year-end chart performance for "Rolling in the Deep"
Chart (2010)	Position
Netherlands (Dutch Top 40)	121
Netherlands (Single Top 100)	36

2011 year-end chart performance for "Rolling in the Deep"
Chart (2011)	Position
Australia (ARIA)	5
Austria (Ö3 Austria Top 40)	16
Belgium (Ultratop 50 Flanders)	2
Belgium (Ultratop 40 Wallonia)	1
Brazil (Crowley)	11
Canada (Canadian Hot 100)	1
Croatia International Airplay (HRT)	14
Denmark (Hitlisten)	10
France (SNEP)	2
Germany (Media Control Charts)	4
Greece (IFPI)	19
Hungary (Mahasz)	1
Iceland (Tónlist)	20
Ireland (IRMA)	11
Israel (Media Forest)	2
Italy (FIMI)	5
Netherlands (Dutch Top 40)	2
Netherlands (Single Top 100)	1
New Zealand (Recorded Music NZ)	6
Spain (PROMUSICAE)	18
South Korea (Gaon Singles Chart) (Int'l.)	11
Sweden (Sverigetopplistan)	8
Switzerland (Schweizer Hitparade)	2
UK Singles (Official Charts Company)	9
US Billboard Hot 100	1
US Pop Songs (Billboard)	5
US Adult Contemporary (Billboard)	3
US Adult Pop Songs (Billboard)	1
US Hot Rock Songs (Billboard)	45

2012 year-end chart performance for "Rolling in the Deep"
Chart (2012)	Position
Belgium (Ultratop 50 Flanders)	51
Belgium (Ultratop 40 Wallonia)	32
Canada (Canadian Hot 100)	61
France (SNEP)	38
Hungary (Mahasz)	41
Israel (Media Forest ACUM)	6
Italy (FIMI)	61
Russia Airplay (TopHit)	189
South Korea (Gaon Singles Chart) (Int'l.)	3
Spain (PROMUSICAE)	25
Switzerland (Schweizer Hitparade)	34
US Billboard Hot 100	71
US Adult Contemporary (Billboard)	22

2013 year-end chart performance for "Rolling in the Deep"
Chart (2013)	Position
Slovenia (SloTop50)	17
South Korea (Gaon Singles Chart) (Int'l.)	31

2014 year-end chart performance for "Rolling in the Deep"
Chart (2014)	Position
South Korea (Gaon Singles Chart) (Int'l.)	65

2015 year-end chart performance for "Rolling in the Deep"
Chart (2015)	Position
South Korea (Gaon Singles Chart) (Int'l.)	39

2016 year-end chart performance for "Rolling in the Deep"
Chart (2016)	Position
South Korea (Gaon Singles Chart) (Int'l.)	30

2017 year-end chart performance for "Rolling in the Deep"
Chart (2017)	Position
South Korea (Gaon Singles Chart) (Int'l.)	51

2018 year-end chart performance for "Rolling in the Deep"
Chart (2018)	Position
South Korea (Gaon Singles Chart) (Int'l.)	68

2022 year-end chart performance for "Rolling in the Deep"
Chart (2022)	Position
Global Excl. US (Billboard)	182

2023 year-end chart performance for "Rolling in the Deep"
Chart (2023)	Position
Global Excl. US (Billboard)	159
Kazakhstan Airplay (TopHit)	173

2024 year-end chart performance for "Rolling in the Deep"
Chart (2024)	Position
Kazakhstan Airplay (TopHit)	47

Year-end chart performance
Chart (2025)	Position
Argentina Anglo Airplay (Monitor Latino)	56

=== Decade-end charts ===
2010s-end chart performance for "Rolling in the Deep"
Chart (2010–2019)	Position
Australia (ARIA)	12
Netherlands (Single Top 100)	7
UK Singles (Official Charts Company)	73
US Billboard Hot 100	10

=== All-time charts ===
All-time chart performance
Chart	Position
Netherlands (Single Top 100)	12
UK Singles (Official Charts Company)	129
US Billboard Hot 100 (1958-2021)	39

== Certifications and sales ==
Certifications and sales
Region	Certification	Certified units/sales
Australia (ARIA)	7× Platinum	490,000^{^}
Belgium (BRMA)	4× Platinum	80,000^{‡}
Brazil (Pro-Música Brasil)	3× Diamond	750,000^{‡}
Canada (Music Canada)	Diamond	800,000^{‡}
Denmark (IFPI Danmark)	3× Platinum	270,000^{‡}
France	—	347,000
Germany (BVMI)	Platinum	300,000^{^}
Italy (FIMI)	4× Platinum	120,000^{*}
Mexico (AMPROFON)	4× Platinum+Gold	270,000^{*}
New Zealand (RMNZ)	7× Platinum	210,000^{‡}
Norway (IFPI Norway)	2× Platinum	120,000^{‡}
Portugal (AFP)	Platinum	20,000^{‡}
South Korea (Circle Chart)	—	4,020,193
Spain (Promusicae)	3× Platinum	180,000^{‡}
Sweden (GLF)	3× Platinum	120,000^{‡}
Switzerland (IFPI Switzerland)	3× Platinum	90,000^{^}
United Kingdom (BPI)	5× Platinum	3,000,000^{‡}
United States (RIAA)	8× Platinum	8,400,000
United States (RIAA) Mastertone	Gold	500,000^{*}
Streaming
Greece (IFPI Greece)	Gold	1,000,000^{†}
^{*} Sales figures based on certification alone.^{^} Shipments figures based on certification alone.^{‡} Sales+streaming figures based on certification alone.^{†} Streaming-only figures based on certification alone.

== Release history ==
Release dates for "Rolling in the Deep"
Region	Date	Format
Netherlands	29 November 2010	Digital download
United States	30 November 2010	Digital download
Japan	22 December 2010	Digital download
Switzerland	27 December 2010	Digital download
Germany	27 December 2010	Digital download
Austria	27 December 2010	Digital download
Australia	10 January 2011	Contemporary hit radio
Germany	14 January 2011	CD single
Australia	16 January 2011	Digital EP
United Kingdom	16 January 2011	Digital EP
Ireland	16 January 2011	Digital EP
New Zealand	16 January 2011	Digital EP
Belgium	16 January 2011	Digital EP
Switzerland	16 January 2011	Digital EP
Portugal	16 January 2011	Digital EP
Australia	16 January 2011	Digital EP
Austria	16 January 2011	Digital EP
France	16 January 2011	Digital EP
Germany	16 January 2011	Digital EP
Denmark	16 January 2011	Digital EP
Canada	16 January 2011	Digital EP
Finland	16 January 2011	Digital EP
Greece	16 January 2011	Digital EP
Spain	16 January 2011	Digital EP
Italy	16 January 2011	Digital EP
Norway	16 January 2011	Digital EP
Luxembourg	16 January 2011	Digital EP
Netherlands	16 January 2011	Digital EP
Sweden	16 January 2011	Digital EP
Japan	16 January 2011	Digital EP
United Kingdom	17 January 2011	CD single
United States	1 February 2011	Digital download – Jamie XX Shuffle remix
United States	8 March 2011	Mainstream airplay
United States	26 July 2011	Urban contemporary airplay

== Cover versions ==
=== Linkin Park version ===
"Rolling in the Deep"

Promotional single by Linkin Park

from the album iTunes Festival: London 2011
- Released: 8 July 2011
- Recorded: 2011
- Genre: Alternative rock
- Length: 4:24
- Label: Warner Bros.
- Songwriters: Adele; Paul Epworth
- Producers: Mike Shinoda; Rick Rubin

Music video
- Rolling in the Deep (Live Cover) Promotional video on YouTube

"Rolling in the Deep" was covered by American rock band Linkin Park and was included on their live EP, iTunes Festival. It has entered the UK Rock Singles Charts at number 1, and UK Singles chart at number 42 although it has not been released as a single. The song was covered twice by the band, one was a LPU meeting and one was in The Roundhouse during the 2011 iTunes Festival. The song was well received by the UK. "Rolling in the Deep" was sent to alternative radio stations as a promotional single on 8 July 2011. Performed as an acoustic version of the song as part of their set, with Chester Bennington as the lead vocalist and Mike Shinoda on the piano. This recording was released to the iTunes Store as a single.

==== Charts ====
Chart (2012)	Peak position
Scottish Singles Sales (Official Charts)	48
UK Singles (Official Charts)	42
UK Rock & Metal (Official Charts)	1

=== Aretha Franklin version ===
"Rolling in the Deep (The Aretha Version)"

Single by Aretha Franklin

from the album Aretha Franklin Sings the Great Diva Classics
- Released: 29 September 2014
- Genre: Soul
- Length: 4:00
- Label: RCA
- Songwriters: Adele Adkins, Paul Epworth, Nickolas Ashford, Valerie Simpson
- Producers: Kenny "Babyface" Edmonds, Antonio Dixon, Clive Davis, Aretha Franklin

Aretha Franklin singles chronology
"Put You Up on Game" (2007)	"Rolling in the Deep (The Aretha Version)" (2014)

In 2014, Aretha Franklin covered the song on her Aretha Franklin Sings the Great Diva Classics album. The performance may be termed a mash-up or medley as it includes the chorus from "Ain't No Mountain High Enough" written by singer-songwriters Ashford & Simpson.

It was released 29 September 2014 as the collection's lead single. This version peaked at number one on the US dance chart, giving Aretha Franklin her sixth number one on the chart. It also debuted at number 47 on the Billboard Hot R&B/Hip-Hop Songs chart. Franklin thus became the first female, and fourth artist overall (following Lil Wayne, Jay-Z and James Brown), to place 100 songs on the charts (with her first entry on the chart being "Today I Sing the Blues" in 1960). This version of "Rolling in the Deep" entitled "Rolling in the Deep (The Aretha Version)" was Franklin's final single to be released before her retirement in 2017, and her death the following year.

==== Charts ====
Chart (2014–15)	Peak position
US Adult R&B Songs (Billboard)	30
US Dance Club Songs (Billboard)	1
US Hot R&B/Hip-Hop Songs (Billboard)	47

=== Greta Van Fleet version ===
In January 2018, American rock band Greta Van Fleet released a cover of "Rolling in the Deep" with a partnership with Spotify after being invited to record at Spotify Studios in New York City.

The song was released along with an acoustic version of "Black Smoke Rising" on digital media on 24 January 2018. The song did not chart but the band will play it at live performances occasionally.

=== Other covers ===
The Piano Guys adapted the melody for piano and cello in a mashup with the orchestral suite "Jupiter" by Gustav Holst. Japanese rock duo Glim Spanky covered the song for their 2014 EP Shōsō.

The song became popular and has been covered by various artists including David Cook, Ariana Grande, Haley Reinhart, Nicole Scherzinger, The Overtones and rapper Lil Wayne. In January 2011, Jamie xx remixed the song, on top of which Childish Gambino later added a rap verse. In February 2011, Mike Posner released a cover of the song. Idolator described his version as "a very cool electronic piece that still somehow manages to retain the heartbroken feel of Adele's original tune." The same month, Scottish band Kassidy also covered the song. John Legend uploaded an R&B a cappella version of the song in April 2011 on SoundCloud. "Rolling in the Deep" was then covered by Lea Michele and Jonathan Groff of Glee for the second season episode "Prom Queen". The single charted at number 29 on the Billboard Hot 100 and at 49 on the UK Singles Chart and was later released on the album Glee: The Music, Volume 6. Black Stone Cherry have covered the song live on several occasions, and it was covered by Celine Dion on her Las Vegas Show.

On 14 July 2011, Patti Smith covered "Rolling in the Deep" during a performance at the Castle Clinton. In July 2011, PS22 Chorus sang the song at the Newport Folk Festival. On October 2011, Misha B performed a "show-stopping" cover of the track on the eighth season of The X Factor, regarded by the Daily Telegraph as one of the highlights of the series. The Telegraph noted that Misha B delivered "impressive soulful vocals and a quirky rapping style" injecting it with a "fresh UK urban twist". Mexican sibling trio Vázquez Sounds released a cover version which quickly became popular on YouTube. It was later released as a single in Mexico and was certified platinum by AMPROFON. On 12 June 2012, Celine Dion covered the song at her Vegas show at The Colosseum at Caesars Palace, before she performed the song, she told the crowd, "I love Adele so much. She's amazing." A cover by metalcore band Amyst was played to Adele by Jonathan Ross on his TV show in September 2011, to a poor reception from Adele, who along with Ross dismissed it as "screamo".

In May 2015, Aryan Simhadri uploaded a video of his cover of the song to his YouTube channel. The cover surged in popularity in 2023 and 2024 due to Simhadri's leading role as Grover Underwood in the Disney+ series Percy Jackson and the Olympians often paired with other clips of the show's young cast members in the form of an Internet meme.

On 9 March 2021, La Poem performed the song in the 7th episode of Phantom Singer All Stars.

== See also ==
- List of best-selling singles
- List of best-selling singles in South Korea
- List of best-selling singles in the United States
- List of best-selling singles in Australia
- List of Dutch Top 40 number-one singles of 2011
- List of Hot 100 number-one singles of 2011 (Canada)
- List of Hot 100 number-one singles of 2011 (U.S.)
- List of Mainstream Top 40 number-one hits of 2011 (U.S.)
- List of number-one adult contemporary singles of 2011 (U.S.)
- List of number-one Adult Top 40 singles of 2011
- List of number-one dance singles of 2015 (U.S.)
- List of number-one hits of 2011 (Germany)
- List of number-one hits of 2011 (Italy)
- List of number-one hits of 2011 (Switzerland)
- List of number-one pop hits of 2011 (Brazil)
- List of number-one singles of 2012 (Finland)
- List of Ultratop 40 number-one singles of 2011
- List of Ultratop 50 number-one singles of 2011
