= Sak Noel =

Spanish DJ and record producer

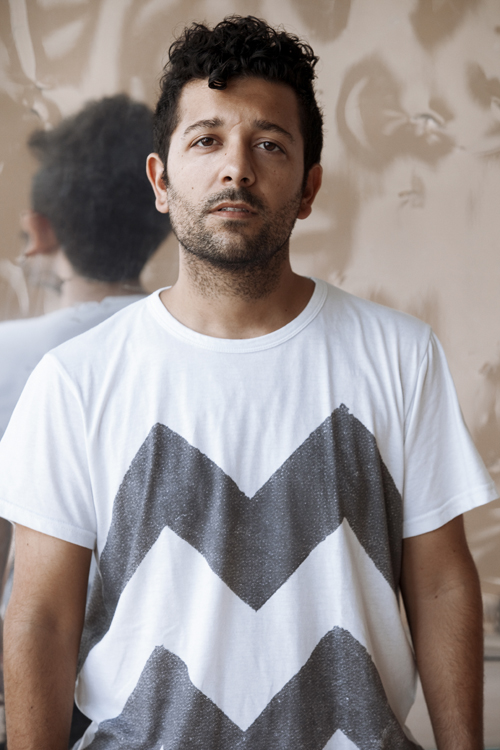

Background information
- Also known as: Sak Noel
- Born: Isaac Mahmood Noell; 12 April 1983 (age 43); La Cellera de Ter, Girona, Catalonia, Spain
- Genres: House; trap; Latin; hip hop
- Occupations: DJ; record producer; songwriter; music video director
- Years active: 2007–present
- Labels: Barnaton; Ultra; Sony; Clipper's Sound; Mad Decent; Spinnin' Records
- Website: www.saknoel.com

Isaac Mahmood Noell (born 12 April 1983 in La Cellera de Ter, Catalonia), professionally known as Sak Noel, is a Spanish DJ, record producer, songwriter and music video director. He is best known for the international hit "Loca People".

Sak Noel's interest in music began in his adolescence, with involvement in the electronic music scene in Catalonia and the founding of Moguda, an entertainment company in 2003.

He released his first single, "Loca People", in 2011; it was a worldwide hit, attaining #1 ranking in various countries, including the UK. He was the fifth Spaniard to reach that ranking. The remix of "Loca People" with Sensato and Pitbull "Crazy People" was nominated for Best Urban Song 13th Latin Grammy Awards in 2012.

His second single, "Paso (The Nini Anthem)", obtained more than 30 million views on YouTube. He then released "No Boyfriend" in 2014, in collaboration with Mayra Veronica, which also obtained more than 30 million views on YouTube and went viral in the US. The song debuted at #40 on the Billboard Dance/Mix Show Airplay rankings.

== Discography ==
=== Singles ===
Title	Year	Peak chart positions										Certifications
Title	Year	ESP	AUT	BEL	DEN	FRA	IRE	NLD	SWE	SWI	UK	Certifications
"Loca People"	2011	47	1	1	1	12	14	1	5	2	1	CAN: Platinum; DEN: Platinum; SWI: Gold
"Paso (The Nini Anthem)"	2011	—	45	—	—	—	—	—	—	—	—	
"Where? (I Lost My Underwear)"	2012	—	—	—	—	—	—	—	—	—	—	
"Party On My Level" (featuring Sito Rocks)	2013	—	—	—	—	—	—	—	—	—	—	
"I am the Law"	2013	—	—	77	—	—	—	—	—	—	—	
"No Boyfriend (No Problem)" (featuring Mayra Veronica, DJ Kuba and Neitan)	2014	—	—	—	—	—	—	—	—	—	—	
"Pinga" (featuring Sito Rocks)	2015	—	—	—	—	—	—	—	—	—	—	
"Trumpets" (with Salvi featuring Sean Paul)	2016	—	—	40	—	106	—	12	—	—	—	
"Tocame" (with Salvi and Franklin Dam)	2020	—	—	—	—	—	—	—	—	—	—	
"Bruk It Down" (with Kshmr featuring Txtheway)	2020	—	—	—	—	—	—	—	—	—	—	
"Que Rica (Tocame)" (with Pitbull and Salvi)	2020	—	—	—	—	—	—	—	—	—	—	
"Tembleque" (with Nosfe and Alexandra Stan featuring Los Tioz)	2021	—	—	—	—	—	—	—	—	—	—	
"Never Going Home" (with Jasmine Ortiz)	2022	—	—	—	—	—	—	—	—	—	—	
"—" denotes a recording that did not chart or was not released.

=== Remixes and other versions ===
- "Esta Es Mi Fiesta" (Sak Noel Remix) — Xana
- "Paso (The Nini Anthem)" (Remix) (with Sito Rocks)
- "Loca People" (Remix) (with Pitbull and Sensato)
- "Literally I Can't" (Remix) (with Redfoo)
- "Pierdo La Cabeza" (Remix) (with Zion & Lennox)
- "Bajo El Mismo Sol" (Remix) (with Jennifer Lopez and Alvaro Soler)
- "Gimme Gimme" (Remix) (with Inna)
- "Cold" (Sak Noel Remix) — Maroon 5
- "Further Up (Na, Na, Na, Na, Na)" (Sak Noel Remix) — Static & Ben El featuring Pitbull
