= List of songs recorded by Maroon 5 =

Maroon 5 songs
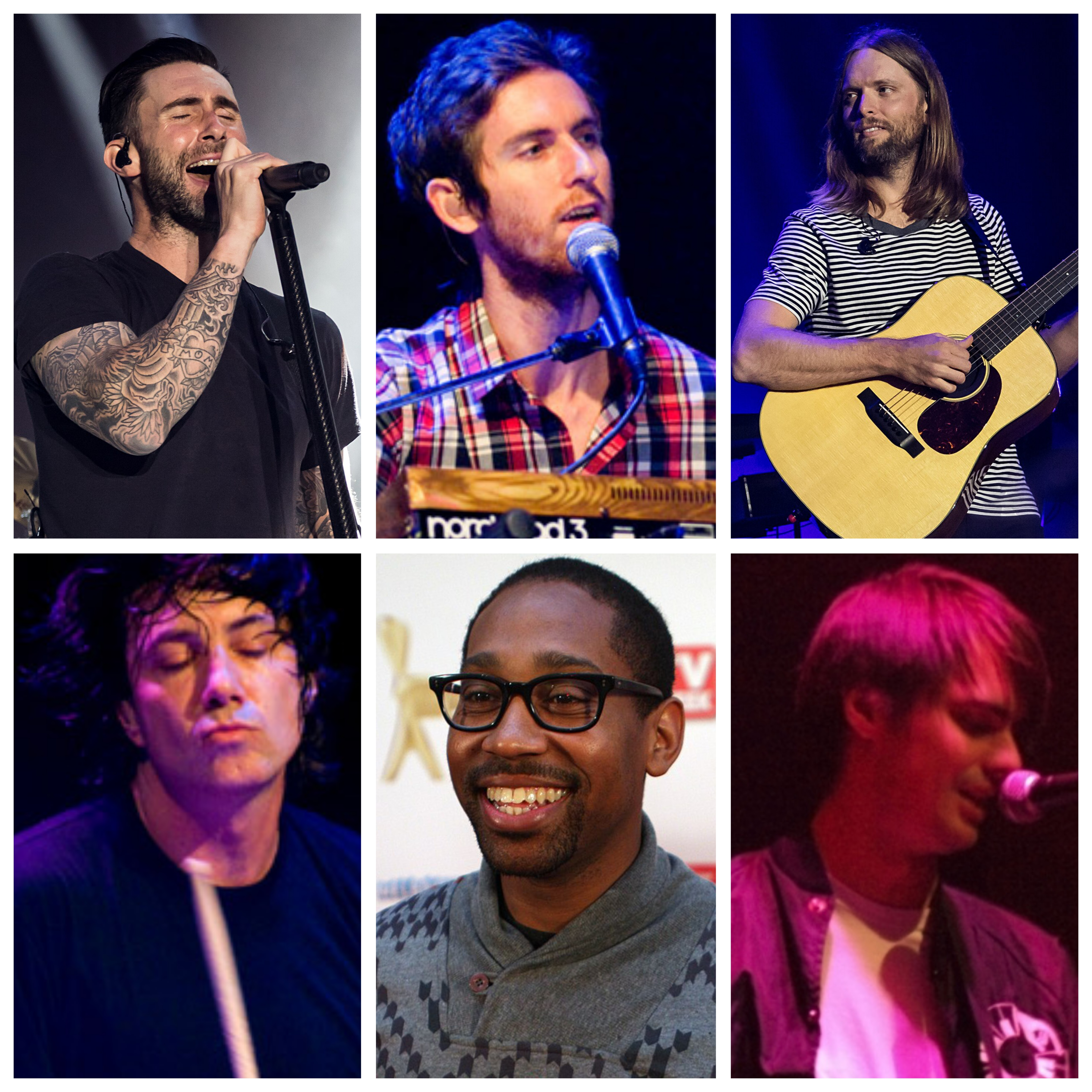

This is a list of songs by American pop rock band Maroon 5.

== Original songs ==
Title	Album/Single	Year	Writer(s)
"All Night"	Love Is Like	2025	Adam Levine, Sam Farrar, James Valentine, Jacob Kasher Hindlin, Federico Vindver, Michael Pollack
"Animals"	V	2014	Adam Levine, Shellback, Benjamin Levin
"Back At Your Door"	It Won't Be Soon Before Long	2007	Adam Levine, Jesse Carmichael
"Beautiful Goodbye"	Overexposed	2012	Adam Levine, Benjamin Levin, Ammar Malik
"Beautiful Mistakes" (featuring Megan Thee Stallion)	Jordi	2021	Adam Levine, Megan Pete, Jacob Kasher Hindlin, Joseph Kirkland, Andrew Goldstein, Matthew Musto
"Better That We Break"	It Won't Be Soon Before Long	2007	Adam Levine
"Bet My Heart"	Red Pill Blues	2017	Adam Levine
"Best 4 U"	Red Pill Blues	2017	Adam Levine, Julien Bunetta, John Ryan, Jacob Kasher Hindlin, Alexander Izquerdio, Andrew Haas, Ian Franzino
"Button" (featuring Anuel AA & Tainy)	Jordi (Deluxe)	2021	Adam Levine, Emmanuel Gazmey Santiago, Marco Masís, Jacob Kasher Hindlin, Bellion, Pollack, Alejandro Borrero, Ivanni Rodríguez, Johnny Simpson, Ricardo Lopez
"Can't Leave You Alone" (featuring Juice Wrld)	Jordi	2021	Adam Levine, Jarad Higgins, Jacob Kasher Hindlin, Andrew Wotman, Louis Bell
"Can't Stop"	It Won't Be Soon Before Long	2007	Adam Levine, James Valentine
"Cold" (featuring Future)	Red Pill Blues (Deluxe / Japanese Edition)	2017	Adam Levine, John Ryan, Jacob Kasher Hindlin, Justin Tranter, Phil Shaouy
"Coming Back for You"	V	2014	Adam Levine, Jason Evigan, Jason Gregory Evigan, Jordon Kendall Johnson, Marcus Lomax, Samuel Martin, Stefan Johnson
"Convince Me Otherwise" (with H.E.R.)	Jordi	2021	Adam Levine, Gabriella Wilson, Jacob Kasher Hindlin, Jerry Edouard, Henry Walter, Lennon Kloser
"Closure"	Red Pill Blues	2017	Adam Levine, John Ryan, Jacob Kasher Hindlin, Ammar Malik, Phil Shaouy
"Daylight"	Overexposed	2012	Adam Levine, Samuel Denison Martin, Max Martin, Mason David Levy
"Denim Jacket"	Red Pill Blues (Deluxe / Japanese Edition)	2017	Adam Levine, James Alan Ghaleb, Peter Kelleher, Tom Barnes, Ben Kohn, Oscar Gorres, Jacob Kasher Hindlin
"Doin' Dirt"	Overexposed	2012	Adam Levine, Shellback
"Don't Know Nothing"	Hands All Over	2010	Adam Levine, Sam Farrar
"Don't Wanna Know" (featuring Kendrick Lamar)	Red Pill Blues (Deluxe / Japanese Edition)	2016	Adam Levine, Kendrick Lamar
"Echo" (featuring Blackbear)	Jordi	2021	Adam Levine, Matthew Musto, Jake Torrey, Sam Roman, Henry Walter, Michael Pollack
"Feelings"	V	2014	Adam Levine, Shellback, Oscar Görres
"Figure It Out"	It Won't Be Soon Before Long (Deluxe)	2007	Adam Levine
"Fortune Teller"	Overexposed	2012	Adam Levine, James Valentine, Mickey Madden
"Get Back In My Life"	Hands All Over	2010	Adam Levine, Jesse Carmichael, James Valentine
"Give a Little More"	Hands All Over	2010	Adam Levine, Jesse Carmichael, James Valentine
"Girls Like You"	Red Pill Blues	2017	Adam Levine, Starrah, Gian Stone, Cirkut, Jason Evigan
"Girls Like You" (featuring Cardi B)	Red Pill Blues (Re-release)	2018	Adam Levine, Belcalis Almanzar, Starrah, Gian Stone, Cirkut, Jason Evigan
"Goodnight Goodnight"	It Won't Be Soon Before Long	2007	Adam Levine
"Hands All Over"	Hands All Over	2010	Adam Levine, Sam Farrar, Jesse Carmichael
"Harder to Breathe"	Songs About Jane	2002	Adam Levine, Jesse Carmichael
"Help Me Out" (with Julia Michaels)	Red Pill Blues	2017	Adam Levine, Julia Michaels, Thomas Wesley Pentz, Justin Tranter
"Heroine"	Non-album single	2026	Adam Levine, John Ryan, Jacob Kasher Hindlin, Phil Plested, Michael Pollack
"How"	Hands All Over	2010	Adam Levine, Jesse Carmichael, Sam Farrar, Shawn Tellez
"I Can't Lie"	Hands All Over	2010	Adam Levine, Sam Farrar
"If I Never See Your Face Again"	It Won't Be Soon Before Long	2007	Adam Levine, James Valentine
"If I Never See Your Face Again" (featuring Rihanna)	It Won't Be Soon Before Long (Re-release); Good Girl Gone Bad: Reloaded	2008	Adam Levine, James Valentine
"Infatuation"	It Won't Be Soon Before Long (Deluxe)	2007	Adam Levine
"In Your Pocket"	V	2014	Adam Levine, Shellback, T. Jimson, M. Flygare
"Is Anybody Out There" (featuring PJ Morton)	Non-album single	2011	Maroon 5
"It Was Always You"	V	2014	Adam Levine, Sam Martin, Jason Evigan, Marcus Lomax, Jordan Johnson, Stefan Johnson
"Just a Feeling"	Hands All Over	2010	Adam Levine, Jesse Carmichael
"Kiwi"	It Won't Be Soon Before Long	2007	Adam Levine, James Valentine
"Ladykiller"	Overexposed	2012	Adam Levine, James Valentine, Mickey Madden
"Last Chance"	Hands All Over (Deluxe)	2010	Adam Levine, Sam Farrar
"Leaving California"	V	2014	Adam Levine, Benjamin Levin, Nate Ruess, Ammar Malik, Tor Eik Hermansen, Mikkel Storleer Eriksen
"Little of Your Time"	It Won't Be Soon Before Long	2007	Adam Levine
"Lips On You"	Red Pill Blues	2017	Adam Levine, Charlie Puth, Jacob Kasher Hindlin, Julia Michaels
"Losing My Mind"	It Won't Be Soon Before Long (Deluxe)	2007	Adam Levine, Jesse Carmichael
"Lost"	Jordi	2021	Adam Levine, Hindlin, Michael Pollack, Jonathan Bellion, Alexander Izquierdo, Stefan Johnson, Jordan K. Johnson
"Love Somebody"	Overexposed	2012	Adam Levine, Ryan Tedder, Noel Zancanella, Nathaniel Motte
"Lovesick"	Jordi	2021	Adam Levine, Hindlin, John Sudduth, Goldstein, Gabe Simon
"Lucky Strike"	Overexposed	2012	Adam Levine, Ryan Tedder, Noel Zancanella
"Makes Me Wonder"	It Won't Be Soon Before Long	2007	Adam Levine, Jesse Carmichael, Mickey Madden
"Maps"	V	2014	Adam Levine, Ryan Tedder, Benjamin Levin, Ammar Malik, Noel Zancanella
"Middle Ground"	Non-album single	2023	Adam Levine, Andrew Watt, Gregory Heinn, Jonathan Bellion, Marvin Hemmings, Pete Nappi, and Rodney Jerkins
"Memories"	Jordi	2019	Adam Levine, Jacob Kasher Hindlin, Michael Pollack, Jonathan Bellion, Jordan K. Johnson, Stefan Johnson, Vincent Ford
"Misery"	Hands All Over	2010	Adam Levine, Jesse Carmichael, Sam Farrar
"Miss You, Love You"	It Won't Be Soon Before Long (Deluxe)	2007	Adam Levine, Jesse Carmichael
"Moves like Jagger" (featuring Christina Aguilera)	Hands All Over (Re-release)	2011	Adam Levine, Benny Blanco, Ammar Malik, Shellback
"Must Get Out"	Songs About Jane	2002	Adam Levine, Jesse Carmichael
"My Heart Is Open" (featuring Gwen Stefani)	V	2014	Adam Levine, Benjamin Levin, Sia Furler, Rodney Jerkins, Andre Lindal
"Never Gonna Leave This Bed"	Hands All Over	2010	Adam Levine
"New Love"	V	2014	Adam Levine, Ryan Redder, Noel Zancanella
"No Curtain Call"	Hands All Over (Deluxe)	2010	Adam Levine, Jesse Carmichael, Harmony David Samuels
"Nobody's Love"	Jordi	2020	Adam Levine, Ryan Ogren, Michael Pollack, Nija Charles, Rosina Russell, B Ham, Kareen Lomax, Jordan K. Johnson, Stefan Johnson, Jacob Kasher Hindlin
"Not Coming Home"	Songs About Jane	2002	Jesse Carmichael, Ryan Dusick, Adam Levine
"Not Falling Apart"	It Won't Be Soon Before Long	2007	Adam Levine
"Nothing Lasts Forever"	It Won't Be Soon Before Long	2007	Adam Levine
"One Light" (featuring Bantu)	Jordi	2021	Adam Levine, Tinashe Sibanda, Philip Kembo, Jacob Kasher Hindin, Henry Walter, Ant Clemons, Kirsten Urbas, Cameron Breithaupt, Miles Breithaupt
"One Light (Remix)" (with Bantu featuring Yung Bleu and Latto)	Non-album single	2022	Adam Levine, Tinashe Sibanda, Philip Kembo, Jacob Kasher Hindin, Henry Walter, Oluwaseyi Akerele, Jeremy Biddle, Kirsten Urbas, Ant Clemons, Alyssa Stephens, Cameron Breithaupt, Miles Breithaupt
"One More Night"	Overexposed	2012	Adam Levine, Shellback, Max Martin, Savan Kotecha
"Out of Goodbyes" (with Lady Antebellum)	Hands All Over	2010	Adam Levine, Jesse Carmichael, James Valentine
"Payphone" (featuring Wiz Khalifa)	Overexposed	2012	Adam Levine, Benjamin Levin, Ammar Malik, Robopop, Shellback, Wiz Khalifa
"Plastic Rose"	Red Pill Blues (Deluxe)	2017	Adam Levine, James Alan Ghaleb, Oscar Gorres, Jacob Kasher Hindlin
"Ragdoll"	Songs About Jane (Special Repackage)	2004	Adam Levine, Jesse Carmichael
"Remedy" (featuring Stevie Nicks)	Jordi	2021	Adam Levine, Brittany Hazzard, Matthew Samuels, Jaheen Sweet, Miloš Angelov, John DeBold
"Runaway"	Hands All Over	2010	Adam Levine, Jesse Carmichael
"Sad"	Overexposed	2012	Adam Levine, James Valentine, Noah Passovoy
"Seasons"	Jordi	2021	Adam Levine, Tyree Hawkins, Tyshane Thompson, Keegan Bach, Blake Slatkin, Giorgio Ligeon, Nathan Butts
"Secret"	Songs About Jane	2002	Jesse Carmichael, Adam Levine
"She Will Be Loved"	Songs About Jane	2002	Adam Levine, James Valentine
"Shiver"	Songs About Jane	2002	Jesse Carmichael, Adam Levine
"Shoot Love"	V (Deluxe)	2014	Adam Levine, Benjamin Levin, Ammar Malik, Shellback, Paul Epworth
"Story"	It Won't Be Soon Before Long (Deluxe)	2007	Adam Levine, Jesse Carmichael
"Stutter"	Hands All Over	2010	Adam Levine, Sam Farrar, Matt Flynn
"Sugar"	V	2014	Adam Levine, Joshua Coleman, Lukasz Gottwald, Jacob Kasher Hindlin, Mike Posner, Henry Walter
"Sunday Morning"	Songs About Jane	2002	Maroon 5
"Sweetest Goodbye"	Songs About Jane	2002	Adam Levine
"Take What You Want"	Songs About Jane (10th Anniversary Edition)	2012	Adam Levine, Jesse Carmichael
"Tangled"	Songs About Jane	2002	Adam Levine
"The Air That I Breathe"	Hands All Over (Deluxe)	2010	Adam Levine, James Valentine, Tommy King
"The Man Who Never Lied"	Overexposed	2012	Adam Levine, Brian West, Marius Moga
"The Sun"	Songs About Jane	2002	Adam Levine
"The Way I Was"	It Won't Be Soon Before Long (Deluxe)	2007	Adam Levine, James Valentine, Ryan Dusick
"This Love"	Songs About Jane	2002	Adam Levine, Ryan Dusick, Mickey Madden, James Valentine, Jesse Carmichael
"This Summer's Gonna Hurt like a Motherfucker"	V (Reissue)	2015	Adam Levine, Shellback
"Through with You"	Songs About Jane	2002	Jesse Carmichael, Adam Levine
"Tickets"	Overexposed	2012	Adam Levine, James Valentine, Mickey Madden
"Unkiss Me"	V	2014	Adam Levine, Johan Carlsson, Ross Golan
"Until You're Over Me"	It Won't Be Soon Before Long (Deluxe)	2007	Adam Levine
"Wake Up Call"	It Won't Be Soon Before Long	2007	Adam Levine, James Valentine
"Wait"	Red Pill Blues	2017	Adam Levine, John Ryan, Jacob Kasher Hindlin, Ammar Malik
"Wasted Years"	Overexposed (Deluxe)	2012	Maroon 5, Richard Penniman
"What Lovers Do" (featuring SZA)	Red Pill Blues	2017	Adam Levine
"Whiskey" (featuring ASAP Rocky)	Red Pill Blues	2017	Adam Levine, Rakim Mayers, John Ryan, Jacob Kasher Hindlin, Tinashe Sibanda
"Who I Am" (featuring LunchMoney Lewis)	Red Pill Blues	2017	Adam Levine
"Wipe Your Eyes"	Overexposed (Deluxe)	2012	Adam Levine, J.R. Rotem, Ross Golan, Sanjeet Singh Kang, Damon Albarn, Mariam Doumbia, Marc Moreau
"Woman"	Spider-Man 2 (soundtrack)	2004	Maroon 5
"Won't Go Home Without You"	It Won't Be Soon Before Long	2007	Adam Levine

== Covers ==
Title	Album	Year	Original artist	Writer(s)
"If I Fell"	1.22.03.Acoustic	2004	The Beatles	Lennon–McCartney
"Highway to Hell" (vocals by Ryan Dusick)	1.22.03.Acoustic	2004	AC/DC	Bon Scott, Angus Young, Malcolm Young
"Closer"	"She Will Be Loved" (Australian CD single B-side)	2004	Nine Inch Nails	Trent Reznor
"Pure Imagination"	Mary Had a Little Amp, Change Is Now: Renewing America's Promise	2004, 2009	Gene Wilder	Leslie Bricusse, Anthony Newley
"Everyday People" (with Sly and the Family Stone)	Different Strokes by Different Folks	2005	Sly and the Family Stone	Sly Stone
"Hello"	Live: Friday the 13th	2005	Oasis	Noel Gallagher, Gary Glitter, Mike Leander
"Ain't No Sunshine"	Live: Friday the 13th	2005	Bill Withers	Bill Withers
"Happy Xmas (War Is Over)" (Note: "Happy Xmas (War Is Over)", was originally released in December 2005, as part of Amnesty International's Make Some Noise campaign. With a later version was released two years later in 2007.)	Non-album single	2005, 2007	John & Yoko, Plastic Ono Band	John Lennon, Yoko Ono
"Lovely Day" (featuring Bill Withers and Kori Withers)	Hoot (soundtrack)	2006	Bill Withers	Bill Withers, Skip Scarborough
"The Way You Look Tonight"	His Way, Our Way, Valentine's Day (soundtrack)	2009, 2010	Fred Astaire	Jerome Kern, Dorothy Fields
"Crazy Little Thing Called Love"	Hands All Over (Deluxe)	2010	Queen	Freddie Mercury
"If I Ain't Got You"	Hands All Over (Deluxe)	2011	Alicia Keys	Alicia Keys
"I Shall Be Released"	Chimes of Freedom	2012	The Band	Bob Dylan
"Come Away to the Water" (featuring Rozzi Crane)	The Hunger Games: Songs from District 12 and Beyond (soundtrack)	2012	Glen Hansard	Glen Hansard
"Kiss"	Overexposed (Deluxe)	2012	Prince and the Revolution	Prince
"Let's Stay Together"	Overexposed (Korean/Australian Deluxe)	2012	Al Green	Al Green, Willie Mitchell, Al Jackson, Jr.
"Happy"	BBC Radio 1's Live Lounge 2014	2014	Pharrell Williams	Pharrell Williams
"Sex and Candy"	V (Deluxe)	2014	Marcy Playground	John Wozniak
"Visions"	Red Pill Blues (Deluxe / Japanese Edition)	2017	Dirty Heads	Ryan Ogren, Adam Levine, Nick Bailey, Jared Watson, Dustin Bushnell
"Three Little Birds"	Non-album single	2018	Bob Marley and the Wailers	Robert Nesta Marley

== Unreleased songs ==
Title	Information	Source
"That's Not Enough"	Intended for Songs About Jane.	
"Locked Up"	Intended for Songs About Jane. The song's guitar riff was re-used in "Ladykiller", from the album Overexposed (2012).	
"Earth to Move"	Leaked by media hack group Music Mafia on June 13, 2017. The song was bootlegged from Overexposed recording sessions.	

== Featured songs ==
Title	Album/Single	Year	Artist	Writer(s)	Featured member
"Heard 'Em Say"	Late Registration	2005	Kanye West	Kanye West, Adam Levine, Michael Masser, Gerry Goffin	Adam Levine
"Live Again"	U.S.A. (United State of Atlanta)	2005	Ying Yang Twins		Adam Levine
"Wild Horses"	Unplugged	2005	Alicia Keys	Jagger/Richards	Adam Levine
"Signed, Sealed, Delivered (I'm Yours)"	Live 8	2005	Stevie Wonder		Adam Levine
"Rise Up with Fists!!"	Rabbit Fur Coat	2006	Jenny Lewis with The Watson Twins		James Valentine
"Stop This Train"	Continuum	2006	John Mayer	John Mayer	James Valentine
"In Repair"	Continuum	2006	John Mayer	John Mayer	James Valentine
"Say It Again"	N.B., Pocketful of Sunshine	2007, 2008	Natasha Bedingfield	Natasha Bedingfield, Adam Levine, Mike Elizondo	Adam Levine
"Pause the Tragic Ending"	Elephants...Teeth Sinking into Heart	2008	Rachael Yamagata	Rachael Yamagata	James Valentine
"Promised Land"	Yes We Can: Voices of a Grassroots Movement, G.O.O.D. Morning, G.O.O.D. Night	2008, 2009	Kanye West and Malik Yusef		Adam Levine
"Bang Bang"	Troubadour	2009	K'naan		Adam Levine
"Gotten"	Slash	2010	Slash		Adam Levine
"Home"	Ry Cuming	2010	Ry Cuming		Jesse Carmichael
"Unspoken (Remix)"	Hurley: Japanese Edition	2010	Weezer	Rivers Cuomo	Sam Farrar
"Bethany"	The Space in Between	2010	Janek Gwizdala		James Valentine
"Prayer"	One Day at a Time	2011	Doug Crawford		Adam Levine
"Stereo Hearts"	The Papercut Chronicles II	2011	Gym Class Heroes	Travie McCoy, Adam Levine, Benny Blanco, Benjamin Levin, Brandon Lowry, Ammar Malik, Dan Omelio	Adam Levine
"Stand Up"	Come Through for You	2011	Javier Colon	Javier Colon, Pharrell Williams, Martin Terefe	Adam Levine
"Traz O Sol Pro Meu Lado Da Rua"	Nacional	2011	Transmissor	Thiago Correa, Vander Lee	James Valentine
"Heavy"	Following On My Mind (EP), New Orleans	2012, 2013	PJ Morton		Adam Levine, James Valentine
"My Life"	Non-album single	2012	50 Cent and Eminem	Curtis Jackson, Marshall Mathers, Adam Levine, Larry Griffin, Jr., Herb Rooney	Adam Levine
"YOLO"	The Wack Album	2013	The Lonely Island and Kendrick Lamar	Andy Samberg, Akiva Schaffer, Jorma Taccone, Adam Levine, Kendrick Duckworth, Khari Cain, Rhiannon Bryan, Rhydian Davies	Adam Levine
"Sunday Morning"	Don't Look Down	2014	Caleb Chapman's Crescent Super Band and Madi Christensen	Jesse Carmichael, Adam Levine	James Valentine
"Lost Stars"	Begin Again (soundtrack), V (Deluxe)	2014	Adam Levine	Gregg Alexander, Danielle Brisebois, Nick Lashley, Nick Southwood	Adam Levine
"No One Else Like You"	Begin Again (soundtrack)	2014	Adam Levine	Gregg Alexander, Danielle Brisebois	Adam Levine
"A Higher Place"	Begin Again (soundtrack)	2014	Adam Levine	Gregg Alexander, Rick Nowels	Adam Levine
"Brooce Swayne"	Code Red	2014	Screaming Headless Torsos		James Valentine
"Painkiller"	Space (EP)	2015	Rozzi Crane		Adam Levine
"Locked Away"	What Dreams Are Made Of	2015	R. City	Theron Thomas, Timothy Thomas, Lukasz Gottwald, Henry Walter, Toni Tennille	Adam Levine
"I'm So Humble"	Popstar: Never Stop Never Stopping	2016	The Lonely Island	Andy Samberg, Akiva Schaffer, Jorma Taccone, Can Canatan, Al Hoffman, John Klenner	Adam Levine
"One Hell of a Song"	At Night, Alone	2016	Mike Posner	Mike Posner	James Valentine
"Go Now"	Sing Street	2016	Adam Levine	John Carney, Glen Hansard	Adam Levine
"Mic Jack"	Boomiverse	2017	Big Boi, Scar and Sleepy Brown	Antwan Patton, Dacoury Natche, Khalil Abdul-Rahman, Zion Brown, Zoe Brown, Malik Brown, Makari Brown, Patrick Brown, Taylor Parks, Terrence Smith	Adam Levine
"Bruises"	Kaleidoscopes (EP)	2017	Transviolet	Sarah McTaggart, Sam Farrar, Benjamin J. Greenspan	Sam Farrar
"Bus Stop"	The Rock & Roll Hall of Fame: In Concert 2010 & 2011	2018	Allan Clarke and Graham Nash with Adam Levine, Jesse Carmichael and Paul Shaffer	Graham Gouldman	Adam Levine, Jesse Carmichael
"Carrie Anne"	The Rock & Roll Hall of Fame: In Concert 2010 & 2011	2018	Allan Clarke and Graham Nash with Adam Levine, Jesse Carmichael and Paul Shaffer	Allan Clarke, Graham Nash, Tony Hicks	Adam Levine, Jesse Carmichael
"Famous" (Remix)	Non-album single	2018	French Montana		Adam Levine
"The River"	Wax	2018	KT Tunstall	KT Tunstall, Martin Terefe	James Valentine
"Sun Comes Up"	Wild Inside	2018	Rihwa	Rihwa, KT Tunstall, James Valentine	James Valentine
"Drip"	A Real Good Kid	2019	Mike Posner	Mike Posner, James Valentine	James Valentine
"Staring At the Fire"	A Real Good Kid	2019	Mike Posner	Mike Posner	James Valentine
"Daniela (Remix)"	Non-album single	2019	LEZ		Mickey Madden
"Afeni"	Eve	2019	Rapsody		PJ Morton
"Colourblind"	I Made It Out	2019	John P. Kee		PJ Morton
"Baby Girl"	Pesci... Still Singing	2019	Joe Pesci		Adam Levine
"My Cherie Amour"	Pesci... Still Singing	2019	Joe Pesci	Stevie Wonder, Henry Cosby, Sylvia Moy	Adam Levine
"Trust Nobody"	Funeral	2020	Lil Wayne	Dwayne Carter, Ryan Ogren, Brandon Hamlin, Ben Diehl, Jake Torrey, Michael Matosic, Jacob Hindlin	Adam Levine
"Wishlist"	December Baby	2020	JoJo	Joanna Levesque, PJ Morton, Billy Steinberg, Brian Higgins, Josh Alexander, Nathaniel Austin Brown	PJ Morton
"And So It Goes"	Walk with Me	2020	Mike Burton	Billy Joel, Mick Jones	PJ Morton
"Same Guy"	Thats What They All Say	2020	Jack Harlow	Jack Harrlow, Adam Levine, Braden Watt, Taji Morgan, Nathan Ward II, Carlos Homs	Adam Levine
"Lifestyle"	Nu King	2021	Jason Derulo	Jason Derulo, Adam Levine, Jacob Kasher, Amy Allen, Pablo Bowman, Casey Smith, Natalie Salomon, Kevin White, Michael Woods	Adam Levine
"Momma Always Told Me"	Non-album single	2021	Mike Posner, Stanaj and Yung Bae	Mike Posner, James Valentine, Albert Stanaj	James Valentine
"Boy Hood"	We Are	2021	Jon Batiste and Trombone Shorty	Troy Andrews, Jon Batiste, Sunny Levine, PJ Morton, Jahaan Sweet	PJ Morton
"Good Mood" (from Paw Patrol: The Movie)	Non-album single	2021	Adam Levine	Adam Levine, Shellback, Savan Kotecha, Oscar Görres	Adam Levine
"Amor Fati"	Crazy Rainbow (EP)	2021	Mike Posner and Jacob Scesney	Mike Posner, James Valentine, Jacob Scesney	James Valentine
"My Peace"	Watch the Sun	2022	PJ Morton, JoJo and Mr. TalkBox	PJ Morton, Joanna Levesque, Byron Manard Chambers, Antwan Patton, André Benjamin, Patrick Brown	PJ Morton
"Wings of Stone" (from The Bubble)	Non-album single	2022	Adam Levine	Judd Apatow, Josh Klinghoffer, Andrew Watt, Louis Bell, Dan Bern	Adam Levine
"Past Life"	Berry (Deluxe)	2022	Rozzi Crane and PJ Morton	Rozzi Crane, Eric Leva	PJ Morton
"ill"	Non-album single	2022	Alexander 23 and Kenny Beats	Alexander Glantz, Kenneth Charles Blume III	James Valentine
"Ojala"	Non-album single	2022	Maluma, the Rudeboyz and Adam Levine	Maluma, the Rudeboyz, Rios, Ily Wonder, Sencillo305, Jacob Kasher Hindin, Jake Torrey	Adam Levine

== Kara's Flowers ==
Title	Album/Single	Year	Writer(s)
"Buddy "Two-Shoes" Wilson"	The Fourth World	1997	Adam Levine, Jesse Carmichael
"Captain Splendid"	The Fourth World	1997	Adam Levine, Jesse Carmichael
"Future Kid"	The Fourth World	1997	Adam Levine, Jesse Carmichael, Mickey Madden, Ryan Dusick
"Loving the Small Time"	The Fourth World	1997	Adam Levine, Jesse Carmichael, Mickey Madden, Ryan Dusick
"My Ocean Blue"	The Fourth World	1997	Adam Levine, Jesse Carmichael, Mickey Madden, Ryan Dusick
"Myself"	The Fourth World	1997	Adam Levine, Jesse Carmichael, Mickey Madden, Ryan Dusick
"Oliver"	The Fourth World	1997	Adam Levine, Jesse Carmichael
"Pantry Queen"	The Fourth World	1997	Adam Levine, Jesse Carmichael
"Sleepy Windbreaker"	The Fourth World	1997	Adam Levine, Jesse Carmichael
"Soap Disco"	The Fourth World	1997	Adam Levine, Jesse Carmichael, Mickey Madden, Ryan Dusick
"The Never Saga"	The Fourth World	1997	Adam Levine, Jesse Carmichael
"To Her, with Love"	The Fourth World	1997	Adam Levine, Jesse Carmichael, Mickey Madden, Ryan Dusick

== Covers ==
Title	Album	Year	Original artist	Writer(s)	Ref.
"We Are the Champions"	103.9 WYEG Presents Edgefest 97	1997	Queen	Freddie Mercury	

== Original songs ==
As Kara's Flowers

Stagg Street Recordings

1. "If You Only Knew" – 3:26
2. "The Fog" – 4:42
3. "Simple Kind of Lovely" – 3:24
4. "The Great Getaway" – 4:13
5. "Good at Being Gone" – 3:05
6. "Not Falling Apart" (Note: "Not Falling Apart" is not to be confused with the It Won't Be Soon Before Long track.) – 2:15
7. "The Kid with the Velvet Eyes" – 5:13
8. "As Things Collide" – 3:50
9. "Everyday Goodbyes" – 4:01
10. "A Day in the Life (Out-take)" – 1:14

We Like Digging?

1. "Peeler" — 4:41
2. "Give Me Love" — 4:14
3. "Mental Mind Fuck" — 4:35
4. "Stable" — 4:17
5. "Ray Pim" — 2:48
6. "Leave a Message" — 6:14
7. "Miner" — 5:01
8. "Dame Cabeza" — 4:26
9. "Clomb" — 2:08
10. "Genius" — 5:29
11. "Untitled" — 12:58

Four-Track Demonstrations

1. "Someone More Comfortable"
2. "Vanessa"
3. "Spoke with Kate (and She Said)"
4. "If You Only Knew" (Acoustic Version)
5. "The Kid with the Velvet Eyes" (Acoustic Version)
6. "A Piano and Guitar Jam"
7. "Shayanni's Surprise"
8. "Feeling Slow"
9. "The Sentimental Programmer"

Room #222 Demos

1. "The Current Fantasy"
2. "Angela"
3. "My Favorite Belle"
4. "Neil's True Love"

The Fourth World B-Sides

1. "Angel in Blue Jeans" (Note: "Angel in Blue Jeans" was later retitled with the name "My Most Terrible Secret" by the cast of Community, in the episode "Intro to Felt Surrogacy" and written by Adam Levine, Gene Hong and composer Ludwig Göransson.)
2. "Come Talk with Me"
3. "Grave Condition"
4. "The Powers That Be"
5. "Buddy "Two Shoes" Wilson"
6. "Yesterday, When I Was Handsome" (Note: "Yesterday, When I Was Handsome" later appeared in the 1998 compilation album Hear You Me! A Tribute to Mykel and Carli.)
7. "Good Evening, Dr. Nothing"

Other songs (1999)

1. "July"
2. "However, Whatever"
3. "Just Tell Me One Thing"
4. "Give My Life"
5. "Keep Your Head"
6. "These Days"
7. "Ragdoll"
8. "Creation"

RCA Demos (2000)

1. Locked Up
2. Chilly Winter
3. Funky

== See also ==
- Maroon 5 discography
