= List of Maroon 5 band members =

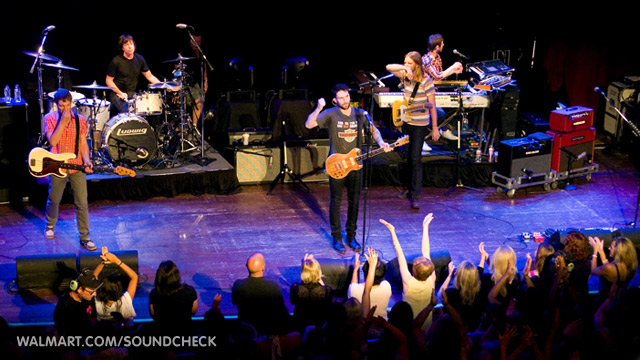
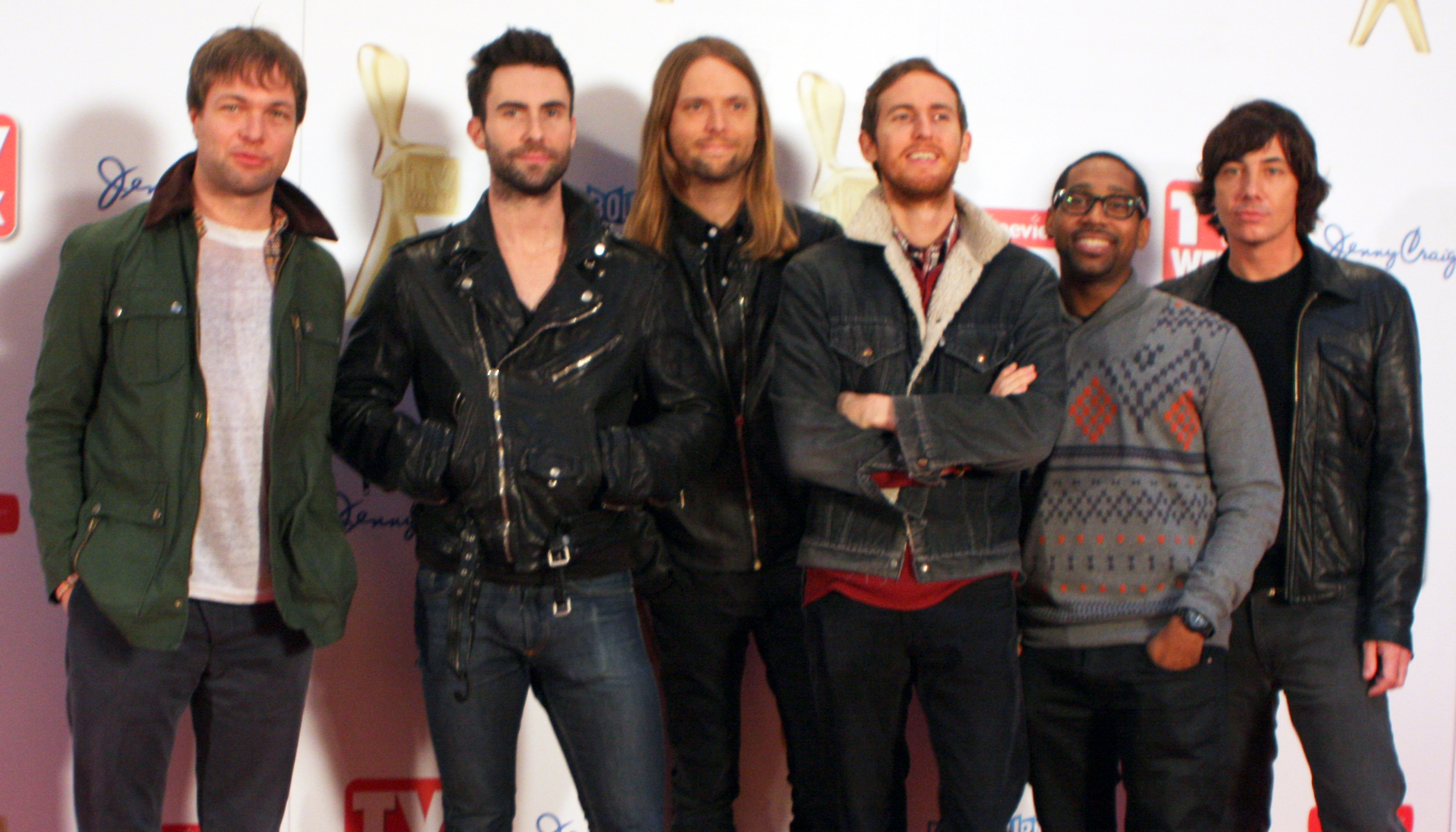
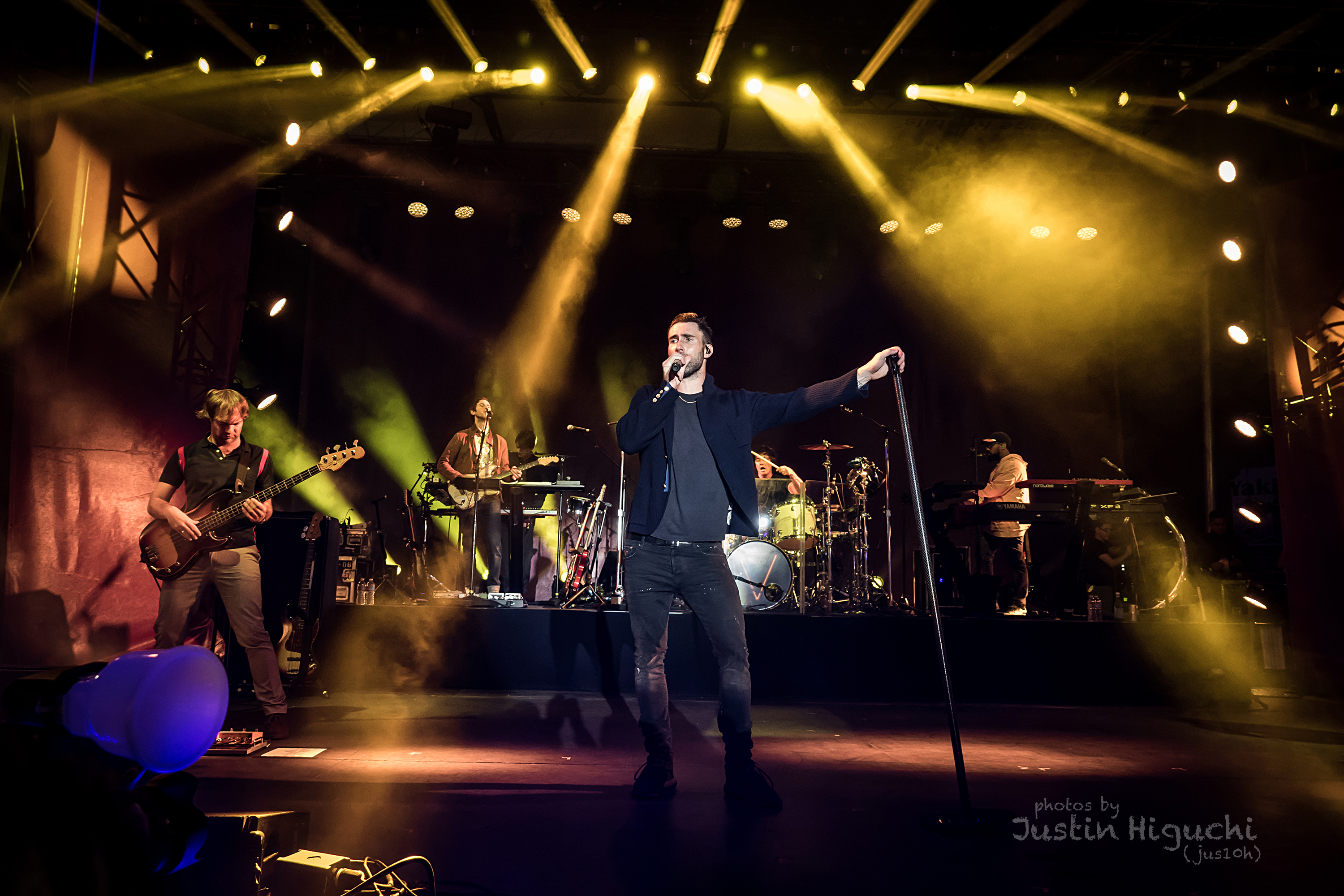
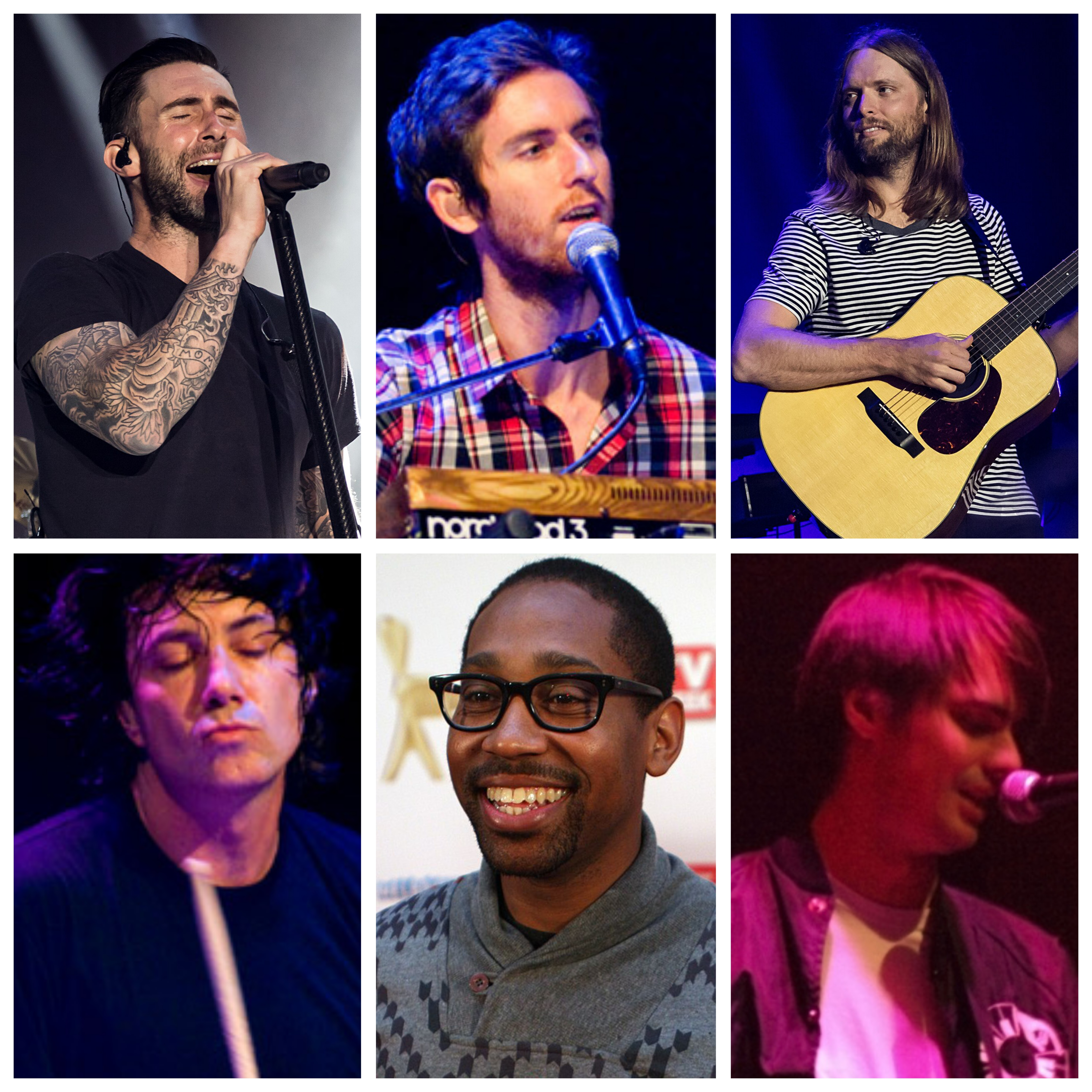
Maroon 5 in 2010, 2011, 2016 and current lineup of the band since 2020

Maroon 5 is an American pop rock band from Los Angeles, California. The group originally formed in 1994 as Kara's Flowers with a line-up of Adam Levine (vocals, guitar), Jesse Carmichael (guitar, keyboards), Mickey Madden (bass) and Ryan Dusick (drums). The band currently consists of Levine (a constant member) and Carmichael (who took a hiatus between 2012 and 2014), alongside lead guitarist James Valentine (since 2001), drummer Matt Flynn (since 2006), keyboardist PJ Morton (since 2012) and bassist Sam Farrar (since 2017).

== History ==
In 2001, guitarist James Valentine joined and the band changed the name to Maroon 5. In 2006, Ryan Dusick departed the band and was replaced by Matt Flynn, originally a touring member from 2004 to 2006.

In 2010, PJ Morton auditioned to be a touring keyboardist and backing vocalist of Maroon 5 and joined the band. Morton became an official member when he filled-in for Jesse Carmichael (who took a temporary break from performing with the group to focus on his studies) from 2012 to 2014 and as Carmichael returned to the band in 2014. In 2017, multi-instrumentalist Sam Farrar, who had been touring with the band since 2012, was announced as an official member. Bassist Mickey Madden left the band in 2020, at which point Farrar shifted to bass.

== Members ==
=== Current ===
Image	Name	Years active	Instruments	Release contributions
	Adam Levine	1994–present	lead vocals; rhythm and lead guitar; occasional percussion, drums and keyboards	All Maroon 5 releases and Kara's Flowers releases
	Jesse Carmichael	1994–2012; 2014–present	rhythm and lead guitar; keyboards; backing vocals	All Maroon 5 releases (except Overexposed) and Kara’s Flowers releases
	James Valentine	2001–present	lead and rhythm guitar; backing vocals; occasional keyboards	All Maroon 5 releases
	Matt Flynn	2006–present (touring 2004–2006)	drums; percussion	As a touring member: Live – Friday the 13th (2006); As an official member: All Maroon 5 releases since 2006
	PJ Morton	2012–present (touring 2010–2012)	keyboards; backing vocals	All Maroon 5 releases since 2012
	Sam Farrar	2016–present (touring 2001, 2012–2016) (studio 2001–2016)	bass; programming; percussion; backing vocals; production; keyboards; samples; SFX; guitar; turntables; theremin	As an outside collaborator: Songs About Jane (2002) – programming ("She Will Be Loved"); It Won't Be Soon Before Long (2007) – producer; Call and Response: The Remix Album (2008) – remixed a song, "Woman"; Hands All Over (2010) – writer ("Misery", "Stutter", "Don't Know Nothing", "I Can't Lie", "Hands All Over", "How" and "Last Chance"); Songs About Jane: 10th Anniversary Edition (2012) – producer; As a touring member: One off appearance (2001) - bass; Overexposed (2012) – producer and writer ("Ladykiller", "Fortune Teller" and "Tickets"), backing vocals, programming; V (2014) – backing vocals ("Unkiss Me" and "This Summer" – the latter song is from the 2015 re-release of V), programming; As an official member: All Maroon 5 releases since Red Pill Blues (2017)

=== Former ===
Image	Name	Years active	Instruments	Release contributions
	Mickey Madden	1994–2020	bass	All Maroon 5 and Kara's Flowers releases until Jordi
	Ryan Dusick	1994–2006	drums; percussion; backing vocals	As an official member: All Maroon 5 and Kara’s Flowers releases until 2006; As an outside collaborator: It Won't Be Soon Before Long (2007) – musical director, writer ("The Way I Was"); Overexposed (2012) – writer ("Wasted Years"); As an author and narrator: Harder to Breathe: A Memoir of Making Maroon 5, Losing It All, and Finding Recovery (2022)

=== Touring musicians ===
Image	Name	Years active	Instruments	Notes
	Ryland Steen	2003–2004	drums; percussion	Steen and Day filled in for Dusick before Flynn joined.
	Josh Day	2003–2004	drums; percussion	Steen and Day filled in for Dusick before Flynn joined.
	Tommy "Boom-Boom" King	2009	keyboards; backing vocals	King played with the band in 2009, and contributed to Hands All Over (2010) – writer ("The Air That I Breathe")
	Adrian Young	2009	drums; percussion	Young played with the band in 2009.

== Line-up history ==
Period	Members	Studio releases
1994–2001 (as Kara's Flowers)	Adam Levine – lead vocals, lead and rhythm guitar; Ryan Dusick – drums, percussion, backing vocals; Jesse Carmichael – lead and rhythm guitar, keyboards, backing vocals; Mickey Madden – bass	We Like Digging? (1994); The Fourth World (1997); Stagg Street Recordings (1999)
2001–2004 (as Maroon 5)	Adam Levine – lead vocals, rhythm and lead guitar; Ryan Dusick – drums, percussion, backing vocals; Jesse Carmichael – keyboards, backing vocals, occasional rhythm guitar; Mickey Madden – bass; James Valentine – lead and rhythm guitar	Songs About Jane (2002)
2004–2006	Adam Levine – lead vocals, lead and rhythm guitar; Ryan Dusick – backing vocals, drums, percussion; Jesse Carmichael – keyboards, backing vocals, rhythm guitar; Mickey Madden – bass; James Valentine – lead and rhythm guitar; Matt Flynn – drums, percussion (replaced Ryan Dusick as a touring drummer)	Live – Friday the 13th (2005)
2006–2010	Adam Levine – lead vocals, rhythm and lead guitar, percussion / drums, keyboards; Jesse Carmichael – keyboards, rhythm guitar, backing vocals; Mickey Madden – bass; James Valentine – lead and rhythm guitar, backing vocals; Matt Flynn – drums, percussion (touring member from 2004 to 2006)	It Won't Be Soon Before Long (2007); Hands All Over (2010)
2010–2012	Adam Levine – lead vocals, rhythm and lead guitar; Jesse Carmichael – keyboards, rhythm guitar, backing vocals; Mickey Madden – bass; James Valentine – lead and rhythm guitar, backing vocals; Matt Flynn – drums, percussion; PJ Morton – keyboards, backing vocals (touring member)	
2012–2014	Adam Levine – lead vocals, rhythm and lead guitar; Mickey Madden – bass; James Valentine – lead and rhythm guitar, keyboards, backing vocals; Matt Flynn – drums, percussion; PJ Morton – keyboards, backing vocals (a touring member from 2010 to 2012; filled-in for Jesse Carmichael during his hiatus); Sam Farrar – rhythm guitar, percussion, samples, synthesizers, MPC, keyboards, backing vocals (touring member)	Overexposed (2012)
2014–2016	Adam Levine – lead vocals, occasional guitars; Jesse Carmichael – rhythm guitar, keyboards, backing vocals; Mickey Madden – bass; James Valentine – lead and rhythm guitar, backing vocals; Matt Flynn – drums, percussion; PJ Morton – keyboards, backing vocals; Sam Farrar – samples, rhythm guitar, percussion, synthesizers, MPC, keyboards, backing vocals (touring member)	V (2014)
2016–2020	Adam Levine – lead vocals, occasional guitars; Jesse Carmichael – rhythm guitar, occasional keyboards, backing vocals; Mickey Madden – bass; James Valentine – lead and rhythm guitar, backing vocals; Matt Flynn – drums, percussion; PJ Morton – keyboards, backing vocals; Sam Farrar – bass, samples, percussion, synthesizers, MPC, keyboards, rhythm guitar, backing vocals (a touring member from 2012 to 2016)	Red Pill Blues (2017); Jordi (2020) 4 tracks only
2020–present	Adam Levine – lead vocals, rhythm and lead guitar; Jesse Carmichael – rhythm guitar, occasional keyboards, backing vocals; James Valentine – lead and rhythm guitar, backing vocals; Matt Flynn – drums, percussion; PJ Morton – keyboards, backing vocals; Sam Farrar – bass, keyboards, synthesizers, percussion, occasional rhythm guitar, backing vocals	Jordi (2021); Love Is Like (2025)
