= Must Get Out =

2005 single by Maroon 5

Single by Maroon 5

from the album Songs About Jane
- B-side: "This Love"
- Released: April 5, 2005
- Genre: Soft rock
- Length: 3:59 (album version); 3:53 (radio edit)
- Label: Octone; J
- Songwriters: Adam Levine; Jesse Carmichael
- Producer: Matt Wallace

Maroon 5 singles chronology
"Sunday Morning" (2004)	"Must Get Out" (2005)	"Makes Me Wonder" (2007)

"Must Get Out" is a song by American band Maroon 5, taken from their debut album, Songs About Jane (2002). Written by the band members Adam Levine and Jesse Carmichael, and produced by Matt Wallace, the song was released as the fifth and final single from the album on April 5, 2005. A downtempo song, "Must Get Out" has a "dreamy" lyrical story about a tough period of a relationship. The song received mostly positive reviews from music critics, who praised Levine's vocals and the song's hook, considering it a highlight on the album.

"Must Get Out" charted in the Top 10 in Netherlands, while reaching the Top 40 in three other territories, including the U.K. where it became the band's fifth Top 40 hit. The song featured on Maroon 5's live album titled Live – Friday the 13th (2005). This is the only single on the album to have an official live music video, and the band's last to feature founding drummer Ryan Dusick.

== Composition and lyrics ==
"Must Get Out" is a soft rock ballad, written by band members Adam Levine and Jesse Carmichael, with production and mixing by Matt Wallace. The song was written in the key of G major and set in a common time, with a tempo of 96 beats per minute. Levine's vocals on the song range from the low-note of G3 to the high note of B4. The band's guitarist James Valentine explained that the downtempo song emulates Andy Summers and The Police.

Lyrically, "Must Get Out" expresses a tough period of a relationship, with a dreamy lyrical story, where the band "offers up clever imagery with 'I've been the needle and thread/Weaving figures eights and circles ‘round your head' and frank confessions to today's problems, 'The city's made us crazy and we must get out'."

== Release and reception ==
"Must Get Out" was selected as the album's fifth and final single from the album in Europe, being released on April 5, 2005. Its promotional single features the radio edit of the song, while the commercial single features the song and an acoustic version of the band's breakout hit "This Love". A release in the United Kingdom followed on April 11, 2005.

=== Critical ===
"Must Get Out" received positive reviews from most music critics. In his review for the album, MacKenzie Wilson from Allmusic picked the song as a highlight, writing that the song "slows things down" and noted that "Levine is a vocal dead ringer for Men at Work's Colin Hay. Don't wince – it works brilliantly." Wayne Hoffman of Billboard also chose the song as a highlight, calling it "gentler". Robert Christgau also highlighted the track, writing: "Broken heart often spurs killer hooks, fond memories occasionally engender likable songs," citing "Must Get Out" as an example. Jason Thompson of PopMatters noted that Jesse Carmichael manages to conjure The New Radicals on the song, claiming that it is one of the "plenty of things [on the album] that could be hits." Meanwhile, Christian Hoard of Rolling Stone called it a "pretty, down-tempo" song that "sound[s] poised to mount an assault on [John] Mayer's college fan base."

=== Commercial ===
While not as successful as the other singles from the album, "Must Get Out" experienced moderate success in some European countries. In the Netherlands, the song proved to be one of the band's most successful singles from the album, only behind "This Love" and "She Will Be Loved", reaching number 8 and becoming the band's third top-10 hit. In Ireland and the United Kingdom, the song became another top-40 hit for the band, reaching numbers 34 and 39, respectively – in the UK in particular, the song was the band's fifth consecutive top-40 single. Likewise, in New Zealand, the song was their fifth top-40 single, though their least successful single on the charts, along with "Misery" (2010).

== Live performances ==
Maroon 5 performed the track during their AOL Sessions, at the Top of the Pops and included the song on the 2005's CD/DVD Live – Friday the 13th. They performed the song on The Today Show on February 4, 2005. It was part of the encore on the "Songs About Jane Tour" and was last performed on the 2005 Honda Civic Tour.

== Track listing ==
European CD single
No.	Title	Length
1.	"Must Get Out" (album version)	3:59
2.	"This Love" (acoustic version)	4:00

== Personnel ==
Personnel are adapted from the Songs About Jane liner notes.

Maroon 5

- Adam Levine – vocals, guitars
- Ryan Dusick – drums
- Jesse Carmichael – keyboards
- James Valentine – guitars
- Mickey Madden – bass guitar

== Charts ==
=== Weekly charts ===
Chart (2005)	Peak position
Ireland (IRMA)	34
Netherlands (Dutch Top 40)	8
New Zealand (Recorded Music NZ)	38
Scotland Singles (Official Charts)	32
UK Singles (Official Charts)	39
Ukraine Airplay (TopHit)	189

=== Year-end charts ===
Chart (2005)	Position
Netherlands (Dutch Top 40)	63

== Release history ==
Region	Date	Format(s)	Label(s)	Ref.
Europe	April 5, 2005	CD	Octone; J	
United Kingdom	April 11, 2005	CD	Octone; J	
