= Live – Friday the 13th =

Live album by Maroon 5
- Released: September 20, 2005
- Recorded: May 13, 2005
- Venue: Santa Barbara Bowl (Santa Barbara, California)
- Length: 77:58 (DVD and CD)
- Label: A&M Octone
- Producer: Melinda Kelly

Maroon 5 chronology
1.22.03.Acoustic (2004)	Live – Friday the 13th (2005)	It Won't Be Soon Before Long (2007)

Professional ratings
Review scores
Source	Rating
AllMusic	3/5 stars
Rolling Stone	3/5 stars

Live – Friday the 13th is a live DVD and CD release by Maroon 5. It was recorded on May 13, 2005 in Santa Barbara, California at the Santa Barbara Bowl. The DVD features exclusive interviews with the band and insight into how certain key songs came about. The live concert is a performance of all their songs and the CD contains the same tracks. This album has been released with the Copy Control protection system in some regions.

"Wasted Years" first appeared on this album. The song, contrary to popular belief, was not written for Songs About Jane. A demo of the song similar to the demos featured on the 10th Anniversary edition of this album was recorded by Adam Levine and Sam Farrar, but has not been released. A reworked version of the song was later featured on the deluxe edition of Overexposed.

== Track listing ==
Live – Friday the 13th track listing
No.	Title	Writer(s)	Length
1.	"Shiver"	Adam Levine; Jesse Carmichael	4:49
2.	"Through with You"	Levine; Carmichael	3:19
3.	"Tangled"	Levine	3:37
4.	"Harder to Breathe"	Levine; Carmichael	2:58
5.	"The Sun"	Levine	7:52
6.	"Wasted Years"	Levine	5:23
7.	"Secret/Ain't No Sunshine"	Levine; Carmichael; Bill Withers	7:11
8.	"Not Coming Home"	Levine; Carmichael; Ryan Dusick	4:28
9.	"This Love"	Levine; Carmichael	5:14
10.	"Must Get Out"	Levine; Carmichael	4:08
11.	"Sunday Morning"	Levine; Carmichael	6:37
12.	"Sweetest Goodbye"	Levine	9:39
13.	"Hello" (Oasis cover)	Noel Gallagher; Gary Glitter; Mike Leander	3:52
14.	"She Will Be Loved"	Levine; James Valentine	8:51
Total length:			77:58

== Personnel ==
Maroon 5

- Adam Levine – lead vocals, lead and rhythm guitar
- Jesse Carmichael – keyboards, backing vocals; lead guitar on "Hello", rhythm guitar on "She Will Be Loved"
- Mickey Madden – bass guitar
- James Valentine – lead and rhythm guitar
- Ryan Dusick – backing vocals (off-stage)
- Matt Flynn – drums, percussion

Other

- Melinda Kelly - executive production
- Mike Shipley - mixing, studio personnel

== Charts ==
Chart performance for Live – Friday the 13th
Chart (2005)	Peak position
Australian Albums (ARIA)	37
US Billboard 200	61
UK Music Videos (Official Charts)	12
