= 1.22.03.Acoustic =

EP by Maroon 5
- Released: June 29, 2004
- Recorded: January 22, 2003
- Venue: Hit Factory (New York City)
- Genres: Pop rock; acoustic rock
- Length: 29:28
- Label: Octone

Maroon 5 chronology
Songs About Jane (2002)	1.22.03.Acoustic (2004)	Live – Friday the 13th (2005)

Professional ratings
Review scores
Source	Rating
AllMusic	3/5 stars

1.22.03.Acoustic is a live EP by Californian band Maroon 5. Named for the date it was recorded live at the Hit Factory, New York, it contains acoustic versions of many of the songs on their international hit album, Songs About Jane, as well as two cover songs (The Beatles' "If I Fell" and AC/DC's "Highway to Hell"). The album was released on June 29, 2004.

The album reached No. 42 in the United States, and was certified Gold by both the RIAA and the BPI.

== Critical reception ==
Giving the EP a C grade, Entertainment Weekly said that "Maroon 5 cement their reputation as kings of the new faceless pop," adding, "Adam Levine...sounds more grating than usual without the much-needed studio gloss."

== Track listing ==
1.22.03.Acoustic track listing
No.	Title	Writer(s)	Length
1.	"This Love"	Adam Levine; Jesse Carmichael	4:15
2.	"Sunday Morning"	Levine; Carmichael	4:14
3.	"She Will Be Loved"	Levine; James Valentine	4:34
4.	"Harder to Breathe"	Levine; Carmichael	3:09
5.	"The Sun"	Levine	5:18
6.	"If I Fell"	Lennon–McCartney	3:23
7.	"Highway to Hell"	Bon Scott; Angus Young; Malcolm Young	4:30
Total length:			29:28

Notes

- a: Track 6 originally recorded by The Beatles on the album A Hard Day's Night.
- b: "Highway to Hell" was originally recorded by AC/DC on the album of the same name. This version features singer Adam Levine on drums and Ryan Dusick on lead vocals and rhythm guitar, live from Hamburg, Germany.

== Personnel ==
Personnel taken from 1.22.03.Acoustic liner notes.

- Adam Levine – lead vocals, guitar
- James Valentine – guitar
- Jesse Carmichael – piano, guitar, backing vocals
- Mickey Madden – bass
- Ryan Dusick – percussion, backing vocals

== Charts ==
Chart performance for 1.22.03.Acoustic
Chart (2004)	Peak position
Australian Albums (ARIA)	61
Austrian Albums (Ö3 Austria)	55
Irish Albums (IRMA)	64
Italian Albums (FIMI)	65
Swiss Albums (Schweizer Hitparade)	66
UK Albums (Official Charts)	58
US Billboard 200	42

== Certifications ==
Certifications for 1.22.03.Acoustic
Region	Certification	Certified units/sales
United Kingdom (BPI)	Gold	100,000^{‡}
United States (RIAA)	Gold	500,000^{^}
^{^} Shipments figures based on certification alone.^{‡} Sales+streaming figures based on certification alone.
