= Harder to Breathe =

2002 single by Maroon 5

Single by Maroon 5

from the album Songs About Jane
- B-side: "Ragdoll"; "Secret"
- Released: May 22, 2002
- Recorded: 2002
- Genre: Funk rock
- Length: 2:53
- Label: Octone
- Songwriters: Adam Levine; Jesse Carmichael
- Producer: Matt Wallace

Maroon 5 singles chronology
"Soap Disco" (1997)	"Harder to Breathe" (2002)	"This Love" (2004)

Music video
- "Harder to Breathe" on YouTube

"Harder to Breathe" is a song by American band Maroon 5, released on May 22, 2002, as the band's debut single and as the lead single from their first album, Songs About Jane (2002). Co-written by frontman Adam Levine and Jesse Carmichael, the song expresses tension, having been written quickly under trying circumstances, and tells the story about a former relationship Levine was involved in. The track was positively received by music critics.

The song peaked at number six on Airplay Monitor. In spite of Maroon 5's later mainstream success, it also appeared on the Alternative Songs chart at number 31 and the Billboard Hot 100 at number 18. Internationally, the single charted at number 13 in the United Kingdom and peaked within the top 40 on the Irish, Italian, Australian, and New Zealand charts, respectively, while also charting in Germany, the Netherlands, and Sweden.

"Harder to Breathe" was included on Maroon 5's 2004 EP 1.22.03.Acoustic in an acoustic version and the live album Live – Friday the 13th (2005).

== Background ==
In an interview with MTV News in August 2002, Maroon 5 vocalist Adam Levine, when asked behind the development of "Harder to Breathe", admitted that the song describes the band's frustration with their label, Octone Records, during the making of their debut album, Songs About Jane. The band thought they had enough material for a release, but when the label told them to keep writing, Levine wrote this song to express his frustration at the pressure. "That song comes sheerly from wanting to throw something. It was the 11th hour, and the label wanted more songs. It was the last crack. I was just pissed. I wanted to make a record and the label was applying a lot of pressure, but I'm glad they did."

"Harder to Breathe" tells the story of a relationship Levine had with a woman named Jane, who, according to Levine was the "muse" in the band's album. MacKenzie Wilson of AllMusic described the song as a "soulful disposition". Meghan Bard of The Daily Campus described the single featuring "a great up-tempo number with gritty guitar riffs and powerful vocals" from Levine. Bard noted that the theme in the song was about "recovering from heartbreak". Angus Batey of The Times compared "Harder to Breathe" sounding as "Zeppelin-esque".

== Critical reception ==
The song received positive reviews from critics. In the Rolling Stone review of the album, critic Christian Hoard called "Harder to Breathe" "a strong single". C. Spencer Beggs of The Observer wrote: "The two singles ['Harder to Breathe' and 'This Love'] are the most popular songs on the album, showing off Maroon 5's characteristic clean, crisp and upbeat sound." Sam Beresky of the Daily Lobo, who was less enthusiastic about the album, complimented Maroon 5 on "Harder to Breathe", in which he said, "The song is enjoyable. There are some aspects of mellow, soulful rockers like Train, John Mayer—maybe even a little Stevie Wonder or Jamiroquai. The track has a good rock meets R&B sound and is predictable enough to get radio play."

In October 2003, Levine told USA Today, regarding the success of the song, "I didn't love or hate the song, and I didn't care if it got on the album. We have a lot of pop songs on our record, and the idea was to start out with something different. Why come out of the gate with another pop song by another pop band?" The following year, the band released an EP titled 1.22.03.Acoustic (2004), which features "Harder to Breathe" in an acoustic version. In 2005, Maroon 5 released a live album, Live – Friday the 13th, which features the song performed live.

== Commercial performance ==
"Harder to Breathe" charted on Airplay Monitor in the number six position and later peaked at number 18 on Billboard's Hot 100. The song also appeared on Billboard's Hot Modern Rock Tracks chart in the number 31 position in 2002 when it was an independent single before it hit commercial radio stations in 2003–04, it is the band's only song played on alternative rock stations along with "This Love", while the rest of the band's other singles were only played on pop and adult contemporary radio outlets considering Maroon 5 as a pop rock band and not an alternative band. Internationally, "Harder to Breathe" appeared in the UK Singles Chart on January 31, 2004, at its peak of number 13 and spent seven weeks on the chart. The single also appeared in the top 40 on the Irish, Italian, Australian, and New Zealand charts, and peaked in the lower end of the Dutch, German, and Swedish charts.

== Music video ==
The music video for "Harder to Breathe" was directed by Marc Webb, who later worked with the band for their 2008 video "Goodnight Goodnight". The video was released on August 19, 2002 and received airplay on 120 Minutes.

The video is centered on Maroon 5 playing in a dimly-lit house/factory. Throughout the course of the video, items such as darts on a dart board, candles, pictures, and even members of the band with their instruments are shown fading in and out. Towards the end of the video, Adam Levine is seen walking through a narrow corridor dragging a guitar with pictures on both sides of the wall fading in and out. When he reaches the end of the corridor, he is face to face with a wall with a small light coming out of it and then flings his guitar backwards and then pounds on the wall. The camera then quickly moves to a scene of the band playing and the lights suddenly flickering on.

== Personnel ==
Credits adapted from Songs About Jane liner notes.

Maroon 5

- Adam Levine – lead vocals, guitars
- Ryan Dusick – drums, backing vocals
- Jesse Carmichael – keyboards
- James Valentine – guitars
- Mickey Madden – bass guitar

Additional musician

- Bruce Smith – programming

== Charts ==
=== Weekly charts ===
Weekly chart performance for "Harder to Breathe"
Chart (2002–2004)	Peak position
Australia (ARIA)	37
CIS Airplay (TopHit)	128
Germany (GfK)	79
Ireland (IRMA)	34
Italy (FIMI)	28
Netherlands (Dutch Top 40 Tipparade)	12
Netherlands (Single Top 100)	86
New Zealand (Recorded Music NZ)	33
Scottish Singles Sales (Official Charts)	11
Sweden (Sverigetopplistan)	54
UK Singles (Official Charts)	13
UK Rock & Metal (Official Charts)	6
US Billboard Hot 100	18
US Adult Pop Airplay (Billboard)	15
US Alternative Airplay (Billboard)	31
US Pop Airplay (Billboard)	5

Chart (2019)	Peak position
US Alternative Digital Song Sales (Billboard)	12

=== Year-end charts ===
Year-end chart performance for "Harder to Breathe"
Chart (2003)	Position
US Adult Top 40 (Billboard)	33
US Mainstream Top 40 (Billboard)	33

Chart (2004)	Position
UK Singles (OCC)	183

== Certifications ==
Certifications and sales for "Harder to Breathe"
Region	Certification	Certified units/sales
Australia (ARIA)	Platinum	70,000^{‡}
New Zealand (RMNZ)	Platinum	30,000^{‡}
United Kingdom (BPI)	Silver	200,000^{‡}
United States (RIAA)	Platinum	1,000,000
^{‡} Sales+streaming figures based on certification alone.

== Release history ==
Release dates and formats for "Harder to Breathe"
Region	Date	Format	Label	Ref.
United States	May 22, 2002	Radio	Octone	
Australia	September 29, 2003	CD	Universal	
