= Songs About Jane =

Studio album by Maroon 5
- Released: June 25, 2002
- Recorded: Late 2001 – January 21, 2002
- Studios: Rumbo (Los Angeles); Can-Am (Los Angeles)
- Genres: Pop rock; funk rock; alternative rock; blue-eyed soul
- Length: 46:06
- Labels: Octone; J
- Producers: Matt Wallace; Mark Endert

Maroon 5 chronology
Stagg Street Recordings (1999)	Songs About Jane (2002)	1.22.03.Acoustic (2004)

Singles from Songs About Jane
- 1. "Harder to Breathe" Released: May 22, 2002; 2. "This Love" Released: January 12, 2004; 3. "She Will Be Loved" Released: June 21, 2004; 4. "Sunday Morning" Released: November 8, 2004; 5. "Must Get Out" Released: April 5, 2005

Songs About Jane is the debut studio album by American pop rock band Maroon 5. The album was released on June 25, 2002, by Octone. It became a sleeper hit with the help of five singles that attained chart success, led by "Harder to Breathe", "This Love", and "She Will Be Loved". This is the band's only album to feature founding drummer Ryan Dusick (excluding Kara's Flowers releases).

The album was re-released on October 14, 2003 by Octone Records and J Records respectively, becoming a huge international commercial success, and received acclaim from fans and critics. It topped the album charts in Australia, France, New Zealand, the Republic of Ireland and the United Kingdom, and reached the top-ten in 17 other countries. At the end of 2004, the album reached the top-ten of the US Billboard 200 chart. It had sold nearly 2.7 million copies by the end of 2004, and over 5.1 million copies in the U.S. by August 2015. The album sold 10 million copies worldwide.

On June 5, 2012, the band released the album's 10th anniversary edition, to coincide with their fourth studio album Overexposed. The anniversary edition features demos of all the album tracks, plus other B-sides and demos. It also features an EPK and behind the scenes footage of the album.

== Background ==
Before the name Maroon 5, the band was called Kara's Flowers, which released an album called The Fourth World in mid-1997 on Reprise Records with little success, and had previously released the independent album We Like Digging?. Kara's Flowers left Reprise Records in 1999, and with the addition of guitarist James Valentine, the five-person band became known as Maroon 5.

The band played showcase gigs in New York City and Los Angeles. Singer and guitarist Adam Levine credited the interim with influencing the band's new style in an interview with VH1. "During the time between our record deals, I spent a lot of time in New York where I was exposed to an urban and hip-hop culture in a way that had never happened to me in L.A. It turned me on to an entirely new genre of music which has had a profound impact on my song writing."

The band signed with Octone Records, a New York independent label with distribution through BMG and an artist development deal with Clive Davis' J Records. The band recorded Songs About Jane at Rumbo Recorders in Los Angeles with producer Matt Wallace, who had also produced with Train, Faith No More, and O.A.R. Production was handled primarily by Wallace, with Mark Endert mixing with additional production for "This Love".

Eight of the songs on the album were either written or co-written by Levine and keyboardist Jesse Carmichael, while the former was living in New York. Many of the lyrics for the album are inspired by Levine's relationship with his ex-girlfriend, Jane Herman. Levine notes, "I saw this girl at a gas station, and I fell in love with her...I wrote a song about her and played it in the store where she worked. It was an awful song. But she found out about this relatively psychotic boy. She was my muse for years. . . . And then it kind of faded away." Levine also confirmed this, saying there was at least one line in every song about her.

== Composition ==
Musically, the album has been described as pop rock, funk rock, alternative rock, and blue-eyed soul.

== Release and reception ==
Professional ratings
Review scores
Source	Rating
AllMusic	3.5/5 stars
Christgau's Consumer Guide	(1-star Honorable Mention)
The Guardian	3/5 stars
Rolling Stone	3/5 stars
Sputnikmusic	4.5/5 stars

The album has been released with the Copy Control protection system in some regions. After the release of the album in mid-2002, the band toured with Michelle Branch and Nikka Costa. They also toured with Matchbox Twenty and Sugar Ray during some of their shows in 2003. In March 2004, the album had reached the top 20 of the Billboard 200, and had reached the top 10 by the end of the year. Songs About Jane also eventually topped the UK and Australian album charts. Songs About Jane was the seventh best-selling album of 2004 in the U.S., with about 2.7 million copies sold. In Australia, the album did not chart on the End of Year Charts until 2004, where it reached No. 6. After constant touring, three years after the release of Songs About Jane, it received a Grammy for Best New Artist. The album reached 5.1 million sales in the United States in August 2015.

The album received acclaim from music critics. Christian Hoard of Rolling Stone praised the album for its "vaguely funky white-soul stylings, tunefulness and vocals" and mentioned "Must Get Out" and "This Love" as the album's standout tracks. AllMusic's MacKenzie Wilson called the album an "impressive rebirth" from Kara's Flowers' "indie outfit", stating: "Songs About Jane is love-drunk on what makes Maroon 5 tick as a band ... they've got grit and a sexy strut, personally and musically." Caroline Sullivan of The Guardian commented that the album "isn't as useless as one would hope ... Songs About Jane is pitched at the Busted market, for which their guitar-mashing and surging harmonies eminently qualify them." In The Village Voice, Mikael Wood wrote that while Adam Levine's "sexual politics occasionally lapse into casual senior-year cruelty", he "more often than not complicates the situation encouragingly." PopMatters's Jason Thompson, however, panned the album, criticizing Levine's likeness to Jay Kay of Jamiroquai. Calling the album "limp at best", he further added: "There's simply nothing here to get excited about. And what about that soul that these guys are boasting about, anyway?".

== Songs ==
According to Billboard, as of 2022, Songs About Jane is one of the 15 best-performing 21st-century albums without any of its singles being number-one hits on the Billboard Hot 100.

The opening track and first single, "Harder to Breathe", released two months before the album released, slowly started to pick up airplay which helped spur sales of the album. "Harder to Breathe" also made the top 20 of the Billboard Hot 100 singles charts and the singles charts in the United Kingdom, Australia and New Zealand. In an interview with MTV News in August 2002, Maroon 5 vocalist Adam Levine, when asked behind the development of "Harder to Breathe", admitted that the song describes the band's frustration with their label, Octone Records, during the making of their debut album. The band thought they had enough material for a release, but when the label told them to keep writing, Levine wrote this song in frustration at the pressure.

The second track, "This Love", was also the second single from the album. It won the band their first Grammy Award, for Best Pop Performance by a Duo or Group with Vocals at the 2006 Grammy Awards. In March 2004 the song reached the top 10 of the Australian and United States singles charts. The single's accompanying music video proved to be popular as well, but had to be edited from its original version to avoid being banned from MTV. In an interview, Levine revealed that the song was written in the "most emotionally trying time" in his life. He also added, "I was in a relationship that was ending, but I was really excited on the other end because the band was about to go make the record and I was ecstatic to go in the studio. She was literally leaving town within days of me writing the lyrics to 'This Love', so I was in prime emotional condition to write a song with that kind of conflict." The demo of the song features a guitar solo.

"She Will Be Loved", the fourth track and third single from the album, also reached similar chart success as the band's previous hits, hitting No. 1 on the Mainstream Top 40 and Adult Top 40 charts, and topping the Australian and Belgian charts and peaking at No. 5 in the United States, the same chart position of previous single and breakthrough hit, "This Love". The song prompted many alternative radio outlets to remove Maroon 5 from their playlists, on the ground that the band's newer songs were too light for alt-rock audiences. These stations continued to play "Harder to Breathe" and "This Love", but Maroon 5's newer hits were played only on pop and adult contemporary stations. As of June 2014, the song has sold more than 3.5 million copies in the United States.

"Tangled", the fifth track, was never released as a single. It is another song about a broken relationship, but it's from the point of view of the abuser, instead of the abused. Levine was confessing about certain things that he's done in his love life that he may have regretted. Writers from Billboard rated the song low on their ranking of the album, saying "While 'Tangled' follows a similar formula to several Jane highlights, the energy here falls short, and could use some of the album's more poppier inflections... The intention is there, but the execution falls flat." Though it wasn't all negative, with some positive views: "Levine does hit some soaring notes as he sings lyrics of regret; so don’t be surprised if you catch yourself mouthing the words."

The seventh track, "Must Get Out", was released in Europe as the fifth and final single from the album. Like many songs on the album, it was written by band members Adam Levine and Jesse Carmichael, while production and mixing was done by Matt Wallace. The band's guitarist James Valentine explained that the downtempo song emulates Andy Summers and The Police. Lyrically, "Must Get Out" expresses a tough period of a relationship, with a dreamy lyrical story, where the band "offers up clever imagery with 'I've been the needle and thread/Weaving figures eights and circles 'round your head' and frank confessions to today's problems, 'The city's made us crazy and we must get out'." The single failed to chart in the US, but made the Top 30 in the United Kingdom, Ireland and New Zealand.

"Sunday Morning", the eighth track, was released as the fourth single. It did not reach the chart success of the previous singles, but nevertheless became a hit song and garnered positive reviews from critics. Although the song only peaked at number 31 in the US, it topped the charts in Belgium and reached the top forty in Australia, Hungary, Ireland, the Netherlands, New Zealand, South Korea, and the UK. It was reported that this song was the one that got the band signed to Octone Records, with its executive Ben Berkman calling it "genius". Unlike many other songs on the album, the relationship Levine describes isn’t full of the pain that’s echoed through the rest of the album. Instead, it captures the sweet and tender moments that can outweigh the bad, like waking up next to the one you love on a cold, rainy day.

=== Outtakes ===
Two songs that did not make the cut for the album did release eventually, with "Woman" appearing on the Spider-Man 2 soundtrack, and Ragdoll appearing as a B-Side and on the deluxe editions. A demo version of "Woman" appeared from the album's 10th anniversary edition, was featured on the 2013 Victoria's Secret swimwear video. Another song, "That's Not Enough" was recorded for the album, but this recording has not been released. A demo for the song can be found online. The song "Wasted Years", contrary to popular belief, was not written for Songs About Jane, but instead for the band's eventual sophomore album. The song first appeared on the live album Live – Friday the 13th, and then later the deluxe edition of Overexposed. A demo of the song similar to the demos featured on the 10th Anniversary edition of this album was recorded by Adam Levine and Sam Farrar, but has not been released.

== Track listing ==
All tracks are written by Adam Levine and Jesse Carmichael, except where noted; (Note: The ASCAP Songview database (for distributing royalties) lists every member of the band for each of the album’s songs (Levine, Carmichael, Ryan Dusick, Mickey Madden and James Valentine. Members who didn’t actually write the songs get 10% publishing each, while the percentages of the actual songwriters vary.) All songs on the original album were produced by Matt Wallace. Other producers are noted for the bonus tracks.

Songs About Jane track listing
No.	Title	Writer(s)	Length
1.	"Harder to Breathe"		2:53
2.	"This Love"		3:26
3.	"Shiver"		2:59
4.	"She Will Be Loved"	Levine; James Valentine	4:17
5.	"Tangled"	Levine	3:18
6.	"The Sun"	Levine	4:11
7.	"Must Get Out"		3:59
8.	"Sunday Morning"		4:04
9.	"Secret"		4:55
10.	"Through with You"		3:01
11.	"Not Coming Home"	Levine; Carmichael; Ryan Dusick	4:21
12.	"Sweetest Goodbye"	Levine	4:30
Total length:			45:54

Japanese bonus track
No.	Title	Producer(s)	Length
13.	"Ragdoll"	Russ Kunkel	5:28

Japanese special edition bonus tracks
No.	Title	Producer(s)	Length
14.	"This Love" (Kanye West remix)	Wallace; Mark Endert (add.); West (remix)	3:43
15.	"This Love" (live acoustic)		4:11
16.	"Harder to Breathe" (live acoustic)		3:10

Special edition bonus tracks
No.	Title	Producer(s)	Length
13.	"Ragdoll"	Kunkel	5:28
14.	"Harder to Breathe" (acoustic)		2:56
15.	"This Love" (acoustic)		4:02
16.	"This Love" (Kanye West remix)	Wallace; Endert (add.); West (remix)	3:38

Special tour edition bonus tracks
No.	Title	Writer(s)	Producer(s)	Length
13.	"Ragdoll"		Kunkel	5:28
14.	"This Love" (live in Hamburg)			3:48
15.	"Sunday Morning" (live in Hamburg)			5:39
16.	"Secret" (live in Hamburg)			7:45
17.	"She Will Be Loved" (live in Hamburg)	Levine; Valentine		7:15

10th anniversary edition (disc 2)
No.	Title	Writer(s)	Producer(s)	Length
1.	"Harder to Breathe" (demo)		Jason Lader; Perry Margouleff	2:17
2.	"This Love" (demo)		Lader; Margouleff	3:21
3.	"Shiver" (demo)		Sam Farrar	3:08
4.	"She Will Be Loved" (demo)		Farrar	3:08
5.	"Tangled" (demo)		Farrar	2:44
6.	"The Sun" (demo)		Farrar	3:22
7.	"Must Get Out" (demo)		Farrar	3:17
8.	"Sunday Morning" (demo)		Russ Kunkel; Nathaniel Kunkel	4:12
9.	"Secret" (demo)		R. Kunkel; N. Kunkel	4:09
10.	"Through with You" (demo)		R. Kunkel; N. Kunkel	3:20
11.	"Not Coming Home" (demo)		R. Kunkel; N. Kunkel	3:51
12.	"Sweetest Goodbye" (demo)		Farrar	3:30
13.	"Take What You Want" (demo)	Levine	Farrar	2:25
14.	"Ragdoll" (original demo/non-LP international B-side)		R. Kunkel; N. Kunkel	5:28
15.	"Woman" (demo)	Levine; Carmichael; Valentine; Madden; Dusick	Farrar	4:06
16.	"Chilly Winter" (demo)	Levine	Farrar	2:55
17.	"The Sun" (alternate mix)		Wallace	4:16

Limited edition LP reissue bonus tracks
No.	Title	Writer(s)	Length
13.	"Ragdoll" (demo)
14.	"Woman" (demo)
15.	"Take What You Want" (demo)	Levine
16.	"This Love" (Kanye West remix)
17.	"Hello" (live)	Noel Gallagher; Gary Glitter; Mike Leander
18.	"Wasted Years" (live)	Levine
19.	"Harder to Breathe" (live acoustic)
20.	"This Love" (live acoustic)

== Personnel ==
Credits for Songs About Jane taken from the album's liner notes.

Maroon 5

- Adam Levine – vocals, guitars
- Ryan Dusick – drums, backing vocals on "Harder to Breathe"
- Jesse Carmichael – keyboards, backing vocals on "Sweetest Goodbye"
- James Valentine – guitars
- Mickey Madden – bass

Additional musicians

- Bruce Smith – programming on "Harder to Breathe" and "Tangled"
- John O'Brien – programming on "Shiver" and "Sunday Morning"
- Sam Farrar – programming on "She Will Be Loved"
- Rashida Jones – backing vocals on "Tangled", "Secret", and "Not Coming Home"
- Mystic – backing vocals on "Sunday Morning"
- Mark K. Schoenecker – horns on "Sunday Morning"

Production

- Matt Wallace – production, mixing
- Mark Endert – additional production and mixing on "This Love"
- Michael Barbiero – mixing on "Harder to Breathe"
- Mike Landolt – engineer
- Posie Muliadi – assistant engineer
- Danny Wright – assistant engineer
- Leon Zervos – mastering
- Cey Adams – art direction
- Gregg Gordon – illustrations
- Bobby Carmichael – photography
- Chris McCann – photography
- Neil Zlozower – photography

== Charts ==
=== Weekly charts ===
2002–2005 weekly chart performance for Songs About Jane
Chart (2002–2005)	Peak position
Australian Albums (ARIA)	1
Austrian Albums (Ö3 Austria)	7
Belgian Albums (Ultratop Flanders)	8
Belgian Albums (Ultratop Wallonia)	22
Canadian Albums (Billboard)	3
Danish Albums (Hitlisten)	2
Dutch Albums (Album Top 100)	2
European Albums Chart	4
Finnish Albums (Suomen virallinen lista)	2
French Albums (SNEP)	1
German Albums (Offizielle Top 100)	5
Greek Albums Chart	2
Hungarian Albums (MAHASZ)	36
Irish Albums (IRMA)	1
Italian Albums (FIMI)	10
Japanese Albums (Oricon)	21
Mexican Albums (AMPROFON)	5
New Zealand Albums (RMNZ)	1
Norwegian Albums (VG-lista)	3
Polish Albums (ZPAV)	4
Portuguese Albums (AFP)	5
Scottish Albums (Official Charts)	2
Singaporean Albums (RIAS)	2
South African Albums (RISA)	5
Spanish Albums (Promusicae)	9
Swedish Albums (Sverigetopplistan)	4
Swiss Albums (Schweizer Hitparade)	12
UK Albums (Official Charts)	1
US Billboard 200	6
US Digital Albums (Billboard)	3
US Top Catalog Albums (Billboard)	1
US Top Heatseekers Albums (Billboard)	1

2017–2019 weekly chart performance for Songs About Jane
Chart (2017–2019)	Position
Top Rock & Alternative Albums (Billboard)	13

2022 weekly chart performance for Songs About Jane
Chart (2022)	Position
Greece Albums (Billboard)	10

=== Year-end charts ===
2004 year-end chart performance for Songs About Jane
Chart (2004)	Position
Australian Albums (ARIA)	6
Austrian Albums (Ö3 Austria)	40
Belgian Albums (Ultratop Flanders)	35
Belgian Albums (Ultratop Wallonia)	69
Dutch Albums (Album Top 100)	11
French Albums (SNEP)	100
German Albums (Offizielle Top 100)	25
New Zealand Albums (RMNZ)	10
Swedish Albums (Sverigetopplistan)	34
Swiss Albums (Schweizer Hitparade)	28
UK Albums (OCC)	4
US Billboard 200	15
Worldwide Albums (IFPI)	10

2005 year-end chart performance for Songs About Jane
Chart (2005)	Position
Australian Albums (ARIA)	13
Dutch Albums (Album Top 100)	42
French Albums (SNEP)	59
Japanese Albums (Oricon)	57
Mexican Albums (AMPROFON)	32
New Zealand Albums (RMNZ)	13
UK Albums (OCC)	58
US Billboard 200	38
Worldwide Albums (IFPI)	41

=== Decade-end charts ===
Decade-end chart performance for Songs About Jane
Chart (2000–2009)	Position
Australian Albums (ARIA)	23
UK Albums (OCC)	30

== Certifications ==
Certifications for Songs About Jane
Region	Certification	Certified units/sales
Argentina (CAPIF)	Platinum	40,000^{^}
Argentina (CAPIF) Re-release	2× Platinum	80,000^{^}
Australia (ARIA)	8× Platinum	560,000^{‡}
Austria (IFPI Austria)	Gold	15,000^{*}
Belgium (BRMA)	Gold	25,000^{*}
Brazil (Pro-Música Brasil)	Gold	50,000^{*}
Canada (Music Canada)	3× Platinum	300,000^{^}
Denmark (IFPI Danmark)	Platinum	40,000^{^}
Finland (Musiikkituottajat)	Gold	19,571
France (SNEP)	2× Gold	200,000^{*}
Germany (BVMI)	Platinum	200,000^{^}
Greece (IFPI Greece)	Gold	10,000^{^}
Ireland (IRMA)	2× Platinum	30,000^{^}
Italy (FIMI)	Platinum	50,000^{‡}
Japan (RIAJ)	2× Platinum	500,000^{^}
Mexico (AMPROFON)	Platinum+Gold	150,000^{^}
Netherlands (NVPI)	Platinum	80,000^{^}
New Zealand (RMNZ)	6× Platinum	90,000^{‡}
Norway (IFPI Norway)	Gold	20,000^{*}
Portugal (AFP)	Gold	20,000^{^}
Russia (NFPF)	Platinum	20,000^{*}
Singapore (RIAS)	Platinum	10,000^{*}
Spain (Promusicae)	Gold	50,000^{^}
Sweden (GLF)	Gold	30,000^{^}
Switzerland (IFPI Switzerland)	Gold	20,000^{^}
United Kingdom (BPI)	7× Platinum	2,081,000
United States (RIAA)	4× Platinum	5,149,000
Summaries
Europe (IFPI)	2× Platinum	2,000,000^{*}
^{*} Sales figures based on certification alone.^{^} Shipments figures based on certification alone.^{‡} Sales+streaming figures based on certification alone.

== Release history ==
Release history and formats for Songs About Jane
Country	Date	Edition	Format	Label	Ref.
Worldwide	June 25, 2002	Standard	CD	Octone	
United Kingdom	May 5, 2003	Standard	CD	Octone	
Japan	July 23, 2003	Standard	CD	Sony	
Germany	March 8, 2004	Standard	CD	J	
Spain	April 15, 2004	Standard	CD	J	
Japan	July 21, 2004	Special	CD	Sony	
Various	June 5, 2012	10th Anniversary	CD	A&M Octone	
United States	November 27, 2015	Reissue	Vinyl	Brookvale	
