= Sunday Morning (Maroon 5 song) =

2004 single by Maroon 5

Single by Maroon 5

from the album Songs About Jane
- B-side: "Shiver"; "Through with You"
- Released: November 8, 2004
- Genre: Alternative rock; jazz-funk
- Length: 4:04
- Label: Octone; J
- Songwriters: Jesse Carmichael; Adam Levine
- Producer: Matt Wallace

Maroon 5 singles chronology
"She Will Be Loved" (2004)	"Sunday Morning" (2004)	"Must Get Out" (2005)

Music video
- "Sunday Morning" on YouTube

"Sunday Morning" is a song by American pop rock band Maroon 5. It was released on November 8, 2004, as the fourth single from their debut album Songs About Jane (2002). The single peaked at number 31 in the United States, becoming Maroon 5's fourth top-40 single; it also peaked at number 27 in the United Kingdom and Australia.

An accompanying music video directed by Andy Delaney and Monty Whitebloom under their credit as Big TV and was filmed at Abbey Road Studios and the Otto Dining Lounge in London. It features Maroon 5 performing the song, interspersed with scenes of numerous people singing it at a karaoke bar.

== Song structure ==
"Sunday Morning" has been described as a mid-tempo alternative rock and jazz-funk song. Written in the key of C Major, it follows a simple verse-chorus form preceded by an intro and uses the well known ii-V-I progression. The chords follow a sequence of Dm9-G13-Cmaj9 throughout the song.

== Critical reception ==
Billboard called the single "another can't-miss romp from America's hottest pop-rock band." upon its release. Years later, they called it a "jazzy mid-tempo jam" when including the band's previous single, "'This Love", on their The 50 Greatest Minivan Rock Songs list.

== Music video ==
The music video for "Sunday Morning" premiered on November 17, 2004, on MTV. It was directed by Big TV. The video begins in February, where the band are recording the song at Abbey Road. Three months later, at the Japanese bar a karaoke ascene which starts off with a Japanese man and a pair of women, both blonde and brunette, singing "This Love" and at the end, the band appears to perform the closing moments of the song. Adam Levine says the idea for the video struck the band when they were in Japan and noticed a few of their songs on the karaoke list at a Japanese bar.

== Appearances in other media ==
"Sunday Morning" was featured on the film Something's Gotta Give (2003) and the television shows Joan of Arcadia and Third Watch. The song appeared on the American soundtrack version of the British film Love Actually (2003), along with "Sweetest Goodbye". An acoustic version is featured on the band's live album 1.22.03.Acoustic and appeared in the family comedy film Cheaper by the Dozen 2 (2005). It is also featured on the karaoke video games Lips and Just Sing, both were included as downloadable contents. In 2014, the band's guitarist James Valentine was featured on a cover version of the song performed by Caleb Chapman's Crescent Super Band with singer Madi Christensen. It appeared from the group's album Don't Look Down. "Sunday Morning" was referenced from the 2018 song "Younger" by A Great Big World.

== Remix versions ==
"Sunday Morning" was featured in the remix versions, which includes the "Urban Remix" was created by Mark Batson and the Jazz remix titled "Jazzy Mix", are available on Vinyl, the latter one also appeared on the Songs About Jane: 10th Anniversary Edition (2012), which was entitled as the demo version. Another remix was made by Questlove, appears on the band's remix album Call and Response: The Remix Album (2008).

== Track listing ==
Sunday Morning – single
No.	Title	Length
1.	"Sunday Morning"	4:06
2.	"Shiver" (Live from Hard Rock Live)	3:01
3.	"Through with You" (Live from Hard Rock Live)	3:01

== Personnel ==
Personnel are adapted from the Songs About Jane liner notes.

Maroon 5

- Adam Levine – lead vocals, guitars
- Ryan Dusick – drums
- Jesse Carmichael – keyboards
- James Valentine – guitars
- Mickey Madden – bass guitar

Additional musicians

- John O'Brien – programming
- Mystic – backing vocals
- Mark K. Schoenecker – horns

== Charts ==
=== Weekly charts ===
Weekly chart performance for "Sunday Morning"
Chart (2004–2015)	Peak position
Australia (ARIA)	27
Austria (Ö3 Austria Top 40)	52
Belgium (Ultratip Bubbling Under Flanders)	1
Belgium (Ultratip Bubbling Under Wallonia)	7
Canada AC Top 30 (Radio & Records)	13
Canada CHR/Pop Top 30 (Radio & Records)	23
Canada Hot AC Top 30 (Radio & Records)	3
CIS Airplay (TopHit)	169
Germany (GfK)	83
Hungary (Rádiós Top 40)	16
Ireland (IRMA)	22
Japan Hot 100 (Billboard)	64
Netherlands (Dutch Top 40)	20
Netherlands (Single Top 100)	42
New Zealand (Recorded Music NZ)	21
Romania (Romanian Top 100)	78
Russia Airplay (TopHit)	156
South Korea International Singles (Gaon)	15
Switzerland (Schweizer Hitparade)	87
Ukraine Airplay (TopHit)	74
UK Singles (Official Charts)	27
US Billboard Hot 100	31
US Adult Contemporary (Billboard)	15
US Adult Pop Airplay (Billboard)	4
US Pop Airplay (Billboard)	21

=== Year-end charts ===
Year-end chart performance for "Sunday Morning"
Chart (2005)	Position
Brazil (Crowley)	87
US Adult Contemporary (Billboard)	25
US Adult Top 40 (Billboard)	13
US Mainstream Top 40 (Billboard)	77
Venezuela (Record Report)	16

== Certifications ==
Certifications for "Sunday Morning"
Region	Certification	Certified units/sales
Australia (ARIA)	3× Platinum	210,000^{‡}
Brazil (Pro-Música Brasil)	Gold	30,000^{‡}
Italy (FIMI)	Gold	50,000^{‡}
Japan (RIAJ)	Gold	100,000^{*}
New Zealand (RMNZ)	4× Platinum	120,000^{‡}
South Korea	—	2,500,000
Spain (Promusicae)	Gold	30,000^{‡}
United Kingdom (BPI)	Platinum	600,000^{‡}
United States (RIAA)	2× Platinum	1,454,000
^{*} Sales figures based on certification alone.^{‡} Sales+streaming figures based on certification alone.

== Release history ==
Release dates and formats for "Sunday Morning"
Region	Date	Format	Label(s)	Ref.
United States	November 8, 2004	Contemporary hit radio	Octone; J	
United Kingdom	December 6, 2004	CD	Octone; J	
Australia	January 17, 2005	CD	Universal	
