= James Valentine =

James Valentine may refer to:

- James Valentine (broadcaster) (1961–2026), Australian musician
- James Valentine (guitarist) (born 1978), guitarist of American band Maroon 5
- James Valentine (photographer) (1815–1879), Scottish photographer
- Jim Valentine (1866–1904), English rugby union footballer
- James Valentine (RFC officer) (1887–1917), early English aviator and Royal Flying Corps pilot
- James W. Valentine (1926–2023), American evolutionary biologist
