= She Will Be Loved =

2004 single by Maroon 5

Single by Maroon 5

from the album Songs About Jane
- Released: June 21, 2004
- Studio: Rumbo (Los Angeles)
- Genre: Pop rock; soft rock; blue-eyed soul
- Length: 4:17 (album version); 4:19 (radio mix); 3:59 (radio edit)
- Label: Octone; J
- Songwriters: Adam Levine; James Valentine
- Producer: Matt Wallace

Maroon 5 singles chronology
"This Love" (2004)	"She Will Be Loved" (2004)	"Sunday Morning" (2004)

Music video
- "She Will Be Loved" on YouTube

"She Will Be Loved" is a song by American pop rock band Maroon 5. It was written by front-man Adam Levine and lead guitarist James Valentine. The song was released on June 21, 2004, as the third single from Maroon 5's 2002 debut album, Songs About Jane. The single peaked at No. 5 in the United States and by December 2012 had sold more than 2,722,000 digital downloads. It peaked at No. 4 in the United Kingdom. In Australia, it reached No. 1, a position it held for five non-consecutive weeks. The single is noted for its music video starring Kelly Preston in a mother-daughter love triangle with lead singer Adam Levine.

The song proved as successful as the band's previous hits, "This Love" and "Harder to Breathe", hitting number 1 on the Mainstream Top 40 and Adult Top 40 charts, but it prompted many alternative radio outlets to remove Maroon 5 from their playlists, on the grounds that the band's newer songs were too light. As of June 2014, the song has sold more than 3.5 million copies in the United States.

== Composition ==
"She Will Be Loved" has been described as "Red Hot Chili Peppers flavored," combining pop rock, soft rock, blue-eyed soul and elements of alternative rock into a "romantic, sentimental and beautiful" ballad. Sheet music for the song is in the key of C minor (with the chorus in the relative key of E-flat major) in common time, with a moderate tempo of 104 beats per minute.

== Music videos ==
=== Scrapped version ===
The first video for "She Will Be Loved" was filmed, but later scrapped to re-shoot with the new version. In the video, Maroon 5 performed the song in a house with scenes of them rotating in every scene, including a party and the relationship between a man (portrayed by Adam Levine) and his love interest by actress Elisha Cuthbert. The band themselves wearing outfits similar to the ones in the single's cover art.

=== Official version ===
The second music video for "She Will Be Loved" premiered on MTV's TRL, on July 16, 2004. Directed by Sophie Muller, with original sequence by Johanna Bautista (Sweetheart Massive Attack) tells a sad love story, featuring a lovelorn socialite (Kelly Preston) and her rich, deadbeat, abusive husband (John Colton), whose relationship is juxtaposed with that of their daughter's (Corinne Carrey) relationship with a young man (Levine). The younger man, however, constantly obsesses over his girlfriend's mother, understanding that, although she is constantly rejected by her husband and that her life is one of emotional anxiety, she is nonetheless beautiful and attractive, and possibly more so than his own girlfriend.

The video is often compared to the 1967 film The Graduate, as it has similarities with the storyline between the daughter, the boyfriend and the mother. Adam Levine explained about the video: "Maybe take some beautiful shots from that movie, which is one of our favorite movies of all time". The music video was uploaded on the band's YouTube channel on June 16, 2009. The version of the song used in the video is the radio mix version found on the 10th anniversary edition of Songs About Jane.

== Live version ==
The band was invited to play the song at the request of George Lucas for his AFI Life Achievement Award ceremony. They were his daughters' favorite artists. The band was introduced by actor Jimmy Smits.

== Reception ==
=== Commercial performance ===
"She Will Be Loved" entered the Billboard Hot 100 at No. 50 as the Hot Shot debut of the week on July 24, 2004. The song rose to No. 20 on August 21, 2004, giving Maroon 5 its third consecutive Top 20 hit on the chart. "She Will Be Loved" continued to gain in performance and rose to No. 9 on September 11, 2004, becoming Maroon 5's second top-ten hit from Songs About Jane after the band's previous hit "This Love". The song reached its peak position at No. 5 on September 25, 2004, matching the peak position of "This Love" from earlier that year. It fell to No. 6 a week later and stayed in that position for three weeks, before rising back up to No. 5 on October 23, 2004, for two more consecutive weeks. "She Will Be Loved" was certified platinum on April 18, 2011, by the Recording Industry Association of America (RIAA) and has sold 3,558,083 copies in the US as of June 15, 2014. It was certified four-times platinum on September 13, 2018. Outside the US, the single reached number one in Australia, Belgium, Mexico, and Venezuela.

=== Critical reception ===
"She Will Be Loved" is widely considered to be one of the band's best songs. In 2022, Billboard and American Songwriter both ranked the song number five on their lists of the 10 greatest Maroon 5 songs.

=== Awards and achievements ===
In 2005, the song was nominated at the 47th Annual Grammy Awards in the Best Pop Performance by a Duo or Group with Vocals category but lost to Heaven by Los Lonely Boys.

== Other versions ==
Two different versions of the song were featured: an acoustic version that appeared on Maroon 5's live album 1.22.03.Acoustic (2004), and a Cuban version from the album Rhythms del Mundo: Cuba (2006).

== Commercial uses ==
In 2004, Vodafone Australia began operations and have for twenty consecutive years used this song as their hold/transfer background music.

== Track listings ==
Australian CD single

1. "She Will Be Loved" (radio edit) – 3:59
2. "This Love" (Kanye West remix)" – 3:42
3. "Closer" (live acoustic version) – 4:30

European CD single

1. "She Will Be Loved" (radio edit) – 3:59
2. "She Will Be Loved" (album version) – 4:17

UK CD single

1. "She Will Be Loved" (radio edit) – 3:59
2. "She Will Be Loved" (live acoustic version) – 4:39

German maxi-single and UK CD single 2

1. "She Will Be Loved" (album version) – 4:36* (Note: Although single back cover and inlay CD states the album version length at 4:36, they made a misprint: it is the standard 4:18 that can be found on every other CD single containing the album version track.)
2. "This Love" (live acoustic version) – 4:36
3. "This Love" (Kanye West remix) – 3:42
4. "She Will Be Loved" (video) – 4:26

US 12-inch vinyl

1. "She Will Be Loved" (radio edit) – 3:59
2. "Sunday Morning" (album version) – 4:06

== Personnel ==
Credits adapted from the Songs About Jane liner notes.

Maroon 5

- Adam Levine – vocals, guitars
- Ryan Dusick – drums
- Jesse Carmichael – keyboards
- James Valentine – guitars
- Mickey Madden – bass guitar

Additional musicians

- Sam Farrar – programming

== Charts ==
=== Weekly charts ===
Chart (2004–2005)	Peak position
Australia (ARIA)	1
Austria (Ö3 Austria Top 40)	27
Belgium (Ultratop 50 Flanders)	27
Belgium (Ultratip Bubbling Under Wallonia)	1
Canada AC Top 30 (Radio & Records)	1
Canada CHR/Pop Top 30 (Radio & Records)	2
Canada Hot AC Top 30 (Radio & Records)	1
CIS Airplay (TopHit)	7
Croatia (HRT)	2
France (SNEP)	23
Germany (GfK)	25
Greece (IFPI)	11
Hungary (Rádiós Top 40)	9
Ireland (IRMA)	3
Italy (FIMI)	3
Mexican Airplay Chart (Billboard International)	1
Netherlands (Dutch Top 40)	6
Netherlands (Single Top 100)	25
New Zealand (Recorded Music NZ)	18
Poland (Nielsen Music Control)	2
Russia Airplay (TopHit)	4
Scottish Singles Sales (Official Charts)	2
South Korea International Chart (Gaon)	46
Switzerland (Schweizer Hitparade)	18
Ukraine Airplay (TopHit)	124
UK Singles (Official Charts)	4
UK Airplay (Music Week)	2
US Billboard Hot 100	5
US Adult Contemporary (Billboard)	4
US Adult Pop Airplay (Billboard)	1
US Pop Airplay (Billboard)	1
US Rock Digital Songs (Billboard)	14
Venezuela Pop/Rock Songs (Record Report)	1

Chart (2025–2026)	Peak position
Philippines (Philippines Hot 100)	47

=== Year-end charts ===
Chart (2004)	Position
Australia (ARIA)	13
CIS Airplay (TopHit)	22
Italy (FIMI)	38
Netherlands (Dutch Top 40)	40
Russia Airplay (TopHit)	13
UK Singles (OCC)	55
UK Airplay (Music Week)	21
US Billboard Hot 100	35
US Adult Contemporary (Billboard)	47
US Adult Top 40 (Billboard)	17
US Mainstream Top 40 (Billboard)	13

Chart (2005)	Position
Brazil (Crowley)	25
Hungary (Rádiós Top 40)	94
Romania (Romanian Top 100)	32
UK Airplay (Music Week)	47
US Billboard Hot 100	61
US Adult Contemporary (Billboard)	5
US Adult Top 40 (Billboard)	12
US Mainstream Top 40 (Billboard)	82

Chart (2015)	Position
South Korea International Chart (Gaon)	99

Chart (2025)	Position
Philippines (Philippines Hot 100)	97

=== Decade-end charts ===
Chart (2000–2009)	Position
US Adult Top 40 (Billboard)	20

== Certifications ==
Region	Certification	Certified units/sales
Australia (ARIA)	9× Platinum	630,000^{‡}
Brazil (Pro-Música Brasil)	Platinum	60,000^{‡}
Canada (Music Canada)	Platinum	80,000^{*}
Denmark (IFPI Danmark)	2× Platinum	180,000^{‡}
Germany (BVMI)	Gold	150,000^{‡}
Italy (FIMI)	Platinum	50,000^{‡}
Mexico (AMPROFON) Pre-loaded	Platinum+Gold	150,000^{*}
New Zealand (RMNZ)	6× Platinum	180,000^{‡}
Spain (Promusicae)	2× Platinum	120,000^{‡}
United Kingdom (BPI)	4× Platinum	2,400,000^{‡}
United States (RIAA)	4× Platinum	4,000,000
Streaming
Denmark (IFPI Danmark)	Gold	900,000^{†}
^{*} Sales figures based on certification alone.^{‡} Sales+streaming figures based on certification alone.^{†} Streaming-only figures based on certification alone.

== Release history ==
Region	Date	Format	Label	Ref.
United States	June 21, 2004	Contemporary hit radio	Octone; J	
Australia	August 16, 2004	CD	Octone; J	
United Kingdom	August 23, 2004	CD	Octone; J	
