= This Love (Maroon 5 song) =

2004 single by Maroon 5

Single by Maroon 5

from the album Songs About Jane
- Released: January 12, 2004
- Genre: Pop rock; funk-pop; alternative rock; blue-eyed soul
- Length: 3:27
- Label: Octone; J
- Songwriters: Adam Levine; Jesse Carmichael
- Producers: Matt Wallace; Mark Endert

Maroon 5 singles chronology
| "Harder to Breathe" (2002) | "This Love" (2004) | "She Will Be Loved" (2004) |

Music video
- "This Love" on YouTube

"This Love" is a song by the American pop rock band Maroon 5. It was released on January 12, 2004, as the second single from their debut album Songs About Jane (2002). The track is built around a distinctive piano line and repeating guitar riff. The lyrics are based on the band's lead vocalist Adam Levine's break-up with an ex-girlfriend. He revealed that the song was written in the "most emotionally trying time" in his life. He has also described the lyrics of this song as being extremely erotic. "This Love" was critically acclaimed by music critics, who lauded the track's musical scope and production.

The song entered the top 10 on several music charts, topping several US Billboard component charts as well as the Czech, Greek, Hungarian, and Polish singles charts. The music video met with controversy, regarding extended intimate scenes between Levine and his girlfriend. "This Love" helped Maroon 5 win the MTV Video Music Award for Best New Artist and was the third-most-played song of 2004. The live version of the song won Best Pop Performance by a Duo or Group with Vocals at the 2006 Grammy Awards. "This Love" is one of Maroon 5's most successful singles.

== Background ==
"This Love" was the second single from Maroon 5's debut studio album after renaming, Songs About Jane (2002). In an interview with MTV News in August 2002, Levine revealed that he wrote the song the day his girlfriend moved away after they broke up. In another interview, Levine revealed that the song was written in the "most emotionally trying time" in his life. He also added, "I was in a relationship that was ending, but I was really excited on the other end because the band was about to go make the record and I was ecstatic to go in the studio. She was literally leaving town within days of me writing the lyrics to 'This Love', so I was in prime emotional condition to write a song with that kind of conflict."

== Composition and lyrics ==
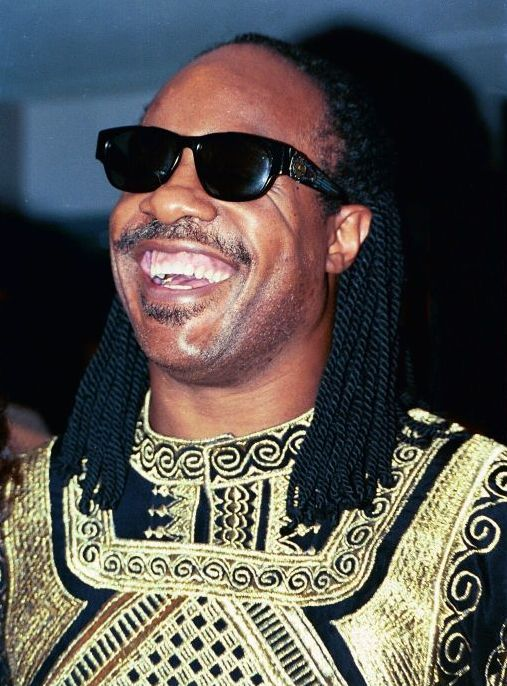
"This Love" was inspired by and features vocals reminiscent of American musician Stevie Wonder.

During the development of "This Love", the band stated that the song was influenced by American musician Stevie Wonder. The piece was written in the key of C minor with a metre set in common time, and a moderate tempo of 95 beats per minute. The introduction of "This Love" features a piano-led strut, transitioning into what Maroon 5 themselves call "prime pop rock." Critics have described the song as "slick pop funk," combining a pop rock and alternative rock-guitar crunch, with hip-hop-influenced blue-eyed soul. In an alternate extended version of the song, which is four minutes and 26 seconds long, the chorus of the band's next single, "She Will Be Loved", can be heard from 3:21 to 3:42, during the outro, while the demo of the song features a guitar solo.

According to Johnny Loftus of AllMusic, the song has "a slick channeling of vintage R&B rhythms into punchy pop dynamics". Loftus felt that the song features "Levine's wry falsetto around strutting, bottom-heavy piano and percussion both programmed and live; chirping backup vocals and washes of sunny synth and flute acted as counterweights," Loftus also noted that the band has a "sexual charge" with the lyrics, "I tried my best to feed her appetite / To keep her coming every night / So hard to keep her satisfied". Steve Morse of The Boston Globe described the single's sounds as "a rocking yet soulful tale about the breakup of a relationship", while Meghan Bard of The Daily Campus added that the song features "Stevie Wonder-esque vocals and a funky R&B beat".

In an interview with Rolling Stone, when asked about the lyrics "Keep her coming every night" and "Sinking my fingertips into every inch of you", Levine said: "Yep, that's sexual, all right. I was so sick of typical lyrics like 'Ooh, baby' and 'I love you' and all this vague shit. I thought the more explicit I got without being totally explicit was a nice approach. The little girls would enjoy them, and it would go right over my grandparents' heads. But it would hit my ex-girlfriend like a ton of bricks. It was perfect." He also comments on how MTV played an edited version of the song for the music video, with the word "coming" edited out of the line "keep her coming every night". Levine noted, "MTV has now edited the language. They won't let me say, 'Keep her coming every night', and they took the sinking out of 'sinking my fingertips'. It's like communist China. It's totally bizarre."

== Reception ==
The song received critical acclaim. In the Rolling Stone review of the album, critic Christian Hoard wrote: "Adam Levine's urban-romantic swoonings work best when his band really gets up on the good foot, as on 'This Love', which uses piano and James Brown-like guitars to create a foundation on which Levine can obsess about beauty (including his own)." Jason Thompson of PopMatters noted that on the songs "This Love" and "Must Get Out", keyboardist Jesse Carmichael "manages to conjure up both the productions of Britney Spears and The New Radicals respectively". Sam Beresky of the Daily Lobo, who was less enthusiastic about the album, complimented the band on "This Love", in which he noted, "...'This Love', is a happier version of the first with a great backbeat reminiscent of Stevie Wonder's 'Superstition'. It might make a foot tap, a head nod or even a booty shake if played at a loud volume."

In May 2004, musician John Mayer told Rolling Stone that he liked the band's album Songs About Jane. Mayer was also positive towards the song. "Once I heard 'This Love,' it was a light-fuse/stand-back kind of situation. It's one of those perfect songs you always hope to write." The single also strengthened Maroon 5's appeal, and helped position them as one of the year's break-out bands in 2004. It has since been remixed by Kanye West, titled "This Love (Kanye West remix)", in May 2004. The band released an EP titled 1.22.03.Acoustic, which features an acoustic version of "This Love."

"This Love" is widely considered to be one of the band's best songs. In 2022, Billboard and American Songwriter both ranked the song number two on their lists of the 10 greatest Maroon 5 songs.

== Chart performance ==
"This Love" appeared on the Billboard Hot 100, peaking at No. 5. The track's Junior Vasquez Mixes remix topped the Billboard Hot Dance Music/Club Play chart. It also appeared in the Hot Dance Airplay chart at No. 18. "This Love" reached No. 1 on Billboard's Top 40 Mainstream. It also reached the top spot on Billboard's Hot Adult Top 40 Tracks at the No. 1 spot, it stayed there for 10 weeks. The song was the top digital download of 2004. In 2007, the song re-entered the chart at the No. 36 position on Billboard's Hot Digital Songs. As of June 2014, the song has sold 2,120,000 copies in the US.

"This Love" reached the Top 10 in twelve countries. In the United Kingdom, it reached the No. 3 spot in the UK Singles Chart on May 1, 2004. It entered the top ten in France, Belgium, and Australia. The single reached the top five in Norway, Switzerland, Netherlands, Austria, and New Zealand. Elsewhere, "This Love" appeared on the Italy, Swiss, Germany, and Ireland music charts.

== Music video ==
Uncensored (top) and censored (bottom) music video for "This Love"

The music video for "This Love" premiered on MTV's Total Request Live on January 6, 2004. Directed by Sophie Muller, the video combines performance footage from the band in a courtyard built at Mack Sennett Studios and scenes of Adam Levine parting ways with a woman. According to Levine, the concept behind the music video was based on Prince. "An overt sexuality confuses people, too. That video was a very 'pop star' thing to do."

The music video also features Levine and his then-girlfriend, model Kelly McKee in a few intimate scenes. The video used creative camera angles, in an effort to avoid action from the Federal Communications Commission for television broadcasts. A version of the video where a stream of computer-generated flowers obscure the screen further was also created. When asked about the video, Levine said: "It was surprisingly not weird and surprisingly not sexual. It was totally comfortable. I didn't get horny or anything, which was weird since I shot it with my girlfriend."

The video was still seen as controversial, with Sylvia Patterson of The Daily Telegraph describing it as "a porno-pop video". Bass player Michael Madden, asked to comment on the video's reception, referred to the controversy as "an absurd over-reaction."

== Live performances and accolades ==
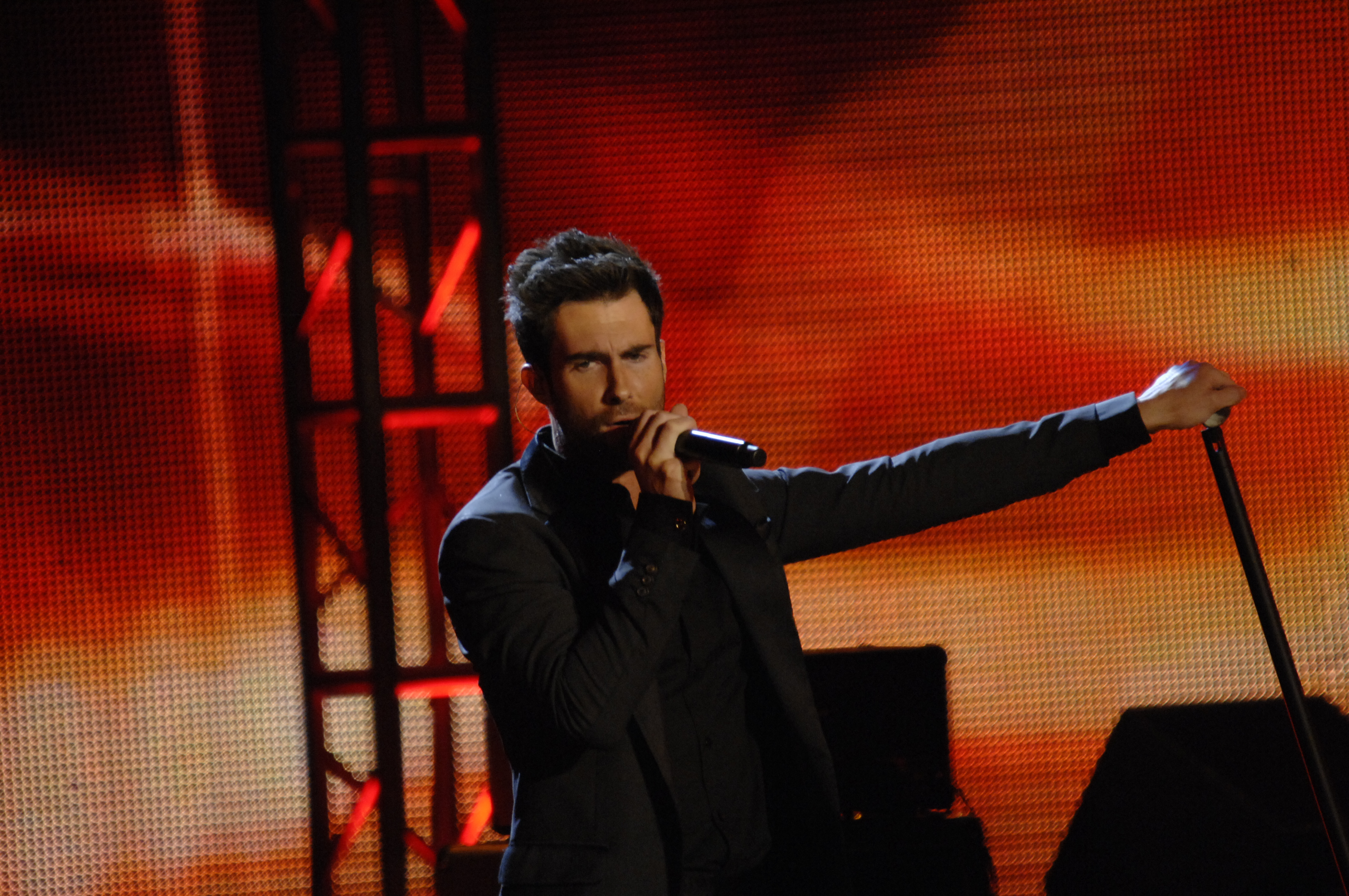
Adam Levine singing "This Love" at the 2009 Neighborhood Inauguration Ball

Maroon 5 performed "This Love" live on Saturday Night Live (SNL) in February 2004. The band won the MTV Video Music Award for Best New Artist for the music video of "This Love" in 2004. Also the same year, the song won for Choice Rock Track at the Teen Choice Awards. In the Nielsen Broadcast Data Systems, "This Love" was the third played song of 2004, having 438,589 total plays. At the 48th Grammy Awards, the song won a Grammy Award in the category for Best Pop Performance by a Duo or Group with Vocal.

== Personnel ==
Personnel are adapted from the Songs About Jane liner notes.

Maroon 5

- Adam Levine – vocals, guitars
- Ryan Dusick – drums
- Jesse Carmichael – keyboards
- James Valentine – guitars
- Mickey Madden – bass guitar

== Charts ==
=== Weekly charts ===
2004 weekly chart performance for "This Love"
| Chart (2004) | Peak position |
|---|---|
| Australia (ARIA) | 8 |
| Austria (Ö3 Austria Top 40) | 3 |
| Belgium (Ultratop 50 Flanders) | 21 |
| Belgium (Ultratop 50 Wallonia) | 7 |
| Canada AC Top 30 (Radio & Records) | 1 |
| Canada CHR/Pop Top 30 (Radio & Records) | 2 |
| Canada Hot AC Top 30 (Radio & Records) | 1 |
| CIS Airplay (TopHit) | 2 |
| Croatia (HRT) | 8 |
| Czech Republic (IFPI) | 1 |
| Europe (Eurochart Hot 100) | 8 |
| France (SNEP) | 6 |
| Germany (GfK) | 5 |
| Greece (IFPI) | 1 |
| Hungary (Rádiós Top 40) | 1 |
| Ireland (IRMA) | 6 |
| Italy (FIMI) | 3 |
| Netherlands (Dutch Top 40) | 3 |
| Netherlands (Single Top 100) | 5 |
| New Zealand (Recorded Music NZ) | 4 |
| Norway (VG-lista) | 3 |
| Poland (Polish Airplay Charts) | 1 |
| Romania (Romanian Top 100) | 2 |
| Russia Airplay (TopHit) | 2 |
| Scotland Singles (Official Charts) | 3 |
| Sweden (Sverigetopplistan) | 26 |
| Switzerland (Schweizer Hitparade) | 4 |
| Ukraine Airplay (TopHit) | 135 |
| UK Singles (Official Charts) | 3 |
| US Billboard Hot 100 | 5 |
| US Adult Alternative Airplay (Billboard) | 14 |
| US Adult Contemporary (Billboard) | 3 |
| US Adult Pop Airplay (Billboard) | 1 |
| US Dance Club Songs (Billboard) | 21 |
| US Dance Airplay (Billboard) | 18 |
| US Pop Airplay (Billboard) | 1 |
| Venezuela Pop/Rock Songs (Record Report) | 1 |

2012 weekly chart performance for "This Love"
| Chart (2012) | Peak position |
|---|---|
| South Korea International (Gaon) | 59 |

2017 weekly chart performance for "This Love"
| Chart (2017) | Peak position |
|---|---|
| Ukraine Airplay (TopHit) | 88 |

2025 weekly chart performance for "This Love"
| Chart (2025) | Peak position |
|---|---|
| Poland (Polish Airplay Top 100) | 92 |

=== Year-end charts ===
2004 year-end chart performance for "This Love"
| Chart (2004) | Position |
|---|---|
| Australia (ARIA) | 60 |
| Austria (Ö3 Austria Top 40) | 19 |
| Belgium (Ultratop 50 Flanders) | 69 |
| Belgium (Ultratop 50 Wallonia) | 34 |
| Brazil (Crowley) | 21 |
| CIS Airplay (TopHit) | 45 |
| France (SNEP) | 77 |
| Germany (Media Control GfK) | 26 |
| Hungary (Rádiós Top 40) | 15 |
| Italy (FIMI) | 12 |
| Netherlands (Dutch Top 40) | 11 |
| Netherlands (Single Top 100) | 25 |
| New Zealand (RIANZ) | 39 |
| Russia Airplay (TopHit) | 26 |
| Switzerland (Schweizer Hitparade) | 19 |
| UK Singles (OCC) | 39 |
| US Billboard Hot 100 | 4 |
| US Adult Contemporary (Billboard) | 12 |
| US Adult Top 40 (Billboard) | 1 |
| US Mainstream Top 40 (Billboard) | 3 |

2005 year-end chart performance for "This Love"
| Chart (2005) | Position |
|---|---|
| US Adult Contemporary (Billboard) | 13 |

2011 year-end chart performance for "This Love"
| Chart (2011) | Position |
|---|---|
| Ukraine Airplay (TopHit) | 181 |

2024 year-end chart performance for "This Love"
| Chart (2024) | Position |
|---|---|
| Kazakhstan Airplay (TopHit) | 185 |

Year-end chart performance
| Chart (2025) | Position |
|---|---|
| Argentina Anglo Airplay (Monitor Latino) | 63 |

== Certifications and sales ==
Certifications and sales for "This Love"
| Region | Certification | Certified units/sales |
|---|---|---|
| Australia (ARIA) | 6× Platinum | 420,000^{‡} |
| Brazil (Pro-Música Brasil) | Gold | 30,000^{‡} |
| Canada (Music Canada) | Platinum | 80,000^{*} |
| Denmark (IFPI Danmark) | Platinum | 90,000^{‡} |
| Germany (BVMI) | Gold | 150,000^{‡} |
| Italy (FIMI) | Platinum | 100,000^{‡} |
| Japan (RIAJ) | Gold | 100,000^{*} |
| Mexico (AMPROFON) Pre-loaded | Platinum+Gold | 150,000^{*} |
| New Zealand (RMNZ) | 4× Platinum | 120,000^{‡} |
| South Korea | — | 1,168,853 |
| Spain (Promusicae) | Platinum | 60,000^{‡} |
| United Kingdom (BPI) | 2× Platinum | 1,200,000^{‡} |
| United States (RIAA) | 2× Platinum | 2,120,000 |
^{*} Sales figures based on certification alone.^{‡} Sales+streaming figures based on certification alone.

== Release history ==
Release dates and formats for "This Love"
| Region | Date | Format | Version(s) | Label(s) | Ref. |
|---|---|---|---|---|---|
| United States | January 12, 2004 | Contemporary hit radio | Original | Octone; J | |
| Australia | March 8, 2004 | CD | Original | Octone; J | |
| United Kingdom | April 19, 2004 | CD | Original | Octone; J | |
| Various | May 2004 | CD | Acoustic; Kanye West remix | Octone; J | |
