= Rihwa =

Japanese musician (born 1989)

Rihwa リファ
- Born: Park Ri-hwa (박리화); October 4, 1989 (age 36)
- Origin: Sapporo, Hokkaido, Japan
- Genres: J-pop
- Occupation: Singer-songwriter
- Instruments: Singing, acoustic guitar
- Years active: 2010–present
- Labels: Toy's Factory (2012–present)
- Website: www.rihwa.net

Rihwa (リファ) (born October 4, 1989 as Park Rihwa (Korean: 박리화; Kanji: 朴梨華; Japanese: パク・リファ Paku Rifa) Japanese-born Korean singer active in Japan. She is represented by Toy's Factory and managed by Amuse, Inc.

== Biography ==
Rihwa was born and raised in Sapporo until she graduated junior high school. She is considered to be Zainichi Korean. She then went on to study overseas in Belleville, Ontario, for her high school education. She returned to Japan in 2009 after she graduated. She started her career as a singer by releasing her first of three singles entitled "Private" beginning on May 18, 2010. In January 2012, Rihwa released her first album Private #0 and moved to Tokyo.

On April 20, 2012, it was announced that Rihwa had been signed to major label Toy's Factory. She then made her major label debut with the single "Change".

== Discography ==
=== Singles ===
Title	Release Date	Peak chart positions	
Title	Release Date	Oricon	Japan Hot 100
Indie Label
"Private #1"	May 18, 2010	—	—
"Private #2"	December 8, 2010	—	—
"Private #3"	June 8, 2011	—	—
Major Label
"Change"	July 11, 2012	68	24
"Promise" (約束)	October 3, 2012	14	30
"Hide and Seek with a Monster"/"Good Love" with Michelle Branch (モンスターのかくれんぼ)	February 20, 2013	80	55
"Last Love"	June 5, 2013	13	9
"Spring Breeze" (春風)	February 26, 2014	7	2
"—" denotes releases that did not chart or were not released in that region. "×" denotes periods where charts did not exist or were not archived.

=== Albums ===
Release date	Title	Format	Peak position
Indie Label
January 1, 2012	Private #0	CD	—
Major Label
April 2, 2014	Borderless	CD, CD&DVD, Digital	10
October 31, 2018	Wild Inside	CD, CD&DVD, Digital	50
May 1, 2020	Who You R	CD, CD&DVD, Digital	82
