= Janek Gwizdala =

English jazz bassist

- Born: 19 November 1978 (age 47); London, England
- Genres: Jazz, jazz fusion
- Occupations: Musician, composer
- Instrument: Bass guitar
- Years active: 1999–present
- Website: janekgwizdala.com

Janek Gwizdala (born 19 November 1978) is an English jazz bassist.

== Biography ==
Gwizdala initially preferred drums, but switched to bass guitar after hearing Laurence Cottle. Gwizdala later moved to the U.S. to attend Berklee College of Music.

== Recordings as a leader ==
Mystery to Me, released in 2004, was recorded at Manhattan Center Studios in front of an audience in one take.

Live at the 55bar was recorded live over two nights in November 2007 and released on 7 February 2008.

== Discography ==
=== As leader ===
- Mystery to Me - 2004
- Live at the 55bar - 2008
- The Space in Between - 2010
- It Only Happens Once - 2012
- Theatre by the Sea - 2013
- Motion Picture - 2014
- American Elm - 2016
- Bass Duo - 2017
- The Union - 2019
- One Way Out - 2022
- Night Watch - 2023
- Mystery to Me (20th Anniversary Edition) - 2024
- Found - 2025
- Quiet Places - 2026

=== As sideman ===
- Yazz Ahmed, Finding My Way Home (Suntara, 2011)
- Peter Erskine, Dr. Um (Fuzzy Music, 2016)
- Ronny Jordan, At Last (N-Coded, 2003)
- Bob Reynolds, Runway (2020)
- Kazumi Watanabe, Tricoroll (EWE, 2011)
- Kazumi Watanabe, Live at Iridium (EWE, 2012)
