= James Valentine (guitarist) =

American guitarist (born 1978)

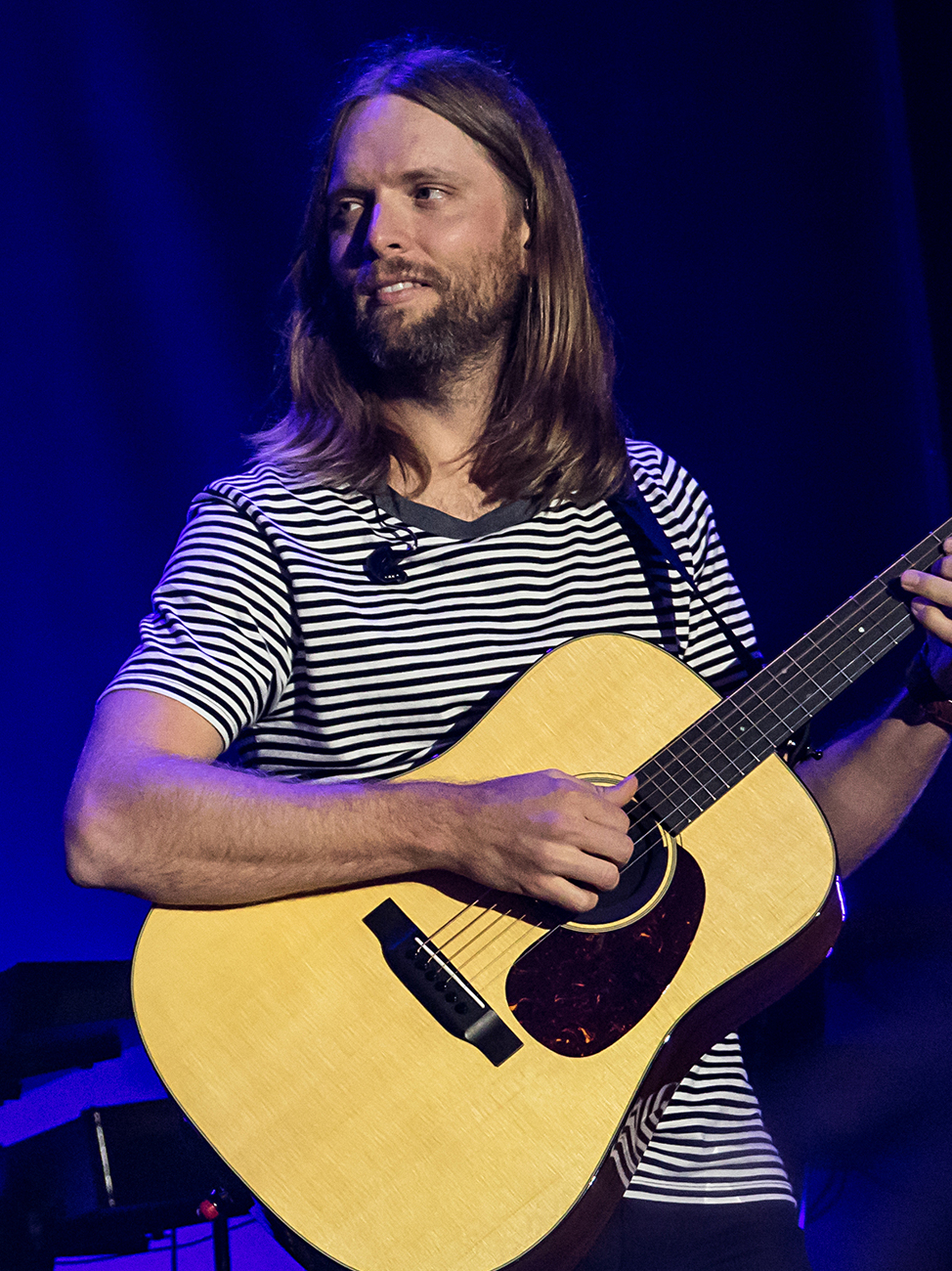
- Valentine with Maroon 5 in 2016

Background information
- Born: James Burgon Valentine; October 5, 1978 (age 48); Lincoln, Nebraska, U.S.
- Genres: Alternative rock; pop rock; funk rock
- Occupations: Musician; Songwriter; Composer
- Instrument: Guitar
- Years active: 1996–present
- Member of: Maroon 5
- Formerly of: Square; JJAMZ
- Spouse: Alexis Novak (m. 2023)

James Burgon Valentine (born October 5, 1978) is an American musician who is the lead guitarist and backing vocalist for the Pop rock band Maroon 5.

== Early life ==
Valentine was born in Lincoln, Nebraska. He was raised as a member of the Church of Jesus Christ of Latter-day Saints (LDS Church) and has three sisters and one brother. His mother is a former beauty queen, who was a school teacher before becoming a stay-at-home mom to raise her five children. His younger sister, Amanda Valentine, has been a contestant on Project Runway two times starring in Season 11 and Season 13, as well as Project Runway All Stars once in Season 6. James is an Eagle Scout and was the president of his high school Lincoln Southeast High School's student council in Lincoln, Nebraska. He left before graduating (had one semester left per an interview he did) from the University of Nebraska–Lincoln and attended Berklee College of Music.

In addition to guitar, Valentine is also a percussionist, playing in orchestra and jazz band in his youth.

== Career ==
Valentine played in Lincoln bands: Montag, Kid Quarkstar, Mondello and Happy Dog. In 2000, Happy Dog changed its name to Square and he moved to Los Angeles from Anaheim, California, where he taught private guitar lessons out of his home. Valentine had also played with Reel Big Fish, firstly when guitarist Aaron Barrett broke his hand in 2000, and later in 2001, when Barrett fell down some stairs. Valentine displayed a picture from one Reel Big Fish show he played during Maroon 5's appearance on MTV Cribs. Eventually the members of Square and Kara's Flowers became friends and when Adam Levine, Jesse Carmichael, Mickey Madden and Ryan Dusick began looking for another guitarist, Valentine was approached. Personal tensions in Square helped the decision to join the band and shortly afterward, Kara's Flowers became Maroon 5.

Valentine is a friend of John Mayer, whom he met in 1996 at Berklee College of Music in Boston, Massachusetts. Valentine once tried to get Mayer to move to Lincoln to play guitar for the Lincoln blues rock band Baby Jason and the Spankers. An opening slot on Mayer's 2003 summer tour helped bring widespread exposure to Maroon 5. Valentine contributed guitar work to Mayer's September 2006 release Continuum on the songs "Stop This Train" and "In Repair."

Valentine also played guitar on Jenny Lewis' 2006 solo album, Rabbit Fur Coat with The Watson Twins and has appeared in her music video for the first single, "Rise Up with Fists!!". Valentine was featured on a cover version of the Maroon 5 song "Sunday Morning", performed by Caleb Chapman's Crescent Super Band with singer Madi Christensen from the group's album Don't Look Down (2014).

In 2016, Valentine partnered with Ernie Ball Music Man to release his signature "Valentine" electric guitar.

In 2024, James Valentine composed the original score for the short film American Cancer Story, directed by José Padilha. The film addresses issues related to childhood cancer and gun violence in the United States. Valentine, stated that he was “drawn to this project because I've been concerned about these two issues for a very long time.” The project received recognition at the Clio Awards for its creative execution, with Valentine's score included as part of the awarded work.

Mayor of Lincoln Leirion Gaylor Baird announced in October 2025, ahead of a concert by the band at Pinnacle Bank Arena, that a stretch of Canopy Street in the city’s Railyard would temporarily be renamed “James Valentine Blvd" after Valentine, a Lincoln native and Maroon 5 guitarist. Signs marking the event were put up through Oct. 29.

=== Phases ===
Phases (originally called JJAMZ) was a supergroup composed of Valentine, Jason Boesel (Rilo Kiley/Conor Oberst), Alex Greenwald (Phantom Planet), Michael Runion (solo), and Z Berg (The Like). The group was started at karaoke night at Guys in Hollywood. The band name was an acronym using the first letter of each member's name and was means of escape from each member's respective bands. "[Phases] started at an interesting time in all of our lives. We all needed some kind of escape from relationships or our other bands. It was a tumultuous time, and the lyrics just came out. It was like word vomit. I can't remember." said Z Berg, lead vocalist for the Like. The band played their first concert at the Echo Plex on January 27, 2009. They released their debut album Suicide Pact on July 10, 2012. Later, Valentine left the band due to work with Maroon 5 and the band changed their name to Phases, before quietly going on hiatus the following year, followed by a one-off reunion in 2021.

== Personal life ==
Valentine was reportedly in a relationship with singer Katy Perry around 2010.

He has worked with the non-profit organization Reverb since 2005 to promote environmental sustainability in the music industry. His efforts include traveling to Guatemala and Peru to advocate against illegal logging and for responsibly sourced wood in instrument manufacturing.

Valentine married yoga instructor Alexis Novak, founder of the vintage clothing company Tab Vintage on February 6, 2023. The couple have been in a relationship since at least 2018. Their marriage received congratulations from figures including John Mayer, Ryan Tedder, and model Behati Prinsloo, the wife of Valentine’s bandmate Adam Levine.

Outside of his work with Maroon 5, James Valentine has expressed an interest in pickleball. He began playing the sport while in Las Vegas for a band residency, having previously played tennis. He has described pickleball as appealing due to its social nature and the sense of “flow” experienced during play, and has participated in celebrity pickleball-related events.

== Discography ==
Other albums, on which Valentine has played

- Jenny Lewis with The Watson Twins – Rabbit Fur Coat (2006)
- John Mayer – Continuum (2006) (guitar on "Stop This Train" and "In Repair")
- Rilo Kiley – Under the Blacklight (2007)
- Rachael Yamagata – Elephants...Teeth Sinking into Heart (2008) (guitar on "Pause the Tragic Ending")
- Operation Aloha – Operation Aloha (2009)
- Janek Gwizdala – The Space in Between (2010) (guitar on "Bethany")
- Transmissor – Nacional (2011) (guitar on "Traz O Sol Pro Meu Lado Da Rua")
- PJ Morton – Following On My Mind (EP) (2012) and New Orleans (2013) (guitar on "Heavy"; also featuring Adam Levine)
- JJAMZ – Suicide Pact (2012)
- The Yellow River Boys – Urinal St. Station (2013) (various guitar solos)
- Screaming Headless Torsos – Code Red (2014) (guitar on "Brooce Swayne")
- Mike Posner – At Night, Alone (2016) (guitar on "One Hell of a Song")
- KT Tunstall – Wax (2018) (backing vocals on "The River")
- Rihwa – Wild Inside (2018) (guitar on "Sun Comes Up")

=== Filmography ===
==== Composer ====
- American Cancer Story (2024) (short film)

==== Songwriter ====
- The Starling (2021) – "Simple Sound of Morning" by Nate Ruess
- Daisy Jones & the Six (2023) – "Let Me Down Easy" by Riley Keough and Sam Claflin

==== Guitarist ====
- Regretting You (2025)
