= Jesse Carmichael =

American musician (born 1979)

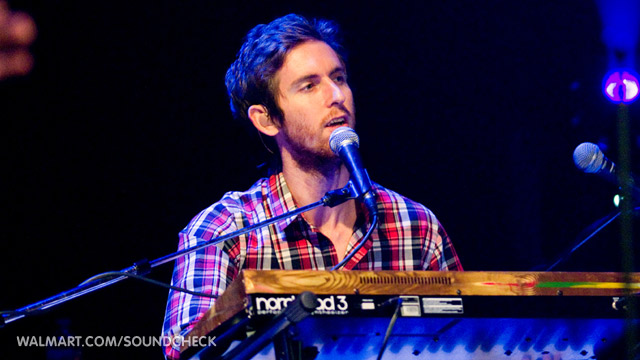
- Carmichael in 2010

Background information
- Born: Jesse Royal Carmichael; April 2, 1979 (age 46); Boulder, Colorado, U.S.
- Genres: Alternative rock; pop rock; funk rock; blue-eyed soul; experimental rock
- Occupation: Musician
- Instruments: Guitar; keyboards; vocals
- Years active: 1994–present
- Labels: J, A&M/Octone, 222, Interscope, Waxing Moon
- Member of: Maroon 5; 1863; Circuit Jerks
- Spouse: Tara Carmichael
- Website: circuitjerks.com

Jesse Royal Carmichael (born April 2, 1979) is an American musician, best known as the keyboardist and rhythm guitarist for the pop rock band Maroon 5. He is one of only two remaining original members of the group, along with frontman Adam Levine. He also has a solo project called 1863 and a side project titled Circuit Jerks.

== Biography ==
=== Early life and Kara's Flowers ===
Jesse Carmichael was born in Boulder, Colorado, United States. Carmichael first started playing piano at a young age, his father Bob getting him his own keyboard at age 7. The first songs he learned were Mozart and Bach tunes, with the two composers being some of his biggest influences even to this day. Carmichael began learning guitar in the seventh grade, after his older sister gifted him one for Christmas. At that point, his musical taste was largely influenced by Grunge.

Later that year, the Carmichael family would move, and Jesse would begin attending a new school, which would be Brentwood School in Los Angeles. It was there at Brentwood where he'd meet Adam Levine, Mickey Madden and Ryan Dusick. The three would introduce him to classic rock bands like The Beatles and The Kinks (although his father did show him Sgt. Pepper's Lonely Hearts Club Band). Not long after, the four would start a band called Kara's Flowers, and almost as fast would begin searching for a label to release their music. After self-releasing an album titled We Like Digging?, the band were signed to Reprise Records. In 1997, they released their debut studio album, The Fourth World. Although the group got the help of Rob Cavallo, the album flopped, and the band would soon be dropped from the label. After the failure of The Fourth World, the band would slow down. Carmichael and Levine would attended Five Towns College in Dix Hills, New York. While in college, Carmichael turned his sights back on the keyboards. After only a semester, the two would drop out and return to California, bringing with them new musical influences.

=== Maroon 5 ===
On March 9, 2012, Carmichael announced he would be taking a break from performing with Maroon 5 for an undetermined amount of time to focus more on his studies of "music and the healing arts". During his hiatus, the band's touring keyboardist, PJ Morton was promoted to an official member and took over Carmichael's keyboard duties to fill-in for his absence. However several months later, on October 10, 2012, Carmichael confirmed that he would be returning to the band after they completed their Overexposed World Tour, expanding the group's membership to six after Morton's promotion. He rejoined in time for the band to record their fifth studio album V (2014). After his return to the band, he began playing guitar in the band more often, in part due to him playing it more often during his hiatus, but also due to the addition of Morton and Sam Farrar.

== Personal life ==
On July 27, 2018, Carmichael's fiancé (now wife) Tara gave birth to their first son. On August 19, 2020, their second son was born.

Carmichael was Adam Levine's best man at his wedding in 2014.

Carmichael spends his time trying to learn more about music. He attended Santa Monica College from 2001 to 2002, and again in 2005. Nowadays, he visits numerous teachers for his piano and guitar playing, as well as his vocal performance, and also takes orchestration lessons.

=== Other ventures ===
In 2016, Carmichael joined with musician and producer Jason Lader and formed a side project titled Circuit Jerks. The group released an extended play titled EP1 on September 9, 2016. He also released a solo EP under the name "1863", which was chosen due to it being the year Abraham Lincoln signed the Emancipation Proclamation.

== Discography ==
=== Maroon 5 ===
Carmichael has featured on every Maroon 5 album release except for Overexposed (2012). Below are only the group's main albums.

- The Fourth World (1997) (as Kara's Flowers)
- Songs About Jane (2002)
- It Won't Be Soon Before Long (2007)
- Hands All Over (2010)
- V (2014)
- Red Pill Blues (2017)
- Jordi (2021)
- Love Is Like (2025)

=== As a featured artist ===
Title	Year	Album	Artist(s)
"Home"	2010	Ry Cuming	Ry Cuming

=== As a solo artist, 1863 ===
- EP Four Songs (2012)

=== Other projects ===
- Various Artists – Hoot: Original Motion Picture Soundtrack (2006)
- VietNam – VietNam (2007)
- Operation Aloha – Operation Aloha (2009)
- Brandi Carlile – Give Up the Ghost (2009)
- Ry Cuming - Ry Cuming (2010)
- Jesse Harris – Music for Chameleons (2017)
- Allan Clarke and Graham Nash with Adam Levine and Paul Shaffer – The Rock & Roll Hall of Fame: In Concert 2010 & 2011 (2018)
- Jesse Harris – Aquarelle (2018)
- Claire Rosinkranz – Beverly Hills Boyfriend (2020)
- Morly – Til I Start Speaking (2021)

=== Filmography ===
==== Composer ====
- Thrive (2019) (short film, also executive producer)
- Have You Heard About Greg? (2021) (co-composer with Chad Cannon and Timothy Williams)
