= Mickey Madden =

American bassist (born 1979)

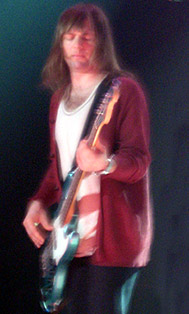
- Madden performing with Maroon 5 in 2007

Background information
- Also known as: Reggie Debris
- Born: Michael Allen Madden; May 13, 1979 (age 47); Austin, Texas, U.S.
- Genres: Alternative rock; funk rock; pop rock; blue-eyed soul; soft rock
- Occupation: Musician
- Instruments: Bass; vocals
- Years active: 1994–present
- Member of: Collapsing Scenery (as Reggie Debris)
- Formerly of: Maroon 5
- Spouse: Kate Bowman (m. 2025; sep. 2025)

Michael Allen Madden (born May 13, 1979) is an American musician and former bassist for the pop rock band Maroon 5.

== Life and music career ==
Madden was born in Austin, Texas. He began playing in junior high school at the Brentwood School in Los Angeles, playing in garages along with friends Jesse Carmichael (guitar/vocals) and Adam Levine (lead vocals/guitar). The bands Pearl Jam and Nirvana were among their influences. In 1994, with the addition of Ryan Dusick (drums), the band Kara's Flowers was formed.

After the hiatus of Kara's Flowers began, Madden attended classes at UCLA. After Madden attended college, the group rebranded with guitarist James Valentine joining the line-up, and Jesse Carmichael mainly playing the keyboards, and pursued a new musical direction, changing their name to Maroon, and later Maroon 5.

Until his departure from Maroon 5 on July 14, 2020, Madden was the only other member besides Adam Levine to remain in the band consistently.

Madden is also a founding member of a multimedia project called Collapsing Scenery, along with multi-instrumentalist Don Devore. Collaborated with actress and director Kansas Bowling who also directed the group's music videos including the 2022 film Cuddly Toys, which Madden appears in the film as the character Joe.

== Personal life ==
Madden was a dedicated vegan for ten years, and he supported the farmers and Farm Sanctuary. On May 6, 2025, Madden married fashion influencer Kate Bowman.

=== Legal issues ===
In 2016, Madden was arrested on drug possession charges alongside James Gubelmann, Ivanka Trump's ex-boyfriend, outside a bar in Manhattan. Madden accepted a day of community service in a plea deal.

On June 27, 2020, he was arrested on domestic violence charges. He announced his departure from Maroon 5 following his arrest. The Los Angeles District Attorney ultimately declined prosecution; the case was dropped, and no charges were filed.

On July 31, 2025, Madden's wife Kate Bowman was granted a domestic violence restraining order against him. According to court records, the restraining order was dismissed on November 17, 2025.

== Filmography ==
| Year | Title | Role | Notes |
|---|---|---|---|
| 1997 | Beverly Hills, 90210 | Himself / Performer (with Kara's Flowers) | Episode: "Forgive and Forget" |
| 2008 | CSI: NY | Himself / Performer (with Maroon 5) | Episode: "Page Turner" |
| 2018 | Sugar | Himself / Performer (with Maroon 5) | Episode: "Maroon 5 surprise a teen for the party of the year." |
| 2022 | Cuddly Toys | Joe | Feature film |

=== Music videos ===
| Year | Title | Artist(s) | Role | Notes | Ref. |
|---|---|---|---|---|---|
| 2018 | "Time Flies" | Z Berg | Dead Party Guest | Cameo | |

== Discography ==
=== As a featured artist ===
| Title | Year | Album | Artist(s) |
|---|---|---|---|
| "Daniela" (Remix) | 2019 | Non-album single | LEZ |

=== As a producer ===
- VietNam – VietNam (2007)
- The Icarus Line – Wildlife (2011)
- Giant Drag – Waking Up Is Hard to Do (2013)

Other albums, on which Madden has played

- Jenny Lewis with The Watson Twins – Rabbit Fur Coat (2006)
- The Tyde – Three's Co. (2006)
- VietNam – VietNam (2007)
- Rilo Kiley – Under the Blacklight (2007)
- Jenny Lewis – The Voyager (2014)
- Various Artists – Song One: Original Motion Picture Soundtrack (2015)
