= Maroon 5 discography =

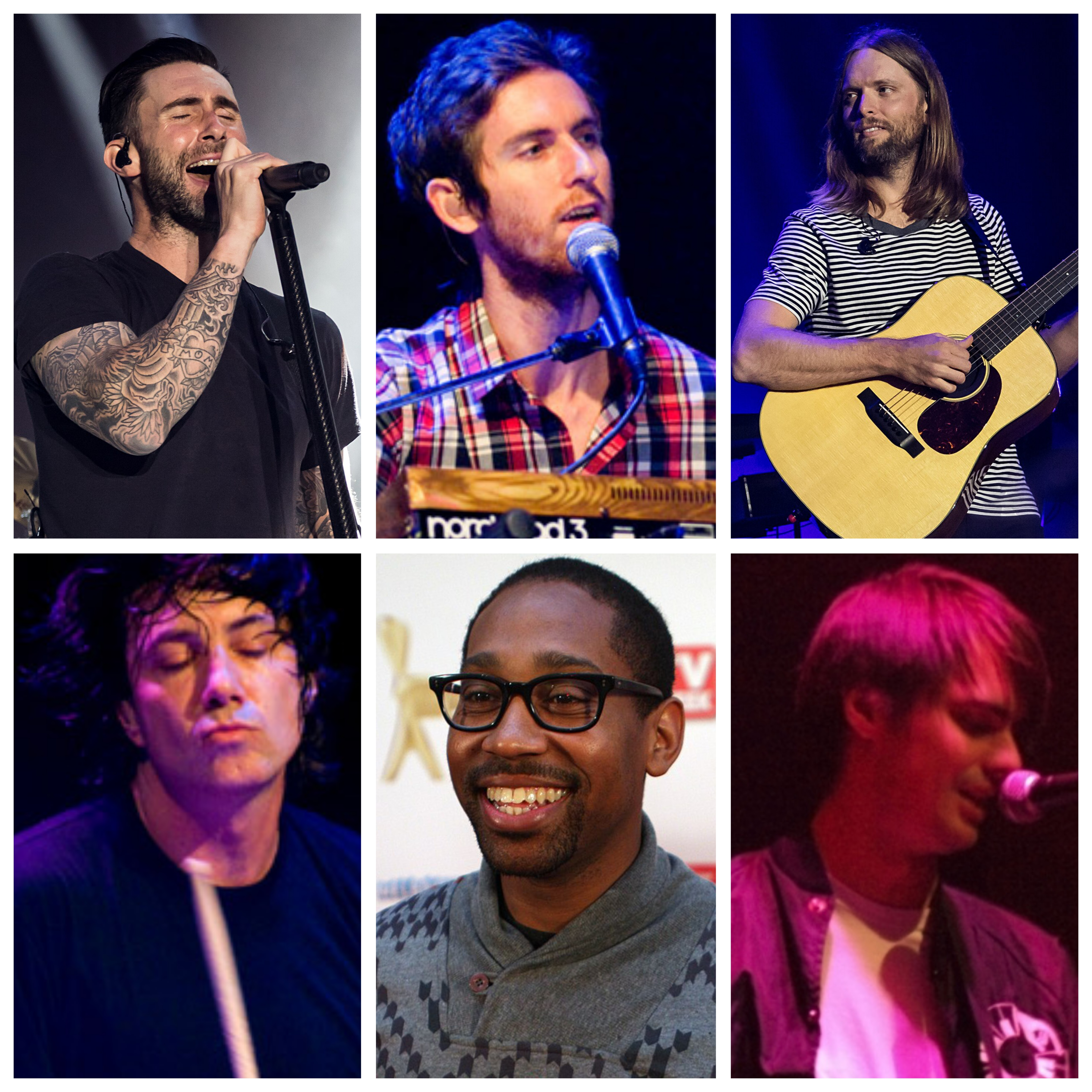
- Maroon 5 lineup since 2020
- Studio albums: 8
- Extended plays: 7
- Live albums: 3
- Compilation albums: 3
- Singles: 39
- Music videos: 48
- Demo Albums: 1
- Promotional singles: 10
- Remix albums: 1

American pop rock band Maroon 5 has released eight studio albums, three live albums, three compilation albums, one remix album, seven extended plays (EPs), 39 singles, 10 promotional singles, and 48 music videos. The group originally formed in 1994 as Kara's Flowers while they were still attending high school. With a line-up of Adam Levine, Jesse Carmichael, Mickey Madden and Ryan Dusick, they released their independent album, ...We Like Digging? in 1994. In 1997, they signed to Reprise Records and released an album, The Fourth World. After a tepid response to the album, the band parted with their record label and attended college. In 2001, the band regrouped and added James Valentine to the lineup, and pursued a new direction under the name Maroon 5.

Maroon 5 signed with Octone Records and recorded their debut album in 2002. The album Songs About Jane, was released in June 2002 and topped the charts in Australia, France, Ireland, New Zealand, and the United Kingdom. Its lead single "Harder to Breathe" received heavy airplay, which helped propel the album to number 6 on the US Billboard 200. The album's second and third singles, "This Love" and "She Will Be Loved", were worldwide hits in 2004. Five singles were released from the album. For the next few years, the band toured extensively worldwide in support of Songs About Jane and issued two live recordings: 1.22.03.Acoustic (2004) and Live – Friday the 13th (2005).

In 2006, drummer Ryan Dusick departed the band and was replaced by Matt Flynn and the revised band recorded their second album It Won't Be Soon Before Long in early 2007. The album was released in May and peaked at number 1 on the Billboard 200. Five singles were released from the album. The album's first single, "Makes Me Wonder", became the band's first number-one single on the US Billboard Hot 100. Hands All Over, the band's third studio album, was released in September 2010, peaking at number 2 on the Billboard 200. The album's lead single "Misery" was a top 15 hit on the Billboard Hot 100 while the album's fourth single, "Moves Like Jagger", became the band's second single to top the Hot 100. The band released their fourth studio album Overexposed in June 2012. The album peaked at number 2 on the Billboard 200. Its first two singles, "Payphone" and "One More Night", both peaked in the top two of the Billboard Hot 100 and became international hits. The latter single topped the Hot 100, giving the band their third number-one hit on the chart. The album's third single, "Daylight", became a top ten hit in the US and Canada, as well as peaking in the top forty of other multiple countries worldwide.

In September 2014, the fifth studio album V (pronounced: "five"), was released and topped the Billboard 200. The lead single "Maps" marked number six on the Hot 100, the second single "Animals" peaked at number three on the same chart, and the third single "Sugar", number two. In November 2017, the band released their sixth studio album Red Pill Blues and included the top ten singles "Don't Wanna Know" featuring Kendrick Lamar, and "What Lovers Do" featuring SZA. The remix version of "Girls Like You" featuring Cardi B reached number one on the Hot 100, giving the band their fourth number one single in the US.

== Albums ==
=== Studio albums ===
List of studio albums, with selected chart positions and certifications
Title	Album details	Peak chart positions										Sales	Certifications
Title	Album details	US	AUS	AUT	CAN	FRA	GER	ITA	NZ	SWI	UK	Sales	Certifications
The Fourth World (as Kara's Flowers)	Released: August 19, 1997 (US); Label: Reprise; Formats: CD, LP, cassette, digital download, streaming	—	—	—	—	—	—	—	—	—	—	US: 5,000	
Songs About Jane	Released: June 25, 2002 (US); Label: J, Octone; Formats: CD, LP, cassette, digital download, streaming	6	1	7	3	1	5	10	1	12	1	US: 5,149,000; UK: 2,019,827	RIAA: 4× Platinum; ARIA: 8× Platinum; BPI: 7× Platinum; BRMA: Gold; BVMI: Platinum; FIMI: Gold; IFPI AUT: Gold; IFPI SWI: Gold; MC: 3× Platinum; RMNZ: 6× Platinum; SNEP: 2× Gold
It Won't Be Soon Before Long	Released: May 22, 2007 (US); Label: A&M/Octone; Formats: CD, LP, cassette, digital download, streaming	1	5	14	2	13	6	4	2	6	1	US: 2,379,000; UK: 413,451	RIAA: 2× Platinum; ARIA: 2× Platinum; BPI: Platinum; BVMI: Gold; FIMI: Gold; IRMA: Gold; MC: Platinum; RMNZ: Gold
Hands All Over	Released: September 21, 2010 (US); Label: A&M/Octone; Formats: CD, LP, cassette, digital download, streaming	2	7	20	5	16	17	10	12	10	6	US: 1,383,000; UK: 313,034	RIAA: Platinum; ARIA: Platinum; BPI: Platinum; FIMI: Gold; MC: Platinum; SNEP: Gold
Overexposed	Released: June 26, 2012 (US); Label: A&M/Octone; Formats: CD, LP, cassette, digital download, streaming	2	4	7	3	5	4	3	3	7	2	US: 1,586,000; UK: 331,735	RIAA: Platinum; ARIA: Platinum; BPI: Platinum; BVMI: Gold; FIMI: Platinum; RMNZ: 2× Platinum; SNEP: Gold
V	Released: September 2, 2014 (US); Label: 222, Interscope; Formats: CD, LP, cassette, digital download, streaming	1	4	10	1	6	6	2	11	2	4	US: 1,000,000	RIAA: 3× Platinum; ARIA: Platinum; BPI: Platinum; BVMI: Gold; FIMI: Platinum; IFPI AUT: Platinum; MC: 3× Platinum; RMNZ: 3× Platinum; SNEP: Gold
Red Pill Blues	Released: November 3, 2017 (US); Label: 222, Interscope; Formats: CD, LP, cassette, digital download, streaming	2	7	31	2	24	44	15	6	21	12		RIAA: Platinum; ARIA: Platinum; BPI: Gold; FIMI: Platinum; IFPI AUT: Gold; MC: 2× Platinum; RMNZ: 4× Platinum; SNEP: Gold
Jordi	Released: June 11, 2021 (US); Label: 222, Interscope, Polydor; Formats: CD, LP, cassette, digital download, streaming	8	11	33	8	25	39	40	18	10	19		RIAA: Gold; FIMI: Gold; RMNZ: Platinum; SNEP: Gold
Love Is Like	Released: August 15, 2025 (US); Label: 222, Interscope; Formats: CD, LP, cassette, digital download, streaming	36	—	72	—	63	79	—	—	20	— (Note: Love Is Like did not enter the UK Albums Chart, but peaked at number 27 on the UK Albums Sales Chart.)		
"—" denotes a recording that did not chart or was not released in that territory.

=== Demo albums ===
Title	Album details
...We Like Digging?	Released: 1994; Label: Self-released; Formats: CD
Stagg Street Recordings	Released: 1999; Label: Self-released; Formats: CD

=== Live albums ===
List of live albums, with selected chart positions and certifications
Title	Album details	Peak chart positions						Certifications	Sales
Title	Album details	US	AUS	IRE	ITA	SWI	UK	Certifications	Sales
1.22.03.Acoustic	Released: June 29, 2004 (US); Label: Octone; Formats: CD, digital download	42	—	64	65	66	58	RIAA: Gold; BPI: Gold	US: 699,000
Live – Friday the 13th	Released: September 20, 2005 (US); Label: J, Octone; Formats: CD, digital download	61	37	—	—	—	—		US: 113,000
Live from Le Cabaret	Released: July 8, 2008 (US); Label: A&M/Octone; Formats: CD, digital download	117	—	—	—	—	—		US: 20,000
"—" denotes a recording that did not chart or was not released in that territory.

=== Compilation albums ===
List of compilation albums, with selected chart positions
Title	Album details	Peak chart positions							Certifications
Title	Album details	US	AUS	FRA	IRE	ITA	NZ	UK	Certifications
The B-Side Collection	Released: December 18, 2007 (US); Label: A&M/Octone; Formats: CD, digital download	51	—	—	—	—	—	—	
Singles	Released: September 25, 2015; Label: 222, Interscope; Formats: CD, LP, digital download	—	11	30	24	51	4	26	ARIA: 4× Platinum; BPI: 3× Platinum; RMNZ: Platinum
The Singles Collection	Released: November 26, 2025 (Japan); Label: 222, Interscope; Formats: CD, LP, digital download	—	—	—	—	—	—	—	

=== Remix albums ===
List of remix albums, with selected chart positions
Title	Album details	Peak chart positions	Sales
Title	Album details	US	Sales
Call and Response: The Remix Album	Released: December 9, 2008 (US); Label: A&M/Octone; Formats: CD, digital download	73	US: 136,000

== Extended plays ==
List of extended plays, with selected details, peak chart positions and sales
Title	Details	Peak chart positions	Sales
Title	Details	US Sales	Sales
Sessions@AOL	Released: June 2007; Label: A&M/Octone; Formats: CD, digital download	—	
Live from SoHo	Released: March 25, 2008 (US); Label: A&M/Octone; Formats: CD, digital download	—	
iTunes Session	Released: February 8, 2011 (US); Label: A&M/Octone; Format: Digital download	148	US: 10,000
12 Days	Released: November 26, 2012 (UK); Label: A&M/Octone; Format: Digital download	—	
Holiday Gift	Released: December 20, 2012 (UK); Label: A&M/Octone; Format: Digital download	—	
Will Be Loved	Released: February 7, 2025 (US); Label: 222, Interscope; Formats: Digital download, streaming	—	

== Singles ==
=== As lead artist ===
List of singles, with selected chart positions and certifications, showing year released and album name
Title	Year	Peak chart positions										Certifications	Album
Title	Year	US	AUS	AUT	CAN	FRA	GER	ITA	NZ	SWI	UK	Certifications	Album
"Soap Disco" (as Kara's Flowers)	1997	—	—	—	×	—	—	—	—	—	—		The Fourth World
"Harder to Breathe"	2002	18	37	—	×	—	79	28	33	—	13	RIAA: Platinum; ARIA: Platinum; BPI: Silver; RMNZ: Platinum	Songs About Jane
"This Love"	2004	5	8	3	×	6	5	3	4	4	3	RIAA: 2× Platinum; ARIA: 6× Platinum; BPI: 2× Platinum; BVMI: Gold; FIMI: Platinum; MC: Platinum; RMNZ: 5× Platinum	Songs About Jane
"She Will Be Loved"	2004	5	1	27	×	23	25	3	18	18	4	RIAA: 4× Platinum; ARIA: 9× Platinum; BPI: 4× Platinum; BVMI: Gold; FIMI: Platinum; MC: Platinum; RMNZ: 6× Platinum	Songs About Jane
"Sunday Morning"	2004	31	27	52	×	—	83	—	21	87	27	RIAA: 2× Platinum; ARIA: 3× Platinum; BPI: Platinum; FIMI: Gold; RMNZ: 4× Platinum	Songs About Jane
"Must Get Out"	2005	—	—	—	×	—	—	—	38	—	39		Songs About Jane
"Makes Me Wonder"	2007	1	6	12	1	40	11	3	8	14	2	RIAA: 3× Platinum; ARIA: 2× Platinum; BPI: Silver; MC: Platinum; RMNZ: Gold	It Won't Be Soon Before Long
"Wake Up Call"	2007	19	19	17	6	—	41	8	32	12	33	RIAA: 2× Platinum; ARIA: Platinum; MC: Platinum	It Won't Be Soon Before Long
"Won't Go Home Without You"	2007	48	7	16	16	—	11	14	20	65	44	RIAA: 2× Platinum; ARIA: 3× Platinum; MC: Gold; RMNZ: Platinum	It Won't Be Soon Before Long
"If I Never See Your Face Again" (featuring Rihanna)	2008	51	11	54	12	—	—	15	21	52	28	RIAA: Platinum; ARIA: Platinum; MC: Gold	It Won't Be Soon Before Long
"Goodnight Goodnight"	2008	—	—	—	—	—	—	—	—	—	—		It Won't Be Soon Before Long
"Misery"	2010	14	39	28	13	14	30	19	38	32	30	RIAA: 2× Platinum; ARIA: 2× Platinum; BPI: Silver; MC: Platinum; RMNZ: Platinum	Hands All Over
"Give a Little More"	2010	86	—	—	91	—	—	30	—	—	—		Hands All Over
"Never Gonna Leave This Bed"	2011	55	—	—	—	82	—	—	—	—	—	RIAA: Platinum	Hands All Over
"Moves like Jagger" (featuring Christina Aguilera)	2011	1	2	1	1	3	2	2	1	5	2	RIAA: Diamond; ARIA: 17× Platinum; BPI: 5× Platinum; BRMA: Platinum; BVMI: 5× Gold; FIMI: 2× Platinum; IFPI SWI: Platinum; MC: Diamond; RMNZ: 8× Platinum; SNEP: Gold	Hands All Over
"Payphone" (featuring Wiz Khalifa)	2012	2	2	5	1	8	4	1	2	4	1	RIAA: 7× Platinum; ARIA: 13× Platinum; BPI: 4× Platinum; BVMI: Platinum; FIMI: 3× Platinum; IFPI AUT: Gold; IFPI SWI: Platinum; MC: 5× Platinum; RMNZ: 6× Platinum	Overexposed
"One More Night"	2012	1	2	8	2	9	17	13	1	11	8	RIAA: 6× Platinum; ARIA: 9× Platinum; BPI: 2x Platinum; BVMI: Gold; FIMI: Platinum; IFPI SWI: Gold; MC: 6× Platinum; RMNZ: 4× Platinum	Overexposed
"Daylight"	2012	7	19	35	5	74	75	18	11	53	63	RIAA: 2× Platinum; ARIA: 2× Platinum; FIMI: Gold; MC: 2× Platinum; RMNZ: Platinum	Overexposed
"Love Somebody"	2013	10	—	—	10	87	—	—	34	—	—	RIAA: 2× Platinum; ARIA: Gold; MC: 2× Platinum; RMNZ: Platinum	Overexposed
"Maps"	2014	6	30	18	1	17	6	4	16	22	2	RIAA: 4× Platinum; ARIA: 5× Platinum; BPI: Platinum; BVMI: Platinum; FIMI: 2× Platinum; MC: 2× Platinum; RMNZ: 4× Platinum	V
"Animals"	2014	3	62	26	2	25	11	13	11	18	27	RIAA: Platinum; ARIA: 3× Platinum; BPI: 2× Platinum; BVMI: Platinum; FIMI: Platinum; MC: 2× Platinum; RMNZ: 3× Platinum	V
"Sugar"	2015	2	6	25	2	15	41	6	3	10	7	RIAA: Diamond; ARIA: 11× Platinum; BPI: 3× Platinum; Belgian Recorded Music Association|BRMA: Gold; BVMI: Gold; FIMI: 3× Platinum; MC: Platinum; RMNZ: 6× Platinum; SNEP: Gold	V
"This Summer's Gonna Hurt like a Motherfucker" (solo or Alesso remix)	2015	23	70	38	16	69	45	31	—	56	40	ARIA: Gold; RIAA: Platinum; FIMI: Gold	V
"Feelings"	2015	— (Note: "Feelings" did not enter the Billboard Hot 100, but peaked at number 8 on the Bubbling Under Hot 100 Singles chart.)	—	—	— (Note: "Feelings" did not enter the Canadian Hot 100, but did enter many subcharts, including peaking at number 48 on the Canada Adult Contemporary chart.)	—	—	—	—	—	—		V
"Don't Wanna Know" (featuring Kendrick Lamar) (Note: "Don't Wanna Know" and "Cold" are only included on both the deluxe and Japanese editions of Red Pill Blues.)	2016	6	6	18	6	20	33	4	4	14	5	RIAA: 2× Platinum; ARIA: 5× Platinum; BPI: Platinum; BRMA: Gold; BVMI: Gold; FIMI: 3× Platinum; RMNZ: 3× Platinum; SNEP: Gold; MC: 5× Platinum	Red Pill Blues
"Cold" (featuring Future)	2017	16	27	42	12	37	43	13	29	30	24	RIAA: Platinum; ARIA: 2× Platinum; BPI: Platinum; BVMI: Gold; FIMI: 2× Platinum; SNEP: Gold; MC: 3× Platinum; RMNZ: Platinum	Red Pill Blues
"What Lovers Do" (featuring SZA)	2017	9	7	11	6	17	17	5	6	9	12	RIAA: 2× Platinum; ARIA: 7× Platinum; BPI: Platinum; BRMA: Platinum; BVMI: Platinum; FIMI: 3× Platinum; RMNZ: 5× Platinum; SNEP: Platinum; MC: 4× Platinum	Red Pill Blues
"Wait"	2018	24	91	—	35	—	—	—	— (Note: "Wait" did not enter the NZ Top 40 Singles Chart, but peaked at number seven on the NZ Heatseeker Singles Chart.)	—	79	RIAA: 3× Platinum; ARIA: Platinum; MC: Platinum; RMNZ: Platinum	Red Pill Blues
"Girls Like You" (featuring Cardi B) (Note: The version of "Girls Like You" featuring Cardi B is only featured on the reissue of the Red Pill Blues deluxe edition.)	2018	1	2	8	1	1	9	5	1	4	7	RIAA: Diamond; ARIA: 13× Platinum; BPI: 3× Platinum; BRMA: Gold; BVMI: Platinum; FIMI: 3× Platinum; MC: 9× Platinum; RMNZ: 6× Platinum; SNEP: Diamond	Red Pill Blues
"Memories"	2019	2	2	10	2	13	20	10	3	3	5	RIAA: 4× Platinum; ARIA: 11× Platinum; BPI: 3× Platinum; BRMA: 2x Platinum; BVMI: Platinum; FIMI: 3× Platinum; IFPI AUT: Gold; MC: 4× Platinum; RMNZ: 7× Platinum; SNEP: Platinum	Jordi
"Nobody's Love"	2020	41	70	—	33	—	—	—	— (Note: "Nobody's Love" did not enter the NZ Top 40 Singles Chart, but peaked at number two on the NZ Hot Singles Chart.)	—	84	RIAA: Gold; ARIA: Gold; FIMI: Gold; MC: Gold; RMNZ: Gold	Jordi
"Beautiful Mistakes" (featuring Megan Thee Stallion)	2021	13	36	—	7	38	—	39	21	52	50	RIAA: Platinum; ARIA: 3× Platinum; BPI: Gold; MC: Platinum; FIMI: Platinum; IFPI SWI: Gold; RMNZ: 2× Platinum; SNEP: Diamond	Jordi
"Lost"	2021	— (Note: "Lost" did not enter the Billboard Hot 100, but peaked at number seven on the Bubbling Under Hot 100 Singles chart.)	88	—	69	—	—	—	— (Note: "Lost" did not enter the NZ Top 40 Singles Chart, but peaked at number six on the NZ Hot Singles Chart.)	—	—	ARIA: Gold; FIMI: Gold; RMNZ: Gold	Jordi
"Middle Ground"	2023	—	—	—	—	—	—	—	— (Note: "Middle Ground" did not enter the NZ Top 40 Singles Chart, but peaked at number 25 on the NZ Hot Singles Chart.)	—	—		Non-album single
"Priceless" (featuring Lisa)	2025	76	—	—	80	—	—	—	— (Note: "Priceless" did not enter the NZ Top 40 Singles Chart, but peaked at number 7 on the NZ Hot Singles Chart.)	—	69		Love Is Like
"All Night"	2025	—	—	—	—	—	—	—	—	—	—		Love Is Like
"California"	2025	—	—	—	—	—	—	—	—	—	—		Love Is Like
"Love Is Like" (featuring Lil Wayne)	2025	—	—	—	—	—	—	—	— (Note: "Love Is Like" did not enter the NZ Top 40 Singles Chart, but peaked at number 10 on the NZ Hot Singles Chart.)	—	—		Love Is Like
"Heroine"	2026	—	—	—	—	—	—	—	— (Note: "Heroine" did not enter the NZ Top 40 Singles Chart, but peaked at number 36 on the NZ Hot Singles Chart.)	—	—		Non-album single
"—" denotes a recording that did not chart or was not released in that territory.

=== Promotional singles ===
List of singles, showing year released and album name
Title	Year	Peak chart positions										Certifications	Album
Title	Year	US	AUS	CAN	FRA	GER	IRE	ITA	NZ Heat.	SWE	UK	Certifications	Album
"Happy Xmas (War is Over)" (Note: "Happy Xmas (War Is Over)", was originally released in December 2005, as part of Amnesty International's Make Some Noise campaign. A later version was released two years later in 2007.)	2005	—	—	—	—	—	—	—	—	—	—		Non-album single
"Until You're Over Me"	2007	—	—	—	—	—	—	—	—	—	—		The B-Sides Collection
"The Way You Look Tonight"	2009	—	—	—	—	—	—	—	—	—	—		His Way, Our Way
"Is Anybody Out There" (featuring PJ Morton)	2011	—	—	—	—	—	—	—	—	—	—		Non-album single
"Lucky Strike"	2014	— (Note: "Lucky Strike" did not enter the Billboard Hot 100, but peaked at number nine on the Bubbling Under Hot 100 Singles chart.)	—	—	—	—	—	—	—	—	—	RIAA: Gold	Overexposed
"It Was Always You"	2014	45	43	19	76	88	—	50	—	53	40	RIAA: Gold; FIMI: Gold	V
"Help Me Out" (with Julia Michaels)	2017	— (Note: "Help Me Out" did not enter the Billboard Hot 100, but peaked at number 18 on the Bubbling Under Hot 100 Singles chart.)	83	80	—	—	86	—	3	— (Note: "Help Me Out" did not enter the Swedish Singellista chart, but peaked at number eight on the Swedish Heatseeker chart.)	—		Red Pill Blues
"Whiskey" (featuring ASAP Rocky)	2017	—	—	—	—	—	—	—	7	— (Note: "Whiskey" did not enter the Swedish Singellista chart, but peaked at number 15 on the Swedish Heatseeker chart.)	—		Red Pill Blues
"Three Little Birds"	2018	—	—	—	—	—	—	—	—	—	—		Non-album single
"Lovesick"	2022	—	—	—	—	—	—	—	—	—	—		Jordi
"—" denotes a recording that did not chart or was not released in that territory.

== Other charted songs ==
List of songs, with selected chart positions, showing year released and album name
Title	Year	Peak chart positions							Album
Title	Year	US	US Dance	CAN	CZR	KOR	NZ Hot	SPA	Album
"Nothing Lasts Forever"	2007	— (Note: "Nothing Lasts Forever" did not enter the Billboard Hot 100, but peaked at number 23 on the Bubbling Under Hot 100 Singles chart.)	—	—	—	—	—	—	It Won't Be Soon Before Long
"Not Falling Apart" (Tiësto Remix)	2009	—	3	—	—	—	—	—	Call and Response: The Remix Album
"Stutter"	2010	84	—	—	—	—	—	—	Hands All Over
"Hands All Over"	2010	—	—	—	—	—	—	38	Hands All Over
"Out of Goodbyes" (featuring Lady Antebellum)	2010	— (Note: "Out of Goodbyes" did not enter the Billboard Hot 100, but peaked at number three on the Bubbling Under Hot 100 Singles chart.)	—	—	—	—	—	—	Hands All Over
"Come Away to the Water" (featuring Rozzi Crane)	2012	83	—	83	—	—	—	—	The Hunger Games: Songs from District 12 and Beyond
"Wipe Your Eyes"	2012	80	—	—	—	—	—	—	Overexposed
"Just a Feeling"	2014	—	—	—	—	3	—	—	Hands All Over
"Unkiss Me"	2014	—	—	56	—	—	—	—	V
"My Heart Is Open" (featuring Gwen Stefani)	2015	— (Note: "My Heart Is Open" did not enter the Billboard Hot 100, but peaked at number seven on the Bubbling Under Hot 100 Singles chart.)	—	94	—	—	—	—	V
"One Light (Remix)" (with Bantu featuring Yung Bleu and Latto)	2022	— (Note: "One Light (remix)" did not enter the Billboard Hot 100, but peaked at number 32 on the Billboard U.S. Afrobeats Songs chart.)	—	—	—	—	—	—	Non-album single
"Hideaway"	2025	—	—	—	—	—	40	—	Love Is Like
"Closer" (with Marshmello)	2025	—	—	—	9	—	—	—	Love Is Like
"—" denotes a recording that did not chart or was not released in that territory.

== Other appearances ==
List of other album appearances
Contribution	Year	Album
Kara's Flowers
"We Are the Champions"	1997	103.9 WYEG Presents Edgefest 97
"Yesterday When I Was Handsome"	1998	Hear You Me! A Tribute to Mykel and Carli
Maroon 5
"Woman"	2004	Music from and Inspired by Spider-Man 2
"Pure Imagination"	2004	Mary Had a Little Amp
"Everyday People" (Sly and the Family Stone featuring Maroon 5)	2005	Different Strokes by Different Folks
"She Will Be Loved" (Rhythms del Mundo featuring Maroon 5)	2006	Rhythms del Mundo: Cuba
"Lovely Day" (featuring Bill Withers and Kori Withers)	2006	Hoot: Original Motion Picture Soundtrack
"I Shall Be Released"	2012	Chimes of Freedom
"Happy"	2014	BBC Radio 1's Live Lounge 2014
