= Singles (Maroon 5 album) =

Greatest hits album by Maroon 5
- Released: September 25, 2015
- Recorded: 2001–2014
- Genres: Pop rock; pop
- Length: 43:44
- Labels: 222; Interscope; Polydor; Universal
- Producers: Matt Wallace; Mark Endert; Benny Blanco; Shellback; Robopop; Mike Elizondo; Mark "Spike" Stent; Sam Farrar; Max Martin; Noel Zancanella; Noah Passovoy; Maroon 5; Adam Levine; MdL; Ammo; Cirkut; Robert John "Mutt" Lange

Maroon 5 chronology
V (2014)	Singles (2015)	Red Pill Blues (2017)

Singles is the first greatest hits album by American pop rock band Maroon 5. It was released on September 25, 2015, through 222 and Interscope Records. The album includes 12 of the band's greatest hit singles released from their first five studio albums: Songs About Jane (2002), It Won't Be Soon Before Long (2007), Hands All Over (2010), Overexposed (2012), and V (2014).

Singles was released during the Maroon V Tour in Asia. The album does not contain any new or unreleased songs.

== Background ==
On September 1, 2015, Interscope Records announced that Maroon 5 would be releasing their debut greatest hits album, on their label. The track listing and album art cover were announced on the same day, revealing that there will be only 12 singles featured on the compilation album and will not contain any new or unreleased tracks. Some of their singles, such as "Harder to Breathe", "Sunday Morning" and "Won't Go Home Without You", were not included, though the latter two are included on the Japanese edition of the album.

== Album artwork ==
The album artwork for Singles was shot and edited by photographer and tourist Travis Schneider, also known as bootswallace on various social media websites, which was confirmed by Schneider via Twitter on September 6, 2015. The photo was taken whilst on tour with Maroon 5 on their North American leg of their world tour backstage.

== Critical reception ==
Professional ratings
Review scores
Source	Rating
AllMusic	4.5/5 stars

Writing for Contactmusic.com, Alex Lai stated: "For anyone who has forgotten or indeed not been familiar with the work of Adam Levine and company, this is a fine demonstration of their ability to blend genres".

Writing for Exepose, Georgia Seldis stated: This greatest hits album is almost a playlist of all of the Maroon 5 songs any casual fan would have on their iTunes, most of which we’ve all heard a million times on the radio.

Reviewer Pip Ellwood-Hughes wrote: Singles picks out 12 of the band’s greatest hits from their career so far. It’s not by any means a comprehensive celebration of the band’s hits and it features no new tracks on it either. In fact it doesn’t even feature the band’s summer hit This Summer’s Gonna Hurt Like a Motherfucker, which is a bit of a shame to be honest. The album opens with This Love, arguably one of the band’s biggest hits, and it includes classics such as She Will Be Loved, Payphone, Makes Me Wonder and Misery.

== Commercial performance ==
The album debuted at number six in Japan, selling 11,000 physical copies in its first week. In Brazil, the album debuted at number eight on the ABPD chart, selling 20,000 copies in its first week.

== Track listing ==
Singles – Standard edition
No.	Title	Writer(s)	Producer(s)	Length
1.	"This Love" (from Songs About Jane)	Adam Levine; Jesse Carmichael	Matt Wallace; Mark Endert	3:27
2.	"Payphone" (featuring Wiz Khalifa) (from Overexposed)	Levine; Benjamin Levin; Ammar Malik; Dan Omelio; Shellback; Cameron Thomaz	Benny Blanco; Shellback; Robopop^{[a]}	3:51
3.	"She Will Be Loved" (from Songs About Jane)	Levine; Valentine	Wallace	4:14
4.	"One More Night" (from Overexposed)	Levine; Shellback; Max Martin; Savan Kotecha	Shellback; Martin	3:39
5.	"Moves Like Jagger" (featuring Christina Aguilera) (from re-release of Hands All Over)	Levine; Levin; Malik; Shellback	Shellback; Blanco	3:21
6.	"Wake Up Call" (from It Won't Be Soon Before Long)	Levine; Valentine	Mike Elizondo; Mark "Spike" Stent; Sam Farrar; Endert	3:21
7.	"Misery" (from Hands All Over)	Levine; Carmichael; Farrar	Robert John "Mutt" Lange	3:36
8.	"Maps" (from V)	Levine; Mallik; Ryan Tedder; Levin; Noel Zancanella	Tedder; Blanco; Zancanella; Noah Passovoy	3:11
9.	"Makes Me Wonder" (from It Won't Be Soon Before Long)	Levine; Carmichael; Mickey Madden	Endert; Maroon 5	3:31
10.	"Animals" (from V)	Levine; Shellback; Levin	Shellback	3:51
11.	"Daylight" (from Overexposed)	Levine; M. Martin; Sam Martin; Mason Levy	Levine; MdL; Martin	3:46
12.	"Sugar" (from V)	Levine; Joshua Coleman; Lukasz Gottwald; Jacob Kasher Hindlin; Mike Posner; Henry Walter	Ammo; Cirkut	3:56
Total length:				43:44

Singles – Japan bonus tracks
No.	Title	Writer(s)	Producer(s)	Length
13.	"Sunday Morning" (from Songs About Jane)	Levine; Carmichael	Wallace	4:02
14.	"Won't Go Home Without You" (from It Won't Be Soon Before Long)	Levine	Elizondo; Stent; Maroon 5	3:51
Total length:				51:37

Singles – UK bonus track
No.	Title	Writer(s)	Producer(s)	Length
13.	"Feelings" (from V)	Levine; Shellback; Oscar Görres	Shellback, OzGo	3:13
Total length:				46:57

Notes

- ^{^a} signifies an additional producer

== Personnel ==
- Adam Levine – lead vocals, lead and rhythm guitar, songwriter, band member
- Jesse Carmichael – keyboards, backing vocals, rhythm guitar, songwriter, band member
- Mickey Madden – bass, songwriter, band member
- James Valentine – lead guitar, backing vocals, songwriter, band member
- Matt Flynn – drums, percussion, band member
- PJ Morton – keyboards, backing vocals, band member
- Ryan Dusick – drums, percussion (on tracks 1 and 3), band member (former)
- Sam Farrar – production, keyboards, programming, songwriter, band touring member
- Christina Aguilera – guest vocals (on track 5)
- Wiz Khalifa – guest vocals (on track 2)

== Charts ==
=== Weekly charts ===
Weekly chart performance for Singles
Chart (2015–2026)	Peak position
Australian Albums (ARIA)	11
Belgian Albums (Ultratop Wallonia)	64
Brazilian Albums (ABPD)	8
Canadian Albums (Billboard)	29
French Albums (SNEP)	30
Greek Albums (IFPI)	73
Irish Albums (Official Charts)	22
Italian Albums (FIMI)	51
Japan Hot Albums (Billboard Japan)	1
New Zealand Albums (RMNZ)	4
South Korean Albums (Circle)	16
UK Albums (Official Charts)	26

=== Year-end charts ===
Year-end chart performance for Singles
Chart	Year	Position
Japanese Albums (Billboard Japan)	2017	87
Australian Albums (ARIA)	2018	57
Australian Albums (ARIA)	2019	39
UK Albums (OCC)	2019	100
Australian Albums (ARIA)	2020	40
UK Albums (OCC)	2020	69
Australian Albums (ARIA)	2021	22
Irish Albums (IRMA)	2021	38
UK Albums (OCC)	2021	43
Australian Albums (ARIA)	2022	12
UK Albums (OCC)	2022	42
Australian Albums (ARIA)	2023	20
UK Albums (OCC)	2023	40
Australian Albums (ARIA)	2024	19
Canadian Albums (Billboard)	2024	99
UK Albums (OCC)	2024	35
Australian Albums (ARIA)	2025	24
UK Albums (OCC)	2025	42

== Certifications and sales ==
Certifications and sales for Singles
Region	Certification	Certified units/sales
Australia (ARIA)	4× Platinum	280,000^{‡}
Japan (RIAJ)	Gold	100,000^{^}
New Zealand (RMNZ)	Platinum	15,000^{‡}
United Kingdom (BPI)	3× Platinum	900,000^{‡}
^{^} Shipments figures based on certification alone.^{‡} Sales+streaming figures based on certification alone.

== Release history ==
Release history for Singles
Region	Date	Label	Ref.
Japan	September 25, 2015	222; Interscope	
United Kingdom	November 20, 2015	222; Interscope	
Europe	November 20, 2015	222; Interscope	
