= It Was Always You (disambiguation) =

"It Was Always You" is a 2014 song by Maroon 5.

It Was Always You may also refer to:

- "It Was Always You", song by Tanya Tucker, written Bob McDill from Ridin' Rainbows (1977)
- "It Was Always You, Helen", by Philip Glass from The Music of Candyman (1992)
