= Unkiss Me =

2014 song by Maroon 5

Song by Maroon 5

from the album V
- Released: August 28, 2014
- Recorded: 2013–2014
- Studio: MXM, Stockholm; Conway, Los Angeles
- Genre: Power ballad
- Length: 3:58
- Label: 222; Interscope
- Songwriters: Levine; Johan Carlsson; Ross Golan
- Producers: Johan Carlsson; Noah Passovoy

"Unkiss Me" is a song by American pop rock band Maroon 5. It is featured as the fourth track on band's fifth studio album, V (2014). Despite the song's popularity, it has never been performed live by the band.

== Composition ==
"Unkiss Me" starts off with a trap beat, which dissipates during the chorus in favor of a synth instrumental section. The entire song is more mid-tempo, along with the next track, "Sugar".

Lyrically, "Unkiss Me" is about a failed relationship, which Levine struggles to overcome. The song features Levine using his lower register in his voice more so than in other songs.

== Reception ==
"Unkiss Me" had a mostly positive reaction from critics, with some saying it was the best track on the album, although there were some more negative reviews. Brad Wete from Billboard nominated the song to be released as a single. It was noted as an album highlight by Jimmy Donnellin from Cultured Vultures. The song has been compared to Boyz II Men.

=== Chart performance and streaming ===
Due to the success of V, "Unkiss Me" (along with many other songs) charted due to strong sales numbers. It peaked at number 56 on the Canadian Hot 100 chart, and 15 on the South Korean Gaon Chart. The song has over 66 million streams on Spotify as of November 2022.

== Charts ==
Chart (2014)	Peak position
Canada (Canadian Hot 100)	56
South Korea International Chart (GAON)	15

== Personnel ==
Credits are adapted from AllMusic.

Maroon 5

- Adam Levine – lead and backing vocals, additional drums, songwriting
- Jesse Carmichael – keyboards, synthesizers, piano, backing vocals
- Mickey Madden – bass guitar
- James Valentine – lead guitar, backing vocals
- Matt Flynn – drums, percussion
- PJ Morton – keyboards, synthesizers, piano, backing vocals

Additional musicians

- Sam Farrar – backing vocals, programming
- Ross Golan – backing vocals, songwriting
- Johan Carlsson – songwriting, additional instrumentation, keyboards, mixing, production, programming, vocal production, backing vocals

Technical

this list may be incomplete list of credits

- Ryan Tedder – songwriting, production, additional instrumentation, programming
- John Armstrong – assistant
- Astma – additional instrumentation, production, programming
- Tim Blacksmith – executive production
- Max Martin – executive production, vocal production
- Noah "Mailbox" Passovoy – production
- Tom Coyne – mastering
- Danny D. – executive producer
- Eric Eylands – assistant
- Rachael Findlen – assistant
- Serban Ghenea – mixing
- Clint Gibbs – engineer
- John Hanes – mixing
- Seif "Mageef" Hussain – production coordination
