= This Summer's Gonna Hurt like a Motherfucker =

2015 song by American pop band Maroon 5

"This Summer's Gonna Hurt Like a Motherfucker"

Single by Maroon 5

from the album V (Deluxe Edition)
- Released: May 15, 2015
- Recorded: April 2015
- Studio: MXM Studios (Stockholm, Sweden); Conway Studios and Henson Studios (Los Angeles, California)
- Genre: Synth-pop; synth-rock
- Length: 3:44
- Label: 222; Interscope
- Songwriters: Adam Levine; Shellback
- Producer: Shellback

Maroon 5 singles chronology
"Sugar" (2015)	"This Summer's Gonna Hurt Like a Motherfucker" (2015)	"Feelings" (2015)

Music videos
- "This Summer Gonna's Hurt Like a Motherfucker" on YouTube "This Summer" (Clean) on YouTube

"This Summer's Gonna Hurt Like a Motherfucker" (also known as "This Summer's Gonna Hurt…" or titled/shortened to "This Summer" and censored as "This Summer's Gonna Hurt Like a Motherf***er" for its single release) is a song by the American rock band Maroon 5. As the fourth single from the band's fifth studio album V (2014), on May 15, 2015, it was included on the album's deluxe reissue version. Musically, the song has been described as having a "synthpop sound", while incorporating an arena rock style. Critical reception for the song was generally positive, with many critics appreciating the song as a fun live track and a catchy summer anthem, though some found it a bit generic or formulaic.

== Background ==
On May 5, 2015, it was rumored that Maroon 5 were to release a brand new single titled "This Summer's Gonna Hurt" on May 26, to radio airplay. The following day, it was confirmed by Billboard magazine in an article stating that "This Summer's Gonna Hurt" would be released ahead of the band's upcoming reissue deluxe of their album V (2014) and will follow the band's previous single "Sugar". On May 11, 2015, the band officially announced that the single would be released on May 15, and on mainstream radio May 19.

== Chart performance ==
During the May 17–23 tracking week, "This Summer's Gonna Hurt" received approximately 4,216 pop radio spins. That earned it the number 22 position on Mediabase's official pop radio airplay chart. The following week, "Summer" leveraged only two days of airplay to debut at number 35 on the official pop chart. "This Summer's Gonna Hurt" also reached the top 25 at hot adult contemporary radio. After debuting at number 44, the song jumped to number 23 on its second week, after receiving 1,457 tracking week spins. After peaking at number 23, the song became the band's first official single release in five years to miss the top 10 of the Billboard Hot 100.

== Music video ==
=== Background ===
The official music video for the song was filmed during a live concert at SSE Arena Wembley on May 28, 2015 and was shot in black-and-white. It was directed by Travis Schneider and Adam Levine. According to Schneider, the video was inspired by the music videos, "I Want Love" by Elton John and "Queer" by Garbage.

The video for the song was released without promo on May 30. In the video there is a scene where Levine's buttocks are fully exposed. Because of this in the video there is a content warning and the requirement that viewers sign in (to verify their age). It was eventually released on the band's YouTube channel on June 2, without the content. A clean version of the video was released on June 12, 2015. While most of the scene are retained from the original music video, the scenes about nudity, kissing and his mouth speaking profanity has been covered by different emojis, while the word "fucker" has been replaced by "AHA" instead of bleeping the sounds.

=== Synopsis ===
Adam Levine presented in a cloakroom when he's getting ready for the show.

The video starts with Adam Levine coming out of the bathroom and going to the cloakroom. After dressing up there, he starts to walk in the corridor. He takes to the stage where the audience greets him and the group performs the song live. When the performance ends the group members descend the stage and go to sit in their cars to go.

=== Reception ===
The music video was received with positive response from most critics. Daniel Kreps of Rolling Stone wrote humorously that the video is revealing for two reasons; "First, it offers a candid look at life on tour through the eyes of Adam Levine as the viewer journeys with the singer from the dressing room to backstage to the edge of the catwalk at a massive arena. Secondly, the video is revealing because Levine flashes some unexpected nudity". Vimal Esvaren of The Record Blog explained: "Another run-of-the-mill concert video, it is told from the perspective of frontman Levine as he leaves the shower, gets ready, goes on stage, performs and gets in a car out of the stadium with the rest of his bandmates. And in between all that he moons viewers for the extra shock factor".

=== Circuit Jerks video ===
A music video for the song's remix version performed by Circuit Jerks and created by Kidmograph. The video was released on July 31, 2015, by Samsung and later YouTube on January 25, 2016. The version also appeared on the group's EP titled EP1 (2016).

== Live performances ==
On May 19, 2015, Maroon 5 performed a clean version of the song during the finale of the eighth season of The Voice. Afterwards, the band also performed with the song as an encore for their worldwide concert tour, the Maroon V Tour.

== Track listing ==
CD Single

1. "This Summer's Gonna Hurt Like a Motherfucker" ― 3:44
2. "Sugar (Remix)" ― 3:55

Digital download

1. "This Summer's Gonna Hurt Like a Motherfucker" – 3:44

Digital download – Clean

1. "This Summer" (Clean) – 3:44

Digital download – Circuit Jerks Remix

1. "This Summer" (Circuit Jerks Remix) – 3:54

== Credits and personnel ==
All credits adapted from the liner notes.

Maroon 5

- Adam Levine – lead vocals, songwriting
- Jesse Carmichael – guitar, gang vocals
- Mickey Madden – bass
- James Valentine – guitar, gang vocals
- Matt Flynn – drums, percussion
- PJ Morton – keyboards, gang vocals

Session musicians

- Shellback – songwriting, producer, programming, additional guitar, bass, keyboards, gang vocals
- Sam Farrar – gang vocals

Additional personal

- Noah "Mailbox" Passovoy – engineer
- Sam Holland – assistant engineer
- Corey Bice – assistant engineer
- Emerson Day – assistant engineer
- Ben Sedano – assistant engineer
- Serban Ghenea – mixer
- John Hanes – engineered for mix
- Tim Roberts – assistant engineered for mix
- Tom Coyne – mastering

Recording

- Recorded at: MXM Studios, Stockholm, Sweden, and at Conway Studios and Henson Studios, Los Angeles, California
- Mixed by at MixStar Studios, Virginia Beach, Virginia, United States
- Mastered at Sterling Sound, New York City, New York, United States

== Charts ==
=== Weekly charts ===
Weekly chart performance
Chart (2015)	Peak position
Australia (ARIA)	70
Austria (Ö3 Austria Top 40)	38
Belgium (Ultratip Bubbling Under Flanders)	2
Belgium (Ultratip Bubbling Under Wallonia)	3
Bulgaria (IFPI)	4
Canada Hot 100 (Billboard)	16
Canada AC (Billboard)	28
Canada CHR/Top 40 (Billboard)	11
Canada Hot AC (Billboard)	16
CIS Airplay (TopHit)	4
Czech Republic Airplay (ČNS IFPI)	39
Czech Republic Singles Digital (ČNS IFPI)	21
Denmark (Tracklisten)	40
Finland (Suomen virallinen lista)	16
Finland Airplay (Radiosoittolista)	1
France (SNEP)	69
Germany (GfK)	45
Hungary (Rádiós Top 40)	36
Hungary (Single Top 40)	30
Hungary (Stream Top 40)	22
Ireland (IRMA)	46
Italy (FIMI)	31
Italian Airplay (EarOne)	7
Lebanon (OLT 20)	6
Lebanon English (OLT 20)	3
Mexico Ingles Airplay (Billboard)	1
Netherlands (Dutch Top 40)	30
Netherlands (Single Top 100)	39
Norway (VG-lista)	37
Poland Airplay (ZPAV)	16
Russia Airplay (TopHit)	7
Scottish Singles Sales (Official Charts)	13
Slovakia Airplay (ČNS IFPI)	55
Slovakia Singles Digital (ČNS IFPI)	22
Slovenia (SloTop50)	36
South Korea International Chart (Gaon)	38
Sweden (Sverigetopplistan)	52
Switzerland (Schweizer Hitparade)	56
UK Singles (Official Charts)	40
Ukraine Airplay (TopHit)	10
US Billboard Hot 100	23
US Adult Contemporary (Billboard)	21
US Adult Pop Airplay (Billboard)	7
US Dance Airplay (Billboard)	19
US Pop Airplay (Billboard)	10
Venezuela Pop General (Record Report)	19
Venezuela Pop Rock General (Record Report)	5
Venezuela Top Anglo (Record Report)	6

=== Year-end charts ===
Annual chart rankings
Chart (2015)	Position
Canada (Canadian Hot 100)	84
CIS (Tophit)	49
Russia Airplay (Tophit)	53
Ukraine Airplay (Tophit)	60
US Adult Top 40 (Billboard)	44

== Certifications ==
Region	Certification	Certified units/sales
Brazil (Pro-Música Brasil)	Platinum	60,000^{‡}
Denmark (IFPI Danmark)	Gold	45,000^{‡}
Italy (FIMI)	Gold	25,000^{‡}
Poland (ZPAV)	Platinum	20,000^{*}
United States (RIAA)	Platinum	1,000,000^{‡}
^{*} Sales figures based on certification alone.^{‡} Sales+streaming figures based on certification alone.

== Release history ==
Region	Date	Format	Version	Label(s)	Ref.
Various	May 15, 2015	Digital download	Original; clean	222; Interscope	
United States	May 19, 2015	Contemporary hit radio	Clean	222; Interscope	
Germany	July 31, 2015	CD	Original; "Sugar" Remix featuring Nicki Minaj	222; Interscope	
Various	September 9, 2016	Digital download	Circuit Jerks Remix	222; Interscope	

== Maroon 5 vs. Alesso version ==
"This Summer (Maroon 5 vs. Alesso)"

Single by Maroon 5 vs. Alesso
- Released: June 29, 2015
- Recorded: June 2015
- Genre: Progressive house
- Length: 3:11
- Label: 222; Interscope
- Songwriters: Adam Levine; Shellback
- Producers: Shellback; Alesso

Alesso singles chronology
"Sweet Escape" (2015)	"This Summer (Maroon 5 vs. Alesso)" (2015)	"Anthem" (2016)

Audio video
- This Summer (Maroon 5 vs. Alesso) on YouTube

A progressive house version of the song remixed by Swedish producer Alesso, was released on June 29, 2015 on iTunes. The version which was credited as Maroon 5 vs. Alesso.

=== Background ===
Alesso explained:

I heard this record and I had to do a version. It's just one of those records you have to turn up so loud it hurts. It's the record of the summer for me!” It looks like Maroon 5 felt the same way about working with the “Heroes (We Could Be)” hitmaker.

Adam Levine also explained about the collaboration of Alesso:

“We are big fans of Alesso's and were thrilled to hear that he would do a remix of the song. We are both friends with [producer] Shellback and have mutual respect for each other so it was cool to be able to collaborate on something together like this.”

=== Live performances ===
On June 20, 2015, Alesso debut the version for the first time at EDC festival in Las Vegas, Nevada. On July 24, 2015, Alesso performed the remix at the Tomorrowland festival in Boom, Belgium.

=== Track listing ===
- Digital download
1. "This Summer" (Maroon 5 vs. Alesso) – 3:11
2. "This Summer" (Maroon 5 vs. Alesso) (Extended Mix) - 5:04
- Digital download — Clean
1. "This Summer" (Maroon 5 vs. Alesso) (Clean) – 3:11

=== Certifications ===
Certifications for "This Summer"
Region	Certification	Certified units/sales
Australia (ARIA)	Gold	35,000^{‡}
^{‡} Sales+streaming figures based on certification alone.

=== Release history ===
Region	Date	Format	Version	Label(s)	Ref.
Various	June 29, 2015	Digital download	Original; clean	222; Interscope	
