= It Was Always You =

Promotional single by Maroon 5

from the album V
- Released: July 29, 2014
- Recorded: 2013–2014; Conway Studios (Los Angeles, California)
- Genre: Electro-rock
- Length: 4:00
- Label: 222; Interscope
- Songwriters: Adam Levine; Sam Martin; Jason Evigan; Marcus Lomax; Jordan Johnson; Stefan Johnson
- Producers: Jason Evigan; The Monsters and the Strangerz

Maroon 5 promotional singles chronology
"Lucky Strike" (2014)	"It Was Always You" (2014)	"Help Me Out" (2017)

"It Was Always You" is a song by American band Maroon 5. It was released through 222 and Interscope Records on July 29, 2014, as the first and only promotional single from their fifth studio album V (2014). Critical reception for the song was mixed to positive, with reviewers noting its upbeat electropop sound and a departure from the band's rock roots, though some critics found the song to be a bit generic.

== Composition and recording ==
"It Was Always You" was written by Maroon 5's lead singer Adam Levine, Sam Martin, Jason Evigan, Marcus Lomax, Jordan Johnson and Stefan Johnson. It was produced by Jason Evigan and The Monsters and the Strangerz. The upbeat ballad, lyrically about friends becoming lovers, features Levine singing such lyrics as: "Woke up sweating from a dream / With a different kind of feeling", "Hazel eyes, I was so color blind", "It was always you / Can't believe I could not see it all this time, all this time", "Now I know why my heart wasn't satisfied, satisfied" and "All my hidden desires finally came alive" in his signature falsetto, belted over synthesizers. E! Online's Chima Simone noted that these lyrics might refer to Levine's wife Behati Prinsloo. "Sometimes what you’re looking for is right in front of you," MTV News' Christina Garibaldi noted as the song's central message. Levine is joined on the song by fellow Maroon 5 members: keyboardist and rhythm guitarist Jesse Carmichael (who did not perform on the band's 2012 album Overexposed), drummer Matt Flynn, bassist Mickey Madden, keyboardist PJ Morton and lead guitarist James Valentine.

In a departure from the band's usual pop rock songs and their previous pop-leaning single "Maps", "It Was Always You" incorporates electronic synthesizers (opening with "jittery synths", according to Idolator's Mike Wass) and is an electropop song. Its sound has been compared to 1980s music. While noted as a different musical style for the band, Wass described it as "unmistakably Maroon 5". Carolyn Menyes from Music Times explained: "This song takes the band's new poppy direction and makes it dark, with yearning vocals and deep twists".

== Live performances ==
On August 26, 2014, Maroon 5 performed "It Was Always You" for the first time at the iHeartRadio Theater in Burbank, California. On August 30, 2014, the song was performed on ESPN Saturday Night Football, with the accompanying performance video being released the same day.

The band also performing with the track live on The Today Show at Rockefeller Plaza in New York, on September 1 and the 2014 iTunes Festival at the Roundhouse in London on September 11, respectively.

The track has been performed 48 known times by the band.

== Charts ==
=== Weekly charts ===
Chart (2014)	Peak position
Australia (ARIA)	43
Canada (Canadian Hot 100)	19
Czech Republic (Singles Digitál Top 100)	39
Europe (Euro Digital Songs)	35
France (SNEP)	76
Germany (GfK)	88
Italy (FIMI)	50
Portugal (Billboard)	34
Scotland Singles (OCC)	19
Slovakia (Singles Digitál Top 100)	38
South Korea (GAON)	65
South Korea International Chart (GAON)	2
Spain (PROMUSICAE)	32
Sweden (Sverigetopplistan)	53
UK Singles (OCC)	40
US Billboard Hot 100	45

=== Year-end charts ===
Chart (2014)	Position
South Korea International Chart (Gaon)	62

== Certifications ==
Region	Certification	Certified units/sales
Italy (FIMI)	Gold	25,000^{‡}
United States (RIAA)	Gold	500,000^{‡}
^{‡} Sales+streaming figures based on certification alone.

== Release history ==
Region	Date	Format	Label(s)	Ref.
Australia	July 29, 2014	Digital download	222; Interscope	
France	July 29, 2014	Digital download	222; Interscope	
United Kingdom	July 29, 2014	Digital download	222; Interscope	
United States	July 29, 2014	Digital download	222; Interscope	
