= Maroon V Tour =

Concert tour by Maroon 5 (2015-2018)

- Tour by Maroon 5
- Promotional poster for the tour
- Location: North America; Europe; Asia; Oceania; Africa; Latin America
- Associated album: V
- Start date: February 16, 2015
- End date: May 12, 2018
- Legs: 16
- No. of shows: 137

Maroon 5 concert chronology
- Overexposed Tour (2012–2014); Maroon V Tour (2015–2018); Red Pill Blues Tour (2018–2019)

The Maroon V Tour (also known as M5 On the Road Tour) was the tenth headlining concert tour by American band Maroon 5 in support of their fifth studio album V (2014) (pronounced: "five"). The tour began on February 16, 2015, in Dallas and concluded on May 12, 2018, in Zapopan, Mexico, comprising 137 concerts.

== Background and development ==
The tour was announced in May 2014. The band stated that, through a contract with Live Nation, they are set to embark on a world tour in late 2014 through to early 2015 in support of the new album. In June, the band posted a photo on their official Instagram account asking fans where they should perform "with a tour coming soon". Also through Instagram, in August the band revealed with a series of photos the states where they will bring the tour. All the dates for North America and Europe were announced on September 2, 2014, and due to the high demand, second shows as well as brand new dates were later announced by the band. During 2015, Maroon 5 announced shows in Asia, Oceania, Mexico and South America, as well as a second leg in North America which is scheduled to take place in cities where they have not performed during the first. In early 2016, new European shows were added. In September 2016, Maroon 5 confirmed the seven dates of the North American leg from September and October 2016, was postponed until February and March 2017.

== Opening acts ==
=== 2015 ===
- Magic! (North America and Europe)
- Rozzi Crane (North America)
- Nick Jonas (North America)
- Matt McAndrew (North America)
- Phases (North America)
- We Are I.V (Europe)
- Nick Gardner (Europe)
- Mike Watson (Europe)
- Ghita (Africa)
- Dirty Loops (Asia and Oceania)
- Conrad Sewell (Australia)

=== 2016 ===
- Rey Pila (Mexico)
- The Mills (Colombia)
- Foxley (Argentina)
- Dashboard Confessional (Brazil)
- Dingo Bells (Brazil)
- Elle King (North America)
- Tove Lo (North America)
- Phases (North America)
- R. City (North America)
- Best Coast (North America)
- Léon (North America)
- Amy Pham (North America)
- Jasmine Solano (North America)
- PJ Morton (North America)
- Polly A (North America)

=== 2017 ===
- R. City (North America)
- Tinashe (North America)
- The Roots (North America)
- The Revivalists (North America)
- Incubus (Peru)

=== 2018 ===
- De La Rut (Guatemala)

== Setlist ==
This set list is representative of the show in Kansas City on March 21, 2015. It is not representative of all concerts for the duration of the tour.

1. "Animals"
2. "One More Night" (contains elements of "Monster")
3. "Stereo Hearts" (Gym Class Heroes cover)
4. "Harder to Breathe"
5. "Lucky Strike"
6. "Wake Up Call"
7. "Love Somebody"
8. "Maps"
9. "This Love"
10. "Sunday Morning"
11. "Makes Me Wonder"
12. "Payphone"
13. "Daylight"
14. "It Was Always You"
15. "She Will Be Loved"
16. "Moves Like Jagger"
17. "Sugar"
18. "This Summer" (recorded music video on May 28)
Notes
- During the show in Anaheim, California, on April 6, 2015, The Lonely Island member and actor Andy Samberg makes appearance to the audience, right after the performance by Magic!, before introducing to Maroon 5 in the show.
- During the Australian leg of the tour from September 26 and October 4, 2015. Maroon 5 and R. City who makes an appearance to perform the song "Locked Away", in which Adam Levine appeared as the song's featured artist. R. City later joined the band during the tour's North American leg between 2016 and 2017, respectively.
- During the show in Rio de Janeiro, Brazil on March 20, 2016, Levine performed "Garota de Ipanema (The Girl from Ipanema)", singing the first verse in portuguese and the rest in English.
Special guests

The band performed duets with musical guests on most dates of the tour.

- April 4, 2015 – Inglewood: "I Love L.A." with Randy Newman featuring a performance by the Laker Girls.
Tribute song
- During the show in Orlando, Florida, Adam Levine performed "She Will Be Loved", dedicated to the late Christina Grimmie. Also, Maroon 5 performed "Let's Go Crazy", dedicated to musician Prince.

== Shows ==
List of concerts, showing date, city, country, venue, opening acts, tickets sold, number of available tickets and amount of gross revenue
Date	City	Country	Venue	Opening acts	Attendance	Revenue
2015
Leg 1 — North America
February 16	Dallas	United States	American Airlines Center	Magic! Rozzi Crane	14,879 / 14,879	$1,296,614
February 17	Houston	United States	Toyota Center	Magic! Rozzi Crane	12,554 / 12,554	$1,246,700
February 19	Atlanta	United States	Philips Arena	Magic! Rozzi Crane	14,620 / 14,620	$1,296,760
February 24	Sunrise	United States	BB&T Center	Magic! Rozzi Crane	14,641 / 14,641	$1,301,007
February 25	Tampa	United States	Amalie Arena	Magic! Rozzi Crane	15,031 / 15,031	$1,034,559
February 27	Nashville	United States	Bridgestone Arena	Magic! Rozzi Crane	16,574 / 16,574	$1,378,733
February 28	Indianapolis	United States	Bankers Life Fieldhouse	Magic! Rozzi Crane	14,539 / 14,539	$1,300,855
March 2	Washington, D.C.	United States	Verizon Center	Magic! Rozzi Crane	15,183 / 15,183	$1,487,083
March 3	Boston	United States	TD Garden	Magic! Rozzi Crane	14,662 / 14,662	$1,368,256
March 5	New York City	United States	Madison Square Garden	Magic! Rozzi Crane	29,998 / 29,998	$2,852,671
March 6	New York City	United States	Madison Square Garden	Magic! Rozzi Crane	29,998 / 29,998	$2,852,671
March 8	East Rutherford	United States	Izod Center	Magic! Rozzi Crane	16,624 / 16,624	$1,565,026
March 9	Philadelphia	United States	Wells Fargo Center	Magic! Rozzi Crane	16,204 / 16,204	$1,602,385
March 11	Columbus	United States	Nationwide Arena	Magic! Rozzi Crane	15,264 / 15,264	$1,387,961
March 13	Pittsburgh	United States	Consol Energy Center	Magic!	15,546 / 15,546	$1,355,901
March 14	Louisville	United States	KFC Yum! Center	Magic! Rozzi Crane	17,645 / 17,645	$1,484,359
March 16	Toronto	Canada	Air Canada Centre	Magic! Rozzi Crane	16,696 / 16,696	$1,629,143
March 18	Auburn Hills	United States	The Palace of Auburn Hills	Magic! Rozzi Crane	15,649 / 15,649	$1,428,899
March 19	Chicago	United States	United Center	Magic! Rozzi Crane	16,067 / 16,067	$1,479,650
March 21	Kansas City	United States	Sprint Center	Magic! Rozzi Crane	15,086 / 15,086	$1,482,154
March 23	St. Paul	United States	Xcel Energy Center	Magic! Rozzi Crane	15,502 / 15,502	$1,520,497
March 25	Saskatoon	Canada	SaskTel Centre	Magic! Rozzi Crane	12,560 / 12,560	$942,790
March 26	Edmonton	Canada	Rexall Place	Magic! Rozzi Crane	13,950 / 13,950	$1,234,308
March 28	Tacoma	United States	Tacoma Dome	Magic! Rozzi Crane	19,835 / 19,835	$1,522,061
March 29	Vancouver	Canada	Rogers Arena	Magic! Rozzi Crane	15,235 / 15,235	$1,275,236
March 31	San Jose	United States	SAP Center	Magic! Rozzi Crane	14,992 / 14,992	$1,304,360
April 1	San Diego	United States	Viejas Arena	Magic! Rozzi Crane	9,668 / 11,000	$896,360
April 3	Inglewood	United States	The Forum	Magic! Rozzi Crane	26,876 / 34,000	$2,389,694
April 4	Inglewood	United States	The Forum	Magic! Rozzi Crane	26,876 / 34,000	$2,389,694
April 6	Anaheim	United States	Honda Center	Magic! Rozzi Crane	12,091 / 12,091	$824,345
Leg 2 — Europe
May 24	Paris	France	Zénith Paris	We Are I.V	5,988 / 5,988	$421,809
May 26	London	England	The SSE Arena Wembley	Magic! Nick Gardner; Mike Watson	19,180 / 19,666	$1,389,567
May 28	London	England	The SSE Arena Wembley	Magic! Nick Gardner; Mike Watson	19,180 / 19,666	$1,389,567
May 31	Birmingham	England	Genting Arena	Magic! Nick Gardner; Mike Watson	13,358 / 13,640	$871,586
June 1	Manchester	England	Manchester Arena	Magic! Nick Gardner; Mike Watson	13,764 / 15,000	$868,271
June 3	Amsterdam	Netherlands	Ziggo Dome	Magic! Nick Gardner; Mike Watson	15,731 / 16,000	$817,151
Leg 3 — Africa
June 6 (Note: The June 6, 2015 concert in Rabat, Morocco at OLM Souissi is part of Mawazine Festival 2015.)	Rabat	Morocco	OLM Souissi	Ghita	—N/a	—N/a
Leg 4 — Europe
June 9	Oberhausen	Germany	König Pilsener Arena	Magic! Nick Gardner; Mike Watson	10,331 / 10,331	$507,153
June 10	Munich	Germany	Olympiahalle	Magic! Nick Gardner; Mike Watson	11,601 / 11,601	$558,812
June 12	Milan	Italy	Mediolanum Forum	Magic! Nick Gardner; Mike Watson	10,826 / 10,826	$472,286
June 14	Barcelona	Spain	Palau Sant Jordi	Magic! Nick Gardner; Mike Watson	16,550 / 16,550	$895,401
June 15	Madrid	Spain	Barclaycard Center	Magic! Nick Gardner; Mike Watson	14,088 / 14,088	$854,642
June 17	Lisbon	Portugal	MEO Arena	Magic! Nick Gardner; Mike Watson	17,913 / 17,913	$964,155
Leg 5 — North America
August 15	Hershey	United States	Hersheypark Stadium	Nick Jonas; Matt McAndrew	26,857 / 28,282	$1,694,801
August 16	Atlantic City	United States	Atlantic City Beach	Nick Jonas; Matt McAndrew	37,418 / 55,000	$1,572,769
Leg 6 — Asia
September 2	Yokohama	Japan	Yokohama Arena	Dirty Loops	12,478 / 12,478	$1,303,079
September 4	Hong Kong		AsiaWorld–Arena	Dirty Loops	14,038 / 14,038	$1,531,595
September 7	Seoul	South Korea	Olympic Gymnastics Arena	Dirty Loops	26,518 / 26,518	$2,653,948
September 9	Seoul	South Korea	Olympic Gymnastics Arena	Dirty Loops	26,518 / 26,518	$2,653,948
September 10 (Note: The September 10, 2015 show was originally scheduled to take place on September 6, 2015 but was delayed.)	Daegu	South Korea	Daegu Sub Stadium	Dirty Loops	10,536 / 12,538	$1,061,578
September 14	Taipei	Taiwan	Nangang Exhibition Hall	Dirty Loops	38,996 / 38,996	$3,607,637
September 15	Taipei	Taiwan	Nangang Exhibition Hall	Dirty Loops	38,996 / 38,996	$3,607,637
September 17	Pasay	Philippines	Mall of Asia Arena	Dirty Loops	11,401 / 11,401	$1,703,200
September 19 (Note: The September 19, 2015, concert in Singapore is part of the 2015 Formula One Singapore Grand Prix Concert Series.)	Singapore		Marina Bay Street Circuit	—N/a	—N/a	—N/a
September 21	Bangkok	Thailand	Impact Arena	Dirty Loops	21,506 / 21,506	$2,039,541
September 22	Bangkok	Thailand	Impact Arena	Dirty Loops	21,506 / 21,506	$2,039,541
Leg 7 — Oceania
September 26	Melbourne	Australia	Rod Laver Arena	Dirty Loops; Conrad Sewell	14,089 / 14,089	$1,093,930
September 28	Brisbane	Australia	Brisbane Entertainment Centre	Dirty Loops; Conrad Sewell	11,142 / 11,142	$812,830
September 29	Sydney	Australia	Allphones Arena	Dirty Loops; Conrad Sewell	16,479 / 16,479	$1,254,595
October 1	Christchurch	New Zealand	Horncastle Arena	Dirty Loops	8,761 / 8,761	$570,558
October 3	Auckland	New Zealand	Vector Arena	Dirty Loops	23,773 / 23,773	$1,687,279
October 4	Auckland	New Zealand	Vector Arena	Dirty Loops	23,773 / 23,773	$1,687,279
Leg 8 — North America
October 24 (Note: The concert on October 24, 2015 in Los Angeles was part of the We Can Survive benefit concert.)	Los Angeles	United States	Hollywood Bowl	—N/a	—N/a	—N/a
December 30 (Note: The concerts on December 30 and 31, 2015, in Las Vegas is part of the New Year's Eve 2016 Festival.)	Las Vegas	United States	Mandalay Bay Events Center	Phases	—N/a	—N/a
December 31	Las Vegas	United States	Mandalay Bay Events Center	Phases	—N/a	—N/a
2016
Leg 9 — Latin America
February 25	Guadalajara	Mexico	Arena VFG	Rey Pila	11,494 / 11,494	$872,531
February 26	Monterrey	Mexico	Auditorio Banamex	Rey Pila	6,811 / 6,811	$746,369
February 29	Mexico City	Mexico	Foro Sol	Rey Pila	117,296 / 117,946	$6,344,627
March 1	Mexico City	Mexico	Foro Sol	Rey Pila	117,296 / 117,946	$6,344,627
March 3	Bogotá	Colombia	Salitre Magico	The Mills	24,988 / 24,988	$1,935,720
March 5	Buenos Aires	Argentina	Hipodromo de Palermo	Foxley	27,144 / 27,144	$1,511,076
March 7	Santiago	Chile	Movistar Arena	—N/a	16,160 / 16,160	$1,238,040
March 9	Porto Alegre	Brazil	FIERGS Parking	Dashboard Confessional; Dingo Bells	30,000 / 30,000	$1,649,605
March 11	Belo Horizonte	Brazil	Mineirão Stadium	Dashboard Confessional	25,000 / 25,000	$1,410,566
March 13	Salvador	Brazil	Parque de Exposições	Dashboard Confessional	36,000 / 36,000	$1,896,707
March 15	Fortaleza	Brazil	Marina Park Resort	Dashboard Confessional	30,000 / 30,000	$1,485,885
March 17	São Paulo	Brazil	Allianz Parque	Dashboard Confessional	91,868 / 91,868	$5,326,788
March 19	São Paulo	Brazil	Allianz Parque	Dashboard Confessional	91,868 / 91,868	$5,326,788
March 20	Rio de Janeiro	Brazil	Sambadrome Marquês de Sapucaí	Dashboard Confessional	35,000 / 35,000	$1,958,232
Leg 10 — Europe
May 28 (Note: The May 28, 2016, show in Lisbon at Parque da Bela Vista is part of Rock in Rio.)	Lisbon	Portugal	Parque da Bela Vista	—N/a	—N/a	—N/a
May 29	Nice	France	Stade Charles-Ehrmann	—N/a	15,798 / 16,000	$1,199,688
June 1	Kraków	Poland	Tauron Arena	—N/a	16,700 / 16,700	$1,126,048
June 3	Moscow	Russia	Olimpiysky	—N/a	15,326 / 17,000	$1,352,640
June 5	Bucharest	Romania	Piața Constituției	—N/a	29,552 / 33,000	$1,417,856
June 7 (Note: The June 7, 2016 show in Batumi at Miracle Square is part of the Check in Georgia project.)	Batumi	Georgia	Miracle Square	—N/a	30,000 / 30,000	$1,037,050
June 9 (Note: The June 9, 2016 show in Antalya, Turkey was part of Expo 2016.)	Antalya	Turkey	Antalya Kır Aktivite Alanı	—N/a	20,000 / 20,000	$203,184
Leg 11 — North America
July 13 (Note: The July 13, 2016 show in Las Vegas at T-Mobile Arena is part of Cisco Live!.)	Las Vegas	United States	T-Mobile Arena	Elle King	—N/a	—N/a
Leg 12 — Latin America
July 15	San Juan	Puerto Rico	Coliseo de Puerto Rico	—N/a	14,481 / 14,481	$1,687,568
July 17	Alajuela	Costa Rica	Coca-Cola Amphitheater	—N/a	18,404 / 18,404	$1,688,460
Leg 13 — North America
September 3	San Antonio	United States	AT&T Center	Tove Lo; R. City	15,262 / 15,476	$1,340,020
September 5	New Orleans	United States	Smoothie King Center	Tove Lo; R. City	14,290 / 14,481	$1,413,946
September 7	Miami	United States	American Airlines Arena	Tove Lo; R. City	14,286 / 14,533	$1,350,822
September 9	Orlando	United States	Amway Center	Tove Lo; R. City	13,969 / 14,163	$1,285,601
September 10	Columbia	United States	Colonial Life Arena	Tove Lo; R. City	12,597 / 13,084	$1,173,830
September 12	Memphis	United States	FedExForum	Tove Lo; R. City	10,367 / 16,805	$786,407
September 14	Knoxville	United States	Thompson–Boling Arena	Tove Lo; R. City	13,966 / 13,966	$1,232,189
September 16	Baltimore	United States	Royal Farms Arena	Tove Lo; R. City	12,272 / 12,521	$1,208,346
September 17	Worcester	United States	DCU Center	Tove Lo; R. City	11,542 / 11,744	$1,111,776
October 3	St. Louis	United States	Scottrade Center	Tove Lo; R. City	14,182 / 14,463	$1,265,067
October 4	Lincoln	United States	Pinnacle Bank Arena	Tove Lo; R. City	13,492 / 13,691	$1,189,881
October 6	Denver	United States	Pepsi Center	Tove Lo; Phases	14,196 / 14,586	$1,393,631
October 8	Salt Lake City	United States	Vivint Smart Home Arena	Tove Lo; Phases	15,332 / 20,142	$1,336,710
October 9	Boise	United States	Taco Bell Arena	Tove Lo; Phases	9,403 / 9,567	$921,447
October 11	Seattle	United States	KeyArena	Tove Lo; Phases	—N/a	—N/a
October 13	Portland	United States	Moda Center	Tove Lo; Phases	13,634 / 15,224	$1,292,883
October 15	Sacramento	United States	Golden 1 Center	Tove Lo; Phases	14,663 / 14,663	$1,560,840
October 16	Oakland	United States	Oracle Arena	Tove Lo; Phases	15,081 / 15,081	$1,466,162
November 19 (Note: The concert on November 19, 2016, in Los Angeles is part of the 2016 Airbnb Open Spotlight festival.)	Los Angeles	United States	The Oasis	Best Coast; Léon; Amy Pham; Jasmine Solano	—N/a	—N/a
December 30 (Note: The concerts on December 30 and 31, 2016, in Las Vegas is part of the New Year's Eve 2017 Festival.)	Las Vegas	United States	Mandalay Bay Events Center	PJ Morton	15,383 / 18,000	$2,655,686
December 31	Las Vegas	United States	Mandalay Bay Events Center	PJ Morton; Polly A	15,383 / 18,000	$2,655,686
2017
February 20 (Note: The concert of February 20, 2017, at the BMO Harris Bradley Center in Milwaukee was originally scheduled to take place on October 1, 2016, but was postponed due to upcoming birth of frontman Adam Levine's child.)	Milwaukee	United States	BMO Harris Bradley Center	Tinashe; R. City	15,141 / 15,505	$1,306,657
February 22 (Note: The concert of February 22, 2017, at the Quicken Loans Arena in Cleveland was originally scheduled to take place on September 28, 2016, but was postponed due to upcoming birth of frontman Adam Levine's child.)	Cleveland	United States	Quicken Loans Arena	Tinashe; R. City	13,969 / 17,349	$1,244,551
February 24 (Note: The concert of February 24, 2017, at the Bell Centre in Montreal was originally scheduled to take place on September 23, 2016, but was postponed due to upcoming birth of frontman Adam Levine's child.)	Montreal	Canada	Bell Centre	Tinashe; R. City	29,174 / 29,694	$1,965,776
February 25	Montreal	Canada	Bell Centre	Tinashe; R. City	29,174 / 29,694	$1,965,776
February 27 (Note: The concert of February 27, 2017, at the Videotron Centre in Quebec City was originally scheduled to take place on September 24, 2016, but was postponed due to upcoming birth of frontman Adam Levine's child.)	Quebec City	Canada	Videotron Centre	Tinashe; R. City	14,606 / 15,412	$1,175,272
March 1	Hamilton	Canada	FirstOntario Centre	Tinashe; R. City	13,714 / 13,714	$1,006,505
March 3 (Note: The concert of March 3, 2017, at the U.S. Bank Arena in Cincinnati was originally scheduled to take place on September 29, 2016, but was postponed due to upcoming birth of frontman Adam Levine's child.)	Cincinnati	United States	U.S. Bank Arena	Tinashe; R. City	14,442 / 14,846	$1,257,948
March 5	Rochester	United States	Blue Cross Arena	Tinashe; R. City	10,269 / 10,504	$863,267
March 7 (Note: The concert of March 7, 2017, at the Times Union Center in Albany was originally scheduled to take place on September 21, 2016, but was postponed due to upcoming birth of frontman Adam Levine's child.)	Albany	United States	Times Union Center	Tinashe; R. City	11,711 / 12,125	$1,079,029
March 8 (Note: The concert of March 8, 2017, at the KeyBank Center in Buffalo was originally scheduled to take place on September 26, 2016, but was postponed due to upcoming birth of frontman Adam Levine's child.)	Buffalo	United States	KeyBank Center	Tinashe; R. City	13,959 / 14,274	$1,365,102
April 29 (Note: The April 29, 2017 concert, in New Orleans is part of the New Orleans Jazz & Heritage Festival.)	New Orleans	United States	Fair Grounds Race Course	—N/a	—N/a	—N/a
May 13 (Note: The May 13, 2017 concert, in Carson is part of Wango Tango.)	Carson	United States	StubHub Center	—N/a	—N/a	—N/a
May 26 (Note: The May 26, 2017 concert, in Napa is part of the BottleRock Napa Valley Festival.)	Napa	United States	Napa Valley Expo	—N/a	—N/a	—N/a
July 15 (Note: The July 15, 2017 concert, in Pendleton is part of the Pendleton Whisky Music Fest Festival.)	Pendleton	United States	Pendleton Roundup	—N/a	—N/a	—N/a
September 3 (Note: The September 3, 2017 concert, in Snowmass is part of the Jazz Aspen Snowmass Experience.)	Snowmass	United States	Snowmass Town Park	The Roots; The Revivalists	—N/a	—N/a
Leg 14 — Latin America
September 12	Panama City	Panama	Estadio Nacional Rod Carew	—N/a	—N/a	—N/a
September 14	Curitiba	Brazil	Estádio Couto Pereira	—N/a	—N/a	—N/a
September 15 (Note: The September 15, 2017, show in Rio de Janeiro at Barra Olympic Park is part of Rock in Rio. Maroon 5 are stepping in for Lady Gaga as she is in hospital for severe pain.)	Rio de Janeiro	Brazil	Barra Olympic Park	—N/a	—N/a	—N/a
September 16 (Note: The September 16, 2017 show in Rio de Janeiro at Barra Olympic Park is part of Rock in Rio.)	Rio de Janeiro	Brazil	Barra Olympic Park	—N/a	—N/a	—N/a
September 19	Lima	Peru	Estadio Nacional de Lima	Incubus	—N/a	—N/a
Leg 15 — North America
December 30 (Note: The concerts on December 30 and 31, 2017, in Las Vegas is part of the New Year's Eve 2018 Festival.)	Las Vegas	United States	Mandalay Bay Events Center	—N/a	—N/a	—N/a
December 31	Las Vegas	United States	Mandalay Bay Events Center	—N/a	—N/a	—N/a
2018
Leg 16 — Latin America
March 1	Quito	Ecuador	Estadio Olímpico Atahualpa	—N/a	—N/a	—N/a
March 3 (Note: The March 3, 2018 show in Guatemala City at Explanada Cardales de Cayalá was originally scheduled to take place on September 21, 2017, but was postponed due to circumstances beyond their control.)	Guatemala City	Guatemala	Explanada Cardales de Cayalá	De La Rut	—N/a	—N/a
May 12	Zapopan	Mexico	Estadio Omnilife	—N/a	—N/a	—N/a
Total					1,864,417 / 1,926,840 (96.76%)	$142,434,531

== Cancelled shows ==
List of cancelled concerts, showing date, city, country, venue and reason for cancellation
Date	City	Country	Venue	Reason
2015
May 29	Liverpool	England	Echo Arena	Adam Levine's throat injury
September 1	Osaka	Japan	Osaka-Jo Hall	Scheduling issues
September 12	Shanghai	China	Mercedes-Benz Arena	No official reason given: Possibly banned by Chinese authorities due to support of Dalai Lama.
September 23	Jakarta	Indonesia	Indonesia Convention Exhibition	Celebration of Idul Adha
2016
September 11	Charlotte	United States	Spectrum Center	Opposition of the Public Facilities Privacy & Security Act in North Carolina
September 12	Raleigh	United States	PNC Arena	Opposition of the Public Facilities Privacy & Security Act in North Carolina
September 19	Hartford	United States	XL Center	Upcoming birth of frontman Adam Levine's child
2017
June 10 (Note: The June 10, 2017, concert in London at Wembley Stadium was originally to be part of the Summertime Ball, but was cancelled due to scheduling conflict. Subsequently, the group was replaced by Liam Payne and Sigala.)	London	England	Wembley Stadium	Scheduling conflict
September 9	Punta Cana	Dominican Republic	Hard Rock Hotel & Casino	Hurricane Irma
