= V (Maroon 5 album) =

Studio album by Maroon 5
- Released: August 29, 2014
- Recorded: 2013–2014
- Studios: Conway Studios (Hollywood, California); Kingston Sound (Los Angeles, California); Luke's in the Boo (Malibu, California); Matzah Ball (New York, New York City); MXM (Stockholm, Sweden); Patriot (Denver, Colorado); Record Plant (Los Angeles, California)
- Genres: Pop rock; new wave; electropop
- Length: 40:10
- Labels: 222; Interscope
- Producers: Gregg Alexander; Ammo; Astma & Rocwell; Benny Blanco; Johan Carlsson; Cirkut; Jason Evigan; Rodney "Darkchild" Jerkins; Adam Levine; Andre Lindal; The Monsters and the Strangerz; OzGo; Shellback; Stargate; Ryan Tedder; Noel Zancanella

Maroon 5 chronology
Overexposed (2012)	V (2014)	Singles (2015)

Singles from V
- 1. "Maps" Released: June 16, 2014; 2. "Animals" Released: August 25, 2014; 3. "Sugar" Released: January 13, 2015; 4. "This Summer's Gonna Hurt like a Motherfucker" Released: May 15, 2015; 5. "Feelings" Released: September 14, 2015

V (Roman numeral for five) is the fifth studio album by the American rock band Maroon 5. The album was released on August 29, 2014, through 222 and Interscope Records. V was Maroon 5's first album to be released through Interscope after the band's previous label, A&M Octone Records, transferred them along with most of its artists to Interscope. The album also saw the return of keyboardist/rhythm guitarist/backing vocalist Jesse Carmichael, after his absence from recording, touring and promoting the band's previous album, Overexposed, which was released in 2012. It debuted at number one on the US Billboard 200 and produced with three hit singles, "Maps", "Animals", and "Sugar", peaking at numbers 6, 3 and 2 on the US Billboard Hot 100, respectively. A fourth single "This Summer's Gonna Hurt like a Motherfucker", was released on May 15, 2015, from the reissue deluxe edition of the album. "Feelings" was released as the album's fifth and final single on September 14, 2015. The album received mixed reviews from music critics.

== Background and production ==
In 2012, Maroon 5 released their fourth studio album, Overexposed. The record was released during a time of commercial momentum for the band following the success of "Moves like Jagger" (recorded with American singer Christina Aguilera), a single which lead singer Adam Levine credited as having "revived the group", and the album's lead single, "Payphone", which became both a critical and commercial success. Overexposed was described by the band as their "most poppiest [sic] record to date", with critics giving the album mixed reviews upon its release.

V was recorded by the band at Conway Studios in downtown Los Angeles, California, over a year-long period from 2013 through to mid 2014. The recording sessions for V saw the band's rhythm guitarist/keyboardist Jesse Carmichael return to the band after a two-year hiatus, which saw him absent during the recording and promotion for Overexposed. The album also features a collaboration with Gwen Stefani called "My Heart Is Open", co-written with Australian singer Sia. Guitarist James Valentine stated that the band had known Sia for a long time and working with her was "really cool".

== Artwork ==
The album cover for V was created by South Korean photographer Lee Jung. It features a 1.3m neon lighted crosstube formed in the shape of the roman numeral for five, the title of the album. The red neon display is placed in front of a reservoir in the Gyeonggi Province, with mountains in the background. The Maroon 5 logo appears out of focus in the background as a sign perched on the side of the mountain, similar to the famous Hollywood Sign. An alternate cover for the album was created by Indonesian graphic designer Bayo Gale (who won the band's alternate album cover art contest). It features the tiger's face with a shape of the letter V with a vertex at the bottom and the Maroon 5 logo.

== Release and promotion ==
Departing from then-active A&M Octone Records, the band signed with its related label, Interscope Records and frontman Levine's record label 222 Records to release the album. V was unveiled by the band and Interscope on May 19, 2014, slated for a release date of September 2, 2014, in the United States. Through a signed contract with Live Nation, the band had also announced plans to go on tour in late 2014 through to early 2015 in support of V. The artwork for V was unveiled through a series of five puzzle piece clues released daily through the band's Facebook page from July 17 through to July 21. After the series was completed, the album's artwork, in addition to its track listing, were unveiled on July 21, 2014. The album also includes a limited-edition of ZinePak. Moreover, to promote the album, Maroon 5 performed at the iHeartRadio Theater in Burbank, California on August 26, 2014 and on The Today Show (as part of the Toyota concert series) at Rockefeller Plaza in New York City, New York on September 1. Later, the band started the Maroon V Tour in February 2015 at venues mainly to take place in North America and Europe. The tour ended on May 12, 2018, in Zapopan, Mexico, comprising 137 shows.

== Singles ==
"Maps" was released as the album's lead single on June 16, 2014. The song peaked at number 6 on the US Billboard Hot 100, giving the band their ninth top-ten hit in the country. "Maps" also reached the top-ten in an additional fourteen countries, including a peak of number 2 on the UK Singles Chart.

"Animals" was released as the album's second single on August 25, 2014. The song peaked at number 3 on the US Billboard Hot 100, giving the band their tenth top-ten hit in the country. The song also peaked within the top-ten in an additional ten countries, and has also sold in excess of 200,000 copies in the UK alone. Likewise with their previous single, "Animals" achieved platinum status in the US for sales exceeding 1,000,000 copies.

"Sugar" was released on January 13, 2015, as the album's third single. It is the most successful single from the album, reaching the top-ten in 24 countries, including number 6 in Australia, number 7 on the UK Singles Chart, and number two on the US Billboard Hot 100.

"This Summer's Gonna Hurt like a Motherfucker" was released on May 15, 2015, as the album's fourth single. Through it doesn’t appear on the standard edition, it is included on the album's reissue deluxe edition.

"Feelings" was sent to US contemporary hit and adult contemporary radio on September 14, 2015, served as the album's fifth and final single.

=== Promotional single ===
"It Was Always You" was released on July 29, 2014, as the first and only promotional single of the album. The song peaked at number 40 on the UK Singles Chart and number 45 on the US Billboard Hot 100.

== Critical reception ==
Professional ratings
Aggregate scores
Source	Rating
AnyDecentMusic?	5.0/10
Metacritic	55/100
Review scores
Source	Rating
AllMusic	3.5/5 stars
The A.V. Club	C+
Billboard	4.5/5 stars
Entertainment Weekly	C
The Guardian	2/5 stars
Idolator	4/5 stars
New York Daily News	2/5 stars
PopMatters	5/10 discs
Rolling Stone	4/5 stars
USA Today	2.5/4 stars

V received generally mixed reviews upon its release. On Metacritic, V received a weighted average score of 55/100 based on 12 reviews, indicating "mixed or average reviews". In a four-star review, Jon Dolan of Rolling Stone called the songs "precision-tuned and lustrously polished, jammed with hooks and choruses that build a man cave in your brain." Brian Mansfield of USA Today gave the album two and a half stars out of four, remarking the album was "easy to digest and contains all sorts of flavors while still being its own thing." In an 86 out of 100 review for Billboard, Brad Wete argued the album "reveals that their foundation has not been removed." Writing on behalf of AllMusic, Stephen Thomas Erlewine rated the album three and a half stars out of five, praising the band for "[embracing] the tuneful, slightly soulful adult contemporary pop band they've always been".

In a mixed review, Kyle Anderson of Entertainment Weekly graded the album a C, suggesting Levine's songwriting didn't "live up to his ability to work a crowd." Writing for The Guardian, Tim Jonze gave the album two out of five stars, dismissing it as "evidence as to why most people can't remember a Maroon 5 song two seconds after it finishes." In a two star review from The Observer, Theo Leanse called the album "a gaudy chunk of over-produced electro-pop-rock", but noted its accessibility, saying it "flips a smug V-sign at us, knowing we'll never free its singles from our skulls." But, Kathy Iandoli of Idolator gave the album 4 out of 5 stars and called the album "lives up to that formula of big songs while never faltering, for better or for worse".

Evan Rytlewski gave a C+ review on behalf of The A.V. Club commenting the band "stayed hip", but only by "furnishing a too-perfect, soundstage ideal of whatever the kids are into these days." In the New York Daily News, Jim Farber criticized the hooks on the album for being "so annoying, you won't be able to scrub them from your mind." Annie Galvin delivered a 5/10 review for PopMatters stating, "As far as lightweight, easy-listening charts pop goes, V doesn't totally offend the sensibilities, and that's surely more than can be said about some of Maroon 5's overly pandering, less exploratory 'pop-rock' peers."

== Commercial performance ==
In the United States, the album debuted at number one on the Billboard 200, with first week sales of 164,000 copies and earned their second US number-one album and their first since 2007's It Won't Be Soon Before Long. As of August 2015, it has sold over one million copies in the US.

In Canada, the album also debuted at number one on the Canadian Albums Chart, with 15,000 copies sold for the week. In its second week, the album remained at number one with 7,700 copies.

== Track listing ==
Standard edition
No.	Title	Writer(s)	Producer(s)	Length
1.	"Maps"	Adam Levine; Ryan Tedder; Benjamin Levin; Ammar Malik; Noel Zancanella	Benny Blanco; Tedder; Zancanella; Noah Passovoy^{[a]}	3:10
2.	"Animals"	Levine; Shellback; Levin	Shellback	3:51
3.	"It Was Always You"	Levine; Sam Martin; Jason Evigan; Marcus Lomax; Jordan Johnson; Stefan Johnson	Evigan; The Monsters and the Strangerz; S. Johnson^{[b]}; Martin^{[b]}; Isaiah Tejada^{[b]}	4:00
4.	"Unkiss Me"	Levine; Johan Carlsson; Ross Golan	Carlsson; Passovoy^{[b]}	3:58
5.	"Sugar"	Levine; Joshua Coleman; Lukasz Gottwald; Jacob Kasher Hindlin; Mike Posner; Henry Walter	Ammo; Cirkut	3:55
6.	"Leaving California"	Levine; Levin; Nate Ruess; Malik; Tor Erik Hermansen; Mikkel Storleer Eriksen	Blanco; Stargate; Passovoy^{[a]}	3:23
7.	"In Your Pocket"	Levine; Shellback; T. Jimson; M. Flygare	Shellback; Astma & Rocwell	3:39
8.	"New Love"	Levine; Tedder; Zancanella	Tedder; Zancanella	3:16
9.	"Coming Back for You"	Levine; Martin; Evigan; Lomax; J. Johnson; S. Johnson	Evigan; The Monsters and the Strangerz; S. Johnson^{[b]}; Martin^{[b]}; Tejada^{[b]}	3:46
10.	"Feelings"	Levine; Shellback; Oscar Görres	Shellback; OzGo	3:14
11.	"My Heart Is Open" (featuring Gwen Stefani)	Levine; Levin; Sia Furler; Rodney Jerkins; Andre Lindal	Blanco; Darkchild; Lindal; Levine	3:57
Total length:				40:10

Deluxe edition bonus tracks
No.	Title	Writer(s)	Producer(s)	Length
12.	"This Summer's Gonna Hurt like a Motherfucker"	Levine; Shellback	Shellback	3:44
13.	"Shoot Love"	Levine; Levin; Malik; Shellback; Paul Epworth	Shellback; Epworth^{[a]}	3:10
14.	"Sex and Candy"	John Wozniak		4:26
15.	"Lost Stars" (by Adam Levine)	Gregg Alexander; Danielle Brisebois; Nick Lashley; Nick Southwood	Alexander	4:28
Total length:				55:56

Notes

- ^{^[a]} signifies an additional producer
- ^{^[b]} signifies a vocal producer

== Personnel ==
Credits for V are taken from V CD booklet.

Maroon 5

- Adam Levine – vocals (all), songwriting (1–13), production (tracks 11 & 14)
- Jesse Carmichael – keyboards (tracks 1–10, 13, 14), backing vocals (4), guitar (12), gang vocals (12)
- Mickey Madden – bass (tracks 1–10, 12–14)
- James Valentine – lead guitar (tracks 1–10, 12–14), gang vocals (12)
- Matt Flynn – drums, percussion (tracks 1–10, 12–14)
- PJ Morton – keyboards (1–14), gang vocals (12)

Additional musicians

- Sam Schamberg – additional handclaps and backing vocals
- Jason Fields – additional handclaps and backing vocals
- Travis Leete – additional handclaps and backing vocals
- Shawn Tellez – additional handclaps and backing vocals
- Shellback – songwriting, production, additional instrumentation, backing vocals, programming
- Sam Farrar – backing vocals, programming
- Ashley Cahill – backing vocals
- Ryan Jackson-Healy – backing vocals
- Ross Golan – backing vocals, songwriting
- Johan Carlsson – songwriting, additional instrumentation, keyboards, mixing, production, programming, vocal production, backing vocals
- Mattias Bylund – strings
- Dr. Luke – instrumentation, programming, drums, guitar, keyboards, percussion, programming, synth bass
- Ammo & Cirkut – additional instrumentation and programming
- Mike Posner – additional vocals, composer
- Stargate – additional instrumentation, production, programming
- Aryn Wüthrich – backing vocals
- Astma & Rocwell – additional instrumentation and programming
- The Monsters and the Strangerz – songwriting, production, additional instrumentation
- Gwen Stefani – vocals (featured guest on "My Heart Is Open")
- Phil Peterson – strings

Technical

- Ryan Tedder – songwriting, production, additional instrumentation, programming
- John Armstrong – assistant
- Astma – additional instrumentation, production, programming
- Tim Blacksmith – executive production
- Max Martin – executive production, vocal production
- Noah "Mailbox" Passovoy – production
- Benny Blanco – songwriting, production, additional instrumentation, programming
- Ammar Malik – songwriting
- Tom Coyne – mastering
- Danny D. – executive producer
- Mikkel Storleer Eriksen – songwriting, engineer
- Jason Evigan – songwriting, additional instrumentation, production, programming, vocal production
- Eric Eylands – assistant
- Rachael Findlen – assistant
- Michel Flygare – songwriting, production
- Serban Ghenea – mixing
- Clint Gibbs – engineer
- Oscar Görres (OzGo) – songwriting, production, additional instrumentation, programming
- John Hanes – mixing
- Tor Erik Hermansen – songwriting
- Jacob Hindlin – songwriting
- Sia – songwriting
- Nate Ruess – songwriting
- Rodney "Darkchild" Jerkins – songwriting, production
- Andre Lindal – songwriting, production
- Joshua Coleman – songwriting, production
- Lee Jung – photography
- Seif "Mageef" Hussain – production coordination

== Charts ==
=== Weekly charts ===
Weekly chart performance for V
Chart (2014)	Peak position
Australian Albums (ARIA)	4
Austrian Albums (Ö3 Austria)	10
Belgian Albums (Ultratop Flanders)	12
Belgian Albums (Ultratop Wallonia)	7
Canadian Albums (Billboard)	1
China (Sino Chart)	2
Croatian International Albums (HDU)	4
Czech Albums (ČNS IFPI)	40
Danish Albums (Hitlisten)	3
Dutch Albums (Album Top 100)	11
Finnish Albums (Suomen virallinen lista)	6
French Albums (SNEP)	6
German Albums (Offizielle Top 100)	6
Greek Albums (IFPI)	11
Hungarian Albums (MAHASZ)	12
Indian Albums (IMI)	1
Irish Albums (IRMA)	7
Italian Albums (FIMI)	2
Japanese Albums (Oricon)	4
Mexican Albums (AMPROFON)	5
New Zealand Albums (RMNZ)	11
Norwegian Albums (VG-lista)	4
Polish Albums (ZPAV)	43
Portuguese Albums (AFP)	12
Scottish Albums (Official Charts)	5
South Korean Albums (Circle)	6
South Korean International Albums (Circle)	2
Spanish Albums (Promusicae)	4
Swedish Albums (Sverigetopplistan)	5
Swiss Albums (Schweizer Hitparade)	2
Taiwan International Albums (G-Music)	1
UK Albums (Official Charts)	4
US Billboard 200	1

=== Year-end charts ===
2014 year-end chart performance for V
Chart (2014)	Position
Belgian Albums (Ultratop Wallonia)	132
Canadian Albums (Billboard)	21
French Albums (SNEP)	114
Japanese Albums (Oricon)	62
Mexican Albums (AMPROFON)	43
South Korean International Albums (Circle)	18
Swedish Albums (Sverigetopplistan)	40
US Billboard 200	35

2015 year-end chart performance for V
Chart (2015)	Position
Australian Albums (ARIA)	55
Canadian Albums (Billboard)	25
Danish Albums (Hitlisten)	13
French Albums (SNEP)	85
Japanese Albums (Billboard Japan)	71
Mexican Albums (AMPROFON)	16
New Zealand Albums (RMNZ)	25
South Korean International Albums (Circle)	20
Spanish Albums (PROMUSICAE)	51
Swedish Albums (Sverigetopplistan)	20
UK Albums (OCC)	47
US Billboard 200	6

2016 year-end chart performance for V
Chart (2016)	Position
US Billboard 200	113

=== Decade-end charts ===
Decade-end chart performance for V
Chart (2010–2019)	Position
US Billboard 200	58

== Certifications ==
Certifications for V
Region	Certification	Certified units/sales
Australia (ARIA)	Platinum	70,000^{‡}
Austria (IFPI Austria)	Platinum	15,000^{*}
Brazil (Pro-Música Brasil) Deluxe	2× Diamond	320,000^{‡}
Brazil (Pro-Música Brasil)	2× Diamond	320,000^{‡}
Canada (Music Canada)	3× Platinum	240,000^{‡}
Denmark (IFPI Danmark)	3× Platinum	60,000^{‡}
France (SNEP)	Gold	50,000^{*}
Germany (BVMI)	Gold	100,000^{‡}
Italy (FIMI)	Platinum	50,000^{‡}
Japan (RIAJ)	Gold	100,000^{^}
Mexico (AMPROFON)	Diamond	300,000^{^}
New Zealand (RMNZ)	3× Platinum	45,000^{‡}
Poland (ZPAV)	Platinum	20,000^{‡}
Singapore (RIAS)	2× Platinum	20,000^{*}
Sweden (GLF)	Platinum	40,000^{‡}
United Kingdom (BPI)	Platinum	300,000^{‡}
United States (RIAA)	3× Platinum	3,000,000^{‡}
^{*} Sales figures based on certification alone.^{^} Shipments figures based on certification alone.^{‡} Sales+streaming figures based on certification alone.

== Release history ==
Release history and formats for V
Region	Date	Format(s)	Edition(s)	Label	Ref.
Germany	August 29, 2014	CD; digital download	Standard; deluxe	222; Interscope	
New Zealand	August 29, 2014	CD; digital download	Standard; deluxe	222; Interscope	
South Korea	September 1, 2014	CD; digital download	Standard; deluxe	Universal	
United States	September 2, 2014	CD; digital download	Standard; deluxe	222; Interscope	
China	November 1, 2014	CD; digital download	Standard	Universal	
Various	May 15, 2015	CD; digital download	Reissue; deluxe	222; Interscope	
Australia	August 14, 2015	CD; digital download	Extended	222; Interscope	
