= Animals (Maroon 5 song) =

2014 single by Maroon 5

Single by Maroon 5

from the album V
- Released: August 25, 2014
- Studio: MXM, Stockholm; Conway, Los Angeles
- Genre: Pop rock
- Length: 3:51
- Label: 222; Interscope
- Songwriters: Adam Levine; Shellback; Benjamin Levin
- Producer: Shellback

Maroon 5 singles chronology
| "Maps" (2014) | "Animals" (2014) | "Sugar" (2015) |

Music video
- "Animals" on YouTube

"Animals" is a song by the American rock band Maroon 5. It was released on August 25, 2014, as the second single from their fifth studio album V (2014). The song was written by lead singer and rhythm guitarist Adam Levine with Benny Blanco and Shellback, who also produced it. The lyrics use animal metaphors to describe a breakup that might not last.

The song peaked at number three on the US Billboard Hot 100, giving Maroon 5 their tenth top 10 single in the US. Internationally, it was also a top 10 hit in many countries, even going to number 1 in Bulgaria.

== Promotion ==
To promote the song, Kia Motors debuted an advertisement of 2015 Kia Soul EV model on August 21, 2014. For a limited time after the commercial premiered, "Animals" was available for free download on the Kia website only. Later, Maroon 5 released the song's lyric video on August 22, 2014, from their YouTube channel. The commercial also appeared at the 2014 MTV Video Music Awards on August 24, and the song was released the next day.

== Remixes ==
The remix versions of "Animals" featuring with American rappers, J. Cole released on September 30, 2014, and Big Boi premiered execlusively on Pigeons & Planes website on December 18, both written and produced by Freaky Ta, DCBC and Aftermath artist Me3mo (Sameem Nadeem).

== Critical reception ==
Rolling Stone ranked "Animals" at number 32 on its year-end list of the 50 best songs of 2014, stating: "don't even bother trying to resist this hook. It'll be in your head until 2016." Young Hollywood placed the song at number three on their 10 Hit Songs Turning 10 in 2024! list, with writer Ashley Parham praising its upbeat and danceable pop rock sound.

== Music video ==
The music video was released on September 29, 2014, on Vevo. Directed by Samuel Bayer, the video features lead singer Adam Levine and his wife, Behati Prinsloo. The other musicians of Maroon 5 (including their touring member Sam Farrar, the first time he appeared in a music video with the band) also make an appearance—they are seen playing at a nightclub in some scenes of the video. The story of the video is inspired by the film American Psycho (2000).

=== Synopsis ===
A scene from the video, presenting a fantasy that features Levine and Prinsloo as obsessed lovers.

The video starts with an opening sequence which is a reference to the film Seven and noise of the Kodak 35 camera. It follows a woman (Prinsloo) entering a butcher shop, where Levine's character works. After she leaves, an infatuated Levine begins to stalk the woman by following her in the streets and standing outside her apartment in the pouring rain to watch her. He also watches the woman sleep and takes numerous photos of her, which he later trims and places on wires around a dark room. Intercut with this are scenes of a shirtless Levine dripping in fake blood, singing the song inside a meat locker and using animal carcasses for punching bags (an apparent reference to Rocky). One evening, Levine follows the woman into a nightclub, where he tries to talk to her. Though Prinsloo is amused by Levine and his interest in her, she spends the evening talking to her girlfriends instead. Eventually, Levine is left with no luck, so he goes back to fantasizing about her. After an erotic dream, Levine wakes up in shock and returns to stalking Prinsloo by standing outside her apartment in the rain, watching in a dazed state, leading to the similar opening. The final scenes feature Levine and Prinsloo as obsessed lovers having sex while covered in blood (an apparent reference to both Carrie and The Shining).

=== Reception and controversy ===
The music video was heavily panned by critics and has been condemned for dehumanizing women and glamorizing violence. Jessica Valenti of The Guardian criticized the video for attempting to make violence against women seem "edgy", stating that "there is nothing 'alternative' about showing women being stalked, hunted, raped or killed because it’s something that happens every damn day." RAINN (Rape, Abuse & Incest National Network) released a statement condemning the video, which said that "no one should ever confuse the criminal act of stalking with romance. The trivialisation of these serious crimes, like stalking, should have no place in the entertainment industry."

In a 2018 interview with The Independent, Levine dismissed the criticism, calling it "fucking ridiculous", and saying about the video, "It was supposed to be creepy! I play the role of the creep, it's literally a character out of a movie. And the song is about animalistic tendencies, I'm talking about eating someone alive. Use your fucking imagination. It's like watching a horror film and notifying the people who made it to tell them you think they're disgusting. People are sometimes too rooted in reality and they can't differentiate. They take everything too personally."

== Chart performance ==
Commercially in the United States, "Animals" debuted at number 86 on the US Billboard Hot 100 chart. On October 8, 2014, the song rose from the number 33 to 8, giving the band their tenth top-ten hit overall and their seventh consecutive Hot 100 top-ten hit since the 2011 chart-topping single "Moves like Jagger". The song reached its million sales mark in the US in November 2014. The song peaked at number three on the Billboard Hot 100 issue dating November 22, 2014 and spent fourteen weeks in the top 10.

In other countries, "Animals" made the top-ten progress as well, peaking at number two on the Canadian Hot 100 in Canada. It was also a moderate success in the United Kingdom, where it peaked at number 27 on the UK Singles Chart.

== Live performances ==
On October 20, 2014, Maroon 5 performed "Animals" for the 2014 NRJ Music Tour at Maison de la Mutualité in Paris, France. The same month, Maroon 5 performed the song on Saturday Night Live (along with "Maps"), as well as The X Factor, and the television talk shows C à vous (C to You) in France and The Graham Norton Show in the UK, respectively. On November 10, 2014, Maroon 5 performed the song on the seventh season of The Voice. In December 2014, the band performed "Animals" in a mash-up with "This Love" for A Very Grammy Christmas concert (December 5) at the Shrine Auditorium in Los Angeles, California, and performed the song at the iHeartRadio Jingle Ball Tour 2014 (December 12) in Madison Square Garden, New York City. On December 18, 2014, Maroon 5 also performed "Animals" during the People Magazine Awards ceremony at Beverly Hilton Hotel in Beverly Hills, California.

The band played the track in Puerto Rico for the first edition of Victoria's Secret Swim Special, which aired on February 26, 2015. Maroon 5 played the song at the NCAA March Madness Music Festival between 2016 and 2018. It is part of a setlist for the worldwide concert tour, the Maroon V Tour (2015–2018).

== Track listing ==
Digital download

1. "Animals" – 3:51

Digital download – Remix featuring J Cole

1. "Animals" (Remix) (featuring J Cole) – 4:00

Digital download – Remix featuring Big Boi

1. "Animals" (Remix) (featuring Big Boi) – 4:00

Digital download – Gryffin Remix

1. "Animals" (Gryffin Remix) – 5:18

Digital download – Danny Olson Remix

1. "Animals" (Danny Olson Remix) – 5:00

Digital download – Sammy Bananas Remix

1. "Animals" (Sammy Bananas Remix) – 5:40

Digital download – Zaeden Remix

1. "Animals" (Zaeden Remix) – 5:00

== Credits and personnel ==
Credits adapted from the liner notes of V.

Locations

- Recorded at Conway Studios, Los Angeles; MXM Studios, Stockholm
- Mixed at MixStar Studios, Virginia Beach

Personnel

- Songwriting – Adam Levine, Shellback, Benjamin Levin
- Production – Shellback
- Lead vocals – Adam Levine
- Instrumentation, background vocals, programming – Shellback
- Mixing – Serban Ghenea
- Vocals recording – Shellback, Max Martin
- Engineering – Noah Passovoy
- Assistant engineers – Eric Eylands, Tim Roberts
- Mix engineer – John Hanes
- Lead and rhythm guitar – James Valentine, Jesse Carmichael
- Bass – Mickey Madden
- Drums and percussion – Matt Flynn
- Keyboards and synthesizers – Jesse Carmichael, PJ Morton

== Charts ==
=== Weekly charts ===
| Chart (2014–2015) | Peak position |
|---|---|
| Australia (ARIA) | 62 |
| Austria (Ö3 Austria Top 40) | 26 |
| Belgium (Ultratop 50 Flanders) | 47 |
| Belgium (Ultratop 50 Wallonia) | 22 |
| Bulgaria (IFPI) | 1 |
| Canada Hot 100 (Billboard) | 2 |
| Canada AC (Billboard) | 1 |
| Canada CHR/Top 40 (Billboard) | 1 |
| Canada Hot AC (Billboard) | 1 |
| CIS Airplay (TopHit) | 56 |
| Czech Republic Airplay (ČNS IFPI) | 25 |
| Czech Republic Singles Digital (ČNS IFPI) | 3 |
| Denmark (Tracklisten) | 15 |
| Finland (Suomen virallinen lista) | 4 |
| Finland Airplay (Radiosoittolista) | 10 |
| France (SNEP) | 25 |
| Germany (GfK) | 11 |
| Hungary (Rádiós Top 40) | 2 |
| Hungary (Single Top 40) | 8 |
| Ireland (IRMA) | 23 |
| Israel International Airplay (Media Forest) | 5 |
| Italy (FIMI) | 8 |
| Italian Airplay (EarOne) | 7 |
| Lebanon (OLT20) | 2 |
| Mexico (Billboard Mexican Airplay) | 5 |
| Mexico Anglo (Monitor Latino) | 4 |
| Netherlands (Dutch Top 40) | 19 |
| Netherlands (Single Top 100) | 18 |
| New Zealand (Recorded Music NZ) | 11 |
| Norway (VG-lista) | 15 |
| Poland Airplay (ZPAV) | 4 |
| Scottish Singles Sales (Official Charts) | 27 |
| Slovakia Airplay (ČNS IFPI) | 34 |
| Slovakia Singles Digital (ČNS IFPI) | 2 |
| Slovenia (SloTop50) | 18 |
| South Africa Airplay (EMA) | 7 |
| South Korea (Gaon) | 12 |
| Spain (Promusicae) | 12 |
| Sweden (Sverigetopplistan) | 17 |
| Switzerland (Schweizer Hitparade) | 18 |
| UK Singles (Official Charts) | 27 |
| Ukraine Airplay (TopHit) | 4 |
| US Billboard Hot 100 | 3 |
| US Adult Contemporary (Billboard) | 11 |
| US Adult Pop Airplay (Billboard) | 1 |
| US Dance Airplay (Billboard) | 4 |
| US Latin Airplay (Billboard) | 32 |
| US Pop Airplay (Billboard) | 1 |
| US Rhythmic Airplay (Billboard) | 21 |

=== Year-end charts ===
| Chart (2014) | Position |
|---|---|
| Canada (Canadian Hot 100) | 60 |
| France (SNEP) | 144 |
| Germany (Official German Charts) | 85 |
| Hungary (Rádiós Top 40) | 58 |
| Hungary (Single Top 40) | 64 |
| Italy (FIMI) | 77 |
| Netherlands (Dutch Top 40) | 71 |
| Netherlands (Single Top 100) | 63 |
| Sweden (Sverigetopplistan) | 87 |
| Ukraine Airplay (Tophit) | 137 |
| US Billboard Hot 100 | 62 |
| Chart (2015) | Position |
| Canada (Canadian Hot 100) | 41 |
| France (SNEP) | 120 |
| Hungary (Rádiós Top 40) | 100 |
| Italy (FIMI) | 86 |
| Spain (PROMUSICAE) | 85 |
| US Billboard Hot 100 | 46 |
| US Adult Contemporary (Billboard) | 22 |
| US Adult Top 40 (Billboard) | 25 |
| US Mainstream Top 40 (Billboard) | 34 |

== Certifications ==
| Region | Certification | Certified units/sales |
|---|---|---|
| Australia (ARIA) | 3× Platinum | 210,000^{‡} |
| Brazil (Pro-Música Brasil) | 3× Diamond | 750,000^{‡} |
| Canada (Music Canada) | 2× Platinum | 160,000^{*} |
| Denmark (IFPI Danmark) | 2× Platinum | 180,000^{‡} |
| Germany (BVMI) | Platinum | 400,000^{‡} |
| Italy (FIMI) | Platinum | 30,000^{‡} |
| New Zealand (RMNZ) | 3× Platinum | 90,000^{‡} |
| Spain (Promusicae) | Platinum | 40,000^{‡} |
| Sweden (GLF) | 2× Platinum | 80,000^{‡} |
| United Kingdom (BPI) | 2× Platinum | 1,200,000^{‡} |
| United States | — | 1,000,000 |
Streaming
| Denmark (IFPI Danmark) | Platinum | 2,600,000^{†} |
| Spain (Promusicae) | Gold | 4,000,000^{†} |
^{*} Sales figures based on certification alone.^{‡} Sales+streaming figures based on certification alone.^{†} Streaming-only figures based on certification alone.

== Release history ==
| Region | Date | Format | Version | Label(s) | Ref. |
|---|---|---|---|---|---|
| Various | August 25, 2014 | Digital download | Original | 222; Interscope | |
| United States | September 23, 2014 | Contemporary hit radio | Original | 222; Interscope | |
| Various | September 30, 2014 | Digital download | Remix featuring J. Cole | 222; Interscope | |
| United States | October 21, 2014 | Rhythmic contemporary radio | Remix featuring J. Cole | 222; Interscope | |
| Italy | November 7, 2014 | Contemporary hit radio | Original | Universal | |
| Germany | November 14, 2014 | CD | Original; Remix featuring J. Cole | Universal | |
| Various | November 17, 2014 | Digital download; streaming | Gryffin Remix | 222; Interscope | |
| Various | November 17, 2014 | Digital download; streaming | Sammy Bananas Remix | 222; Interscope | |
| United States | December 18, 2014 | Digital download | Remix featuring Big Boi | 222; Interscope | |
