= Rozzi Crane =

Rozzi
- Rozzi in 2026

Background information
- Born: Rosalind Elizabeth Crane; May 2, 1991 (age 35)
- Origin: San Francisco, California, U.S.
- Genres: Pop; indie pop; soul
- Occupations: Singer; songwriter; musician
- Instruments: Vocals
- Years active: 2012–present
- Website: Official website

Rosalind Elizabeth Crane (born May 2, 1991), known professionally as Rozzi, is an American singer-songwriter from San Francisco. Rozzi was initially discovered by Maroon 5 lead singer Adam Levine, which led to her touring with the band alongside acts such as Kelly Clarkson and Gavin DeGraw. Since, she has performed and collaborated with artists such as Billie Eilish, Kendrick Lamar, PJ Morton, Nile Rodgers, and Sheryl Crow. She released her first album, Bad Together, in 2018, followed by Berry (Deluxe) in 2022 and Fig Tree in 2026.

== Life and career ==
Crane attended Marin Academy High School, where she participated in their musical program.

In 2009, Crane attended the Thornton School of Music at the University of Southern California as a member of the inaugural class of the Popular Music program. During her first year, Crane's original compositions were licensed for the first time when four of her songs were featured in the Lifetime television film Sins of the Mother. During her sophomore and junior years, Crane was a background vocalist for Don Henley and Sergio Mendes.

In 2012, she became the first artist signed to Adam Levine's record label, 222 Records, where she launched three EPs, Rozzi Crane in 2013, Space and Time in 2015, respectively.

Crane was featured on the Maroon 5 song "Come Away to the Water", which was part of The Hunger Games soundtrack. In 2013, Crane toured with the band for their Overexposed Tour. In 2014, Crane toured as an opening for Gavin DeGraw and Parachute, and in 2015 she opened for Maroon 5 during their Maroon V Tour in United States and Canada. Also in 2015, she opened for Owl City's On the Verge Tour for his album Mobile Orchestra.

In April 2015, Elvis Duran picked Crane as his Artist of the Month and she performed her single "Psycho" live on NBC's Today show hosted by Kathie Lee Gifford and Hoda Kotb.

As of 2018, Crane is signed to Small Giant Records/Columbia Records. In 2018, she released her first full-length album, Bad Together. Crane's first single "Never Over You" was released on February 9, 2018. Crane released a video of the recording at Capitol Records. She also performed the single on Jimmy Kimmel Live.

In 2019, Crane recorded a cover version of "Creep" by Radiohead, for the first season soundtrack of The Morning Show, where she also appeared in the episode "A Seat at the Table" as a lounge singer. The cover also appeared in the 2026 film Ladies First.

In May 2020, Crane launched a podcast with co-host Scott Hoying called Ugh! You're So Good!, featuring guests such as Jonathan Van Ness, Christina Perri, Adam Rippon, and Rickey Minor. Season 2 of Ugh! You're So Good! premiered February 2021. Crane released two singles in 2020 and co-wrote "Love Songs" for Daryl Braithwaite, which went gold in Australia.

In 2021, she released the EP Hymn For Tomorrow. Its first single "Hymn for Tomorrow" was released in February 2021. The music video for the single features her boyfriend Alex Wolff.

On April 22, 2022, she released an EP titled Berry, which featured an appearance from Nile Rodgers. A deluxe version, with tracks from Hymn For Tomorrow and new bonus tracks, one of which featured PJ Morton, was released in November 2022. In the same year, her track “Best Friend Song” was featured during the opening credits of the Me Time, starring Kevin Hart and Mark Wahlberg.

In 2024, Rozzi appeared and provided background vocals for Billie Eilish in a series of live session videos for Amazon.

In 2025, she worked with Sounds Right to contribute a new rendition of her song "Orange Skies" to their series of tracks with NATURE as a featured artist, allowing royalties to be delivered to climate conservation projects. The campaign won the Cannes Lions Innovation Grand Prix.

On May 8, 2026, she released her third studio album, Fig Tree. It was promoted with multi-date residencies in New York City and Los Angeles where she performed the new record surrounded by visual artwork it inspired. A single from the album, "All For A Man," was performed on The Kelly Clarkson Show.

== Filmography ==
=== Television ===
Year	Title	Role	Notes
2015	Wet Hot American Summer: First Day of Camp	Lisa	Episode: "Auditions"
2019	The Morning Show	Vocalist	Episode: "A Seat at the Table"
2022	Dollface	Herself	Episode: "Molly"

=== Short films ===
Year	Title	Role	Notes
2026	Counterpoint	TBA	

== Concert tours ==
Opening act

- Maroon 5 – Overexposed Tour (2013)
- Maroon 5 and Kelly Clarkson – 2013 Honda Civic Tour (2013)
- Gavin DeGraw – Make a Move Tour (2014)
- Maroon 5 – Maroon V Tour (2015)
- Owl City – On the Verge Tour (2015)
- Betty Who – Betty: The Tour (2019)
- Lukas Graham - US 2024 (2024)

== Discography ==
=== Albums ===
- Bad Together (2018)
- Berry (Deluxe) (2023)
- Fig Tree (2026)

=== EPs ===
- Space (2015)
- Time (2015)
- Hymn for Tomorrow (2021)
- Berry (2022)
- Live From Home (2023)

=== Singles ===
- "Crazy Ass Bitch" (Remix) featuring Kendrick Lamar (2014)
- "Psycho" (Remix) featuring Pusha T (2015)
- "Never Over You" (2018)
- "Uphill Battle" (2018)
- "Joshua Tree" (2018)
- "Lose Us" featuring Scott Hoying (2018)
- "Best Friend Song" (2020)
- "Orange Skies" (2020)
- "Hymn For Tomorrow" (2021)
- "I Can't Go To The Party" (2021)
- "June" (2021)
- "Mad Man" (2021)
- "fflow" (2022)
- "Fig Tree" (2025)
- "Hold Tight" (2025)
- "Good News" (2026)
- "All For A Man" (2026)

=== Songwriting credits ===
- "Collect My Love (feat. Alex Newell)" by The Knocks (2016)
- "Love Songs" by Daryl Braithwaite (2020)
- "Brooklyn Cowboy" by Gashi (2025)
- "Hallelujah (I Don't Think About You)" by Kevin Olusola (2025)

=== Music videos ===
List of music videos, showing year released and directors
Title	Year	Director(s)
"Psycho" (Remix) featuring Pusha T	2015	Aya Tanimura
"Joshua Tree"	2018	Nick Leopold
"Lose Us" featuring Scott Hoying	2018	—N/a
"Bad Together"	2019	—N/a
"Hymn For Tomorrow"	2021	Nick Egan
"I Can't Go To The Party"	2021	N/A
"Mad Man"	2021	Joe Nankin
"fflow"	2022	Lili Peper
"Fig Tree"	2025	Lucy Tamarkin
"Hold Tight"	2025	Lucy Tamarkin
"Good News"	2026	Lucy Tamarkin
"All For A Man"	2026	Lucy Tamarkin
"Edge Of Something Else"	2026	Lucy Tamarkin
