= Maps (Maroon 5 song) =

2014 song by Maroon 5

Single by Maroon 5

from the album V
- Released: June 16, 2014
- Studio: Conway; Record Plant (Los Angeles, CA); Patriot Studios (Denver, CO); Matzah Ball Studios (New York, NY)
- Genre: Pop rock; reggae
- Length: 3:09
- Label: 222; Interscope
- Songwriters: Adam Levine; Ammar Malik; Benjamin Levin; Noel Zancanella; Ryan Tedder
- Producers: Ryan Tedder; Noel Zancanella; Benny Blanco

Maroon 5 singles chronology
| "Love Somebody" (2013) | "Maps" (2014) | "Animals" (2014) |

Music video
- "Maps" on YouTube

"Maps" is a song by the American rock band Maroon 5. The song was released on June 16, 2014, as the lead single from their fifth studio album V (2014). The song was written by Adam Levine, Ammar Malik, Benjamin Levin, Noel Zancanella and Ryan Tedder, and produced by the latter three. It was also their first single after the return of keyboardist and rhythm guitarist Jesse Carmichael. "Maps" received mainly positive reviews from music critics, with praise going to the song's melody and chilled-out vibe. However, some criticized the song for being similar to their previous lead single "Payphone", on their last album Overexposed (2012).

The song was a commercial success, reaching number-one in Canada and peaking at number six on the Billboard Hot 100 and number two on the UK Singles Chart. The song also reached the top 20 in over 25 countries, including France, Germany and Denmark. On July 1, 2014, a music video for the song premiered on MTV and VH1. It was inspired by the film Irréversible and shows the events that occur in the video in reverse. In August 2014, "Maps" was named Battle of the Summer Jams for 2014 by VH1.

The remix versions of the song are performed by featured artists, American rapper Big Sean and Colombian singer J Balvin. Another remix version was made by Circuit Jerks and was included on their EP titled EP1 (2016). The band has performed the song multiple times including the Maroon V Tour (2015–2018), as well as the 2014 MTV Video Music Awards and The Today Show. The song was used in the advertisement for the 2013 film Begin Again, which stars Levine. It was featured on the television shows Shameless and State of Affairs and the video games Just Dance 2015, Rock Band VR and Fuser.

== Composition ==
"Maps" (2014)
A 19-second sample of "Maps"

The song was written by Adam Levine, Ammar Malik, Ryan Tedder, Benny Blanco and Noel Zancanella, and produced by the latter three. Blanco and Malik have previously teamed with Maroon 5 on the songs "Moves like Jagger" and "Payphone", while Tedder and Zancanella have worked with the group on the songs "Love Somebody" and "Lucky Strike". "Maps" is an up-tempo pop rock and the Police-esque reggae track, that contains a "breezy guitar lick". It marks Maroon 5's further departure from the funkier sound for which the band was originally known.

Lyrically, the song is about "the search for love, particularly a love that has been lost and needs to be found". In the chorus, Levine sings "All the roads you took came back to me / So I'm following the map that leads to you."

== Critical reception ==
Idolator's Robbie Daw wrote that "similar to Bruno Mars' 'Locked Out Of Heaven' ", "Maps" has a "Sting/The Police vibe, particularly with the guitar licks and Levine's multi-tracked vocal harmonies on the chorus." He also added that the influence of Ryan Tedder (and OneRepublic's pop-rock anthems, such as "Counting Stars" and "Love Runs Out") is evident. Jeff Benjamin of Fuse compared the opening guitar licks to the "California-cool sound" of Red Hot Chili Peppers.

Music Times commented, "With his [Levine's] singsong melody over the relaxed, plucked guitars and subtle drums, Maroon 5 create a chill vibe before building the song into something a bit more powerful. Though Levine's vocals remain constant, the song soon crescendos into a fuller sound, with a chorus that isn't so much explosive as it is, well, danceable," and compared the track to "Payphone", the lead single from the band's fourth studio album Overexposed (2012): "The more you think about the two lead singles versus each other, the more they feel exactly the same."

== Commercial performance ==
Shortly after its release, "Maps" quickly reached number one on the Billboard Twitter Real Time Trending 140 chart, eventually staying within the upper ranks for several hours. The song also logged close to 1,800 first-day spins on radio which, according to the Nielsen BDS, would amount to a one-day audience impression of seventeen million. It has since peaked at number six on the Billboard Hot 100. It reached its million sales mark in August 2014 and had sold 1.6 million copies by the year's end.

The single debuted at number two on the UK Singles Chart in late August 2014.

As "Maps" topped the eight biggest music charts in South Korea, Maroon 5 became the first foreign artist to top several charts at the same time in Korean music history.

== Music videos ==
=== Official music video ===
The music video for "Maps" was directed by Peter Berg and cinematographed by Tobias A. Schliessler. It premiered on MTV and VH1 on July 1, 2014, and on Vevo, the day after. According to the band's bassist Mickey Madden, the story from the video is inspired by the 2002 film Irréversible, so the events shown in the video are reversed. "Maps" also marks the first music video appearance in two years of keyboardist and rhythm guitarist Jesse Carmichael, who returned after taking a temporary break from performing with the band. He plays one of the hospital paramedics in some of the first scenes of the video. The other members of the group: the aforementioned Mickey Madden, guitarist James Valentine, keyboardist PJ Morton and drummer Matt Flynn are portraying some of the guests seen at a house party and the band's assistant manager Shawn Tellez, who plays a partygoer.

==== Synopsis ====
The video begins when a worried Adam Levine enters a hospital and searches the emergency room until he finds a young woman, revealed to be his girlfriend (Tereza Kacerova), as the paramedics attempt to resuscitate her; but he is ushered out. The video follows while the woman walks into a street in tears heartbreakingly as a man tries to get her attention and she pushes him away, before she is hit by a truck. In the next scene, Levine and his girlfriend arrive at the house in a party and are greeted by guests. While the crowd was having fun, Levine has drinks with his friends, becomes intoxicated and meets a woman (Meghan Wiggins) and they share a kiss. However, his girlfriend notices them and she leaves, despite Levine's attempts to stop her. In another scene, Levine is helping his girlfriend choose which dress to wear and they watch a football (soccer) game on television together and then the camera fastly turn back into the beginning. During the final scene at the hospital, the girl is shown flatlining, depicting that she died from the accident.

=== Rumba Whoa video ===
A music video for the song's remix version performed by Rumba Whoa featuring Colombian singer J Balvin was released on October 15, 2014. It follows two teams: Rumba Whoa FC and DJ's United, complete in a game of football (soccer). Levine and Kacerova appeared in archive footage from the song's music video, as they watch the game on television.

== Live performances ==
Maroon 5 performed "Maps" for the first time on June 20, 2014, during their concert at the Bowery Ballroom in New York City, as part of the American Express' EveryDay Live. The following day, they also performed the single at another concert in Laval, Canada. The band played the song for The Today Show on June 25, at Rockefeller Plaza in New York, and again on September 1, 2014, the day before the world premiere of their album V. On August 10, 2014, Maroon 5 performed the song at the Hyundai Card City Break concert in Seoul, South Korea.

The band also played "Maps" at the 2014 MTV Video Music Awards (along with "One More Night") on August 24 and the iHeartRadio Theater in Burbank, California, on August 26, 2014. On September 11, 2014, Maroon 5 played an acoustic version of "Maps" for BBC Radio 1's Live Lounge. Later the same day, they performed the song during the 2014 iTunes Festival at the Roundhouse in London, England. Maroon 5 have also performed "Maps" during their appearances on America's Got Talent, The Tonight Show Starring Jimmy Fallon, The Ellen DeGeneres Show, Saturday Night Live and Sunday Night at the Palladium.

== Awards and nominations ==
| Year | Ceremony | Category | Result | Ref. |
|---|---|---|---|---|
| 2014 | Teen Choice Awards | Choice Rock Song | Nominated | |
| 2014 | Vevo Hot This Year | Best Duo or Group Video | Nominated | |
| 2015 | BMI Pop Awards | Award Winning Song | Won | |
| 2015 | BMI Pop Awards | Songwriter of the Year | Won | |
| 2015 | People's Choice Awards | Favorite Song | Nominated | |

== Track listing ==
Digital download

1. "Maps" – 3:09

Digital download – Circuit Jerks Remix

1. "Maps" (Circuit Jerks Remix) – 7:14

Digital download – Papercha$er Remix

1. "Maps" (Papercha$er Remix) – 4:54

Digital download – Reflex Remix

1. "Maps" (Reflex Remix) (featuring Big Sean) – 3:51

Digital download – Rumba Whoa Remix

1. "Maps" (Rumba Whoa Remix) (featuring J Balvin) – 4:13

Digital download – Slaptop Remix

1. "Maps" (Slaptop Remix) – 4:04

Digital download – Will Sparks Remix

1. "Maps" (Will Sparks Remix) – 4:32

== Credit and personnel ==
Maroon 5

- Adam Levine – lead vocals, songwriting
- Jesse Carmichael – keyboards, synthesizers, rhythm guitar, backing vocals
- Mickey Madden – bass guitar
- James Valentine – lead guitar, backing vocals
- Matt Flynn – drums, percussion
- PJ Morton – keyboards, synthesizers, backing vocals

Other personnel

- Ryan Tedder – production, songwriting
- Benny Blanco – production, songwriting
- Noel Zancanella – production, songwriting
- Ammar Malik – songwriting
- Sam Schamberg, Jason Fields, Travis Leete and Shawn Tellez – additional handclaps and vocals

== Charts ==
=== Weekly charts ===
Weekly chart performance for "Maps"
| Chart (2014–2015) | Peak position |
|---|---|
| Australia (ARIA) | 30 |
| Austria (Ö3 Austria Top 40) | 18 |
| Belgium (Ultratop 50 Flanders) | 30 |
| Belgium (Ultratop 50 Wallonia) | 13 |
| Canada Hot 100 (Billboard) | 1 |
| Canada AC (Billboard) | 1 |
| Canada CHR/Top 40 (Billboard) | 2 |
| Canada Hot AC (Billboard) | 1 |
| CIS Airplay (TopHit) | 28 |
| Czech Republic Airplay (ČNS IFPI) | 28 |
| Czech Republic Singles Digital (ČNS IFPI) | 10 |
| Denmark (Tracklisten) | 12 |
| Euro Digital Song Sales (Billboard) | 4 |
| Finland (Suomen virallinen lista) | 5 |
| France (SNEP) | 17 |
| Germany (GfK) | 6 |
| Hungary (Single Top 40) | 11 |
| Hungary (Stream Top 40) | 3 |
| Ireland (IRMA) | 22 |
| Israel International Airplay (Media Forest) | 8 |
| Italy (FIMI) | 4 |
| Italian Airplay (EarOne) | 5 |
| Japan Hot 100 (Billboard) | 16 |
| Lebanon (OLT20) | 3 |
| Luxembourg Digital Song Sales (Billboard) | 4 |
| Mexico (Billboard Mexican Airplay) | 5 |
| Mexico Anglo (Monitor Latino) | 5 |
| Netherlands (Dutch Top 40) | 14 |
| Netherlands (Single Top 100) | 24 |
| New Zealand (Recorded Music NZ) | 16 |
| Norway (VG-lista) | 11 |
| Poland (Polish Airplay New) | 2 |
| Russia Airplay (TopHit) | 38 |
| Scottish Singles Sales (Official Charts) | 2 |
| Slovakia Airplay (ČNS IFPI) | 12 |
| Slovakia Singles Digital (ČNS IFPI) | 8 |
| Slovenia (SloTop50) | 15 |
| South Africa Airplay (EMA) | 3 |
| South Korea (Gaon) | 2 |
| Spain (Promusicae) | 22 |
| Sweden (Sverigetopplistan) | 8 |
| Switzerland (Schweizer Hitparade) | 22 |
| UK Singles (Official Charts) | 2 |
| Ukraine Airplay (TopHit) | 12 |
| US Billboard Hot 100 | 6 |
| US Adult Contemporary (Billboard) | 1 |
| US Adult Pop Airplay (Billboard) | 1 |
| US Dance Airplay (Billboard) | 13 |
| US Pop Airplay (Billboard) | 2 |
| US Rhythmic Airplay (Billboard) | 31 |

=== Year-end charts ===
Annual chart rankings for "Maps"
| Chart (2014) | Position |
|---|---|
| Belgium (Ultratop Wallonia) | 97 |
| Canada (Canadian Hot 100) | 23 |
| Denmark (Tracklisten) | 26 |
| France (SNEP) | 127 |
| Germany (Official German Charts) | 70 |
| Hungary (Single Top 40) | 81 |
| Italy (FIMI) | 24 |
| Japan (Japan Hot 100) | 81 |
| Japan Adult Contemporary (Billboard) | 6 |
| Netherlands (Dutch Top 40) | 79 |
| Netherlands (Single Top 100) | 66 |
| Russia Airplay (TopHit) | 165 |
| Sweden (Sverigetopplistan) | 50 |
| UK Singles (Official Charts Company) | 75 |
| Ukraine Airplay (TopHit) | 58 |
| US Billboard Hot 100 | 29 |
| US Adult Contemporary (Billboard) | 18 |
| US Adult Top 40 (Billboard) | 8 |
| US Mainstream Top 40 (Billboard) | 22 |
| Chart (2015) | Position |
| Spain (PROMUSICAE) | 97 |
| US Adult Contemporary (Billboard) | 17 |

== Certifications and sales ==
| Region | Certification | Certified units/sales |
|---|---|---|
| Australia (ARIA) | 5× Platinum | 350,000^{‡} |
| Brazil (Pro-Música Brasil) | 2× Diamond | 500,000^{‡} |
| Canada (Music Canada) | 2× Platinum | 160,000^{*} |
| Germany (BVMI) | Platinum | 400,000^{‡} |
| Italy (FIMI) | 2× Platinum | 60,000^{‡} |
| Japan (RIAJ) | Gold | 100,000^{*} |
| Mexico (AMPROFON) | Platinum | 60,000^{*} |
| New Zealand (RMNZ) | 4× Platinum | 120,000^{‡} |
| South Korea | — | 2,500,000 |
| Spain (Promusicae) | 3× Platinum | 180,000^{‡} |
| Sweden (GLF) | 2× Platinum | 80,000^{‡} |
| United Kingdom (BPI) | 2× Platinum | 1,200,000^{‡} |
| United States (RIAA) | 4× Platinum | 1,600,000 |
Streaming
| Denmark (IFPI Danmark) | Platinum | 2,600,000^{†} |
| Japan (RIAJ) | Gold | 50,000,000^{†} |
| South Korea | — | 100,000,000 |
| Spain (Promusicae) | Platinum | 8,000,000^{†} |
^{*} Sales figures based on certification alone.^{‡} Sales+streaming figures based on certification alone.^{†} Streaming-only figures based on certification alone.

== Release history ==
| Region | Date | Format | Version | Label(s) | Ref. |
|---|---|---|---|---|---|
| Italy | June 16, 2014 | Contemporary hit radio | Original | Interscope | |
| United States | June 17, 2014 | Contemporary hit radio | Original | 222; Interscope | |
| United States | June 17, 2014 | Digital download | Original | 222; Interscope | |
| Germany | August 1, 2014 | CD | Original | Universal | |
| United States | August 5, 2014 | Rhythmic contemporary radio | Original | 222; Interscope | |
| United States | August 14, 2014 | Digital download | Reflex Remix | 222; Interscope | |
| United Kingdom | August 24, 2014 | Digital download | Original | Polydor | |
| Various | September 23, 2014 | Digital download | Rumba Whoa Remix | 222; Interscope | |
| Various | September 9, 2016 | Digital download | Circuit Jerks Remix | 222; Interscope | |

== See also ==
- List of number-one adult contemporary singles of 2015 (U.S.)
