= The Fourth World (album) =

Studio album by Kara's Flowers
- Released: August 19, 1997
- Genres: Alternative rock; power pop; pop-punk
- Length: 39:30
- Label: Reprise
- Producer: Rob Cavallo

Kara's Flowers chronology
...We Like Digging? (1994)	The Fourth World (1997)	Stagg Street Recordings (1999)

Alternative cover
- Japanese cover

Singles from The Fourth World
- 1. "Soap Disco" Released: July 22, 1997

The Fourth World is the only studio album and major label debut by the band Kara's Flowers, who later became Maroon 5. The album contains 11 tracks, plus one bonus track on the Japanese edition.

Following their 1994 self-released demo album ...We Like Digging?, Kara's Flowers signed with Reprise Records, teamed up with the people who worked with Green Day and released The Fourth World on August 19, 1997. The band had little success with the album and parted with the record label two years later. They continued to explore different musical styles until finally coming together again with James Valentine under the name Maroon 5.

The album was re-released on CD in 2004 with an added message from the band. "Here is a good example of how much we changed over the course of five years. This is the album we made in high school, before James joined the band, before we became Maroon 5. To paraphrase Monty Python, 'Get Ready for something completely different'."

== Critical reception ==
Professional ratings
Review scores
Source	Rating
AllMusic	4/5 stars
Entertainment Weekly	B+
Pitchfork	3.5/10

Giving the album a B+, Tom Lanham with Entertainment Weekly said the "optimistic, lyrically awkward kids spend 10 more happy tracks turning the tables on lethargic slacker cynicism, with Green Day producer Rob Cavallo bridling all that youthful zeal."

== Track listing ==
All lyrics are written by Adam Levine; all music is composed by Levine, except where noted.

Standard edition
No.	Title	Music	Length
1.	"Soap Disco"		2:40
2.	"Future Kid"		4:44
3.	"Myself"		3:05
4.	"Oliver"		2:38
5.	"The Never Saga"	Levine, Carmichael	3:58
6.	"Loving the Small Time"		3:32
7.	"To Her, with Love"	Levine, Carmichael	2:52
8.	"Sleepy Windbreaker"	Levine, Carmichael	3:05
9.	"Pantry Queen"	Levine, Carmichael, Mickey Madden, Ryan Dusick	3:46
10.	"My Ocean Blue"		3:11
11.	"Captain Splendid"	Levine, Carmichael	5:59
Total length:			39:30

Japanese edition bonus track
No.	Title	Music	Length
12.	"Buddy "Two Shoes" Wilson"	Levine, Carmichael	2:29
Total length:			41:59

== Personnel ==
All credits for The Fourth World are adapted from the album's liner notes.

Kara's Flowers

- Adam Levine – lead vocals, lead guitar
- Jesse Carmichael – rhythm guitar, backing vocals
- Mickey Madden – bass
- Ryan Dusick – drums, percussion

Additional musicians

- Roger Joseph Manning, Jr. – keyboards
- David Campbell – string and horn arrangements

Production

- Rob Cavallo – producer
- Jerry Finn – mixing, engineer
- Ken Allardyce – engineer
- Steve Holroyd – engineer
- Mark Agostino – second engineer
- Billy Bowers – second engineer
- Tony Flores – second engineer
- Barry Goldberg – second engineer
- Brandon Harris – second engineer
- Billy Kinsley – second engineer
- John Srebalus – second engineer
- Mike "Micro" Shaw – guitar tech
- Adam Day – guitar tech
- Bob Ludwig – mastering

Design

- Katherine Delaney – layout
- Kara's Flowers – layout
- Noah Gershman – photography

== Release history ==
Release history for The Fourth World
Region	Date	Edition	Format	Label	Ref.
United States	August 19, 1997	Standard	CD	Reprise	
Japan	October 5, 1997	Standard	CD	WEA Japan	
United States	May 25, 2004	Reissue	CD	Rhino Entertainment	
Various	January 24, 2020	Limited	Vinyl	Music on Vinyl	
