= Feelings (Maroon 5 song) =

Single by Maroon 5

from the album V
- Released: September 14, 2015
- Recorded: 2013–2014
- Studio: Conway Recording Studios, Hollywood; The Mothership, Sherman Oaks
- Genre: Dance-pop; disco
- Length: 3:15
- Label: 222; Interscope
- Songwriters: Adam Levine; Shellback; Oscar Görres
- Producers: Shellback; OzGo

Maroon 5 singles chronology
"This Summer's Gonna Hurt like a Motherfucker" (2015)	"Feelings" (2015)	"Don't Wanna Know" (2016)

"Feelings" is a song by the American rock band Maroon 5 from their fifth studio album V (2014). It was written by Adam Levine, Shellback, and Oscar Görres and produced by the latter two. It was sent to U.S. Adult Contemporary and contemporary hit radio on September 14 and 15, respectively, as the fifth and final single from the album. The official artwork for the single was unveiled by Maroon 5's official Twitter account on October 6, 2015. Although a music video for the track was recorded at the Playboy Mansion, its release was scrapped.

== Background ==
The song appeared on the band's fifth studio album V, which was released in August 2014. "Feelings" was announced as the fifth single of the album in July 2015. It was sent to US Adult Contemporary radio on September 14, 2015 and to US Mainstream radio the following day. The official artwork for the single shows a woman's legs and debuted online on October 6, 2015.

== Composition ==
"Feelings" is written in the key of E♭ minor with a tempo of 122 beats per minute. Levine's vocals span from B♭_{2} to G♭_{5} in the song.

== Charts ==
Weekly chart performance for "Feelings"
Chart (2015)	Peak position
Belgium (Ultratip Bubbling Under Wallonia)	5
Canada AC (Billboard)	48
Canada CHR/Top 40 (Billboard)	42
Canada Hot AC (Billboard)	44
CIS Airplay (TopHit)	104
Guatemala Airplay (Monitor Latino)	10
Italian Airplay (EarOne)	81
Mexico Ingles Airplay (Billboard)	47
South Korea International Chart (Gaon)	10
US Bubbling Under Hot 100 (Billboard)	8
US Adult Contemporary (Billboard)	29
US Adult Pop Airplay (Billboard)	16
US Pop Airplay (Billboard)	29
Venezuela Pop General (Record Report)	42
Venezuela Top Anglo (Record Report)	27

== Release history ==
Release dates for "Feelings"
Region	Date	Format(s)	Label(s)	Ref.
United States	September 14, 2015	Hot adult contemporary radio	222; Interscope	
United States	September 15, 2015	Contemporary hit radio	222; Interscope	
Italy	October 16, 2015	Contemporary hit radio	Universal	
