= Soap Disco =

Single by Kara's Flowers

from the album The Fourth World
- B-side: "Captain Splendid"
- Released: July 22, 1997
- Genre: Pop-punk; power pop; alternative rock
- Length: 2:40
- Label: Reprise
- Composer: Adam Levine
- Lyricist: Adam Levine
- Producer: Rob Cavallo

Kara's Flowers singles chronology
"Soap Disco" (1997)	"Harder to Breathe" (2002)

Music video
- "Soap Disco" on Vimeo

"Soap Disco" is the debut single by American alternative rock band Kara's Flowers, who later became Maroon 5, released on July 22, 1997, by Reprise Records as the lead single from their first (and only) album, The Fourth World. Unlike the pop-soul sound of Maroon 5, this track features a mix of pop-punk, power pop and alternative rock, influenced by Britpop, drawing comparisons to Blink-182. Despite high expectations from the band and record company, the album failed to catch on and "Soap Disco", was a failure, eventually leading the band to part ways with their label and re-emerge years later as Maroon 5. The band made an appearance from the television series Beverly Hills, 90210, where they performed the song in the episode "Forgive and Forget".

== Track listing ==
Europe CD maxi-single
No.	Title	Writer(s)	Length
1.	"Soap Disco"	Adam Levine	2:40
2.	"Captain Splendid"	Levine, Jesse Carmichael	5:59
3.	"Yesterday When I Was Handsome"	Ryan Dusick, Josh Dusick, Levine	3:52
4.	"Buddy "Two Shoes" Wilson"	Levine, Carmichael	2:28

== Personnel ==
Credits are adapted from the The Fourth World's liner notes.

- Adam Levine – lead vocals, lead guitar
- Jesse Carmichael – rhythm guitar, backing vocals
- Mickey Madden – bass
- Ryan Dusick – drums, percussion

== Music video ==
A music video was produced for the single, depicting the group walking through a park and performing in an orange and green room. A storm appears at the end of the video. The video was directed by Mark Kohr, who has directed music videos for Alanis Morissette and Green Day. The video made airplay on 120 Minutes. The song was included in Volume 50 of CMJ New Music Monthly.
