= Matt Flynn (musician) =

American musician (born 1970)

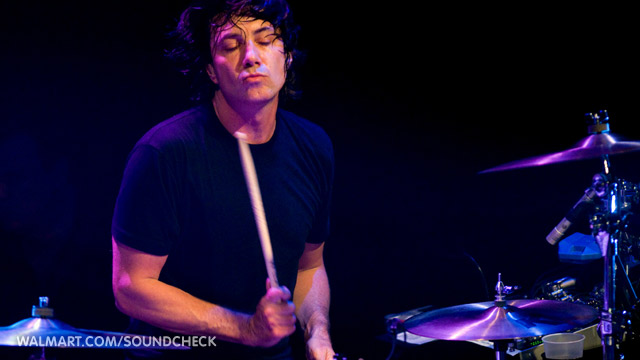
- Flynn in 2010

Background information
- Born: Matthew Flynn; May 23, 1970 (age 56); Woodstock, New York, U.S.
- Genres: Alternative rock; pop rock; funk rock; blue-eyed soul
- Occupations: Musician; record producer
- Instruments: Drums; percussion
- Years active: 1998–present
- Labels: 222; Interscope; A&M/Octone Records
- Member of: Maroon 5
- Spouse: Heidi Ford

Matthew Flynn (born May 23, 1970) is an American musician and record producer. He is the drummer for the Pop rock band Maroon 5. In 2006, after being the band's touring drummer for two years, Flynn officially replaced the original drummer of Maroon 5, Ryan Dusick, who left the group due to serious wrist and shoulder injuries sustained from constant touring after the release of their first album, Songs About Jane in 2002.

Prior to joining Maroon 5, Flynn has played drums for The B-52's, Gavin DeGraw and Gandhi.

== Early life ==
Matt Flynn was born in Woodstock, New York. When he was 14 years old, Flynn picked up his first pair of drumsticks in his father's basement and immediately started drumming the beat to "Jump" by Van Halen, impressing his father greatly. His mother was a piano teacher and his father worked at IBM. Later that year he came third in his high school talent show, behind stand up comedian Daniel Tosh and a dance crew known as "Tropic Lightning".

Flynn graduated from Gunn High School and briefly attended San Diego State University.

== Career ==
Matt Flynn began his professional drumming career in the late 1990s, initially working as a drum technician while performing with various bands at New York City clubs such as Arlene’s Grocery. He later worked as a drum technician for The B-52's, during which he occasionally performed as a fill-in drummer while touring when regular members were unavailable due to other commitments.

Flynn has contributed as a session drummer across multiple genres. He played drums on Gavin DeGraw’s 2009 album Free on the track “Waterfall,” performed on several tracks from State Radio’s 2006 album Us Against the Crown, including “Right Me Up,” “Riddle in Londontown,” and “Wait for Me,” and contributed to select tracks on K’naan’s 2009 major-label debut Troubadour, including “If Rap Gets Jealous” and “Fire in Freetown.”

He joined Maroon 5 as a touring drummer in 2004 during the promotion of Songs About Jane, supporting live performances but not appearing on the album’s studio recordings. He became an official member in 2006 and has since contributed drums and percussion to all subsequent studio releases.

Matt Flynn performed drums on "Sunshine" a song by Liam Payne from the 2021 animated film Ron's Gone Wrong soundtrack.

In 2024, Flynn participated in recording sessions for Farmer’s self-titled debut album at Avast! Studio in Seattle alongside musicians including Tim Lefebvre, Mark Guiliana, and Dave Matthews. The album was released on March 29.

In October 2025, Flynn temporarily withdrew from Maroon 5’s tour following emergency surgery, with Nate Morton filling in on drums during his absence. He later recovered and rejoined the band for subsequent performances in November 2025.

== Personal life ==
Flynn is married to Heidi Ford, who has a fraternal twin named Kelly Ford. On June 5, 2007, Flynn's wife gave birth to their second child, named Michael Ford Flynn. His elder daughter is named Ryan.

Flynn maintains a private personal life and does not have publicly active social media accounts.

Outside of his music career, he is interested in golf and has participated in celebrity pro-am events, including the JM Eagle LA Championship.. He has also mentioned the film Piranha 3D among his favorite movies in a fan Q&A interview.

== Gear ==
Over the years, Flynn has played Yamaha and Ludwig drums, as well as Sabian and Zildjian cymbals, among other brands. He currently endorses Sugar Percussion (since 2015), Paiste cymbals (since 2014), Remo drumheads and Vater drumsticks. He has also used Roland pads and triggers.

== Discography ==
=== Maroon 5 ===
As a touring member

- Live – Friday the 13th (2005)

As an official member

- It Won't Be Soon Before Long (2007)
- Hands All Over (2010)
- Overexposed (2012)
- V (2014)
- Red Pill Blues (2017)
- Jordi (2021)
- Love Is Like (2025)

Other albums or songs, on which Flynn has played

- Botanica – Botanica vs. the Truth Fish (2005) ("Good")
- State Radio – Us Against the Crown (2006)
- Gavin DeGraw – Free (2009)
- K'naan – Troubadour (2009)
- The Skypilot – Skypilot (EP) (2012)
- Hi-Burns – Night Moves (2015)
- Daniel Davies – Signals (2020)
- Liam Payne – Ron's Gone Wrong (Original Motion Picture Soundtrack) (2021) ("Sunshine")
- Farmer – The Color That Suits You (2024)

== Sources ==
- Maroon 5 Band website, “Band Bios" https://web.archive.org/web/20120206030006/http://www.maroon5.com/lo_fi/bio.html May, 2007
- Yamaha website, Sitting in with Maroon5, September 2004
