= 222 Records =

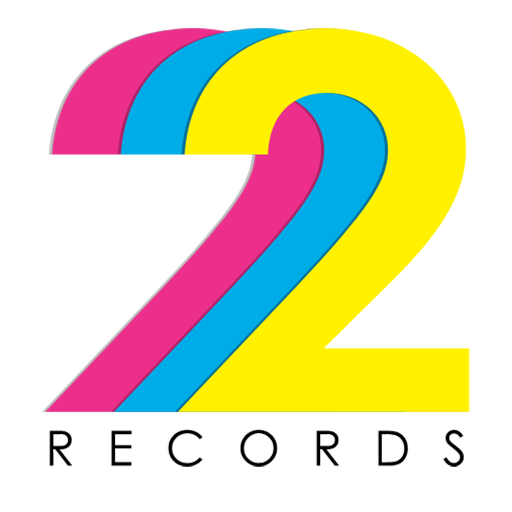
- Parent company: Universal Music Group
- Founded: February 9, 2012; 14 years ago
- Founder: Adam Levine
- Distributors: Interscope Records; Universal Music Group (Worldwide)
- Country of origin: United States
- Official website: 222recs.com

222 Records is an American record label founded in 2012 by artist Adam Levine, frontman of American band Maroon 5, which in 2014, signed to the label. 222 Records is distributed by Interscope Records.

== Artists ==
=== Current ===
- Maroon 5 (2014–present)
- Circuit Jerks (2014–present)
- Polly A (2015–present)

=== Former ===
- Matthew Morrison (2012–2013)
- Tony Lucca (2012–2013)
- Rozzi Crane (2012–2016)
- Joe Pesci (2019)

== Discography ==
=== Albums ===
- Where It All Began – Matthew Morrison (2013)
- With the Whole World Watching – Tony Lucca (2013)
- Begin Again – Various Artists (2014)
- V – Maroon 5 (2014)
- Singles – Maroon 5 (2015)
- Red Pill Blues – Maroon 5 (2017)
- Pesci... Still Singing – Joe Pesci (2019)
- Jordi – Maroon 5 (2021)
- Love Is Like – Maroon 5 (2025)
- The Singles Collection – Maroon 5 (2025)

=== Extended plays ===
- A Classic Christmas – Matthew Morrison (2013)
- Rozzi Crane – Rozzi Crane (2013)
- Space – Rozzi Crane (2015)
- Time — Rozzi Crane (2015)
- Ghetto Gold Dream – Polly A (2016)
- EP1 – Circuit Jerks (2016)
- Will Be Loved – Maroon 5 (2025)
