= Palm Trees & Power Lines Tour =

2010 concert tour by Maroon 5

- Tour by Maroon 5
- Location: North America
- Associated album: Hands All Over
- Start date: July 27, 2010
- End date: October 29, 2010
- Legs: 2
- No. of shows: 39

Maroon 5 concert chronology
- It Won't Be Soon Before Long Tour (2007–2008); Palm Trees & Power Lines Tour (2010); Hands All Over Tour (2011–2012)

The Palm Trees & Power Lines Tour was the fifth concert tour by American pop rock band Maroon 5, launched in support of the third album Hands All Over (2010). The tour began on July 27, 2010 in New York City and concluded on October 29, 2010 in Mahnomen, Minnesota, comprising 39 concerts.

== Opening acts ==
- Ry Cuming (Legs 1 & 2; select dates)
- OneRepublic (Leg 2; select dates)
- Bruno Mars & the Hooligans (Leg 2; select dates)
- Jason Segel (Leg 2; one show)
- Janelle Monáe (Leg 1; one show)
- Guster (Leg 1; select dates)
- Owl City (Leg 1; select dates)
- VV Brown (Leg 1; select dates)
- Kris Allen (Leg 1; select dates)
- Miggs (Leg 1; one show)

== Setlist ==
1. "Misery"
2. "If I Never See Your Face Again"
3. "Harder to Breathe"
4. "Give a Little More"
5. "Roxanne" (The Police cover) / "The Sun"
6. "Won't Go Home Without You"
7. "Never Gonna Leave This Bed"
8. "Secret" / "What's Love Got to Do with It" (Tina Turner cover)
9. "Wake Up Call"
10. "Let's Stay Together" (Al Green cover) / "She Will Be Loved"
11. "Shiver"
12. "Stutter"
13. "Makes Me Wonder"
14. "This Love"

Encore

15. "Sunday Morning"
16. "Hands All Over"

== Shows ==
List of concerts, showing date, city, country, venue and opening acts
Date	City	Country	Venue	Opening acts
2010
Leg 1
July 27	New York	United States	Beacon Theatre	—
July 30	Saratoga Springs	United States	Saratoga Performing Arts Center	Guster; Ry Cuming
July 31 (Note: The concert on July 31, 2010 in Gilford at Meadowbrook U.S. Cellular Pavilion was part of the 2010 Eastern Propane Concert Series.)	Gilford	United States	Meadowbrook U.S. Cellular Pavilion	Guster; Ry Cuming
August 1	Uncasville	United States	Mohegan Sun Arena	Guster; Ry Cuming
August 2 (Note: The concert on August 2, 2010 in Boston at Bank of America Pavilion was part of the Mix 104.4 MixFest 2010.)	Boston	United States	Bank of America Pavilion	—
August 4	Toronto	Canada	Molson Canadian Amphitheatre	Owl City; Ry Cuming
August 5	Clarkston	United States	DTE Energy Music Theatre	Owl City; VV Brown
August 7	Canandaigua	United States	Constellation Brands – Marvin Sands Performing Arts Center	Owl City; VV Brown
August 9	Boston	United States	Bank of America Pavilion	Janelle Monáe; Owl City; VV Brown
August 11	Wantagh	United States	Jones Beach Theater	Owl City; VV Brown
August 13	Bristow	United States	Jiffy Lube Live	Owl City; VV Brown
August 14	Camden	United States	Susquehanna Bank Center	Owl City; VV Brown
August 15	Holmdel	United States	PNC Bank Arts Center	Owl City; VV Brown
August 17	Raleigh	United States	Raleigh Amphitheater	Kris Allen; VV Brown
August 19	Miami	United States	Bayfront Amphitheater	Kris Allen; VV Brown
August 21	Alpharetta	United States	Verizon Wireless Amphitheatre	Kris Allen; VV Brown
August 23 (Note: The concert on August 23, 2010 in Morgantown at Mountainlair Plaza was part of the 2010 WVU Fallfest.)	Morgantown	United States	Mountainlair Plaza	—
August 24	Davidson	United States	Davidson College	Kris Allen; VV Brown
August 26	Chattanooga	United States	McKenzie Arena	Kris Allen; VV Brown
August 27	Memphis	United States	Mud Island Amphitheater	Kris Allen; VV Brown
August 28	Lexington	United States	Applebee's Park	Kris Allen; VV Brown; Miggs
August 29	Pittsburgh	United States	Trib Total Media Amphitheatre	Kris Allen; VV Brown
August 31	Dayton	United States	Fraze Pavilion	Kris Allen; VV Brown; Miggs
September 1	Indianapolis	United States	Murat Theatre	VV Brown
Leg 2
October 6	Santa Barbara	United States	Santa Barbara Bowl	OneRepublic; Ry Cuming; Bruno Mars & the Hooligans
October 8	Los Angeles	United States	The Greek Theatre	OneRepublic; Ry Cuming; Bruno Mars & the Hooligans
October 9	Los Angeles	United States	The Greek Theatre	OneRepublic; Ry Cuming; Jason Segel
October 10	Berkeley	United States	William Randolph Hearst Greek Theatre	OneRepublic; Ry Cuming; Bruno Mars & the Hooligans
October 12	Tacoma	United States	Tacoma Dome	OneRepublic; Ry Cuming; Bruno Mars & the Hooligans
October 14	Fresno	United States	Save Mart Center	OneRepublic; Bruno Mars & the Hooligans
October 15	Sacramento	United States	ARCO Arena	OneRepublic; Bruno Mars & the Hooligans
October 16	San Diego	United States	Viejas Arena	OneRepublic; Bruno Mars & the Hooligans
October 19	Tulsa	United States	BOK Center	OneRepublic; Ry Cuming
October 21	Dallas	United States	Superpages.com Center	OneRepublic; Ry Cuming
October 22	The Woodlands	United States	Cynthia Woods Mitchell Pavilion	OneRepublic; Ry Cuming
October 23	Biloxi	United States	Hard Rock Live	OneRepublic; Ry Cuming
October 27	Chicago	United States	UIC Pavilion	OneRepublic; Ry Cuming
October 28	Minneapolis	United States	Target Center	OneRepublic; Ry Cuming
October 29	Mahnomen	United States	Shooting Star Casino	Ry Cuming

== Cancelled shows ==
List of cancelled concerts, showing date, city, country, venue and reason for cancellation
Date	City	Country	Venue	Reason
2010
August 6	Noblesville	United States	Verizon Wireless Music Center	Moved to Murat Theatre.
August 10	Mansfield	United States	Comcast Center	Moved to Bank of America Pavilion.
August 31	Dayton	United States	Fifth Third Field	Moved to Fraze Pavilion.
