= 2011 Summer Tour (Maroon 5 and Train) =

2011 concert tour by Maroon 5 and Train

- Tour by Maroon 5 and Train
- Location: North America
- Associated album: Hands All Over; Save Me, San Francisco
- Start date: July 22, 2011
- End date: September 24, 2011
- Legs: 2
- No. of shows: 42
Maroon 5 chronology
Hands All Over Tour (2011–2012)	2011 Summer Tour (2011)	Hands All Over Tour (2011–2012)
Train chronology
Save Me, San Francisco Tour (2010)	2011 Summer Tour (2011)	California 37 Tour (2012)

The 2011 Summer Tour was a co-headlining tour by American bands Maroon 5 and Train. Beginning in July 2011, the tour supported both of the bands' albums, Hands All Over and Save Me, San Francisco, respectively. The tour included more than 42 dates in the United States and Canada.

== Opening acts ==
- Gavin DeGraw (Leg 1; select dates)
- PJ Morton (Leg 1; select dates)
- Matt Nathanson (Legs 1 & 2; select dates)
- Nikki Jean (Leg 1; select dates)
- Javier Colon (Leg 1; one show)
- Stevie Nicks (Leg 1; one show)
- Gentlemen Hall (Leg 2; one show)

== Setlists ==
Maroon 5
1. "Moves Like Jagger"
2. "Harder to Breathe" (contains elements of "Power")
3. "Sunday Morning"
4. "If I Never See Your Face Again"
5. "Misery"
6. "Makes Me Wonder"
7. "The Sun"
8. "Man In the Mirror" (Michael Jackson cover) (with Javier Colon)
9. "Never Gonna Leave This Bed"
10. "Wake Up Call"
11. "Stutter"
12. "This Love"

Encore

1. "Leather and Lace" (with Stevie Nicks)
2. "Hands All Over"
3. "She Will Be Loved"
Train
1. "Parachute"
2. "If It’s Love"
3. "Meet Virginia"
4. "She’s On Fire"
5. "Calling All Angels"
6. "Heart of Glass" (Blondie cover) / "I Still Haven't Found What I'm Looking For" (U2 cover) (with Ana Lenchantin and Jimmy Stafford)
7. "Ramble On" (Led Zeppelin cover) (contains elements of "A Walk on the Wild Side")
8. "Save Me San Francisco"
9. "Ordinary"
10. "Marry Me"
11. "Hey Soul Sister"

Encore

1. "Free"
2. "Drops of Jupiter"

== Tour dates ==
Date	City	Country	Venue	Opening acts
Leg 1
July 22, 2011	Chula Vista	United States	Cricket Wireless Amphitheatre	Gavin DeGraw
July 23, 2011	Paso Robles	United States	California Mid-State Fair	Gavin DeGraw
July 25, 2011	Los Angeles	United States	Hollywood Bowl	Gavin DeGraw; Javier Colon; Stevie Nicks
July 27, 2011	Albuquerque	United States	Sandia Casino	Gavin DeGraw
July 28, 2011	Morrison	United States	Red Rocks Amphitheatre	Gavin DeGraw
July 31, 2011	Mount Pleasant	United States	Soaring Eagle Casino & Resort	Gavin DeGraw
August 2, 2011	Charlotte	United States	Verizon Wireless Amphitheatre	Gavin DeGraw
August 3, 2011	Virginia Beach	United States	Farm Bureau Live at Virginia Beach	Gavin DeGraw
August 5, 2011	Camden	United States	Susquehanna Bank Center	Gavin DeGraw
August 6, 2011	Bethlehem	United States	PNC Plaza	PJ Morton
August 7, 2011	Mashantucket	United States	MGM Grand Theater at Foxwoods	—N/a
August 9, 2011	Saratoga Springs	United States	Saratoga Performing Arts Center	Gavin DeGraw
August 12, 2011	Wantagh	United States	Jones Beach Theater	Matt Nathanson
August 13, 2011	Mansfield	United States	Comcast Center	PJ Morton
August 15, 2011	Hershey	United States	Hersheypark Stadium	PJ Morton
August 17, 2011	Nashville	United States	Bridgestone Arena	PJ Morton
August 18, 2011	Indianapolis	United States	Conseco Fieldhouse (Note: The show was originally scheduled to be held at the Indianan State Fair, but was relocated due to the Indiana State Fair stage collapse.)	PJ Morton
August 19, 2011	Des Moines	United States	Iowa State Fair Grandstands	PJ Morton
August 21, 2011	Clarkston	United States	DTE Energy Music Theatre	Nikki Jean
August 22, 2011	Toronto	Canada	Molson Canadian Amphitheatre	Nikki Jean
August 24, 2011	Columbia	United States	Merriweather Post Pavilion	Gavin DeGraw
August 25, 2011	Syracuse	United States	New York State Fair	Gavin DeGraw
August 26, 2011	Holmdel	United States	PNC Bank Arts Center	Gavin DeGraw
August 28, 2011	Louisville	United States	Freedom Hall / Kentucky State Fair	Matt Nathanson
August 30, 2011	West Palm Beach	United States	Cruzan Amphitheater	Matt Nathanson
August 31, 2011	Tampa	United States	1-800-ASK-GARY Amphitheater	Matt Nathanson
September 1, 2011	Alpharetta	United States	Verizon Wireless Amphitheatre	Matt Nathanson
September 4, 2011	Kansas City	United States	Starlight Theatre	Matt Nathanson
September 5, 2011	Minneapolis	United States	Minnesota State Fair	Matt Nathanson
September 7, 2011	Winnipeg	Canada	MTS Centre	Matt Nathanson
September 9, 2011	Saskatoon	Canada	Credit Union Centre	Matt Nathanson
September 10, 2011	Edmonton	Canada	Rexall Place	Matt Nathanson
September 12, 2011	Abbotsford	Canada	Abbotsford Ent. & Sports Centre	Matt Nathanson
September 13, 2011	Auburn	United States	White River Amphitheatre	Matt Nathanson
September 15, 2011	Concord	United States	Sleep Train Pavilion at Concord	Matt Nathanson
September 16, 2011	Las Vegas	United States	The Pearl at The Palms	Matt Nathanson
September 17, 2011	Phoenix	United States	Ashley Furniture HomeStore Pavilion	Matt Nathanson
September 19, 2011	Tucson	United States	Anselmo Valencia Tori Amphitheater	Matt Nathanson
September 22, 2011	Oklahoma City	United States	Zoo Amphitheater	Matt Nathanson
September 23, 2011	Dallas	United States	Gexa Energy Pavilion	Gentlemen Hall; Matt Nathanson
September 24, 2011	The Woodlands	United States	Cynthia Woods Mitchell Pavilion	Matt Nathanson
