= Hands All Over Tour =

2010–2012 concert tour by Maroon 5

- Tour by Maroon 5
- Promotional poster for the tour
- Associated album: Hands All Over
- Start date: February 16, 2011
- End date: July 21, 2012
- Legs: 12
- No. of shows: 61

Maroon 5 concert chronology
- Palm Trees & Power Lines Tour
  (2010)
- Hands All Over Tour
  (2011–2012)
- 2011 Summer Tour
  (2011)
2011 Summer Tour (2011)	Hands All Over Tour (2011–2012)	Overexposed Tour (2012–2014)

The Hands All Over Tour was the sixth concert tour by the American pop rock band Maroon 5, in support of their third studio album Hands All Over (2010). It began on February 16, 2011, in Bristol, England, and concluded on July 21, 2012, in Stateline, Nevada, comprising 61 concerts.

== Opening acts ==
- Sara Bareilles
- Emily King
- Juliana Down
- Carolina Liar
- The Like
- Ry Cuming
- PJ Morton
- Javier Colon
- The Assembly Line
- Dave Dario
- Starliners

Cobra Starship was originally set to attend the tour in Australia, but later cancelled in order to work on their fourth album Night Shades (2011). Diego Boneta was originally opened with shows on May 17 & 18, 2012, before he dropped out. Javier Colon replaced Boneta.

== Setlist ==
1. "Misery"
2. "If I Never See Your Face Again"
3. "Harder to Breathe"
4. "Give a Little More"
5. "The Sun"
6. "Won't Go Home Without You"
7. "Never Gonna Leave This Bed"
8. "Secret" / "What's Love Got to Do with It" (Tina Turner cover)
9. "Wake Up Call"
10. "She Will Be Loved"
11. "Shiver"
12. "Stutter"
13. "Makes Me Wonder"
14. "This Love"

Encore

13. "Hands All Over"
14. "Sunday Morning"

== Shows ==
Date	City	Country	Venue
2011
Europe
February 16	Bristol	England	Colston Hall
February 17	London	England	O_{2} Brixton Academy
February 18	London	England	O_{2} Brixton Academy
February 20	Birmingham	England	O_{2} Academy Birmingham
February 21	Manchester	England	O_{2} Apollo Manchester
February 22	Glasgow	Scotland	O_{2} Academy Glasgow
February 24	Dublin	Ireland	Grand Canal Theatre
February 26	Esch-sur-Alzette	Luxembourg	Rockhal
February 27	Cologne	Germany	Live Music Hall
February 28	Amsterdam	Netherlands	Heineken Music Hall
March 2	Paris	France	Casino de Paris
March 3	Offenbach	Germany	Capitol
April 15	Istanbul	Turkey	Turkcell Kuruçeşme Arena
Asia
April 21	Dubai	United Arab Emirates	Dubai World Trade Centre
April 23	Bangkok	Thailand	Impact Arena
April 25	Singapore		Singapore Indoor Stadium
April 27	Jakarta	Indonesia	Istora Senayan
April 29	Kuala Lumpur	Malaysia	Putra Indoor Stadium
Oceania
May 5	Melbourne	Australia	Rod Laver Arena
May 6	Sydney	Australia	Acer Arena
May 7	Brisbane	Australia	Brisbane Entertainment Centre
Asia
May 12	Osaka	Japan	Osaka-jō Hall
May 13	Nagoya	Japan	Nagoya Century Hall
May 15	Yokohama	Japan	Pacific Yokohama Hall
May 16	Tokyo	Japan	Nippon Budokan
May 17	Tokyo	Japan	Nippon Budokan
May 19	Taipei	Taiwan	Taipei Nangang Exhibition Center
May 21	Hong Kong		AsiaWorld–Arena
May 23	Pasay	Philippines	SMX Convention Center
May 25 (Note: The concert on May 25, 2011 in Seoul was part of the 2011 Hyundai Card Super Concert Series.)	Seoul	South Korea	Olympic Gymnastics Arena
May 26 (Note: The concert on May 26, 2011 in Busan was part of the 2011 Hyundai Card Super Concert Series.)	Busan	South Korea	KBS Hall
North America
June 18 (Note: The concert on June 18, 2011 in San Francisco was part of the Genentech Gives Back benefit concert.)	San Francisco	United States	AT&T Park
June 24	Endicott	United States	En-Joie Golf Club
June 30 (Note: The concerts on June 30 and July 1, 2011 in Highland Park were part of the Ravinia Festival.)	Highland Park	United States	Ravinia Park
July 1	Highland Park	United States	Ravinia Park
July 2 (Note: The concert on July 2, 2011 in Milwaukee was part of Summerfest.)	Milwaukee	United States	Henry Maier Festival Park
July 3	St. Louis	United States	Gateway Arch National Park
Latin America
October 1 (Note: The concert on October 1, 2011 in Rio de Janeiro was part of Rock in Rio. Maroon 5 are stepping in for Jay-Z, as he dropped out due to personal reasons.)	Rio de Janeiro	Brazil	Cidade do Rock
Europe
November 27 (Note: The November 27, 2011 concert at the Crocus City Hall in Moscow was originally scheduled to take place on March 20, 2011, but was postponed due to unforeseen scheduling conflicts.)	Moscow	Russia	Crocus City Hall
November 28 (Note: The November 28, 2011 concert at the Ice Palace in St. Petersburg was originally scheduled to take place on March 19, 2011, but was postponed due to unforeseen scheduling conflicts.)	St. Petersburg	Russia	Ice Palace
November 30	Helsinki	Finland	Kaapelitehdas
December 2	Copenhagen	Denmark	Falkoner Salen
December 3 (Note: The December 3, 2011 concert at Docks in Hamburg was originally scheduled to take place on March 12, 2011, but was postponed due to unforeseen scheduling conflicts.)	Hamburg	Germany	Docks
December 4	Berlin	Germany	Columbiahalle
December 6	Munich	Germany	Tonhalle
December 7 (Note: The December 7, 2011 concert at Volkshaus in Zürich was originally scheduled to take place on March 4, 2011, but was postponed due to unforeseen scheduling conflicts.)	Zürich	Switzerland	Volkshaus
December 10	Rome	Italy	Atlantic Area
December 11 (Note: The December 11, 2011 concert at Alcatraz in Milan was originally scheduled to take place on March 9, 2011, but was postponed due to unforeseen scheduling conflicts.)	Milan	Italy	Alcatraz
December 13 (Note: The December 13, 2011 concert at Vienna Gasometers in Vienna was originally scheduled to take place on March 7, 2011, but was postponed due to unforeseen scheduling conflicts.)	Vienna	Austria	Vienna Gasometers
North America
December 31 (Note: The concert on December 31, 2011 in Las Vegas was part of the New Year's Eve 2012 event.)	Thackerville	United States	WinStar World Casino
2012
Latin America
March 24	Alajuela	Costa Rica	Autodromo La Guacima
North America
May 11	Chula Vista	United States	Cricket Wireless Amphitheatre
May 12	Carson	United States	Home Depot Center
May 17	Mashantucket	United States	Foxwoods Resort Casino
May 18	Atlantic City	United States	Revel Casino Hotel
May 19	Baltimore	United States	Pimlico Race Course
May 20	Gulfport	United States	Jones Park
May 23	Las Vegas	United States	Venetian Hotel & Casino
Europe
June 1 (Note: The concert on June 1, 2012 in Lisbon was part of Rock in Rio Lisbon.)	Lisbon	Portugal	Bela Vista Park
North America
June 30 (Note: The concert on June 30, 2012 in Miami was part of the 2012 iHeartRadio Ultimate Pool Party.)	Miami	United States	Fontainebleau Miami Beach
July 21	Stateline	United States	Harveys Lake Tahoe

== Cancelled shows ==
List of cancelled concerts, showing date, city, country, venue and reason for cancellation
Date	City	Country	Venue	Reason
2011
March 6	Munich	Germany	Muffathalle	Moved to Tonhalle
March 13	Berlin	Germany	DE Huxleys	Moved to Columbiahalle
March 14	Copenhagen	Denmark	Vega	Moved to Falkoner Salen
March 16	Helsinki	Finland	Kulttuuritalo	Moved to Kaapelitehdas
April 19	Cairo	Egypt	Gezira Youth Center	Logistical issues
May 1	Perth	Australia	Burswood Dome	Unforeseen circumstances
May 9	Adelaide	Australia	Adelaide Entertainment Centre	Unforeseen circumstances
July 3	St. Louis	United States	Gateway Arch National Park	Inclement weather
December 9	Pandova	Italy	Gran Teatro Geox	Scheduling issues due to a live performance on the reality television series X Factor Italy.
2012
July 27	Buenos Aires	Argentina	Estadio Ferro Carril Oeste	Unforeseen scheduling conflicts, later rescheduled to the band's Overexposed Tour.
July 29	Asunción	Paraguay	Jockey Club del Paraguay	Unforeseen scheduling conflicts, later rescheduled to the band's Overexposed Tour.
July 31	Santiago	Chile	Movistar Arena	Unforeseen scheduling conflicts, later rescheduled to the band's Overexposed Tour.
August 2	Lima	Peru	Estádio Nacional	Unforeseen scheduling conflicts, later rescheduled to the band's Overexposed Tour.
