= Out of Goodbyes =

Song by Maroon 5 featuring Lady Antebellum

from the album Hands All Over
- Released: September 15, 2010
- Recorded: July – December 2009
- Studio: Lake Geneva in Vevey, Switzerland
- Genre: Country ballad
- Length: 3:17
- Label: A&M Octone
- Songwriters: Adam Levine; Jesse Carmichael; James Valentine
- Producer: Robert John "Mutt" Lange

Music video
- "Out of Goodbyes" on YouTube

"Out of Goodbyes" is a song by American pop rock band Maroon 5, featuring the country band Lady Antebellum. It was released as the closing track on their third studio album, Hands All Over (2010). "Out of Goodbyes" sees Maroon 5 branching out from their usual funk rock/pop sound and making a country ballad. Although the song did not enter the Billboard Hot 100 chart, it did peak at number three on the Bubbling Under Hot 100 Singles chart.

== Background ==
The majority of "Out of Goodbyes" was recorded in one day during the "Hands All Over" sessions. The started as an idea keyboardist/guitarist Jesse Carmichael had been playing on acoustic guitar. He stated that it originally "sounded more Fleetwood Mac-influenced", but as frontman Adam Levine started adding more harmonies, it took on more of a country feel. After the song was complete, the band realized it would work well as a duet, and so contacted Lady Antebellum to feature on it. According to Carmichael, they specifically were chosen because "Lady Antebellum are kind of like the equivalent of our band in the country world". On the song Levine stated "Mutt helped me orchestrate some higher harmony things that sounded like they could be from a female,. We thought, 'Wow, we need a girl to sing this, it sounds like a country duet.' And that's what it turned into," and "They did an incredible job. We wrote the song and her voice (Hillary Scott) was perfect for it and the band filled in the spaces in a beautiful way. It was a great collaboration."

== Critical reception ==
"Out of Goodbyes" received mixed reviews from critics. On the positive side, writers from the BBC called it a "sonic delight", and Now chose it as the album's best song. On the negative side, Pop Blerd called the song the weakest of the album, and V13 called it "pretty but not very interesting".

== Music video ==
The music video for "Out of Goodbyes" was released on YouTube on May 17th, 2011. The video shows neither band, instead being a story with a man and a woman. It shows the woman cleaning a bloody wound and removing a bullet from the man's chest, after which she gets up to leave, but instead grabs her revolver and shoots him. The video features country singer/actor Dwight Yoakam as the cowboy and actress Diora Baird as the woman. It was directed by Travis Schneider.

== Charts ==
Chart (2010)	Peak position
US Bubbling Under Hot 100 Singles (Billboard)	3
US Digital Song Sales (Billboard)	58

== Personnel ==
Based on the liner notes of Hands All Over as well as the documentary "Vevey Forever".

Maroon 5

- Adam Levine – co-lead vocals, guitar
- Jesse Carmichael – acoustic guitar, keyboards
- Mickey Madden – bass guitar
- James Valentine – acoustic guitar
- Matt Flynn – drums, percussion

Lady Antebellum

- Hillary Scott – co-lead vocals
- Charles Kelley – acoustic guitar, backing vocals
- Dave Haywood – mandolin, backing vocals

Additional musicians

- Bruce Bouton – additional guitar

Production

- Robert John "Mutt" Lange – producer
- Sam Farrar – additional production, composer, engineer, programming
- Noah "Mailbox" Passovoy – additional production, composer, engineer, programming
- Brad Blackwood – mastering
- Isha Erskine – engineer
- Mike Shipley – mixing engineer
- Olle Romo – Pro-Tools engineer
- Brian Wohlgemuth – assistant Pro-Tools engineer
