= UK + Europe 2023 =

2023 concert tour by Maroon 5

- Continental tour by Maroon 5
- Promotional poster for the tour
- Location: Europe
- Associated album: Jordi
- Start date: June 13, 2023
- End date: July 4, 2023
- No. of shows: 12

Maroon 5 concert chronology
- World Tour 2022 (2022); UK + Europe 2023 (2023); 2024 North American Summer Tour (2024)

UK + Europe 2023 was the fifteenth concert tour by American pop rock band Maroon 5, in support of their seventh studio album, Jordi (2021). It began on June 13, 2023, in Lisbon and concluded on July 4, 2023, in Birmingham, comprising 12 concerts.

== Tour dates ==
List of 2023 concerts
Date	City	Country	Venue	Opening act(s)	Attendance	Revenue
June 13	Lisbon	Portugal	Passeio Maritimo De Alges	Davina Michelle; DJ Noah Passovoy	–	–
June 15	Madrid	Spain	Wizink Center	Gunnar Gehl; DJ Noah Passovoy	10,452 / 13,108	–
June 16	Barcelona	Spain	Palau Sant Jordi	Gunnar Gehl; DJ Noah Passovoy	9,876 / 13,017	–
June 18 (Note: The concert on June 18, 2023 in Florence was part of the 2023 Firenze Rocks Festival.)	Florence	Italy	Visarno Arena	—	14,682 / 16,800	–
June 21 (Note: The concert on June 21, 2023 in Prague was part of the 2023 Prague Rocks Festival.)	Prague	Czech Republic	Letnany Airport	—	–	–
June 23 (Note: The concert on June 23, 2023 in Odense was part of the 2023 Tinderbox Music Festival.)	Odense	Denmark	Tusindårsskoven	—	–	–
June 25 (Note: The concert on June 25, 2023 was originally scheduled to take place at Goffertpark in Nijmegen, but was moved to the Ziggo Dome in Amsterdam.)	Amsterdam	Netherlands	Ziggo Dome	Gunnar Gehl; DJ Noah Passovoy	11,231 / 13,564	–
June 27 (Note: The concert on June 27, 2023 was originally scheduled to take place at Waldbühne, but was moved to the Mercedes-Benz Arena.)	Berlin	Germany	Mercedes-Benz Arena	Davina Michelle; DJ Noah Passovoy	10,893 / 12,542	–
June 29	Paris	France	Paris La Défense Arena	Gunnar Gehl; DJ Noah Passovoy	15,234 / 29,893	–
June 30 (Note: The concert on June 30, 2023 in Arras was part of the 2023 Main Square Festival.)	Arras	France	Citadelle d'Arras	—	–	–
July 3	London	England	The O_{2} Arena	Gunnar Gehl; DJ Noah Passovoy	11,432 / 14,573	–
July 4	Birmingham	England	Resorts World Arena	Gunnar Gehl; DJ Noah Passovoy	7,894 / 10,934	–
