= World Tour 2022 =

2022 concert tour by Maroon 5

- World tour by Maroon 5
- Promotional poster for the tour
- Location: Africa, Asia, Europe, North America, Oceania, South America
- Associated album: Jordi
- Start date: March 30, 2022
- End date: December 31, 2022
- Legs: 6
- No. of shows: 21

Maroon 5 concert chronology
- MMXXI Tour (2021); World Tour 2022 (2022); UK + Europe 2023 (2023)

The World Tour 2022 was the fourteenth headlining concert tour by American band Maroon 5. It began on March 30, 2022 in Mexico City, and concluded on December 31, 2022 in Thousand Palms, California, comprising 21 concerts.

== Controversy ==
In July 2022, the band announced an Asian leg of the tour. Korean fans responded to this by telling the band that using a rising sun flag in Japan on their World Tour 2022 posters was disrespectful and controversial. Maroon 5 later removed the flag on the original poster and replaced it with a new poster featuring the members of the band on their official website.

== Shows ==
List of 2022 concerts
Date (2022)	City	Country	Venue	Opening act
March 30	Mexico City	Mexico	Foro Sol	Motel; DJ Noah Passovoy
April 1 (Note: The concert on April 1, 2022 in Monterrey as part of the 2022 Pal Norte festival.)	Monterrey	Mexico	Fundidora Park	—N/a
April 5	São Paulo	Brazil	Allianz Parque	Jão; DJ Noah Passovoy
April 6	Porto Alegre	Brazil	Fiergs	Zaka
April 8 (Note: The concert on April 8, 2022 in Buenos Aires was originally scheduled on March 12, 2020 and then March 11, 2021, but it was rescheduled due to the COVID-19 pandemic.)	Buenos Aires	Argentina	Campo Argentino de Polo	Zoe Gotusso; DJ Noah Passovoy
May 3 (Note: The concert on May 3, 2022 in Giza was part of the Live At the Pyramids show.)	Giza	Egypt	Giza Pyramids	Issam Alnajjar
May 6	Abu Dhabi	United Arab Emirates	Etihad Arena	Issam Alnajjar; DJ Noah Passovoy
May 9	Tel Aviv	Israel	Yarkon Park	Jonathan Mergui; Agam Buhbut; DJ Noah Passovoy
May 10	Tel Aviv	Israel	Yarkon Park	Tamir Grinberg; Roni Duani; Nunu; DJ Noah Passovoy
June 3	Sacramento	United States	Hard Rock Live	DJ Noah Passovoy
June 11 (Note: The concert on June 11, 2022 in Toronto was part of the 2022 RBCxMusic Concert Series.)	Toronto	Canada	St. George's Golf and Country Club	Jessia
July 9 (Note: The concert on July 9, 2022 in Quebec City was part of the 2022 Quebec City Summer Festival.)	Quebec City	Canada	Plains of Abraham	—N/a
August 26 (Note: The concert on August 26, 2022 in Orlando was part of the Music After Dark Experience.)	Orlando	United States	Universal Orlando	DJ Noah Passovoy
November 28	Singapore		National Stadium	—N/a
November 30	Seoul	South Korea	Gocheok Sky Dome	DJ Noah Passovoy
December 3	Tokyo	Japan	Tokyo Dome	DJ Noah Passovoy
December 4	Tokyo	Japan	Tokyo Dome	DJ Noah Passovoy
December 6	Osaka	Japan	Kyocera Dome	DJ Noah Passovoy
December 8	Manila	Philippines	SM Mall of Asia Arena	DJ Noah Passovoy
December 10	Bangkok	Thailand	Rajamangala Stadium	DJ Noah Passovoy
December 31 (Note: The concert on December 31, 2022 in Palm Desert was part of the New Year's Eve 2023 event.)	Thousand Palms	United States	Acrisure Arena	PJ Morton; DJ Noah Passovoy

== Cancelled dates ==
List of cancelled concerts, showing date, city, country, venue and reason for cancellation
Date (2022)	City	Country	Venue	Reason	Ref.
March 26	Santo Domingo	Dominican Republic	Estadio Quisqueya	Unforeseen circumstances	
March 28	San Juan	Puerto Rico	Coliseo De Puerto Rico	Unforeseen circumstances	
April 10	Asunción	Paraguay	Jockey Club	Unforeseen circumstances	
April 13	San Jose	Costa Rica	Coca-Cola Amphitheater	Unforeseen circumstances	
April 16	Punta Cana	Dominican Republic	Hard Rock Hotel & Casino	Unforeseen circumstances	
July 30	Portland	United States	Moda Center	Multitude of unexpected issues and exponentially increased costs of touring	
August 1	Vancouver	Canada	Rogers Arena	Multitude of unexpected issues and exponentially increased costs of touring	
August 3	Calgary	Canada	Scotiabank Saddledome	Multitude of unexpected issues and exponentially increased costs of touring	
August 5	Edmonton	Canada	Rogers Place	Multitude of unexpected issues and exponentially increased costs of touring	
August 6	Saskatoon	Canada	SaskTel Centre	Multitude of unexpected issues and exponentially increased costs of touring	
August 8	Billings	United States	MetraPark Arena	Multitude of unexpected issues and exponentially increased costs of touring	
August 10	Lincoln	United States	Pinnacle Bank Arena	Multitude of unexpected issues and exponentially increased costs of touring	
August 12	Fargo	United States	Fargodome	Multitude of unexpected issues and exponentially increased costs of touring	
August 13	Saint Paul	United States	Xcel Energy Center	Multitude of unexpected issues and exponentially increased costs of touring	
August 15	Green Bay	United States	Resch Center	Multitude of unexpected issues and exponentially increased costs of touring	
August 17	Grand Rapids	United States	Van Andel Arena	Multitude of unexpected issues and exponentially increased costs of touring	
August 20	Montreal	Canada	Centre Bell	Multitude of unexpected issues and exponentially increased costs of touring	
