= Misery (Maroon 5 song) =

2010 single by Maroon 5

Single by Maroon 5

from the album Hands All Over
- B-side: "Through with You"
- Released: June 22, 2010
- Genre: Funk rock; funk-pop; pop rock
- Length: 3:36
- Label: A&M Octone
- Songwriters: Adam Levine; Jesse Carmichael; Sam Farrar
- Producer: Robert John "Mutt" Lange

Maroon 5 singles chronology
"Goodnight Goodnight" (2008)	"Misery" (2010)	"Give a Little More" (2010)

Music video
- "Misery" on YouTube

"Misery" is a song by American band Maroon 5. It was released on June 22, 2010, by A&M Octone Records, as the lead single from their third studio album Hands All Over (2010).

== Background and writing ==
Written by Adam Levine, Jesse Carmichael, and Sam Farrar, the song is about the narrator finding himself in a difficult situation when a relationship fades. "Why won't you answer me? / The silence is slowly killing me / Girl you really got me bad," he states in the lyrics. The song documents the decay of a relationship, familiar territory for the band. Levine told MTV News: "'Misery' is about the desperation of wanting someone really badly in your life but having it be very difficult. Kind of what all the songs I write are about. I'm not treading on new ground, but I think a lot of people – including myself – deal with that all the time. Relationships are difficult, and it's good therapy to write about them."

== Critical reception ==
Bill Lamb from About.com, while reviewing the single, awarded it with the maximum of stars (5 out of 5), saying: "All of the usual elements of a Maroon 5 hit are here, from the perky pop-soul sound to lyrics of intense conflict in a relationship. However, this time the band takes it all a few steps forward into the category of pop perfection. Quite possibly a key reason for this step forward is the presence of the by now legendary Robert John 'Mutt' Lange in the producers chair. 'Misery' is instantly the best mainstream pop single of 2010 so far."

MTV Buzzworthy stated that the single was "pretty classic Maroon 5", and "a buoyant, poppy affair that has a dark underbelly." AOL Radio stated that it was a "falsetto-pleading, yet upbeat, keyboard-popping track" with a chorus similar to Maroon 5's 2004 single "This Love". Rolling Stone reviewers called the song a "funk-rock singalong" that "some people might have a hard time picking out... from a police line-up of Maroon 5 songs."

== Music video ==
=== Background ===
The video was filmed in May 2010. Levine stated to MTV News that the song's music video, directed by Joseph Kahn, focuses on violence, rather than sex, where the female decides to assault, assassinate, kill, rape, maim, humiliate, injure, and bruise her own significant other. The music video stars Russian model Anne Vyalitsyna (Levine's girlfriend at the time). The various members of the band appear as bystanders or passersby who get variously hit by cars, etc., as they wind up becoming casualties of the female lead's violence towards Levine's character. The video premiered on July 1, 2010, on MTV and VH1. The UK version of the video was released on August 11, 2010, also co-directed by Kahn with Don Tyler did with the animation. Tyler would later direct with the band's "Hands All Over" music video. This version censored the majority of the violence with cartoon-like graphics, and adds shots of the band (wearing the same outfits as they do in the rest of the video).

Levine told MTV News about the Joseph Kahn-directed video. "The cool thing is, when Joseph wrote the treatment after reading a few sentences, I thought it was really amazing," he said. "Because it kind of turns the whole idea of the sexual energy between two people – a guy and a girl, a music video, you've seen that a million times – that exists in this video, but it's turning it on its ass and having the girl be the more domineering one who's trying to kill me." Levine admitted to MTV News: "I'll tell you a little secret... the stuntmen were so great, but they probably weren't too happy because they had to dress like us for the video, which was hilarious, because we aren't the most masculine dressers. This dude who was keyboardist Jesse Carmichael's stunt double was, like, really buff, and he has Jesse's little low-top Converse and skinny jeans on. The shoes were, like, falling off his massive ankles."

Levine added: "I did a lot of stuff, a lot of stuff is me! But most of it wasn't very dangerous. Although, by the end of the day, even not being hit by things is such a physical thing that I was really kind of beat up. I was like, 'Man, even thinking I got my ass kicked feels like getting my ass kicked.'"

=== Reception ===
Robbie Daw from Idolator called director Joseph Kahn a "visual maestro". MTV Buzzworthy also reviewed the video positively, saying: "Adam Levine and model Anne Vyalitsyna make a love-hate relationship look so sexy in Maroon 5's new video, "Misery".

== Live performances ==
On July 1, 2010, Maroon 5 performed "Misery" for the first time at the Empire Hotel in New York City, as part of the Vevo Summer Sets concert series. On July 2, the band performed the track on The Today Show, at Rockefeller Plaza in New York. In September 2010, the band continued with the song at Scala nightclub in King's Cross, London for the BBC Radio 2 in Concert series on September 9, and the Coca-Cola Live @ MTV: The Summer Song concert at Piazza del Plebiscito in Naples, Italy, on September 18.

The same month, Maroon 5 also played "Misery" live during their appearances on Live from Studio Five, Late Show with David Letterman, The Ellen DeGeneres Show and Jimmy Kimmel Live!, respectively. The band performed the song for a special concert with the launch of Windows Phone 7, at the AT&T Store in The Fillmore, San Francisco on November 8, 2010. They played with the song in at home performance of Live @ Home in December 2010. "Misery" was also performed for the band's concert tours, Palm Trees & Power Lines Tour and the Hands All Over Tour.

== Awards and nominations ==
Year	Ceremony	Category	Result	Ref.
2010	Billboard Japan Music Awards	Hot 100 Airplay of the Year	Nominated	
2010	Billboard Japan Music Awards	Adult Contemporary of the Year	Won	
2011	ASCAP Pop Music Awards	Most Performed Song	Won	
2011	BMI Pop Awards	Award Winning Song	Won	
2011	Grammy Awards	Best Pop Performance by a Duo or Group with Vocal	Nominated	
2011	RTHK International Pop Poll Awards	Top 10 International Gold Song	Won	

== Track listing ==
- Digital download
1. "Misery" – 3:36
- Germany commercial single
1. "Misery" – 3:36
2. "Through with You" (Live) – 3:20
- Digital download – Misery remixes singles
1. "Misery" (Diplo Put Me Out Of My Misery Mix) – 4:26
2. "Misery" (The Elements Remix) – 3:32
- Remixes EP
1. "Misery" (Bimbo Jones Club Mix) – 4:14
2. "Misery" (Bimbo Jones Radio Edit) – 2:57
3. "Misery" (Bimbo Jones Dub Mix) – 7:24
4. "Misery" (Cutmore Got Da Funk Mix) – 5:41
5. "Misery" (Cutmore Radio Edit) – 3:38
6. "Misery" (Cutmore Dub Mix) – 6:26

== Charts ==
=== Weekly charts ===
Chart (2010–2011)	Peak position
Australia (ARIA)	39
Austria (Ö3 Austria Top 40)	28
Belgium (Ultratip Bubbling Under Flanders)	2
Belgium (Ultratop 50 Wallonia)	30
Canada Hot 100 (Billboard)	13
Canada AC (Billboard)	5
Canada CHR/Top 40 (Billboard)	22
Canada Hot AC (Billboard)	4
CIS Airplay (TopHit)	91
Denmark (Tracklisten)	28
France Download (SNEP)	14
Germany (GfK)	30
Hungary (Rádiós Top 40)	4
Ireland (IRMA)	10
Israel International Airplay (Media Forest)	6
Italy (FIMI)	19
Italian Airplay (EarOne)	5
Japan Hot 100 (Billboard)	4
Netherlands (Dutch Top 40)	10
Netherlands (Single Top 100)	32
New Zealand (Recorded Music NZ)	38
Poland (Polish Airplay New)	2
Spain (Spanish Airplay Chart)	20
South Korea International Singles (GAON)	4
Switzerland (Schweizer Hitparade)	32
UK Singles (Official Charts)	30
US Billboard Hot 100	14
US Adult Alternative Airplay (Billboard)	28
US Adult Contemporary (Billboard)	9
US Adult Pop Airplay (Billboard)	1
US Dance Club Songs (Billboard)	5
US Pop Airplay (Billboard)	8
Venezuela Pop Rock General (Record Report)	1

=== Year-end charts ===
Chart (2010)	Position
Canada (Canadian Hot 100)	70
Hungary (Rádiós Top 40)	30
Italy Airplay (EarOne)	11
Japan (Japan Hot 100)	19
Japan Adult Contemporary (Billboard)	1
Netherlands (Dutch Top 40)	48
Taiwan (Hito Radio)	70
US Billboard Hot 100	62
US Adult Contemporary (Billboard)	35
US Adult Top 40 (Billboard)	8
US Mainstream Top 40 (Billboard)	41

Chart (2011)	Position
Hungary (Rádiós Top 40)	37
US Adult Contemporary (Billboard)	32

Chart (2022)	Position
Hungary (Rádiós Top 40)	87

== Certifications ==
Region	Certification	Certified units/sales
Australia (ARIA)	2× Platinum	140,000^{‡}
Brazil (Pro-Música Brasil)	2× Platinum	120,000^{‡}
Canada (Music Canada)	Platinum	80,000^{*}
Denmark (IFPI Danmark)	Gold	45,000^{‡}
Japan (RIAJ)	Gold	100,000^{*}
Mexico (AMPROFON)	Gold	30,000^{*}
New Zealand (RMNZ)	Platinum	30,000^{‡}
United Kingdom (BPI)	Silver	200,000^{‡}
United States (RIAA)	2× Platinum	1,991,000
^{*} Sales figures based on certification alone.^{‡} Sales+streaming figures based on certification alone.

== Release history ==
Release dates and formats
Region	Date	Format	Version	Label(s)	Ref.
United States	June 22, 2010	Digital download	Original	A&M Octone	
United States	June 28, 2010	Mainstream radio	Original	A&M Octone	
Various	August 4, 2010	Digital download	Diplo Remix	A&M Octone	
Various	August 4, 2010	Digital download	The Elements Remix	A&M Octone	
Germany	September 3, 2010	CD; digital download	Original	A&M Octone	
Various	September 28, 2010	Digital download	Remixes EP	A&M Octone	
