= Give a Little More =

Single by Maroon 5

from the album Hands All Over
- Released: August 17, 2010
- Genre: Disco-boogie; funk-pop; rock
- Length: 3:00
- Label: A&M Octone
- Songwriters: Adam Levine; Jesse Carmichael; James Valentine
- Producer: Robert John "Mutt" Lange

Maroon 5 singles chronology
"Misery" (2010)	"Give a Little More" (2010)	"Never Gonna Leave This Bed" (2011)

Music video
- "Give a Little More" on YouTube

"Give a Little More" is a song by American band Maroon 5. It was released on August 17, 2010, as the second single from their third studio album Hands All Over (2010).

== Background and composition ==
"Give a Little More" was written by the band's frontman Adam Levine with keyboardist Jesse Carmichael and guitarist James Valentine. The lyrics talk about how to ask more of a woman who so clearly has you wrapped around her finger, "You were wrong for turning me on and on and on," Levine sings. "I'm waiting for something, always waiting / Feeling nothing, wondering if it'll ever change." Ultimately, he resigns himself to the fact that, "I have no defense / I know you're gonna get me in the end."

== Critical reception ==
The song received positive reviews from contemporary music critics. Ron Harris from the Associated Press wrote that the song "almost strays into disco territory with it's [sic] body-moving beat." He commented that the song "would not have been terribly out of place in 1979", while complimenting that the song is "fun and funky, which is the prime directive of Maroon 5." Robbie Daw from Idolator wrote a positive review, stating that "M5 are always best when they’re uptempo, so we’re happy to hear that the song falls in line with the band’s more danceable tracks like "Wake Up Call" and "Misery"." Leah Greenblatt from Entertainment Weekly wrote that "Levine's romantic roundelay trundles on, through this airy disco-boogie." Mikael Wood from LA Times wrote that "a light-funk groove as neatly executed as the one in "Give a Little More", for instance, is its own reward". Chris Ryan from MTV News was direct, writing that "the track is classic Maroon; a slithering groove and chicken-scratch guitar laying the foundation for singer Adam Levine's nasal coo and come-hither lyrics."

== Music video ==
The music video for "Give a Little More" was directed by Paul Hunter. The video was released on September 9, 2010. It is shot using a grainy film style complete with intro countdown and outro of the film running off the reel, and consists of quick cuts between close-ups of Levine singing, along with scenes of the band playing at a party inside an older house, with everyone dancing to the music.

== Track listing ==
- Digital download
1. "Give a Little More" – 3:00
- Roger Sanchez Remixes EP
1. "Give a Little More" (Club Mix) – 4:14
2. "Give a Little More" (Radio Edit) – 3:30
3. "Give a Little More" (Dub Mix) – 6:21
4. "Give a Little More" (Club Mix - Acapella) – 2:50
5. "Give a Little More" (Club Mix - Instrumental) – 4:13

== Charts ==
Chart (2010)	Peak position
Canada Hot 100 (Billboard)	91
Canada Hot AC (Billboard)	12
CIS Airplay (TopHit)	136
Italian Airplay (EarOne)	21
South Korea International Singles (Gaon Chart)	1
US Billboard Hot 100	86
US Adult Pop Airplay (Billboard)	10
US Dance Club Songs (Billboard)	35
US Pop Airplay (Billboard)	36

== Release history ==
Region	Date	Format	Ref.
United States	August 17, 2010	Digital download	
Canada	August 17, 2010	Digital download	
Australia	October 5, 2010	Contemporary hit radio	
United States	October 12, 2010	Mainstream radio	
