= Hands All Over (album) =

Studio album by Maroon 5
- Released: September 15, 2010
- Recorded: July 2009 – April 2010 (Lake Geneva in Vevey, Switzerland); "Moves Like Jagger" recorded May 2011 (Los Angeles, California)
- Genres: Pop; blue-eyed soul; funk-pop; pop rock
- Length: 43:47
- Label: A&M Octone
- Producers: Robert John "Mutt" Lange; Benny Blanco; Shellback

Maroon 5 chronology
Call and Response: The Remix Album (2008)	Hands All Over (2010)	Overexposed (2012)

Singles from Hands All Over
- 1. "Misery" Released: June 22, 2010; 2. "Give a Little More" Released: August 17, 2010; 3. "Never Gonna Leave This Bed" Released: January 24, 2011; 4. "Moves Like Jagger" Released: June 21, 2011

Hands All Over is the third studio album by American pop rock band Maroon 5, which features guest appearances from American country band Lady Antebellum and singer Christina Aguilera. Produced by veteran producer Robert John "Mutt" Lange, the album was released by A&M Octone Records on September 15, 2010, and debuted at No. 2 on the US Billboard 200. The standard edition of the album includes three singles: "Misery", "Give a Little More" and "Never Gonna Leave This Bed".

On July 12, 2011, the band re-released the album to include their summer hit and the fourth single "Moves Like Jagger".

== Background ==
The band began writing the songs from the third album, after winding down from a world tour in support of their second album It Won't Be Soon Before Long. Several months later, the band received a phone call from Robert John "Mutt" Lange, who had heard the band were beginning to write a new album, and expressed an interest in producing it. In a press release on their official website, the album is described as "a killer hybrid of rock, pop, funk and R&B."

In an interview with Rolling Stone, the band revealed they spent two months writing and recording their third album with producer Robert John "Mutt" Lange in his recording studio in Lake Geneva, Switzerland. Lead singer Adam Levine, spoke about the experience of working with Lange: "He worked me harder than anyone ever has," [...] "I would come in with a finished song, and he'd say, 'That's a good start. Now strip it down to the drums and start over.' The coolest thing about him is that not only has he been a huge, legendary producer, but he also is a legit, serious writer." Rolling Stone has said that the resulting disc is the band's brightest-sounding and poppiest yet and that it delivers Lange's mix of catchy hooks and punchy rhythms. Levine has also said about the album: "Our first record was a reflection of my love for Stevie Wonder. With the second I kept going back and forth between Prince and The Police. But there was no one on my mind for this album. It's just great pop." In a separate interview, however, Levine said that the album was influenced by Tupac Shakur and Marvin Gaye. The album artwork was revealed on July 1, 2010. The cover photo for the album was taken by 19-year-old photographer Rosie Hardy, who also serves as the model in the photo. Hardy took the photo herself in just under an hour, in her own bedroom from the town of Buxton, United Kingdom.

A web series titled Palm Trees & Power Lines, was released in three parts: Part 1 on August 23, Part 2 on October 11, and Part 3 on December 3, 2010, respectively. The series follows the band's journey on their 2010 promotional tour and performing with songs from the album.

== Singles ==
- The lead single to be taken from the album is "Misery". It was released on June 22, 2010. The music video for the single was directed by Joseph Kahn. The song reached No. 14 on the Billboard Hot 100.
- The second single is "Give a Little More", and was released on August 17, 2010. The music video was directed by Paul Hunter.
- The third single, "Never Gonna Leave This Bed", was released to Australian radio in January 2011. It was later released to the US mainstream radio on May 17, 2011. The music video for the song was shot on January 12, 2011 and premiered exclusively on Just Jared on February 4. The band performed the song on The Tonight Show with Jay Leno on January 17. The song debuted at No. 35 on the Billboard's Hot Adult Pop Songs and reached No. 55 on the Billboard Hot 100.
- The fourth and final single, "Moves Like Jagger", featuring Christina Aguilera, was released on June 21, 2011, being the first single from the re-release of the album. The song debuted at No. 8 on the Hot 100, the first Top 10 for Maroon 5 and Aguilera, since "Makes Me Wonder" and "Keeps Gettin' Better" respectively. The song peaked at No. 1 on the issue of August 31, 2011, making this song the band's second No. 1 (after "Makes Me Wonder" in 2007) and Aguilera's fifth No. 1 (after "Lady Marmalade" in 2001). The band performed the song several times, including on America's Got Talent, The Voice, The Today Show, The Ellen DeGeneres Show and Saturday Night Live.

=== Other songs ===
- A music video for the title track "Hands All Over", premiered exclusively on Facebook, on December 22, 2010. Its music video, which was directed by Don Tyler and features stylized animations of the band members and a flirtatious nude woman.
- A music video for the song "Runaway" was released on April 5, 2011, and instead of featuring the five members of the band, this clip focuses on a surfer who enjoys riding the wave and finds solitude in the sea.
- A music video for the closing track "Out of Goodbyes" (with country group Lady Antebellum) released on May 16, 2011, and was directed by Travis Schneider. The video features singer/actor Dwight Yoakam and actress Diora Baird. It shows the woman cleaning a bloody wound and removing a bullet from the man's chest, after which she gets up to leave, but grabs her revolver and shoots him. The song did not enter the Hot 100 chart, but it did peak at the Bubbling Under Hot 100 Singles chart at No. 3.
- "Stutter" charted at No. 84 on the Billboard Hot 100, due to strong digital downloads when the album was released.
- ”Just a Feeling” was not a hit in America, but did peak and No. 3 in South Korean Charts, years later in 2014.

== Critical reception ==
Professional ratings
Aggregate scores
Source	Rating
AnyDecentMusic?	5.4/10
Metacritic	63/100
Review scores
Source	Rating
AllMusic	4.5/5 stars
Entertainment Weekly	C+
IGN	7/10
The Independent	2/5 stars
Los Angeles Times	2.5/4 stars
Now	3/5
Rolling Stone	3/5 stars
Slant Magazine	2/5 stars
Uncut	3/5 stars
USA Today	3/4 stars

Hands All Over was well received by the music critics, it received a weighted score of 63 out of 100 from review aggregate website Metacritic, indicating "generally favorable reviews", based on 10 reviews from music critics.

Stephen Thomas Erlewine from AllMusic rated the album very highly with 4.5 out of 5 stars, stating that: "Some of the cuts may not sink their hooks in immediately, but track for track Hands All Over is Maroon 5's best album, capturing their character and craft in a cool, sleek package". Bill Lamb from About.com was also positive, awarding it with 4 stars (out of 5), saying: "For their third studio album Maroon 5 add a bit more rock and it looks good on them. There is a loosening up in sound here while keeping the infectious hooks that have always been a major part of the group's appeal. Don't go looking for exceptional depth, but in a period in which mainstream pop sounds are ruling the charts again, Maroon 5 provide a good lesson in exactly how to make a solid pop album".

The IGN review rated Hands All Over seven-stars out of ten, claiming that the album is "programmed to hit all the bases: dance-y tracks, pop anthems, quasi-ballads. Almost every song on this record could be a single...Even though it's formulaic and delivers no surprises, fans of Maroon 5 should find exactly what they are looking for from this record." Jakob Dorof from Slant Magazines review was mixed saying, "It adds a few more gems to the band's growing cache of incredible pop singles and overlooked deep cuts, Hands All Over makes some decent contributions to what could wind up being Maroon 5's true redemption: a damn fine greatest hits record." The Los Angeles Times review says that: "Hands All Over reveals less about who frontman Adam Levine is than did Maroon 5's previous records; too often the songs cleave to opaque generalities". Hugh Montgomery in The Observer wrote that 'Jaunty funk-pop and blustery arena balladry remain the order of the day, while Adam Levine's falsetto whine still proffers all the emotional gravitas of a mosquito'.

Jody Rosen of Rolling Stone claimed, "at the helm, the dozen songs on Hands All Over are models of craftsmanship and efficiency ..." Fraser McAlpine of BBC Music noticed that "The rude guitar sleaze of Hands All Over, or the cocky glam-stomp in Stutter's verses show a band who are really at their best when they play pop music like the sleazy rockers they clearly are." The Boston Globe review felt that "This is lead singer Adam Levine's show. Thus, the band's success lives and dies with his delivery. That delivery remains technically sound, though as a whole, the band underwhelms here". The Now review also felt that "It's an accomplished record for singer Adam Levine and his faceless group, even if the whole affair sometimes sounds clinical in its approach". The Yahoo! Music UK review was mixed, saying that "It's hard to imagine how Hands All Over could have been any more underwhelming. In truth the only exceptional thing about it is just how average it is". The Entertainment Weekly review concluded that "Hands, competent and studio-sleek as it is, too often begs for a fresher muse.

== Commercial performance ==
On the Billboard 200, the album debuted at No. 2 behind You Get What You Give by Zac Brown Band, which despite a high placement sold a relatively weak 142,000 copies, compared to their previous effort, which debuted at No. 1 with 429,000 copies. In the second week, it dropped to No. 9. In November 2010, the album was certified Gold by RIAA, denoting a sales of at least 500,000 copies in the United States. In an interview with Billboard, Maroon 5 guitarist James Valentine expressed some frustration in the lackluster sales of the Hands All Over, saying a new album may be coming sooner than was originally planned. "Of course we could have liked it to have done better so far," Valentine told Billboard, "It hasn't sold at the pace that our previous records did." The lack of response to the latest record has the band thinking about recording another album sooner than they originally planned, but according to Valentine "that may not be a bad thing". However, on the week of September 24, 2011, the album returned to the top 10 for the first time since its second week on the chart last October, climbing from No. 23 to No. 7 with 29,000 copies sold. This was spurred on by a four-day $6.99 sale price in the iTunes Store as well as the success of "Moves like Jagger", and represented the album's best sales frame since its second chart week and highest rank since its debut. The album was certified platinum on January 9, 2012, and as of April 2012 it has sold 1,079,000 copies in the United States.

== Track listings ==
Hands All Over track listing
No.	Title	Writer(s)	Producer(s)	Length
1.	"Misery"	Adam Levine; Jesse Carmichael; Sam Farrar	Robert John "Mutt" Lange	3:36
2.	"Give a Little More"	Levine; Carmichael; James Valentine	Lange	3:00
3.	"Stutter"	Levine; Farrar; Matt Flynn	Lange	3:16
4.	"Don't Know Nothing"	Levine; Farrar	Lange	3:19
5.	"Never Gonna Leave This Bed"	Levine	Lange	3:16
6.	"I Can't Lie"	Levine; Farrar	Lange	3:31
7.	"Hands All Over"	Levine; Carmichael; Farrar	Lange	3:12
8.	"How"	Levine; Carmichael; Farrar; Shawn Tellez	Lange	3:36
9.	"Get Back in My Life"	Levine; Carmichael; Valentine	Lange	3:37
10.	"Just a Feeling"	Levine; Carmichael	Lange	3:46
11.	"Runaway"	Levine; Farrar; Noah Passovoy	Lange	3:01
12.	"Out of Goodbyes" (with Lady Antebellum)	Levine; Carmichael; Valentine	Lange	3:17
Total length:				40:27

European edition bonus track
No.	Title	Writer(s)	Producer(s)	Length
13.	"Crazy Little Thing Called Love" (acoustic)	Freddie Mercury	Lange	3:14
Total length:				43:41

Re-issue bonus track
No.	Title	Writer(s)	Producer(s)	Length
13.	"Moves like Jagger" (featuring Christina Aguilera)	Levine; Benjamin Levin; Ammar Malik; Shellback	Benny Blanco; Shellback	3:23
Total length:				43:47

Deluxe edition bonus tracks
No.	Title	Writer(s)	Producer(s)	Length
13.	"Last Chance"	Levine; Farrar	Robert John "Mutt" Lange	3:09
14.	"No Curtain Call"	Levine; Carmichael; Harmony David Samuels	Lange	3:46
15.	"Never Gonna Leave This Bed" (acoustic)	Levine	Sam Farrar, Noah Passovoy	3:22
16.	"Misery" (acoustic)	Levine; Carmichael; Farrar	Sam Farrar, Noah Passovoy	3:46
17.	"If I Ain't Got You" (live)	Alicia Keys		4:01
18.	"Crazy Little Thing Called Love" (acoustic)	Mercury	Lange	3:14

International digital special edition bonus track
No.	Title	Writer(s)	Length
19.	"Sweetest Goodbye" (live)	Levine	8:10

iTunes Store deluxe edition bonus tracks
No.	Title	Writer(s)	Producer(s)	Length
19.	"The Air That I Breathe"	Levine; Valentine; Tommy King	Robert John "Mutt" Lange	4:17
20.	"Last Chance" (live)	Levine; Farrar	Lange	3:12

Japan deluxe edition bonus track
No.	Title	Writer(s)	Length
19.	"Wake Up Call" (live)	Levine; Valentine	4:03

Asia tour edition bonus tracks
No.	Title	Writer(s)	Length
19.	"The Way You Look Tonight"	Dorothy Fields; Jerome Kern	3:24
20.	"The Air That I Breathe"	Levine; Valentine; Tommy King	4:18
21.	"Happy Xmas (War Is Over)"	John Lennon; Yoko Ono	3:28
22.	"Misery" (Bimbo Jones mix)	Levine; Carmichael; Farrar	2:57

== Personnel ==
All credits are based on the liner notes of Hands All Over as well as the documentary "Vevey Forever".

Maroon 5

- Adam Levine – vocals, guitars, keyboards
- Jesse Carmichael – keyboards, guitars
- Mickey Madden – bass
- James Valentine – guitars
- Matt Flynn – drums, percussion

Additional musicians

- Lady Antebellum – featured artist (track 12)
- Christina Aguilera – featured vocals (track 13 on re-issue)
- Chad Hugo – programming
- Eric Ivan Rosse – programming
- Bruce Bouton – guitar (12)
- Lenny Castro – percussion
- Shawn Tellez – songwriting (track 8)
- Tommy "Boom Boom" King – keyboards (If I Ain't Got You, live versions of Wake Up Call & Last Chance), songwriting ("The Air That I Breathe")
- Harmony David Samuels – songwriting (No Curtain Call)

Production

- Robert John "Mutt" Lange – production
- Shellback – production, programming, songwriting ("Moves like Jagger")
- Benny Blanco – production, songwriting (Moves like Jagger")
- Mike Shipley – mixing (1–12, Last Chance, No Curtain Call, The Air That I Breathe), additional recording (3–5, 7, 8)
- Serbana Ghenea – mixing ("Moves like Jagger")
- Olle Romo – recording engineer & Pro-Tools engineer
- Scott Cooke – additional percussion editing
- Brian Wohlgemuth – assistant Pro-Tools engineer
- Sam Farrar – additional producer, composer, engineer, programming
- Noah "Mailbox" Passovoy – additional producer, composer, engineer, programming
- Isha Erskine – additional engineer
- Brad Blackwood – mastering
- Martin Cooke – additional engineer ("Misery (acoustic)", "Never Gonna Leave This Bed (acoustic)", "Crazy Little Thing Called Love")
- Jim Ebdon – mixing & recording ("If I Ain't Got You")

Photography

- Rosie Hardy – front and back cover photography
- Autumn de Wilde – booklet cover photography
- Travis Schneider – inner booklet and back booklet cover photography
- Lauren Dukoff – back cover portrait photography
- Davis Factor – back cover portrait photography

Additional personnel

- Jordan Feldstein – management
- Ben Berkman – A&R
- Jeff Worob – legal
- Brian Manning – USA booking
- Rod MacSween – international booking
- Chris Dalston – international booking
- Richard Feldstein – business management
- Aristotle Circa – wardrobe stylist
- Denika Bedrossian – grooming
- Kelly Henson – grooming
- Shaul – hair

== Charts ==
=== Weekly charts ===
Weekly chart performance for Hands All Over
Chart (2010–2011)	Peak position
Australian Albums (ARIA)	7
Austrian Albums (Ö3 Austria)	20
Belgian Albums (Ultratop Flanders)	48
Belgian Albums (Ultratop Wallonia)	21
Canadian Albums (Billboard)	5
Danish Albums (Hitlisten)	20
Dutch Albums (Album Top 100)	8
European Top 100 Albums (Billboard)	7
Finnish Albums (Suomen virallinen lista)	46
French Albums (SNEP)	16
German Albums (Offizielle Top 100)	17
Greek Albums (IFPI)	7
Hungarian Albums (MAHASZ)	18
Irish Albums (IRMA)	13
Italian Albums (FIMI)	10
Japanese Albums (Oricon)	3
Mexican Albums (Top 100 Mexico)	19
New Zealand Albums (RMNZ)	12
Polish Albums (ZPAV)	49
Portuguese Albums (AFP)	18
Scottish Albums (Official Charts)	10
South Korean Albums (Circle)	6
South Korean International Albums (Circle)	2
Spanish Albums (Promusicae)	23
Swedish Albums (Sverigetopplistan)	50
Swiss Albums (Schweizer Hitparade)	10
UK Albums (Official Charts)	6
US Billboard 200	2

2021 weekly chart performance for Hands All Over
Chart (2021)	Peak position
Japan Download Albums (Billboard Japan)	76

=== Year-end charts ===
2010 year-end chart performance for Hands All Over
Chart (2010)	Position
Japanese Albums (Oricon)	87
Russian Albums (2M)	140
South Korean International Albums (Circle) Deluxe edition	11
US Billboard 200	118

2011 year-end chart performance for Hands All Over
Chart (2011)	Position
Australian Albums (ARIA)	91
Canadian Albums (Billboard)	50
French Albums (SNEP)	96
South Korean International Albums (Circle) Korea Tour edition	38
UK Albums (OCC)	66
US Billboard 200	62

2012 year-end chart performance for Hands All Over
Chart (2012)	Position
South Korean International Albums (Circle) International standard edition	38
UK Albums (OCC)	131
US Billboard 200	46

== Certifications and sales ==
Certifications and sales for Hands All Over
Region	Certification	Certified units/sales
Australia (ARIA)	Platinum	70,000^{‡}
Brazil (Pro-Música Brasil)	Gold	20,000^{*}
Canada (Music Canada)	Platinum	80,000^{^}
Denmark (IFPI Danmark)	Platinum	20,000^{‡}
France (SNEP)	Gold	50,000^{*}
Italy (FIMI)	Gold	25,000^{‡}
Japan (RIAJ)	Gold	100,000^{^}
Mexico (AMPROFON)	3× Platinum+Gold	210,000^{^}
Philippines (PARI)	2× Platinum	30,000^{*}
Singapore (RIAS)	Platinum	10,000^{*}
South Korea	—	23,000
United Kingdom (BPI)	Platinum	413,034
United States (RIAA)	Platinum	1,000,000^{^}
^{*} Sales figures based on certification alone.^{^} Shipments figures based on certification alone.^{‡} Sales+streaming figures based on certification alone.

== Release history ==
Release history and formats for Hands All Over
Region	Date	Label	Format
Japan	September 15, 2010	Universal International	CD; digital download
South Korea	September 16, 2010	Universal Music	CD; digital download
Germany	September 17, 2010	A&M Octone	CD; digital download
Austria	September 17, 2010	A&M Octone	CD; digital download
Switzerland	September 17, 2010	A&M Octone	CD; digital download
Australia	September 17, 2010	A&M Octone	CD; digital download
United Kingdom	September 20, 2010	Polydor	CD; digital download
France	September 20, 2010	Polydor	CD; digital download
United States	September 21, 2010	A&M Octone	CD; digital download
Brazil	September 21, 2010	Universal Music	CD; digital download
India	October 1, 2010	Universal Music	CD
China	October 1, 2010	Universal Music	CD
United States	July 12, 2011	A&M Octone	CD; digital download "(re-release)"
South Korea	July 14, 2011	Universal Music	CD; digital download "(re-release)"
Germany	August 26, 2011	A&M Octone	CD; digital download "(re-release)"
United Kingdom	September 5, 2011	Polydor	CD; digital download "(re-release)"
Poland	September 30, 2011	Universal Music	CD; digital download "(re-release)"
Japan	October 5, 2011	Universal International	CD; digital download "(re-release)"
