= It Won't Be Soon Before Long Tour =

2007–2008 concert tour by Maroon 5

- Tour by Maroon 5
- Promotional poster for the tour
- Associated album: It Won't Be Soon Before Long
- Start date: September 29, 2007
- End date: December 17, 2008
- Legs: 10
- No. of shows: 93

Maroon 5 concert chronology
- Songs About Jane Tour
  (2003–2005)
- It Won't Be Soon Before Long Tour
  (2007–2008)
- 2008 Summer Tour
  (2008)
| 2008 Summer Tour (2008) | It Won't Be Soon Before Long Tour (2007–2008) | Palm Trees & Power Lines Tour (2010) |

The It Won't Be Soon Before Long Tour was the third concert tour by the American pop rock band Maroon 5, in support of their second studio album, It Won't Be Soon Before Long (2007). The tour began on September 29, 2007 in Auburn Hills, Michigan and concluded on December 17, 2008 in Cape Town, South Africa, comprising 93 concerts.

== Opening acts ==
- OneRepublic
- Sara Bareilles
- Brandi Carlile
- Ry Cuming
- Kanye West
- Kevin Michael
- Dashboard Confessional
- Phantom Planet
- Duran Duran
- Martin Solveig
- Los Claxons
- Soft
- The Hives
- Captain Stu
- Goldfish
- The Parlotones

== Setlist ==
2007
1. "If I Never See Your Face Again"
2. "Makes Me Wonder"
3. "Harder to Breathe"
4. "The Sun"
5. "Can't Stop"
6. "Secret"
7. "In the Air Tonight" (Phil Collins cover)
8. "Shiver"
9. "Wake Up Call"
10. "Sunday Morning"
11. "Won't Go Home Without You"
12. "This Love"
13. "Little of Your Time"
14. "She Will Be Loved"
15. "Back at Your Door"
2008
1. "This Love"
2. "If I Never See Your Face Again"
3. "Makes Me Wonder"
4. "Tangled"
5. "Roxanne" (The Police cover) / "The Sun"
6. "Be My Baby" (The Ronettes cover) / "Won't Go Home Without You"
7. "Secret"
8. "Kiwi"
9. "Shiver"
10. "Harder to Breathe"
11. "Wake Up Call"
12. "Sunday Morning"
13. "Wicked Game" (Chris Isaak cover) / "She Will Be Loved"
14. "Sweetest Goodbye"

== Shows ==
| Date | City | Country | Venue |
2007
North America
| September 29 | Auburn Hills | United States | The Palace of Auburn Hills |
| October 1 | Saint Paul | United States | Xcel Energy Center |
| October 2 | Rosemont | United States | Allstate Arena |
| October 4 | Toronto | Canada | Air Canada Centre |
| October 5 | Cleveland | United States | Quicken Loans Arena |
| October 7 | Columbus | United States | Nationwide Arena |
| October 8 | Charlottesville | United States | John Paul Jones Arena |
| October 10 | New York City | United States | Madison Square Garden |
| October 12 | Uncasville | United States | Mohegan Sun Arena |
| October 13 | Philadelphia | United States | Wachovia Spectrum |
| October 15 | Boston | United States | TD Banknorth Garden |
| October 16 | Washington, D.C. | United States | Verizon Center |
| October 18 | Columbia | United States | Colonial Center |
| October 20 | Sunrise | United States | BankAtlantic Center |
| October 21 | Tampa | United States | St. Pete Times Forum |
| October 23 | Orlando | United States | Amway Arena |
| October 24 | Duluth | United States | The Arena @ Gwinnett Center |
| October 26 | Houston | United States | Toyota Center |
| October 27 | Fort Worth | United States | FWCC Arena |
| October 29 | Denver | United States | Pepsi Center |
| October 30 | Denver | United States | Pepsi Center |
| November 3 | Vancouver | Canada | Pacific Coliseum |
| November 5 | Sacramento | United States | ARCO Arena |
| November 6 | San Jose | United States | HP Pavilion at San Jose |
| November 8 | Los Angeles | United States | Staples Center |
| November 9 | San Diego | United States | Cox Arena |
| November 10 | Las Vegas | United States | The Pearl Concert Theater |
Europe
| November 25 | Nottingham | England | Nottingham Arena |
| November 27 | Glasgow | Scotland | S.E.C.C. Hall 4 |
| November 28 | Manchester | England | Manchester Evening News Arena |
| November 29 | Newcastle | England | Metro Radio Arena |
| December 1 | Birmingham | England | NEC Arena |
| December 2 | London | England | Wembley Arena |
| December 5 | Brighton | England | Brighton Centre |
| December 7 | Paris | France | Palais Omnisports |
| December 8 | Den Bosch | Netherlands | Brabanthallen |
| December 9 | Antwerp | Belgium | Lotto Arena |
| December 11 | Copenhagen | Denmark | KB Hallen |
| December 12 | Hamburg | Germany | Alsterdorfer Sporthalle |
| December 14 | Vienna | Austria | Wiener Stadthalle |
| December 15 | Munich | Germany | Zenith |
| December 16 | Milan | Italy | Alcatraz |
| December 17 | Winterthur | Switzerland | Eulachhalle |
2008
Asia
| March 3 | Bangkok | Thailand | Impact Arena |
| March 5 | Quezon City | Philippines | Araneta Coliseum |
| March 7 | Seoul | South Korea | Olympic Gymnastics Arena |
| March 10 | Tokyo | Japan | Nippon Budokan |
| March 11 | Tokyo | Japan | Nippon Budokan |
| March 13 | Osaka | Japan | Osaka-jō Hall |
| March 15 | Hiroshima | Japan | Hiroshima Sun Plaza |
| March 16 | Kuala Lumpur | Malaysia | Bukit Kiara Equestrian Park |
| March 19 | Hong Kong | | AsiaWorld–Arena |
| March 22 | Shanghai | China | Shanghai International Gymnastics Center |
| March 25 | Singapore | | Singapore Indoor Stadium |
Oceania
| March 28 | Perth | Australia | Burswood Dome |
| March 30 | Melbourne | Australia | Rod Laver Arena |
| March 31 | Adelaide | Australia | Adelaide Entertainment Centre |
| April 2 | Brisbane | Australia | Brisbane Entertainment Centre |
| April 4 | Sydney | Australia | Acer Arena |
North America
| May 10 | San Antonio | United States | Sunset Station |
| May 11 | Austin | United States | Austin Music Hall |
| May 15 | Maplewood | United States | The Myth |
| May 16 | Camden | United States | Susquehanna Bank Center |
| May 18 | Boston | United States | Tweeter Center for the Performing Arts |
Europe
| May 24 (Note: The concert on May 24, 2008 in Madrid was part of the MTV Day 2008.) | Madrid | Spain | Plaza de Toros de Las Ventas |
| May 26 | Grenoble | France | Paul Mistral Park |
| May 28 | Marseille | France | Old Port of Marseille |
| May 29 | Montpellier | France | Place de I'Europe |
| May 30 | Toulouse | France | Capitole de Toulouse |
| June 3 | Bordeaux | France | Place de la Victoire |
| June 5 | Tours | France | Anatole Place |
| June 6 | Amiens | France | Parc de La Hotoie |
| June 7 | Vaud | Switzerland | Crans |
| June 10 | Dijon | France | Mail de Laborde |
| June 12 | Besançon | France | Parking Chamars |
| June 13 | Paris | France | L'Olympia Bruno Coquatrix |
| June 14 | Saint Germain | France | Issy Les Moulineaux |
North America
| June 27 (Note: The concert on June 27, 2008 in New York was part of Good Morning America's Summer Concert Series.) | New York | United States | Bryant Park |
Latin America
| November 2 | Monterrey | Mexico | Arena Monterrey |
| November 3 | Guadalajara | Mexico | Auditorio Telmex |
| November 4 | Mexico City | Mexico | Palacio de los Deportes |
| November 7 | Rio de Janeiro | Brazil | HSBC Arena |
| November 8 (Note: The concert on November 8, 2008 in Santa Luzia was part of the 2008 Pop Rock Brasil Festival.) | Santa Luzia | Brazil | Mega Space |
| November 9 | São Paulo | Brazil | Via Funchal |
| November 11 | Buenos Aires | Argentina | Estadio Luna Park |
| November 12 | Santiago | Chile | Movistar Arena |
| November 15 | Caracas | Venezuela | Estadio de Fútbol de la USB |
| November 18 | Panama City | Panama | Figali Convention Center |
| November 20 | Bogotá | Colombia | Coliseo Cubierto El Campin |
Middle East
| December 10 | Dubai | United Arab Emirates | Dubai Media City Amphitheater |
Africa
| December 13 | Johannesburg | South Africa | Coca-Cola Dome |
| December 14 | Durban | South Africa | ICC Durban Arena |
| December 17 | Cape Town | South Africa | Grand West Arena |

== Cancelled shows ==
List of cancelled concerts, showing date, city, country, venue and reason for cancellation
| Date | City | Country | Venue | Reason |
2007
| October 30 | Salt Lake City | United States | EnergySolutions Arena | Moved to Pepsi Center. |
| November 2 | Portland | United States | Veterans Memorial Coliseum | Scheduling conflict. |
| December 17 | Zürich | Switzerland | Hallenstadion | Moved to Eulachhalle. |
| December 18 | Milan | Italy | PalaSharp | Due to unforeseen circumstances. |
| December 20 | Stuttgart | Germany | Porsche-Arena | Due to unforeseen circumstances. |
| December 21 | Frankfurt | Germany | Jahrhunderthalle | Due to unforeseen circumstances. |
| December 22 | Düsseldorf | Germany | Philipshalle | Due to unforeseen circumstances. |
2008
| April 6 | Auckland | New Zealand | Vector Arena | Scheduling conflict. |
| April 18 | Salt Lake City | United States | Rice-Eccles Stadium | Logistical issues. |
