= Never Gonna Leave This Bed =

Single by Maroon 5

from the album Hands All Over
- Released: January 24, 2011
- Genre: Pop rock, alternative rock
- Length: 3:16
- Label: A&M Octone
- Songwriter: Adam Levine
- Producer: Robert John "Mutt" Lange

Maroon 5 singles chronology
"Give a Little More" (2010)	"Never Gonna Leave This Bed" (2011)	"Moves like Jagger" (2011)

Music video
- "Never Gonna Leave This Bed" on YouTube

"Never Gonna Leave This Bed" is a song performed by American pop rock band Maroon 5, taken from their third studio album, Hands All Over (2010). The song is a ballad and was written by frontman Adam Levine and produced by Robert John "Mutt" Lange. It was released as the third single by A&M Octone Records. It was released in Australia in January 2011. The song was later released to the US mainstream radio on May 17, 2011.

The song received positive reviews from most music critics, who complimented the track's lyric and its sweet sound. It has gained significant airplay on U.S. radio and has charted on the Billboard Hot 100 and Adult Pop Songs, while reaching the top five on the latter. The music video features Russian model Anne Vyalitsyna (Adam Levine's then-girlfriend) and sees Levine snuggling with her on beds in various Los Angeles settings, as passersby give them curious looks.

== Background ==
Frontman Adam Levine wrote this song after a "weekend bender". He told The Sun September 17, 2010: "I was totally depleted and got home, picked up a guitar and started writing this song. It's my favourite on the record. It's the most honest. It reflects a desperate longing to have somebody in my life, which I didn't at the time."

== Critical reception ==
Jakof Dorof from Slant Magazine said that: "The band turns in career highlights with the harmony-laden "Never Gonna Leave This Bed." Sarah Rodman from The Boston Globe said that: ""Never Gonna Leave This Bed" nails the hunger to prolong the perfect moment with an intoxicating partner with its sweet, sexy swing". IGN said: "the romance-friendly track "Never Gonna Leave This Bed," has a Keane-like feel". Leah Greenblatt from Entertainment Weekly opined that: "Levine's romantic roundelay trundles on the Train-ish midrange balladry (Never Gonna Leave This Bed)".

== Music video ==
The music video for the song was shot on January 12, 2011, at several different places including Santa Monica and downtown Los Angeles, California. The video shows scenes of Levine and Vyalitsyna in three different bed settings, including one at a pier on the beach of Santa Monica, another on Broadway in Los Angeles, and a third setting in an upper floor of the Hilton Hotel. The video also features the band performing in a glass truck from Aardvark Event Logistics, alternatively while driving down a highway during the day, and on a busy street in downtown Los Angeles at night, while onlookers take photos. The video premiered on Just Jared on February 4, 2011, and the day after on VH1 Top 20 Video Countdown. The video hit number seven on the Yahoo! Video chart published by Billboard. It was directed by Tim Nackashi.

=== Reception ===
Chris Ryan wrote for MTV that "It's a gorgeously shot and sunny video for a slightly melancholy but incredibly catchy song." The band sections were compared to a "sort of concert to-go".

== Live performances ==
Maroon 5 performed the song on The Tonight Show with Jay Leno on January 17, 2011. The band also performed it on the Super Bowl XLV pre-show and DirecTV Celebrity Beach Bowl in February 2011, the Logie Awards of 2011, on May 1, 2011 and on The Today Show on August 4, 2011. The song was played for the Hands All Over Tour and the 2011 Summer Tour. The song was also featured on the band's iTunes Session EP, released on February 8, 2011.

== Track listing ==
Standard version
No.	Title	Length
1.	"Never Gonna Leave This Bed"	3:16
2.	"Never Gonna Leave This Bed (Serban Pop Mix)"	3:16

== Chart performance ==
In late January 2011, the song was listed under Cool New Music on All Access in the Hot Adult Contemporary section and in early February 2011, it started gaining airplay there, even though an official Hot AC radio adds date never came to fruition. The song debuted at #35 on the Billboard's Adult Pop Songs chart and reached a peak of #4. On the week of May 14, the song entered the Hot 100 at #100, reaching a peak of #55. It also charted on the Belgian, Hungary, Netherlands and Slovakia charts.

== Charts and certifications ==
=== Weekly charts ===
Chart (2011)	Peak position
Belgium (Ultratip Bubbling Under Flanders)	14
Canada Hot AC (Billboard)	18
CIS Airplay (TopHit)	156
Hungary (Rádiós Top 40)	29
Israel International Airplay (Media Forest)	9
Italian Airplay (EarOne)	90
Netherlands (Dutch Top 40)	29
France (SNEP)	82
Slovakia Airplay (ČNS IFPI)	61
US Billboard Hot 100	55
US Adult Contemporary (Billboard)	17
US Adult Pop Airplay (Billboard)	4
US Pop Airplay (Billboard)	25

=== Year-end charts ===
Chart (2011)	Position
US Adult Contemporary	44
US Adult Pop Songs	13

=== Certifications ===
Region	Certification	Certified units/sales
Brazil (Pro-Música Brasil)	Gold	30,000^{‡}
United States (RIAA)	Platinum	1,000,000^{^}
^{^} Shipments figures based on certification alone.^{‡} Sales+streaming figures based on certification alone.

== Release history ==
Region	Date	Format	Ref.
Australia	January 24, 2011	Adult contemporary	
United States	May 17, 2011	Mainstream radio	
