= Maroon 5 =

American pop rock band

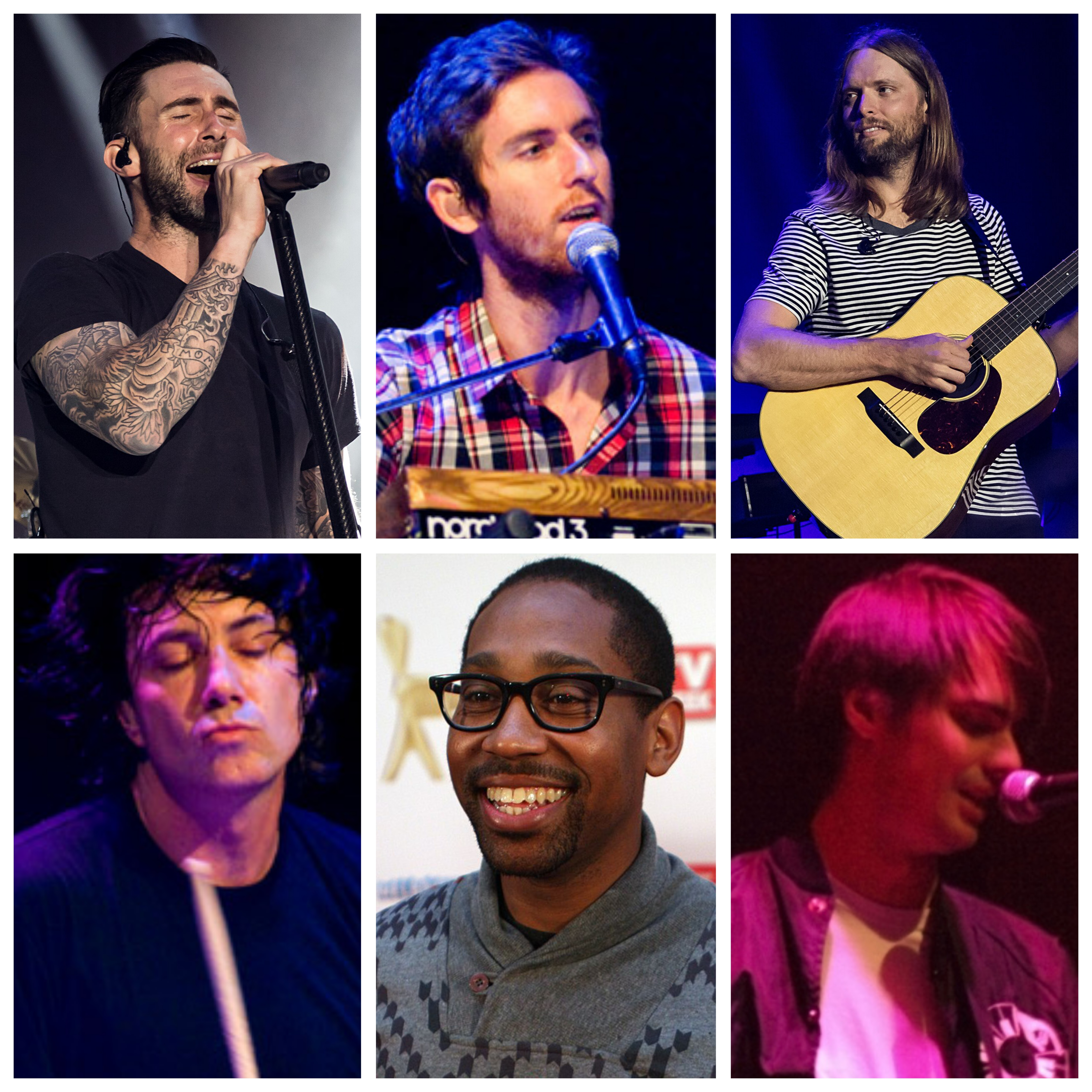
- Lineup of Maroon 5 since 2020. Clockwise from top left: Adam Levine, Jesse Carmichael, James Valentine, Sam Farrar, PJ Morton, Matt Flynn

Background information
- Also known as: Kara's Flowers (1994–2001); Maroon (2001)
- Origin: Los Angeles, California, U.S.
- Genres: Pop; pop rock; funk rock; blue-eyed soul; dance-pop
- Works: Discography; songs
- Years active: 1994–present
- Labels: Warner Bros.; So Many; Reprise; Universal; J; A&M Octone; 222; Interscope; Polydor
- Spinoffs: Phases; Operation Aloha; 1863; Collapsing Scenery; Circuit Jerks
- Awards: Full list
- Members: Adam Levine; Jesse Carmichael; James Valentine; Matt Flynn; PJ Morton; Sam Farrar
- Past members: Ryan Dusick; Mickey Madden
- Website: www.maroon5.com

Maroon 5 is an American pop rock band formed in Los Angeles, California. It consists of lead vocalist and guitarist Adam Levine, rhythm guitarist and keyboardist Jesse Carmichael, lead guitarist James Valentine, drummer Matt Flynn, keyboardist PJ Morton, and bassist and keyboardist Sam Farrar. Original members Levine, Carmichael, bassist Mickey Madden, and drummer Ryan Dusick first came together as Kara's Flowers in February 1994, while they were in high school.

After self-releasing their independent album ...We Like Digging?, Kara's Flowers signed to Reprise Records and released their debut studio album, The Fourth World (1997). It garnered a tepid response, after which the record label dropped the band and the members focused on college. In 2001, the band re-emerged as Maroon 5, adding guitarist Valentine. Signed to Octone Records, they released their first album as Maroon 5, titled Songs About Jane (2002). Aided by the hit singles "Harder to Breathe", "This Love" and "She Will Be Loved", the album peaked at number six on the Billboard 200 chart and went quadruple platinum in 2005. In the same year, the band won the Grammy Award for Best New Artist. In 2006, Dusick left the band after suffering from serious wrist and shoulder injuries and was replaced by Flynn. Maroon 5's second album, It Won't Be Soon Before Long (2007), debuted atop the US Billboard 200 chart; its lead single, "Makes Me Wonder", topped the US Billboard Hot 100.

The band's acclaimed third album, Hands All Over (2010), was re-released in 2011 with the US number-one "Moves Like Jagger". In 2012, Carmichael took a break from the band and was replaced by keyboardist Morton. Maroon 5's fourth album Overexposed (2012), spawned the single "One More Night", which topped the Billboard Hot 100 for nine consecutive weeks. In 2014, Carmichael rejoined the band alongside Morton to record the fifth album V (roman numeral pronounced "five"), released on Interscope Records and Levine's own label 222 Records, and reaching number one on the Billboard 200. In 2016, Maroon 5 added long-time collaborator Farrar to their official lineup as the band continued for their sixth studio album Red Pill Blues (2017). V and Red Pill Blues's respective singles "Sugar" and "Girls Like You" peaked at numbers two and one in the US respectively.

Madden announced his departure from the band in 2020 following his arrest on domestic violence charges, with Farrar becoming their new bassist. Their following albums, Jordi (2021) and Love Is Like (2025), saw varying critical and commercial success. Maroon 5 has sold more than 135 million records, making them one of the best-selling music acts of all time. The band has won numerous accolades, including three Grammy Awards and three American Music Awards.

== History ==
=== 1994–2001: Kara's Flowers and the formation of Maroon 5 ===
Maroon 5 was formed as Kara's Flowers in Los Angeles, California, in 1994. Lead vocalist and guitarist Adam Levine was introduced to drummer Ryan Dusick by a mutual friend and guitarist, Adam Salzman. Levine was 15 years old, and Dusick was 16. Three of the five members of the band started playing together at age 12. The four original members of the band met while attending Brentwood School in Los Angeles. While attending Brentwood School, Levine and guitarist Jesse Carmichael joined with bassist Mickey Madden and Dusick to form Kara's Flowers. The name was taken from a girl that went to their high school that the band had a "collective crush" on. The band independently released an album, ...We Like Digging?, in late 1994.

The band would play many shows through the next few years, and would also record their official debut. While they were playing a beach party in Malibu, independent producer Tommy Allen heard them play and offered to manage them and record a complete record with his partner, songwriter John DeNicola, who is known for his work on Dirty Dancing (1987) – including "(I've Had) The Time of My Life". Producer Rob Cavallo's management team heard the record Allen and DeNicola produced, which eventually led Cavallo to offer them a deal with Reprise Records, re-recording the album. However, after the release of The Fourth World, during Levine and Madden's senior year of high school in 1997, it had morphed into a band with an alternative rock, indie rock and power pop style. Despite high expectations from the band and record company, the album failed to catch on and their lead single, "Soap Disco", was a failure. According to Levine, the failure of the album was "a huge disappointment" that nearly led them to break up. The album sold around 5,000 copies and the band was dropped after six months.

Between 2000 and 2001, the band would play very sporadic shows, due to the members going to college. Dusick and Madden attended college locally at University of California, Los Angeles, while Levine and Carmichael relocated to the East coast to attend Five Towns College, in Dix Hills, Long Island, New York. While Levine and Carmichael were in New York, they began to take notice of the urban music surrounding them and later let the style influence the songs they wrote. Kara's Flowers competed in the 2000 UCLA Spring Sing competition, losing to Sara Bareilles.

When the band returned in 2001, they brought those influences with them. Frequent collaborator and future member Sam Farrar (then only the bassist of the band Phantom Planet) explained that the Aaliyah song "Are You That Somebody?" affected the band and influenced the song "Not Coming Home". Producer Tim Sommer signed them to a demo deal with MCA Records and produced three tracks with them in Los Angeles in the middle of 2001, with Mark Dearnley engineering. Against Sommer's advice, MCA declined to pick up the band, and these tracks were never released. The band put together a demo that was rejected by several labels, before acquired by Octone Records executives James Diener, Ben Berkman and David Boxenbaum. While looking for talent for the Octone label, Berkman was given a bunch of demos by the brother of a former colleague at Columbia Records and the song that caught his attention was "Sunday Morning", which he referred to as a "genius song". Berkman was surprised the song was credited to Kara's Flowers, because the band sounded completely different from the one he had heard while at Warner Bros. Records.

Berkman encouraged Diener and Boxenbaum to fly out to Los Angeles to watch a showcase gig at The Viper Room for the four-piece Kara's Flowers. After watching Levine onstage, they were convinced. Berkman believed what the band needed was a "fifth member to play the guitar and free up the singer, so he could be the star I perceived him to be". Octone insisted that the band change its name to break with its pop past. The label began looking for a full-time guitarist to enable Levine to focus on performing as the frontman. James Valentine (from the L.A. band Square) was recruited as the band's fifth member. On his joining the band, Valentine commented: "I became friends with them and we sort of started jamming together, it was very much like I was cheating on my band, we were having sort of an affair and I eventually quit my other band to join up with them." After hearing Levine play, Valentine noticed his affinity for Phish and the two musicians bonded over the band. After briefly being known as simply "Maroon", the band changed their name to "Maroon 5". In an interview with Howard Stern, Levine revealed that the only person outside of the band to know the story behind the name change is Billy Joel.

=== 2002–2006: Songs About Jane and Dusick's departure ===
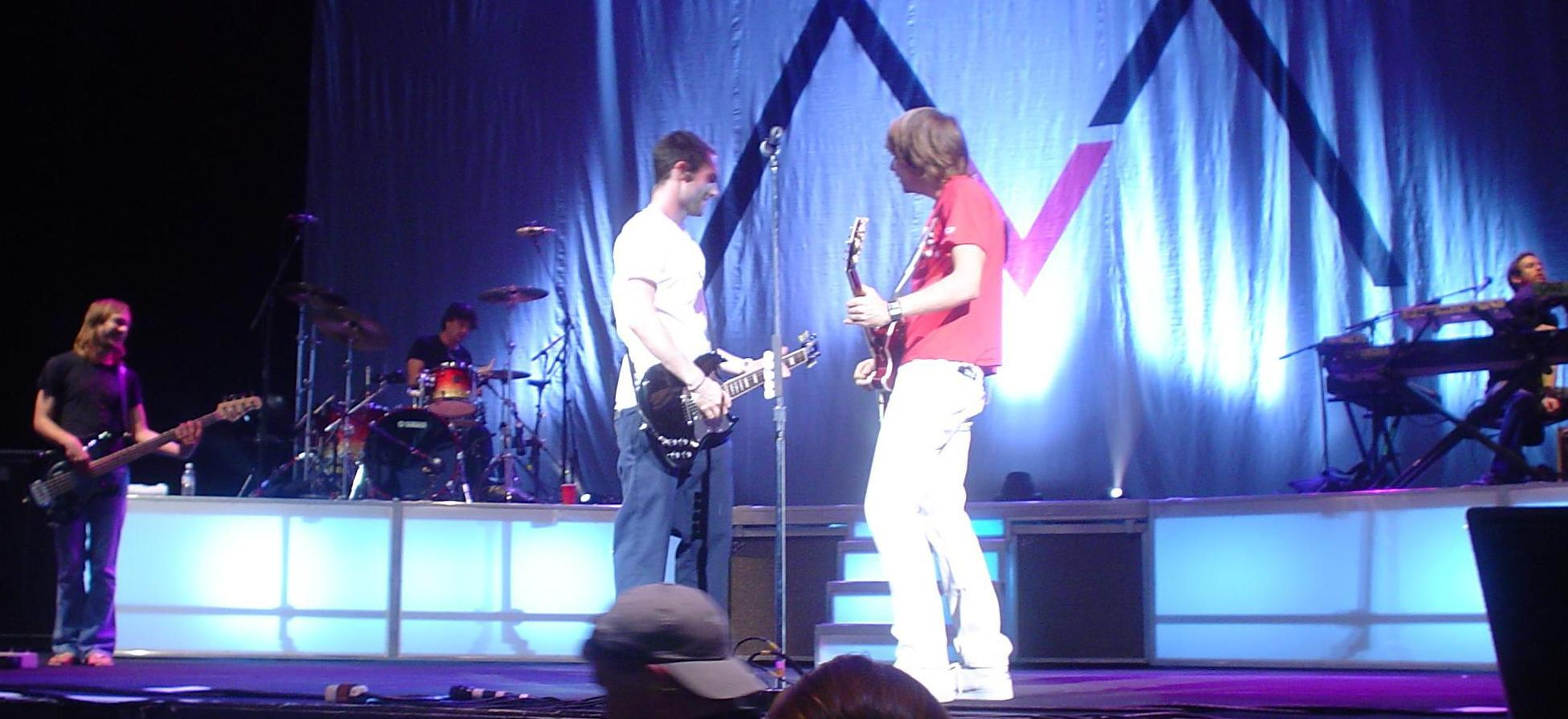
Maroon 5 in concert in 2004

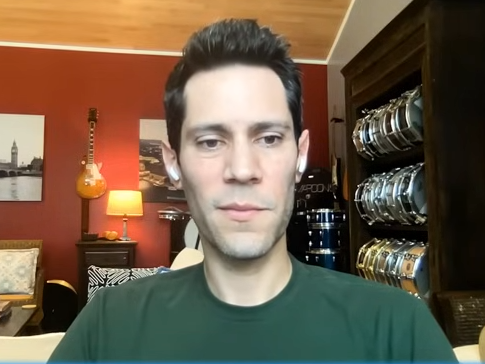
Original drummer Ryan Dusick (pictured in 2020) left the band in 2006 due to burnout from touring

James Valentine attended Berklee College of Music with John Mayer in 1996, where they developed a rapport. In 2002, the two reconnected at a Mayer radio broadcast. After Mayer heard their album, he was so impressed (particularly by "This Love", which became the most successful release off the album) that he invited them to open for him during his early 2003 tour. The first single, "Harder to Breathe", slowly started to pick up airplay which helped sales of the album. By March 2004, the album had reached the Top 20 of the Billboard 200 and "Harder to Breathe" had made the Top 20 on the Billboard Hot 100 singles charts. The album peaked at number six on the Billboard 200 in September 2004, 26 months after its release; this was the longest period between an album's release and its initial Top 10 appearance since SoundScan results were included in the Billboard 200 in 1991. The album went on to sell over 10 million copies worldwide. Mayer invited the band to open for him again in 2004. Over the next three years, the band toured, including visits to seventeen countries. During this time, the band toured with Michelle Branch, Graham Colton, and the Rolling Stones. Other acts the band toured alongside included Gavin DeGraw, Matchbox Twenty, Sugar Ray, Counting Crows, Phantom Planet, the Hives, Dashboard Confessional, Simon Dawes, the Thrills, Thirsty Merc, Marc Broussard, the Donnas, the RedWest, Michael Tolcher, and Guster. It was also during this time that drummer Matt Flynn, who played with Gavin DeGraw and The B-52's, began accompanying the band at concerts.

Between the time that we started making the album [Songs About Jane] in 2001 and the time the album reached the crest of its success in 2004, we went from being starving musicians wondering what the future held to riding a wave of success beyond our wildest expectations.

— Ryan Dusick, Maroon 5's original drummer, who officially left the band in 2006, due to injuries to his shoulders and wrists sustained from constant touring.

Songs About Jane reached No. 1 on the Australian albums (ARIA), while "Harder to Breathe" made the Top 20 singles charts in the US and UK, and Top 40 in Australia and New Zealand. The album climbed to No. 1 in the UK. The second single, "This Love", reached number five in the US, number three in the UK, and number eight in Australia. The third single, "She Will Be Loved", reached the number five in both the US and the UK, and number one in Australia. The fourth single, "Sunday Morning", reached the Top 40 in the US, UK, and Australia. Maroon 5 played Live 8, in Philadelphia in 2005. Their set included a cover of Neil Young's "Rockin' in the Free World" and frontman Levine performed with Stevie Wonder. On May 13, 2005, the band wrapped up the 2005 Honda Civic Tour, which it headlined. On June 9, 2005, the band performed at the American Film Institute's tribute to filmmaker George Lucas. Lucas himself had selected Maroon 5 for the event, as it was his children's favorite band at the time. Over the years of touring with the band their drummer, percussionist and backing vocalist Ryan Dusick had been suffering from the touring life. The strains of non-stop touring aggravated an old sports injury. After several absences from the tour with Ryland Steen and Josh Day taking his place, Dusick left the band in September 2006. Flynn officially joined the band as its second drummer.

=== 2007–2008: It Won't Be Soon Before Long ===
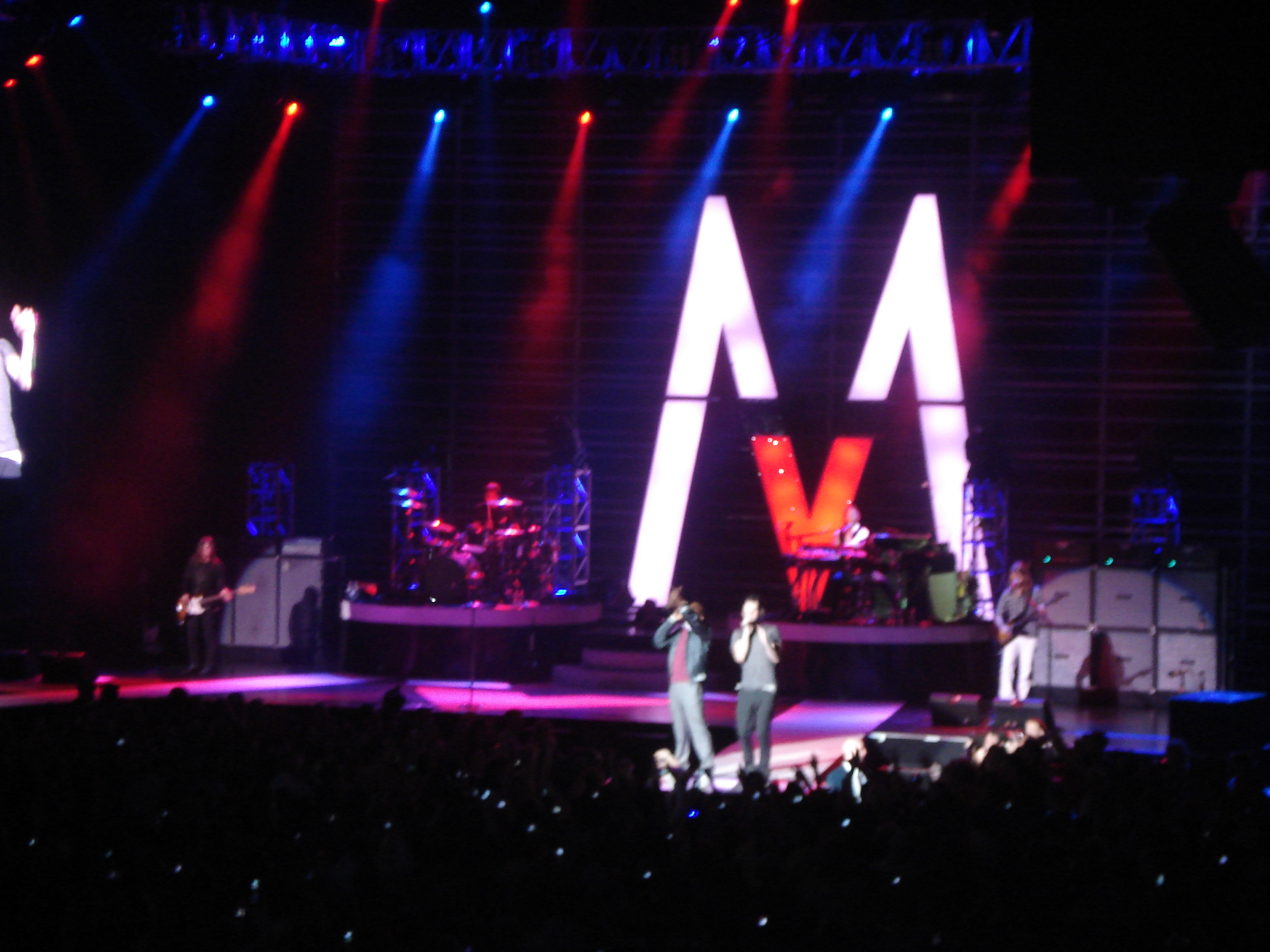
Maroon 5 in Madison Square Garden, New York City in 2007

After recording for eight months, Maroon 5's second album It Won't Be Soon Before Long, was released worldwide in May 2007 by A&M Octone Records. Levine described the follow-up to Songs About Jane is "sexier and stronger", gaining inspiration from iconic 80s artists such as Prince, Shabba Ranks, Michael Jackson and Talking Heads. Ann Powers writing for Los Angeles Times said It Won't Be Soon Before Long is "An icy-hot blend of electro-funk and blue-eyed soul that works its cruel streak with the confidence of Daniel Craig's James Bond". Before its release, "Makes Me Wonder" was the No. 1 selling single and video on iTunes. It was also the No. 1 selling album, with more than 50,000 digital pre-sales. After its release, the album broke iTunes sales records its week of release, selling over 101,000 copies. The first single "Makes Me Wonder", was released to radio March 27, 2007. The song debuted at number 84 on the Billboard Hot 100. In the first week of May, the single skyrocketed from a lowly position of No. 64 to No. 1, the biggest jump in Billboard history at the time. "Makes Me Wonder" has also achieved No. 1 on Billboard's Hot Digital Songs, Pop 100, and Hot Dance Club Play charts.

To support the album, the band performed on a ten-date club tour in which visited small venues in Europe and the United States from April to June 2007. The band followed with a concert that streamed live via MSN Music in mid-June. On July 10, it opened for The Police in Miami, and followed with an acoustic performance at the Miami club, Studio A, the next day. The band headlined the It Won't Be Soon Before Long Tour took place in late 2007, where they toured 28 cities in North America. The tour began September 29 touring in 28 cities in North America and concluded November 10, 2007. The Hives, as the tour's special guest, performed on all of the dates while Sara Bareilles, Kevin Michael and Phantom Planet each performed in a portion of the tour. It toured with Dashboard Confessional in their world tour and on March 28, 2008, it began touring with OneRepublic, Brandi Carlile, and Ry Cuming. The band has performed "Makes Me Wonder" on season 6 and "If I Never See Your Face Again" in season 7 of American Idol, which they also appeared on the show's special edition titled "Idol Gives Back" in the latter season. In May 2008, Maroon 5 released a new duet version of "If I Never See Your Face Again", with Rihanna. It appeared on both the band's re-released second album and Rihanna's re-release of her album Good Girl Gone Bad. The band's song "Goodnight Goodnight", appeared on The CW's fall 2008 advertisement. Maroon 5 also performed with the song in CSI: NY, where they guest star in the fifth season episode "Page Turner" in October 2008.

=== 2009–2012: Hands All Over ===
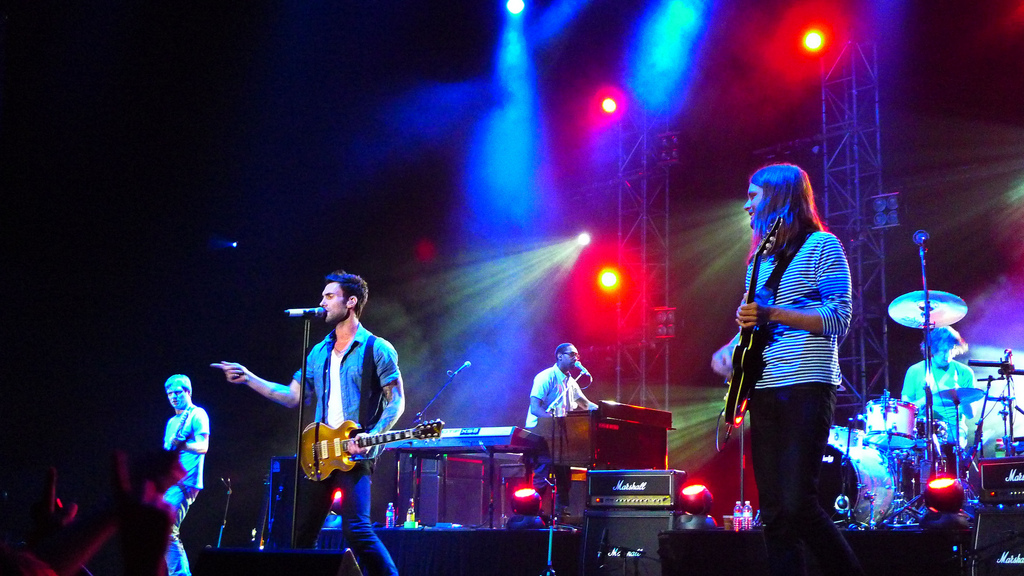
Maroon 5 performing in Hong Kong in May 2011

Levine stated that he believed the band was reaching its peak and may make one more album before disbanding. He explained, "Eventually I want to focus on being a completely different person because I don't know if I want to do this into my 40s and 50s and beyond, like the Rolling Stones". Levine later dispelled any rumors of the band breaking up, saying: "I love what I do and think that, yes, it might be tiring and complicated at times [but] we don't have any plans on disbanding any time soon". In January 2009, Maroon 5 performed at the Renaissance Hotel in Washington, D.C., for the "Declare Yourself" event in honor of the inauguration of President Barack Obama. The band recorded a cover version of "The Way You Look Tonight", which appeared on the Frank Sinatra tribute album His Way, Our Way. It was also included on the soundtrack to the 2010 film Valentine's Day.

Maroon 5's third studio album was recorded in mid 2009 in Switzerland, where the band was joined by record producer Robert John "Mutt" Lange. During the band's time on touring along with artists and groups are served as opening acts for the Back to School Tour in November, with Kate Earl and Fitz and the Tantrums and the Palm Trees & Power Lines Tour in 2010, with OneRepublic, Bruno Mars, Kris Allen, Ry Cuming, VV Brown, Owl City and actor Jason Segel, respectively. The band's third album titled Hands All Over, was released on September 21, 2010. It debuted at number two on the Billboard 200. Despite the high placement on the Billboard 200 only 142,000 copies were sold, which was relatively weak compared to their previous album It Won't Be Soon Before Long, which debuted at number one with 429,000 copies. The album received positive reviews from music critics, with many of them praising it for its production. The first single of the album "Misery", was released on June 22, 2010, and peaking at number 14 on the Billboard Hot 100. In February 2011, Maroon 5 headlined the Super Bowl XLV pre-show with special guest Keith Urban, where the band performing their songs including "Misery" and "Never Gonna Leave This Bed". During a promotion by Coca-Cola in March 2011, the band participated in a special studio session during which, with the help of musician PJ Morton, they only had 24 hours to write a completely original song. After their time was up, the song "Is Anybody Out There" was released on the Coca-Cola website for free download.

On July 12, 2011, the band re-released the album Hands All Over, just to include their summer hit "Moves like Jagger" featuring Christina Aguilera. The song premiered live on The Voice on June 21 and reached the number one position on the Billboard Hot 100 chart in September 2011. Frontman Levine was also featured in the Gym Class Heroes' song "Stereo Hearts" from their album The Papercut Chronicles II, which peaked at number four on the Billboard Hot 100. The band toured with Train for the 2011 Summer Tour from July to September 2011. On September 8, 2011, Jesse Carmichael stated the band was likely to begin recording its next album within the year. On October 1, 2011, the band performed live at the Rock in Rio concert in Rio de Janeiro, Brazil. Maroon 5 was a last hour addition, chosen to fill the vacant spot left by Jay-Z, after he cancelled his appearance for personal reasons. The band launched a Snapple flavor named "Tea Will Be Loved" in support of Feeding America in September 2011.

In November 2011, Maroon 5 performed "Moves Like Jagger" and "Stereo Hearts" with Travie McCoy on Saturday Night Live on November 5. On November 20, 2011, the band also performed the same songs along with Aguilera and Gym Class Heroes at the 2011 American Music Awards, where the band won their first AMA for Favorite Pop Band/Duo/Group. Later, the band played "Moves Like Jagger" at the 2011 Victoria's Secret Fashion Show. The next year, the band also won the 2012 People's Choice Award for Favorite Band, beating Linkin Park and Coldplay. On February 12, 2012, the group performed at the 54th Grammy Awards, alongside Foster the People and the Beach Boys in a medley of the Beach Boys songs to celebrate their 50th anniversary. Later, Maroon 5 contributed with a song written by Glen Hansard called "Come Away to the Water", featuring Rozzi Crane for The Hunger Games soundtrack album.

=== 2012: Carmichael's hiatus and Overexposed ===
On March 9, 2012, Maroon 5 announced that Jesse Carmichael would take a break from performing with the group for an undetermined amount of time to focus more on his studies of "music and the healing arts" and was replaced by a new keyboardist and background vocalist PJ Morton, who had been touring with them since 2010 and who became a full-time band member, as Morton gained little success as an R&B artist.

As Maroon 5 continued to work on their fourth studio album Overexposed, which was released on June 26, 2012. Levine stated that Overexposed is their "most diverse and poppiest album yet". On April 16, Maroon 5 premiered the first single from the album "Payphone", featuring Wiz Khalifa, on the reality competition show The Voice, in which Levine is one of the coaches. "Payphone" debuted at number three on the Billboard Hot 100 chart, eventually peaking at number two. The album's second single "One More Night" was released on June 19, 2012. The song reached number one on the Hot 100, blocking Psy's monster hit "Gangnam Style" from the top spot on the chart for nine consecutive weeks and tied with Carly Rae Jepsen's hit single "Call Me Maybe" for most weeks in the number one spot on the Billboard Hot 100 chart in 2012.

At the start of their Overexposed Tour in South America, Maroon 5 introduced the newest addition in the band to the audience: their old and close friend Sam Farrar on guitars, occasionally on the bass guitar, percussion, additional keyboards, backing vocals and providing samples and other special effects (using the MPC). Farrar co-wrote and co-produced a few of the band's songs on almost all of their studio albums and also remixed their song "Woman" on Call and Response: The Remix Album, released in 2008 (from the Spider-Man 2 soundtrack). On August 31, 2012 – during a show in Argentina – Farrar filled-in for Mickey Madden on the bass guitar for the first time – he subsequently filled-in for Madden on the next few shows of the tour. In July 2012, Maroon 5 began to work on the upcoming fifth studio album, after the commercial success of Overexposed and on October 10, 2012, Jesse Carmichael confirmed that he would be returning to the band after they complete their Overexposed Tour and will rejoin in time to record their fifth studio album.

=== 2013–2016: V, return of Carmichael and lineup changes ===
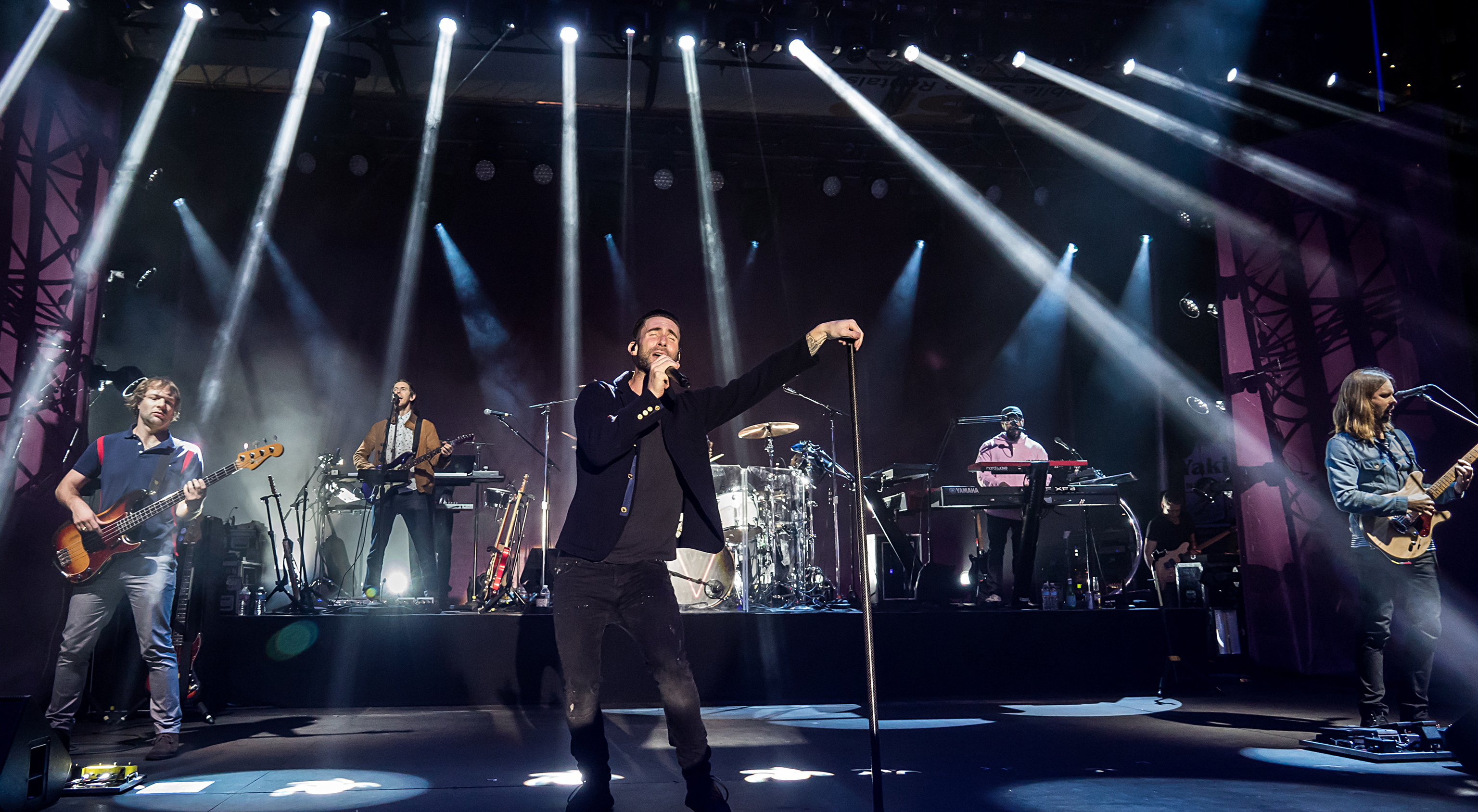
Maroon 5 performing live in 2016.

In April 2013, James Valentine said the band was in the studio recording songs for the fifth album: "The stuff we're working on now, it definitely has gone maybe a little darker in its sound, maybe back a little bit more to what we kind of did on Songs About Jane, but at this point, we do have all kinds of different songs and it is early". The band announced it would headline the 2013 Honda Civic Tour, with special guest Kelly Clarkson. The tour began on August 1, and concluded on October 6, 2013, comprising 33 dates.

In February 2014, Maroon 5 appeared to perform "All My Loving" and "Ticket to Ride" on the CBS show The Night That Changed America: A Grammy Salute to the Beatles, to commemorate the 50th anniversary of the Beatles' arrival in the United States in 1964. On April 15, 2014, Jesse Carmichael confirmed that his hiatus from the band was complete and he reunited with the band in time to record for the album. With Carmichael's return along with PJ Morton, the band's lineup grew to six members.

In May 2014, Maroon 5 transferred from A&M Octone Records, when they signed with Interscope Records (in partnership with Adam Levine's label 222 Records) and announced their fifth studio album V (pronounced: "five"), which was released on September 2, 2014. The album was also released on a limited-edition ZinePak. The album's first single "Maps", was released on June 16, 2014, and peaked number 6 on the Hot 100 chart. On August 10, the band headlined the Hyundai Card City Break, a rock festival in South Korea. At the 2014 MTV Video Music Awards on August 24, 2014, Maroon 5 appeared to perform for the first time with "Maps" and "One More Night". The second single, "Animals" was released on August 25 and peaked at number 3 on the Hot 100 chart. It was featured on the 2015 Kia Soul EV commercial.

The album reached number one on the US Billboard 200 chart on September 10, 2014. V received mixed reviews from critics. Brad Wete, writing for Billboard, said: "Levine's hummingbird vocals and passionate delivery are as earnest as they were on their 2002 debut Songs About Jane." On September 11, 2014, Maroon 5 performed during the 2014 iTunes Festival at the Roundhouse in London, England. Later, the band performed at the Grammy Awards' Christmas special, titled A Very Grammy Christmas on December 5, 2014, and at the iHeartRadio Jingle Ball Tour 2014 on December 12, 2014.

"Sugar" was released as the third single from the album on January 13, 2015. A music video was released on January 14, 2015, where the band traveling around Los Angeles and performing at random weddings. The single reached at number 2 on the Billboard Hot 100. On February 22, 2015, Maroon 5 performed "Lost Stars" at the 87th Academy Awards. The song appeared on the soundtrack of the 2013 film Begin Again (which also stars Levine) and the deluxe edition of the band's album V.

Maroon 5 headlined a worldwide tour titled Maroon V Tour, in support of the album. Throughout the tour, artists Magic!, Rozzi Crane, Matt McAndrew, Tove Lo, R. City and Phases served as the tour's opening acts. On May 11, 2015, the band announced that they were to release their single "This Summer", on May 15, and also appeared on the re-released deluxe edition of the fifth album. Four days later, Maroon 5 performed the song on the eighth season finale of The Voice. The band released their first greatest hits album Singles, on September 25, 2015, through 222 and Interscope. It contains 12 singles taken from the first five albums. In 2016, the band also released The Studio Albums, an album collection box set featuring all five albums was available on September 30, 2016. The same year, Sam Farrar who had been touring and collaborated with Maroon 5, appears in the band's promotional photo, where he became a new official member.

=== 2017–2018: Red Pill Blues ===
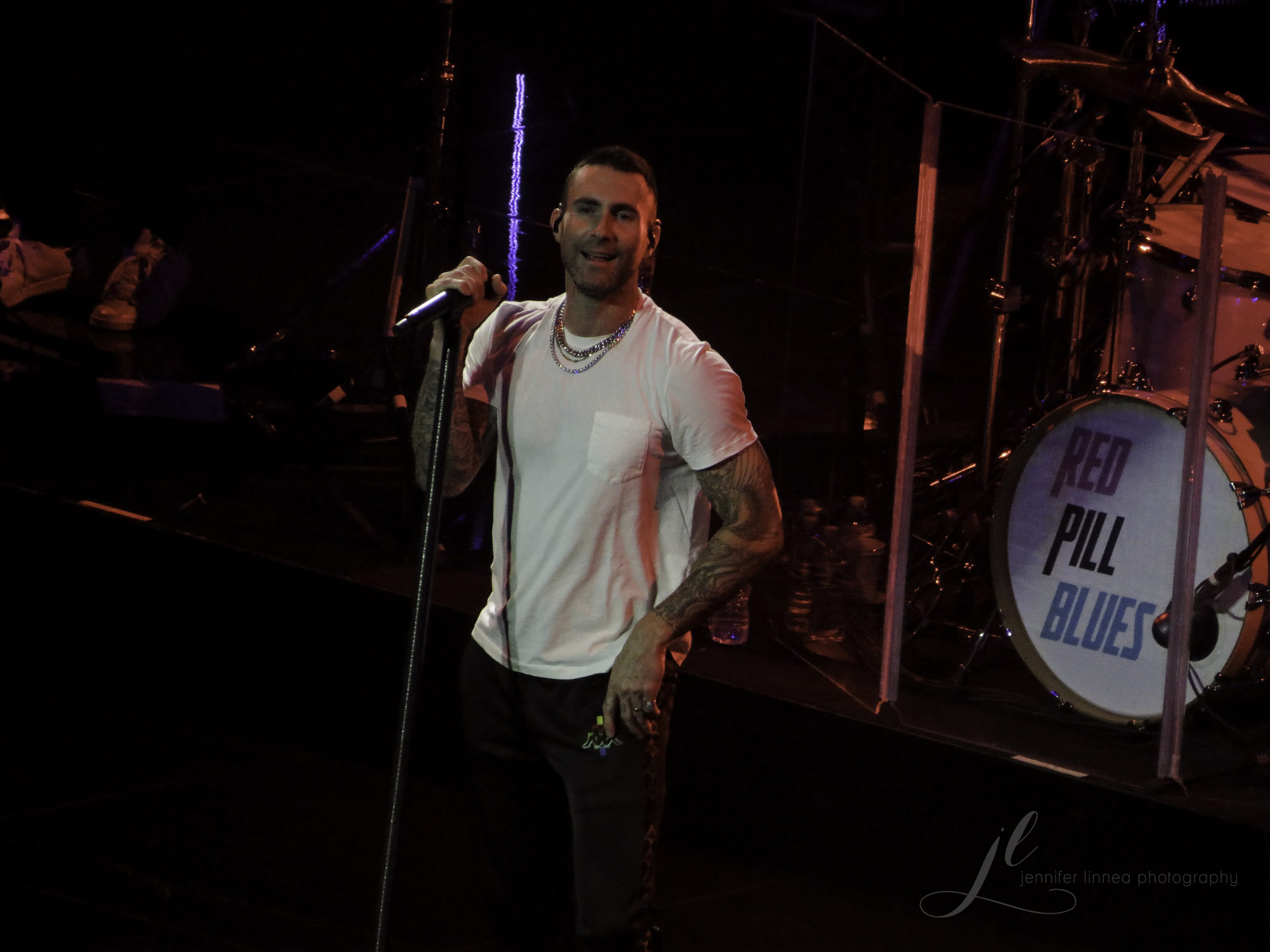
Maroon 5 performing at the Pepsi Center in Denver, Colorado in September 2018 during the Red Pill Blues Tour.

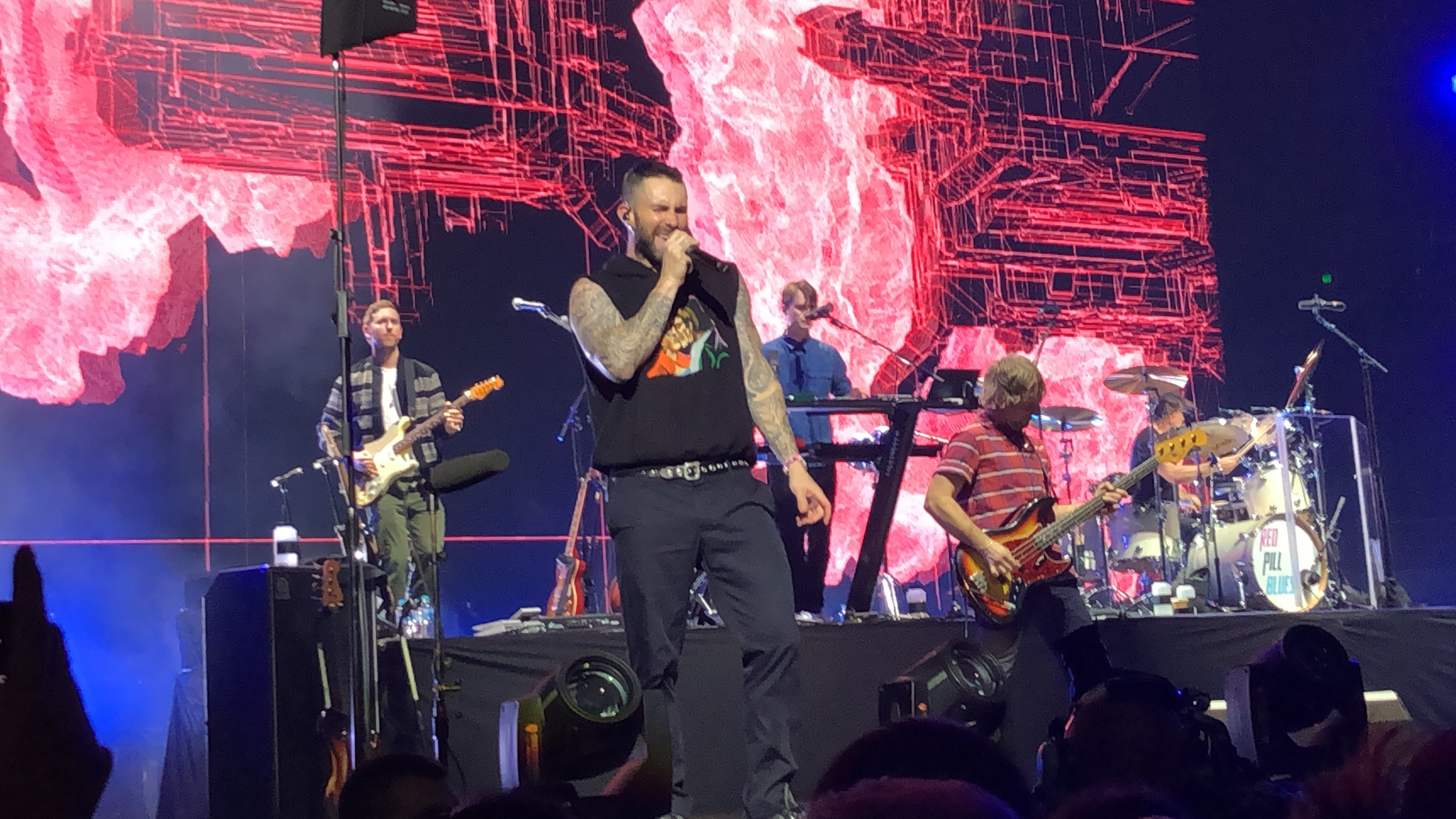
Maroon 5 performing in Sydney, Australia in February 2019

In January 2017, Adam Levine revealed that the band was working on their sixth studio album. According to Levine, the album would be R&B-influenced. At the 2017 Teen Choice Awards on August 13, where the band received the Decade Award, Levine announced that the album would be released in November. In October 2017, Maroon 5 revealed their sixth studio album Red Pill Blues, the name inspired by the 1999 science fiction film The Matrix. The album was released on November 3, 2017, and peaked at number two on the Billboard 200.

This album includes four singles: "Don't Wanna Know", "Cold", "What Lovers Do" and "Wait". The re-release of the album to include a remix version of "Girls Like You" featuring Cardi B, which was released in May 2018 and served as the fifth and final single. It peaked at number one at the Billboard Hot 100 spending seven weeks, which became their fourth number one on the chart. It spent 33 weeks in the top 10, tying both with Ed Sheeran's "Shape of You" and Post Malone and Swae Lee's "Sunflower" for the longest top 10 run in the chart's archives at the time.

To support the album, Maroon 5 embarked on the Red Pill Blues Tour, began on May 30, 2018, and concluded on December 31, 2019, along with special guests Julia Michaels, Cxloe and Sigrid. In June 2018, the band collaborated with Hyundai, to record a cover version of Bob Marley and the Wailers' "Three Little Birds", was released as a promotional single on Apple Music and featured with three vehicles are appeared on the advertisements for Hyundai Santa Fe and Kona in the 2018 FIFA World Cup and Nexo in the song's official music video both were directed by Joseph Kahn. In August 2018, the group made a guest appearance in the first episode of the YouTube Premium television web series Sugar.

=== 2019–2022: Super Bowl LIII halftime show, Madden's leave of absence and Jordi ===
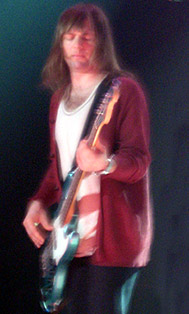
Original bassist Mickey Madden (pictured performing with the band in 2007) left the band in 2020 following domestic violence charges

On February 3, 2019, Maroon 5 headlined the Super Bowl LIII halftime show in Atlanta, Georgia, at Mercedes-Benz Stadium, with American rappers Big Boi and Travis Scott. The band's decision was controversial, because other musicians, including Cardi B and Rihanna, refused to perform. The musicians who pulled out did so to show their support for Colin Kaepernick and others who protested police brutality and racism by kneeling during the U.S. national anthem and faced repercussions by the NFL for doing so. (See also U.S. national anthem kneeling protests). The performance drew criticism from audiences and critics.

On September 20, 2019, Maroon 5 released the song "Memories", which peaked at number two on the Billboard Hot 100. The following month, guitarist James Valentine revealed the details about the band working on their new album, stating: "It does foreshadow a new album, which we're currently in the studio working on. But, yeah, we are working on a new record." In June 2020, it was announced that David Dobkin was directing a documentary film about the band. As of March 2026, no further announcements has been made.

On June 27, 2020, bassist Mickey Madden was arrested in Los Angeles due to an allegation of domestic violence. Madden took a leave of absence from Maroon 5 after his arrest. The Los Angeles District Attorney ultimately declined prosecution; the case was dropped, and no charges were filed. Madden was replaced by Sam Farrar, leaving Levine and Carmichael as the two remaining original members.

In July 2020, Maroon 5 announced the single "Nobody's Love", which was released on July 24. On December 16, 2020, Levine revealed their seventh studio album was set for release in 2021. They released their next single, "Beautiful Mistakes" featuring American rapper Megan Thee Stallion, on March 3, 2021. On April 29, 2021, the band announced their seventh studio album, Jordi, would be released on June 11, 2021. The singles "Memories", "Nobody's Love", and "Beautiful Mistakes" all appear on the album. It also received mixed reviews from critics.

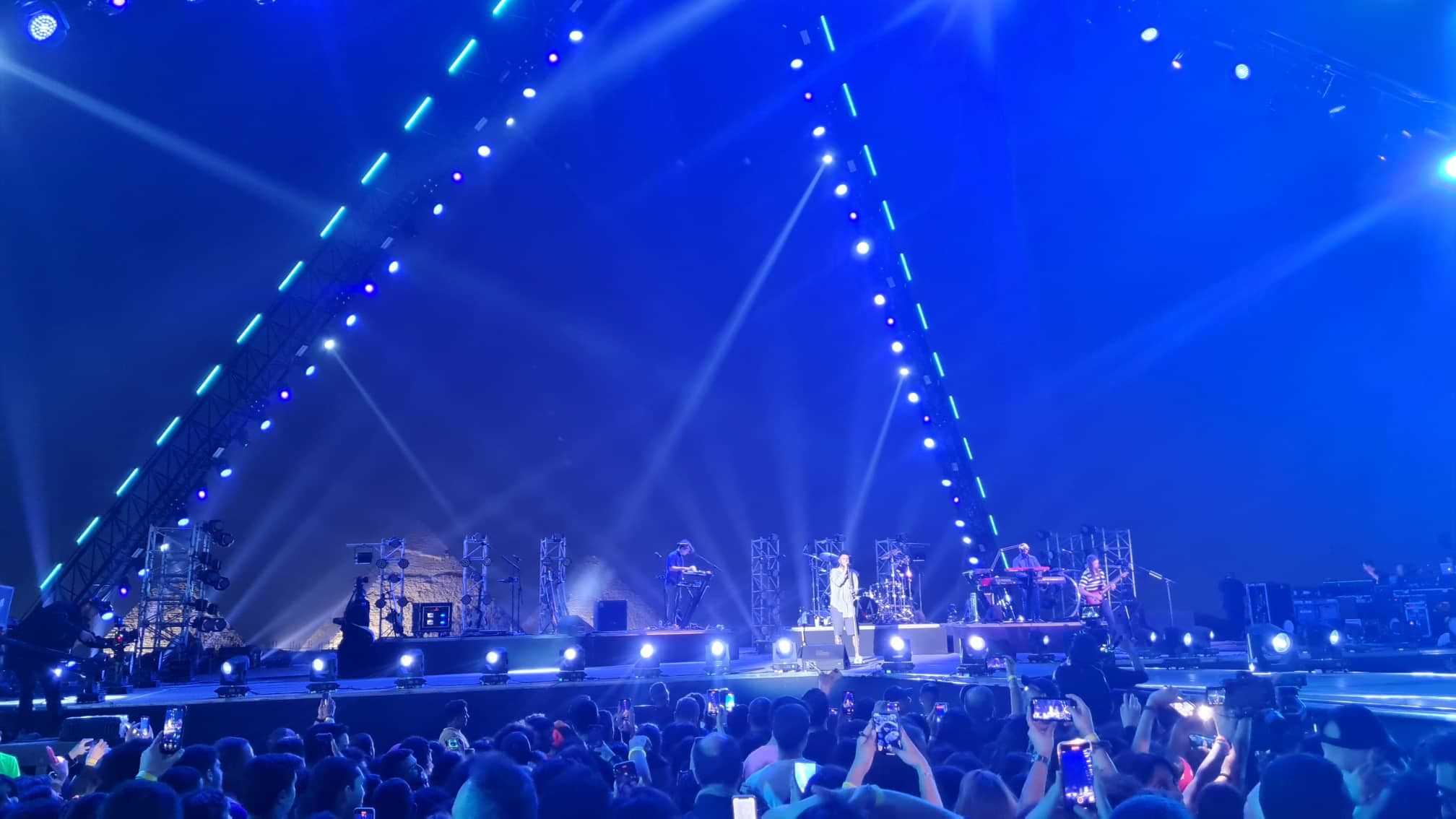
Maroon 5 performing live at the pyramids, Egypt 2022.

In September 2021, Maroon 5 headlined on a television tribute special titled Shine a Light: A Tribute to the Families of 9/11, aired on CNN to commemorate the 20th anniversary of the September 11, 2001 attacks in New York City. In May 2022, Maroon 5 conducted a concert at the pyramids of Giza in Cairo. There, PJ Morton stated that the band's performance in Egypt was better than their 2019 Super Bowl performance.

=== 2023–present: Las Vegas Residency and Love Is Like ===
In January 2023, it was announced that the band would perform at the first edition of The Town Festival in Brazil, on September 7, 2023. The band headlined their first Las Vegas residency titled, Maroon 5: The Las Vegas Residency at Dolby Live at the Park MGM. The show began on March 24, 2023, and ended on March 22, 2025, comprising 40 dates. On May 19, 2023, Maroon 5 released a new single titled "Middle Ground". The band headlined a nine-date 2024 summer tour in North America between June 21 and July 7, 2024, with Maren Morris as the tour's opening act. On April 10, 2024, Levine announced that the band are working on the next album. The following year, he confirmed that a new single would release "at the end of the month-ish," and that the album was slated to release around summer.

On April 25, 2025, Maroon 5 announced a new single titled "Priceless", featuring singer Lisa from Blackpink. The song and its music video were released on May 2, 2025. On June 23, 2025, Maroon 5 released the second single, "All Night". Along with the single, they also announced their eighth studio album Love Is Like, which was released on August 15, 2025, with the title track featuring rapper Lil Wayne on the same day. In April 2026, Maroon 5 released a series of previews for the single titled "Heroine", which was released on May 1, 2026. A remix version of "Heroine" by Room 9, was later released on June 11, 2026 in Italy.

== Musical style and influences ==
I think the classic Maroon 5 song is minor, and it has some funk, Nile Rodgers-style guitar and the lyrics are probably about getting your heart broken. So minor, funk and heartbreak -- that's the Maroon 5 formula.

— James Valentine

Maroon 5 has been described as pop, pop rock, funk rock, dance-pop, blue-eyed soul, neo soul, soft rock and pop-R&B, while their early work has been characterized as indie rock. Adam Levine has stated: "Everything that's written and performed and put together pretty much comes from us. I just think people would be surprised to know that we're a self-contained unit. We're a band that does their own thing. There's no puppet master." However, in an article about the songwriter and producer Benny Blanco, it is revealed that at least some of the band's songs, such as "Moves like Jagger", are the product of efforts by or collaborations with, professional songwriters and producers. In the same article, Levine says, "It's almost as if [Benny Blanco] has the Midas touch in putting the right people together at the right time to create a musical moment. He's about collaboration. And he's so good at nailing down who does everything best."

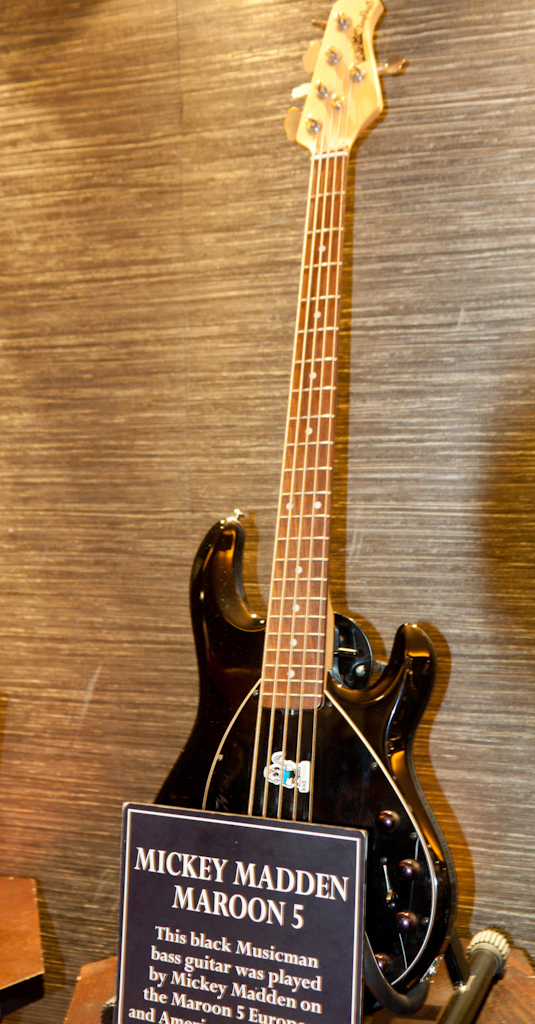
Madden's black Music Man bass guitar on display at the Hard Rock Cafe, London

In an interview with Variety in November 2018, the frontman of the band, Adam Levine, when asked if the band is pop, rock or urban, said, "Something unique to this band is that we have always looked to hip-hop, R&B, all rhythmic forms of music, from back when we were writing our first album to now. Rock music is nowhere, really. I don't know where it is. If it's around, no one's invited me to the party. All of the innovation and the incredible things happening in music are in hip-hop".

Adam Levine cited Britpop band Oasis as "one of the best bands ever" and said "We love Oasis". The band has cited Michael Jackson, the Beatles, The Police, Justin Timberlake, Stevie Wonder, the Bee Gees, Tonic, Prince, Tupac Shakur and Marvin Gaye as influences. Levine has also cited Billy Joel as an influence. Furthermore, guitarist James Valentine said he was influenced by guitarists like Pat Metheny, Bill Frisell and John Scofield, as well as the rock band Queens of the Stone Age. The band's songs tend to be very guitar-heavy, often accompanied by piano or synthesizer. The theme in most of their songs is love, frequently lost love; songs like "This Love", "Makes Me Wonder" and "Misery" have a very cynical tone, often expressing dissatisfaction with a relationship, while their more heartfelt and emotional songs such as "She Will Be Loved" and "Never Gonna Leave This Bed" express a longing for a romantic relationship. "Makes Me Wonder" has a secondary theme, in which Levine expresses his disillusionment and frustration with the state of American politics and the Iraq War.

The band's style changes from album to album. Songs About Jane consists of songs about Levine's ex-girlfriend Jane Herman. On It Won't Be Soon Before Long the songs are less personal and are more electric with more use of synthesizers, creating a retro feel. Hands All Over continues the band's lost love theme, along with songs about infatuation and was re-released in 2011, with the hit single "Moves like Jagger", an electropop song which represents a drastic change in the band's sound, with more of a dance feel to it. "It was one of those songs that was definitely a risk", Levine said. "It's a bold statement. We've never really released a song like that. But it's exciting to do something different, do something new. I'm just glad that everyone likes it." James Valentine called Overexposed "our most 'pop' record ever and we weren't shy about really going for it". They have also experimented with new wave and disco on several albums.

== Band members ==
Current

- Adam Levine – lead vocals, rhythm and lead guitar (1994–present)
- Jesse Carmichael – rhythm and lead guitar, backing vocals (1994–2012, 2014–present), keyboards (1998–2012, 2014; hiatus 2012–2014)
- James Valentine – lead and rhythm guitar (2001–present), backing vocals (2006–present)
- Matt Flynn – drums, percussion (2006–present); hiatus for a few shows in 2009 and in 2025; touring member (2004–2006)
- PJ Morton – keyboards, backing vocals (2012–present); touring member (2010–2012)
- Sam Farrar – bass, samples, percussion, keyboards, programming, rhythm guitar, backing vocals (2016–present); touring member (2001, 2012–2016)

Touring

- Jacob Scesney – saxophone, percussion (2025)
- Nate Morton – drums, percussion (2025); filled in for Matt Flynn for the first few shows of the band's Love Is Like Tour in October 2025.

Former

- Ryan Dusick – drums, percussion (1994–2006), backing vocals (1999–2006)
- Mickey Madden – bass (1994–2020)

== Discography ==
Studio albums

- The Fourth World (as Kara's Flowers, 1997)
- Songs About Jane (2002)
- It Won't Be Soon Before Long (2007)
- Hands All Over (2010)
- Overexposed (2012)
- V (2014)
- Red Pill Blues (2017)
- Jordi (2021)
- Love Is Like (2025)

== Awards and nominations ==
Maroon 5 have been the recipients of three Grammy Awards, three American Music Awards, and three People's Choice Awards, with five Teen Choice Awards, and six Billboard Music Awards. In 2004 World Music Awards, it won the award for "World's Best New Group". In August 2018, the band was ranked 37th and 11th on Billboard's Hot 100 60th Anniversary Greatest of All Time and on Billboard's "The Top 60 Duos/Groups of All Time" respectively. In January 2020, the band was listed number nine on the Billboard Top Artists of the 2010s chart.

Hands All Over, the band's third studio album, which was released in September 2010, peaked at number two on the Billboard 200 charts. In 2011, the album was re-released and supported by the single "Moves like Jagger", a song featuring American singer Christina Aguilera. The song became the band's second single to reach number one on the Hot 100 chart; it has sold over 14.4 million copies worldwide, making it one of the best-selling singles worldwide. The band released their fourth studio album, Overexposed, in June 2012. The album peaked at number two on the Billboard 200 chart. The first two singles from the album "Payphone" and "One More Night", were both international hits and peaked at two and one on the Hot 100 chart respectively. "One More Night", managed to beat Psy's "Gangnam Style" by reaching number one on Billboard Hot 100 and stayed tied with Carly Rae Jepsen's hit single "Call Me Maybe" for most weeks at No. 1 in 2012.

Maroon 5 ranked 15 on Recording Industry Association of America's (RIAA) "Top Artists – Digital Singles" list, with certified sales of 15 million in the United States. In 2013, Maroon 5 became the third most-played artist on Top 40 Mainstream radio, based on Clear Channel owned Mediabase, becoming one of the most successful acts of Interscope Records. That same year, the band ranked as the 94th best artist of all time based on Top 100 Artists of All Time at Billboard Hot 100 55th Anniversary.On September 10, 2014, their fifth studio album, V, debuted at top of the weekly Billboard 200 chart with 164,000 copies sold within the first week.

== Tours ==
Headlining

- Songs About Jane Tour (2003–2005)
- 2005 Honda Civic Tour (2005)
- It Won't Be Soon Before Long Tour (2007–2008)
- Palm Trees & Power Lines Tour (2010)
- Hands All Over Tour (2011–2012)
- Overexposed Tour (2012–2014)
- Maroon V Tour (2015–2018)
- Red Pill Blues Tour (2018–2019)
- 2020 Tour (2020)
- MMXXI Tour (2021)
- World Tour 2022 (2022)
- UK + Europe 2023 (2023)
- 2024 North American Summer Tour (2024)
- Asia Tour 2025 (2025)
- Love Is Like Tour (2025–present)

Co-headlining

- 2008 Summer Tour (2008) (with Counting Crows)
- 2011 Summer Tour (2011) (with Train)
- 2013 Honda Civic Tour (2013) (with Kelly Clarkson)

Promotional

- The Club Tour (2007)
- Back to School Tour (2009)

Residency

- Maroon 5: The Las Vegas Residency (2023–2025)

Opening act

- Jeep World Outside Festival (2002) (with various artists)
- Any Time Now Tour (O.A.R.) (2002)
- More Than You Think You Are Tour
  (Matchbox Twenty) (2003)
- John Mayer and the Counting Crows Summer Tour (John Mayer and Counting Crows) (2003)
- Heavier Things Tour (John Mayer) (2004)
- The Baptism Tour (Lenny Kravitz) (2004)
- John Mayer 2004 Summer Tour (2004) (with John Mayer)
- A Bigger Bang Tour (The Rolling Stones) (2005)
- The Police Reunion Tour (The Police) (2007)
- iHeartRadio Jingle Ball Tour 2014 (2014) (with various artists)

== Philanthropy ==
- Since 2008, Maroon 5 has partnered with environmental non-profit REVERB to green their tours and engage fans to take action for the environment.
- Maroon 5 has been a longtime supporter of Aid Still Required (ASR). After contributing the live version of "She Will Be Loved" to ASR's All Star CD in support of the survivors of the 2004 Southeast Asian tsunami Maroon 5 went on to record a public service announcement for ASR about work that still needed to be done in Haiti. Maroon 5 has participated in various ASR social media campaigns and Levine has donated a meet and greet on the set of The Voice to raise funds for various ASR programs.
- Maroon 5 supports the Bonnie J. Addario Lung Cancer Foundation.
- In 2006, Maroon 5 were awarded an Environmental Media Award, due to donating their 2005 North American tour income to a global environment organization, called "Global Cool".
- In 2011, Maroon 5 (along with PJ Morton, who was the band's touring member at the time) took part in a project named "24 Hour Session" with Coca-Cola. The band wrote and recorded the song "Is Anybody Out There?" in 24 hours. After the project ended, the track was made available on the Coca-Cola website. It was also announced that if the song would be downloaded more than 100,000 times, Coca-Cola would donate to Africa for clean water. It won the award for Best Event at the 2011 BT Digital Music Awards.
- Following the earthquake and tsunami in Japan in March 2011, Maroon 5 donated proceeds from their concerts in Japan to Japanese Red Cross in May 2011.
- Adam Levine, whose brother is openly gay, is an outspoken supporter of same sex marriage and LGBT rights. In 2011, he made a video on Maroon 5's official YouTube account in support of the It Gets Better Project. In January 2012, he announced that Maroon 5 had changed the location of their post–Grammy Awards show because of the "unnamed Los Angeles restaurant's backing of Proposition 8".
- In August 2013, Maroon 5 teamup with the rum brand Malibu, to host a collaborative competition titled Marooned on Malibu Island, where encouraged fans participate to nominate their city by creating their own virtual Malibu Island. After the contest was closed, the event later took place in a concert at the Roseland Ballroom in Manhattan, New York, on November 16, 2013.
- In 2015, the band had a partnership with Vita Coco, as part for the North American leg of the Maroon V Tour, with every stop through on-site allowing fans to drink coconut water and meet-and-greet with the band.
- On June 25, 2016, Maroon 5 partnered with UNICEF to launch #Maroon5Day to mark the 14th anniversary of the release of their first album Songs About Jane. Fans were encouraged to donate to the U.S. Fund for UNICEF. It was announced that Maroon 5 will match up to $25,000 in donations to help children in need. The campaign was nominated at the 2016 Shorty Social Good Awards for Best Influencer & Celebrity Partnership.
- On March 25, 2017, Maroon 5 participated during the World Wide Fund for Nature (WWF) "Earth Hour" campaign.
- Maroon 5 partnered with Interscope Records and gave a donation for the charities are the Malala Fund in 2018, Big Brothers Big Sisters of America, with the NFL for the Super Bowl LIII halftime show in 2019, and the ACLU in 2020, respectively.
- In October 2020, Maroon 5 featured in the virtual music festival 'Save Our Stages Fest' presented by National Independent Venue Association in partnership with YouTube Music to support indie venues.

== Publications ==
- Maroon 5 – Midnight Miles: On the Road Through 5 Continents & 17 Countries, MTV Books (July 18, 2006)
- Chloë Govan – Maroon 5: Shooting for the Stars, Omnibus Press (October 14, 2013)
- Ryan Dusick – Harder to Breathe: A Memoir of Making Maroon 5, Losing It All, and Finding Recovery, BenBella Books (November 15, 2022)

== See also ==
- Maroon 5 videography
- List of artists featured on MTV Unplugged
- List of artists who reached number one on the Australian singles chart
- List of artists who reached number one in Ireland
- List of artists who reached number one on the UK Singles Chart
- List of artists who reached number one in the United States
- List of artists who reached number one on the U.S. Adult Contemporary chart
- List of artists who reached number one on the U.S. Dance Club Songs chart
- List of bands from Los Angeles
- List of blue-eyed soul artists
- List of dance-pop artists
- List of funk rock bands
