= Waterparks discography =

American pop rock band discography

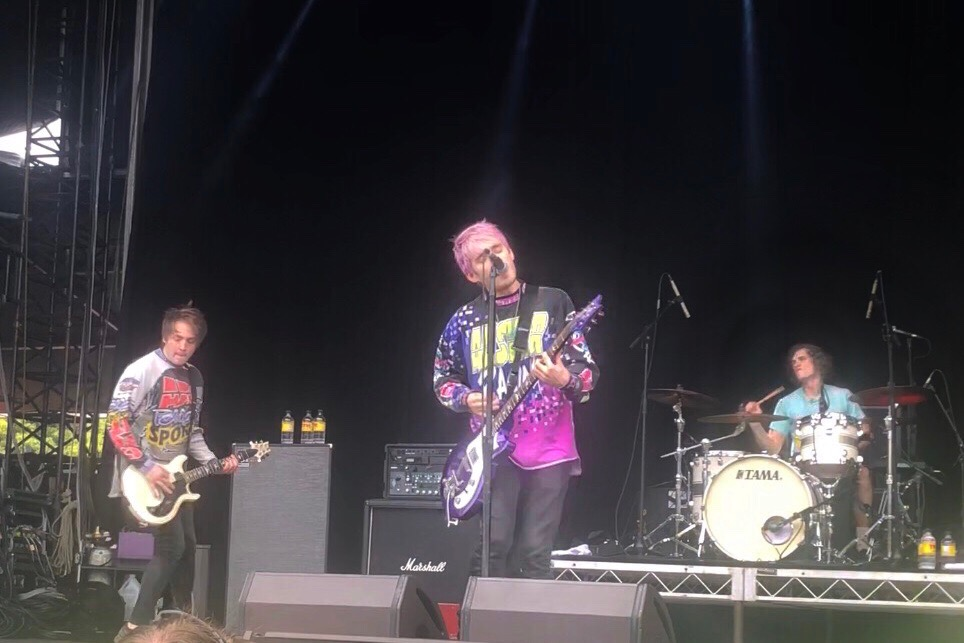
- Waterparks performing at Good Things Festival in 2018.
- Studio albums: 6
- EPs: 3
- Live albums: 1
- Singles: 47
- Music videos: 50
- Demo albums: 2

American pop rock band Waterparks has released six studio albums, three extended plays, one live album, two demo albums, 47 singles, and 50 music videos. The band has self-released two EPs, Airplane Conversations (2012) and Black Light (2014). The band's third EP, Cluster (2016) was released via Equal Vision. The band released their first studio album, Double Dare, later in 2016 via Equal Vision. Their second studio album Entertainment was released under the same label in 2018. On May 23, 2019, the band announced that they had left Equal Vision and signed on with Hopeless. Their third studio album, Fandom, was released in 2019. In 2020, the band signed with 300 Entertainment and their fourth studio album, Greatest Hits, was released in 2021. In 2022, the band signed with Fueled by Ramen and their fifth studio album, Intellectual Property, was released in April 2023.

== Albums ==
=== Studio albums ===
Title	Details	Peak chart positions							
Title	Details	US	US Rock	US Alt.	US Indie	US Heat	AUS	SCO	UK
Double Dare	Released: November 4, 2016; Label: Equal Vision; Format: CD, LP, download, streaming	—	50	—	33	10	—	—	—
Entertainment	Released: January 26, 2018; Label: Equal Vision; Format: CD, LP, download, streaming	98	13	7	5	—	—	62	85
Fandom	Released: October 11, 2019; Label: Hopeless; Format: CD, LP, download, streaming	32	5	2	2	—	—	43	52
Greatest Hits	Released: May 21, 2021; Label: 300; Format: CD, LP, download, streaming	42	6	5	—	—	—	12	37
Intellectual Property	Released: April 14, 2023; Label: Fueled by Ramen; Format: CD, LP, download, streaming	33	6	4	—	—	—	2	10
Jinx	Released: July 24, 2026; Label: BMG; Format: CD, LP, download, streaming	132	35	21	16	—	39	23	95
"—" denotes a recording that did not chart or was not released in that territory.

=== Live albums ===
Title	Album details	Peak positions
Title	Album details	US Cur.
Fandom: Live in the UK	Released: November 27, 2020; Label: Hopeless; Format: Streaming, CD, BD, download	66

=== Demo albums ===
Title	Album details
1 (A Collection of Unreleased Home Demos, This Is Not G, or Even an Album, Shut Up Enjoy)	Released: January 22, 2020; Label: Self-released; Format: Streaming
2 (A Collection of Unreleased Home Demos, This Is Not J, or Even an Album, Shut Up Enjoy)	Released: October 18, 2024; Label: Self-released; Format: Streaming

== Extended plays ==
Title	EP details	Peak chart positions
Title	EP details	US Heat
Airplane Conversations	Released: April 3, 2012; Label: Self-released; Format: CD, download	—
Black Light	Released: June 5, 2014; Label: Self-released; Format: CD, download	—
Cluster	Released: January 15, 2016; Label: Equal Vision; Format: CD, download	18

== Singles ==
List of singles, with selected chart positions
Title	Year	Peak chart positions	Album
Title	Year	US Alt Dig.	Album
"I Was Hiding Under Your Porch Because I Love You"	2011	—	Airplane Conversations
"Silver"	2011	—	Airplane Conversations
"Fantastic"	2011	—	Airplane Conversations
"New Wave"	2013	—	Black Light
"I'm a Natural Blue"	2013	—	Black Light
"Crave"	2015	—	Cluster
"Stupid for You"	2016	—	Double Dare
"Hawaii (Stay Awake)"	2016	—	Double Dare
"Royal"	2016	—	Double Dare
"Plum Island"	2017	—	Double Dare
"Gloom Boys"	2017	—	Double Dare
"21 Questions"	2017	—	Double Dare
"Blonde"	2017	—	Entertainment
"Lucky People"	2017	—	Entertainment
"Not Warriors"	2017	—	Entertainment
"We Need to Talk"	2018	—	Entertainment
"Peach (Lobotomy)"	2018	—	Entertainment
"Beating Heart Baby" (Head Automatica cover)	2019	—	Rock Sound: Worship and Tributes Volume II
"Turbulent"	2019	—	Fandom
"Watch What Happens Next"	2019	—	Fandom
"Dream Boy"	2019	—	Fandom
"[Reboot]"	2019	—	Fandom
"High Definition"	2019	—	Fandom
"Easy to Hate"	2019	—	Fandom
"Lowkey as Hell"	2020	—	Greatest Hits
"Snow Globe"	2021	—	Greatest Hits
"Numb"	2021	—	Greatest Hits
"You'd Be Paranoid Too (If Everyone Was Out to Get You)"	2021	—	Greatest Hits
"Just Kidding"	2021	—	Greatest Hits
"Violet!"	2021	—	Greatest Hits
"Funeral Grey"	2022	—	Intellectual Property
"Self-Sabotage"	2022	20	Intellectual Property
"Fuck About It" (featuring Blackbear)	2022	—	Intellectual Property
"Real Super Dark"	2023	—	Intellectual Property
"Brainwashed"	2023	—	Intellectual Property
"Sneaking Out of Heaven"	2023	—	Intellectual Property (Deluxe)
"Soulsucker"	2024	—	Non-album singles
"FAI2"	2024	—	Non-album singles
"Guilt (Interlude)"	2024	—	Non-album singles
"GH2024"	2024	—	Non-album singles
"Give Me a Break" (with Michael Clifford)	2025	—	Sidequest
"Red Guitar"	2025	—	Jinx
"If Lyrics Were Confidential"	2025	—	Jinx
"Any Minute Now"	2025	—	Jinx
"ICE"	2026	—	Non-album single
"Prowler"	2026	—	Jinx
"Better Than Therapy"	2026	—	Jinx
"—" denotes a recording that did not chart or was not released in that territory.

=== Other certified songs ===
Year	Title	Certifications	Album
2019	"I Miss Having Sex but at Least I Don’t Wanna Die Anymore"	RIAA: Gold	Fandom

== Music videos ==
Title	Year	Director(s)	Ref.
"I Was Hiding Under Your Porch Because I Love You"	2012	Matt Bell	
"Silver"	2013	Matt Bell	
"New Wave"	2014	Unknown	
"I'm A Natural Blue"	2015	Jawn Rocha	
"Crave"	2015	Jacob Stark	
"No Capes"	2016	Jawn Rocha	
"Stupid For You"	2016	Ernie Gilbert	
"Royal"	2017	Millicent Hailes	
"Plum Island"	2017	Tom Pullen	
"Gloom Boys"	2017	Unknown	
"21 Questions"	2017	Unknown	
"Blonde"	2017	Elijah Alvarado	
"Lucky People"	2017	Jawn Rocha	
"Not Warriors/Crybaby"	2018	Erik Rojas & Joe Mischo	
"We Need To Talk"	2018	Erik Rojas	
"Peach (Lobotomy)"	2018	Jawn Rocha	
"Watch What Happens Next"	2019	Awsten Knight	
"Dream Boy"	2019	Awsten Knight	
"High Definition"	2019	Awsten Knight	
"Easy To Hate"	2019	Awsten Knight	
"Lowkey As Hell"	2020	Awsten Knight	
"Snow Globe"	2021	Unknown	
"Numb"	2021	Unknown	
"You’d Be Paranoid Too (If Everyone Was Out To Get You)"	2021	Erik Rojas & Awsten Knight	
"Just Kidding"	2021	Jawn Rocha & Awsten Knight	
"Violet!"	2021	Awsten Knight & Erik Rojas	
"Fruit Roll Ups"	2021	Jawn Rocha & Awsten Knight	
"The Secret Life of Me"	2021	Erik Rojas & Awsten Knight	
"Funeral Grey"	2022	Erik Rojas & Awsten Knight	
"Self-Sabotage"	2022	Erik Rojas, Jawn Rocha, & Awsten Knight	
"Fuck About It"	2022	Unknown	
"Sneaking Out of Heaven"	2023	Unknown	
"Soulsucker"	2024	Unknown	
"FAI2"	2024	Unknown	
"Guilt (Interlude)"	2024	Unknown	
"Red Guitar" (12AM Music Video)	2025	Unknown	
"Red Guitar"	2025	Awsten Knight	
"If Lyrics Were Confidential"	2025	Unknown	
"If Lyrics Were Confidential" (6AM Music Video)	2025	Lucas Hand & Awsten Knight	
"Red Guitar" (9AM Music Video)	2025	Lucas Hand & Awsten Knight	
"Any Minute Now" (12PM Music Video)	2025	Unknown	
"If Lyrics Were Confidential" (6PM Music Video)	2026	Unknown	
"Red Guitar" (7PM Music Video)	2026	Unknown	
"If Lyrics Were Confidential" (11PM Music Video)	2026	Lucas Hand	
"Any Minute Now" (5AM Music Video)	2026	Lucas Hand	
"Any Minute Now" (1AM Music Video)	2026	Lucas Hand	
"Any Minute Now" (11AM Music Video)	2026	Lucas Hand	
"If Lyrics Were Confidential" (5PM Music Video)	2026	Lucas Hand	
"Any Minute Now" (1PM Music Video)	2026	Lucas Hand	
"Prowler"	2026	Lucas Hand & Awsten Knight	
