= After Party Tour =

2013 concert tour by Aaron Carter

- Tour by Aaron Carter
- Promotional poster for tour
- Start date: February 22, 2013
- End date: December 12, 2013
- Legs: 5
- No. of shows: 166 in North America

Aaron Carter concert chronology
- Remix Tour (2005); After Party Tour (2013); Wonderful World Tour (2014)

The After Party Tour was the sixth headlining concert tour by American pop singer Aaron Carter.

== Background ==
The tour was announced on Carter's Facebook page on January 11, 2013. In his post, he stated, "I’m happy to announce that I will be going on my long overdue tour #TheAfterPartyTour! Stay tuned for more dates that will be added soon. Here we go"! This was Carter's first tour in nine years. Following numerous career downfalls, the singer felt he would not have the opportunity to tour again. After his stint on Dancing with the Stars, Carter performed several one-off concerts, including the Summer MixTape Festival in 2012. Before the tour commenced, the singer left his tenure performing as Matt on the off-Broadway play The Fantasticks.

The tour began in February 2013 at the Chance Theater in Poughkeepsie, New York. The tour name stems from Carter's best-selling album, Aaron's Party (Come Get It).

== Opening acts ==
- Nikki Flores (select dates)
- Petrel (select dates)
- Alexis Babini (select dates)
- Chrystian (select dates)
- Justin Levinson (select dates)
- Lineup Atlantic (select dates)
- The Move Alongs (select dates)
- The Real Hooks (select dates)
- The Drive (Poughkeepsie)
- The Dedication (Poughkeepsie)
- Sam DeRosa (Poughkeepsie—September 2013)
- This is the Now (Poughkeepsie—September 2013)
- What is This (Amherst)
- Verse (Amherst—September 2013)
- Jay Loftus (Syracuse)
- Big Dan's iPad Experience (Syracuse)
- Leo LeMay (Syracuse)
- Project Boy Machine (Syracuse)
- Marcus Meston (Pittsburgh)
- Hope Vista (Asbury Park)
- Nick Barilla (Pittsburgh)
- Corey Balsamo (Amityville)
- 6 Stories Told (Amityville—March 2013)
- Ali Kramer (Amityville—March 2013)
- Persona (Amityville—March 2013)
- Waterparks (Houston—May 2013)
- Lexxi Saal (Amityville—September 2013)
- Dangerous Me (Amityville—September 2013)
- Charlotte Sometimes (Asbury Park)
- Jenni Reid (Jacksonville—March 2013)
- Promise Me Scarlet (Akron)
- Spencer Saylor (Columbus)
- 7th Heaven (St. Charles)
- Chris Koon (Louisville, Joliet)
- Quiet Out Loud (Joliet)
- Ship Captain Crew (Joliet)
- Carson Allen (Denver—March 2013)
- Something Like Seduction (Tucson)
- Cat Call (Tucson)
- Bangarang (Tucson)
- Kenny Holland (Scottsdale)
- Brandon Burrill (Ramona)
- Joel Simson (West Hollywood)
- Savannah Phillips (West Hollywood)
- Fredrick Daniel (West Hollywood)
- Charlotte Bash (West Hollywood)
- Danielle Taylor (Agoura Hills)
- Truth Under Attack (Seattle)
- Dylan Jakobsen (Seattle)
- Matt Bacnis (Seattle)
- The Ninth Step (Seattle)
- Legends of the Fall (Stanhope)
- Emily Kern (Stanhope)
- Rachel Miller (Stanhope)
- Joy Ride (Stanhope)
- Just Sayin (Stanhope)
- Two Step With Marlon Brando (Stanhope)
- Opus 99 (Richmond—April 2013)
- Chris Scholar (Richmond—April 2013)
- Kyle Thornton (Richmond—April 2013)
- A Collegiate Affair (Richmond—April 2013)
- Astro Safari (Saratoga)
- Ryan Cabrera (DeKalb)
- Tyler Hilton (DeKalb)
- Teddy Geiger (DeKalb)
- Erin Ivey (Austin)
- Shelby Blondell (Baltimore)
- Surviving Allsion (Tupelo)
- GLOtron (Tupelo)
- Automatic Love Gun (Tupelo)
- AyyO (Fargo)
- Triz (Fargo)
- Vince Tomas (select dates)
- Adam Mardel (select dates)
- Jaci'e (Canton, Dayton)
- JLarant (Canton, Dayton)
- Kid Riz (Teaneck)
- Like Violet (Teaneck)
- Dirty Pop (Auburn)
- THEYCALLMEPIANO (Silver Spring)

== Setlist ==
1. "Another Earthquake"
2. "America A O"
3. "When It Comes to You"
4. "Bounce" / "I Would" / "Iko Iko" / "To All the Girls"
5. "I'm All About You"
6. "Leave It Up to Me"
7. "That's Life"
8. "Do You Remember"
9. "City Lights"
10. "My First Ride"
11. "That's How I Beat Shaq"
12. "I Want Candy"
13. "Cowgirl (Lil' Mama)"
14. "Aaron's Party (Come Get It)"

== Tour dates ==
Date	City	Country	Venue
North America
February 22, 2013	Poughkeepsie	United States	Chance Theater
February 23, 2013	Amherst	United States	The Forvm
February 24, 2013	Syracuse	United States	Westcott Theater
February 26, 2013	Pittsburgh	United States	Hard Rock Cafe
February 27, 2013	New Haven	United States	Toad's Place
February 28, 2013	Pawtucket	United States	Met Café
March 1, 2013	Standish	United States	Memory Lane Music Hall
March 2, 2013	Londonderry	United States	Tupelo Music Hall
March 3, 2013	New York City	United States	Gramercy Theatre
March 5, 2013	Northampton	United States	Iron Horse Music Hall
March 6, 2013	Amityville	United States	Revolution Bar & Music Hall
March 7, 2013	Asbury Park	United States	The Stone Pony
March 8, 2013	West Chester	United States	The Note
March 9, 2013	Annapolis	United States	Rams Head On Stage
March 10, 2013	Vienna	United States	Jammin' Java
March 12, 2013	Nashville	United States	3rd & Lindsley
March 13, 2013	Decatur	United States	Eddie's Attic
March 14, 2013	Jacksonville	United States	Jack Rabbit's
March 17, 2013	Williamsburg	United States	Sadler Center
March 19, 2013	Akron	United States	Musica
March 20, 2013	Columbus	United States	Skully's Music Diner
March 21, 2013	Ferndale	United States	The Magic Bag
March 22, 2013	St. Charles	United States	River Rock House
March 23, 2013	Louisville	United States	Phoenix Hill Tavern
March 24, 2013	Joliet	United States	Mojoe's
March 26, 2013	Little Rock	United States	Juanita's Café and Bar
March 27, 2013	Lenexa	United States	Danny's Bar and Grill
March 28, 2013	Lincoln	United States	Knickerbockers
March 29, 2013	Denver	United States	Oriental Theater
March 30, 2013	Fort Collins	United States	Aggie Theatre
April 2, 2013	Tucson	United States	The Rock
April 3, 2013	Las Vegas	United States	Hard Rock Cafe on The Strip
April 4, 2013	Scottsdale	United States	Martini Ranch
April 5, 2013	Ramona	United States	Romona Mainstage
April 6, 2013	West Hollywood	United States	The Troubadour
April 7, 2013	Agoura Hills	United States	The Canyon Club
April 10, 2013	Seattle	United States	El Corazón
April 11, 2013	Portland	United States	McMenamins Mission Theater
April 12, 2013	Chico	United States	El Rey Theatrer
April 13, 2013	Reno	United States	Cargo
April 14, 2013	San Francisco	United States	Café Du Nord
April 15, 2013	San Luis Obispo	United States	SLO Brewing Company
April 18, 2013	Stanhope	United States	Stanhope House
April 19, 2013	Longmeadow	United States	Mills Theatre
April 20, 2013	Richmond	United States	Kingdom
April 21, 2013	Raleigh	United States	Lincoln Theatre
April 22, 2013	Roanoke	United States	Martin's Downtown Bar & Grill
April 23, 2013	Virginia Beach	United States	Shaka's
April 24, 2013	State College	United States	Café 210 West
April 25, 2013	Oneonta	United States	Oneonta Theatre
April 26, 2013	Hartford	United States	Great Hall in Union Station
April 27, 2013	Saratoga Springs	United States	Putnam Den
April 28, 2013	Boston	United States	The Cavern Club at the Hard Rock Café
April 30, 2013	Toledo	United States	Rocket Bar
May 2, 2013	St. Louis	United States	Old Rock House
May 3, 2013	DeKalb	United States	Egyptian Theatre
May 4, 2013	Steger	United States	Another Hole in the Wall
May 6, 2013	Columbia	United States	The Blue Note
May 9, 2013	Tulsa	United States	The Vanguard
May 10, 2013	Lewisville	United States	Hat Tricks
May 11, 2013	Houston	United States	The Concert Pub North
May 12, 2013	Helotes	United States	Josabi's Theatre
May 13, 2013	Austin	United States	The Belmont
May 15, 2013	Pensacola	United States	Vinyl Music Hall
May 16, 2013	Tampa	United States	The Ritz Ybor
May 17, 2013	Orlando	United States	The Social
May 18, 2013	Miami	United States	Stage 305 at Magic City Casino
May 28, 2013	Amagansett	United States	The Stephen Talkhouse
May 29, 2013	New Hope	United States	Havana
May 31, 2013	Reading	United States	Reverb
June 1, 2013	Luzerne	United States	Brews Brothers West
June 2, 2013	Baltimore	United States	Sound Stage
June 5, 2013	Greensboro	United States	Greene Street Club
June 6, 2013	Charlotte	United States	Amos' Southend Music Hall
June 7, 2013	Charleston	United States	Music Farm
June 9, 2013	Birmingham	United States	WorkPlay Theatre
June 10, 2013	Tupelo	United States	Goodtime Charlie's
June 13, 2013	Fargo	United States	Legacy Ballroom
June 14, 2013	Sioux Falls	United States	The Vault Nightclub
June 16, 2013	Minneapolis	United States	The Cabooze
June 18, 2013	Davenport	United States	Redstone Room
June 20, 2013	Canton	United States	The Auricle
June 21, 2013	Dayton	United States	McGuffy's House of Rock
June 26, 2013	Allentown	United States	Maingate Nightclub
June 27, 2013	Fairfield	United States	StageOne
June 28, 2013	Salisbury	United States	Blue Ocean Music Hall
June 29, 2013	Portland	United States	The Asylum
June 30, 2013	Norfolk	United States	Infinity Hall
July 4, 2013	Riverhead	United States	Suffolk Theater
July 7, 2013	Oak Bluffs	United States	Dreamland
August 3, 2013^{[A]}	Modesto	United States	Downtown Modesto
August 10, 2013^{[B]}	Chicago	United States	North Stage
August 23, 2013	Tampa	United States	Hard Rock Cafe
August 24, 2013	Kansas City	United States	Rockhurst University Community Center
August 31, 2013^{[C]}	Dallas	United States	The Boulevard
September 6, 2013	Worcester	United States	Tammany Hall
September 7, 2013	Derry	United States	Stockbridge Theatre
September 8, 2013	Amityville	United States	Ollie's Point
September 9, 2013	Butler	United States	Architekt Music
September 10, 2013	Teaneck	United States	Mexicali Live
September 11, 2013	Stage College	United States	Levels Nightclub
September 12, 2013	Albany	United States	Bayou Cafe
September 13, 2013	Amherst	United States	The Forvm
September 14, 2013	Poughkeepsie	United States	Chance Theater
September 17, 2013	Ottawa	Canada	Zaphod Beeblebrox
September 18, 2013	Montreal	Canada	Petit Campus
September 19, 2013	Burlington	United States	Higher Ground
September 20, 2013	Rochester	United States	Water Street Music Hall
September 21, 2013	Ithaca	United States	The Haunt
September 22, 2013	Toronto	Canada	Lee's Palace
September 23, 2013	Kingston	Canada	The Mansion
September 24, 2013	South Bend	United States	Club Fever
September 25, 2013	Lansing	United States	The Loft
September 26, 2013	Grand Rapids	United States	The Intersection
September 27, 2013	Newport	United States	Southgate House Revival
September 28, 2013	Louisville	United States	Headliners Music Hall
September 29, 2013	Knoxville	United States	NV Nightclub
October 1, 2013	Madison	United States	Majestic Theatre
October 2, 2013	Milwaukee	United States	Miramar Theater
October 3, 2013	Des Moines	United States	Wooly's
October 4, 2013	Ames	United States	The Maintenance Shop
October 5, 2013	Urbana	United States	Canopy Club
October 6, 2013	Iowa City	United States	Blue Moose Tap House
October 7, 2013	Bloomington	United States	Castle Theatre
October 8, 2013	Bloomington	United States	Buskirk-Chumley Theater
October 9, 2013	Auburn	United States	Bourbon Street Bar
October 10, 2013	Athens	United States	The Melting Point
October 11, 2013	Mobile	United States	Soul Kitchen Music Hall
October 12, 2013	Tallahassee	United States	Club Rehab
October 13, 2013	Gainesville	United States	High Dive
October 14, 2013	Jacksonville	United States	Jack Rabbit's
October 15, 2013	Atlanta	United States	Buckhead Theatre
October 16, 2013	Carrboro	United States	Cat's Cradle
October 17, 2013	Winston-Salem	United States	Ziggy's
October 18, 2013	Charlottesville	United States	Cat's Cradle
October 19, 2013	Richmond	United States	Kingdom
October 20, 2013	Silver Spring	United States	The Fillmore Silver Spring
October 21, 2013	Northampton	United States	Pearl Street Nightclub
October 22, 2013	Pawtucket	United States	Met Café
October 24, 2013	Bowling Green	United States	Howard's Club H
October 26, 2013	Hot Springs	United States	Jim's Razerback Pizza Patio
October 27, 2013	Memphis	United States	Minglewood Music Hall
October 28, 2013	Fayetteville	United States	George's Majestic Lounge
October 29, 2013	Lawrence	United States	The Bottleneck
October 30, 2013	Texarkana	United States	Shooter's Sports Bar
October 31, 2013	Little Rock	United States	Juanita's Café and Bar
November 1, 2013	Wichita	United States	Cotillion Ballroom
November 2, 2013	Dallas	United States	House of Blues
November 5, 2013	Boulder	United States	Fox Theatre
November 7, 2013	Denver	United States	Bluebird Theater
November 8, 2013	Fort Collins	United States	Aggie Theatre
November 9, 2013	Salt Lake City	United States	In The Venue
November 12, 2013	Sacramento	United States	Assembly
November 13, 2013	Santa Cruz	United States	The Catalyst
November 17, 2013	San Miguel	United States	The Ranch
November 19, 2013	Corvallis	United States	SubZero Nightclub
November 20, 2013	Portland	United States	Alhambra Theatre
November 21, 2013	Eugene	United States	W.O.W. Hall
November 22, 2013	Seattle	United States	El Corazón
November 23, 2013	Spokane	United States	Knitting Factory
November 24, 2013	Vancouver	Canada	Fortune Sound Club
December 6, 2013	Phoenix	United States	Crescent Ballroom
December 7, 2013	Tucson	United States	The Rock
December 8, 2013	Albuquerque	United States	Launchpad
December 10, 2013	El Paso	United States	Tricky Falls
December 12, 2013	Abilene	United States	Lucky Mule Saloon

Festivals and other miscellaneous performances
^{A} This concert was a part of "X-Fest"
^{B} This concert was a part of the "Northalsted Market Days"
^{C} This concert is a part of the "Block Party on The Boulevard"

=== Box office score data ===
Venue	City	Tickets sold / Available	Gross revenue
The Stone Pony	Asbury Park	418 / 850 (49%)	$11,387
Petit Campus	Montreal	300 / 300 (100%)	$5,316
Knitting Factory	Spokane	332 / 900 (37%)	$4,451

== Critical response ==
The tour received noted praise from many music critics. Allie Caren (The Daily Orange) writes the crowd was beyond excited to see Carter perform at his concert in Syracuse. She continues, "The overall tone of Carter's performance would have made all 90s kids in the audience reminiscent of the first Backstreet Boys or N Sync concert they ever attended. There is something about a pop star singing a feel-good pop song and dancing coordinated, pop-style moves—with back-up dancers—that brings a smile to an audience member's face".

In Northampton, Jake Reed (The Daily Collegian) estimates a successful comeback for Carter. He says, "Overall, the night was a success, because unlike other former child sensations, Carter didn’t spend the entire night removing himself from the image that he will always be known for. While odes to modern rap hits showed a new side of the 25-year-old's personality, it was respectable that he didn’t shy away from singing and dancing like he was 12 years old again". At the concert in Annapolis, Daneille Stern and Natasha Peavy (The Johns Hopkins News-Letter) called the energy of Carter's stage performance electric. They go on to say, "Throughout the concert, Carter was enthusiastic about engaging with the crowd, even going so far as to kiss a few select girls on the cheek and bring those with the best Carter-centric posters on stage for an Instagram photo-op".

== Personnel ==
- Music: DJ D-Nyce
- Dancers: Trey Rich and Nikko Rich
- Choreographer: Geo Hubela
