= Mardel =

Mardel may refer to:

== Places ==
- Mar del Plata, a city in Buenos Aires Province, Argentina

== People ==
- Adam Mardel (born 1989), American pop singer
- Carlos Mardel (c. 1695–1763), Hungarian-Portuguese military officer, engineer, and architect
- Guy Mardel (born 1944), French singer

== See also ==
- Mardell
