= Sidequest (disambiguation) =

A sidequest is a quest in a video game that deviates from the main plot.

Sidequest or Side Quest may also refer to:

- Sidequest, a scrapped 2025 studio album by Logic
- Sidequest (Michael Clifford album), 2025
- SideQuest Studios, a German video game company that developed Söldner-X: Himmelsstürmer
- Side Quest (TV series), an American anthology television miniseries by Ashly Burch
