= Songs About Jane Tour =

2003–2005 concert tour by Maroon 5

- Tour by Maroon 5
- Promotional poster for the tour
- Associated album: Songs About Jane
- Start date: September 15, 2003
- End date: August 24, 2005
- Legs: 18
- No. of shows: 180

Maroon 5 concert chronology
- Songs About Jane Tour
  (2003–2005)
- 2005 Honda Civic Tour
  (2005)
2005 Honda Civic Tour (2005)	Songs About Jane Tour (2003–2005)	It Won't Be Soon Before Long Tour (2007–2008)

The Songs About Jane Tour is the debut concert tour by American band Maroon 5. Kicking off in the fall of 2003, the tour promote their debut album, Songs About Jane (2002). Visiting Europe, the Americas, Asia and Australia, the band played 180 shows over the course of 15 months. Before starting the tour and in-between legs of the tour, the band served as the opening act for artists and groups are: Dave Matthews, Michelle Branch, Vanessa Carlton, Graham Colton Band, O.A.R., Jason Mraz, Matchbox Twenty, John Mayer, Nikka Costa, Counting Crows, Lenny Kravitz and Sheryl Crow; alongside playing radio, college and music festivals.

== Opening acts ==
- Gavin DeGraw (North America, Leg 1)
- Sara Bareilles (North America (Leg 1), Europe (Leg 4), select dates)
- Ingram Hill (North America, Leg 1)
- Marc Broussard (North America, Leg 1, select dates)
- Michael Tolcher (North America, Leg 1, select dates)
- Big City Rock (North America, Leg 1, select dates)
- Jason Mraz (Beaumont Club)
- Maxeen (Europe, Leg 3, select dates)
- Kane (United Kingdom, March 2004)
- Guster (United Kingdom, October 2004)
- Melbourne (Athens)
- Matt Lewis Band (Orem)
- Johnathan Rice (Europe (Leg 12), select dates)
- The Like (Europe (Leg 12), select dates)
- Thirsty Merc (Australia (Leg 13), select dates)
- Phantom Planet (Paso Robles)

== Setlist ==
The following setlist was obtained from the concert held on March 23, 2004, at Logo in Hamburg, Germany. It does not represent all concerts for the duration of the tour.

1. "Not Coming Home"
2. "The Sun"
3. "This Love"
4. "Tangled"
5. "Woman"
6. "Must Get Out"
7. "Harder to Breathe"
8. "Wasted Years"
9. "Sunday Morning"
10. "Shiver"

Encore

11. "She Will Be Loved"
12. "Sweetest Goodbye"

== Shows ==
Date	City	Country	Venue
2003
Europe
September 15	Stockholm	Sweden	Debaser
September 16	Amsterdam	Netherlands	Paradiso
September 18	London	England	Lock 17
September 19	Manchester	England	Manchester Academy 3
North America
September 21^{[A]}	San Francisco	United States	Sharon Meadow
September 24	Modesto	United States	Fat Cat Music House & Lounge
September 25^{[B]}	San Diego	United States	Cane's Bar & Grill
September 26	Chico	United States	Bell Memorial Union Auditorium
September 27^{[B]}	West Hollywood	United States	House of Blues
September 28^{[B]}	West Hollywood	United States	House of Blues
September 29^{[B]}	West Hollywood	United States	House of Blues
September 30	Tempe	United States	Nita's Hideaway
October 1	Albuquerque	United States	Sunshine Theater
October 2	Greeley	United States	Butler–Hancock Hall
October 4^{[B]}	Dallas	United States	Gypsy Tea Room
October 5	Austin	United States	Stubb's BBQ
October 6	Houston	United States	Ground Hall
October 7^{[B]}	New Orleans	United States	House of Blues
October 9	Little Rock	United States	Juanita's
October 10	Memphis	United States	The New Daisy Theatre
October 11	Nashville	United States	Exit/In
October 12	Birmingham	United States	WorkPlay Theatre
October 13	Birmingham	United States	WorkPlay Theatre
October 15^{[B]}	Atlanta	United States	Coca-Cola Roxy Theatre
October 16	Tampa	United States	Twilight
October 17^{[B]}	Lake Buena Vista	United States	House of Blues
October 18	Columbus	United States	Southern Theatre
October 19^{[B]}	North Myrtle Beach	United States	House of Blues
October 20	Charleston	United States	Music Farm
October 21	Knoxville	United States	Blue Cats
October 23	Lexington	United States	Singletary Center for the Arts
October 24	Washington, D.C.	United States	9:30 Club
October 25	Lewisburg	United States	Uptown Nightclub
October 26	Clifton Park	United States	Northern Lights
October 28	Orono	United States	Maine Center for the Arts
October 29	New York City	United States	Roseland Ballroom
October 30	Boston	United States	Paradise Rock Club
October 31^{[B]}	Philadelphia	United States	Theatre of Living Arts
November 1	Pittsburgh	United States	Club Laga
November 2	Toronto	Canada	The Opera House
November 3	Cleveland	United States	Odeon Concert Club
November 4	Detroit	United States	Saint Andrew's Hall
November 6^{[B]}	Chicago	United States	House of Blues
November 7	Indianapolis	United States	Knights of Columbus Building
November 8	Milwaukee	United States	Rave Hall
November 9	Saint Paul	United States	Schoenecker Arena
November 12	St. Louis	United States	The Pageant
November 13	Kansas City	United States	Beaumont Club
November 14	Tulsa	United States	Curly's
November 16	Colorado Springs	United States	32 Bleu
November 17^{[B]}	Denver	United States	Fillmore Auditorium
November 18	Salt Lake City	United States	Club DV8
November 20	Seattle	United States	Showbox Comedy and Supper Club
November 21	Vancouver	Canada	Richard's on Richards
November 22	Portland	United States	Roseland Theater
November 24	San Francisco	United States	The Fillmore
November 25	Anaheim	United States	House of Blues
November 26^{[B]}	Las Vegas	United States	House of Blues
December 8	Minneapolis	United States	Target Center
December 10	Indianapolis	United States	Murat Theatre
December 13	Buffalo	United States	HSBC Arena
December 17	Hartford	United States	Meadows Music Theatre
December 23	Camden	United States	Tweeter Center
2004
February 9	Calgary	Canada	The Whiskey
February 10	Edmonton	Canada	Iron Horse
February 13	Tacoma	United States	Puget Sound Memorial Fieldhouse
February 15	Pullman	United States	Beasley Performing Arts Coliseum
Europe
March 15	London	England	Mean Fiddler
March 16	Birmingham	England	Carling Academy 2
March 17	Glasgow	Scotland	The Garage
March 19	Dublin	Ireland	The Village
March 20	Manchester	England	Manchester Academy 2
March 22	Cologne	Germany	Prime Club
March 23	Hamburg	Germany	Logo
March 24	Frankfurt	Germany	Nachtleben
March 25	Munich	Germany	Atomic Café
March 26	Berlin	Germany	Magnet Club
March 28	Copenhagen	Denmark	Lille Vega
March 29	Stockholm	Sweden	Nalen
March 31	Amsterdam	Netherlands	Paradiso
April 2	London	England	Astoria
North America
April 3	New York City	United States	New Amsterdam Theatre
Australia
April 14	Melbourne	Australia	Mercury Lounge
April 15	Sydney	Australia	Gaelic Club
North America
April 21^{[C]}	Harrisonburg	United States	JMU Convocation Center
April 22^{[D]}	Bristol	United States	Campus Recreation Center
April 23	Easton	United States	Stonehill Sports Complex
April 24^{[E]}	Frostburg	United States	Cordts Main Arena
April 25	Hanover	United States	Leede Arena
April 27	York	United States	Wolf Gym
April 29	Hempstead	United States	Mack Sports Complex
May 2^{[F]}	Princeton	United States	Quadrangle Club
May 4	Urbana	United States	The Canopy Club
May 5	Florence	United States	Flowers Hall
May 6	Savannah	United States	Fine Arts Hall
May 7^{[G]}	Norfolk	United States	Town Point Park
May 8	Elon	United States	Alumni Gym
May 10	Durham	United States	Lundholm Gym
May 13	Santa Clara	United States	Leavey Center
May 14^{[H]}	Chula Vista	United States	Coors Amphitheatre
May 15^{[I]}	Pasadena	United States	Rose Bowl
May 16	Tucson	United States	Rialto Theatre
May 17	Las Vegas	United States	House of Blues
May 21^{[J]}	New York City	United States	Madison Square Garden
May 22^{[K]}	Mansfield	United States	Tweeter Center for the Performing Arts
South America
May 29	São Paulo	Brazil	DirecTV Music Hall
May 31	Rio de Janeiro	Brazil	Garden Hall
North America
June 23^{[L]}	Del Mar	United States	Harrah's Rincon Grandstand Stage
June 26^{[M]}	Bonner Springs	United States	Verizon Wireless Amphitheater
August 31	Orlando	United States	Hard Rock Live
September 1^{[N]}	Lancaster	United States	Antelope Valley Grandstand
September 2^{[O]}	Sacramento	United States	Golden 1 Stage
September 12	Las Vegas	United States	Rain in the Desert
Europe
September 16^{[P]}	Rastatt	Germany	DaimlerChrysler Werk
North America
September 18^{[Q]}	Boston	United States	FleetCenter
September 19	Durham	United States	Whittemore Center
September 22^{[R]}	Puyallup	United States	Puyallup Fair Grandstand
Asia
September 29	Tokyo	Japan	Shibuya Public Hall
September 30	Nagoya	Japan	Club Quattro
October 1	Osaka	Japan	Big Cat
Europe
October 5	Nottingham	England	Rock City
October 6	Leeds	England	University Refectory
October 8	Glasgow	Scotland	Clyde Auditorium
October 9	Birmingham	England	Carling Academy
October 10	Dublin	Ireland	Olympia Theatre
October 12	Manchester	England	Carling Apollo Manchester
October 14	London	England	Shepherd's Bush Empire
October 15	London	England	Shepherd's Bush Empire
October 16	London	England	Shepherd's Bush Empire
October 18	Copenhagen	Denmark	Valby-Hallen
October 19	Stockholm	Sweden	Cirkus
October 20	Hamburg	Germany	CCH Saal 3
October 21	Berlin	Germany	Columbiahalle
October 23	Tilburg	Netherlands	013
October 24	Zürich	Switzerland	X-tra
October 25	Munich	Germany	Tonhalle
October 26	Vienna	Austria	Bank Austria Halle
October 28	Milan	Italy	Discoteca Alcatraz
October 29	Paris	France	La Cigale
October 30	Amsterdam	Netherlands	Heineken Music Hall
October 31	Amsterdam	Netherlands	Heineken Music Hall
November 1	Cologne	Germany	E-Werk
November 3	Dublin	Ireland	Ambassador Theatre
November 4	Manchester	England	Carling Apollo Manchester
November 5	London	England	Brixton Academy
November 6	London	England	Brixton Academy
November 9	Barcelona	Spain	Sala Bikini
Australia
November 21	Sydney	Australia	Hordern Pavilion
November 22	Brisbane	Australia	Brisbane Entertainment Centre
November 24	Melbourne	Australia	Festival Hall
November 25	Adelaide	Australia	Thebarton Theatre
November 27	Auckland	New Zealand	St. James Theatre
North America
December 3	Anaheim	United States	Honda Center
December 5	Tacoma	United States	Tacoma Dome
December 10	New York City	United States	Madison Square Garden
December 11	Minneapolis	United States	Target Center
December 12	Sunrise	United States	BankAtlantic Center
2005
January 1	Las Vegas	United States	Aladdin Hotel
March 15	Austin	United States	Austin Rodeo
March 16	Houston	United States	Reliant Stadium
Canada
April 11	Montreal	Canada	Bell Center
April 12	Toronto	Canada	Air Canada Centre
May 1	Vancouver	Canada	Pacific Coliseum
Europe
May 31	Madrid	Spain	La Riviera
June 2	Skive	Denmark	Strandtangen
June 3	Nurburg	Germany	Nurburgring
June 4	Nuremberg	Germany	Zeppelinfeld
June 7	Paris	France	Le Zenith
North America
June 11	Las Vegas	United States	MGM Grand Garden Arena
June 12	Reno	United States	Reno Hilton Amphitheater
July 2	St. Louis	United States	Benjamin Franklin Parkway
July 13	Santa Barbara	United States	Santa Barbara Bowl
July 27	Paso Robles	United States	California Mid-State Fairgrounds
July 30	Atlantic City	United States	Borgata Hotel Casino & Spa
July 31	Toms River	United States	Ritacco Center
Europe
August 19	London	England	Carling Apollo Hammersmith
August 20	Chelmsford	England	Hylands Park
August 21	Weston Park	England	Weston-under-Lizard
August 23	Belfast	Ireland	Botanic Gardens
August 24	Dublin	Ireland	Lansdowne Road

Festivals and other miscellaneous performances

^{A} This concert was a part of the "Now & Zen Festival"
^{B} This concert was a part of the "Jim Beam Concert Series"
^{C} This concert was a part of "Maroon Fridays"
^{D} This concert was a part of the "Spring Weekend Concert"
^{E} This concert was a part of the "Spring Concert"
^{F} This concert was a part of the "Lawnparties"
^{G} This concert was a part of "SunCom Concerts at The Point"
^{H} This concert was a part of "Your Show"
^{I} This concert was a part of "Wango Tango"
^{J} This concert was a part of "Zootopia"
^{K} This concert was a part of the "Kiss Concert"
^{L} This concert was a part of the "San Diego County Fair"
^{M} This concert was a part of "Red, White and Boom"
^{N} This concert was a part of the "Antelope Valley Fair"
^{O} This concert was a part of the "Ralph's Supermarket Concert Series"
^{P} This concert was a part of the "SWR3 New Pop Festival"
^{Q} This concert was a part of "Mixfest"
^{R} This concert was a part of the "Western Washington Fair"

Cancellations and rescheduled shows

October 6, 2003	Houston, Texas	Engine Room	Moved to the Ground Hall
November 10, 2003	Omaha, Nebraska	Music Box	Cancelled
November 12, 2003	St. Louis, Missouri	The Gargoyle	Moved to The Pageant
November 16, 2003	Albuquerque, New Mexico	Sunshine Theater	Rescheduled to October 1, 2003
April 17, 2004	Sydney, Australia	Gaelic Club	Rescheduled to April 15, 2004
June 13, 2004	Manchester, Tennessee	Great Stage Park	Cancelled. This performed was a part of the "Bonnaroo Music Festival"
October 2, 2004	West Springfield, Massachusetts	Comcast Stage	Cancelled. This concert was a part of the Eastern States Exposition.
October 4, 2004	Cambridge, England	Cambridge Corn Exchange	Cancelled
October 8, 2004	Glasgow, Scotland	Barrowland Ballroom	Moved to the Clyde Auditorium
October 13, 2004	Bristol, England	Carling Academy	Cancelled
October 18, 2004	Copenhagen, Denmark	K.B. Hallen	Moved to the Valby-Hallen
October 19, 2004	Stockholm, Sweden	Klubben	Moved to the Cirkus
October 20, 2004	Hamburg, Germany	Große Freiheit 36	Moved to the CCH Saal 3
October 24, 2004	Zürich, Switzerland	Volkshaus	Moved to the X-tra
October 25, 2004	Munich, Germany	Georg-Elser-Hallen	Moved to the Tonhalle
October 29, 2004	Paris, France	Le Trabendo	Moved to La Cigale
October 31, 2004	Stuttgart, Germany	LKA Longhorn	Cancelled
