= Jinx (Waterparks album) =

Studio album by Waterparks
- Released: July 24, 2026
- Length: 40:28
- Label: BMG
- Producers: Zakk Cervini; Awsten Knight; Jared Poythress; Nick Zinnanti

Waterparks chronology
Intellectual Property (2023)	Jinx (2026)

Singles from Jinx
- 1. "Red Guitar" Released: July 18, 2025; 2. "If Lyrics Were Confidential" Released: September 19, 2025; 3. "Any Minute Now" Released: November 14, 2025; 4. "Prowler" Released: April 17, 2026; 5. "Better Than Therapy" Released: June 26, 2026

Jinx is the sixth studio album by the American pop rock band Waterparks. It was released on July 24, 2026 through BMG Rights Management.

== Background ==
Following the release of their fifth studio album Intellectual Property in April 2023, the band initially announced their sixth album to be a sequel record to its predecessor, titled Intellectual Property 2: Lost in the Property. The album's lead single "Sneaking Out of Heaven" was released on October 11, 2023. On May 26, 2024, the album's second single, "Soulsucker". However, in August 2024, Waterparks' frontman Awsten Knight announced that the album was cancelled, stating that "the universe is working against this project and [he is] tired of fighting it."

Following the cancellation of Intellectual Property 2, Knight approached the next album with “light, love, and luck.” Jinx was primarily recorded in Long Island, New York. Knight focused on making an album that was better than its predecessors, stating that it was the band's most challenging. Knight described the album's concept, stating that "it really is about finding yourself in those moments and trying to get a better grip on who you are."

Regarding the album's title, Knight said: "Jinx makes perfect sense. Things have felt so unlucky and so weird and so crazy. So much crazy shit happens with this band. But then at the same time, I simultaneously feel like the luckiest person on earth [...] It perfectly encapsulates the energy of the album".

== Music and lyrics ==
The album opens with "Tell Me Why", recorded in collaboration with Mark Hoppus, Danny Elfman, Eric Nally and the American pop-punk project Sorry My Love. Knight stated that the track "feels you're dressing a stage for a play" with lyrics speaking of death and resurrection. The song is followed up by the track "Red Guitar", which covers topic of fame's cost, while the third song "If Lyrics Were Confidential" is a satire aimed at music executives. The fourth track "Prowler" addresses topics of the band's fame and success.

"Gwen Stefani" is a satirical song that references the American singer and songwriter of the same name and was described by Knight as an "anti-social story". The band began working on this song during development of their fourth album Greatest Hits, but according to Knight, it "wasn't good enough for that album". Due to high demand from the fans, Knight decided to rework and release the song on Jinx.

The ninth track "Playing Music" is an ode to the process of making music. According to Knight, the song was written in 10 minutes. "Mirage" is a midtempo ballad. The twelfth track, "Any Minute Now," is another ballad, which lyrically speaks of the imperfection of life. The closing track "Girls Need Guns" reflects on misogyny in American society and features spoken-word parts recorded by Awsten's mother, Virginia Knight.

== Singles ==
The album's lead single "Red Guitar" was released on July 18, 2025, followed by "If Lyrics Were Confidential" on September 19 and "Any Minute Now" on November 14. The next single "Prowler" was released on April 17, 2026 along with the album's announcement. It was followed by "Better Than Therapy" on June 26.

== Critical reception ==
Professional ratings
Review scores
Source	Rating
Dork	4/5 stars
Kerrang!	4/5

The album received mostly positive reviews. Dan Harrison from Dork commented on the album's lyrics, stating, "Knight has always treated lyric sheets as open diaries, up to and including naming names. This one covers three years of material for raw honesty, and it doesn't pull the punch." James Hickle of Kerrang! stated that "Jinx certainly deserves several hundred bouquets for being so singular, so strange, and so deliciously self-indulgent."

== Track listing ==
All lyrics are written by Awsten Knight and Joe Ragosta; all music is composed by Waterparks.

Jinx track listing
No.	Title	Writer(s)	Length
1.	"Tell Me Why" (featuring Mark Hoppus, Danny Elfman, Eric Nally, and Sorry My Love)	Awsten Knight; Danny Elfman; Dillon Francis; Mark Hoppus; Eric Nally; Joe Ragosta; Nick Zinnanti	3:35
2.	"Red Guitar"	A. Knight; J. Ragosta; Zinnanti	2:26
3.	"If Lyrics Were Confidential"	A. Knight; J. Ragosta; Robert Ragosta; Zinnanti	2:50
4.	"Prowler"	A. Knight; J. Ragosta	2:45
5.	"Better Than Therapy"	A. Knight; Zakk Cervini; J. Ragosta	3:00
6.	"Nobody But You"	A. Knight; J. Ragosta; Zinnanti	2:38
7.	"Gwen Stefani"	A. Knight; J. Ragosta; Zinnanti	3:20
8.	"No No No No No"	A. Knight; Cervini; J. Ragosta	3:04
9.	"Playing Music"	A. Knight; J. Ragosta	3:58
10.	"Mirage"	A. Knight; J. Ragosta; Zinnanti	3:29
11.	"Tastes Like Tangerine"	A. Knight; J. Ragosta; Zinnanti	3:04
12.	"Any Minute Now"	A. Knight; J. Ragosta	3:15
13.	"Girls Need Guns"	A. Knight; Ginny Knight; Jared Poythress; J. Ragosta	3:04
Total length:			40:28

Jinx: Expansion Pack Apple Music exclusive bonus tracks
No.	Title	Writer(s)	Length
14.	"Tell Me Why" (no features)	A. Knight; Elfman; Francis; Hoppus; Nally; J. Ragosta; Zinnanti	3:35
15.	"Nobody But You" (acapella)	A. Knight; J. Ragosta; Zinnanti	2:30
16.	"Any Minute Now" (acoustic)	A. Knight; J. Ragosta	3:21
17.	"If Lyrics Were Confidential" (day 1 start demo)	A. Knight; J. Ragosta; R. Ragosta; Zinnanti	1:41
Total length:			51:35

== Personnel ==
Credits are adapted from Apple Music.

=== Waterparks ===
- Awsten Knight – vocals, guitar (all tracks); bass, synthesizer (tracks 1, 4–11, 13–15, 17); production (2–4, 7, 9–11, 13, 17), engineering (13), mastering (16, 17), programming (17)
- Geoff Wigington – guitar (2, 3, 12)
- Otto Wood – drums (1–4, 9–12, 14)

=== Additional contributors ===
- Nick Zinnanti – production (1–3, 6, 7, 9–11, 14, 15, 17), programming (1, 2, 7, 9–11, 14, 15), vocals (1, 7, 9–11, 14), synthesizer (1, 9–11, 14), guitar (1, 9, 10, 14), background vocals (2), engineering (4), mixing (6, 9–11, 15), piano (9, 10), mastering (9, 11, 15)
- Zakk Cervini – production (4, 5, 8, 12, 16), mixing (1, 3–5, 7, 8, 12–14, 16, 17), additional vocals (12)
- Jared Poythress – production (13), additional production (1, 3, 6, 7, 9, 10, 12, 14, 16, 17)
- Dillon Francis – additional production (11)
- Alex Ghenea – mixing (2)
- Julian Gariulo – mixing assistance (1, 4–8, 13, 14, 17)
- Chris Gehringer – mastering (1–8, 10, 12–14)
- Joe Ragosta – vocals (1, 4–11, 14), background vocals (2), additional vocals (12)
- Mark Hoppus – vocals (1)
- Danny Elfman – vocals (1)
- Eric Nally – vocals (1)
- Sorry My Love – vocals (1)
- Lucas Hand – background vocals (2)
- Lucy Cervini – additional vocals (12)
- Ginny Knight – vocals (13)

== Charts ==
Chart performance for Jinx
Chart (2026)	Peak position
Australian Albums (ARIA)	39
Scottish Albums (Official Charts)	23
UK Albums Sales (Official Charts)	19
UK Independent Albums (Official Charts)	5
US Billboard 200	132
US Independent Albums (Billboard)	16
US Top Rock & Alternative Albums (Billboard)	35
