= 5th Annual Honda Civic Tour =

2005 tour by Maroon 5

- Tour by Various
- Promotional poster for the tour
- Start date: March 11, 2005
- End date: May 13, 2005
- Legs: 1
- No. of shows: 37
- Website: Tour Website (Archived)

Various concert chronology
- 4th Annual Honda Civic Tour (2004); 5th Annual Honda Civic Tour (2005); 6th Annual Honda Civic Tour (2006)
Maroon 5 chronology
| Songs About Jane Tour (2003–2005) | 5th Annual Honda Civic Tour (2005) | Songs About Jane Tour (2003–2005) |

The 5th Annual Honda Civic Tour was a concert tour headlined by Maroon 5.

== Background ==
After multiple nominations at the 47th Annual Grammy Awards, the Marketing Factory announced that Maroon 5 would headline the fifth edition of the Honda Civic Tour. This outing was announced in January 2005, during a press conference at Whisky a Go Go.

During the tour, the band performed standalone concerts in Toronto and Vancouver, with additional shows at the Houston Livestock Show and Rodeo and Star of Texas Fair & Rodeo.

The final performance on May 13, 2005, at the Santa Barbara Bowl was recorded and released on the Live – Friday the 13th live album on September 20, 2005.

== Personnel ==
Crew

- Sound Company : Rat Sound
- Bands FOH Engineer : Bryan Boyt
- Band Monitor Engineer : Andy Ebert
- Monitor Technician: Mark Humphries
- System Technician: Nick Brisbois
- Assistant Technician: Jamie Harris
- Tour Manager: Fred Kharrazi
- Production Manager: Joe Lennane

== Opening acts ==
- Phantom Planet (select dates)
- The Donnas (select dates)
- The Thrills (select dates)
- Simon Dawes (select dates)

== Setlist ==
The following setlist was obtained from the concert held on May 13, 2005, at the Santa Barbara Bowl in Santa Barbara, California, recorded for the live album Live – Friday the 13th. It does not represent all concerts for the duration of the tour.

1. "Shiver
2. "Through with You"
3. "Tangled"
4. "Harder to Breathe"
5. "The Sun"
6. "Wasted Years"
7. "Secret" (contains excerpts from "Ain't No Sunshine")
8. "Not Coming Home"
9. "This Love"
10. "Must Get Out"
11. "Sunday Morning"
12. "Sweetest Goodbye"

Encore

13. "Hello"
14. "She Will Be Loved"

== Shows ==
| Date | City (All U.S.) | Venue |
|---|---|---|
| March 11, 2005 | Los Angeles | Gibson Amphitheatre |
| March 13, 2005 | Los Angeles | Gibson Amphitheatre |
| March 18, 2005 | Corpus Christi | Concrete Street Amphitheater |
| March 19, 2005 | Grand Prairie | Nokia Live |
| March 21, 2005 | Duluth | Arena at Gwinnett Center |
| March 22, 2005 | Charlotte | Cricket Arena |
| March 24, 2005 | West Palm Beach | Sound Advice Amphitheatre |
| March 25, 2005 | Tampa | St. Pete Times Forum |
| March 26, 2005 | Kissimmee | Silver Spurs Arena |
| March 28, 2005 | Norfolk | Constant Convocation Center |
| March 29, 2005 | University Park | Bryce Jordan Center |
| March 31, 2005 | Morgantown | WVU Coliseum |
| April 1, 2005 | Philadelphia | Liacouras Center |
| April 2, 2005 | Boston | Agganis Arena |
| April 4, 2005 | Amherst | Mullins Center |
| April 6, 2005 | New York City | Radio City Music Hall |
| April 7, 2005 | New York City | Radio City Music Hall |
| April 8, 2005 | New York City | Radio City Music Hall |
| April 14, 2005 | Auburn Hills | The Palace of Auburn Hills |
| April 15, 2005 | Pittsburgh | Palumbo Center |
| April 16, 2005 | Columbia | Merriweather Post Pavilion |
| April 18, 2005 | Cleveland | Wolstein Center |
| April 19, 2005 | Chicago | UIC Pavilion |
| April 21, 2005 | St. Louis | Savvis Center |
| April 22, 2005 | Milwaukee | Eagles Ballroom |
| April 23, 2005 | Saint Paul | Xcel Energy Center |
| April 25, 2005 | Lincoln | Pershing Center |
| April 26, 2005 | Denver | Pepsi Center |
| April 29, 2005 | Portland | Memorial Coliseum |
| April 30, 2005 | Everett | Everett Events Center |
| May 4, 2005 | Fresno | Save Mart Center |
| May 5, 2005 | San Jose | HP Pavilion |
| May 6, 2005 | Sacramento | ARCO Arena |
| May 8, 2005 | Anaheim | The Theater at Arrowhead Pond |
| May 9, 2005 | San Diego | Jenny Craig Pavilion |
| May 11, 2005 | Phoenix | Cricket Pavilion |
| May 13, 2005 | Santa Barbara | Santa Barbara Bowl |

=== Box office score data ===
| Venue | City | Attendance | Gross revenue |
|---|---|---|---|
| Gibson Amphitheatre | Los Angeles | 11,521 / 11,521 (100%) | $399,488 |
| Nokia Live | Grand Prairie | 5,847 / 5,847 (100%) | $207,105 |
| Sound Advice Amphitheatre | West Palm Beach | 7,695 / 7,695 (100%) | $278,715 |
| St. Pete Times Forum | Tampa | 8,190 / 9,680 (85%) | $279,897 |
| Liacouras Center | Philadelphia | 9,082 / 9,082 (100%) | $305,410 |
| Radio City Music Hall | New York City | 17,886 / 17,886 (100%) | $718,305 |
| The Palace of Auburn Hills | Auburn Hills | 11,943 / 11,943 (100%) | $388,885 |
| UIC Pavilion | Chicago | 8,262 / 8,262 (100%) | $287,170 |
| Xcel Energy Center | Saint Paul | 11,690 / 11,690 (100%) | $389,270 |
| Save Mart Center | Fresno | 8,314 / 8,314 (100%) | $290,990 |
| HP Pavilion | San Jose | 13,021 / 13,021 (100%) | $434,875 |
| ARCO Arena | Sacramento | 11,866 / 11,866 (100%) | $335,980 |
| The Theater at Arrowhead Pond | Anaheim | 7,402 / 7,402 (100%) | $259,310 |
| TOTAL | | 132,719 / 134,209 (99%) | $4,575,400 |
