= Justin Levinson =

American singer-songwriter

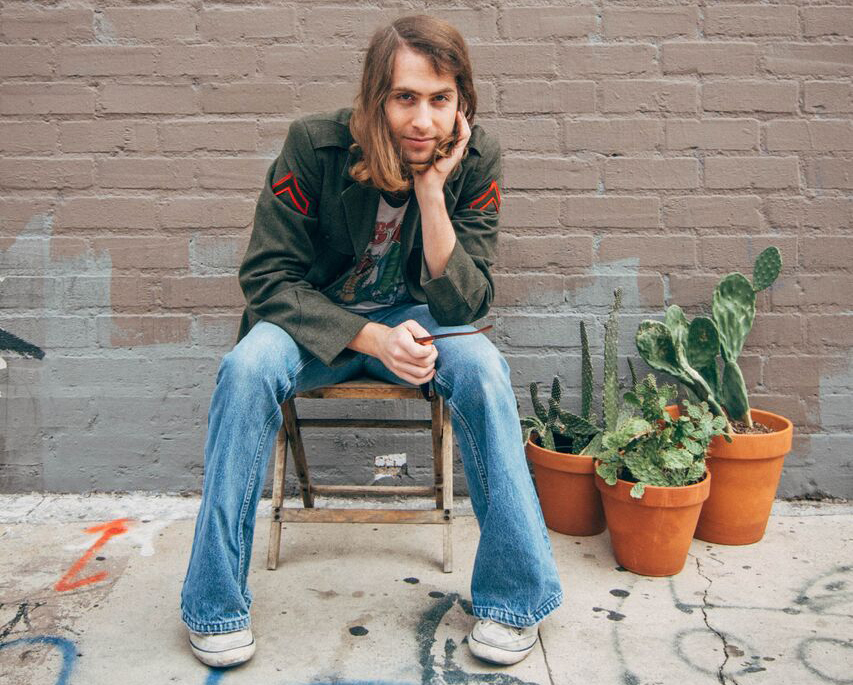

Background information
- Born: September 9, 1985 (age 40); Vergennes, Vermont, U.S.
- Occupation: Singer-songwriter
- Instruments: Vocals, piano, guitar, trumpet, trombone
- Years active: 2006–present
- Website: www.justinlevinson.com

Justin Levinson is an American singer-songwriter from Vermont.

== Music career ==
The son of singer-songwriter Bob Levinson, Justin Levinson grew up in Vergennes. In high school, he was introduced to Lester Bowie and Fontella Bass, who were traveling on a grant to bring jazz to rural areas. He attended Berklee College of Music in Boston, accepted in part due to a letter of recommendation from Bowie. He started out studying jazz trumpet, before switching to and getting his degree in songwriting.

On his earlier releases, Levinson's sound has drawn many comparisons to Ben Folds.

=== 1175 Boylston ===
Levinson released his first album, 1175 Boylston, in 2006, while a student at Berklee. On the album (which was named after Levinson's address at the time), he supplied the vocals and played piano, trumpet and trombone while his father played guitar, bass and drums on some tracks, with fellow Berklee student Adam Popick supplying the remaining instruments. The single "City With Two Streetlights" spent eight weeks on the CMJ Top 25 charts. Faculty members of the Berklee songwriting department also voted the album's opening track “Sunny Day” the best song of the year. Following the album's release, Levinson played the 2006 International Pop Overthrow Festival, and was named Best Male Artist at The 4th Annual IAMA (International Acoustic Music Awards).

=== Bury Your Love ===
In 2007, Levinson, by then a graduate of Berklee, released his second album, Bury Your Love. Many reviews of this record noted the influence of Elton John. The same year, he won the ASCAPLUS award and was a finalist in the USA Songwriting Competition.

=== Predetermined Fate ===
Levinson's 2009 release, Predetermined Fate, had a more country-influenced style. One single on the album, "Waiting For Someone To Love Me", was played heavily on Sirius, and he was nominated for the Sirius singer-songwriter discovery of the year. Another track, “Losing You To Tennessee”, was featured on Virgin Airlines flights.

=== This Side of Me, This Side of You ===
In 2012, Levinson released This Side of Me, This Side of You, his first album with his band, The Valcours. The band is made up of Sean Witters on guitar, Seth Barbiero on bass, Josh Glass on organ and synthesizer, and Simon Plumpton on drums and sampler, with Levinson writing the songs, and the group writing the arrangements. Levinson plays piano and provides vocals. The album included a number of guest contributions as well. Boston-based recording artist Will Dailey appeared on the track "Let You Go", Burlington singer/songwriter Gregory Douglass contributed to "Love You Goodbye", and Liz Longley was on "I Was So Wrong."

=== Take My Time ===
In 2013, Levinson released the three-song EP Take My Time. Noted in reviews as a slight departure from his work with the Valcours, the EP took a more country-influenced turn on the third and final track, “Bid The Rest Goodbye”, which employs steel guitars and fiddles.

=== Yes Man ===
Early 2017, Justin Levinson released his fifth studio album Yes Man. The album was produced by Adam Popick. After touring California, he was invited by Songs & Whispers, a European booking agency, to tour Germany, the Netherlands, and Belgium.

During 2018, Justin Levinson collaborated with Anna Nalick on a new single titled A Part of Me.

=== Collamer Circle ===
Collamer Circle is the fifth full-length studio album by Justin Levinson. The album is a collaboration with fellow Vermont musician Ben Patton.

=== Live performances ===
Levinson has played live in support of Apollo Sunshine, Serena Ryder, The Verve Pipe, Big Head Todd and the Monsters, Matt Wertz, Chris Barron of the Spin Doctors, Grand Archives and Zox. He toured with One Tree Hill star and singer-songwriter Tyler Hilton. He has toured with Aaron Carter, opening on select dates of the After Party Tour, as well as with Teddy Geiger and Howie Day. He has appeared at NXNE and the Boston International Pop Overthrow. He has also made television performances, including on Bangor's WLBZ, Connecticut's WTNH, Backstage With Barry Nolan (Comcast), The 10 Show! (NBC Philadelphia), NECN Morning News, Fox 44 Boston, Plum TV on Martha’s Vineyard and Late Night Saturday WCAX Burlington, Vermont.

== Film industry ==
Levinson wrote and performed a song for the 2013 film The Den, entitled "Love You Goodbye".

== Work with Champlain Community Services ==
Levinson works for Champlain Community Services, an organization dedicated to help provide services and self-advocacy to developmentally disabled adults. He facilitates a show called The Advocacy Team, which airs on Vermont Community Access Media. The show features clients of Champlain Community Services interviewing local celebrities.

== Discography ==
Artist	Title	Format	Label	Year
Justin Levinson	1175 Boylston	CD	OutTake Records	2006
Justin Levinson	Bury Your Love	CD	OutTake Records	2007
Justin Levinson	Predetermined Fate	CD	None	2009
Justin Levinson & The Valcours	This Side of Me, This Side of You	CD	Justin Levinson & The Valcours	2012
Justin Levinson	Take My Time	CD EP	Justin Levinson	2013
Justin Levinson	Yes Man	CD	Justin Levinson	2017
Justin Levinson	Collamer Circle	CD	Justin Levinson	2023
