= Waterparks (band) =

American pop rock band

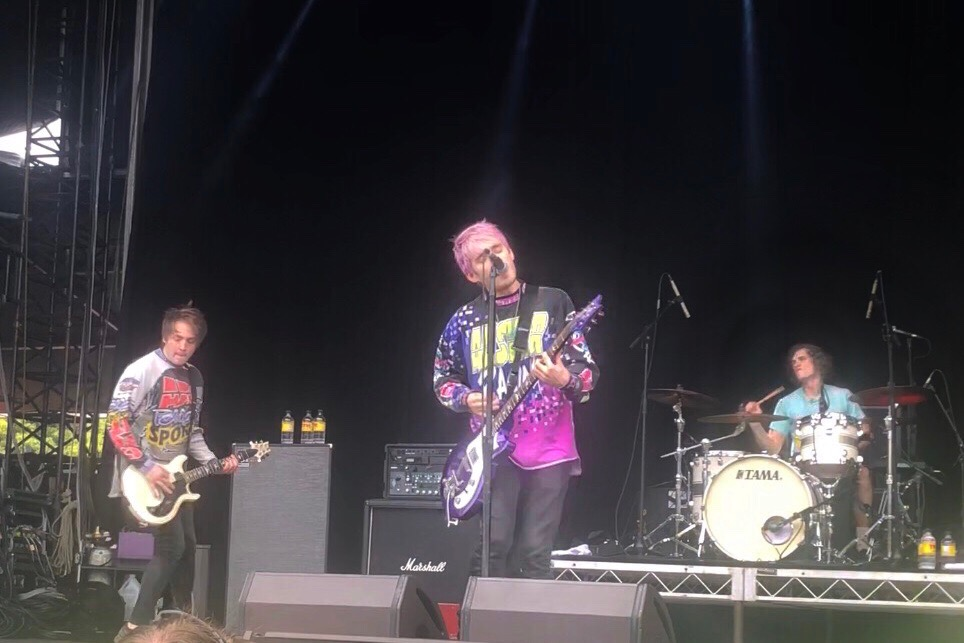
- Waterparks performing at Good Things Festival in 2018. From left to right: Geoff Wigington, Awsten Knight, and Otto Wood

Background information
- Origin: Houston, Texas, U.S.
- Genres: Pop-punk; pop rock; electropop; alternative rock; hyperpop
- Works: Waterparks discography
- Years active: 2011–present
- Labels: BMG; Fueled by Ramen; 300; Hopeless; Equal Vision
- Members: Awsten Knight; Geoff Wigington; Otto Wood
- Past members: Gage Matthieu; Owen Marvin; Tommy Denley; Tyler Comer
- Website: waterparksband.com

Waterparks is an American pop rock band formed in Houston, Texas in 2011. The group currently consists of lead vocalist and rhythm guitarist Awsten Knight, backing vocalist and lead guitarist Geoff Wigington, and backing vocalist and drummer Otto Wood.

The band has released three EPs, two of which were released independently while the third was released via Equal Vision. The band released their debut studio album, Double Dare, on November 4, 2016, via Equal Vision, then later their second studio album Entertainment under the same label on January 26, 2018. On May 23, 2019, the band announced that they had left Equal Vision and signed on with Hopeless. Their third studio album, entitled Fandom, was released on October 11, 2019. The band then signed with 300 Entertainment and their fourth studio album, Greatest Hits, was released on May 21, 2021. The band signed with Fueled by Ramen in 2022, and their fifth studio album, Intellectual Property, was released in April 2023. In 2025, the band signed to BMG. Their sixth studio album, Jinx, was released in July 2026.

The band's music has mostly been described as pop-punk, pop rock, electropop, and alternative rock. Their newer releases have been described as hyperpop and hip hop/rap.

== History ==
=== 2011–2015: Formation and EPs ===
The band was formed in 2011 by Awsten Knight and Gage Matthieu, who met while playing in different bands including The Blue Poptarts. The band was later joined by drummer Owen Marvin, guitarist Tommy Denley, and briefly, keyboardist Tyler Comer. This lineup soon dissipated before the band's first release. Their first EP, Airplane Conversations, was released independently on April 3, 2012, and was the only release with Matthieu and Marvin before they both left the band in 2012. Guitarist Geoff Wigington and drummer Otto Wood joined the band that same year following the prior departures. The band's first show was on August 17, 2012 at Warehouse Live in Houston alongside Invent, Animate, DWHB, and Life as Lions. The band continued performing at local venues throughout Texas over the following years. The band performed as a supporting act for pop musician Aaron Carter, opening his Houston tour date on May 11, 2013. Their second EP, Black Light, was released on June 5, 2014. The band also performed on the Houston dates of the Warped Tour in 2013 and 2015.

On November 6, 2015, the band signed with label Equal Vision Records. After searching for producers, the band chose twins Benji Madden and Joel Madden of Good Charlotte as their managers. On January 15, 2016, the group released an EP titled Cluster, co-produced by Benji Madden. Mikey Way, known as the bassist of My Chemical Romance, played bass for the EP. On November 19, 2015, the band performed with Good Charlotte during the group's comeback performance at The Troubadour in West Hollywood, California.

=== 2016–2018: Double Dare and Entertainment ===
The group performed on the Black Cat Tour supporting Never Shout Never in 2016, and on every date of the 2016 Warped Tour. The band then embarked on the End The Madness Tour supporting Sleeping with Sirens in late 2016.

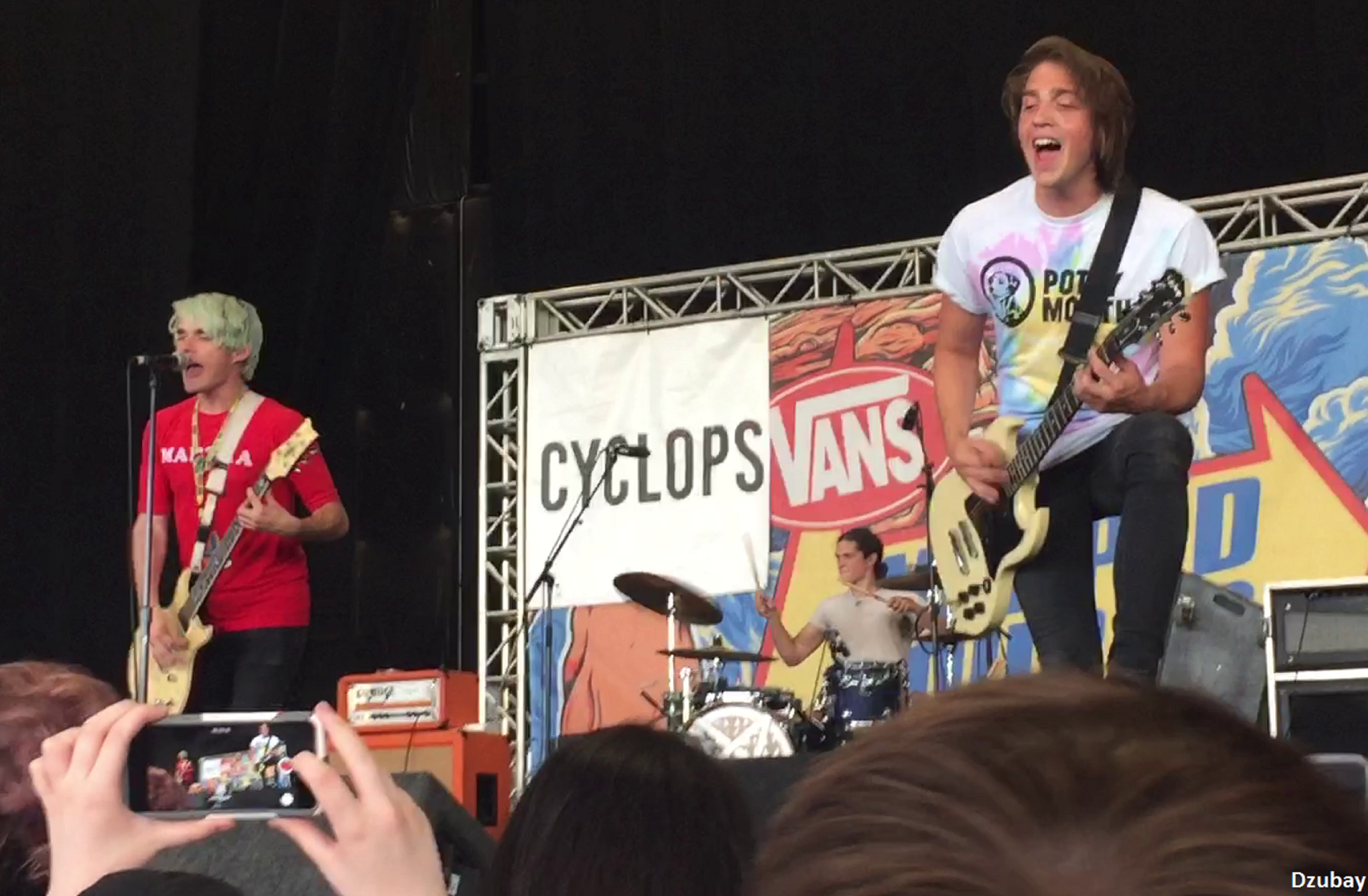
Waterparks performing on Warped Tour 2016

The group released a single titled "Stupid For You" on August 31, 2016 in promotion of its debut album, Double Dare. They later released two additional singles, "Hawaii (Stay Awake)", and "Royal", before the album's release on November 4, 2016. In 2016, the band performed a cover of Hitchin' a Ride by Green Day and was featured on a 30th anniversary covers album for Green Day titled, Green Day: American Superhits!. "Gloom Boys" was made into the album's fourth and final single in 2017.

In March 2017, the group joined fellow bands SWMRS and The Wrecks as supporting acts on All Time Low's tour of the United Kingdom and Ireland. Later, during the Summer of 2017, the groups reunited for All Time Low's Young Renegades Tour, this time touring the United States. Night Riots performed in place of SWMRS on the tour's Dallas and Houston dates.

On October 20, 2017, the band announced their second studio album, Entertainment, with a release date of January 26, 2018. Alongside Entertainment's announcement, the band released the album's first single, "Blonde". On December 13, 2017, the band released the second single from the album, titled "Lucky People". On January 17, 2018, Waterparks released the third and final single from Entertainment, titled "Not Warriors". The album was released on January 26, 2018 via Equal Vision. Entertainment peaked at No. 98 on the Billboard 200 chart on February 10, 2018.

=== 2019–2021: Fandom and Greatest Hits ===
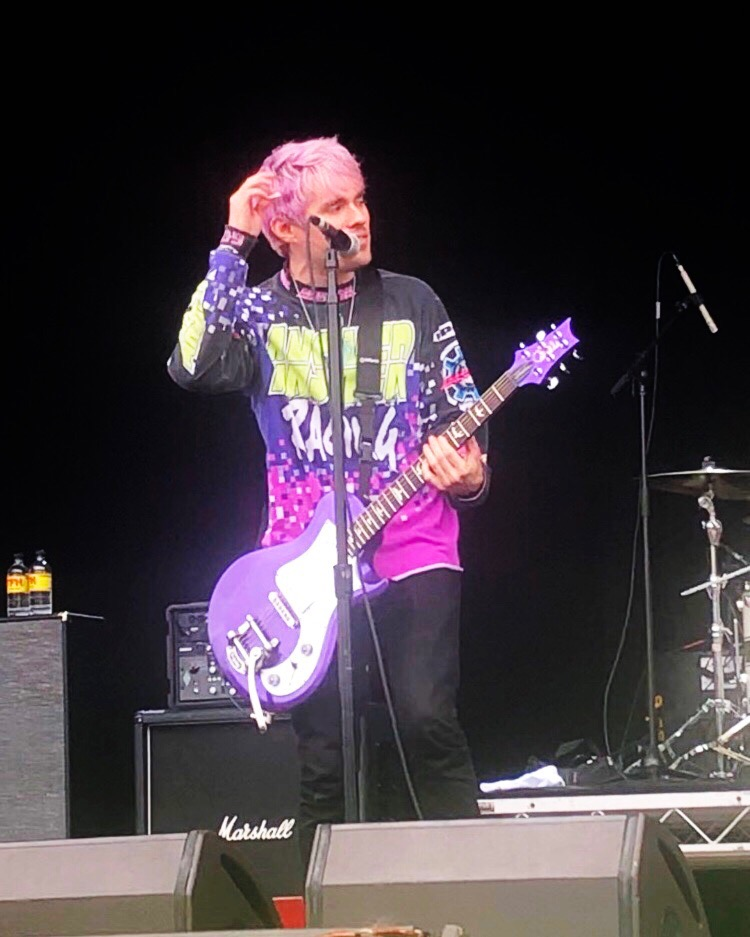
Lead vocalist, Awsten Knight performing with Waterparks in 2018

In 2019, the band performed a cover of "Beating Heart Baby" by Head Automatica and was featured on Rock Sound's covers album Worship And Tributes: Volume II. On May 23, 2019, the band released "Turbulent", their first single off of their third album. Along with the album's title it was also announced that the band had signed to Hopeless Records. On August 12, 2019, the band released the second single, "Watch What Happens Next", along with a music video and the announcement of the album to be released on October 11, 2019. On August 16, 2019, the band released their third single, "Dream Boy", along with a music video. On September 12, 2019, the fourth single, "[Reboot]" was released. On September 25, 2019, they released their fifth single for the album, "High Definition", along with a music video. The band's third studio album Fandom was released on October 11, 2019. On October 17, 2019, "Easy to Hate" was released as the sixth single, along with a music video.

On January 22, 2020, frontman Awsten Knight posted on Twitter that if a certain tweet was retweeted 20,000 times, that he would release a new Waterparks album that day. This goal was achieved within hours, subsequently forcing Knight to release a SoundCloud collection titled 1 (A Collection of Unreleased Home Demos, This is Not G, or Even an Album, Shut Up Enjoy), a demo album that consists of unreleased Waterparks demos, including songs Knight has teased on his Instagram some of which were "Lemonade", "Noise", and "Glitter Times". He states in the song "Life Is Puke (20,000)" that he never thought the tweet would actually make it to that many retweets and that "everyone is so mad at me."

When the band performed at the O2 Academy in Birmingham, England during the Fandom tour on January 27, 2020, they announced that the performance would be taped and released as a live album, with a companion concert film, that summer. The COVID-19 pandemic delayed the release until the fall, and Fandom: Live in the UK was officially released on November 27, 2020, formally marking the end of the Fandom era.

On September 24, 2020, the band officially released a song entitled "Lowkey As Hell". This comes after Knight leaked the song the previous week on a live stream whilst cutting off his Fandom-era green hair himself. Following the song's official release, record label 300 Entertainment announced that they had signed the band.

On February 25, 2021, the band announced their fourth studio album Greatest Hits, along with the release of a new single titled "Snow Globe". The album was released on May 21, 2021. The next single, titled "Numb" was released on March 29, 2021, but was debuted on March 27 during the Anti Tour Performance. The fourth single, "You'd Be Paranoid Too (If Everyone Was Out To Get You)", was released on April 28, 2021, sharing its title with an autobiography written by vocalist and rhythm guitarist Awsten Knight. The fifth single, "Just Kidding", was released on May 12, 2021. The sixth single, "Violet!", was released on May 19, 2021. A music video was released for the song on May 26, 2021.

=== 2022–2024: Intellectual Property and standalone singles ===
On January 27, 2022, the band posted teasers for their upcoming fifth studio album. On April 7, 2022, the first single, "Funeral Grey" was announced, and was then subsequently released on May 13 as their first release under Fueled by Ramen. In 2022, the band's song "Telephone," from their 2019 album Fandom, was featured in episode three of the British TV series Heartstopper. On July 5, 2022, the band announced the second single, "Self-Sabotage" to be released on July 7. The band also released a teaser of a new song titled "Brainwashed" that the band had been performing on tour. On August 8, 2022, the band released a music video for "Self-Sabotage". On August 30, 2022, the band debuted a new song live titled "Real Super Dark" from the upcoming album. On October 14, 2022, the band released the single "Fuck About It", featuring Blackbear. On November 23, 2022, the band announced the title of their fifth studio album, Intellectual Property. On December 1, 2022, the band released a music video for "Fuck About It". On January 26, 2023, the band released the album's fourth single, "Real Super Dark". The band also confirmed the release date for the album to be April 14, 2023. On March 10, 2023, the band released the album's fifth single, "Brainwashed".

On October 11, 2023, the band released the single "Sneaking Out of Heaven", treated as part of Intellectual Property on streaming services. An accompanying music video was released on October 12, 2023.

On May 26, 2024, the band released the single, "Soulsucker", from their upcoming sixth studio album, Intellectual Property 2: Lost in the Property which will be released independently. A music video for the song was released two days later. On June 28, 2024, the band released "FAI2", featuring Zeph, a re-imagined version of Fuck About It (2023).

On August 2, 2024, the band released a statement on Instagram announcing that the album had been canceled. On August 4, 2024, the band released one more single from the album, titled "Guilt (Interlude)". On August 16, 2024, the band released "GH2024", a medley of songs from their 2021 album, Greatest Hits.

On October 15, 2024, the band released a second demo collection titled 2 (A Collection of Unreleased Home Demos, This is Not J, or Even an Album, Shut Up Enjoy), consisting of the tracks "Call Me Beep Me - Demo" and "Talking to Myself - Demo." The band was featured on Michael Clifford's single "Give Me A Break!", which was released on May 23, 2025; the track was later released on Clifford's debut solo album Sidequest.

=== 2025–present: Jinx ===
On July 3, 2025, the band announced that they had signed a record deal with BMG. Along with the renouncement, the band started teasing new music. On July 11, it was announced that the single, "Red Guitar", would be released on July 18. The song's official music video was released on July 31, directed by Awsten Knight himself. On September 19, 2025, the band released the single, "If Lyrics Were Confidential", alongside a music video. On November 14, 2025, the band released the single, "Any Minute Now". On January 27, 2026, the band released a standalone single, "ICE", to support protests against ICE violence in the United States throughout the month. On April 17, 2026, Waterparks announced their sixth studio album, Jinx, released through BMG on July 24, 2026. The announcement was accompanied by the release of the album's fourth single, "Prowler". The album's fifth single, "Better Than Therapy", was released on June 26, 2026.

== Musical style and influences ==
Waterparks' musical style has been mainly described as pop-punk, pop rock, electropop, alternative rock, hyperpop, hip hop, alternative pop, electronic rock, emo, neon pop, and power pop. (Note: Musical styles: pop-punk, pop rock, electropop, alternative rock, hyperpop, hip hop, alternative pop, electronic rock, emo, neon pop, power pop) It also incorporates elements of punk, rap, bubblegum pop, electronic, indie, drum and bass, industrial, grunge, post-hardcore, dark pop, orchestral, emo rap, stadium rock, and lo-fi genres. (Note: elements: punk, rap, bubblegum pop; electronic, indie, drum and bass, industrial, grunge, post-hardcore, dark pop, orchestral, emo rap, stadium rock, lo-fi genres.) The band is said to derive their unique sound through the addition of vocal modulation, layered synthesizers, and fast vocals to the traditional rock sound. Frontman Awsten Knight has stated that he considers the group to be a rock band that has garnered significant inspiration from pop music. Since the departure of former bassist Gage Matthieu, the band has remained without a bass player in its official lineup, instead performing with a rotation of fill-in bass players or using pre-recorded backing tracks in live appearances, and Knight playing bass in-studio. They have cited Sum 41, Blink-182, Good Charlotte, Kesha, My Chemical Romance, Green Day, Fall Out Boy, No Doubt, Kanye West, the Beach Boys, Donald Glover, Tyler, the Creator, Taylor Swift, Chance the Rapper, Linkin Park, Paramore, and Saves the Day as musical influences.

== Band members ==
Current

- Awsten Knight – lead vocals, rhythm guitar, bass, programming (2011–present), lead guitar (2012)
- Geoff Wigington – lead guitar, backing vocals (2012–present)
- Otto Wood – drums, backing vocals (2012–present)

Former

- Gage Matthieu – bass (2011–2012)
- Owen Marvin – drums (2011–2012)
- Tommy Denley – lead guitar (2011)
- Tyler Comer – keyboards (2011)

Touring and session

- Mikey Way – bass (2016–2018)

== Discography ==
Studio albums

- Double Dare (2016)
- Entertainment (2018)
- Fandom (2019)
- Greatest Hits (2021)
- Intellectual Property (2023)
- Jinx (2026)

== Awards and nominations ==
Year	Award	Category	Nominated work	Result	Ref.
2017	Alternative Press Music Awards	Song of the Year	Stupid for You	Nominated	
2017	Alternative Press Music Awards	Album of the Year	Double Dare	Nominated	
2017	Alternative Press Music Awards	Best Breakthrough Artist	Waterparks	Won	
2017	Rock Sound Awards	Best International Breakthrough Artist	Waterparks	Won	
2018	Kerrang! Awards	Best International Breakthrough Artist	Waterparks	Nominated	
2019	Rock Sound Awards	Song of the Year	Turbulent	Won	
2025	Rock Sound Awards	Spirit of the Scene	Waterparks	Won	
