= Alexis Babini =

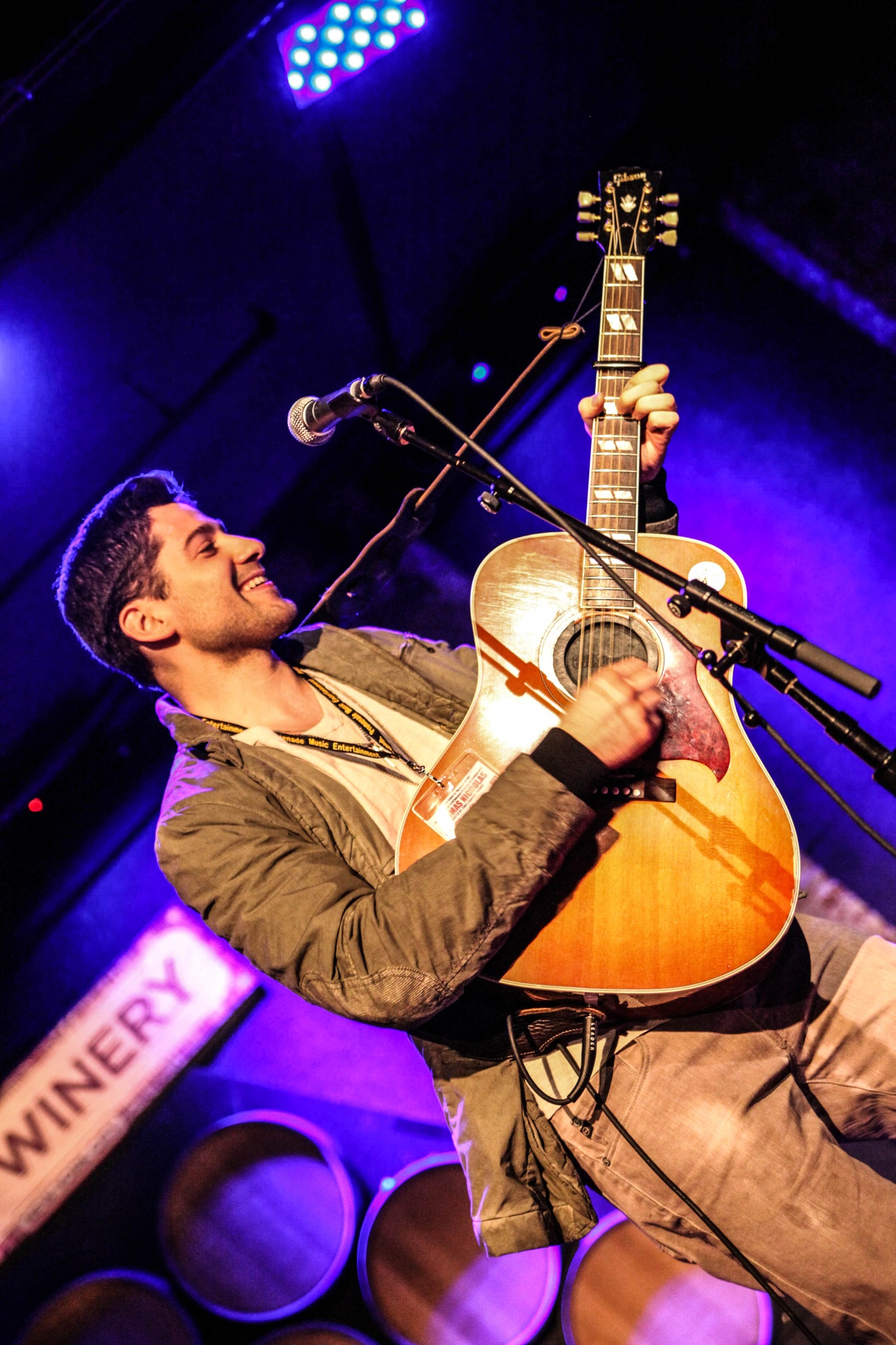
- Photo of Alexis Babini by Vladislav Grach

Background information
- Born: Easton, Connecticut, United States
- Genres: Pop
- Occupation: Musician
- Instrument: Guitar
- Years active: 2009-present

Alexis Babini is an American pop musician.

== Early life ==
Alexis Babini grew up in Easton, Connecticut, with early music influences including Brazilian bossa nova and The Beatles. He began playing the guitar at the age of 13.

== Career ==
In 2009, Babini self-released the album Breaking It In. In support of the album, he toured the US with Boz Scaggs, Dan Hicks, and Blues Traveler. He performed live on television such television station as Comcast Network and BNN TV. Babini's songs have been featured in media including The Real World: D.C. and he himself has been featured as a performer for the Fox Network music section of Xbox Live.

In 2011, Babini released the album Paint and Paper, again supporting with music appearances on NBC and ABC. He also toured in support of the album, opening for Aaron Carter. In 2013 Babini released the single Shut up and Kiss me as the first single of his new album Pioneer Spirit.

Babini is a supporter of Musicians on Call, a charity where musicians sing at local hospitals to sick children. He has described his music as a blend of folk, acoustic, and pop. In November, 2013, Babini created an animated music video for the second single, "Jackie", off his debut album. The video was featured shortly after on American Songwriter. In 2016, Alexis was featured as the banjo player on Younger (TV series). His song "Gimme Sunshine" was featured on the TV show Bringing Up Bates.
