= Entertainment (Waterparks album) =

Studio album by Waterparks
- Released: January 26, 2018
- Recorded: 2017
- Genres: Pop-punk; pop rock; electropop; synth-pop
- Length: 33:18
- Label: Equal Vision
- Producers: Benji Madden; Courtney Ballard

Waterparks chronology
Double Dare (2016)	Entertainment (2018)	Fandom (2019)

Singles from Entertainment
- 1. "Blonde" Released: October 20, 2017; 2. "Lucky People" Released: December 14, 2017; 3. "Not Warriors" Released: January 17, 2018

Entertainment is the second studio album by the American pop rock band Waterparks, released on January 26, 2018. It was produced by Benji Madden of Good Charlotte and was their final release under Equal Vision Records. The album debuted at number 85 in the UK and number 98 on the Billboard 200, spawning three singles: "Blonde", "Lucky People" and "Not Warriors".

== Promotion ==
On October 20, 2017, Waterparks revealed the album's title, artwork, and release date via social media, and released the first single from the record, "Blonde". Pre-orders for the album opened in tandem with the release of the "Blonde" official music video on November 2, 2017. The album's second and third singles, "Lucky People" and "Not Warriors", were released on December 14, 2017, and January 17, 2018, respectively.

== Composition ==
Musically, Entertainment has been described as pop punk, pop rock, pop, bubblegum pop, rock, electropop, and synth-pop. The album also uses elements of post-hardcore and dark pop.

== Critical reception ==
Professional ratings
Review scores
Source	Rating
Bring the Noise UK	7/10
Dead Press	8/10 stars
Dork	3/5 stars
GIG Soup	86%
New Noise Magazine	5/5 stars
Rock Sound	8/10 stars
Substream Magazine	4/5 stars
Wall of Sound	8/10

Phoebe Constable of Dead Press gave praise to Awsten Knight's vocals and the catchability throughout the track listing, concluding that "Ultimately, Entertainment is a consistently strong pop-rock release. [A] bit more variety in places would've been a nice touch, but nevertheless it doesn't stop it being an incredibly fun listen that's bound to be a great soundtrack to the summers ahead." Rob Sayce of Rock Sound praised the band for avoiding the sophomore slump by crafting a record that's "vibrant, surprising and borderline-scarily addictive" with a creative mix of various subgenres and Knight's "uniquely relatable" lyricism, concluding that, "By taking some huge risks and refusing to be to tied to any one lane, they've proved every doubter wrong." Logan White of Substream Magazine felt the album started off strong with its first two tracks and kept the momentum going with surprising forays into acoustic-driven love songs and electronic beats, concluding that "Entertainment is fun, catchy, and even a little bit unpredictable. Waterparks have pushed forward to become the best version of themselves that they can be, proving that they are here to stay." Dork writer Dan Harrison commented about the band's penchant for matching "awkward emotion" with a "day-glo" pop punk soundscape and sugary choruses over salty subject matter, saying "A juxtaposition that's proven effective time and time again, Entertainment may be more popcorn than a three course dinner, but it hits the spot every time."

In December 2018, Rock Sound listed Entertainment at number 5 in its Top 50 Albums of 2018 list, concluding "There was never a dull moment - and who would want it any other way?" Upset Magazine listed Entertainment at number 17 on its Best of 2018 list, with Stephen Ackroyd describing it as "a record that sparkles with star dust at every turn". Ackroyd commented that aspects of the album were "lifted magpie-like", but concluded "True originality is great, but it’s far from everything. Waterparks understand their world well enough to build within it far more effectively than they ever could by leaving it behind".

== Track listing ==
All lyrics are written by Awsten Knight; all music is composed by Waterparks.

Entertainment
No.	Title	Length
1.	"11:11"	3:28
2.	"Blonde"	3:21
3.	"Peach (Lobotomy)"	3:33
4.	"We Need to Talk"	3:25
5.	"Not Warriors"	3:32
6.	"Lucky People"	2:55
7.	"Rare"	3:40
8.	"Tantrum"	2:47
9.	"Crybaby"	2:51
10.	"Sleep Alone"	3:47
Total length:		33:18

Notes

- The track "Tantrum" is stylized in all caps.

== Personnel ==
Credits for Entertainment

Waterparks

- Awsten Knight – lead vocals, guitar, bass, additional programming
- Geoff Wigington – guitar
- Otto Wood – drums

Production

- Benji Madden – producer
- Courtney Ballard – producer, mixing, engineering
- Colin Schwanke – engineering
- Matt Lang – engineering
- Patrick Kehrier – engineering
- Bryan Gardner – mastering
- Jared Poythress – programming
- Marty Tzonev – cover art
- Bill Scoville – cover art layout

== Charts ==
Chart (2018)	Peak position
Scottish Albums (Official Charts)	62
UK Albums (Official Charts)	85
UK Rock & Metal Albums (Official Charts)	6
UK Independent Albums (Official Charts)	14
US Billboard 200	98
US Top Alternative Albums (Billboard)	7
US Top Rock Albums (Billboard)	13
