= Mardell =

Mardell is a surname. Notable people with the surname include:

- Alexandra Mardell (born 1993), English actress
- Alison Mardell (born 1968), British solicitor and senior RAF officer
- Mark Mardell (born 1957), British journalist
- Russell Mardell (born 1975), English writer and film director
