= Double Dare (Waterparks album) =

Studio album by Waterparks
- Released: November 4, 2016
- Studios: MDDN Studios (Burbank, California)
- Genres: Pop-punk; pop rock; electropop
- Length: 44:19
- Label: Equal Vision
- Producers: Benji Madden; Courtney Ballard

Waterparks chronology
Cluster EP (2016)	Double Dare (2016)	Entertainment (2018)

Singles from Double Dare
- 1. "Stupid for You" Released: August 31, 2016; 2. "Hawaii (Stay Awake)" Released: October 3, 2016; 3. "Royal" Released: October 24, 2016

Double Dare is the debut studio album by the American pop rock band Waterparks, released on November 4, 2016 by Equal Vision. The album garnered positive reviews from critics. Double Dare spawned three singles: "Stupid for You", "Hawaii (Stay Awake)" and "Royal".

== Composition ==
Musically, Double Dare has been described as pop punk, pop rock, and electropop.

== Promotion ==
On August 31, 2016, Waterparks revealed the album's title, artwork, and release date via social media and released the first single from the record, 'Stupid for You'. The first track, "Hawaii (Stay Awake)", premiered on September 30 on the Sirius XM Hits1 Pete Wentz's Hits and Misses Show and was released on October 3. On August 1, 2017, the band announced via their Twitter account that they joined Monster Energy's Outbreak Tour series with their Made in America Tour, with As It Is, Chapel and Sleep On It as their opening acts.

== Critical reception ==
Professional ratings
Review scores
Source	Rating
Alternative Press	4.5/5 stars
Dork	3/5 stars
Kerrang!	4/5 stars
Rock Sound	8/10
Upset	4/5 stars
The Young Folks	8/10

Mackenzie Hall of Alternative Press praised the album for combining "old-school Hellogoodbye electronic-pop" with hip hop music. Hall also compared the work to Twenty One Pilots. Reagan Harrison of The Young Folks gave praise to the genre-hopping style the band used for their pop punk soundscape throughout the album and the lyrical content having "deep topics" that deliver their messages with a "rebellious spirit", concluding that, "[T]he originality of the band should not be questioned. Even though their music includes multiple styles, it doesn't mean they don't have their own style. As the band grows, I expect for their tone to solidify and music style to become more definitive." Danny Randon of Upset praised the band for crafting energetic bangers ("Stupid for You, "Made in America") and arena rockers ("Gloom Boys", "Dizzy") that showcase their potential, concluding that, "[I]t may be sicklier than devouring a sherbet fountain in one near-suicidal necking, but there's enough chutzpah in the hooks to balance out the sweetness. Even in creating further opportunities to make waves, Waterparks have delivered on the promise of a big splash." Dork writer Steven Loftin called the record an "over-the-top but fun [nonetheless] listen", praising the band's self-awareness on tracks like "Made in America" and "Little Violence" but was critical of their venture into EDM on "Take Her to the Moon" being too removed from the rest of the album, concluding that "Double Dare is a solid debut that more than makes up for the misses with the hits. What the band do best, angst driven punk with minor electronic elements, is what should be focused on."

== Track listing ==
Double Dare
No.	Title	Length
1.	"Hawaii (Stay Awake)"	3:32
2.	"Gloom Boys"	3:27
3.	"Stupid for You"	3:11
4.	"Royal"	3:31
5.	"Take Her to the Moon"	3:14
6.	"Made in America"	2:48
7.	"Dizzy"	3:08
8.	"Powerless"	3:54
9.	"Little Violence"	3:23
10.	"21 Questions"	3:46
11.	"It Follows"	3:18
12.	"Plum Island"	3:33
13.	"I'll Always Be Around"	3:34
Total length:		44:19

Japan Bonus Tracks
No.	Title	Length
14.	"Candy"	3:28
15.	"What We Do For Fun"	3:26

== Personnel ==
Credits adapted from the liner notes of Double Dare.

Waterparks

- Awsten Knight – vocals, rhythm guitar, additional programming
- Geoff Wigington – lead guitar
- Otto Wood – drums

Technical

- Benji Madden – producer
- Courtney Ballard – engineering, mixing (for "Dizzy" and "It Follows")
- Joey Heck, Colin Schwanke, Samon Rajabnik, Zach Tush – additional engineers
- Jared Poythress, Awsten Knight – additional programming
- Brian Malouf – mixing (Cookie Jar Recording in Sherman Oaks, California)
- Tom Baker – mastering (Baker Mastering in Calabasas, California)

Artwork

- Nolis Anderson – cover image
- Bill Scoville – layout
