= Mission Theater and Pub =

Movie theater and pub in Portland, Oregon, United States

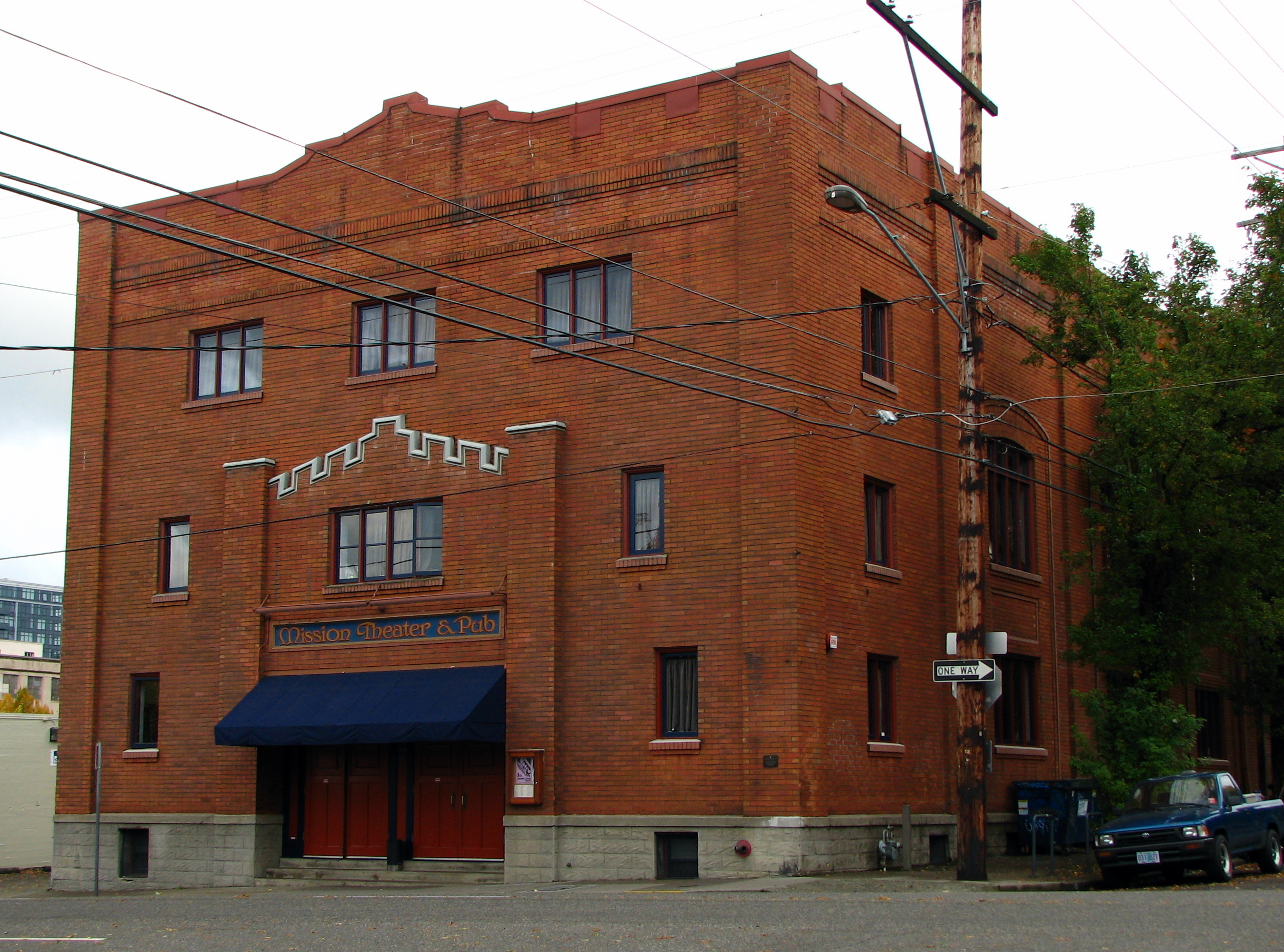
- The building's exterior in 2009
- Interactive map of Mission Theater and Pub
- Address: 1624 NW Glisan Street; Portland, Oregon; United States
- Coordinates: 45.52621°N 122.68812°W
- Owner: McMenamins
- Capacity: 300 (est.)

Construction
- Built: 1913
- Reopened: 1987

Website
- www.mcmenamins.com/mission-theater

The Mission Theater and Pub is a movie theater and pub located in the northwest Portland, Oregon. Formerly a Swedish church and union hall, the theater was re-opened as a McMenamins establishment in 1987. The theater was known for featuring second-run films, until 2019 when a first-run operation was implemented, and for serving beer, wine, and food.

== History ==
The building was built in 1913 and listed as the Swedish Evangelical Mission Covenant Church on the National Register of Historic Places on October 7, 1982.

== See also ==
- Church of Sweden
- National Register of Historic Places listings in Northwest Portland, Oregon
