= Adam Mardel =

American singer

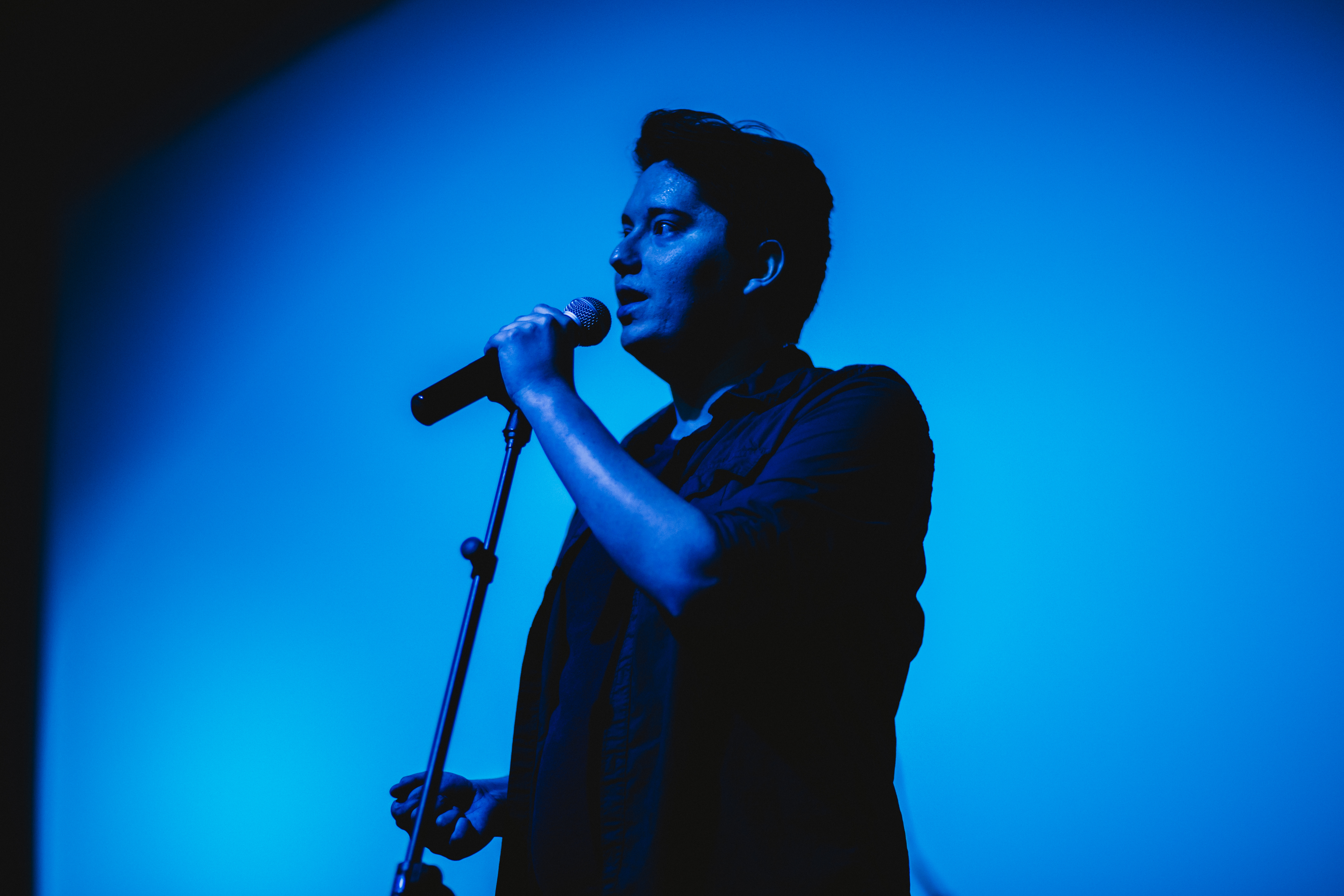
- Mardel in 2017
- Born: Adam Delmar Carpenter; April 27, 1989 (age 37); Arlington, Texas, U.S.
- Education: Fairmont High School, Sinclair Community College
- Occupations: Singer, songwriter, talent manager, a&r, voice actor
- Years active: 2008–present
- Spouse: Michael Liedke
- Children: 1
- Musical career
- Genres: Pop, Contemporary R&B, EDM
- Instrument: vocals
- Labels: Pickup Records, Eleven Twelve Records, E2A Music Group, LLC, Kobalt Music Group, AWAL, The Orchard, Sony Music Entertainment
- Formerly of: Second Alibi, Epic Factor
- Website: adammardel.com

Signature
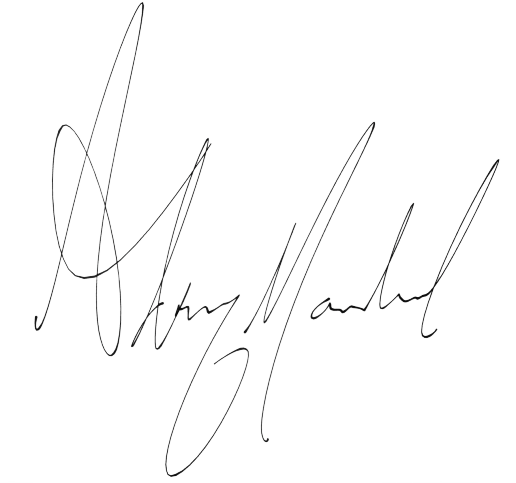

Adam Mardel is an American pop singer best known for his work with Second Alibi and for founding the record label E2A Music Group, LLC.

== Career ==
Adam was an opening act on Aaron Carter's After Party Tour in 2013. In the spring of 2017 Adam launched a concert series called "E2A Presents" to feature bands and artists of different genres. In a 2020 interview on WGN (AM) with Paul Lisnek Adam announced that he is working on a memoir and new music. Adam announced in a 2023 interview that he was re-releasing Second Alibi's records and was in the beginning stages of a charity compilation album.

== Personal life ==
On March 29, 2021, Adam announced via social media that he was engaged to Michael Liedke.

== Discography ==
=== Solo ===
==== Singles ====
- 2008: "One Reason"
- 2010: "Back Again (feat. MGC CHLD)"
- 2011: "Hypnotized (feat. The ResistantOne of Analog Resistance)"
- 2011: "As You Walk Away"
- 2012: "Freak Boy"

=== Second Alibi ===
==== Singles ====
- 2015: "Ignite"
- 2015: "Lost"
- 2016: "Red (Radio Edit)"
- 2016: "Waste of Time (Urban Mix)"
- 2016: "Back to You"
- 2017: "Soldier (feat. Lucas Bolander)"

==== Extended Plays ====
- 2016: "Ultimatum"

==== Studio albums ====
- 2017: "Ultimatum: The Ultimate Edition"
- 2023: "Ultimatum (International Version)"

== Concert Tours ==
=== Solo ===
==== Promotional ====
- 2011: Eleven Twelve Promo Tour
- 2012: Unbound Tour

==== Supporting ====
- 2011: Neon Pop Tour (w/ Adam Calvert of MTV's 'Taking the Stage')
- 2012: R.O.A.R. Tour (w/ Romance on a Rocketship)
- 2013: After Party Tour (w/ Aaron Carter)
- 2014: Wonderful World Tour (w/ Aaron Carter)

=== Second Alibi ===
==== Promotional ====
- 2014-2015: Ohio Boy Band Search Tour
- 2016: Hey UK! Tour

==== Supporting ====
- 2016: Social Jam Tour
- 2017: LØVË Tour (w/ Aaron Carter)

==== Co-headlining ====
- 2017: E2A Presents Tour

==== Headlining ====
- 2016: Ultimate Tour

== Filmography ==
=== Video Shorts ===
- 2017: "E2A Presents: Live at Gloria Theatre" – Himself
- 2018: "Making it Series: Meet the Team Behind E2A Music Group" – Himself

=== Specials ===
- 2012: "Adam Mardel: Talent Showcase"

== Miscellaneous Credits ==
Year	Release	Artist	Credit
2017	"Killing Blow"	Dystopian Echo	Management
2017	"Can You Feel It?"	The Avenue	Recording Supervisor, Management
2017	"Silver Lines & Paper Cuts"	Kady OBrien	A&R Representative, Recording Supervisor
2018	"High"	Kody Goens	A&R Representative, Mixing Assistant

== Awards ==
=== Ohio Music Awards ===
Year	Ceremony	Recipient	Category	Result
2015	Ohio Music Awards	Second Alibi	Best Electronica Song	Won

=== Pulse Music TV Awards ===
Year	Ceremony	Recipient	Category	Result
2016	Pulse Music TV Awards	Second Alibi	Chicago Spotlight	Won
