= Fandom (album) =

Studio album by Waterparks
- Released: October 11, 2019
- Genres: Pop; pop rock; pop-punk; electropop
- Length: 37:55
- Label: Hopeless
- Producer: Zakk Cervini

Waterparks chronology
| Entertainment (2018) | Fandom (2019) | Greatest Hits (2021) |

Singles from Fandom
- 1. "Turbulent" Released: May 23, 2019; 2. "Watch What Happens Next" Released: August 12, 2019; 3. "Dream Boy" Released: August 16, 2019; 4. "[Reboot]" Released: September 12, 2019; 5. "High Definition" Released: September 25, 2019; 6. "Easy to Hate" Released: October 17, 2019

Fandom (stylized in all caps) is the third studio album by the American pop rock band Waterparks, released on October 11, 2019. It is the band's only release through Hopeless Records and was produced by Zakk Cervini. The album debuted at number 32 on the Billboard 200 and number 52 in the UK, spawning six singles: "Turbulent", "Watch What Happens Next", "Dream Boy", "[Reboot]", "High Definition" and "Easy to Hate".

== Background ==
Fandom was originally going to be titled Friendly Reminder, but lead vocalist Awsten Knight decided to delete the files and start over. In speaking about why he deleted the album and started over, Knight stated:

“When I showed Geoff and Otto the songs, they were like ‘oh, cool’...And I was like, fuck! That’s the response?? It didn’t feel good. For them to not have any kind of response whatsoever? That’s not cool.”

== Themes and composition ==
Musically, Fandom has been described as pop, pop rock, pop punk, electropop, electronic, emo pop, and rock, with elements of hip hop, synth-pop, emo, emo rap, alternative pop, drum and bass, and acoustic rock. Lyrically, the album focuses on fan expectations and pressure. Talking about the album's themes, Wall of Sound stated, "[the album] goes through stages of having written about the fandom directly and the pressures of being looked up to and the issues that have been noticed...to being about a very hard breakup and mental health struggles that comes with everything in general, as well as the topics being spoken about."

== Release ==
On May 23, 2019, the band released their first single off of their upcoming album, "Turbulent" and announced that they got signed to Hopeless Records. On August 12, 2019, the band released the second single, "Watch What Happens Next" along with a music video and the announcement of the album to be released on October 11, 2019. On August 16, 2019, the band released their third single, "Dream Boy," along with a music video. On September 12, 2019, the fourth single, "[Reboot]" was released. On September 25, 2019, they released their fifth single for the album, "High Definition," along with a music video. On October 17, 2019, "Easy to Hate" was released as the sixth single, along with a music video.

== Artwork ==
The artwork for the album features a sliced orange in front of a dark green tiled ledge. It was conceptualized and drafted by Knight before being finalized by illustrator Amber Park.

== Reception ==
Professional ratings
Review scores
| Source | Rating |
|---|---|
| Dead Press | 8/10 stars |
| Discovered Magazine | 9.5/10 |
| Dork | 4/5 stars |
| Gig Goer | 4/5 stars |
| Highlight Magazine | 9.5/10 |
| Kerrang! | 4/5 |
| Rock Sound | positive |
| Upset | 4/5 stars |
| Wall of Sound | 7/10 |

Fandom received critical acclaim. In his review, Jack Rogers of Rock Sound called the album "one of the year's most fascinating, ferocious and fanatical albums". Jamie MacMillan of Dork gave the album four stars out of five, describing it as "edgy, exciting, and another nail in the coffin of boring genre restraints", calling it the band's best work to date. Jo Cosgrove of Discovered Magazine gave the album a rating of 9.5/10, stating that "Fandom is a very fun, very bouncy, party-perfect album. But to the right listeners, a fifteen-track confession on why fame and celebrity isn’t as fun as it looks. Or sounds."

In December 2019, Fandom made it to number 19 on Kerrang!'s 50 best albums of 2019, described as "a scintillating, attitude-packed skewering of fan culture and modern heartbreak" and "all held together under their own umbrella, marking Waterparks out as leaders in a field of one." In November 2019, Alternative Press listed FANDOM on an unranked list of their 50 best albums of 2019 in alternative, punk, alt-pop and beyond. Paige Owens described the album as "unapologetically honest as well as liberating" and that it "combines the greatest elements of pop, electronic and pop punk for a layered output that will offer listeners something new each time".

== Track listing ==
All lyrics are written by Awsten Knight; all music is composed by Waterparks.

Fandom
| No. | Title | Length |
|---|---|---|
| 1. | "Cherry Red" | 1:25 |
| 2. | "Watch What Happens Next" | 2:43 |
| 3. | "Dream Boy" | 2:47 |
| 4. | "Easy to Hate" | 3:11 |
| 5. | "High Definition" | 3:02 |
| 6. | "Telephone" | 2:33 |
| 7. | "Group Chat" | 0:14 |
| 8. | "Turbulent" | 2:42 |
| 9. | "Never Bloom Again" | 3:32 |
| 10. | "I Miss Having Sex But At Least I Don’t Wanna Die Anymore" | 2:13 |
| 11. | "War Crimes" | 3:08 |
| 12. | "[Reboot]" | 3:22 |
| 13. | "Worst" | 2:37 |
| 14. | "Zone Out" | 1:05 |
| 15. | "I Felt Younger When We Met" | 3:21 |
| Total length: | | 37:55 |

Target/HMV CD exclusive bonus tracks
| No. | Title | Length |
|---|---|---|
| 16. | "Dream Boy (Acoustic)" | 2:12 |
| 17. | "I Felt Younger When We Met (Demo)" | 3:02 |
| Total length: | | 43:19 |

== Personnel ==
Credits for Fandom

Waterparks

- Awsten Knight – lead vocals, guitar, bass, additional programming, artwork, layout
- Geoff Wigington – guitar, vocals
- Otto Wood – drums, vocals

Additional

- De'wayne Jackson – vocals
- Lucy Landry – vocals

Production

- Zakk Cervini – producer, engineer, mastering, mixing
- Amber Park – artwork, layout
- Jared Poythress – programming
- Nik Tretiakov – editing

== Charts ==
| Chart (2019) | Peak position |
|---|---|
| Scottish Albums (Official Charts) | 43 |
| UK Albums (Official Charts) | 52 |
| UK Independent Albums (Official Charts) | 11 |
| US Billboard 200 | 32 |
| US Top Alternative Albums (Billboard) | 2 |
| US Top Rock Albums (Billboard) | 5 |
