= Intellectual Property (album) =

Studio album by Waterparks
- Released: April 14, 2023
- Genres: Pop rock; hyperpop; electronica; alternative rock; pop-punk
- Length: 31:00
- Label: Fueled by Ramen
- Producers: Awsten Knight; Zakk Cervini; Julian Bunetta

Waterparks chronology
Greatest Hits (2021)	Intellectual Property (2023)	Jinx (2026)

Singles from Intellectual Property
- 1. "Funeral Grey" Released: May 13, 2022; 2. "Self-Sabotage" Released: July 7, 2022; 3. "Fuck About It" Released: October 14, 2022; 4. "Real Super Dark" Released: January 26, 2023; 5. "Brainwashed" Released: March 10, 2023

Intellectual Property (stylized in all caps) is the fifth studio album by the American pop rock band Waterparks, released on April 14, 2023, as the band's only album released on Fueled by Ramen.

== Release ==
On January 27, 2022, the band began teasing material from their fifth studio album. On April 7, 2022, the first single, "Funeral Grey" was announced, and was then subsequently released on May 13 as their first release under Fueled by Ramen. On July 5, 2022, the band announced the second single, "Self-Sabotage" to be released on July 7. The band also released a teaser of a new song titled "Brainwashed" that the band has been performing on tour. On August 8, 2022, the band released a music video for "Self-Sabotage". On August 30, 2022, the band debuted a new song live titled "Real Super Dark" from the upcoming album. On October 14, 2022, the band released the single "Fuck About It", featuring Blackbear. On November 23, 2022, the band announced the title of their fifth studio album, Intellectual Property. On December 1, 2022, the band released a music video for "Fuck About It". On January 26, 2023, the band released the album's fourth single, "Real Super Dark". The band also confirmed the release date for the album to be April 14, 2023. On March 10, 2023, the band released the album's fifth single, "Brainwashed".

On October 11, 2023, the band released "Sneaking Out of Heaven" and added the song to all streaming versions of the album's standard edition.

== Composition ==
Intellectual Property has been described as pop rock, hyperpop, electronica, alternative rock, and pop punk, with "hip hop production."

== Reception ==
Professional ratings
Review scores
Source	Rating
Kerrang!	4/5
New Noise	4.5/5 stars
Square One Magazine	5/5 stars
Upset Magazine	5/5 stars

Intellectual Property received positive reviews. Emily Carter of Kerrang! called the album "another compelling addition to a discography that always succeeds in bringing something fresh to the table." Ashley Oken of New Noise Magazine feels that the album "perfectly melts their eras together...[and] sees Waterparks take a bold step into new territory." Stephen Ackroyd of Upset Magazine called the album "A constantly shifting, hyperactive genre flip, [that] bounces off the walls of the tired and overdone – the best sonic representation of Awsten Knight's chaotic mischief yet." Emily Young of Square One Magazine shared that the album is "quintessential Waterparks - a detailed journey from start to finish."

In December 2023, Rock Sound listed Intellectual Property at number seven in its Top 50 Albums of 2023, describing it as a "stripped-back" songwriting effort compared to "the diverse and dynamic ideas of 'Greatest Hits'" and having Awsten Knight's "poppiest melodies to date". Kerrang! listed Intellectual Property in its own 50 best albums of 2023 list at number 47, with Jake Richardson describing it as "another strong record from one of pop-punk's most creative forces."

== Track listing ==
All lyrics are written by Awsten Knight; all music is composed by Waterparks.

Intellectual Property track listing
No.	Title	Writer(s)	Length
1.	"St*rfucker"	Awsten Knight	1:52
2.	"Real Super Dark"	Knight; Joe Ragosta	2:29
3.	"Funeral Grey"	Knight; Julian Bunetta	2:44
4.	"Brainwashed"	Knight; Bunetta	2:44
5.	"2 Best Friends"	Knight; Zakk Cervini; Bunetta	2:18
6.	"End of the Water (Feel)"	Knight; Bunetta; Ragosta	2:27
7.	"Self-Sabotage"	Knight; Cervini; Andrew Goldstein	2:37
8.	"Ritual"	Knight; Cervini; Goldstein	2:44
9.	"Fuck About It" (featuring Blackbear)	Knight; Cervini; Bunetta; Blackbear	2:52
10.	"Closer"	Knight	3:51
11.	"A Night Out on Earth"	Knight; Cervini	4:22
Total length:			31:00

Streaming Deluxe
No.	Title	Length
12.	"Sneaking Out of Heaven"	2:40
Total length:		33:40

Target CD exclusive bonus tracks
No.	Title	Writer(s)	Length
12.	"Why Can't I?" (Liz Phair cover)	Lauren Christy; Scott Spock; Graham Edwards; Liz Phair	3:16
13.	"End of the Water" (alt version)	Knight; Bunetta; Ragosta	2:15
Total length:			36:30

Notes

- All tracks are stylized in all caps.

== Personnel ==
Waterparks

- Awsten Knight – lead vocals, guitar, bass, production, additional programming
- Geoff Wigington – guitar
- Otto Wood – drums

Additional musicians

- Lucy Landry – additional vocals (tracks 3, 4)
- Kurtis Conner – additional vocals (6)
- Vincente Void – additional vocals (8)
- Blackbear – additional vocals (9)

Production

- Zakk Cervini – production, engineering, mastering, mixing
- Julian Bunetta – co-production (4, 5, 9)
- Nik Trekov – mixing assistance, engineering assistance
- Jared Poythress – additional programming, additional production
- Chris Gehringer – mastering

== Charts ==
Chart performance for Intellectual Property
Chart (2023)	Peak position
Australian Vinyl Albums (ARIA)	18
Scottish Albums (Official Charts)	2
UK Albums (Official Charts)	10
US Billboard 200	33
US Tastemaker Albums (Billboard)	6
US Top Album Sales (Billboard)	2
US Top Alternative Albums (Billboard)	4
US Top Current Album Sales (Billboard)	2
US Top Rock Albums (Billboard)	6
US Top Rock & Alternative Albums (Billboard)	9
US Vinyl Albums (Billboard)	3
