= Juanita's =

Restaurant in Little Rock, Arkansas

Coordinates: 34.74745°N 92.26359°W

Juanita's Cafe and Bar (often just Juanita's) was a well-known venue and restaurant in Little Rock, Arkansas.

Juanita's closed Dec 20, 2015.

== Notable performers ==
Acts who have performed live there have include:

- Andy McKee
- Avenged Sevenfold
- Black Stone Cherry
- Buckcherry
- Buckethead
- Chupacabra
- Envy On The Coast
- Eric Johnson
- Evanescence
- Fear Factory
- Forgive Durden
- Hana Pestle
- Hellyeah
- Machina (band)
- Mushroomhead
- OK Go
- Powerman 5000
- Saosin
- Socialburn
- Sparta
- The Outline
- Todd Snider
- VAST
- We Are The Fallen
- Your Enemies Friends
- Zakk Wylde
