= Greatest Hits (Waterparks album) =

Studio album by Waterparks
- Released: May 21, 2021
- Recorded: 2020
- Studio: Los Angeles
- Genres: Pop rock; hyperpop; pop; alternative rock; pop-punk; hip hop
- Length: 47:01
- Label: 300
- Producers: Zakk Cervini; Awsten Knight

Waterparks chronology
Fandom (2019)	Greatest Hits (2021)	Intellectual Property (2023)

Singles from Greatest Hits
- 1. "Lowkey as Hell" Released: September 25, 2020; 2. "Snow Globe" Released: February 26, 2021; 3. "Numb" Released: March 29, 2021; 4. "You'd Be Paranoid Too (If Everyone Was Out to Get You)" Released: April 28, 2021; 5. "Just Kidding" Released: May 12, 2021; 6. "Violet!" Released: May 18, 2021

Greatest Hits is the fourth studio album by the American pop rock band Waterparks. It is the band's only album with the label 300 Entertainment and was released on May 21, 2021.

== Release ==
The album's lead single, "Lowkey as Hell", was released on September 25, 2020, with the simultaneous announcement of their label transition. The second single, "Snow Globe", debuted on February 26, 2021. A few weeks later, the band posted a cryptic URL which allowed users to unscramble the word "NUMB," and would receive a musical snippet upon doing so. The third single of the same name was released on March 29. The website trend would continue, this time featuring a peephole with a forwards counter above it. The fourth single, "You'd Be Paranoid Too (If Everyone Was Out To Get You)", was released on April 28, 2021, sharing its title with an autobiography written by vocalist and rhythm guitarist Awsten Knight. The fifth single, "Just Kidding", was released on May 12, 2021. The sixth single, "Violet!", was released May 18, 2021. A music video was released for the song on May 26, 2021.

Despite heavy involvement with the production of previous releases, Greatest Hits is the first Waterparks album for which Knight is explicitly credited as a producer. The album's cover art was shot by British photographer Phil Knott.

== Composition ==
Greatest Hits has been mainly described as pop punk, hyperpop, pop, rap, pop rock, alternative rock, and contains elements of drum and bass, industrial, grunge, orchestral, emo rap, stadium rock, and lo-fi.

== Reception ==
Professional ratings
Aggregate scores
Source	Rating
Metacritic	82/100
Review scores
Source	Rating
AllMusic	4/5 stars
Dead Press!	10/10 stars
DIY	3.5/5 stars
Dork	5/5 stars
Kerrang!	4/5
NME	4/5 stars
Upset	5/5 stars
Wall of Sound	8/10

Greatest Hits received critical acclaim. At Metacritic, which assigns a normalized rating out of 100 to reviews from mainstream critics, the album has an average score of 82 out of 100 based on 4 reviews, indicating "critical acclaim". Matt Collar of AllMusic was positive and considered to songs on Greatest Hits to be "stadium-sized singalong anthems". Stevie Blackburn of Dead Press! praised the album and stated that "[the album's] seventeen tracks completely deliver...[and] with the talent that Waterparks possess they have an extremely long and bright career ahead of them." Sarah Jamieson of DIY praised the band's experimentation with various genres stating that it "make[s] Greatest Hits feel like a whirlwind of genres that far exceed the "pop rock" label that's been placed on them." Writing for Dork, Jamie MacMillan called the album "great" and stated that the album was "full of hits". Emily Carter of Kerrang! praised the songwriting on the album stating, "Waterparks have genuinely done everything; not so much simply just opening the metaphorical artistic door to give listeners a peek at their sky-high songwriting aspirations, but truly throwing all they have into 17 songs of pure chaotic – but carefully-crafted, don’t forget that – brilliance."

Ali Shutler of NME called the album a "bold step into sprawling new territory". Writing for Upset, Stephen Ackroyd described the album's sound by stating, "never anything but in your face, it switches from pop-punk to full-on hyper-pop banger at will." Wall of Sound praised the album and considered the album to have a "different vibe to it" than their 2019 album, Fandom.

In December 2021, Kerrang! listed Greatest Hits at number 31 on its 50 best albums of 2021 list. Emily Carter described the album as "wildly experimental" and Awsten Knight's work on it as having "emphatically succeeded in being the polar opposite of dull".

== Track listing ==
All lyrics are written by Awsten Knight; all music is composed by Waterparks.

Greatest Hits
No.	Title	Writer(s)	Length
1.	"Greatest Hits"	Awsten Knight	1:34
2.	"Fuzzy"	Knight; Zakk Cervini	3:26
3.	"Lowkey as Hell"	Knight; Cervini; Andrew Goldstein	2:16
4.	"Numb"	Knight; Cervini	2:26
5.	"Violet!"	Knight	2:47
6.	"Snow Globe"	Knight	3:51
7.	"Just Kidding"	Knight; Cervini	2:29
8.	"The Secret Life of Me"	Knight; Cervini	3:25
9.	"American Graffiti"	Knight	2:48
10.	"You'd Be Paranoid Too (If Everyone Was Out to Get You)"	Knight; Joe Ragosta; Cervini	2:31
11.	"Fruit Roll Ups"	Knight; Cervini	3:44
12.	"Like It"	Knight	2:23
13.	"Gladiator (Interlude)"	Knight; Jared Poythress; Josh Madden	1:13
14.	"Magnetic"	Knight; Cervini	2:52
15.	"Crying Over It All"	Knight; Cervini	3:15
16.	"Ice Bath"	Knight	2:29
17.	"See You in in the Future"	Knight; Ragosta; Cervini	3:32
Total length:			47:01

Notes

- "See You in in the Future" was originally titled without the duplicate "in". It was changed in early November 2021 in response to a misspelt fan tattoo.
- "Like It" is stylised in all caps.

== Personnel ==
Credits adapted from Tidal.

Waterparks

- Awsten Knight – lead vocals, guitar, bass, additional programming, artwork, layout, percussion (track 3), keyboards (track 3)
- Geoff Wigington – guitar, vocals
- Otto Wood – drums, vocals

Additional musicians

- Zakk Cervini – keyboards (track 3)
- Jared Poythress – keyboards (track 3)
- Lucy Landry – vocal (track 4)
- Andrew Goldstein – piano (track 3)
- Mikey Way – bass (track 10)
- Chris Carrabba – vocals (track 10)
- De'Wayne – vocals (track 10)
- Dallon Weekes – vocals (track 11)
- Zeph – vocals (track 15)

Production

- Awsten Knight – production
- Zakk Cervini – production, engineering, mastering, mixing
- Jared Poythress – additional production (tracks 5, 7, and 13)
- Chris Gehringer – mastering
- Jeff Fenster – A&R direction

== Charts ==
Chart performance for Greatest Hits
Chart (2021)	Peak position
Scottish Albums (Official Charts)	12
UK Albums (Official Charts)	37
UK Independent Albums (Official Charts)	7
US Billboard 200	42
US Top Alternative Albums (Billboard)	5
US Top Rock Albums (Billboard)	6
