= Sidequest (album) =

Studio album by Michael Clifford
- Released: 25 July 2025
- Genre: Electronic; pop-punk
- Length: 27:14
- Label: Hopeless
- Producer: Michael Clifford; JT Daly; John Feldmann; Andrew Goldstein; Ryan Hall; Matt Koma; Oscar Neidhardt; Porter Robinson; Rudey

Singles from Sidequest
- 1. "Cool" Released: 4 April 2025; 2. "Give Me a Break!" Released: 23 May 2025; 3. "Kill Me for Always" Released: 27 June 2025; 4. "Enough" Released: 25 July 2025

Sidequest is the debut solo studio album by Australian musician Michael Clifford. It was announced on 23 May 2025 and released on 25 July that year. The album features guest appearances from Porter Robinson, Waterparks, and Ryan Hall.

== Singles ==
The album's lead single, "Cool", was premiered on 2 April released via on 4 April 2025. Rolling Stone described the song as "reflective".

"Give Me a Break" was released on 23 May 2025 alongside the album's announcement. Melodic Mag said "The track explores the feelings of impostor syndrome, burnout, and fear of judgment that come with being in the spotlight."

"Kill Me for Always", was released on 27 June 2025 as the album's third single. Clifford said "As the first track off my upcoming album, I think it perfectly sets the tone of the beginning of a story."

"Enough" was released alongside the album on 25 July 2025 as the album's fourth single.

== Reception ==
Rachael S Hunt from SF Gate said "Ten energetic, introspective tracks form a tight album that explores self-doubt, fame and romance. The songs are pop-punk in spirit but deviate from the formula with a stadium-sized production: experimental electronics, big synths and versatile vocals."

Mary Varvaris from The Music said "When listening to Sidequest, it's clear that Clifford embraces a genre-free, eclectic style that you don't hear all that often, while still feeling uniquely him, and like it can appeal to Gen Z. He draws from influences as diverse as Biggie and My Chemical Romance, and as a result, the album defies categorisation. The chameleonic effort is packed with surprises: 'Cool' is pure pop-punk vibes, 'Thirsty' is an acoustic-led ballad, 'Eclipse' goes hyperpop, and he rap-sings on 'Give Me a Break'".

Vivian Richey from Melodic Mag said "Sidequest blends pop-punk energy with honest and personal storytelling, offering a clear sense of who Clifford is both as an artist and a person. It's a project built on honesty, memory, and melody—and for a debut solo album, it successfully lands exactly where it should."

== Track listing ==
Sidequest track listing
No.	Title	Writer(s)	Producer(s)	Length
1.	"Kill Me for Always" (featuring Porter Robinson)	Michael Clifford; Oscar Neidhardt; Noah Luke Nockels; Porter Robinson	Clifford; JT Daly; Neidhardt; Robinson; Rudey	3:07
2.	"Cool"	Clifford; Andrew Goldstein; Calum Hood; Marcus Lomax; Elijah Noll	Clifford; Daly; Goldstein	2:43
3.	"Give Me a Break!" (featuring Waterparks)	Clifford; Daly; Mikky Ekko; Awsten Knight; Adrian Lyles; Nockels; Stefan Pajaro-van de Stadt; Zeph Park; Cedric de Saint-Rome	Clifford; Daly	2:33
4.	"Remember When"	Clifford; Nick Bailey; Daly; Matthew Hansen; Sean Van Vleet	Daly	2:43
5.	"Enough"	Clifford; John Feldmann; Nockels; Simon Wilcox	Clifford; Daly; Feldmann	2:58
6.	"Fashion"	Clifford; Carol Ades; Matthew Koma	Clifford; Daly; Koma	2:40
7.	"Thirsty"	Clifford; Braden Bales; Katie Cecil; Zachary Stein	Clifford; Daly; Ryan Hall	2:37
8.	"Nosebleed"	Clifford; Koma; Madison Love	Clifford; Daly; Koma	3:18
9.	"If I Had a Choice" (featuring Ryan Hall)	Clifford; Nockels; Cesar Peralta	Clifford; Daly; Hall	2:41
10.	"Eclipse"	Clifford; Feldmann; Sierra Hemmings	Clifford; Daly; Feldmann	1:51
Total length:				27:14

=== Note ===
- All track titles are stylised in lowercase.

== Personnel ==
Credits adapted from Tidal.

- Michael Clifford – lead vocals
- Adam Hawkins – mixing
- Joe LaPorta – mastering

== Charts ==
Chart performance for Sidequest
Chart (2025)	Peak position
Australian Albums (ARIA)	10
Scottish Albums (OCC)	33
UK Albums Sales (OCC)	28
UK Independent Albums (OCC)	15
US Top Album Sales (Billboard)	15
