= Charlie Puth discography =

- Charlie Puth performing at Poble Espanyol in 2026
- Studio albums: 4
- EPs: 4
- Singles: 29
- Video albums: 1
- Music videos: 34
- Promotional singles: 8

American singer-songwriter Charlie Puth has released four studio albums, four extended plays, one video album, twenty-nine singles, eight promotional singles, and thirty-four music videos. Puth released two extended plays, The Otto Tunes (2010) and Ego (2013), as an independent artist. In 2015 he signed with Atlantic Records and released his debut single "Marvin Gaye", which features guest vocals from Meghan Trainor. The single has been certified 2× Platinum in Australia, topped the charts in New Zealand, Ireland, and the United Kingdom. Puth wrote, co-produced, and was featured on a song by Wiz Khalifa, "See You Again", included in the Furious 7 soundtrack. On May 1, 2015, Puth released an EP, Some Type of Love. The pre-order for Puth's debut studio album Nine Track Mind started on August 20, 2015, along with the second single "One Call Away". The album was officially released on January 29, 2016. Puth released his second studio album Voicenotes on May 11, 2018, supported by the singles "Attention", "How Long", "Done for Me", "Change", and "The Way I Am". His third album, Charlie, was released on October 7, 2022, which includes singles "Light Switch" and "Left and Right", with BTS member Jungkook.

== Albums ==
=== Studio albums ===
List of studio albums, with selected chart positions and certifications
Title	Details	Peak chart positions										Certifications
Title	Details	US	AUS	BEL (FL)	CAN	DEN	FRA	ITA	NZ	SWE	UK	Certifications
Nine Track Mind	Released: January 29, 2016; Label: Atlantic; Formats: CD, LP, digital download, streaming	6	8	17	5	6	5	21	2	24	6	RIAA: 2× Platinum; BPI: Platinum; MC: 2× Platinum; FIMI: Gold; GLF: Gold; IFPI DEN: 2× Platinum; RMNZ: 3× Platinum; SNEP: Platinum
Voicenotes	Released: May 11, 2018; Label: Atlantic; Formats: CD, LP, digital download, streaming	4	7	19	5	14	3	12	6	18	4	RIAA: Platinum; BPI: Gold; MC: 4× Platinum; RMNZ: Platinum; SNEP: Gold
Charlie	Released: October 7, 2022; Label: Atlantic; Formats: CD, LP, digital download, streaming	10	5	52	7	—	77	—	6	—	9	MC: Gold; RMNZ: Gold
Whatever's Clever!	Released: March 27, 2026; Label: Atlantic; Formats: CD, LP, digital download, streaming	46	33	133	—	—	—	—	33	—	— (Note: Whatever's Clever! did not enter the UK Albums Chart, but peaked at number 25 on the UK Albums Sales Chart.)	
"—" denotes releases that did not chart or were not released in that territory.

=== Video albums ===
List of video albums
Title	Album details
Apple Music Festival: London 2015	Released: October 15, 2015; Label: ARP; Format: Digital download

== Extended plays ==
List of extended plays, with selected chart positions
Title	Details	Peak chart positions		
Title	Details	US	US Heat	DEN
The Otto Tunes	Released: December 10, 2010; Label: Independent; Format: Digital download, streaming	—	—	—
Ego	Released: October 23, 2013; Label: Independent; Format: Digital download, streaming	—	—	—
Some Type of Love	Released: May 1, 2015; Label: ARP, Atlantic; Format: Digital download, streaming	37	3	40
Spotify Singles	Released: August 23, 2017; Label: ARP, Atlantic; Format: Streaming	—	—	—
"—" denotes releases that did not chart or were not released in that territory.

== Singles ==
=== As lead artist ===
List of singles as lead artist, with selected chart positions and certifications, showing year released and album name
Title	Year	Peak chart position										Certifications	Album
Title	Year	US	AUS	BEL (FL)	CAN	DEN	FRA	ITA	NZ	SWE	UK	Certifications	Album
"Marvin Gaye" (featuring Meghan Trainor)	2015	21	4	4	31	28	1	6	1	29	1	RIAA: 4× Platinum; ARIA: 4× Platinum; BEA: Gold; BPI: 2× Platinum; FIMI: 3× Platinum; GLF: 2× Platinum; IFPI DEN: Platinum; MC: 3× Platinum; RMNZ: 3× Platinum	Nine Track Mind
"One Call Away"	2015	12	3	12	15	13	36	39	3	21	26	RIAA: 4× Platinum; ARIA: 7× Platinum; BEA: Gold; BPI: Platinum; FIMI: Platinum; GLF: 2× Platinum; IFPI DEN: 2× Platinum; MC: 4× Platinum; RMNZ: 4× Platinum	Nine Track Mind
"We Don't Talk Anymore" (featuring Selena Gomez)	2016	9	10	18	11	13	8	1	8	13	14	RIAA: 5× Platinum; ARIA: 6× Platinum; BEA: Platinum; BPI: 2× Platinum; FIMI: 5× Platinum; IFPI DEN: 2× Platinum; MC: Diamond; RMNZ: 5× Platinum; SNEP: Diamond	Nine Track Mind
"Dangerously"	2016	—	—	—	—	—	169	—	— (Note: "Dangerously" did not enter the NZ Top 40 Singles Chart, but peaked at number 10 on the NZ Heatzeekers Singles Chart.)	—	—	RIAA: Gold; BPI: Silver; RMNZ: Platinum	Nine Track Mind
"Attention"	2017	5	10	15	6	12	5	10	6	20	9	RIAA: 6× Platinum; ARIA: 7× Platinum; BEA: Platinum; BPI: 3× Platinum; FIMI: 4× Platinum; IFPI DEN: 2× Platinum; MC: Diamond; RMNZ: 4× Platinum; SNEP: Diamond	Voicenotes
"How Long"	2017	21	17	10	24	17	54	39	17	44	9	RIAA: 3× Platinum; ARIA: 3× Platinum; BEA: Gold; BPI: Platinum; FIMI: Platinum; IFPI DEN: Platinum; MC: 2× Platinum; RMNZ: 2× Platinum; SNEP: Platinum	Voicenotes
"Done for Me" (featuring Kehlani)	2018	53	97	— (Note: "Done for Me" did not enter the Ultratop 50, but peaked at number 2 on the Flemish Ultratip chart.)	65	—	97	87	— (Note: "Done for Me" did not enter the NZ Top 40 Singles Chart, but peaked at number 6 on the NZ Heatseeker Singles Chart.)	— (Note: "Done for Me" did not enter the Swedish Singellista chart, but peaked at number 5 on the Swedish Heatseeker chart.)	45	RIAA: Platinum; ARIA: Platinum; BPI: Silver; FIMI: Gold; MC: Gold; RMNZ: Gold	Voicenotes
"Change" (featuring James Taylor)	2018	—	—	—	—	—	—	—	—	— (Note: "Change" did not enter the Swedish Singellista chart, but peaked at number 14 on the Swedish Heatseeker chart.)	—		Voicenotes
"The Way I Am"	2018	61	—	— (Note: "The Way I Am" did not enter the Ultratop 50, but peaked at number 14 on the Flemish Ultratip chart.)	—	—	—	—	—	—	—	RIAA: Platinum; ARIA: Gold	Voicenotes
"Easier (Remix)" (with 5 Seconds of Summer)	2019	—	—	—	—	—	—	—	— (Note: "Easier (Remix)" did not enter the NZ Top 40 Singles Chart, but peaked at number 13 on the NZ Hot Singles Chart.)	—	—		Non-album singles
"I Warned Myself"	2019	—	—	—	91	—	—	—	— (Note: "I Warned Myself" did not enter the NZ Top 40 Singles Chart, but peaked at number 18 on the NZ Hot Singles Chart.)	—	—		Non-album singles
"Mother"	2019	—	—	—	—	—	—	—	— (Note: "Mother" did not enter the NZ Top 40 Singles Chart, but peaked at number 26 on the NZ Hot Singles Chart.)	—	—		Non-album singles
"Cheating on You"	2019	—	—	—	—	—	—	—	— (Note: "Cheating on You" did not enter the NZ Top 40 Singles Chart, but peaked at number 23 on the NZ Hot Singles Chart.)	—	—		Non-album singles
"Girlfriend"	2020	—	—	—	—	—	—	—	— (Note: "Girlfriend" did not enter the NZ Top 40 Singles Chart, but peaked at number 24 on the NZ Hot Singles Chart.)	—	—		Non-album singles
"Hard on Yourself" (with Blackbear)	2020	—	—	—	—	—	—	—	— (Note: "Hard on Yourself" did not enter the NZ Top 40 Singles Chart, but peaked at number 25 on the NZ Hot Singles Chart.)	—	—		Non-album singles
"Free"	2020	—	—	—	—	—	—	—	—	—	—		The One and Only Ivan
"After All" (with Elton John)	2021	—	—	—	—	—	—	—	— (Note: "After All" did not enter the NZ Top 40 Singles Chart, but peaked at number 19 on the NZ Hot Singles Chart.)	—	—		The Lockdown Sessions
"Light Switch"	2022	27	20	47	17	20	—	—	28	36	25	RIAA: Platinum; ARIA: 2× Platinum; MC: 3× Platinum; BPI: Gold; IFPI DEN: Gold; RMNZ: Platinum	Charlie
"That's Hilarious"	2022	— (Note: "That's Hilarious" did not enter the Billboard Hot 100, but peaked at number 9 on the Bubbling Under Hot 100 Singles chart.)	—	—	80	—	—	—	— (Note: "That's Hilarious" did not enter the NZ Top 40 Singles Chart, but peaked at number 2 on the NZ Hot Singles Chart.)	— (Note: "That's Hilarious" did not enter the Swedish Singellista Chart, but peaked at number 9 on the Swedish Heatseeker Chart.)	100		Charlie
"Left and Right" (with Jungkook)	2022	22	19	41	17	—	150	—	15	— (Note: "Left and Right" did not enter the Swedish Singellista Chart, but peaked at number 19 on the Swedish Heatseeker Chart.)	41	RIAA: Gold; ARIA: Platinum; BPI: Silver; MC: 2× Platinum; RMNZ: Platinum	Charlie
"Smells Like Me"	2022	—	—	—	—	—	—	—	— (Note: "Smells Like Me" did not enter the NZ Top 40 Singles Chart, but peaked at number 14 on the NZ Hot Singles Chart.)	—	—		Charlie
"I Don't Think That I Like Her"	2022	—	—	—	—	—	—	—	— (Note: "I Don't Think That I Like Her" did not enter the NZ Top 40 Singles Chart, but peaked at number 16 on the NZ Hot Singles Chart.)	—	—		Charlie
"Charlie Be Quiet!"	2022	—	—	—	—	—	—	—	— (Note: "Charlie Be Quiet!" did not enter the NZ Top 40 Singles Chart, but peaked at number 11 on the NZ Hot Singles Chart.)	—	—		Charlie
"That's Not How This Works" (featuring Dan + Shay or Sabrina's version featuring Sabrina Carpenter)	2023	— (Note: "That's Not How This Works" did not enter the Billboard Hot 100, but peaked at number 20 on the Bubbling Under Hot 100 Singles chart.)	—	—	—	—	—	—	— (Note: "That's Not How This Works" did not enter the NZ Top 40 Singles Chart, but peaked at number 4 on the NZ Hot Singles Chart.)	—	—		Non-album singles
"Lipstick"	2023	—	—	—	—	—	—	—	— (Note: "Lipstick" did not enter the NZ Top 40 Singles Chart, but peaked at number 22 on the NZ Hot Singles Chart.)	—	—		Non-album singles
"Hero"	2024	—	—	—	—	—	—	—	— (Note: "Hero" did not enter the NZ Top 40 Singles Chart, but peaked at number 33 on the NZ Hot Singles Chart.)	—	—		Non-album singles
"December 25th"	2024	—	—	—	—	—	—	—	—	—	—		Non-album singles
"Changes"	2025	—	—	—	—	—	—	—	— (Note: "Changes" did not enter the NZ Top 40 Singles Chart, but peaked at number 15 on the NZ Hot Singles Chart.)	—	—		Whatever's Clever!
"Beat Yourself Up"	2026	—	—	—	—	—	—	—	— (Note: "Beat Yourself Up" did not enter the NZ Top 40 Singles Chart, but peaked at number 18 on the NZ Hot Singles Chart.)	—	—		Whatever's Clever!
"Home" (featuring Hikaru Utada)	2026	—	—	—	—	—	—	—	— (Note: "Home" did not enter the NZ Top 40 Singles Chart, but peaked at number 32 on the NZ Hot Singles Chart.)	—	—		Whatever's Clever!
"Sideways" (featuring Coco Jones)	2026	—	—	—	—	—	—	—	— (Note: "Sideways" did not enter the NZ Top 40 Singles Chart, but peaked at number 21 on the NZ Hot Singles Chart.)	—	—		Whatever's Clever!
"—" denotes releases that did not chart or were not released in that territory.

=== As featured artist ===
List of singles as featured artist, with selected chart positions and certifications, showing year released and album name
Title	Year	Peak chart positions										Certifications	Album
Title	Year	US	AUS	CAN	DEN	GER	ITA	NZ	SWE	SWI	UK	Certifications	Album
"See You Again" (Wiz Khalifa featuring Charlie Puth)	2015	1	1	1	1	1	1	1	1	1	1	RIAA: 14× Platinum; ARIA: 7× Platinum; BPI: 4× Platinum; BVMI: Diamond; FIMI: 5× Platinum; GLF: 3× Platinum; IFPI DEN: 3× Platinum; IFPI SWI: 2× Platinum; MC: Diamond; RMNZ: 5× Platinum	Furious 7
"Sober" (G-Eazy featuring Charlie Puth)	2017	— (Note: "Sober" did not enter the Billboard Hot 100, but peaked at number 6 on the Bubbling Under Hot 100 Singles chart.)	—	80	—	—	—	— (Note: "Sober" did not enter the NZ Top 40 Singles Chart, but peaked at number 4 on the NZ Heatseekers Singles Chart.)	—	—	—	RIAA: Gold; MC: Gold	The Beautiful & Damned
"I Hope (Remix)" (Gabby Barrett featuring Charlie Puth)	2020	3	—	—	—	—	—	—	—	—	84	BPI: Silver	Goldmine
"Summer Feelings" (Lennon Stella featuring Charlie Puth)	2020	—	—	96	—	—	—	—	—	—	79	RIAA: Gold; MC: Gold; RMNZ: Gold	Scoob! The Album
"Upside Down" (Jvke featuring Charlie Puth)	2020	—	—	—	—	—	—	—	—	—	—		Non-album single
"Is It Just Me?" (Sasha Sloan featuring Charlie Puth)	2020	—	—	—	—	—	—	—	—	—	—		Only Child
"Obsessed" (Calvin Harris featuring Charlie Puth and Shenseea)	2022	—	—	—	76	—	—	—	—	—	71		Funk Wav Bounces Vol. 2
"Angel Pt. 2" (Jvke featuring Jimin, Charlie Puth and Muni Long)	2023	—	—	—	—	—	—	— (Note: "Angel Pt. 2" did not enter the NZ Top 40 Singles Chart, but peaked at number 23 on the NZ Hot Singles Chart.)	—	—	—		Non-album single
"Lose My Breath" (Stray Kids featuring Charlie Puth)	2024	90	—	— (Note: "Lose My Breath" did not enter the Canadian Hot 100, but peaked at number 42 on the Canadian Digital Song Sales.)	—	—	—	— (Note: "Lose My Breath" did not enter the NZ Top 40 Singles Chart, but peaked at number 13 on the NZ Hot Singles Chart.)	—	—	97		Non-album single
"—" denotes releases that did not chart or were not released in that territory.

=== Promotional singles ===
List of promotional singles with selected chart positions, showing year released and album name
Title	Year	Peak chart positions				Album
Title	Year	US	US Rhy.	NZ Hot	SWE Heat.	Album
"Break Again" (with Emily Luther)	2011	—	—	—	—	Non-album promotional singles
"L.U.V."	2014	—	—	—	—	Non-album promotional singles
"Nothing but Trouble" (with Lil Wayne)	2015	86	7	—	—	808: The Music
"I Won't Tell a Soul"	2015	—	—	—	—	Some Type of Love
"Suffer" (Vince Staples & AndreaLo Remix)	2016	—	—	—	—	Nine Track Mind
"Santa Claus Is Coming to Town" (DNCE featuring Charlie Puth, Hailee Steinfeld, Daya, Fifth Harmony, Rita Ora, Tinashe, Sabrina Carpenter and Jake Miller)	2016	—	—	—	—	Non-album promotional single
"If You Leave Me Now" (featuring Boyz II Men)	2018	—	—	— (Note: "If You Leave Me Now" did not enter the NZ Top 40 or Hot Singles Chart, but peaked at number 10 on the NZ Heatseeker Singles Chart.)	13	Voicenotes
"Life's Good" (featuring Stacey Ryan, Sade Whittier, Dani Kim and Stacy Capers)	2021	—	—	—	—	Non-album promotional single
"Cry" (featuring Kenny G)	2026	—	—	— (Note: "Cry" did not enter the NZ Top 40 Singles Chart, but peaked at number 38 on the NZ Hot Singles Chart.)	—	Whatever's Clever
"The Star Spangled Banner" (Live)	2026	—	—	—	—	Super Bowl LX Live from Santa Clara, CA
"—" denotes releases that did not chart or were not released in that territory.

== Other charted songs ==
List of songs, with selected chart positions and certifications, showing year released and album name
Title	Year	Peak chart positions									Certifications	Album
Title	Year	US Bub.	CRO	IRE	JPN Over.	LBN	NZ Heat.	NZ Hot	SWE Heat.	UK	Certifications	Album
"Oops" (Little Mix featuring Charlie Puth)	2016	—	—	49	—	—	—	—	—	41	BPI: Gold	Glory Days
"Patient"	2018	—	—	—	—	—	10	—	10	—		Voicenotes
"Loser"	2022	21	60	—	—	18	—	13	—	— (Note: "Loser" did not enter the UK Singles Chart, but peaked at number 39 on the UK Singles Downloads Chart.)		Charlie
"Love in Exile" (featuring Michael McDonald and Kenny Loggins)	2026	—	—	—	19	—	—	—	—	—		Whatever's Clever!
"—" denotes releases that did not chart or were not released in that territory.

== Guest appearances ==
List of other appearances, showing year released, other artist(s) credited and album name
Title	Year	Other artist(s)	Album
"How Deep Is Your Love"	2015	—N/a	BBC Radio 1's Live Lounge
"Through the Fire"	2016	—N/a	BBC Radio 2's Sounds of the 80s, Vol. 2

== Production discography ==
List of songs co-written and co-produced by Puth for other artists.
Title	Year	Artist	Album	Credits
"Celebrate"	2014	Pitbull	Globalization	Co-writer
"California Winter"	2014	Bonnie McKee	Non-album singles	Co-writer
"How Long"	2014	Skizzy Mars	Non-album singles	Co-producer, co-writer
"Would You Mind"	2014	Livingston Taylor	Blue Sky	Co-producer
"Pick Yourself Up"	2014	Livingston Taylor	Blue Sky	Co-producer
"Blue Sky"	2014	Livingston Taylor	Blue Sky	Co-producer
"On and On"	2014	Livingston Taylor	Blue Sky	Co-producer
"You Can Take Me Home"	2014	Livingston Taylor	Blue Sky	Co-producer
"Sweet Blindness"	2014	Livingston Taylor	Blue Sky	Co-producer
"Shouldn't Have Fallen"	2014	Livingston Taylor	Blue Sky	Co-producer
"Here You Come Again"	2014	Livingston Taylor	Blue Sky	Co-producer
"Paperback Writer"	2014	Livingston Taylor	Blue Sky	Co-producer
"Boatman"	2014	Livingston Taylor	Blue Sky	Co-producer
"Sleepy Is Good"	2014	Livingston Taylor	Blue Sky	Co-producer
"I Have Dreamed"	2014	Livingston Taylor	Blue Sky	Co-producer
"Pull Up"	2015	Jason Derulo	Everything Is 4	Co-writer, producer, backing vocals
"Broke"	2015	Jason Derulo	Everything Is 4	Co-writer, producer
"Bombastic"	2015	Bonnie McKee	Bombastic	Co-writer
"Slow Motion"	2015	Trey Songz	Trigga Reloaded	Co-writer, co-producer
"Serve it Up"	2015	Trey Songz	Trigga Reloaded	Co-writer, co-producer
"I See You"	2015	Kalin and Myles	Kalin and Myles	Co-producer, co-writer
"Working Class Heroes (Work)"	2015	CeeLo Green	Heart Blanche	Co-producer, co-writer
"I Feel Good"	2015	Thomas Rhett featuring LunchMoney Lewis	Tangled Up	Co-writer
"Dangerous Woman"	2016	Ariana Grande	Dangerous Woman	Beatbox
"Trouble"	2016	Offaiah	Non-album single	Co-writer, backing vocals
"Oops"	2016	Little Mix	Glory Days	Co-writer, co-producer, guest vocalist
"Cake"	2016	Flo Rida and 99 Percent	Non-album single	Co-writer
"So Good"	2017	Zara Larsson	So Good	Co-writer, co-producer
"Lips on You"	2017	Maroon 5	Red Pill Blues	Co-writer, co-producer
"Bedroom Floor"	2017	Liam Payne	LP1	Co-writer
"You Can Cry"	2018	Marshmello and Juicy J featuring James Arthur	Non-album single	Co-writer
"Love You Anymore"	2018	Michael Bublé	Love	Co-writer, backing vocals
"Why Don't We"	2019	Austin Mahone	Non-album single	Writer
"So Am I"	2019	Ava Max	Heaven & Hell	Co-writer
"Easier"	2019	5 Seconds of Summer	Calm	Co-writer, producer
"Small Talk"	2019	Katy Perry	Smile	Co-writer, co-producer
"Harleys in Hawaii"	2019	Katy Perry	Smile	Co-writer, co-producer, backing vocals
"Why Do You Love Me"	2019	Charlotte Lawrence	Non-album single	Co-writer, co-producer
"I Do"	2020	John Legend	Bigger Love	Co-writer, producer
"Tattoo"	2020	Ava Max	Heaven & Hell	Co-writer
"Anyone"	2021	Justin Bieber	Justice	Piano
"Bad Girl"	2021	Daya	The Difference	Co-writer
"Stay"	2021	The Kid Laroi and Justin Bieber	F*ck Love 3: Over You	Co-Writer, Co-producer
"Bad Day"	2021	Blackbear	Misery Lake	Co-Writer
"Older"	2021	Alec Benjamin	(Un)Commentary	Co-Writer
"What Would You Do?"	2022	Tate McRae	I Used to Think I Could Fly	Co-writer, producer
"Hate Myself"	2022	Tate McRae	I Used to Think I Could Fly	Co-writer, producer
"RIP You and Me"	2022	Alexander 23	Aftershock	Synthesizer, Piano
"Make You Say"	2022	Zedd, Maren Morris, Beauz	Non-album single	Co-writer
"Angel"	2023	PinkPantheress	Barbie the Album	Co-writer, Co-producer
"Still the One"	2024	Björnzone	Non-album single	Co-writer
"Like That"	2024	Babymonster	Babymons7er	Writer
"PerkySex"	2024	Lil Uzi Vert	Eternal Atake 2	Co-writer, producer
"Conceited"	2024	Lil Uzi Vert	Eternal Atake 2	Co-writer, producer

== Music videos ==
List of music videos, showing year released and director
Title	Year	Director(s)	Notes
"These Are My Sexy Shades"	2010	Unknown	
"Break Again"	2011	Unknown	
"Swag (Woop!)"	2011	Unknown	
"Seventeen"	2012	Unknown	
"Lights Go Out"	2013	Unknown	
"Look at Me Now"	2013	Unknown	
"L.U.V."	2014	Andrew Vallentine	
"Dear Future Husband"	2015	Fatima Robinson	Meghan Trainor's music video; Guest appearance only
"I Won't Tell a Soul"	2015	Charlie Puth	
"Marvin Gaye"	2015	Marc Klasfeld	
"See You Again"	2015	Marc Klasfeld	Wiz Khalifa's music video; Featured artist
"Nothing But Trouble"	2015	Ryan Staake	
"One Call Away"	2015	Mark Staubach	
"One Call Away" (Coast to Coast Mix)	2015	Unknown	
"Suffer" (Vince Staples & AndreaLo Remix)	2016	Austin Starrett Winchell	
"We Don't Talk Anymore"	2016	Phil Pinto	
"Dangerously"	2016	Aya Tanimura	
"Attention"	2017	Emil Nava	
"Boys"	2017	Charli XCX & Sarah McColgan	Charli XCX's music video; Guest appearance only
"How Long"	2017	Emil Nava	
"Done for Me"	2018	RJ Sanchez and Brendan Vaughan	
"Sober"	2018	Colin Tilley	G-Eazy's music video; Featured artist
"Done for Me" (Jazz Version)	2018	Mario Kristian and Marc Christian	
"The Way I Am"	2018	Colin Tilley	
"I Warned Myself"	2019	Brendan Vaughan	
"Mother"	2019	Dawit N.M	
"Cheating On You"	2019	Tyler Yee	
"Girlfriend"	2020	Drew Kirsch	
"Free"	2020	Unknown	
"Life's Good"	2021	Unknown	
"Light Switch"	2022	Christian Breslauer	
"That's Hilarious"	2022	Matthew Daniel Siskin	
"Left and Right"	2022	Drew Kirsch	
"Loser"	2022	Phillip R. Lopez	
"That's Not How This Works"	2023	Phillip R. Lopez	
"Changes"	2025	Charlotte Rutherford	
"Home"	2026	Hunter Moreno	
"Sideways"	2026	Hunter Moreno	
