= Voicenotes Tour =

2018 concert tour by Charlie Puth

- Tour by Charlie Puth
- Poster for Honda Civic leg of tour
- Associated album: Voicenotes
- Start date: July 11, 2018
- End date: November 22, 2018
- Legs: 2
- No. of shows: 45
- Website: civictour.honda.com

Charlie Puth concert chronology
- Don't Talk Tour (2016); Voicenotes Tour (2018)
Honda Civic Tour tour chronology
16th Annual Honda Civic Tour (2017)	Voicenotes Tour (2018)

The Voicenotes Tour was the third concert tour by American singer Charlie Puth, in support of his second studio album Voicenotes (2018). The tour began in Toronto, Canada at the Budweiser Stage on July 11, 2018, and concluded in Tokyo, Japan at the Tokyo International Forum on November 22, 2018.

== Background ==
On December 18, 2017, Puth announced his first major headlining tour after opening for Shawn Mendes on his Illuminate World Tour. Hailee Steinfeld was announced as the opening act. The tour dates were announced and set to take place in 32 different cities in North America.

On June 27, 2018, several dates were announced for Asia where the tour would be produced by Live Nation Asia.

== Critical reception ==
The tour received positive reviews. Taylor Weatherby from Billboard praised the stage setup, writing that “the angled backdrop includes two massive screens that flash between Charlie, mesmerizing light shows and crowd shots, making the otherwise pretty simple staging feel vast”, in addition to noting the “quirky commentary” between performances, Puth's “dad moves” during performances, and his “inspiring level of confidence” while shirtless. Bobby Olivier from NJ.com, described Puth as having “a severe case of pop star personality disorder”, praised Puth's use of a keytar as him having “played the hell out of an instrument in which no pop artist has seriously dabbled for the last five presidential administrations,” in addition to writing that “the deafening response to every close-up camera shot of the star’s face or body wasn’t far from how diehards manically cheer for his slightly more famous constituents Justin Bieber, Shawn Mendes and Harry Styles”. David Peng, from Young Post of South China Morning Post, praised Puth's vocals, describing them as “sweet and soft” with “his sound so clear it rivaled the studio-recorded version”.

== Set list ==
This set list is from the show in Toronto on July 11, 2018, and is not intended to represent all concerts for the tour.

1. "The Way I Am"
2. "Slow It Down"
3. "How Long"
4. "Empty Cups"
5. "LA Girls"
6. "Marvin Gaye"
7. "Patient"
8. "Change"
9. "We Don't Talk Anymore"
10. "Somebody Told Me"
11. "Done for Me"
12. "Suffer"
13. "One Call Away"
14. "Attention"

Encore

15. "BOY"
16. "See You Again"

== Tour dates ==
List of concerts, showing date, city, country, venue, opening acts, tickets sold, number of available tickets and amount of gross revenue
Date	City	Country	Venue	Opening act	Attendance	Revenue
Leg 1 – North America
July 11, 2018 (Note: Not a Honda Civic Tour date.)	Toronto	Canada	Budweiser Stage	Hailee Steinfeld	—	—
July 13, 2018	Boston	United States	Blue Hills Bank Pavilion	Hailee Steinfeld	—	—
July 16, 2018	New York City	United States	Radio City Music Hall	Hailee Steinfeld	—	—
July 19, 2018	Uncasville	United States	Mohegan Sun Arena	Hailee Steinfeld	—	—
July 21, 2018	Gilford	United States	Bank of New Hampshire Pavilion	Hailee Steinfeld	—	—
July 22, 2018	Saratoga Springs	United States	Saratoga Performing Arts Center	Hailee Steinfeld	—	—
July 24, 2018	Camden	United States	BB&T Pavilion	Hailee Steinfeld	—	—
July 25, 2018	Wolf Trap	United States	Filene Center	Hailee Steinfeld	—	—
July 27, 2018	Charlotte	United States	PNC Music Pavilion	Hailee Steinfeld	—	—
July 28, 2018	Raleigh	United States	Coastal Credit Union Music Park	Hailee Steinfeld	—	—
July 31, 2018	Chicago	United States	Huntington Bank Pavilion	Hailee Steinfeld	—	—
August 2, 2018	Clarkston	United States	DTE Energy Music Theatre	Hailee Steinfeld	—	—
August 3, 2018	Cincinnati	United States	Riverbend Music Center	Hailee Steinfeld	—	—
August 5, 2018	Noblesville	United States	Ruoff Home Mortgage Music Center	Hailee Steinfeld	—	—
August 6, 2018	Maryland Heights	United States	Hollywood Casino Amphitheatre	Hailee Steinfeld	—	—
August 8, 2018	Saint Paul	United States	Xcel Energy Center	Hailee Steinfeld	—	—
August 9, 2018	Kansas City	United States	Starlight Theatre	Hailee Steinfeld	—	—
August 11, 2018	Albuquerque	United States	Isleta Amphitheater	Hailee Steinfeld	—	—
August 12, 2018	Las Vegas	United States	Pearl Concert Theater	Hailee Steinfeld	—	—
August 14, 2018	Los Angeles	United States	Greek Theatre	Hailee Steinfeld	5,570 / 5,570	$360,183
August 15, 2018	Irvine	United States	FivePoint Amphitheatre	Hailee Steinfeld	—	—
August 17, 2018	Mountain View	United States	Shoreline Amphitheatre	Hailee Steinfeld	—	—
August 18, 2018	Stateline	United States	Lake Tahoe Outdoor Arena	Hailee Steinfeld	—	—
August 20, 2018	Chula Vista	United States	Mattress Firm Amphitheatre	Hailee Steinfeld	—	—
August 21, 2018	Phoenix	United States	Ak-Chin Pavilion	Hailee Steinfeld	—	—
August 23, 2018	Irving	United States	Toyota Music Factory	Hailee Steinfeld	—	—
August 24, 2018	The Woodlands	United States	Cynthia Woods Mitchell Pavilion	Hailee Steinfeld	—	—
August 26, 2018	Rogers	United States	Walmart Arkansas Music Pavilion	Hailee Steinfeld	—	—
August 28, 2018	Nashville	United States	Ascend Amphitheater	Hailee Steinfeld	—	—
August 29, 2018	Alpharetta	United States	Verizon Wireless Amphitheatre	Hailee Steinfeld	—	—
August 31, 2018	Tampa	United States	MidFlorida Credit Union Amphitheatre	Hailee Steinfeld	—	—
September 1, 2018	West Palm Beach	United States	Coral Sky Amphitheatre	Hailee Steinfeld	—	—
Leg 2 – Asia
October 29, 2018	Bangkok	Thailand	Impact Arena	—	—	
October 31, 2018	Shanghai	China	Mercedes-Benz Arena		—	—
November 2, 2018	Phnom Penh	Cambodia	Koh Pich	Kmeng Khmer; Laura Mam; SWSB; Adda	—	—
November 4, 2018	Hong Kong		AsiaWorld–Expo Hall 8&10	—N/a	—	—
November 7, 2018	Seoul	South Korea	Jamsil Arena	—N/a	—	—
November 8, 2018	Seoul	South Korea	Jamsil Arena	—N/a	—	—
November 10, 2018	Taoyuan	Taiwan	NTSU Arena	—N/a	—	—
November 13, 2018	Singapore		The Star Performing Arts Centre	—N/a	—	—
November 14, 2018	Shah Alam	Malaysia	Malawati Stadium	—N/a	—	—
November 16, 2018	Jakarta	Indonesia	Indonesia Convention Exhibition	Jaz	—	—
November 19, 2018	Osaka	Japan	Osaka Prefectural Gymnasium	—N/a	—	—
November 21, 2018	Chiba	Japan	Makuhari Messe	—N/a	—	—
November 22, 2018	Tokyo	Japan	Tokyo International Forum	—N/a	—	—
Total					—	—

== Cancelled shows ==
List of cancelled concerts, showing date, city, country, venue and reason for cancellation
Date	City	Country	Venue	Reason
July 14, 2018	Farmingville	United States	BMHMC Amphitheater	Unforeseen production challenges
November 6, 2018	Pasay	Philippines	Mall of Asia Arena	Unforeseen circumstances
