= Electronic Dance Music Awards =

Music awards show, founded in 2016

- Current: 2026 Electronic Dance Music Awards
- Awarded for: Performance in music platforms & radio airplay, recognizing artists and listeners
- Country: United States
- Presented by: iHeart Radio
- First award: 2022
- Website: edmawardsmiami.com

The Electronic Dance Music Awards (also known as the EDMAs) is an annual music award event focusing across most all electronic dance music genres. The awards are given out across a variety of categories including Song of the Year in Dance, Tech, House and Bass genres, Best Male and Female Artist, Best Collaboration, Remix of the Year, Best New Artist, Club DJ Of the Year, and Vocalist of the Year, among many others. The EDMAs are known as a star-studded affair, featuring a slew of leading DJs, music producers, international press and others comprising the industry's corps d'elite. The show is hosted by iHeart Radio personality, Radio Hall of Fame inductee, founder and executive producer Sean "Hollywood" Hamilton.

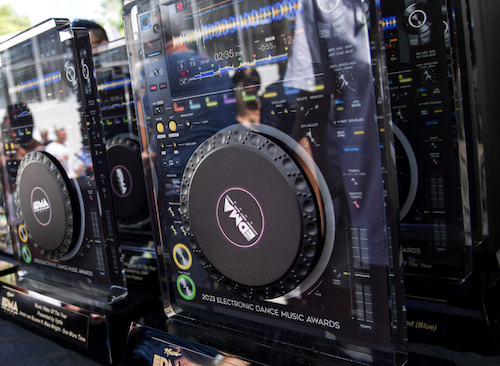
The EDMA Deck Award

The EDMAs are regarded by many as one of the most prestigious and significant awards in the electronic music community worldwide. Winners are presented with an EDMA Deck Award with their names engraved on the decks. The most recent ceremony was held on March 27, 2026.

== History ==
The EDMAs first began as a niche remix award show called the Radio Remix Awards supported by iHeart Radio, which were held annually for five years beginning in 2016. The first two ceremonies took place at the W Hotel in Miami, Florida during Ultra Music Festival and Miami Music Week on March 23–24, 2016 and 2017. Following a two-year break due to the COVID-19 pandemic, the awards re-branded themselves with the name Electronic Dance Music Awards and this time focused into covering more EDM genres. The 2023 EDMAs took place in Miami at an exclusive, industry invite-only pool party from the legendary Fontainebleau Miami Beach on March 24, coinciding with the first day of Ultra Music Festival the awards will be presented Hotel. The event is held annually in March at the Eden Roc Miami Beach Hotel in Miami during the Ultra Music Festival / Miami Music Week.

== Awards process ==
From 2016 to 2019, winners were originally determined based on two factors: North American radio airplay and best sound production judged by resident DJ's nationwide. Since 2022, the awards re-launched themselves as a completely fan-voted award show. Voting for the first EDMAs began in May and ended on June 17, 2022. For the second EDMAs nominations were announced on February 27, 2023. The full list of nominees for the third EDMAs were announced on February 19, 2024.

== Ceremonies ==
=== Electronic Dance Music Awards (since 2022) ===
==== 2022 ====
Complete list of winners and nominees see: 2022 Electronic Dance Music Awards.

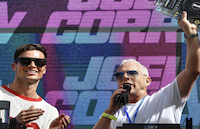
Joel Corry receives his "Deck" award from Sean Hamilton. (2023)

==== 2023 ====
Complete list of winners and nominees see: 2023 Electronic Dance Music Awards.

==== 2024 ====
Complete list of winners and nominees see: 2024 Electronic Dance Music Awards.

==== 2025 ====
Complete list of winners and nominees see: 2025 Electronic Dance Music Awards.

==== 2026 ====
Complete list of winners and nominees see: 2026 Electronic Dance Music Awards.

=== Remix Awards (2016–2019) ===
==== 2016 ====
The following is a list of winners at the 2016 Remix Awards:

Category	Winners
Remix of the Year – Radio Airplay	Adele – "Hello" (Paul Damixie Remix)
Remix of the Year – Production	Nick Jonas – "Chains" (Audien Remix)
Best Rise & Drop	Rihanna – "Bitch Better Have My Money" (Diplo & Grandtheft Remix)
Best Remix in Urban Category	Drake – "Hotline Bling" (James Hype Remix)
Best Down Tempo, Turned Up	The Chainsmokers – "Roses" (The Him Remix)
Best Remix in Trap Category	Fetty Wap – "679" (K Theory Remix)
Best Use of Vocal	DJ Snake ft. AlunaGeorge – "You Know You Like It" (Tchami Remix)
Best Extended Radio Edit	Zedd ft. Selena Gomez – "I Want You to Know"
Best Bootleg	Selena Gomez ft. ASAP Rocky – "Good For You" (The Scene Kings Remix)
Remix Producer of the Year	Cosmic Dawn – Lillehammer, Norway
Best Banger	Jack U ft. Justin Bieber – "Where Are Ü Now" (Kaskade Remix)
Mixshow DJ of the Year	DJ Bodega Brad – New York, N.Y.

==== 2017 ====
The following is a list of nominees and winners at the 2017 iHeart Radio Remix Awards:

Category	Winners and nominees
Remix of the Year – Radio Airplay	Mike Posner – "I Took a Pill in Ibiza" (Seeb Remix)
Remix of the Year – Radio Airplay	Justin Bieber - "Love Yourself" (Kue remix)
Remix of the Year – Radio Airplay	Justin Timberlake - "Can't Stop the Feeling!" (Fenix remix)
Remix of the Year – Radio Airplay	Kiiara - "Gold" (Achtabahn remix)
Remix of the Year – Radio Airplay	Alessia Cara - "Here" (Cosmic Dawn remix)
Remix of the Year – Production	Twenty One Pilots - "Heathens" (LODATO & Joseph Duveen remix)
Remix of the Year – Production	Alessia Cara - "Here" (Kue remix)
Remix of the Year – Production	DNCE - "Cake by the Ocean" (Kue remix)
Remix of the Year – Production	Twenty One Pilots - "Stressed Out" (Dave Winnel remix)
Remix of the Year – Production	Justin Bieber - "Sorry" (Wide Awake remix)
Remix Producer of the Year	DJ Kue
Remix Producer of the Year	Seeb
Remix Producer of the Year	Danny Dove
Remix Producer of the Year	Country Club Martini Crew
Remix Producer of the Year	The Scene Kings
Remix Producer of the Year	LODATO
Best Bootleg	Justin Timberlake - "Can't Stop the Feeling!" (Fenix remix)
Best Bootleg	Twenty One Pilots - "Heathens" (LODATO & Joseph Duveen remix)
Best Bootleg	Gnash - "I Hate U, I Love U" (PBH & Jack Shizzle remix)
Best Bootleg	Jon Bellion - "All Time Low" (Cash Cash remix)
Best Bootleg	Lukas Graham - "7 Years" (Night Moves Remix)
Best Extended Radio Edit	The Chainsmokers - "Don't Let Me Down"
Best Extended Radio Edit	Zhu, Skrillex, & THEY - "Working For It"
Best Extended Radio Edit	Skrillex & Rick Ross - "Purple Lamborghini"
Best Extended Radio Edit	Major Lazer ft. Justin Bieber & MØ - "Cold Water"
Best Extended Radio Edit	Calvin Harris - "How Deep Is Your Love"
Best Remix in Rap	DRAM ft. Lil Yachty - "Broccoli" (Herobust remix)
Best Remix in Rap	Desiigner - "Panda" (Afrojack remix)
Best Remix in Rap	Kanye West - "Fade" (Freejak remix)
Best Remix in Rap	Travis Scott - "Antidote" (Lookas remix)
Best Remix in Rap	Kent Jones - "Don't Mind" (DJ Noiz remix)
Best Trap Remix	Desiigner - "Panda" (Afrojack remix)
Best Trap Remix	Travis Scott - "Antidote" (Lookas remix)
Best Trap Remix	Twenty One Pilots - "Heathens" (LODATO & Joseph Duveen remix)
Best Trap Remix	Zara Larsson & MNEK - "Never Forget You" (Pyrodox remix)
Best Trap Remix	Anne-Marie - "Alarm" (Marshmello remix)
Best Trap Remix	Twenty One Pilots - "Ride" (Jaydon Lewis remix)
Best Trap Remix	The Chainsmokers ft. Halsey - "Closer" (T-Mass remix)
Best Use of Vocal	Anne-Marie - "Alarm" (Marshmello remix)
Best Use of Vocal	Kiiara - "Gold" (Achtabahn remix)
Best Use of Vocal	Mike Posner – "I Took a Pill in Ibiza" (Jason Risk Remix)
Best Use of Vocal	Lukas Graham - "7 Years" (Night Moves Remix)
Best Use of Vocal	G Eazy ft. Bebe Rexha - "Me, Myself & I" (Oliver Heldens Remix)
Best Use of Vocal	Justin Bieber - "Sorry" (Wide Awake remix)
Best Use of Vocal	Rihanna - "Love on the Brain" (Don Diablo remix)
Best Use of Vocal	Calvin Harris ft. Rihanna - "This Is What You Came For" (Dillon Francis remix)
Best Banger	DNCE - "Cake by the Ocean" (Kue remix)
Best Banger	Calvin Harris ft. Rihanna - "This Is What You Came For" (R3hab & Henry Fong remix)
Best Banger	Twenty One Pilots - "Ride" (Steve Smooth & Tony Arzadon remix)
Best Banger	Desiigner - "Panda" (Afrojack remix)
Best Banger	Major Lazer ft. Justin Bieber & MØ - "Cold Water" (Dark Intensity remix)
Best Banger	The Chainsmokers ft. Daya - "Don't Let Me Down" (Zomboy remix)
Best Banger	Sia ft. Sean Paul - "Cheap Thrills" (John J-C Carr remix)
Best Rise/Drop	Twenty One Pilots - "Ride" (Steve Smooth & Tony Arzadon remix)
Best Rise/Drop	Major Lazer ft. Justin Bieber & MØ - "Cold Water" (Dark Intensity remix)
Best Rise/Drop	Rae Sremmurd ft. Gucci Mane - "Black Beatles" (MAKJ remix)
Best Rise/Drop	Sia ft. Sean Paul - "Cheap Thrills" (John J-C Carr remix)
Best Rise/Drop	Ariana Grande - "Into You" (Steven Redant remix)
Best Rise/Drop	Twenty One Pilots - "Stressed Out" (Dave Winnel remix)
Best Rise/Drop	Daya - "Hide Away" (Randy Taylor-Weber, Lenny Ruckus & DJ Fierce remix)
Best Downtempo Turned Up	Jon Bellion - "All Time Low" (Cash Cash remix)
Best Downtempo Turned Up	Ariana Grande ft. Nicki Minaj - "Side to Side" (High-Rizers remix)
Best Downtempo Turned Up	The Chainsmokers ft. Halsey - "Closer" (Kahikko & Jespr remix)
Best Downtempo Turned Up	Twenty One Pilots - "Ride" (Steve Smooth & Tony Arzadon remix)
Best Downtempo Turned Up	X Ambassadors - "Unsteady" (LODATO & Joseph Duveen remix)
Best Downtempo Turned Up	Rihanna - "Love on the Brain" (Don Diablo remix)
Best Remix Collaboration	Major Lazer ft. Justin Bieber & MØ - "Cold Water" (The Scene Kings, DJ Scene & Diggz remix)
Best Remix Collaboration	The Chainsmokers ft. Halsey - "Closer" (Danny Dove & Nathan C remix)
Best Remix Collaboration	DJ Snake ft. Justin Bieber - "Let Me Love You" (Danny Dove & Offset remix)
Best Remix Collaboration	Twenty One Pilots - "Ride" (Steve Smooth & Tony Arzadon remix)
Best Remix Collaboration	Drake ft. Whisked & Kyla - "One Dance" (White & Da Pierre remix)
Mixshow DJ of the Year	Marc Stout – B96 (Chicago)
Mixshow DJ of the Year	Bodega Brad – RT30 (New York)
Mixshow DJ of the Year	Riddler – CBS
Mixshow DJ of the Year	Jay Dabhi – AMP (New York)
Mixshow DJ of the Year	Jay Mac – MRL
Mixshow DJ of the Year	DJ Drew – Kiis FM (Los Angeles)
Mixshow DJ of the Year	DJ Tyco – RT30 (Canada)
Mixshow DJ of the Year	Mr. Mig & Gino Caporale – RT30 (Philadelphia)
Mixshow DJ of the Year	Tony Gia – RT30 (New Jersey)

==== 2018 ====
The following is a list of nominees and winners at the 2018 Remix Awards:

Category	Winners and nominees
Remix of the Year – Radio Airplay	Bruno Mars – "Versace on the Floor" (David Guetta remix)
Remix of the Year – Radio Airplay	Linkin Park ft. Kiiara - "Heavy" (Nicky Romero remix)
Remix of the Year – Radio Airplay	Kygo & Selena Gomez - "It Ain't Me" (DJ Obscene remix)
Remix of the Year – Radio Airplay	James Arthur - "Say You Won't Let Go" (Kue remix)
Remix of the Year – Radio Airplay	Sam Smith - "Too Good at Goodbyes" (Mike N*E*R*D remix)
Remix of the Year – Production	J Balvin - "Mi Gente" (Cedric Gervais remix)
Remix of the Year – Production	Charlie Puth - "Attention" (Oliver Heldens remix)
Remix of the Year – Production	Camila Cabello ft. Young Thug - "Havana" (Danny Dove remix)
Remix of the Year – Production	Ed Sheeran - "Shape of You" (Nathan C remix)
Remix of the Year – Production	Luis Fonsi ft. Daddy Yankee & Justin Bieber - "Despacito" (Aximize remix)
Best Bootleg	DJ Khaled ft. Justin Bieber, Lil Wayne, Chance The Rapper & Quavo - "I'm the One" (Pat C remix)
Best Bootleg	Luis Fonsi ft. Daddy Yankee & Justin Bieber - "Despacito" (The Scene Kings remix)
Best Bootleg	French Montana ft. Swae Lee vs. Sak Noel & Salvi - "Unforgettable Trumpets" (Lodato remix)
Best Bootleg	Katy Perry vs. Major Lazer - "Chained to the Lighter" (DJs From Mars remix)
Best Bootleg	Flo Rida vs. Tujamo - "Low vs Drop It Low" (Joe Maz remix)
Dance Song of the Year (Non Remix)	Cheat Codes ft. Demi Lovato - "No Promises"
Dance Song of the Year (Non Remix)	CamelPhat & Elderbrook - "Cola"
Dance Song of the Year (Non Remix)	Marshmello ft. Khalid - "Silence"
Dance Song of the Year (Non Remix)	Axwell & Ingrosso - "More Than You Know"
Dance Song of the Year (Non Remix)	Phantoms ft. Vérité - "Just A Feeling"
Best Remix in Latin	Luis Fonsi ft. Daddy Yankee & Justin Bieber - "Despacito" (Major Lazer and Moska remix)
Best Remix in Latin	J Balvin - "Mi Gente" (Sunnery James & Ryan Marciano remix)
Best Remix in Latin	Enrique Iglesias ft. Descemer Bueno & Zion & Lennox - "Súbeme la Radio" (Robbie Rivera remix)
Best Remix in Latin	Shakira - "Me Enamoré" (Pablo Mas & Juan Alcaraz remix)
Best Remix in Latin	Maluma - "Felices Los 4" (Marc Anthony Salsa remix)
Best Remix in Rap	Cardi B - "Bodak Yellow" (CID remix)
Best Remix in Rap	Kendrick Lamar - "Humble" (Skrillex remix)
Best Remix in Rap	French Montana ft. Swae Lee "Unforgettable" (Dean E-G remix)
Best Remix in Rap	Post Malone - "Congratulations" (Dzeko remix)
Best Remix in Rap	KYLE ft. Lil Yachty - "I Spy" (Steve Smooth & Tony Arzadon remix)
Best Remix in Trap	Migos - "Bad and Boujee" (All Gold remix)
Best Remix in Trap	Future - "Mask Off" (MAKJ remix)
Best Remix in Trap	Bruno Mars - "That's What I Like" (Cabuizee remix)
Best Remix in Trap	Zara Larsson - "Ain't My Fault" (R3hab remix)
Best Remix in Trap	Big Sean - "Bounce Back" (DJ Valid remix)
Best Use Of Vocal	Alessia Cara - "Scars To Your Beautiful" (Cages remix)
Best Use Of Vocal	Imagine Dragons - "Believer" (Kaskade remix)
Best Use Of Vocal	Linkin Park ft. Kiiara - "Heavy" (Nicky Romero remix)
Best Use Of Vocal	Niall Horan - "Slow Hands" (Basic Tape remix)
Best Use Of Vocal	Charlie Puth - "Attention" (Bingo Players remix)
Best Banger	Michael Jackson - "Thriller" (Steve Aoki remix)
Best Banger	The Chainsmokers - "Something Just Like This" (eSQUIRE remix)
Best Banger	KYLE ft. Lil Yachty - "I Spy" (Steve Smooth & Tony Arzadon remix)
Best Banger	Cheat Codes ft. Demi Lovato - "No Promises" (Hook N Sling remix)
Best Banger	Kendrick Lamar - "Humble" (Skrillex Remix)
Best Rise/Drop	Zedd ft. Alessia Cara - "Stay" (Jonas Blue remix)
Best Rise/Drop	Marshmello - "Silence" (Tiesto remix)
Best Rise/Drop	David Guetta & Justin Bieber - "2U" (Afrojack remix)
Best Rise/Drop	The Chainsmokers & Coldplay - "Something Just Like This" (Don Diablo remix)
Best Rise/Drop	J Balvin - "Mi Gente" (Cedric Gervais remix)
Best Down Tempo Turned Up	Ed Sheeran - "Perfect" (TwoDB remix)
Best Down Tempo Turned Up	Machine Gun Kelly ft. Camila Cabello - "Bad Things" (Jump Smokers remix)
Best Down Tempo Turned Up	Halsey - "Now or Never" (R3hab remix)
Best Down Tempo Turned Up	Sam Smith - "Too Good at Goodbyes" (Galantis remix)
Best Down Tempo Turned Up	Julia Michaels - "Issues" (Carlos Mojica remix)
Best Remix Collaboration	KYLE ft. Lil Yachty - "I Spy" (Steve Smooth & Tony Arzadon remix)
Best Remix Collaboration	Zedd & Alessia Cara - "Stay" (Mig & Gino remix)
Best Remix Collaboration	Kygo & Ellie Goulding - "First Time" (Danny Dove & Nathan C remix)
Best Remix Collaboration	Katy Perry - "Chained To The Rhythm" (Marc Stout & Scott Svejda remix)
Best Remix Collaboration	Clean Bandit ft. Anne-Marie & Sean Paul - "Rockabye" (Lodato & Joseph Duveen remix)
Remixer of the Year	TIE: Dark Intensity & Cabuizee
Remixer of the Year	Barry Harris
Remixer of the Year	Danny Dove
Remixer of the Year	Nathan C
Remixer of the Year	Two DB
Remixer of the Year	Don Diablo
Rising Remixer of the Year	TwoDB
Rising Remixer of the Year	Alphalove
Rising Remixer of the Year	Nathan Jain
Rising Remixer of the Year	TRP
Rising Remixer of the Year	Jason Reilly
Rising Remixer of the Year	Aximize
Mixshow DJ of the Year	DJ Obscene - RT30
Mixshow DJ of the Year	DJ Dramos - Z100 New York
Mixshow DJ of the Year	DJ Tony Gia - RT30
Mixshow DJ of the Year	DJ Tyco - RT30
Mixshow DJ of the Year	DJ Bodega Brad - RT30
Mixshow DJ of the Year	DJ Drew - KIISFM Los Angeles
Mixshow DJ of the Year	Marc Stout - B96 Chicago
Mixshow DJ of the Year	Riddler - CBS Houston

==== 2019 ====
The following is a list of nominees and winners at the 2019 Remix Awards:

Category	Winners and nominees
Remix of the Year – Radio Airplay	Panic! at the Disco - "High Hopes" (Gozzi remix)
Remix of the Year – Radio Airplay	Lauv - "I Like Me Better" (Kue remix)
Remix of the Year – Radio Airplay	Shawn Mendes - "Lost In Japan" (Zedd remix)
Remix of the Year – Radio Airplay	Why Don't We - "8 Letters" (R3hab remix)
Remix of the Year – Radio Airplay	Camila Cabello - "Never Be The Same" (Gozzi remix)
Remix of the Year – Production	Khalid & Normani - "Love Lies" (Wild Cards remix)
Remix of the Year – Production	Travis Scott ft. Drake & Swae Lee - "Sicko Mode" (Skrillex remix)
Remix of the Year – Production	Marshmello & Anne-Marie - "Friends" (Kokiri remix)
Remix of the Year – Production	Halsey ft. Big Sean & Stefflon Don - "Alone" (Calvin Harris remix)
Remix of the Year – Production	Marshmello & Anne-Marie - "Friends" (M-22 remix)
Remix of the Year – Production	The Weeknd & Kendrick Lamar - "Pray For Me" (Charlie Lane remix)
Best Mashup	Marshmello & Bastille "Happier" vs Halsey ft. Big Sean & Stefflon Don "Alone" (Cream Alone remix)
Best Mashup	Enur "Calabria" vs Post Malone "Congratulations" (DJs From Mars remix)
Best Mashup	Zedd & Maren Morris & GREY "The Middle" vs Calvin Harris "Feel So Close" (Dramos remix)
Best Mashup	Marshmello & Bastille vs Magnificence - "Happier & Closer" (Lodato remix)
Best Mashup	Fisher vs Justin Timberlake - "I’m Losing Sexyback" (SJUR remix)
Best Mashup	G-Eazy & A$AP Rocky vs N.E.R.D. & Rihanna vs Jason Derulo vs French Montana vs Sage The Gemini - "No Lemons" (Happy Cat Disco remix)
Dance Song of the Year (Non Remix)	Silk City ft. Dua Lipa - "Electricity"
Dance Song of the Year (Non Remix)	Loud Luxury ft. Brando, "Body"
Dance Song of the Year (Non Remix)	David Guetta & Martin Garrix & Brooks - "Like I Do"
Dance Song of the Year (Non Remix)	Calvin Harris & Dua Lipa - "One Kiss"
Dance Song of the Year (Non Remix)	Fisher - "Losing It"
Best Remix in Latin	Cardi B ft. Bad Bunny & J Balvin - "I Like It" (Dillon Francis remix)
Best Remix in Latin	DJ Snake ft. Selena Gomez, Ozuna & Cardi B - "Taki Taki" (FENIX & Joe Maz remix)
Best Remix in Latin	Bad Bunny ft. Drake - "MIA" (Henry Fong remix)
Best Remix in Latin	Nicky Jam & J Balvin - "X" (Nejtrino & Baur remix)
Best Remix in Latin	DJ Kass - "Scooby Doo Pa Pa" (Pitbull remix)
Best Remix in Rap	Drake - "God’s Plan" (Joe Maz remix)
Best Remix in Rap	Travis Scott ft. Drake & Swae Lee - "Sicko Mode" (Skrillex remix)
Best Remix in Rap	Drake - "Nice For What" (DJ Valid remix)
Best Remix in Rap	Cardi B ft. Bad Bunny & J Balvin - "I Like It" (Carlos Mojica remix)
Best Remix in Rap	Post Malone ft. Ty Dolla $ign - "Psycho" (Charlie Lane remix)
Best Remix in Trap	Travis Scott ft. Drake & Swae Lee - "Sicko Mode" (Skrillex remix)
Best Remix in Trap	Bryce Vine - "Drew Barrymore" (Crankdat remix)
Best Remix in Trap	Post Malone - "Better Now" (Romen Jewels remix)
Best Remix in Trap	Zedd, Maren Morris & GREY, "The Middle" (KAYVIAN remix)
Best Remix in Trap	Panic At The Disco - "High Hopes" (Noodles remix)
Best Use Of Vocal	Taylor Swift - "Delicate" (Dark Intensity)
Best Use Of Vocal	Selena Gomez - "Back to You" (Panuma, Unregular & Yanic remix)
Best Use Of Vocal	Sam Smith - "Pray" (MK remix)
Best Use Of Vocal	Halsey ft. Big Sean & Stefflon Don - "Alone" (CID remix)
Best Use Of Vocal	Bazzi - "Mine" (Eden Prince remix)
Best Banger	Tiesto & Dzeko ft. Post Malone & Preme - "Jackie Chan" (Laidback Luke remix)
Best Banger	5 Seconds of Summer - "Youngblood" (MIDTOWN JACK remix)
Best Banger	Charlie Puth - "The Way I Am" (Slushii remix)
Best Banger	Halsey ft. Big Sean & Stefflon Don - "Alone" (Calvin Harris remix)
Best Banger	Calvin Harris & Dua Lipa - "One Kiss" (R3hab remix)
Best Banger	Madison Beer - "Hurts Like Hell" (Freaks 'n' Beatz remix)
Best Rise/Drop	Charlie Puth - "The Way I Am" (Slushii remix)
Best Rise/Drop	DJ Khaled ft. Justin Bieber, Quavo & Chance The Rapper - "No Brainer" (Clarx remix)
Best Rise/Drop	LSD - "Thunderclouds" (Country Club Martini Crew remix)
Best Rise/Drop	Selena Gomez - "Back to You" (Two DB remix)
Best Rise/Drop	Calvin Harris & Dua Lipa - "One Kiss" (R3hab remix)
Best Down Tempo Turned Up	Lovelytheband - "Broken" (Cash Cash remix)
Best Down Tempo Turned Up	Post Malone - "Better Now" (Jacked remix)
Best Down Tempo Turned Up	Benny Blanco ft. Khalid & Halsey - "Eastside" (Galantis remix)
Best Down Tempo Turned Up	Drake - "God's Plan" (David Puente VIP remix)
Best Down Tempo Turned Up	Cardi B ft. Bad Bunny & J Balvin - "I Like It" (Pink Panda remix)
Best Down Tempo Turned Up	Halsey - "Without Me" (TRP remix)
Best Down Tempo Turned Up	Marshmello & Bastille - "Happier" (Breathe Carolina remix)
Best Down Tempo Turned Up	Bazzi - "Beautiful" (KREAM remix)
Best Remix Collaboration	Travis Scott ft. Drake & Swae Lee - "Sicko Mode" (Tony Arzadon & Marc Stout remix)
Best Remix Collaboration	Loud Luxury ft. Brando - "Body" (PBH & Jack Shizzle remix)
Best Remix Collaboration	Selena Gomez - "Back to You" (Panuma, Unregular & Yanic remix)
Best Remix Collaboration	Calvin Harris & Dua Lipa - "One Kiss" (Jason Reilly & Alphalove remix)
Best Remix Collaboration	Kygo ft. Miguel - "Remind Me to Forget" (Kahikko & Goya remix)
Remixer of the Year	R3hab
Remixer of the Year	Two DB
Remixer of the Year	Charlie Lane
Remixer of the Year	Pink Panda
Remixer of the Year	Alphalove
Remixer of the Year	Romen Jewels
Remixer of the Year	Dark Intensity
Rising Remixer of the Year	Charlie Lane
Rising Remixer of the Year	Petedown
Rising Remixer of the Year	Colin Jay
Rising Remixer of the Year	Andrew Marks
Rising Remixer of the Year	Gozzi
Mixshow DJ of the Year	Moe Shalizi (The Shalizi Group)
Mixshow DJ of the Year	DJ Dramos - Z100 New York
Mixshow DJ of the Year	DJ Tony Gia - RT30
Mixshow DJ of the Year	DJ Tyco - RT30
Mixshow DJ of the Year	DJ Bodega Brad - RT30
Mixshow DJ of the Year	DJ Drew - KIISFM Los Angeles
Mixshow DJ of the Year	Marc Stout - B96 Chicago
Mixshow DJ of the Year	Riddler - CBS Houston
Mixshow DJ of the Year	DJ Flipside - B96 Chicago

== Categories ==
=== Current categories ===
The general categories includes: Producer Of The Year, Male and Female Artist Of The Year, Vocalist Of The Year, Label Of The Year, Best Group and Breakthrough / New Artist Of The Year. These categories highlighted in each award and other categories are divided by genre.

=== General ===
- Producer Of The Year
- Male Artist Of The Year
- Female Artist Of The Year
- Vocalist Of The Year
- Label Of The Year
- Music Video Of The Year
- Breakthrough Artist of the Year
- Best Collaboration
- Best Group
- Best Radio Show
- Best Instrumental Non-Vocal Release
- Best Fan Army
- Album Of The Year (Since 2024)

=== Dance ===
- Dance Song Of The Year
- Dance Radio Song Of The Year
- Dance Radio Artist of the Year
- Dance / Electro Pop Song of the Year

=== Techno / House ===
- Techno Artist of the Year
- Tech House Artist Of The Year
- Techno Song of the Year
- Tech House Song Of The Year
- House Song Of The Year

=== Dubstep ===
- Dubstep Artist Of The Year

=== Trance ===
- Breakthrough Trance Artist of the Year

=== Drum and Bass ===
- DnB (Drum and Bass) Artist of the Year
- DnB (Drum and Bass) Song of the Year
- Breakthrough Artist of the Year (Bass)

=== DJ ===
- Club DJ of The Year
- Nightlife DJ Of The Year
- Mixshow DJ Of The Year (Top 40 / Dance)
- Favorite Nightclub Residency (U.S.)

=== Festivals ===
- Main Stage/Festival Song of the Year
- Favorite Festival Series (U.S.)
- Best Performance
- Best B2B

=== Mashup / Remix ===
- Mashup Of The Year
- Mashup Artist Of The Year
- Remix Of The Year
- Remixer Of The Year
- Rising Remixer Of The Year
- Rising Mashup Artist of the Year
- Best Down Tempo Turned Up
- Remix Rewind
- Best Use of Sample
- Remake of the Year
- Radio Remixer Of The Year

=== Special awards ===
==== EDMA Legend Award ====
- Deadmau5 (2024)
- Carl Cox (2026)

==== EDMA Icon Award ====
- VASSY (2023)
- Mark Knight (2024)
- Bebe Rexha (2026)
- Benny Benassi (2026)

EDMA Vanguard Award

- Sara Landry (2026)

==== Industry Achievement ====
- Pasquale Rotella (2022)
