= Charlie Puth =

American singer-songwriter (born 1991)

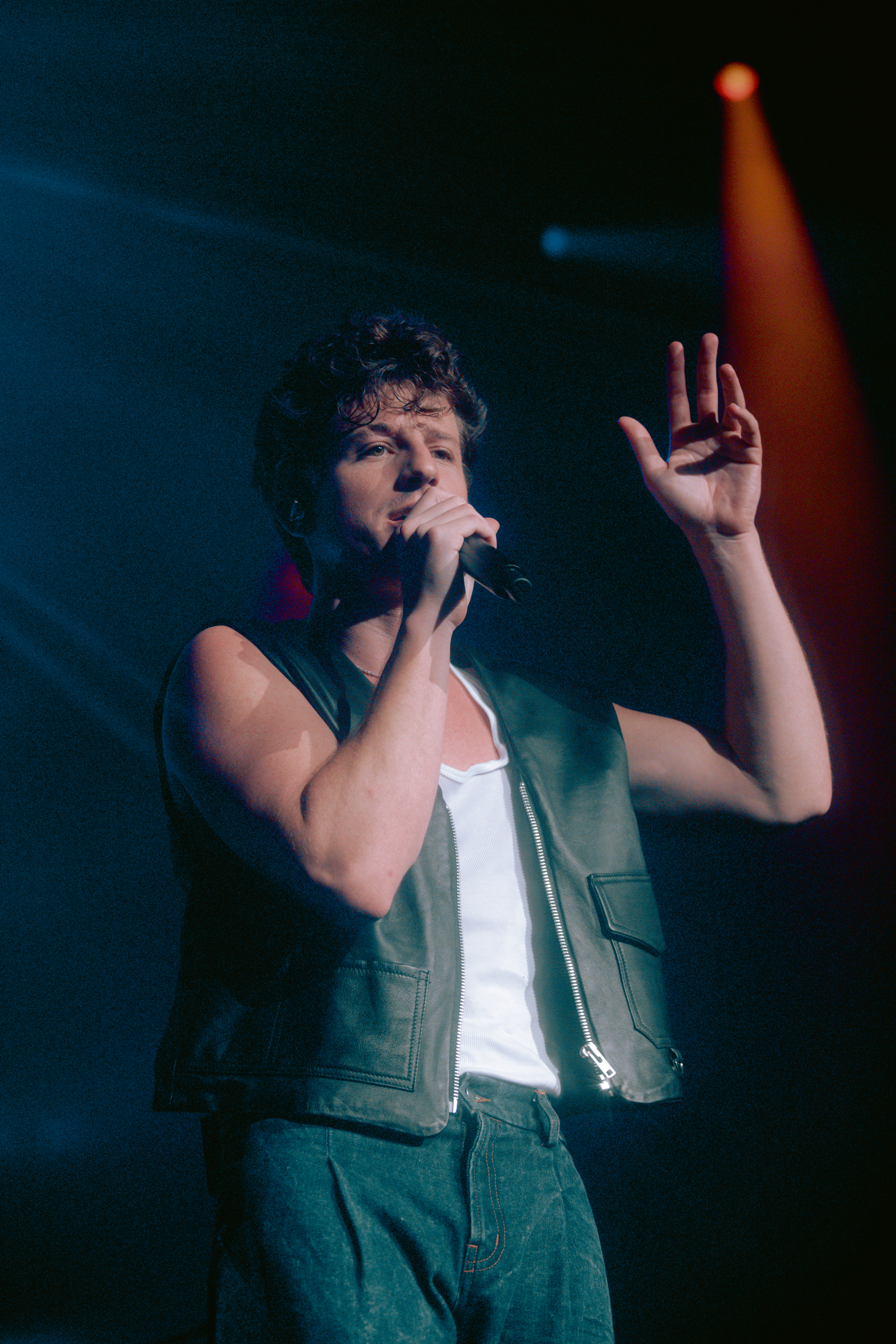
- Puth in 2023
- Born: Charles Otto Puth Jr. December 2, 1991 (age 34); Rumson, New Jersey, United States
- Education: Berklee College of Music (BM)
- Occupations: Singer; songwriter; record producer
- Works: Discography
- Spouse: Brooke Sansone (m. 2024)
- Children: 1
- Musical career
- Genres: Pop; R&B
- Instruments: Vocals; piano
- Years active: 2009–present
- Labels: APG; Atlantic; Loudr; eleveneleven
- Website: charlieputh.com

Charles Otto Puth Jr. (/puːθ/; born December 2, 1991) is an American singer-songwriter and record producer. His initial exposure came through the viral success of his song covers uploaded to YouTube. Puth signed with the record label eleveneleven in 2011.

Puth signed with Atlantic Records and Artist Partner Group to release his debut single, "Marvin Gaye" (featuring Meghan Trainor), in 2015. Later that year, he co-wrote, produced, and guest performed on Wiz Khalifa's single "See You Again", which peaked atop the US Billboard Hot 100 for 12 non-consecutive weeks, received diamond certification from the Recording Industry Association of America (RIAA), and earned him a Golden Globe Award for Best Original Song nomination, along with three nominations at the 58th Annual Grammy Awards, including Song of the Year.

"Marvin Gaye" served as lead single for Puth's debut studio album, Nine Track Mind (2016), which, despite critical failure, peaked within the top ten of both the Billboard 200 and UK Albums Chart. Its single, "We Don't Talk Anymore" (featuring Selena Gomez), peaked at number 9 on the Billboard Hot 100. His second album, Voicenotes (2018), was met with a critical incline and similar commercial success; it spawned the hit single "Attention" and was nominated for Best Engineered Album, Non-Classical at the 61st Annual Grammy Awards. Puth's third studio album, Charlie (2022), likewise debuted within the Billboard 200's top 10, and was supported by the top 40 singles "Light Switch" and "Left and Right" (featuring Jungkook). His fourth album, Whatever's Clever!, was released in March 2026.

Alongside recording, Puth's career in production and songwriting for other artists has proved commercially successful. He co-wrote and produced the Justin Bieber and the Kid Laroi's 2021 song "Stay", which became his first non-performing production to peak the Billboard Hot 100.

== Early life ==
Charles Otto Puth Jr. was born on December 2, 1991, in Rumson, New Jersey, to Debra, a music teacher who also wrote commercials for HBO, and Charles Otto Puth Sr., a builder and real estate agent. He has two younger siblings, twins Stephen and Mikaela. His father is Catholic and his mother is Jewish. Puth was raised Catholic.

When Puth was two years old, his right eyebrow was permanently scarred in a nearly fatal dog bite incident. His mother introduced him to classical music and began teaching him the piano at age four. He started studying jazz at age 10 and participated in a summer youth jazz ensemble at Count Basie Theatre's Cool School in Red Bank, New Jersey, at 12. Puth was once hired by The Count Basie Theatre to play in a Charlie Brown production. In grade six, he went door to door selling a Christmas album called Have a Very Charlie Christmas that he had recorded and produced, making $600 in sales. He also played music in church as a child.

He attended the Holy Cross School and Forrestdale Middle School in Rumson before graduating from the Rumson-Fair Haven Regional High School in 2010. During his seventh grade to senior years, he attended Manhattan School of Music Pre-College as a jazz piano major and a classical studies minor. Puth is a 2013 graduate of Berklee College of Music, where he majored in music production and engineering.

== Career ==
=== 2009–2014: Career beginnings ===
A jingle written and performed by Puth for a YouTuber in 2009

In September 2009, at age 17, Puth started his own YouTube channel, entitled Charlies Vlogs, posting comedy videos and acoustic covers. During this time, he would make theme songs and jingles for other YouTubers.

In 2010, Puth released the music video of his first song, "These Are My Sexy Shades". In December 2010, he released his debut extended play, The Otto Tunes, an independent release. In 2011, he won an online video competition sponsored by Perez Hilton, Can You Sing?, with a version of Adele's "Someone like You", which he performed with Emily Luther. In the same year Ellen DeGeneres announced that she had signed Puth and Luther to her label, eleveneleven, after seeing their performance of "Someone like You". Puth and Luther had performed the song on the show. In December 2011 he released a promotional single, "Break Again", with additional vocals by Emily Luther. The music video was released days later.

On January 25, 2012, Puth and Luther performed the song and Lady Antebellum's "Need You Now" on The Ellen DeGeneres Show. Puth also performed at an event supporting DKMS Delete Blood Cancer, the world's largest bone marrow donor center, in October 2012. Puth left eleveneleven in late 2012. On October 23, 2013, he released his second independent extended play, Ego, to streaming online. Puth was credited with the production and writing of songs and jingles for fellow YouTube personalities. He wrote the theme song for Shane Dawson's Shane and Friends podcast and skits, the intro jingle for the videos of the Vlogger family the SHAYTARDS, the original theme song for Charles Trippy's vlog Internet Killed Television, and a song for the tour and movie of YouTube group Our 2nd Life, as well as several singles for Our 2nd Life member Ricky Dillon. In 2014 he released the promotional single "L.U.V." The music video was directed by Andrew Vallentine. In the same year, he co-wrote the song "Celebrate" by Pitbull, included in his eighth studio album Globalization and featured in the 2014 DreamWorks Animation film Penguins of Madagascar.

=== 2015–2016: "See You Again" and Nine Track Mind ===
In early 2015, Puth signed with APG/Atlantic, and his previous records were removed from iTunes. In February 2015, Puth released his debut single "Marvin Gaye", which features American singer-songwriter Meghan Trainor. The single has been certified 2× Platinum in Australia, topped the charts in New Zealand, Ireland, and the United Kingdom, and peaked at number 21 on the US Billboard Hot 100. Puth wrote, co-produced, and was featured on a song with Wiz Khalifa, "See You Again", a tribute to Paul Walker, included in the Furious 7 soundtrack. While Khalifa wrote the rap lyrics, the rest of the song has been credited to Puth. The song peaked at number 1 on the Hot 100 chart for twelve non-consecutive weeks. "See You Again" was nominated for three Grammy Awards: Song of the Year, Best Pop Duo/Group Performance and Best Song Written for Visual Media. It was also shortlisted for the Song of the Year for the BBC Music Awards and was nominated for the Golden Globe Award for Best Original Song at the 73rd Golden Globe Awards. He produced the song "Slow Motion" for Trey Songz and has arranged sessions with Jason Derulo and Lil Wayne.

Puth starred as Meghan Trainor's love interest in the music video for her song "Dear Future Husband", released in March 2015. In the video, she meets Puth on an online dating service and he comes to Trainor's home with a carryout pizza, which succeeds in impressing her. On May 1, 2015, Puth released a five-song extended play, Some Type of Love. In June 2015, he released the promotional single "Nothing but Trouble" with Lil Wayne, from the soundtrack to the documentary 808: The Movie. During 2015, Puth worked on several albums of other artists. He co-wrote and produced the "Broke" and "Pull Up" for Jason Derulo's album Everything Is 4, co-wrote "Bombastic" with Bonnie McKee from the album of the same title, and produced "Working Class Heroes (Work)" on CeeLo Green's album Heart Blanche.

Pre-orders for Puth's first full-length album Nine Track Mind began on August 20, 2015, along with the second single "One Call Away". The song peaked at number 12 in the United States, 26 in the United Kingdom and 4 in Australia. By June 2017 the song had sold 1,575,475 copies domestically. Puth released a remix for the song, entitled "One Call Away (Coast to Coast Mix)", featuring the Americans Tyga, Ty Dolla Sign and Brett Eldredge and the Mexican singer Sofia Reyes.

His first full-length album, Nine Track Mind, was released on January 29, 2016. The album debuted at number 3 in the United Kingdom. It peaked at number 6 on the Billboard 200. It also received a score of 37 out of 100 on Metacritic, becoming the 15th worst-reviewed album on the site. Puth embarked on his first concert tour, the Nine Track Mind Tour, in March 2016. In 2016, Puth was the first musician to sign a deal with Deutsch Music, a subsidiary of Deutsch Inc.

=== 2017–2021: Voicenotes and singles ===
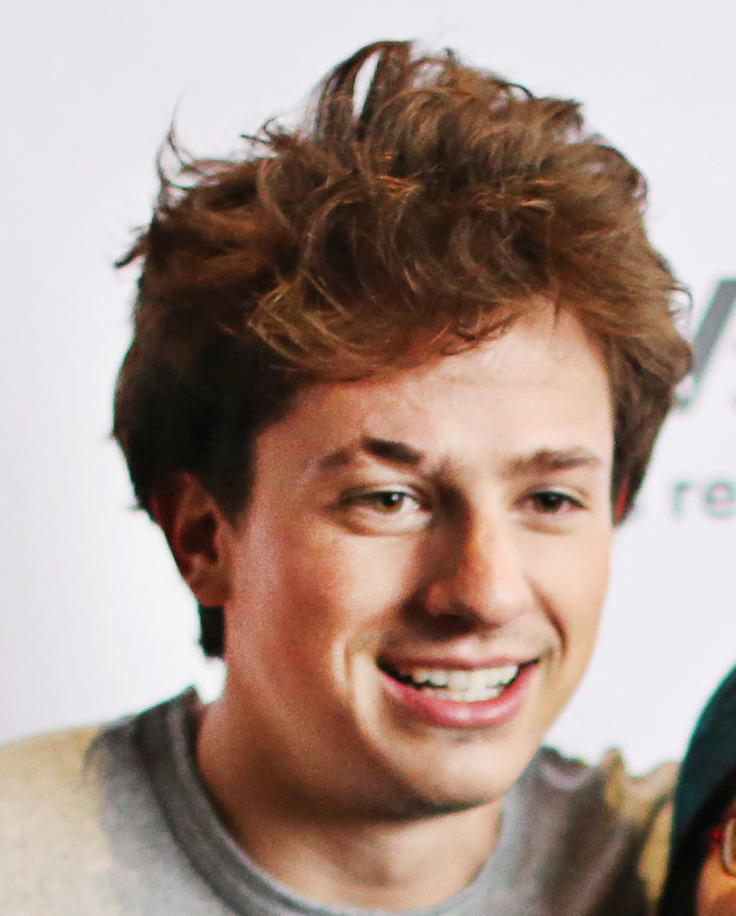
Puth at an LG event in 2017

On April 21, 2017, Puth released "Attention", the lead single from his second studio album Voicenotes. The song peaked at number 5 on the Billboard Hot 100, becoming his highest-charting single as a solo artist. The second single, "How Long", was released on October 5, 2017, and peaked at number 21 on the Billboard Hot 100. Puth also collaborated with One Direction's Liam Payne on the single "Bedroom Floor", for which provided background vocals and co-produced. In 2018, he was featured on G-Eazy's single "Sober". On January 4, 2018, Puth released a promotional single from Voicenotes, "If You Leave Me Now" featuring Boyz II Men. Puth also announced that he would be pushing the release date back four months to May 11, 2018.

On March 15, 2018, "Done for Me" was released as the third single from Voicenotes. The song features singer Kehlani. The song also peaked at number 53 on the Billboard Hot 100. On March 25, 2018, Puth released the fourth single "Change" featuring James Taylor. A day earlier, Puth sang the song at the March for Our Lives event in Los Angeles. The album also features the songs "The Way I Am", the fifth single off the album. Voicenotes was released on May 11, 2018, to generally positive reviews from critics; it debuted and peaked at number 4 on the US Billboard 200 with 58,000 album-equivalent units, of which 39,000 were pure album sales. Puth embarked on the Voicenotes Tour in 2018, with Hailee Steinfeld as a special guest.

In August 2019, Puth released "I Warned Myself"; another single, "Mother", was released in September, and a third, "Cheating on You", in October. In early 2020, Puth announced that he had scrapped what he had written for his third studio album; he remarked in 2022 that he "didn't really like any of the music" he released in 2019, and that he "felt like [he] was kind of pretending to be a cool guy".

However, he still worked on music in 2020. He contributed keyboard to four tracks on the Ozzy Osbourne album Ordinary Man, released on February 21, 2020. He featured on the Lennon Stella song "Summer Feelings" for the soundtrack of the Warner Bros. Pictures animated film Scoob! He released "Girlfriend" in June, contributed "Free" to the soundtrack of the Disney+ film The One and Only Ivan the same month, and released "Hard on Yourself", featuring Blackbear, in August. Finally, he featured on two remixes at the end of the year, first of the Jvke song "Upside Down" in October and then of the Sasha Alex Sloan song "Is It Just Me?" in November.

On July 9, 2021, the Kid Laroi and Justin Bieber released the single "Stay", the lead single of Laroi's mixtape F*ck Love 3+: Over You, which was co-written and co-produced by Puth. The song reached number 1 on the Billboard Hot 100, becoming Laroi's first single, Bieber's eighth single, and Puth's first non-performing production to top the chart. Puth released "After All" with Elton John as part of John's album The Lockdown Sessions.

=== 2022–present: Charlie and Whatever's Clever! ===
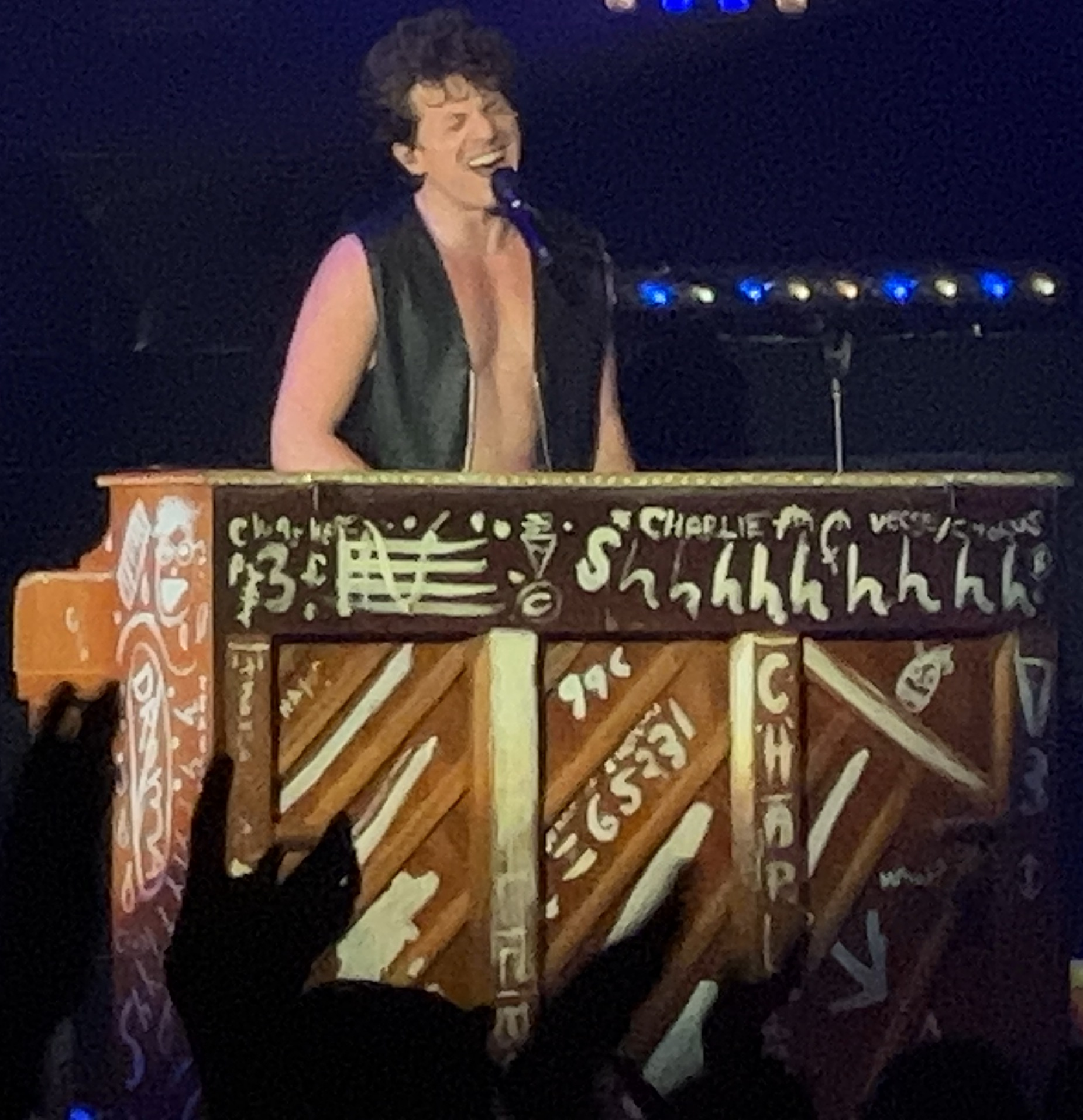
Puth performing live in June 2023

In September 2021, he started documenting on TikTok a process of "combin[ing] a seemingly random bunch of thoughts and noises made with different objects into a pop song", which went viral on the platform; this led to the release of "Light Switch" on January 20, 2022, as the first single from his third studio album, Charlie. This was followed by "That's Hilarious" in April and "Left and Right" featuring Jungkook in June. On July 7, Puth revealed Charlie's cover art and its release date. "Smells Like Me", "I Don't Think That I Like Her", and "Charlie Be Quiet!" were all released in September. Charlie was released on October 7 along with a music video for its song "Loser".

On October 21, 2022, Puth was featured alongside Shenseea on Calvin Harris's single "Obsessed" from Harris' sixth album Funk Wav Bounces Vol. 2. On March 31, 2023, Puth released the single "That's Not How This Works", with music duo Dan + Shay. On April 14, 2023, Puth released a remix of "That's Not How This Works" which added Sabrina Carpenter as a featured artist alongside Dan + Shay. On June 15, 2023, Puth featured on "Angel Pt. 2" alongside South Korean singer Jimin and American singers Jvke and Muni Long, which was a continuation of "Angel Pt. 1" released for the Fast X soundtrack. On August 18, 2023, Puth released "Lipstick", which was originally intended as the lead single from his fourth album. He also featured on Stray Kids' single "Lose My Breath", which was released on May 10, 2024.

On October 4, 2024, The Charlie Puth Show began streaming on Roku. A faux-reality series following Puth, it co-starred Corporate Natalie as his manager and Ruby Karp as his assistant. It also featured drop-ins from Will Ferrell, John Legend, "Weird Al" Yankovic, Wiz Khalifia and other stars. Puth was referenced by Taylor Swift in her 2024 song "The Tortured Poets Department", in which she sings, "We declared Charlie Puth should be a bigger artist," attracting media attention. Encouraged by this shoutout, Puth released the single "Hero" on May 24 of that year. On November 8, 2024, he released a Christmas song titled "December 25th". Puth was slated to participate in the ninth season of Singer, a Chinese competition show for professional singers, in June 2024. However, his appearance was canceled following backlash over his pro-Israel stance on X. He deleted his X account the same month. Puth made his debut on the show during its tenth season on May 30, 2025.

In September 2025, Puth played a series of concerts at the Blue Note Jazz Club in New York City, with further shows planned in October at the Los Angeles location. On October 16, 2025, Puth announced that his fourth studio album, Whatever's Clever!, would be released on March 27, 2026. The announcement was accompanied by the release of the album's lead single, "Changes". On January 16, 2026, he released "Beat Yourself Up", the second single from Whatever's Clever! On February 8, 2026, Puth performed the national anthem for Super Bowl LX. In March 2026, Puth joined AI music company Moises as a "Chief Music Officer". The third single from Whatever's Clever, titled "Home" which features Japanese singer Hikaru Utada, was released on March 9, 2026.

== Personal life ==
Growing up, Puth was bullied at school. He said, "They would team up against me so bad and they would kick me in a place that wouldn't feel fantastic and I would need to throw up and they would then say I was pretending to throw up." In 2018, he said he had a nervous breakdown from "just being overworked—and I'm in my head a lot and that, in combination with jetlag and, you know, the self-realization that I am getting more famous and my privacy goes out the window pretty much every day—it's just not what I'm used to, and I don't think I'm ever going to be used to it, and my therapy is to just put melody to it and sing it."

In 2022, Puth began dating family friend Brooke Sansone. The couple got engaged on September 7, 2023, and they married one year later, on September 7, 2024. On October 16, 2025, he announced that his wife was pregnant with their first child together. He shared the news in a clip from the music video for his song "Changes". She gave birth to a son named Jude on March 13, 2026.

== Discography ==
- Nine Track Mind (2016)
- Voicenotes (2018)
- Charlie (2022)
- Whatever's Clever! (2026)

== Filmography ==
Film
Year	Title	Role	Notes
2023	That's Not How This Works	Charlie	Short film

Television
Year	Title	Role	Notes
2016	Undateable	Himself	Episode: "A New Year's Resolution Walks Into a Bar"
2016, 2019, 2022	The Voice	Advisor / Mentor assistant	Season 11 for Team Alicia; Season 16 for Team Adam; Season 22 for Team Camila
2017	Life in Pieces	Himself	Episode: "Facebook Fish Planner Backstage"
2017	Drop the Mic	Himself	Episode: "Nicole Scherzinger vs. Lil Rel Howery / Charlie Puth vs. Backstreet Boys"
2019	Songland	Himself	Episode: "Charlie Puth"
2020	One World: Together at Home	Himself	Television special
2020	#KidsTogether: The Nickelodeon Town Hall	Himself	Television special
2024	The Charlie Puth Show	Himself	Mockumentary series on The Roku Channel

Web
Year	Title	Role	Ref.
2009–2013	Charlies Vlogs	Himself	
2011	Can You Sing?	Contestant	
2018	Sugar	Himself	Episode: "Charlie Puth gives a pop up performance for fan on her 17th birthday"

== Awards and nominations ==
Name of the award ceremony, year presented, category, nominee(s) of the award, and the result of the nomination
Award ceremony	Year	Category	Nominee(s)/work(s)	Result	Ref.
American Music Awards	2015	Collaboration of the Year	"See You Again"	Nominated	
American Music Awards	2015	Song of the Year	"See You Again"	Nominated	
Billboard Music Awards	2016	Top Hot 100 Song	"See You Again"	Won	
Billboard Music Awards	2016	Top Rap Song	"See You Again"	Won	
Billboard Music Awards	2016	Top New Artist	Himself	Nominated	
Billboard Music Awards	2016	Top Radio Song	"See You Again"	Nominated	
Billboard Music Awards	2016	Top Selling Song	"See You Again"	Nominated	
Billboard Music Awards	2016	Top Streaming Song (Video)	"See You Again"	Nominated	
Billboard Music Awards	2018	Top Radio Song	"Attention"	Nominated	
Billboard Music Awards	2018	Top Radio Songs Artist	Himself	Nominated	
Billboard Music Awards	2021	Top Collaboration	"I Hope" (Note: shared with Gabby Barrett)	Won	
Billboard Music Awards	2021	Top Hot 100 Song	"I Hope"	Nominated	
Billboard Music Awards	2021	Top Selling Song	"I Hope"	Nominated	
Billboard Music Awards	2021	Top Radio Song	"I Hope"	Nominated	
Critics' Choice Movie Awards	2016	Best Song	"See You Again"	Won	
E! People's Choice Awards	2022	The Collaboration Song of 2022	"Left and Right" (Note: shared with Jungkook)	Won	
E! People's Choice Awards	2022	The Male Artist of 2022	Himself	Nominated	
E! People's Choice Awards	2022	The Music Video of 2022	"Left and Right"	Nominated	
E! People's Choice Awards	2022	The Social Celebrity of 2022	Himself	Nominated	
Gaon Chart Music Awards	2017	International Rising Star of the Year	Himself	Won	
MBC Plus X Genie Music Awards	2018	Best International Artist	Himself	Won	
Golden Globe Awards	2016	Best Original Song	"See You Again" (Note: shared with Justin Franks, Andrew Cedar, and Cameron Thomaz)	Nominated	
Grammy Awards	2016	Song of the Year	"See You Again"	Nominated	
Grammy Awards	2016	Best Pop Duo/Group Performance	"See You Again"	Nominated	
Grammy Awards	2016	Best Song Written for Visual Media	"See You Again"	Nominated	
Grammy Awards	2019	Best Engineered Album, Non-Classical	Voicenotes	Nominated	
Grammy Awards	2027	Best Traditional Pop Vocal Album	Whatever's Clever!	Pending	
Hollywood Music in Media Awards	2015	Song – Feature Film	"See You Again"	Won	
iHeartRadio Titanium Awards	2017	1 Billion Total Audience Spins on iHeartRadio Stations	"Attention"	Won	
iHeartRadio Titanium Awards	2020	1 Billion Total Audience Spins on iHeartRadio Stations	"I Hope"	Won	
iHeartRadio Music Awards	2016	Best Collaboration	"See You Again"	Nominated	
iHeartRadio Music Awards	2016	Best Lyrics	"See You Again"	Nominated	
iHeartRadio Music Awards	2016	Best Song from a Movie	"See You Again"	Nominated	
iHeartRadio Music Awards	2021	Best Collaboration	"I Hope"	Nominated	
iHeartRadio Music Awards	2021	Best Lyrics	"I Hope"	Nominated	
iHeartRadio Music Awards	2023	Best Music Video	"Left and Right"	Nominated	
Japan Gold Disc Awards	2023	Song of the Year by Streaming – Western	"Left and Right"	Won	
Joox Thailand Music Awards	2017	International Artist of the Year	Himself	Won	
Melon Music Awards	2022	Best Pop Artist	Himself	Won	
MTV Europe Music Awards	2015	Best Song	"See You Again"	Nominated	
MTV Europe Music Awards	2015	Best Collaboration	"See You Again"	Nominated	
MTV Europe Music Awards	2016	Best Push Act	Himself	Nominated	
MTV Video Music Awards	2017	Best Collaboration	"We Don't Talk Anymore" (Note: shared with Selena Gomez)	Nominated	
Nickelodeon Kids' Choice Awards	2016	Favorite Collaboration	"See You Again"	Won	
Radio Disney Music Awards	2016	Breakout Artist of the Year	Himself	Nominated	
Radio Disney Music Awards	2016	Best Crush Song	"One Call Away"	Nominated	
Teen Choice Awards	2015	Choice Music: R&B/Hip-Hop Song	"See You Again"	Won	
Teen Choice Awards	2015	Choice Music: Song from a Movie or TV Show	"See You Again"	Won	
Teen Choice Awards	2015	Choice Music: Collaboration	"See You Again"	Nominated	
Teen Choice Awards	2016	Choice Music: Breakout Artist	Himself	Nominated	
Teen Choice Awards	2016	Choice Music: Break-Up Song	"We Don't Talk Anymore"	Nominated	
Teen Choice Awards	2016	Choice Music: Male Artist	Himself	Nominated	
Teen Choice Awards	2016	Choice Music Single: Male	"One Call Away"	Nominated	
Teen Choice Awards	2018	Choice Song: Male Artist	"Attention"	Nominated	
Teen Choice Awards	2018	Choice Summer Male Artist	Himself	Nominated	
Teen Choice Awards	2018	Choice Summer Tour	The Voicenotes Tour	Nominated	
Telehit Awards	2016	Male Soloist of the Year	Himself	Nominated	
Telehit Awards	2017	Male Soloist of the Year	Himself	Nominated	

== Tours and residencies ==
Headlining

- Nine Track Mind Tour (2016)
- Don't Talk Tour (2016)
- Voicenotes Tour (2018)
- One Night Only Tour (2022)
- Charlie the Live Experience (2023)
- Something New (2024)
- Whatever's Clever! World Tour (2026)

Residencies

- Whatever's Clever (2025)

Supporting

- Illuminate World Tour (Shawn Mendes) (2017)

== See also ==
- List of artists who reached number one in the United States
