= If You Leave Me Now (Charlie Puth song) =

Promotional single by Charlie Puth featuring Boyz II Men

from the album Voicenotes
- Released: January 5, 2018
- Genre: R&B
- Length: 4:02
- Label: Atlantic
- Songwriters: Charlie Puth; Tobias Jesso Jr.; Robin Wiley
- Producer: Charlie Puth

"If You Leave Me Now" is a song by American singer-songwriter Charlie Puth, featuring American vocal group Boyz II Men. It was released via Atlantic Records on January 5, 2018, as the first promotional single from Puth's second studio album, Voicenotes (2018). An a cappella song, it interpolates "I Thought She Knew" by NSYNC from their 2000 album No Strings Attached. While the song is not a cover of Chicago's 1976 hit single, Puth recognizes the eponymous song's legacy by including the line "You will take the biggest part of me," which is featured prominently in the predecessor song's lyrics. Boyz II Men recorded a cover of the Chicago song in 2009.

== Background ==
Puth detailed on Twitter that this song serves as a consolation for his pushing back of the album's release. "So I have good news and bad news. The bad news is that I have to push the album release date. I'm producing this album all myself and with that comes a lot of work, and in my opinion, the album is not perfect yet. However, it will still come out this year, and soon. But to make it up to all of you, here's the good news. I'm putting out a song I did with Boyz II Men tomorrow. And it's probably one of my favorite songs I've ever written. Love you guys and thank you for understanding," Puth wrote on Twitter a day before the song's release. Boyz II Men celebrated the collaboration on social media by writing: "Had a great time working with [Puth] on this record. Pure talent."

== Composition ==
It is in the key of D Major with a key change to E Major after the bridge.

== Critical reception ==
Taylor Weatherby of Billboard praised the song, calling it a showcase of "Puth's impressive falsetto and power-note abilities". She also like the song's feature of "another '90s classic in addition to Boyz II Men: A good old-fashioned key change". Madison Vain of Entertainment Weekly opined that the song is "remarkably understated in its production", calling it "Puth's most straightforward R&B cut to date". She found Boyz II Men "lending their honeyed harmonies to the song", along with "a few delightful standout lead moments". Hugh McIntyre of Fuse wrote that the song is distinct from Puth's previous productions. He felt the song "surprisingly mature" and "shows some serious growth on Puth's part". Sydney Gore of MTV News regarded it as "an uplifting song" and "a polished a cappella ballad", noting that "it will really tug at your heart strings" with Boyz II Men on board. Lucas Villa of AXS wrote that the song "harks back to a time of doo-wop with finger snaps and sweet harmonies courtesy of Puth and Boyz II Men".

== Charts ==
Chart (2018)	Peak position
New Zealand Heatseekers (RMNZ)	10
Sweden Heatseeker (Sverigetopplistan)	13
