= Cheating on You =

2019 song by Charlie Puth

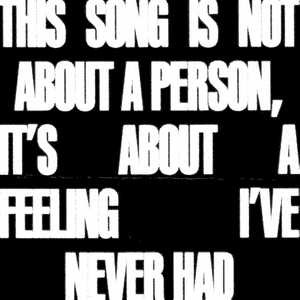

Single by Charlie Puth
- Released: October 2, 2019
- Genre: Blue-eyed soul; Contemporary R&B
- Length: 3:16
- Label: Artist Partner Group
- Songwriters: Charlie Puth; Jacob Kasher Hindlin
- Producer: Charlie Puth

Charlie Puth singles chronology
"Mother" (2019)	"Cheating on You" (2019)	"I Hope" (2019)

"Cheating on You" is a song by American singer-songwriter Charlie Puth. It was released on October 2, 2019. The song was written by Puth and Jacob Kasher.

== Background ==
Before he released the song, Puth said on his Twitter account, "The final song out of this trilogy is called Cheating On You...and I promise the song doesn't sound as the title suggests."

== Music video ==
A music video to accompany the release of "Cheating on You" was first released onto YouTube on October 1, 2019. The video was directed by Tyler Yee. At the start of the video it shows a message that reads, "This song is not about a person. It's about a feeling I've never had." The video was filmed in New York City.

== Track listing ==
Digital download
No.	Title	Length
1.	"Cheating on You"	3:16

== Charts ==
=== Weekly charts ===
Weekly chart performance for "Cheating on You"
Chart (2019–2022)	Peak position
New Zealand Hot Singles (RMNZ)	23
Singapore (RIAS)	22
Vietnam (Vietnam Hot 100)	69

=== Year-end charts ===
Year-end chart performance for "Cheating on You"
Chart (2022)	Position
Vietnam (Vietnam Hot 100)	89

== Release history ==
Country	Date	Format	Label
Various	October 2, 2019	Digital download; streaming	Artist Partner
United States	October 1, 2019	Hot Modern AC	Atlantic
United States	October 11, 2019	Contemporary hit radio	Atlantic
