= Lipstick (Charlie Puth song) =

2023 single by Charlie Puth

Single by Charlie Puth
- Released: August 18, 2023
- Length: 3:28
- Label: Atlantic
- Songwriters: Charlie Puth; Jacob Kasher Hindlin; Nathan Perez; Andrew Wansel
- Producers: Charlie Puth; Happy Perez; Pop Wansel

Charlie Puth singles chronology
"Angel Pt. 2" (2023)	"Lipstick" (2023)	"Lose My Breath" (2024)

Music video
- "Lipstick" on YouTube

"Lipstick" is a song by American singer-songwriter Charlie Puth, released by Atlantic Records on August 18, 2023. Puth wrote it with songwriter Jacob Kasher Hindlin and its producers, Happy Perez and Pop Wansel. It was originally intended to be the lead single from his fourth studio album.

== Background ==
Charlie Puth wrote the song "Lipstick" with Jacob Kasher Hindlin, Nathan Perez, and Andrew Wansel. Atlantic Records released the song as the lead single from his upcoming fourth studio album on August 18, 2023. On the same day, Puth elaborated on its creation through social media:

In regards to the song I'm putting out tonight, it is the start of my new album. It's also one of my favorite mixes I've ever done. I think it's damn near perfect…"

== Composition and lyrics ==
Puth produced, engineered, and programmed the song with Happy Perez and Pop Wansel and mixed it with Chris Galland and Manny Marroquin. Puth and Wansel play keyboards, and Perez plays guitar. Zach Pereyra mastered it.

In "Lipstick", Puth requests a person to place their lipstick on his body and neck. According to Billboard's Lars Brandle, the song "has an old-school groove, over which he sings, 'Come and put your lipstick on my neck and my body/Just to show these bitches that you're mine/ Lipstick on my collar show 'em you ain't no hobby/ You're the one who gets it all the time." In its first verse, Puth announces his intentions to commit to the relationship, meet his partner's parents, and make the relationship public.

== Reception ==
iHeartRadio's Rebekah Gonzalez described the music video as "sultry", and Rolling Stone's Emily Zemler called it "an intimate music video that zooms in on Puth as he removes his shirt and blows smoke out of his mouth" and the song "sensual". Alex Gonzalez of Uproxx wrote: "Over a smooth, groovy beat produced alongside Pop Wansel and Happy Perez, Puth celebrates a cozy, special love, reminding the listeners whom he belongs to": "Baby, I think it's time we post a picture / Tell your momma and your sister you got a man".

== Credits and personnel ==
Credits are adapted from Qobuz

- Charlie Puth – producer, songwriter, programming, engineering, keyboards, mixing
- Happy Perez – producer, songwriter, programming, engineering, guitar
- Pop Wansel – producer, songwriter, programming, engineering, keyboards
- Jacob Kasher Hindlin – songwriter
- Zach Pereyra – mastering
- Chris Galland – mixing
- Manny Marroquin – mixing

== Charts ==
Chart performance for "Lipstick"
Chart (2023–2024)	Peak position
Czech Republic Airplay (ČNS IFPI)	17
Japan Hot Overseas (Billboard Japan)	8
New Zealand Hot Singles (RMNZ)	22
