= I Warned Myself =

2019 single by Charlie Puth

Single by Charlie Puth
- Released: August 21, 2019
- Genre: Pop
- Length: 2:39
- Label: Artist Partner; Atlantic
- Songwriters: Charlie Puth; Benjamin Levin
- Producers: Puth; Benny Blanco

Charlie Puth singles chronology
"Easier (Remix)" (2019)	"I Warned Myself" (2019)	"Mother" (2019)

Music video
- "I Warned Myself" on YouTube

"I Warned Myself" is a song by American singer-songwriter Charlie Puth. It was released through Artist Partner Group and Atlantic Records as a single on August 21, 2019. Puth produced the song with Benny Blanco and they wrote the song together.

== Background ==
On October 1, 2018, Puth announced that he was working on a new album. He first hinted at the title of the track on August 10, 2019 on his Instagram with the caption "i Warned Myself this would happen". A week later, he officially announced the release date and posted the cover art of the song. The song marks the first of three single releases. Puth revealed that the song is about "a vicious cycle of going back to someone continuously, knowing deep down that they aren't any good for you".

== Critical reception ==
Salvatore Maicki at The Fader thought the song had an "undeniably sticky hook" and noted the "sparse, rumbling production". Writing for Vulture, Hunter Harris pointed out the lyrical content to be "about love and loss, secrets and lies — basically a breakup" and questioned who the song could be about, with possibilities ranging from a fan to fellow singer Selena Gomez. Derrick Rossignol at Uproxx praised the song for being a "a dark and welcomed addition to the Billie Eilish-led pop landscape".

== Music video ==
The music video was released along with the song on August 21, 2019, and was directed by Brendan Vaughn. The video shows Puth being surrounded by a love interest in various settings and also includes scenes of the singer driving in a red Jaguar F-type coupe. Kirsten Spruch at Billboard noted that in the video "Puth serves up plenty of somber glances", while Sofiana Ramli of NME described the visuals as "hypnotizing".

== Charts ==
Chart (2019)	Peak position
Canada Hot 100 (Billboard)	91
Lithuania (AGATA)	34
Mexico Ingles Airplay (Billboard)	17
New Zealand Hot Singles (RMNZ)	18
Singapore (RIAS)	26
US Digital Song Sales (Billboard)	49
