= Voicenotes =

2018 studio album by Charlie Puth

- Digital and vinyl cover

Studio album by Charlie Puth
- Released: May 11, 2018
- Studios: A (Los Angeles, California); Charlie Puth's home (Los Angeles, California)
- Genres: Pop; R&B
- Length: 44:29
- Labels: Artist Partner; Atlantic
- Producers: Charlie Puth; Rickard Göransson

Charlie Puth chronology
| Nine Track Mind (2016) | Voicenotes (2018) | Charlie (2022) |

Alternative cover
- CD cover

Singles from Voicenotes
- 1. "Attention" Released: April 21, 2017; 2. "How Long" Released: October 5, 2017; 3. "Done for Me" Released: March 15, 2018; 4. "Change" Released: March 26, 2018; 5. "The Way I Am" Released: July 24, 2018

Voicenotes is the second studio album by American singer-songwriter Charlie Puth. Almost entirely produced by Puth himself, the album was released by Artist Partner Group and Atlantic Records on May 11, 2018. Five singles have been released from the album, including "Attention" and "How Long". "Attention" peaked at number 5 on the Billboard Hot 100 and "How Long" peaked at number 21.

Puth delayed the album from an early 2018 release date to "perfect" it, including reshooting the album cover. He announced on social media that he would release the album cover and the song "The Way I Am" on May 3. Puth embarked on the Voicenotes Tour in support of the album in North America throughout July and August 2018.

Upon release, the album was commercially successful, peaking at number 4 on the Billboard 200, and received widely positive reviews from critics, who praised the mature songwriting and Puth's performance; many felt it was an improvement upon Puth's debut album Nine Track Mind. The album received a nomination for the Grammy Award for Best Engineered Album, Non-Classical at the 61st Annual Grammy Awards.

== Music ==
Puth described the sound of the album as "like walking down a dirt road and listening to New Edition in 1989 – and being heartbroken, of course." He also remarked that he wanted a sound akin to the late 1980s "dark R&B" of Babyface, Jimmy Jam, Terry Lewis and Teddy Riley. Puth also stated the album will have no love ballads, explaining he wished to distance himself from the sound of his first album, which was "people nudging [me] in a direction that I didn't want to go in."

== Promotion ==
=== Singles ===
"Attention", released as the first single from the album on April 21, 2017, was met with commercial success, peaking at number 5 on the Billboard Hot 100. "How Long", released as the album's second single on October 5, 2017, peaked at number 21 on the Billboard Hot 100. "Done for Me", the third single, was released on March 15, 2018, and features Kehlani. "Change" featuring James Taylor was released as the fourth single on March 26, 2018. "The Way I Am" was released as the album's fifth single on July 24, 2018.

=== Promotional singles ===
"If You Leave Me Now", featuring Boyz II Men, was released as the album's first promotional single on January 5, 2018, after Puth delayed the album. "The Way I Am" was released as the second promotional single on May 3, 2018, along with the new album cover.

== Critical reception ==
Professional ratings
Aggregate scores
| Source | Rating |
|---|---|
| Metacritic | 67/100 |
Review scores
| Source | Rating |
| AllMusic | 3.5/5 stars |
| Newsday | 3/4 stars |
| NME | 3/5 stars |
| Rolling Stone | 3/5 stars |
| Us Weekly | 3/4 stars |

In contrast to Nine Track Mind, Voicenotes received generally positive reviews from critics. At Metacritic, which assigns a normalized rating out of 100 to reviews from mainstream publications, the album received an average score of 67 based on five reviews, indicating "generally favorable reviews". In a positive review of the album, Spencer Kornhaber of The Atlantic called Voicenotes a "guilty pleasure" and noted that Puth is not aiming for Ed Sheeran "everyguy relatability". Taylor Weatherby of Billboard named Voicenotes the album of the week, praising Puth's rawness, and the collaborations included on the album. Mark Kennedy of The Washington Post praised the album, calling it "perfect pop", and stating that Puth has a fantastic career in front of him. In another positive review of the album, Nicholas Hautman of Us Weekly called the album "perfect for the summer", and called it "perfectly crafted".

In a mixed review of the album, Brittany Spanos of Rolling Stone gave the album three out of five stars, saying "...while [Puth's] efforts on Voicenotes are valiant, he still has a bit more work to prove he can cut his teeth with the Justin Timberlakes and the Nick Jonases of that over-saturated world."

== Commercial performance ==
Voicenotes debuted at number 4 on the US Billboard 200 with 58,000 album-equivalent units of which 39,000 were pure album sales. On May 14, 2018, the album was certified Gold by the Recording Industry Association of America for combined sales and album-equivalent units of over 500,000 units in the United States.

In 2018, Voicenotes was ranked as the 130th most popular album of the year on the Billboard 200.

== Track listing ==
Credits adapted from liner notes

All tracks are produced by Charlie Puth, except where noted.

| No. | Title | Writer(s) | Length |
|---|---|---|---|
| 1. | "The Way I Am" | Charlie Puth; Jacob Kasher | 3:06 |
| 2. | "Attention" | Puth; Kasher | 3:31 |
| 3. | "LA Girls" (producers: Puth, Evigan^{[b]}) | Puth; Kasher; Jason Evigan; Sean Douglas | 3:17 |
| 4. | "How Long" | Puth; Kasher; Justin Franks | 3:20 |
| 5. | "Done for Me" (featuring Kehlani) | Puth; Kehlani Parrish; Kasher; John Ryan | 3:00 |
| 6. | "Patient" | Puth; Kasher; Benjamin Johnson; Fraser Churchill | 3:10 |
| 7. | "If You Leave Me Now" (featuring Boyz II Men) | Puth; Tobias Jesso Jr.; Robin Wiley | 4:03 |
| 8. | "Boy" | Puth; Kasher | 4:23 |
| 9. | "Slow It Down" | Puth; Kasher; Rami Yacoub; Carl Falk; Daryl Hall; John Oates; Sara Allen | 3:10 |
| 10. | "Change" (featuring James Taylor; producers: Puth, Carlsson^{[a]}) | Puth; Taylor; Johan Carlsson; Ross Golan | 3:37 |
| 11. | "Somebody Told Me" (producers: Puth, Carlsson^{[a]}) | Puth; Kasher; Carlsson | 3:36 |
| 12. | "Empty Cups" (producers: Puth, Göransson) | Puth; Kasher; Savan Kotecha; Rickard Göransson; James Alan Ghaleb | 2:50 |
| 13. | "Through It All" | Puth; Kasher; Breyan Isaac | 3:26 |
| Total length: | | | 44:29 |

Notes

- ^{^[a]} signifies a co-producer
- ^{^[b]} signifies an additional producer
- "Boy" is stylized in all uppercase

Sample credits

- "If You Leave Me Now" contains an interpolation of "I Thought She Knew" by NSYNC
- "Slow It Down" contains an interpolation of "I Can't Go for That (No Can Do)" by Hall & Oates

== Personnel ==
Credits adapted from liner notes.

Musicians

- Charlie Puth – vocals, bass (track 2), instruments (tracks 5, 8–10, 13)
- Kehlani – featured vocals (track 5)
- Boyz II Men – featured vocals (track 7)
- James Taylor – featured vocals (track 10)
- Jan Ozveren – guitar (tracks 1–4, 6, 11)
- Dmitry Gorodetsky – bass (track 4)
- Carl Falk – bass (track 9)
- Johan Carlsson – instruments (track 10)

Production

- Charlie Puth – production (all tracks)
- Rickard Göransson – production (track 12)
- Jason Evigan – additional production (track 3)
- Johan Carlsson – co-production (tracks 10, 11)

Technical personnel

- Charlie Puth – recording (tracks 1–6, 8–13), mixing
- Ryan Gladieux – Kehlani vocals recording (track 5)
- Manny Marroquin – mixing
- Chris Galland – mixing assistance
- Jeff Jackson – mixing assistance
- Dave Kutch – mastering
- Carolyn Tracey – project manager

Artwork

- Alex R. Kirzhner – design
- Jimmy Fontaine – photography
- Billy Walsh – styling
- Michael Kanyon – grooming
- Madison Blue – grooming

== Charts ==
=== Weekly charts ===
Weekly chart performance for Voicenotes
| Chart (2018) | Peak position |
|---|---|
| Australian Albums (ARIA) | 7 |
| Austrian Albums (Ö3 Austria) | 19 |
| Belgian Albums (Ultratop Flanders) | 19 |
| Belgian Albums (Ultratop Wallonia) | 9 |
| Canadian Albums (Billboard) | 5 |
| Czech Albums (ČNS IFPI) | 10 |
| Dutch Albums (Album Top 100) | 13 |
| Finnish Albums (Suomen virallinen lista) | 30 |
| French Albums (SNEP) | 3 |
| German Albums (Offizielle Top 100) | 14 |
| Irish Albums (IRMA) | 12 |
| Italian Albums (FIMI) | 12 |
| Japanese Hot Albums (Billboard Japan) | 5 |
| Japanese Physical Albums (Oricon) | 10 |
| New Zealand Albums (RMNZ) | 6 |
| Norwegian Albums (VG-lista) | 19 |
| Polish Albums (ZPAV) | 43 |
| Portuguese Albums (AFP) | 12 |
| Scottish Albums (Official Charts) | 4 |
| Slovak Albums (ČNS IFPI) | 12 |
| South Korean Albums (Gaon) | 27 |
| Spanish Albums (Promusicae) | 6 |
| Swedish Albums (Sverigetopplistan) | 18 |
| Swiss Albums (Schweizer Hitparade) | 4 |
| UK Albums (Official Charts) | 4 |
| US Billboard 200 | 4 |

=== Year-end charts ===
2018 year-end chart performance for Voicenotes
| Chart (2018) | Position |
|---|---|
| Belgian Albums (Ultratop Flanders) | 175 |
| French Albums (SNEP) | 184 |
| South Korean International Albums (Gaon) | 12 |
| US Billboard 200 | 130 |

== Certifications and sales ==
Certifications and sales for Voicenotes
| Region | Certification | Certified units/sales |
|---|---|---|
| Canada (Music Canada) | 4× Platinum | 320,000^{‡} |
| France (SNEP) | Gold | 50,000^{‡} |
| Italy (FIMI) | Gold | 25,000^{‡} |
| Mexico (AMPROFON) | Gold | 30,000^{‡} |
| New Zealand (RMNZ) | Platinum | 15,000^{‡} |
| Poland (ZPAV) | Gold | 10,000^{‡} |
| Singapore (RIAS) | 2× Platinum | 20,000^{*} |
| United Kingdom (BPI) | Gold | 100,000^{‡} |
| United States (RIAA) | Platinum | 1,000,000^{‡} |
^{*} Sales figures based on certification alone.^{‡} Sales+streaming figures based on certification alone.
