= Done for Me =

Single by Charlie Puth featuring Kehlani

from the album Voicenotes
- Released: March 15, 2018
- Genre: Pop; neo soul
- Length: 3:00
- Label: Atlantic
- Songwriters: Charlie Puth; Kehlani Ashley Parrish; Jacob Kasher; John Ryan
- Producer: Charlie Puth

Charlie Puth singles chronology
"Sober" (2017)	"Done for Me" (2018)	"Change" (2018)

Kehlani singles chronology
"Faking It" (2017)	"Done for Me" (2018)	"Nowhere Fast" (2018)

Music video
- "Done for Me" on YouTube

"Done for Me" is a song by American singer-songwriter Charlie Puth, featuring guest vocals from American singer Kehlani. Written by its performers with Jacob Kasher, John Ryan and produced by Puth, it was released by Atlantic Records on March 15, 2018, as the third single from Puth's second studio album, Voicenotes (2018).

== Background ==
The artists first teased the duet a day before its release, with a black-and-white photo of the two, which was captioned with the release date. The song premiered on Beats 1, where Puth revealed to host Zane Lowe about collaborating with Kehlani: "You know when you meet somebody and you just know that you're going to be friends with them for a really really long time? That was [them] when I met [them]. [They]'re just such a warm and outgoing person and just such a good distinct voice." He also added that they have been "looking forward to doing something together" ever since they covered "Hotline Bling" in 2015. "I made this record...I produced this after an unsuccessful party in L.A., which is what all these records are based off of [sic] on my album. But I just went home played these, I have my little Juno keyboard over there that I had. I had gotten it that night and I just hit one of these settings here and just played a B-minor cord and it just made me think of Wham!, it made me think of 1988, and I put that chord down and I immediately thought of Kehlani too," he said of the recording process.

== Composition ==
"Done for Me" is a pop and neo soul ballad that features a "liquid", "electronic" bass line, "a couple synth horns and some vaguely stoney reverb", as well as a "dejected, inward-looking vibe" and "warm synthesizers reminiscent of classic '80s pop". According to Puth, there are "no pop chords in the song but it's a pop song", and it draws inspiration from '80s English musical duo Wham!

== Critical reception ==
"Done for Me" was well received by music critics. Hugh McIntyre of Forbes deemed the song "a slightly soulful, but still primarily poppy affair", writing that "it fits in perfectly with what Puth has been doling out during this era". He noticed the song's funk influences, praising Puth for "relying primarily on his own talent to deliver some of the best pop created with actual instruments (as opposed to utilizing solely computers and studio wizardry) being released today", despite his ability to "partner with any top-tier producer in the business". Morgan Enos of Billboard described the song as "both classic-sounding in that big-board, Thriller vein of records and modern-seeming without adding too many 2010s signifiers". Mike Nied of Idolator praised the song, writing: "Boasting a danceable beat and enviable production, it is shaping up to be another surefire hit."

== Music video ==
The official music video was released on April 21, 2018, on YouTube.

== Track listing ==
Digital download
No.	Title	Length
1.	"Done for Me" (featuring Kehlani)	3:18

Digital download – James Hype Remix
No.	Title	Length
1.	"Done for Me" (featuring Kehlani) (James Hype Remix)	3:24

Digital download – Syn Cole Remix
No.	Title	Length
1.	"Done for Me" (featuring Kehlani) (Syn Cole Remix)	3:09

Digital download - Loud Luxury Remix
No.	Title	Length
1.	"Done for Me" (featuring Kehlani) (Loud Luxury Remix)	2:56

Digital download - No Sleep Remix
No.	Title	Length
1.	"Done for Me" (featuring Kehlani) (No Sleep Remix)	3:30

== Credits and personnel ==
Credits adapted from Qobuz.

- Charlie Puth – composition, production, programming, vocals, instruments
- Kehlani – composition, vocals
- Jacob Kasher – composition
- John Ryan – composition
- Ryan Gladieux – additional recording
- Engineer - Manny Marroquin
- Mastering Engineer - Dave Kutch

== Charts ==
=== Weekly charts ===
Chart (2018)	Peak position
Argentina Anglo (Monitor Latino)	8
Australia (ARIA)	97
Belgium (Ultratip Bubbling Under Flanders)	2
Belgium (Ultratop 50 Wallonia)	28
Canada Hot 100 (Billboard)	65
Canada AC (Billboard)	27
Canada CHR/Top 40 (Billboard)	29
Colombia (National-Report)	74
Croatia (HRT)	20
Czech Republic Airplay (ČNS IFPI)	51
Denmark Airplay (Tracklisten)	2
Ecuador (National-Report)	53
France (SNEP)	97
Germany (GfK)	100
Hungary (Rádiós Top 40)	39
Hungary (Single Top 40)	19
Ireland (IRMA)	75
Italy (FIMI)	87
Japan Hot 100 (Billboard)	59
Lebanon (Lebanese Top 20)	6
Mexico Airplay (Billboard)	18
Netherlands (Tipparade)	21
New Zealand Heatseekers (RMNZ)	6
Poland Dance (ZPAV)	47
Portugal (AFP)	81
Romania (Airplay 100)	43
Russia Airplay (Tophit)	96
Scottish Singles Sales (Official Charts)	25
Singapore (RIAS)	23
Slovakia Airplay (ČNS IFPI)	46
Slovakia Singles Digital (ČNS IFPI)	96
Slovenia (SloTop50)	36
South Korea International Digital (Gaon)	20
Sweden Heatseeker (Sverigetopplistan)	5
Switzerland (Schweizer Hitparade)	55
UK Singles (Official Charts)	45
US Billboard Hot 100	53
US Adult Contemporary (Billboard)	25
US Adult Pop Airplay (Billboard)	11
US Dance Airplay (Billboard)	29
US Pop Airplay (Billboard)	17
US Rhythmic Airplay (Billboard)	35
Venezuela (National-Report)	44

=== Year-end charts ===
Chart (2018)	Position
Iceland (Plötutíóindi)	69
US Adult Top 40 (Billboard)	39

== Certifications ==
Region	Certification	Certified units/sales
Australia (ARIA)	Platinum	70,000^{‡}
Canada (Music Canada)	Gold	40,000^{‡}
Italy (FIMI)	Gold	25,000^{‡}
Mexico (AMPROFON)	Platinum	60,000^{‡}
New Zealand (RMNZ)	Gold	15,000^{‡}
Poland (ZPAV)	Gold	25,000^{‡}
United Kingdom (BPI)	Silver	200,000^{‡}
United States (RIAA)	Platinum	1,000,000^{‡}
^{‡} Sales+streaming figures based on certification alone.

== Release history ==
Region	Date	Format	Version	Label	Ref.
Various	March 15, 2018	Digital download	Original	Atlantic	
Various	March 15, 2018	Digital download	James Hype Remix	Atlantic	
Various	March 15, 2018	Digital download	Syn Cole Remix	Atlantic	
Australia	March 16, 2018	Contemporary hit radio	Original	Warner Music Australia	
Italy	March 16, 2018	Contemporary hit radio	Original	Warner	
United States	April 10, 2018	Contemporary hit radio	Original	Atlantic	
France	May 25, 2018	Digital download	Loud Luxury Remix	Atlantic	
Various	May 25, 2018	Digital download	No Sleep Remix	Atlantic	
