= Change (Charlie Puth song) =

Single by Charlie Puth featuring James Taylor

from the album Voicenotes
- Written: 2017
- Released: March 26, 2018
- Recorded: January 2018
- Studio: Conway (Hollywood, California)
- Genre: Folk pop; soft rock
- Length: 3:35
- Label: Atlantic
- Songwriters: Charlie Puth; Johan Carlsson; Ross Golan
- Producers: Charlie Puth; Johan Carlsson

Charlie Puth singles chronology
| "Done for Me" (2018) | "Change" (2018) | "The Way I Am" (2018) |

James Taylor singles chronology
| "Montana" (2015) | "Change" (2018) |

"Change" is a song by American singer-songwriter Charlie Puth, featuring vocals from fellow American singer-songwriter James Taylor. and was released for digital download on March 26, 2018, as the fourth single from Puth's second studio album, Voicenotes. It debuted during his performance at March for Our Lives. Puth produced the song with Johan Carlsson and they wrote it alongside Ross Golan.

== Background ==
Puth first revealed the song in an interview with Zane Lowe on his Beats 1 radio show. "This song is called 'Change' and I'm actually gonna play it, they're doing March for Our Lives this Saturday downtown. I know nobody knows this song and James won't be there with me but I'm just gonna be on my piano. That's the right song [to play at the right moment] and I think people will understand when they hear it." Talking about how he got in touch with Taylor, Puth said that his friend Miles Beard set the collaboration up.

He stated on Twitter that the song is "dedicated to all of the Parkland students, any lives lost to senseless gun violence, and the world", alongside single cover, which features a dark blue backdrop. "It wasn't written for [March for Our Lives] specifically. I wrote it a year prior. I don't really know why I wrote it, but now I know why. It just happened to catch up a year late," Puth told Women's Wear Daily. He also opened up about the song during an Instagram live chat, saying: "It's about everybody, as humans we all help each other and that song came about through collaboration. This is the most important song I ever wrote."

Taylor admired Puth in a statement, saying: "Mr. Puth and I spent an excellent afternoon at Conway Studios in Hollywood this past January. It was a delight to work with such a gifted fellow musician and I'm so excited to finally see the release of the finished piece." Puth added: "Recording with James Taylor was a dream come true. He's the reason why I write music and it was an absolute honour to work with him."

== Composition ==
Described as a "smooth, acoustic-guitar driven tune", the folk pop and soft rock song consists of "light pop melodies" and "a loose, stripped-back guitar arrangement". Abby Jones of Billboard noted that "the soft, folksy ambience of the track is reminiscent of Taylor's signature sound, made famous in the '70s — however, the lyrics are very much 2018". As the song ends, it "evolves into this homage to 1990s rock and R&B, with heavy bass and rhythmic drums". Lyrically, the song urges people to change their attitudes in order to eliminate division and hatred.

== Critical reception ==
Scott Sterling of CBS Radio opined the two artists' "distinctive voices meshing beautifully over the warm track", writing that it is "far more reflective of classic James Taylor than anything on the current pop charts, and benefits mightily from the simple arrangement". Adreon Patterson of Paste complimented Taylor's ability to "create the ethereal mood the song evokes" with his "light baritone vocals", calling the song "a forgotten Taylor track from his '70s heyday".

== Live performances ==
On March 24, 2018, Puth premiered the song during his performance at March for Our Lives in Los Angeles. "There's such a theme of change happening," he introduced the song before performing it alone on the keyboard. "This song...you don't know it and it's totally fine. It just feels like the right song to perform right now." The live recording was later released as the official video, interspersed with footage from the event.

== Charts ==
Weekly chart performance for "Change"
| Chart (2018) | Peak position |
|---|---|
| Sweden Heatseeker (Sverigetopplistan) | 14 |
