= Attention (Charlie Puth song) =

2017 single by Charlie Puth

Single by Charlie Puth

from the album Voicenotes
- Released: April 21, 2017
- Studio: Charlie Puth's home studio (Los Angeles, California)
- Genre: Pop rock; soul; funk
- Length: 3:28
- Label: Artist Partner; Atlantic
- Songwriters: Charlie Puth; Jacob Kasher
- Producer: Charlie Puth

Charlie Puth singles chronology
"Dangerously" (2016)	"Attention" (2017)	"How Long" (2017)

Music video
- "Attention" on YouTube

"Attention" (Note: Stylized on the cover art as "ATTENT!ON".) is a song recorded and produced by the American singer-songwriter Charlie Puth for his second studio album Voicenotes (2018). It was written by Puth and Jacob Kasher. A midtempo pop rock track with elements of 1980s soft-soul and funk music, the song finds Puth singing about how he realizes his partner was "just want[ing] attention" from him instead of loving him. It was released digitally through Artist Partner Group and Atlantic Records on April 21, 2017, and later serviced to the radio on May 2, serving as the album's lead single. An accompanying music video was released on April 24, 2017, featuring Puth brooding at the club while scoping out his former partner, later returning home and finding the partner again at his apartment.

Upon its release, "Attention" received generally positive reviews from music critics for its "slick" and "groove-injected" production, further applauding the track as a more refined, mature and polished musical representation for Puth, compared to his previous releases. Commercially, the song was an international success and became Puth's signature song, reaching the top-ten in over twenty countries, including Australia, Belgium, Canada, Croatia, France, Germany, Hungary, Italy, Lebanon, Malaysia, New Zealand, the Philippines, Poland, Portugal, Romania, Slovakia, South Korea, Spain, Switzerland, the United Kingdom, and the United States, where it peaked at number 5 for three non-consecutive weeks. By this, the song became his highest and longest charting entry as a solo artist on the Billboard Hot 100 chart to date, as well as his third single to receive a 6× Platinum certification from the Recording Industry Association of America (RIAA), for achieving over six million certified units in the States.

To promote the song, Puth had his first live performance for "Attention" on The Voice on May 10, 2017, followed by performances on several shows, such as The Tonight Show Starring Jimmy Fallon, The Ellen DeGeneres Show, and The Late Late Show with James Corden. He later performed the song on his third headlining concert tour, titled Voicenotes Tour, throughout 2018.

== Background and release ==
The original idea of "Attention" began to develop in 2016 when Puth started to record bits of the song while he was on tour in Japan, by leaving a voicemail of the melody. Puth premiered the song in an "immersive music exhibit" in Los Angeles called "The Attention Room" on April 19. The pop-up installation features an LED "infinity tunnel" and is designed to replicate the brain's reaction to receiving attention. Two days later, "Attention" was officially released as the lead single of Puth's second studio album.

== Composition ==
"Attention" is a midtempo pop rock song that features elements of '80s soft-soul and funk. He also utilized the technique of Anti-Drop, where the chorus is minimalistic and hollow. Throughout the song, the singer realizes that his partner only wants to be around him for attention and other ulterior motives instead of loving him for who he is. It is performed in the key of E♭ minor with a tempo of 100 beats per minute. Puth's vocal span from B♭3 to C♭5.

== Critical reception ==
Writing for Idolator, Mike Wass suggested that "Attention" is a "Song of Summer contender". He added that Charlie "is still the boy next door, just a little more jaded and a lot more willing to speak his mind." Praising the song's production, he said that "That boldness also comes through on the production, which Charlie handled himself, chugging along with chunky bass and faint traces of disco." Lars Brandle of Billboard described it as "polished" and "groove-injected."

== Music video ==
The official music video was released on April 24, 2017, on YouTube. It was filmed in Hollywood Hills and directed by Emil Nava. Cameras capture Puth brooding at the club while scoping out a blond girl, played by Samara Weaving. Throughout the song, he realizes that she only wants to be around him for attention and other ulterior motives instead of loving him for who he is. The music video has over 1.8 billion views on YouTube as of August 2026.

== Promotion ==
The song has been used on its first day of release in a popular Snapchat filter. Puth performed "Attention" live for the first time on The Voice on May 10, 2017. He also performed it on The Tonight Show Starring Jimmy Fallon on May 18, 2017. He later performed the song on The Ellen DeGeneres Show on the October 10, 2017 episode, then on The Late Late Show with James Corden on October 11, 2017.

== Chart performance ==
"Attention" debuted at number 68 on the Billboard Hot 100 chart dated May 13, 2017. The single steadily climbed the charts throughout the summer, eventually entering the top ten at number ten on the chart date August 5, 2017, becoming Puth's third top ten single. The single eventually reached its peak of number five on the Hot 100 chart date August 26, 2017, becoming his highest-charting as a lead artist, and his first top five hit on the chart since "See You Again" in 2015. The single spent a total of 40 weeks on the chart and was ranked at number 22 for the Billboard Year-End Hot 100 chart for 2017.

On Billboard's Dance/Mix Show Airplay, "Attention" gave Puth his first number 1 on this chart as a solo artist in its September 2, 2017 issue, eclipsing "See You Again," which peaked at number 3 on this chart in 2015.

== Track listing ==
- Digital download
1. "Attention" – 3:31
- Digital download – Remix
1. "Attention" (Remix) featuring KYLE – 3:38
- Digital download – Acoustic
1. "Attention" (Acoustic) – 3:26
- Digital download – Bingo Players remix
1. "Attention" (Bingo Players remix) – 2:24
- Digital download – Oliver Heldens remix
1. "Attention" (Oliver Heldens remix) – 3:22
- Digital download – Lash remix
1. "Attention" (Lash remix) – 2:55
- Digital download – HUGEL remix
1. "Attention" (HUGEL remix) – 4:36
- Digital download – David Guetta remix
1. "Attention" (David Guetta Remix) – 4:41
- Spotify Singles
1. "Attention" (recorded at Spotify Studios NYC) – 3:42
2. "I Don't Wanna Know" (recorded at Spotify Studios NYC) – 3:35
- Remix EP "The Unreal Remixes"
1. "Attention" (Marie Wilhelmine Anders Remix) – 7:27
2. "Attention" (Einmeier Remix) – 4:27
3. "Attention" (Pyrococcus Remix) – 8:10

== Charts ==
=== Weekly charts ===
Chart (2017–2025)	Peak position
Argentina (Monitor Latino)	17
Australia (ARIA)	10
Austria (Ö3 Austria Top 40)	11
Belarus Airplay (Eurofest)	1
Belgium (Ultratop 50 Flanders)	15
Belgium (Ultratop 50 Wallonia)	2
Bulgaria Airplay (PROPHON)	2
Canada Hot 100 (Billboard)	6
CIS Airplay (TopHit)	1
Chile Anglo (Monitor Latino)	6
Colombia (National-Report)	48
Croatia International Airplay (Top lista)	6
Czech Republic Airplay (ČNS IFPI)	17
Czech Republic Singles Digital (ČNS IFPI)	13
Denmark (Tracklisten)	12
Ecuador (National-Report)	5
Euro Digital Songs (Billboard)	5
France (SNEP)	5
Germany (GfK)	9
Global 200 (Billboard)	158
Greece Digital (Billboard)	5
Hungary (Dance Top 40)	10
Hungary (Rádiós Top 40)	6
Hungary (Single Top 40)	5
Hungary (Stream Top 40)	4
Ireland (IRMA)	11
Israel International Airplay (Media Forest)	1
Italy (FIMI)	10
Italy Airplay (EarOne)	1
Latvia (Latvijas Top 40)	1
Latvia (DigiTop100)	84
Lebanon Airplay (Lebanese Top 20)	3
Luxembourg Digital (Billboard)	3
Malaysia (RIM)	2
Mexico (Monitor Latino)	10
Mexico Airplay (Billboard)	2
Moldova Airplay (TopHit)	66
Nigeria Airplay (Playdata charts)	6
Netherlands (Dutch Top 40)	11
Netherlands (Single Top 100)	20
New Zealand (Recorded Music NZ)	6
Norway (VG-lista)	13
Panama Anglo (Monitor Latino)	5
Philippines (Philippine Hot 100)	9
Poland Airplay (ZPAV)	3
Portugal (AFP)	3
Romania Airplay (Media Forest)	4
Russia Airplay (TopHit)	1
Scottish Singles Sales (Official Charts)	12
Serbia (Radiomonitor)	1
Slovakia Airplay (ČNS IFPI)	12
Slovakia Singles Digital (ČNS IFPI)	8
Slovenia (SloTop50)	13
South Korea International (Gaon)	9
Spain (Promusicae)	14
Sweden (Sverigetopplistan)	20
Switzerland (Schweizer Hitparade)	6
UK Singles (Official Charts)	9
Ukraine Airplay (Tophit)	1
Uruguay (Monitor Latino)	14
US Billboard Hot 100	5
US Adult Contemporary (Billboard)	6
US Adult Pop Airplay (Billboard)	1
US Dance Club Songs (Billboard)	38
US Dance Airplay (Billboard)	1
US Pop Airplay (Billboard)	1
US Radio Songs (Billboard)	1
US Rhythmic Airplay (Billboard)	9
Venezuela English (Record Report)	1
Vietnam (Vietnam Hot 100)	47

=== Year-end charts ===
Chart (2017)	Position
Argentina (Monitor Latino)	49
Australia (ARIA)	24
Austria (Ö3 Austria Top 40)	25
Belgium (Ultratop Flanders)	43
Belgium (Ultratop Wallonia)	10
Brazil (Pro-Música Brasil)	84
Canada (Canadian Hot 100)	20
CIS (Tophit)	5
Denmark (Tracklisten)	33
France (SNEP)	17
Germany (Official German Charts)	22
Hungary (Dance Top 40)	39
Hungary (Rádiós Top 40)	44
Hungary (Single Top 40)	26
Hungary (Stream Top 40)	10
Iceland (Tónlistinn)	29
Israel (Media Forest)	7
Italy (FIMI)	22
Latvia Airplay (LaIPA)	7
Netherlands (Dutch Top 40)	50
Netherlands (Single Top 100)	39
New Zealand (Recorded Music NZ)	33
Mexico (Monitor Latino)	18
Panama (Monitor Latino)	100
Poland (ZPAV)	11
Russia Airplay (Tophit)	7
Spain (PROMUSICAE)	38
Sweden (Sverigetopplistan)	36
Switzerland (Schweizer Hitparade)	29
Ukraine Airplay (Tophit)	33
UK Singles (Official Charts Company)	26
US Billboard Hot 100	22
US Adult Contemporary (Billboard)	28
US Adult Top 40 (Billboard)	9
US Mainstream Top 40 (Billboard)	6
US Radio Songs (Billboard)	14

Chart (2018)	Position
Hungary (Dance Top 40)	45
Hungary (Rádiós Top 40)	33
Hungary (Single Top 40)	90
US Adult Contemporary (Billboard)	12
US Radio Songs (Billboard)	58

Chart (2023)	Position
South Korea (Circle)	193

== Certifications ==
Region	Certification	Certified units/sales
Australia (ARIA)	7× Platinum	490,000^{‡}
Austria (IFPI Austria)	Gold	15,000^{‡}
Belgium (BRMA)	Platinum	20,000^{‡}
Canada (Music Canada)	Diamond	800,000^{‡}
Denmark (IFPI Danmark)	2× Platinum	180,000^{‡}
France (SNEP)	Diamond	233,333^{‡}
Germany (BVMI)	3× Gold	600,000^{‡}
Italy (FIMI)	4× Platinum	200,000^{‡}
Mexico (AMPROFON)	3× Platinum	180,000^{‡}
Netherlands (NVPI)	2× Platinum	80,000^{‡}
New Zealand (RMNZ)	5× Platinum	150,000^{‡}
Norway (IFPI Norway)	3× Platinum	180,000^{‡}
Poland (ZPAV)	Diamond	250,000^{‡}
Portugal (AFP)	3× Platinum	30,000^{‡}
South Korea	—	2,500,000
Spain (Promusicae)	3× Platinum	180,000^{‡}
Switzerland (IFPI Switzerland)	Platinum	20,000^{‡}
United Kingdom (BPI)	3× Platinum	1,800,000^{‡}
United States (RIAA)	6× Platinum	6,000,000^{‡}
Streaming
Japan (RIAJ)	Gold	50,000,000^{†}
^{‡} Sales+streaming figures based on certification alone.^{†} Streaming-only figures based on certification alone.

== Cover versions ==
South Korean singer Ken of the boy band VIXX recorded a cover of the song and uploaded it to his YouTube Channel on April 6, 2021

American musical collective Postmodern Jukebox have also covered the song, with American singer and former American Idol contestant Casey Abrams singing the lead vocals.

== Release history ==
Region	Date	Format	Version	Label	Ref.
Various	April 21, 2017	Digital download	Original	Atlantic	
Various	June 9, 2017	Digital download	Acoustic	Atlantic	
United States	June 16, 2017	Digital download	Bingo Players remix	Atlantic	
United States	June 29, 2017	Digital download	Oliver Heldens remix	Atlantic	
Italy	April 21, 2017	Contemporary hit radio	Original	Warner	
United States	May 2, 2017	Contemporary hit radio	Original	Atlantic	
United States	July 18, 2017	Rhythmic contemporary	Original	Atlantic	
Various	July 28, 2017	Digital download	Lash remix	Warner	
Various	July 28, 2017	Digital download	HUGEL remix	Warner	
Various	August 24, 2017	Digital download	David Guetta Remix	Warner	
Various	August 31, 2017	Digital download	Remix	Warner	
Various	November 5, 2021	Digital download	Marie Wilhelmine Anders Remix	Coccus	
Various	November 5, 2021	Digital download	Einmeier Remix	Coccus	
Various	November 5, 2021	Digital download	Pyrococcus Remix	Coccus	
