= How Long (Charlie Puth song) =

Single by Charlie Puth

from the album Voicenotes
- Released: October 5, 2017
- Genre: Pop-funk
- Length: 3:18
- Label: Atlantic
- Songwriters: Charlie Puth; Jacob Kasher; Justin Franks
- Producer: Charlie Puth

Charlie Puth singles chronology
"Attention" (2017)	"How Long" (2017)	"Sober" (2017)

Music video
- "How Long" on YouTube

"How Long" (Note: Stylised on the cover art as "HOW L?NG".) is a song recorded and produced by American singer-songwriter Charlie Puth. He wrote the song with Jacob Kasher and DJ Frank E. It was released on October 5, 2017, by Atlantic Records as the second single from Puth's second studio album, Voicenotes (2018). Commercially, it has reached the top 10 in Belgium, Israel, Lebanon, Malaysia, the Philippines, Scotland, and the United Kingdom as well as the top 20 in Australia, Belgium, Denmark, Ireland, the Netherlands, New Zealand, Slovakia, Spain, and Switzerland. The song peaked at number 21 on the US Billboard Hot 100.

== Background ==
Puth teased the song in September 2017 on social media. He tweeted two photos in a row, which were captioned "how" and "long" respectively. In October 2017, he posted photos and video clips with the captions, "has", "this", "been" and "going". On October 4, 2017, he posted a video of the voice note recording behind the song with the caption "on", eventually spelling out "how long has this been going on" altogether, as one of the lines in the song's lyrics.

== Composition ==
Sheet music for this song shows the key of C# minor with a tempo ranging from 108 to 112 beats per minute.

== Critical reception ==
Chris Malone of Billboard felt the song "opens with a slinky bassline 'Attention'", featuring a catchy chorus and representing "a slight stylistic shift from the more straight forward pop sound that filled his debut album Nine Track Mind", and that Puth took "the funkier R&B-leaning direction" with "How Long". James Dinh of iHeartRadio deemed it "a fitting follow-up to 'Attention' as the 25-year-old tackles yet another vulnerable narrative from the romance department", and expected it to enter the top 10 on the Billboard Hot 100. Mike Wass of Idolator wrote that the song "picks up where 'Attention' left off". He described the song as "instantly addictive and could well turn out to be an even bigger hit". Katrina Rees of CelebMix regarded the song as "Charlie's latest infectious offering", and wrote that it "has a slick yet fairly stripped back vibe which showcases the singer's vocal range".

== Chart performance ==
"How Long" reached the top 10 on seven charts, including the UK Singles Chart. It debuted at number 60 on the Billboard Hot 100 on the week of October 28, 2017. It eventually peaked at number 21, holding that position for five consecutive weeks. On April 3, 2018, the single was certified platinum by the Recording Industry Association of America (RIAA) for sales of a million digital copies in the United States.

== Music video ==
The official music video was released on October 19, 2017, on Charlie Puth's official YouTube channel. It features Puth dancing in the street, walking on walls and defying gravity.. The music video has over 712 million views as of October 2024.

== Live performances ==
Puth performed the song live for the first time on Sounds Like Friday Night on October 27, 2017. He later performed the song live on The Late Late Show with James Corden on November 29, 2017.

== Track listing ==
Digital download
No.	Title	Length
1.	"How Long"	3:18

Digital download - Remix
No.	Title	Length
1.	"How Long" (Remix) (featuring French Montana)	3:26

Digital download - Throttle Remix
No.	Title	Length
1.	"How Long" (Throttle Remix)	4:21

Digital download - Roisto Remix
No.	Title	Length
1.	"How Long" (Roisto Remix)	3:45

Digital download - EDX's Dubai Skyline Remix
No.	Title	Length
1.	"How Long" (EDX's Dubai Skyline Remix)	3:12
2.	"How Long" (EDX's Dubai Skyline Extended)	4:52

Digital download - Two Friends Remix
No.	Title	Length
1.	"How Long" (Two Friends Remix)	3:30

== Charts ==
=== Weekly charts ===
Chart (2017–2018)	Peak position
Argentina Anglo (Monitor Latino)	8
Australia (ARIA)	17
Austria (Ö3 Austria Top 40)	45
Belgium (Ultratop 50 Flanders)	19
Belgium (Ultratop 50 Wallonia)	9
Canada Hot 100 (Billboard)	24
Colombia (National-Report)	40
Czech Republic Airplay (ČNS IFPI)	15
Czech Republic Singles Digital (ČNS IFPI)	22
Denmark (Tracklisten)	17
Ecuador (National-Report)	70
Euro Digital Songs (Billboard)	10
France (SNEP)	54
France Downloads (SNEP)	22
Germany (GfK)	42
Hungary (Dance Top 40)	18
Hungary (Rádiós Top 40)	15
Hungary (Single Top 40)	19
Hungary (Stream Top 40)	12
Ireland (IRMA)	18
Israel International Airplay (Media Forest)	5
Italy (FIMI)	39
Japan Hot 100 (Billboard)	59
Latvia Streaming (DigiTop100)	30
Lebanon (Lebanese Top 20)	3
Malaysia (RIM)	7
Mexico Airplay (Billboard)	31
Netherlands (Dutch Top 40)	16
Netherlands (Single Top 100)	32
New Zealand (Recorded Music NZ)	17
Philippines (Philippine Hot 100)	9
Poland Airplay (ZPAV)	20
Portugal (AFP)	22
Russia Airplay (Tophit)	76
Scotland Singles (Official Charts)	8
Serbia (Radiomonitor)	1
Slovakia Airplay (ČNS IFPI)	55
Slovakia Singles Digital (ČNS IFPI)	18
Slovenia (SloTop50)	30
Spain (Promusicae)	15
Sweden (Sverigetopplistan)	44
Switzerland (Schweizer Hitparade)	20
UK Singles (Official Charts)	9
US Billboard Hot 100	21
US Adult Contemporary (Billboard)	13
US Adult Pop Airplay (Billboard)	2
US Dance Club Songs (Billboard)	32
US Dance Airplay (Billboard)	5
US Pop Airplay (Billboard)	3
US Radio Songs (Billboard)	5
US Rhythmic Airplay (Billboard)	25
Venezuela (National-Report)	28

=== Year-end charts ===
Chart (2017)	Position
Hungary (Stream Top 40)	66
Netherlands (Dutch Top 40)	88

Chart (2018)	Position
Canada (Canadian Hot 100)	61
France (SNEP)	189
Hungary (Dance Top 40)	49
Hungary (Rádiós Top 40)	46
Hungary (Single Top 40)	79
Iceland (Plötutíóindi)	51
Netherlands Airplay (Airplay Top 40)	81
US Billboard Hot 100	65
US Adult Contemporary (Billboard)	25
US Adult Top 40 (Billboard)	17
US Dance/Mix Show Airplay (Billboard)	28
US Mainstream Top 40 (Billboard)	29
US Radio Songs (Billboard)	31

== Certifications ==
Region	Certification	Certified units/sales
Australia (ARIA)	3× Platinum	210,000^{‡}
Belgium (BRMA)	Gold	10,000^{‡}
Canada (Music Canada)	3× Platinum	240,000^{‡}
Denmark (IFPI Danmark)	Platinum	90,000^{‡}
France (SNEP)	Platinum	200,000^{‡}
Germany (BVMI)	Gold	200,000^{‡}
Italy (FIMI)	Platinum	50,000^{‡}
New Zealand (RMNZ)	2× Platinum	60,000^{‡}
Norway (IFPI Norway)	Gold	30,000^{‡}
Poland (ZPAV)	Platinum	20,000^{‡}
Portugal (AFP)	Platinum	10,000^{‡}
Spain (Promusicae)	Platinum	60,000^{‡}
United Kingdom (BPI)	Platinum	600,000^{‡}
United States (RIAA)	3× Platinum	3,000,000^{‡}
Streaming
Japan (RIAJ)	Gold	50,000,000^{†}
^{‡} Sales+streaming figures based on certification alone.^{†} Streaming-only figures based on certification alone.

== Release history ==
Region	Date	Format	Version	Label	Ref.
Various	October 5, 2017	Digital download	Original	Atlantic	
Various	October 5, 2017	Digital download	Remix	Atlantic	
Various	October 5, 2017	Digital download	Throttle Remix	Atlantic	
United States	October 9, 2017	Hot adult contemporary radio	Original	Atlantic	
United States	October 10, 2017	Contemporary hit radio	Original	Atlantic	
Various	November 17, 2017	Digital download	Roisto Remix	Atlantic	
Various	December 8, 2017	Digital download	EDX's Dubai Skyline Remix	Atlantic	
Various	January 24, 2018	Digital download	Two Friends Remix	Atlantic	
