= The Way I Am (Charlie Puth song) =

Single by Charlie Puth

from the album Voicenotes
- Released: July 24, 2018
- Genre: Pop
- Length: 3:06
- Label: Atlantic
- Songwriters: Charlie Puth; Jacob Kasher Hindlin
- Producer: Charlie Puth

Charlie Puth singles chronology
"Change" (2018)	"The Way I Am" (2018)	"Easier (Remix)" (2019)

Music video
- "The Way I Am" on YouTube

"The Way I Am" is a song recorded and produced by American singer-songwriter Charlie Puth. It was sent to US contemporary hit radio through Atlantic Records on July 24, 2018, as the fifth and final single from his second studio album, Voicenotes. It was initially released as the second promotional single from the album on May 3, 2018. Puth wrote the song alongside Jacob Kasher Hindlin.

== Background ==
The song deals with Puth's reaction to his sudden fame, specifically his insecurities and anxieties. He has identified the song as his most personal on the album. The content of the song was so personal in fact that Puth "was almost crying while writing it because it was so overwhelming."

In an interview with Genius, Puth explained the meaning behind the song, saying: "I was known for who I was dating more than my music. People were forgetting that I was actually a singer. And that was not good and multiple people told me that wasn't good. I worked too hard to have that reputation. So I just like a slight steer to the left and brought it back to the music. I honestly feel better mentally than I ever have in my life."

== Composition ==
"The Way I Am" is an upbeat pop song in which Puth addresses his self-acceptance. Described as an "introspective, autobiographical track", it heavily features "a plugging electric guitar riff" throughout, with "Puth's vocals syncing up to the instrumental during the verses".

== Music video ==
Directed by Colin Tilley, the music video was released on July 9, 2018. It features Puth wandering from one room to another, interspersed between flashbacks of a house party that took place the night before and shots of him sitting alone on the roof of the house, as partygoers drink and dance past him in fast-motion. Throughout the video, he locks eyes with a brunette woman (acted by Trew Mullen); they come face to face and exchange smirks as the party comes to an end. Salvatore Maicki of The Fader regarded the video as "a nice aesthetic throwback to the late 90s", while PopSugar's Mekishana Pierre opined that Puth's character bears a resemblance to My So-Called Life's Jordan Catalano.

== Live performances ==
On June 22, 2018, Puth made the first televised performance of "The Way I Am" at the 2018 Radio Disney Music Awards. On July 17, he performed the song during his television appearances on The Tonight Show Starring Jimmy Fallon, as well as the Citi Concert Series on Today three days later.

== Track listing ==
Digital download
No.	Title	Length
1.	"The Way I Am"	3:06

Digital download
No.	Title	Length
1.	"The Way I Am" (Acoustic Version)	3:08

Digital download
No.	Title	Length
1.	"The Way I Am" (Eden Prince Remix)	3:12

Digital download
No.	Title	Length
1.	"The Way I Am" (Slushii Remix)	3:45

Digital download
No.	Title	Length
1.	"The Way I Am" (Taska Black Remix)	3:15

== Credits and personnel ==
Recording and management

- Published by Charlie Puth Music Publishing/Artist 101 Publishing Group (BMI) admin. by Warner Chappell; Rap Kingpin Music/Prescription Songs (ASCAP)

Personnel Credits adapted from the liner notes of Voicenotes.

- Charlie Puth – vocals, songwriting, production, recording
- Jacob Kasher – songwriting
- Jan Ozveren – guitar

== Charts ==
=== Weekly charts ===
Chart (2018)	Peak position
Belgium (Ultratip Bubbling Under Flanders)	14
Belgium (Ultratop 50 Wallonia)	29
Canada CHR/Top 40 (Billboard)	40
Canada Hot AC (Billboard)	40
France (SNEP)	175
Hungary (Rádiós Top 40)	39
Mexico Ingles Airplay (Billboard)	2
Poland Airplay (ZPAV)	58
US Billboard Hot 100	61
US Adult Contemporary (Billboard)	25
US Adult Pop Airplay (Billboard)	9
US Dance Club Songs (Billboard)	55
US Dance/Mix Show Airplay (Billboard)	18
US Pop Airplay (Billboard)	16

=== Year-end charts ===
Chart (2018)	Position
Taiwan (Hito Radio)	32
US Adult Top 40 (Billboard)	46

== Certifications ==
Region	Certification	Certified units/sales
Australia (ARIA)	Gold	35,000^{‡}
Canada (Music Canada)	Platinum	80,000^{‡}
United States (RIAA)	Platinum	1,000,000^{‡}
^{‡} Sales+streaming figures based on certification alone.

== Release history ==
Region	Date	Format	Version	Label	Ref.
Various (Note: Release as a promotional single.)	May 3, 2018	Digital download	Original	Atlantic	
United States	July 24, 2018	Contemporary hit radio	Original	Atlantic	
Various	July 27, 2018	Digital download	Eden Prince Remix	Atlantic	
Various	August 17, 2018	Digital download	Taska Black Remix	Atlantic	
Various	September 7, 2018	Digital download	Acoustic	Atlantic	
Various	September 7, 2018	Digital download	Slushii Remix	Atlantic	
Italy	September 14, 2018	Contemporary hit radio	Original	Warner	
