= 2020 Tour (Maroon 5 tour) =

2020 concert tour by Maroon 5

- Tour by Maroon 5
- Promotional poster for the tour
- Location: Latin America
- Start date: February 23, 2020
- End date: March 10, 2020
- Legs: 1
- No. of shows: 9

Maroon 5 concert chronology
- Red Pill Blues Tour (2018–2019); 2020 Tour (2020); MMXXI Tour (2021)

The 2020 Tour was the twelfth headlining tour by American band Maroon 5. Visiting in Latin America only, the tour began on February 23, 2020 in Mexico City and was forced to conclude on March 10, 2020 in Montevideo, Uruguay, comprising 9 concerts.

== Background ==
On November 11, 2019, Maroon 5 announced the 2020 Tour was revealed, which will take place in Latin America. The band confirmed more additional dates of the tour from November 19 and December 4, 2019, (with North America), respectively. Artists Meghan Trainor and Leon Bridges, were announced as opening acts in the North American leg in the summer. Since the tour began, the producer and sound engineer was Noah Passovoy, who served as touring DJ main opening act for the rest of the band's tour. During the March 1, 2020 show in São Paulo, Brazil, at Allianz Parque, the band, notably, continued the show despite heavy rain. On May 15, 2020, the band announced all dates of North American leg has been postponed to 2021, due to the coronavirus pandemic. The rescheduled dates will be billed as the MMXXI Tour.

== Controversy ==
On February 27, 2020, the band performed at the Viña del Mar International Song Festival, a televised music festival in Chile. The presentation, which began 29 minutes late, was listed as "mediocre" by the specialized press, inside and outside Chile. The BBC said that Adam Levine performed the songs with "lack of energy and out of tune", adding that the disappointment of the fans increased when videos were leaked, when he was leaving the stage, showing him angry and saying that "they were deceived", that it was a concert for television, and that Viña del Mar is a "shitty city". That created an atmosphere of rejection inside and outside of his fans who were very upset by the words of disrespect from the band's leader. Levine later posted an apology for the incident on Instagram and the band said they had experienced technical difficulties with the audio feed to Levine's ear pieces.

== Set list ==
The following set list was obtained from the concert held on February 28, 2020, in Santiago. It does not represent all concerts for the duration of the tour.

1. "This Love"
2. "What Lovers Do"
3. "Makes Me Wonder"
4. "Payphone"
5. "Wait"
6. "Love Somebody"
7. "Moves Like Jagger"
8. "Lucky Strike"
9. "Sunday Morning"
10. "Harder to Breathe"
11. "Cold"
12. "Don't Wanna Know"
13. "One More Night"
14. "Animals"
15. "Daylight"
16. "Sugar"

Encore

17. "Memories"
18. "Lost Stars"
19. "She Will Be Loved"
20. "Girls Like You"
Notes
- On February 24, 2020, "Memories" was dedicated to Kobe Bryant and his daughter Gianna, who were both killed from the Calabasas helicopter crash.

== Tour dates ==
List of 2020 concerts
Date	City	Country	Venue	Opening act
February 23	Mexico City	Mexico	Foro Sol	Okills; DJ Noah Passovoy
February 24	Mexico City	Mexico	Foro Sol	Okills; DJ Noah Passovoy
February 27 (Note: The concert on February 27, 2020 in Viña del Mar was part of the 2020 Viña del Mar International Song Festival.)	Viña del Mar	Chile	Quinta Vergara Amphitheater	—N/a
February 28 (Note: The concert on February 28, 2020 in Santiago was originally scheduled to take place at the Estadio Nacional, but it was moved to the Estadio Bicentenario de La Florida.)	Santiago	Chile	Estadio Bicentenario de La Florida	—N/a
March 1	São Paulo	Brazil	Allianz Parque	Melim; DJ Noah Passovoy
March 3	Brasília	Brazil	Estádio Nacional Mané Garrincha	Melim; DJ Noah Passovoy
March 5	Recife	Brazil	Esplanada do Classic Hall	Melim; DJ Noah Passovoy
March 7	Rio de Janeiro	Brazil	Área Externa da Jeunesse Arena	Melim; DJ Noah Passovoy
March 10	Montevideo	Uruguay	Estadio Centenario	Meri Deal; DJ Noah Passovoy

== Cancelled dates ==
List of cancelled concerts, showing date, city, country, venue and reason for cancellation
Date	City	Country	Venue	Reason	Ref.
June 25	Flushing	United States	Citi Field	COVID-19 pandemic	
September 9	Hartford	United States	Xfinity Theatre	COVID-19 pandemic	
