= Red Pill Blues Tour =

2018–19 concert tour by Maroon 5

- World tour by Maroon 5
- Promotional poster for the tour
- Location: Asia; Europe; North America; Oceania; South America
- Associated album: Red Pill Blues
- Start date: May 30, 2018
- End date: December 31, 2019
- Legs: 9
- No. of shows: 65

Maroon 5 concert chronology
- Maroon V Tour (2015–2018); Red Pill Blues Tour (2018–2019); 2020 Tour (2020)

The Red Pill Blues Tour was the eleventh headlining concert tour by American band Maroon 5, in support of their sixth studio album Red Pill Blues (2017). The tour began on May 30, 2018 in Tacoma, Washington and concluded on December 31, 2019 in Las Vegas, Nevada. With over sixty dates, the tour traveled to the Americas, Australia, Asia, and Europe.

== Background ==
Maroon 5 announced the tour on October 26, 2017 and produced by Live Nation Entertainment, with American singer Julia Michaels, who served as the opening act in North America. On August 28, 2018, the band announced new dates for Australia, Asia and Europe. Artists, Cxloe (Australia) and Sigrid (Europe), were announced as the tour's opening acts.

== Opening acts ==
=== 2018 ===
- Julia Michaels (North America)
- PJ Morton (North America)
- Robert DeLong (North America)
- Lee Brice (North America)

=== 2019 ===
- DJ Noah Passovoy (Australia / Asia / Europe)
- Cxloe (Australia)
- Sigrid (Europe)
- Brynn Cartelli (North America)
- Chevel Shepherd (North America)
- Phantom Planet (North America)

== Setlist ==
This setlist is based on the show in Tacoma, Washington on May 30, 2018. It is not intended to represent all dates throughout the tour.

1. "What Lovers Do"
2. "Payphone"
3. "This Love"
4. "Stereo Hearts"
5. "Sunday Morning"
6. "Animals"
7. "One More Night"
8. "Cold"
9. "Wait"
10. "Don't Wanna Know"
11. "It Was Always You"
12. "Love Somebody"
13. "Makes Me Wonder"
14. "Rock with You"
15. "Moves Like Jagger"

Encore

16. "Lost Stars"
17. "She Will Be Loved"
18. "Forever Young" / "Girls Like You"
19. "Maps"
20. "Sugar"

=== Asia ===
This setlist is based on the concert in Taiwan on March 1, 2019. It is not intended to represent all dates throughout the Asian leg.

1. "What Lovers Do"
2. "Payphone"
3. "This Love"
4. "Misery"
5. "Sunday Morning"
6. "Animals"
7. "One More Night"
8. "Cold"
9. "Maps"
10. "Harder to Breathe"
11. "Don't Wanna Know"
12. "Wait"
13. "Makes Me Wonder"
14. "Rock with You"
15. "Moves Like Jagger"

Encore

16. "Forever Young" / "Girls Like You"
17. "Lost Stars"
18. "She Will Be Loved"
19. "Sugar"

=== Notes ===
- During the show in Nashville, actress Millie Bobby Brown made an appearance to perform the rap verse of "Girls Like You".
- During the shows in Doha and Las Vegas, Maroon 5 performed "Memories".
- During the show in Salt Lake City, Utah, Adam Levine performed "Lost Stars" dedicated to rapper Mac Miller, who died earlier that day.
- During the show in Detroit, Michigan, Levine performed "She Will Be Loved" dedicated to singer Aretha Franklin.

== Shows ==
List of concerts, showing date, city, country, venue, opening acts, tickets sold, number of available tickets and amount of gross revenue
Date	City	Country	Venue	Opening act(s)	Attendance	Revenue
2018
North America
May 30	Tacoma	United States	Tacoma Dome	Julia Michaels	17,080 / 18,133	$1,412,098
June 1	Oakland	United States	Oracle Arena	Julia Michaels	—	—
June 2	Sacramento	United States	Golden 1 Center	Julia Michaels	12,997 / 13,713	$1,476,982
June 4	Inglewood	United States	The Forum	Julia Michaels	25,385 / 25,385	$2,444,343
June 5	Inglewood	United States	The Forum	Julia Michaels	25,385 / 25,385	$2,444,343
June 7	Phoenix	United States	Talking Stick Resort Arena	Julia Michaels	13,418 / 13,739	$1,440,465
June 9	Dallas	United States	American Airlines Center	Julia Michaels	13,569 / 14,060	$1,570,742
June 10	Houston	United States	Toyota Center	Julia Michaels	10,799 / 11,849	$1,294,322
June 12	San Antonio	United States	AT&T Center	Julia Michaels	12,843 / 14,149	$1,206,050
June 14	New Orleans	United States	Smoothie King Center	Julia Michaels	—	—
June 16	Tampa	United States	Amalie Arena	Julia Michaels	14,868 / 14,940	$1,465,135
June 17	Sunrise	United States	BB&T Center	Julia Michaels	13,193 / 13,618	$1,335,148
July 14	Hershey	United States	Hersheypark Stadium	PJ Morton	19,332 / 20,588	$946,947
July 15	Atlantic City	United States	Etess Arena at Hard Rock Live	PJ Morton	—	—
August 4 (Note: The concert on August 4, 2018, in Cedar Rapids is part of the Newbo Evolve Festival.)	Cedar Rapids	United States	Newbo Evolve	Robert DeLong	7,587 / 18,880	$633,105
August 5 (Note: The concert on August 5, 2018, in Canton at Tom Benson Hall of Fame Stadium is part of the 2018 Pro Football Hall of Fame.)	Canton	United States	Tom Benson Hall of Fame Stadium	Lee Brice	—	—
August 25 (Note: The concert on August 25, 2018, in Monterrey at Fundidora Park is part of the Bud Light Hellow Festival.)	Monterrey	Mexico	Fundidora Park	—	—	—
September 7	Salt Lake City	United States	Vivint Smart Home Arena	Julia Michaels	—	—
September 9	Denver	United States	Pepsi Center	Julia Michaels	12,389 / 19,200	$1,413,172
September 11	Kansas City	United States	Sprint Center	Julia Michaels	10,702 / 10,702	$964,983
September 13	St. Louis	United States	Enterprise Center	Julia Michaels	11,242 / 12,876	$928,490
September 14	Chicago	United States	United Center	Julia Michaels	13,582 / 15,126	$1,496,196
September 16	Milwaukee	United States	Fiserv Forum	Julia Michaels	10,251 / 12,583	$1,118,133
September 18	Saint Paul	United States	Xcel Energy Center	Julia Michaels	12,663 / 14,890	$1,236,759
September 20	Indianapolis	United States	Bankers Life Fieldhouse	Julia Michaels	11,781 / 12,501	$1,048,562
September 22	Louisville	United States	KFC Yum! Center	Julia Michaels	13,909 / 17,767	$1,219,048
September 23	Nashville	United States	Bridgestone Arena	Julia Michaels	12,975 / 13,616	$1,172,820
September 25	Columbus	United States	Nationwide Arena	Julia Michaels	12,850 / 13,661	$1,249,654
September 27	Toronto	Canada	Scotiabank Arena	Julia Michaels	16,006 / 16,006	$1,578,711
September 29	Pittsburgh	United States	PPG Paints Arena	Julia Michaels	13,386 / 13,537	$1,275,219
September 30	Detroit	United States	Little Caesars Arena	Julia Michaels	16,391 / 20,000	$1,604,504
October 2	Washington, D.C.	United States	Capital One Arena	Julia Michaels	14,503 / 15,381	$1,548,259
October 4	Charlotte	United States	Spectrum Center	Julia Michaels	14,944 / 15,692	$1,483,234
October 6	Newark	United States	Prudential Center	Julia Michaels	13,107 / 13,432	$1,857,223
October 7	Boston	United States	TD Garden	Julia Michaels	13,225 / 13,485	$1,600,769
October 10	Hartford	United States	XL Center	Julia Michaels	10,899 / 12,744	$929,142
October 12	Philadelphia	United States	Wells Fargo Center	Julia Michaels	14,459 / 15,888	$1,650,148
October 14	New York City	United States	Madison Square Garden	Julia Michaels	28,275 / 28,275	$3,980,239
October 15	New York City	United States	Madison Square Garden	Julia Michaels	28,275 / 28,275	$3,980,239
November 10 (Note: The concert on November 10, 2018 in Philadelphia was part of a free event to benefit the Philly Fights Cancer.)	Philadelphia	United States	Philadelphia Naval Shipyard	—	—	—
December 30 (Note: The concerts on December 30 and 31, 2018, in Las Vegas at Mandalay Bay Events Center is part of the New Year's Eve 2019 Festival.)	Las Vegas	United States	Mandalay Bay Events Center	—	—	—
December 31	Las Vegas	United States	Mandalay Bay Events Center	—	—	—
2019
Oceania
February 19	Brisbane	Australia	Brisbane Entertainment Centre	DJ Noah Passovoy; Cxloe	10,572 / 10,827	$952,243
February 21	Sydney	Australia	Qudos Bank Arena	Cxloe	16,602 / 16,602	$1,526,547
February 22	Melbourne	Australia	Rod Laver Arena	Cxloe	28,270 / 28,270	$2,609,402
February 23	Melbourne	Australia	Rod Laver Arena	Cxloe	28,270 / 28,270	$2,609,402
Asia
February 25	Tokyo	Japan	Tokyo Dome	DJ Noah Passovoy	—	—
February 27	Seoul	South Korea	Gocheok Sky Dome	DJ Noah Passovoy	30,573 / 30,573	$3,533,735
March 1	Kaohsiung	Taiwan	National Stadium	DJ Noah Passovoy	47,669 / 48,033	$5,572,698
March 3	Macau		Cotai Arena	—	12,647 / 12,667	$2,371,387
March 5	Pasay	Philippines	Mall of Asia Arena	—	—	—
March 7	Singapore		National Stadium	—	43,301 / 47,157	$5,562,070
March 9	Bangkok	Thailand	Challenger Hall	—	18,301 / 18,301	$2,399,003
Europe
June 1	Aalborg	Denmark	Mølleparken	DJ Noah Passovoy; Sigrid	16,611 / 16,611	$1,507,428
June 3	Cologne	Germany	Lanxess Arena	DJ Noah Passovoy; Sigrid	16,255 / 16,255	$1,171,871
June 5	Prague	Czech Republic	O_{2} Arena	Sigrid	16,507 / 16,507	$1,208,223
June 6	Kraków	Poland	Tauron Arena	Sigrid	18,023 / 18,023	$1,383,301
June 8 (Note: The concert on June 8, 2019, in London at Wembley Stadium is part of the Summertime Ball.)	London	England	Wembley Stadium	—	—	—
June 10	Amsterdam	Netherlands	Ziggo Dome	Sigrid	16,206 / 16,206	$1,065,357
June 11	Paris	France	AccorHotels Arena	Sigrid	16,178 / 16,178	$1,218,247
Asia
June 14	Dubai	United Arab Emirates	Coca-Cola Arena	—	—	—
South America
August 31 (Note: The concert on August 31, 2019, in Willemstad at World Trade Center Piscadera Bay is part of the Curaçao North Sea Jazz Festival.)	Willemstad	Curaçao	World Trade Center; Piscadera Bay	—	—	—
North America
October 25	Hollywood	United States	Seminole Hard Rock Hotel & Casino	Brynn Cartelli; Chevel Shepherd	5,800 / 5,800	$1,100,000
Asia
December 19 (Note: The concert on December 19, 2019, in Doha at the Doha Exhibition and Convention Center is part of the Qatar Live Festival.)	Doha	Qatar	Doha Exhibition and Convention Center	—	—	—
North America
December 30 (Note: The concerts on December 30 and 31, 2019, in Las Vegas at Mandalay Bay Events Center is part of the New Year's Eve 2020 Festival.)	Las Vegas	United States	Mandalay Bay Events Center	Phantom Planet	15,437 / 16,634	$2,419,966
December 31	Las Vegas	United States	Mandalay Bay Events Center	Phantom Planet	15,437 / 16,634	$2,419,966
Total					767,562 / 821,060 (93.44%)	$80,182,080

== Cancelled shows ==
List of cancelled concerts, showing date, city, country, venue and reason for cancellation
Date	City	Country	Venue	Reason	Ref.
2018
July 13 (Note: The concert on July 13, 2018, in New York City at Rockefeller Plaza was originally to be part of the Citi Summer Concert Series, but was cancelled due to scheduling conflict.)	New York City	United States	Rockefeller Plaza	Scheduling conflict	
2019
July 6 (Note: The concerts on July 6 and 7, 2019, in São Paulo at Autódromo José Carlos Pace was originally to be part of the VillaMix Festival, but was cancelled due to the festival has been postponed.)	São Paulo	Brazil	Autódromo José Carlos Pace	Festival postponement	
July 7	São Paulo	Brazil	Autódromo José Carlos Pace	Festival postponement	
