= Red Pill Blues =

Studio album by Maroon 5
- Released: November 3, 2017
- Recorded: 2015–2017
- Studios: Chumba Meadows, The Venice, Glenwood Palace (California); Inner Child (London); Conway, Westlake, Henson (Los Angeles); Electric Lady, Matzah Ball, Sterling Sound (New York); (Wolf Cousins (Stockholm, Sweden); MixStar (Virginia Beach)
- Genres: Pop; R&B; funk; soft rock
- Length: 42:10
- Labels: 222; Interscope
- Producers: John Ryan; Noah Passavoy; OzGo; Phil Paul; Sam Farrar; Jason Evigan; Julien Bunetta; Afterhrs; Ben Billions; Charlie Puth; Diplo; King Henry; Ricky Reed; Cirkut; TMS; Benny Blanco; The Arcade; Louie Lastic; Ryan Ogren; Nick Bailey

Maroon 5 chronology
Singles (2015)	Red Pill Blues (2017)	Jordi (2021)

Singles from Red Pill Blues
- 1. "Don't Wanna Know" Released: October 11, 2016; 2. "Cold" Released: February 14, 2017; 3. "What Lovers Do" Released: August 30, 2017; 4. "Wait" Released: January 16, 2018; 5. "Girls Like You" Released: May 31, 2018

Red Pill Blues is the sixth studio album by American band Maroon 5. It was released on November 3, 2017, through 222 and Interscope Records. This is the band's first album to feature multi-instrumentalist Sam Farrar as an official member, although he has featured on every Maroon 5 release prior and toured with them since 2012. It is also the final album to feature bassist Mickey Madden as a full member, making this their only album as a 7-piece band. The title of the album refers to the science fiction term of taking the red pill or the blue pill, which originated from the 1999 sci-fi film The Matrix. The album is the follow-up to their fifth studio album V (2014) and features guest appearances from Kendrick Lamar, Julia Michaels, SZA, ASAP Rocky, LunchMoney Lewis, Future and Cardi B.

Red Pill Blues received mixed reviews from music critics upon its release, and peaked at number two on the US Billboard 200. The album includes the singles "Don't Wanna Know", "Cold", "What Lovers Do", "Wait", and "Girls Like You". The first two singles, "Don't Wanna Know" and "Cold", are included on both of the album's deluxe and Japanese editions respectively. The third single "What Lovers Do", peaked within the top ten in twenty-five countries including Australia, Canada and the United States. The album's fourth single "Wait", received moderate success, peaking at number twenty-four in the United States, thirty-five on the Canadian Hot 100, and seventy-nine in the UK Singles. The fifth and final single from the reissued edition of the album "Girls Like You", was released in a new version featuring rapper Cardi B and peaked at number one on the US Billboard Hot 100, as well as in the top five in Australia and Canada. The band embarked on the Red Pill Blues Tour (2018–2019) in support of the album.

== Background ==
After touring in support of their fifth studio album V (2014) for over three years, Maroon 5 began planning a follow-up to V. After embarking on a short rescheduled headlining tour in North America in March 2017, the band recording new material for a sixth album at Conway Recording Studios in Los Angeles, California. The band later posted teaser gifs and videos of members in the studio on their social media accounts in late March.

At the 2017 Teen Choice Awards, held on August 13, 2017, Maroon 5 was honored with the Decade Award. In his acceptance speech, frontman Adam Levine confirmed that their sixth album would be released in November. Levine later confirmed this in an interview with Zane Lowe on Apple Music radio station Beats 1. On October 4, 2017, the band revealed the album's name, Red Pill Blues, and announced the pre-order for the album on October 6. Describing the meaning between this album and the band's first album Songs About Jane (2002), Levine said: "I think this album and the first album are probably the most connected. This album seems to me like a cousin to the first album, there’s a relationship kind of like book-ended all the ones in between."

== Artwork ==
The album cover art for Red Pill Blues was created by American photographer Travis Schneider and is inspired by filters featured on the mobile app Snapchat. The cover depicts all seven members of Maroon 5 pictured on polaroid photographs with a filter on their faces. "We all use Snapchat, and the filters have become a huge part of the culture," frontman Adam Levine told Billboard in an October 2017 interview. "We thought it would be funny to take some more straight-ahead band photos and sprinkle in a little fun." Guitarist James Valentine added by saying: "It's like, a part of the zeitgeist now. Adam [Levine] and his wife, they just love trading photos when we're touring and stuff. They're always doing those filter faces to each other, so I think it rose out of that. Adam always has fun with that."

It also won the bronze award at the 2018 Shorty Awards, with both the album's cover art for Best Use of Snapchat and the wallpaper promotion for Best Influencer and Celebrity Snapchat Campaign.

== Singles ==
Red Pill Blues was preceded by two commercial stand-alone releases, which were later included on both the deluxe and Japanese editions of the album. The first stand-alone single was "Don't Wanna Know" featuring American rapper Kendrick Lamar, was released digital retailers on October 11, 2016, and charted at No. 6 on the US Billboard Hot 100 and topped the Adult Top 40, Adult Contemporary, and Hot 100 Airplay charts. A music video for the song's original version premiered exclusively on The Today Show on October 14, 2016.

A second stand-alone single, "Cold" featuring American rapper Future, was released on February 14, 2017, and charted at No. 16 on the Hot 100 and No. 5 on the Adult Top 40 chart. The song's music video premiered the day after, February 15.

"What Lovers Do", featuring American R&B singer SZA was released by the band on August 30, 2017, as the third single from the album. A lyric video was uploaded on September 15, 2017, while the music video for the song was released on September 28. The single peaked at number nine on the Hot 100 and became the band's thirteenth top ten hit on the chart.

James Valentine announced on Twitter that "Wait" would be the fourth single from the album. The song was officially released to US contemporary hit radio on January 16, 2018, as the album's fourth single. It peaked at number 24 on the Hot 100.

A remix version of "Girls Like You" featuring Cardi B served as the fifth and final single and was released on May 31, 2018. It was the first single from the re-release of the album and the most successful single. The song peaked at number one on the Hot 100 chart for seven weeks, becoming Maroon 5's fourth and Cardi B's third number-one. It spent 33 weeks in the top 10, tying both with Ed Sheeran's "Shape of You" and Post Malone and Swae Lee's "Sunflower" for the longest top 10 run in the chart's archives at the time. It became the first pop song to reach number one since "Havana" by Camila Cabello in January 2018. "Girls Like You" set a record for most weeks at No. 1 on the Adult Contemporary chart, remaining atop this chart for 36 consecutive weeks.

=== Promotional singles ===
"Help Me Out", featuring American singer-songwriter Julia Michaels, was released on October 6, 2017, as the first promotional single of the album. The second promotional single, "Whiskey" featuring American rapper ASAP Rocky, was released to digital retailers on October 20, 2017. Before becoming the fourth single, "Wait" was initially released as the third promotional single on October 31.

== Promotion and touring ==
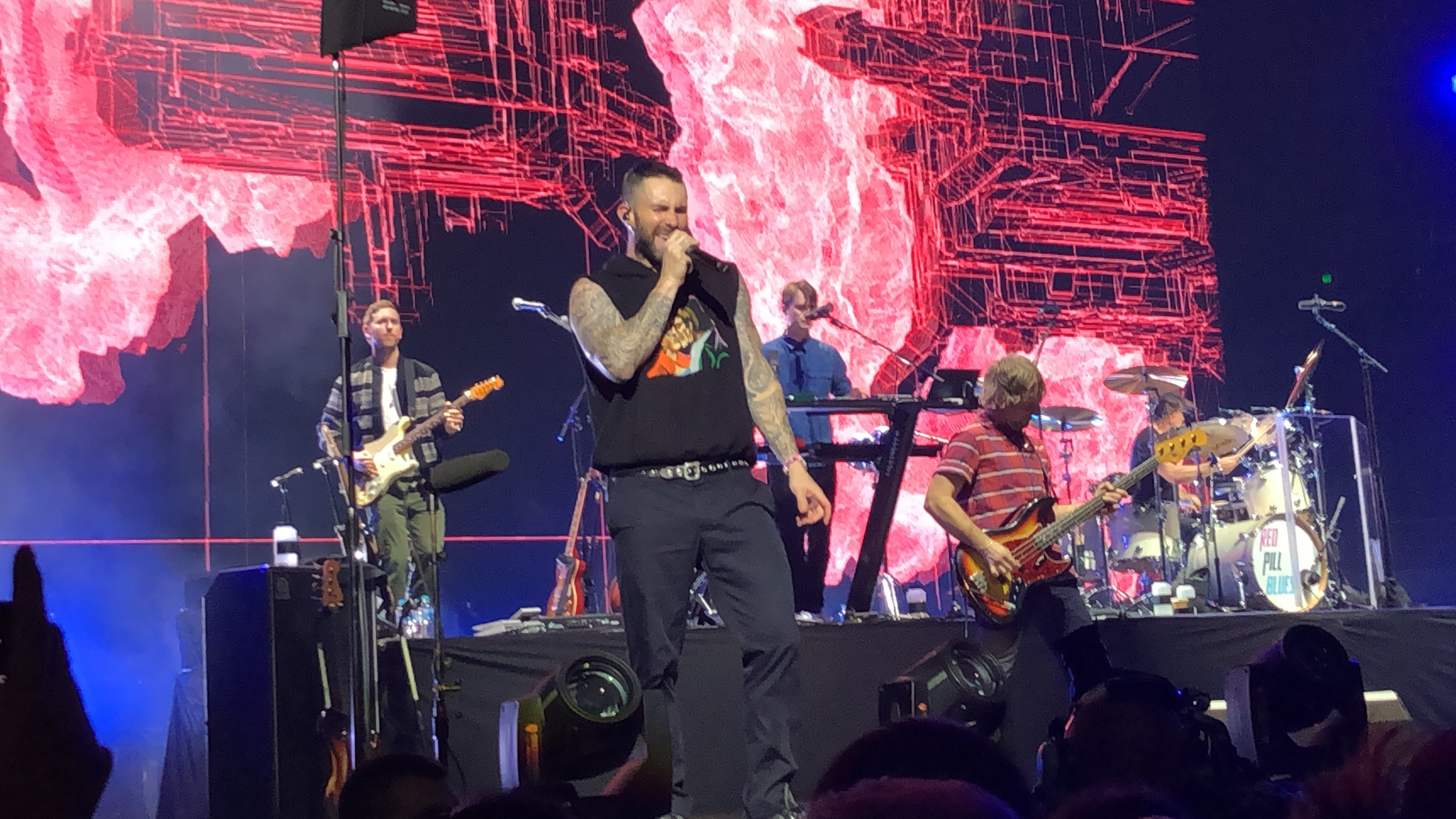
Maroon 5 performing live in 2019.

On November 7, 2017, Maroon 5 played a concert at the iHeartRadio Theater in Burbank, California, to commemorate the release of the album. On October 26, the band announced they would embark on the Red Pill Blues Tour. The tour began on May 30, 2018, in Tacoma, Washington and ended on December 31, 2019, in Las Vegas, Nevada, comprising 65 shows. The took place in North America from May to October 2018, with Michaels as the tour's opening act.

On August 28, 2018, Maroon 5 announced new dates for the tour in 2019 in Australia, Asia and Europe. Artists Cxloe (Australia) and Sigrid (Europe), were announced as the tour's opening acts.

== Critical reception ==
Professional ratings
Aggregate scores
Source	Rating
AnyDecentMusic?	4.9/10
Metacritic	58/100
Review scores
Source	Rating
AllMusic	3.5/5 stars
Entertainment Weekly	B
Financial Times	3/5 stars
The Guardian	3/5 stars
Pitchfork	4.8/10
Rolling Stone	3.5/5 stars
Slant Magazine	2/5 stars
The Times	2/5 stars

Red Pill Blues received mixed reviews from music critics. On Metacritic, the album has a score of 58/100 based on eight reviews, indicating "mixed or average reviews". Stephen Thomas Erlewine from AllMusic wrote that after setting aside the album's title and cover, Red Pill Blues can be taken as a "sleek, assured affair, one that sustains a seductive neon-streaked mood from beginning to end." He found their "modern sheen" to contain "strong song foundations" that in turn makes it not "play like a collective rhythmic and melodic hook in search of an ear: each cut unfolds with its own internal logic, with the different textures playing nicely off each other." Entertainment Weekly's Madison Vain described the album as the "best and most cohesive set of the decade" due to the group collaborating with a "murderers’ row of Hot 100 collaborators" that "ensures there's hardly a stale moment." Rolling Stone's Jon Dolan found Adam Levine capably nuancing the "Top 40 old soul navigating whatever the pop-music moment throws his way" role as he "works well alongside young talent" to prove himself as a "pliant star of Jacksonian ease and Stingly self-assurance." Taylor Weatherby of Billboard wrote that the record "presents the most electronic production the band has seen to date" in the "classic Maroon 5 fashion" through "supplementing the synthy bass lines with irresistible beats and smooth vocals," while commending the collaborations and the lyrical portrayals of "relationship talk." Ludovic Hunter-Tilney from the Financial Times said that although feminist listeners "may struggle to discern solidarity" in certain suggestive track couplets, the album still "makes its way through the minefield" since its "smooth high vocals and catchy tunes" gives the songs "a degree of charm" while its "deft production lends depth to the slick music."

Jayson Greene of Pitchfork affirmed the group's "shrewd and easy touch with soft rock" in "Best 4 U", but felt that the album's "utter lack of libido" made it "so difficult to even finish" especially since "soft rock and sex have a tricky relationship, and so do sex and Hot 100 pop." Michael Hann from The Guardian noted Maroon 5's continuation of producing "impeccably structured pop songs" with "Help Me Out", but felt that Red Pill Blues was not an R&B album "in any remotely experimental way." Writing for The Times, Will Hodgkinson commented that despite the "vacuity of the music and the words," whose former was "made up of noises from Maroon 5's pop machine" and whose latter was "unconvincing expressions of love and sensuality delivered passionlessly by Levine," the record was nevertheless "unpretentious and actually quite fun." Slant Magazine's Zachary Hoskins mentioned that Maroon 5 has "rebranded themselves as Daryl Hall and six John Oates—or at least a watered-down Chromeo" with the record's release whose "retro sound suits them," yet felt that it still has its share of "bland, underachieving grist for suburban shopping centers and rhythmic pop radio" with Levine's "digitally augmented vocal acrobatics" still as likely to "irritate as ingratiate."

=== Accolades ===
Accolades for Red Pill Blues
Year	Ceremony	Category	Result	Ref.
2018	Shorty Awards	Best Use of Snapchat	Bronze	
2018	Shorty Awards	Best Influencer and Celebrity Snapchat Campaign	Bronze	
2019	Juno Awards	International Album of the Year	Nominated	

== Commercial performance ==
In the United States, Red Pill Blues debuted at number two on the Billboard 200, with 122,000 album-equivalent units, of which 94,000 were pure album sales, becoming the band's sixth top ten album in the country. The album was kept off the top spot by Sam Smith's The Thrill of It All. By the end of the year, Red Pill Blues had accumulated 596,000 album-equivalent units in the country, with 185,000 being pure sales. On May 17, 2018, Red Pill Blues was certified Platinum by the Recording Industry Association of America for combined sales and album-equivalent units of over 1,000,000 units in the United States.

It is also Maroon 5's sixth top ten album in Australia, opening at number seven on the ARIA Albums Chart. The album entered the Canadian Albums Chart at number two, becoming their sixth top five entry in Canada. Elsewhere, it debuted at number six on the New Zealand Albums Chart, and at number 12 on the UK Albums Chart.

== Track listing ==
Standard edition
No.	Title	Writer(s)	Producer(s)	Length
1.	"Best 4 U"	Adam Levine; John Ryan; Julian Bunetta; Alexander Izquierdo; Ian Franzino; Jacob Kasher Hindlin; Andrew Haas	Bunetta; Afterhrs; Noah "Mailbox" Passovoy	3:59
2.	"What Lovers Do" (featuring SZA)	Brittany Talia Hazzard; Levine; Jason Evigan; Solána Imani Rowe; Benjamin Diehl; Oladayo Olatunji; Victor Rådström; Elina Stridh	Evigan; Sam Farrar^{[a]}; Passovoy^{[a]}; Ben Billions^{[b]}	3:19
3.	"Wait"	Levine; Hindlin; Ryan; Ammar Malik	Ryan; Passovoy^{[a]}	3:10
4.	"Lips on You"	Levine; Hindlin; Charlie Puth; Julia Michaels; Evigan	Puth; Evigan	3:36
5.	"Bet My Heart"	Levine; Hindlin; Ryan; Phil Shaouy	Ryan; Phil Paul; Passavoy	3:16
6.	"Help Me Out" (with Julia Michaels)	Levine; Thomas Pentz; Michaels; Henry Allen; Justin Tranter	Diplo; King Henry; Farrar^{[b]}; Passavoy^{[b]}	3:13
7.	"Who I Am" (featuring LunchMoney Lewis)	Levine; Gamal Lewis; Hindlin; Eric Frederic; Ryan; Malik; Teddy Geiger	Ricky Reed	3:03
8.	"Whiskey" (featuring ASAP Rocky)	Levine; Ryan; Hindlin; Tinashe Sibanda; Rakim Mayers	Ryan; Hindlin	3:30
9.	"Girls Like You"	Levine; Hazzard; Evigan; Henry Walter; Gian Stone	Cirkut; Evigan	3:35
10.	"Closure"	Levine; Hindlin; Ryan; Shaouy; Malik	Ryan; Paul; Passavoy	11:29
Total length:				42:10

Deluxe edition bonus tracks
No.	Title	Writer(s)	Producer(s)	Length
11.	"Denim Jacket"	Levine; James Alan Ghaleb; Tom Barnes; Peter Kelleher; Ben Kohn; Oscar Görres; Hindlin	TMS; OzGo	3:52
12.	"Visions"	Levine; Ryan Ogren; Nick Bailey; Jared Watson; Dustin Bushnell	Ogren; Passavoy; Nick Bailey^{[b]}	3:50
13.	"Don't Wanna Know" (featuring Kendrick Lamar)	Levine; Benjamin Levin; Ryan; Hindlin; Malik; Kurtis McKenzie; Jon Mills; Alex Ben-Abdallah; Kendrick Duckworth	Benny Blanco; The Arcade; Louie Lastic; Passovoy^{[a]}	3:34
14.	"Cold" (featuring Future)	Levine; Hindlin; Ryan; Tranter; Shaouy; Noel Fisher; Nayvadius Wilburn	Hindlin; Paul; Ryan	3:54
Total length:				57:20

Standard edition (reissue bonus track)
No.	Title	Writer(s)	Producer(s)	Length
11.	"Girls Like You" (featuring Cardi B)	Levine; Hazzard; Evigan; Walter; Stone; Belcalis Almanzar	Cirkut; Evigan	3:55
Total length:				46:05

Digital download and streaming edition (bonus tracks)
No.	Title	Writer(s)	Producer(s)	Length
13.	"Plastic Rose"	Levine; Ghaleb; Görres; Hindlin	OzGo	3:42
14.	"Don't Wanna Know" (featuring Kendrick Lamar)	Levine; Levin; Ryan; Hindlin; Malik; McKenzie; Mills; Ben-Abdallah; Duckworth	Blanco; The Arcade; Lastic; Passovoy^{[a]}	3:34
15.	"Cold" (featuring Future)	Levine; Ryan; Hindlin; Tranter; Shaouy; Fisher; Wilburn	Hindlin; Paul; Ryan	3:54
Total length:				61:02

Digital download and streaming edition (reissue bonus track)
No.	Title	Writer(s)	Producer(s)	Length
16.	"Girls Like You" (featuring Cardi B)	Levine; Hazzard; Evigan; Walter; Stone; Almanzar	Cirkut; Evigan	3:55
Total length:				64:57

Deluxe edition bonus disc (Live in Manchester 2015)
No.	Title	Writer(s)	Length
1.	"Moves Like Jagger" (live)	Levine; Levin; Malik; Shellback	4:59
2.	"Stereo Hearts" (live)	Travie McCoy; Levine; Levin; Sterling Fox; Malik; Dan Omelio	3:42
3.	"Animals" (live)	Levine; Shellback; Levin	4:30
4.	"Daylight" (live)	Levine; Max Martin; Sam Martin; Mason Levy	6:56
5.	"Maps" (live)	Levine; Ryan Tedder; Levin; Malik; Noel Zancanella	4:22
6.	"This Love" (live)	Levine; Jesse Carmichael	5:01
Total length:			29:30

Japanese edition bonus disc (Live in Manchester 2015)
No.	Title	Writer(s)	Length
1.	"Moves Like Jagger" (live)	Adam Levine; Levin; Malik; Shellback
2.	"Sugar" (live)	Levine; Joshua Coleman; Lukasz Gottwald; Jacob Kasher Hindlin; Mike Posner; Henry Walter
3.	"Daylight" (live)	Levine; Max Martin; Sam Martin; Mason Levy
4.	"Payphone" (live)	Levine; Levin; Malik; Dan Omelio; Shellback; Cameron Thomaz
5.	"Maps" (live)	Adam Levine; Tedder; Levin; Malik; Zancanella
6.	"Stereo Hearts" (live)	McCoy; Levine; Levin; Fox; Malik; Omelio
7.	"Harder to Breathe" (live)	Levine; Carmichael
8.	"This Love" (live)	Levine; Carmichael
9.	"Animals" (live)	Levine; Shellback; Levin

Mexico tour edition (bonus tracks)
No.	Title	Writer(s)	Producer(s)	Length
16.	"Girls Like You" (featuring Cardi B; St. Vincent Remix)	Levine; Walter; Almanzar; Hazzard; Evigan; Stone	Cirkut; Evigan	3:31
17.	"What Lovers Do" (featuring SZA; Slushii Remix)	Levine; Hazzard; Evigan; Rowe; Diehl; Olatunji; Rådström; Stridh	Evigan; Farrar^{[a]}; Passovoy^{[a]}; Billions^{[b]}	4:15
18.	"Cold" (featuring Future; Gucci Mane Remix)	Levine; Ryan; Hindlin; Tranter; Shaouy; Noel Fisher; Wilburn; Radric Delantic Davis	Hindlin; Paul; Ryan	3:39
Total length:				72:27

Mexico tour edition DVD
No.	Title	Length
1.	"Girls Like You" (music video; featuring Cardi B)	4:31
2.	"Girls Like You" (behind the scenes teaser; featuring Cardi B)	0:31
3.	"What Lovers Do" (music video; featuring SZA)	3:34
4.	"What Lovers Do" (behind the scenes; featuring SZA)	3:20
5.	"Wait" (music video)	3:35
6.	"Wait" (music video; Snapchat version)	3:08
7.	"Wait" (behind the scenes)	3:00
8.	"Cold" (music video; featuring Future)	6:51
Total length:		28:30

2018 Red Pill Blues + Version (Japanese Edition)

1 Maroon 5– Best 4 U 3:59

2 Maroon 5 + SZA (2)– What Lovers Do 3:19

3 Maroon 5– Wait 3:10

4 Maroon 5– Lips On You 3:36

5 Maroon 5– Bet My Heart 3:16

6 Maroon 5 + Julia Michaelis– Help Me Out 3:13

7 Maroon 5 + LunchMoney Lewis– Who I Am 3:03

8 Maroon 5 + A$AP Rocky*– Whiskey 3:30

9 Maroon 5– Girls Like You 3:35

10 Maroon 5– Closure 11:28

Bonus

11 Maroon 5– Denim Jacket 3:52

12 Maroon 5– Visions 3:50

13 Maroon 5- Plastic Rose 3:42 +++

14 Maroon 5 + Kendrick Lamar– Don't Wanna Know 3:34

15 Maroon 5 + Future (4)– Cold 3:54

Remixes Like You (Bonus CD 2)

1 Maroon 5 + Cardi B– Girls Like You 3:56

2 Maroon 5 + Nicki Minaj– Sugar (Remix) 3:54

3 Maroon 5 + Mary J. Blige Remix Mark Ronson– Wake Up Call (Mark Ronson Remix) 3:13

4 Maroon 5 + Rihanna– If I Never See Your Face Again 3:18

5 Maroon 5 + Christina Aguilera– Moves Like Jagger 3:21

6 Maroon 5 + Gwen Stefani– My Heart Is Open 3:57

7 Maroon 5 + Cardi B– Girls Like You (Cray Remix)

8 Maroon 5 + SZA (2) Remix A-Trak– What Lovers Do (A-Trak Remix)

+++ Previously Released Only On Digital Version Of Album And Some Deluxe Early Access Digital Codes

Notes

- ^{^a} signifies an additional producer
- ^{^b} signifies a co-producer

Sample credits

- "What Lovers Do" contains elements of "Sexual", written by Oladayo Olatunji, Victor Rådström and Elina Stridh.

== Credits and personnel ==
=== Personnel ===
All credits are adapted from the Red Pill Blues liner notes.

Maroon 5

- Adam Levine – lead vocals (all); guitar (7, 9, 10, 16); programming (3)
- Jesse Carmichael – guitar (1–7, 10–15)
- Mickey Madden – bass (2, 3, 5, 10–12)
- James Valentine – guitar (1–3, 5–7, 10–15); handclaps (10)
- Matt Flynn – drums, percussion (1–7, 10–15); backing vocals (4); handclaps (5, 10)
- PJ Morton – keyboards (1–8, 10–15)
- Sam Farrar – bass (1, 2, 4, 6, 7, 10, 12, 15); backing vocals (2, 3, 12); percussion (2, 3, 6, 12, 13); production (2, 6), digital editing (2, 4, 12); keys (3, 6, 10); handclaps (5, 10); programming, drums (6); guitar (13)

Additional personnel

- The Arcade – songwriting, production (credited individually as Kurtis McKenzie and Jon Mills for songwriting)
- Afterhrs – production
- Nick Bailey – production
- Alex Ben-Abdallah – songwriting
- Ben Billions – production; add keyboards, programming (2)
- Benny Blanco – songwriting, production (credited as Benjamin Levin for songwriting)
- Julian Bunetta – songwriting, production; add. keyboards, programming (1)
- Dustin Bushnell – songwriting
- Cirkut – production; keyboards, add. vocals, programming (9)
- Diplo – programming (6); songwriting, production
- Jason Evigan – production; add. keyboards (4); guitar (9); add. vocals (9); programming (2, 4, 9)
- Victoria Evigan – add. vocals (9)
- Ian Franzino – songwriting
- Teddy Geiger – songwriting
- James Alan Ghaleb – songwriting
- Andrew Haas – songwriting
- Brittany Talia Hazzard – songwriting
- King Henry – songwriting, production (credited as Henry Agincourt Allen for songwriting); guitar, programming (6)
- Alexander Izquerdio – songwriting
- Jacob Kasher Hindlin – add. vocals (9); songwriting, production, executive production
- Kendrick Lamar – guest vocals, songwriting (credited as Kendrick Duckworth for songwriting)
- Louie Lastic – production
- LunchMoney Lewis – guest vocals (7); songwriting (credited as Gamal Lewis for songwriting)
- Ammar Malik – add. vocals (3); songwriting
- Julia Michaels – guest vocals (6); songwriting
- Ryan Ogren – production
- Oladayo Olatunji – songwriting
- OzGo – songwriting, production (credited as Oscar Görres for songwriting)
- Noah Passavoy – production; add keyboards (1, 2, 3, 6, 10); add. vocals (2, 3, 5, 9, 10); add. percussion (2, 3, 6); handclaps (5, 10); add. drums (6); programming (1, 6)
- Phil Paul – programming (5, 10); songwriting, production (credited as Phil Shaouy for songwriting)
- Victor Rådström – songwriting
- Charlie Puth – songwriting, production; keyboards, add. vocals, add. programming (4)
- Ricky Reed – songwriting, production; guitar, programming (7)
- ASAP Rocky – guest vocals (8); songwriting (credited as Rakim Mayers for songwriting)
- John Ryan – songwriting, production; guitar (3); add. vocals (1, 3, 5, 8, 10); programming (3, 8)
- Phil Shaouy – add. vocals (5, 10)
- Tinashe Sibanda – songwriting
- Starrah – add. vocals (2)
- Gian Stone – songwriting; programming (2); add. vocals (9)
- Elina Stridh – songwriting
- SZA – guest vocals (2); songwriting (credited as Solána Imani Rowe for songwriting)
- Shawn Tellez – add. percussion (3)
- TMS – songwriting, production (credited individually as Peter Kelleher, Tom Barnes, and Ben Kohn for songwriting)
- Justin Tranter – songwriting
- Randy Merrill – mastering
- Jared Watson – songwriting
- Isaiah Tejada – keyboards, synthesizers
- Kenneth Whalum – tenor saxophone (10)

=== Recording locations ===
- Conway Recording Studios (Los Angeles) – recording (tracks 1–14)
- MixStar Studios (Virginia Beach) – mixing (tracks 1–14)
- Westlake Recording Studios (Los Angeles) – recording (track 2)
- Chumba Meadows (Tarzana) – recording (tracks 2, 9)
- The Venice Studio (Venice, California) – recording (track 3)
- Electric Lady Studios (New York) – recording (track 6)
- Henson Recording Studios – recording (track 10)
- Wolf Cousins Studios (Stockhold, Sweden) – recording (track 11)
- Glenwood Place (California) – recording (track 13)
- Matzah Ball Studios (New York) – recording (track 13)
- Inner Child Records (London) – recording (track 13)
- Sterling Sound (New York) – mastering (tracks 1–14)

== Charts ==
=== Weekly charts ===
Weekly chart performance for Red Pill Blues
Chart (2017–2018)	Peak position
Australian Albums (ARIA)	7
Austrian Albums (Ö3 Austria)	31
Belgian Albums (Ultratop Flanders)	47
Belgian Albums (Ultratop Wallonia)	31
Canadian Albums (Billboard)	2
Czech Albums (ČNS IFPI)	8
Danish Albums (Hitlisten)	5
Dutch Albums (Album Top 100)	21
Finnish Albums (Suomen virallinen lista)	24
French Albums (SNEP)	24
German Albums (Offizielle Top 100)	44
Irish Albums (IRMA)	21
Italian Albums (FIMI)	15
Japan Download Albums (Billboard Japan)	2
Japanese Albums (Billboard Japan)	6
Japanese Albums (Oricon)	10
Latvian Albums (LaIPA)	12
New Zealand Albums (RMNZ)	6
Norwegian Albums (VG-lista)	8
Polish Albums (ZPAV)	33
Portuguese Albums (AFP)	21
Scottish Albums (Official Charts)	12
Slovak Albums (IFPI)	4
South Korean Albums (Circle)	19
South Korean International Albums (Circle)	1
Spanish Albums (Promusicae)	14
Swedish Albums (Sverigetopplistan)	12
Swiss Albums (Schweizer Hitparade)	21
UK Albums (Official Charts)	12
US Billboard 200	2

=== Year-end charts ===
2017 year-end chart performance for Red Pill Blues
Chart (2017)	Position
South Korean International Albums (Circle)	35

2018 year-end chart performance for Red Pill Blues
Chart (2018)	Position
Australian Albums (ARIA)	88
Canadian Albums (Billboard)	15
Danish Albums (Hitlisten)	31
French Albums (SNEP)	102
Swedish Albums (Sverigetopplistan)	40
US Billboard 200	22

2019 year-end chart performance for Red Pill Blues
Chart (2019)	Position
US Billboard 200	102

=== Decade-end charts ===
Decade-end chart performance for Red Pill Blues
Chart (2010–2019)	Position
US Billboard 200	153

== Certifications ==
Certifications for Red Pill Blues
Region	Certification	Certified units/sales
Australia (ARIA)	Platinum	70,000^{‡}
Austria (IFPI Austria)	Gold	7,500^{‡}
Brazil (Pro-Música Brasil)	2× Platinum	80,000^{‡}
Canada (Music Canada)	2× Platinum	160,000^{‡}
Denmark (IFPI Danmark)	Platinum	20,000^{‡}
France (SNEP)	Platinum	100,000^{‡}
India (IMI)	24× Platinum	720,000
Italy (FIMI)	Platinum	50,000^{‡}
New Zealand (RMNZ)	4× Platinum	60,000^{‡}
Poland (ZPAV)	2× Platinum	40,000^{‡}
Singapore (RIAS)	2× Platinum	20,000^{*}
Sweden (GLF)	Gold	20,000^{‡}
United Kingdom (BPI)	Gold	100,000^{‡}
United States (RIAA)	Platinum	1,000,000^{‡}
^{*} Sales figures based on certification alone.^{‡} Sales+streaming figures based on certification alone.
