= 2020 Tour =

The 2020 Tour may refer to:

- 2020 Tour (Bon Jovi)
- 2020 Tour (Guns N' Roses)
- 2020 Tour (Maroon 5)
