= Help Me Out =

2017 song performed by Maroon 5

Promotional single by Maroon 5 and Julia Michaels

from the album Red Pill Blues
- Released: October 6, 2017
- Recorded: July – August 2017
- Studio: Conway Recording Studios (Los Angeles, California)
- Genre: Pop
- Length: 3:13
- Label: 222; Interscope
- Songwriters: Adam Levine; Thomas Wesley Pentz; Henry Agincourt Allen; Julia Michaels; Justin Tranter
- Producers: Diplo; King Henry

Maroon 5 promotional singles chronology
"It Was Always You" (2014)	"Help Me Out" (2017)	"Whiskey" (2017)

Lyric video
- "Help Me Out" on YouTube

"Help Me Out" is a song by American band Maroon 5 and American singer-songwriter Julia Michaels. The song was released on October 6, 2017, as the first promotional single from the band's sixth studio album Red Pill Blues (2017), also as included the sixth track on the record.

== Composition ==
"Help Me Out" is a length of 3 minutes and 13 seconds. It was written and composed by Maroon 5 frontman Adam Levine, Julia Michaels, Thomas Wesley Pentz, King Henry and Justin Tranter. It was produced by Diplo and King Henry with Sam Farrar and Noah Passovoy as co-producers.

== Lyric video ==
On October 23, 2017, a lyric video was released on the band's official YouTube channel. It features the words flashing across the screen in neon lights.

== Track listing ==
Digital download
No.	Title	Length
1.	"Help Me Out" (with Julia Michaels)	3:13

== Personnel ==
Maroon 5

- Adam Levine – lead and backing vocals, songwriter
- Jesse Carmichael – keyboards, rhythm guitar, backing vocals
- Mickey Madden – bass
- James Valentine – lead guitar, backing vocals
- Matt Flynn – electronic drums, percussion
- PJ Morton – keyboards, synthesizer, backing vocals
- Sam Farrar – additional instrumentation, co-producer

Additional personnel

- Julia Michaels – featured artist, songwriter
- Diplo – songwriter, production
- King Henry – songwriter, production
- Justin Tranter – songwriter
- Noah Passovoy – co-producer

== Charts ==
Chart (2017)	Peak position
Australia (ARIA)	83
Canada Hot 100 (Billboard)	80
Canada (Canadian Digital Song Sales)	23
Croatia (HRT)	99
Czech Republic Singles Digital (ČNS IFPI)	58
Ireland (IRMA)	86
New Zealand Heatseekers (RMNZ)	3
Portugal (AFP)	73
Slovakia Singles Digital (ČNS IFPI)	70
South Korea International Chart (Gaon)	7
Sweden Heatseeker (Sverigetopplistan)	8
US Bubbling Under Hot 100 (Billboard)	18
US Digital Song Sales (Billboard)	46
Venezuela Pop General (Record Report)	41
Venezuela Rock General (Record Report)	10
Venezuela Anglo (Record Report)	22
