= If I'm Lucky (song) =

Single by Jason Derulo
- Released: September 1, 2017
- Recorded: 2017
- Genre: Pop
- Length: 3:32
- Label: Warner Bros.
- Songwriters: Jason Desrouleaux; Justin Tranter; Mattias Larsson; Robin Fredriksson
- Producer: Mattman & Robin

Jason Derulo singles chronology
"Swalla" (2017)	"If I'm Lucky" (2017)	"Tip Toe" (2017)

"If I'm Lucky" is a song by American singer and songwriter Jason Derulo, released on September 1, 2017. The song was written by Derulo and Justin Tranter, while the production was handled by Mattman & Robin.

== Background and release ==
While talking about the song in an interview with Billboard, Derulo said; "I love the emotional feeling bursting. The effect of the echo, it kind of sounds like I’m in an empty room. I think it sounds like nothing else I write. It’s an emotional song that you can dance to. And the subject matter I think is really cool, it’s one that has never been talked about -- having a love that fails in this life, but it was a love that was so good that maybe the love will work in the next life.". The official lyric video for "If I'm Lucky" was uploaded to Derulo's YouTube channel on September 1, 2017. It was inspired by Michael Jackson's "Thriller" music video and features Derulo dancing with zombie dancers.

== Music video ==
The music video for "If I'm Lucky" was directed by Hannah Lux Davis. On September 20, 2017, the video's trailer was uploaded to Derulo's YouTube channel. The full video premiered on September 22.

== Live performances ==
Derulo performed the song live for the first time on the Good Morning America show on September 1, 2017, and later performed it on Sounds Like Friday Night on October 27, 2017.

== Charts ==
Chart performance for "If I'm Lucky"
Chart (2017)	Peak position
Australia (ARIA)	59
Austria (Ö3 Austria Top 40)	39
Belgium (Ultratip Bubbling Under Flanders)	1
Belgium (Ultratip Bubbling Under Wallonia)	23
Canada Hot 100 (Billboard)	75
Czech Republic Singles Digital (ČNS IFPI)	76
France (SNEP)	167
Germany (GfK)	31
Hungary (Rádiós Top 40)	31
Hungary (Single Top 40)	35
Ireland (IRMA)	45
Lebanon (Lebanese Top 20)	18
Netherlands (Dutch Top 40)	33
Netherlands (Single Top 100)	57
New Zealand Heatseekers (RMNZ)	1
Portugal (AFP)	52
Romania (Airplay 100)	15
Scottish Singles Sales (Official Charts)	25
Slovakia Airplay (ČNS IFPI)	21
Slovakia Singles Digital (ČNS IFPI)	40
Spain (Promusicae)	29
Sweden (Sverigetopplistan)	54
Switzerland (Schweizer Hitparade)	77
UK Singles (Official Charts)	28

== Certifications ==
Certifications for "If I'm Lucky"
Region	Certification	Certified units/sales
Germany (BVMI)	Gold	200,000^{‡}
Netherlands (NVPI)	Gold	20,000^{‡}
New Zealand (RMNZ)	Platinum	30,000^{‡}
United Kingdom (BPI)	Silver	200,000^{‡}
^{‡} Sales+streaming figures based on certification alone.
