= Tip Toe (Jason Derulo song) =

2017 single by Jason Derulo

Single by Jason Derulo featuring French Montana
- Released: November 10, 2017
- Genre: Dancehall; EDM
- Length: 3:07
- Label: Warner Bros.
- Songwriters: Philip Kembo; Jason Desrouleaux; Soaky Siren; Karim Kharbouch; Tinashe Sibanda; Johnny Mitchell
- Producers: Pip Kembo; Bantu

Jason Derulo singles chronology
"If I'm Lucky" (2017)	"Tip Toe" (2017)	"1, 2, 3" (2018)

French Montana singles chronology
"Dirty Sexy Money" (2017)	"Tip Toe" (2017)	"Famous" (2017)

"Tip Toe" is a song by American singer and songwriter Jason Derulo, featuring Moroccan-American rapper French Montana, released on November 10, 2017. It was written alongside Soaky Siren, Johnny Mitchell, and producers Pip Kembo and Bantu. Critics noted that the song follows the same musical direction as Derulo's preceding single, "Swalla."

In February 2024, the song was included on Derulo's fifth studio album Nu King.

== Live performances ==
On April 12, 2018, Derulo performed the song live during a medley with "Swalla" and "Colors" at the German Echo Music Prize.

== Music video ==
A lyric video for "Tip Toe", purportedly directed by Derulo himself, was released on November 10, 2017 to accompany the release of the single. A follow-up, more elaborate official music video was then released on YouTube on December 7, 2017, at a total length of three minutes and thirty-seven seconds.

== Track listing ==
Digital download
No.	Title	Length
1.	"Tip Toe" (featuring French Montana)	3:07

== Charts ==
=== Weekly charts ===
Chart (2017–2018)	Peak position
Australia (ARIA)	81
Austria (Ö3 Austria Top 40)	25
Belarus Airplay (Eurofest)	10
Belgium (Ultratip Bubbling Under Flanders)	19
Belgium (Ultratip Bubbling Under Wallonia)	6
Canada Hot 100 (Billboard)	50
Colombia (National-Report)	99
Czech Republic Singles Digital (ČNS IFPI)	71
Finland (Suomen virallinen lista)	18
Germany (GfK)	11
Hungary (Single Top 40)	35
Hungary (Stream Top 40)	32
Ireland (IRMA)	12
Latvia (DigiTop100)	64
Netherlands (Single Top 100)	69
New Zealand Heatseekers (RMNZ)	1
Portugal (AFP)	59
Romania (Airplay 100)	8
Russia Airplay (Tophit)	7
Scottish Singles Sales (Official Charts)	7
Slovakia Singles Digital (ČNS IFPI)	52
Spain (PROMUSICAE)	69
Sweden (Sverigetopplistan)	66
Switzerland (Schweizer Hitparade)	22
UK Singles (Official Charts)	5

=== Year-end charts ===
Chart (2018)	Position
Germany (Official German Charts)	36
Iceland (Plötutíóindi)	56
Portugal (AFP)	139
Romania (Airplay 100)	17
UK Singles (Official Charts Company)	43

== Certifications ==
Region	Certification	Certified units/sales
Australia (ARIA)	Platinum	70,000^{‡}
Austria (IFPI Austria)	Platinum	30,000^{‡}
Canada (Music Canada)	2× Platinum	160,000^{‡}
Denmark (IFPI Danmark)	Gold	45,000^{‡}
Germany (BVMI)	Platinum	400,000^{‡}
Netherlands (NVPI)	Gold	20,000^{‡}
New Zealand (RMNZ)	Platinum	30,000^{‡}
Spain (Promusicae)	Gold	30,000^{‡}
United Kingdom (BPI)	Platinum	600,000^{‡}
United States (RIAA)	Gold	500,000^{‡}
^{‡} Sales+streaming figures based on certification alone.

== Release history ==
Region	Date	Format	Label	Ref.
United States	November 10, 2017	Digital download	Warner Bros.	
Italy	November 24, 2017	Contemporary hit radio	Warner	
