= Whiskey (Maroon 5 song) =

Promotional single by Maroon 5 featuring ASAP Rocky

from the album Red Pill Blues
- Released: October 20, 2017
- Recorded: June 2017
- Studio: Conway (Hollywood)
- Genre: Electro-R&B
- Length: 3:30
- Label: 222; Interscope
- Songwriters: Adam Levine; Rakim Mayers; John Ryan; Jacob Kasher Hindlin; Tinashe Sibanda
- Producers: Ryan; JKash; Fly-M

Maroon 5 promotional singles chronology
"Help Me Out" (2017)	"Whiskey" (2017)

Audio video
- "Whiskey" on YouTube

"Whiskey" is a song recorded by American band Maroon 5 featuring American rapper ASAP Rocky. It was released on October 20, 2017, as the second promotional single from the band's sixth studio album Red Pill Blues (2017). The song was written by Adam Levine, Rakim Mayers, John Ryan, Jacob Kasher Hindlin, and Tinashe Sibanda and was produced by John Ryan, Maxime Devaux and JKash.

== Composition ==
"Whiskey" has a duration of three minutes and 30 seconds, and was written and composed by Maroon 5 frontman Adam Levine, Rakim Mayers, John Ryan, Jacob Kasher Hindlin, Maxime Devaux (Fly-M) and Tinashe Sibanda. Production was handled by John Ryan and JKash and features American rapper ASAP Rocky. The track was recorded in June 2017 at Conway Recording Studios in Los Angeles, California.

== Credits and personnel ==
Maroon 5

- Adam Levine – lead vocals, rhythm guitar, songwriting, executive production
- Jesse Carmichael – keyboards, synthesizers, rhythm guitar, backing vocals
- Mickey Madden – bass
- James Valentine – lead guitar, backing vocals
- Matt Flynn – drums, percussion, electronic drums
- PJ Morton – keyboards, synthesizers, piano, backing vocals
- Sam Farrar – rhythm guitar, keyboards, synthesizers, samples, bass, backing vocals, programming, production

Additional Personnel

- ASAP Rocky – guest artist and songwriter
- John Ryan – producer, songwriter, keyboards, piano, synthesizer
- Jacob "JKash" Kasher Hindlin – producer, songwriter
- Fly-M – producer, disc jockey
- Tinashe Sibanda – songwriter, composer
- Noah "Mailbox" Passovoy – engineer
- Serban Ghenea – mixing engineer
- Tom Coyne – mastering

Recording

- Recorded at Conway Recording Studios, Los Angeles, California

== Charts ==
Chart (2017)	Peak position
Canada (Canadian Digital Song Sales)	46
New Zealand Heatseeker (RMNZ)	7
South Korea International Chart (Gaon)	22
Sweden Heatseeker (Sverigetopplistan)	15
US Digital Song Sales (Billboard)	47
