= MMXXI Tour =

2021 concert tour by Maroon 5

- Continental tour by Maroon 5
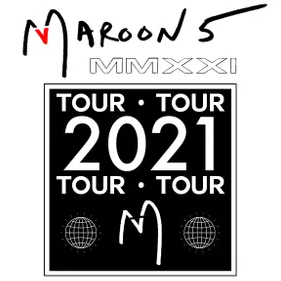
- Location: North America
- Associated album: Jordi
- Start date: August 10, 2021
- End date: December 31, 2021
- Legs: 1
- No. of shows: 35
- Box office: $32.6 million (30 shows)

Maroon 5 concert chronology
- 2020 Tour (2020); MMXXI Tour (2021); World Tour 2022 (2022)

The MMXXI Tour was the thirteenth headlining concert tour by American band Maroon 5. It began on August 10, 2021, in Auburn, Washington, and ended on December 31, 2021, in Las Vegas, comprising 35 concerts.

== Background ==
On November 11, 2019, Maroon 5 announced the 2020 Tour was revealed, which will take place in Latin America. The band confirmed more additional dates of the tour from November 19 and December 4, 2019, (with North America), respectively. Artists Meghan Trainor and Leon Bridges, were announced as opening acts in the North American leg in the summer. On May 15, 2020, the band announced all dates of North American leg has been postponed, due to the coronavirus pandemic. The rescheduled dates will be billed as the MMXXI Tour. In July 2020, Maroon 5 announced the dates of 2021 Tour, was revealed. This tour in support of the band's seventh studio album Jordi. The previous artists has since been replaced by Blackbear and Ava Max, as new openers to the band's 2021 Tour.

Depending on the state legislature, the event organizer required proof of COVID-19 vaccination or a negative diagnostic test within 48 hours prior to entry in addition to wearing a mask in order to attend Maroon 5's show.

== Shows ==
List of concerts (Note: All dates postponed due to the COVID-19 pandemic.)
Date (2021)	City	Country	Venue	Opening act
August 10	Auburn	United States	White River Amphitheatre	Blackbear; DJ Noah Passovoy
August 12	West Valley City	United States	USANA Amphitheatre	Blackbear; DJ Noah Passovoy
August 14	Albuquerque	United States	Isleta Amphitheater	Blackbear
August 16 (Note: The concert on August 16, 2021 in Dallas was part of the Nissan Concert Series.)	Dallas	United States	Dos Equis Pavilion	Blackbear; DJ Noah Passovoy
August 18	Maryland Heights	United States	Hollywood Casino Amphitheatre	Blackbear; DJ Noah Passovoy
August 19 (Note: The concert on August 19, 2021, in Milwaukee was part of the Summerfest 2021.)	Milwaukee	United States	American Family Insurance Amphitheater	Blackbear; DJ Noah Passovoy
August 21	Noblesville	United States	Ruoff Music Center	Blackbear; DJ Noah Passovoy
August 23	Clarkston	United States	DTE Energy Music Theatre	Blackbear; DJ Noah Passovoy
August 25	Burgettstown	United States	The Pavilion at Star Lake	Blackbear
August 26	Cuyahoga Falls	United States	Blossom Music Center	Blackbear
August 28	Cincinnati	United States	Riverbend Music Center	Blackbear; DJ Noah Passovoy
August 30	Chicago	United States	Wrigley Field	Ava Max; Blackbear
September 1	Darien	United States	Darien Lake Amphitheater	Blackbear; DJ Noah Passovoy
September 2	Toronto	Canada	Budweiser Stage	Blackbear
September 4	Camden	United States	BB&T Pavilion	Blackbear
September 5	Hershey	United States	Hersheypark Stadium	Ava Max; Blackbear
September 7 (Note: The concert on September 7, 2021, in Bristol was part of the Mattress Warehouse Concert Series.)	Bristow	United States	Jiffy Lube Live	Blackbear
September 8	Charlotte	United States	PNC Music Pavilion	Blackbear
September 10	Holmdel	United States	PNC Bank Arts Center	Blackbear
September 12	Boston	United States	Fenway Park	Ava Max; Blackbear
September 15	Raleigh	United States	Coastal Credit Union Music Park	Blackbear; DJ Noah Passovoy
September 18 (Note: The concerts on September 18 and 19, 2021, in Atlanta, were part of the 2021 Music Midtown festival.)	Atlanta	United States	Piedmont Park	—N/a
September 19	Atlanta	United States	Piedmont Park	—N/a
September 23	West Palm Beach	United States	ITHINK Financial Amphitheatre	Blackbear
September 24	Tampa	United States	MidFlorida Credit Union Amphitheatre	Blackbear
September 27 (Note: With Maroon 5 alone. Blackbear unable to perform due to a health problem.)	Austin	United States	Germania Insurance Amphitheater	DJ Noah Passovoy
September 28	The Woodlands	United States	Cynthia Woods Mitchell Pavilion	DJ Noah Passovoy
October 1	Phoenix	United States	Ak-Chin Pavilion	—N/a
October 2	Los Angeles	United States	Banc of California Stadium	Ava Max; Blackbear; DJ Noah Passovoy
October 5	Chula Vista	United States	North Island Credit Union Amphitheatre	Blackbear
October 7	Mountain View	United States	Shoreline Amphitheatre	Blackbear
October 8	Concord	United States	Concord Pavilion	Blackbear; DJ Noah Passovoy
October 23 (Note: The concert on October 23, 2021 in Los Angeles was part of Audacy's We Can Survive concert.)	Los Angeles	United States	Hollywood Bowl	—N/a
December 30 (Note: The concerts on December 30 and 31, 2021, in Las Vegas are part of Audacy's New Year's Eve Festival 2022.)	Las Vegas	United States	Cosmopolitan of Las Vegas	DJ Noah Passovoy
December 31	Las Vegas	United States	Cosmopolitan of Las Vegas	DJ Noah Passovoy

== Cancelled dates ==
List of cancelled concerts, showing date, city, country, venue and reason for cancellation
Date (2021)	City	Country	Venue	Reason	Ref.
March 9	Bogotá	Colombia	Parque Salitre Magico	COVID-19 pandemic	
July 21	Denver	United States	Ball Arena	COVID-19 pandemic	
August 13	Kansas City	United States	T-Mobile Center	COVID-19 pandemic	
August 14	Oklahoma City	United States	Chesapeake Energy Arena	COVID-19 pandemic	
August 18	North Little Rock	United States	Simmons Bank Arena	COVID-19 pandemic	
September 10	New York City	United States	Madison Square Garden	Scheduling conflict	
September 13	Saratoga Springs	United States	Saratoga Performing Arts Center	Scheduling conflict	
September 17 (Note: The show on September 17, 2021, in Las Vegas at T-Mobile Arena, as part of the 2021 iHeartRadio Music Festival, was cancelled due to scheduling conflict.)	Las Vegas	United States	T-Mobile Arena	Scheduling conflict	

== Accolades ==
Award	Year (Note: Indicates the year of ceremony. Each year is linked to the article about the awards held that year, wherever possible.)	Category	Result	Ref.
iHeartRadio Music Awards	2022	Favorite Tour Photographer (Travis Schneider)	Nominated	
Pollstar Awards	2022	Best Pop Tour	Won	
