= Swalla =

2017 song by Jason Derulo ft. Nicki Minaj and Ty Dolla Sign

Single by Jason Derulo featuring Nicki Minaj and Ty Dolla Sign
- Released: February 24, 2017
- Recorded: 2016
- Genre: Dancehall; EDM
- Length: 3:36
- Label: Warner Bros.
- Songwriters: Jason Desrouleaux; Onika Maraj; Tyrone Griffin Jr.; Eric Frederic; Gamal Lewis; Jacob Kasher Hindlin; Russell Jones; Robert Diggs
- Producer: Ricky Reed

Jason Derulo singles chronology
"Kiss the Sky" (2016)	"Swalla" (2017)	"If I'm Lucky" (2017)

Nicki Minaj singles chronology
"Run Up" (2017)	"Swalla" (2017)	"Make Love" (2017)

Ty Dolla $ign singles chronology
"Ain't Nothing" (2017)	"Swalla" (2017)	"It's a Vibe" (2017)

Music video
- "Swalla" on YouTube

"Swalla" is a song by the American singer Jason Derulo featuring Trinidadian rapper Nicki Minaj and fellow American singer Ty Dolla Sign with recently credited additional background vocals from American singer Madison Beer, released on February 24, 2017, by Warner Bros. Records. The song was written by the artists alongside LunchMoney Lewis, Robert Diggs, Jacob Kasher Hindlin, Russell Jones. and producer Ricky Reed. The song was originally intended to be the first single from Derulo's album, titled 777, however the album was never released. It was later included on his fifth studio album Nu King (2024).

== Background and release ==
Derulo previewed "Swalla" in a video posted in August 2016. He officially announced it as a single on January 2, 2017. "Swalla" premiered on February 23, 2017, and was released for download on iTunes Store the next day. While talking about the song on the red carpet of the 59th Grammy Awards, Derulo said:

"I never believe in forcing a collaboration. You know, I’m a fan of both of theirs and I thought that they fit the track perfectly. It’s one of those ones that’ll get you up and doing your thing. I feel like it’s gonna stick out on the radio. There’s nothing that sounds like it."

Parts of the chorus are created as an interpolation of Ol' Dirty Bastard's song "Shimmy Shimmy Ya".

On May 12, 2017, the trio released "Swalla (After Dark Remix)", a slow-paced acoustic remix of the original song. In an interview with The Fader, Derulo said about the remix: "It was so nice we had to do it twice! The original version is the ultimate club track, so the idea was to give people the flip side of the song. The subject matter and melody is so sexy, but you might miss the 'sexy' in all the fun of 'Swalla'. So, 'After Dark' is on the opposite side of the spectrum and is SURE to set the mood."

== Critical reception ==
Justin Ivey from XXL wrote that Minaj "comes through to close out the track with bars that steal the show". Joshua Espinoza of Complex wrote that "Jason and Ty handle their verses nicely, but Nicki is definitely the star", also saying that the song "definitely has potential". Rap-Up also praised Minaj's verse saying that she "anchors the track with a third and final verse that many will likely assume is another thinly-veiled jab at Remy Ma". Hilary Hughes from MTV News wrote that this is a "steamy number that has all three chiming in over a wobbly beat that would feel right at home on the floor of a beach club in the Caribbean". Kat Stevens of Freaky Trigger described the song as "[r]idiculous robo-dancehall with a Men At Work piccolo hook and the stupidest drum pattern I've heard in ages", adding: "It certainly stands out when played in the middle of a swamp of Ed Sheeran."

== Music video ==
On February 24, 2017, the official lyric video for "Swalla", directed by Alex Lockett, was uploaded to Derulo's YouTube channel. The music video premiered on March 17, 2017. As of August 2025, the music video has received over 1.8 billion views on YouTube.

== Live performances ==
Derulo and Ty$ performed the song live on The Tonight Show Starring Jimmy Fallon on April 6, 2017. Derulo and Minaj performed the song at the Billboard Music Awards on May 21, 2017. Derulo performed the song at the Opening Ceremony of Pakistan Super League 2018 on February 22, 2018. On April 12, 2018, Derulo performed the song live during a medley with "Tip Toe" and "Colors" at the German Echo Music Prize.

== Other appearance ==
This song is featured in Blackpink's In Your Area World Tour as the group member Lisa's solo dance number in Asia, North America and Europe setlist.

"Swalla" appeared as a dance evaluation song in Episode 6 of the South Korean idol survival show Produce X 101 as one of the dance evaluation songs alongside "Believer" by Imagine Dragons and "Finesse" by Bruno Mars and Cardi B.

== Track listing ==
- Digital download
1. "Swalla" (featuring Nicki Minaj and Ty Dolla Sign) – 3:36
- Digital download
1. "Swalla" (Wideboys Remix) (featuring Nicki Minaj and Ty Dolla Sign) – 3:16
- Digital download
1. "Swalla" (After Dark Remix) (featuring Nicki Minaj and Ty Dolla Sign) – 4:32

== Charts ==
=== Weekly charts ===
Weekly chart performance for "Swalla"
Chart (2017)	Peak position
Argentina Anglo (Monitor Latino)	9
Australia (ARIA)	17
Austria (Ö3 Austria Top 40)	9
Belgium (Ultratop 50 Flanders)	9
Belgium (Ultratop 50 Wallonia)	21
Brazil Airplay (Brasil Hot 100)	29
Bulgaria Airplay (PROPHON)	3
Canada Hot 100 (Billboard)	15
Canada CHR/Top 40 (Billboard)	43
CIS Airplay (TopHit)	194
Colombia (National-Report)	17
Czech Republic Airplay (ČNS IFPI)	67
Czech Republic Singles Digital (ČNS IFPI)	19
Denmark (Tracklisten)	24
Euro Digital Songs (Billboard)	6
Finland (Suomen virallinen lista)	10
France (SNEP)	6
France Airplay (SNEP)	3
Germany (GfK)	4
Greece Airplay (IFPI)	18
Greece Digital Songs (Billboard)	4
Guatemala (Monitor Latino)	14
Hungary (Dance Top 40)	7
Hungary (Rádiós Top 40)	20
Hungary (Single Top 40)	5
Hungary (Stream Top 40)	7
Ireland (IRMA)	9
Israel International Airplay (Media Forest)	1
Italy (FIMI)	14
Lebanon (Lebanese Top 20)	3
Luxembourg Digital Songs (Billboard)	9
Malaysia (RIM)	20
Mexico Airplay (Billboard)	10
Netherlands (Dutch Top 40)	6
Netherlands (Single Top 100)	5
New Zealand (Recorded Music NZ)	7
Norway (VG-lista)	12
Panama (Monitor Latino)	17
Paraguay (Monitor Latino)	3
Philippines (Philippine Hot 100)	9
Portugal (AFP)	4
Romania Airplay (Media Forest)	1
Scottish Singles Sales (Official Charts)	12
Slovakia Airplay (ČNS IFPI)	41
Slovakia Singles Digital (ČNS IFPI)	15
Spain (Promusicae)	9
Sweden (Sverigetopplistan)	8
Switzerland (Schweizer Hitparade)	14
UK Singles (Official Charts)	6
US Billboard Hot 100	29
US Pop Airplay (Billboard)	20
US Rhythmic Airplay (Billboard)	12

=== Year-end charts ===
2017 year-end chart performance for "Swalla"
Chart (2017)	Position
Argentina (Monitor Latino)	72
Australia (ARIA)	68
Austria (Ö3 Austria Top 40)	19
Belgium (Ultratop Flanders)	44
Belgium (Ultratop Wallonia)	53
Brazil (Pro-Música Brasil)	82
Bulgaria (PROPHON)	9
Canada (Canadian Hot 100)	36
Denmark (Tracklisten)	52
France (SNEP)	26
Germany (Official German Charts)	11
Hungary (Dance Top 40)	17
Hungary (Rádiós Top 40)	43
Hungary (Single Top 40)	30
Hungary (Stream Top 40)	18
Israel International Airplay (Media Forest)	5
Italy (FIMI)	29
Latvia Airplay (LaIPA)	90
Netherlands (Dutch Top 40)	38
Netherlands (Single Top 100)	12
New Zealand (Recorded Music NZ)	27
Portugal (AFP)	10
Romania (Airplay 100)	5
Spain (PROMUSICAE)	29
Sweden (Sverigetopplistan)	32
Switzerland (Schweizer Hitparade)	37
UK Singles (OCC)	19
US Billboard Hot 100	85

2018 year-end chart performance for "Swalla"
Chart (2018)	Position
Hungary (Dance Top 40)	40

== Certifications ==
Certifications and sales for "Swalla"
Region	Certification	Certified units/sales
Australia (ARIA)	3× Platinum	210,000^{‡}
Austria (IFPI Austria)	2× Platinum	60,000^{‡}
Belgium (BRMA)	Platinum	20,000^{‡}
Brazil (Pro-Música Brasil)	Diamond	250,000^{‡}
Canada (Music Canada)	6× Platinum	480,000^{‡}
Denmark (IFPI Danmark)	Platinum	90,000^{‡}
France (SNEP)	Diamond	233,333^{‡}
Germany (BVMI)	2× Platinum	800,000^{‡}
Italy (FIMI)	3× Platinum	150,000^{‡}
Netherlands (NVPI)	3× Platinum	120,000^{‡}
New Zealand (RMNZ)	4× Platinum	120,000^{‡}
Poland (ZPAV)	2× Platinum	100,000^{‡}
Portugal (AFP)	2× Platinum	20,000^{‡}
Spain (Promusicae)	3× Platinum	120,000^{‡}
United Kingdom (BPI)	2× Platinum	1,200,000^{‡}
United States (RIAA)	2× Platinum	2,000,000^{‡}
^{‡} Sales+streaming figures based on certification alone.
