= Tinashe Sibanda =

Zimbabwean record producer and songwriter

- Born: Harare, Zimbabwe
- Other names: T-Collar; Bantu
- Occupations: Record producer; songwriter; musician
- Years active: 2010s–present
- Musical career
- Also known as: T-Collar; Bantu
- Genres: Pop music; Afropop; R&B

Tinashe Sibanda, known professionally as Bantu and formerly as T-Collar, is a Zimbabwean record producer, songwriter and musician based in the United States. His songwriting and production credits include recordings by Rita Ora, Fifth Harmony, Kevin Gates, Maroon 5, Jason Derulo, J Balvin, Camila Cabello and Pitbull.

Sibanda co-wrote and produced "Hey Ma", recorded by Pitbull and J Balvin featuring Camila Cabello for The Fate of the Furious: The Album. The Spanish-language version was nominated for Best Urban Song at the 18th Annual Latin Grammy Awards.

== Early life and education ==
Sibanda was born in Harare, Zimbabwe. He became interested in music production while growing up in Zimbabwe and began making beats at the age of 13, working from his mother's living room. As a teenager, he spent much of his time making music.

After finishing high school in Zimbabwe, Sibanda moved to the United States to study music. He attended Full Sail University, where he studied recording arts and graduated in 2012. His musical influences include Zimbabwean musician Oliver Mtukudzi and American artists and producers Missy Elliott and Pharrell Williams.

== Career ==
=== Songwriting and production ===
Sibanda began his professional career using the name T-Collar. In 2015, Sibanda worked on Fifth Harmony's debut studio album, Reflection, co-writing "Them Girls Be Like". He also co-wrote and co-produced Rita Ora's "Body on Me", featuring Chris Brown. His work during this period also included collaborations with Swedish artists Elliphant and Sabina Ddumba.

Sibanda produced "Know Better" by Kevin Gates for the 2016 soundtrack album Suicide Squad: The Album. The album was nominated for the Grammy Award for Best Compilation Soundtrack for Visual Media.

In 2017, Sibanda co-wrote and produced "Hey Ma", recorded by Pitbull and J Balvin featuring Camila Cabello for The Fate of the Furious: The Album. The Spanish-language version received a nomination for Best Urban Song at the 18th Annual Latin Grammy Awards, giving Sibanda a Latin Grammy nomination as one of the songwriters. His songwriting credits that year also included "Whiskey", recorded by Maroon 5 featuring ASAP Rocky for Red Pill Blues, and "Tip Toe" by Jason Derulo featuring French Montana.

=== Bantu ===
Sibanda began releasing his own music under the name Bantu, a name connected to his Zimbabwean background. His recordings as Bantu draw on music from Zimbabwe as well as pop, hip-hop and other contemporary styles.

He has worked with Zimbabwean-American singer and songwriter Shungudzo and Zimbabwean producer Philip "Dr. Chaii" Kembo. Bantu and Dr. Chaii collaborated on Coming to America Vol. 1 and released the single "Jackie Chan" in 2018.

As Bantu, Sibanda has released songs including "Holiday", "Roll with Me", "Leaving" and "Habibi". He has continued to work as a songwriter and producer for other artists while releasing his own music. Bantu began experimenting with beats at age 13 and later developed a musical style combining electronic club music, hip-hop, African music and reggae. He has described his fashion style as "afro-streetwear", influenced by modern streetwear and fashion of the 1980s and early 1990s.

== Musical style and influences ==
Sibanda has cited Zimbabwean musician Oliver Mtukudzi and American producers Missy Elliott and Pharrell Williams as influences on his production style. His recordings as Bantu combine African musical influences with pop, hip-hop, electronic dance music and reggae.

== Selected songwriting and production credits ==
Year	Artist	Recording	Credit
2015	Fifth Harmony	"Them Girls Be Like"	Songwriter
2015	Rita Ora featuring Chris Brown	"Body on Me"	Songwriter, producer
2016	Kevin Gates	"Know Better"	Producer
2017	Pitbull and J Balvin featuring Camila Cabello	"Hey Ma"	Songwriter, producer
2017	Maroon 5 featuring ASAP Rocky	"Whiskey"	Songwriter
2017	Jason Derulo featuring French Montana	"Tip Toe"	Songwriter

== Awards and nominations ==
Year	Award	Category	Work	Result
2017	Latin Grammy Awards	Best Urban Song	"Hey Ma"	Nominated
