= Cxloe =

Australian singer

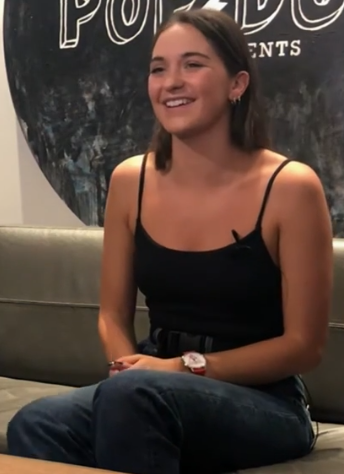
- Performing in 2018

Background information
- Birth name: Chloe Papandrea
- Born: 23 November 1994 (age 30) Sydney, New South Wales, Australia
- Genres: Pop; electropop; dark pop
- Occupation: Singer
- Instrument: Vocals
- Years active: 2014–present
- Labels: Sandlot; AWAL
- Website: cxloe.com

Chloe Papandrea (born 23 September 1994), known professionally as Cxloe (stylized in all caps), is an Australian singer-songwriter from Sydney, New South Wales.

Cxloe's debut single "Tough Love" was released in 2017, and her debut extended play, Heavy, Pt. 1, was released on 16 October 2020. Sonically, her music is generally pop, electropop, and dark pop. Cxloe currently resides in the Northern Beaches, New South Wales, with her fiancé Dan Lakajev.

On 17 May 2024, Cxloe released her debut studio album Shiny New Thing.

== Career ==
=== 2014–2019: The X Factor and early singles ===
Papandrea rose to prominence auditioning for the sixth season of The X Factor in 2014. She managed to reach the home visits stage, where she was eliminated. The following year, she auditioned for a second time, but only managed to reach the Chair Challenge this time round.

She is best known for her breakout single "Show You", which was co-written and produced by Sam Farrar of Maroon 5.

In 2019, she supported Maroon 5 on their Red Pill Blues Tour. and released the singles "I Can't Have Nice Things" and "Low Blow".

=== 2020–2021: Heavy, Pt. 1 ===
On 16 October 2020, Papandrea released her debut EP, Heavy, Pt. 1. The same day, she performed a cover of the Cranberries' song "Zombie" for Triple J's Like a Version segment, alongside a performance of her track "12 Steps".

On 7 May 2021, Papandrea released "Cry & Drive", the lead single from her second release. On 20 August 2021, Papandrea released "Soft Rock"; co-written with Eric Leva in Los Angeles in 2019, Cxloe described the track in a press statement as chronicling her first heartbreak and channeling "Kelly Clarkson, side fringes, iPods, low rise jeans and Paramore".

In December 2022, Papandrea released "Till the Wheels Fall Off". Written during 2020 during COVID lockdown, according to Cxloe, it's a bit of a "psychotic, obsessive love song, [and] was inspired from a deeply personal relationship."

=== 2022–present: Shiny New Thing ===
In February 2024, Cxloe announced the released of her debut album, Shiny New Thing for May 2024. The album was proceeded by the singles "Till the Wheels Fall Off", "Cheating On Myself", "Flight Risk", "Stretch", "Chloe Enough", "No Service" and "Shapeshifter" released between 2022 and 2024. Rolling Stone Australia gave the album a positive review saying, it "feels lived in thanks to addictive choruses and memorable hooks".

== Personal life ==
Prior to the COVID-19 pandemic, Papandrea split her time between Sydney, Australia and Los Angeles. Papandrea and her Fiancé of 11 years Dan Lakajev, moved into a house in the Northern Beaches, Sydney, in early 2020. The pair became engaged on 20 February 2021.

== Musical style and influences ==
Papandrea's musical style has been described as pop, electropop, and dark pop.

== Discography ==
=== Albums ===
List of albums, with release date and label shown
Title	Albu details
Shiny New Thing	Released: 17 May 2024; Label: Cxloe, Independent Co.; Formats: LP, Digital download, streaming

=== Extended plays ===
List of EPs, with release date and label shown
Title	EP details
Heavy, Pt. 1	Released: 16 October 2020; Label: Sandlot, AWAL; Formats: Digital download, streaming
New Trick	Released: 5 November 2021; Label: Sandlot, AWAL; Formats: Digital download, streaming

=== Singles ===
==== As lead artist ====
List of singles as lead artist, with year released, selected chart positions, and album name shown
Title	Year	Peak chart positions	Album
Title	Year	NZ Hot	Album
"Tough Love"	2017	—	Non-album singles
"Monster"	2018	—	Non-album singles
"Show You"	2018	—	Non-album singles
"I Can't Have Nice Things"	2019	18	Non-album singles
"Low Blow"	2019	33	Non-album singles
"Sick" (with Gnash)	2019	—	Non-album singles
"Devil You Don't"	2019	—	Non-album singles
"12 Steps"	2020	—	Heavy, Pt. 1
"One and Lonely"	2020	—	Heavy, Pt. 1
"Heavy"	2020	—	Heavy, Pt. 1
"Swing"	2020	—	Heavy, Pt. 1
"Cry and Drive"	2021	—	Non-album single
"Soft Rock"	2021	—	New Trick
"Close"	2021	—	New Trick
"New Trick"	2021	—	New Trick
"Till the Wheels Fall Off"	2022	—	Shiny New Thing
"Cheating On Myself"	2023	—	Shiny New Thing
"Flight Risk"	2023	—	Shiny New Thing
"Stretch"	2023	—	Shiny New Thing
"Chloe Enough"	2024	—	Shiny New Thing
"No Service"	2024	—	Shiny New Thing
"Shapeshifter"	2024	—	Shiny New Thing
"Good Luck, Babe!" (Triple J, Like a version)	2024	—	

==== As featured artist ====
List of singles as featured artist, with year released, selected chart positions, and album name shown
Title	Year	Album
"Secrets" (Max Styler featuring Cxloe)	2017	Non-album singles
"Sicklaced" (Super Cruel featuring Cxloe)	2017	Non-album singles
"Ain't the Same" (Lost Kings featuring Cxloe)	2019	Non-album singles
"Love Me Now" (SACHI featuring Cxloe)	2019	Non-album singles
"Between Our Hearts" (Cheat Codes featuring Cxloe)	2020	Hellraisers, Pt. 1
"Worst Case" (3lau featuring Cxloe)	2021	Non-album single

== Concert tours ==
Cxloe has supported Broods, Carmouflage Rose, King Princess and Maroon 5. In May 2019, she embarked on her own headline tour.

== Awards and nominations ==
=== Rolling Stone Australia Awards ===
The Rolling Stone Australia Awards are awarded annually in January or February by the Australian edition of Rolling Stone magazine for outstanding contributions to popular culture in the previous year.

Year	Nominee / work	Award	Result	Ref.
2022	Cxloe	Rolling Stone Readers' Choice Award	Nominated	
