= Behati Prinsloo =

Namibian model (born 1988)

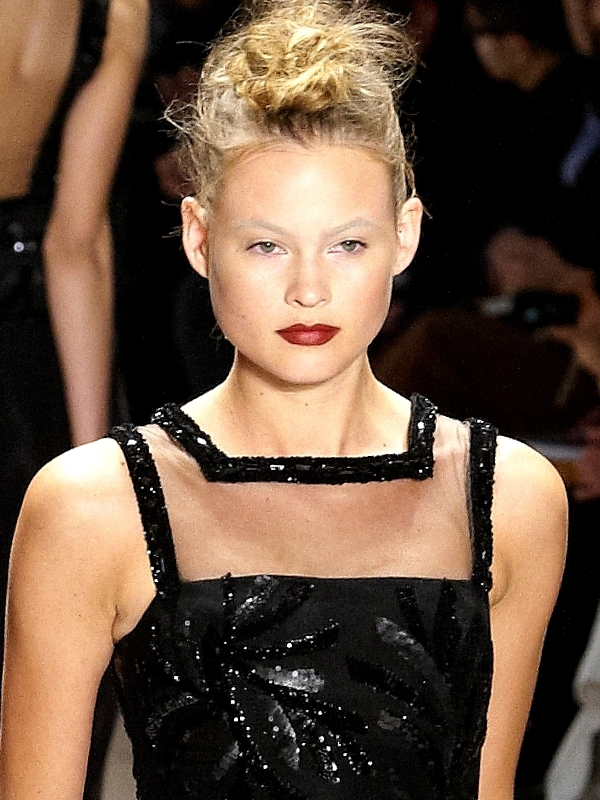
- Prinsloo in Georges Chakra in 2010
- Born: 16 May 1988 (age 38); Grootfontein, South West Africa, South Africa (present-day Namibia)
- Other name: Behati Prinsloo Levine
- Occupation: Model
- Years active: 2006–present
- Spouse: Adam Levine (m. 2014)
- Children: 3
- Modeling information
- Height: 5 ft 11 in (1.80 m)
- Hair color: Light Brown
- Eye color: Hazel
- Agency: Elite Model Management (New York); Women Management (Paris, Milan); Storm Management (London)

Behati Prinsloo (/biˈɑːti ˈprɪnsluː/ bee-AH-tee PRIN-sloo, Afrikaans: [ˈbɛɦati ˈprənsluə]; born 16 May 1988) is a Namibian (Note: At the time she was born, Namibia was still called South West Africa and under the jurisdiction of South Africa. As such, she has been described as being "South African-born".) model. In 2008, she became a Pink contract model, and moved on to become a Victoria's Secret Angel in 2009. She walked in thirteen Victoria's Secret Fashion Shows (2007–2015; 2018; 2024–present), and opened consecutive Victoria's Secret Fashion shows in 2014 and 2015.

== Early life ==
Prinsloo was born on 16 May 1988 in Grootfontein, Namibia (then part of South West Africa). She is the only child of her father, Boet Prinsloo, who is a church minister. Her mother, Magda (née Rossouw), runs a bed and breakfast. Behati was raised speaking Afrikaans, having only learned English during her schooling and through meeting more English speakers as she grew up. She attended Grootfontein Secondary School, leaving after grade 9 to pursue modelling.

Her modeling career 'began' when she was discovered vacationing in Cape Town, with her grandparents. Prinsloo recalled: "We went to the grocery store after church and this guy came up to me and asked if I was a model and wrote his number on a piece of paper...".

== Career ==
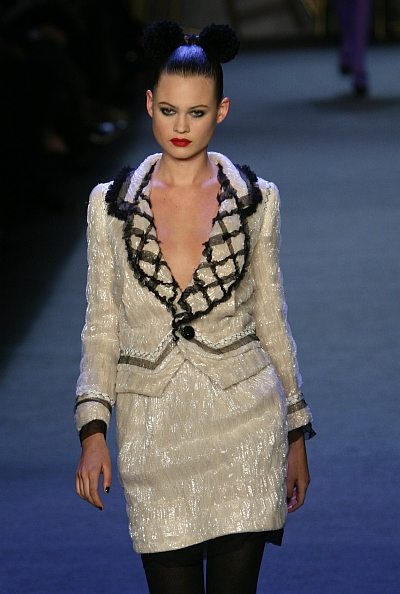
Prinsloo in 2008

Prinsloo debuted as a Prada/Miu Miu Exclusive. Soon after, Juergen Teller photographed her for her debut ad campaign, Marc by Marc Jacobs, and she soon was photographed by Mario Testino and Paolo Roversi for British Vogue and David Sims for W Magazine.

Prinsloo has walked in fashion shows for Alexander Wang, Louis Vuitton, Miu Miu, Versace, and other brands.

She has been on the covers of Vogue Spain, Vogue Turkey, Vogue Brasil, Vogue Mexico, Vogue Russia, Vogue Thailand, Elle France, Elle Spain, Elle Italia, Elle Sweden, L'Officiel Netherlands, Marie Claire Greece, Marie Claire South Africa, i-D Magazine, V Magazine, Russh Magazine, 10 Magazine, The Edit, Jalouse, and So It Goes Magazine.

Her ad campaigns include I Love Juicy Couture Fragrance, I Am Juicy Couture Fragrance, Juicy Couture Black Label, Tommy Hilfiger, Alexander Wang 'Do Something', T by Alexander Wang, Marc by Marc Jacobs, H&M, Nina Ricci, The Gap, Aquascutum, M Missoni, Sportmax, DKNY Jeans, Pepe Jeans, Lancaster, Stefanel, Esprit, Lacoste, Desigual, Seafolly, Nine West, and Raw Spirit Fragrance.

In 2010, Prinsloo designed "Behati Loves Pink" swimsuit capsule collection for Victoria's Secret. In 2014, she designed a line of denim for THVM. Most recently, she designed a fashion and accessories collection for Juicy Couture. Models.com ranks Prinsloo on their lists of 'The Top Sexiest Models' as well as their list of 'The Money Girls'.

The night before the 4 December 2012 airing of the annual Victoria's Secret Fashion Show, Prinsloo and fellow Victoria's Secret models Jacquelyn Jablonski and Jasmine Tookes guest starred on the 3 December "Ha'awe Make Loa" episode of CBS' Hawaii Five-0 playing themselves. In June 2014, Prinsloo made a cameo appearance in a preview of Missy Elliott protégée Sharaya J's "Shut It Down" via a T by Alexander Wang campaign. Prinsloo appeared in various music videos such as The Virgins' "Rich Girls" and Maroon 5's "Animals", "Girls Like You", and "All Night".

After taking a two-year hiatus from the Victoria's Secret Fashion show, Prinsloo returned to walk in the brand's 2018 show.

Prinsloo was among the models and celebrities who made appearances modeling lingerie at Rihanna's Savage x Fenty Vol. 3 fashion show in 2021.

== Philanthropy ==
Prinsloo embarked on a charitable trip following the 2010 Haiti earthquake. Partnering with LakayPam, an organization dedicated to helping children in developing nations meet their basic needs, she collected and delivered hundreds of letters of hope from all over the world and helped raise funds. She was accompanied by a cameraman and his friend, and the resulting short film, Letters to Haiti, debuted 7 December 2011 at Milk Gallery in New York.

She also supports Save the Rhino Trust, an organization trying to protect the black rhinoceros, a critically endangered species native to Namibia and other countries in Southern Africa.

== Personal life ==
In 2012, Prinsloo began dating American musician Adam Levine of the group Maroon 5; they married in Mexico in 2014. They have two daughters (b. 2016 and 2018) and a son (b. 2023).

She is close friends with fellow models Candice Swanepoel and Lily Aldridge. Prinsloo appeared in the 2018 Maroon 5 video "Girls Like You," along with husband Levine and their daughter Dusty Rose. Five years later, they appeared again along with Gio Grace in "Middle Ground" by the band, and again appeared in the music video of "All Night" (second lead single of Maroon 5's 2025 album Love Is Like) who lip-syncs the song in place of Levine, who plays on his saxophone.

In 2021, Levine and Prinsloo founded Calirosa, a line of California red wine barrel-aged tequila.

== Filmography ==
Year	Title	Role	Notes
2008	The City	Herself	Episode: "If She Can Make It Here..."
2011	Letters to Haiti	Herself	Short film
2012	Hawaii Five-0	Herself	Episode: "Ha'awe Make Loa"
2014	Fashion Police	Herself	Episode: "Fash Fabness" (guest)
2015–2016	Victoria's Secret Swim Special	Herself	Television special (seasons 1 & 2)
2015	Taylor Swift: The 1989 World Tour Live	Herself	Concert film
2016	Popstar: Never Stop Never Stopping	Herself	Cameo
2021	Savage X Fenty Show: Vol. 3	Herself	Television special
2022	Victoria's Secret: Angels and Demons	Herself	Television documentary series; 3 episodes (archive footage)

=== Music videos ===
Year	Title	Artist(s)	Ref.
2009	"Rich Girls"	The Virgins	
2014	"Animals"	Maroon 5	
2015	"Hands to Myself" (Victoria's Secret version)	Selena Gomez	
2016	"Body Moves" (Victoria's Secret verson)	DNCE	
2017	"Cold"	Maroon 5 featuring Future	
2018	"Girls Like You" (Original, Volume 2 and Vertical Video versions)	Maroon 5 featuring Cardi B	
2018	"Wait" (Snapchat version)	Maroon 5	
2021	"Lost"	Maroon 5	
2023	"Middle Ground"	Maroon 5	
2025	"All Night"	Maroon 5	
