= Girls Like You =

2018 single by Maroon 5

Single by Maroon 5 featuring Cardi B

from the album Red Pill Blues
- Released: May 31, 2018
- Recorded: 2017
- Studio: Conway (Los Angeles, California)
- Genre: Pop; pop rock
- Length: 3:56 (Cardi B version); 3:35 (album version)
- Label: 222; Interscope
- Songwriters: Adam Levine; Henry Walter; Belcalis Almanzar; Brittany Talia Hazzard; Jason Evigan; Gian Stone
- Producers: Cirkut; Jason Evigan

Maroon 5 singles chronology
"Wait" (2018)	"Girls Like You" (2018)	"Memories" (2019)

Cardi B singles chronology
"I Like It" (2018)	"Girls Like You" (2018)	"Ring" (2018)

Music video
- "Girls Like You (feat. Cardi B)" on YouTube

"Girls Like You" is a song recorded by American band Maroon 5 from their sixth studio album Red Pill Blues (2017). The track was written by lead singer Adam Levine, Starrah, Gian Stone, Cirkut, and Jason Evigan, with the latter two serving as producers. A second version featuring and co-written by American rapper Cardi B was released on May 31, 2018, through 222 and Interscope Records, as the album's fifth and final single. The single version was included on the re-release edition of the album.

The song's accompanying music video was directed by David Dobkin, which features the band and Levine performing the song in the center of a room and a number of women making their appearances. Its music video has surpassed 4 billion views on YouTube.

"Girls Like You" reached number one on twelve national record charts. It spent seven weeks at number one on the US Billboard Hot 100 chart. This made it Maroon 5's fourth and Cardi B's third chart-topper, who extended her record for most number-ones among female rappers. It also spent 33 weeks in the top 10, tying both Ed Sheeran's "Shape of You" and Post Malone and Swae Lee's "Sunflower" for the longest top 10 run at the time and a record-setting 36 weeks at number one on the Adult Contemporary chart.

"Girls Like You" won multiple awards, including at the 2019 Billboard Music Awards for Top Hot 100 Song, and received a nomination for Best Pop Duo/Group Performance at the 61st Grammy Awards. It was ranked at 30 on Billboard's Greatest Hot 100 Hits of All Time, published in November 2021.

== Background ==
"Girls Like You" was released as the ninth track on Red Pill Blues via Apple Music. On May 30, 2018, Maroon 5 announced a new version of the song with rapper Cardi B, as the fifth and final single from the album, following the song "Wait", which was later released on iTunes, the next day. The band released four remix versions of "Girls Like You" on August 2, 2018, featuring St. Vincent, Tokimonsta, Cray and WondaGurl. In an interview with Variety, Levine stated he told Cardi before she wrote her verse, "I want you to put something down that shows your fierceness as a woman and say it however you want."

== Composition ==
"Girls Like You" is a pop and pop rock song. It has a length of three minutes and 35 seconds in the original version, while the extended single version is 20 seconds longer. It was written by Adam Levine, Cirkut, Cardi B, Starrah, Jason Evigan and Gian Stone and was produced by Cirkut and Evigan.

== Critical reception ==
“Girls Like You” received mostly negative reviews from critics. Shaad D'Souza of Vice wrote, "Maroon 5, please don't ruin Cardi B," described the song as an example of "God awful, horrid, weird, marshmallow-soft songs sung by dudes pining after a ‘good girl’ who will finally fix all of their problems through the power of love", and deemed Cardi B's verse the best and only interesting part of the song, which he considered "basically the antithesis of Adam Levine's whole weird muscular robot thing."

Time staff called it "more headache than hit" but acknowledged "Cardi B's verse as the only saving grace" of the song.

Spin staff described it as "profoundly shallow" as well as a "snoozefest, which trafficks [sic] in sentimental and borderline meaningless platitudes" and stated "[the song] dominated the charts thanks in no small part to walking charisma factory Cardi B."

== Commercial performance ==
"Girls Like You" debuted at number 94 on the US Billboard Hot 100, and ascended to number four following its first full week of tracking after the music video's arrival. The single made the fourth-biggest jump (90 positions) in the Hot 100's history, and became Maroon 5's 14th and Cardi B's sixth top-ten single overall. After spending six weeks at number two behind Drake's "In My Feelings", the single reached number one on its 17th charting week, becoming Maroon 5's fourth chart topper–their first since 2012's "One More Night"–and Cardi B's third. Cardi extended her record for most number ones among female rappers. Maroon 5 became the duo or group with the most Hot 100 number ones in the 21st century.

"Girls Like You" became the first pop song to lead the chart after the record run of 34 consecutive weeks that rap songs had ruled the Hot 100, from January to September 2018. The single spent seven weeks atop the Hot 100, making Cardi the female rapper with the most cumulative weeks atop the chart, with eleven weeks. With 33 weeks in the top 10, it tied Ed Sheeran's "Shape of You" for the longest top 10 run in the chart's archives. Also tied by Post Malone and Swae Lee's "Sunflower" in 2019, with the record was later broken by Malone's "Circles" in 2020, and The Weeknd's "Blinding Lights" in 2021. "Girls Like You" also spent 36 consecutive weeks at number one on the Adult Contemporary, breaking the record of the longest-running number one, previous held by Uncle Kracker's 2003 version of "Drift Away" for 28 weeks. (Note: In 2024, the record was broken by Miley Cyrus's "Flowers".) "Girls Like You" ended up being the fifth best-performing entry on the Billboard Hot 100 of the 2010s, with Cardi B being the only female rapper on the top 40.

With "Girls Like You" following "I Like It" at the top of Radio Songs, Cardi B became the first female rapper to ever replace herself at number one on that chart. With 16 weeks on top, it tied Mariah Carey's "We Belong Together" and No Doubt's "Don't Speak" for the second longest-leading number one on the Radio Songs chart, while matching Carey for the longest leading this century. With the single, the band scored its record-extending 13th number one on the Adult Top 40 radio airplay chart.

The song was certified diamond by the Recording Industry Association of America (RIAA) in 2021 for selling more than 10 million units, with Cardi B becoming the first female rapper to achieve two diamond certifications. According to the International Federation of the Phonographic Industry (IFPI) it was the fifth-best selling song of 2018, with equivalent sales of 11.9 million units globally.

== Music video ==
A screenshot of the music video showing part of the cast of women featured. An article of Billboard noted "the female-empowerment message of the video is loud and clear."

The music video premiered on YouTube, on May 31, 2018, at midnight 12AM (EDT). Directed by David Dobkin and cinematographed by Claudio Miranda, it follows Adam Levine, alone with a microphone in the center of a room, the band playing instruments in the background, then a rotating assortment of women doing lip-syncing and dancing to the song around with Levine. The video featured appearances from Maroon 5's band members: guitarist James Valentine, keyboardist and rhythm guitarist Jesse Carmichael, bassist Mickey Madden, drummer Matt Flynn, keyboardist PJ Morton and multi-instrumentalist Sam Farrar, with the song's featured artist Cardi B.

In order of appearance, the video includes a number of women ranging from athletes, activists, actresses, models and singers who are making their cameos: Camila Cabello, Phoebe Robinson, Aly Raisman, Sarah Silverman, Gal Gadot, Lilly Singh, Amani al-Khatahtbeh, Trace Lysette, Tiffany Haddish, Angy Rivera, Franchesca Ramsey, Millie Bobby Brown, Ellen DeGeneres, Jennifer Lopez, Chloe Kim, Alex Morgan, Mary J. Blige, Beanie Feldstein, Jackie Fielder, Danica Patrick, Ilhan Omar, Elizabeth Banks, Ashley Graham and Rita Ora, concluding with Levine's wife Behati Prinsloo and their daughter Dusty Rose.

The clothing worn by the guests of the music video features several messages that represent various social justice and identity movements. Immigrant rights activist Angy Rivera of New York State Youth Leadership Council wears her organization's T-shirt with the phrase "Undocumented Unafraid Unapologetic". Olympic gymnast Aly Raisman wore a T-shirt with the phrase "Always Speak Your Truth". Jackie Fielder, founder of indigenous-led San Francisco Defund DAPL Coalition, wore a T-shirt with the words "Divest, Water Is Life".

"Girls Like You" topped YouTube's 2018 Songs of the Summer list globally, and ranked third in the United States. It is also Vevo's most viewed video of 2018, and was placed at No. 3 on YouTube's Top 10 music videos of 2018, respectively. The video was named the 23rd-most iconic pop music video of the 2010s by PopSugar.

=== Alternative videos ===
Two alternate versions of the video were released, both directed by Dobkin. The first version is a vertical video which was released exclusively on Spotify, on August 27, 2018. Similar to the original video, it focuses on the same women singing and dancing in rotation, with the exception of Cabello. The second version, simply titled Volume 2, was released on October 16, 2018, on YouTube. This version includes additional footage and Cabello. The video ends with the voice of Dobkin saying "cut" and the sound of people clapping. In the second half of Volume 2, Levine briefly wears a t-shirt with the words "Liberation Not Deportation", created by the organization, NYSYLC. On September 6, 2024, Volume 2 reached 1 billion views on YouTube. As of April 2026, both the original and Volume 2 music videos of "Girls Like You" have received a combined 5 billion views on YouTube.

=== Lyric video ===
The band released a lyric video of the original song on February 14, 2019 (Valentine's Day). The animated video follows Adam Levine's journey growing up, becoming a musician, forming the band now known as Maroon 5 and performing a sold-out concert. Levine is shown driving with various women in his car then spending time alone and focusing on his music. Finally, he meets and falls in love with Behati Prinsloo. They date, get married, and start a family at the end.

== Live performances ==
On May 30, 2018, Maroon 5 performed "Girls Like You" for the first time in Tacoma, Washington from the Red Pill Blues Tour, where they also performed a cover version of "Forever Young" by Alphaville, as a tribute to their late manager Jordan Feldstein. On February 3, 2019, the band performed this song in Atlanta, Georgia and featuring the Georgia State University marching band known as Panther Band at the Super Bowl LIII halftime show, while Cardi B also performed a solo version of the song for Bud Light Super Bowl Music Fest, the night before.

On March 30, 2021, Maroon 5 performed the song in a virtual concert as part of the American Express Unstaged series. The band continued with the song for their residency titled Maroon 5: The Las Vegas Residency and the 2024 North American Summer Tour, respectively. In July 2026, Maroon 5 played "Girls Like You" and serving as headliner for the 2026 BST Hyde Park concert at Hyde Park, London.

== Awards and nominations ==
Awards and nominations for "Girls Like You"
Year	Ceremony	Category	Result	Ref.
2018	E! People's Choice Awards	Music Video of the Year	Longlisted	
2018	MTV Video Music Awards	Song of Summer	Nominated	
2018	MTV Video Play Awards	Winning Video	Won	
2018	Norwegian GAFFA Awards	Best Foreign Song	Nominated	
2018	NRJ Music Awards	International Song of the Year	Won	
2018	NRJ Music Awards	Video of the Year	Nominated	
2018	Teen Choice Awards	Choice Summer Song	Nominated	
2019	ASCAP Pop Music Awards	Award Winning Song	Won	
2019	ASCAP Pop Music Awards	Publisher of the Year (Sony/ATV)	Won	
2019	Billboard Music Awards	Top Hot 100 Song	Won	
2019	Billboard Music Awards	Top Streaming Song (Video)	Nominated	
2019	Billboard Music Awards	Top Collaboration	Won	
2019	Billboard Music Awards	Top Radio Song	Won	
2019	Billboard Music Awards	Top Selling Song	Won	
2019	BMI Pop Awards	Award Winning Song	Won	
2019	Grammy Awards	Best Pop Duo/Group Performance	Nominated	
2019	iHeartRadio Music Awards	Song of the Year	Nominated	
2019	iHeartRadio Music Awards	Best Music Video	Nominated	
2019	iHeartRadio Music Awards	Best Lyrics	Nominated	
2019	iHeartRadio Music Awards	Best Collaboration	Nominated	
2019	iHeartRadio Titanium Awards	1 Billion Total Audience Spins on iHeartRadio Stations	Won	
2019	Hito Music Awards	Best Western Song	Won	
2019	Myx Music Awards	Favorite International Video	Nominated	
2019	Nickelodeon Kids' Choice Awards	Favorite Collaboration	Nominated	
2019	RTHK International Pop Poll Awards	Top 10 International Gold Song	Won	
2019	Webby Awards	Music Video (Video) – Honoree	Shortlisted	

== Track listing ==
Digital download – Original

1. "Girls Like You" – 3:35

Digital download – Remix

1. "Girls Like You" (featuring Cardi B) – 3:55

Digital download – Cray Remix

1. "Girls Like You" (Cray remix) (featuring Cardi B) – 3:57

Digital download – St. Vincent Remix

1. "Girls Like You" (St. Vincent remix) (featuring Cardi B) – 3:31

Digital download – Tokimonsta Remix

1. "Girls Like You" (Tokimonsta remix) (featuring Cardi B) – 3:33

Digital download – WondaGurl Remix

1. "Girls Like You" (WondaGurl remix) – 3:35

== Credits and personnel ==
Credits adapted from AllMusic and Tidal.

Maroon 5

- Adam Levine – lead vocals, acoustic guitar, songwriting, executive production

Additional personnel

- Cardi B – featured vocals, songwriter
- Cirkut – producer, songwriter, keyboards, backing vocals, programming
- Jason Evigan – producer, songwriter, programming, additional guitars, keyboards
- Noah Passavoy – recording, additional keyboards, backing vocals
- Isaiah Tejada – keyboards, synths
- Gian Stone – songwriter, backing vocals
- Starrah – songwriter
- Serbian Ghenea – mixing

Recording

- Recorded at Conway Recording Studios, Los Angeles, California

== Charts ==
=== Weekly charts ===
Chart (2018–2020)	Peak position
Argentina Anglo (Monitor Latino)	2
Australia (ARIA)	2
Austria (Ö3 Austria Top 40)	8
Belgium (Ultratop 50 Flanders)	5
Belgium (Ultratop 50 Wallonia)	2
Bolivia (Monitor Latino)	3
Brazil (Top 100 Brasil)	58
Canada Hot 100 (Billboard)	1
Canada AC (Billboard)	1
Canada CHR/Top 40 (Billboard)	1
Canada Hot AC (Billboard)	1
CIS Airplay (TopHit)	67
Chile Anglo (Monitor Latino)	1
Croatia (HRT)	1
Colombia (National-Report)	149
Czech Republic Airplay (ČNS IFPI)	2
Czech Republic Singles Digital (ČNS IFPI)	3
Denmark (Tracklisten)	9
El Salvador (Monitor Latino)	10
Euro Digital Song Sales (Billboard)	4
Finland (Suomen virallinen lista)	16
France (SNEP)	7
Germany (GfK)	9
Global 200 (Billboard)	138 (Note: The Global 200 was introduced in September 2020, a year after the end of the song's initial popularity.)
Greece (IFPI)	3
Hungary (Rádiós Top 40)	2
Hungary (Single Top 40)	2
Hungary (Stream Top 40)	3
Iceland (Tónlistinn)	1
Ireland (IRMA)	5
Israel Top Songs International (Media Forest)	1
Italy (FIMI)	5
Italian Airplay (EarOne)	3
Japan Hot 100 (Billboard)	55
Lebanon (OLT20)	1
Malaysia (RIM)	1
Mexico Airplay (Billboard)	24
Netherlands (Dutch Top 40)	17
Netherlands (Single Top 100)	18
New Zealand (Recorded Music NZ)	1
Norway (VG-lista)	9
Panama (Monitor Latino)	9
Paraguay Anglo (Monitor Latino)	2
Peru Anglo (Monitor Latino)	3
Poland Airplay (ZPAV)	3
Portugal (AFP)	4
Puerto Rico (Monitor Latino)	13
Romania (Airplay 100)	1
Russia Airplay (TopHit)	73
Scottish Singles Sales (Official Charts)	4
Singapore (RIAS)	1
Slovakia Airplay (ČNS IFPI)	1
Slovakia Singles Digital (ČNS IFPI)	1
Slovenia (SloTop50)	2
South Korea Download International (Gaon)	25
Spain (Promusicae)	23
Sweden (Sverigetopplistan)	14
Switzerland (Schweizer Hitparade)	4
UK Singles (Official Charts)	7
US Billboard Hot 100	1
US Adult Contemporary (Billboard)	1
US Adult Pop Airplay (Billboard)	1
US Dance Club Songs (Billboard)	29
US Dance Airplay (Billboard)	3
US Pop Airplay (Billboard)	1
US Radio Songs (Billboard)	1
US Rhythmic Airplay (Billboard)	21
Venezuela Anglo (Record Report)	1
Venezuela Pop (Record Report)	11

=== Year-end charts ===
Chart (2018)	Position
Argentina (Monitor Latino)	66
Australia (ARIA)	8
Austria (Ö3 Austria Top 40)	13
Belgium (Ultratop Flanders)	16
Belgium (Ultratop Wallonia)	4
Canada (Canadian Hot 100)	6
CIS (Tophit)	195
Croatia (HRT)	33
Denmark (Tracklisten)	31
Estonia (IFPI)	22
France (SNEP)	26
Germany (Official German Charts)	25
Hungary (Rádiós Top 40)	30
Hungary (Single Top 40)	13
Hungary (Stream Top 40)	9
Iceland (Tónlistinn)	9
Ireland (IRMA)	18
Italy (FIMI)	24
Netherlands (Dutch Top 40)	65
Netherlands (Single Top 100)	42
New Zealand (Recorded Music NZ)	8
Poland (ZPAV)	29
Portugal (AFP)	16
Romania (Airplay 100)	18
Spain (PROMUSICAE)	55
South Korea International (Gaon)	64
Sweden (Sverigetopplistan)	34
Switzerland (Schweizer Hitparade)	14
Taiwan (Hito Radio)	19
UK Singles (Official Charts Company)	26
US Billboard Hot 100	10
US Adult Contemporary (Billboard)	13
US Adult Top 40 (Billboard)	5
US Mainstream Top 40 (Billboard)	3
US Radio Songs (Billboard)	5
Chart (2019)	Position
Argentina (Monitor Latino)	33
Australia (ARIA)	73
Belgium (Ultratop Flanders)	93
Canada (Canadian Hot 100)	15
CIS (Tophit)	97
Chile (Monitor Latino)	86
Costa Rica (Monitor Latino)	80
France (SNEP)	130
Honduras (Monitor Latino)	86
Hungary (Rádiós Top 40)	38
Iceland (Tónlistinn)	93
Portugal (AFP)	102
Romania (Airplay 100)	46
Russia Airplay (Tophit)	93
Slovenia (SloTop50)	21
South Korea (Gaon)	186
UK Singles (Official Charts Company)	87
US Billboard Hot 100	22
US Adult Contemporary (Billboard)	1
US Adult Top 40 (Billboard)	16
US Mainstream Top 40 (Billboard)	42
US Radio Songs (Billboard)	12
US Rolling Stone Top 100	76
Venezuela (Monitor Latino)	100
Chart (2020)	Position
Slovenia (SloTop50)	48

=== Decade-end charts ===
Chart (2010–2019)	Position
US Billboard Hot 100	5

=== All-time charts ===
Chart (Note: As of November 2021)	Position
US Billboard Hot 100	30

== Certifications ==
Region	Certification	Certified units/sales
Australia (ARIA)	13× Platinum	910,000^{‡}
Belgium (BRMA)	Gold	20,000^{‡}
Brazil (Pro-Música Brasil)	6× Diamond	960,000^{‡}
Canada (Music Canada)	9× Platinum	720,000^{‡}
Denmark (IFPI Danmark)	2× Platinum	180,000^{‡}
France (SNEP)	Diamond	333,333^{‡}
Germany (BVMI)	Platinum	400,000^{‡}
Italy (FIMI)	3× Platinum	150,000^{‡}
Mexico (AMPROFON)	2× Platinum+Gold	150,000^{‡}
New Zealand (RMNZ)	7× Platinum	210,000^{‡}
Nigeria (RCN)	Gold	2,500
Poland (ZPAV)	Diamond	250,000^{‡}
Portugal (AFP)	3× Platinum	30,000^{‡}
Spain (Promusicae)	2× Platinum	80,000^{‡}
United Kingdom (BPI)	3× Platinum	1,800,000^{‡}
United States (RIAA)	Diamond	10,000,000^{‡}
Streaming
Sweden (GLF)	Platinum	8,000,000^{†}
^{‡} Sales+streaming figures based on certification alone.^{†} Streaming-only figures based on certification alone.

== Release history ==
Release dates and formats for "Girls Like You"
Region	Date	Format(s)	Version	Label(s)	Ref.
Various	May 31, 2018	Digital download; streaming	Single	222; Interscope	
United States	June 4, 2018	Hot adult contemporary	Single	222; Interscope	
United States	June 5, 2018	Contemporary hit radio	Single	222; Interscope	
Italy	June 22, 2018	Contemporary hit radio	Single	Universal	
United Kingdom	July 20, 2018	Digital download; streaming	Single; original	Polydor	
Various	August 2, 2018	Digital download; streaming	Cray Remix	222; Interscope	
Various	August 2, 2018	Digital download; streaming	St. Vincent Remix	222; Interscope	
Various	August 2, 2018	Digital download; streaming	Tokimonsta Remix	222; Interscope	
Various	August 2, 2018	Digital download; streaming	WondaGurl Remix	222; Interscope	

== See also ==
- List of Airplay 100 number ones of the 2010s
- List of Billboard Hot 100 number-one singles of 2018
- List of Canadian Hot 100 number-one singles of 2018
- List of number-one songs of 2018 (Malaysia)
- List of number-one songs of 2018 (Singapore)
- List of Billboard Adult Contemporary number ones of 2018 and 2019 (U.S.)
- List of most liked YouTube videos
- List of most-viewed YouTube videos
- List of highest-certified singles in Australia
