= Wait (Maroon 5 song) =

2018 single by Maroon 5

Single by Maroon 5

from the album Red Pill Blues
- Released: January 16, 2018
- Recorded: 2017
- Studio: Conway Recording (Los Angeles, California)
- Genre: Electropop; R&B
- Length: 3:10
- Label: 222; Interscope
- Songwriters: Adam Levine; John Ryan; Jacob Kasher Hindlin; Ammar Malik
- Producer: John Ryan

Maroon 5 singles chronology
| "What Lovers Do" (2017) | "Wait" (2018) | "Girls Like You" (2018) |

Music video
- "Wait" on YouTube

"Wait" is a song by American pop rock band Maroon 5. It was released on January 16, 2018, to contemporary hit radio by 222 and Interscope Records, as the fourth single from the band's sixth studio album Red Pill Blues (2017). The song was previously released as a promotional single on October 31, 2017. It was written by Adam Levine, John Ryan, Jacob Kasher Hindlin, and Ammar Malik and was produced by Ryan. It served as the third countdown single released from the album following "Whiskey". Critical reception for the song was largely positive, with many critics and fans praising its catchy pop sound, smooth production, and effective use of Adam Levine's falsetto, calling it a highlight of Red Pill Blues.

== Background and release ==
"Wait" was announced on October 30, 2017. The song was released as an instant-grant the following day worldwide. On November 3, 2017, guitarist James Valentine later announced on Twitter, that the song would later become the album's official fourth single.

== Remixes ==
The remix versions of the song was released, the first version by Canadian duo Chromeo on January 19, 2018, and the second version featuring American rapper A Boogie wit da Hoodie on January 26.

== Composition ==
"Wait" has a duration of 3 minutes and 10 seconds. It was written by Maroon 5 frontman Adam Levine, John Ryan, Jacob "JKash" Kasher Hindlin, and Ammar Malik and was produced by John Ryan.

== Music video ==
The music video for "Wait" was released on February 8, 2018, on Vevo. The video features actress Alexandra Daddario and was directed by Dave Meyers. It begins with lead singer Adam Levine at the church as he wakes up in a coffin and walks to another coffin, where a funeral is being held, there he used the scorpion to resurrect his ex-girlfriend (played by Daddario) who the one cheated on him. The scorpion stings her, and a man watching punches Levine in the face as the latter falls to the ground. Scenes of Levine getting attacked and fought by the ex-girlfriend include the women gangsters and a bathtub woman. In the next scene, Levine is underwater from another world with little mermaids and soon enters the junkyard with the ex-girlfriend watching him as millions of meteors destroy the place, blowing the ex-girlfriend away. In the final scene, the ex-girlfriend drives away and leaves Levine at the house with him covered in ropes, and the video ends.

=== Snapchat version video ===
On January 16, 2018, a Snapchat version video was released on Spotify and on Vevo, the following day. Directed by Travis Schneider, and was shot on iPhone 7. This video drew inspiration from the 2016 music video "Hell No" by Ingrid Michaelson, and follows Levine in various parts at his home, as he performs in lip-syncing to the song with scenes covered by different Snapchat filters. Levine's wife, Behati Prinsloo makes a cameo appearance.

=== Lyric videos ===
A vertical lyric video was released exclusively by Spotify on December 15, 2017. Like the Snapchat video, which was also directed by Schneider and features Levine, is writing the lyrics on a screen wall. On February 1, 2018, the official lyric video is directed and produced by the band's multi-instrumentalist Sam Farrar. It was shot entirely on iPhone X.

== Live performances ==
On November 7, 2017, Maroon 5 performed "Wait" for the first time at the iHeartRadio Theater in Burbank, California. On January 18, 2018, the band continued the song for Jimmy Kimmel Live!, as well as the 2018 iHeartRadio Music Awards on March 11. Pop band Echosmith, praised their latter performance as "one of the best sounding tv performances". Later, Maroon 5 played with the song live on The Voice on April 24 and The Ellen DeGeneres Show on May 7, 2018, respectively.

== Accolades ==
| Year | Ceremony | Category | Result | Ref. |
|---|---|---|---|---|
| 2018 | MTV Video Music Awards | Best Visual Effects | Nominated | |
| 2018 | Teen Choice Awards | Choice Song: Group | Nominated | |
| 2019 | ASCAP Pop Music Awards | Award Winning Song | Won | |
| 2019 | BMI Pop Awards | Award Winning Song | Won | |

== Track listing ==
Digital download
| No. | Title | Length |
|---|---|---|
| 1. | "Wait" | 3:10 |

Digital download – Chromeo Remix
| No. | Title | Length |
|---|---|---|
| 1. | "Wait" (Chromeo Remix) | 4:19 |

Digital download – Remix featuring A Boogie wit da Hoodie
| No. | Title | Length |
|---|---|---|
| 1. | "Wait" (Remix) (featuring A Boogie wit da Hoodie) | 3:10 |

== Credits and personnel ==
Recording

- Recorded at Conway Recording Studios, Los Angeles, California

Personnel

- John Ryan – composition, production, keyboards, piano, synthesizer
- Ammar Malik – composition
- Adam Levine – lead vocals, songwriter
- James Valentine – lead and rhythm guitar
- Jesse Carmichael – keyboards, synthesizer
- Mickey Madden – bass guitar
- Matt Flynn – drums, percussion, electronic percussion
- PJ Morton – keyboards, synthesizer
- Sam Farrar – audio engineering
- Noah "Mailbox" Passovoy – engineering
- Jacob "JKash" Kasher Hindlin – composition
- Serban Ghenea – mix engineering
- Tom Coyne – mastering

== Charts ==
=== Weekly charts ===
| Chart (2017–2018) | Peak position |
|---|---|
| Argentina Anglo (Monitor Latino) | 11 |
| Australia (ARIA) | 91 |
| Belgium (Ultratip Bubbling Under Flanders) | 9 |
| Belgium (Ultratip Bubbling Under Wallonia) | 4 |
| Canada Hot 100 (Billboard) | 35 |
| Canada AC (Billboard) | 4 |
| Canada CHR/Top 40 (Billboard) | 12 |
| Canada Hot AC (Billboard) | 8 |
| Croatia International Airplay (Top lista) | 74 |
| Czech Republic Singles Digital (ČNS IFPI) | 47 |
| Hungary (Rádiós Top 40) | 15 |
| Ireland (IRMA) | 82 |
| Latvia (DigiTop100) | 52 |
| Latvia (Latvijas Top 40) | 34 |
| New Zealand Heatseekers (RMNZ) | 7 |
| Poland Airplay (ZPAV) Chromeo Remix | 12 |
| Portugal (AFP) | 74 |
| Slovakia Airplay (ČNS IFPI) | 68 |
| Slovakia Singles Digital (ČNS IFPI) | 49 |
| South Korea International (Gaon) | 16 |
| Sweden (Sverigetopplistan) | 57 |
| UK Singles (Official Charts) | 79 |
| US Billboard Hot 100 | 24 |
| US Adult Contemporary (Billboard) | 10 |
| US Adult Pop Airplay (Billboard) | 4 |
| US Dance Airplay (Billboard) | 8 |
| US Pop Airplay (Billboard) | 5 |
| Venezuela Anglo (Record Report) | 3 |
| Venezuela Rock (Record Report) | 1 |

| Chart (2025) | Peak position |
|---|---|
| Philippines Hot 100 (Billboard Philippines) | 21 |

=== Year-end charts ===
| Chart (2018) | Position |
|---|---|
| Canada (Canadian Hot 100) | 85 |
| US Billboard Hot 100 | 58 |
| US Adult Contemporary (Billboard) | 28 |
| US Adult Top 40 (Billboard) | 14 |
| US Dance/Mix Show Airplay (Billboard) | 39 |
| US Mainstream Top 40 (Billboard) | 28 |

== Certifications ==
| Region | Certification | Certified units/sales |
|---|---|---|
| Australia (ARIA) | Platinum | 70,000^{‡} |
| Brazil (Pro-Música Brasil) | Platinum | 40,000^{‡} |
| Canada (Music Canada) | Platinum | 80,000^{‡} |
| New Zealand (RMNZ) | Platinum | 30,000^{‡} |
| United Kingdom (BPI) | Silver | 200,000^{‡} |
| United States (RIAA) | 3× Platinum | 3,000,000^{‡} |
^{‡} Sales+streaming figures based on certification alone.

== Release history ==
| Region | Date | Format(s) | Version | Label(s) | Ref. |
|---|---|---|---|---|---|
| Various (Note: Release as a promotional single.) | October 31, 2017 | Digital download | Original | 222; Interscope | |
| United States | January 16, 2018 | Contemporary hit radio | Original | 222; Interscope | |
| Various | January 19, 2018 | Digital download | Chromeo Remix | 222; Interscope | |
| Various | January 26, 2018 | Digital download | A Boogie wit da Hoodie Remix | 222; Interscope | |
