= Cold (Maroon 5 song) =

Single by Maroon 5 featuring Future

from the album Red Pill Blues
- Released: February 14, 2017
- Recorded: 2016
- Genre: Electronic; tropical pop; Afrobeats
- Length: 3:54 (album version); 3:34 (original version)
- Label: 222; Interscope
- Songwriters: Adam Levine; John Ryan; Jacob Kasher Hindlin; Justin Tranter; Phil Shaouy
- Producers: J Kash; Phil Paul; John Ryan

Maroon 5 singles chronology
"Don't Wanna Know" (2016)	"Cold" (2017)	"What Lovers Do" (2017)

Future singles chronology
"Everyday" (2017)	"Cold" (2017)	"Draco" (2017)

Music video
- "Cold" on YouTube

"Cold" is a song by American band Maroon 5 featuring American rapper Future. It was released on February 14, 2017, through 222 and Interscope Records, as the second single from the band's sixth studio album Red Pill Blues (2017), included on both the deluxe and Japanese editions of the album. The song peaked at number 16 on the US Billboard Hot 100 chart.

== Recording ==
"Cold" was written and produced by Phil Shaouy, John Ryan, and Jacob Kasher Hindlin, and was co-written by Adam Levine and Justin Tranter.

== Music video ==
A music video for "Cold" was filmed in Los Angeles in December 2016 and was released on the day after the single, on Vevo. It features Levine's wife Behati Prinsloo and was directed by accomplished director Rich Lee. Set in downtown Los Angeles, the video follows with Levine receiving a call for an invite to Future's party, with him reluctant to go, but agrees. He then gets a call from his wife to buy milk on the way home. The track begins when he arrives at the party. When Levine orders a glass of wine, the bartender adds a hallucinogen. He begins to see people as animals, strange figures, and imaginary beings. Levine is then pulled into a threesome with two girls who appear to be horses. He later sees guitarist James Valentine being fellated by a woman in a chicken costume (an apparent reference to The Shining), and a police officer arrives, who morphs into a cartoon stripper. The video shows bizarre cartoon drawings and fuzzy images during Future's verse. Future and Levine are then shown talking to each other, with Levine looking at a hallucination of two old women to his left. Future then appears to turn into a teddy bear, and a female bodybuilder throws Levine into a pool. Levine sees an underwater wedding, before the video circles around to everything he had seen back in time until he finally gets home to put the milk back in the fridge. He then tells his wife everything that happened and goes to bed.

== Live performances ==
Maroon 5 performed "Cold" on television for the first time in The Ellen DeGeneres Show on February 15, 2017. Its first live performance was on the Milwaukee stop of their world tour on February 20. Later, they also performed the song on The Tonight Show Starring Jimmy Fallon on March 14, 2017.

== Track listing ==
Digital download

1. "Cold" (featuring Future) – 3:54

Digital download – Remix

1. "Cold" (Remix) (featuring Future & Gucci Mane) – 3:38

Digital download – Sak Noel Remix

1. "Cold" (Sak Noel Remix) (featuring Future) – 3:45

Digital download – R3hab & Khrebto Remix

1. "Cold" (R3hab & Khrebto Remix) (featuring Future) – 2:51

Digital download – Kaskade & Lipless Remix

1. "Cold" (Kaskade & Lipless Remix) (featuring Future) – 3:33

Digital download – Hot Shade & Mike Perry Remix

1. "Cold" (Hot Shade & Mike Perry Remix) (featuring Future) – 3:44

Digital download – Ashworth Remix

1. "Cold" (Ashworth Remix) (featuring Future) – 4:02

Digital download – Maesic Remix

1. "Cold" (Maesic Remix) (featuring Future) – 3:48

== Personnel ==
Credited adapted from Red Pill Blues album credits and album liner.

Maroon 5

- Adam Levine – lead vocals, rhythm guitar, songwriting
- Jesse Carmichael – rhythm guitar, backing vocals
- James Valentine – lead guitar, backing vocals
- Matt Flynn – electronic drums, percussion
- PJ Morton – keyboards, backing vocals
- Sam Farrar – bass guitar, samples

Additional personnel

- Noah Passovoy – keyboards, additional production
- Future – guest vocals
- Jacob Kasher Hindlin – production, songwriting
- Phil Shaouy – production, songwriting
- John Ryan – production, songwriting, additional guitars
- Justin Tranter – songwriting

== Charts ==
=== Weekly charts ===
Chart (2017)	Peak position
Argentina Anglo Airplay (Monitor Latino)	9
Australia (ARIA)	27
Austria (Ö3 Austria Top 40)	42
Belgium (Ultratop 50 Flanders)	33
Belgium (Ultratop 50 Wallonia)	21
Brazil Hot 100 Airplay (Billboard Brasil)	4
Canada Hot 100 (Billboard)	12
Canada AC (Billboard)	20
Canada CHR/Top 40 (Billboard)	7
Canada Hot AC (Billboard)	9
CIS Airplay (TopHit)	92
Colombia Airplay (National-Report)	71
Croatia International Airplay (Top lista)	7
Czech Republic Airplay (ČNS IFPI)	12
Czech Republic Singles Digital (ČNS IFPI)	13
Denmark (Tracklisten)	19
Finland (Suomen virallinen lista)	16
France (SNEP)	37
Germany (GfK)	43
Hungary (Rádiós Top 40)	16
Hungary (Single Top 40)	31
Ireland (IRMA)	21
Italy (FIMI)	13
Japan Hot 100 (Billboard)	53
Lebanon (Lebanese Top 20)	6
Malaysia (RIM)	12
Mexico Airplay (Billboard)	15
Netherlands (Dutch Top 40)	26
Netherlands (Single Top 100)	36
New Zealand (Recorded Music NZ)	29
Norway (VG-lista)	28
Paraguay Airplay (Monitor Latino)	16
Poland Airplay (ZPAV)	14
Portugal (AFP)	5
Russia Airplay (Tophit)	63
Scottish Singles Sales (Official Charts)	19
Slovakia Airplay (ČNS IFPI)	40
Slovakia Singles Digital (ČNS IFPI)	10
Slovenia Airplay (SloTop50)	40
South Korea International (Gaon)	1
Spain (Promusicae)	27
Sweden (Sverigetopplistan)	25
Switzerland (Schweizer Hitparade)	30
UK Singles (Official Charts)	24
Ukraine Airplay (TopHit)	87
US Billboard Hot 100	16
US Adult Contemporary (Billboard)	22
US Adult Pop Airplay (Billboard)	5
US Dance Club Songs (Billboard)	45
US Pop Airplay (Billboard)	8
Venezuela Anglo Airplay (Record Report)	3

=== Year-end charts ===
Chart (2017)	Position
Belgium (Ultratop Wallonia)	74
Brazil (Pro-Música Brasil)	93
Canada (Canadian Hot 100)	62
Croatia International Airplay (Top lista)	62
Denmark (Tracklisten)	99
France (SNEP)	192
Hungary (Stream Top 40)	56
Italy (FIMI)	66
Latvia Airplay (LaIPA)	30
Poland Airplay (ZPAV)	80
Portugal (AFP)	34
US Billboard Hot 100	69
US Adult Contemporary (Billboard)	49
US Adult Top 40 (Billboard)	22
US Mainstream Top 40 (Billboard)	38

== Certifications ==
Region	Certification	Certified units/sales
Australia (ARIA)	2× Platinum	140,000^{‡}
Brazil (Pro-Música Brasil)	Diamond	250,000^{‡}
Canada (Music Canada)	3× Platinum	240,000^{‡}
Denmark (IFPI Danmark)	Platinum	90,000^{‡}
France (SNEP)	Gold	66,666^{‡}
Germany (BVMI)	Gold	200,000^{‡}
Italy (FIMI)	2× Platinum	100,000^{‡}
New Zealand (RMNZ)	Platinum	30,000^{‡}
Poland (ZPAV)	Gold	25,000^{‡}
Portugal (AFP)	2× Platinum	20,000^{‡}
Spain (Promusicae)	Gold	20,000^{‡}
United Kingdom (BPI)	Platinum	600,000^{‡}
United States (RIAA)	Platinum	1,000,000^{‡}
^{‡} Sales+streaming figures based on certification alone.

== Release history ==
Region	Date	Format	Version	Label(s)	Ref.
Various	February 14, 2017	Digital download; streaming	Original	222; Interscope	
Italy	February 17, 2017	Contemporary hit radio	Original	Universal	
United States	February 21, 2017	Contemporary hit radio	Original	222; Interscope	
Various	March 24, 2017	Digital download	Hot Shade & Mike Perry Remix	222; Interscope	
Various	April 14, 2017	Digital download	Ashworth Remix	222; Interscope	
Various	April 14, 2017	Digital download	Maesic Remix	222; Interscope	
Various	April 14, 2017	Digital download	Sak Noel Remix	222; Interscope	
Various	May 5, 2017	Digital download	Gucci Mane Remix	222; Interscope	
Various	May 5, 2017	Digital download	Kaskade & Lipless Remix	222; Interscope	
Various	May 5, 2017	Digital download	R3hab & Khrebto Remix	222; Interscope	
