= Don't Wanna Know =

Single by Maroon 5 featuring Kendrick Lamar

from the album Red Pill Blues
- Released: October 11, 2016
- Genre: Tropical house
- Length: 3:34 (album version/no rap version); 4:25 (extended version)
- Label: 222; Interscope
- Songwriters: Kendrick Duckworth; Adam Levine; Benjamin Levin; John Ryan; Jacob Kasher Hindlin; Ammar Malik; Kurtis McKenzie; Jon Mills; Alex Ben-Abdallah
- Producers: Benny Blanco; The Arcade; Louie Lastic

Maroon 5 singles chronology
"Feelings" (2015)	"Don't Wanna Know" (2016)	"Cold" (2017)

Kendrick Lamar singles chronology
"Really Doe" (2016)	"Don't Wanna Know" (2016)	"Goosebumps" (2016)

Audio video
- "Don't Wanna Know" on YouTube

"Don't Wanna Know" is a song by American pop rock band Maroon 5 featuring American rapper Kendrick Lamar. The song was released on October 11, 2016, through 222 Records and Interscope Records, as the lead single from the band's sixth studio album Red Pill Blues (2017), included on both the deluxe and Japanese editions of the album. The song reached the top 10 in 23 countries, including number 6 in the United States. Critical reception to the song was mixed, with critics praising its production but criticizing its repetitive chorus and Lamar's verse.

== Composition ==
"Don't Wanna Know" is written in the key of G major in common time with a shuffling tempo of 100 beats per minute. The song follows a chord progression of CMaj7 – D6 – Em7 – Bm/E, and Levine's vocals span from D_{4} to C_{6}.

== Critical reception ==
The song received mixed reviews by music critics. Mike Wass of Idolator stated "there's nothing bloated or excessive about the finished product. In fact, this is a case of less is more. [Don't Wanna Know] freshens up Maroon 5's sound and goes HAM on the repetition (the cornerstone of hitmarking circa 2016) — all but guarantees the band a smash hit in the process. Kendrick's verse feels like an afterthought, but apart from that, this is hard to fault." Vulture's Halle Kiefer said "it'll be on the soundtrack to every car commercial, Target ad, and drunken breakup you flounder through for the next three months" and went on to say "Don't Wanna Know has a distinctly non-Maroon 5 sound, putting a breezy, bouncy, lighthearted spin on drinking to forget, and dancing to dull the pain of losing the one true connection you ever had."

== Commercial performance ==
The song debuted at number 56 on the Billboard Hot 100 on October 29, 2016, and jumped to number 9 in its second week on November 5. It later peaked at number 6, becoming the band's 12th and Lamar's third top ten hit.

== Music video ==
The music video for "Don't Wanna Know" was directed by David Dobkin and does not include Lamar, instead using the song's original version. It was shot starting on August 28, 2016, in Los Angeles, and premiered on The Today Show, on October 14, 2016. The video spoofed the augmented reality game Pokémon Go.

In the video, Adam Levine is dressed as a blue turtle dealing with heartbreak over an orange played by Sarah Silverman, with the Maroon 5 members also dressed the various costumes. In certain scenes, they're being chased and hiding from people who play the game to capture a creature onto the phone and other times eliminate themselves, as well as the set of shooting a music video in the studio complete with film crew, the band performing in a concert and the house party. The video also features cameos from Ed Helms, David Lautman, Amanda Cerny, Shaquille O'Neal and Vince Vaughn.

== Promotion ==
Upon the song being released, it was revealed to be included in the dance rhythm video game Just Dance 2017. In November 2016, Maroon 5 collaborated with Tumblr to launch a promotional campaign known as the Don't Wanna Know Confessional Wall, where encouraging fans to submit of their own darkest secrets, allowing them to write the wall in the most creative way possible. The wall is located at La Brea Avenue in Los Angeles. It is also nominated at the 2017 Shorty Awards for Best Use of Tumblr. In December 2016, another campaign from Musical.ly, where fans to sing a lip sync video and chance to win a signed guitar.

== Live performances ==
On September 3, 2016, Maroon 5 debuted "Don't Wanna Know", on their world tour at San Antonio. The band played the song during their live performances including The Ellen DeGeneres Show on November 3, and The Voice on November 28, 2016. Maroon 5 also performed along with Kendrick Lamar for closing ceremony at the 2016 American Music Awards on November 20, 2016. The band continuing the song live with the 2017 edition of Wango Tango on May 13, 2017.

== Accolades ==
Year	Ceremony	Category	Result	Ref.
2017	American Music Awards	Collaboration of the Year	Nominated	
2017	BMI London Awards	Pop Award	Won	
2017	Circle Chart Music Awards	International Song of the Year	Won	
2017	Melon Music Awards	Best Pop Award	Nominated	
2017	Shorty Awards	Best Use of Tumblr	Nominated	
2017	Teen Choice Awards	Choice Pop Song	Nominated	
2018	ASCAP Pop Music Awards	Award Winning Song	Won	
2018	BMI Pop Awards	Award Winning Song	Won	
2018	iHeartRadio Music Awards	Best Collaboration	Nominated	

== Track listing ==
Digital download – Original

1. "Don't Wanna Know" – 3:34

Digital download – Single

1. "Don't Wanna Know" (featuring Kendrick Lamar) – 3:34

Digital download – Extended

1. "Don't Wanna Know" (featuring Kendrick Lamar) – 4:25

Digital download – Ryan Riback Remix

1. "Don't Wanna Know" (Ryan Riback Remix) (featuring Kendrick Lamar) – 3:50

Digital download – BRAVVO Remix

1. "Don't Wanna Know" (BRAVVO Remix) (featuring Kendrick Lamar) – 3:24

Digital download – Fareoh Remix

1. "Don't Wanna Know" (Fareoh Remix) (featuring Kendrick Lamar) – 3:57

Digital download – Total Ape Remix

1. "Don't Wanna Know" (Total Ape Remix) (featuring Kendrick Lamar) – 3:14

Digital download – Zaeden Remix

1. "Don't Wanna Know" (Zaeden Remix) (featuring Kendrick Lamar) – 3:34

== Personnel ==
=== Maroon 5 ===
- Adam Levine – lead and backing vocals, songwriting
- Jesse Carmichael – guitar
- James Valentine – guitar
- Matt Flynn – drums, percussion
- PJ Morton – keyboards

=== Additional personnel ===
- Kendrick Lamar – rap (featured artist)

== Charts ==
=== Weekly charts ===
Chart (2016–2017)	Peak position
Argentina (Monitor Latino)	7
Australia (ARIA)	6
Australia Urban (ARIA)	2
Austria (Ö3 Austria Top 40)	18
Belgium (Ultratop 50 Flanders)	21
Belgium (Ultratop 50 Wallonia)	7
Canada Hot 100 (Billboard)	6
Canada AC (Billboard)	1
Canada CHR/Top 40 (Billboard)	1
Canada Hot AC (Billboard)	1
CIS Airplay (TopHit)	123
Croatia (HRT)	6
Czech Republic Airplay (ČNS IFPI)	11
Czech Republic Singles Digital (ČNS IFPI)	6
Denmark (Tracklisten)	5
Ecuador (National-Report)	10
Euro Digital Song Sales (Billboard)	6
Finland (Suomen virallinen lista)	16
France (SNEP)	20
Germany (GfK)	33
Hungary (Rádiós Top 40)	2
Hungary (Single Top 40)	9
Ireland (IRMA)	6
Israel (Media Forest)	4
Italy (FIMI)	4
Italian Airplay (EarOne)	6
Lebanon (Lebanese Top 20)	1
Japan Hot 100 (Billboard)	36
Mexico Airplay (Billboard)	7
Netherlands (Dutch Top 40)	11
Netherlands (Single Top 100)	10
New Zealand (Recorded Music NZ)	4
Norway (VG-lista)	14
Paraguay (Monitor Latino)	14
Poland Airplay (ZPAV)	3
Portugal (AFP)	3
Scottish Singles Sales (Official Charts)	3
Slovakia Airplay (ČNS IFPI)	7
Slovakia Singles Digital (ČNS IFPI)	7
South Korea (Gaon)	41
Spain (Promusicae)	15
Sweden (Sverigetopplistan)	15
Switzerland (Schweizer Hitparade)	14
UK Singles (Official Charts)	5
US Billboard Hot 100	6
US Adult Contemporary (Billboard)	1
US Adult Pop Airplay (Billboard)	1
US Dance Club Songs (Billboard)	24
US Dance Airplay (Billboard)	3
US Pop Airplay (Billboard)	1
US Rhythmic Airplay (Billboard)	18

=== Year-end charts ===
Chart (2016)	Position
Australia (ARIA)	78
Australia Urban (ARIA)	8
Hungary (Single Top 40)	91
Italy (FIMI)	83
Netherlands (Dutch Top 40)	82
South Korean International Singles (Gaon)	9
UK Singles (OCC)	86
Chart (2017)	Position
Argentina (Monitor Latino)	39
Belgium (Ultratop Wallonia)	65
Brazil (Pro-Música Brasil)	87
Canada (Canadian Hot 100)	37
Croatia (HRT Top 40)	25
France (SNEP)	142
Hungary (Rádiós Top 40)	12
Hungary (Single Top 40)	83
Hungary (Stream Top 40)	70
Italy (FIMI)	64
Latvia Airplay (LaIPA)	75
Poland (ZPAV)	61
Portugal (AFP)	92
Spain Airplay (PROMUSICAE)	18
Switzerland (Schweizer Hitparade)	77
US Billboard Hot 100	38
US Adult Contemporary (Billboard)	1
US Adult Top 40 (Billboard)	7
US Dance/Mix Show Airplay (Billboard)	27
US Mainstream Top 40 (Billboard)	13

== Certifications ==
Region	Certification	Certified units/sales
Australia (ARIA)	5× Platinum	350,000^{‡}
Belgium (BRMA)	Gold	10,000^{‡}
Brazil (Pro-Música Brasil)	2× Diamond	500,000^{‡}
Canada (Music Canada)	5× Platinum	400,000^{‡}
Denmark (IFPI Danmark)	Platinum	90,000^{‡}
France (SNEP)	Gold	66,666^{‡}
Germany (BVMI)	Gold	200,000^{‡}
Italy (FIMI)	3× Platinum	150,000^{‡}
New Zealand (RMNZ)	3× Platinum	90,000^{‡}
Poland (ZPAV)	2× Platinum	100,000^{‡}
Portugal (AFP)	Gold	5,000^{‡}
Spain (Promusicae)	Platinum	40,000^{‡}
Sweden (GLF)	Gold	20,000^{‡}
United Kingdom (BPI)	Platinum	600,000^{‡}
United States (RIAA)	2× Platinum	2,000,000^{‡}
^{‡} Sales+streaming figures based on certification alone.

== Release history ==
Region	Date	Format	Version	Label(s)	Ref.
Various	October 11, 2016	Digital download; streaming	Original; single	222; Interscope	
Italy	October 14, 2016	Contemporary hit radio	Single	Universal	
United States	October 18, 2016	Contemporary hit radio	Single	222; Interscope	
Various	December 23, 2016	Digital download	Ryan Riback Remix	222; Interscope	
Various	January 6, 2017	Digital download	BRAVVO Remix	222; Interscope	
Various	January 6, 2017	Digital download	Fareoh Remix	222; Interscope	
Various	January 6, 2017	Digital download	Total Ape Remix	222; Interscope	
Various	January 6, 2017	Digital download	Zaeden Remix	222; Interscope	
