= Charlie (Charlie Puth album) =

Studio album by Charlie Puth
- Released: October 7, 2022
- Recorded: 2020–2021
- Genre: Pop
- Length: 32:58
- Label: Atlantic
- Producer: Charlie Puth

Charlie Puth chronology
Voicenotes (2018)	Charlie (2022)	Whatever's Clever! (2026)

Singles from Charlie
- 1. "Light Switch" Released: January 20, 2022; 2. "That's Hilarious" Released: April 8, 2022; 3. "Left and Right" Released: June 24, 2022; 4. "Smells Like Me" Released: September 2, 2022; 5. "I Don't Think That I Like Her" Released: September 16, 2022; 6. "Charlie Be Quiet!" Released: September 30, 2022; 7. "Loser" Released: October 7, 2022

Charlie (stylized in all uppercase) is the third studio album by American singer-songwriter Charlie Puth, released on October 7, 2022, by Atlantic Records. It was Puth's first album in over four years, after Voicenotes (2018).

== Background ==
Since the release of his second studio album Voicenotes (2018), Puth released and was featured on a number of singles between 2019 and 2021. He dropped three standalone singles that were meant for the album in 2019; "I Warned Myself", "Mother", and "Cheating on You". He dropped two more standalone singles in 2020; "Girlfriend", and "Hard on Yourself", the latter featuring Blackbear. He also released "Free" as a single from the 2020 film The One and Only Ivan. Puth featured in "Summer Feelings" with Lennon Stella for the soundtrack for the 2020 film Scoob!, and featured on singles with Jvke, Sasha Alex Sloan, and Elton John. He also appeared on the remix of Gabby Barrett's single "I Hope", which helped the song peak at number three on the Billboard Hot 100, becoming Puth's fourth top ten hit.

After deciding to scrap the original version of his third album in 2020 due to poor performances and reviews of the singles he had released since Voicenotes, Puth took a moment to "recalibrate", and became inspired to tease the makings of the songs he was making, causing him to tease nearly the entire album on TikTok, which made several of the songs go viral on the app. Puth stated that he almost named the album Conversation with Myself due to the isolation caused by the COVID-19 pandemic.

== Promotion ==
=== Tour ===
On September 16, 2022, Puth announced that he would be embarking on the One Night Only Tour in support of Charlie. The tour will visit North America in October and November 2022, with tickets being available for sale on September 23, 2022. On September 26, 2022, Puth announced he would be bringing the tour to Europe with tickets going on sale on September 30, 2022.

=== Singles ===
Charlie was supported by seven singles. Its lead single, "Light Switch", was released on January 20, 2022. It went viral on TikTok months prior to its release. The song peaked at 27 on the Billboard Hot 100, and charted internationally in Canada, Ireland, Lithuania, New Zealand, Singapore, Sweden, Switzerland, United Kingdom, and also charted globally.

"That's Hilarious" was released as the album's second single on April 8, 2022. The song failed to chart in the US, peaking at nine on Bubbling Under Hot 100. However, the song peaked at 80 in Canada, and at 100 in the United Kingdom.

"Left and Right", with BTS member Jung Kook, was released on June 24, 2022, as the third single from the album. The song peaked at 22 in the United States, becoming the album's highest-charting song there, and peaked at 17 in Canada, while also charting in 29 additional countries.

"Smells Like Me" was released as the fourth single on September 2, 2022, followed by the fifth single, "I Don't Think That I Like Her", on September 16, 2022, the sixth single, "Charlie Be Quiet!", on September 30, 2022, and the seventh single, "Loser", on October 7, 2022.

== Critical reception ==
Professional ratings
Aggregate scores
Source	Rating
Metacritic	81/100
Review scores
Source	Rating
AllMusic	4/5 stars
Clash	6/10
The Line of Best Fit	8/10
Rolling Stone	4/5 stars
The Daily Telegraph	4/5 stars

At Metacritic, which assigns a normalized rating out of 100 to reviews from professional publications, Charlie received a weighted average score of 81, indicating "universal acclaim", based on five critical reviews. It is Puth's highest-rated album on the site.

== Commercial performance ==
Charlie debuted at number 10 on the US Billboard 200 chart with 26,500 album equivalent units, 9,500 of which came from pure sales. It earned Puth his third top-ten album in the United States. The album debuted at number 9 on the UK Albums Chart, earning Puth his third top-ten album in the country.

== Track listing ==
All tracks are produced by Charlie Puth.

Charlie track listing
No.	Title	Writer(s)	Length
1.	"That's Hilarious"	Charlie Puth; Jacob Kasher Hindlin	2:24
2.	"Charlie Be Quiet!"	Puth; Hindlin	2:08
3.	"Light Switch"	Puth; Hindlin; Jake Torrey	3:07
4.	"There's a First Time for Everything"	Puth; Hindlin	2:16
5.	"Smells Like Me"	Puth; Hindlin	3:24
6.	"Left and Right" (featuring Jungkook)	Puth; Hindlin	2:34
7.	"Loser"	Puth; Hindlin	3:24
8.	"When You're Sad I'm Sad"	Puth; Hindlin	2:54
9.	"Marks on My Neck"	Puth; Hindlin	2:18
10.	"Tears on My Piano"	Puth; Hindlin; Torrey	3:01
11.	"I Don't Think That I Like Her"	Puth; Hindlin; Torrey; Blake Slatkin	3:08
12.	"No More Drama"	Puth; Hindlin; Torrey	2:20
Total length:			32:58

Charlie – Japanese edition bonus track
No.	Title	Writer(s)	Length
13.	"Light Switch" (acoustic)	Puth; Hindlin; Torrey	3:06
Total length:			36:04

== Personnel ==
Musicians

- Charlie Puth – vocals
- Jan Ozveren – guitar
- David Bukovinszky – cello (track 1)
- Mattias Bylund – string arrangement, string synthesizer (1, 8)
- Mattias Johansson – violin (1, 8)
- Conny Lindgren – violin (1)
- Travis Barker – drums (11)
- Jung Kook – vocals (track 6)

Technical

- Charlie Puth – production, mixing
- Colin Leonard – mastering (1, 3)
- Emerson Mancini – mastering (2, 4–12)
- Manny Marroquin – mixing
- Chris Galland – mix engineering (1, 5, 6)
- Benjamin Sedano – engineering
- Pdogg – engineering (6)
- Mattias Bylund – recording (1)
- Jeremie Inhaber – mixing assistance (1, 6)
- Scott Desmarais – mixing assistance (1, 6)
- Robin Florent – mixing assistance (1, 6)
- Trey Station – mixing assistance (2–4, 7–12)
- Anthony Vilchis – mixing assistance (2–4, 7–12)
- Zach Pereyra – mixing assistance (2–4, 7–12)

== Charts ==
Chart performance for Charlie
Chart (2022)	Peak position
Australian Albums (ARIA)	5
Austrian Albums (Ö3 Austria)	55
Belgian Albums (Ultratop Flanders)	52
Belgian Albums (Ultratop Wallonia)	84
Canadian Albums (Billboard)	7
Dutch Albums (Album Top 100)	21
French Albums (SNEP)	77
German Albums (Offizielle Top 100)	92
Irish Albums (Official Charts)	37
Japanese Albums (Oricon)	32
Japanese Combined Albums (Oricon)	36
Japanese Hot Albums (Billboard Japan)	24
Lithuanian Albums (AGATA)	28
New Zealand Albums (RMNZ)	6
Scottish Albums (Official Charts)	22
Spanish Albums (Promusicae)	30
Swiss Albums (Schweizer Hitparade)	32
UK Albums (Official Charts)	9
US Billboard 200	10

== Certifications ==
Certifications for Charlie
Region	Certification	Certified units/sales
Canada (Music Canada)	Gold	40,000^{‡}
New Zealand (RMNZ)	Gold	7,500^{‡}
^{‡} Sales+streaming figures based on certification alone.
