= Jacob Kasher Hindlin =

American songwriter and record producer

- Also known as: J Kash; JKash
- Born: Jacob Kasher Hindlin; October 1, 1983 (age 43); Virginia Beach, Virginia, US
- Genre: Pop
- Occupations: Songwriter; record producer
- Years active: 2008–present

Jacob Kasher Hindlin (born October 1, 1983), also known as J Kash and JKash, is an American songwriter and record producer. He has written songs for artists such as Charlie Puth, Maroon 5, One Direction, Dua Lipa, Britney Spears, Selena Gomez, Kesha, Ariana Grande, Lady Gaga, Katy Perry, Jason Derulo, Meghan Trainor, Tate McRae, and many others.

He has co-written five Billboard Hot 100 number-one songs: Kesha's "We R Who We R" (2010), Jawsh 685's "Savage Love (Laxed – Siren Beat) (with Jason Derulo)" (2020), and Morgan Wallen's "Last Night" (2023), "Love Somebody" (2024), and "What I Want (featuring Tate McRae)". Additionally, he has written five top 40 radio number-one songs including: Maroon 5's "Sugar" (2015), "Don't Wanna Know (featuring Kendrick Lamar)" (2016), and "Memories" (2019), Charlie Puth's "Attention" (2017), and Jawsh 685's "Savage Love (Laxed – Siren Beat) (with Jason Derulo)" (2020). He has also won 21 ASCAP Songwriting Awards and is the founder of the record label Sandlot Records.

== Music career ==
Hindlin grew up in Virginia Beach, Virginia. After trying to make it as a rapper in Virginia, Hindlin moved to Miami where he quickly befriended producer Kevin Rudolf. He and Rudolf went on to craft Rudolf's entire 2008 debut album In the City. Shortly after the success of In the City, Hindlin moved to Los Angeles, CA.

In 2010, Hindlin signed with publishing company Prescription Songs.

Hindlin executive produced Maroon 5's 6th, 7th, and 8th studio albums: Red Pill Blues (2017), Jordi (2021), and Love Is Like (2025). He has also worked extensively with Meghan Trainor, Katy Perry, and Charlie Puth, helping to craft five songs on Trainor's 2016 album Thank You, eight songs on Perry's 2020 album Smile, 11 of the 13 songs on Puth's 2018 album Voicenotes, and all 12 songs on Puth's 2022 album Charlie.

Hindlin founded an independent record label Sandlot Records in 2020 and has since signed deals with artists such as Addison Rae, Huddy, Daya, Cxloe, Niko Rubio, and Babygirl.

In 2022, Hindlin was named one of Genius' Top 25 Songwriters of 2022.

In 2023, Hindlin co-wrote Morgan Wallen's "Last Night" which spent 16 non-consecutive weeks at the top of the Billboard Hot 100, the most ever for a non-collaboration and tied for the second most of all time. The song also earned Hindlin a nomination for Best Country Song at the 66th Annual Grammy Awards.

In 2024, Hindlin was added as a principal and owner of Livelihood Music Company, an independent music publishing company.

== Discography ==
=== Songwriting credits ===
Year	Artist	Album	Song	Co-written with	Ref(s).
2008	Kevin Rudolf	In The City	"I Song"	Kevin Rudolf, Ivan Corraliza	
2008	Kevin Rudolf	In The City	"Livin' It Up"	Kevin Rudolf, Charles D. Anderson	
2008	Kevin Rudolf	In The City	"N.Y.C." (featuring Nas)	Kevin Rudolf, Nasir Jones, Joshua Berkman	
2008	Kevin Rudolf	In The City	"No Way Out"	Kevin Rudolf	
2008	Kevin Rudolf	In The City	"Scarred"	Kevin Rudolf	
2008	Kevin Rudolf	In The City	"Welcome to the World" (solo or featuring Rick Ross or featuring Kid Cudi)	Kevin Rudolf, William Roberts, Ivan Corraliza	
2008	Kevin Rudolf	In The City	"She Can Get It"	Kevin Rudolf, Chad Hugo	
2008	Kevin Rudolf	In The City	"Great Escape"	Kevin Rudolf, Brian Reid, Cher London	
2009	Cobra Starship	Hot Mess	"Hot Mess"	Kara DioGuardi, Alex Suarez, Bruno Mars, Gabe Saporta, Kevin Rudolf, Mike Caren, Nate Novarro, Oliver Goldstein, Philip Lawrence, Ronnie Wood, Ryland Blackinton, Victoria Asher, Sara Allen	
2009	Cobra Starship	Hot Mess	"Good Girls Go Bad" (featuring Leighton Meester)	Kara DioGuardi, Alex Suarez, Gabe Saporta, Kevin Rudolf, Nate Novarro, Ryland Blackinton, Victoria Asher	
2009	Birdman	Pricele$$	"I Want It All" (featuring Lil Wayne & Kevin Rudolf)	Bryan Williams, Kevin Rudolf, Dwayne Carter	
2009	Leona Lewis	Echo	"Love Letter"	Kevin Rudolf	
2009	Allison Iraheta	Just Like You	"Beat Me Up"	Kevin Rudolf	
2009	Allison Iraheta	Just Like You	"One More Reason"	Kevin Rudolf	
2010	Kevin Rudolf	To The Sky	"I Made It (Cash Money Heroes)" (featuring Birdman, Jay Sean, & Lil Wayne)	Kevin Rudolf, Dwayne Carter, Bryan Williams, Kamaljit Jhooti, Robert Larow, Jerome Skaller	
2010	Kevin Rudolf	To The Sky	"You Make the Rain Fall" (featuring Flo Rida)	Kevin Rudolf, Lukasz Gottwald, Allan Grigg, Tramar Dillard, Jeff Halavacs, Eric Estrada	
2010	Kevin Rudolf	To The Sky	"Don't Cry"	Kevin Rudolf	
2010	Kevin Rudolf	To The Sky	"Whatchu Waitin' For" (featuring Three 6 Mafia)	Kevin Rudolf, Lukasz Gottwald, Paul Beauregard, Jordan Houston	
2010	Kevin Rudolf	To The Sky	"Big Timer"	Kevin Rudolf, Eric Estrada	
2010	Kevin Rudolf	To The Sky	"I Belong to You (LANY)"	Kevin Rudolf, Jeff Halavacs	
2010	Kevin Rudolf	To The Sky	"Must Be Dreamin'" (featuring Rivers Cuomo of Weezer)	Kevin Rudolf, Lukasz Gottwald, Rivers Cuomo	
2010	Kevin Rudolf	To The Sky	"Spit in Your Face" (featuring Lil Wayne)	Kevin Rudolf, Dwayne Carter, Marcello Valenzano, Andre Lyon	
2010	Kevin Rudolf	To The Sky	"What Do U Got"	Kevin Rudolf, Jeff Halavacs	
2010	Kevin Rudolf	To The Sky	"Late Night Automatic" (featuring Three 6 Mafia)	Kevin Rudolf, Lukasz Gottwald, Paul Beauregard, Jordan Houston	
2010	Kevin Rudolf	To The Sky	"Crashing Down"	Kevin Rudolf, Jeff Halavacs	
2010	Flo Rida	Only One Flo (Part 1)	"On and On" (featuring Kevin Rudolf)	Tramar Dillard, Kevin Rudolf, Axel Hedfors, Mike Caren	
2010	Fefe Dobson	Joy	"Ghost"	Fefe Dobson, Kevin Rudolf, Kara DioGuardi	
2010	Lifehouse	Smoke & Mirrors	"Halfway Gone"	Jason Wade, Jude Cole, Kevin Rudolf	
2010	Lifehouse	Smoke & Mirrors	"Falling In"	Jason Wade, Jude Cole, Kevin Rudolf	
2010	Selena Gomez & the Scene	A Year Without Rain	"Round & Round"	Kevin Rudolf, Andrew Bolooki, Fefe Dobson, Jeff Halavacs	
2010	Jesse McCartney	Have It All	"Shake"	Jesse McCartney, Joshua Coleman	
2010	Jesse McCartney	Have It All	"One Night"	Kevin Rudolf, Jesse McCartney	
2010	Jesse McCartney	Have It All	"I Think She Likes Me" (featuring Aimeé Proal)	Kevin Rudolf, Jesse McCartney, Jeff Halavacs	
2010	Kesha	Cannibal	"We R Who We R"	Kesha Sebert, Joshua Coleman, Lukasz Gottwald, Benjamin Levin	
2010	Matisse	Matisse	"Better Than Her" (featuring Akon)	Kevin Rudolf	
2010	Big Time Rush	BTR	"Oh Yeah"	Big Time Rush, Kevin Rudolf	
2010	My Darkest Days	My Darkest Days	"The World Belongs To Me"	Chad Kroeger, Dustin Moore, Jamal Sublett, Joey Moi, Kevin Rudolf, Matt Walst	
2011	Hollywood Undead	American Tragedy	"Coming Back Down"	Danny Murillo, J-Dog, Johnny 3 Tears, Jeff Halavacs, Kevin Rudolf	
2011	Hollywood Undead	American Tragedy	"Levitate"	Charlie Scene, Danny Murillo, J-Dog, Johnny 3 Tears, Kevin Rudolf	
2011	Britney Spears	Femme Fatale	"Inside Out"	Lukasz Gottwald, Mathieu Jomphe, Max Martin, Bonnie McKee	
2011	Cher Lloyd	Sticks and Stones	"Grow Up" (featuring Busta Rhymes)	Cher Lloyd, Kevin Rudolf, Savan Kotecha, Andrew Harr, Jermaine Jackson, Trevor Smith	
2012	Kevin Rudolf	Non-album single	"Champions" (featuring Limp Bizkit, Birdman, & Lil Wayne)	Kevin Rudolf, Bryan Williams, Fred Durst, Dwayne Carter	
2012	Lifehouse	Almería	"Between the Raindrops" (featuring Natasha Bedingfield)	Jason Wade, Jude Cole	
2012	T.I.	Trouble Man: Heavy Is the Head	"Guns and Roses" (featuring P!nk)	Clifford Harris, Jr., Alecia Moore, Tyler Williams, Nikhil Seetharam, Kelly Sheehan	
2012	Miranda Cosgrove	ICarly: iSoundtrack II	"Million Dollars"	Andrew Bolooki, Phil Shaouy, Emily Wright	
2012	Wax Motif	Non-album single	"Never Fall Again" (with Madame Buttons)	Daniel Chien, Kelly Sheehan	
2012	Hinder	Welcome to the Freakshow	"Should Have Known Better"	Cody Hanson, Austin Winkler, Marshal Dutton, Jeff Halavacs	
2013	Avril Lavigne	Avril Lavigne	"17"	Avril Lavigne, Martin Johnson	
2013	Avril Lavigne	Avril Lavigne	"Rock n Roll"	Avril Lavigne, Chad Kroeger, David Hodges, Peter Svensson, Rickard Göransson	
2013	Avril Lavigne	Avril Lavigne	"Here's to Never Growing Up"	Avril Lavigne, Chad Kroeger, David Hodges, Martin Johnson	
2013	Avril Lavigne	Avril Lavigne	"Bitchin' Summer"	Avril Lavigne, Chad Kroeger, David Hodges, Matt Squire	
2013	Avril Lavigne	Avril Lavigne	"Sippin' on Sunshine"	Avril Lavigne, Chad Kroeger, David Hodges, Martin Johnson	
2013	Selena Gomez	Stars Dance	"Birthday"	Crista Russo, Mike Del Rio	
2013	Selena Gomez	Stars Dance	"I Like It That Way"	Joshua Coleman, Rickard Göransson, Fransisca Hall, Alexander Castillo Vasquez	
2013	Juicy J	Stay Trippy	"Bounce It" (featuring Wale & Trey Songz)	Jordan Houston, Olubowale Akintimehin, Lukasz Gottwald, Ethan Lowery, Henry Walter	
2013	Juicy J	Stay Trippy	"Scholarship" (featuring A$AP Rocky)	Gamal Lewis, Jordan Houston, Rakim Mayers, Ricky Witherspoon Jr.	
2013	Britney Spears	The Smurfs 2: Music from and Inspired by	"Ooh La La"	Lukasz Gottwald, Joshua Coleman, Henry Walter, Bonnie Mckee, Lola Blanc, Fransisca Hall	
2013	Christina Grimmie	With Love	"Tell My Mama"	Andrew Bolooki, Gamal Lewis, Evan Bogart	
2013	Emblem3	Nothing to Lose	"Nothing to Lose"	Max Martin, Marco Borrero, Johan Carlsson	
2013	Emblem3	Nothing to Lose	"Do It All Again"	Matt Squire, Johan Carlsson, Jeff Halavacs, Fransisca Hall	
2013	Scott & Rivers	Scott & Rivers	"Freakin' Love My Life"	Rivers Cuomo, Jeff Halavacs, Scott Murphy, Kevin Rudolf	
2013	Timeflies	Warning Signs	"Ride"	Johan Carlsson, Robert Resnick, Caleb Shapiro, Matt Squire	
2014	Maroon 5	V	"Sugar" (solo or featuring Nicki Minaj)	Adam Levine, Joshua Coleman, Lukasz Gottwald, Mike Posner, Henry Walter	
2014	Weezer	Everything Will Be Alright in the End	"Back to the Shack"	Rivers Cuomo	
2014	Jessie J	Sweet Talker	"Burnin' Up" (featuring 2 Chainz)	Jessica Cornish, Andreas Schuller, Eric Frederic, Chloe Angelides, Rickard Göransson, Gamal Lewis, Tauheed Epps	
2014	Nicki Minaj	The Pinkprint	"Get On Your Knees" (featuring Ariana Grande)	Onika Maraj, Katy Perry, Chloe Angelides, Lukasz Gottwald, Sarah Hudson, Henry Walter	
2014	Nicki Minaj	The Pinkprint	"Trini Dem Girls" (featuring LunchMoney Lewis)	Onika Maraj, Jeremy Coleman, Lukasz Gottwald, Gamal Lewis, Theron Thomas, Alexander Vasquez, Henry Walter	
2014	Kylie Minogue	Kiss Me Once	"Into the Blue"	Kelly Sheehan, Mike Del Rio	
2014	Kylie Minogue	Kiss Me Once	"Mr President"	Kelly Sheehan, Kylie Minogue	
2014	Nickelback	No Fixed Address	"What Are You Waiting For?"	Chad Kroeger, Ryan Peake, Gordon Sran	
2014	Nickelback	No Fixed Address	"She Keeps Me Up"	Chad Kroeger, Josh Ramsay	
2014	Nickelback	No Fixed Address	"Got Me Runnin' Round" (featuring Flo Rida)	Chad Kroeger	
2014	Jason Derulo	Talk Dirty	"Wiggle" (featuring Snoop Dogg)	Jason Desrouleaux, Eric Frederic, Sean Douglas, John Ryan, Joe Spargur, Andreas Schuller, Calvin Broadus	
2014	Jason Derulo	Talk Dirty	"Zipper"	Jason Desrouleaux, Henry Walter, Sam Sumser, Chloe Angelides, Lukasz Gottwald	
2014	Jake Miller	Dazed and Confused EP	"Dazed and Confused" (featuring Travie McCoy)	Carlos Battey, Eric Frederic, Jake Miller, Steven Battey, Travie McCoy	
2014	Jake Miller	Dazed and Confused EP	"Lion Heart"	Andreas Schuller, Eric Frederic, Jake Miller	
2014	Zara Larsson	1	"Skippin a Beat"	Rickard Göransson, Tove Lo, Kevin Figueiredo, Teddy Pena	
2014	Usher	Non-album single	"I Don't Mind" (featuring Juicy J)	Usher Raymond IV, Jordan Houston, Lukasz Gottwald, Theron Thomas, Timothy Thomas, Henry Walter	
2014	G.R.L.	G.R.L.	"Show Me What You Got"	Lukasz Gottwald, Max Martin, Henry Walter	
2014	G.R.L.	G.R.L.	"Rewind"	Lukasz Gottwald, Max Martin, Henry Walter, Ammar Malik	
2014	Nick & Knight	Nick & Knight	"Drive My Car"	Jordan Knight, Nick Carter, Nate Campany, Jeff Halavacs	
2015	Charlie Puth	Some Type of Love	"I Won't Tell a Soul"	Charlie Puth	
2015	LunchMoney Lewis	Bills - EP	"Bills"	Gamal Lewis, Eric Frederic, Rickard Göransson	
2015	LunchMoney Lewis	Bills - EP	"Mama"	Gamal Lewis, Eric Frederic, Peter Svensson	
2015	LunchMoney Lewis	Bills - EP	"Love Me Back"	Gamal Lewis, Eric Frederic, Jason Evigan	
2015	LunchMoney Lewis	Bills - EP	"Real Thing"	Gamal Lewis, Eric Frederic, Teddy Geiger, Joe Spagur	
2015	LunchMoney Lewis	Non-album single	"Ain't Too Cool"	Brian Logan Dales, Eric Frederic, Gamal Lewis, Henry Walter, John Christopher Gomez, Lukasz Gottwald	
2015	LunchMoney Lewis	Non-album single	"Whip It!" (featuring Chloe Angelides)	Chloe Angelides, Gamal Lewis, Henry Walter, Leon "Ndugu" Chancler, Lukasz Gottwald, Marc Sibley, Nathan Cunningham, Reggie Andrews	
2015	Fifth Harmony	Reflection	"Bo$$"	Eric Frederic, Joe Spagur, Daniel Kyriakides, Gamal Lewis, Taylor Parks	
2015	Fifth Harmony	Reflection	"Reflection"	Julian Bunetta, Victoria Monét	
2015	One Direction	Made in the A.M.	"Perfect"	Harry Styles, Louis Tomlinson, Julian Bunetta, John Ryan, Jesse Shatkin, Maureen Anne McDonald	
2015	One Direction	Made in the A.M.	"End of the Day"	Louis Tomlinson, Liam Payne, Wayne Hector, John Ryan, Ed Drewett, Julian Bunetta, Gamal Lewis	
2015	One Direction	Made in the A.M.	"Love You Goodbye"	Louis Tomlinson, Julian Bunetta	
2015	Ciara	Jackie	"Give Me Love"	Ciara Harris, Lukasz Gottwald, Gamal Lewis, Theron Thomas, Henry Walter	
2015	Carly Rae Jepsen	Emotion	"I Really Like You"	Carly Rae Jepsen, Peter Svensson	
2015	Flo Rida	My House	"Once in a Lifetime"	Gamal Lewis, Henry Walter, Joshua Coleman, Lukasz Gottwald, Martin Johnsson, Tramar Dillard	
2015	Trey Songz	Trigga Reloaded	"Slow Motion"	Tremaine Neverson, Charlie Puth, Geoff Earley	
2015	Selena Gomez	Revival	"Sober"	Chloe Angelides, Julia Michaels, Mikkel Eriksen, Tor Hermansen	
2015	Rixton	Let the Road	"We All Want the Same Thing"	Benjamin Levin, Ammar Malik, Dan Omelio, Joshua Coleman	
2015	Becky G	Non-album single	"Break a Sweat"	Chloe Angelides, Emily Warren, Gamal Lewis, Henry Walter, Lukasz Gottwald	
2015	Sleeping with Sirens	Madness	"Left Alone"	John Feldmann, Kellin Quinn	
2015	5 Seconds of Summer	Sounds Good Feels Good	"Waste the Night"	Ashton Irwin, Calum Hood, Luke Hemmings, Michael Clifford, John Feldmann	
2015	Prince Royce	Double Vision	"Double Vision" (featuring Tyga)	Jason Evigan, Ross Golan, Ammar Malik, Michael Stevenson	
2015	Thomas Rhett	Tangled Up	"I Feel Good" (featuring LunchMoney Lewis)	Thomas Rhett, Sean Douglas, Teddy Geiger, Gamal Lewis, Charlie Puth, Joe Spargur	
2015	Project 46	Beautiful	"Take Away The Pain" (featuring Ava Koci)	Ava Koci, Dallas Koehlke, Ryan Henderson, Thomas Shaw	
2015	Icona Pop	Emergency EP	"First Time"	Aino Jawo, Caroline Hjelt, Eric Frederic, Teddy Geiger, Gamal Lewis, Bjorn Olovsson	
2016	Jennifer Lopez	Non-album single	"Ain't Your Mama"	Meghan Trainor, Gamal Lewis, Henry Walter, Lukasz Gottwald, Theron Thomas	
2016	Meghan Trainor	Thank You	"Watch Me Do"	Meghan Trainor, Eric Frederic, Gamal Lewis	
2016	Meghan Trainor	Thank You	"Me Too"	Meghan Trainor, Eric Frederic, Jason Desrouleaux, Peter Svensson	
2016	Meghan Trainor	Thank You	"No"	Meghan Trainor, Eric Frederic	
2016	Meghan Trainor	Thank You	"I Love Me" (with LunchMoney Lewis)	Meghan Trainor, Eric Frederic, Gamal Lewis, Thomas Troelsen	
2016	Meghan Trainor	Thank You	"I Won't Let You Down"	Meghan Trainor, Eric Frederic, Gamal Lewis	
2016	Charlie Puth	Nine Track Mind	"We Don't Talk Anymore" (featuring Selena Gomez)	Charlie Puth, Selena Gomez	
2016	Charlie Puth	Nine Track Mind	"Does It Feel"	Charlie Puth, Danny Schofield	
2016	Billy Gilman	The Complete Season 11 Collection (The VoicePerformance)	"Because of Me"	Nick Ruth, Phil Shaouy, Ari Leff	
2016	Bebe Rexha	Non-album single	"No Broken Hearts" (featuring Nicki Minaj)	Bleta Rexha, Onika Maraj, Koko LaRoo, Kgaugelo Nalane	
2016	Conrad Sewell	All I Know	"Who You Lovin"	Jamie Hartman, Will Lobban-Bean, Sean Douglas	
2016	Ariana Grande	Dangerous Woman	"Thinking Bout You"	Mathieu Jomphe, Peter Svensson, Chloe Angelides	
2016	Coleman Hell	Summerland	"Devotion"	Coleman Hell, Phil Shaouy, Robert Benvegnu	
2016	Emblem3	Waking Up	"Taboo Love"	Johan Carlsson, Chad Kroeger, Avril Lavigne	
2016	Belly	Another Day in Paradise	"Angels & Demons" (featuring B-Real)	Ahmad Balshe, Benjamin Diehl, Khaled Khaled, Louis Freese	
2017	Hey Violet	From The Outside	"Guys My Age"	Henry Walter, Illsey Juber, John Ryan, Julian Bunetta, Casey Moreta, Miranda Miller, Nia Lovelis, Rena Lovelis	
2017	Hey Violet	From The Outside	"Hoodie"	Jason Evigan, Julian Bunetta, Ross Golan, Ammar Malik, Dan Omelio	
2017	Hey Violet	From The Outside	"All We Ever Wanted"	Dallas Koehlke, Julian Bunetta, Teddy Geiger, Casey Moreta, Miranda Miller, Nia Lovelis, Rena Lovelis, Ruth-Anne Cunningham	
2017	Maroon 5	Red Pill Blues	"Best 4 U"	Adam Levine, Julian Bunetta, John Ryan, Alexander Izquierdo, Andrew Haas, Ian Franzino	
2017	Maroon 5	Red Pill Blues	"Wait"	Adam Levine, John Ryan, Ammar Malik	
2017	Maroon 5	Red Pill Blues	"Lips on You"	Adam Levine, Charlie Puth, Julia Michaels, Jason Evigan	
2017	Maroon 5	Red Pill Blues	"Bet My Heart"	Adam Levine, John Ryan, Phil Shaouy	
2017	Maroon 5	Red Pill Blues	"Who I Am" (featuring LunchMoney Lewis)	Adam Levine, Eric Frederic, Ammar Malik, Gamal Lewis, Teddy Geiger, John Ryan	
2017	Maroon 5	Red Pill Blues	"Whiskey" (featuring ASAP Rocky)	Adam Levine, Rakim Mayers, John Ryan, Tinashe Sibanda	
2017	Maroon 5	Red Pill Blues	"Closure"	Adam Levine, John Ryan, Ammar Malik, Phil Shaouy	
2017	Maroon 5	Red Pill Blues	"Denim Jacket"	Adam Levine, James Alan Ghaleb, Peter Kelleher, Tom Barnes, Ben Kohn, Oscar Görres	
2017	Maroon 5	Red Pill Blues	"Don't Wanna Know" (featuring Kendrick Lamar)	Adam Levine, Benjamin Levin, John Ryan, Ammar Malik, Kurtis McKenzie, Jon Mills, Alex Ben-Abdallah, Kendrick Duckworth	
2017	Maroon 5	Red Pill Blues	"Cold" (featuring Future)	Adam Levine, John Ryan, Justin Tranter, Phil Shaouy	
2017	Maroon 5	Red Pill Blues	"Plastic Rose"	Adam Levine, James Alan Ghaleb, Oscar Görres	
2017	Bebe Rexha	All Your Fault: Pt. 1	"I Got You"	Bleta Rexha, Ben Berger, Lauren Christy, Ryan McMahon, Ryan Rabin	
2017	Bebe Rexha	All Your Fault: Pt. 2	"The Way I Are (Dance with Somebody)" (featuring Lil Wayne)	Bleta Rexha, Dwayne Carter, Clarence Coffee Jr., Joel Little, Jonas Jeberg, Shannon Rubicam, George Merrill	
2017	The Vamps	Night & Day (Night Edition)	"Paper Hearts"	Connor Ball, Tristan Evans, James McVey, Brad Simpson, Justin Tranter, Phil Shaouy	
2017	Robin Schulz	Uncovered	"Shed a Light" (featuring David Guetta & Cheat Codes)	Robin Schulz, David Guetta, Jason Evigan, Giorgio Tuinfort, Stefan Dabruck, John Ryan, Guido Kramer, Dennis Bierbrodt, Ammar Malik, Jürgen Dohr	
2017	Zara Larsson	So Good	"So Good" (featuring Ty Dolla $ign)	Charlie Puth, Danny Schofield, Tyrone William Griffin Jr., Gamal Lewis	
2017	Zara Larsson	So Good	"Sundown"	Zara Larsson, Brian Garcia, Tor Erik Hermansen, Mikkel Storleer Eriksen, Phil Shaouy, Ammar Malik	
2017	Jason Derulo	Non-album single	"Swalla" (featuring Nicki Minaj & Ty Dolla $ign)	Jason Desrouleaux, Onika Miraj, Tyrone William Griffin Jr., Eric Frederic, Gamal Lewis, Russell Jones, Robert Diggs	
2017	Wyclef Jean	Carnival III: The Fall and Rise of a Refugee	"What Happened to Love" (featuring LunchMoney Lewis & The Knocks)	Wyclef Jean, Madeline Nelson, Benjamin Ruttner, James Patterson, Ross Clark	
2017	PRETTYMUCH	Non-album single	"Would You Mind"	Ilya Salmanzadeh, Savan Kotecha, Peter Svensson	
2017	Trey Songz	Tremaine the Album	"Priceless"	Henry Walter, Jeremy Coleman, Lukasz Gottwald, Ryan Ogren, Theron Thomas, Tremaine Neverson	
2017	Shawn Hook	My Side of Your Story	"Never Let Me Let You Go"	Shawn Hook, Jordan K. Johnson, Stefan Johnson, Marcus Lomax, Ammar Malik	
2017	Galantis	The Aviary	"Hello"	Ross Golan, Ammar Malik, Eric Frederic, Christian Karlsson, Jimmy Koitzsch, Henrik Jonback, Linus Eklöw	
2017	Kristian Galva	Non-album single	"Wrong 4 This"	Benjamin Diehl, Kevin Fisher, Khaled Khaled, Kristian Galva, Ryan Ogren	
2018	Jason Mraz	Know.	"Have It All"	Jason Mraz, David Hodges, Mona Tavakoli, Chaska lela Potter, Mai Sunshine Bloomfield, Rebecca Emily Gebhardt	
2018	Meghan Trainor	Non-album single	"Can't Dance"	Meghan Trainor, Andrew Wells	
2018	Meghan Trainor	Non-album single	"Let You Be Right"	Meghan Trainor, Andrew Wells	
2018	Charlie Puth	Voicenotes	"The Way I Am"	Charlie Puth	
2018	Charlie Puth	Voicenotes	"Attention"	Charlie Puth	
2018	Charlie Puth	Voicenotes	"LA Girls"	Charlie Puth, Jason Evigan, Sean Douglas	
2018	Charlie Puth	Voicenotes	"How Long"	Charlie Puth, Justin Franks	
2018	Charlie Puth	Voicenotes	"Done for Me" (featuring Kehlani)	Charlie Puth, Kehlani Parrish, John Ryan	
2018	Charlie Puth	Voicenotes	"Patient"	Charlie Puth, Benjamin Johnson, Fraser Churchill	
2018	Charlie Puth	Voicenotes	"Boy"	Charlie Puth	
2018	Charlie Puth	Voicenotes	"Slow It Down"	Charlie Puth, Rami Yacoub, Carl Falk, Daryl Hall, John Oates, Sara Allen	
2018	Charlie Puth	Voicenotes	"Somebody Told Me"	Charlie Puth, Johan Carlsson	
2018	Charlie Puth	Voicenotes	"Empty Cups"	Charlie Puth, Savan Kotecha, Rickard Goransson, James Alan Ghaleb	
2018	Charlie Puth	Voicenotes	"Through It All"	Charlie Puth, Breyan Isaac	
2018	OneRepublic	Non-album single	"Connection"	Brent Kutzle, Kevin Fisher, Noel Zancanella, Ryan Tedder, Zach Skelton	
2018	Poo Bear	Poo Bear Presents Bearthday Music	"Either" (featuring Zara Larsson)	Mathieu Jomphe, Saul Alexander Castillo Vasquez, Jason "Poo Bear" Boyd	
2018	Poo Bear	Poo Bear Presents Bearthday Music	"That Shit Go" (featuring Ty Dolla $ign)	Khaled Khaled, Ben Diehl, Jason "Poo Bear" Boyd	
2018	Poo Bear	Poo Bear Presents Bearthday Music	"Vegas" (featuring LAZR)	Dominic Jordan, Jason "Poo Bear" Boyd, Jimmy Giannos, Steven Tolson	
2018	Kim Petras	Non-album single	"Heart to Break"	Kim Petras, Aaron Joseph, Henry Walter, Lukasz Gottwald	
2018	Kane Brown	Experiment	"Like a Rodeo"	Kane Brown, Jordan Schmidt, Derrick Southerland	
2018	The Vamps	Night & Day (Day Edition)	"Pictures of Us"	Alexandra Hughes, Jakob Hazell, Svante Halldin, Ammar Malik, Phil Shaouy	
2018	Urban Cone	10-18	"Old School"	Carl Lehmann, Emil Gustafsson, Jacob William Sjöberg, Rasmus Flyckt, Tim Formgren	
2018	Benny Blanco	Friends Keep Secrets	"Better to Lie" (with Jesse & Swae Lee)	Benjamin Levin, Magnus August Høiberg, Nathan Perez, Ammar Malik, Jesse Rutherford, John Ryan, Kahlif Brown	
2018	Chromeo	Head Over Heels	"Must've Been" (featuring DRAM)	Patrick Gemayel, David Macklovitch, Jason Evigan, Gamal Lewis, Isaiah Tejada, Ammar Malik, Shelley Massenburg-Smith, William Bastian	
2018	5 Seconds of Summer	Youngblood	"Want You Back"	Calum Hood, Luke Hemmings, Ashton Irwin, Andrew Goldstein, Asia Whiteacre, Steve McCutcheon	
2018	Vice	Non-album single	"Make Up" (with Jason Derulo, featuring Ava Max)	Ian Kirkpatrick, Ashley Gorley, Charlie Puth, Jason Desrouleaux	
2019	Meghan Trainor	The Love Train	"All the Ways"	Meghan Trainor, Andrew Wells	
2019	Meghan Trainor	The Love Train	"Foolish"	Meghan Trainor, Andrew Wells, Gamal Lewis	
2019	Meghan Trainor	Playmobil: The Movie (Original Motion Picture Soundtrack)	"Run Like the River"	Meghan Trainor, Andrew Wells	
2019	Charlie Puth	Non-album single	"Cheating on You"	Charlie Puth	
2019	Liam Payne	LP1	"Bedroom Floor"	Charlie Puth, Steve McCutcheon, Ammar Malik, Noel Zancanella, Aaron Jennings	
2019	X Ambassadors	Orion	"Hold You Down"	Adam Levin, Casey Harris, Eric Frederic, Malay Ho, Sam Harris	
2019	Daya	Non-album single	"Insomnia"	Grace Tandon, Michael Pollack, Oscar Görres	
2019	Thomas Rhett	Center Point Road	"Look What God Gave Her	Thomas Rhett, Rhett Atkins, Julian Bunetta, John Ryan, Ammar Malik	
2019	Alesso	Non-album single	"Sad Song" (featuring TINI)	Alessandro Lindblad, Asia Whiteacre, Nate Cyphert	
2019	Gallant	Sweet Insomnia	"Hurt"	Chloe Angelides, Matthew Burns, Ali Tamposi, Andrew Wotman	
2019	The Driver Era	X	"Preacher Man"	Julian Bunetta, Ed Drewett, Gamal Lewis, John Ryan	
2019	Sam Martin	Alpha Omega	"Bring Me Home"	Sam Martin, Will Lobban-Bean	
2019	Stephen Puth	Non-album single	"Look Away"	Stephen Puth, Charlie Puth	
2019	Stephen Puth	Non-album single	"Crying My Eyes Out"	Julian Bunetta, Charlie Puth, Jake Torrey, Stephen Puth	
2019	Why Don't We	Non-album single	"Come to Brazil"	Alex Schwartz, Daniel Seavey, Jace Logan Jennings, Jackson Southorn, Joe Khajadourian, Jonah Marais, Lil Aaron, Mike Skwark	
2020	Lil Wayne	Funeral	"Trust Nobody" (featuring Adam Levine)	Dwayne Carter, Ryan Ogren, Brandon Hamlin, Ben Diehl, Jake Torrey, Michael Matosic	
2020	Meghan Trainor	Treat Myself	"No Excuses"	Meghan Trainor, Andrew Wells	
2020	Charlie Puth	Non-album single	"Hard On Yourself" (with blackbear)	Charlie Puth, Matthew Musto	
2020	Charlie Puth	Non-album single	"Girlfriend"	Charlie Puth	
2020	Katy Perry	Smile	"Teary Eyes"	Katy Perry, Michael Pollack, Madison Love, Andrew Goldstein	
2020	Katy Perry	Smile	"Daisies"	Katy Perry, Jonathan Bellion, Michael Pollack, Jordan K. Johnson, Stefan Johnson	
2020	Katy Perry	Smile	"Not the End of the World"	Katy Perry, Michael Pollack, Madison Love, Andrew Goldstein	
2020	Katy Perry	Smile	"Champagne Problems"	Katy Perry, John Ryan, Johan Carlsson, Ian Kirkpatrick	
2020	Katy Perry	Smile	"Tucked"	Katy Perry, Ferra Alqaisi, John Ryan, Johan Carlsson	
2020	Katy Perry	Smile	"Harleys in Hawaii"	Katy Perry, Charlie Puth, Johan Carlsson	
2020	Katy Perry	Smile	"What Makes a Woman"	Katy Perry, Sarah Hudson, John Ryan, Johan Carlsson	
2020	Katy Perry	Smile	"Small Talk"	Katy Perry, Charlie Puth, Johan Carlsson	
2020	Katy Perry	Smile	"Never Worn White"	Katy Perry, John Ryan, Johan Carlsson	
2020	Selena Gomez	Rare	"Feel Me"	Selena Gomez, Ammar Malik, Ross Golan, Phil Shaouy, Lisa Scinta, Kurtis McKenzie, Jon Mills	
2020	Jawsh 685	Non-album single	"Savage Love (Laxed - Siren Beat)" (with Jason Derulo)	Jason Desrouleaux, Joshua Nanai, Phil Greiss	
2020	Jawsh 685	Non-album single	"Sweet & Sour" (featuring Lauv & Tyga)	Gregory Tepa, Jordan Suecof, Joshua Nanai, Michael Ray Stevenson, Natalie Salomon	
2020	Lauv	~how i'm feeling~	"Tattoos Together"	Ari Leff, Michael Pollack, Ammar Malik	
2020	Lauv	Non-album single	"Fake" (with Conan Gray)	Ari Leff, Conan Gray, Jonathan Simpson	
2020	Lauv	Non-album single	"2021"	Ari Leff	
2020	Lady Gaga	Chromatica	"Plastic Doll"	Lady Gaga, BloodPop, Skrillex, Rami Yacoub	
2020	Lady Gaga	Chromatica	"Enigma"	Lady Gaga, BloodPop, Matthew Burns	
2020	Raye	Non-album single	"All Of My Love" (with Young Adz)	Rachel Keen, John DeBold, Westen Weiss, Young Adz	
2020	Evvie McKinney	This Is Evvie McKinney	"Bring The Whole Hood"	Meghan Trainor, Andrew Wells, Evvie McKinney	
2020	Malia Civetz	The Flip	"Broke Boy"	Ross Golan, Jonathan Rotem, Malia Civetz, Nate Cyphert	
2020	Malia Civetz	The Flip	"Disrespectful"	Ross Golan, Alessandro Lindblad, Donna Weiss, Jackie DeShannon, Malia Civetz	
2020	Malia Civetz	The Flip	"Love Thing" (featuring Yung Baby Tate)	Malia Civetz, Nathan Fertig, Ross Golan, Tate Sequoia Farris	
2020	Malia Civetz	Non-album single	"Heart Broke"	Ross Golan, Jeff Halavacs, Malia Civetz, Phil Shaouy	
2020	Ava Max	Heaven & Hell	"Tattoo"	Amanda Ava Koci, Andreas Haukeland, Elof Loelv, Henry Walter, Charlie Puth	
2020	Ava Max	Non-album single	"Kings & Queens, Pt. 2" (featuring Lauv & Saweetie)	Amanda Ava Koci, Brett McLaughlin, Madison Love, Henry Walter, Nadir Khayat, Desmond Child, Mimoza Blinsson, Hillary Bernstein, Jakke Erixon, Ari Leff, Derrick Milano, Diamonte Harper	
2020	Cheat Codes	Hellraisers, Pt. 1	"Between Our Hearts" (featuring Cxloe)	John Ryan, Ammar Malik, T Collar, Tinashe Sibanda, Trevor Dahl, Zara Larsson	
2020	Jack Gilinsky	Non-album single	"My Love" (with Don Toliver)	John Ryan, Caleb Toliver, Jack Gilinsky, Jonathan Rotem, Sherwyn Nicholls	
2020	Jack Gilinsky	Non-album single	"Lose Somebody" (with iann dior)	Rosina Russell, Jack Gilinsky, John Mitchell, Michael Olmo, Philip Kembo, Tinashe Sibanda	
2020	Dua Lipa	Future Nostalgia: The Moonlight Edition	"Fever" (featuring Angèle)	Angèle, Caroline Ailin, Dua Lipa, Ian Kirkpatrick, Julia Michaels	
2020	Faouzia	Non-album single	"Minefields" (with John Legend)	Ali Tamposi, Charlie Puth, Faouzia Ouihya, Jeff Halavacs, Johnny Goldstein, Sam Martin	
2020	Jason Derulo	Non-album single	"Love Not War (The Tampa Beat)" (with Nuka)	Jason Desrouleaux, Ridge Manuka Maukava, Shawn Charles	
2020	Ant Clemons	Non-album single	"Better Days" (featuring Justin Timberlake)	Anthony Clemons Jr., Justin Timberlake, Kenyon Dixon	
2021	Tate McRae	Too Young to Be Sad	"Rubberband"	Andrew Goldstein, Natalie Salomon, Tate McRae, Victoria Zaro	
2021	Huddy	Teenage Heartbreak	"America's Sweetheart	Andrew Goldstein, Nick Long, phem, Chase Hudson, Jake Torrey, Jeff Halavacs	
2021	Huddy	Teenage Heartbreak	"Partycrasher"	Andrew Goldstein, Nick Long, Chase Hudson, Jake Torrey, Travis Barker	
2021	Huddy	Teenage Heartbreak	"Don't Freak Out" (featuring iann dior, Tyson Ritter, & Travis Barker)	Ari Leff, Dallas Koehlke, Nick Long, Jake Torrey, Nick Wheeler, Travis Barker, Tyson Ritter, iann dior	
2021	Huddy	Teenage Heartbreak	"Lost Without You"	Andrew Goldstein, Nick Long, Chase Hudson, Jake Torrey, Travis Barker	
2021	Huddy	Teenage Heartbreak	"The Eulogy of You and Me"	Andrew Goldstein, Nick Long, Chase Hudson, Jake Torrey, Travis Barker	
2021	Huddy	Teenage Heartbreak	"21st Century Vampire"	Nick Long, Andy Seltzer, Chase Hudson, Jake Torrey	
2021	Huddy	Teenage Heartbreak	"How It Ends"	Andrew Goldstein, Nick Long, Ammar Malik, Andy Seltzer, Chase Hudson, Dave Lubben, Jake Torrey, Travis Barker	
2021	Jason Derulo	Non-album single	"Lifestyle" (featuring Adam Levine)	Amy Allen, Pablo Bowman, Adam Levine, Casey Smith, Jason Desrouleaux, Kevin White, Michael Woods, Natalie Salomon	
2021	Sophia Messa	Ice Cream & Cigarettes	"Not That Kind of Love"	Ali Tamposi, Ian Kirkpatrick	
2021	Malia Civetz	Heels In Hand	"Partied Out"	Ross Golan, Jeff Halavacs, Malia Civetz, Nathan Fertig	
2021	Cautious Clay	Deadpan Love	"Wildfire"	Joshua Karpeh, Jake Torrey, Steven Kaplan	
2021	Daya	The Difference	"Bad Girl"	Andrew Goldstein, Michael Pollack, Charlie Puth, Grace Tandon, Madison Love	
2021	Daya	The Difference	"The Difference"	Andrew Goldstein, Grace Tandon, Sophie Cates	
2021	Maroon 5	Jordi	"Beautiful Mistakes" (featuring Megan Thee Stallion)	Andrew Goldstein, Adam Levine, Joe Kirkland, Matthew Musto, Megan Pete	
2021	Maroon 5	Jordi	"Lost"	Alexander Izquierdo, Ali Tamposi, Jonathan Bellion, Michael Pollack, Adam Levine, Jordan K. Johnson, Stefan Johnson	
2021	Maroon 5	Jordi	"Lovesick"	Andrew Goldstein, Gabe Simon, Adam Levine, Mikky Ekko	
2021	Maroon 5	Jordi	"Memories" (solo or featuring Nipsey Hussle & YG)	Adam Levine, Michael Pollack, Jonathan Bellion, Jordan K. Johnson, Stefan Johnson, Vincent Ford	
2021	Maroon 5	Jordi	"One Light" (featuring Bantu)	Ant Clemons, Adam Levine, Cameron Breithaupt, Henry Walter, Kirsten Urbas, Miles Breithaupt, Philip Kembo, Tinashe Sibanda	
2021	Maroon 5	Jordi	"Convince Me Otherwise" (with H.E.R.)	Adam Levine, Gabriella Wilson, Henry Walter, Jerry Edouard, Lennon Kloser	
2021	Maroon 5	Jordi	"Nobody's Love"	Nija Charles, Rosina Russell, Adam Levine, B Ham, Michael Pollack, Jordan K. Johnson, Kareen Lomax, Ryan Ogren, Stefan Johnson	
2021	Maroon 5	Jordi	"Can't Leave You Alone" (featuring Juice WRLD)	Andrew Wotman, Louis Bell, Adam Levine, Jarad Higgins	
2021	Maroon 5	Jordi	"Button" (featuring Anuel AA & Tainy)	Marco Masis, Michael Pollack, Adam Levine, Alejandro Borrero, Emmanuel Gazmey Santiago, Ivanni Rodriguez, Johnny Simpson, Jonathan Bellion, Ricardo Lopez	
2021	Christian French	Non-album single	"avalanche"	Andy Seltzer, Charles Robert Nelsen, Christian French, Jake Torrey, Kyle Buckley	
2021	Blackbear	Misery Lake	"IMU" (featuring Travis Barker)	Andrew Goldstein, Matthew Musto, Travis Barker	
2021	Blackbear	Misery Lake	"Bad Day"	Andrew Goldstein, Charlie Puth, Matthew Musto	
2021	Jake Bugg	Saturday Night, Sunday Morning	"Scene"	Ali Tamposi, Andrew Wotman, Jake Bugg	
2021	Elton John	The Lockdown Sessions	"After All" (featuring Charlie Puth)	Elton John, Charlie Puth	
2021	G-Eazy	These Things Happen Too	"Faithful" (featuring Marc E. Bassy)	Gerald Gillum, Jake Torrey, Marc Griffin, Nick Sarazen	
2021	Kygo	Non-album single	"Undeniable" (featuring X Ambassadors)	Nick Long, Ethan Snoreck, Kyrre Gorvell-Dahll, Patrick Martin	
2021	Darren Criss	Masquerade	"for a night like this"	Jon Hume, Michael Matosic, Christopher J Baran, Darren Criss, Jakob Hazell, Svante Halldin	
2022	The Chainsmokers	So Far So Good	"High"	Alex Pall, Andrew Taggart, Ethan Snorek, Jeff Halavacs, Natalie Salomon, Nick Long	
2022	Sueco	It Was Fun While It Lasted	"It's Going Good!"	Andrew Goldstein, Nick Long, William Henry Schultz	
2022	Sueco	It Was Fun While It Lasted	"Drunk Dial"	Andrew Goldstein, Amanda Ibanez, Colin Brittain, Russ Chell, Victoria Zaro, William Henry Schultz	
2022	Why Don't We	Non-album single	"Just Friends"	Corbyn Besson, Jonah Marais, Amanda Ibanez, Jakob Hazell, Svante Halldin	
2022	Tate McRae	I Used to Think I Could Fly	"Feel Like Shit"	Russell Chell, Tate McRae, Victoria Zaro	
2022	Reneé Rapp	Non-album single	"Tattoos"	Andrew Goldstein, Anton Göransson, Isabella Sjöstrand, Michael Pollack, Reneé Rapp	
2022	James Bay	Leap	"Nowhere Left To Go"	Michael Pollack, James Bay	
2022	James Bay	Leap	"Save Your Love"	Finneas O'Connell, John Ryan, Ammar Malik, James Bay	
2022	Zedd	Non-album single	"Make You Say" (featuring Maren Morris & Beauz)	Anton Zaslavski, Bernie Yang, Johan Yang, Charlie Puth, Maren Morris	
2022	Charlie Puth	Charlie	"That's Hilarious"	Charlie Puth	
2022	Charlie Puth	Charlie	"Charlie Be Quiet!"	Charlie Puth	
2022	Charlie Puth	Charlie	"Light Switch"	Charlie Puth, Jake Torrey	
2022	Charlie Puth	Charlie	"There's A First Time For Everything"	Charlie Puth	
2022	Charlie Puth	Charlie	"Smells Like Me"	Charlie Puth	
2022	Charlie Puth	Charlie	"Left and Right" (featuring Jungkook)	Charlie Puth	
2022	Charlie Puth	Charlie	"Loser"	Charlie Puth	
2022	Charlie Puth	Charlie	"When You're Sad I'm Sad"	Charlie Puth	
2022	Charlie Puth	Charlie	"Marks On My Neck"	Charlie Puth	
2022	Charlie Puth	Charlie	"Tears On My Piano"	Charlie Puth, Jake Torrey	
2022	Charlie Puth	Charlie	"I Don't Think That I Like Her"	Charlie Puth, Blake Slatkin, Jake Torrey	
2022	Charlie Puth	Charlie	"No More Drama"	Charlie Puth, Jake Torrey	
2022	Whethan	Non-album single	"Fall Out Girl" (featuring Zai1k)	Ethan Snoreck, Zai1k, Natalie Salomon, Amanda Ibanez	
2022	Lauv	All 4 Nothing	"Time After Time"	David Biral, Denzel Baptiste, Ian Kirkpatrick, John Cunningham, Madison Love	
2022	Fletcher	Girl Of My Dreams	"Conversations"	Cari Fletcher, Michael Pollack, Madison Love, Marshmello, Daniel Couture	
2022	Hailey Knox	Non-album single	"Waiting on You"	Angelo Alexander Angelides, Hailey Knox	
2022	The Rudeboyz	Non-album single	"Ojalá" (with Maluma & Adam Levine)	Adam Levine, Andres Rios, Andres Marin, Bryan Lezcano, Gerald Jimenez, Jake Torrey, Juan Luis Arias, Kevin Jimenez	
2023	Morgan Wallen	One Thing at a Time	"Last Night"	Ashley Gorley, John Byron, Ryan Vojtesak	
2023	Naliya	Non-album single	"Cupid" (featuring Kiddo A.I.)	Amanda Ibanez, Natalie Salomon	
2023	Thirty Seconds to Mars	Non-album single	"Stuck"	Ammar Malik, John Ryan, Jared Leto	
2023	Celine Dion	Love Again (Soundtrack from the Motion Picture)	"I'll Be"	Ian Kirkpatrick, John Ryan, Ross Golan	
2023	Niall Horan	The Show	"On A Night Like Tonight"	John Ryan, Niall Horan	
2023	Kim Petras	Feed the Beast	"Minute"	Ali Tamposi, Isaiah Tejada, Michael Pollack, Jordan K. Johnson, Stefan Johnson, Kim Petras, Sarah Faith-Griffiths	
2023	Gwen Stefani	Non-album single	"True Babe"	Gwen Stefani, Jakob Hazell, Svante Halldin, Luka Kloser, Nicole Rubio	
2023	Mimi Webb	Non-album single	"This Moment (from Ruby Gillman, Teenage Kraken)"	Amanda Ibanez, Ari Leff, Dallas Koehlke	
2023	Addison Rae	AR (EP)	"2 Die 4" (featuring Charli XCX)	Addison Rae, Madison Love, Brett McLaughlin, Andrew Goldstein, Charli XCX	
2023	Addison Rae	AR (EP)	"Nothing On (But The Radio)"	Addison Rae, Billy Steinberg, Josh Alexander, Madison Love	
2023	Charlie Puth	Non-album single	"Lipstick"	Andrew Wansel, Charlie Puth, Nathan Perez	
2023	Iann Dior	Non-album single	"You Don't Even"	Federico Vindver, Michael Pollack, Jacob Torrey, Michael Olmo	
2023	Iann Dior	Non-album single	"Low Tide"	David Alexander, Elon Loelv, Kii Kinsella, Michael Olmo	
2023	Leah Kate	Super Over	"Bored"	Andrew Goldstein, Leah Kate, Luka Kloser, Madison Love	
2023	Paloma Faith	Non-album single	"How You Leave A Man"	Andrew Wells, Charlie Puth, Elle King	
2023	Selena Gomez	Non-album single	"Single Soon"	Ammar Malik, Ross Golan, Benjamin Levin, Lisa Scinta, Magnus August Hoiberg, Phil Shaouy, Selena Gomez	
2023	X Ambassadors	Aquaman and the Lost Kingdom (Original Motion Picture Soundtrack)	"Deep End"	Adam Levin, Casey Harris, Sam Nelson Harris, Tyler Spry	
2023	Sexyy Red	Hood Hottest Princess	"I Might" (featuring Summer Walker)	Benjamin Dyer Diehl, Janae Wherry, Amanda Ibanez, Nija Charles, Phil Phever, Sam Roman	
2024	X Ambassadors	Non-album single	"No Strings"	Adam Levin, Casey Harris, Ricky Reed, Russ Flynn, Sam Nelson Harris, Toby Tubby	
2024	Zara Larsson	Venus	"More Than This Was"	Amanda Ibanez, Jakob Hazel, Svante Halldin, Zara Larsson	
2024	Paloma Faith	The Glorification of Sadness	"How You Leave A Man"	Andrew Wells, Charlie Puth, Elle King	
2024	BabyMonster	BabyMons7er	"Like That"	Charlie Puth	
2024	Leigh-Anne	No Hard Feelings	"Forbidden Fruit"	Alberto Carlos Melendez, Leigh-Anne Pinnock, Nija Charles	
2024	Meghan Trainor	Timeless	"To The Moon"	Federico Vindver, Meghan Trainor	
2024	Meghan Trainor	Timeless	"I Wanna Thank Me" (featuring Niecy Nash)	Carol Nash, Federico Vindver, Meghan Trainor	
2024	Meghan Trainor	Timeless	"I Get It"	Federico Vindver, Meghan Trainor	
2024	Meghan Trainor	Timeless	"Rollin"	Federico Vindver, Meghan Trainor	
2024	Stray Kids	Non-album single	"Lose My Breath" (featuring Charlie Puth)	Bang Chan, Changbin, Han, Charlie Puth, Johnny Goldstein, Natalie Salomon	
2024	Warren Zeiders	Non-album single	"Betrayal"	Ali Tamposi, Blake Pendergrass, Justin Ebach, Warren Zeiders	
2024	Megan Moroney	Am I Okay?	"I Know You"	Ben Williams, David Mescon, Megan Moroney	
2024	Sueco	Attempted Lover	"Somebody Else"	Andrew Goldstein, Canton Grigsby, Colin Brittain, David Wilson, Jake Torrey, William Schultz	
2024	Jimin	Muse	"Be Mine"	Ali Tamposi, Evan, Ghstloop, Jimin, Pdogg, Ryan Tedder	
2024	Honestav	Non-album single	"Paranoia"	Jake Torrey, Avrey Freeman, Cameron Breithaupt, Paul Meany	
2024	Muni Long	Revenge	"Type Questions"	Jeff Gitelman, Kevin Theodore, Priscilla Renea	
2024	Dasha	What Happens Now?	"Way Too Drunk"	Anna Dasha Novotny, Bardo William Novotny	
2024	Dasha	What Happens Now?	"Leaving Don't Mean Goodbye"	Anna Dasha Novotny, Bardo William Novotny	
2024	Jason Derulo	Nu King	"So Many Hearts"	Jason Desrouleaux, Jonny Goldstein, Sam Martin	
2024	Jason Derulo	Non-album single	"Make Me Happy" (with Jawsh 685)	Amanda Ibanez, Elof Loelv, Jason Desrouleaux, Joshua Nanai, Rory Noble	
2024	Akon	Non-album single	"Akon's Beautiful Day"	Aliaune Thiam, Jermaine Edwards, Philip Phever	
2024	Jas Von	Non-album single	"Dress"	Ali Tamposi, David Mescon, Jasmine Tamposi, Julian Bunetta, Ryan Anderson	
2024	Jennifer Hudson	The Gift Of Love	"Make It To Christmas"	Federico Vindver, Michael Pollack, Jennifer Hudson	
2024	Jennifer Hudson	The Gift Of Love	"Santa For Someone"	Federico Vindver, Michael Pollack, Jennifer Hudson	
2024	Gwen Stefani	Bouquet	"Somebody Else's"	Jake Torrey, Fred Ball, Gwen Stefani, Henry Walter, Madison Love, Nick Long	
2024	Gwen Stefani	Bouquet	"Swallow My Tears"	Gwen Stefani, Henry Walter, Madison Love, Nick Long	
2024	Charlie Puth	Non-album single	"Hero"	Charlie Puth, Jack Rochon, John Byron	
2024	Charlie Puth	Non-album single	"December 25th"	Charlie Puth	
2025	Ashley Cooke	Non-album single	"All I Forgot" (featuring Joe Jonas)	Ashley Cooke, Charlie Puth, David Alexander, Griff Clawson, Joe Jonas, Natalie Salomon	
2025	Alessia Cara	Love & Hyperbole	"Nighttime Thing"	Aaron Shadow, Jasper Harris, Alessia Cara, David Sprecher, Joshua Coleman	
2025	Kidd G	Non-album single	"F-150"	Nick Long, Jonathan Gabriel Horne, Henry Walter	
2025	Warren Zeiders	Relapse, Lies, & Betrayal	"Betrayal"	Ali Tamposi, Blake Pendergrass, Justin Ebach, Warren Zeiders	
2025	Warren Zeiders	Relapse, Lies, & Betrayal	"Love In Letting Go" (with Lanie Gardner)	Ali Tamposi, Blake Pendergrass, Nick Long, Griff Clawson, Warren Zeiders	
2025	Warren Zeiders	Relapse, Lies, & Betrayal	"Bad"	Ali Tamposi, Blake Pendergrass, Nick Long, Griff Clawson, Warren Zeiders	
2025	Warren Zeiders	Relapse, Lies, & Betrayal	"Crying Whiskey"	Ali Tamposi, Blake Pendergrass, Nick Long, Griff Clawson, Warren Zeiders, John Byron	
2025	Morgan Wallen	I'm the Problem	"What I Want" (featuring Tate McRae)	John Byron, Morgan Wallen, Joe Reeves, Ryan Vojtesak, Tate McRae	
2025	Morgan Wallen	I'm the Problem	"Love Somebody"	Ashley Gorley, Elof Loelv, John Byron, Martina Sorbera, Morgan Wallen, Nicholas Gale, Ryan Vojtesak, Shaun Frank, Steven Mastroianni, Yaakov Gruzman	
2025	Morgan Wallen	I'm the Problem	"Just in Case"	Blake Pendergrass, John Byron, Morgan Wallen, Alex Bak, Ernest Keith Smith, Josh Thompson, Ryan Vojtesak	
2025	Maddox Batson	First Dance	"Problem"	Dan Henig, Jake Torrey, Johnny Simpson, Maddox Batson, Sean Cook	
2025	Honestav	hara-kiri	"Livin' Wrong"	Avrey Freeman, Cameron Breithaupt	
2025	Katseye	Beautiful Chaos	"Gnarly" (solo or with Ice Spice)	Alice Longyu Gao, Kyle Buckley, Tim Randolph, Madison Love	
2025	Katseye	Beautiful Chaos	"Gameboy"	Graham Andrew Muron, Celine Polenghi, Jackson Lee Morgan	
2025	Jason Derulo	Non-album single	"You DJ, I'll Drive"	Madison Love, Jake Torrey, Amanda Ibanez, Jason Desrouleaux, Shawn Charles, Tim Suby, Zhone	
2025	Jas Von	Non-album single	"Ain't That What You Do"	Ali Tamposi, Steph Jones, David Mescon, Jasmine Tamposi	
2025	Jas Von	Non-album single	"Looking For Us" (with Kidd G)	David Mescon, Jonathan Gabriel Horne, Jasmine Tamposi, Julian Bunetta	
2025	Jas Von	Non-album single	"Drunk Drinkin'"	David Alexander, Griff Clawson, Jasmine Tamposi, Savannah Sgro	
2025	Thomas Rhett	About A Woman (& a Good Ol' Boy)	"Beautiful As You"	Alexander Izquierdo, John Ryan, Joshua Coleman, Julian Bunetta, Thomas Rhett, Zaire Kelsey	
2025	Thomas Rhett	About A Woman (& a Good Ol' Boy)	"Gone Country"	Thomas Rhett, Joe Reeves, John Byron, Julian Bunetta, Rocky Block, Ryan Vojtesak	
2025	Thomas Rhett	About A Woman (& a Good Ol' Boy)	"Overdrive"	Thomas Rhett, John Ryan, Julian Bunetta	
2025	Thomas Rhett	About A Woman (& a Good Ol' Boy)	"After All the Bars Are Closed"	John Byron, Thomas Rhett, Jaxson Free, Julian Bunetta	
2025	Thomas Rhett	About A Woman (& a Good Ol' Boy)	"Fool"	John Byron, Rocky Block, Thomas Rhett, Alexander Izquierdo, John Ryan, Julian Bunetta, Ryan Vojtesak, Zaire Kelsey	
2025	Thomas Rhett	About A Woman (& a Good Ol' Boy)	"Can't Love You Anymore"	Thomas Rhett, John Ryan, Julian Bunetta	
2025	Thomas Rhett	About A Woman (& a Good Ol' Boy)	"Bottle With Your Name On It"	Thomas Rhett, Andrew Haas, John Ryan, Julian Bunetta	
2025	Ruel	Non-album single	"I Can Die Now"	Ed Drewett, Joshua Coleman, Julian Bunetta, Mark Schick, Ruel Vincent Van Dijk	
2025	Good Charlotte	Motel Du Cap	"I Don't Work Here Anymore"	Benji Madden, Jake Torrey, Joel Madden, Nick Long, Andrew Goldstein	
2025	Maroon 5	Love Is Like	"Hideaway"	Adam Levine, Elof Loelv, Federico Vindver, Natalie Salomon, Sam Farrar	
2025	Maroon 5	Love Is Like	"Love Is Like" (featuring Lil Wayne)	Adam Levine, Bobby Love, Dwayne Carter, Federico Vindver, Josephine Armstead, Natalie Salomon, Nickolas Ashford, Josephine Simpson, Rio Root	
2025	Maroon 5	Love Is Like	"All Night"	Adam Levine, Federico Vindver, Michael Pollack, James Valentine, Sam Farrar	
2025	Maroon 5	Love Is Like	"Priceless" (featuring Lisa)	Adam Levine, Ali Tamposi, Federico Vindver, Michael Pollack, Lalisa Manobal, Rhea Raj, Sam Farrar	
2025	Maroon 5	Love Is Like	"I Like It" (featuring Sexyy Red)	Adam Levine, Earl Moss, Federico Vindver, Janae Wherry, Natalie Salomon, Woody Price	
2025	Maroon 5	Love Is Like	"Burn Burn Burn"	Adam Levine, Charlie Hunter, Federico Vindver, Natalie Salomon, Rio Root	
2025	Maroon 5	Love Is Like	"My Love"	Adam Levine, Elof Loelv, Federico Vindver, Sam Farrar	
2025	Maroon 5	Love Is Like	"Cigarettes"	Adam Levine, John Ryan, Phil Shaouy, Ryan Tedder, Tyler Spry	
2025	Maroon 5	Love Is Like	"Ice Cream"	Adam Levine, Federico Vindver, Jasper Harris, Natalie Salomon, Sam Farrar	
2025	Maroon 5	Love Is Like	"Closer" (with Marshmello)	Adam Levine, Federico Vindver, Griff Clawson, Natalie Salomon, Kii Kinsella, Marshmello	
2025	Beauty School Dropout	Where Did All The Butterflies Go?	"Sick Puppy"	Jacob Torrey, Bardo Novotny, Brent Michael Burdett, Cole Hutzler, Lil Aaron	
2025	Beauty School Dropout	Where Did All The Butterflies Go?	"Heart Away"	Federico Vindver, Jacob Torrey, Elof Loelv, Victoria Zaro	
2025	Dasha	Anna	"Like It Like That"	Dasha, David Garcia, Gian Stone	
2025	Alessia Cara	Nobody Wants This Season 2: The Soundtrack	"My House"	Jakob Hazell, Svante Haldin	
2025	Natalie Jane	Non-album single	"Uh Oh!" (with Loud Luxury)	Jacob Torrey, Andrew Fedyk, Joe De Pace, Tiernan Kelly, Federico Vindver,	
2025	Natalie Jane	the world i didn't want	"4ever"	Natalie Janowski, Jakob Hazell, Svante Haldin, Sophie Rose, Danielle Nicole Rubio	
2025	Natalie Jane	the world i didn't want	"finding u"	Natalie Janowski, Jakob Hazell, Svante Haldin, JBach	
2025	Natalie Jane	the world i didn't want	"fallin"	Federico Vindver, Amanda Ibanez, Elof Loelv, JBach, Natalie Janowski, Sophie Rose, Victoria Zaro	
2025	Natalie Jane	the world i didn't want	"gone"	Sophie Rose, Natalie Janowski, Elof Loelv, Victoria Zaro, Jake Torrey	
2025	Natalie Jane	the world i didn't want	"breaking me"	Federico Vindver, Amanda Ibanez, JBach, Natalie Janowski, Victoria Zaro	
2025	Natalie Jane	the world i didn't want	"how u been?"	Federico Vindver, JBach, Natalie Janowski, Victoria Zaro	
2025	Natalie Jane	the world i didn't want	"never gonna c u again"	Natalie Janowski, Jakob Hazell, Svante Haldin, Danielle Nicole Rubio	
2025	Natalie Jane	the world i didn't want	"black & white"	Federico Vindver, Amanda Ibanez, JBach, Natalie Janowski, Victoria Zaro	
2025	Honestav	Non-album single	"How I Got My Name"	Avery Freeman, Cameron Breithaupt, Jake Torrey	
2026	MGK	Lost Americana	"Times of My Life"	Travis Barker, Nick Long, Colson Baker, Andrew Migliore, Philip Shaouy	
2026	Wyatt Flores	Non-album single	"Didn't Forget" (with Waylon Wyatt)	Wyatt Flores, Gian Stone, Waylon Wyatt	
2026	Willow Avalon	Non-album single	"Easy On The Eyes"	Willow Avalon, Ali Tamposi, Konrad Snyder, Shane McAnally	
2026	Warren Zeiders	Non-album single	"Born To Be Yours"	Warren Zeiders, Ali Tamposi, Blake Pendergrass, Griff Clawson, Jonathan "JR" Rotem	
2026	Charlie Puth	Whatever's Clever! (Expanded)	"Reply to This"	Charlie Puth, Scott Harris	
2026	Maroon 5	Non-album single	"Heroine"	Adam Levine, John Ryan, Phil Plested, Michael Pollack	

=== Production credits ===
Year	Artist	Album	Song	Co-produced with	Ref(s).
2017	Maroon 5	Red Pill Blues	"Whiskey" (featuring ASAP Rocky)	John Ryan	
2017	Maroon 5	Red Pill Blues	"Cold" (featuring Future)	John Ryan, Phil Paul	
2018	Jason Mraz	Know	"Have It All"	David Hodges, Andrew Wells	
2019	Cxloe	Non-album single	"I Can't Have Nice Things"	Andrew Wells, Oskar Sikow	
2023	Mimi Webb	Non-album single	"This Moment (from Ruby Gillman, Teenage Kraken)"	DallasK	
2023	Iann Dior	Non-album single	"You Don't Even"	Federico Vindver	
2023	Iann Dior	Non-album single	"Low Tide"	Saint Kid, Elof Loelv, David Alexander	
2023	Oliver Tree	Alone In A Crowd	"Star"	Oliver Tree, Whethan	
2025	Maddox Batson	First Dance	"Problem"	Jake Torrey, Johnny Simpson, Sean Cook	
2025	Jason Derulo	Non-album single	"You DJ, I'll Drive"	Zhone	
2025	Maroon 5	Love Is Like	"Hideaway"	Federico Vindver	
2025	Maroon 5	Love Is Like	"Love Is Like" (featuring Lil Wayne)	Federico Vindver, Rio Root, Bobby Love	
2025	Maroon 5	Love Is Like	"All Night"	Federico Vindver, Sam Farrar	
2025	Maroon 5	Love Is Like	"Yes I Did"	Federico Vindver, Rio Root	
2025	Maroon 5	Love Is Like	"Priceless" (featuring Lisa)	Federico Vindver	
2025	Maroon 5	Love Is Like	"I Like It" (featuring Sexyy Red)	Federico Vindver	
2025	Maroon 5	Love Is Like	"Burn Burn Burn"	Federico Vindver, Rio Root	
2025	Maroon 5	Love Is Like	"Jealousy Problems"	Federico Vindver, Elof Loelv	
2025	Maroon 5	Love Is Like	"My Love"	Federico Vindver	
2025	Maroon 5	Love Is Like	"California"	Federico Vindver	
2025	Maroon 5	Love Is Like	"Ice Cream"	Federico Vindver	
2025	Maroon 5	Love Is Like	"Closer" (with Marshmello)	Federico Vindver, Marshmello	
2026	Willow Avalon	Non-album single	"Easy On The Eyes"	Willow Avalon, Konrad Snyder	

== Awards and nominations ==
Award	Year	Recipient(s) and nominee(s)	Category	Result	Ref(s).
ASCAP Country Music Awards	2020	"Look What God Gave Her"	Most Performed Songs	Won	
ASCAP Country Music Awards	2024	"Last Night"	Song of the Year	Won	
ASCAP Country Music Awards	2025	"After All the Bars Are Closed"	Most Performed Songs	Won	
ASCAP Country Music Awards	2025	"Beautiful As You"	Most Performed Songs	Won	
ASCAP Country Music Awards	2025	"Just in Case"	Most Performed Songs	Won	
ASCAP Country Music Awards	2025	"Love Somebody"	Most Performed Songs	Won	
ASCAP Pop Music Awards	2011	"We R Who We R"	Most Performed Songs	Won	
ASCAP Pop Music Awards	2016	"Sugar"	Most Performed Songs	Won	
ASCAP Pop Music Awards	2017	"We Don't Talk Anymore"	Most Performed Songs	Won	
ASCAP Pop Music Awards	2018	"Don't Wanna Know"	Most Performed Songs	Won	
ASCAP Pop Music Awards	2018	"Attention"	Most Performed Songs	Won	
ASCAP Pop Music Awards	2018	"Cold"	Most Performed Songs	Won	
ASCAP Pop Music Awards	2019	"Attention"	Most Performed Songs	Won	
ASCAP Pop Music Awards	2019	"How Long"	Most Performed Songs	Won	
ASCAP Pop Music Awards	2019	"Wait"	Most Performed Songs	Won	
ASCAP Pop Music Awards	2020	"Memories"	Most Performed Songs	Won	
ASCAP Pop Music Awards	2021	"Savage Love (Laxed - Siren Beat)"	Most Performed Songs	Won	
ASCAP Pop Music Awards	2022	"Beautiful Mistakes"	Most Performed Songs	Won	
ASCAP Pop Music Awards	2024	"Last Night"	Most Performed Songs	Won	
ASCAP Pop Music Awards	2024	"Single Soon"	Most Performed Songs	Won	
ASCAP Rhythm and Soul Awards	2016	"Slow Motion"	Award Winning R&B/Hip-Hop Songs	Won	
Grammy Awards	2024	"Last Night" (as songwriter)	Best Country Song	Nominated	
IHeartRadio Music Awards	2024	Himself	Songwriter of the Year	Nominated	
Spotify Secret Genius Awards	2017	Himself	Secret Genius of the Year: Songwriter	Won	
