= I Don't Think That I Like Her =

Single by Charlie Puth

from the album Charlie
- Released: September 16, 2022
- Length: 3:08
- Label: Atlantic
- Songwriters: Charlie Puth; Jacob Kasher Hindlin; Blake Slatkin; Jake Torrey
- Producer: Charlie Puth

Charlie Puth singles chronology
| "Smells Like Me" (2022) | "I Don't Think That I Like Her" (2022) | "Charlie Be Quiet!" (2022) |

Music video
- "I Don't Think That I Like Her" on YouTube

"I Don't Think That I Like Her" is a song recorded and produced by the American singer-songwriter Charlie Puth, released through Atlantic Records as the fifth single from his third studio album, Charlie (2022), on September 16, 2022. The song was written by Puth, Jacob Kasher Hindlin, Blake Slatkin, and Jake Torrey. The song features Travis Barker on drums.

== Composition and lyrics ==
"I Don't Think That I Like Her" is set in the key of B major (and later modulates to C# major) with a tempo of 186 beats per minute. Uproxx describes the song as "triumphant, [...] showcasing his incredible register". The song sees Puth discuss past relationships that "instilled a sense of paranoia in him", making his future in dating very uncertain.

== Charts ==
=== Weekly charts ===
Weekly chart performance for "I Don't Think That I Like Her"
| Chart (2022–2023) | Peak position |
|---|---|
| Japan Hot Overseas (Billboard Japan) | 1 |
| New Zealand Hot Singles (RMNZ) | 16 |
| South Korea (Circle) | 13 |
| Vietnam (Vietnam Hot 100) | 77 |

=== Monthly charts ===
Monthly chart performance for "I Don't Think That I Like Her"
| Chart (2023) | Peak position |
|---|---|
| South Korea (Circle) | 12 |

=== Year-end charts ===
2023 year-end chart performance for "I Don't Think That I Like Her"
| Chart (2023) | Position |
|---|---|
| South Korea (Circle) | 28 |

2024 year-end chart performance for "I Don't Think That I Like Her"
| Chart (2024) | Position |
|---|---|
| South Korea (Circle) | 74 |

== Certifications ==
Certifications for "I Don't Think That I Like Her"
| Region | Certification | Certified units/sales |
Streaming
| Japan (RIAJ) | Platinum | 100,000,000^{†} |
| South Korea (KMCA) | Platinum | 100,000,000^{†} |
^{†} Streaming-only figures based on certification alone.
