= He Bled Neon =

American drama film

- Directed by: Drew Kirsch
- Screenplay by: Tim Cairo; Jake Gibson
- Story by: Nate Bolotin
- Produced by: Nate Bolotin; Lucan Toh
- Starring: Joe Cole; Rita Ora; Marshawn Lynch
- Cinematography: Brett Pawlak
- Edited by: Lee Haugen; Ryan Morrison; Jered Zalman
- Music by: Zhu; Joseph Trapanese
- Production companies: XYZ Films; Rabbits Black; Two & Two Pictures
- Release date: March 16, 2026 (SXSW)
- Country: United States
- Language: English

He Bled Neon is a 2026 American action-thriller film directed by Drew Kirsch starring Joe Cole, Rita Ora, and Marshawn Lynch.

The film premiered at the 2026 South by Southwest Film & TV Festival in the Narrative Spotlight on March 16, 2026.

== Premise ==
After his estranged brother's mysterious death, Ethan's journey to Las Vegas for his brother's funeral unravels a dark web of crime, forcing him to confront his past as he delves into the city's gritty underworld to uncover the truth, risking everything he holds dear in the process.

== Cast ==
- Joe Cole as Ethan
- Rita Ora
- Marshawn Lynch
- Ismael Cruz Córdova
- Paul Wesley
- Josh Holloway

== Production ==
The film is produced by XYZ Films. It has Drew Kirsch as director, with musician Zhu composing the score in collaboration with Joseph Trapanese.

The cast is led by Joe Cole as Ethan alongside Rita Ora and Marshawn Lynch, as well as Ismael Cruz Córdova, Josh Holloway, and Paul Wesley, who replaced Jack O'Connell.

Principal photography was reported to be taking place in New Mexico in September 2024 and was completed the following month.

== Release ==
He Bled Neon premiered at the SXSW on March 16, 2026.
