= Hey Child =

2019 song by X Ambassadors

Single by X Ambassadors

from the album Orion
- Released: April 19, 2019
- Genre: Alternative rock
- Length: 3:28
- Label: Kidinakorner; Interscope
- Songwriter(s): Sam Harris
- Producer(s): Ricky Reed

X Ambassadors singles chronology
"Boom" (2019)	"Hey Child" (2019)	"Hold You Down" (2019)

Music video
- "Hey Child" on YouTube

"Hey Child" (stylized in all caps) is a song by American rock band X Ambassadors. It was released as the second single from their second studio album, Orion, on April 19, 2019.

== Composition ==
According to TuneBat.com, "Hey Child" is written in the key of F major and has a tempo of 112 beats per minute.

== Music video ==
The video opens with a shot of a rail yard. Text appears on the background, saying "Hey. Haven’t heard from you in a while. So I figured this was the best way to reach out. This is a new song. I wrote it about us."

The music starts, and the frontman, Sam Harris, appears in the middle of a street and begins singing the song.

== Charts ==
Chart (2019)	Peak position
Czech Republic (Rádio – Top 100)	8
US Hot Rock & Alternative Songs (Billboard)	47
