= Boom (X Ambassadors song) =

2019 song by X Ambassadors

Single by X Ambassadors

from the album Orion
- Released: January 25, 2019
- Genre: Alternative rock; funk rock; pop rock
- Length: 2:44
- Label: Kidinakorner; Interscope
- Songwriters: Sam Harris; Tom Peyton
- Producer: Ricky Reed

X Ambassadors singles chronology
| "Don't Stay" (2018) | "Boom" (2019) | "Hey Child" (2019) |

Music video
- "Boom" on YouTube

"Boom" (stylized in all caps) is a song by American rock band X Ambassadors. It was released as the lead single from their second studio album, Orion, on January 25, 2019.

== Composition ==
"Boom" has been described as an alternative rock, funk rock, and pop rock song.

The song's lyrics revolves around overcoming and leaving behind damaging relationships and personal struggles as well as the journey in recovering.

According to TuneBat.com, "Boom" is written in the key of E minor and has a tempo of 108 beats per minute.

== Music video ==
The music video for "Boom" opens with the three members of the band wearing outfits that resemble construction site uniforms. Lights in the background flash, spelling out "boom" in braille.

Right before the bridge, an overhead light falls on the frontman, Sam Harris, knocking him out. He gets up and begins to perform again with a bleeding temple.

== Personnel ==
=== X Ambassadors ===
- Sam Harris – lead vocals, guitar
- Casey Harris – backing vocals, keyboards, synthesizers
- Adam Levin – drums, percussion

=== Additional musicians ===
- Ricky Reed – additional guitars and bass guitar

== Critical reception ==
Reception of "Boom" was generally positive. In a review of Orion, Mark Kennedy of Associated Press calls the song "infectious." Kaitlyn Sperduto of Soundigest describes the song as having a "dance/pop vibe." Ky Kasselman says the song has a "classic X Ambassadors feel", with a "catchy beat and repetitive lyrics."

== In other media ==
- The song was used as the official theme song for the 2019 edition of WWE Stomping Grounds.
- The song was briefly played in the 2019 Nickelodeon Movies film Playing with Fire.
- The song was used in the 2020 film Sonic the Hedgehog during the bar fight bullet time sequence.
- The song was used in the in-game EA Trax for the ice hockey videogame NHL 20.
- This song was heard, during the fourth season, of NBC's World of Dance.
- The song was played during the closing credits of the NFL Films 2021 film NFL Championship Chase.
- This song is used in the intro to Big Noon Kickoff since 2021.
- This song was used in the soundtrack for NASCAR 21: Ignition.
- The song was used in a 2026 Zepbound commercial.
- This song is heard, sometimes, when NBC Sunday Night Football heads into a commercial break; this also occurred, at one point, during their Super Bowl LX coverage.

== Charts ==
=== Weekly charts ===
Weekly chart performance for "Boom"
| Chart (2019) | Peak position |
|---|---|
| Czech Republic Airplay (ČNS IFPI) | 7 |
| Mexico Ingles Airplay (Billboard) | 3 |
| US Rock & Alternative Airplay (Billboard) | 30 |
| US Hot Rock & Alternative Songs (Billboard) | 24 |

=== Year-end charts ===
Year-end chart performance for "Boom"
| Chart (2019) | Position |
|---|---|
| US Adult Alternative Songs (Billboard) | 41 |

== Certifications ==
Certifications for "Boom"
| Region | Certification | Certified units/sales |
|---|---|---|
| United States (RIAA) | Gold | 500,000^{‡} |
^{‡} Sales+streaming figures based on certification alone.
