= Smells Like Me =

Single by Charlie Puth

from the album Charlie
- Released: September 2, 2022
- Length: 3:24
- Label: Atlantic
- Songwriter(s): Charlie Puth; Jacob Kasher Hindlin
- Producer(s): Charlie Puth

Charlie Puth singles chronology
"Left and Right" (2022)	"Smells Like Me" (2022)	"I Don't Think That I Like Her" (2022)

Music video
- "Smells Like Me" on YouTube

"Smells Like Me" is a song recorded and produced by American singer-songwriter Charlie Puth. Released on September 2, 2022, through Atlantic Records as the fourth single from his third studio album, Charlie (2022), the song was written by Puth and American songwriter Jacob Kasher Hindlin.

== Composition and lyrics ==
"Smells Like Me" is set in the key of F# major with a tempo of 108 beats per minute. It features "a bright melody, subtle guitars, and twinkling keys", and was described by Uproxx as "a mix of modern pop and an '80s synth ballad". The song sees Puth discuss a former relationship, singing that he hopes his ex-partner's "jacket smells like me".

== Charts ==
=== Weekly charts ===
Weekly chart performance for "Smells Like Me"
Chart (2022)	Peak position
Japan Hot Overseas (Billboard Japan)	12
New Zealand Hot Singles (RMNZ)	14
South Korea (Circle)	147

=== Monthly charts ===
Monthly chart performance for "Smells Like Me"
Chart (2022)	Peak position
South Korea (Circle)	153
