= Light Switch (song) =

2022 single by Charlie Puth

Single by Charlie Puth

from the album Charlie
- Released: January 20, 2022
- Recorded: 2021
- Genre: Electropop; synth-pop; dance
- Length: 3:05
- Label: Atlantic
- Songwriters: Charlie Puth; Jacob Kasher Hindlin; Jake Torrey
- Producer: Charlie Puth

Charlie Puth singles chronology
| "After All" (2021) | "Light Switch" (2022) | "That's Hilarious" (2022) |

Music video
- "Light Switch" on YouTube

"Light Switch" is a song recorded and produced by American singer-songwriter Charlie Puth. It was released on January 20, 2022, as the lead single from his third studio album, Charlie (2022). Puth wrote the song alongside Jacob Kasher Hindlin and Jake Torrey. A funky, uptempo track, the song lyrically sees Puth crooning about his attraction to a love interest. The song was teased several times on his TikTok account, causing the video to go viral on the platform, with many videos being made using the audio.

Commercially, "Light Switch" reached number one in Singapore, and charted in the top ten in Malaysia and Vietnam. It reached the top 40 in Canada, worldwide, Ireland, Lithuania, New Zealand, Sweden, Switzerland, and the United Kingdom, and peaked at number 27 on the Billboard Hot 100.

== Background ==
In November 2021, Puth revealed "a single" would come out in 2022 by responding to a comment on Twitter. "Light Switch" then was teased on TikTok that same month, showing him documenting the production of the song. The video went viral on the platform, with a presave for the song made available on November 24, 2021. Throughout the rest of 2021, Puth kept teasing the song in various videos on TikTok. On January 18, 2022, Puth revealed the release date and cover art for "Light Switch" on his social media accounts.

== Music video ==
A few hours after the song's release, an official music video for the song premiered on Puth's YouTube channel. The music video was directed by Christian Breslauer. The music video begins with Puth out of shape after an implied breakup, watching TV on his recliner. A Tae Bo instructor (Billy Blanks) he watches crawls out of the TV and encourages him to get back into shape with some workouts and other activities, such as fence painting, cleaning, and buying $100 worth of Bitcoin. Puth is later shown performing the last chorus to his ex in front of a bright sign that says "SORRY", only to find out the ex has gotten a new, out of shape, boyfriend. The trainer arrives, leading Puth away. In the comments of the video on YouTube, Puth says, "I created the concept for this music video based on an idea I had and shared with the incredible director, Christian Breslauer. I wanted to humorously portray all the things we sometimes try to change about ourselves in order to capture that unrequited love, when deep down we should be changing our lives only to benefit ourselves and no one else." The music video also includes product placements from paint company Benjamin Moore and the cryptocurrency company Coinbase.

== Personnel ==
- Charlie Puth – vocals, producer, mixing engineer
- Jan Ozveren – guitar

== Charts ==
=== Weekly charts ===
Chart performance for "Light Switch"
| Chart (2022) | Peak position |
|---|---|
| Argentina Hot 100 (Billboard) | 100 |
| Australia (ARIA) | 20 |
| Austria (Ö3 Austria Top 40) | 49 |
| Belgium (Ultratop 50 Wallonia) | 16 |
| Canada Hot 100 (Billboard) | 17 |
| Canada AC (Billboard) | 13 |
| Canada CHR/Top 40 (Billboard) | 10 |
| Canada Hot AC (Billboard) | 7 |
| Croatia International (HRT) | 2 |
| Czech Republic Airplay (ČNS IFPI) | 49 |
| Denmark (Tracklisten) | 20 |
| France Airplay (SNEP) | 59 |
| Germany (GfK) | 62 |
| Global 200 (Billboard) | 21 |
| Greece International (IFPI) | 48 |
| Hungary (Rádiós Top 40) | 28 |
| Iceland (Tónlistinn) | 21 |
| Ireland (IRMA) | 25 |
| Japan (Japan Hot 100) | 84 |
| Lebanon (OLT20) | 20 |
| Lithuania (AGATA) | 26 |
| Malaysia (RIM) | 5 |
| Mexico Ingles Airplay (Billboard) | 24 |
| Netherlands (Dutch Top 40) | 29 |
| Netherlands (Single Top 100) | 43 |
| New Zealand (Recorded Music NZ) | 28 |
| Norway (VG-lista) | 13 |
| Philippines (Billboard) | 21 |
| Portugal (AFP) | 73 |
| Romania Airplay (Media Forest) | 4 |
| Romania TV Airplay (Media Forest) | 10 |
| Russia Airplay (TopHit) | 14 |
| Singapore (RIAS) | 1 |
| Slovakia Airplay (ČNS IFPI) | 21 |
| Slovakia Singles Digital (ČNS IFPI) | 80 |
| South Africa Streaming (TOSAC) | 70 |
| South Korea (Gaon) | 103 |
| Sweden (Sverigetopplistan) | 36 |
| Switzerland (Schweizer Hitparade) | 40 |
| UK Singles (Official Charts) | 25 |
| Ukraine Airplay (TopHit) | 67 |
| US Billboard Hot 100 | 27 |
| US Adult Contemporary (Billboard) | 13 |
| US Adult Pop Airplay (Billboard) | 9 |
| US Dance Airplay (Billboard) | 34 |
| US Pop Airplay (Billboard) | 11 |
| Vietnam (Vietnam Hot 100) | 7 |

=== Monthly charts ===
Monthly chart performance for "Light Switch"
| Chart (2022) | Position |
|---|---|
| South Korea (Gaon) | 106 |

=== Year-end charts ===
2022 year-end chart performance for "Light Switch"
| Chart (2022) | Position |
|---|---|
| Australia (ARIA) | 88 |
| Belgium (Ultratop Flanders) | 153 |
| Belgium (Ultratop Wallonia) | 99 |
| Canada (Canadian Hot 100) | 58 |
| Denmark (Tracklisten) | 80 |
| Global 200 (Billboard) | 111 |
| Russia Airplay (TopHit) | 51 |
| South Korea (Circle) | 134 |
| US Adult Contemporary (Billboard) | 27 |
| US Adult Top 40 (Billboard) | 26 |
| US Mainstream Top 40 (Billboard) | 40 |
| Vietnam (Vietnam Hot 100) | 68 |

== Certifications ==
Certifications for "Light Switch"
| Region | Certification | Certified units/sales |
|---|---|---|
| Australia (ARIA) | 2× Platinum | 140,000^{‡} |
| Austria (IFPI Austria) | Gold | 15,000^{‡} |
| Canada (Music Canada) | 3× Platinum | 240,000^{‡} |
| Denmark (IFPI Danmark) | Gold | 45,000^{‡} |
| France (SNEP) | Gold | 100,000^{‡} |
| New Zealand (RMNZ) | Platinum | 30,000^{‡} |
| Norway (IFPI Norway) | Gold | 30,000^{‡} |
| Poland (ZPAV) | Gold | 25,000^{‡} |
| Portugal (AFP) | Gold | 5,000^{‡} |
| Spain (Promusicae) | Gold | 30,000^{‡} |
| United Kingdom (BPI) | Gold | 400,000^{‡} |
| United States (RIAA) | Platinum | 1,000,000^{‡} |
^{‡} Sales+streaming figures based on certification alone.

== Release history ==
Release history for "Light Switch"
| Region | Date | Format(s) | Version | Label | Ref. |
|---|---|---|---|---|---|
| Various | January 20, 2022 | Digital download; streaming | Original | Atlantic | |
| Italy | January 20, 2022 | Radio airplay | Original | Warner | |
| United States | January 24, 2022 | Adult contemporary radio | Original | Atlantic | |
| United States | January 25, 2022 | Contemporary hit radio | Original | Atlantic | |
| Various | February 4, 2022 | Digital download; streaming | Instrumental | Atlantic | |
| Various | February 18, 2022 | Digital download; streaming | Acoustic | Atlantic | |
| Various | March 4, 2022 | Digital download; streaming | Tiësto remix | Atlantic | |
