= Hold You Down (X Ambassadors song) =

2019 song by X Ambassadors

Single by X Ambassadors

from the album Orion
- Released: May 31, 2019
- Genre: Rock
- Length: 3:18
- Label: Kidinakorner; Interscope
- Songwriters: Sam Harris; Casey Harris; Adam Levin; Malay; Ricky Reed; Jacob Kasher
- Producers: Ricky Reed; Malay

X Ambassadors singles chronology
"Hey Child" (2019)	"Hold You Down" (2019)	"Optimistic" (2019)

Music video
- "Hold You Down" on YouTube

"Hold You Down" is a song by American rock band X Ambassadors. It was released as the third and final single from their second studio album, Orion, on May 31, 2019 where it appears as the closing track.

== Composition and lyrical interpretation ==
According to TuneBat.com, Hold You Down is written in the key of D♭ minor and has a tempo of 79 beats per minute.

The song is described by frontman Sam Harris as "a song about devotion. Saying to that one person... 'no matter what happens, I will always be there for you.'" In this case Harris refers to the relationship between him and his brother and keyboardist Casey Harris.

== Music video ==
The music video was released on the same day as the song. The video begins with footage of Sam and Casey Harris walking up to a piano where the brothers begin performing the song. A montage of home footage of the brothers growing up in their hometown of Ithaca, New York accompanies the song. The latter half showcases the band throughout the years and ending with a concert performance.

== Charts ==
Chart (2019)	Peak position
US Adult Pop Airplay (Billboard)	19
US Adult Alternative Airplay (Billboard)	25
US Alternative Airplay (Billboard)	35
US Hot Rock & Alternative Songs (Billboard)	24
