= Left and Right (Charlie Puth song) =

Single by Charlie Puth featuring Jung Kook

from the album Charlie
- Released: June 24, 2022
- Genre: Pop
- Length: 2:34
- Label: Atlantic
- Songwriters: Charlie Puth; Jacob Kasher Hindlin
- Producer: Charlie Puth

Charlie Puth singles chronology
"That's Hilarious" (2022)	"Left and Right" (2022)	"Smells Like Me" (2022)

Jung Kook singles chronology
"Stay Alive" (2022)	"Left and Right" (2022)	"Dreamers" (2022)

Music video
- "Left and Right" on YouTube

"Left and Right" is a song by American singer Charlie Puth featuring South Korean singer Jung Kook of BTS, released through Atlantic Records on June 24, 2022, as the third single from Puth's third studio album Charlie. It was written by Puth and Jacob Kasher Hindlin with the former also serving as producer. Available digitally and as a limited edition CD and cassette, the duet marks the second time Puth and Jung Kook have collaborated, the first being their performance of "We Don't Talk Anymore" at the Genie Music Awards in 2018.

A catchy, upbeat pop song, the lyrics of "Left and Right" focus on memories of a past love and how consumed by thoughts of that former relationship one can become. An accompanying music video was released the same day as the song and depicts Puth and Jung Kook visiting a therapist's office for help with their lovesickness.

The single debuted at number 1 in India, the Philippines, and Vietnam; number 2 in Malaysia and Singapore; and number 3 in Hungary, Indonesia, and Taiwan. It peaked at number 22 on the Billboard Hot 100 in the United States and debuted at number 5 on the Billboard Global 200, earning Puth and Jung Kook their first top-10 entries on the latter. The single also spent three consecutive weeks at number 1 on the Billboard Japan Hot Overseas chart. It has been certified Platinum in Canada and Gold in the US.

== Background and release ==
Jung Kook's appreciation for Charlie Puth's music has been documented numerous times, going as far back as 2015. He first released a solo cover of Puth's "We Don't Talk Anymore" in 2016, which caught the singer's attention. A history of subsequent communication between the two via Twitter, and a second cover with bandmate Jimin in mid-2017, culminated in a joint performance of the song at the Genie Music Awards in 2018.

Puth originally teased "Left and Right" as a solo track in February 2022 on TikTok. In April, he tweeted about a dream he had, of BTS featuring on the song, increasing speculation that a project between both parties was in the works. He began hinting at an upcoming collaboration with an unnamed artist through various clues in subsequent videos on the platform in June. During an interview at iHeartRadio's Wango Tango on the 5th of that month, Puth revealed he had indeed collaborated with a K-pop artist, but did not know when the song would be released; the collaborator remained unnamed at the time. On June 17, Puth simultaneously confirmed the collaboration's occurrence and that the contributing artist was Jung Kook of BTS, with the release of the first official teaser on TikTok. In the clip, he video-calls the aforementioned, who is in a recording studio, and asks him to sing various lines from the song—the full snippet plays at the end—while standing to the left of the microphone, and then the right. Puth also announced that the single would be released on the 24th if it reached 500,000 pre-saves. In a later interview with Billboard, Puth commented on the process saying, "The song was done. I sat on it for a couple of weeks and then I texted him the mp3. We were able to really get it done."

Two additional teasers followed via Puth's Instagram on the 23rd. In the first, he sings the lines "Memories follow me left and right/ I can feel you over here/ I can feel you over here/ You take up every corner of my mind". The second showed both singers "bob[bing] their heads while seated in an old sedan and beatbox[ing] along to the song's beat while using the click of the car door locks as an additional rhythm track". The single was released as promised the following week, at midnight.

== Music and lyrics ==
"Left and Right" is a "breezy, sentimental", "bubbly pop tune" with Puth "croon[ing] in his signature falsetto" and featured vocals from Jung Kook of BTS. It was written by Puth and Jacob Kasher Hindlin, with the former also responsible for production. The song's lyrics find both singers "pining over a past relationship" and "overwhelmed with thoughts of their respective exes" as they sing the lines "Memories follow me left and right/ I can feel you over here/ I can feel you over here/ You take up every corner of my mind". The song's "minimalistic pop production accentuates the singers' mellow, dulcet vocalizations", meshing "fresh percussion-guitar sounds" with a "bright, rhythmic melody". The chorus and hook both utilize panning, with the audio moving from left to right, in a similar vein to "Bohemian Rhapsody" by Queen. According to Puth, the song should be listened to with headphones "to get the full effect" of the audio technique.

== Reception ==
=== Commercial performance ===
"Left and Right" debuted at number 49 on the Week 26 issue of the South Korean Gaon Digital Chart as the highest-charting new entry for the period dated June 19 to 25. It also entered the corresponding issues of the Download and Streaming charts at numbers 5 and 181 respectively. Two weeks later, it peaked at number 15 on both the Digital and Streaming charts. In Japan, the single debuted at number 2 on the Oricon Daily Digital Single Chart for June 24, with 6,236 downloads, and number 4 on the subsequent weekly chart issue dated July 4, with 9,981 cumulative downloads for the period June 20 to 26. It entered the top 20 of the Weekly Streaming Chart in its second week, with 3,304,935 streams. "Left and Right" also debuted on the Billboard Japan Hot 100 chart issue dated June 29 at number 24—its peak. It was the second most-downloaded song of the week, accumulating 9,907 sales with only three days of availability. The single also debuted atop the Hot Overseas chart for the same issue date and spent three consecutive weeks at number 1.

In the United States, "Left and Right" debuted at number 22 on the Billboard Hot 100, for the week post-dated July 9, 2022, as the highest new entry on the chart. It was the best-selling song of its release week and topped the corresponding issue of the component Digital Song Sales chart. The single charted for 17 consecutive weeks on the ranking, and received Gold certification from the Recording Industry Association of America (RIAA) in November, for surpassing 500,000 sales in the country.

Globally, "Left and Right" accumulated 76.5 million streams and debuted at number 5 on the Billboard Global 200, earning Puth and Jung Kook their first Top 10 entries on the chart. It also entered the Global Excl. US chart at number 2, Puth's first top-10 in territories outside of the US and Jung Kook's second after "Stay Alive". The single sold 45,000 downloads worldwide and was the best-selling song for the week ending June 30, passing the next best-performing single, Kate Bush's "Running Up That Hill", which was returning to the chart after nearly four decades.

=== Accolades ===
In July, Esquire ranked "Left and Right" at number 9 on its list of the "11 Best Songs for Summer '22", while Cleveland.com included it at number 15 on its "Song of the Summer 2022" list published in August. Billboard included the song on its year-end list of the 17 best collaborations of 2022.

Awards & Nominations for Left and Right
Award ceremony	Year	Category	Result	Ref.
BMI Pop Awards	2023	Most Performed Songs of the Year	Won	
iHeartRadio Music Awards	2023	Best Music Video	Nominated	
Japan Gold Disc Awards	2023	Song of the Year by Streaming – Western	Won	
MTV Video Music Awards	2022	Song of Summer	Nominated	
People's Choice Awards	2022	The Collaboration Song of 2022	Won	
People's Choice Awards	2022	The Music Video of 2022	Nominated	
SEC Awards (Note: The SEC Awards, formerly known as the Séries em Cena Awards, is a Brazilian award show that honors achievements in music, film, television, and internet culture in Brazil and globally.)	2023	International Song of the Year	Won	

== Music video ==
Puth shared a teaser clip from the music video a day prior to its release. The montage featured both singers dressed in "a series of outfits as they sing back-to-back and Jung Kook tries to listen to a conversation on the other side of a wall using a glass and hangs on to a car hood for dear life as it speeds through town".

Initially announced for a simultaneous debut alongside the single, the music video premiered on YouTube an hour after the single went live on digital platforms on June 24. Directed by Drew Kirsch, the "colourful" visual opens with Puth visiting the office of an elderly male therapist identified as "The Love Doctor" in an attempt to fix his heartache. He narrates his thoughts about his ex to the man through the song's lyrics. Jung Kook appears next, in solo shots for his verse and joint scenes with Puth at the doctor's office, as the passenger in a car driven by the latter—at one point he is seen "playfully seated on the hood of the car" before sliding off the moving vehicle—and singing back-to-back with Puth in a white room about their lovesickness. A QR code and special phone number are later shown on-screen, encouraging fans to text it to receive bonus content from Puth. The video also contains product placement for Chime, a Gen Z-targeted financial company.

Rolling Stone India's Divyansha Dongre wrote that the music video "captures the duo's mischievous, playful aura vividly." Jason P. Frank of Vulture felt that "the idea behind this video is not super-clear. What is clear is that Jung Kook is overflowing with charisma and also that his lip ring is hot."

== Live performances ==
Puth performed "Left and Right" live for the first time—he sang the song solo—during his appearance on the Today Show on July 8, 2022, as part of the Citi Concert Series. On September 24, he performed the song solo again, as part of his set at the Global Citizen Festival in New York City for the event's 10th anniversary. The following month, Puth appeared on the October 12 episode of The Tonight Show Starring Jimmy Fallon and performed the song together with "Loser". He was the guest performer for the November 15 episode of Season 22 of The Voice and sang a medley comprising "Left and Right" and "That's Hilarious".

== Track listing and formats ==
- Cassette/CD single (Original and Alternate Cover)/Digital download/Flexi disc
1. "Left and Right" – 2:34
- Deluxe 2-Disc CD Package
1. "Left and Right" – 2:34
2. "Left and Right" (Instrumental) – 2:32
- Digital single (Acapella)
1. "Left and Right" (Acapella) – 2:34
- Digital single (Instrumental)
1. "Left and Right" (Instrumental) – 2:32
- Sam Feldt Remix
1. "Left and Right" (Sam Feldt Remix) – 2:42
- Galantis Remix
1. "Left and Right" (Galantis Remix) – 2:42

== Personnel ==
Adapted from the CD single liner notes.

Mixed at Larrabee Studios, North Hollywood, California.

- Chris Galland – mix engineering
  - Scott Desmarais – assistant mix engineering
  - Rob Florent – assistant mix engineering
  - Jeremie Inhaber – assistant mix engineering
- Jacob Kasher Hindlin – songwriting
- Jung Kook – vocals
- Emerson Mancini (Note: credited as Michelle Mancini; song was released prior to Mancini's coming out as transgender.) – mastering
- Manny Marroquin – mixing
- Jan Ozervan – guitar
- Pdogg – recording engineering
- Charlie Puth – vocals, songwriting, production, mixing
- Benjamin Sedano – recording engineering

== Charts ==
=== Weekly charts ===
Weekly chart performance
Chart (2022)	Peak position
Argentina Hot 100 (Billboard)	94
Australia (ARIA)	19
Austria (Ö3 Austria Top 40)	71
Belgium (Ultratop 50 Flanders)	41
Canada Hot 100 (Billboard)	17
Canada AC (Billboard)	50
Canada CHR/Top 40 (Billboard)	9
Canada Hot AC (Billboard)	21
Czech Republic Airplay (ČNS IFPI)	18
France (SNEP)	150
Germany (GfK)	61
Global 200 (Billboard)	5
Greece International (IFPI)	34
Hong Kong (Billboard)	9
Hungary (Single Top 40)	3
India (Billboard)	9
India International Singles (IMI)	1
Indonesia (Billboard)	3
Ireland (IRMA)	33
Japan Hot 100 (Billboard)	13
Japan Combined Singles (Oricon)	27
Lithuania (AGATA)	18
Malaysia International (RIM)	2
Netherlands (Single Top 100)	100
New Zealand (Recorded Music NZ)	15
Philippines (Billboard)	1
Portugal (AFP)	47
Romania (Radiomonitor)	11
Singapore (RIAS)	2
Slovakia (Radio Top 100)	77
Slovakia (Singles Digitál Top 100)	58
South Africa (RISA)	73
South Korea (Circle)	15
Sweden Heatseeker (Sverigetopplistan)	19
Switzerland (Schweizer Hitparade)	46
Taiwan (Billboard)	3
UK Singles (Official Charts)	41
US Billboard Hot 100	22
US Adult Contemporary (Billboard)	24
US Adult Pop Airplay (Billboard)	9
US Pop Airplay (Billboard)	11
Vietnam (Vietnam Hot 100)	1

=== Monthly charts ===
Monthly chart performance
Chart (2022)	Position
South Korea (Circle)	26

=== Year-end charts ===
Year-end chart performance
Chart (2022)	Position
Canada (Canadian Hot 100)	65
Global 200 (Billboard)	106
South Korea (Circle)	99
US Adult Top 40 (Billboard)	33
US Digital Song Sales (Billboard)	30
US Mainstream Top 40 (Billboard)	44
Vietnam (Vietnam Hot 100)	38

Year-end chart performance
Chart (2023)	Position
South Korea (Circle)	142

== Certifications ==
Certifications
Region	Certification	Certified units/sales
Australia (ARIA)	Platinum	70,000^{‡}
Canada (Music Canada)	2× Platinum	160,000^{‡}
Italy (FIMI)	Gold	50,000^{‡}
New Zealand (RMNZ)	Platinum	30,000^{‡}
Spain (Promusicae)	Gold	30,000^{‡}
United Kingdom (BPI)	Silver	200,000^{‡}
United States (RIAA)	Gold	500,000^{‡}
Streaming
Japan (RIAJ)	Gold	50,000,000^{†}
^{‡} Sales+streaming figures based on certification alone.^{†} Streaming-only figures based on certification alone.

== Release history ==
Release dates and formats
Region	Date	Format(s)	Version	Label	Ref.
Various	June 24, 2022	CD single; digital download; streaming	Original	Atlantic	
United States	July 5, 2022	Adult contemporary radio; Contemporary hit radio	Original	Atlantic	
Various	August 12, 2022	Digital download; streaming	Sam Feldt Remix	Atlantic	
Various	August 19, 2022	Digital download; streaming	Acapella	Atlantic	
United States	August 26, 2022	Cassette	Original	Atlantic	
Various	September 9, 2022	Digital download; streaming	Galantis Remix	Atlantic	
