= That's Hilarious =

Single by Charlie Puth

from the album Charlie
- Released: April 8, 2022
- Length: 2:26
- Label: Atlantic
- Songwriter(s): Charlie Puth; Jacob Kasher Hindlin
- Producer(s): Charlie Puth

Charlie Puth singles chronology
"Light Switch" (2022)	"That's Hilarious" (2022)	"Left and Right" (2022)

Music video
- "That's Hilarious" on YouTube

"That's Hilarious" is a song recorded and produced by American singer-songwriter Charlie Puth. It was released through Atlantic Records as the second single from his third studio album, Charlie, on April 8, 2022. Puth wrote the song with Jacob Kasher Hindlin. Before the release of this emotionally-charged power ballad single, a tear-filled Charlie Puth warned his audience that the song was the toughest song for him to write, record, and release, as it chronicled some of the darkest moments of his life going through a difficult breakup.

== Charts ==
=== Weekly charts ===
Chart performance for "That's Hilarious"
Chart (2022)	Peak position
Canada (Canadian Hot 100)	80
Global 200 (Billboard)	96
Malaysia International (RIM)	8
New Zealand Hot Singles (RMNZ)	2
Singapore (RIAS)	13
South Korea (Billboard)	20
South Korea (Gaon)	25
Sweden Heatseeker (Sverigetopplistan)	9
UK Singles (OCC)	100
US Bubbling Under Hot 100 Singles (Billboard)	9
Vietnam (Vietnam Hot 100)	13

=== Monthly charts ===
Monthly chart performance for "That's Hilarious"
Chart (2022)	Position
South Korea (Gaon)	25

=== Year-end charts ===
2022 year-end chart performance for "That's Hilarious"
Chart (2022)	Position
South Korea (Circle)	42

2023 year-end chart performance for "That's Hilarious"
Chart (2023)	Position
South Korea (Circle)	38

== Certifications ==
Certifications for "That's Hilarious"
Region	Certification	Certified units/sales
Streaming
South Korea (KMCA)	Platinum	100,000,000^{†}
^{†} Streaming-only figures based on certification alone.
