= Drew Kirsch =

American music video director

- Born: La Jolla, California, U.S.
- Occupations: Music video director, commercial director
- Years active: 2013–present

Drew Kirsch is an American film and music video director.

== Career ==
Kirsch is directing his debut feature film, He Bled Neon, an upcoming thriller produced by XYZ Films and Two & Two Pictures. The film stars Rita Ora, Joe Cole, and Paul Wesley. He is known for his work with Taylor Swift, Shakira, Imagine Dragons, J. Cole, Machine Gun Kelly, Charlie Puth and Louis the Child. He was nominated for the Best Direction at the 2019 MTV Video Music Awards for Taylor Swift's "You Need to Calm Down". He was listed as one of "The 9 Hottest Hunks on the VMAs 2019 Red Carpet" by Us Weekly in 2019.

== Filmography ==
Film

- He Bled Neon (2026)

Music video

Year	Title	Artist	Notes
2024	"A Tear In Space (Airlock)"	Glass Animals	Co-directed with Taylor Fauntleroy
2023	"3D"	Jungkook featuring Jack Harlow	
2023	"Red Flags"	Mimi Webb	
2023	"DAKOTA"	Red Leather	
2022	"Sharks"	Imagine Dragons	
2022	"Run"	YG featuring Tyga, 21 Savage and Bia	
2022	"Left And Right"	Charlie Puth featuring Jungkook	
2022	"Emo Girl"	Machine Gun Kelly featuring Willow Smith	
2022	"Scared Money"	YG featuring J. Cole and Moneybagg Yo	
2021	"You Deserve It All"	John Legend	
2020	"Baby"	Madison Beer	
2020	"Girlfriend"	Charlie Puth	
2020	"Summertime"	Orville Peck	Co-directed with Taylor Fauntleroy
2020	"Me Gusta"	Shakira and Anuel AA	
2020	"Heartbreak Weather"	Niall Horan	
2020	"Sad Tonight"	Chelsea Cutler	
2019	"Lover"	Taylor Swift	Co-directed with Taylor Swift
2019	"You Need to Calm Down"	Taylor Swift	Co-directed with Taylor Swift
2019	"Are You Bored Yet?"	Wallows featuring Clairo	
2019	"Love Me Less"	Max Schneider featuring Quinn XCII	
2019	"BITCH"	Lennon Stella	
2018	"Lick It"	Valentino Khan	
2018	"Lost in My Mind"	Rüfüs Du Sol	
2018	"66"	Lil Yachty featuring Trippie Redd	
2018	"All the Kids Are Depressed"	Jeremy Zucker	
2018	"Cool"	Felix Jaehn featuring Marc E. Bassy and Gucci Mane	
2016	"The Fall"	Bryce Vine	

== Accolades ==
Year	Award	Category	Title	Result	Ref.
2019	MTV Video Music Award	Best Direction	"You Need to Calm Down"	Nominated	
