= Orion (X Ambassadors album) =

2019 studio album by X Ambassadors

Studio album by X Ambassadors
- Released: June 14, 2019
- Recorded: 2017–2019
- Genre: Pop rock; indie pop; alternative rock; R&B
- Length: 35:27
- Label: Kidinakorner; Interscope
- Producer: X Ambassadors (also exec.); Andrew Wells; Jared Scharff; Ricky Reed; Earwulf; Malay

X Ambassadors chronology
VHS (2015)	Orion (2019)	Belong (2020)

Singles from Orion
- 1. "Boom" Released: January 25, 2019; 2. "Hey Child" Released: April 19, 2019; 3. "Hold You Down" Released: May 31, 2019

Orion (stylized in all caps) is the second studio album by American rock band X Ambassadors. It was released on June 14, 2019 through KIDinaKORNER and Interscope Records. The album follows X Ambassadors' first studio album, VHS (2015), and is the first album to feature the band as a trio since Noah Feldshuh took a personal break from X Ambassadors in 2016. Three singles have been released from Orion: "Boom", "Hey Child", and "Hold You Down". The album features production from musicians such as Ricky Reed and Malay.

== Background ==
X Ambassadors released their debut album, VHS, on June 30, 2015. The band went on tour to support the album, where they wrote several songs that became singles. On January 26, 2018, the song "Joyful" was released. Later that day, the album of the same name was announced. The album was originally slated for an April 2018 release. On February 2, the second single "Don't Stay" was released.

However, on April 19, 2019, roughly a year after the original planned release date, the band announced that they had cancelled the album "Joyful". Singer Sam Harris stated in an interview with Billboard that the album was cancelled because "it didn't feel like it fully represented where [they] were at."

== Promotion and tour ==
On January 24, 2019, the trio released the lead single from Orion titled "Boom". On April 19, X Ambassadors released another single, titled "Hey Child". A tour supporting Orion was announced on May 13, with 27 dates around the USA with more tour dates being added five days later.

The track listing was released through X Ambassadors' social media accounts on May 28, 2019. The next day, the band announced that the song "Happy Home" would be on the Target exclusive version.

== Track listing ==
Orion – Standard edition
No.	Title	Writer(s)	Producer(s)	Length
1.	"Hey Child"	X Ambassadors; Andrew Wells	Wells; Jared Scharff	3:28
2.	"Confidence" (featuring K.Flay)	X Ambassadors; Dylan Cleary-Krell; Julian Gramma; Kristine Flaherty	X Ambassadors; Ricky Reed; Gramma; Dez Wright	2:53
3.	"Quicksand"	X Ambassadors; Eric Frederic; Jayson DeZuzio	X Ambassadors; DeZuzio	3:09
4.	"Boom"	X Ambassadors; Frederic; Thomas Eriksen; Tom Peyton	X Ambassadors; Reed; Earwulf	2:44
5.	"Rule"	X Ambassadors; James Ryan Ho	X Ambassadors; Malay	3:25
6.	"History"	X Ambassadors	Reed; Nate Mercereau	4:17
7.	"Recover"	X Ambassadors; Frederic; Justin Tranter	X Ambassadors; Reed; Jussifer	3:32
8.	"Wasteland"	X Ambassadors; Frederic	X Ambassadors; Reed; Mercereau	3:08
9.	"Shadows"	X Ambassadors; Frederic; DeZuzio; Emily Warren	X Ambassadors; DeZuzio	3:14
10.	"I Don't Know How to Pray"	X Ambassadors	X Ambassadors	2:13
11.	"Hold You Down"	X Ambassadors; Frederic; Jacob Kasher; Ho	X Ambassadors; Reed; Malay	3:17
Total length:				35:27

Orion – Target exclusive bonus track
No.	Title	Writer(s)	Producer(s)	Length
12.	"Happy Home"	X Ambassadors; Darkchild	X Ambassadors; Darkchild; ReezyTunez	3:21
Total length:				38:48

Notes

- All track titles are stylized in all caps.
- The bonus track "Happy Home" would later appear on the band's 2020 EP Belong.

== Personnel ==
Adapted credits from the liner notes of Orion.

=== X Ambassadors ===
- Sam Harris – lead and backing vocals, guitars, bass guitar
- Casey Harris – piano, backing vocals, keyboards, synthesizers
- Adam Levin – drums, percussion

=== Additional musicians ===
- K.Flay – additional vocals (on "Confidence")
- Jayson DeZuzio – additional vocals (on "Quicksand" and "Shadows")
- Ricky Reed – guitars, bass (on "Boom")
- Shaina Evoniuk – viola (on "History")
- Lewis Patzner – cello (on "History")

=== Production ===
- Andrew Wells – engineering
- Ethan Shumaker – engineering
- Manny Marroquin – mixing
- Chris Galland – mixing
- Joe LaPorta – mastering

=== Artwork ===
- Lauren Kallen – photography
- Dina Hovsepian – CD design
- Christopher Hill – lighting

== Charts ==
Chart (2019)	Peak position
Lithuanian Albums (AGATA)	95
US Billboard 200	125
US Top Rock Albums (Billboard)	25
