= Natalie Jane =

American singer-songwriter (born 2004)

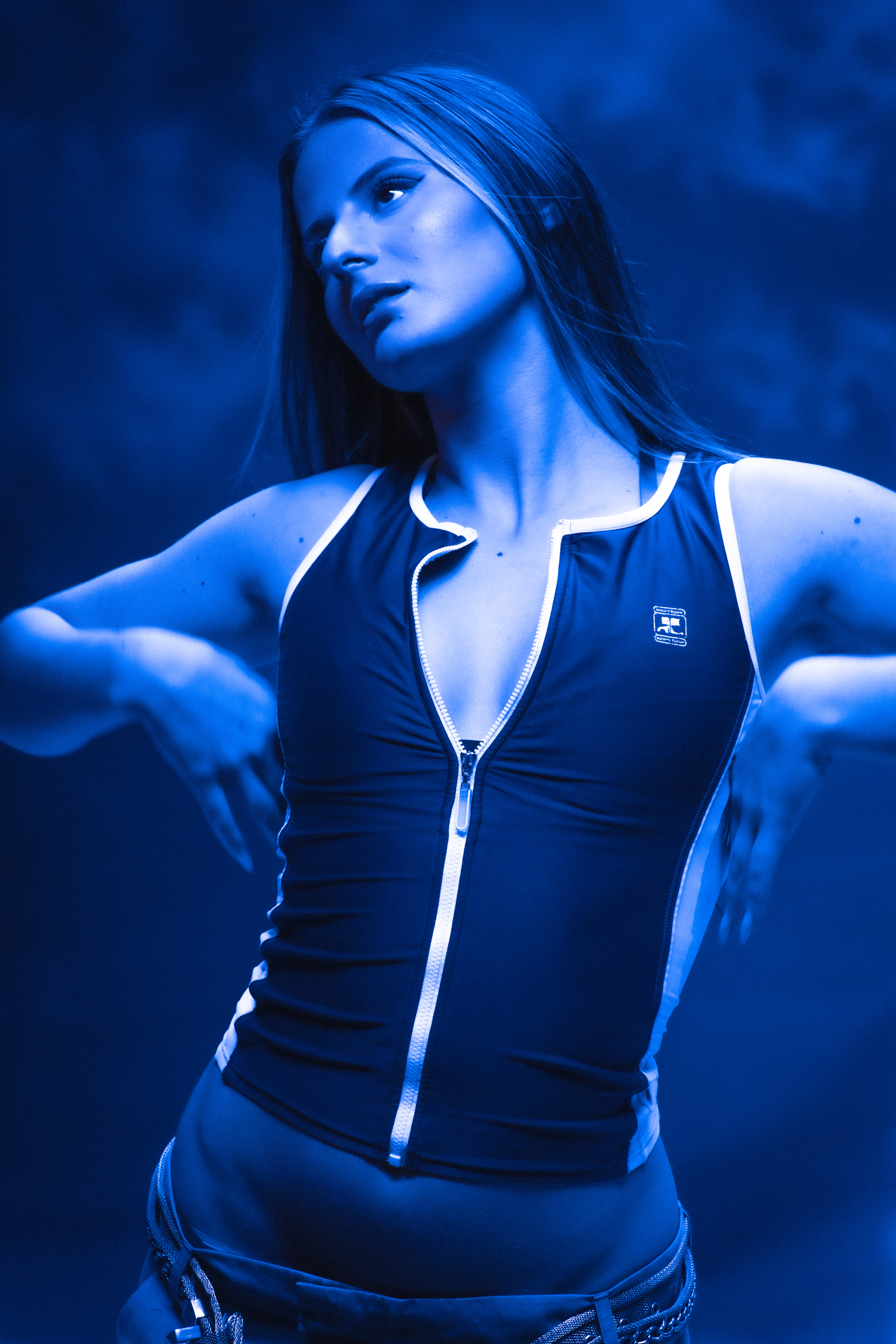
- Jane in 2025

Background information
- Born: Natalie Jane Janowski; April 25, 2004 (age 22)
- Origin: Woodcliff Lake, New Jersey, U.S.
- Genres: Pop; alt pop
- Occupation: Singer-songwriter
- Years active: 2020–present
- Label: 10K Projects/Capitol Records
- Website: www.nataliejanesings.com

Natalie Jane Janowski, (born April 25, 2004) is an American pop singer-songwriter. She is widely known for her powerful vocal riffs, massive social media following, and her 2020 run on American Idol.

== Early life and education ==
Jane was raised in Woodcliff Lake, New Jersey. She learned to play the piano and began writing songs at the age of eight, and sang in school musicals like Legally Blonde. Jane was inspired by her aunt to pursue music, who is a professional opera singer. She graduated in 2022 from Saddle River Day School.

== Career ==
=== Early career (2020–2021) ===
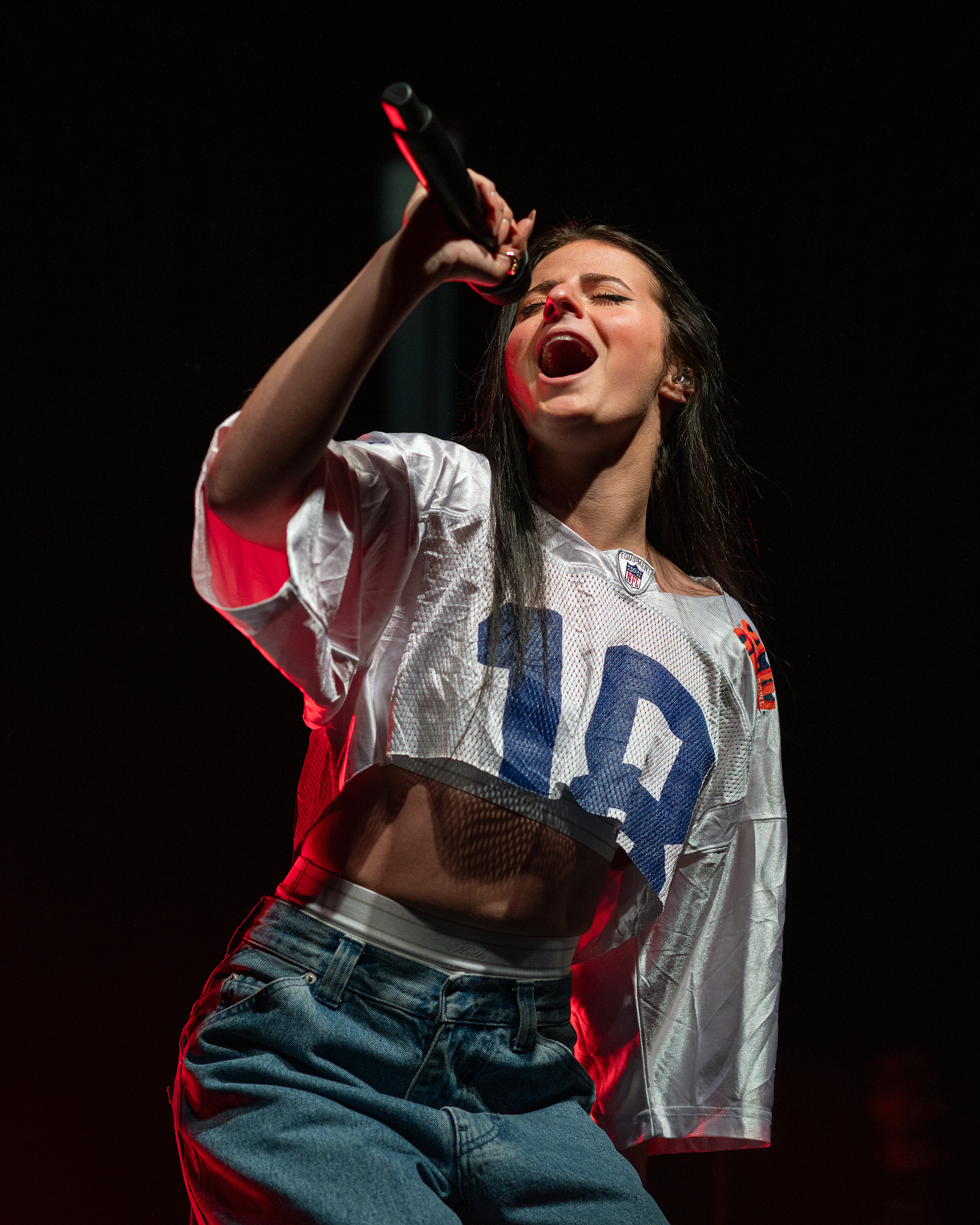
Natalie Jane in concert (El Rey, 2024)

Jane launched her professional music career while still in high school, recording her first singles in New York City through the Manhattan Showcase Project after classes. She auditioned for Season 18 of American Idol, where she made it through the first two rounds and into the Top 40. She released her debut single "In My Blood" on April 18, 2020. Over the next few months she independently released more tracks such as "Red Flag", "Bloodline", and "Kind of Love", the last of which was streamed more than seven million times on Spotify. She was accepted to the University of California at Berkeley but decided not to attend, and to pursue her professional career instead. In July 2022 she signed a deal with 10K Projects/Capitol Records and released her major-label debut, "Mentally Cheating".

=== Where Am I & Sick To My Stomach EP (2022–2025) ===
She moved to Los Angeles in September 2022, and released the singles "Seven" and "AVA", the latter co-produced by Doc Daniel, Pink Slip and Inverness. "AVA" debuted on the official singles charts in the UK, Germany, The Netherlands and Norway. Her cover of Gnarls Barkley's "Crazy", also produced by Pink Slip, came out in December 2022. At the end of the year, Distractify listed as one of its favorite TikTok trends of 2022 a "Crazy Riff Challenge" in which TikTok fans tried to "recreate the insane vocals of Natalie Jane."

In February 2023, Jane performed in Hollywood at the launch of the Whitney Houston Hotel by Whitney Houston's estate. Her single "Seeing You With Other Girls" was released in March 2023. On April 28 she released the single "I'm Her." In July 2023, she released "I'm Good", a collaboration with charlieonnafriday. On November 17, 2023, she released her debut album, Where Am I?, with four new songs and six of her earlier singles. As of November 2023, she had over 8.7 million followers on TikTok. She joined Bishop Briggs and MisterWives on tour for "Don't Look Down" in fall 2023.

Following her debut, she launched her first major headlining world tour starting in February 2024, playing dates across North America and Europe, which was sold out. Her song "The Top" was featured in the 2024 Netflix film Uglies. The Sick to My Stomach EP was released on September 27, 2024 featuring tracks such as "Somebody to Someone (I Just Wanna Fall in Love)" and "Tattoos". She also completed the "Sick To My Stomach Tour" in early 2025 with special guest Chandler Leighton. Jane's vocal performances earned her recognition on Grammy's "Rising Artists to Watch" and People's "Emerging Artists" 2024 lists.

=== The World I Didn't Want (2025–present) ===
On October 24, 2025, Jane released her sophomore studio album the world i didn't want through Capitol Records. To support her sophomore album, she embarked on her third world tour from February through May 2026. During a show in March 2026, Jane went viral after reuniting with a childhood classmate named Benji, who put gum in her hair back in the second grade, apologizing with a large bouquet of roses. On March 11, 2026, Jane released "Sabotage", followed by "Dance Til I Die" on July 31. In May 2026, she branched out into electronic dance music by providing vocals for "Meet Again", a collaboration with DJ Kaskade and Layton Giordani. In August 2026, the song reached No. 1 on the Billboard Dance Airplay chart.

== Tours ==
=== Headlining ===
- Where Am I? Tour (2024)
- Sick To My Stomach Tour (2025)
- The World I Didn't Want Tour (2026)

=== Supporting ===
- Don't Look Down Tour (2023) (with Bishop Briggs and MisterWives)

== Discography ==
=== Albums ===
Title	Album details
Where Am I?	Released: November 17, 2023; Formats: LP, digital download, streaming; Label: Capitol
The World I Didn't Want	Released: October 24, 2025; Formats: CD, LP, digital download, streaming; Label: Capitol

=== Extended plays ===
Title	Album details
Sick to My Stomach	Released: September 27, 2024; Formats: LP, digital download, streaming; Label: Capitol
Wishlist	Released: November 21, 2025; Formats: CD, LP, digital download, streaming; Label: Capitol

=== Singles ===
Title	Year	Peak chart positions					Certifications	Album
Title	Year	US Dance	CAN	GER	NZ Hot	UK	Certifications	Album
"Plastic Hearts"	2021	—	—	—	—	—		Non-album singles
"Love Is the Devil"	2021	—	—	—	—	—		Non-album singles
"Red Flag"	2021	—	—	—	—	—		Non-album singles
"Kind of Love"	2022	—	—	—	—	—		Non-album singles
"Bloodline"	2022	—	—	—	—	—		Non-album singles
"Seven"	2022	—	—	—	—	—	RIAA: Gold; MC: Gold	Where Am I?
"Mentally Cheating"	2022	—	—	—	—	—		Where Am I?
"AVA"	2022	—	—	37	—	68		Where Am I?
"Crazy"	2022	—	—	—	—	—		Non-album singles
"I'm Good" (featuring Charlieonnafriday)	2023	—	—	—	—	—		Non-album singles
"I'm Her"	2023	—	—	—	—	—		Where Am I?
"Seeing You with Other Girls"	2023	—	—	—	—	—		Where Am I?
"Do or Die"	2023	—	—	—	—	—		Where Am I?
"Intrusive Thoughts"	2023	—	—	—	—	—		Where Am I?
"Tattoos"	2024	—	—	—	—	—		Non-album singles
"Somebody to Someone (I Just Wanna Fall in Love)"	2024	—	—	—	20	—		Non-album singles
"Sick to My Stomach"	2024	—	—	—	—	—		Sick to My Stomach
"June"	2024	—	—	—	—	—		Sick to My Stomach
"Christmas Ain't Got Nothing on You"	2024	—	—	—	—	—		Non-album single
"How U Been?"	2025	—	—	—	—	—		The World I Didn't Want
"Fallin"	2025	—	—	—	—	—		The World I Didn't Want
"Girls Will B Girls"	2025	—	—	—	—	—		The World I Didn't Want
"Uh Oh!" (with Loud Luxury)	2025	—	97	—	—	—		Non-album single
"R U Gonna Love Me?"	2025	—	—	—	—	—		The World I Didn't Want
"Waiting 4 U"	2025	—	—	—	—	—		Non-album singles
"Sabotage"	2026	—	—	—	—	—		Non-album singles
"Meet Again" (with Kaskade and Layton Giordani)	2026	24	—	—	—	—		Non-album singles
"—" denotes a recording that did not chart or was not released in that territory.
