= Girlfriend (Charlie Puth song) =

2020 single by Charlie Puth

Single by Charlie Puth
- Released: June 25, 2020
- Genre: Pop
- Length: 2:57
- Label: Atlantic; Rumson
- Songwriters: Charlie Puth; Jacob Kasher Hindlin
- Producer: Charlie Puth

Charlie Puth singles chronology
"Summer Feelings" (2020)	"Girlfriend" (2020)	"Hard on Yourself" (2020)

Music video
- "Girlfriend" on YouTube

"Girlfriend" is a song by American singer-songwriter Charlie Puth. It was written by Puth and Jacob Kasher Hindlin, and produced by Puth. "Girlfriend" was announced on June 22, 2020, along with its official single artwork. Atlantic Records and Rumson Records jointly released it on June 25, 2020. Initially recorded in 2018, Puth polished the song's production for its release in 2020. It was intended to be part of Puth's third studio album; however, the album was ultimately scrapped. Lyrically, the upbeat pop song sees Puth expressing his feelings to a love interest.

"Girlfriend" peaked at number 28 on the US Billboard Digital Songs Sales and in the top 40 in Croatia and Hungary. It received positive reception from music critics, who praised its instrumentation and Puth's falsetto. Drew Kirsch directed the music video for "Girlfriend". Released on July 9, 2020, the video features Puth preparing for a dinner date at his home and dancing around the residence. In further promotion, Puth performed the song on The Late Late Show with James Corden, Today, and in several online series.

== Background and release ==
In 2018, Charlie Puth released his second studio album, Voicenotes, which included eleven songs co-written by Puth and Jacob Kasher Hindlin. Around these recording sessions, Puth and Hindlin also wrote the song "Girlfriend"; however, it remained unreleased as Puth believed it was "too ahead of its time". The song was produced by Puth, who described it as an "80s-esque Prince-y kind of electropop". It was written to impress a love interest.

Puth began to tease the song on his Twitter account in April 2020, in which he periodically posted the abbreviation "GF". Puth officially announced the song on June 22, 2020, when he posted its single artwork on his Instagram account. While the song had been created a couple years ago, Puth believed that 2020 was "a perfect time" to release it. He worked on the song's production throughout 2020, and claimed that it was "one of my favorite songs I've ever made". It was released for digital download on June 25, 2020.

== Composition and reception ==
"Girlfriend" is two minutes and 57 second long. Dmitry Gorodetsky played bass and Jan Ozveren played guitar on the song. It was produced and programmed by Puth. Chris Galland engineered it, Chris Athens mastered it, and Manny Marroquin mixed it with assistance from Jeremie Inhaber, Robin Florent, and Scott Desmarais. The song is written in the key of D-flat major and is set in time signature of common time with a tempo of 100 beats per minute. Puth's vocal range spans two octaves, from E♭_{4} to E♭_{6}.

Heran Mamo of Billboard referred to "Girlfriend" as a "swoon-worthy summer bop", praising the song's "infectious pop beat". In the United States, "Girlfriend" debuted and peaked at number 28 on the Digital Songs Sales chart for the issue dated July 11, 2020.

== Music video ==
Drew Kirsch directed the music video for "Girlfriend", which was released on July 9, 2020. Puth believed that the video allowed him to show off more personality than his previous work. He further stated that the video "meant to visually represent what I want people to do when they hear my music and that’s to have fun in their very own way".

In the music video, Puth is inside his residence preparing for a dinner date. Dressed in a floral shirt, gym socks, and loafers, Puth cleans his house and plays Twister.

== Live performances ==
On June 25, 2020, Puth performed the song on The Late Late Show with James Corden; this live version was released on digital download and streaming services five days later. He also performed it on Today on July 3, 2020. To further promote the song, Puth performed it on several online series, including Genius' Open Mic and Rolling Stones' In My Room.

== Track listings and formats ==
- Digital download / Streaming
1. "Girlfriend" – 2:57
- Digital download / Streaming
1. "Girlfriend" (Live from Corden) – 2:59
- Digital download / Streaming
1. "Girlfriend" (Haywyre Remix) – 2:38

== Credits and personnel ==
Credits adapted from Tidal.

- Charlie Puth – producer, programmer, vocals, and writer
- Nili Harary – A&R Administration
- Jeremie Inhaber – assistant mixer
- Robin Florent – assistant mixer
- Scott Desmarais – assistant mixer
- Dmitry Gorodetsky – bass
- Jan Ozveren – guitar
- Chris Athens – masterer
- Manny Marroquin – mixer
- Chris Galland – mixing engineer
- Jacob Kasher Hindlin – writer

== Charts ==
Chart performance for "Girlfriend"
Chart (2020)	Peak position
Croatia (HRT)	19
Hungary (Single Top 40)	31
Mexico Ingles Airplay (Billboard)	20
New Zealand Hot Singles (RMNZ)	24
US Digital Song Sales (Billboard)	28

== Release history ==
Release dates and formats for "Girlfriend"
Region	Date	Format	Label	Ref.
Various	June 25, 2020	Digital download; streaming	Atlantic; Rumson	
Italy	July 10, 2020	Contemporary hit radio	Warner	
United Kingdom	July 25, 2020	Adult contemporary radio	Artist Partner; Atlantic; Rumson	
