= David Brook (songwriter) =

American songwriter

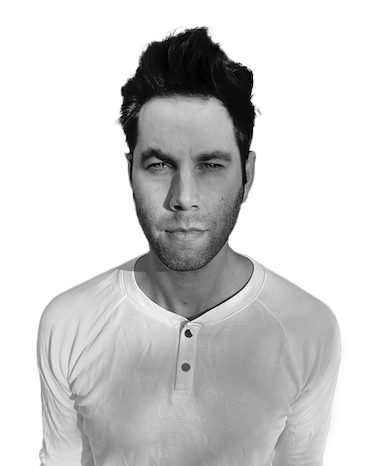

Background information
- Born: David Brook; Marblehead, Massachusetts, U.S.
- Genres: Pop; pop rock; EDM; hip hop; alternative rock
- Occupation: Songwriter

David Brook is a Grammy Award winning American songwriter from Marblehead, Massachusetts. He is best known for co-writing Eminem's Legacy, OneRepublic and Galantis's Bones", Charlie Puth's Some Type of Love, and Jason Derulo's "Broke" featuring Stevie Wonder and Keith Urban. Upon graduating Northeastern University, David moved to New York City where he was signed to Universal Music Publishing Group. He now resides in Los Angeles, California. David signed a world wide publishing deal to Ultra International Music Publishing in 2024.

== Selected songwriting discography ==
| Artist | Song | Album (label) |
|---|---|---|
| Eminem | "Legacy" | The Marshall Mathers LP2 (Interscope) |
| OneRepublic & Galantis | "Bones" | (Big Beat/Atlantic) |
| David Guetta, Galantis, & 5 Seconds Of Summer | "Lighter" | (Big Beat/Atlantic) |
| Charlie Puth | "Some Type Of Love" | Nine Track Mind (Atlantic) |
| Marshmello, Illenium, & Sacha | "Close My Eyes" | (Joytime) |
| Jason Derulo | "Broke" featuring Stevie Wonder & Keith Urban | Everything is 4 (Warner Bros.) |
| Kygo & Chelsea Cutler | "Not OK" | (RCA/Ultra) |
| Jonas Blue & Léon | "Hear Me Say" (with Léon) | (EMI) |
| Mr. Probz | ”Space for Two" | (RCA) |
| Nessa Barrett | "Forgive The World" | Young Forever (Warner) |
| John K | "Parachute" | (Epic) |
| Charlotte Lawrence | "How It Ends" | |
| Masked Wolf | "Tightrope" | Astronomical (Elektra) |
| Lukas Graham & R3hab | "Most People" | (Warner/CYB3RPVNK) |
| Alan Walker | ”Adagio" | |
| Oskar Med K feat. Izzy Bizu | ”Say No Prayer" | |
| Seventeen's Jeonghan x Wonwoo | "Beautiful Monster" | "This Man" (Pledis/Hybe) |
| Cash Cash featuring Tayler Buono | "Practice" | (Big Beat/Atlantic) |
| Jonas Blue & Sam Feldt Feat. Sam DeRosa | "Till The End" | (Positiva) |
| Jonas Blue & Rani | "Finally" | (Positiva) |
| Red Velvet | "Last Drop" | Cosmic (SM/Avex Trax) |
| Got7 | "You Calling My Name" | (JYP) |
