= Rhyme & Reason =

Rhyme & Reason may refer to:

== Film and television ==
- Rhyme & Reason (film), a 1997 documentary film about rap and hip hop
- Rhyme and Reason (game show), a 1975–1976 American game show

== Music ==
- Rhyme & Reason (Missing Persons album), 1984
- Rhyme & Reason (Ted Nash album), 1999
- Rhyme & Reason (soundtrack), from the 1997 film
- A Rhyme & Reason, an EP by Against All Will, 2009
- "Rhyme and Reason", a song by the Cat Empire from The Sun, 2002
- "Rhyme & Reason", a song by Dave Matthews Band from Under the Table and Dreaming, 1994

== See also ==
- "Rhyme nor reason", a phrase originated by Edmund Spenser
- "Rhyme or Reason", a 2013 song by Eminem
- Rhyme-as-reason effect, a cognitive bias
