= Marshall Mathers (disambiguation) =

Marshall Mathers is the real name of American rapper Eminem (born 1972).

Marshall Mathers may also refer to:

- The Marshall Mathers LP, Eminem's 2000 album, or its title track
- The Marshall Mathers LP 2, Eminem's 2013 sequel album to the above
