= Some Type of Love =

EP by Charlie Puth
- Released: May 1, 2015
- Length: 12:49
- Label: ARP; Atlantic
- Producer: Charlie Puth

Charlie Puth chronology
Ego (2013)	Some Type of Love (2015)	Nine Track Mind (2016)

Singles from Some Type of Love
- 1. "Marvin Gaye" Released: February 10, 2015

Some Type of Love is the third extended play (EP) by American singer-songwriter Charlie Puth. It was released on May 1, 2015, by Atlantic Records and Artist Partner Group. The EP produced a single, "Marvin Gaye", which featured Meghan Trainor, and was released on February 10, 2015. All tracks except for "I Won't Tell a Soul" were later included in his full-length album Nine Track Mind.

== Track listing ==
No.	Title	Writer(s)	Length
1.	"I Won't Tell a Soul"	Charlie Puth; Jacob Kasher Hindlin	3:08
2.	"Marvin Gaye" (featuring Meghan Trainor)	Puth; Julie Frost; Jacob Luttrell; Nick Seeley	3:07
3.	"Some Type of Love"	Puth; David Brook	3:05
4.	"Suffer"	Puth; Breyan Isaac	3:30
Total length:			12:49

== Charts ==
Chart (2015)	Peak position
Danish Albums (Hitlisten)	40
US Billboard 200	37
Top Heatseekers Albums (Billboard)	3
