= Nine Track Mind =

2016 studio album by Charlie Puth

- Standard edition cover

Studio album by Charlie Puth
- Released: January 29, 2016
- Recorded: 2014–2015
- Genres: Pop; R&B
- Length: 41:04
- Labels: Artist Partner; Atlantic; Otto
- Producers: DJ Frank E; Matt Prime; J.R. Rotem; Infamous; Charlie Puth; Breyan Isaac; Jesse Shatkin; Geoffro Cause; Johan Carlsson; Red Triangle

Charlie Puth chronology
Some Type of Love (2015)	Nine Track Mind (2016)	Voicenotes (2018)

Singles from Nine Track Mind
- 1. "One Call Away" Released: August 20, 2015; 2. "We Don't Talk Anymore" Released: May 24, 2016; 3. "Dangerously" Released: December 2, 2016

Nine Track Mind is the debut studio album by American singer-songwriter Charlie Puth. It was released on January 29, 2016, by Artist Partner Group and Atlantic Records.

The album's lead single, "Marvin Gaye", which features Meghan Trainor, was originally released as Some Type of Love's only single on February 10, 2015, and peaked at number 21 on the Billboard Hot 100, while topping the charts in various countries including France, Ireland, New Zealand, and the United Kingdom. The album's second single, "One Call Away", was released on August 20, 2015, reaching number 12 on the Billboard Hot 100. On May 24, 2016, Puth released the third single "We Don't Talk Anymore", featuring Selena Gomez, with it having peaked at number 9 on the Billboard Hot 100. A music video for "Dangerously" was released on November 2, 2016.

Upon release, Nine Track Mind was a commercial success, debuting and peaking at number 6 on the Billboard 200 with 65,000 units. The album received negative reviews from critics, who criticized the simplistic production, overt focus on love ballads, and Puth's vocal performance. Puth himself has confessed that he was disappointed at how the album turned out.

== Background ==
Puth first became known in 2011 for his YouTube cover of Adele's "Someone Like You", which resulted in two guest appearances on The Ellen DeGeneres Show, and him signing to eleveneleven, a record label founded by Ellen DeGeneres. In 2014 and 2015, Puth was working with Wiz Khalifa on "See You Again", written for the film Furious 7 which opened in April 2015. Puth also invited Meghan Trainor to sing on his song "Marvin Gaye", released in February 2015. "Marvin Gaye" would return as the lead single of Nine Track Mind.

== Release ==
The finalized track listing was revealed on December 11, 2015. The final track listing removed the tracks "Know Your Name" and "Hard" and replaced them with "Dangerously" and "We Don't Talk Anymore". "I Won't Tell a Soul" was also due for inclusion on the Japanese edition, but was subsequently removed. Puth embarked on his Nine Track Mind Tour in March 2016. A deluxe edition, containing three new songs, was released on November 11, 2016.

== Singles and videos ==
"Marvin Gaye", which features American singer-songwriter Meghan Trainor, was released on February 10, 2015, as the first single from the album. "One Call Away" was announced by Puth as the second single from the album on August 4, 2015, and was released along with the pre-order of the album on August 20, 2015. On May 11, 2016, Puth announced "We Don't Talk Anymore" as the third single from the album. Selena Gomez provides vocals for the song. It impacted US contemporary hit radio on May 24, 2016. "Dangerously" was sent to Italian radios as the fourth and final single from the album on December 2, 2016. A music video for the song was released on November 2, 2016.

A music video was released on February 19, 2016, to the remix version of "Suffer", directed by Austin Starrett Winchell.

== Critical reception ==
Professional ratings
Aggregate scores
Source	Rating
Metacritic	37/100
Review scores
Source	Rating
AllMusic	2/5 stars
Entertainment Weekly	C+
The Guardian	3/5 stars
Idolator	3/5 stars
Newsday	B−
The Observer	2/5 stars
Pitchfork	2.5/10
Q	1/5 stars
Spin	3/10
Toronto Sun	2.5/5

Nine Track Mind received negative reviews from music critics, who were critical of the album's writing, production, and Puth's overall performance. On Metacritic, which assigns a rating out of 100 based on reviews from mainstream critics, the album gained an average score of 37, based on seven reviews, indicating "generally unfavorable reviews," making it the 15th-lowest critic-reviewed album on the site.

The Guardian's Rachel Aroesti gave Nine Track Mind three out of five stars, saying, "the standard of his songwriting is consistently high, and his central theme—romantic obsession that verges on the masochistic—makes for a record that softly burns." In a negative review for Pitchfork, Jia Tolentino—recognizing Puth's talent and "considerable abilities"—criticized the album for sounding juvenile, and wrote that "the album's emotional range covers the spectrum from light longing to light infatuation, contributing to the overall sense that Nine Track Mind is aimed exclusively at hairlessness: children, prepubescents, the discomfitingly waxed." Spin wrote that "The most standout feature of Nine Track Mind might be its rhythmic consistency, an exercise in deceleration. ... inoffensive dross". AllMusic criticized the singer's performances and the album's production, stating that "Puth's problem is that he feels stage-managed; you can sense him hitting his marks. This isn't merely a problem in the performance. Such fussiness extends to his compositions, which seem to mimic the idea of genuine emotions instead of delivering them, something that would be infuriating if Puth didn't just disappear into his immaculate surroundings, a fading ghost on his own album".

== Track listing ==
Nine Track Mind – North American edition
No.	Title	Writer(s)	Producer(s)	Length
1.	"One Call Away"	Charlie Puth; Justin Franks; Matt Prime; Maureen Anne McDonald; Shy Carter; Breyan Isaac	DJ Frank E; Prime	3:14
2.	"Dangerously"	Puth; J.R. Rotem; Alexander Izquierdo; James Abrahart	J.R. Rotem; Infamous; Puth^{[a]}	3:19
3.	"Marvin Gaye" (featuring Meghan Trainor)	Puth; Julie Frost; Jacob Luttrell; Nick Seeley	Puth	3:10
4.	"Losing My Mind"	Puth; Isaac; Ruby Pickens Tartt; Vera Hall	Puth; Isaac^{[a]}	3:32
5.	"We Don't Talk Anymore" (featuring Selena Gomez)	Puth; Jacob Kasher Hindlin; Selena Gomez	Puth	3:37
6.	"My Gospel"	Puth; Josh Kear	Puth	3:30
7.	"Up All Night"	Puth; Bonnie McKee; Giorgio Tuinfort; Thomas Troelsen	Jesse Shatkin; Prime^{[b]}	3:10
8.	"Left Right Left"	Puth; Franks; Geoffrey Earley; Marc Griffin; Paris Jones	DJ Frank E; Geoffro Cause	3:26
9.	"Then There's You"	Puth; Johan Carlsson; Ross Golan	Carlsson; Puth^{[a]}	3:34
10.	"Suffer"	Puth; Isaac	Puth	3:30
11.	"As You Are" (featuring Shy Carter)	Puth; Rick Parkhouse; George Tizzard; Carter; Jack Martello	Red Triangle	3:55
12.	"Some Type of Love"	Puth; David Brook	Puth	3:07
Total length:				41:04

Nine Track Mind – North American deluxe edition (bonus tracks)
No.	Title	Writer(s)	Producer(s)	Length
13.	"River"	Puth; Priscilla Renea	Puth	3:11
14.	"Does It Feel"	Puth; Danny Schofield; Hindlin		3:38
15.	"Nothing but Trouble (Instagram Models)" (Dance Remix)	Puth; Dwayne Michael Carter; Will Lobban-Bean	Puth	4:46
Total length:				52:39

Nine Track Mind – LP and international edition (bonus track)
No.	Title	Writer(s)	Producer(s)	Length
13.	"See You Again" (Wiz Khalifa featuring Charlie Puth)	Puth; Franks; Andrew Cedar; Cameron Jibril Thomaz	Puth; DJ Frank E; Andrew Cedar	3:49
Total length:				44:53

Nine Track Mind – International deluxe edition (bonus tracks)
No.	Title	Writer(s)	Producer(s)	Length
14.	"River"	Puth; Renea	Puth	3:11
15.	"Does It Feel"	Puth; Schofield; Hindlin		3:38
16.	"Nothing but Trouble (Instagram Models)" (Dance Remix)	Puth; Carter; Lobban-Bean	Puth	4:46
Total length:				59:39

Nine Track Mind – Korean special edition (bonus tracks)
No.	Title	Length
14.	"Suffer" (Vince Staples and AndreaLo Remix)	4:02
15.	"One Call Away" (Acoustic)	3:09
16.	"One Call Away" (Piano-pella)	2:23
Total length:		54:27

Nine Track Mind – Japanese edition (bonus tracks)
No.	Title	Length
14.	"Marvin Gaye" (featuring Wale)	3:20
15.	"Marvin Gaye" (featuring Meghan Trainor) (Bohem Remix)	3:14
16.	"One Call Away" (featuring Tyga) (Remix)	3:12
17.	"One Call Away" (KLYMVX Remix)	3:41
Total length:		58:20

Nine Track Mind – Japan Tour Edition and 2024 worldwide digital special edition (bonus tracks)
No.	Title	Length
18.	"One Call Away" (Acoustic)	3:09
19.	"Marvin Gaye" (Live)	3:14
20.	"Some Type of Love" (Live)	3:18
Total length:		68:01

Notes

- ^{^a} signifies a co-producer
- ^{^b} signifies an additional producer
- "Losing My Mind" contains elements of Vera Hall's song "Wild Ox Moan"

== Personnel ==
Musicians

- Charlie Puth – lead vocals, programming (all tracks); background vocals (9)
- Luke Potashnick – drums, guitar (1)
- Joseph Kupiers – cello (2)
- Juan Chaves – conductor (2)
- Nick Seeley – strings (2)
- Emily Williams – viola (2)
- Mark Landson – viola, violin (2)
- Elizabeth Elsner – violin (2)
- Miika Gregg – violin (2)
- Veronica Gan – violin (2)
- Kaveh Rastegar – bass guitar (3)
- Asaf Rodeh – guitar (5)
- Jesse Shatkin – bass guitar, drum programming, synthesizer (7)
- Franck Van der Heijden – conductor, orchestra arrangement (7)
- Giorgio Tuinfort – orchestra arrangement (7)
- Riciotti Ensemble (Note: The Riciotti Ensemble includes Bram Faber, David Faber, Diewertje Wanders, Floorje Beljon, Ian de Jong, Jozien Jansen, Judith van Driel, Kasper Stern, Loes Dooren, Lotte de Vries, Mark Mulder, Marleen Wester, Sofie van der Pol, Stijn Brinkman, and Tseroeja van den Bos.) – orchestra (7)
- Johan Carlsson – acoustic guitar, background vocals, guitar, piano, programming, synthesizer, tambourine (9)
- Ross Golan – background vocals (9)
- David Bukovinszky – cello (9)
- Mattias Bylund – strings (9)
- Mattias Johansson – violin (9)
- George Tizzard – additional vocals, drums, keyboards (11)
- Rick Parkhouse – additional vocals, programming (11)
- Jack Martello – background vocals (11)

Technical

- Dave Kutch – mastering
- Manny Marroquin – mixing
- Charlie Puth – recording (1, 2, 4–6, 8, 10, 12), additional engineering (7)
- DJ Frank E – recording (1)
- Matt Prime – recording (1)
- Ryan Gladieux – recording (3), additional engineering (8)
- Paul Pauwer – recording (7)
- Alex HeMe Toval – recording (11)
- Rick Parkhouse – recording (11)
- Samuel Kalanjjian – engineering (2)
- Cory Bice – engineering (9)
- Sam Holland – engineering (9)
- Marcus van Wattum – editing (7)
- Chris Galland – mixing assistance
- Ike Schultz – mixing assistance
- Jaime Wosk – additional engineering (7)
- Mattias Bylund – additional engineering (9)

== Charts ==
=== Weekly charts ===
Weekly chart performance for Nine Track Mind
Chart (2016–2023)	Peak position
Australian Albums (ARIA)	8
Austrian Albums (Ö3 Austria)	17
Belgian Albums (Ultratop Flanders)	17
Belgian Albums (Ultratop Wallonia)	17
Canadian Albums (Billboard)	5
Czech Albums (ČNS IFPI)	33
Danish Albums (Hitlisten)	6
Dutch Albums (Album Top 100)	13
Finnish Albums (Suomen virallinen lista)	38
French Albums (SNEP)	5
German Albums (Offizielle Top 100)	36
Hungarian Albums (MAHASZ)	18
Irish Albums (IRMA)	18
Italian Albums (FIMI)	21
Japanese Albums (Oricon)	17
New Zealand Albums (RMNZ)	2
Norwegian Albums (VG-lista)	16
Polish Albums (ZPAV)	24
Scottish Albums (Official Charts)	6
Slovak Albums (ČNS IFPI)	94
South African Albums (RISA)	7
South Korean Albums (Gaon)	33
South Korean Albums International (Gaon)	3
Spanish Albums (Promusicae)	21
Swedish Albums (Sverigetopplistan)	24
Swiss Albums (Schweizer Hitparade)	10
UK Albums (Official Charts)	6
US Billboard 200	6

=== Year-end charts ===
2016 year-end chart performance for Nine Track Mind
Chart (2016)	Position
Australian Albums (ARIA)	55
Belgian Albums (Ultratop Flanders)	148
Belgian Albums (Ultratop Wallonia)	138
Canadian Albums (Billboard)	33
Danish Albums (Hitlisten)	16
Dutch Albums (MegaCharts)	95
French Albums (SNEP)	44
New Zealand Albums (RMNZ)	10
South Korean Albums International (Gaon)	11
Swedish Albums (Sverigetopplistan)	45
Swiss Albums (Schweizer Hitparade)	64
UK Albums (OCC)	39
US Billboard 200	43

2017 chart performance for Nine Track Mind
Chart (2017)	Position
Danish Albums (Hitlisten)	61
New Zealand Albums (RMNZ)	38
Swedish Albums (Sverigetopplistan)	74

== Certifications ==
Certifications and sales for Nine Track Mind
Region	Certification	Certified units/sales
Canada (Music Canada)	2× Platinum	160,000^{‡}
Denmark (IFPI Danmark)	2× Platinum	40,000^{‡}
France (SNEP)	Platinum	100,000^{‡}
Italy (FIMI)	Gold	25,000^{‡}
Netherlands (NVPI)	Gold	20,000^{‡}
New Zealand (RMNZ)	3× Platinum	45,000^{‡}
Singapore (RIAS)	3× Platinum	30,000^{*}
Sweden (GLF)	Gold	20,000^{‡}
United Kingdom (BPI)	Platinum	222,610
United States (RIAA)	2× Platinum	2,000,000^{‡}
^{*} Sales figures based on certification alone.^{‡} Sales+streaming figures based on certification alone.

== Release history ==
Release dates for Nine Track Mind
Region	Date	Label	Format	Version
Worldwide	January 29, 2016	Atlantic	CD; digital download	Standard
Worldwide	November 11, 2016	Atlantic	CD; digital download	Deluxe
