= One Call Away (Charlie Puth song) =

Single by Charlie Puth

from the album Nine Track Mind
- Released: August 20, 2015
- Recorded: 2015
- Genre: Pop, soul
- Length: 3:12
- Label: Atlantic
- Songwriters: Charlie Puth; Justin Franks; Matt Prime; Shy Carter; Maureen McDonald; Breyan Isaac
- Producers: DJ Frank E; Prime

Charlie Puth singles chronology
"See You Again" (2015)	"One Call Away" (2015)	"We Don't Talk Anymore" (2016)

Music video
- "One Call Away" on YouTube

"One Call Away" is a song by American singer-songwriter Charlie Puth. It was released on August 20, 2015, by Atlantic Records as the second single from his debut studio album, Nine Track Mind (2016). "One Call Away" is a gospel-infused pop-soul song. It reached number 12 on the Billboard Hot 100, making it Puth's third top 40 single in the US and his third highest-charting single as a lead artist to date, behind "We Don't Talk Anymore" and "Attention".

== Background ==
According to Puth, the song came about during a songwriting camp that his record label set up. Puth was paired with a team and they failed to come up with a song in a week, disappointing the label, until DJ Frank E, who had previously worked with Puth on "See You Again", introduced him to "One Call Away" as a song idea. Puth stated that he "absolutely" needed to sing the song, despite having not written the chorus, and that he wrote the song's bridge in addition to "a couple of lines".

Puth told iHeart: ‘One Call Away’ is about anyone who is in love, and can't see that person everyday. The song grew to popularity, and it became a part of e-cards that people used to send over email. They are more commonly used as memes now. This musical meme specifically meant for when one has not seen a person that they love in a long time.

== Chart performance ==
In the United States, "One Call Away" debuted at number 89, in the week ending December 19, 2015. In the UK, the song debuted at number 73, in the week ending December 3, 2015. The song was certified double Platinum by the RIAA on July 28, 2016, and 4× Platinum on March 19, 2019. As of July 2017, the song has sold 1,575,000 copies domestically.

In New Zealand, the song debuted at number 39, in the week ending October 12, 2015; the next week, it jumped from 39 to 9, becoming his third hit top ten in New Zealand. It reached its peak, number 3, the following week.

== Music video ==
Directed by Mark Staubach, the music video for "One Call Away" was released on September 14, 2015, by his own YouTube channel.

It begins with Puth playing Rachmaninoff's "Morceaux de fantaisie, Op. 3, Prelude No. 2 in C-sharp minor" on a grand piano in a college music classroom, before he is interrupted by a girl (played by Ellie Hahn) who comes into the room to watch, before she puts on headphones, and the actual song begins. It then cuts to clips of him walking to and sitting down in class. He nudges his friend (played by Stephen Puth, his younger brother) as he sees the girl sit down behind him, still wearing her headphones. He looks back at her and she smiles, but her boyfriend then sits down next to her, which Puth sees, and then sinks down into his chair.

Puth and a couple of classmates are shown sitting in a gymnasium, while looking at her status updates on a Facebook-like website. He is then shown walking down a bookstore, while she is reading on the other side; he gets to the end of the aisle and they see each other, but she walks away dismissively. Shots of a film being cut and hung up are shown. She is then shown practicing a ballet on stage with Puth accompanying on grand piano. Her boyfriend comes, they get in a fight, and she leaves, sitting down outside and covering her face with her hands, to cry.

Longer shots of the film editing are shown. The girl is shown going to the Palace Theater in Los Angeles; as she sits down Puth sees her from the projection booth. He loads the projector with the film he has made and starts it. Clips from classic films are shown on the screen, beginning with characters in peril and then being saved (matching the lyrics), and ending in a romantic scene. The clips of the characters being saved causes her to look up at the booth, where he smiles down at her and she smiles back.

The music video has over 843 million views as of September 2024.

== Remix ==
The official remix features a guest verse from American rapper Tyga. There is another remix entitled "One Call Away (Coast to Coast Mix)" that features a four-person duet with Charlie, Sofia Reyes, Brett Eldredge and Ty Dolla Sign.

== Charts ==
=== Weekly charts ===
Weekly chart performance for "One Call Away"
Chart (2015–16)	Peak position
Australia (ARIA)	3
Austria (Ö3 Austria Top 40)	8
Belgium (Ultratop 50 Flanders)	12
Belgium (Ultratop 50 Wallonia)	23
Canada Hot 100 (Billboard)	15
Czech Republic Singles Digital (ČNS IFPI)	27
Denmark (Tracklisten)	13
Ecuador (National-Report)	86
Finland Airplay (Radiosoittolista)	36
France (SNEP)	36
Germany (GfK)	30
Hungary (Single Top 40)	40
Hungary (Stream Top 40)	36
Ireland (IRMA)	53
Italy (FIMI)	39
Japan Hot 100 (Billboard)	62
Lebanon (Lebanese Top 20)	4
Mexico Ingles Airplay (Billboard)	12
Netherlands (Dutch Top 40)	23
Netherlands (Single Top 100)	24
New Zealand (Recorded Music NZ)	3
Norway (VG-lista)	36
Poland Airplay (ZPAV)	3
Portugal (AFP)	26
Slovakia Airplay (ČNS IFPI)	1
Slovakia Singles Digital (ČNS IFPI)	4
Slovenia (SloTop50)	7
South Africa Airplay (EMA)	5
South Korea (Gaon)	59
Spain (Promusicae)	59
Sweden (Sverigetopplistan)	21
Switzerland (Schweizer Hitparade)	10
UK Singles (Official Charts)	26
US Billboard Hot 100	12
US Adult Contemporary (Billboard)	3
US Adult Pop Airplay (Billboard)	1
US Pop Airplay (Billboard)	11
US Rhythmic Airplay (Billboard)	38

=== Year-end charts ===
2016 year-end chart performance for "One Call Away"
Chart (2016)	Position
Australia (ARIA)	14
Belgium (Ultratop Flanders)	60
Belgium (Ultratop Wallonia)	55
Canada (Canadian Hot 100)	56
Denmark (Tracklisten)	45
France (SNEP)	148
Netherlands (Single Top 100)	67
Poland (ZPAV)	45
Slovenia (SloTop50)	23
Switzerland (Schweizer Hitparade)	43
UK Singles (Official Charts Company)	78
US Billboard Hot 100	43
US Adult Contemporary (Billboard)	5
US Adult Top 40 (Billboard)	12
US Mainstream Top 40 (Billboard)	44

2017 year-end chart performance for "One Call Away"
Chart (2017)	Position
US Adult Contemporary (Billboard)	23

2023 year-end chart performance for "One Call Away"
Chart (2023)	Position
South Korea (Circle)	161

== Certifications ==
Certifications and sales for "One Call Away"
Region	Certification	Certified units/sales
Australia (ARIA)	7× Platinum	490,000^{‡}
Belgium (BRMA)	Gold	10,000^{‡}
Canada (Music Canada)	4× Platinum	320,000^{‡}
Denmark (IFPI Danmark)	3× Platinum	270,000^{‡}
Germany (BVMI)	Gold	200,000^{‡}
Italy (FIMI)	Platinum	50,000^{‡}
New Zealand (RMNZ)	4× Platinum	120,000^{‡}
Norway (IFPI Norway)	2× Platinum	120,000^{‡}
Poland (ZPAV)	Platinum	20,000^{‡}
Portugal (AFP)	Platinum	10,000^{‡}
South Korea	—	2,500,000
Spain (Promusicae)	Gold	30,000^{‡}
Sweden (GLF)	2× Platinum	80,000^{‡}
Switzerland (IFPI Switzerland)	Gold	15,000^{‡}
United Kingdom (BPI)	Platinum	600,000^{‡}
United States (RIAA)	4× Platinum	4,000,000^{‡}
Streaming
Japan (RIAJ)	Gold	50,000,000^{†}
^{‡} Sales+streaming figures based on certification alone.^{†} Streaming-only figures based on certification alone.
