= Legacy (Eminem song) =

Song by Eminem

from the album The Marshall Mathers LP 2
- Released: November 5, 2013
- Recorded: 2012
- Studio: Effigy Studios (Ferndale, Michigan)
- Genre: Hip hop
- Length: 4:56
- Label: Shady; Aftermath; Interscope
- Songwriters: Marshall Mathers; Polina Goudieva; David Brook; Emile Haynie
- Producer: Emile

"Legacy" is a song by American rapper Eminem. It is the sixth track on his eighth studio album The Marshall Mathers LP 2 (2013). The song discusses Eminem's dysfunctional childhood. The song was produced by American record producer Emile Haynie and written by Eminem, Polina Goudieva, David Brook, and Emile Haynie. The song features additional vocals from Russian singer-songwriter Polina. "Legacy" was met with generally positive reviews from music critics upon the album's release. The song has since peaked at number 44 on the US Billboard Hot R&B/Hip-Hop Songs. "Legacy" became one of the official theme songs of WrestleMania XXX.

== Background and theme ==
The song primarily discusses Eminem's dysfunctional childhood upbringing in Detroit, Michigan. The theme of "Legacy" mirrors "Lose Yourself" in explaining how important music was in directing the young Eminem's life. He cites Queens' hardcore hip hop group Onyx as an example of what he would listen to at the time. The song recounts how shy and awkward Eminem was as a child, even being shoved into a locker in school, and then details how he gained self-esteem and hope through rap. In the end, he discovers rapping is his legacy and that having his brain "wired differently" was worth it.

Eminem has stated that he intended for the song to be "self-empowerment" for those whom nobody believed in. The song contains numerous football references, including Brian Dawkins, Detroit Lions, New York Giants, Atlanta Falcons, Miami Dolphins, the Body Bag Game, Dick Butkus, and Brian Baldinger. Most notably, he mentions the Detroit Lions' 0–16 2008 season. Onyx's Fredro Starr praised Eminem for mentioning the group. He also pointed out that it connected the two Marshall Mathers LPs, as Onyx's Sticky Fingaz was featured on The Marshall Mathers LP on the song "Remember Me?".

== Composition ==
The start of "Legacy" was written during a session between singer-songwriter Polina and songwriter David Brook in New York City. A few months later, Polina visited Interscope executive Neil Jacobson, who, upon hearing the song, commanded her: "Don't play this for anyone. It's an Eminem record." The following week, Polina, and Brook joined Emile in the studio where he produced the song and then sent it to Eminem. Eminem wrote the rapped verses to the song, but left Polina's vocals untouched. The song's production and overall tone earned comparisons to Eminem's hit song "Stan". The rhyming words used in the song remain unchanged, as Eminem wanted to challenge himself.

== Critical reception ==
"Legacy" was met with generally positive reviews from music critics. Andy Gill of The Independent highlighted "Legacy" as one of the album's best songs. Greg Kot writing for the Chicago Tribune said, " "Legacy" reprises the formula for The Marshall Mathers LP-era hit "Stan" with introspective rhymes tied to a female vocal hook." Gabriel Alvarez of Complex stated, "'Legacy' is a unique entry in Eminem's catalog because it shows an emotional growth that Eminem didn't always seem capable of. He shoveled shit his entire life and often seemed unable to forgive his mother, his detractors, and ultimately himself for everything he had been through. Yet on "Legacy" he finally finds Eminem able to appreciate his great gift, even if it came at a great expense." Roman Cooper of HipHopDX credited "Legacy" for doing "a great job of carrying Em's wicked rhymes." Ryan Bassil of Vice said, "Legacy" was, the perfect summation of an album that is both self-aware and introspective, but still brash and cleverly comedic." Melinda Newman of HitFix gave the song a B− rating and said, "It’s as close as Eminem gets to a self-empowerment song."

Josh Weiner of The Tufts Daily stated, "Always renowned for his storytelling gifts, Eminem shows audiences what he’s made of with tracks like the introspective "Legacy". Matt Shinseki of Campus Times said, "Songs such as "Stronger Than I Was" and "Legacy" are unexpectedly profound reflections on how far Eminem has come from his troubled childhood in 8 Mile, Michigan. The lyrics in these tracks are reminiscent of some of his earliest work and are comforting for long-time fans that worry that Eminem may forget his roots." Jay Soul of RapReviews said, "Nobody can place himself within the psyche of bullied school kids like Marshall Mathers III, and "Legacy" provides a highlight - almost like the audio version of the "No Love" video." Stephen Deusner of Paste stated, ""Legacy" seems like the most baffling anti-bullying anthem imaginable, at least until you realize it's about how you shouldn't bully Eminem."

Christopher R. Weingarten of Spin compared "Legacy" to Eminem's previous more pop oriented album Recovery and deemed it skippable. Mike Diver of Clash stated, "His ear for a great melody underpinning caustic wordplay remains in flashes, but it’s consistently overwhelmed by too many formulaic arrangements leaning on hooks from female vocalists. "Legacy" is a rudimentary rant balanced by a sweet contribution from Polina." Craig Jenkins of Pitchfork Media said, ""Legacy" pulls all manner of cockamamie pronunciation gymnastics just so Eminem can end every line with the same rhyming syllables, and the song's decision to dispense with proper word accents and splay sentences haphazardly across the middle of lines makes for a flow that comes across overwrought and labored even as it plays Frankenstein with conventional word choice and rhyme patterns."

== Chart performance ==
Chart (2013)	Peak position
France (SNEP)	163
UK Singles (The Official Charts Company)	199
UK Hip Hop/R&B (Official Charts)	24
US Bubbling Under Hot 100 (Billboard)	18
US Hot R&B/Hip-Hop Songs (Billboard)	44

== Certifications ==
Region	Certification	Certified units/sales
Australia (ARIA)	Gold	35,000^{‡}
New Zealand (RMNZ)	Gold	15,000^{‡}
United Kingdom (BPI)	Silver	200,000^{‡}
United States (RIAA)	Gold	500,000^{‡}
^{‡} Sales+streaming figures based on certification alone.
