= Marvin Gaye (song) =

2015 single by Charlie Puth featuring Meghan Trainor

Single by Charlie Puth featuring Meghan Trainor

from the EP Some Type of Love and Nine Track Mind
- Released: February 10, 2015
- Genre: Doo-wop; soul; pop
- Length: 3:10
- Label: Artist Partner; Atlantic
- Songwriters: Charlie Puth; Julie Frost; Jacob Luttrell; Nick Seeley
- Producer: Charlie Puth

Charlie Puth singles chronology
"Marvin Gaye" (2015)	"See You Again" (2015)

Meghan Trainor singles chronology
"Lips Are Movin" (2014)	"Marvin Gaye" (2015)	"Dear Future Husband" (2015)

Music video
- "Marvin Gaye" on YouTube

"Marvin Gaye" is the debut single by American singer-songwriter Charlie Puth featuring Meghan Trainor, from his third EP, Some Type of Love (2015). It later served as the lead single for his debut studio album, Nine Track Mind (2016). Puth co-wrote it, with Julie Frost, Jacob Luttrell and Nick Seeley, and produced it. Artist Partner Group released it as a single on February 10, 2015. The doo-wop and soul song is named after singer Marvin Gaye, whose name is used as a verb in the lyrics. Charlie added to the songwriting credited because the song interpolates American rock band Van Halen's song "Can't Stop Lovin' You" (1995).

"Marvin Gaye" received negative reviews from music critics, who were critical of its titular line but some appreciated Trainor's appearance. "Marvin Gaye" topped charts in France, Ireland, Israel, New Zealand, Scotland, and the United Kingdom while reaching the top 10 in Australia, Austria, Belgium, Iceland, Italy, Slovenia, and Spain. Marc Klasfeld directed its music video, which was released on April 1, 2015. "Marvin Gaye" has been performed on The Today Show and at the 2015 American Music Awards. Both the music video and latter performance end with the duo kissing. The song appears on the set list for Trainor's MTrain Tour (2015) and Puth's Voicenotes Tour (2018).

== Background and release ==
Charlie Puth began his music career on YouTube and later signed with Ellen DeGeneres' record label eleveneleven. He wrote "Marvin Gaye" with Julie Frost, Jacob Luttrell and Nick Seeley, and came up with its drum beat by "tapping [his] foot and clapping along" while sitting at a cafe in Cahuenga Boulevard. Puth then ended up meeting Meghan Trainor at a party, where the two exchanged music. Upon hearing the song, Trainor thought it should be a duet and asked to sing on it. Puth recalled that she knew the whole song in a day, and they recorded it in one take. The duo announced the collaboration in a January 2015 YouTube video, where Trainor said that it is "amazing" and noted that it would be her first release she did not write. The track led to Puth appearing in Trainor's music video for her single "Dear Future Husband", and later serving as an opening act on her second headlining concert tour MTrain Tour (2015).

Artist Partner Group released "Marvin Gaye" as the lead single from Puth's third EP, Some Type of Love (2015), on February 10, 2015. Warner Music Group serviced the song to contemporary hit radio in Italy on July 10, 2015, and Artist Partner the United Kingdom on July 20. A Remix EP to promote it was released on August 28, 2015, featuring remixes of it by DJ Kue, Cahill, Boehm and 10K Islands. Atlantic Records released a CD single for "Marvin Gaye" on September 18, 2015, with an alternate version of it by Puth featuring Wale as its B-side. The song was also included on Puth's debut studio album, Nine Track Mind (2016), and the Wale version and Boehm remix appeared on a Japanese edition of it.

== Composition ==
"Marvin Gaye"
An 18-second sample of "Marvin Gaye", the song was Puth's attempt to contemporize "what Motown soul would sound like in 2015".

"Marvin Gaye" draws inspiration from Motown and has a retro sound reminiscent of Trainor's debut major-label studio album, Title (2015). The doo-wop song includes lyrical references to several soul classics, and uses soul singer Marvin Gaye's name as a lyric and titular verb. It has a "bass-booming" breakdown during Trainor's verse, and its modernized throwback soul sound drew comparisons to her song "All About That Bass" (2014). Puth described the breakdown as "this trap thing with this hard-ass distorted 808", which was his attempt to contemporize "what Motown soul would sound like in 2015". Pitchfork's Jia Tolentino commented that "Marvin Gaye" proves that Puth "lives for retro flourishes: doo-wop rhythms, sock-hop melodies, finger snaps [and] arpeggiated singalong piano".

Puth described "Marvin Gaye" as "a musical icebreaker" that he wrote to help "any guy who wants to go up to a girl at a bar", noting that it would be hard to "not have a conversation" about the song if it came on the radio. He named Gaye as an influence on the song's lyrics which he wrote to evoke a "feeling that would reach everybody", and further elaborated that:

Since I'm kind of a shy person, I can't just walk up to girls and be like, "Yo, let me get your number!" That's where the song comes in as a musical icebreaker. If you hear it on the radio or at a bar, it's a way to say, "Hey! Let's Marvin Gaye and get it on".

== Critical reception ==
"Marvin Gaye" received generally negative reviews from music critics. Idolator's Ryan Carey-Mahoney stated that it is "more mood-killer than hot and heavy" and "a big hit that never really deserved to be". The same website's Mike Wass described the song as a "smooth anthem tune" with a "catchy" chorus, and called it a "natural fit" for Trainor. Elias Leight of Billboard gave it a rating of two out of five stars, and wrote that though Trainor "lends Puth some of her doo-wop swagger", it "seems more academic exercise than an attempt at seduction". Writing for Stereogum, Chris DeVille stated that the lyric "Let's Marvin Gaye and get it on" instantly "disqualifies ['Marvin Gaye'] from praise" and the gimmick is "too egregious and in-your-face" to appreciate the smart composition, but called it "musically sharp". Entertainment Weekly's Madison Vain called the song "inescapable and irritating".

Michael Cragg of The Observer referred to "Marvin Gaye" as "inordinately embarrassing", stating that it sees Puth cast himself as Trainor's male version. Writing for AllMusic, Stephen Thomas Erlewine wrote that the song "suggested neither singer ever heard Gaye nor Motown but were inordinately fond of Glee", and included it as an example of collaborations where Puth acts as "the second banana, happily ceding the spotlight to another act who bowls him over with charisma". Spin's Jason Gubbels stated that it is "a low-heat ode to high-heat passion, about as edgy as a Broadway revival cast recording and featuring one of the more dubious name-verbing exercises in contemporary pop" since Beyoncé's "Partition" (2013).

"Marvin Gaye" made it on several year-end lists of the worst songs of 2015. Time included the song, calling the first line of its chorus so "cringe-worthy" that it made them wonder "why the Gaye estate didn't also sue these two in addition to the 'Blurred Lines' guys" for tarnishing his legacy, but called Trainor its redeeming quality. It also appeared on Jezebel's list, with Tolentino calling it "transposed to the ninth circle of hell" and comparing it to Christian musicals she used to attend as a child. Gigwise included "Marvin Gaye" on their list, with Alexandra Pollard elaborating that it is "irritatingly catchy—but it's not even catchy", and went on to say that it is an unclever and "really stupid play on words".

== Chart performance ==
"Marvin Gaye" debuted at number 87 on the US Billboard Hot 100 issued for July 4, 2015. The song climbed to its peak of number 21 on October 10, 2015. The Recording Industry Association of America (RIAA) certified it 3× Platinum, which denotes three million units based on sales and track-equivalent on-demand streams. On the Canadian Hot 100, "Marvin Gaye" peaked at number 31 and was certified 3× Platinum by Music Canada.

"Marvin Gaye" debuted at number 90 on the UK Singles Chart issued for August 7, 2015, based only on streams. Following its digital release as a single in the United Kingdom, the song vaulted to number one, becoming both artists' second number-one in the UK. The song was certified 2× Platinum by the British Phonographic Industry (BPI). In Australia, it reached number four and went 2× Platinum. "Marvin Gaye" peaked at number one in New Zealand and was certified 3× Platinum. The song charted within the top 10 of national record charts, at number one in France, Ireland, Israel, Scotland, number two in Switzerland, number three in Austria, Poland, Spain, number four in Belgium (Wallonia), number five in Slovenia, number six in Italy, and number nine in Iceland. It received a 3× Platinum certification in Italy, 2× Platinum in Sweden, Platinum in Denmark, Germany, Norway, Spain, Switzerland, and Gold in Austria and Belgium.

== Music video ==
Marc Klasfeld directed the music video for "Marvin Gaye", which was released on April 1, 2015. Puth summed up its concept by saying that he "wanted to make a video of how [he] always wanted high school to be -- a fun dance with people making out, on the floor, with whipped cream and strawberries". The video begins with bored students sleeping with their heads against walls, after which Puth shows up and starts performing the song. All of the students start making out by the chorus. Trainor joins Puth on the stage during her verse and the two sing together. The video ends with the two about to kiss.

Trainor later revealed in an interview with MTV News that she actually kissed Puth "a bunch of times", but called it "so awkward" due to the presence of 40 people at the set and Puth's parents in the green room. She uploaded a clip from behind the scenes of the video on her Instagram account, in which the singers kiss for a longer time. Puth stated that they "had to do it five times, different angles, different lighting" as people at the set kept moving lights around, but "the word 'awkward' never came to mind because Meghan's a very good kisser". Christina Garibaldi of MTV News placed it at number two on her list of the "11 Hot Music Video Kisses of 2015 That'll Make You Blush".

== Live performances ==
Puth and Trainor performed "Marvin Gaye" at The Today Show on August 4, 2015. The performance began with Puth playing the song at a piano, where the latter joined him during her verse, dressed in a black skirt. They also performed it during the American Music Awards of 2015 on November 22, 2015. The performance ended with a kiss between the two, midway through which Puth grabbed Trainor's buttocks and she placed her hands on his jaws. Los Angeles Times's Jessica Gelt wrote that it might be the most talked-about kiss at an award show since Britney Spears and Madonna kissed at the 2003 MTV Video Music Awards.

Jeff Benjamin of Fuse listed it as the sixth best performance of the night, adding that the kiss "made [it] one to remember". On the other hand, Rolling Stone dubbed it one of the worst moments of the show, stating that the background dancers looked like "middle-school students allowed to stage a production of Grease without adult supervision" and calling the kiss a "forced 'moment'". Puth described the kiss as "a visual representation" of "Marvin Gaye", and stated that he wanted both to represent "a record people could put on and fall in love with each other the minute they hear it". The song was included on the setlists for the MTrain Tour as well as Puth's Voicenotes Tour (2018).

== Track listing ==
- Digital download
1. "Marvin Gaye" (featuring Meghan Trainor) – 3:10
- Remix EP
1. "Marvin Gaye" (featuring Meghan Trainor) (DJ Kue Remix) – 5:33
2. "Marvin Gaye" (featuring Meghan Trainor) (Cahill Remix) – 2:57
3. "Marvin Gaye" (featuring Meghan Trainor) (Boehm Remix) – 3:14
4. "Marvin Gaye" (featuring Meghan Trainor) (10K Islands Remix) – 3:10
- CD single
1. "Marvin Gaye" (featuring Meghan Trainor) – 3:10
2. "Marvin Gaye" (featuring Wale) – 3:20

== Credits and personnel ==
Credits adapted from CD single's liner notes.

- Charlie Puth – producer, lead vocals, programmer
- Meghan Trainor – featured vocals
- Chris Galland – assistant mixing engineer
- Ike Schultz – assistant mixing engineer
- Kaveh Rastegar – bass guitarist
- Dave Kutch – mastering engineer
- Manny Marroquin – mixing engineer
- Ryan Gladieux – recording engineer

== Charts ==
=== Weekly charts ===
Weekly chart positions for "Marvin Gaye"
Chart (2015)	Peak position
Australia (ARIA)	4
Austria (Ö3 Austria Top 40)	3
Belgium (Ultratop 50 Flanders)	12
Belgium (Ultratop 50 Wallonia)	4
Canada Hot 100 (Billboard)	31
Czech Republic Airplay (ČNS IFPI)	11
Czech Republic Singles Digital (ČNS IFPI)	21
Denmark (Tracklisten)	28
Euro Digital Song Sales (Billboard)	1
Finland (Suomen virallinen lista)	16
France (SNEP)	1
Germany (Official German Charts)	15
Hungary (Editors' Choice Top 40)	32
Hungary (Single Top 40)	21
Hungary (Stream Top 40)	38
Iceland (RÚV)	9
Ireland (IRMA)	1
Israel International Airplay (Media Forest)	1
Italy (FIMI)	6
Japan (Japan Hot 100)	60
Luxembourg Digital Songs (Billboard)	6
Mexico (Billboard Ingles Airplay)	32
Mexico Anglo (Monitor Latino)	7
Netherlands (Dutch Top 40)	11
Netherlands (Single Top 100)	19
New Zealand (Recorded Music NZ)	1
Norway (VG-lista)	17
Poland Airplay (ZPAV)	3
Romania TV Airplay (Media Forest)	7
Scottish Singles Sales (Official Charts)	1
Slovakia Airplay (ČNS IFPI)	11
Slovakia Singles Digital (ČNS IFPI)	20
Slovenia (SloTop50)	5
Spain (Promusicae)	3
Sweden (Sverigetopplistan)	29
Switzerland (Schweizer Hitparade)	2
UK Singles (Official Charts)	1
US Billboard Hot 100	21
US Adult Contemporary (Billboard)	27
US Adult Pop Airplay (Billboard)	12
US Dance Airplay (Billboard)	31
US Pop Airplay (Billboard)	15

=== Year-end charts ===
2015 year-end chart positions for "Marvin Gaye"
Chart (2015)	Position
Australia (ARIA)	38
Austria (Ö3 Austria Top 40)	32
Belgium (Ultratop 50 Flanders)	96
Belgium (Ultratop 50 Wallonia)	99
Canada (Canadian Hot 100)	78
Denmark (Tracklisten)	87
France (SNEP)	49
Germany (Official German Charts)	77
Israel (Media Forest)	15
Italy (FIMI)	38
Netherlands (Dutch Top 40)	85
New Zealand (Recorded Music NZ)	17
Poland (ZPAV)	16
Spain (PROMUSICAE)	72
Switzerland (Schweizer Hitparade)	30
Sweden (Sverigetopplistan)	96
UK Singles (Official Charts Company)	34
US Billboard Hot 100	75
US Adult Top 40 (Billboard)	41

2016 year-end chart positions for "Marvin Gaye"
Chart (2016)	Position
Belgium (Ultratop 50 Wallonia)	99
France (SNEP)	129
Netherlands (Dutch Top 40)	98
Slovenia (SloTop50)	7
Switzerland (Schweizer Hitparade)	96

2017 year-end chart position for "Marvin Gaye"
Chart (2017)	Position
Slovenia (SloTop50)	50

== Certifications ==
Certifications for "Marvin Gaye"
Region	Certification	Certified units/sales
Australia (ARIA)	4× Platinum	280,000^{‡}
Austria (IFPI Austria)	Gold	15,000^{‡}
Belgium (BRMA)	Gold	10,000^{‡}
Canada (Music Canada)	3× Platinum	240,000^{‡}
Denmark (IFPI Danmark)	Platinum	60,000^{^}
Germany (BVMI)	Platinum	400,000^{‡}
Italy (FIMI)	3× Platinum	150,000^{‡}
New Zealand (RMNZ)	3× Platinum	90,000^{‡}
Norway (IFPI Norway)	Platinum	40,000^{‡}
Poland (ZPAV)	Platinum	50,000^{‡}
Portugal (AFP)	Gold	10,000^{‡}
Spain (Promusicae)	Platinum	40,000^{‡}
Sweden (GLF)	2× Platinum	80,000^{‡}
Switzerland (IFPI Switzerland)	Platinum	30,000^{‡}
United Kingdom (BPI)	2× Platinum	1,200,000^{‡}
United States (RIAA)	4× Platinum	4,000,000^{‡}
^{^} Shipments figures based on certification alone.^{‡} Sales+streaming figures based on certification alone.

== Release history ==
Release dates and format(s) for "Marvin Gaye"
Region	Date	Format(s)	Version	Label	Ref.
Various	February 10, 2015	Digital download; streaming	Original	Artist Partner	
Italy	July 10, 2015	Contemporary hit radio	Original	Warner	
Various	August 28, 2015	Digital download; streaming	Remixes	Artist Partner	
Various	September 18, 2015	CD	Original	Atlantic	
