= Connection (OneRepublic song) =

2018 single by OneRepublic

Single by OneRepublic
- Released: June 26, 2018
- Length: 2:28
- Label: Interscope; Mosley
- Songwriters: Ryan Tedder; Brent Kutzle; Zach Skelton; Noel Zancanella; Jacob Kasher; Kevin Fisher
- Producers: Ryan Tedder; Brent Kutzle; Zach Skelton; Tyler Spry

OneRepublic singles chronology
"Start Again" (2018)	"Connection" (2018)	"Bones" (2019)

Music video
- "Connection" on YouTube

"Connection" is a song by American pop rock band OneRepublic. The song was released as a single via digital download on June 26, 2018. The song was sent as a radio single.

It was written by band members Ryan Tedder, Brent Kutzle, as well as Zach Skelton, Noel Zancanella and Jacob Kasher.

== Commercial performance ==
"Connection" sold 32,000 digital copies in its first week and debuted on the Billboard Digital Songs Sales chart at number 23. The song was also streamed for over 10.8 million times and peaked at number twenty-one on the Billboard Bubbling Under Hot 100 chart.

== Music video ==
The official music video for the song was released on August 28, 2018, through Vevo. As of October 1, 2022, the video has achieved over 24 million views.

The video's setting is within the Oculus New York's World Trade Center station, with lead singer Ryan Tedder wandering around looking for a 'connection' to end his loneliness. Various extras dressed in business attire are shown staring at the palms of their hands (like a phone screen) as an interpretive dancer performs. A brief cutscene shows him driving a Jeep Cherokee through Manhattan.

A majority of the video is shot in black and white except for the last chorus, where the whole band is performing and the station is illuminated by purple lightning. The video was directed by Joel Pront.

== Usage in media ==
"Connection" appeared in Jeep's "2018 Summer of Jeep: Sold Out" commercial. The appearance led the song to top the Billboard Top Commercial Songs chart in July 2018.

It is part of the R.B.I. Baseball 19 soundtrack.

It also appears in the trailer and the opening scene for the 2019 movie Jexi.

== Track listing ==
Digital download
No.	Title	Length
1.	"Connection"	2:28

== Charts ==
=== Weekly charts ===
Chart (2018)	Peak position
Belarus Airplay (Eurofest)	11
Canada Hot AC (Billboard)	22
Czech Republic Airplay (ČNS IFPI)	1
Ireland (IRMA)	84
Switzerland (Schweizer Hitparade)	92
US Bubbling Under Hot 100 (Billboard)	21
US Adult Contemporary (Billboard)	28
US Adult Pop Airplay (Billboard)	9
US Digital Song Sales (Billboard)	23

=== Monthly charts ===
Chart (2018)	Position
US Commercial Songs (Billboard)	1

=== Year-end charts ===
Chart (2018)	Position
US Adult Top 40 (Billboard)	48

== Certifications ==
Region	Certification	Certified units/sales
Australia (ARIA)	Gold	35,000^{‡}
Brazil (Pro-Música Brasil)	Platinum	40,000^{‡}
Italy (FIMI)	Gold	25,000^{‡}
New Zealand (RMNZ)	Gold	15,000^{‡}
United States (RIAA)	Platinum	1,000,000^{‡}
^{‡} Sales+streaming figures based on certification alone.

== Release history ==
Region	Date	Format	Label
Various	26 July 2018	Digital download; streaming	Mosley Music Group; Interscope
