= Rhyme or Reason =

Song by Eminem

from the album The Marshall Mathers LP 2
- Released: November 5, 2013
- Recorded: Effigy Studios (Ferndale, Michigan), Shangri La Studios (Malibu, California)
- Genre: Hip hop
- Length: 5:01
- Label: Aftermath; Shady; Interscope
- Songwriters: Marshall Mathers; Rodney Argent
- Producers: Eminem; Rick Rubin

"Rhyme or Reason" is a song from Eminem's eighth studio album The Marshall Mathers LP 2. The song concerns his father's abandonment of his wife and Eminem when Eminem was born. Produced by the album's executive producer Rick Rubin, the song contains samples of The Zombies' "Time of the Season" from their 1968 album Odessey and Oracle. The song received positive reviews from music critics.

== Background and theme ==
In the song, Eminem discusses his father, who left him and his mother when he was born; as well as his skill as a rapper and fame. In the bridge, Eminem sings along with the chorus of "Time of the Season" with altered lyrics, and in one part he responds as Shady and references his song "Just Don't Give a Fuck".

== Composition ==
The song was produced by the album's executive producer Rick Rubin and written by Eminem and Rod Argent of The Zombies. The song samples "Time of the Season" from their 1968 album Odessey and Oracle. It was recorded by Mike Strange, Joe Strange and Tony Campana. The Zombies' keyboardist, Rod Argent, who wrote "Time of the Season", is given a co-songwriting credit.

== Critical response ==
Rhyme or Reason received generally positive reviews from music critics. Dan Rys of XXL Magazine said that the song, along with "So Far..." will "grow on you by getting stuck in your head, and before long you’ll know every word and skip ahead to hear the familiar refrains and deft flows." Nick Catucci of Entertainment Weekly called the song one of the "album's most endearingly bonkers tracks."

== Chart performance ==
Chart (2013)	Peak position
US Bubbling Under Hot 100 (Billboard)	13
US Hot R&B/Hip-Hop Songs (Billboard)	41
