= We Don't Talk Anymore (Charlie Puth song) =

2016 single by Charlie Puth featuring Selena Gomez

Single by Charlie Puth featuring Selena Gomez

from the album Nine Track Mind
- Released: May 24, 2016
- Recorded: 2015
- Studio: Atlantic Studios (Los Angeles, CA)
- Genre: Pop
- Length: 3:37
- Label: Atlantic
- Songwriters: Charlie Puth; Selena Gomez; Jacob Kasher Hindlin
- Producer: Charlie Puth

Charlie Puth singles chronology
"One Call Away" (2015)	"We Don't Talk Anymore" (2016)	"Dangerously" (2016)

Selena Gomez singles chronology
"Kill Em with Kindness" (2016)	"We Don't Talk Anymore" (2016)	"Trust Nobody" (2016)

Music video
- "We Don't Talk Anymore" on YouTube

"We Don't Talk Anymore" is a song by the American singer-songwriter Charlie Puth, featuring vocals from Selena Gomez. It was released on May 24, 2016, as the third single from Puth's debut album, Nine Track Mind (2016). The artists wrote the song with Jacob Kasher Hindlin. Musically, it is a tropical-inspired pop song.

The song peaked at number 9 on the US Billboard Hot 100, earning Puth his second Top 10 single and Gomez's sixth and Puth's second highest-charting single as a lead artist to date, behind "Attention". It has also attained Top 10 status in more than 20 countries, and reached number 1 in Italy, Lebanon, and Romania. It is certified quintuple Platinum in the US, Australia, and Italy, as well as Diamond in Canada and France.

== Background ==
Puth created the guitar line during a trip in Japan. He produced the beat in the Philippines and recorded his vocals in Los Angeles. Months later Puth played the song for Selena Gomez, whom he had met previously at an after party following the MTV Video Music Awards. He thought that their voices would complement each other well and then asked her to sing the second verse. Gomez's vocals were recorded in Puth's closet. Her recording session lasted approximately 15 minutes. On December 10, 2015, Puth posted a snippet of the song announcing the collaboration with Gomez. On January 10, 2016, Puth posted a second teaser.

== Composition ==
"We Don't Talk Anymore" is a pop song with a tropical-inspired production. Bobby Oliver of NJ.com described it as "a pulsing club jam." Lyrically, the song takes perspective from a former couple and their struggle to maintain a normal communication system in the aftermath of their break-up. Puth said the song is about "relationships where you're obsessed with that one person, but then you break it up peacefully, but it's changed. You can't talk to them like friends anymore. You can say you want to remain friends, but it's easier said than done. It’s heartbreaking. 'We Don't Talk Anymore' is basically the conversation a month after that type of breakup."

== Critical reception ==
The song was met with critical acclaim from critics. Writing for Spin, Brennan Carley found the song "wisely trades verses between the two pop forces, cashing in on the trop-house trend" and added that it is "a worthy, breezy slice of pop." Bobby Oliver of NJ.com wrote the song is "wonderfully infectious, and feels destined for hit radio." MTV's Madeline Roth praised the singers' vocals by saying they "blend so beautifully together." Marie Sherman of Fuse said the song is "freaking catchy" and that the chorus would be stuck in people's heads. Lindsey Sullivan of Billboard called the song "ridiculously catchy". Idolator's Mike Wass opined that the song "sounds like a smash." Dee Lockett of Vulture.com deemed it "the chillest breakup duet."

== Music videos ==
=== Live performance video ===
A live performance video was released on July 19, 2016. It features Puth and Gomez performing with the latter's Revival Tour in Anaheim, California on July 9.

=== Official video ===
The music video premiered on August 2, 2016, on BuzzFeed and was directed by Phil Pinto. It shows Puth and Mirella Cardoso as his love interest. This video does not include the appearance of Gomez due to her Revival Tour, but only used the version of Puth and Gomez. As of August 2025, the video has over 3.3 billion views and 15 million likes on YouTube and is the site's 46th most-viewed video. It was nominated for Best Collaboration at 2017 MTV Video Music Awards but lost to Zayn and Taylor Swift's "I Don't Wanna Live Forever".

== Accolades ==
Awards and nominations for "We Don't Talk Anymore"
Organization	Year	Category	Result	Ref.
ASCAP Pop Music Awards	2017	Winning Songs	Won	
Hit FM Music Awards (China)	2017	Top 10 Singles	Won	
Hito Music Awards	2017	Western Song of the Year	Won	
MTV Video Music Awards	2017	Best Collaboration	Nominated	
Radio Disney Music Awards	2017	Best Breakup Song	Nominated	
Radio Disney Music Awards	2017	Best Collaboration	Nominated	
RTHK International Pop Poll Awards	2017	Top Ten International Gold Songs	Won	
Teen Choice Awards	2016	Choice Break-Up Song	Nominated	

== Credits and personnel ==
- Charlie Puth – lead vocals, songwriter, producer
- Selena Gomez – lead vocals, songwriter
- Jacob Kasher Hindlin – songwriter

== Charts ==
=== Weekly charts ===
Weekly chart performance for "We Don't Talk Anymore"
Chart (2016)	Peak position
Argentina (Monitor Latino)	15
Australia (ARIA)	10
Austria (Ö3 Austria Top 40)	23
Belgium (Ultratop 50 Flanders)	18
Belgium (Ultratop 50 Wallonia)	36
Brazil (Billboard Brasil Hot 100)	91
Canada Hot 100 (Billboard)	11
CIS Airplay (TopHit)	4
Czech Republic Airplay (ČNS IFPI)	7
Czech Republic Singles Digital (ČNS IFPI)	16
Denmark (Tracklisten)	13
Finland Airplay (Radiosoittolista)	14
France (SNEP)	8
Germany (GfK)	52
Global Excl. US (Billboard)	187
Greece Airplay Chart (IFPI)	17
Hungary (Rádiós Top 40)	5
Hungary (Single Top 40)	5
Ireland (IRMA)	11
Italy (FIMI)	1
Lebanon (Lebanese Top 20)	1
Mexico Ingles Airplay (Billboard)	4
Netherlands (Dutch Top 40)	17
Netherlands (Single Top 100)	14
New Zealand (Recorded Music NZ)	8
Norway (VG-lista)	10
Poland Airplay (ZPAV)	10
Portugal (AFP)	5
Romania (Airplay 100)	1
Romania Airplay (Media Forest)	1
Romania TV Airplay (Media Forest)	1
Russia Airplay (TopHit)	3
Scottish Singles Sales (Official Charts)	14
Slovakia Airplay (ČNS IFPI)	3
Slovakia Singles Digital (ČNS IFPI)	9
Slovenia (SloTop50)	31
Spain (Promusicae)	6
Sweden (Sverigetopplistan)	13
Switzerland (Schweizer Hitparade)	16
UK Singles (Official Charts)	14
Ukraine Airplay (TopHit)	3
US Billboard Hot 100	9
US Adult Contemporary (Billboard)	11
US Adult Pop Airplay (Billboard)	9
US Dance Airplay (Billboard)	36
US Pop Airplay (Billboard)	11

2025–2026 weekly chart performance for "We Don't Talk Anymore"
Chart (2025–2026)	Peak position
Romania Airplay (TopHit)	89
Vietnam (Vietnam Hot 100)	12

=== Year-end charts ===
2016 year-end chart performance for "We Don't Talk Anymore"
Chart (2016)	Position
Argentina (Monitor Latino)	41
Australia (ARIA)	53
Belgium (Ultratop Flanders)	71
Brazil (Brasil Hot 100)	86
Canada (Canadian Hot 100)	34
CIS (Tophit)	51
Denmark (Tracklisten)	39
France (SNEP)	64
Hungary (Rádiós Top 40)	77
Hungary (Single Top 40)	30
Italy (FIMI)	24
Netherlands (Dutch Top 40)	94
Netherlands (Single Top 100)	61
New Zealand (Recorded Music NZ)	37
Russia Airplay (Tophit)	47
Spain (PROMUSICAE)	43
Sweden (Sverigetopplistan)	73
Switzerland (Schweizer Hitparade)	62
UK Singles (Official Charts Company)	61
US Billboard Hot 100	50
US Adult Contemporary (Billboard)	30
US Adult Top 40 (Billboard)	31
US Mainstream Top 40 (Billboard)	38

2017 year-end chart performance for "We Don't Talk Anymore"
Chart (2017)	Position
Brazil (Pro-Música Brasil)	149
Spain Airplay (PROMUSICAE)	30

== Certifications and sales ==
Certifications and sales for We Don't Talk Anymore
Region	Certification	Certified units/sales
Australia (ARIA)	6× Platinum	420,000^{‡}
Belgium (BRMA)	Platinum	20,000^{‡}
Canada (Music Canada)	Diamond	800,000^{‡}
Denmark (IFPI Danmark)	2× Platinum	180,000^{‡}
France (SNEP)	Diamond	333,333^{‡}
Germany (BVMI)	Gold	200,000^{‡}
Italy (FIMI)	5× Platinum	250,000^{‡}
New Zealand (RMNZ)	5× Platinum	150,000^{‡}
Norway (IFPI Norway)	2× Platinum	120,000^{‡}
Poland (ZPAV)	3× Platinum	150,000^{‡}
Portugal (AFP)	2× Platinum	20,000^{‡}
South Korea	—	2,500,000
Spain (Promusicae)	3× Platinum	180,000^{‡}
Switzerland (IFPI Switzerland)	Gold	15,000^{‡}
United Kingdom (BPI)	2× Platinum	1,200,000^{‡}
United States (RIAA)	5× Platinum	5,000,000^{‡}
Streaming
Japan (RIAJ)	Platinum	100,000,000^{†}
^{‡} Sales+streaming figures based on certification alone.^{†} Streaming-only figures based on certification alone.

== Release history ==
Country	Date	Format	Label	Ref.
United States	May 24, 2016	Contemporary hit radio	Atlantic	

== See also ==
- List of most-viewed YouTube videos
- List of Airplay 100 number ones of the 2010s
