= Bones (Galantis song) =

Single by Galantis featuring OneRepublic

from the album Church
- Released: 31 January 2019
- Length: 3:26
- Label: Big Beat; Atlantic; WMG
- Songwriters: Andrew Grammer; Ryan Tedder; David Brook; Brett McLaughlin; Daniel Majic; Justin Franks; Christian Karlsson; Linus Eklow; Jimmy "Svidden" Koitzsch; Henrik Jonback
- Producers: Galantis; Svidden; Jonback; Majic; DJ Frank E

Galantis singles chronology
"San Francisco" (2018)	"Bones" (2019)	"I Found U" (2019)

OneRepublic singles chronology
"Connection" (2018)	"Bones" (2019)	"Rescue Me" (2019)

Music video
- "Bones" on YouTube

"Bones" is a song by Swedish electronic music duo Galantis featuring vocals from American pop rock band OneRepublic, released on 31 January 2019 via Atlantic Records in the United States and WEA International elsewhere around the globe. It was written by Bloodshy, Ryan Tedder, David Brook, Brett McLaughlin, Danny Majic, DJ Frank E, and Andy Grammer with production handled by Galantis, Bloodshy, Ryan Tedder, Danny Majic and DJ Frank E.

== Track listing ==
- Digital download
1. "Bones" – 3:26
- Digital download – Steff da Campo Remix
1. "Bones" (Steff da Campo Remix) – 2:47
- Digital download – Hook N Sling Remix
1. "Bones" (Hook N Sling Remix) – 3:14
- Digital download – B-Sights Remix Remix
1. "Bones" (B-Sights Remix Remix) – 2:55

== Credits and personnel ==
Credits adapted from Tidal.

- Production – Christian "Bloodshy" Karlsson, Henrik Jonback, Danny Majic, Frank E
- All instruments – Christian "Bloodshy" Karlsson, Henrik Jonback, Danny Majic
- Arranger – Christian Karlsson, Henrik Jonback
- Featured artist – OneRepublic
- Main artist – Galantis
- Mastering – Cass Irvine
- Mixing – Galantis, Niklas Flyckt
- Vocals – Ryan Tedder
- Writer – Andy Grammer, Brett McLaughlin, Christian Karlsson, Danny Majic, David Brook, Henrik Jonbak, Jimmy Koitzsch, Justin Franks, Ryan Tedder

== Charts ==
=== Weekly charts ===
Chart (2019)	Peak position
Austria (Ö3 Austria Top 40)	58
Belgium (Ultratip Bubbling Under Flanders)	1
Belgium Dance (Ultratop Flanders)	9
Czech Republic Airplay (ČNS IFPI)	16
Czech Republic Singles Digital (ČNS IFPI)	76
Germany (Airplay Chart)	4
Hungary (Rádiós Top 40)	19
Lithuania (AGATA)	45
Mexico Airplay (Billboard)	30
New Zealand Hot Singles (RMNZ)	13
Poland Airplay (ZPAV)	54
Slovakia Airplay (ČNS IFPI)	88
Slovakia Singles Digital (ČNS IFPI)	70
Slovenia (SloTop50)	20
Sweden (Sverigetopplistan)	46
Switzerland (Schweizer Hitparade)	63
Ukraine Airplay (TopHit)	53
US Hot Dance/Electronic Songs (Billboard)	17

=== Year-end charts ===
Chart (2019)	Position
Hungary (Rádiós Top 40)	50
US Hot Dance/Electronic Songs (Billboard)	47

== Certifications ==
Region	Certification	Certified units/sales
Brazil (Pro-Música Brasil)	Gold	20,000^{‡}
Canada (Music Canada)	Gold	40,000^{‡}
New Zealand (RMNZ)	Gold	15,000^{‡}
Italy (FIMI)	Gold	25,000^{‡}
^{‡} Sales+streaming figures based on certification alone.

== Release history ==
Region	Date	Format	Label	Ref.
United States	31 January 2019	Digital download; streaming	Atlantic	
