= Lighter (Galantis, David Guetta and 5 Seconds of Summer song) =

Single by Galantis, David Guetta and 5 Seconds of Summer

from the album Rx
- Released: 1 March 2024
- Genre: Dance-pop
- Length: 2:52
- Label: Big Beat
- Songwriters: Bloodshy; Henrik Jonback; David Saint Fleur; Aukoustics; David Guetta; Kyle Reynolds; David Brook; Benjamin Samama; Embody; Luke Hemmings; Michael Clifford; Calum Hood; Ashton Irwin
- Producers: Bloodshy; Jonback; Fleur; Aukoustics; Guetta; Misha K; Embody; Clifford

Galantis singles chronology
"One, Two & 3" (2024)	"Lighter" (2024)	"Dust" (2024)

David Guetta singles chronology
"All Night Long" (2024)	"Lighter" (2024)	"The Future Is Now" / "The Truth" (2024)

5 Seconds of Summer singles chronology
"Older" (2022)	"Lighter" (2024)	"Not OK" (2025)

Music video
- "Lighter" on YouTube

"Lighter" is a song by Swedish electronic artist Galantis, French DJ David Guetta and Australian pop rock band 5 Seconds of Summer. It was released on 1 March 2024, as a single from Galantis' fourth studio album, Rx, via Big Beat Records.

== Background ==
Speaking about the song, Christian Karlsson stated,

"'Lighter' is a special song because the creative momentum between myself, David and 5SOS aligned so well – we let the collaboration flow into a piece of music that feels emotional and timeless. Michael [Clifford] is such a music lover very much like me, and working closely with him on producing the live elements like strings, guitar and drums was very inspiring. And it's always great working with David, after the amazing response we had with 'Heartbreak Anthem' it's exciting to be putting out another big record together."

== Composition ==
"Lighter" first came up when a writer of Karlsson's played him a raw recording of the track around two years ago. Though interested, Karlsson almost scrapped the track before finding David Guetta and 5 Seconds of Summer to help work on the song. According to guitarist Michael Clifford, the idea of the collaboration was brought up a year ago.

The track was written by Bloodshy, Henrik Jonback, David Saint Fleur, Aukoustics, David Guetta, Kyle Reynolds, David Brook, Benjamin Samama, Embody, Luke Hemmings, Michael Clifford, Calum Hood and Ashton Irwin, while production was handled by Karlsson, Guetta, Clifford, Jonback, Fleur, Aukoustics, Misha K and Embody.

== Critical reception ==
"Lighter" was met with positive reviews from music critics. Shannon Garner of EUPHORIA stated, "'Lighter' is a foray into dance music [...] incorporating their distinct styles, the dreamy track is produced in a way that ascends you into another reality with its breezy, danceable beats and infectious sing-along choruses." Hannah Gadd of Redbrick remarked, "The lyrics are on the simpler side, something which is unusual from 5SOS' recent music but works with this genre. The message is clear; the song details the comfort in which time spent with a lover can bring and thus feeling 'lighter'."

== Personnel ==
Musicians

- Luke Hemmings – lead vocals, piano
- Michael Clifford – vocals, guitar
- Calum Hood – vocals
- Ashton Irwin – vocals

Additional musicians

- Boerd – double bass
- Dan Trapp – drums
- Henrik Jonback – bass
- Aukoustics – bass, guitar, piano, backing vocals
- Benjamin Samama – piano, backing vocals
- David Brook – backing vocals
- Kyle Reynolds – backing vocals
- Vicky Sayles, Tove Lund, Paul Waltman, Patrik Swedrup, Lola Torrente, Oscar Treitler, Kristina Ebbersten, Fredrik Syberg, Daniel Migdal, Danial Shariati & Carl Vallin – violin
- Pelle Hansen, Filip Lundberg & Andreas Lavotha – cello
- Mikael Sjögren, James Opie, Erik Holm & Christopher Öhman – viola
- Stockholm Studio Orchestra – strings

Production

- Christian Karlsson – producer, mixing
- Henrik Jonback – producer
- David Saint Fleur – producer
- Aukoustics – producer
- Misha K – producer, mixing
- David Guetta – producer
- Embody – producer
- Michael Clifford – producer
- Cass Irvine – mastering
- Erik Arvinder – conductor, strings arrangement, strings recording engineer
- James Musshorn – engineering
- Willem Bleeker – strings recording engineer
- John Feldmann – drums recording engineer
- Lemon Blue – vocal recording engineer
- Juan Arguello – assistant vocal recording engineer

== Charts ==
=== Weekly charts ===
Weekly chart performance for "Lighter"
Chart (2024)	Peak position
Australia (ARIA)	99
Belarus Airplay (TopHit)	49
Belgium (Ultratop 50 Flanders)	28
CIS Airplay (TopHit)	34
Czech Republic Airplay (ČNS IFPI)	2
Estonia Airplay (TopHit)	29
Japan (Japan Hot Overseas)	13
Latvia Airplay (LaIPA)	19
Lithuania Airplay (TopHit)	7
Netherlands (Dutch Top 40)	32
Netherlands (Single Top 100)	78
New Zealand Hot Singles (RMNZ)	7
Poland (Polish Airplay Top 100)	17
Russia Airplay (TopHit)	37
Slovakia Airplay (ČNS IFPI)	51
Spain Airplay (TopHit)	95
Sweden Heatseaker (Sverigetopplistan)	1
UK Singles (Official Charts)	78
UK Dance (Official Charts)	31
US Hot Dance/Electronic Songs (Billboard)	9

=== Year-end charts ===
Year-end chart performance for "Lighter"
Chart (2024)	Position
Belarus Airplay (TopHit)	198
Belgium (Ultratop 50 Flanders)	66
Lithuania Airplay (TopHit)	56
US Dance/Mix Show Airplay (Billboard)	25
