= Dangerously (song) =

Single by Charlie Puth

from the album Nine Track Mind
- Released: December 2, 2016
- Genre: Pop R&B
- Length: 3:19
- Label: Atlantic
- Songwriters: Charlie Puth; Jonathan Rotem; Marco Rodriguez-Diaz, Jr.; James Abrahart; Alexander Izquierdo
- Producers: Puth; J. R. Rotem; Infamous

Charlie Puth singles chronology
"We Don't Talk Anymore" (2016)	"Dangerously" (2016)	"Attention" (2017)

Music video
- "Dangerously" on YouTube

"Dangerously" is a song by American singer-songwriter Charlie Puth. It was sent to Italian radio stations as the fourth and final single from his debut studio album Nine Track Mind, on December 2, 2016. A pop ballad that deals with heartbreak, "Dangerously" was composed after Puth was inspired by singer Bruno Mars' 2010 hit single "Grenade".

== Background and composition ==
"Dangerously" is a pop music ballad that was composed after Puth was inspired by Bruno Mars' 2010 hit single "Grenade".

== Reception ==
It was reported that by 9 December 2016, "Dangerously" had received over 17 million streams across YouTube and Spotify. The song charted in South Korea in 2023 after K-pop girl group member Ahyeon of Babymonster did a cover that went viral.

== Music video ==
The official music video was released on November 2, 2016, on YouTube. It was directed by Aya Tanimura. The music video was described by Teen Vogue as deeply vulnerable and emotionally compelling, critics praised its message about heartbreak and storytelling. It has more than 162 million views as of May 2024.

== Charts ==
=== Weekly charts ===
Chart performance for "Dangerously"
Chart (2016–2017)	Peak position
Belgium (Ultratip Bubbling Under Wallonia)	5
Czech Republic Airplay (ČNS IFPI)	35
France (SNEP)	169
Hungary (Rádiós Top 40)	29
New Zealand Heatseekers (RMNZ)	10
Slovakia Airplay (ČNS IFPI)	45

2022–2023 chart performance for "Dangerously"
Chart (2022–2023)	Peak position
South Korea (Circle)	15
Vietnam (Vietnam Hot 100)	51

=== Monthly charts ===
Monthly chart performance for "Dangerously"
Chart (2023)	Peak position
South Korea (Circle)	20

=== Year-end charts ===
Year-end chart performance for "Dangerously"
Chart	Year	Position
South Korea (Circle)	2023	23
South Korea (Circle)	2024	84
South Korea (Circle)	2025	195

== Certifications ==
Certifications for "Dangerously"
Region	Certification	Certified units/sales
New Zealand (RMNZ)	Platinum	30,000^{‡}
United Kingdom (BPI)	Silver	200,000^{‡}
United States (RIAA)	Gold	500,000^{‡}
^{‡} Sales+streaming figures based on certification alone.

== Release history ==
Release dates and formats for "Dangerously"
Region	Date	Format	Label	Ref.
Various	December 2, 2016	Digital download; streaming	Atlantic	
