= So Far (Eminem song) =

"So Far…"

Song by Eminem

from the album The Marshall Mathers LP 2
- Released: November 5, 2013
- Recorded: Effigy Studios (Ferndale, Michigan), Shangri La Studios (Malibu, California)
- Genre: Hip hop; rap rock
- Length: 5:17
- Label: Aftermath; Shady; Interscope; WEB
- Songwriters: Marshall Mathers; Joe Walsh; Jesse Weaver
- Producer: Rick Rubin

"So Far…" is a song by American hip hop recording artist Eminem, taken from his eighth studio album The Marshall Mathers LP 2 (2013). The song discusses Eminem meditating on the pitfalls of fame and the tendency for things to go wrong at the worst possible moment. The song was produced by the album's executive producer Rick Rubin. "So Far" features samples from the Joe Walsh recording "Life's Been Good" and also contains samples of "P.S.K. What Does It Mean?" as performed by Schoolly D, Change the Beat by Beside, as well as "The Real Slim Shady" and "I'm Back" by himself. The song was met with generally positive reviews from music critics upon the album's release and debuted at number three on the US Billboard Bubbling Under R&B/Hip-Hop Singles.

== Background and theme ==
In the song, Eminem details pitfalls of fame and the tendency for things to go wrong at the worst possible moment, as he uses the song to take a look at his life of living in the "glass house of fame." Also he states the awkwardness that interacting with fans can be sometimes, as explained during an interview with Sway Calloway. Additionally, he references two of his songs from The Marshall Mathers LP, "I'm Back" and "The Real Slim Shady". At the end of the second verse, he raps "The other day someone got all elaborate/And stuck a head from a fucking dead cat in my mailbox", a reference to the song "I'm Back", where he raps "I used to get punked and bullied on my block/'Till I cut a kitten's head off and stuck it in this kid's mailbox". During this line, the beat also changes to the original beat from "I'm Back". He then says "Went to Burger King, they spit on my onion rings/I think my karma is catching up with me". This creates a continuation from "The Real Slim Shady", where he raps "And every single person is a Slim Shady lurking/He could be working at Burger King, spitting on your onion rings." Here the beat then changes to the beat used in "The Real Slim Shady". He also mentions listening to Ludacris while complaining that technology is hurting the distribution of real rap, and name drops his Shady Records-signee Yelawolf. Eminem also states his self-deprecating observations of aging.

== Composition ==
The song was produced by Rick Rubin and written by Eminem, Joe Walsh and Jesse Weaver. Like other Rubin productions on the album, it features a heavy use of samples. In all "So Far" features samples from the Joe Walsh recording "Life's Been Good" and contains excerpts of "P.S.K. What Does It Mean?" as performed by Schoolly D. It was recorded by Mike Strange, Joe Strange and Tony Campana at Effigy Studios in Michigan and Jason Lader at Shangri La Studios in Malibu, California. Additional keys were provided by Luis Resto.

== Critical reception ==
"So Far" was met with generally positive reviews from music critics. Luke Fox of Exclaim! praised the song's production as one of the album's best beat choices. Dan Rys stated, songs like "So Far" will "grow on you by getting stuck in your head, and before long you’ll know every word and skip ahead to hear the familiar refrains and deft flows." Jon Caramanica writing for the New York Times said the song is, "a reminder that Eminem has never settled on a musical aesthetic, only a strategy of rhyme."

Jesal 'Jay Soul' Padania of RapReviews.com said, "Rick Rubin pops up for the third time and kills it (alongside the star of the show) on the cracking Detroit anthem "So Far" - a song that conveniently shows up everything wrong with "Berzerk"." The Metro Times and the Philly Inquirer praised the song's humor. Nick Catucci writing for Entertainment Weekly praised the use of the Joe Walsh sample. In a negative review Mike Diver of Clash said, "It’s so awful that it should be scratched from every physical copy of this album, immediately."

Complex ranked the song at number 41 on their list of the best songs of 2013.

== Chart performance ==
Chart (2013)	Peak position
US Bubbling Under R&B/Hip-Hop Singles (Billboard)	3
