= Payday Music Publishing =

American music publisher

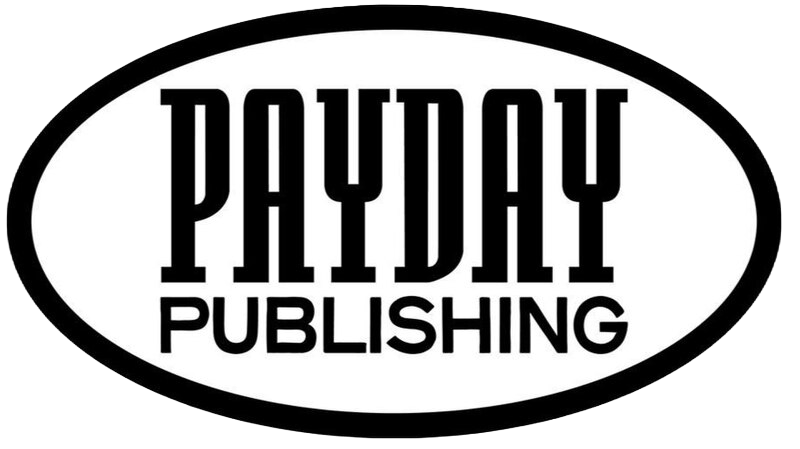
- Founded: 2004
- Genre: Pop, hip-hop, electronic
- Country of origin: United States
- Location: New York City, New York
- Official website: www.paydaypub.com

Payday Music Publishing, previously Ultra International Music Publishing (UIMP), is an American independent music publisher founded in 2004 by Patrick Moxey. It publishes the catalogs of hundreds of songwriters and producers, including Wheezy, Zaytoven, and Marshall Jefferson. Its copyright catalog includes songs by artists such as Drake, Rihanna, David Guetta, and Madonna.

In April 2025, following a lawsuit from Sony Music over the name of Ultra Records, which Sony had acquired from Moxey, Ultra International Music Publishing announced that it would rebrand as Payday Music Publishing.

== History ==
Prior to founding the company, Patrick Moxey had managed Gang Starr and other hip-hop artists through Empire Artist Management. In 1992, Moxey founded Payday Records, which had signed artists such as Jay-Z, Mos Def's group UTD, and Jeru the Damaja and others. In 1996, Moxey founded the Grammy Award-winning record label Ultra Records, which he sold to Sony Music Entertainment in 2021.

Moxey founded Ultra International Music Publishing in 2004,which was rebranded to Payday Music Publishing in 2025, due to a lawsuit from Sony Music.

UIMP signed a deal with record producer and songwriter Wheezy for the rights to publish his catalog in 2018. It went on to sign a deal extension with Wheezy in 2021. The extension gave Ultra Music Publishing rights to songs composed by Wheezy from artists such as Drake, Travis Scott, Meek Mill, and Lil Uzi Vert.

In 2022, Ultra International Music Publishing filed a copyright complaint in the U.S. District Court in New York after Kanye West sampled the 1986 song "Move Your Body" by Marshall Jefferson, which was part of its catalog, without permission. Both parties entered into informal talks about a settlement after West's law firm, Greenberg Traurig, withdrew from the case. In the same year, the publisher signed a deal with Warner Chappell Music that made WCM Ultra's sub-publisher in the United Kingdom.

UIMP signed Atlanta-based songwriter and record producer Zaytoven to a co-publishing deal in 2023. The deal gave UIMP publishing rights to Zaytoven's catalog and provided support for his development of new music, including collaborations with the company in London, Los Angeles, and Atlanta. As a result of the deal, UIMP obtained the rights for songs by artists such as Migos, Travis Scott, Lil Wayne, and 21 Savage.

In 2023, UIMP also signed a deal with Los Angeles-based record producer Christian "Diamond Pistols" Dold to launch the new music publishing company Hidden Gem. In the same year, the company also opened offices in Nigeria, to support its expansion into West Africa and the development of artists in the Afrobeats genre.

In April 2025, following a lawsuit from Sony Music over the name of Ultra Records, which Sony had acquired from Moxey, Ultra International Music Publishing announced that it would rebrand as Payday Music Publishing.

Payday Music Publishing has had shares in top-selling tracks such as "Cheerleader" by OMI, "Firework" by Katy Perry, "Say You Won't Go" by James Arthur, and "Looking for Me" by Diplo.

=== Selected roster ===
- Diamond Pistols
- Marshall Jefferson
- Wheezy
- Zaytoven
