= The Marshall Mathers LP 2 =

Studio album by Eminem
- Released: November 5, 2013
- Recorded: March 2012 – October 2013
- Genres: Hip-hop; rap rock
- Length: 79:49
- Labels: Shady; Goliath; Aftermath; WEB; Interscope
- Producers: Dr. Dre; Rick Rubin; Aalias; Alex da Kid; Cardiak; DJ Khalil; DVLP; Emile; Eminem; Filthy; Frank Dukes; Frequency; Jeff Bhasker; Katalyst; Luis Resto; M-Phazes; S1; Sid Roams; Streetrunner; Vincent Venditto

Eminem chronology
Hell: The Sequel (2011)	The Marshall Mathers LP 2 (2013)	Revival (2017)

Singles from The Marshall Mathers LP 2
- 1. "Berzerk" Released: August 27, 2013; 2. "Survival" Released: October 8, 2013; 3. "Rap God" Released: October 15, 2013; 4. "The Monster" Released: October 29, 2013; 5. "Headlights" Released: February 5, 2014

The Marshall Mathers LP 2 (also referred to as the MMLP2) is the eighth studio album by the American rapper Eminem. It was released on November 5, 2013, by Shady Records, Goliath Artists, Aftermath Entertainment, WEB Entertainment, and Interscope Records. Eminem's mentor Dr. Dre serves as an executive producer alongside Rick Rubin. The album is a sequel to Eminem's third album, The Marshall Mathers LP, and follows his usual style by featuring guest singers—in this case Rihanna and Nate Ruess—and by using outside producers: S1, Alex da Kid and Rick Rubin.

The idea of a sequel to The Marshall Mathers LP came about after Eminem recorded a handful of songs in the early stages of the creation of the album that reminded him of his earlier music, though Eminem wanted to experiment with "retro, vintage" sounds from turntablism for the sequel. The album draws influences from arena rock and old-school hip-hop, mainly inspired by Beastie Boys' Licensed to Ill (1987) and LL Cool J's Radio (1985), while the production is more minimalist than Eminem's previous albums. It was supported by the singles "Berzerk", "Survival", "Rap God", the US number-one hit "The Monster" (featuring Rihanna), and "Headlights" (featuring Nate Ruess), which was released exclusively in Australia.

The Marshall Mathers LP 2 was regarded as one of the most anticipated albums of the year; it sold more than 792,000 copies in its first week in the US as it topped the Billboard 200. In March 2017, it was certified quadruple platinum by the Recording Industry Association of America (RIAA). The album received widely positive reviews, with critics praising Eminem's technical rapping abilities and production choices. It marked an improvement in a reception over Eminem's previous three albums, and was named on multiple best album year-end lists. It won Eminem a record sixth Grammy Award for Best Rap Album at the 2015 Grammy Awards.

== Background ==
"Calling it The Marshall Mathers LP 2, obviously I knew that there might be certain expectations. I wouldn't want to call it that just for the sake of calling it that. I had to make sure that I had the right songs – and just when you think you got it, you listen and you're like, 'Fuck, man. I feel like it needs this or that,' to paint the whole picture. So there's not gonna be, like, continuations of every old song on there or anything like that. To me, it's more about the vibe, and it's more about the nostalgia."

— Eminem, speaking about the album's title with Rolling Stone

On May 24, 2012, Eminem revealed that he was working on his next album, during an interview on Hot 97's morning show with Peter Rosenberg. On June 30, 2012, Eminem talked about the album with DJ Whoo Kid, on his own radio station, Shade 45. He stated that the material was taking shape, and that Dr. Dre would be involved in some way. Eminem explained: "I usually get going and kind of start going a certain direction and just record what I'm feeling. Then I'll go see Dre and fill in some of those pieces."

On August 1, 2012, Nick Craig interviewed Eminem on Channel 95.5, where he explained that he was working on the album, but was focused on finishing Slaughterhouse's Shady Records debut Welcome to: Our House, On August 10 however, Eminem appeared on Shade 45 and told Sway Calloway: "We actually just finished the [Slaughterhouse] album last week ... Now I've got time to be able to start doing things for my own project." Royce da 5'9" appeared on MTV's RapFix, hosted by Calloway, with his group Slaughterhouse, on August 30, 2012, and talked about Eminem's album. Royce confessed: "Marshall is the studio right now, laying the most awesome lyrics in the world. I'm not so sure how the world is going to respond from some of the things that I've heard from him."

On February 8, 2013, Shady Records president and Eminem's manager Paul Rosenberg told Billboard that Eminem's eighth studio album would be released after Memorial Day, 2013 (May 27). "We fully expect to be releasing a new Eminem album in 2013. He's been working on it for some time," said Rosenberg. "It's safe to say that it will be post-Memorial Day at some point, but we're not exactly sure when. We've got some dates locked in for him to perform live in Europe in August, so we're trying to see what else lines up." On March 22, 2013, during an interview with Power 106, Dr. Dre said that he was working with Eminem, and that Eminem was "finishing up his project."

On June 17, 2013, Shady Records producer The Alchemist appeared on RapFix Live, and tweeted to shadygodz (One of the Stan fans aka Sanket Kale Mathers) about Eminem's upcoming album: "That's my boss. I DJ for him and I'm not at liberty to speak on much, but you know his caliber and what he does. Clearly going to further territories. I think what you would expect, especially after the last go-round. He was just getting his feet back on Relapse and then Recovery just came with the smash hits and everything and I think now — he's Eminem." Prior to the announcement of the album's name, it was named to multiple "Most Anticipated Albums of 2013" lists; including MTV, Complex where it was listed in sixth position (and later on in second); and XXL, where it was listed in fifth.

== Recording and production ==
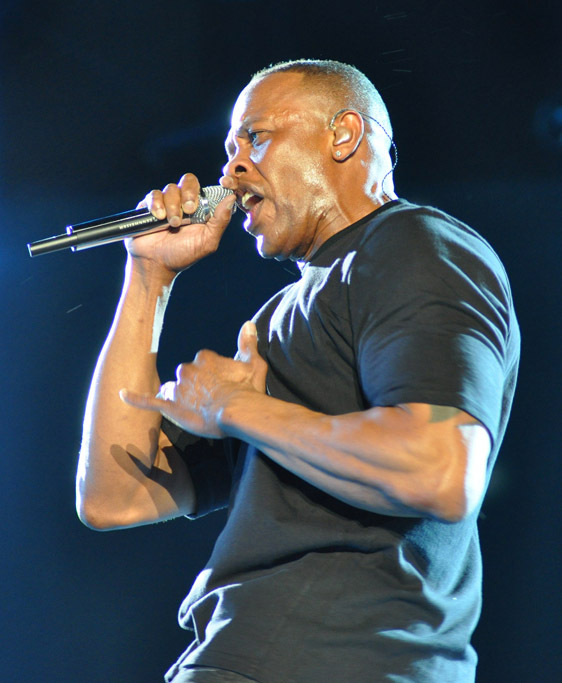
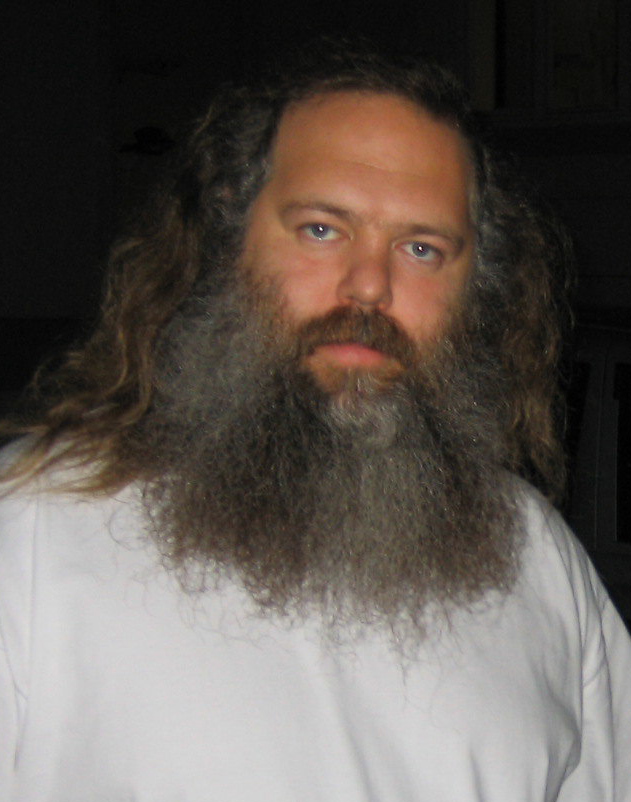
Dr. Dre (left) and Rick Rubin (right) served as the album's executive producers.

On June 17, 2013, producer S1 told Hip Hop Weekly: "I've been working on Eminem's new album and I'm very excited about that." The track list reveal showed "Bad Guy" as the opening track, and S1 confirmed that he and vocalist Sarah Jaffe, one half of S1's duo The Dividends, are featured on the song. He also credited Aussie M-Phazes and Streetrunner as co-producers. M-Phazes himself confirmed this in an October 2013 interview.

Tim Riley, vice president of music affairs at Activision Blizzard, explained to Billboard in August 2013 that he was contacted by Eminem's manager Rosenberg in March to partner Eminem with Call of Duty: Ghosts. In June, Riley and members of his team flew to Detroit to meet Eminem and Rosenberg. The team was showcased a "handful" of songs, while Eminem was shown early concept art and gameplay footage of Ghosts. "Survival" was picked as the best-fitting song, but the final version differed vastly from the earliest version of the track. Over the next couple of months, Eminem turned in five successive versions of the song, each one "bigger and more anthemic sounding than the last." – The final version was turned in only a day before its reveal on August 14.

In a behind the scenes video for "Berzerk", released in October 2013, Rubin explained that he met Rosenberg a few years back and that they had discussed the possibility of him and Eminem working together. He stated that the idea of "throwback" song to earlier hip-hop recordings was an idea conceived later in the creative process of the album. He noted that initial sample the song was built around ended up not being used, and that the final product differs greatly from the original. In an October 2013 interview with MTV, DVLP said that the instrumental for "Rap God" had been in the making two years prior to the track's release. While the instrumental had been offered to rappers such as T.I. and Fabolous, the producer didn't feel the record fit their music. He estimated that Shady Records got hold of the instrumental around Fall 2012, and DVLP himself did not hear "Rap God" until Eminem phoned him after its release.

The idea of a sequel to The Marshall Mathers LP came about after Eminem recorded a handful of songs in the early stages of the creation of the album that reminded him and his friends, namely Rosenberg, of Eminem's earlier recordings; " The more I listened to it, the more it made sense to call it that," said Eminem. Eminem also wanted to experiment with "retro, vintage" sounds such as beatbreaks and scratches, and he felt that Rubin could help him "take that to another level."

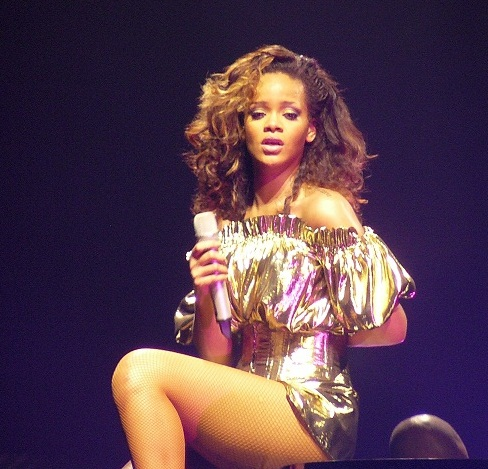
Rihanna is featured on the track "The Monster", marking the pair's fourth collaboration following the worldwide hit, "Love the Way You Lie", its sequel "Love the Way You Lie (Part II)" and "Numb".

Rihanna, with whom Eminem previously collaborated on "Love the Way You Lie" from Eminem's previous studio effort, Recovery (2010), was featured on the song "The Monster". On September 11, 2013, she hinted at the collaboration on Twitter: "Just left the studio ... Recorded a #monster hook for one of my favorite artists! And that's all I can give you ... #NavyShit". Upon the track list announcement, Staten Island singer Bebe Rexha revealed on Twitter that she had co-written the Rihanna collaboration featured on the album. Rexha recorded "The Monster" in November 2012 in Harlem's Stadium Red studio while working on her debut album. The producer of the track, Frequency, auditioned records for Shady Records VP of A&R Riggs Morales, who "freaked out" upon hearing "The Monster", instantly requesting for the verses to be stripped and Pro Tools sessions sent to Eminem. Eminem added his own verses and tweaked the instrumental, while keeping Rexha's backing vocals. The song was revealed to be a part of the album with the reveal of the track listing. In an October 2013 interview, Rexha claimed that she said "This is an Eminem record, y'all" while standing in the booth after she recorded the chorus, and that she "know[s] when [Eminem] heard it, it spoke to him."

Rapper and fellow Aftermath/Interscope artist Kendrick Lamar, who toured with Eminem in 2013, was featured on "Love Game", while indie pop band Fun. lead singer Nate Ruess was featured on "Headlights".

Skylar Grey, a frequent Eminem collaborator since Recovery was featured on the song "Asshole". In an October 2013 interview with American Songwriter, "Love the Way You Lie" producer Alex da Kid revealed that he has submitted further beats for Eminem, but said "you never know what they're going to use or not going to use." He would later be confirmed as the producer of "Asshole" and two of the deluxe edition bonus tracks. "Asshole" was initially created during a studio session with Alex and Eminem in Detroit in 2012. Grey was writing songs for her Eminem-executive-produced album Don't Look Down in Detroit, and visited Eminem to exchange song ideas and hooks. She wrote the hook for "Asshole" during the trip, while in her hotel room.

"Legacy" was written approximately two years ago during a session between Russian singer-songwriter Polina and songwriter David Brook in New York. A few months later, Polina visited Interscope executive Neil Jacobson, who, upon hearing the song, commanded her: "Don't play this for anyone. It's an Eminem record." The following week, Polina and Brook joined Emile in the studio where he produced the song and then sent it to Eminem. Eminem wrote his own added verses to the song, but left Polina's vocals untouched.

In July 2012, Eminem's close friend and label-mate 50 Cent stated that he was involved in the recording for Eminem's upcoming album and would probably appear on the lead or second single, but ended up not being featured on the album at all.

== Music and songs ==
The album's opening track "Bad Guy", produced by S1, M-Phazes, and Streetrunner, with a chorus sung by Sarah Jaffe, has been described as a sequel to Eminem's "Stan" from The Marshall Mathers LP. "Survival" features a chorus sung by Liz Rodrigues and production by DJ Khalil. On the anthemic track, Eminem celebrates his return over "breakneck, arena-rock" electric guitars and "trashy" drums. "Berzerk" is produced by Rubin and pays homage to old-school hip-hop. With samples from the Beastie Boys' "The New Style" and "Fight for Your Right", and Billy Squier's "The Stroke", the track is "a punchy, guitar-and-beats driven song which channels Joan Jett & the Blackhearts' "I Love Rock 'n' Roll" and Licensed to Ill-era Beastie Boys." The album also draws influence from LL Cool J's Radio era, while the production is more minimalist than Eminem's previous records. Produced by DVLP, "Rap God" sees Eminem rapping over an EDM-inspired instrumental with varied flows. He pays tribute to many influential hip-hop acts, but also proclaims himself an all-time best, with the closing line stating: "Why be a king when you can be a god?" "The Monster" is a "dark", "demon-battling" song, with the production that was handled and provided by Frequency. The track features backing vocals from Bebe Rexha and a chorus by Rihanna.

== Artwork and packaging ==
The artwork was revealed on September 20, 2013, on Eminem's Twitter account. The cover features a picture of Eminem's childhood home, although now the house is in a dilapidated state. It is very similar in design to the cover of the artwork from The Marshall Mathers LP; which also features a picture of the house, but with Eminem sitting on the porch, the windows uncovered and the door replaced by a screen door. On October 25, 2013, the artwork for the deluxe edition was revealed. The deluxe artwork is a variation of the standard artwork, in which the 2 is red. On the internet, there are many other covers. For example, Eminem sitting at the doorstep of the house and on the door it is written, '19946'. Two days after the album was released, the house went up in flames for unknown reasons, damaging the upper portion of the home. The house had been demolished and plans to rebuild were proposed in 2014. But by 2022, the site of Eminem's childhood home was converted into a sanctuary for bees by local bee keepers.

The deluxe edition comes with two discs, one being the standard album, and the other containing bonus tracks. The discs' artwork is designed after the Detroit city seal and flag, respectively. The album's artwork direction was handled by Mike Saputo, with photography by Kevin Mazur. In December 2013, the album cover was named the tenth best of 2013 by Complex.

== Release and promotion ==
On October 29, 2012, the "Eminem Baseball Tribute Champ Hat" was made available on the official Eminem online store, with a side panel "dedicated to the landmark Eminem solo albums," and the final date being 2013, hinting at the release year for Eminem's eighth studio album. On August 25, 2013, two Beats by Dre commercials aired during the MTV Video Music Awards revealed that Eminem's eighth studio album would be titled The Marshall Mathers LP 2 and would be released on November 5, 2013, with previews of the lead single "Berzerk" and its music video, where Eminem was shown with his hair dyed blond again.

On September 5, 2013, it was announced that "Berzerk" would be used as the featured song for the 2013 season of ESPN Saturday Night Football on ABC from September 14 to December 7, and that a sneak peek for the song's music video would premiere during halftime of No. 14 Notre Dame at No. 17 Michigan on September 7; Eminem was interviewed by Brent Musburger and Kirk Herbstreit during the halftime, and the clip, described as "awkward" and "bizarre", became a viral online video.

Activision announced on September 9, 2013, that players who preordered Call of Duty: Ghosts would receive a bonus track in addition to "Survival". The track listing was revealed on October 10, 2013. On October 17, 2013, pre-order bundles featuring a deluxe CD and various merchandise options were made available on Eminem's website.

During August 2013, Eminem performed four concerts in Europe. The group of shows featured supporting acts Slaughterhouse, Kendrick Lamar, EarlWolf (Tyler, The Creator & Earl Sweatshirt), Yelawolf, and Chance the Rapper. In February 2014, Eminem toured Australia and New Zealand on the Rapture Tour. The four shows also featured Kendrick Lamar, J. Cole, 360, David Dallas, and Action Bronson. Eminem reportedly handpicked the artists to join him on tour.

== Singles ==
On August 25, 2013, he revealed that the first single "Berzerk" would be released on August 27, 2013, in the US. The song was premiered on Shade 45 the day before its retail release. The single debuted at number two on the Canadian Hot 100, number three on the US Billboard Hot 100, and among the top 40 in many other countries. On September 9, 2013, the music video for "Berzerk" premiered on Vevo. The video featured cameo appearances from Kendrick Lamar, Kid Rock, Slaughterhouse, Mr. Porter, Yelawolf, Rick Rubin and Paul Rosenberg.

On August 14, 2013, a song titled "Survival" featuring Liz Rodrigues, with production by DJ Khalil was premiered in the multiplayer trailer for the video game Call of Duty: Ghosts. A following press release revealed the first single from his eighth studio album would be released soon. On October 8, 2013, "Survival" was released on iTunes for digital download as the album's second single along with its music video. "Survival" has since peaked at number 16 on the Billboard Hot 100.

On October 14, 2013, the audio to "Rap God" premiered on Eminem's YouTube channel. It was then released to iTunes the following day, as the album's third single. It debuted at number seven on the Billboard Hot 100. On November 27, 2013, the music video was released for "Rap God".

On October 24, 2013, it was revealed that the Rihanna collaboration "The Monster", would be released as the album's fourth single. The Frequency-produced song premiered on October 28, 2013. The song was then released as the album's fourth official single the following day. The song became Eminem's fifth single to reach number one on the Billboard Hot 100. On December 16, 2013, the music video was released for "The Monster" featuring Rihanna. "Headlights", which features American singer Nate Ruess, was released as the album's fifth single in Australia on February 5, 2014. "Headlights" has since peaked at number 45 on the Billboard Hot 100.

== Critical reception ==
Professional ratings
Aggregate scores
Source	Rating
AnyDecentMusic?	6.5/10
Metacritic	72/100
Review scores
Source	Rating
AllMusic	4/5 stars
The A.V. Club	B
Entertainment Weekly	C+
The Guardian	5/5 stars
The Independent	4/5 stars
Pitchfork	4.7/10
Rolling Stone	4/5 stars
Spin	8/10
USA Today	3.5/4 stars
Vice (Expert Witness)	A

According to the review aggregator Metacritic, The Marshall Mathers LP 2 received "generally favorable reviews" based on a weighted average score of 72 out of 100 from 33 critic scores.

Paul MacInnes of The Guardian gave the album a perfect five-star rating, saying, "His flows are exceptional, the wordplay is dazzling. The jokes, in places offensive, are relentless. There is no apology; no concession; just a virtuoso application of talent." Jon Dolan of Rolling Stone said, "Nostalgia is everywhere. … He's playing his best character, the demon spawn of Trailer Hell, America, hitting middle age with his middle finger up his nose while he cleans off the Kool-Aid his kids spilled on the couch". Christopher Weingarten of Spin stated, "If rapping were purely an athletic competition, Eminem would be Michael Phelps and Lou Retton combined: pure ability and flexibility, like a bullet with only white-hot hate in his wake". He would go on to add that "we get rhymes… more rhymes than some rappers manage in a whole career". Mikael Wood of the Los Angeles Times said, "Eminem sounds more alive – angrier yet fully present – than he has in years… Eminem burns with purpose on "MMLP2". And if you don't like what he (still) has to say, there's a chance he doesn't either".

Edna Gundersen of USA Today said that Eminem "recaptures the original release's wild, clever, emotional brilliance in a flurry of caustic, brazenly honest, rapid-fire rhymes and aggressive beats". Sarah Rodman of The Boston Globe gave the album a positive review saying, "If anything, the sequel is more intense than the original, as the Detroit rapper explodes like an M-80..... many memorable ones to be heard here, as Eminem doubles down on his manic flow, bursting with analogies, jokes, allusions, and ingenious wordplay with dizzying speed and skill". Dan Rys of XXL gave the album a rating of XL saying, "the thing that carries Em through is the diversity of his flows, and his ability to rap over anything ..... you're getting one with more perspective, a version which has seen 13 more years and has a different outlook on some of the same topics that he first visited in 2000". Evan Rytlewski of The A.V. Club gave the album a B rating, saying "after years of stagnancy and tedious anger, he shows real growth on The Marshall Mathers LP. Eminem has always rapped with forceful determination out of compulsive drives to prove himself to doubters, cut down his enemies, and retain his commercial foothold. For the first time in far too long, he sounds like he's rapping because he enjoys it, too." Jon Carmanica of The New York Times gave the album a positive review saying, "His lyrics are best viewed under a microscope..... to see how he gets from one rhyme to the next in unexpected ways..... he'll dominate almost any sound..... but he still has some old habits, still heavy-handed with homophobic slurs..... Eminem is still rapping from deep inside his cave, as if he's had no new experiences to draw from." David Jeffries of AllMusic spoke of the album saying, it is a "vicious, infectious, hilarious triumph..... a super villain so familiar with hate and depression, he's powered by all shades of anger ..... most of the best moments on MMLP2 are just as angry and just as irresponsible..... Eminem at his very best." Luke Fox of Exclaim! rated the album 8/10, praising its "astounding wordplay and creative beat choices".

In a mixed review, Greg Kot of the Chicago Tribune gave the album two out of four stars saying, "it reaffirms his prodigious agility with rhymes. Eminem still crunches together syllables, silliness, and storytelling flights of ridiculousness with acrobatic skill" and "The sense that we've all been here before, twice, is exacerbated by tired samples and interpolations. Eminem tries to cover up his retreat by doing cartwheels and back-flips with his rhymes". Craig Jenkins of Pitchfork gave the album a mixed review saying, "Eminem is a titan with wordplay, but MMLP2 once again finds him at a loss for how to apply his talents." Nick Catucci of Entertainment Weekly gave the album a C+ criticizing Eminem's use of slurs on the album, saying "Eminem wouldn't be Eminem..... if he didn't allot some of his whizbang homophobic slurs and misogynistic fantasies..... rightly considered a rap great for his technical prowess, wicked humor, and tenacity..... which make his flashes of hatred for women and gay men all the more alarming."

Retrospectively, in a 2024 ranking of Eminem's 12 studio albums, Damien Scott of Billboard magazine placed The Marshall Mathers LP 2 second to last. Although Scott highlighted the tracks "Berzerk" and "The Monster", he concluded that "overall, the album failed to live up to the creative heights of the original and lacked the intense clarity of focus of Recovery".

=== Accolades ===
Closing out the year, The Marshall Mathers LP 2 was ranked in multiple "Albums of the Year" lists. XXL named it the second best album of the year. They commented saying, "Three years after his widely praised album Recovery, Em tapped into his former self for Marshall Mathers LP 2. Slim Shady, along with the characters and stories from the first installment, are peppered throughout his latest effort. The Rap God also displays his lyrical prowess on songs like 'Love Game' with Kendrick Lamar, the tribute to his mother in 'Headlights', and the old school rap-rock ode 'Berzerk'. Em also supplies the world with another Rihanna collaboration that ups the expectations for fans every time their name is paired together. Overall, Eminem proves once again that his second wind is just as good as his glory days." Complex ranked the album number six, on their list of the 50 best albums of 2013, praising it as Eminem's best album since The Eminem Show. Music critic Robert Christgau named it the seventh best album of 2013 in his year-end list for The Barnes & Noble Review. Digital Spy placed it at number 14 on their list of the best albums of 2013. It was placed at number 24 on Rolling Stone's list of the 50 best albums of 2013. Spin also ranked it at number 28 on their list of the 50 best albums of 2013, saying "His eighth solo album, The Marshall Mathers LP 2, is an unwieldy beast; an imperfect yet mostly thrilling verbal-gymnastics routine that sticks the landing in the zone of Bad Taste with arms proudly raised." It was also listed at number 48 on the PopMatters list of the best albums of 2013. It was positioned at number 64 on musicOMH's list of the top 100 of the year.

Year	Publication	Rank	Country	List
2013	musicOMH	64	Canada	Top 100 Albums of 2013
2013	XXL	2	United States	The 25 Best Albums of 2013
2013	Complex	6	United States	The 50 Best Albums of 2013
2013	Digital Spy	14	United States	Digital Spy's top albums of 2013
2013	Rolling Stone	24	United States	50 Best Albums of 2013
2013	Rolling Stone	4	United States	25 Best Hip-Hop Albums of 2013
2013	Spin	28	United States	Spin's 50 Best Albums of 2013
2013	Spin	7	United States	Spin's 40 Best Hip-Hop Albums of 2013
2013	PopMatters	48	United States	The 75 Best Albums of 2013
2014	The Barnes & Noble Review	7	United States	The 2013 Dean's List

Year	Ceremony	Category	Result
2014	Billboard Music Awards	Top Billboard 200 Album	Nominated
2014	Billboard Music Awards	Top Rap Album	Won
2014	BET Hip Hop Awards	Album of the Year	Nominated
2015	Grammy Awards	Best Rap Album	Won
2015	Billboard Music Awards	Top Rap Album	Nominated

== Commercial performance ==
In the United States, the album debuted at No. 1 on the Billboard 200, selling more than 792,000 copies in its first week, becoming the second-biggest debut of 2013 and the second-largest sales week of the year, only behind the debut of Justin Timberlake's The 20/20 Experience, which bowed at number one with 968,000 in March. The Marshall Mathers LP 2 logs the sixth-biggest sales week of the past five years. The album also marks Eminem's seventh No. 1 album. In its second week the album dropped to number two, selling 210,000 more copies. In its third week the album returned to number one on the Billboard 200, selling 120,000 more copies. In its fourth week the album dropped to number two on the Billboard 200, selling 199,000 more copies. The album sold 1,727,000 copies in the United States in 2013, making it the second best-selling album of the year. As of April 2015, the album has sold 2,244,000 copies in the United States according to Nielsen Soundscan. As of November 2016, the album hit 3.3 million of copies in the United States.In 2013, The Marshall Mathers LP 2 was ranked as the 16th most popular album of the year on the Billboard 200.The following year, The Marshall Mathers LP 2 was ranked as the fifth most popular album of 201.

The Marshall Mathers Lp 2 sold one million copies worldwide in its first week and the album was streamed 10 million times on Spotify in its debut week.The Marshall Mathers LP 2 finished 2013 with 3.8 million copies sold worldwide. As of March 2014, the album sold 4 million copies worldwide.

In the United Kingdom, the album debuted at number one on the UK Albums Chart, selling over 143,000 copies, becoming Eminem's seventh consecutive No. 1 album in the UK. By achieving such a feat, Eminem became the first American act to score seven consecutive UK Number 1 albums and is now on par with The Beatles in second place for the most chart-topping UK albums in a row. The album was the best-selling album of 2013 in Canada, with over 242,000 units sold. In Australia, the album debuted at atop the ARIA Albums Chart, with only three days of chart sales, becoming his seventh No. 1 album in the country. It remained at number-one on the ARIA Albums Chart in its second week.

== Track listing ==
Standard edition
No.	Title	Writer(s)	Producer(s)	Length
1.	"Bad Guy"	Marshall Mathers; Larry Griffin; Mark Landon; Sarah Jaffe; Nicholas Warwar; Vincent Venditto; Stephen Hacker; Michael Aiello; Walter Murphy; Gian Reverberi; Laura Giordano	S1; M-Phazes; Streetrunner; Vincent Venditto^{[a]}	7:14
2.	"Parking Lot" (skit)	Mathers	Eminem	0:55
3.	"Rhyme or Reason"	Mathers; Rod Argent	Rick Rubin; Eminem	5:01
4.	"So Much Better"	Mathers; Luis Resto	Eminem; Resto^{[b]}	4:21
5.	"Survival"	Mathers; Khalil Abdul Rahman; Erik Alcock; Liz Rodrigues; Pranam Injeti; Mike Strange	DJ Khalil	4:32
6.	"Legacy"	Mathers; Polina Goudieva; David Brook; Emile Haynie	Emile	4:56
7.	"Asshole" (featuring Skylar Grey)	Mathers; Alexander Grant; Holly Hafermann; Resto	Alex da Kid; Eminem^{[b]}	4:48
8.	"Berzerk"	Mathers; William Squier; Adam Horovitz; Adam Yauch; Rick Rubin; Joseph Modeliste; Arthur Neville; Cyril Neville; Leo Nocentelli; George Porter Jr.; Anthony Criss; Vincent Brown; Keir Gist	Rick Rubin	3:58
9.	"Rap God"	Mathers; Bigram Zayas; Matthew "Filthy" Delgiorno; Hacker; Douglas Davis; Richard Walters; Dania Birks; Juana Burns; Juanita Lee; Fatima Shaheed; Kim Nazel	DVLP; Filthy^{[a]}	6:03
10.	"Brainless"	Mathers; Resto	Eminem; Resto^{[b]}	4:46
11.	"Stronger Than I Was"	Mathers; Resto	Eminem; Resto^{[b]}	5:36
12.	"The Monster" (featuring Rihanna)	Mathers; Robyn Fenty; Bryan "Frequency" Fryzel; Aaron Kleinstub; Maki Athanasiou; Jon Bellion; Bebe Rexha	Frequency; Aalias^{[a]}	4:10
13.	"So Far..."	Mathers; Joe Walsh; Schoolly D	Rick Rubin	5:17
14.	"Love Game" (featuring Kendrick Lamar)	Mathers; Kendrick Duckworth; Clint Ballard; Jimmie Grier; Coy Poe; Pinky Tomlin	Rick Rubin	4:56
15.	"Headlights" (featuring Nate Ruess)	Mathers; Nate Ruess; Haynie; Jeff Bhasker; Resto	Emile; Jeff Bhasker; Eminem^{[b]}	5:43
16.	"Evil Twin"	Mathers; Tavish Graham; Joey Chavez; Resto; Wolfgang Düren	Sid Roams; Eminem^{[b]}	7:33
Total length:				79:49

Call of Duty: Ghosts bonus track
No.	Title	Writer(s)	Producer(s)	Length
17.	"Don't Front" (featuring Buckshot)	Mathers; Kenyatta Blake	Katalyst	4:44
Total length:				82:57

Deluxe edition disc two
No.	Title	Writer(s)	Producer(s)	Length
1.	"Baby"	Mathers; Resto; Strange	Eminem; Resto^{[b]}	4:23
2.	"Desperation" (featuring Jamie N Commons)	Mathers; Jamie Commons; Grant	Alex da Kid	3:56
3.	"Groundhog Day"	Mathers; Carl "Cardiak" McCormick; Adam Feeney; Thomas Brenneck; Jared Tankel; Homer Steinweiss; David Guy; Leon Michels	Cardiak; Frank Dukes; Eminem^{[a]}	4:53
4.	"Beautiful Pain" (featuring Sia)	Mathers; Haynie; Sia Furler; Resto	Emile; Eminem^{[a]}	4:25
5.	"Wicked Ways" (featuring X Ambassadors)	Mathers; Grant; Josh Mosser	Alex da Kid	6:32
Total length:				24:09

Notes

- Track listing and credits from album booklet.
- ^{^a} signifies a co-producer
- ^{^b} signifies an additional producer
- "Bad Guy"'s refrain contains vocals by Sarah Jaffe.
- "Survival" contains vocals by Liz Rodrigues.
- "Legacy" contains vocals by Polina.
- "Love Game" contains vocals by Keira Marie.
- "The Monster" contains background vocals by Bebe Rexha.
- The skit from the song "Evil Twin" was not included in the song for the deluxe and 10th anniversary editions as it was added to the song "Wicked Ways".
- 10th anniversary edition includes the instrumentals of "Survival", "Berzerk", "The Monster", "Rap God", "Headlights" and the bonus track "Don't Front" featuring Buckshot.

Sample credits

- "Bad Guy" contains samples of "Hocus Pokus", as performed by Walter Murphy; "Soana", written by Gian Piero Reverberi and Laura Giordano; and "Ode to Billie Joe", as performed by Lou Donaldson.
- "Rhyme or Reason" contains samples of "Time of the Season", written by Rod Argent and performed by The Zombies.
- "Berzerk" contains samples of "The Stroke", written and performed by Billy Squier; "Fight for Your Right", written by Adam Horovitz, Adam Yauch and Rick Rubin, as performed by the Beastie Boys; and "Feel Me Flow", written by Joseph Modeliste, Art Neville, Cyril Neville, Leo Nocentelli, George Porter Jr., Anthony Criss, Vincent Brown, and Keir Gist, as performed by Naughty by Nature.
- "Rap God" contains samples of "The Show", written by Douglas Davis and Richard Walters, and "Supersonic", written by Dania Birks, Juana Burns, Jaunita Lee, Fatima Shaheed, and Kim Nazel.
- "So Far..." contains samples of "Life's Been Good", written and performed by Joe Walsh; and "P.S.K. What Does It Mean?", as performed by Schoolly D.
- "Love Game" contains samples of "Game of Love", written by Clint Ballard, Jr., as performed by Wayne Fontana & The Mindbenders; and samples of "The Object of My Affection", written by Jimmie Grier, Coy Poe and Pinky Tomlin.
- "Evil Twin" contains samples of "The Reunion", written by Marshall Mathers, Ryan Montgomery, Luis Resto, Joey Chavez, Tavish Graham, Andre Young, Mark Batson, Dawaun Parker, Trevor Lawrence, Mike Elizondo and Sean Cruse as performed by Bad Meets Evil; and "Eyeless Dream" written and performed by Wolfgang Düren.
- "Groundhog Day" contains samples of "Sleight of Hand" written by Thomas Brenneck, Jared Tankel, Homer Steinweiss, Dave Guy and Leon Michels as performed by Menahan Street Band; and from the Sam Kinison recording "Big Menu".

== Personnel ==
Credits for The Marshall Mathers LP 2 adapted from AllMusic.

- Aalias – producer
- Erik Alcock – guitar
- Maurice "Malex" Alexander – vocal engineer
- Maki Athanasiou – instrumentation
- Bebe Rexha – background vocals
- Jeff Bhasker – producer
- Delbert Bowers – mixing assistant
- Phillip Broussard Jr. – assistant engineer
- Tony Campana – engineer
- Larry Chatman – project coordinator
- R.J. Colston – mixing assistant
- David Covell – assistant engineer
- Dennis Dennehy – marketing, publicity
- Jeremy Deputat – cover photo, photography
- DJ Khalil – producer
- DJ Mormile – A&R
- Dr. Dre – executive producer, mixing
- DVLP – instrumentation, producer
- Eminem – producer, mixing, primary artist
- Filthy – producer
- John Fisher – A&R
- Frequency – producer
- Chris Galland – mixing assistant
- Brian "Big Bass" Gardner – mastering
- Alicia Graham – A&R
- Skylar Grey – featured artist
- Emile Haynie – producer
- I.L.O. – keyboards
- Pranam Injeti – guitar
- Mauricio Iragorri – mixing
- Sarah Jaffe – choir, chorus
- Joe Strange – engineer, keyboards, programming
- Alex Da Kid – producer
- Brent Kolatalo – digital editing
- Jason Lader – bass, digital editing, engineer, guitar, keyboards
- Kendrick Lamar – featured artist
- Ken Lewis – digital editing
- Eric Lynn – assistant engineer
- M-Phazes – producer
- Keira Marie – choir, chorus
- Manny Marroquin – mixing
- Kevin Mazur – photography
- Alina Moffat – sample clearance
- Josh Mosser – engineer
- Sean Oakley – assistant engineer
- Ashley Palmer – assistant coordinator
- Dart Parker – A&R
- Polina – vocals
- Khalil Abdul Rahman – drum programming
- Luis Resto – additional production, keyboards
- Rihanna – featured artist
- Jenny Risher – photography
- Liz Rodrigues – choir, chorus
- Paul Rosenberg – photography
- Rick Rubin – executive producer, producer
- Nate Ruess – featured artist
- S1 – producer
- Jason Sangerman – marketing
- Mike Saputo – art direction, design
- Les Scurry – production coordination
- Sid Roams – producer
- Manny Smith – A&R
- Mike Strange – engineer, guitar, bass, mixing
- Streetrunner – producer
- Vinny Venditto – producer

== Charts ==
=== Weekly charts ===
Chart (2013–14)	Peak position
Australian Albums (ARIA)	1
Austrian Albums (Ö3 Austria)	1
Belgian Albums (Ultratop Flanders)	1
Belgian Albums (Ultratop Wallonia)	5
Canadian Albums (Billboard)	1
Croatian International Albums (HDU)	4
Czech Albums (ČNS IFPI)	26
Danish Albums (Hitlisten)	3
Dutch Albums (Album Top 100)	4
Finnish Albums (Suomen virallinen lista)	12
French Albums (SNEP)	2
German Albums (Offizielle Top 100)	1
Greek Albums (IFPI)	6
Hungarian Albums (MAHASZ)	21
Irish Albums (IRMA)	1
Italian Albums (FIMI)	2
Japanese Albums (Oricon)	10
Mexican Albums (AMPROFON)	36
New Zealand Albums (RMNZ)	1
Norwegian Albums (VG-lista)	1
Polish Albums (ZPAV)	2
Portuguese Albums (AFP)	10
Scottish Albums (Official Charts)	1
South African Albums (RISA)	11
South Korean Albums (Circle)	12
South Korean Albums (Circle) Deluxe edition	7
South Korean International Albums (Circle)	4
South Korean International Albums (Circle) Deluxe edition	1
Spanish Albums (Promusicae)	9
Swedish Albums (Sverigetopplistan)	2
Swiss Albums (Romandie)	1
Swiss Albums (Schweizer Hitparade)	1
Taiwan International Albums (G-Music)	3
UK Albums (Official Charts)	1
UK R&B Albums (Official Charts)	1
US Billboard 200	1
US Top Rap Albums (Billboard)	1
US Top R&B/Hip-Hop Albums (Billboard)	1
US Top Catalog Albums (Billboard)	12
US Vinyl Albums (Billboard)	4

=== Year-end charts ===
Chart (2013)	Position
Australian Albums (ARIA)	8
Australian Hip Hop and R&B Albums (ARIA)	1
Austrian Albums (Ö3 Austria)	30
Belgian Albums (Ultratop Flanders)	59
Belgian Albums (Ultratop Wallonia)	119
Canadian Albums (Billboard)	10
Dutch Albums (Album Top 100)	63
French Albums (SNEP)	25
German Albums (Offizielle Top 100)	13
Irish Albums (IRMA)	8
Italian Albums (FIMI)	64
New Zealand Albums (RMNZ)	11
South Korean International Albums (Gaon) Standard Edition	100
South Korean International Albums (Gaon) Deluxe Edition	19
Swedish Albums (Sverigetopplistan)	25
Swiss Albums (Schweizer Hitparade)	12
UK Albums (OCC)	13
US Billboard 200	16
US Top R&B/Hip-Hop Albums (Billboard)	6
US Top Rap Albums (Billboard)	3
Worldwide Albums (IFPI)	2

Chart (2014)	Position
Australian Albums (ARIA)	33
Australian Hip Hop and R&B Albums (ARIA)	4
Belgian Albums (Ultratop Flanders)	97
Belgian Albums (Ultratop Wallonia)	133
Canadian Albums (Billboard)	3
French Albums (SNEP)	158
New Zealand Albums (RMNZ)	32
Swedish Albums (Sverigetopplistan)	23
Swiss Albums (Schweizer Hitparade)	41
UK Albums (OCC)	58
US Billboard 200	5
US Top R&B/Hip-Hop Albums (Billboard)	2
US Top Rap Albums (Billboard)	1

Chart (2015)	Position
Australian Hip Hop and R&B Albums (ARIA)	25
US Billboard 200	96
US Top R&B/Hip-Hop Albums (Billboard)	57

Chart (2016)	Position
Australian Hip Hop and R&B Albums (ARIA)	28
US Billboard 200	137

Chart (2017)	Position
Australian Hip Hop and R&B Albums (ARIA)	43

Chart (2018)	Position
Australian Hip Hop and R&B Albums (ARIA)	52

Chart (2019)	Position
Australian Hip Hop and R&B Albums (ARIA)	68

=== Decade-end charts ===
Chart (2010–2019)	Position
Australian Albums (ARIA)	53
UK Albums (OCC)	83
US Billboard 200	66
US Top R&B/Hip-Hop Albums (Billboard)	16

== Certifications and sales ==
Region	Certification	Certified units/sales
Australia (ARIA)	3× Platinum	210,000^{‡}
Austria (IFPI Austria)	2× Platinum	30,000^{*}
Belgium (BRMA)	Gold	15,000^{*}
Canada (Music Canada)	4× Platinum	320,000^{^}
Denmark (IFPI Danmark)	Platinum	20,000^{‡}
France (SNEP)	Platinum	100,000^{*}
Germany (BVMI)	3× Gold	300,000^{‡}
Ireland (IRMA)	Platinum	15,000^{^}
Italy (FIMI)	Platinum	50,000^{‡}
Mexico (AMPROFON)	Gold	30,000^{^}
New Zealand (RMNZ)	5× Platinum	75,000^{‡}
Poland (ZPAV)	2× Platinum	40,000^{*}
Singapore (RIAS)	Gold	5,000^{*}
Spain (Promusicae)	Gold	20,000^{^}
Sweden (GLF)	Platinum	40,000^{‡}
Switzerland (IFPI Switzerland)	Platinum	20,000^{^}
United Kingdom (BPI)	3× Platinum	900,000^{‡}
United States (RIAA)	4× Platinum	4,000,000^{‡}
Summaries
Europe (IFPI)	Platinum	1,000,000^{*}
^{*} Sales figures based on certification alone.^{^} Shipments figures based on certification alone.^{‡} Sales+streaming figures based on certification alone.

== Release history ==
Country	Date	Format	Label
Germany	November 5, 2013	CD; digital download	Universal
Russia	November 5, 2013	CD; digital download	Universal
United States	November 5, 2013	CD; LP; digital download	Shady; Aftermath; Interscope; WEB Entertainment

== See also ==
- List of best-selling albums of 2013
