= My House Tour =

2026–2027 concert tour by Sienna Spiro

- World tour by Sienna Spiro
- Location: Asia; Europe; North America; Oceania
- Associated album: Visitor
- Start date: 13 October 2026
- End date: 14 September 2027
- Legs: 5
- No. of shows: 75
- Website: officialsiennaspiro.com

Sienna Spiro concert chronology
- The Visitor Tour (2026); My House Tour (2026–2027)

The My House Tour is the second concert tour by English singer-songwriter Sienna Spiro, in support of her debut studio album, Visitor (2026). It began on 13 October 2026, in Nashville, with shows across North America, Asia, Oceania and Europe. The tour will conclude in Mexico City on 14 September 2027, comprising 63 shows.

== Background and announcement ==
On 9 June 2026, Spiro announced the My House Tour, with dates across North America, Asia, Australia, New Zealand, the United Kingdom and Europe. The tour was announced following the rapid sell-out of Spiro's first US headline shows the previous year. Before the tour's North American leg, she performed at several major summer festivals, including Lollapalooza, Newport Jazz Festival, Outside Lands, All Things Go and Austin City Limits.

Presales began on 16 June, with fans able to access tickets through album pre-orders or advance registration, depending on their region. General public sales opened on 18 June. For the North American dates, Spiro used Ticketmaster's Face Value Exchange, which capped resale prices at the original ticket value in accordance with her ticketing policy.

On 20 October she anounced an extra 22-date long North-American leg, on 21 October extra dates for LA and NYC were anounced.

== Set list ==
This set list is representative of the 13 October 2026, concert in Nashville, United States. It may not represent all concerts for the duration of the tour.

1. "This Is My House"
2. "Time, You & Me"
3. "Material Lover"
4. "The Visitor"
5. "Maybe"
6. "You Stole The Show"
7. "He's Not My Baby, I'm His"
8. "Hard to Handle" (Otis Redding cover)
9. "We're Not in Love"
10. "Smile" (Nat King Cole cover)
11. "Mono No Aware"
12. "Pure"
13. "Wish I Didn't Miss You" (Angie Stone cover)
14. "Die on This Hill"
15. "Great Expectation"

== Tour dates ==
List of 2026 concerts, showing date, city, country and venue
Date (2026)	City	Country	Venue
13 October	Nashville	United States	Ryman Auditorium
14 October	Atlanta	United States	Variety Playhouse
16 October	Washington, D.C.	United States	Lincoln Theatre
17 October	Philadelphia	United States	The Fillmore
18 October	Boston	United States	House of Blues
20 October	New York City (Note: The location for the concert on 21 October 2026 was promoted as Brooklyn.)	United States	Hammerstein Ballroom
21 October	New York City	United States	Brooklyn Paramount
23 October	Montreal	Canada	L'Olympia
25 October	Toronto	Canada	History
27 October	Chicago	United States	Riviera Theatre
28 October	Minneapolis	United States	First Avenue
30 October	Englewood	United States	Gothic Theatre
31 October	Salt Lake City	United States	The Complex
2 November	Seattle	United States	The Showbox
4 November	Vancouver	Canada	Vogue Theatre
5 November	Vancouver	Canada	Vogue Theatre
7 November	Portland	United States	Crystal Ballroom
9 November	San Francisco	United States	The Castro
10 November	Los Angeles	United States	The Wiltern
12 November	Los Angeles	United States	Orpheum Theatre

List of 2027 concerts, showing date, city, country and venue
Date (2027)	City	Country	Venue
4 January	Tokyo	Japan	Toyosu PIT
7 January	Seoul	South Korea	Myungwh Live Hall
9 January	Quezon City (Note: Labelled as Manila in promotional material.)	Philippines	New Frontier Theater
11 January	Singapore		Capitol Theatre
15 January	Perth	Australia	Fremantle Arts Centre
16 January	Perth	Australia	Fremantle Arts Centre
19 January	Melbourne	Australia	Festival Hall
20 January	Melbourne	Australia	Festival Hall
22 January	Sydney	Australia	Hordern Pavilion
23 January	Sydney	Australia	Hordern Pavilion
25 January	Brisbane	Australia	Fortitude Music Hall
27 January	Auckland	New Zealand	Auckland Town Hall
22 February	Edinburgh	Scotland	Corn Exchange
23 February	Edinburgh	Scotland	Corn Exchange
1 March	Manchester	England	O_{2} Apollo Manchester
2 March	Manchester	England	O_{2} Apollo Manchester
4 March	London	England	Eventim Apollo
5 March	London	England	Eventim Apollo
6 March	London	England	Eventim Apollo
8 March	London	England	Eventim Apollo
14 March	Amsterdam	Netherlands	Gashouder
15 March	Amsterdam	Netherlands	Gashouder
16 March	Brussels	Belgium	Forest National
18 March	Cologne	Germany	Palladium
21 March	Paris	France	Salle Pleyel
22 March	Paris	France	Salle Pleyel
24 March	Berlin	Germany	Tempodrom
27 March	Milan	Italy	Fabrique
29 March	Barcelona	Spain	Paral·lel 62
30 March	Madrid	Spain	La Riviera
15 June	Dublin	Ireland	Fairview Park
3 August	Dallas	United States	The Bomb Factory
5 August	Austin	United States	Moody Amphitheater
6 August	Sugar Land (Note: Labelled as Houston in promotional material.)	United States	Smart Financial Centre
8 August	Nashville	United States	Grand Ole Opry House
10 August	Atlanta	United States	Fox Theatre
12 August	Washington, D.C.	United States	The Anthem
14 August	Philadelphia	United States	The Met Philadelphia
15 August	Boston	United States	MGM Music Hall at Fenway
17 August	New York City	United States	Radio City Music Hall
18 August	New York City	United States	Radio City Music Hall
20 August	Toronto	Canada	Massey Hall
21 August	Toronto	Canada	Massey Hall
23 August	Detroit	United States	Fox Theatre
25 August	Chicago	United States	Chicago Theatre
26 August	Chicago	United States	Chicago Theatre
28 August	Minneapolis	United States	The Armory
30 August	Morrison	United States	Red Rocks Amphitheatre
2 September	Seattle	United States	WaMu Theater
4 September	Vancouver	Canada	Thunderbird Sports Centre
5 September	Portland	United States	TBA
7 September	Berkeley	United States	Hearst Greek Theatre
9 September	Los Angeles	United States	Greek Theatre
10 September	Los Angeles	United States	Greek Theatre
14 September	Mexico City	Mexico	Pepsi Center
