= The Voice Kids (Philippine TV series) season 8 =

The Voice Kids
- Season 8
- Hosted by: Dingdong Dantes; Gabbi Garcia (journey host)
- Coaches: Julie Anne San Jose; Yeng Constantino; Gloc-9

Release
- Original network: GMA Network
- Original release: September 13, 2026 – present

Season chronology
- ← Previous; Season 7

The eighth season of the Philippine reality singing television competition The Voice Kids premiered on GMA Network on September 13, 2026. Dingdong Dantes returned as host, while Gabbi Garcia joined the program as its journey host. Julie Anne San Jose returned as a coach, joined by debuting coaches Yeng Constantino and Gloc-9.

The season airs Sundays at 7:15 p.m. on GMA Network and is streamed through Kapuso Stream. It is also carried internationally through GMA Pinoy TV.

== Development ==
=== Auditions ===
Auditions for the season were held in Quezon City and Cebu City. A joint Sparkle Auditions event for The Voice Kids, The Clash Teens, and Tanghalan ng Kampeon was held at the GMA Network Studios in Quezon City on January 31, 2026. Applicants were required to register online before attending, and walk-in applicants were not accepted.

GMA Regional TV subsequently held a regional audition at Robinsons Galleria Cebu on February 28 from 10:00 a.m. to 4:00 p.m. The event was organized with Sparkle GMA Artist Center, GMA Entertainment Group, GMA Regional TV, and Synergy.

Dedicated auditions for children aged seven to twelve were held at GMA Network Studio 6 on June 5 and 6, from 9:00 a.m. to 4:00 p.m. GMA provided online pre-registration forms for the physical auditions; no separately dated nationwide video-audition round was announced in the cited sources.

Season 8 audition schedule
Date	City	Venue	Time	Notes
January 31, 2026	Quezon City	GMA Network Studios	9:00 a.m.–4:00 p.m.	Joint Sparkle Auditions event; online pre-registration required
February 28, 2026	Cebu City	Robinsons Galleria Cebu	10:00 a.m.–4:00 p.m.	Regional audition
June 5, 2026	Quezon City	GMA Network Studio 6	9:00 a.m.–4:00 p.m.	Main on-ground audition
June 6, 2026	Quezon City	GMA Network Studio 6	9:00 a.m.–4:00 p.m.	Main on-ground audition

=== Coaches and hosts ===
San Jose returned for her third season as a coach. Constantino and Gloc-9 joined the coaching panel for the first time, replacing season 7 coaches Billy Crawford, Zack Tabudlo, and Ben&Ben. San Jose leads Julesquad, Constantino leads the Yengcredibles, and Gloc-9 leads Team Makata. It is also Constantino's second stint in The Voice Kids after being a backstage host in the second season.

Dantes returned as the main host. Garcia joined as journey host, presenting the aspiring artists' personal stories, which serves as a first in the GMA versions.

=== Format changes ===
The coaching panel was reduced from four acts in the previous season to three. The Replay Button returned, allowing a coach to save an artist who received no chair turn during the blind auditions. The season's announced stages are the blind auditions, knockout round, sing-offs, semifinals, and grand final. Steals did not return this season due to the addition of the Knockouts.

== Teams ==
- Winner
- Finalist
- Eliminated in the Semi-Finals

- Eliminated in the Sing-offs
- Eliminated in the Knockouts

Coaches	Top 27 artists		
Julie Anne San Jose (JulesQuad)			
Julie Anne San Jose (JulesQuad)	Safhia Chanel Legaspi	Lian Faith Quinsay	Kara Gabrielle Lopez
Julie Anne San Jose (JulesQuad)	Christian Louie Pon	Cassidy Rae Cua	Georgina Khloe Lopez
Julie Anne San Jose (JulesQuad)	John Paul Miguel Nabong	Roniella Ember Madelo	Stephen Joshua Berroya
Gloc-9 (Team Makata)			
Gloc-9 (Team Makata)	Aleia Payunan	Aloha Aguirre	Nicaella Jane Palado
Gloc-9 (Team Makata)	Kielle Lobitaña	Ayesha Bahoy	Cianne Kate Atienza
Gloc-9 (Team Makata)	Jennelita Ellenaj Mimes	Sophia Rei Dela Rosa	Uzziah Kyeaiu Benedicto
Yeng Constantino (Yengcredibles)			
Yeng Constantino (Yengcredibles)	Antoinette Peñaranda	Sofia Andrea Paciencia	Calex Sofia Villarin
Yeng Constantino (Yengcredibles)	Andrea Flores	Ethan Alphonse Gaspe	Liam Rhys Jalla
Yeng Constantino (Yengcredibles)	Rochelle Dane Corrales	Sofia Gale Morco	Xiann Sky Candelaria
Note: Bold names are recipients of coach replay.

== Blind auditions ==
During the blind auditions, artists perform while the coaches face away from the stage. A coach presses the "I WANT YOU" button to turn for an artist they want to mentor. If one coach turns, the artist automatically joins that coach's team; if more than one coach turns, the artist chooses a coach. An artist receives no team place when no coach turns, unless a coach uses the Replay Button.

The Coaches performed their hits during the start of the episode with "Simula" performed by Julie Ann San Jose, "Time In" performed by Yeng Constantino and "Simpleng Tao" performed by Gloc-9 together with the previous seasons' champions and finalists.

Color key
✔	Coach pressed the "I WANT YOU" button
	Artist chose this coach's team
	Artist defaulted to this coach's team
	Artist was saved with the Replay Button
	Artist was eliminated after receiving no chair turn

=== Episode 1 (September 13) ===
Among the auditionees were Kara Gabrielle Lopez and Ethan Alphonse Gaspe, both of whom previously joined Idol Kids Philippines. Gaspe was eliminated in the Midrounds while Lopez was eliminated in the Semifinals.

First blind audition results
Order	Artist	Age	Hometown	Song	Julie	Gloc-9	Yeng
1	Kara Gabrielle Lopez	10	Quezon City	"So Easy"	✔	✔	✔
2	Georgina Khloe Lopez	7	Quezon City	"From the Start"	✔	—	—
3	Daria Martina Mayo	7	Lipa, Batangas	"Ang Huling El Bimbo"	—	—	—
4	Mary Jazzlynn Capillas	8	Caloocan City	"Shine"	—	—	—
5	Ethan Alphonse Gaspe	10	Rizal	"Habang Buhay"	✔	✔	✔

=== Episode 2 (September 20) ===
Among the auditionees were Andrea Flores, Aleia Payunan and Cianne Kate Atienza, all of whom joined Idol Kids Philippines. Flores was eliminated in the Semifinals while Payunan and Atienza were eliminated in the Midrounds.

First blind audition results
Order	Artist	Age	Hometown	Song	Julie	Gloc-9	Yeng
1	Andrea Flores	11	Pandi, Bulacan	"Who's Lovin' You"	✔	✔	✔
2	Aleia Payunan	11	Calamba, Laguna	"I Believe"	—	✔	—
3	Havina Pearl Lalamunan	11	Lipa, Batangas	"Salamat"	—	—	—
4	Cianne Kate Atienza	13	Bacoor, Cavite	"It's a Man's Man's Man's World"	—	✔	—
5	Stephen Joshua Berroya	10	Carmona, Cavite	"Mapa"	✔	—	—
6	Alijah San Miguel	12	Quezon City	"Tanging Yaman"	—	—	—

=== Episode 3 (September 27) ===
Among the auditionees was Sofia Gale Morco, who joined Idol Kids Philippines, where she was eliminated in the Midrounds.

Third blind audition results
Order	Artist	Age	Hometown	Song	Julie	Gloc-9	Yeng
1	Lian Faith Quinsay	12	Parañaque City	"Defying Gravity"	✔	✔	—
2	Xian Darren Bren	12	Malabon City	"Ngayon"	—	—	—
3	Sofia Gale Morco	11	Antipolo City, Rizal	"Die on This Hill"	✔	✔	✔
4	Ayesha Bahoy	12	Biñan, Laguna	"Lipad Ng Pangarap"	—	✔	—
5	Aeisha Denise Corpuz	9	Angono, Rizal	"Aking Liwanag"	—	—	—
6	Rochelle Dane Corrales	11	Misamis Oriental	"Speechless"	—	—	✔

=== Episode 4 (October 4) ===
Among the auditionees was Roniella Ember Madelo, who joined Tawag ng Tanghalan Kids 2 and finished as one of the Ultimate Resbakbakan finalists.

Fourth blind audition results
Order	Artist	Age	Hometown	Song	Julie	Gloc-9	Yeng
1	Liam Rhys Jalla	12	Lucena City, Quezon	"7 Years"	✔	✔	✔
2	Anfa Sabella Pabayo	11	Bacoor City, Cavite	"Maybe This Time"	—	—	—
3	Sophia Rei Dela Rosa	12	Koronadal City, South Cotabato	"Paubaya"	—	✔	—
4	Roniella Ember Madelo	10	Santo Tomas, Batangas	"The Edge of Glory"	✔	—	—
5	Zaizan Pulvira	11	Kawit, Cavite	"Pusong Ligaw"	—	—	—
6	Aloha Aguirre	12	Pangasinan	"Hawak Mo"	—	✔	—

=== Episode 5 (October 11) ===
Fifth blind audition results
Order	Artist	Age	Hometown	Song	Julie	Gloc-9	Yeng
1	Kielle Lobitaña	10	Caloocan City	"Into The Unknown"	✔	✔	—
2	Xiann Sky Candelaria	11	Santa Maria, Bulacan	"Ako Naman Muna"	—	—	✔
3	Franz Josef Valenzuela	10	Balete, Batangas	"Price Tag"	—	—	—
4	Calex Sofia Villarin	13	Montalban, Rizal	"Ikaw Lang Ang Mamahalin"	✔	✔	✔
5	Chelsy Terrago	9	Quezon City	"Patuloy Ang Pangarap"	—	—	—
6	Cassidy Rae Cua	10	Taguig City	"You Stole the Show"	✔	—	—

=== Episode 6 (October 18) ===
Among the auditionees was Safhia Chanel Legaspi, who joined Idol Kids Philippines, where she was eliminated in the Midrounds.

Sixth blind audition results
Order	Artist	Age	Hometown	Song	Julie	Gloc-9	Yeng
1	Safhia Chanel Legaspi	11	Tagbilaran, Bohol	"Rise Up"	✔	✔	✔
2	Iana Louise Lopez	11	Daraga, Albay	"Paano Kita Mapasasalamatan"	—	—	—
3	Jennelita Ellenaj Mimes	12	Angeles, Pampanga	"Lose Control"	✔	✔	—
4	Claire Andrade	9	Quezon City	"Naririnig Mo Ba"	—	—	—
5	Antoniette Peñaranda	7	Iligan City	"Himala"	—	—	✔
6	Christian Louie Pon	11	Medina, Misamis Oriental	"Secret Love Song"	✔	✔	—

=== Episode 7 (October 25) ===
Among the auditionees were Sofia Andrea Pacencia, Uzziah Kyeaiu Benedicto and John Paul Miguel Nabong, all of whom joined Idol Kids Philippines, but they were eliminated in the Midrounds. Fabio Santos joined the fifth season, under MarTeam, but was eliminated in the Sing-offs. At the end of the Blind Auditions, Yeng Constantino and Gloc-9 were not able to use their respective Coach Replay buttons.

Seventh blind audition results
Order	Artist	Age	Hometown	Song	Julie	Gloc-9	Yeng
1	Sofia Andrea Pacencia	11	Cebu	"Mama"	✔	✔	✔
2	Uzziah Kyeaiu Benedicto	13	Mataasnakahoy, Batangas	"Upuan"	—	✔	Team full
3	Fabio Santos	9	Quezon City	"Dilaw"	—	—	Team full
4	Nicaella Jane Palado	11	Taguig City	"Saan Darating Ang Umaga"	—	✔	Team full
5	Richlyn Tedlos	11	Lagonglong, Misamis Oriental	"Reflection"	—	Team full	Team full
6	John Paul Miguel Nabong	12	Claveria, Misamis Oriental	"It Will Rain"	✔	Team full	Team full

== Knockouts ==
For this season, the second round will be Knockouts, a first in the history of The Voice Kids Philippines. This round was previously implemented in The Voice Teens and the second season of The Voice of the Philippines respectively.

In this round, nine talents per Coach will compete and four of them will advance in the Sing-Offs round. For the first time since it was introduced during the fourth season, Steals were not implemented for this season.

Color key

Artist was chosen by his/her coach to advance to the Sing-Offs
Artist was eliminated

Knockouts results
Episode	Coach	Order	Artist	Song	Result
Episode 8 (November 1, 2026)	Yeng Constantino	1	Xiann Sky Candelaria	"Sa Susunod na Habang Buhay"	Eliminated
Episode 8 (November 1, 2026)	Yeng Constantino	2	Rochelle Dane Corrales	"Always Remember Us This Way"	Eliminated
Episode 8 (November 1, 2026)	Yeng Constantino	3	Andrea Flores	"A Song For You"	Advanced
Episode 8 (November 1, 2026)	Yeng Constantino	4	Ethan Alphonse Gaspe	"Salbabida"	Eliminated
Episode 8 (November 1, 2026)	Yeng Constantino	5	Liam Rhyss Jalla	"Skyfall"	Eliminated
Episode 8 (November 1, 2026)	Yeng Constantino	6	Sofia Gale Morco	"Beautiful Things"	Eliminated
Episode 8 (November 1, 2026)	Yeng Constantino	7	Sofia Andrea Pacencia	"To Love You More"	Advanced
Episode 8 (November 1, 2026)	Yeng Constantino	8	Antoniette Peñaranda	"Tomorrow"	Advanced
Episode 8 (November 1, 2026)	Yeng Constantino	9	Calex Sofia Villarin	Don't You Worry 'bout a Thing"	Advanced
Episode 9 (November 8, 2026)	Julie Anne San Jose	1	Kara Gabrielle Lopez	"What a Wonderful World"	Advanced
Episode 9 (November 8, 2026)	Julie Anne San Jose	2	Christian Louie Pon	"Araw Gabi"	Advanced
Episode 9 (November 8, 2026)	Julie Anne San Jose	3	Cassidy Rae Cua	"What a Girl Wants"	Eliminated
Episode 9 (November 8, 2026)	Julie Anne San Jose	4	Roniella Ember Madelo	"Feeling Good"	Eliminated
Episode 9 (November 8, 2026)	Julie Anne San Jose	5	John Paul Miguel Nabong	"How Am I Supposed to Live Without You"	Eliminated
Episode 9 (November 8, 2026)	Julie Anne San Jose	6	Stephen Joshua Berroya	"One Day"	Eliminated
Episode 9 (November 8, 2026)	Julie Anne San Jose	7	Safhia Chanel Legaspi	"Through the Fire"	Advanced
Episode 9 (November 8, 2026)	Julie Anne San Jose	8	Georgina Khloe Lopez	"L-O-V-E"	Eliminated
Episode 9 (November 8, 2026)	Julie Anne San Jose	9	Lian Faith Quinsay	"I Dreamed a Dream"	Advanced
Episode 10 (November 15, 2026)	Gloc-9	1	Uzziah Kyeaiu Benedicto	"Hallelujah"	Eliminated
Episode 10 (November 15, 2026)	Gloc-9	2	Jennelita Ellenaj Mimes	"Run to You"	Eliminated
Episode 10 (November 15, 2026)	Gloc-9	3	Cianne Kate Atienza	"Something's Got a Hold on Me"	Eliminated
Episode 10 (November 15, 2026)	Gloc-9	4	Sophia Rei Dela Rosa	"When You Believe"	Eliminated
Episode 10 (November 15, 2026)	Gloc-9	5	Aloha Aguirre	"Akin Ka Na Lang"	Advanced
Episode 10 (November 15, 2026)	Gloc-9	6	Kielle Lobitaña	"Kailan"	Advanced
Episode 10 (November 15, 2026)	Gloc-9	7	Ayesha Bahoy	"I Have Nothing"	Eliminated
Episode 10 (November 15, 2026)	Gloc-9	8	Nicaella Jane Palado	"Where Do I Begin?"	Advanced
Episode 10 (November 15, 2026)	Gloc-9	9	Aleia Payunan	"Bridge over Troubled Water"	Advanced

== Sing-Offs ==
Knockout round winners advance to the Sing-offs, where each coach selects two to move on to the semi-finals, totaling 8 artists.

Coaches and hosts performed "Sirena" by Coach Gloc-9.

Sing-Offs color key
Artist won the sing-offs and advanced to the semifinals
Artist lost the sing-offs and was eliminated

Sing-Offs results
Episode	Coach	Order	Winner		Loser	
Episode	Coach	Order	Song	Artist	Artist	Song
Episode 11 (Sunday, November 22, 2026)	Julie Anne	1	"The Subway"	Kara Gabrielle Lopez	Christian Louie Pon	"Natutulog Ba Ang Diyos"
Episode 11 (Sunday, November 22, 2026)	Gloc-9	2	"Hanggang Ngayon"	Kielle Lobitaña	Nicaella Jane Palado	"Narito Ako"
Episode 11 (Sunday, November 22, 2026)	Yeng	3	"Almost Over You"	Sofia Calex Villarin	Andrea Flores	"Ain't No Way"
Episode 12 (Sunday, November 29, 2026)		1	""			""
Episode 12 (Sunday, November 29, 2026)		2	""			""
Episode 12 (Sunday, November 29, 2026)		3	""			""
