= The Devil Wears Prada 2 (soundtrack) =

2026 film soundtrack album

Soundtrack album by various artists
- Released: May 1, 2026
- Length: 44:05
- Labels: Interscope; 20th Century Studios; Hollywood

Singles from The Devil Wears Prada 2
- 1. "Runway" Released: April 10, 2026; 2. "Material Lover" Released: May 22, 2026

The Devil Wears Prada 2 (Music from the Motion Picture) is the soundtrack to the 2026 comedy-drama film of the same name. It was released on May 1, 2026, through 20th Century Studios and Interscope Records. The album includes three original songs by Lady Gaga, one of them in collaboration with Doechii, as well as original songs by Sienna Spiro and Izzy Escobar, along with previously released tracks by Dua Lipa, Miley Cyrus, Brittany Howard, Laufey, Olivia Dean, SZA, Raye, Ledisi, and the Marías. The soundtrack was preceded by the lead single "Runway".

== Background and development ==
In July 2024, it was reported that a sequel to The Devil Wears Prada (2006) was in development, with Aline Brosh McKenna returning to write the screenplay and David Frankel set to direct. Meryl Streep, Anne Hathaway, Emily Blunt, and Stanley Tucci were confirmed to reprise their roles, while additional casting was announced in the following months.

In October 2025, while on tour promoting her eighth studio album Mayhem (2025), Lady Gaga was spotted filming scenes for the film in Milan. Her involvement in the project, which coincided with the development of its soundtrack, led to her recording three original songs for the album. The soundtrack was announced on April 29, 2026, by Interscope Records and 20th Century Studios, confirming Gaga's contributions. The album also includes new songs by Sienna Spiro and Izzy Escobar, and previously released tracks by Dua Lipa, Miley Cyrus, Brittany Howard, Laufey, Olivia Dean, SZA, Raye, Ledisi, and the Marías.

== Original songs ==
External videos
- An excerpt of Lady Gaga performing "Shape of a Woman" in the film on YouTube

The soundtrack includes three original songs by Lady Gaga: "Shape of a Woman", "Runway" and "Glamorous Life". A dance-pop track, "Shape of a Woman" was composed by Gaga, alongside Andrew Watt, Henry Walter and Mike Lévy; the four also produced the song. Journalists compared its sound to Mayhem. Gaga said the song was inspired by what she imagined to be "on the minds of fashion designers all over the world". She performs it in the film during her cameo appearance, in a scene set at a Runway magazine event in Milan following an exchange with Miranda Priestly (Streep). "Runway", a house-pop song, was composed by Gaga, Doechii, Watt, Bruno Mars, Dernst Emile II, Walter and Jayda Love, while Watt, Mars, Cirkut and D'Mile produced the track. It shares its title with the fictional magazine led by Priestly and opens with a brief excerpt of dialogue from the 1996 film The Nutty Professor, in which Sherman Klump, portrayed by Eddie Murphy, states: "No matter what, no matter what... you've got to strut". The third original song, "Glamorous Life", is a rock-inspired synthy power ballad featured during the film's end credits. Gaga, Watt and Walter wrote and produced the track, with Michael Polansky also receiving a writing credit. Gaga said it was inspired by Andy Sachs's (Hathaway) conflict and experience, as well as by her view of Miranda as both "the hero and the villain" of the story.

Izzy Escobar contributed the original song "Evergreen Avenue" to the soundtrack, which she wrote after director David Frankel contacted her following his interest in her 2025 track "Sunny in London". It was written by Escobar, Gregg Wattenberg and Mira Housey, with the latter two also producing it. The song appears near the end of The Devil Wears Prada 2 during an emotional scene and marks her first placement in a major motion picture. Sienna Spiro's "Material Lover" was also the first song to appear in a feature film for the artist. Written by Spiro, Omer Fedi and Michael Pollack, and produced by Fedi, it was described by Spiro as "a song about loving real things in a world of AI, and everything digital", and said that making music for films had been "one of [her] biggest dreams".

== Release ==
The soundtrack was issued digitally on May 1, 2026, followed by CD and vinyl releases on July 31, 2026. Its vinyl variants include red and black pressings, along with a Barnes & Noble–exclusive cerulean (Note: A variety of the color blue, referenced in Miranda Priestly's "cerulean sweater speech" in the original film.) and an Urban Outfitters–exclusive "chroma" transparent edition.

=== Promotion ===
The final trailer for The Devil Wears Prada 2, released on April 6, 2026, included a preview of "Runway". The song was released as a single through Interscope and Capitol Records on April 10, 2026. An accompanying music video, directed by Parris Goebel, premiered on April 27, 2026, and depicts Gaga and Doechii performing choreographed sequences in a stylized high-fashion setting. Spiro's "Material Lover" was also accompanied by a music video, co-directed by Spiro and Ivy Tellin and filmed at Electric Lady Studios in New York City.

== Commercial performance ==
In the United States, The Devil Wears Prada 2 debuted at number two on Billboard's Soundtrack Albums chart for the week dated May 16, 2026. In the United Kingdom, it debuted at number 14 on the UK Soundtrack Albums chart and at number 24 on the UK Album Downloads chart in the week dated May 14, 2026. In Japan, it debuted at number 19 on the Oricon Digital Albums chart. The album also debuted at number 50 in Australia and number nine in New Zealand.

== Track listing ==
Credits were adapted via Apple Music. The Apple Music edition includes the music video for "Runway" at the end of the tracklist.

No.	Title	Writer(s)	Artist(s)	Length
1.	"Shape of a Woman"	Andrew Watt; Stefani Germanotta; Henry Russell Walter; Mike Lévy	Lady Gaga	3:29
2.	"Runway"	Bruno Mars; Watt; D'Mile; Jayda Love; Jaylah Hickmon; Germanotta; Walter	Lady Gaga and Doechii	2:51
3.	"Glamorous Life"	Watt; Germanotta; Walter; Michael Polansky	Lady Gaga	4:11
4.	"Material Lover"	Sienna Spiro; Omer Fedi; Michael Pollack	Sienna Spiro	2:58
5.	"End of an Era"	Dua Lipa; Kevin Parker; Danny L Harle; Caroline Ailin; Tobias Jesso Jr.	Dua Lipa	3:16
6.	"Walk of Fame" (Edit)	Miley Cyrus; Brittany Howard; Maxx Morando; Pollack; Jonathan Rado; Shawn Everett	Miley Cyrus featuring Brittany Howard	3:37
7.	"Mr. Eclectic"	Laufey; Spencer Stewart	Laufey	2:35
8.	"Nice to Each Other"	Olivia Dean; Matt Hales	Olivia Dean	3:29
9.	"Saturn"	Carter Lang; Rob Bisel; Jared Solomon; Scott Zhang; Cian Ducrot; Solána Rowe	SZA	3:06
10.	"Worth It"	Mike Sabath; Rachel Keen; John Hill; Akil King	Raye	4:06
11.	"Daydreaming"	Ledisi Young; Raymond Komba; Terrell Roper	Ledisi	3:49
12.	"Evergreen Avenue"	Gregg Wattenberg; Mira Housey; Isabella Nolfi Escobar	Izzy Escobar	2:42
13.	"No One Noticed"	Gianluca Buccellati; María Zardoya; Josh Conway	The Marías	3:56
Total length:				44:05

== The Devil Wears Prada 2 (Original Score) ==
A separate film score album, The Devil Wears Prada 2 (Original Score), composed by Theodore Shapiro, was also released by Hollywood Records on May 1, 2026.

No.	Title	Length
1.	"Timeless"	4:03
2.	"Extractions"	2:26
3.	"Bide My Time"	1:12
4.	"Mea Culpa"	1:01
5.	"Dior Staircase"	1:11
6.	"Figure It Out"	1:12
7.	"If It Happens"	2:09
8.	"The Holy Grail"	1:23
9.	"Dream Closet"	1:37
10.	"I Always Knew"	1:35
11.	"The End Zone"	2:29
12.	"Satan Meets Satin"	0:51
13.	"Como"	1:54
14.	"The Last Supper"	2:17
15.	"Betrayal"	2:29
16.	"Lava"	3:08
17.	"It's Always Been You"	1:53
18.	"Fell Out of the Sky"	1:17
19.	"The Juicy Bits"	2:15
20.	"Forever My Girl"	3:21
Total length:		39:50

== Songs featured in the film but not included on the soundtrack album ==
The following four musical pieces are acknowledged in the end credits.

- "Vogue (Bette Davis dub)" – Madonna (Note: "Vogue" previously appeared on the The Devil Wears Prada soundtrack.)
- "Setting Sun" – Post Animal
- "Diskokid" – Jamiroquai
- "String Quartet no. 17" – Gaetano Donizetti

== Charts ==
Chart performance for The Devil Wears Prada 2
Chart (2026)	Peak position
Australian Albums (ARIA)	50
Belgian Albums (Ultratop Flanders)	61
Belgian Albums (Ultratop Wallonia)	15
Dutch Albums (Album Top 100)	87
German Albums (Offizielle Top 100)	97
Japanese Albums (Oricon)	41
Japanese Digital Albums (Oricon)	19
Japanese Hot Albums (Billboard Japan)	16
New Zealand Albums (RMNZ)	9
Swiss Albums (Schweizer Hitparade)	98
UK Album Downloads (Official Charts)	24
UK Compilation Albums (Official Charts)	37
UK Soundtrack Albums (Official Charts)	4
US Soundtrack Albums (Billboard)	2

== Release history ==
Release history
Region	Date	Format(s)	Edition(s)	Label	Ref.
Various	May 1, 2026	Digital download; streaming	Soundtrack	Interscope	
Various	May 1, 2026	Digital download; streaming	Original Score	20th Century Studios	
Various	July 31, 2026	Vinyl; CD	Soundtrack	Interscope	
