= Back to Me (The Marías song) =

2025 single by The Marías

Single by The Marías
- B-side: "Nobody New"
- Released: April 4, 2025
- Genre: Indie pop; dream pop
- Length: 3:34
- Label: Atlantic; Nice Life
- Songwriters: María Zardoya; Josh Conway; Jesse Perlman; Edward James
- Producer: Conway

The Marías singles chronology
"No One Noticed" (2024)	"Back to Me" (2025)	"Ojos Tristes" (2025)

Music video
- "Back to Me" on YouTube

"Nobody New"

Promotional single by The Marías
- B-side: "Back To Me"
- Released: April 4, 2025
- Genre: Indie pop; dream pop
- Length: 3:35
- Label: Atlantic; Nice Life
- Songwriters: María Zardoya; Josh Conway; Benny Blanco
- Producers: Conway; Zardoya

"Back to Me" is a song by American indie pop band The Marías, released as a single April 4, 2025, by Atlantic Records. Its release was accompanied by B-side track "Nobody New".

== Background ==
In an interview with Stereogum, María Zardoya regarded the song as a continuation of The Marías' album Submarine, explaining "Submarine dealt with the raw emotions of going through a heartbreak right after it happened. 'Back to Me' is what comes after — the breakup actually happens when an ex moves on to someone new. It deals with the emotions that come along with that. Even though in the end you may not want them back at all, in the moment, that's all you want to relieve the pain." She also stated:

"Back to Me" was written a couple months after Submarine was complete. We were jamming in the studio as a band, and the guys were experimenting with some new synth sounds and ominous chords. I immediately went into the vocal booth, and the melody and lyrics came to me faster than any other song. It felt like divine intervention. After finishing it, it felt like the start of a new era beyond Submarine. Consider it an introduction to a new world.

The Marías previewed the song on December 3, 2024 at Rogers Arena in Vancouver during their opening act for Billie Eilish's Hit Me Hard and Soft: The Tour.

== Composition and lyrics ==
The song contains slow production composed of a repetitive percussion beat and synthesizers. It finds the narrator desperately hoping and begging to rekindle a relationship with their former partner. In the chorus, María Zardoya sings "Is she all that you want? / Is she all that you need? / I'd be there in a hurry / Baby, come back to me / I could build us a house / Down across the sea / I'd be there in a hurry / Baby, come back to me." A keyboard accompaniment is played in the outro.

== Music video ==
The music video was released alongside the single. In it, the Marías perform in a house with a "futuristic but minimalist interior design". Later on, Zardoya is surrounded by patches of white flames. At the end of the video, she begins to tear the house apart and attempts to climb up one of the white walls.

== Track listing ==
Digital download, streaming and 7-inch single

1. "Back to Me" – 3:34
2. "Nobody New" – 3:35

== Charts ==
=== Weekly charts ===
Weekly chart performance for "Back to Me"
Chart (2025)	Peak position
New Zealand Hot Singles (RMNZ)	10
US Billboard Hot 100	86
US Hot Rock & Alternative Songs (Billboard)	13

Weekly chart performance for "Nobody New"
Chart (2025)	Peak position
New Zealand Hot Singles (RMNZ)	25
US Bubbling Under Hot 100 (Billboard)	18
US Hot Rock & Alternative Songs (Billboard)	18

=== Year-end charts ===
Year-end chart performance for "Back to Me"
Chart (2025)	Position
US Hot Rock & Alternative Songs (Billboard)	51

Year-end chart performance for "Nobody New"
Chart (2025)	Position
US Hot Rock & Alternative Songs (Billboard)	48
