= The Visitor Tour =

2026 concert tour by Sienna Spiro

- Tour by Sienna Spiro
- Associated album: Visitor
- Start date: January 28, 2026
- End date: May 24, 2026
- Legs: 2
- No. of shows: 18

Sienna Spiro concert chronology
- The Visitor Tour (2026); My House Tour (2026–2027)

The Visitor Tour was the first tour by English singer-songwriter Sienna Spiro. The tour began on January 28, 2026, in Los Angeles and concluded on May 24, 2026, in Paris.

== Background ==
Spiro previously was the support act on the Sam Smith, To Be Free tour and Teddy Swims, I've Tried Everything but Therapy Tour in 2025.

== Shows ==
List of 2026 concerts
Date	City	Country	Venue
January 28, 2026	Los Angeles	United States	Blue Note Los Angeles
March 3, 2026	Los Angeles	United States	Troubadour
March 5, 2026	San Francisco	United States	Cafe Du Nord
March 9, 2026	Chicago	United States	Schubas Tavern
March 10, 2026	Toronto	Canada	The Great Hall
March 12, 2026	Washington	United States	DC9 Nightclub
March 13, 2026	Philadelphia	United States	The Foundry
March 14, 2026	Boston	United States	Brighton Music Hall
March 17, 2026	New York City	United States	Bowery Ballroom
March 18, 2026	New York City	United States	Bowery Ballroom
May 13, 2026	Dublin	Ireland	3Olympia Theatre
May 15, 2026	Glasgow	Scotland	SWG3
May 16, 2026	Manchester	England	Manchester Academy
May 17, 2026	Birmingham	England	O2 Institute
May 19, 2026	London	England	Camden Roundhouse
May 21, 2026	Cologne	Germany	Die Kantine
May 23, 2026	Brussels	Belgium	Ancienne Belgique
May 24, 2026	Paris	France	Élysée Montmartre
