= All I Did Was Dream of You =

2026 single by Beabadoobee featuring The Marías

Single by Beabadoobee featuring The Marías
- Released: 12 March 2026
- Genre: Alternative rock; dream pop; shoegaze
- Length: 3:43
- Label: Dirty Hit; Interscope
- Songwriters: Beatrice Laus; María Zardoya; Josh Conway; Alessandro Buccellati; Gianluca Buccellati
- Producers: Conway; A. Buccellati; G. Buccellati; Jason Harris

Beabadoobee singles chronology
| "Sway (Triple J Like a Version)" (2025) | "All I Did Was Dream of You" (2026) | "Sun Has Set" (2026) |

The Marías singles chronology
| "Ojos Tristes" (2025) | "All I Did Was Dream of You" (2026) |

Music video
- "All I Did Was Dream of You" on YouTube

"All I Did Was Dream of You" is a single by Filipina-British singer-songwriter Beabadoobee featuring American indie pop band The Marías, released on 12 March 2026. It was produced by Josh Conway of the Marías, Alessandro and Gianluca Buccellati, and Jason Vance Harris.

== Composition ==
The song incorporates elements of alternative rock, trip hop, grunge, shoegaze, "earnest folk" and, to a lesser extent, electronica. It features an arrangement of guitars, drums and synths. The song shifts between laid-back, contemplative verses and more intense choruses that draw from 1990s alternative sounds, The first verse depicts Beabadoobee having a pleasant dream of her lover and wishing to be with him, while in the chorus she tells him to "stay or just leave me be", singing over heavy riffs. María Zardoya sings the second verse, in which she describes experiencing "nightmares" and struggling to let go.

== Critical reception ==
Annie Barber of Flood Magazine gave a positive review, writing "The track's lyrics showcase Beabadoobee's ability to pinpoint universal experiences and capture them in catchy hooks. The opening lines, 'Please, all I did was dream of you / Swimming in my mind again / Wanting to waste time again,' perfectly reflect the yearning and desire we all feel when in love."

== Music video ==
The music video was released alongside the single and filmed in Vilnius, Lithuania at −17 °C. Directed by Jake Erland and Lithuanian director AboveGround, it was inspired by the final scene of the film Bugonia. In the clip, Beabadoobee walks through several locations, including a bar with hockey players, butcher shop and frozen lake. At one point, a car explodes and flips in the air, but she continues walking, unbothered. María Zardoya does not appear in the video.

== Charts ==
Chart performance for "All I Did Was Dream of You"
| Chart (2026) | Peak position |
|---|---|
| Canada Hot 100 (Billboard) | 79 |
| Japan Hot Overseas (Billboard Japan) | 19 |
| New Zealand Hot Singles (RMNZ) | 3 |
| UK Singles (Official Charts) | 60 |
| US Billboard Hot 100 | 84 |
| US Hot Rock & Alternative Songs (Billboard) | 16 |
