= Sienna Spiro =

English singer-songwriter (born 2005)

- Spiro in 2026
- Born: Sienna Ann Spiro; 28 September 2005 (age 21); London, England
- Education: Francis Holland School, Sloane Square; East London Arts & Music (Note: dropped out)
- Occupations: Singer-songwriter; record producer
- Years active: 2021–present
- Musical career
- Genres: Pop; jazz; soul; R&B
- Instruments: Vocals; piano
- Labels: Liberty; Virgin Music; Capitol
- Website: officialsiennaspiro.com

Sienna Ann Spiro (/siˈɛnə ˈspaɪroʊ/ see-EN-ə SPY-roh; born September 28, 2005) is an English singer-songwriter and record producer. Known for her distinct, powerful voice, she began sharing viral singing videos on TikTok in 2021. She started releasing music in 2024, including "Maybe", which became her debut on the UK Singles Chart. She released Sink Now, Swim Later, her debut extended play, in February 2025. Her breakthrough success came with the release of "Die on This Hill", which charted in numerous countries. She released her debut studio album, Visitor, on 3 July 2026, and achieved her first UK number one single with its track "Great Expectation".

== Early life ==
Sienna Spiro was born on 28 September 2005 in London, England, the daughter of Arabella (née Bodie) and Glenn Spiro. She has one brother and a sister from Glenn Spiro's first wife, and a sister from his second wife, Sienna's mother, Arabella. Spiro is Jewish. Her mother is involved with Tikva UK, a non-profit organisation supporting at-risk Jewish children in Ukraine, and Romania. Her father is a jeweller who has worked with Jay-Z, Beyoncé, Gwyneth Paltrow, and the Princess of Wales, among others.

At age 10, Spiro began writing songs, inspired by musicians such as Etta James and Frank Sinatra, as well as a range of hip-hop artists from the early 2000s. Spiro attended Francis Holland School, Sloane Square for her secondary education, and East London Arts & Music (ELAM) before dropping out of ELAM at 16 to pursue her music career full-time.

== Career ==
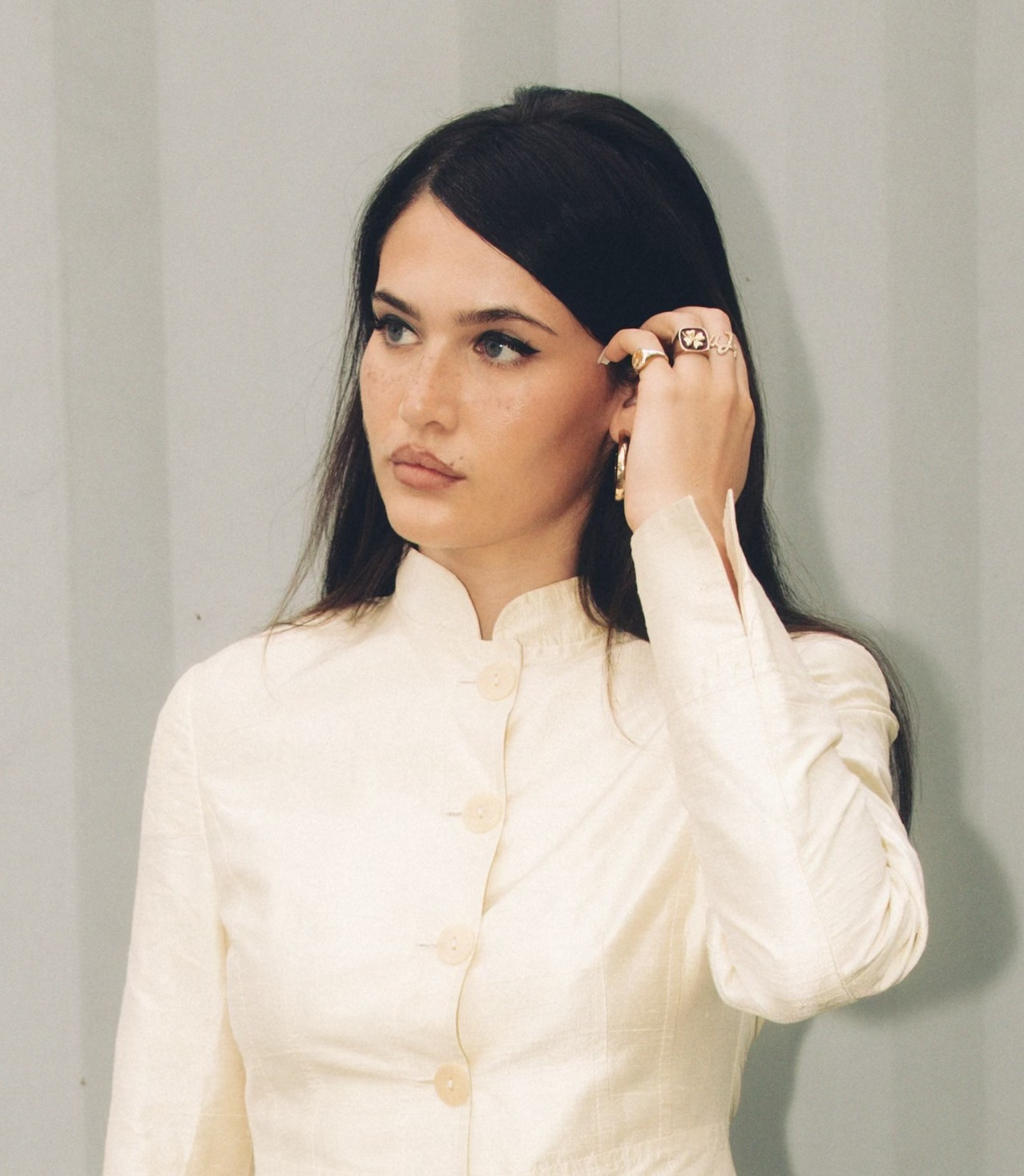
Spiro in 2025

Spiro at the 2026 Bergenfest

In 2021, at age 16, Spiro began posting videos of herself singing on the social media app TikTok. After numerous viral videos, of both covers and original music, Spiro amassed a following. She released her debut single, "Need Me", on 24 May 2024.

Spiro's second single, "Maybe", was released in August 2024. The song peaked at No. 45 on the Official Singles Chart. Later that month, she performed at All Points East festival at Victoria Park, London. Her third single, "Taxi Driver", was released in October 2024. It was followed by "Back to Blonde", her fourth single, in November 2024. After the release, she was billed a "musician to watch" for 2025 by Dazed. In January 2025, she released the song "Butterfly Effect". Alongside its release, she announced the release of her debut extended play (EP), Sink Now, Swim Later. It was released on 21 February 2025 and includes all of her previous singles, alongside three new songs.

In May 2025, Spiro released the song "Dream Police". It was followed by "You Stole the Show" in July, as well as her first tour across the United Kingdom in September. In October, Spiro released the track "Die on This Hill". It became a breakthrough track for Spiro, reaching number 9 on the UK singles chart and sold over 6 million copies worldwide. Following its release, she signed a global publishing agreement with Sony Music Publishing. She was also nominated for the Critics' Choice accolade at the 2026 Brit Awards. On 8 May 2026, she performed "Nature Boy" as part of the celebrations at the Royal Albert Hall for the conservationist and broadcaster David Attenborough's 100th birthday. In July, she released her debut studio album, Visitor, witch to date ad sold over 3 million units worldwide. During the 2026 MTV Video Music Awards in September, she won the MTV VMA for Best New Artist. She debuted on October 3, 2026 on Austin City Limits (S52 Episode 5205).

== Artistry and influences ==
Spiro at the 2026 Montreux Jazz Festival

Spiro at the 2026 New Pop Festival

Spiro's music has been described as pop, jazz, soul, and R&B. She cites Frank Sinatra, Etta James, Ella Fitzgerald, Amy Winehouse, Nina Simone, Coldplay, Adele, Aretha Franklin, Dinah Washington, Sarah Vaughan, Barbra Streisand, Nancy Sinatra, and Al Green as her musical influences.

== Discography ==
=== Studio albums ===
List of studio albums, with selected details
Title	Details	Peak chart positions										Certifications
Title	Details	UK	AUS	BEL (FL)	CAN	GER	IRE	NLD	NOR	NZ	US	Certifications
Visitor	Released: 3 July 2026; Label: Capitol; Format: CD, LP, cassette, digital download, streaming	2	3	2	16	7	6	1	1	3	9	BPI: Gold; BRMA: Gold; RIAA: Gold; RMNZ: Gold

=== Extended plays ===
List of extended plays, with selected details
Title	Details
Sink Now, Swim Later	Released: 21 February 2025; Label: Capitol; Format: Digital download, streaming

=== Singles ===
List of singles, showing year released and album name
Title	Year	Peak chart positions										Certifications	Album
Title	Year	UK	AUS	BEL (FL)	CAN	IRE	NLD	NOR	NZ	SWE	US	Certifications	Album
"Need Me"	2024	—	—	—	—	—	—	—	—	—	—		Sink Now, Swim Later
"Maybe"	2024	45	—	—	—	65	— (Note: "Maybe" did not enter the Dutch Single Top 100, but peaked at number 14 on the Single Tip chart.)	—	—	—	—	BPI: Platinum; IFPI SWE: Gold; MC: Gold; NVPI: Gold; RMNZ: Gold	Sink Now, Swim Later
"Taxi Driver"	2024	—	—	—	—	—	—	—	—	—	—		Sink Now, Swim Later
"Back to Blonde"	2024	—	—	—	—	—	—	—	—	—	—		Sink Now, Swim Later
"Butterfly Effect"	2025	—	—	—	—	—	—	—	—	—	—		Sink Now, Swim Later
"Dream Police"	2025	—	—	—	—	—	—	—	—	—	—		Non-album single
"You Stole the Show"	2025	26	93	—	78	25	52	32	—	98	55	BPI: Gold; BRMA: Gold; RIAA: Gold; RMNZ: Gold	Visitor
"Die on This Hill"	2025	9	19	2	26	11	11	17	13	17	19	BPI: Platinum; ARIA: Platinum; BRMA: Platinum; IFPI SWE: Gold; NVPI: Gold; RIAA: Platinum; RMNZ: Platinum	Visitor
"The Visitor"	2026	11	41	—	46	14	45	15	30	17	43	BPI: Silver; RMNZ: Gold	Visitor
"Material Lover"	2026	13	41	11	—	23	49	—	18	— (Note: "Material Lover" did not enter the Swedish Singellista Chart, but peaked at number 8 on the Swedish Heatseeker Chart.)	— (Note: "Material Lover" did not enter the Billboard Hot 100, but peaked at number 2 on the Bubbling Under Hot 100 chart.)	BPI: Gold; ARIA: Gold; RMNZ: Gold	The Devil Wears Prada 2
"Great Expectation"	2026	1	13	2	29	2	4	2	4	4	38	BPI: Gold; ARIA: Gold; RMNZ: Gold	Visitor
"—" denotes recording that did not chart in that territory.

=== Other charted songs ===
List of other charted songs, showing year released and album name
Title	Year	Peak chart positions										Album
Title	Year	UK	AUS	CAN	IRE	NLD	NOR	NZ Hot	POR	US	WW	Album
"We're Not in Love"	2026	—	—	—	—	—	—	8	—	—	—	Visitor
"He's Not My Baby, I'm His"	2026	—	—	—	—	—	—	6	—	—	—	Visitor
"Pure"	2026	28	63	85	32	85	40	5	142	100	154	Visitor
"—" denotes recording that did not chart in that territory.

== Awards and nominations ==
Organisation	Year	Nominee(s)/work(s)	Category	Result	Ref.
American Music Awards	2026	"Die on This Hill"	Best Vocal Performance	Nominated	
American Music Awards	2026	Herself	Breakthrough Pop Artist	Nominated	
Brit Awards	2026	Herself	Critics' Choice	Nominated	
Grammy Awards	2027	Herself	Best New Artist	Pending	
Los 40 Music Awards	2026	Herself	Best International New Artist	Pending	
MTV Video Music Awards	2026	Herself	Best New Artist	Won	
Notion New Music Awards	2025	Herself	Best New Jazz / Funk / Soul	Nominated	
NRJ Music Awards	2026	Herself	International Breakthrough of the Year	Nominated	
Rolling Stone UK Awards	2026	Herself	The Breakthrough Award	Nominated	
Rolling Stone UK Awards	2026	"Great Expectation"	The Song of the Year Award	Nominated	

== Tours ==
Headlining

- The Visitor Tour (2026)
- My House Tour (2026–2027)

Supporting

- Teddy Swims – I've Tried Everything but Therapy Tour (2025)
- Sam Smith – To Be Free: New York City (2025)
