= Runway (song) =

2026 single by Lady Gaga and Doechii

Single by Lady Gaga and Doechii

from the album The Devil Wears Prada 2
- Released: April 10, 2026
- Genre: House-pop; dance-pop
- Length: 2:51
- Label: Interscope; Capitol
- Songwriters: Andrew Watt; Bruno Mars; Dernst Emile II; Henry Walter; Jayda Love; Jaylah Hickmon; Stefani Germanotta
- Producers: Andrew Watt; Bruno Mars; Cirkut; D'Mile

Lady Gaga singles chronology
"The Dead Dance" (2025)	"Runway" (2026)

Doechii singles chronology
"Girl, Get Up" (2025)	"Runway" (2026)

Music video
- "Runway" on YouTube

"Runway" (stylized in all caps) is a song by American singer Lady Gaga and American rapper Doechii. Both artists along with Jayda Love co-wrote the song with its producers Andrew Watt, Bruno Mars, D'Mile, and Cirkut. "Runway" was released as a single through Interscope and Capitol Records on April 10, 2026. It is a house-pop song with influences of ballroom, whose lyrics explore themes of self-affirmation, ambition, and confidence, using the runway as a metaphor for visibility and success. The song is featured in the soundtrack for the film The Devil Wears Prada 2 (2026), in which Gaga also plays a minor role.

"Runway" received praise from critics for its chorus, maximalist production, and confident delivery. Commercially, the song entered the weekly charts in countries such as Australia, Canada, the United States, Ireland, Japan and the United Kingdom, as well as the Billboard Global 200. An accompanying music video, directed by Parris Goebel, premiered on April 27, 2026, and depicts Gaga and Doechii performing choreographed sequences in a stylized high-fashion setting. Critics praised its high-fashion aesthetic and visual spectacle.

== Development and release ==
In October 2025, while on tour promoting her eighth studio album, Mayhem (2025), Lady Gaga was spotted in Milan filming scenes for the film The Devil Wears Prada 2 (2026). Her involvement in the project, which took place during her Mayhem Ball (2025–2026) tour, coincided with the development of the film's soundtrack.

The following year, on April 6, 2026, the final trailer for the film was released, featuring a preview of "Runway"; the official post accompanying its release stated that the song is performed by Lady Gaga and Doechii. The track is part of the film's soundtrack and takes its title from Runway, the fictional fashion magazine headed by the character Miranda Priestly. On April 10, 2026, the song was released for digital download and streaming via Interscope Records and Capitol Records. It was also sent to radio airplay in Italy through EMI, and was released to contemporary hit radio in the United States on April 14, 2026, by Interscope and Capitol. Hours after the song's release, Gaga played it from tape during the encore of her Mayhem Ball concert in Saint Paul, Minnesota, performing a choreographed walk with her dancers reminiscent of a fashion runway.

"Runway" marks the first collaboration between the two artists. Doechii had previously presented Gaga with the Innovator Award at the 2025 iHeartRadio Music Awards. Later that year, Gaga spoke warmly of Doechii in a British Vogue interview: "The power in her words, her vulnerability, the way she rhymes with this wild mix of audacity and emotional precision — it struck me to the core". Doechii later spoke about working with Gaga in an interview with E! News, describing the experience as "amazing" and hinting that they "have more to come" following the release of "Runway". At the film's New York premiere on April 21, Gaga praised Doechii, describing her as a "brilliant artist", and confirmed that they had been working on additional material together.

== Composition ==
"Runway"
A 17-second sample of the song's bridge and final chorus, featuring vocals by Doechii and Gaga over a house-inspired production.

"Runway" was written by Gaga, Doechii, Jayda Love, Andrew Watt, Cirkut, D'Mile, and Bruno Mars, and produced by the latter four. It is a house-pop and dance-pop song with an 1980s-inspired electronic beat, drawing influence from ballroom culture. Clash described it as a mixture of house and hip-hop. The song opens with a brief excerpt of dialogue from the 1996 film The Nutty Professor, in which the character Sherman Klump, portrayed by Eddie Murphy, states: "No matter what, no matter what... you've got to strut".

Alexa Camp of Slant Magazine wrote, "Gaga's hook nods to the largely anonymous soul singers who appeared on the myriad house-pop songs that dominated radio airwaves in the early '90s". Pitchfork identified "obvious influence" in the song from RuPaul's 1992 single "Supermodel (You Better Work)", and added that it further echoes elements from "Vogue" (1990) by Madonna. Jordi Bardají of Jenesaispop compared Gaga's spoken opening verse to her vocal delivery on the Chromatica track "Babylon" (2020).

Joyann Jeffrey of People described it as an upbeat anthem that promotes self-expression, noting that Gaga sings about feeling confident and comfortable in her own skin, while Doechii echoes this message by framing the dance floor as a runway. Jeffrey also highlighted that, during the bridge, both artists reference their love of fashion and visibility. Elle's Starr Bowenbank further highlighted the song's emphasis on confidence and visibility, framing the runway as a metaphor for embracing public attention.

== Critical reception ==
Robin Murray of Clash called "Runway" a "blockbuster in every sense", which succeeds due to its "unrestrained maximalism". He added, the track "owns its over-the-top nature in every way, a luxurious, larger-than-life single whose self-conscious ownership of the headlines comes from two women who specialise in seizing attention with their every act". Billboard's Lyndsey Havens called it a catchy collaboration which is "booming with in-your-face bass and filled with the exact type of confident sass that anyone about to hit the runway would want to hear". Katie Atkinson, from the same publication, felt the song is "perfect for the catwalk". Rolling Stone's David Fear called it a "stone-cold banger", while Liberty Dunworth of NME deemed it "charismatic" and "unapologetic". Daisy Carter of DIY described it as a "pulsing, club-ready" track built around a "badass bassline" and "attitude galore".

Andie Kirby of Paper found "Runway" the "danciest" and best track from the soundtrack album, considering it a "song of the summer" contender. She further commended its post-chorus breakdowns and the "Sashay…Doechii" vocal stim. Jon Pareles of The New York Times described the track as "a very efficient committee product" by its seven songwriters, but said Gaga and Doechii deliver its well-worn theme of posing in clubs and on fashion runways "with gusto". In his review for Stereogum, Danielle Chelosky found the song's beat "generic", while adding that the hook was "fun". Kiana Mickles of Pitchfork argued that "Runway" doesn't offer songwriting that adds anything new to queer pop, and its beat feels like an echo of better tracks. She added, "It's more suited for an H&M than any reputable dancefloor".

Consequence placed "Runway" at number 26 on its mid-year songs ranking, with Liz Shannon Miller praising its "incredible bassline" and saying that the track makes listeners want to "strut" anywhere. Billboard ranked the song at number 50 on its mid-year list, with Danielle Pascual describing it as one of the year's biggest pop culture moments and praising the pairing of Gaga and Doechii.

== Commercial performance ==
Following its release, "Runway" recorded 2.96 million unfiltered streams on Spotify and debuted at number 32 on the platform's global chart. Internationally, it debuted at number 70 on the Billboard Global 200 chart for the week of April 25, 2026. In the United States, the song entered the Billboard Hot 100 at number 50 during the week of April 25, 2026, becoming Gaga's 33rd and Doechii's 5th song to reach the top 50 on the chart. Additionally, it debuted at number five on the Hot Dance/Pop Songs and peaked at number 21 on Pop Airplay. In Canada, it debuted at number 36 on the Canadian Hot 100. Although it did not chart in Brazil, Pro-Música Brasil awarded the song a gold certification.

In the United Kingdom, "Runway" debuted at number 32 on the UK Singles Chart for the week of April 16, 2026, moving 12,164 copies. It marked the second-highest debut of that week and became Gaga's thirty-fourth and Doechii's fifth top-forty entry in the country. It also entered at number 11 on the UK Singles Sales Chart and at number 10 on the UK Singles Downloads Chart.

In Japan, the song peaked at number 17 on the Billboard Japan Hot 100. In Australia, "Runway" debuted at number 90 on the ARIA Singles Chart. In New Zealand, it debuted at number five on the Hot 40 Singles Chart, an extension of the main chart.

== Music video ==
=== Development ===
The music video for "Runway" was directed by Parris Goebel and released on April 27, 2026. It was executive produced by Gaga and Michael Polansky, with contributions from Doechii, Anthony "Top Dawg" Tiffith, and Moosa Tiffith, while choreography was created by Goebel alongside Robbie Blue.

The video features designs from both emerging and established fashion houses and designers, including Robert Wun, Viktor & Rolf, Gaurav Gupta, and Harris Reed, among others, as well as distinctive footwear such as Thom Solo's Opera platform pumps worn by both artists in several scenes. Gupta described the crystal-embellished bodysuits worn by Gaga and Doechii in the video as a "second skin", explaining that they were designed to make couture function as both "armour and identity".

=== Synopsis ===
Gaga and Doechii on a runway in the music video, wearing a shared red jacket

The music video is set against a high-fashion backdrop and takes place in a stylized setting with bold lighting and theatrical staging, where a group of dancers posed in sculptural outfits perform synchronized choreography. Gaga and Doechii emerge from the crowd wearing elaborate ensembles and take part in a series of choreographed sequences, appearing in multiple avant-garde looks accompanied by dancers. Throughout the video, the visual shifts between large group formations and more focused performances by the two artists, incorporating elements of ballroom-inspired movement and theatrical staging. The visuals feature glittering BDSM-inspired outfits, Gaga seated inside an oversized high-heeled shoe, and wearing a costume resembling a teapot.

It also includes references to the film, such as a sequence in which the artists read a Runway magazine featuring Emily Charlton on the cover and a scene in which Gaga appears alongside a giant stiletto with a trident-shaped heel. In later scenes, the performers appear in voluminous, Victorian-inspired gowns while continuing the choreography, alongside other conceptual looks such as a shared red jacket designed for two performers. The video culminates with Gaga and Doechii walking side by side down a runway.

=== Reception ===
Christian Allaire of Vogue described the video as a "campy delight" and noted its use of avant-garde looks. Camille Freestone of Harper's Bazaar characterized the video as combining "high camp, high fashion, high performance, and high glamour", and compared its visual style to a mix of the Capitol from The Hunger Games, Tim Burton's version of the Mad Hatter's tea party, and the opening musical number of Funny Face. DIY's Daisy Carter similarly described the visualizer as maximalist, noting that Gaga and Doechii perform with backing dancers in runway-ready looks, while evoking the 1960s ballroom scene, Berghain, the Mad Hatter's tea party, and RuPaul's Drag Race. Jazz Tangcay of Variety wrote that the clip "serve[s] sass and high fashion". Journalists from InStyle and Attitude noted that one of Gaga's hairstyles, a yellow wavy wig, recalled her look from the "Telephone" (2010) music video.

The video was nominated for Best Dance and Best Art Direction at the 2026 MTV Video Music Awards.

== Accolades ==
Organization	Year	Category	Result	Ref.
Berlin Commercial Festival	2026	Best Music Video	Nominated	
Berlin Commercial Festival	2026	Craft: Costume Styling	Won	
Berlin Commercial Festival	2026	Craft: Editing	Nominated	
Berlin Commercial Festival	2026	Craft: Idea	Nominated	
Berlin Commercial Festival	2026	Craft: Production Design	Nominated	
BreakTudo Awards	2026	International Music Video	Pending	
Grammy Awards	2027	Best Pop Duo/Group Performance	Pending	
Grammy Awards	2027	Best Song Written for Visual Media	Pending	
Grindr Unwrapped Awards	2026	Music Video of the Year	Pending	
MTV Video Music Awards	2026	Best Dance	Nominated	
MTV Video Music Awards	2026	Best Art Direction	Nominated	
Nickelodeon Kids' Choice Awards	2026	Favorite Song from a Movie	Nominated	

== Credits and personnel ==
Credits are adapted from Tidal.

- Lady Gaga – lead vocals, songwriting
- Doechii – lead vocals, songwriting
- Andrew Watt – production, songwriting, background vocals, bass, electric guitar, keyboards
- Bruno Mars – production, songwriting, background vocals, drums, keyboards
- Cirkut – production, songwriting, programming, synth bass, synthesizer
- D'Mile – production, songwriting, bass, keyboards
- Jayda Love – songwriting, vocal engineering
- Paul Lamalfa – engineering, vocal engineering
- Alex Kalzetionis – recording, second engineering
- Marco Sonzini – additional engineering
- Serban Ghenea – mixing engineering
- Bryce Bordone – additional mixing engineering
- Randy Merrill – mastering engineering

== Charts ==
=== Weekly charts ===
Weekly chart performance
Chart (2026)	Peak position
Argentina Airplay (Monitor Latino)	16
Australia (ARIA)	90
Austria Airplay (IFPI Austria)	42
Belgium (Ultratop 50 Wallonia)	48
Bolivia Anglo Airplay (Monitor Latino)	5
Bulgaria Airplay (PROPHON)	4
Canada Hot 100 (Billboard)	36
Canada AC (Billboard)	28
Canada CHR/Top 40 (Billboard)	20
Canada Hot AC (Billboard)	22
Central America Anglo Airplay (Monitor Latino)	7
Chile Airplay (Monitor Latino)	9
CIS Airplay (TopHit)	136
Costa Rica Anglo Airplay (Monitor Latino)	7
Croatia International Airplay (Top lista)	13
Dominican Republic Anglo Airplay (Monitor Latino)	17
Ecuador Anglo Airplay (Monitor Latino)	6
El Salvador Anglo Airplay (Monitor Latino)	5
Estonia Airplay (TopHit)	19
Finland Airplay (Radiosoittolista)	91
Germany Airplay (BVMI)	27
Global 200 (Billboard)	70
Guatemala Anglo Airplay (Monitor Latino)	8
Ireland (IRMA)	80
Israel International Airplay (Media Forest)	9
Israel TV Airplay (Media Forest)	3
Israel International TV Airplay (Media Forest)	1
Italy Airplay (EarOne)	1
Japan Digital Singles (Oricon)	20
Japan Hot 100 (Billboard)	17
Kazakhstan Airplay (TopHit)	16
Latin America Anglo Airplay (Monitor Latino)	4
Latvia Airplay (LaIPA)	1
Lithuania Airplay (TopHit)	36
Malta Airplay (Radiomonitor)	13
Moldova Airplay (TopHit)	146
Netherlands (Single Tip)	16
New Zealand Hot Singles (RMNZ)	5
Nicaragua Anglo Airplay (Monitor Latino)	1
Panama International (PRODUCE)	34
Panama Airplay (Monitor Latino)	11
Paraguay Anglo Airplay (Monitor Latino)	5
Peru Anglo Airplay (Monitor Latino)	16
Portugal Airplay (AFP)	74
Puerto Rico Anglo Airplay (Monitor Latino)	3
San Marino Airplay (SMRTV Top 50)	2
Slovakia Airplay (ČNS IFPI)	54
Sweden Heatseeker (Sverigetopplistan)	13
Turkey International Airplay (Radiomonitor Türkiye)	6
UK Singles (Official Charts)	32
Uruguay Anglo Airplay (Monitor Latino)	3
US Billboard Hot 100	50
US Adult Pop Airplay (Billboard)	21
US Hot Dance/Pop Songs (Billboard)	5
US Pop Airplay (Billboard)	21
Venezuela Airplay (Record Report)	38

=== Monthly charts ===
Monthly chart performance
Chart (2026)	Peak position
Estonia Airplay (TopHit)	26
Kazakhstan Airplay (TopHit)	26
Latvia Airplay (TopHit)	25
Lithuania Airplay (TopHit)	70
Paraguay Airplay (SGP)	21

== Certifications ==
Certifications
Region	Certification	Certified units/sales
Brazil (Pro-Música Brasil)	Gold	20,000^{‡}
^{‡} Sales+streaming figures based on certification alone.

== Release history ==
Release history
Region	Date	Format(s)	Label	Ref.
Various	April 10, 2026	Digital download; streaming	Interscope; Capitol	
Italy	April 10, 2026	Radio airplay	EMI	
United States	April 14, 2026	Contemporary hit radio	Interscope; Capitol	
