= María Zardoya =

American musician

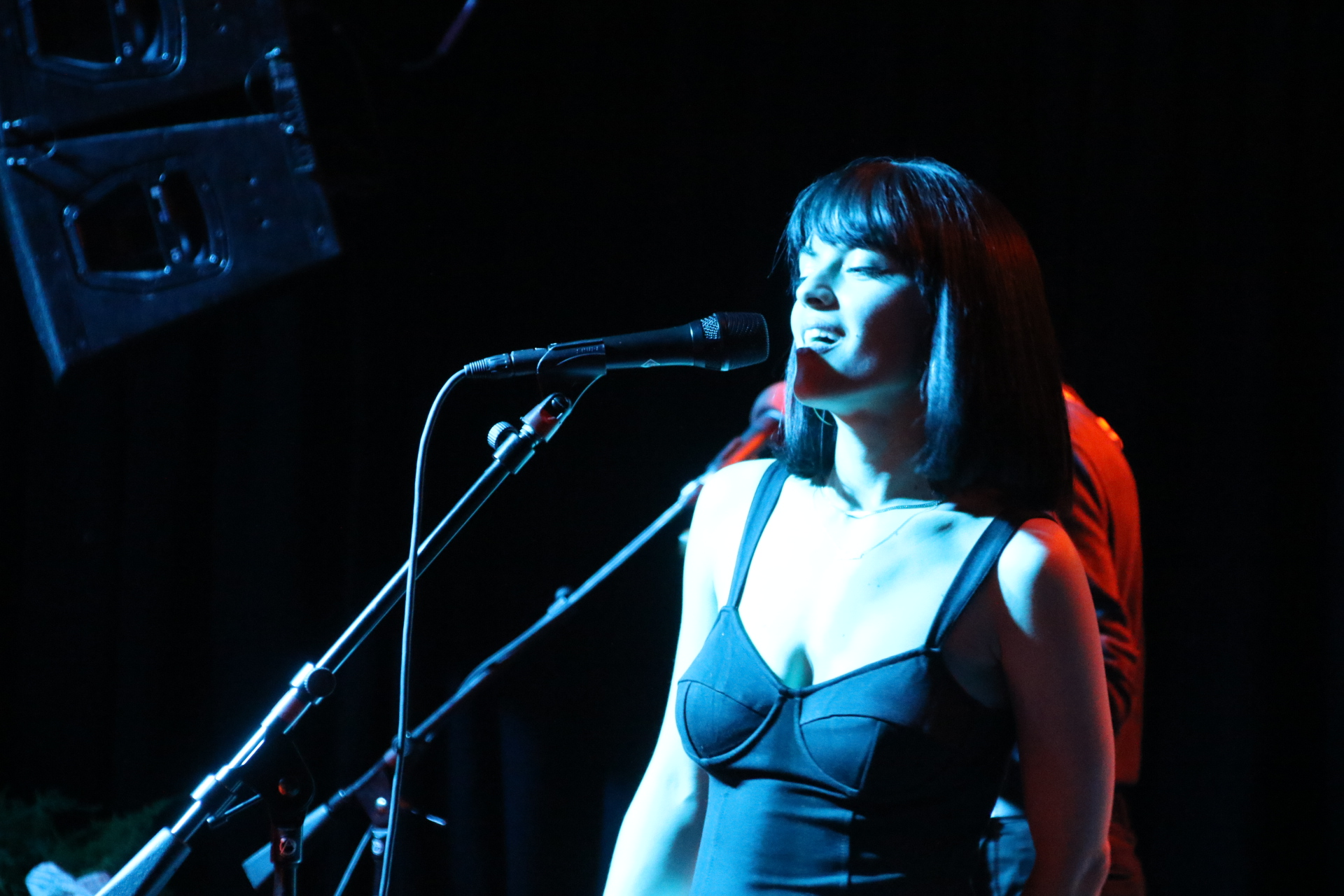
- Zardoya performing in 2019

Background information
- Also known as: Zara Sky
- Born: Puerto Rico
- Origin: Snellville, Georgia, US
- Genres: Indie pop; indie rock; alternative pop; psychedelic soul; dream pop; synth-pop
- Occupation: Singer
- Instrument: Vocals
- Years active: 2016–present
- Labels: Atlantic; Nice Life
- Member of: The Marías

María Zardoya is an American musician. She is best known as the lead vocalist of the indie pop band The Marías, with whom she has released multiple albums and toured internationally. The band is recognized for its bilingual lyrics in English and Spanish and its genre-blending sound. In 2024, The Marías released the album Submarine and gained wider prominence, including Grammy recognition, being nominated for Best New Artist at the 68th Annual Grammy Awards.

Zardoya has also launched a solo project under the name Not for Radio, releasing her debut solo album Melt in October 2025, which peaked at number 13 on the Billboard 200. In April 2026, she released an extended play under Not for Radio, Bloom.

== Life and career ==
Zardoya was born in Puerto Rico and later moved to Snellville, Georgia, where she was raised. After her father taught her how to play the guitar, she gravitated towards learning more chords and started writing lyrics first in Spanish and then in English. Zardoya studied at a local high school where she took singing lessons and sang in the choir. To pursue music, she decided to move to Los Angeles and performed in small bars under the name of "Zara Sky". During a performance at the Kibitz Room, she met drummer Josh Conway and the two subsequently formed the band The Marías. Her work with the band is known for featuring bilingual lyrics in both English and Spanish.

== Solo project and collaborations ==
On August 20, 2025, Zardoya announced her debut solo project, under the name Not for Radio. On October 1, she announced her solo project's first album, titled Melt, which she promoted by releasing three messages detailing its inspiration and teasing its songs. The album was released on October 10, 2025. On April 17, 2026, she released a three-track EP under the same project, titled Bloom, with the vinyl version containing two additional live tracks: "Comet" and her version of her co-founding band's song "No One Noticed".

Zardoya has collaborated with several other artists. She appeared on the song "Otro Atardecer" with Bad Bunny, and worked with Cuco on the track "Si Me Voy". She also collaborated with Tainy and Young Miko on the song "Mañana". In 2024, she performed "Otro Atardecer" as part of Bad Bunny's stadium tour.

== Discography ==
=== As Not for Radio ===
==== Studio albums ====
List of studio albums, with selected details and chart positions
Title	Details	Peak chart positions	
Title	Details	US	US Rock
Melt	Released: October 10, 2025; Label: Atlantic, Nice Life; Formats: CD, digital download, LP, streaming	13	2

==== Extended plays ====
List of extended plays, with selected details
Title	Details
Bloom	Released: April 17, 2026; Label: Atlantic, Nice Life; Formats: Digital download, LP, streaming

==== Charted songs ====
List of songs, showing selected chart positions and associated albums
Title	Year	Peak	Album
Title	Year	US Rock	Album
"Back to You"	2025	34	Melt
