= Sink Now, Swim Later =

EP by Sienna Spiro
- Released: 21 February 2025
- Length: 23:53
- Labels: Liberty; Capitol
- Producers: Carrie K; Couros; Fred Ball; Fwdslxsh; J Moon; Max Wolfgang; Sol Was; Yakob

Sienna Spiro chronology
Sink Now, Swim Later (2025)	Visitor (2026)

Singles from Sink Now, Swim Later
- 1. "Need Me" Released: 24 May 2024; 2. "Maybe" Released: 2 August 2024; 3. "Taxi Driver" Released: 4 October 2024; 4. "Back to Blonde" Released: 15 November 2024; 5. "Butterfly Effect" Released: 24 January 2025

Sink Now, Swim Later is the debut extended play by English singer-songwriter Sienna Spiro. The EP was released on 21 February 2025 by Liberty and Capitol Records. It was preceded by five singles: "Need Me", "Maybe", "Taxi Driver", "Back to Blonde", and "Butterfly Effect".

== Background ==
Sink Now, Swim Later reflects on the experiences encountered during youth and focuses on new beginnings and relationships. About the EP, Spiro says, "Whilst each of the songs have their own world and story, they all relate to the feeling of being on the outside. Whether it’s the longing for validation, the desire to be needed and kept around, the pressure to change to be relevant, or escaping through fantasy."

== Critical reception ==
Cody Veal from Hive Magazine gives the EP 5 out of 5 stars and says, "To call this an impressive debut release doesn't seem to give it the justice it deserves, as the artistry and talent evident in each track precedes her. This EP contains a charming array of affirmative, emotion-emitting tracks that I'm sure a great number of people can resonate with, which I'm sure makes many, myself very much included, excited and seated to see the inevitable upward trajectory of Sienna Spiro's career."

Leah Fan of New Wave Magazine says, "Since her viral TikTok covers there was an unwavering confidence in Sienna's listeners that she was destined for success in the jazz and pop industry, this EP has just confirmed it." Fan continues, "Be prepared to have your heart strings pulled on in Sienna Spiro's debut EP as it unleashes a new sound experience that you didn't know you needed to feel until now."

Cryptic Rock gave Sink Now, Swim Later 4.5 out of 5 stars, stating that "there is much to like about what Sienna Spiro brings to the modern music scene. These eight songs give a great introduction to what she is capable of."

== Track listing ==
Credits adapted from Tidal.

Sink Now, Swim Later track listing
No.	Title	Writer(s)	Length
1.	"Butterfly Effect"	Sienna Spiro; Jakob Rabtisch; Mary Weitz	2:31
2.	"Need Me"	Spiro; Rabtisch; Weitz; Yinka Bankole	3:43
3.	"I Don't Hate You"	Spiro; Carrie Karpinen	2:42
4.	"Taxi Driver"	Spiro; Rabtisch; Weitz; Bankole; Dan Gleyzer; Thomas Brenneck	2:41
5.	"Maybe"	Spiro; Max Wolfgang; Sol Was	3:55
6.	"Back to Blonde"	Spiro; James Essien; Jay Mooncie	2:44
7.	"Origami"	Spiro; Mooncie; Fred Ball; Justin Parker	3:02
8.	"Cyanide"	Spiro; Couros Sheibani	2:35
Total length:			23:53
