= Rizal =

Rizal most commonly refers to:

- Rizal (province), a province of the Philippines
- José Rizal, Filipino national hero whom the province is named after

Rizal may also refer to:

== People ==
- Akmal Rizal Ahmad Rakhli, Malaysian footballer
- Atep Rizal, Indonesian footballer
- Mohd Rizal Tisin, Malaysian trackcyclist
- Paciano Rizal, Filipino general and revolutionary
- Rizal Fahmi Rosid, Malaysian footballer
- Rizal Nurdin, Indonesian general and politician
- Rizal Ramli, Indonesian politician
- Rizal Effendi, Indonesian politician and former mayor of Balikpapan

== Education ==
=== Secondary ===
- Rizal High School, public high school in Pasig, Metro Manila, Philippines
- Rizal National Science High School, public science high school in Binangonan, Rizal, Philippines

=== Tertiary ===
- José Rizal University, a private university in the Philippines
- Jose Rizal Memorial State University, a state university in the Philippines
- Rizal Technological University, a public university in the Philippines
- University of Rizal System, a college system in the Philippines

== Geography ==
=== Philippines ===
==== Municipalities ====
- Rizal, Cagayan
- Rizal, Kalinga
- Rizal, Laguna
- Rizal, Nueva Ecija
- Rizal, Occidental Mindoro
- Rizal, Palawan
- Rizal, Zamboanga del Norte

==== Other places ====
- Rizal, Viga, a barangays in Catanduanes province
- Rizal Avenue, a street in Manila
- Rizal Library, a library in the Ateneo de Manila University
- Rizal Memorial Sports Complex, a stadium in Manila
- Rizal Park, an historical park in Manila
- J. P. Rizal Avenue, a street in Makati, Metro Manila

=== Outside the Philippines ===
- Rizal Park (Seattle), a park in the United States

== Ships ==
- Rizal-class corvette, a class of Philippine Navy corvettes
- BRP Rizal, the lead ship of the Rizal-class corvettes of the Philippine Navy
- SS Rizal (1896), a cargo ship which was sunk by a German submarine in World War I
- USS Rizal, a Wickes-class destroyer in the United States Navy

== Fictional characters ==
- Josie Rizal, a fictional character in the Tekken video game series

== Other uses ==
- Rizal (crater), a crater on Mercury
- Rizal (film), a 1998 Filipino film

== See also ==
- Rizal Shrine (disambiguation)
- Rizla, a brand of tobacco rolling paper
- Raizal, Afro Colombian ethnic group
