= Sienna (song) =

2024 song by The Marías

Song by the Marías

from the album Submarine
- Released: May 31, 2024
- Genre: Alternative pop
- Length: 3:44
- Label: Atlantic; Nice Life
- Songwriters: María Zardoya; Josh Conway
- Producer: Conway

"Sienna" is a song by American indie pop band the Marías, released on May 31, 2024 from their second studio album, Submarine (2024).

== Content ==
The song imagines the life of a child named Sienna that María Zardoya and Josh Conway might have had if they had not ended their relationship. Zardoya pictures that she would have been cute and looked like Conway. Sienna is described as manifesting the characteristics of her parents and engaging in the same things they do, such as running around, jumping in the pool and singing to her pets. Zardoya eventually comes to terms with the fact that she will never exist.

== Critical reception ==
Cerys Davies of Los Angeles Times wrote that the song was "dreamy yet heart-wrenching". Hannah Burns and Marc Maleri of Atwood Magazine both lauded the song. Burns regarded it as having some of the best lines from Submarine, mentioning "I live under your eyelids / I'll always be yours" and the outro ("On the beach in the winter / When the waves were mad / Down by the water, crystal clear / See her face in the forest then it disappears"), while Maleri described the lyrics as "hauntingly gorgeous".

== Charts ==
=== Weekly charts ===
Weekly chart performance for "Sienna"
Chart (2024–2025)	Peak position
Canada Hot 100 (Billboard)	78
Global 200 (Billboard)	163
US Billboard Hot 100	74
US Hot Rock & Alternative Songs (Billboard)	8

=== Year-end charts ===
Year-end chart performance for "Sienna"
Chart (2025)	Position
US Hot Rock & Alternative Songs (Billboard)	25

== Certifications ==
Certifications for "Sienna"
Region	Certification	Certified units/sales
Australia (ARIA)	Gold	35,000^{‡}
Canada (Music Canada)	Gold	40,000^{‡}
New Zealand (RMNZ)	Gold	15,000^{‡}
United Kingdom (BPI)	Silver	200,000^{‡}
^{‡} Sales+streaming figures based on certification alone.
