= Great Expectation (song) =

2026 single by Sienna Spiro

Single by Sienna Spiro

from the album Visitor
- Released: 3 July 2026
- Length: 2:53
- Label: Capitol
- Songwriters: Sienna Spiro; Omer Fedi; Michael Pollack
- Producer: Omer Fedi

Sienna Spiro singles chronology
"Material Lover" (2026)	"Great Expectation" (2026)

Music video
- "Great Expectation" on YouTube

"Great Expectation" is a song by British singer Sienna Spiro, released on 3 July 2026 as the fourth single from her debut album, Visitor, which was released on the same day. She wrote it with the song's producer Omer Fedi and Michael Pollack. "Great Expectation" peaked at the top of the UK singles chart and impacted US pop radio stations on 29 September 2026 as the second US single from the album Visitor. In the song, the line "If happiness is just an illusion, you are the best I ever had" went viral and contributed to the song's popularity.

== Background and composition ==
Sienna Spiro stated that the song was inspired by a time when she was living in New York and waiting for someone who kept saying they would visit her but never did. Every morning, she would expect him to be waiting outside her apartment and, when he did not come, walk down the street imagining what the interaction could have been. In the song, Spiro vividly describes the imagined encounter over tumbling piano, bright percussion and background harmonies, admitting she prefers the idealized version of the man in her daydream to the real person.

== Critical reception ==
Reviewing Visitor for Rolling Stone, Larisha Paul described "Great Expectation" as a standout, considering it the album's best example of Spiro delivering an emotionally intense vocal performance and driving a song with feelings of anger, sadness, and cynicism. In a less positive review, Shaad D'Souza of The Guardian considered Spiro's lyrical focus on pursuing an ex as "exhausting" on the song, unlike some other songs such as "Die on This Hill".

== Live performances ==
Sienna Spiro performed the song on The Tonight Show Starring Jimmy Fallon on 14 July 2026.

== Charts ==
Chart performance for "Great Expectation"
Chart (2026)	Peak position
Australia (ARIA)	13
Australia Airplay (RCS)	2
Austria (Ö3 Austria Top 40)	64
Belgium (Ultratop 50 Flanders)	2
Belgium (Ultratop 50 Wallonia)	13
Brazil Airplay (Crowley)	139
Canada (Canadian Hot 100)	29
Colombia Anglo Airplay (Monitor Latino)	14
CIS Airplay (TopHit)	181
Costa Rica Anglo Airplay (Monitor Latino)	13
Croatia International Airplay (Top lista)	8
Denmark (Tracklisten)	8
Estonia Airplay (TopHit)	119
Germany (GfK)	93
Germany Airplay (MusicTrace)	60
Global 200 (Billboard)	12
Greece International (IFPI)	24
Iceland (Billboard)	3
Indonesia (IFPI)	14
Ireland (IRMA)	2
Israel (Mako Hitlist)	25
Israel International Airplay (Media Forest)	1
Italy Airplay (EarOne)	26
Latvia Airplay (TopHit)	119
Lebanon (Lebanese Top 20)	2
Luxembourg (Billboard)	25
Malaysia (IFPI)	1
Malaysia International (RIM)	1
Malta Airplay (Radiomonitor)	1
Netherlands (Dutch Top 40)	3
Netherlands (Single Top 100)	4
New Zealand (Recorded Music NZ)	4
New Zealand Airplay (RCS)	2
Nigeria (TurnTable Top 100)	70
North Macedonia Airplay (Radiomonitor)	1
Norway (VG-lista)	2
Norway Airplay (IFPI)	10
Philippines Hot 100 (Billboard Philippines)	94
Poland Airplay (OLiS)	51
Portugal (AFP)	44
San Marino Airplay (SMRTV Top 50)	32
Serbia Airplay (Radiomonitor)	20
Singapore (RIAS)	13
Sweden (Sverigetopplistan)	4
Switzerland (Schweizer Hitparade)	23
Switzerland Airplay (MusicTrace)	6
UK Singles (Official Charts)	1
US Billboard Hot 100	38
US Adult Pop Airplay (Billboard)	29
US Pop Airplay (Billboard)	33

== Certifications ==
Certifications for "Great Expectation"
Region	Certification	Certified units/sales
Australia (ARIA)	Gold	35,000^{‡}
New Zealand (RMNZ)	Gold	15,000^{‡}
Portugal (AFP)	Gold	12,000^{‡}
United Kingdom (BPI)	Gold	400,000^{‡}
^{‡} Sales+streaming figures based on certification alone.
