= East London Arts & Music =

Coordinates: 51.5245°N 0.0104°W

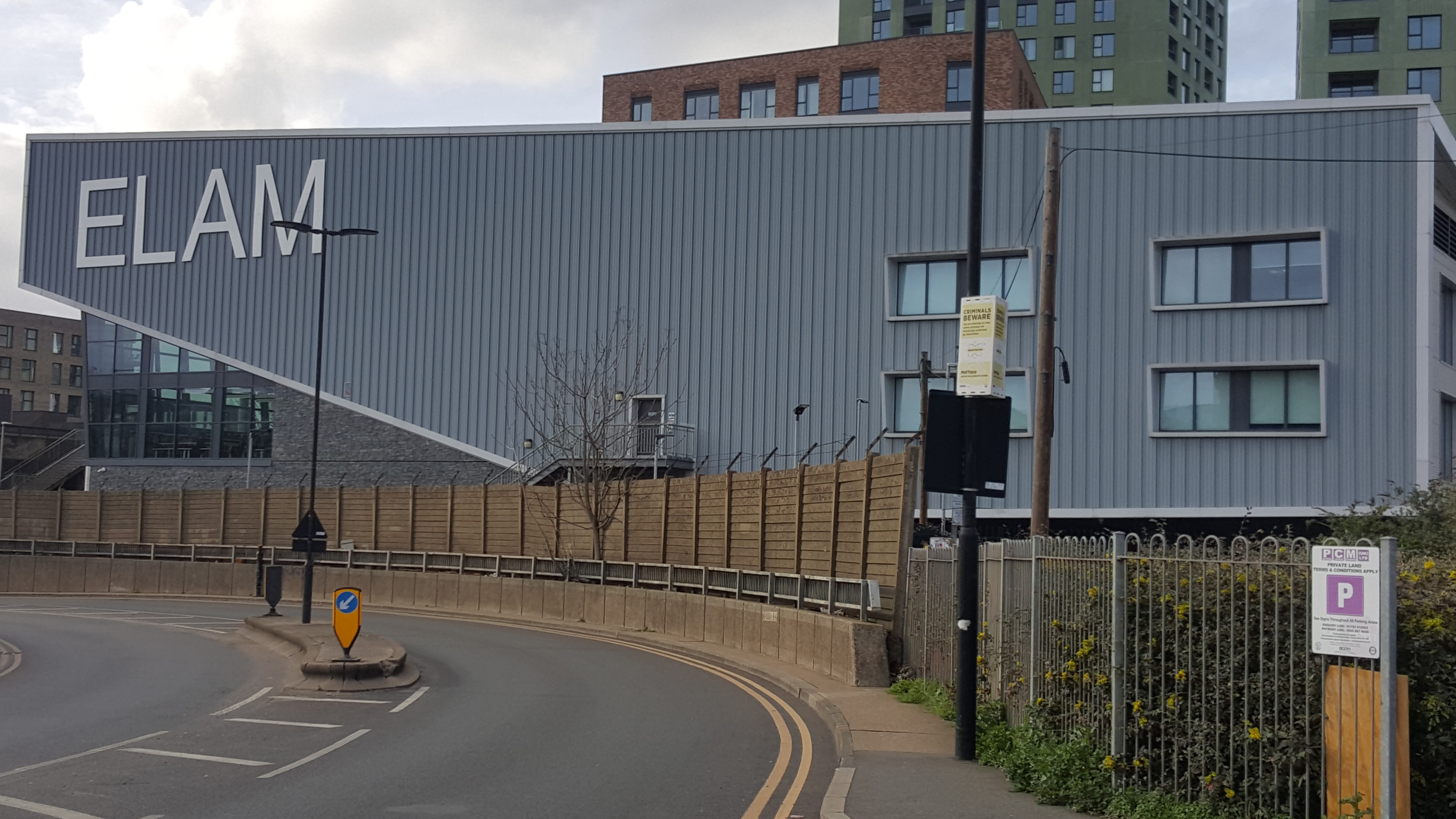

Location
- 45 Maltings Close; Bromley-by-Bow; London, E3 3TA; England

Information
- Type: Free school sixth form
- Established: 1 September 2014
- Local authority: Tower Hamlets
- Department for Education URN: 141095 Tables
- Ofsted: Reports
- Principal: Yansé Cooper
- Gender: Mixed
- Age: 16 to 19
- Website: www.elam.co.uk

East London Arts & Music (also known as ELAM) is a free school sixth form located in Bromley-by-Bow in the London Borough of Tower Hamlets, England.

== History ==
Established in 2014, ELAM is for students aged 16 to 19 who wish to pursue a career in music, games design or film and TV. It was co-founded by Chase & Status member Will Kennard and his brother Charlie Kennard, who formerly served as their principal. Charlie Kennard later went on to establish London Screen Academy, where he served as principal from 2019 to 2024, and is now Chief Executive Officer of the Day One Trust, which oversees both schools.

In April 2017 ELAM moved into its permanent home in Bromley-by-Bow, East London. Prior to this ELAM was based at School 21 in Stratford.

In May 2017 ELAM was graded Outstanding in every category by Ofsted in its first full inspection. It was also graded Outstanding in its second Ofsted inspection in 2024.

== Academics ==
ELAM does not have set grade boundaries for prospective students, however each applicant is assessed on a case-by-case basis. The course structure of ELAM requires all students to study an Extended Diploma in Music, Games Design or Film and Television in addition to English and Mathematics courses (ranging from GCSE to A-level grade depending on the student's previous achievement).

== Notable former students ==
- Ama f.k.a. Ama Lou, singer & model
- Girli, singer & rapper
- Renée Downer, member of Flo
- kwn, singer
- Stella Quaresma, member of Flo
- Sekou, singer
- Ashlee Singh, singer
- Molly Rainford, singer & actor
- Sienna Spiro, singer
- tendai, singer
- N3, grime MC
