= Visitor (album) =

Studio album by Sienna Spiro
- Released: 3 July 2026
- Recorded: 2024–2026
- Genres: Soul; symphonic pop
- Length: 33:17
- Label: Capitol
- Producers: Sienna Spiro; Blake Slatkin; Eddie Lopes; Emile Haynie; Leon Michels; Michael Pollack; Omer Fedi; Yakob

Sienna Spiro chronology
Sink Now, Swim Later (2025)	Visitor (2026)

Singles from Visitor
- 1. "You Stole the Show" Released: 25 July 2025; 2. "Die on This Hill" Released: 10 October 2025; 3. "The Visitor" Released: 13 March 2026; 4. "Great Expectation" Released: 3 July 2026

Visitor is the debut studio album by English singer-songwriter Sienna Spiro. It was released on 3 July 2026 through Capitol Records and follows the release of her debut extended play, Sink Now, Swim Later (2025). Visitor was preceded by the release of three singles: "You Stole the Show", "Die on This Hill" and "The Visitor". The album also includes "Material Lover", from the soundtrack for The Devil Wears Prada 2 (2026).

Visitor is primarily a blend of the soul and pop genres, with lyrical content centred around love, loss and the fragility of life. The title of the album is a reference to Spiro's feeling of impermanence and fear of things ending, a theme seen throughout the record. Spiro worked with songwriters including Michael Pollack and Omer Fedi, the latter of whom executive produced Visitor. The album sold 3 million units worldwide.

== Background ==
In 2021, Spiro began posting videos of herself singing on the social media app TikTok. After numerous viral videos, of both covers and original music, Spiro amassed a following. She began releasing original music in 2024; her second single, "Maybe", marked her debut entry on the UK singles chart, peaking at number 45. Spiro later signed with Capitol Records and eventually released her debut extended play (EP), Sink Now, Swim Later. She felt that she could have spent a lot of time reworking and amending the EP, but wanted a project out in the world for people to become familiar with her. Spiro described the EP as a project where she was "finding my sound" and confirmed she was working on a larger body of work. She hoped that her debut album would change music in a positive way and had the ambition to create a record that she was proud of from start to finish, something she felt would be difficult to achieve in the modern music industry.

== Promotion and release ==
On 21 May 2026, Spiro announced Visitor as her debut album, with a release date set for 3 July. The album will include all four singles released prior to it, as well as "Maybe" from her debut EP.

=== Singles ===
Spiro released "You Stole the Show" in July 2025 as the lead single from her debut album, details of which were unknown at the time. The song performed well on the UK singles chart, as well as marking her debut on the Billboard Hot 100 in the United States. "Die on This Hill" followed as the second single, released in October, which also performed well on various charts. Spiro released titular track "The Visitor" as the third single in March 2026. The song was promoted with a tour of the same name across the United States. In May 2026, Spiro was announced as a contributor to the soundtrack for The Devil Wears Prada 2 (2026). The song, "Material Lover", was also released as a single by Spiro that same month.

== Composition and lyrics ==
Visitor has been described as a blend of the soul and pop genres. The themes on the album dissect love, loss and the fragility of life, amongst other themes. The title of the album represents Spiro's strong awareness of impermanence and her fear of things ending. She added: "It's so intense that I often won't participate in new relationships or anything I know won't last, so in a way I've spent most of my life feeling like a visitor — like someone who's just passing through". Spiro accredited the album with teaching her how to savour things in the moment rather than permeating on the future. She hoped that it would help people find similar comfort in the fact of everything being temporary.

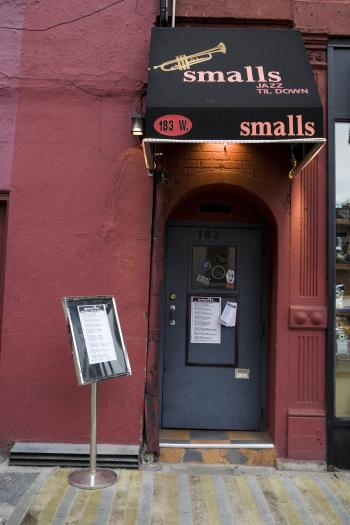
Spiro was inspired to write titular track "The Visitor" whilst in Smalls Jazz Club.

=== Songs ===
"Die on This Hill" is the fourth song on Visitor and was co-written by Spiro, Omer Fedi and Michael Pollack. It was described as a "timeless-sounding piano ballad" that showcases Spiro's vocals and lyricism. The lyrics dissect stubborn love and the feeling of knowing you should leave a romantic partner, but instead choosing to stay. "The Visitor", the seventh and titular track, took Spiro nine attempts to write. Spiro recalled sitting with a friend who mentioned an art exhibition called the Visitor, and despite having heard the word before, it stuck with her. Two months later, she was at Smalls Jazz Club in New York City, where a band introduced a piece of music about the temporary nature of life. She has admitted that she has had the feeling of being a visitor for her entire life and felt that the recent mentions had made the feeling become a larger theme in her life. She added: "in relationships, friendships, situations, and moments, I've often felt impermanent. In the back of my mind I just knew if I stopped trying it would eventually end and people would leave. After 9 attempts I finally felt like I got it right with my friends Michael [Pollack] and Omer [Fedi]."

"You Stole the Show", the ninth song on Visitor, is composed of musicality that was compared to "old school Hollywood". Spiro wrote the song about when she was on tour and was imagining the man who had inspired other tracks of hers to get the most emotion from her performance. The mindset had led to Spiro becoming overwhelmed by the thought of him being in the audience, therefore stealing the glory of her shows from her. "Maybe" is the eleventh song on Visitor. The piano-led track was produced by Max Wolfgang and Sol Was and is "about realising your worth and finally seeing who somebody truly is after being in the dark for so long". "Material Lover" follows and sees Spiro deliver "powerful, gravel-filled vocals".

== Commercial performance ==
According to Kantar data reported by the Official Charts Company, the album earnt 27,614 album-equivalent units in its first week in the United Kingdom, comprising 19,455 physical album sales, 583 digital album sales, and 7,576 streaming-equivalent albums, debuting at number two on the Official Albums Chart. Following this first week, Music Week noted that it was the UK's fastest-selling debut album of 2026.

According to Luminate data reported by Billboard, it earnt 39 thousand album-equivalent units in its first week in the United States, comprising 17 thousand album sales, 22 thousand streaming-equivalent albums (from 22.6 million on-demand official streams), and "a negligible sum" of track-equivalent albums. It debuted at number nine on the Billboard 200, number four on Top Album Sales, number twenty-five on Top Streaming Albums, and number nine on Vinyl Albums. According to data reported by Hits, it earnt 38,976 units in its first US week, comprising 17,013 album sales, 21,650 streaming-equivalent albums, and 314 track-equivalent albums.

== Critical reception ==
Professional ratings
Aggregate scores
Source	Rating
Any Decent Music	5.9/10
Metacritic	65/100
Review scores
Source	Rating
The Guardian	2/5 stars
Hot Press	7/10
NME	3/5 stars
Rolling Stone	3/5 stars
Slant	4/5 stars

Any Decent Music gave the album a weighted average score of 5.9 out of 10 from six critic scores. According to Metacritic, it received "generally favorable" reviews based on a weighted average score of 65 out of 100 from six critic scores.

== Track listing ==
Visitor track listing
No.	Title	Writer(s)	Producer(s)	Length
1.	"This Is My House"	Sienna Spiro; Omer Fedi; Nikki Giovanni; Arif Mardin; Jakob Rabitsch; Mary Weitz	Fedi; Leon Michels; Yakob	3:21
2.	"We're Not in Love"	Spiro; Fedi; Rabitsch; Weitz	Fedi; Yakob	2:59
3.	"Great Expectation"	Spiro; Fedi; Michael Pollack	Fedi	2:52
4.	"Die on This Hill"	Spiro; Fedi; Pollack	Fedi; Pollack; Blake Slatkin	3:37
5.	"He's Not My Baby, I'm His"	Spiro; Emile Haynie; Lucy Healey	Fedi; Haynie	2:40
6.	"Pure"	Spiro; Fedi	Fedi; Slatkin	3:39
7.	"The Visitor"	Spiro; Fedi; Pollack	Spiro; Fedi; Pollack	3:48
8.	"Time, You & Me"	Spiro; Fedi; Haynie; Healey	Fedi	3:30
9.	"You Stole the Show"	Spiro; Rabitsch; Weitz	Yakob; Eddie Lopes	3:27
10.	"Mono No Aware"	Spiro; Fedi	Fedi	3:13
Total length:				33:17

Japanese CD edition bonus track
No.	Title	Length
11.	"Mono No Aware" (instrumental)

Amazon Music physical edition bonus tracks
No.	Title	Length
11.	"Die on This Hill" (Amazon Music Presents)
12.	"You Stole the Show" (Amazon Music Presents)

Digital deluxe edition bonus tracks
No.	Title	Writer(s)	Producer(s)	Length
11.	"Maybe"	Spiro; Sol Was; Max Wolfgang	Was; Wolfgang	3:54
12.	"Material Lover"	Spiro; Fedi; Pollack	Fedi	2:58
13.	"Autumn Leaves"	Joseph Kosma; Johnny Mercer; Jacques Prévert	Eddie Benjamin; Carter Lang	2:47
14.	"You Stole the Show" (revisited)	Spiro; Rabitsch; Weitz	Yakob; Lopes	3:28
15.	"Die on This Hill" (unplugged)	Spiro; Fedi; Pollack	Fedi	3:35
Total length:				50:01

== Personnel ==
Credits are adapted from Tidal.

=== Musicians ===
- Sienna Spiro – vocals
- Dylan Day – guitar (tracks 1–3, 5–8, 10, 12, 14)
- Lemar Carter – drums (1–3, 5–8, 10, 12)
- Benny Bock – keyboards (1–3, 5, 6, 8, 10, 12)
- Julien Knowles – trumpet (1, 3, 12)
- Cameron Stone – cello (1, 5–8, 10)
- Hillary Smith – cello (1, 5–8, 10)
- Vanessa Freebairn-Smith – cello (1, 5–8, 10)
- Wynton Grant – violin (1, 5–8, 10)
- Yasmeen Al-Mazeedi – violin (1, 5–8, 10)
- Andrew Duckles – viola (1, 5–8, 10)
- Aiko Ritcher – violin (1, 5–8, 10)
- Luanne Homzy – violin (1, 5–8, 10)
- Max Karmazyn – violin (1, 5–8, 10)
- Mizuki Takagi – violin (1, 5–8, 10)
- Mike Valerio – upright bass (1, 5–8, 10)
- Thomas Harte – upright bass (1, 5–8, 10)
- Judy Kang – cello (1, 5, 6, 8, 10)
- Alma Fernandez – viola (1, 5, 6, 8, 10)
- Rita Andrade – viola (1, 5, 6, 8, 10)
- Zach Dellinger – viola (1, 5, 6, 8, 10)
- Bem Jacobson – violin (1, 5, 6, 8, 10)
- Charlie Bisharat – violin (1, 5, 6, 8, 10)
- Stephanie Matthews – violin (1, 5, 6, 8, 10)
- Tamara Hatwan – violin (1, 5, 6, 8, 10)
- Daniel Rotem – saxophone (1, 5, 12)
- Ido Meshulam – trombone (1, 5, 12)
- Larry Gold – string arrangement (1), strings (14)
- Leon Michels – flute, guitar (1)
- Marco Benevento – piano (1)
- Omer Fedi – bass (2–7, 12), keyboards (3, 4, 6), guitar (4, 7, 10, 12), acoustic guitar (6), electric guitar (6)
- Yakob – piano (2); organ, piano, programming, strings, synthesizer, synthesizer effects (9)
- Joe Spiro – background vocals (3)
- Andrew Synowiec – guitar (3, 5, 8), electric guitar (6)
- Michael Pollack – piano (4, 7), keyboards (4)
- Rob Moose – viola, violin (4)
- Lucy Healey – background vocals (5, 8)
- Paul Cornish – piano (5, 8)
- Raymond Mason – horn arrangement, trombone (5)
- Jake Botts – saxophone (5)
- John Michael Bradford – trumpet (5)
- Charlie Tyler – cello (7)
- Sam Allen – orchestra (7)
- Peter Rotter – string arrangement (7)
- Alyssa Park – violin (7)
- Michelle Shin – violin (7)
- Paul Cartwright – violin (7)
- Teresa Stanislav – violin (7)
- George Doering – guitar (8)
- Eddie Lopes – piano (9, 14), bass (9)
- Carlitos del Puerto – upright bass (10)
- Max Wolfgang – piano (11)
- Anna Phoebe – violin (11)

=== Technical ===
- Omer Fedi – engineering (1–8, 10, 12, 15)
- Yakob – engineering (1, 2, 9, 14), vocal editing (9)
- Leon Michels – engineering (1)
- Marco Benevento – engineering (1)
- Dan Ewins – engineering (9, 14)
- Plamen Vasilev – engineering (11)
- Michael Harris – string engineering (1–3, 5, 7, 8, 10, 12, 14, 15)
- Rob Moose – string engineering (4)
- Alisse Laymac – engineering assistance (6)
- Nicole Schmidt – engineering assistance (6)
- Tom Elmhirst – mixing (1–8, 10, 12–15)
- Joe Visciano – mixing (9)
- Darren Heelis – mixing (11)
- Nathan Dantzler – mastering (1–10, 12–15)
- Andy Baldwin – mastering (11)

== Charts ==
Chart performance for Visitor
Chart (2026)	Peak position
Australian Albums (ARIA)	3
Austrian Albums (Ö3 Austria)	9
Belgian Albums (Ultratop Flanders)	2
Belgian Albums (Ultratop Wallonia)	4
Canadian Albums (Billboard)	16
Danish Albums (Hitlisten)	4
Dutch Albums (Album Top 100)	1
French Albums (SNEP)	18
German Albums (Offizielle Top 100)	7
German Pop Albums (Offizielle Top 100)	3
Irish Albums (Official Charts)	6
Italian Albums (FIMI)	44
Japanese Top Albums Sales (Billboard Japan)	98
Lithuanian Albums (AGATA)	90
New Zealand Albums (RMNZ)	3
Norwegian Albums (IFPI Norge)	1
Polish Albums (ZPAV)	46
Portuguese Albums (AFP)	6
Scottish Albums (Official Charts)	2
Swedish Albums (Sverigetopplistan)	3
Swiss Albums (Schweizer Hitparade)	6
UK Albums (Official Charts)	2
US Billboard 200	9

== Certifications ==
Certifications for Visitor
Region	Certification	Certified units/sales
Belgium (BRMA)	Gold	10,000^{‡}
Denmark (IFPI Danmark)	Gold	10,000^{‡}
New Zealand (RMNZ)	Gold	7,500^{‡}
Sweden (GLF)	Gold	15,000^{‡}
United Kingdom (BPI)	Gold	100,000^{‡}
^{‡} Sales+streaming figures based on certification alone.
