= The Marías =

American indie pop band

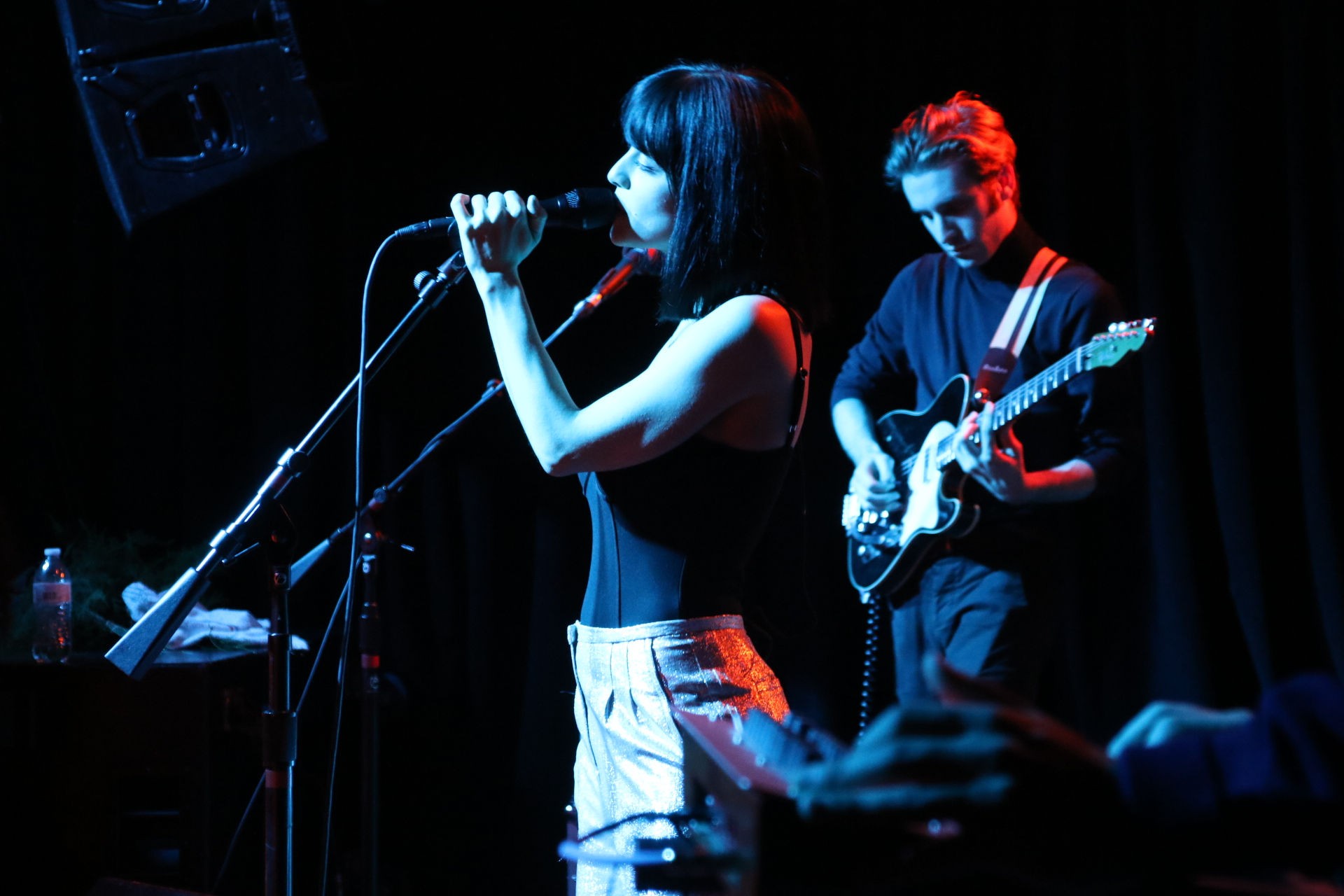
- The Marías in 2019

Background information
- Origin: Los Angeles, California, US
- Genres: Alternative pop; indie pop
- Years active: 2016–present
- Label: Atlantic
- Members: María Zardoya; Josh Conway; Jesse Perlman; Edward James
- Past members: Carter Lee
- Website: themarias.us

The Marías is an American alternative pop band from Los Angeles. They are known for performing songs in both English and Spanish in addition to infusing their music with elements including jazz percussion, guitar riffs, and horn solos. Their core lineup consists of lead vocalist María Zardoya, drummer/producer Josh Conway, guitarist Jesse Perlman, and keyboardist Edward James.

The band has released two EPs and two studio albums, including Submarine (2024). They received their first solo Grammy nomination for Best New Artist for the 68th Annual Grammy Awards in 2026.

== History ==
The band is named after its lead singer María Zardoya, who was born in Puerto Rico and grew up in Snellville, Georgia in the Atlanta metropolitan area. She and her then partner Josh Conway, the drummer/producer, met at a show at the Kibitz Room, a bar and music venue inside Canter's Deli in Los Angeles. She was performing on the bill and he was managing the sound, something he had never done before. They began writing almost immediately after meeting, and then began dating. Soon they recruited close friends to join as band members: Edward James on keyboards, and guitarist Jesse Perlman.

They were offered an opportunity to create songs for television, which helped them understand the visual and sonic feel they wanted. When the plans did not materialize, they made an EP, entitled Superclean Vol. I. from the recordings. Vol. I was released in 2017 and its counterpart Vol. II came out in 2018.

In 2018, they collaborated with Triathlon on the song "Drip", released as a single. In 2020–2021, the Marías signed to Atlantic Records. In September 2021, their single "Hush" topped the Billboard Adult Alternative Airplay chart, becoming their first chart-topping single. In 2022, the band went on tour in promotion of Cinema and opened for Halsey on her Love and Power Tour.

In 2022, they collaborated with Bad Bunny on the song "Otro Atardecer" from his album Un Verano Sin Ti. In 2023, they collaborated with Cuco on the song "Si Me Voy", which was released as a single, and also with Tainy and Young Miko on the song "Mañana" from Tainy's album Data.

Later in 2023, they collaborated with Eyedress on the songs "Separate Ways" and "A Room Up in the Sky". In February 2024, the Marías released a trailer for their second album Submarine. In March 2024, they released their first single from the album called "Run Your Mouth", as well as announcing that Submarine would release on May 31, 2024. In April 2024, they released the second single from Submarine, "Lejos de Ti" and later unveiling their tracklist for Submarine. On May 3, 2024, they released two singles simultaneously: "No One Noticed" and "If Only". On April 4, 2025, they released the non-album single "Back to Me" and its B-side track "Nobody New".

The song "No One Noticed" from the album Submarine was a viral hit on social media, reaching number 22 on the Billboard Hot 100.

Zardoya also performed with Bad Bunny at several stadium concerts in front of up to 80,000 people. Her solo project Not for Radio, with the EP Melt, was reviewed by magazines such as Interview Magazine and HERO in October 2025. Zardoya described her style as "gothic fairy".

At the 68th Annual Grammy Awards, they received their first Grammy nomination for Best New Artist.

== Influences ==
Zardoya said that her influences include Selena, Norah Jones, Sade, Nina Simone, Billie Holiday, Carla Morrison, Julieta Venegas, Erykah Badu, and filmmaker Pedro Almodóvar. Conway is influenced by Tame Impala, Radiohead, D'Angelo, and the Strokes.

Zardoya said that although Conway was not familiar with the Latin American market, the band was nevertheless open to experimenting with new styles eventually leading to releasing several Spanish-language tracks on their albums.

== Band members ==
=== Current members ===
- María Zardoya – lead vocals, guitars
- Josh Conway – drums, percussion, keyboards, synthesizers, bass, production
- Jesse Perlman – guitars
- Edward James – keyboards, synthesizers

=== Former members ===
- Carter Lee – bass

== Discography ==
=== Studio albums ===
List of albums, with selected details and peak chart positions
Title	Album details	Peak chart positions										Certifications
Title	Album details	US	US Rock	AUS	CAN	FRA	HUN	LTU	SCO	SPA Vinyl	UK Sales	Certifications
Cinema	Released: June 25, 2021; Label: Atlantic, Nice Life; Formats: CD, LP, cassette, digital download, streaming	176	35	—	—	—	—	—	—	—	—	
Submarine	Released: May 31, 2024; Label: Atlantic, Nice Life; Formats: CD, LP, cassette, digital download, streaming	17	5	73	83	188	12	44	20	57	20	RIAA: Platinum; MC: Gold
"—" denotes a recording that did not chart or was not released in that territory.

=== Extended plays ===
List of EPs with selected details
Title	EP details
Superclean Vol. I	Released: November 3, 2017; Label: Superclean; Formats: LP, digital download, streaming
Superclean Vol. II	Released: September 28, 2018; Label: Superclean; Formats: LP, digital download, streaming

=== Singles ===
==== As lead artist ====
List of singles, with selected chart positions and certifications, showing year released and album name
Title	Year	Peak chart positions										Certifications	Album
Title	Year	US	US Rock	AUS	CAN	IRE	LTU	NZ	SGP	UK	WW	Certifications	Album
"I Don't Know You"	2017	—	—	—	—	—	—	—	—	—	—		Superclean Vol. I
"Cariño"	2018	—	—	—	—	—	—	—	—	—	—		Superclean Vol. II
"Drip" (featuring Triathalon)	2018	—	—	—	—	—	—	—	—	—	—		Non-album singles
"...baby one more time"	2019	—	—	—	—	—	—	—	—	—	—		Non-album singles
"Out for the Night" (live)	2019	—	—	—	—	—	—	—	—	—	—		Non-album singles
"Hold It Together" / "Jupiter"	2020	—	—	—	—	—	—	—	—	—	—		Non-album singles
"Care for You" / "Bop It Up!"	2020	—	—	—	—	—	—	—	—	—	—		Non-album singles
"We're the Lucky Ones"	2020	—	—	—	—	—	—	—	—	—	—		Non-album singles
"Hush"	2021	—	37	—	—	—	—	—	—	—	—	RIAA: Gold	Cinema
"Un Millón"	2021	—	—	—	—	—	—	—	—	—	—	RIAA: Platinum (Latin)	Cinema
"Little by Little"	2021	—	—	—	—	—	—	—	—	—	—		Cinema
"In or In-Between" (remix) (with Claud featuring Jesse)	2021	—	—	—	—	—	—	—	—	—	—		Non-album single
"Run Your Mouth"	2024	—	49	—	—	—	—	—	—	—	—		Submarine
"Lejos de Ti"	2024	—	44	—	—	—	—	—	—	—	—	RIAA: Gold (Latin)	Submarine
"No One Noticed" / "If Only"	2024	22	4	54	53	63	44	27	15	50	27	RIAA: 6× Platinum; ARIA: Platinum; BPI: Platinum; MC: 2× Platinum; RMNZ: 2× Platinum	Submarine
"No One Noticed" / "If Only"	2024	—	—	—	—	—	—	—	—	—	—		Submarine
"Back to Me"	2025	86	13	—	—	—	—	— (Note: "Back to Me" did not enter the NZ Top 40 Singles Chart, but peaked at number 10 on the NZ Hot Singles Chart.)	—	—	—		Non-album single
"Ojos Tristes" (with Selena Gomez and Benny Blanco)	2025	56	—	—	83	—	—	— (Note: "Ojos Tristes" did not enter the NZ Top 40 Singles Chart, but peaked at number 12 on the NZ Hot Singles Chart.)	—	—	51		I Said I Love You First
"—" denotes a recording that did not chart or was not released in that territory.

==== As featured artist ====
List of singles as featured artist, with selected chart positions, showing year released and album name
Title	Year	Peak chart positions								Album
Title	Year	US	US AAA	US Rock	CAN	JPN Over.	NZ Hot	UK	UK Indie	Album
"Si Me Voy" (Cuco featuring the Marías)	2023	—	—	—	—	—	—	—	—	Non-album singles
"Separate Ways" (Eyedress featuring the Marías)	2023	—	—	—	—	—	—	—	—	Non-album singles
"A Room Up in the Sky" (Eyedress featuring the Marías)	2023	—	—	—	—	—	—	—	—	Non-album singles
"All I Did Was Dream of You" (Beabadoobee featuring the Marías)	2026	84	9	16	79	19	3	60	17	Non-album singles
"—" denotes a recording that did not chart or was not released in that territory.

==== Promotional singles ====
List of songs, with selected chart positions, showing year released and album name
Title	Year	Peak chart positions			Album
Title	Year	US Bub	US Rock	NZ Hot	Album
"Exit Music for a Film"	2020	—	—	—	Non-album single
"Nobody New"	2025	18	18	25	"Back to Me" single
"—" denotes a recording that did not chart or was not released in that territory.

=== Other charted and certified songs ===
List of songs, with selected chart positions and certifications, showing year released and album name
Title	Year	Peak chart positions										Certifications	Album
Title	Year	US	US Rock	BOL	CAN	COL	ECU	MEX	PER	SPA	WW	Certifications	Album
"Heavy"	2021	—	—	—	—	—	—	—	—	—	—	RIAA: Platinum; ARIA: Platinum; RMNZ: Gold	Cinema
"Otro Atardecer" (with Bad Bunny)	2022	49	—	20	—	21	19	17	21	24	28	PROMUSICAE: Platinum	Un Verano Sin Ti
"Sienna"	2024	74	8	—	78	—	—	—	—	—	163	ARIA: Gold; BPI: Silver; MC: Gold; RMNZ: Gold	Submarine
"—" denotes a recording that did not chart or was not released in that territory.

=== Guest appearances ===
List of non-single guest appearances, with other performing artists
Title	Year	Other artist(s)	Album
"Otro Atardecer"	2022	Bad Bunny	Un Verano Sin Ti
"Mañana"	2023	Tainy, Young Miko	Data
"Ojos Tristes"	2025	Selena Gomez, Benny Blanco	I Said I Love You First
"Memoria De Paz"	2026	Benny Blanco	Hermoso

=== Remixes ===
Title	Year	Artist	Album
"Kyoto" (The Marías remix)	2021	Phoebe Bridgers	Non-album single

== Awards and nominations ==
Award	Year	Nominee / Work	Category	Result	Ref.
American Music Awards	2025	Submarine	Favorite Rock Album	Nominated	
American Music Awards	2026	The Marías	Best Rock/Alternative Artist	Nominated	
Billboard Latin Music Awards	2025	The Marías	Hot Latin Songs Artist of the Year – Duo or Group	Nominated	
Billboard Latin Music Awards	2025	"Ojos Tristes"	Latin Pop Song of the Year	Nominated	
Grammy Awards	2022	Cinema (Note: The award is presented to the audio engineer(s) (and, since 2012, also to the mastering engineer[s]) on the winning work, not to the artist or performer, except if the artist is also a credited engineer.)	Best Engineered Album, Non-Classical	Nominated	
Grammy Awards	2023	Un Verano Sin Ti (as songwriter and featured artist)	Album of the Year	Nominated	
Grammy Awards	2026	The Marías	Best New Artist	Nominated	
Latin Grammy Awards	2022	Un Verano Sin Ti (as songwriter and featured artist)	Album of the Year	Nominated	
MTV Video Music Awards	2025	The Marías	Best New Artist	Nominated	
MTV Video Music Awards	2025	The Marías	Best Group	Nominated	
MTV Video Music Awards	2025	"Back to Me"	Best Alternative Video	Nominated	
Premios Juventud	2025	"Ojos Tristes"	Colaboración OMG	Won	
Premio Lo Nuestro	2025	"Lejos de Tí"	Best Pop Latin Fusion Song	Nominated	
