= The Visitor (song) =

2026 single by Sienna Spiro

Single by Sienna Spiro

from the album Visitor
- Released: 13 March 2026
- Studio: Valentine Recording Studios
- Genre: Pop; soul
- Length: 3:48
- Label: Capitol
- Songwriters: Sienna Spiro; Omer Fedi; Michael Pollack
- Producers: Spiro; Fedi; Pollack

Sienna Spiro singles chronology
"Die on This Hill" (2025)	"The Visitor" (2026)	"Material Lover" (2026)

Music video
- "The Visitor" on YouTube

"The Visitor" is a single by British singer Sienna Spiro, released on 13 March 2026 as the third single from her debut album of the same name. She wrote and produced the song with Omer Fedi and Michael Pollack.

== Background ==
According to Sienna Spiro, the song's title was derived from an art exhibition called The Visitor, which a friend mentioned about two years prior to the song's release. Two months later, at Smalls Jazz Club, she was introduced to a piece of music that was described as being about the temporary nature of life, which further inspired the song. Spiro stated that she has always felt like a "visitor" in her life, fearing that her relationships, friendships, jobs and other experiences would be impermanent. She wrote the song in nine attempts, eventually completing it with Omer Fedi and Michael Pollack at Valentine Recording Studios in Los Angeles.

== Composition ==
The song is a piano ballad. It also features string accompaniment by Larry Gold, opening with an arrangement of deep string instruments. Lyrically, Spiro focuses on the transient nature of a romantic relationship.

== Critical reception ==
Nmesoma Okechukwu of Euphoria Magazine gave a positive review, writing "It's interesting how much of her words cut deep". Alana of The Honey Pop described the song as particularly sad and emotionally powerful compared to Spiro's other songs, noting her significant vocal growth since her album Sink Now, Swim Later. She additionally remarked, "Although Sienna might not be belting on this new record, she's still showcasing her talent in an impressive way that continues to set the bar very high amongst her peers."

== Charts ==
Chart performance for "The Visitor"
Chart (2026)	Peak position
Australia (ARIA)	41
Canada (Canadian Hot 100)	46
Ireland (IRMA)	14
Japan Hot 100 (Billboard)	96
Netherlands (Dutch Top 40)	39
Netherlands (Single Top 100)	45
New Zealand (Recorded Music NZ)	30
Norway (VG-lista)	15
Portugal (AFP)	182
South Africa Streaming (TOSAC)	47
Sweden (Sverigetopplistan)	17
Switzerland (Schweizer Hitparade)	86
UK Singles (Official Charts)	11
US Billboard Hot 100	43

== Certifications ==
Certifications for "The Visitor"
Region	Certification	Certified units/sales
New Zealand (RMNZ)	Gold	15,000^{‡}
United Kingdom (BPI)	Silver	200,000^{‡}
^{‡} Sales+streaming figures based on certification alone.
