= Maybe (Sienna Spiro song) =

2024 single by Sienna Spiro

Single by Sienna Spiro

from the EP Sink Now, Swim Later
- Released: 2 August 2024
- Length: 3:55
- Label: Self-released
- Songwriters: Sienna Spiro; Sal Was; Max Wolfgang
- Producers: Sal Was; Max Wolfgang

Sienna Spiro singles chronology
"Need Me" (2024)	"Maybe" (2024)	"Taxi Driver" (2024)

"Maybe" is a single by British singer Sienna Spiro, released on 2 August 2024 as the second single from her debut EP, Sink Now, Swim Later. The song is also included on the digital deluxe edition of her debut album, Visitor (2026). It became her first to enter the UK Singles Chart, and later peaked at number 45 in November 2025.

Spiro said the "song about realising your worth and finally seeing who somebody truly is after being in the dark for so long".

== Track listings ==
Digital download and streaming

1. "Maybe" – 3:55

Digital download and 7" vinyl

1. "Maybe" (live from the Mews) – 3:59
2. "Maybe" – 3:55

== Charts ==
Weekly chart performance for "Maybe"
Chart (2024–2026)	Peak position
Ireland (IRMA)	65
Netherlands (Single Tip)	14
UK Singles (Official Charts)	45

== Certifications ==
Certifications for "Maybe"
Region	Certification	Certified units/sales
Canada (Music Canada)	Gold	40,000^{‡}
Denmark (IFPI Danmark)	Gold	45,000^{‡}
Netherlands (NVPI)	Gold	46,500^{‡}
New Zealand (RMNZ)	Gold	15,000^{‡}
United Kingdom (BPI)	Platinum	600,000^{‡}
Streaming
Sweden (GLF)	Gold	6,000,000^{†}
^{‡} Sales+streaming figures based on certification alone.^{†} Streaming-only figures based on certification alone.
