= Rizal Shrine =

Rizal Shrine may refer to:

- Rizal Shrine (Calamba) — Laguna, Philippines
- Rizal Shrine (Intramuros) — Manila, Philippines
- Rizal Shrine (Dapitan) — Zamboanga del Norte, Philippines
