= You Stole the Show =

2025 single by Sienna Spiro

Single by Sienna Spiro

from the album Visitor
- Released: 25 July 2025
- Length: 3:27
- Label: Capitol
- Songwriters: Sienna Spiro; Jakob Rabitsch; Mary Weitz
- Producers: Eddie Lopes; Yakob

Sienna Spiro singles chronology
"Dream Police" (2025)	"You Stole the Show" (2025)	"Die on This Hill" (2025)

"You Stole the Show" is a single by British singer Sienna Spiro, released on 25 July 2025 as the lead single from her debut album, Visitor (2026). The song peaked at number 26 on the UK Singles Chart.

Spiro said the song "explores the idea of performance – not just as an artist, but also as a person and the various ways we 'perform' in our own lives".

== Charts ==
Weekly chart performance for "You Stole the Show"
Chart (2025–2026)	Peak position
Australia (ARIA)	93
Canada (Canadian Hot 100)	78
Global 200 (Billboard)	165
Ireland (IRMA)	25
Lithuania Airplay (TopHit)	72
Norway (VG-lista)	32
Sweden (Sverigetopplistan)	98
UK Singles (Official Charts)	26
US Billboard Hot 100	55

== Certifications ==
Certifications for "You Stole the Show"
Region	Certification	Certified units/sales
Belgium (BRMA)	Gold	20,000^{‡}
New Zealand (RMNZ)	Gold	15,000^{‡}
United Kingdom (BPI)	Gold	400,000^{‡}
United States (RIAA)	Gold	500,000^{‡}
^{‡} Sales+streaming figures based on certification alone.
