= Material Lover =

2026 single by Sienna Spiro

Single by Sienna Spiro

from the album The Devil Wears Prada 2
- Released: 22 May 2026
- Length: 2:58
- Label: Interscope
- Songwriters: Sienna Spiro; Omer Fedi; Michael Pollack
- Producer: Omer Fedi

Sienna Spiro singles chronology
"The Visitor" (2026)	"Material Lover" (2026)	"Great Expectation" (2026)

Music video
- "Material Lover" on YouTube

"Material Lover" is a song by British singer Sienna Spiro from the soundtrack to the 2026 film The Devil Wears Prada 2. The song is also included on the digital deluxe edition of her debut album, Visitor (2026). It was sent to Italian radio on 22 May 2026 as the album's second single. Spiro wrote the song with Omer Fedi and Michael Pollack.

== Background ==
When Spiro watched an early cut of The Devil Wears Prada 2 after being approached about its soundtrack, she initially felt that her typically melancholy musical style did not align with the film's bubbly tone. Inspired by the film's themes, Spiro wrote "Material Lover", a song reflecting on the decline of physical media and tangible objects in the digital age, which also resonated with her preference for creating music with live instruments rather than computers or artificial intelligence.

== Critical reception ==
Jillian Giandurco of Nylon described the song as "an addictively jazzy, feel-good ode to tangible connection (and, sure, the power of a little retail therapy)".

== Music video ==
The music video, co-directed by Spiro and Ivy Tellin, was filmed at Electric Lady Studios in New York City.

== Charts ==
=== Weekly charts ===
Weekly chart performance
Chart (2026)	Peak position
Australia (ARIA)	41
Belgium (Ultratop 50 Flanders)	11
Belgium (Ultratop 50 Wallonia)	10
Denmark Airplay (Tracklisten)	6
Estonia Airplay (TopHit)	40
Ireland (IRMA)	23
Italy Airplay (EarOne)	17
Japan Hot Overseas (Billboard Japan)	17
Latvia Airplay (LaIPA)	15
Lithuania Airplay (TopHit)	135
Malta Airplay (Radiomonitor)	13
Netherlands (Dutch Top 40)	19
Netherlands (Single Top 100)	49
New Zealand (Recorded Music NZ)	18
New Zealand Airplay (RCS)	6
Poland Airplay (OLiS)	22
Romania Airplay (TopHit)	174
San Marino Airplay (SMRTV Top 50)	36
South Africa Airplay (TOSAC)	7
Sweden Heatseeker (Sverigetopplistan)	8
UK Singles (Official Charts)	13
UK Hip Hop/R&B (Official Charts)	1
US Bubbling Under Hot 100 (Billboard)	2

=== Monthly charts ===
Monthly chart performance
Chart (2026)	Peak position
Estonia Airplay (TopHit)	58

== Certifications ==
Certifications for "Material Lover"
Region	Certification	Certified units/sales
Australia (ARIA)	Gold	35,000^{‡}
New Zealand (RMNZ)	Gold	15,000^{‡}
United Kingdom (BPI)	Gold	400,000^{‡}
^{‡} Sales+streaming figures based on certification alone.
