= No One Noticed =

2024 single by the Marías

- Extended versions cover

Single by the Marías

from the album Submarine
- Released: May 3, 2024
- Genre: Alternative pop
- Length: 3:56
- Label: Atlantic; Nice Life
- Songwriters: María Zardoya; Josh Conway; Gianluca Buccellati
- Producers: Conway; Buccellati

The Marías singles chronology
"Lejos de Ti" (2024)	"No One Noticed" / "If Only" (2024)	"Back to Me" (2025)

Visualizer
- "No One Noticed" on YouTube

"No One Noticed" is a song by American indie pop band the Marías from their second studio album, Submarine (2024). It was released on May 3, 2024, as the album's third single alongside the song "If Only".

== Composition ==
"No One Noticed" has been described as a "dissociated yacht pop" song. It depicts the mental discomfort and worries from being in a relationship with a distant partner. María Zardoya pleads her lover to stay while attempting to give reasons for a deep connection despite the remote nature of the romance. Echoing background vocals that describe her thoughts are layered throughout the song.

== Release and promotion ==
In the months following its release, the song slowly achieved popularity through the video-sharing platform TikTok, where it has been soundtracked in videos about sadness. Singer Billie Eilish posted herself singing along to the song in an Instagram story on July 17, 2024, which has helped the song gain wider recognition.

== Critical reception ==
Shaad D'Souza of Paper stated the song "goes down so easy you might not notice it's kind of devastating." Chris DeVille of Stereogum wrote "The floaty slow dance 'No One Noticed' is practically a symphony of vibes, but it hits so much harder with Zardoya ushering us into her headspace with an opening line like 'Maybe I lost my mind/ No one noticed' and then complicating her perspective with bars like 'No one tried to read my eyes/ No one but you/ Wish it weren't true.'"

== Charts ==
=== Weekly charts ===
Weekly chart performance for "No One Noticed"
Chart (2024–2025)	Peak position
Australia (ARIA)	54
Canada Hot 100 (Billboard)	53
CIS Airplay (TopHit)	72
Global 200 (Billboard)	27
Greece International (IFPI)	78
Ireland (IRMA)	63
Israel International Airplay (Media Forest)	16
Lithuania (AGATA)	44
Malaysia (Billboard)	19
Malaysia International (RIM)	12
Netherlands (Single Tip)	7
New Zealand (Recorded Music NZ)	27
Philippines (Philippines Hot 100)	84
Portugal (AFP)	178
Singapore (RIAS)	15
Sweden Heatseeker (Sverigetopplistan)	16
Switzerland (Schweizer Hitparade)	74
UK Singles (Official Charts)	50
US Billboard Hot 100	22
US Adult Pop Airplay (Billboard)	34
US Hot Rock & Alternative Songs (Billboard)	4
US Pop Airplay (Billboard)	22

=== Year-end charts ===
2024 year-end chart performance for "No One Noticed"
Chart (2024)	Position
US Hot Rock & Alternative Songs (Billboard)	74

2025 year-end chart performance for "No One Noticed"
Chart (2025)	Position
Australia (ARIA)	61
Global 200 (Billboard)	36
New Zealand (Recorded Music NZ)	34
US Billboard Hot 100	32
US Hot Rock & Alternative Songs (Billboard)	6

== Certifications ==
Certifications for "No One Noticed"
Region	Certification	Certified units/sales
Australia (ARIA)	Platinum	70,000^{‡}
Canada (Music Canada)	2× Platinum	160,000^{‡}
France (SNEP)	Platinum	200,000^{‡}
New Zealand (RMNZ)	2× Platinum	60,000^{‡}
Poland (ZPAV)	Gold	62,500^{‡}
Portugal (AFP)	Gold	12,000^{‡}
Spain (Promusicae)	Gold	50,000^{‡}
United Kingdom (BPI)	Platinum	600,000^{‡}
United States (RIAA)	6× Platinum	6,000,000^{‡}
Streaming
Greece (IFPI Greece)	Gold	1,000,000^{†}
^{‡} Sales+streaming figures based on certification alone.^{†} Streaming-only figures based on certification alone.
