= Submarine (The Marías album) =

- Original and physical cover

Studio album by the Marías
- Released: May 31, 2024
- Genres: Alternative pop; dream pop; indie pop; synth-pop
- Length: 45:13
- Languages: English; Spanish
- Labels: Atlantic; Nice Life
- Producers: Gianluca Buccellati; Josh Conway

The Marías chronology
Cinema (2021)	Submarine (2024)

Alternative cover
- New cover used for digital and streaming editions

Singles from Submarine
- 1. "Run Your Mouth" Released: March 7, 2024; 2. "Lejos De Ti" Released: April 5, 2024; 3. "If Only" / "No One Noticed" Released: May 3, 2024

A couple of the songs on the album started like "Paranoia" where we were all just together in the room and the energy of all of us being together just creates a song. And then you know, the other songs were pretty much the same process. With the EPs and Cinema it would be Josh and I in the studio sometimes starting with a chord progression, sometimes starting with the lyric or concept and hoping for the best.

— Vocalist María Zardoya on recording Submarine

Submarine is the second studio album by American alternative pop band the Marías, released on May 31, 2024. The album received positive reviews from critics. The album marked their first studio release since Cinema, released in 2021.

== Background and release ==
After finishing their Cinema tour promoting their previous album, María Zardoya and Josh Conway ended their relationship and the band took a six-month hiatus in which they spent four months apart before the first sessions which would later become Submarine. The band members collectively went to therapy and used the emotional process of the breakup to inform their music. The film Three Colours: Blue inspired many elements of the album, including the "very intentional" colour palette shift from red to blue.

In the lead up to Submarine, four singles were released. "Run Your Mouth" was released on March 7, 2024 alongside a music video. The song was written shortly after their breakup in which María felt "conflict avoidant" at the time, and the song had also previously been performed on tour since 2022. "Lejos De Ti" was released alongside another video on April 5, 2024, which was shot at Lake Tahoe. The final two singles, "If Only" and "No One Noticed", were released on May 3, 2024 simultaneously. On May 28, 2024, over 100 record stores across the United States held public listening parties for Submarine, where exclusive merch was sold and the Marías' new album was played. The album was released on May 31, 2024.

== Reception ==
Writing for the Associated Press, Elise Ryan praised the "genre-bending experimentation that characterized" the band's previous work made up of "varied, lush productions" that listeners "will enjoy sinking into". Robin Murray of Clash rated this album a 7 out of 10, stating that "this is a crisp album, well curated and often surprising" that advances the band's sound, helping them to "move past the barrier of the tricky second album with no small degree of confidence". Editors at Stereogum chose this as Album of the Week, where Chris DeVille, calling it the "soundtrack of the summer" and he compared the music to Beach House and BadBadNotGood.

On June 4, Stereogum did a roundup of the best albums of the year so far and ranked Submarine at 47, with Chris DeVille stating that it "continues the Marías' mastery of their own unique combination of psych, jazz, lounge, downtempo, dream-pop, and more".

== Track listing ==
Submarine track listing
No.	Title	Writer(s)	Producer(s)	Length
1.	"Ride"	María Zardoya; Josh Conway	Conway	1:21
2.	"Hamptons"	Zardoya; Conway	Conway	3:08
3.	"Echo"	Zardoya; Conway	Conway	3:29
4.	"Run Your Mouth"	Zardoya; Conway	Conway	2:40
5.	"Real Life"	Zardoya; Conway; Edward James; Jesse Perlman	Conway	3:26
6.	"Blur"	Zardoya; Conway; Perlman; Marvin Figueroa; David Leavitt; Gabriel Steiner	Conway	3:45
7.	"Paranoia"	Zardoya; Conway; James; Perlman	Conway	3:51
8.	"Lejos de Ti"	Zardoya; Conway	Conway	2:59
9.	"Love You Anyway"	Zardoya; Conway; Perlman	Conway	3:57
10.	"Ay No Puedo"	Zardoya; Conway; Doron Zounes	Conway	3:01
11.	"No One Noticed"	Zardoya; Conway; Gianluca Buccellati	Conway; Buccellati	3:56
12.	"Vicious Sensitive Robot"	Zardoya; Conway	Conway	3:14
13.	"If Only"	Zardoya; Conway; Kathleen Brennan; Tom Waits	Conway	2:36
14.	"Sienna"	Zardoya; Conway	Conway	3:44
Total length:				45:13

== Personnel ==
The Marías

- María Zardoya – lead vocals
- Josh Conway – bass, guitar, synthesizer, production, engineering (all tracks); drums (tracks 1–12), keyboards (1–4, 7–12, 14), vocals (12), piano (13)
- Jesse Perlman – guitar (tracks 1–12, 14), keyboards (11)
- Edward James – keyboards (tracks 5, 7), synthesizer (7)

Additional

- Joe LaPorta – mastering
- Neal H Pogue – mixing
- Gianluca Buccellati – production, engineering, guitar, keyboards, synthesizer (track 11)
- Ricky Reed – co-production (track 4)
- Gabriel Steiner – co-production (track 6), additional production (5–7), trumpet (5, 6, 10); drums, keyboards (6)
- Doron Zounes – co-production, guitar, keyboards (track 10)
- Bill Malina – strings engineering, strings arrangement (track 12)
- Ro Rowan – cello (track 12)
- Marta Honer – viola (track 12)
- Jayla Tang – violin (track 12)
- Stephanie Matthews – violin (track 12)

== Charts ==
=== Weekly charts ===
Weekly chart performance for Submarine
Chart (2024–2026)	Peak position
Australian Albums (ARIA)	73
Canadian Albums (Billboard)	83
French Albums (SNEP)	176
Hungarian Physical Albums (MAHASZ)	12
Lithuanian Albums (AGATA)	44
Scottish Albums (Official Charts)	20
Spanish Vinyl Albums (PROMUSICAE)	57
UK Albums Sales (OCC)	20
US Billboard 200	17
US Top Rock & Alternative Albums (Billboard)	6

=== Year-end charts ===
Year-end chart performance for Submarine
Chart (2025)	Position
US Billboard 200	61

== Certifications ==
Certifications for Submarine
Region	Certification	Certified units/sales
Canada (Music Canada)	Gold	40,000^{‡}
United States (RIAA)	Platinum	1,000,000^{‡}
^{‡} Sales+streaming figures based on certification alone.

== See also ==
- 2024 in American music
- List of 2024 albums
