= Die on This Hill =

2025 single by Sienna Spiro

Single by Sienna Spiro

from the album Visitor
- Released: 10 October 2025
- Recorded: 2025
- Studio: Henson Recording Studios (Los Angeles)
- Genre: Pop; soul
- Length: 3:37
- Label: Capitol
- Songwriters: Sienna Spiro; Omer Fedi; Michael Pollack
- Producers: Fedi; Pollack; Blake Slatkin

Sienna Spiro singles chronology
"You Stole the Show" (2025)	"Die on This Hill" (2025)	"The Visitor" (2026)

Music video
- "Die on This Hill" on YouTube

"Die on This Hill" is a single by British singer Sienna Spiro, released on 10 October 2025 as the second single from her debut album, Visitor (2026). The song was written by Spiro, Omer Fedi and Michael Pollack, while Fedi, Pollack and Blake Slatkin handled the production.

Spiro began writing the song while learning to play "Bohemian Rhapsody" by Queen on the piano. After collaborating with Fedi and Pollack, the song developed through several revisions with Slatkin helping complete the final version. The lyrics describe a strained romantic relationship.

"Die on This Hill" received positive critical reception and commercial success, becoming Spiro's breakthrough single. The song sold over 6 million units worldwide and it peaked at number 19 on the US Billboard Hot 100 and reached the top 10 in Belgium, Indonesia, Malaysia, the Netherlands, the Philippines, and the United Kingdom. The music video for the song was released on 24 January 2026, and was directed by Cole Bennett.

== Background ==
Sienna Spiro came up with the first verse of the song while trying to learn to play "Bohemian Rhapsody" by Queen on the piano. The next day, she finished writing the song in a session with Omer Fedi and Michael Pollack. They then worked on recording the song for months; at one point, the song was even developed into a "completely different genre". Early versions of the song were written in a different key and arranged at a faster tempo with additional instrumentation, including trumpets. During the writing process, Spiro experimented with several stylistic directions, at various points describing the song as sounding similar to works by Lauryn Hill, Silk Sonic, and Teddy Pendergrass. It was eventually completed with the help of Blake Slatkin.

Spiro stated that the song has been a "constant theme" throughout her life, adding "I didn't write it about one specific story, more rather about a lifetime of stubbornness and showing up for people that never did for me". She has also said that the title's phrase reminds her of herself, with respect to her loyalty. She also described the track as reflecting feelings of frustration during the recording process, which she said influenced her vocal performance.

== Composition ==
The song is built around piano lines, performed by Pollack, and features a string arrangement from Rob Moose. Sienna Spiro described the song to be about "stubborn love", in which an individual stays in a relationship when they know they should leave.

== Critical reception ==
Colin of TuneFountain gave a positive review, writing "Her voice carries every ounce of longing and determination in the lyrics, immersing listeners in a story of attachment, denial and hope. The production is both cinematic and intimate, surrounding her vocal with space and texture that magnify its emotional weight". In regard to the theme of the song, he commented "That sense of conflict runs through every chord, balancing fragility with defiance. The result is a piece that feels raw yet refined, an anthem for anyone who has ever struggled to let go". Vincent Lane of The Garnette Report remarked "In a stunning display of her extraordinary vocal prowess, Sienna balances the song's unbridled emotion with an exquisite command of her instrument, channeling both aching desperation and fierce determination with equal intensity. As Moose's string arrangement envelops the song in a spellbinding grandeur, 'Die On This Hill' achieves a particularly powerful impact at its chorus: 'You'd take my life/Just for the thrill/I'll take tonight/And die on this hill'. The result: an epic heartbreak tale in just three and a half minutes".

== Charts ==
=== Weekly charts ===
Weekly chart performance for "Die on This Hill"
Chart (2025–2026)	Peak position
Australia (ARIA)	19
Austria (Ö3 Austria Top 40)	54
Austria Airplay (IFPI)	13
Belgium (Ultratop 50 Flanders)	2
Belgium (Ultratop 50 Wallonia)	6
Canada (Canadian Hot 100)	26
Canada CHR/Top 40 (Billboard)	23
Canada Hot AC (Billboard)	34
Central America Anglo Airplay (Monitor Latino)	10
Croatia International Airplay (Top lista)	74
Czech Republic Airplay (ČNS IFPI)	100
Denmark (Tracklisten)	25
France (SNEP)	60
Germany (GfK)	45
Germany Airplay (BVMI)	9
Global 200 (Billboard)	11
Greece International (IFPI)	54
Guatemala Anglo Airplay (Monitor Latino)	6
Iceland (Billboard)	24
Indonesia (IFPI)	7
Ireland (IRMA)	11
Israel International Airplay (Media Forest)	9
Italy Airplay (EarOne)	10
Lebanon (Lebanese Top 20)	8
Lithuania Airplay (TopHit)	16
Luxembourg (Billboard)	24
Malaysia (IFPI)	3
Malaysia International (RIM)	2
Malta Airplay (Radiomonitor)	12
Netherlands (Dutch Top 40)	5
Netherlands (Single Top 100)	11
New Zealand (Recorded Music NZ)	13
Norway (VG-lista)	17
Peru Anglo Airplay (Monitor Latino)	13
Philippines (IFPI)	4
Philippines Hot 100 (Billboard Philippines)	5
Poland Airplay (OLiS)	70
Portugal (AFP)	30
Puerto Rico Anglo Airplay (Monitor Latino)	3
Singapore (RIAS)	8
Slovenia Airplay (Radiomonitor)	19
Spain Airplay (Promusicae)	35
Sweden (Sverigetopplistan)	17
Switzerland (Schweizer Hitparade)	32
Switzerland Airplay (IFPI)	2
UK Singles (Official Charts)	9
US Billboard Hot 100	19
US Adult Contemporary (Billboard)	20
US Adult Pop Airplay (Billboard)	9
US Pop Airplay (Billboard)	9

=== Monthly charts ===
Monthly chart performance for "Die on This Hill"
Chart (2025)	Peak position
Lithuania Airplay (TopHit)	34

=== Year-end charts ===
Year-end chart performance for "Die on This Hill"
Chart (2025)	Position
Netherlands (Dutch Top 40)	81

== Certifications and sales ==
Certifications for "Die on This Hill"
Region	Certification	Certified units/sales
Australia (ARIA)	Platinum	70,000^{‡}
Belgium (BRMA)	Platinum	40,000^{‡}
Brazil (Pro-Música Brasil)	Platinum	40,000^{‡}
Denmark (IFPI Danmark)	Gold	45,000^{‡}
France (SNEP)	Gold	100,000^{‡}
Netherlands (NVPI)	Gold	46,500^{‡}
New Zealand (RMNZ)	Platinum	30,000^{‡}
Portugal (AFP)	Platinum	25,000^{‡}
United Kingdom (BPI)	Platinum	600,000^{‡}
United States (RIAA)	Platinum	1,000,000^{‡}
Streaming
Sweden (GLF)	Gold	6,000,000^{†}
Summaries
Worldwide	—	4,000,000
^{‡} Sales+streaming figures based on certification alone.^{†} Streaming-only figures based on certification alone.

== Release history ==
Release dates and formats for "Die on This Hill"
Region	Date	Format	Label(s)	Ref.
Worldwide	10 October 2025	Digital download; streaming	Capitol	
Worldwide	17 April 2026	7"	Capitol	
United States	20 January 2026	Contemporary hit radio	Capitol	
