= Peaches (Justin Bieber song) =

2021 single by Justin Bieber featuring Daniel Caesar and Giveon

Single by Justin Bieber featuring Daniel Caesar and Giveon

from the album Justice
- Released: March 19, 2021
- Genre: Pop; R&B; pop soul
- Length: 3:18
- Label: Def Jam
- Songwriters: Justin Bieber; Ashton Simmonds; Giveon Evans; Bernard Harvey; Luis Martinez, Jr.; Andrew Wotman; Louis Bell; Matthew Sean Leon; Felisha King-Harvey; Aaron Simmonds; Keavan Yazdani
- Producers: Harv; Shndo

Justin Bieber singles chronology
"Hold On" (2021)	"Peaches" (2021)	"Let It Go" (2021)

Daniel Caesar singles chronology
"Love Again" (2019)	"Peaches" (2021)	"Invincible" (2022)

Giveon singles chronology
"O Christmas Tree" (2020)	"Peaches" (2021)	"For Tonight" (2021)

Music video
- "Peaches" on YouTube

Audio sample
- file; help

"Peaches" is a song by Canadian singer Justin Bieber featuring Daniel Caesar and Giveon. It was released through Def Jam Recordings on March 19, 2021, as the fifth single from the former's sixth studio album, Justice, which was released the same day. First-time collaborators, the artists wrote the song with producers Harv and Shndo, alongside Andrew Watt, Louis Bell, Sean Leon, Harv's wife Felisha King-Harvey of Cherish, Vincent Massi, and Keavan Yazdani. There are two remixes of the song: the first contains guest appearances from American rappers and singers Ludacris, Usher, and Snoop Dogg, while the second features Nigerian musicians Alpha P, Omah Lay, and Masterkraft.

"Peaches" debuted atop the Billboard Hot 100, giving Bieber his seventh number-one hit on the chart, while it gave both Caesar and Giveon their first number-one. Elsewhere, the song topped simultaneously both the Billboard Global 200 and Global Excl. U.S., as well as charts in Australia, Canada, Denmark, Ireland, New Zealand, Norway, Portugal, Singapore and Slovakia. It also peaked within the top ten of the record charts in the United Kingdom and 20 other countries. It received four nominations at the 64th Annual Grammy Awards: Record of the Year, Song of the Year, Best R&B Performance, and Best Music Video.

== Background ==
Bieber started to write the chorus of "Peaches" while staying with Shawn Mendes and Andrew Watt at the latter's house. Watt showed Bieber around his home studio and told him to "go play the drums". After having recorded a drum beat, Bieber sat down at the piano and played some chords, which they also recorded and looped. Watt then recorded some bass and guitar and Bieber started "just talking words back and forth for fun". After the session, Bieber asked Watt to send him the demo so he could work on it some more by himself.

Bieber posted a snippet of the song of him singing the chorus while playing the piano on his Instagram account on September 7, 2020. Record producer Shndo later listened to it and decided to further produce the song. He screen-recorded the Instagram video, recorded some drums over it in the music software Ableton and decided to speed up the song. Record producer Harv then added some more instruments to the song.

Shndo and Harv presented the song to Bieber, who loved it and later re-recorded the chorus and wrote a verse before sending it back to the producers to work on it some more. On the same day, Bieber contacted Giveon, who accepted to be a part of the song. Bieber later asked Daniel Caesar to also be a part of the track.

== Composition and lyrics ==
"Peaches" is a laid-back pop, R&B, and pop soul ballad that cruises along over a mid-tempo funk groove and laced with a West Coast bounce. It has been described as "colorful", "sun-dappled" and "slinky". Musically, the song is set in the key of C major and has a tempo of 90 beats per minute. It follows a simple four-chord structure of F major–E minor–D minor–C major. Bieber's voice has "a bright, pliable timbre" applied to it in the chorus and his verse, delivering his lines with a "pop twang". Caesar croons over his verse with a "smooth" delivery, while Giveon's vocals have a "silky baritone" to them. The track opens with a muted, "battered upright" piano part that becomes the song's backbone before introducing "leisurely" licks produced by an electric guitar. Additional synth layers are present at a chorus breakdown after the third verse, consisting of a string pad, synth lead and a subtly reversed pad. The song closes out instrumentally with a synth solo.

Lyrically, "Peaches" is a love song where Bieber, Caesar, and Giveon sing about their well-established relationships. The first verse finds Bieber alluding to a long-lasting romance: "There's nothing like your touch / It's the way you lift me up / And I'll be right here with you 'til the end." Zach Seemayer‍ of Entertainment Tonight suggested that the song was written with Bieber's wife Hailey Baldwin in mind. The chorus, which is "a sweet ode to different regions" and repeated seven times, is sung in a "call-and-response" style that intercuts each artist's verse, where Bieber professes to "get[ting] his peaches in Georgia and his weed from California". He also mentions "get[ting his] light right from the source", which some critics have speculated to be a religious reference that refers to God. On Caesar's verse, Boston Globe correspondent Maura Johnston drew comparisons between it and the music of American singer-songwriter Maxwell. She wrote that the "besotted" verse "lyrically recalls the romanticism of Maxwell's most lovelorn work". Giveon brings a sense of urgency to his voice in his verse as he sings the line: "Done being distracted / The one I need is right in my arms."

== Promotion ==
To promote "Peaches", Bieber teamed up with cannabis company Palms to launch a cannabis line that is titled after the song on October 4, 2021. Bieber explained his reasoning for starting the line, telling Vogue, "Weed was something that I felt people tried to make me feel bad for enjoying." He added, "But I've now found a place in my life for weed products that have been beneficial in my human experience".

== Critical reception ==
"Peaches" received critical acclaim upon its release. Billboard critic Jason Lipshutz ranked it as the second-best song on Justice, writing that "'Peaches' flips the script with vivacious R&B energy" and "levitat[es] off the ground with Giveon and Daniel Caesar along for the top-down ride". Elamin Abdelmahmoud of BuzzFeed News considered "Peaches" to be the best song on Justice and "a career high for Bieber". Valerie Magan of Consequence of Sound deemed it the standout track on Justice and called it "a colorful, R&B-adjacent fever dream". Exclaim!'s Rosemary Akpan shared a similar sentiment, listing the song as one of Justice's standouts. Jon Caramanica wrote for The New York Times that the track "finds Bieber at his most vocally flexible" and regarded it as the most successful collaboration on Justice. Roisin O'Connor of The Independent and Mikael Wood of the Los Angeles Times referred to it as an album highlight. Sumiko Wilson of Complex Canada stated that the song "embodies the R&B sound" that Bieber "thought he was tapping into" on his previous album Changes.

Ana Clara Ribeiro from PopMatters viewed Caesar and Giveon as "strong collaborators" who "steal the spotlight" on "Peaches". Alex Zidel of HotNewHipHop felt that the track "will be a lasting success well into the summer season", writing that its chorus "will leave you humming the melody for days on end". Gabriella Ferlita of Gigwise called it "effortlessly sumptuous" and "a deliciously fictitious musical affair between the sounds of Anderson Paak and Jack Johnson". NME's Will Lavin described the song as "the ultimate pick-me-up" that "invit[es] visions of beach drives with the top down". Stereogum's Chris DeVille felt that "the song's loose, easygoing neo-soul vibe is hard to deny". Bianca Gracie of Uproxx said that the song's breeziness "compliments Bieber's sonic effortlessness", but thought it might have worked better if Caesar and Giveon were substituted for other artists who are better representations of the song's mentioned locations and flow.

== Accolades ==
Awards and nominations for "Peaches"
Year	Organization	Award	Result	Ref(s)
2021	MTV Millennial Awards	Global Hit of the Year	Nominated	
2021	MTV Video Music Awards	Best Pop	Won	
2021	MTV Video Music Awards	Best Collaboration	Nominated	
2021	MTV Video Music Awards	Best Editing	Nominated	
2021	MTV Video Music Awards	Song of Summer	Nominated	
2021	MTV Millennial Awards Brazil	Global Hit	Nominated	
2022	iHeartRadio Music Awards	Song of the Year	Nominated	
2022	iHeartRadio Music Awards	Best Collaboration	Nominated	
2022	iHeartRadio Music Awards	Best Music Video	Nominated	
2022	Grammy Awards	Record of the Year	Nominated	
2022	Grammy Awards	Song of the Year	Nominated	
2022	Grammy Awards	Best R&B Performance	Nominated	
2022	Grammy Awards	Best Music Video	Nominated	
2022	Juno Award	Single of the Year	Nominated	
2022	Billboard Music Awards	Top Collaboration	Nominated	
2022	Billboard Music Awards	Top R&B Song	Nominated	

== Commercial performance ==
In the United States, "Peaches" debuted atop the Billboard Hot 100 chart dated March 30, 2021, becoming the 50th song to debut at number one, and giving Bieber his seventh number-one single and 23rd top-ten hit. "Peaches" started with 30.6 million US streams, becoming his fifth number-one song on Streaming Songs chart, at the No. 3 on Digital Songs chart with sales of 16,000 units, and attracted 12.1 million radio airplay audience impressions. Due to the song reaching the summit, Bieber tied Canadian rapper and singer Drake as the only male artists with four number-one entrances on the chart. The song additionally became both Caesar and Giveon's first number-one single on the chart. With the song's parent album, Justice, entering the Billboard 200 at the top position in the same week, Bieber became the third artist to debut at number one on both charts simultaneously, following BTS and Taylor Swift in 2020, as well as the first male soloist to do so. "Peaches" subsequently topped the Rhythmic Airplay and Pop Airplay charts, becoming Bieber's fifth and eighth leader, respectively.

In the United Kingdom, "Peaches" debuted at number one on the Official Trending Chart dated March 23, 2021. It entered the UK Singles Chart at number three, earning Bieber the week's highest new entry. The song rose to a new peak of number two on its third week on the chart, maintaining its position for four consecutive weeks. In Ireland, "Peaches" debuted atop the Irish Singles Chart and became Bieber's seventh number one single. Bieber also claimed the Official Irish Chart Double as Justice debuted at number one on the Irish Albums Chart. In Australia, "Peaches" debuted at number two on the ARIA Singles Chart. The song peaked at number one on its third week on the chart, becoming Bieber's fourth number one single and earning him a chart double with Justice spending a second non-consecutive week atop the national albums chart. The song stayed at the top position the following week. In New Zealand, "Peaches" entered the singles chart at number one and held the position for six consecutive weeks, earning Bieber his tenth number-one single in the country.

== Live performances ==
Bieber performed a solo stripped-down version of "Peaches" at NPR's Tiny Desk Concert on March 17, 2021, two days before the song's official release. The song was performed alongside previously released singles "Holy", "Anyone", and "Hold On". On May 25, 2021, Bieber performed a medley of "Peaches" and "Hold On" on the twentieth-season finale of The Voice. Bieber performed a stripped-back rendition of "Peaches" along with "Hold On", "Love You Different", and "Somebody" during the iHeartRadio Wango Tango on June 30, 2021.

On April 3, 2022, Bieber performed a stripped back version of "Peaches" on his piano at the 64th Annual Grammy Awards, where the song was up for four nominations. He was later joined by collaborators Daniel Caesar and Giveon, as well as a full band, in the second half of the performance.

== Music video ==
The official music video for "Peaches", directed by Colin Tilley, was released alongside the song and album on March 19, 2021. Bieber teased the clip by sharing images of himself with Caesar and Giveon over social media days before its release. The video sees the three singing through various locations filled with technicolored visuals. It follows Bieber, Caesar, and Giveon driving a vintage car as they cruise down city streets illuminated by neon lights. The scene utilizes a projector and backdrop to make the stage look like a moving highway. While Bieber and Giveon sit in the car and take turns driving, Caesar appears relaxing on the hood or lying on the roof of the moving vehicle multiple times throughout the video. Bieber also dances through a hallway among large neon lettering that spells out the song's name. He wears a series of street-style outfits, including a puffer jacket, plaid shirt, baggy jeans, and knitted cap, before flaunting a peach-colored suit inside a dome structure with soft lighting and mirrors.

== Credits and personnel ==
Credits adapted from Tidal and Jaxsta.

- Justin Bieber – lead vocals, songwriting
- Daniel Caesar – featured artist, lead vocals, songwriting
- Giveon – featured artist, lead vocals, songwriting
- Harv – songwriting, production, bass, guitar, keyboards, piano
- Shndo – songwriting, production
- Aaron Simmonds – songwriting
- Andrew Watt – songwriting, vocal engineering, vocal production
- Felisha King – songwriting
- Keavan Yazdani – songwriting
- Louis Bell – songwriting
- Matthew Sean Leon – songwriting
- Colin Leonard – mastering
- Josh Gudwin – mixing, vocal engineering, vocal production
- Heidi Wang – assistant mixing
- Ryan Lytle – assistant record engineering
- Mark Parfitt - additional engineering

== Charts ==
=== Weekly charts ===
Weekly chart performance for "Peaches"
Chart (2021–2022)	Peak position
Argentina Hot 100 (Billboard)	15
Australia (ARIA)	1
Austria (Ö3 Austria Top 40)	2
Belgium (Ultratop 50 Flanders)	12
Belgium (Ultratop 50 Wallonia)	11
Bolivia (Monitor Latino)	3
Canada Hot 100 (Billboard)	1
Canada AC (Billboard)	5
Canada CHR/Top 40 (Billboard)	1
Canada Hot AC (Billboard)	1
Chile (Monitor Latino)	5
Colombia (National-Report)	10
Costa Rica (Monitor Latino)	11
Croatia (HRT)	7
Czech Republic Singles Digital (ČNS IFPI)	2
Denmark (Tracklisten)	1
Dominican Republic (Monitor Latino)	14
El Salvador (Monitor Latino)	5
Finland (Suomen virallinen lista)	5
France (SNEP)	7
Germany (GfK)	2
Global 200 (Billboard)	1
Greece (IFPI)	2
Honduras (Monitor Latino)	4
Hungary (Rádiós Top 40)	6
Hungary (Single Top 40)	4
Hungary (Stream Top 40)	4
Iceland (Tónlistinn)	3
India International Singles (IMI)	1
Ireland (IRMA)	1
Italy (FIMI)	8
Japan Hot 100 (Billboard)	70
Lebanon (OLT20)	5
Lithuania (AGATA)	2
Malaysia (RIM)	2
Mexico (Billboard Mexican Airplay)	3
Netherlands (Dutch Top 40)	2
Netherlands (Single Top 100)	1
New Zealand (Recorded Music NZ)	1
Nicaragua (Monitor Latino)	10
Norway (VG-lista)	1
Panama (Monitor Latino)	4
Paraguay (Monitor Latino)	14
Peru (UNIMPRO)	11
Poland Airplay (ZPAV)	34
Portugal (AFP)	1
Portugal Airplay (AFP)	6
Puerto Rico (Monitor Latino)	13
Romania (Airplay 100)	2
San Marino (SMRRTV Top 50)	14
Singapore (RIAS)	1
Slovakia Airplay (ČNS IFPI)	13
Slovakia Singles Digital (ČNS IFPI)	1
South Africa (RISA)	1
South Korea (Gaon)	2
Spain (Promusicae)	8
Sweden (Sverigetopplistan)	3
Switzerland (Schweizer Hitparade)	2
UK Singles (Official Charts)	2
US Billboard Hot 100	1
US Adult Contemporary (Billboard)	17
US Adult Pop Airplay (Billboard)	4
US Dance Airplay (Billboard)	10
US Hot R&B/Hip-Hop Songs (Billboard)	1
US Pop Airplay (Billboard)	1
US Rhythmic Airplay (Billboard)	1
US Rolling Stone Top 100	1
Venezuela (Record Report)	51
Vietnam (Billboard Vietnam Hot 100)	72

=== Monthly charts ===
Monthly chart performance for "Peaches"
Chart (2021)	Peak position
Brazil (Top 50 Streaming)	38
Paraguay (SGP)	38

=== Year-end charts ===
2021 year-end chart performance for "Peaches"
Chart (2021)	Position
Australia (ARIA)	14
Austria (Ö3 Austria Top 40)	31
Belgium (Ultratop Flanders)	50
Belgium (Ultratop Wallonia)	32
Brazil Streaming (Pro-Música Brasil)	104
Canada (Canadian Hot 100)	4
Croatia (HRT)	68
Denmark (Tracklisten)	7
France (SNEP)	27
Germany (Official German Charts)	37
Global 200 (Billboard)	11
Hungary (Rádiós Top 40)	65
Hungary (Single Top 40)	58
Hungary (Stream Top 40)	31
Iceland (Tónlistinn)	15
India International Singles (IMI)	8
Ireland (IRMA)	23
Italy (FIMI)	58
Mexico (AMPROFON)	6
Netherlands (Dutch Top 40)	48
Netherlands (Single Top 100)	13
New Zealand (Recorded Music NZ)	10
Norway (VG-lista)	18
Portugal (AFP)	15
South Korea (Gaon)	6
Spain (PROMUSICAE)	66
Sweden (Sverigetopplistan)	26
Switzerland (Schweizer Hitparade)	18
UK Singles (OCC)	23
US Billboard Hot 100	10
US Adult Top 40 (Billboard)	16
US Dance/Mix Show Airplay (Billboard)	37
US Hot R&B/Hip-Hop Songs (Billboard)	2
US Mainstream Top 40 (Billboard)	14
US Rhythmic (Billboard)	5

2022 year-end chart performance for "Peaches"
Chart (2022)	Position
Global 200 (Billboard)	65
Hungary (Rádiós Top 40)	39
Portugal (AFP)	131
South Korea (Circle)	129

== Certifications ==
Certifications for "Peaches"
Region	Certification	Certified units/sales
Australia (ARIA)	5× Platinum	350,000^{‡}
Austria (IFPI Austria)	Platinum	30,000^{‡}
Belgium (BRMA)	Platinum	40,000^{‡}
Brazil (Pro-Música Brasil)	3× Diamond	480,000^{‡}
Canada (Music Canada)	6× Platinum	480,000^{‡}
Denmark (IFPI Danmark)	3× Platinum	270,000^{‡}
France (SNEP)	Diamond	333,333^{‡}
Germany (BVMI)	Gold	200,000^{‡}
Italy (FIMI)	2× Platinum	140,000^{‡}
Mexico (AMPROFON)	2× Diamond	1,400,000^{‡}
New Zealand (RMNZ)	5× Platinum	150,000^{‡}
Norway (IFPI Norway)	2× Platinum	120,000^{‡}
Poland (ZPAV)	2× Platinum	100,000^{‡}
Portugal (AFP)	3× Platinum	30,000^{‡}
Spain (Promusicae)	2× Platinum	120,000^{‡}
United Kingdom (BPI)	2× Platinum	1,200,000^{‡}
United States (RIAA)	4× Platinum	4,000,000^{‡}
Streaming
Greece (IFPI Greece)	Platinum	2,000,000^{†}
Japan (RIAJ)	Gold	50,000,000^{†}
South Korea (KMCA)	Platinum	100,000,000^{†}
Sweden (GLF)	2× Platinum	16,000,000^{†}
^{‡} Sales+streaming figures based on certification alone.^{†} Streaming-only figures based on certification alone.

== Remix ==
"Peaches" (remix)

Remix by Justin Bieber featuring Ludacris, Usher, and Snoop Dogg
- Released: June 7, 2021
- Length: 3:49
- Label: Def Jam
- Songwriters: Justin Bieber; Ashton Simmonds; Giveon Evans; Andrew Watt; Louis Bell; Bernard "Harv" Harvey; Luis Martinez Jr.; Calvin Broadus; Christopher Bridges; Usher Raymond IV
- Producers: Harv; Shndo

=== Background and lyrics ===
A remix of the song, featuring American rappers Ludacris and Snoop Dogg, as well as American singer Usher, was released on June 7, 2021. The remix came hours after Bieber performed the Justice track "Somebody" at the 2021 Juno Awards. Snoop Dogg teased a part of his verse a day before release through a Twitter exchange, questioning Bieber "where [he]'s been" before the latter asked the rest of his collaborators if they were "around tonight". It marks Bieber's first collaboration with Snoop Dogg; he had previously collaborated with Ludacris on the songs "Baby" and "All Around the World" and with Usher on "Somebody to Love".

Ludacris, Usher and Snoop Dogg take over most of the choruses and verses handled by Bieber, Caesar and Giveon in the original. Ludacris begins the remix with bars of adornment and love regarding his relationship: "I'm always gon' adore ya', kiss you and caress you / Anything just to spoil ya, gift ya', protect ya." Bieber slips in to sing the second verse and the chorus before handing it off to Usher, who "recounts an encounter with a woman from Decatur" and introduces "tight, breathy harmonies" into the third verse. As a resident of Atlanta, Usher also pays homage to his longtime home: "Wonder where she learn to bounce that booty / What's her secret? I bet her momma went to Freaknik." Snoop Dogg, who declares himself as the "ambassador of legalization", raps about the finest stuff coming out of California in the final verse: "Whole VIP smellin' like it's Christmas, you don't wanna miss this / California weed on 10, this hits different."

=== Reception ===
Rolling Stone's Jon Blistein felt that the guest artists were "a perfect fit" for the song's "slick and breezy beat". Mitch Findlay of HotNewHipHop believed that Ludacris and Usher brought new energy into the remix, while Snoop Dogg's charisma kept him engaging throughout his rapping. Robert Rowat from CBC Music called the remix "marvelous" and gave it a recommendation if one is "tire[d] of the original version". The Globe and Mail's Brad Wheeler referred to it as "a pungent remix". Tom Breihan of Stereogum found the remix to be musically uninteresting, but commented that "there's something fun about seeing [the featured artists] showing up on this song together". Clover Hope wrote for Pitchfork that "[a] smooth-as-ever Usher salvages the remix from transient houseguests Ludacris and Snoop Dogg" as he "add[s] lived-in harmonies to an already suave song".

== Release history ==
Release dates and formats for "Peaches"
Region	Date	Format(s)	Version	Label	Ref.
United States	March 30, 2021	Urban contemporary radio	Original	Def Jam	
Italy	April 9, 2021	Radio airplay	Original	Universal	
Various	June 7, 2021	Digital download; streaming	Remix	Def Jam	
Various	June 25, 2021	Digital download; streaming	Masterkraft remix	Def Jam	

== See also ==
- List of Billboard Global 200 number ones of 2021
- List of Billboard Hot 100 number ones of 2021
- List of Billboard Hot 100 number-one singles of the 2020s
- List of Canadian Hot 100 number-one singles of 2021
- List of number-one singles of 2021 (Australia)
- List of number-one singles of 2021 (Ireland)
- List of number-one singles from the 2020s (New Zealand)
- List of number-one songs of 2021 (Singapore)
