= Billboard Year-End Global 200 singles of 2021 =

Worldwide music chart

The Billboard Global 200 and Global Excl. US are charts that ranks the best-performing singles globally and globally excluding the United States, respectively. Its data is published by Billboard weekly and based collectively on each single's weekly physical and digital sales, as well as streaming. At the end of a year, Billboard publishes an annual list of the 200 most successful songs throughout that year on the Global 200 and Global Excl. US charts based on the information. For 2021, its first year, the list was published on December 2, calculated with data from November 21, 2020, to November 13, 2021.

== Year-end list ==
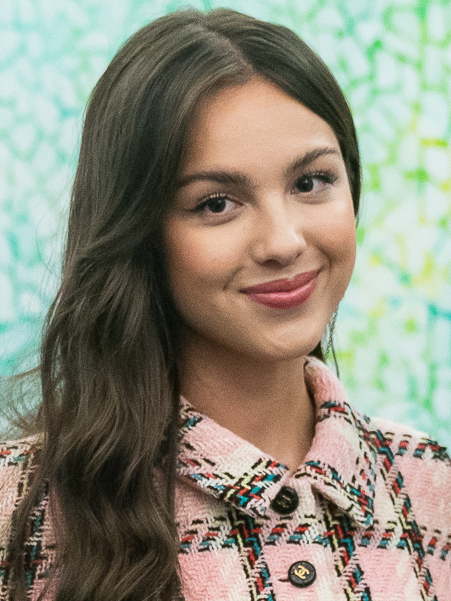
Olivia Rodrigo's (pictured) Sour album had eight entries on the Global 200 year-end list.

List of songs on Billboard's 2021 Year-End Global 200 charts
No.	Billboard Global 200		Billboard Global Excl. U.S.	
No.	Title	Artist(s)	Title	Artist(s)
1	"Levitating"	Dua Lipa	"Dynamite"	BTS
2	"Save Your Tears"	The Weeknd and Ariana Grande	"Save Your Tears"	The Weeknd and Ariana Grande
3	"Blinding Lights"	The Weeknd	"Levitating"	Dua Lipa
4	"Drivers License"	Olivia Rodrigo	"Blinding Lights"	The Weeknd
5	"Dynamite"	BTS	"Butter"	BTS
6	"Dakiti"	Bad Bunny and Jhay Cortez	"Dakiti"	Bad Bunny and Jhay Cortez
7	"Montero (Call Me by Your Name)"	Lil Nas X	"Stay"	The Kid Laroi and Justin Bieber
8	"Stay"	The Kid Laroi and Justin Bieber	"Montero (Call Me by Your Name)"	Lil Nas X
9	"Good 4 U"	Olivia Rodrigo	"Drivers License"	Olivia Rodrigo
10	"Mood"	24kGoldn featuring Iann Dior	"Peaches"	Justin Bieber featuring Daniel Caesar and Giveon
11	"Peaches"	Justin Bieber featuring Daniel Caesar and Giveon	"Bad Habits"	Ed Sheeran
12	"Butter"	BTS	"Mood"	24kGoldn featuring Iann Dior
13	"Kiss Me More"	Doja Cat featuring SZA	"Good 4 U"	Olivia Rodrigo
14	"Astronaut in the Ocean"	Masked Wolf	"The Business"	Tiësto
15	"Bad Habits"	Ed Sheeran	"Astronaut in the Ocean"	Masked Wolf
16	"Leave the Door Open"	Silk Sonic (Bruno Mars and Anderson .Paak)	"Beggin'"	Måneskin
17	"Heat Waves"	Glass Animals	"Kiss Me More"	Doja Cat featuring SZA
18	"Without You"	The Kid Laroi	"Dance Monkey"	Tones and I
19	"Positions"	Ariana Grande	"Hawái"	Maluma
20	"The Business"	Tiësto	"Watermelon Sugar"	Harry Styles
21	"34+35"	Ariana Grande	"Positions"	Ariana Grande
22	"Dance Monkey"	Tones and I	"Head & Heart"	Joel Corry and MNEK
23	"Watermelon Sugar"	Harry Styles	"Leave the Door Open"	Silk Sonic (Bruno Mars and Anderson .Paak)
24	"Hawái"	Maluma	"Yoru ni Kakeru"	Yoasobi
25	"Beggin'"	Måneskin	"Todo de Ti"	Rauw Alejandro
26	"Industry Baby"	Lil Nas X and Jack Harlow	"Without You"	The Kid Laroi
27	"Deja Vu"	Olivia Rodrigo	"Friday"	Riton and Nightcrawlers featuring Mufasa and Hypeman
28	"Someone You Loved"	Lewis Capaldi	"Goosebumps"	Travis Scott and HVME
29	"Perfect"	Ed Sheeran	"Someone You Loved"	Lewis Capaldi
30	"Don't Start Now"	Dua Lipa	"Heat Waves"	Glass Animals
31	"Lemonade"	Internet Money and Gunna featuring Don Toliver and Nav	"Perfect"	Ed Sheeran
32	"Goosebumps"	Travis Scott and HVME	"Don't Start Now"	Dua Lipa
33	"Todo de Ti"	Rauw Alejandro	"Industry Baby"	Lil Nas X and Jack Harlow
34	"You Broke Me First"	Tate McRae	"Wellerman"	Nathan Evans
35	"Roses"	Saint Jhn	"Fiel"	Los Legendarios, Wisin and Jhay Cortez
36	"Streets"	Doja Cat	"Bichota"	Karol G
37	"Savage Love (Laxed – Siren Beat)"	Jawsh 685 and Jason Derulo	"Shape of You"	Ed Sheeran
38	"Head & Heart"	Joel Corry and MNEK	"Savage Love (Laxed – Siren Beat)"	Jawsh 685 and Jason Derulo
39	"Heartbreak Anniversary"	Giveon	"Roses"	Saint Jhn
40	"For the Night"	Pop Smoke featuring Lil Baby and DaBaby	"AM"	Nio García, J Balvin and Bad Bunny
41	"Sunflower (Spider-Man: Into the Spider-Verse)"	Post Malone and Swae Lee	"Permission to Dance"	BTS
42	"WAP"	Cardi B featuring Megan Thee Stallion	"34+35"	Ariana Grande
43	"Yonaguni"	Bad Bunny	"La Noche de Anoche"	Bad Bunny and Rosalía
44	"Shape of You"	Ed Sheeran	"Yonaguni"	Bad Bunny
45	"La Noche de Anoche"	Bad Bunny and Rosalía	"I Wanna Be Your Slave"	Måneskin
46	"Rockstar"	DaBaby featuring Roddy Ricch	"Bandido"	Myke Towers and Juhn
47	"Rapstar"	Polo G	"Deja Vu"	Olivia Rodrigo
48	"Baby Shark"	Pinkfong	"You Broke Me First"	Tate McRae
49	"Friday"	Riton and Nightcrawlers featuring Mufasa and Hypeman	"Dry Flower"	Yuuri
50	"Fiel"	Los Legendarios, Wisin and Jhay Cortez	"Baby Shark"	Pinkfong
51	"What You Know Bout Love"	Pop Smoke	"Shallow"	Lady Gaga and Bradley Cooper
52	"Whoopty"	CJ	"Believer"	Imagine Dragons
53	"Believer"	Imagine Dragons	"La Curiosidad"	DJ Nelson Presenta Jay Wheeler and Myke Towers
54	"Up"	Cardi B	"Pepas"	Farruko
55	"Yoru ni Kakeru"	Yoasobi	"Bad Guy"	Billie Eilish
56	"Therefore I Am"	Billie Eilish	"Your Love (9PM)"	ATB, Topic and A7S
57	"AM"	Nio García, J Balvin and Bad Bunny	"Lovely"	Billie Eilish and Khalid
58	"Bad Guy"	Billie Eilish	"Señorita"	Shawn Mendes and Camila Cabello
59	"Traitor"	Olivia Rodrigo	"Before You Go"	Lewis Capaldi
60	"Before You Go"	Lewis Capaldi	"Qué Más Pues?"	J Balvin and María Becerra
61	"Circles"	Post Malone	"Paradise"	Meduza and Dermot Kennedy
62	"Bichota"	Karol G	"Monster"	Yoasobi
63	"Shallow"	Lady Gaga and Bradley Cooper	"Pareja del Año"	Sebastián Yatra and Myke Towers
64	"Dreams"	Fleetwood Mac	"Memories"	Maroon 5
65	"Sweater Weather"	The Neighbourhood	"Lemonade"	Internet Money and Gunna featuring Don Toliver and Nav
66	"Wellerman"	Nathan Evans	"Therefore I Am"	Billie Eilish
67	"Whats Poppin"	Jack Harlow featuring DaBaby, Tory Lanez and Lil Wayne	"Love Tonight"	Shouse
68	"Need to Know"	Doja Cat	"Life Goes On"	BTS
69	"Lovely"	Billie Eilish and Khalid	"Arcade"	Duncan Laurence
70	"Pepas"	Farruko	"Sweater Weather"	The Neighbourhood
71	"Permission to Dance"	BTS	"Whoopty"	CJ
72	"Beautiful Mistakes"	Maroon 5 featuring Megan Thee Stallion	"Sunflower (Spider-Man: Into the Spider-Verse)"	Post Malone and Swae Lee
73	"Bandido"	Myke Towers and Juhn	"Despacito"	Luis Fonsi and Daddy Yankee featuring Justin Bieber
74	"Old Town Road"	Lil Nas X featuring Billy Ray Cyrus	"911"	Sech and Jhay Cortez
75	"Calling My Phone"	Lil Tjay featuring 6lack	"I Don't Care"	Ed Sheeran and Justin Bieber
76	"I Wanna Be Your Slave"	Måneskin	"Breaking Me"	Topic and A7S
77	"Wants and Needs"	Drake featuring Lil Baby	"Ride It"	Regard
78	"Good Days"	SZA	"All of Me"	John Legend
79	"Memories"	Maroon 5	"How You Like That"	Blackpink
80	"Señorita"	Shawn Mendes and Camila Cabello	"Prisoner"	Miley Cyrus featuring Dua Lipa
81	"Telepatía"	Kali Uchis	"Closer"	The Chainsmokers featuring Halsey
82	"Happier Than Ever"	Billie Eilish	"Love Nwantiti (Ah Ah Ah)"	CKay
83	"Arcade"	Duncan Laurence	"Traitor"	Olivia Rodrigo
84	"La Curiosidad"	DJ Nelson Presenta Jay Wheeler and Myke Towers	"Circles"	Post Malone
85	"Holy"	Justin Bieber featuring Chance the Rapper	"Reloj"	Rauw Alejandro and Anuel AA
86	"Best Friend"	Saweetie featuring Doja Cat	"Old Town Road"	Lil Nas X featuring Billy Ray Cyrus
87	"Bohemian Rhapsody"	Queen	"Jerusalema"	Master KG featuring Burna Boy and Nomcebo Zikode
88	"Closer"	The Chainsmokers featuring Halsey	"Heartbreak Anniversary"	Giveon
89	"Lonely"	Justin Bieber and Benny Blanco	"Happier Than Ever"	Billie Eilish
90	"All I Want for Christmas Is You"	Mariah Carey	"Gunjou"	Yoasobi
91	"All of Me"	John Legend	"Need to Know"	Doja Cat
92	"Qué Más Pues?"	J Balvin and María Becerra	"Bohemian Rhapsody"	Queen
93	"Hold On"	Justin Bieber	"Cold Heart (Pnau remix)"	Elton John and Dua Lipa
94	"Despacito"	Luis Fonsi and Daddy Yankee featuring Justin Bieber	"WAP"	Cardi B featuring Megan Thee Stallion
95	"Goosebumps"	Travis Scott	"Woman"	Doja Cat
96	"Pareja del Año"	Sebastián Yatra and Myke Towers	"Streets"	Doja Cat
97	"Anyone"	Justin Bieber	"Hecha Pa' Mi"	Boza
98	"Prisoner"	Miley Cyrus featuring Dua Lipa	"Hold On"	Justin Bieber
99	"Woman"	Doja Cat	"Beautiful Mistakes"	Maroon 5 featuring Megan Thee Stallion
100	"Say You Won't Let Go"	James Arthur	"Bed"	Joel Corry, Raye and David Guetta
101	"Willow"	Taylor Swift	"Holy"	Justin Bieber featuring Chance the Rapper
102	"Love Nwantiti (Ah Ah Ah)"	CKay	"Telepatía"	Kali Uchis
103	"Happier"	Olivia Rodrigo	"Lonely"	Justin Bieber and Benny Blanco
104	"Paradise"	Meduza and Dermot Kennedy	"Rockstar"	DaBaby featuring Roddy Ricch
105	"My Ex's Best Friend"	Machine Gun Kelly and Blackbear	"Counting Stars"	OneRepublic
106	"Ride It"	Regard	"Shivers"	Ed Sheeran
107	"Fancy Like"	Walker Hayes	"Homura"	LiSA
108	"Midnight Sky"	Miley Cyrus	"Body"	Russ Millions and Tion Wayne featuring ArrDee, E1, ZT, Bugzy Malone, Buni, Fivio Foreign and Darkoo
109	"Reloj"	Rauw Alejandro and Anuel AA	"Miénteme"	Tini and María Becerra
110	"Life Is Good"	Future featuring Drake	"Girl Like Me"	Black Eyed Peas and Shakira
111	"Don't Stop Believin'"	Journey	"Cheap Thrills"	Sia featuring Sean Paul
112	"Your Love (9PM)"	ATB, Topic and A7S	"Monster"	Shawn Mendes and Justin Bieber
113	"Smells Like Teen Spirit"	Nirvana	"Anyone"	Justin Bieber
114	"I Don't Care"	Ed Sheeran and Justin Bieber	"Thinking Out Loud"	Ed Sheeran
115	"911"	Sech and Jhay Cortez	"El Makinon"	Karol G and Mariah Angeliq
116	"Forever After All"	Luke Combs	"Botella Tras Botella"	Gera MX and Christian Nodal
117	"Cold Heart (Pnau remix)"	Elton John and Dua Lipa	"Something Just Like This"	The Chainsmokers and Coldplay
118	"Shivers"	Ed Sheeran	"Usseewa"	Ado
119	"Take Me to Church"	Hozier	"Midnight Sky"	Miley Cyrus
120	"Love Tonight"	Shouse	"Relación"	Sech, Daddy Yankee and J Balvin featuring Rosalía and Farruko
121	"Monster"	Shawn Mendes and Justin Bieber	"Rain on Me"	Lady Gaga and Ariana Grande
122	"Dior"	Pop Smoke	"Afterglow"	Ed Sheeran
123	"Rain on Me"	Lady Gaga and Ariana Grande	"Boy with Luv"	BTS featuring Halsey
124	"Thinking Out Loud"	Ed Sheeran	"Kaikai Kitan"	Eve
125	"Way 2 Sexy"	Drake featuring Future and Young Thug	"Take On Me"	A-ha
126	"Hotel California"	Eagles	"Wake Me Up"	Avicii
127	"Easy on Me"	Adele	"Take Me to Church"	Hozier
128	"Say So"	Doja Cat	"Cover Me in Sunshine"	Pink and Willow Sage Hart
129	"Breaking Me"	Topic and A7S	"What You Know Bout Love"	Pop Smoke
130	"Favorite Crime"	Olivia Rodrigo	"Take You Dancing"	Jason Derulo
131	"Laugh Now Cry Later"	Drake featuring Lil Durk	"My Universe"	Coldplay and BTS
132	"We're Good"	Dua Lipa	"Rasputin"	Majestic and Boney M.
133	"Life Goes On"	BTS	"Say You Won't Let Go"	James Arthur
134	"Something Just Like This"	The Chainsmokers and Coldplay	"All I Want for Christmas Is You"	Mariah Carey
135	"You Right"	Doja Cat and the Weeknd	"Up"	Cardi B
136	"Counting Stars"	OneRepublic	"Yellow"	Coldplay
137	"On Me"	Lil Baby	"Another Love"	Tom Odell
138	"Leave Before You Love Me"	Marshmello and Jonas Brothers	"Baila Conmigo"	Selena Gomez and Rauw Alejandro
139	"Girl Like Me"	Black Eyed Peas and Shakira	"Vida de Rico"	Camilo
140	"Botella Tras Botella"	Gera MX and Christian Nodal	"Easy on Me"	Adele
141	"Monster"	Yoasobi	"My Head & My Heart"	Ava Max
142	"Sweet Child o' Mine"	Guns N' Roses	"Cry Baby"	Official Hige Dandism
143	"Last Christmas"	Wham!	"Happier"	Olivia Rodrigo
144	"El Makinon"	Karol G and Mariah Angeliq	"La Toxica"	Farruko
145	"Adore You"	Harry Styles	"Break My Heart"	Dua Lipa
146	"Take My Breath"	The Weeknd	"We're Good"	Dua Lipa
147	"Relación"	Sech, Daddy Yankee and J Balvin featuring Rosalía and Farruko	"La Nota"	Manuel Turizo, Myke Towers and Rauw Alejandro
148	"Go Crazy"	Chris Brown and Young Thug	"Take My Breath"	The Weeknd
149	"Back in Blood"	Pooh Shiesty featuring Lil Durk	"Every Breath You Take"	The Police
150	"Kings & Queens"	Ava Max	"Neko"	Dish
151	"Intentions"	Justin Bieber featuring Quavo	"Willow"	Taylor Swift
152	"Afterglow"	Ed Sheeran	"Little Bit of Love"	Tom Grennan
153	"Volví"	Aventura and Bad Bunny	"Kings & Queens"	Ava Max
154	"My Universe"	Coldplay and BTS	"Zitti e buoni"	Måneskin
155	"Brutal"	Olivia Rodrigo	"Volví"	Aventura and Bad Bunny
156	"Talking to the Moon"	Bruno Mars	"Love Not War (The Tampa Beat)"	Jason Derulo and Nuka
157	"Jealousy, Jealousy"	Olivia Rodrigo	"2/Catorce"	Rauw Alejandro and Mr. Nasgai
158	"Ain't Shit"	Doja Cat	"Mi Nina"	Los Legendarios, Wisin and Myke Towers
159	"My Head & My Heart"	Ava Max	"Iko Iko (My Bestie)"	Justin Wellington featuring Small Jam
160	"Miénteme"	Tini and María Becerra	"Volando"	Mora, Bad Bunny and Sech
161	"Bed"	Joel Corry, Raye and David Guetta	"Heartbreak Anthem"	Galantis, David Guetta and Little Mix
162	"The Box"	Roddy Ricch	"Adore You"	Harry Styles
163	"Cover Me in Sunshine"	Pink and Willow Sage Hart	"Last Christmas"	Wham!
164	"Body"	Megan Thee Stallion	"Life Is Good"	Future featuring Drake
165	"Beat Box"	SpotemGottem featuring Pooh Shiesty or DaBaby	"Rapstar"	Polo G
166	"Sicko Mode"	Travis Scott	"Say So"	Doja Cat
167	"Fair Trade"	Drake featuring Travis Scott	"Money"	Lisa
168	"Knife Talk"	Drake featuring 21 Savage and Project Pat	"Build a Bitch"	Bella Poarch
169	"Rockin' Around the Christmas Tree"	Brenda Lee	"Chica Ideal"	Sebastián Yatra and Guaynaa
170	"Girls Want Girls"	Drake featuring Lil Baby	"The Nights"	Avicii
171	"Yellow"	Coldplay	"Leave Before You Love Me"	Marshmello and Jonas Brothers
172	"Take You Dancing"	Jason Derulo	"Golden"	Harry Styles
173	"Body"	Russ Millions and Tion Wayne featuring ArrDee, E1, ZT, Bugzy Malone, Buni, Fivio Foreign and Darkoo	"Batom de Cereja"	Israel & Rodolffo
174	"Build a Bitch"	Bella Poarch	"Tiroteo"	Marc Seguí, Pol Granch, Rauw Alejandro
175	"Lucid Dreams"	Juice Wrld	"Un Día (One Day)"	J Balvin, Dua Lipa, Bad Bunny and Tainy
176	"Death Bed"	Powfu featuring Beabadoobee	"Lalisa"	Lisa
177	"Hecha Pa' Mi"	Boza	"Sobrio"	Maluma
178	"Baila Conmigo"	Selena Gomez and Rauw Alejandro	"In da Getto"	J Balvin and Skrillex
179	"What's Next"	Drake	"Run"	OneRepublic
180	"Another Love"	Tom Odell	"Kirari"	Fujii Kaze
181	"Break My Heart"	Dua Lipa	"Calling My Phone"	Lil Tjay featuring 6lack
182	"Jingle Bell Rock"	Bobby Helms	"Love Again"	Dua Lipa
183	"Dry Flower"	Yuuri	"In Your Eyes"	The Weeknd
184	"Jerusalema"	Master KG featuring Burna Boy and Nomcebo Zikode	"Runaway"	Aurora
185	"How You Like That"	Blackpink	"Physical"	Dua Lipa
186	"Highest in the Room"	Travis Scott	"Bebe"	Camilo and El Alfa
187	"Mood Swings"	Pop Smoke featuring Lil Tjay	"At My Worst"	Pink Sweats featuring Kehlani
188	"Love Again"	Dua Lipa	"Death Bed"	Powfu featuring Beabadoobee
189	"Holiday"	Lil Nas X	"Dreams"	Fleetwood Mac
190	"Golden"	Harry Styles	"Good Days"	SZA
191	"Volando"	Mora, Bad Bunny and Sech	"Caramelo"	Ozuna, Karol G and Myke Towers
192	"Run"	OneRepublic	"I Can't Stop Me"	Twice
193	"2/Catorce"	Rauw Alejandro and Mr. Nasgai	"Ella No Es Tuya"	Rochy RD, Myke Towers and Nicki Nicole
194	"Thunderstruck"	AC/DC	"Follow You"	Imagine Dragons
195	"Essence"	Wizkid featuring Justin Bieber and Tems	"Ram Pam Pam"	Natti Natasha and Becky G
196	"Follow You"	Imagine Dragons	"Smells Like Teen Spirit"	Nirvana
197	"Starboy"	The Weeknd featuring Daft Punk	"Photograph"	Ed Sheeran
198	"In da Getto"	J Balvin and Skrillex	"Gangsta's Paradise"	Coolio featuring L.V.
199	"La Toxica"	Farruko	"Baby Me Atende"	Matheus Fernandes and Dilsinho
200	"La Nota"	Manuel Turizo, Myke Towers and Rauw Alejandro	"Odo"	Ado

== See also ==
- 2021 in music
- List of Billboard Global 200 number ones of 2021
