= Hold On (Justin Bieber song) =

2021 single by Justin Bieber

Single by Justin Bieber

from the album Justice
- Released: March 5, 2021
- Genre: Synth-pop
- Length: 2:50
- Label: Def Jam
- Songwriters: Justin Bieber; Andrew Wotman; Louis Bell; Jonathan Bellion; Ali Tamposi; Walter De Backer; Luiz Bonfá
- Producers: Andrew Watt; Bell

Justin Bieber singles chronology
"Anyone" (2021)	"Hold On" (2021)	"Peaches" (2021)

Music video
- "Hold On" on YouTube

"Hold On" is a song by Canadian singer Justin Bieber. It was released through Def Jam Recordings as the fourth single from his sixth studio album, Justice, on March 5, 2021. Bieber wrote the song with producers Andrew Watt and Louis Bell, alongside Jon Bellion and Ali Tamposi. "Hold On" interpolates Gotye's 2011 single, "Somebody That I Used to Know", which was written by himself and Luiz Bonfá; therefore, Gotye and Bonfá are given songwriting credits on the song. A music video starring Bieber and Christine Ko was released alongside the song. The single has reached the top ten in twelve countries worldwide and has reached number four on the Billboard Global 200 chart.

== Background and release ==
Justin Bieber released the singles "Holy" and "Lonely" in 2020, followed by "Anyone" in January 2021. He announced his sixth studio album, Justice, the following month. Its track "Hold On" was written by Bieber, Ali Tamposi, Jon Bellion, and producers Andrew Watt and Louis Bell. The song interpolates "Somebody That I Used to Know" (2011), written by Walter De Backer and Luiz Bonfá, who thus receive official songwriting credits.

Def Jam Recordings released "Hold On" as a single for digital download and streaming in various countries on March 5, 2021. The same day, Universal Music Group serviced the song to contemporary hit radio stations in Italy. British radio station BBC Radio 1 added it to rotation on March 12, followed by its sister station BBC Radio 2 the next day.

== Composition and lyrics ==
"Hold On" is a mid-tempo synth-pop song that contains a driving pop rock beat and new wave elements. The song is set in the key of C♯ minor. Chris DeVille from Stereogum wrote that the song "delve[s] into the synth-powered side of '80s rock". The song's two verses have light synths laid down before eventually transitioning to a punchy chorus where the music drops and the percussion takes over, all layering under Bieber's vocals. Roisin O'Connor of The Independent stated that the song's synths faintly recall Alphaville's "Forever Young", while its bassline is in the style of Fleetwood Mac. "Hold On" is about keeping faith during difficult and challenging times, with lyrics touching on Bieber's struggles with the spotlight over the years. In the chorus, Bieber promises that "Heaven is a place not too far away" and admits to "know[ing] how it feels to be someone who loses their way". Rachel Simon, writing for NBC Think, opined that on the track, Bieber "offers himself up as an example of how people can change for the better" and "act[s] as the support system his younger self wasn't lucky enough to have".

== Commercial performance ==
"Hold On" debuted at number seven on the Canadian Hot 100 issued for March 20, 2021. The song peaked at number four in its third week on the chart. On the US Billboard Hot 100, it reached number 20. "Hold On" charted at number 10 on the UK Singles Chart. In Australia, the song peaked at number six and went triple Platinum. It reached number seven in New Zealand. "Hold On" peaked within the top 10 of national record charts, at number two in Denmark, number six in Malaysia, Singapore, number seven in Norway, number eight in Ireland, and number nine in Belgium, the Netherlands.

== Critical reception ==
"Hold On" received critical acclaim by music critics. Crimson staff writer Angelina Shoemaker praised the track for "[refreshing] listeners with its straightforward message." This message, according to Shoemaker, "touches on an emotion close to many". Shoemaker also noted the musical rhythm and melody as a form of communication of feelings, with the feeling of loneliness conveyed by the track's "slow-wave rhythm" and the "expressive quality of his voice."

A review at The Musical Hype on March 8, 2021, three days after the track's release, rated the song 3.5 stars out of 5, and praised the lyrical content for offering "encouragement and support", as well as praising Bieber's messaging and writing and singing performance, stating that Bieber "sounds smooth and performs expressively". The reviewer's overall opinion of the song is largely positive, calling it a "winner for Justin Bieber."

Music blogger Thomas Bleach, who had previously reviewed other works of Bieber such as "Holy" and "Lonely", praised the message of hope and reassurance and enlightenment in the track's lyrics, noting its structural parallels to Gotye's 2011 top-hit "Somebody That I Used to Know", and further going on to praise Bieber's vocals. Overall, Thomas rates the song positively, and rates the song as a "strong and decisive moment", contrasting it to Changes, which Thomas rated negatively by calling it "monotonous."

== Music video ==
Colin Tilley directed the music video for "Hold On", which stars Bieber and Taiwanese-American actress Christine Ko. Bieber shared a teaser of the clip on Instagram ahead of its release, followed by a livestream celebrating its release. It premiered at midnight on March 5, 2021. The video begins with policemen chasing Bieber and successfully shooting him, followed by a flashback. It is then revealed Bieber is trying to arrange money to pay Ko's medical bills, as her character is suffering from cancer. He spray paints a gun and resolves to steal money from a bank.

== Live performances ==
Bieber performed "Hold On" during his Tiny Desk Concert, which premiered online on March 17, 2021. The next day, he performed the song on The Late Late Show with James Corden, with a backing band, surrounded by the image of a winding road projected on a green screen. Bieber performed it at Good Morning America on March 22; Justin Curto of Vulture stated that Bieber "rocked the distanced GMA stage, jumping around and playing off his band's energy". Three days later, he released the official Vevo Live performance for "Hold On", which was held in a deserted forest in Los Angeles amid red mood lighting and green and white lightning. Bieber "dance[d] and [ran]" during it, backed by two guitarists, a keyboardist, and a live drummer. In May 2, he performed the song on Big Brother Brasil 21.

== Credits and personnel ==
Credits adapted from Tidal.

- Justin Bieber – lead vocals, backing vocals, songwriting
- Andrew Watt – songwriting, production, backing vocals, bass, guitar
- Louis Bell – songwriting, production, backing vocals, programming
- Ali Tamposi – songwriting, backing vocals
- Jon Bellion – songwriting, backing vocals
- Luiz Bonfa – songwriting
- Walter De Backer – songwriting
- Colin Leonard – mastering
- Josh Gudwin – mixing
- Heidi Wang – assistant mixing
- Devin Nakao – recording
- Paul LaMalfa – recording

== Charts ==
=== Weekly charts ===
Weekly chart performance for "Hold On"
Chart (2021)	Peak position
Argentina Hot 100 (Billboard)	74
Australia (ARIA)	6
Austria (Ö3 Austria Top 40)	13
Belgium (Ultratop 50 Flanders)	9
Canada Hot 100 (Billboard)	4
Canada AC (Billboard)	37
Canada CHR/Top 40 (Billboard)	12
Canada Hot AC (Billboard)	21
Croatia (HRT)	15
Czech Republic Airplay (ČNS IFPI)	56
Czech Republic Singles Digital (ČNS IFPI)	13
Denmark (Tracklisten)	2
France (SNEP)	100
Germany (GfK)	18
Global 200 (Billboard)	4
Greece (IFPI)	22
Hungary (Single Top 40)	15
Hungary (Stream Top 40)	16
Iceland (Tónlistinn)	32
Ireland (IRMA)	8
Japan Hot 100 (Billboard)	68
Lithuania (AGATA)	20
Malaysia (RIM)	6
Mexico (Billboard Mexican Airplay)	23
Netherlands (Dutch Top 40)	9
Netherlands (Single Top 100)	6
New Zealand (Recorded Music NZ)	7
Norway (VG-lista)	7
Peru (UNIMPRO)	113
Portugal (AFP)	28
Portugal Airplay (AFP)	89
San Marino (SMRRTV Top 50)	48
Singapore (RIAS)	6
Slovakia Airplay (ČNS IFPI)	22
Slovakia Singles Digital (ČNS IFPI)	4
South Korea (Gaon)	132
Spain (Promusicae)	76
Sweden (Sverigetopplistan)	14
Switzerland (Schweizer Hitparade)	16
UK Singles (OCC)	10
US Billboard Hot 100	20
US Adult Pop Airplay (Billboard)	40
US Pop Airplay (Billboard)	22
Venezuela (Record Report)	39

=== Year-end charts ===
Year-end chart performance for "Hold On"
Chart (2021)	Position
Australia (ARIA)	44
Belgium (Ultratop Flanders)	82
Canada (Canadian Hot 100)	34
Croatia (HRT)	89
Denmark (Tracklisten)	42
Global 200 (Billboard)	93
Netherlands (Dutch Top 40)	75
Netherlands (Single Top 100)	85
Portugal (AFP)	181

== Certifications ==
Certifications for "Hold On"
Region	Certification	Certified units/sales
Australia (ARIA)	3× Platinum	210,000^{‡}
Brazil (Pro-Música Brasil)	Diamond	160,000^{‡}
Canada (Music Canada)	2× Platinum	160,000^{‡}
Denmark (IFPI Danmark)	Platinum	90,000^{‡}
France (SNEP)	Gold	100,000^{‡}
Italy (FIMI)	Gold	50,000^{‡}
Mexico (AMPROFON)	Platinum	140,000^{‡}
New Zealand (RMNZ)	2× Platinum	60,000^{‡}
Norway (IFPI Norway)	Platinum	60,000^{‡}
Poland (ZPAV)	Gold	25,000^{‡}
Portugal (AFP)	Gold	5,000^{‡}
Spain (Promusicae)	Gold	30,000^{‡}
United Kingdom (BPI)	Gold	400,000^{‡}
United States (RIAA)	Platinum	1,000,000^{‡}
Streaming
Sweden (GLF)	Gold	4,000,000^{†}
^{‡} Sales+streaming figures based on certification alone.^{†} Streaming-only figures based on certification alone.

== Release history ==
Release dates and formats for "Hold On"
Region	Date	Format(s)	Label	Ref.
Various	March 5, 2021	Digital download; streaming	Def Jam	
Italy	March 5, 2021	Radio airplay	Universal	
