= Volando =

2021 song by Mora

Song by Mora

from the album Primer Día de Clases
- Language: Spanish
- Released: February 5, 2021
- Genre: Dancehall pop
- Length: 3:08
- Label: Rimas
- Songwriter: Gabriel Mora Quintero
- Producer: Sky

Music Audio
- "Mora - VOLANDO" on YouTube

"Volando (Remix)"

Single by Mora, Bad Bunny and Sech
- Language: Spanish
- Released: July 8, 2021
- Genre: Dancehall pop; Hip hop
- Length: 4:33
- Label: Rimas
- Songwriters: Carlos Isaías Morales Williams; Benito Martinez; Gabriel Mora Quintero
- Producer: Sky

Mora singles chronology
"3 de La Mañana" (2021)	"Volando (Remix)" (2021)	"Las Gargolas" (2021)

Bad Bunny singles chronology
"De Museo" (2021)	"Volando (Remix)" (2021)	"Volví" (2021)

Sech singles chronology
"Somos Iguales" (2021)	"Volando (Remix)" (2021)	"911 (Remix)" (2021)

Music video
- "Volando" (Remix) on YouTube

"Volando" (English: "Flying") is a song by Puerto Rican singer Mora from his debut studio album Primer Día de Clases (2022) and it was released on February 5, 2021, through Rimas Entertainment. A remix version of "Volando" featuring Puerto Rican rapper Bad Bunny and Panamanian singer Sech was made available worldwide on July 8, 2021 as a standalone single. Gabriel Mora Quintero wrote both the original version and its remix version with contributions from both Benito Martínez and Carlos Williams for the latter version. The production of the two versions were handled by a Colombian producer Sky.

== Critical reception ==
According to Billboard, the team of El Conejo noted Mora’s prowess at writing sweet lyrics and his keen eye for singable reggaeton vocals a few years ago. The remix of “Volando” is an appetizer of this blend — and Mora is not shy even among two of the most current Latin music heavyweight holders: Bad Bunny, with his wholehearted lines, and Sech, who brings an R&B soulfulness to the track. Producer Sky Rompiendo also does a great job grasping the emo and pop-punk comeback, creating the infusion of warm guitar riffs into the beat.

== Commercial performance ==
The remix version of "Volando" was a commercial success as it charted at number 3 in Spain and stayed there for 45 weeks. Also, it charted at number 89 on the Billboard Hot 100, number 7 on the Hot Latin Songs chart, number 29 on the Argentina Hot 100, number 19 in Bolivia, number 14 in Colombia and Ecuador, and number 20 in Peru.

== Music video ==
The music video for the remix of "Volando" was released on July 9, 2021 on Mora's YouTube channel.

== Charts ==
=== Weekly charts ===
Chart performance for "Volando (Remix)"
Chart (2021–2022)	Peak position
Argentina Hot 100 (Billboard)	29
Bolivia (Billboard)	19
Colombia (Billboard)	14
Ecuador (Billboard)	14
Global 200 (Billboard)	27
Peru (Billboard)	20
Spain (PROMUSICAE)	3
US Billboard Hot 100	89
US Hot Latin Songs (Billboard)	7

=== Year-end charts ===
Chart (2021)	Position
Global 200 (Billboard)	191
Spain (PROMUSICAE)	23
US Hot Latin Songs (Billboard)	47

== Certifications ==
Certifications and sales for "Volando (Remix)"
Region	Certification	Certified units/sales
Spain (PROMUSICAE)	6× Platinum	360,000^{‡}
^{‡} Sales+streaming figures based on certification alone.

== Release history ==
Release history and formats for "Volando (Remix)"
Region	Date	Format(s)	Label	Ref.
Various	July 8, 2021	Digital download; streaming	Rimas	
