= Hecha Pa' Mi =

2020 single by Boza

Single by Boza

from the album Más Negro que Rojo
- Released: November 20, 2020
- Genre: Dance-pop; reggaeton
- Length: 3:08
- Label: Sony Music Latin
- Songwriters: Humberto Ceballos Boza; Irving Quintero
- Producer: Faster

Boza singles chronology
| "Bandida" (2020) | "Hecha Pa' Mi" (2020) | "Bebe" (2021) |

Music video
- "Hecha Pa' Mi" on YouTube

"Hecha Pa' Mi" is a song by Panamanian singer Boza from his debut studio album Más Negro Que Rojo (2020). The song was written by Ceballos and Irving Quintero Valdez (Faster), and produced by the latter. The song was released as the second single from the album on November 20, 2020, alongside its official music video, which was directed by Cristian Aguilar. The song became a commercial success in Latin America, Spain and the United States after earning popularity on the video-sharing app TikTok.

== Commercial performance ==
Due to the popularity of the song on the video-sharing app TikTok, "Hecha Pa' Mi" gained international chart success, peaking at number one in Venezuela, and reaching the top-ten in twelve Latin American countries, including Colombia, Peru, Chile, Costa Rica and his native Panama. It also reached the top-twenty in Argentina, Paraguay, Ecuador and the Dominican Republic. "Hecha Pa' Mi" became Boza's first entry on the US Billboard Hot Latin Songs chart, peaking at number 36, earning his first top-40 single on the chart.

In Europe, "Hecha Pa' Mi" also performed well, peaking at number five in Spain and being certified two-times Platinum. The song also peaked at number nine in Italy and it was certified Gold. Additionally, it peaked at numbers 20 and 56 in Portugal and Switzerland, respectively.

== Charts ==
=== Weekly charts ===
| Chart (2020–2021) | Peak position |
|---|---|
| Argentina Hot 100 (Billboard) | 16 |
| Bolivia (Monitor Latino) | 8 |
| Chile (Monitor Latino) | 7 |
| Colombia (National-Report) | 3 |
| Costa Rica (Monitor Latino) | 6 |
| Dominican Republic (Monitor Latino) | 16 |
| Ecuador (Monitor Latino) | 13 |
| El Salvador (Monitor Latino) | 6 |
| Global 200 (Billboard) | 43 |
| Honduras (Monitor Latino) | 7 |
| Italy (FIMI) | 9 |
| Nicaragua (Monitor Latino) | 9 |
| Panama (Monitor Latino) | 4 |
| Paraguay (Monitor Latino) | 4 |
| Peru (Monitor Latino) | 3 |
| Portugal (AFP) | 20 |
| Spain (Promusicae) | 5 |
| Switzerland (Schweizer Hitparade) | 56 |
| Uruguay (Monitor Latino) | 8 |
| US Hot Latin Songs (Billboard) | 36 |
| Venezuela (Record Report) | 1 |

=== Monthly charts ===
| Chart (2021) | Position |
|---|---|
| Paraguay (SGP) | 11 |

=== Year-end charts ===
| Chart (2020) | Position |
|---|---|
| Panama (Monitor Latino) | 83 |

| Chart (2021) | Position |
|---|---|
| Bolivia (Monitor Latino) | 59 |
| Chile (Monitor Latino) | 11 |
| Costa Rica (Monitor Latino) | 16 |
| Dominican Republic (Monitor Latino) | 53 |
| El Salvador (Monitor Latino) | 27 |
| Global 200 (Billboard) | 177 |
| Guatemala (Monitor Latino) | 96 |
| Nicaragua (Monitor Latino) | 43 |
| Panama (Monitor Latino) | 10 |
| Paraguay (Monitor Latino) | 13 |
| Peru (Monitor Latino) | 6 |
| Portugal (AFP) | 48 |
| Uruguay (Monitor Latino) | 83 |

| Chart (2022) | Position |
|---|---|
| Panama (Monitor Latino) | 37 |

| Chart (2023) | Position |
|---|---|
| Panama (Monitor Latino) | 95 |

== Certifications ==
| Region | Certification | Certified units/sales |
|---|---|---|
| Brazil (Pro-Música Brasil) | Gold | 20,000^{‡} |
| Colombia | Gold | |
| Italy (FIMI) | 2× Platinum | 140,000^{‡} |
| Peru | 4× Platinum | |
| Portugal (AFP) | Platinum | 10,000^{‡} |
| Spain (Promusicae) | 3× Platinum | 120,000^{‡} |
| United States (RIAA) | 4× Platinum (Latin) | 240,000^{‡} |
Streaming
| Central America (CFC) | Diamond | 35,000,000^{†} |
^{‡} Sales+streaming figures based on certification alone.^{†} Streaming-only figures based on certification alone.
