= Volví =

2021 single by Aventura and Bad Bunny

Single by Aventura and Bad Bunny
- Language: Spanish
- English title: "I've Returned"
- Released: August 3, 2021
- Genre: Bachata; reggaeton; merengue; pop; ballad
- Length: 3:50
- Label: Rimas
- Songwriters: Alex Killer; Benito Martinez; Romeo Santos
- Producer: Alex Killer

Aventura singles chronology
"Inmortal" (2019)	"Volví" (2021)	"Brindo Con Agua" (2024)

Bad Bunny singles chronology
"Volando (Remix)" (2021)	"Volví" (2021)	"Lo Siento BB:/" (2021)

Music video
- "Volví" on YouTube

"Volví" (English: "I came back/I've returned") is a song by the American bachata group Aventura and Puerto Rican rapper Bad Bunny. It was released on August 3, 2021, by Rimas Entertainment. "Volví" blends bachata and reggaeton, with a merengue típico outro, along with some elements of pop and ballad. It reached number 22 on the US Billboard Hot 100, becoming the group's highest-charting song in the country.

== Background and composition ==
In early August 2021, Aventura shared a preview of the song on Twitter, announcing the collaboration, with Bad Bunny posting stills from the video as well as a photo of him with the members of Aventura on his Instagram page.

"Volví" combines bachata guitar licks with reggaeton drums. The outro is merengue típico, played on güira, tambora, and guitar. The lyrics feature themes of intimacy and jealousy, telling the story of a person who wants to come back with an ex.

== Reception ==
Zoe Haylock of Vulture.com commended the collaboration, "not just for bringing together crushes past and present but for combining the two genres from each country." In Remezcla, Jennifer Mota compared the genre blending to "Ella y Yo", by Aventura featuring Don Omar, "for today's pop audience".

Commercially, "Volví" reached number 22 on the US Billboard Hot 100, becoming the group's highest-charting song in the country. It also marked Aventura's third number-one on the US Hot Latin Songs, and first since "Dile al Amor" in 2010, while becoming Bad Bunny's ninth chart-topper. The song reached number 11 on the Billboard Global 200 chart.

== Music video ==
The music video was released on August 3, 2021, along with the song. In the video, Aventura and Bad Bunny perform the song on a "packed" dance floor, while a couple who dances together leaves for an intimate space at the end of the night.

== Live performance ==
On August 14, 2021, Aventura and Bad Bunny performed the song live for the first time at Hard Rock Stadium in Miami Gardens, Florida.

== Charts ==
=== Weekly charts ===
Weekly chart performance for "Volví"
Chart (2021–2022)	Peak position
Argentina Hot 100 (Billboard)	29
Bolivia (Billboard)	18
Canada Hot 100 (Billboard)	82
Chile (Billboard)	14
Colombia (Billboard)	23
Colombia (National-Report)	24
Costa Rica (Monitor Latino)	5
Dominican Republic (Monitor Latino)	1
Ecuador (Billboard)	12
El Salvador (Monitor Latino)	12
Global 200 (Billboard)	11
Honduras (Monitor Latino)	3
Mexico (Billboard)	15
Mexico Streaming (AMPROFON)	3
Nicaragua (Monitor Latino)	6
Panama (Monitor Latino)	13
Paraguay (Monitor Latino)	5
Paraguay (SGP)	9
Peru (Billboard)	9
Portugal (AFP)	72
Puerto Rico (Monitor Latino)	1
Slovakia Airplay (ČNS IFPI)	40
Spain (Promusicae)	3
Switzerland (Schweizer Hitparade)	24
US Billboard Hot 100	22
US Hot Latin Songs (Billboard)	1
US Latin Airplay (Billboard)	1
US Tropical Airplay (Billboard)	1
US Latin Rhythm Airplay (Billboard)	1
US Airplay (Monitor Latino)	19
Venezuela (Monitor Latino)	16

=== Year-end charts ===
2021 year-end chart performance for "Volví"
Chart (2021)	Position
Global 200 (Billboard)	153
Spain (PROMUSICAE)	26
US Hot Latin Songs (Billboard)	12
US Latin Airplay (Billboard)	26
US Latin Rhythm Airplay (Billboard)	20
US Tropical Airplay (Billboard)	5

2022 year-end chart performance for "Volví"
Chart (2022)	Position
Global 200 (Billboard)	179
US Hot Latin Songs (Billboard)	20
US Latin Airplay (Billboard)	26
US Latin Rhythm Airplay (Billboard)	13
US Tropical Airplay (Billboard)	2

== Certifications ==
Certifications for "Volví"
Region	Certification	Certified units/sales
Spain (Promusicae)	4× Platinum	240,000^{‡}
^{‡} Sales+streaming figures based on certification alone.

== See also ==
- List of Billboard number-one Latin songs of 2021
