= Justice (Justin Bieber album) =

- Standard edition cover (Note: The "Triple Chucks" deluxe edition cover features a greener overlay with the words "Triple Chucks" at the top, while the complete edition features a black and white overlay with the words "Complete Edition" at the top.)

Studio album by Justin Bieber
- Released: March 19, 2021
- Recorded: 2020–2021
- Genre: Pop
- Length: 45:26
- Label: Def Jam
- Producers: Aldae; Amy Allen; Andrew Watt; Benny Blanco; BMW Kenny; Capi; Darkchild; Dreamlab; DVLP; Finneas; German; Harv; Ido Zmishlany; Ilya; Jake Torrey; Jason Evigan; Jimmie Gutch; Jon Bellion; Jorgen Odegard; Josh Gudwin; KCdaProducer; LeriQ; Louis Bell; Marvin Hemmings; Michael Pollack; Mr. Franks; Phillip Ferrell II; Poo Bear; Rami Yacoub; Sasha Sirota; Shndo; Skrillex; The Futuristics; The Monsters & Strangerz; Tommy Brown; TroyBoi; Trackz

Justin Bieber chronology
Changes (2020)	Justice (2021)	Freedom (2021)

Singles from Justice
- 1. "Holy" Released: September 18, 2020; 2. "Lonely" Released: October 16, 2020; 3. "Anyone" Released: January 1, 2021; 4. "Hold On" Released: March 5, 2021; 5. "Peaches" Released: March 19, 2021; 6. "Ghost" Released: September 10, 2021

Justice is the sixth studio album by the Canadian singer Justin Bieber. It was released on March 19, 2021, by Def Jam Recordings. The album features guest appearances from Khalid, Chance the Rapper, the Kid Laroi, Dominic Fike, Daniel Caesar, Giveon, Beam, Burna Boy, and Benny Blanco. The "Triple Chucks" deluxe edition of the album was released on March 26, 2021, exactly a week after the standard version. It features additional guest appearances from Lil Uzi Vert, Jaden, Quavo, DaBaby, and Tori Kelly. The complete edition was released on October 8, 2021, and includes the tracks on store versions of the album that did not make the regular album. It features additional guest appearances from TroyBoi and Poo Bear. The album includes production from Benny Blanco himself, Virtual Riot, Andrew Watt, Skrillex, Finneas, Jon Bellion, the Monsters & Strangerz, and numerous others. It serves as the follow-up to Bieber's previous album, Changes (2020). Justice is a pop album.

The album was supported by six singles, including the US Billboard Hot 100 number-one "Peaches" and the top-ten singles: "Holy", "Anyone" and "Ghost". "Holy", which features Chance the Rapper, was released as the lead single on September 18, 2020. "Lonely", which is a joint track alongside Benny Blanco, was released as the second single on October 16, 2020. "Anyone" was released as the third single on January 1, 2021. "Hold On", was released as the fourth single on March 5, 2021. "Peaches", which features Daniel Caesar and Giveon, was released as the fifth single with the album on March 19, 2021. "Ghost" was released as the sixth single on September 10, 2021.

Justice debuted atop the charts of ten countries, including the US Billboard 200 and the Canadian Albums Chart. The fifth single "Peaches" simultaneously debuted atop the US Billboard Hot 100 and the Canadian Hot 100. In the United States, the peak of the album marked Bieber's eighth chart-topper, and made him the youngest solo artist to achieve as many number-one albums at 27 years old. Justice and "Peaches" both held the number-one spots on the respective charts simultaneously in the same week, making Bieber the first solo male artist and the third act overall to achieve this feat. The album is certified double-platinum by the Recording Industry Association of America (RIAA).

Upon release, the album received generally favourable reviews from music critics, most of whom complimented its production and vocal delivery, but deprecated its lyrics and "confusing" concept surrounding justice. The album contains elements of pop rock, synth-pop, and new wave. Bieber promoted the album with live performances on various television shows, such as Saturday Night Live, The Voice, The Late Late Show with James Corden, and Good Morning America. To support Justice and Changes, Bieber embarked on his fourth concert tour, titled Justice World Tour, across North America, Europe, and South America, in 2022. At the 64th Grammy Awards, the album and its singles received a total of eight nominations including Album, Song and Record of the Year; the latter two for "Peaches".

== Background ==
After releasing his fifth studio album, Changes (2020), Bieber was interviewed by Apple Music DJ Zane Lowe. Bieber said he was looking forward to making music that would reflect the things that he had learned about commitment and building trust.

On February 26, 2021, when Bieber announced the album, he stated: "There's so much [sic] deeper levels I'm excited to go to, which is fun. It gives me something to look forward to".

"In a time when there’s so much wrong with this broken planet, we all crave healing and justice for humanity. In creating this album my goal is to make music that will provide comfort, to make songs that people can relate to and connect to so they feel less alone. Suffering, injustice and pain can leave people feeling helpless. Music is a great way of reminding each other that we aren’t alone. Music can be a way to relate to one another and connect with one another. I know that I cannot simply solve injustice by making music but I do know that if we all do our part by using our gifts to serve this planet and each other that we are that much closer to being united. This is me doing a small part. My part. I want to continue the conversation of what justice looks like so we can continue to heal."

— Bieber describing the inspiration for his album Justice, Rolling Stone

Before the release of lead single "Holy", on September 18, 2020, Bieber and featured artist Chance the Rapper discussed Bieber's follow-up to Changes on a YouTube livestream, in which Chance said that it reminded him of Michael Jackson's fifth studio album, Off the Wall (1979), and said that the album is "some of the best music I've ever heard" and that it is "groundbreaking music".

== Recording ==
Early in the COVID-19 pandemic, when the singer was in quarantine at his house in Toronto, Bieber was sent a plethora of demos submitted to his management team by songwriters, managers, publishers and producers. Bieber recorded the songs he liked in his home studio and sent them back to his inner circle. Bieber revealed on April 10, 2020, during an Instagram Live that he had recorded a song called "Anyone", which would later be released as the album's third single. On April 18, 2020, on Instagram Stories, Bieber remarked his new album was sounding "crazy-good" in his opinion.

The recording of Justice intensified once Bieber got back to Los Angeles a couple of months later. While his latest record Changes was R&B oriented, for this record nothing was off limits. While hanging out at Andrew Watt's house with Shawn Mendes, Bieber started to write the hook of the song "Peaches". Watt showed Bieber around his home studio and said to him to "go play the drums" and after having recorded a drum beat, Bieber sat down at the piano and played some chords which they also recorded and looped. Then Watt recorded some bass and guitar and Bieber started free-styling and "just talking words back and forth for fun". After this session, Bieber asked Watt to send him the demo so he could work on it some more by himself. Bieber posted a snippet of the song on his Instagram account on September 7, 2020. Record producer Shndo later listened to it and decided to further produce the song. He screen-recorded the Instagram video, recorded some drums over it in the music software Ableton and decided to speed up the song. Shndo collaborated with music producer Harv, who added some more instruments to the song. They presented the song to Bieber who loved it and later re-recorded the hook and wrote a verse before sending it back to them to work on it some more. On the same day, Bieber contacted Giveon who accepted to be a part of the song while Daniel Caesar was later also asked to be a part of the track.

Initially, Bieber's team was not planning on releasing an album so soon and Bieber realised that they had an album's worth of material in December 2020. On January 22, 2021, Bieber shared an update on the new album on Instagram Stories. He wrote: "Finishing this album. Stay tuned." He also shared a picture of him singing in the studio. On January 26, 2021, Bieber wrote on Twitter that he was going over the track listing for the album.

== Songs ==
"Loved By You"
A sample of "Loved By You"

Craig Jenkins from Vulture noted that "the album zips through synth-pop, Soulection-esque funk, dancehall-tinged electronic dance music, and rock-infused Afrobeats".

According to AllMusic, "Justice is a decent addition to Bieber's catalog. It's distinguished by a variety of pop modes that includes vaporous Synth-rock and strumming acoustic ballads, Hip hop Gospel and bedroom EDM, and sun-dazed R&B and contemporary Afrobeat."

After Bieber ventured into a more R&B-oriented sound for Changes, Justice sees him return to his pop roots. Justice starts with the minimal dream pop track "2 Much" which contains Bieber's favourite line: "I don't wanna fall asleep, I'd rather fall in love". The second track, "Deserve You", has been described by Billboard and Bieber himself as a song that sounds like Phil Collins' work, and "striking 1980s power-ballad gold" funk and disco. "Off My Face" has been described as an acoustic ode to love which is stylistically comparable to his 2015 song "Love Yourself". The song includes soft-rock stylings and drunk-in-love double entendres. "Holy" was described as a "gospel-brunch rave-up". "Unstable" combines elements of piano ballads and 2000s country songs. The eighth track, "Die for You" featuring Dominic Fike, is an "MTV-friendly" new wave, funk, dance-pop, dream pop, glam rock and disco song. And ventures into pop-rock territory, a completely novel mode for Bieber. "Hold On" is a synth-pop song that was compared to Kim Carnes' "Bette Davis Eyes". Also “Hold On” and “Somebody” revisit new wave’s metamorphosis into sophisticated adult contemporary pop.

The sound of Skrillex-produced 80s rock "Somebody" was described as "a hyper-pop experiment" that is driven by a "snappy baseline". "Ghost", the eleventh track is a pop-rock song with shimmering electronic synthesizers. The twelfth track, "Peaches", which features Daniel Caesar and Giveon, is a pop-R&B song that has been compared to Bruno Mars' work. And on the breathless dance-pop track The next track, "Love You Different", which features Beam, is influenced by tropical house and Afrobeat, and has been compared to Bieber's 2015 single, "Sorry". The next track, "Loved by You", features Burna Boy and is influenced by afropop and dancehall.

== Promotion ==
=== Singles ===
For Justice, Bieber's management team tried out a new multi-single release strategy, which was to release multiple singles, which would later lead into a new album. Bieber's manager, Scooter Braun, came up with the idea in June 2020.

The lead single of the album "Holy", which features American rapper Chance the Rapper, was released on September 18, 2020. It debuted at number three on the US Billboard Hot 100 making it Bieber's 20th top 10 in the United States. Its music video was released on the same day and features Bieber as a laid-off oil worker and his partner being helped by a charitable soldier. It was directed by Colin Tilley and stars Wilmer Valderrama and Ryan Destiny.

The second single, "Lonely", a collaboration with American record producer Benny Blanco, was released on October 16, 2020. The track debuted at number 14 and peaked at number 12 on the US Billboard Hot 100 chart. Its music video premiered alongside the single. It was directed by American music video director Jake Schreier and stars Jacob Tremblay, who plays a younger version of Bieber. Bieber praised Jacob Tremblay for his talent, adding that he became emotional when he saw Tremblay play himself, while he acts as a spectator "from the outside looking in". In a livestream on Bieber's YouTube channel after the song's release, both Bieber and Blanco called Tremblay one of the best child actors they have ever seen. "The first time I watched him go through the segment... I legitimately lost it," Bieber said of witnessing Tremblay on set. "I was tearing up, like completely."

The third single, "Anyone", released on January 1, 2021. The track debuted and peaked at number six on the US Billboard Hot 100. The music video premiered alongside the single. It was directed by Colin Tilley and stars American actress Zoey Deutch who plays Bieber's love interest in the video. Bieber portrays a 1960s boxer whose powerful love for his other half inspires him to train, fight, and eventually overcome a potential K.O. on his journey to becoming a champion. For the music video, Bieber covered up all of his tattoos.

The fourth single, "Hold On", was released on March 5, 2021. The track debuted at number 26 and later peaked at number 20 on the Hot 100 chart. Its music video was released alongside the single and was directed by Colin Tilley. It stars Taiwanese actress Christine Ko who plays Bieber's love interest in the video. The video opens with Bieber on the run from the police, before suffering a gunshot wound. However, as the video flashes back, the viewer learns why Bieber is running from the police in the first place.

The fifth single, "Peaches", which features Canadian singer-songwriter Daniel Caesar and American singer-songwriter Giveon, was released alongside the album on March 19, 2021. The song debuted atop the Billboard Hot 100 chart, and became Bieber's seventh number one in the United States. Bieber also became the first solo male artist to debut at number one on the Billboard Hot 100 and Billboard 200 charts simultaneously. The song's music video premiered alongside the song and album. It was directed by Colin Tilley and sees the three artists cruising the Las Vegas Strip.

The sixth single, "Ghost", was sent to French radio stations on September 10, 2021. The song debuted at number 66 on the Billboard Hot 100 chart following the release of Justice and later peaked at number five after being released as a single. The music video, directed by Colin Tilley, premiered on October 8, 2021. Actress Diane Keaton stars as Bieber's grandmother in the video. The video sees Bieber and Keaton mourn the death of his grandfather at an ocean-side funeral. After two years, Bieber sees that Keaton is still struggling from her husband's passing, so he buys her expensive things and the two partake in activities together. The video ends with Bieber finding Keaton a new man who resembles her widower on a dating app called Slide and taking her to meet him, setting her up on a date with him.

=== Live performances ===
To promote the album and its singles, Bieber performed on several TV shows including Saturday Night Live, The Late Late Show with James Corden, and Good Morning America. Bieber debuted his singles "Holy" and "Lonely" during the third episode of the 46th season of Saturday Night Live, on October 18, 2020. The single "Anyone" was performed live for the first time during Bieber's New Year's Eve concert on January 1, 2021. On March 13, 2021, Bieber performed "Hold On" for the first time on the 2021' Kids Choice Awards. The fifth single "Peaches" was performed live for the first time two days before its official release, on March 17, 2021, during Bieber's first Tiny Desk concert.

Bieber performed a 15-minute livestream concert from the rooftop of a Paris hotel. The concert premiered on Bieber's YouTube channel on April 13, 2021. Directed by David Ctiborsky, the concert revealed Bieber and his live band performing on a roof at sunset, with landmarks like the Eiffel Tower visible in the background, and later in the halls of the hotel. During the concert the singer played several tracks from his Justice album, including "Hold On," "Somebody" and "Off My Face." The final track, "2 Much," brought Bieber back to the roof after night falls, with the Eiffel Tower glowing behind him.

=== Justin Bieber: Next Chapter ===
The documentary Next Chapter, directed by Michael D. Ratner, premiered on YouTube on October 30, 2020. It provided an intimate look at Bieber's life in quarantine and while recording Justice. While talking about the documentary, Bieber said: "I'm excited to catch up with [the fans] and to share the progress I'm making, the new music I'm working on, and what I'm excited about for the future."

=== Touring ===
After the release of his lead single "Yummy" from his fifth studio album Changes on January 3, 2020, Bieber announced the first round of dates for his new tour titled Changes Tour, on January 13, 2020. The tour was scheduled to begin on May 14, 2020, in Seattle at CenturyLink Field, but on April 1, 2020, it was announced that the tour would be postponed due to the COVID-19 pandemic. On July 23, 2020, Bieber announced rescheduled dates for the then called "Justin Bieber World Tour" slated for 2021, starting on June 2, 2021, in San Diego at Pechanga Arena. On May 6, 2021, Bieber announced rescheduled dates for the tour, now called "Justice World Tour". Bieber hit the road on February 18, 2022, at Pechanga Arena in San Diego and the tour ran through Las Vegas, Los Angeles, Salt Lake City, Denver, Atlanta, Montreal, Tampa, Austin, and more. Bieber said about the tour in a press release: “We’re working hard to make this tour the best one yet. I'm excited to get out there and engage with my fans again.” The tour officially started on February 18, 2022 in San Diego and ended on September 4, 2022, in Rio de Janeiro after Bieber needed to take a break from music and touring in order to focus on his health.

== Artwork ==
On January 14, 2021, Rory Kramer snapped 3,500 photos of Bieber across three Los Angeles locations. The cover was taken within the night's final 100 frames. In the definitive photo, Bieber is crouched in Downtown Los Angeles' 2nd Street Tunnel. His hand covers his left eye, while his right eye is introspectively closed. Bieber chose the picture to be the album cover in mid-January at his home in Los Angeles. In an interview with The Indianapolis Star, Kramer stated: "You saw how certain he was, he saw that vision. It was cool to witness, someone so excited about his project. It's cool to have the artist be super passionate about your photo. It's the ultimate compliment".

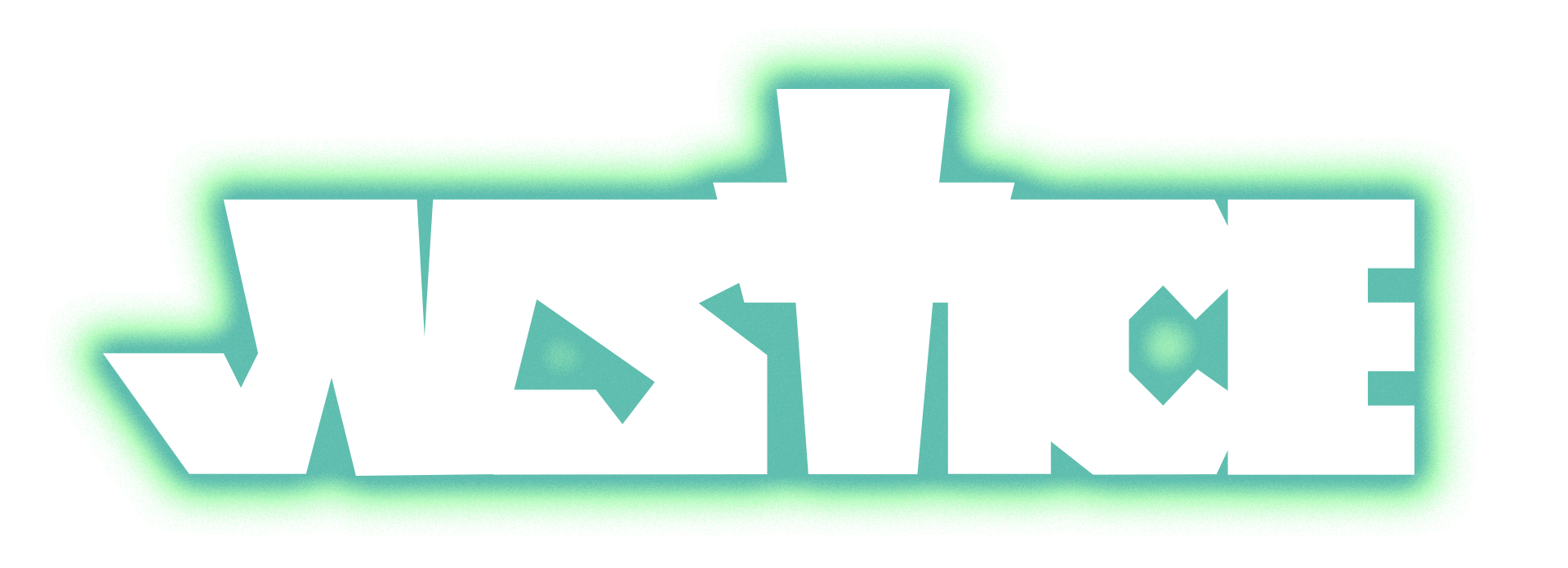
The ''Justice'' logo.

On February 26, 2021, when the album cover was revealed, the team of the French group Justice reacted to the album logo. According to Pedro Winter, founder and owner of French record label Ed Banger Records, the logo of the album, conceived by Bieber himself, is similar to the logo of Justice, who is signed to the label. On March 1, 2021, Winter reacted on Instagram by taking a screenshot of the logo drawn by Bieber and saying, satirically; "Ed Banger Records appoints Mr Justin Drew Bieber as Art Director. We would like to thank Mr So Me [the current artistic director of Ed Banger] for all his work since 2003". On March 18, Rolling Stone reported that Justice sent a cease and desist letter to Bieber over the album, citing willful trademark infringement over the Cross logo.

== Release ==
Bieber announced the release of the album on February 26, 2021. Along with the announcement, an EP titled JB6 was released for digital download and streaming. The EP includes the original versions of three of the already-released singles "Holy" (featuring Chance the Rapper), "Lonely" (with Benny Blanco) and "Anyone", as well as acoustic versions of the former two. Target and Walmart-exclusive CD versions of Justice were released alongside the original on March 19, 2021, and both include one additional song. Bieber revealed the track listing of the album on March 10, 2021. On March 16, 2021, Good Morning America announced that Bieber would debut a new music video on March 19. On March 19, 2021, Justice was released alongside a music video for the fifth single, "Peaches", which was directed by Colin Tilley. The video sees Bieber and featured artists Daniel Caesar and Giveon cruising the Las Vegas Strip. Justice (Triple Chucks Deluxe) with six new tracks was released on March 26, 2021 and features guest appearances from Jaden, Tori Kelly, Lil Uzi Vert and DaBaby.

== Critical reception ==
Professional ratings
Aggregate scores
Source	Rating
AnyDecentMusic?	6.0/10
Metacritic	62/100
Review scores
Source	Rating
AllMusic	3.5/5 stars
Clash	7/10
The Daily Telegraph	2/5 stars
Entertainment Weekly	B
The Guardian	2/5 stars
The Independent	4/5 stars
The Irish Times	4/5 stars
NME	4/5 stars
Pitchfork	7.2/10
Rolling Stone	2.5/5 stars

Justice received generally mixed to positive reviews from music critics. At Metacritic, which assigns a normalized rating out of 100 to reviews from mainstream publications, the album received an average score of 62, based on 16 reviews, indicating "generally favourable reviews".

Louise Bruton from The Irish Times described Justice as "undeniably good" and the singer's "poppiest yet", having Bieber "loosen up" musically. Roisin O'Connor, writing for The Independent, dubbed Justice the best album of Bieber's career, praised the evolution from his fifth studio album, Changes, and adored the musicianship of its tracks. In agreement, Will Lavin of NME felt that the album is an improvement from Changes. He asserted Justice is not a protest album, but contains "messages of hope, morality and standing for truth" nevertheless, where Bieber produces "powerful results" via personal experiences. Billboard writer Jason Lipshutz felt that Bieber "gains more artistic clarity" on Justice, as he attempts to "express a complex emotional state over the course of an album instead of jamming it into three minutes". He named it Bieber's "strongest front-to-back listen to date". PopMatters writer Ana Clara Ribeiro wrote that Justice evinces Bieber as a "pop music force", and contains traces of its predecessors, especially Purpose (2015).

Other reviews were more mixed. Leah Greenblatt of Entertainment Weekly felt that none of the tracks "have touched the heady heights" of Purpose singles like "Sorry" and "Where Are Ü Now", but thought Justice is full of "Husband Bops" and "respectable numbers". Evening Standard's David Smyth complimented the musical direction of the album but noted that Bieber "still doesn't have a great deal to say" lyrically. Reviewing for Clash, Robin Murray stated that Justice explores "hip hop to slick Billboard pop and beyond", however, its 16 tracks "can become a repetitive experience". Branding it "an earnest pop album", Pitchfork's Rawiya Kameir complimented Bieber's smooth and controlled vocals but deprecated the "rote" production and "spiritless" songwriting. She saw Justice exuding the same "charisma and agility" that drove Bieber to stardom, however, denounced justice as the album's theme, expressing uncertainty about "whether Bieber is singing about his wife or his god". Rosemary Akpan of Exclaim! dubbed Justice a "decent" album about his "wholesome" marital life, nonetheless regarded the album title "reeking performative activism". Craig Jenkins of Vulture wrote that "Bieber sounds better adjusted than ever, but the music he's made this time feels a little reserved". Jenkins opined that "the more chances Justice takes, the better the payoffs," but dismissed the collaborations with Khalid and The Kid Laroi. Jon Caramanica of The New York Times named the album one that is "disorganized, only sporadically strong" but complimented the collaborations "Unstable" and "Peaches". Writing for The Los Angeles Times, Mikael Wood opined that the album "feels out of sync with the rest of modern pop". He highlighted "Peaches," "Ghost," and "Die For You" as the record's best tracks, but felt that, the album. as a whole, "short-changes the hard-won storytelling talent that Bieber has cultivated."

Many critics found the placement of speeches by Martin Luther King Jr. in the album irrelevant in context. Variety's Chris Willman appreciated the album's production and Bieber's vocals, calling it an "unabashed, good pop album", but wondered "why anyone thought it was a good idea to conflate civil-right martyrdom with the thought of succumbing to a hot woman". The Guardian critic Alexis Petridis described the album as a set of love songs about Bieber's wife, contradicting the singer's description of the album—"justice for humanity". Questioning the lack of relation between the album's songs and King's speeches, Ali Shutler of The Daily Telegraph opined that the "loved-up" lyricism "almost exclusively" focuses on Bieber himself. Shutler dismissed the guest appearances from Khalid and Chance the Rapper as unexciting. Keith Harris of Rolling Stone termed Justice as "professionally crafted pop" with many "chart-validated" tracks. He compared the inclusion of King's speeches to the "hollow, non-committal feel of a brand-sponsored Black History Month tweet, a gesture best left unmade", and remarked that they "co-opt and trivialize the message of the man they profess to honor". In a negative review, Kitty Empire of The Observer criticized Bieber for "putting one of the greatest orators who ever lived on [the] album as a tone-deaf wheeze", and deemed the album "a new low" for the singer.

=== Year-end lists ===
Year-end rankings
Publication	List	Rank	Ref.
Billboard	The Best Albums of 2021	36	
Complex	The Best Albums of 2021	20	
CBC Music	The 21 Best Canadian Albums of 2021	6	

== Commercial performance ==
The album debuted atop the Billboard 200 chart, selling 154,000 equivalent album units in the United States in its first week and becoming Bieber's eighth number one album on the chart. As a 27-year-old at that time, Bieber became the youngest soloist with eight number one albums in the United States. On March 29, 2021, Justice was certified gold by the RIAA. The fifth single "Peaches", also debuted at number one in the same week, making Bieber the first solo male artist to debut at number one on the Billboard Hot 100 and Billboard 200 charts simultaneously. The album returned to the top on its third week, becoming his second album to spend multiple weeks at number one. The International Federation of the Phonographic Industry (IFPI) reported that Bieber was the world's eighth best-selling artist of 2021, bolstered by Justice.

== Track listing ==
Justice track listing
No.	Title	Writer(s)	Producer(s)	Length
1.	"2 Much"	Justin Bieber; Sonny Moore; Martin Luther King Jr.; Alexander Izquierdo; Valentin Brunn; Freddy Wexler; Josh Gudwin; Gregory Hein; Gian Stone	Skrillex	2:32
2.	"Deserve You"	Bieber; Andrew Wotman; Louis Bell; Jonathan Bellion; Michael Pollack; Ali Tamposi	Andrew Watt; Bell	3:07
3.	"As I Am" (featuring Khalid)	Bieber; Khalid Robinson; Jordan K. Johnson; Stefan Johnson; Oliver Peterhof; Gudwin; Ido Zmishlany; Scott Harris; Hein	The Monsters & Strangerz; German; Gudwin; Zmishlany^{[a]}	2:54
4.	"Off My Face"	Bieber; Daniel James; Leah Haywood; Jake Torrey; Tia Scola	Dreamlab; Torrey	2:36
5.	"Holy" (featuring Chance the Rapper)	Bieber; Chancelor Bennett; Bellion; Tommy Brown; Steven Franks; Jorgen Odegard; Pollack; Anthony M. Jones	Jon Bellion; Tommy Brown; Mr. Franks; Odegard; Pollack	3:32
6.	"Unstable" (featuring the Kid Laroi)	Bieber; Charlton Howard; James Gutch; Hein; Rami Yacoub; Britney Amardio; Billy Walsh; Ayden Szymczak	Jimmie Gutch; Aldae^{[b]}; Yacoub^{[b]}	2:38
7.	"MLK Interlude"	King		1:44
8.	"Die for You" (featuring Dominic Fike)	Bieber; Dominic Fike; Wotman; Bell; Bellion; Tamposi	Andrew Watt; Bell	3:18
9.	"Hold On"	Bieber; Wotman; Bell; Bellion; Tamposi; Walter de Backer; Luiz Bonfá	Andrew Watt; Bell	2:50
10.	"Somebody"	Bieber; Moore; Bernard Harvey; Ilya Salmanzadeh; Ryan Tedder; Yacoub; Gudwin; Hein	Skrillex; Harv; Ilya^{[a]}	3:00
11.	"Ghost"	Bieber; Bellion; J. Johnson; S. Johnson; Pollack	Bellion; The Monsters & Strangerz	2:33
12.	"Peaches" (featuring Daniel Caesar and Giveon)	Bieber; Ashton Simmonds; Giveon Evans; Harvey; Luis Martinez, Jr.; Wotman; Bell; Matthew Sean Leon; Felisha King-Harvey; Aaron Simmonds; Keavan Yazdani	Harv; Shndo^{[a]}	3:18
13.	"Love You Different" (featuring Beam)	Bieber; Tyshane Thompson; Marcus Lomax; Izquierdo; Peterhof; Whitney Phillips; Jordan Douglas	The Monsters & Strangerz; German; Gudwin	3:06
14.	"Loved by You" (featuring Burna Boy)	Bieber; Damini Ogulu; Moore; Jason Evigan; Amy Allen; Bellion	Skrillex; Evigan; LeriQ^{[b]}	2:39
15.	"Anyone"	Bieber; Wotman; Bellion; Izquierdo; J. Johnson; S. Johnson; Pollack; Raul Cubina	Andrew Watt; Bellion; The Monsters & Strangerz	3:10
16.	"Lonely" (with Benny Blanco)	Bieber; Benjamin Levin; Finneas O'Connell	Benny Blanco; Finneas	2:29
Total length:				45:26

Triple Chucks Deluxe edition bonus tracks
No.	Title	Writer(s)	Producer(s)	Length
17.	"There She Go" (featuring Lil Uzi Vert)	Bieber; Symere Woods; Rodney Jerkins; Marvin Hemmings; Antonio Kearney; Kameron Glasper; Thompson; Gudwin; Hein; Douglas	Darkchild; Hemmings; KCdaProducer	3:35
18.	"I Can't Be Myself" (featuring Jaden)	Bieber; Jaden Smith; Wotman; Bell; Bellion; Tamposi	Andrew Watt; Bell	3:13
19.	"Lifetime"	Bieber; Alex Schwartz; Joe Khajadourian; Pollack; Torrey; Scott Braun; Jace Jennings; Jacob Greenspan	The Futuristics; Pollack; Torrey	3:27
20.	"Wish You Would" (featuring Quavo)	Bieber; Quavious Marshall; Jason Boyd; Kenneth Coby; Kevin Coby	Poo Bear; BMW Kenny; Trackz	4:01
21.	"Know No Better" (featuring DaBaby)	Bieber; Jonathan Kirk; David Bowden; Bigram Zayas; Kevin Carbo	DVLP; Capi	2:41
22.	"Name" (featuring Tori Kelly)	Bieber; Victoria Kelly; J. Johnson; S. Johnson; Bellion; Allen	The Monsters & Strangerz; Bellion; Allen	2:39
Total length:				65:02

Complete Edition bonus tracks
No.	Title	Writer(s)	Producer(s)	Length
23.	"Red Eye" (featuring TroyBoi)	Bieber; Troy Henry; Dominic Jordan; Jimmy Giannos; Sasha Sirota; Boyd	TroyBoi; Sirota; Poo Bear	3:07
24.	"Angels Speak" (featuring Poo Bear)	Bieber; Boyd; Sirota; Phillip Ferrell II	Poo Bear; Ferrell	3:51
25.	"Hailey"	Bieber; Wotman; Bell; Bellion; Tamposi	Andrew Watt; Bell	3:13
Total length:				75:13

Notes

- ^[a] signifies a co-producer.
- ^[b] signifies an additional producer.
- "Angels Speak" was a part of the Target exclusive edition of the album before the complete version was officially released.
- "Red Eye" and "Hailey" were a part of the Walmart exclusive edition of the album before the complete version was officially released.
- The Japanese Complete Edition includes two "Peaches" bonus remix tracks: Masterkraft Remix (featuring Alpha P & Omah Lay), and Remix (featuring Ludacris, Usher & Snoop Dogg)
- The Japanese deluxe edition includes the bonus DVD which features an interview, and the music video & behind the scenes of "Anyone" & "Holy".

== Personnel ==
Adapted from Tidal.

=== Musicians ===
- Justin Bieber – lead vocals, songwriting (all except 7), backing vocals (2, 8)
- Khalid – featured artist (3), vocals (3), songwriting (3)
- Chance the Rapper – featured artist (5), vocals (5), songwriting (5)
- The Kid Laroi – featured artist (6), vocals (6), songwriting (6)
- Dominic Fike – featured artist (8), vocals (8), songwriting (8)
- Daniel Caesar – featured artist (12), vocals (12), songwriting (12)
- Giveon – featured artist (12), vocals (12), songwriting (12)
- Beam – featured artist (13), vocals (13), backing vocals (13), songwriting (13)
- Burna Boy – featured artist (14), vocals (14), songwriting (14)
- Benny Blanco – co-lead artist (16), songwriting (16), production (16), engineering (16), keyboards (16), programming (16)
- Skrillex – songwriting (1, 10, 14), production (1, 10, 14), drums (10), keyboards (10), programming (10)
- Andrew Watt – songwriting (2, 9, 12, 15), production (2, 8, 9, 15), backing vocals (2, 8, 9, 15), bass (2, 8, 9), guitar (2, 8, 9, 15), drums (2, 8, 15), keyboards (2, 15), adaptation (8)
- Louis Bell – songwriting (2, 8, 9, 12), production (2, 8, 9), backing vocals (2, 8, 9), drums (2, 8), keyboards (2), programming (2, 8, 9)
- Jon Bellion – songwriting (2, 5, 8, 9, 11, 14, 15), production (5, 11, 15), backing vocals (2, 5, 8, 9, 11, 14, 15), percussion (5), programming (11, 15), bass (15), drums (15), vocal production (11)
- Michael Pollack – songwriting (2, 5, 11, 15), backing vocals (5, 15), organ (5) piano (5, 11), keyboards (2, 15)
- German – production (3, 13), bass (3, 13), programming (3, 13), drums (13)
- Ido Zmishlany – songwriting (3), production (3), co-production (3), piano (3)
- Josh Gudwin – songwriting (1, 3, 6, 10), production (3, 13), mixing (1–6, 8–16), vocal production (1, 3, 4, 6, 10, 11, 13, 14, 16), recording (3), engineering (5, 11, 16), vocal engineering (12–14, 16)
- The Monsters & Strangerz – production (3, 11, 13, 15), drums (3, 11, 13), programming (3, 11, 13, 15), bass (11, 13), keyboards (11, 15)
  - Alexander Izquierdo – songwriting (1, 13, 15), backing vocals (15)
  - Jordan K. Johnson – songwriting (3, 11, 15), backing vocals (15)
  - Stefan Johnson – songwriting (3, 11, 15), vocal production (3, 11), backing vocals (15)
  - Marcus Lomax – songwriting (13), backing vocals (13), keyboards (13)
  - Oliver Peterhof – songwriting (3, 13)
- Dreamlab – production (4), recording (4)
  - Daniel James – songwriting (4), recording (4)
  - Leah Haywood – songwriting (4)
- Jake Torrey – songwriting (4), production (4), guitar (4)
- Jorgen Odegard – songwriting (5), production (5), backing vocals (5), organ (5) drums (5), engineering (5), programming (5), synthesizer (5)
- Steven Franks – songwriting (5), production (5)
- Tommy Brown – songwriting (5), production (5), bass (5)
- Aldae – production (6), assistant production (6)
- Jimmie Gutch – songwriting (6), production (6)
- Ilya – songwriting (10), production (10), backing vocals (10), co-production (10), keyboards (10), percussion (10), programming (10)
- Harv – songwriting (10, 12), production (10, 12), bass (12), guitar (12), keyboards (12), piano (12)
- Shndo – production (12), co-production (12)
- Jason Evigan – songwriting (14), production (14), backing vocals (14), bass (14), drums (14), guitar (14), keyboards (14), programming (14)
- LeriQ – production (14), additional production (14)
- Finneas – songwriting (16), production (16), engineering (16), keyboards (16), programming (16)
- Freddy Wexler – songwriting (1)
- Gian Stone – songwriting (1)
- Gregory Eric Hein – songwriting (1, 3, 6, 10), backing vocals (1, 3, 6, 10)
- Martin Luther King Jr. – songwriting (1, 7)
- Valentin Brunn – songwriting (1)
- Ali Tamposi – songwriting (2, 8, 9), backing vocals (2, 8, 9)
- Scott Harris – songwriting (3)
- Tia Scola – songwriting (4)
- Anthony M. Jones – songwriting (5)
- Brittany Amaradio – songwriting (6)
- Rami Yacoub – songwriting (6, 10)
- Luiz Bonfa – songwriting (9)
- Walter De Backer – songwriting (9)
- Ryan Tedder – songwriting (10), backing vocals (10)
- Luis Manuel Martinez Jr. – songwriting (12)
- Jordan Douglas – songwriting (13)
- Whitney Phillips – songwriting (13)
- Amy Allen – songwriting (14)
- Raul Cubina – songwriting (15), percussion (15)
- Candice Mills – backing vocals (5)
- Carla Williams – backing vocals (5)
- Christeyun Morgan – backing vocals (5)
- Darian Elliot – backing vocals (5)
- Demarcus Williams – backing vocals (5)
- Denae Daughtery – backing vocals (5)
- Drea Randle Matthews – backing vocals (5)
- Eboni Ellerson – backing vocals (5)
- Eric Birdine – backing vocals (5)
- James McKissic – backing vocals (5)
- Ja'Quoi Griffin – backing vocals (5)
- Mariann Shaw – backing vocals (5)
- Marshari Williams – backing vocals (5)
- Melodie Pace – backing vocals (5)
- Michael Bethany – backing vocals (5)
- Myron Williams – backing vocals (5)
- Tameka Sanford – backing vocals (5)
- Zahrea Clayton – backing vocals (5)
- Virtual Riot – piano (1)
- Pierre-Luc Rioux – guitar (3, 11)
- Max Grahn – drums (10)
- Charlie Puth – piano (15)

=== Technical ===
- Josh Gudwin – mixing (1–16)
- Colin Leonard – mastering (1–6, 8–16)
- Paul LaMalfa – engineering (2, 8, 9, 12, 15)
- Elijah Marrett-Hitch – assistant mixing (5, 16)
- Heidi Wang – assistant mixing (1–4, 6, 8–15), recording (3), engineering (11, 13), assistant record engineering (13)
- Chris O'Ryan – engineering (1, 4, 5, 14), vocal engineering (16), vocal production (16)
- Devin Nakao – engineering (5, 14, 16), recording (2, 4, 8, 9, 15)
- John Arbuckle – engineering (5)
- Cory Brice – engineering (10)
- Drew Gold – engineering (10)
- Jeremy Lertola – engineering (10)
- Sam Holland – engineering (10)
- Denis Kosiak – recording (3), vocal production (3)
- Michael Havens – recording (5)
- Kevin Carbo – recording (8)
- Lionel Crasta – recording (14)
- Rafael Fadul – recording (14)
- Ryan Lytle – assistant record engineering (1, 4, 6, 10–12, 14)
- James Keeley – assistant record engineering (3)
- Chenao Wang – assistant record engineering (8)
- Kirk Franklin – choir arranging (5)
- Scooter Braun – choir arranging (5), production coordination (16)
- Andrew Luftman – production coordination (16)
- Sarah Shelton – production coordination (16)

== Charts ==
=== Weekly charts ===
Weekly chart performance
Chart (2021)	Peak position
Argentine Albums (CAPIF)	5
Australian Albums (ARIA)	1
Austrian Albums (Ö3 Austria)	1
Belgian Albums (Ultratop Flanders)	1
Belgian Albums (Ultratop Wallonia)	5
Canadian Albums (Billboard)	1
Czech Albums (ČNS IFPI)	1
Danish Albums (Hitlisten)	1
Dutch Albums (Album Top 100)	1
Finnish Albums (Suomen virallinen lista)	1
French Albums (SNEP)	8
German Albums (Offizielle Top 100)	4
Hungarian Albums (MAHASZ)	28
Icelandic Albums (Tónlistinn)	1
Irish Albums (Official Charts)	1
Italian Albums (FIMI)	4
Japan Hot Albums (Billboard Japan)	17
Japanese Albums (Oricon)	22
Lithuanian Albums (AGATA)	1
New Zealand Albums (RMNZ)	1
Norwegian Albums (VG-lista)	1
Polish Albums (ZPAV)	6
Portuguese Albums (AFP)	2
Scottish Albums (Official Charts)	5
Slovak Albums (ČNS IFPI)	1
Spanish Albums (Promusicae)	2
Swedish Albums (Sverigetopplistan)	1
Swiss Albums (Schweizer Hitparade)	4
UK Albums (Official Charts)	2
US Billboard 200	1

Chart (2025)	Peak position
Nigerian Albums (TurnTable)	81

=== Year-end charts ===
2021 year-end chart performance
Chart (2021)	Position
Australian Albums (ARIA)	5
Austrian Albums (Ö3 Austria)	43
Belgian Albums (Ultratop Flanders)	17
Belgian Albums (Ultratop Wallonia)	97
Canadian Albums (Billboard)	6
Danish Albums (Hitlisten)	1
Dutch Albums (Album Top 100)	3
French Albums (SNEP)	68
Icelandic Albums (Tónlistinn)	16
Irish Albums (IRMA)	16
Italian Albums (FIMI)	47
New Zealand Albums (RMNZ)	8
Norwegian Albums (VG-lista)	2
Slovak Albums (ČNS IFPI)	8
Spanish Albums (PROMUSICAE)	31
Swedish Albums (Sverigetopplistan)	8
Swiss Albums (Schweizer Hitparade)	42
UK Albums (OCC)	21
US Billboard 200	15

2022 year-end chart performance
Chart (2022)	Position
Australian Albums (ARIA)	24
Belgian Albums (Ultratop Flanders)	76
Canadian Albums (Billboard)	11
Danish Albums (Hitlisten)	6
Dutch Albums (Album Top 100)	16
French Albums (SNEP)	162
Icelandic Albums (Tónlistinn)	85
Lithuanian Albums (AGATA)	74
New Zealand Albums (RMNZ)	15
Norwegian Albums (VG-lista)	7
Spanish Albums (PROMUSICAE)	71
Swedish Albums (Sverigetopplistan)	58
UK Albums (OCC)	92
US Billboard 200	39

2023 year-end chart performance
Chart (2023)	Position
Australian Albums (ARIA)	93
Belgian Albums (Ultratop Flanders)	167
Danish Albums (Hitlisten)	59
Dutch Albums (Album Top 100)	95
Norwegian Albums (VG-lista)	39
US Billboard 200	185

2024 year-end chart performance
Chart (2024)	Position
Portuguese Albums (AFP)	179

== Certifications ==
Certifications
Region	Certification	Certified units/sales
Australia (ARIA)	2× Platinum	140,000^{‡}
Austria (IFPI Austria)	Gold	7,500^{‡}
Belgium (BRMA)	3× Platinum	60,000^{‡}
Canada (Music Canada)	3× Platinum	240,000^{‡}
Denmark (IFPI Danmark)	5× Platinum	100,000^{‡}
France (SNEP)	Platinum	100,000^{‡}
Italy (FIMI)	Platinum	50,000^{‡}
Mexico (AMPROFON)	Platinum+Gold	210,000^{‡}
New Zealand (RMNZ)	4× Platinum	60,000^{‡}
Norway (IFPI Norway)	2× Platinum	40,000^{‡}
Poland (ZPAV)	2× Platinum	40,000^{‡}
Portugal (AFP)	Gold	3,500^{‡}
Singapore (RIAS)	Platinum	10,000^{*}
Spain (Promusicae)	Gold	20,000^{‡}
Sweden (GLF)	Gold	15,000^{‡}
United Kingdom (BPI)	Platinum	300,000^{‡}
United States (RIAA)	2× Platinum	2,000,000^{‡}
^{*} Sales figures based on certification alone.^{‡} Sales+streaming figures based on certification alone.

== Release history ==
Release history
Region	Date	Format	Version	Label	Ref.
Various	March 19, 2021	CD; digital download; streaming	Standard	Def Jam	
United States	March 19, 2021	CD; cassette	Target exclusive	Def Jam	
United States	March 19, 2021	CD; cassette	Walmart exclusive	Def Jam	
Japan	March 19, 2021	CD; cassette	Japanese edition	Universal Music Japan	
Japan	March 19, 2021	CD; DVD	Deluxe edition	Universal Music Japan	
Various	March 26, 2021	Digital download; streaming; CD; Vinyl	Triple Chucks Deluxe	Def Jam	
Various	June 25, 2021	Vinyl	Standard	Def Jam	
Brazil	April 30, 2021	CD	Standard; bonus tracks	Universal Music Brasil	
Various	October 8, 2021	Digital download; streaming	The complete edition	Def Jam	
Japan	November 26, 2021	CD	The complete edition	Universal Music Japan	
