= Boza (singer) =

Humberto Ceballos Boza
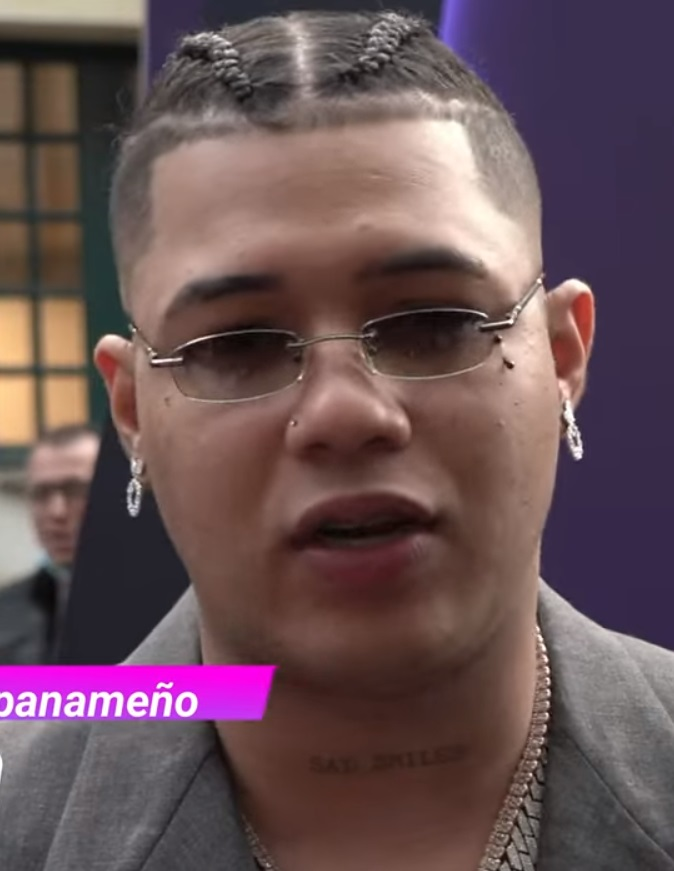
- Boza at 2022 Premios Nuestra Tierra

Background information
- Also known as: El Boza
- Born: Humberto Ceballos Boza; July 25, 1997 (age 28); Panama City, Panama
- Genres: Reggaeton
- Occupations: Rapper; songwriter
- Instrument: Vocals
- Years active: 2014–present
- Labels: Rollin Bower Group; Panama Music; Sony Music Latin

Humberto Ceballos Boza (born Panama City, July 25, 1997), better known by his stage name Boza, is a Panamanian singer and songwriter. He began his career in 2014 by venturing into urban music. His style is characterized by the fusion between the dancehall and reggaeton with the Panamanian style "canela".

== Biography ==
"Singing was not something that was in my future plans; I wanted to be a footballer, but because of limited resources I couldn't. Music came about because it passed from one friend to another. They listened to me on street corners and it was at my first performance, which was pretty straightforward, that Faster [DJ and music producer] was told about me. He introduced me to music from day zero and until today we are what we are, thanks to him"

—El Boza in an interview with La Teja.

El Boza has commented that since childhood he had an interest in football, and wanted to perform as a professional footballer. However, for various reasons he decided to go into music. In his childhood he used to sing to his friends on top of an old refrigerator, and they were amazed by his musical qualities and decided to tell a music producer about him. He rose to fame in Panama in 2015 with the song "Bandolera" along with the also Panamanian singers Yemil and El Tachi.

== Career ==
Boza started his music career in 2014, when he was just 16 years old. His first song was "Canelas", but his popularity was ignited with "Bandolera", a collaboration with Panamanian singers Yemil and Tachi. He was one of the fresh faces of the new wave of Panamanians that with dancehall, reggae in Spanish, trap and explicit content flowed in a musical category that they called "canela". They were immediately criticized by artists from the past and tried to censor them, as is often the case with sounds created by a young generation. The Chombo legendary figure of Latin music is one of the main detractors of "canela".

In April 2017, he joined the record label Panama Music, led by Januario Crespo, who signed the rights to represent the idol. In the following years, he released songs such as "Ratas y ratones", "Lollipop" and "Me mató", which allowed him to obtain international recognition. This musical credit goes to Panamanian record producer Irving Quintero "Faster", who asserts that the artist will continue to maintain his essence, confirming the talent and versatility he possesses when it comes to interpretation. In April 2019, he signed with Sony Music Latin, thus becoming the first Panamanian artist to sign with the record company.

In June 2019, he announced that his debut album was in development. In September of the same year, he released the first single from the album entitled "En 4 Vente". In February 2020, Boza released his debut extended play, Sonrisas Tristes, which includes the single "Party en mi Casa", which peaked at number three in Panama. Later, on July 31, 2020, Boza released his debut studio album, Más Negro que Rojo, which includes the songs "Bandida", which became Boza's highest-charting single in Panama, debuting at number two; and "Hecha Pa' Mi", that became a commercial success in Latin America, Europe and the United States, after earning popularity on the video-sharing app TikTok.

On September 28, 2021, Boza was announced as a nominee for Best New Artist at the 22nd Annual Latin Grammy Awards.

On September 25, 2025, Boza released the single "París" with fellow Panamanian singer Sech, stating "All of Panama wanted us to [collaborate], and now it's finally come to life."

== Discography ==
=== Albums ===
List of albums
Title	Album details
Más Negro que Rojo	Release: July 31, 2020; Label: Sony Music Latin; Formats: LP, digital download, streaming
Bucle	Release: March 11, 2022; Label: Sony Music Latin; Formats: Digital download, streaming
Sin Sol	Release: June 15, 2023; Label: Sony Music Latin; Formats: Digital download, streaming
San Blas	Release: April 23, 2025; Label: Sony Music Latin; Formats: Digital download, streaming

=== Extended plays ===
List of extended plays
Title	Album details
Sonrisas Tristes	Release: February 14, 2020; Label: Sony Music Latin; Formats: Digital download, streaming
Ella	Release: April 16, 2021; Label: Sony Music Latin; Formats: Digital download, streaming
En La Luna	Release: June 25, 2021; Label: Sony Music Latin; Formats: Digital download, streaming
Qué Prefieres?	Release: September 22, 2022; Label: Sony Music Latin; Formats: Digital download, streaming
Booty Puty	Release: December 9, 2022; Label: Sony Music Latin; Formats: Digital download, streaming
Barco de Papel	Release: November 9, 2023; Label: Sony Music Latin; Formats: Digital download, streaming
Par De Quina	Release: February 1, 2024; Label: Sony Music Latin; Formats: Digital download, streaming
Orión	Release: May 30, 2024; Label: Sony Music Latin; Formats: Digital download, streaming
Todavía	Release: February 12, 2025; Label: Digital download, streaming; Formats: Digital download, streaming

=== Singles ===
==== As a lead artist ====
Title	Year	Peak chart positions										Certifications	Album
Title	Year	PAN	ARG	COL	CR	ITA	POR	SPA	SWI	US Latin	VEN	Certifications	Album
"Canelas"	2014	–	–	–	–	–	–	–	–	–	–		Non-album singles
"Ahora Me Llamas" (featuring Mystical)	2015	–	–	–	–	–	–	–	–	–	–		Non-album singles
"Vil Diva"	2015	–	–	–	–	–	–	–	–	–	–		Non-album singles
"Prohibida"	2015	–	–	–	–	–	–	–	–	–	–		Non-album singles
"El Muñeco"	2015	–	–	–	–	–	–	–	–	–	–		Non-album singles
"Era Mentira" (featuring Miguel Ángel)	2015	–	–	–	–	–	–	–	–	–	–		Non-album singles
"Desahogo"	2015	–	–	–	–	–	–	–	–	–	–		Non-album singles
"Para Que"	2016	–	–	–	–	–	–	–	–	–	–		Non-album singles
"Long Time"	2016	–	–	–	–	–	–	–	–	–	–		Non-album singles
"Me Extrañas"	2016	–	–	–	–	–	–	–	–	–	–		Non-album singles
"Check One Way"	2016	–	–	–	–	–	–	–	–	–	–		Non-album singles
"Perro de la Vida" (featuring Yemil)	2016	–	–	–	–	–	–	–	–	–	–		Non-album singles
"Al Igual que Tú"	2016	–	–	–	–	–	–	–	–	–	–		Non-album singles
"Shobull Choque"	2016	–	–	–	–	–	–	–	–	–	–		Non-album singles
"Reina Sin King"	2016	–	–	–	–	–	–	–	–	–	–		Non-album singles
"Noche de Gala"	2017	–	–	–	–	–	–	–	–	–	–		Non-album singles
"Lighta"	2017	–	–	–	–	–	–	–	–	–	–		Non-album singles
"Real Pomposa"	2017	–	–	–	–	–	–	–	–	–	–		Non-album singles
"Bomba de Tiempo"	2018	–	–	–	–	–	–	–	–	–	–		Non-album singles
"Hoy"	2018	–	–	–	–	–	–	–	–	–	–		Non-album singles
"Ratas y Ratones"	2018	–	–	–	–	–	–	–	–	–	–		Non-album singles
"Bamboleo"	2018	–	–	–	–	–	–	–	–	–	–		Non-album singles
"Qué Será de Mi Ex"	2018	–	–	–	–	–	–	–	–	–	–		Non-album singles
"Ya no hay más amor"	2018	–	–	–	–	–	–	–	–	–	–		Non-album singles
"Vine por ti" (featuring Carlienis)	2018	–	–	–	–	–	–	–	–	–	–		Non-album singles
"Vamo' a prender" (featuring El Tachi)	2018	–	–	–	–	–	–	–	–	–	–		Non-album singles
"Lollipop"	2018	8	–	–	–	–	–	–	–	–	–		Non-album singles
"Un nuevo amanecer"	2018	–	–	–	–	–	–	–	–	–	–		Non-album singles
"Me Mató"	2019	–	–	–	–	–	–	–	–	–	–		Non-album singles
"En 4 Vente"	2019	–	–	–	–	–	–	–	–	–	–		Non-album singles
"Party En Mi Casa"	2020	3	–	–	–	–	–	–	–	–	–		Más Negro que Rojo
"Odiarte"	2020	–	–	–	–	–	–	–	–	–	–		Más Negro que Rojo
"Bandida"	2020	2	–	–	–	–	–	–	–	–	–		Más Negro que Rojo
"Hecha Pa' Mi"	2020	4	16	3	6	9	20	5	56	36	1	ASINCOL: Gold; FIMI: 2× Platinum; PROMUSICAE: 2× Platinum; RIAA: 4× Platinum (Latin)	Más Negro que Rojo
"Ella"	2021	3	–	–	6	–	–	23	–	–	1	PROMUSICAE: Gold; RIAA: Platinum (Latin)	Bucle
"Perreito Salvaje" (with Emilia)	2021												Non-album single
"En la Luna"	2021	6	–	–	–	–	–	–	–	–	–		Bucle
"Por Ella" (with Cali Y El Dandee)	2021												Malibu
"Puñales" (with Llane)	2021												Fino
"Ella (Remix)" (with Lunay, Lenny Tavárez, Juhn and Beéle)	2021	–	50	–	–	–	–	51	–	–	–	RIAA: Platinum (Latin)	Bucle
"Qué Prefieres?" (with Beéle)	2022												Sin Sol
"Volar" (with Dalex)	2023												Sin Sol
"Ocean" (with Kenia Os)	2023												Sin Sol
"Barco de Papel"	2023	1	–	–	–	–	–	–	–	–	–		San Blas
"Infeliz"	2024												Non-album single
"Orión" (with Elena Rose)	2024												San Blas
"Parley"	2025												Non-album single
"Todavía" (with Greeicy)	2025												San Blas
"Voltaje" (with Mau y Ricky)	2025												TBA
"París" (with Sech)	2025	1	–	–	–	–	–	–	–	–	–		Non-album single
"—" denotes items which were not released in that country or failed to chart.

==== As a featured artist ====
Title	Year	Peak chart positions	Album
Title	Year	PAN	Album
"Bandolera" (Yemil featuring Tachi and Boza)	2015	–	Non-album singles
"Señora Chanel" (Baby Wally featuring Boza)	2015	–	Non-album singles
"Monótono" (Dubosky featuring Sech, Mr. Fox, Yemil, Jay Fire and Boza)	2016	–	Non-album singles
"Me Enamoró (Remix)" (Los Rakas featuring Tobe Love and Boza)	2016	–	Non-album singles
"Pareja Explosiva" (Mista Bombo featuring BCA and Boza)	2018	–	Non-album singles
"Deja La Envidia" (Chamaco featuring Boza)	2019	–	Non-album singles
"Maldad" (BCA featuring Boza)	2020	12	Non-album singles
"Bebe" (Joey Montana featuring Boza)	2021	8	Non-album singles
"Otra Baby" (Akim, Dalex and Beéle featuring Boza)	2021	–	Non-album singles

== Awards and nominations ==
Award	Year	Recipient(s) and nominee(s)	Category	Result	Ref.
Latin Grammy Awards	2021	Himself	Best New Artist	Nominated	
Latin Grammy Awards	2025	"Orión" (Sistek Remix) (with Elena Rose and Sistek)	Best Latin Electronic Music Performance	Pending	
MTV MIAW Awards	2021	Hecha Pa' Mi	Viral Anthem	Nominated	
Premios Juventud	2022	Himself	The New Generation – Male	Nominated	
Premios Juventud	2023	Himself	Male Artist – On The Rise	Nominated	
Premios Juventud	2025	San Blas	Best Urban Album	Nominated	
Premios Juventud	2025	"Orión" (with Elena Rose)	Best Pop/Urban Song	Nominated	
Premios Lo Nuestro	2022	Himself	New Male Artist	Nominated	
Premios Lo Nuestro	2024	"Sé Que Estás Con Él" (Silvestre Dangond and Reik featuring Boza)	Song of the Year	Nominated	
Premios Lo Nuestro	2024	"Sé Que Estás Con Él" (Silvestre Dangond and Reik featuring Boza)	Urban/Pop Collaboration of the Year	Nominated	
Premios Tu Música Urbano	2022	"Ella" (remix)	Remix of the Year	Nominated	
Premios Tu Música Urbano	2022	Bucle	Album of the Year – New Artist	Nominated	
