= Anyone (Justin Bieber song) =

2021 single by Justin Bieber

Single by Justin Bieber

from the album Justice
- Released: January 1, 2021
- Genre: Synth-pop
- Length: 3:10
- Label: Def Jam
- Songwriters: Justin Bieber; Andrew Wotman; Jonathan Bellion; Alexander Izquierdo; Jordan K. Johnson; Stefan Johnson; Michael Pollack; Raul Cubina; David Paich (Note: Acknowledged after allegations of plagiarizing the song Goin' Home by Toto.); Susan Porcaro Goings; Joseph Williams
- Producers: Jon Bellion; Andrew Watt; The Monsters & Strangerz

Justin Bieber singles chronology
| "Monster" (2020) | "Anyone" (2021) | "Hold On" (2021) |

Music video
- "Anyone" on YouTube

"Anyone" is a song by the Canadian singer Justin Bieber. It was released through Def Jam Recordings as the third single from his sixth studio album, Justice, on January 1, 2021. Bieber wrote the song with producers Jon Bellion, Andrew Watt, and the Monsters & Strangerz production trio (Alexander Izquierdo, Jordan K. Johnson, and Stefan Johnson), alongside Michael Pollack and Raul Cubina. At the 64th Annual Grammy Awards, "Anyone" received a nomination for Best Pop Solo Performance.

== Background ==
Bieber revealed on April 10, 2020, during an Instagram Live that he had recorded a song called "Anyone". On December 30, 2020, Bieber announced on Twitter that the song would be released on January 1, 2021. He revealed the cover art and a 15-second trailer of the song's accompanying music video the following day. On December 31, 2020, Bieber performed his first full concert since 2017, which included the debut performance of "Anyone". Speaking of the song, Bieber said: "'Anyone' is such a special, hopeful, anthemic song. It sets the tone for a brighter new year full of hope and possibility".

In February 2021, a demo of "Anyone" by Camila Cabello leaked. The demo suggests that the song was once intended as a bonus track for Cabello's 2019 album Romance.

== Composition ==
"Anyone" is a 1980s and 1990s-inspired synth-pop power ballad with a rhythmic pulse and blue-eyed soul influences. The song is three minutes and 10 seconds in length.

== Chart performance ==
"Anyone" debuted at its peak of number two on the Canadian Hot 100 issued for January 16, 2021. Music Canada certified the song Double Platinum. On the US Billboard Hot 100, it debuted and peaked at number six; it earned a Double Platinum certification from the Recording Industry Association of America (RIAA), which denotes 2,000,000 units based on sales and track-equivalent on-demand streams. "Anyone" entered at number four on the UK Singles Chart, and the British Phonographic Industry (BPI) certified it Platinum. In Australia, the song debuted at number five and went Platinum. It peaked at number nine in New Zealand and received a Double Platinum certification. "Anyone" charted within the top 10 of national record charts, at number two in Norway, number three in Denmark, number four in Hungary, Singapore, number five in Ireland, number six in Sweden, number seven in the Netherlands, number eight in Malaysia, and number nine in Finland. It received a Platinum certification in Denmark.

== Music video ==
The music video premiered on YouTube on January 1, 2021, at 05:00 UTC (midnight Eastern Standard Time). It was directed by American music video director and film maker Colin Tilley and stars American actress Zoey Deutch who plays Bieber's love interest in the video. Bieber portrays a 1940s boxer whose powerful love for his other half inspires him to train, fight, and eventually overcome a potential K.O. on his journey to becoming a champion. For the music video, Bieber covered up all of his tattoos.

=== Credits and personnel ===
Credits adapted from YouTube.

- Colin Tilley – direction
- James Ranta – production
- Whitney Jackson – production
- Elias Talbot – photography direction
- Vinnie Hobbs – editing
- SB Projects – management

== Live performances ==
Bieber performed the song for the first time during his New Year's Eve concert on December 31, 2020. He later performed the song on March 13, 2021, during the 2021 Kids' Choice Awards. In May 2, he performed the song on Big Brother Brasil 21.

== Plagiarism allegation ==
In February 2021, American music professional Rick Beato compared "Anyone" to "Goin' Home" (1998), a song by American rock band Toto. He expressed his opinion that the choruses of the songs are written in the same key, and the melody and tempo are almost the same. Canadian radio station CKDR-FM expressed a similar opinion. American guitarist and Toto's founding member Steve Lukather accused Bieber of stealing "Goin' Home" in a May 2021 interview. Meanwhile, the American Society of Composers, Authors and Publishers (ASCAP) lists Toto members David Paich and Joseph Williams as co-writers of the song as well as Susan Porcaro-Goings, the widow of Toto's late drummer Jeff Porcaro.

== Credits and personnel ==
Credits adapted from Tidal.

- Justin Bieber – lead vocals, songwriting, background vocals
- Andrew Watt – production, songwriting, background vocals, drums, guitar, keyboards
- Jon Bellion – production, songwriting, background vocals, bass, drums, programming
- The Monsters & Strangerz – production, keyboards, programming
  - Alexander Izquierdo – songwriting, background vocals
  - Jordan K. Johnson – songwriting, background vocals
  - Stefan Johnson – songwriting, background vocals
- Michael Pollack – songwriting, background vocals, keyboards
- Raul Cubina – songwriting, background vocals, percussion
- Heidi Wang – mixing assistance
- Colin Leonard – mastering
- Josh Gudwin – mixing
- Charlie Puth – piano
- Devin Nakao – record engineering
- Paul LaMalfa – record engineering

== Charts ==
=== Weekly charts ===
Weekly chart performance for "Anyone"
| Chart (2021) | Peak position |
|---|---|
| Australia (ARIA) | 5 |
| Austria (Ö3 Austria Top 40) | 11 |
| Belgium (Ultratop 50 Flanders) | 15 |
| Belgium (Ultratop 50 Wallonia) | 33 |
| Canada Hot 100 (Billboard) | 2 |
| Canada AC (Billboard) | 2 |
| Canada CHR/Top 40 (Billboard) | 3 |
| Canada Hot AC (Billboard) | 7 |
| Croatia (HRT) | 5 |
| Czech Republic Singles Digital (ČNS IFPI) | 19 |
| Denmark (Tracklisten) | 3 |
| Finland (Suomen virallinen lista) | 9 |
| France (SNEP) | 148 |
| Germany (GfK) | 30 |
| Global 200 (Billboard) | 3 |
| Greece (IFPI) | 25 |
| Hungary (Single Top 40) | 4 |
| Hungary (Stream Top 40) | 25 |
| Iceland (Tónlistinn) | 9 |
| Ireland (IRMA) | 5 |
| Italy (FIMI) | 32 |
| Japan Hot 100 (Billboard) | 75 |
| Lithuania (AGATA) | 25 |
| Malaysia (RIM) | 8 |
| Mexico (Billboard Mexican Airplay) | 19 |
| Netherlands (Dutch Top 40) | 7 |
| Netherlands (Single Top 100) | 5 |
| New Zealand (Recorded Music NZ) | 9 |
| Norway (VG-lista) | 2 |
| Portugal (AFP) | 32 |
| Portugal Airplay (AFP) | 32 |
| San Marino (SMRRTV Top 50) | 41 |
| Singapore (RIAS) | 4 |
| Slovakia Airplay (ČNS IFPI) | 82 |
| Slovakia (Singles Digitál Top 100) | 9 |
| South Africa (RISA) | 5 |
| South Korea (Gaon) | 184 |
| Spain (Promusicae) | 68 |
| Sweden (Sverigetopplistan) | 6 |
| Switzerland (Schweizer Hitparade) | 12 |
| UK Singles (Official Charts) | 4 |
| US Billboard Hot 100 | 6 |
| US Adult Contemporary (Billboard) | 13 |
| US Adult Pop Airplay (Billboard) | 13 |
| US Pop Airplay (Billboard) | 12 |
| US Rhythmic Airplay (Billboard) | 29 |
| US Rolling Stone Top 100 | 1 |

=== Year-end charts ===
Year-end chart performance for "Anyone"
| Chart (2021) | Position |
|---|---|
| Australia (ARIA) | 30 |
| Belgium (Ultratop Flanders) | 70 |
| Canada (Canadian Hot 100) | 26 |
| Croatia (HRT) | 67 |
| Denmark (Tracklisten) | 26 |
| Global 200 (Billboard) | 97 |
| Iceland (Tónlistinn) | 44 |
| Netherlands (Dutch Top 40) | 38 |
| Netherlands (Single Top 100) | 67 |
| New Zealand (Recorded Music NZ) | 36 |
| Portugal (AFP) | 185 |
| Sweden (Sverigetopplistan) | 54 |
| UK Singles (OCC) | 67 |
| US Billboard Hot 100 | 74 |
| US Adult Contemporary (Billboard) | 30 |
| US Adult Top 40 (Billboard) | 41 |
| US Mainstream Top 40 (Billboard) | 43 |

== Certifications ==
Certifications for "Anyone"
| Region | Certification | Certified units/sales |
|---|---|---|
| Australia (ARIA) | 3× Platinum | 210,000^{‡} |
| Brazil (Pro-Música Brasil) | 3× Platinum | 120,000^{‡} |
| Canada (Music Canada) | 2× Platinum | 160,000^{‡} |
| Denmark (IFPI Danmark) | Platinum | 90,000^{‡} |
| Italy (FIMI) | Gold | 35,000^{‡} |
| Mexico (AMPROFON) | Gold | 70,000^{‡} |
| New Zealand (RMNZ) | 2× Platinum | 60,000^{‡} |
| Norway (IFPI Norway) | Platinum | 60,000^{‡} |
| Poland (ZPAV) | Gold | 25,000^{‡} |
| Portugal (AFP) | Gold | 5,000^{‡} |
| Spain (Promusicae) | Gold | 30,000^{‡} |
| United Kingdom (BPI) | Platinum | 600,000^{‡} |
| United States (RIAA) | 2× Platinum | 2,000,000^{‡} |
Streaming
| Sweden (GLF) | Platinum | 8,000,000^{†} |
^{‡} Sales+streaming figures based on certification alone.^{†} Streaming-only figures based on certification alone.

== Release history ==
Release dates and formats for "Anyone"
| Region | Date | Format(s) | Label | Ref. |
|---|---|---|---|---|
| Various | January 1, 2021 | CD single; digital download; streaming | Def Jam | |
| Italy | January 4, 2021 | Radio airplay | Universal | |
