= Holy (Justin Bieber song) =

2020 single by Justin Bieber featuring Chance the Rapper

Single by Justin Bieber featuring Chance the Rapper

from the album Justice
- Released: September 18, 2020
- Genre: Pop
- Length: 3:32
- Label: Def Jam
- Composers: Jonathan Bellion; Justin Bieber; Chancelor Bennett; Tommy Brown; Jorgen Odegard; Steven Franks; Michael Pollack; Anthony M. Jones
- Lyricists: Jon Bellion; Chancelor Bennett; Justin Bieber
- Producers: Bellion; Brown; Odegard; Franks; Pollack

Justin Bieber singles chronology
"Stuck with U" (2020)	"Holy" (2020)	"Lonely" (2020)

Chance the Rapper singles chronology
"Found You" (2020)	"Holy" (2020)	"BET Uncut" (2020)

Music video
- "Holy" on YouTube

"Holy" is a song by Canadian singer Justin Bieber featuring American rapper Chance the Rapper. It was released on September 18, 2020 as the lead single from the former's sixth studio album Justice (2021). "Holy" is a pop song with elements of gospel. Billboard named it the 41st best song of 2020. The acoustic version was released on November 6, 2020. The official music video for the song was released on September 18, 2020, and features Bieber as a laid-off oil worker and his partner being helped by a charitable soldier.

== Background ==
Bieber's fifth studio album Changes was released on February 14, 2020. On September 15, 2020, Bieber tweeted that his new single "Holy" would be released in a few days to signify his next musical "era". It has been speculated that the song is about Bieber's love for his wife Hailey Bieber and his love of God. "Holy" discusses themes of loyalty and faith, with The New York Times calling it "devotional R&B".

Bieber and Chance had previously worked on several songs together, with "Holy" marking their fifth collaboration. In terms of the lyrical content, both Bieber and Chance are Christians as well as songwriter Jon Bellion.

Jon Bellion earlier performed it at a VIP concert event saying that it will be released later in the year. Bellion's fans would begin to beg for it and eventually get it released by Bieber and Chance The Rapper, whom Jon would work with knowing they would reach a broader audience and more ears overall.

== Composition ==
"Holy" is a pop song with gospel elements. The song composed in G-flat major, vocal range spans from D♭_{4} to G♭_{5} with a tempo of 88 beats per minute.

== Release and promotion ==
Bieber performed a live version of the song on Saturday Night Live on October 17, 2020. He performed the song again at the 2020 People's Choice Awards in November.

The acoustic version of the song was released on November 6.

A charity version of the song was released on December 18. This version featured the Lewisham and Greenwich NHS Choir, who had got to the top of the UK Christmas singles chart in 2015 with their charity release "A Bridge over You", a chart which saw Bieber at number two with "Love Yourself". "Holy" was an early contender for the 2020 UK Christmas number one in the UK. However, when the new version was released on 18 December 2020, it still had a credit for Chance the Rapper, like the original version which first entered the UK chart on 25 September 2020. As the new record was seen as just a remix, "Holy" ended up at Number 41 in the Christmas chart with 17,594 sales, after being classed as per the original release with a lower chart ratio.

== Critical reception ==
NME rated the song 3/5 stars, and drew similarities to Kanye West's gospel music. Stereogum criticized the song's bland lyrics and execution, writing, "Being madly in love with your spouse is good; it’s just that the Justin Bieber songs about being madly in love with your spouse are bad."

=== Year-end lists ===
Publication	List	Rank	Ref.
Billboard	The 100 Best Songs of 2020	41	
Glamour	The 63 Best Songs of 2020	Placed	

== Commercial performance ==
"Holy" debuted and peaked at number one on the Canadian Hot 100 issued for October 3, 2020. It was certified 2× Platinum by Music Canada. On the US Billboard Hot 100, it debuted and peaked at number three. It earned a 3× Platinum certification from the Recording Industry Association of America (RIAA), which denotes three million units based on sales and track-equivalent on-demand streams. "Holy" reached number seven on the UK Singles Chart, and the British Phonographic Industry (BPI) certified it Gold. In Australia, the song charted at number four and went 4× Platinum. It peaked at number two in New Zealand and received a 3× Platinum certification. "Holy" reached the top 10 of national record charts, at number two in Ireland, number three in the Netherlands, Norway, number five in Singapore, Sweden, number six in the Czech Republic, Malaysia, number seven in Denmark, number eight in Poland, number nine in Scotland, and number 10 in Austria, Hungary, Switzerland. The song received a Gold certification in Belgium, Norway.

== Music video ==
The music video for "Holy" was released the same day as the song, September 18, 2020. It was directed by Colin Tilley and stars Wilmer Valderrama and Ryan Destiny. The video follows Bieber, a recently laid off oil worker, and Destiny as a couple who meet a helpful soldier played by Valderrama. The video has been interpreted as a commentary on the Just Transition. As of February 19, 2026, the official music video has surpassed over 252 million views.

== Credits and personnel ==
Credits adapted from Jaxsta.

- Justin Bieber – lead vocals, songwriting
- Chance the Rapper – featured artist, lead vocals, songwriting
- Jon Bellion – production, songwriting, background vocals, percussion
- Jorgen Odegard – production, songwriting, background vocals, drums, engineering, organ, programming, synthesizer
- Michael Pollack – production, songwriting, piano, organ, background vocals
- Steven Franks – production, songwriting
- Tommy Lee Brown – production, songwriting, bass
- Anthony M. Jones – songwriting
- Elijah Marrett-Hitch – assistant mixing
- Darian Elliott – background vocals
- Melodie Pace – background vocals
- Michael Bethany – background vocals
- Kirk Franklin – choir arranging
- Scooter Braun – choir arranging
- Chris O'Ryan – engineering
- Devin Nakao – engineering
- John Arbuckle – engineering
- Josh Gudwin – engineering, mix engineering
- Colin Leonard – mastering engineering
- Michael Havens – recording engineering
- Candice Mills – vocals
- Carla Williams – vocals
- Christeyun Morgan – vocals
- Demarcus Williams – vocals
- Denae Daugherty – vocals
- Drea Randle Matthews – vocals
- Eboni Ellerson – vocals
- Eric Birdine – vocals
- James McKissic – vocals
- Ja'Quoi Griffin – vocals
- Mariann Shaw – vocals
- Marshari Williams – vocals
- Myron Williams – vocals
- Tameka Sanford – vocals
- Zahrea Clayton – vocals

== Charts ==
=== Weekly charts ===
Chart (2020–2021)	Peak position
Argentina Hot 100 (Billboard)	68
Australia (ARIA)	4
Austria (Ö3 Austria Top 40)	10
Belgium (Ultratop 50 Flanders)	19
Belgium (Ultratop 50 Wallonia)	18
Canada Hot 100 (Billboard)	1
Canada AC (Billboard)	1
Canada CHR/Top 40 (Billboard)	2
Canada Hot AC (Billboard)	1
Colombia Anglo (Monitor Latino)	10
Croatia (HRT)	9
Czech Republic Airplay (ČNS IFPI)	6
Czech Republic Singles Digital (ČNS IFPI)	20
Denmark (Tracklisten)	7
France (SNEP)	125
Germany (GfK)	22
Global 200 (Billboard)	3
Greece (IFPI)	25
Hungary (Rádiós Top 40)	29
Hungary (Single Top 40)	10
Hungary (Stream Top 40)	14
Iceland (Tónlistinn)	3
Ireland (IRMA)	2
Italy (FIMI)	61
Japan Hot 100 (Billboard)	46
Lebanon (OLT20)	11
Lithuania (AGATA)	23
Malaysia (RIM)	6
Mexico (Billboard Mexican Airplay)	7
Netherlands (Dutch Top 40)	3
Netherlands (Single Top 100)	5
New Zealand (Recorded Music NZ)	2
Norway (VG-lista)	3
Poland Airplay (ZPAV)	8
Portugal (AFP)	27
Romania (Airplay 100)	96
Scotland Singles (OCC)	9
Singapore (RIAS)	5
Slovakia Singles Digital (ČNS IFPI)	12
South Korea (Gaon)	101
Spain (Promusicae)	62
Sweden (Sverigetopplistan)	5
Switzerland (Schweizer Hitparade)	10
UK Singles (OCC)	7
US Billboard Hot 100	3
US Adult Contemporary (Billboard)	8
US Adult Pop Airplay (Billboard)	1
US Dance/Mix Show Airplay (Billboard)	28
US Pop Airplay (Billboard)	3
US Rhythmic Airplay (Billboard)	7

=== Year-end charts ===
Chart (2020)	Position
Australia (ARIA)	81
Canada (Canadian Hot 100)	91
Denmark (Tracklisten)	112
Hungary (Stream Top 40)	91
Iceland (Tónlistinn)	59
Netherlands (Dutch Top 40)	29
Netherlands (Single Top 100)	63

Chart (2021)	Position
Australia (ARIA)	58
Canada (Canadian Hot 100)	18
Denmark (Tracklisten)	48
Global 200 (Billboard)	85
New Zealand (Recorded Music NZ)	46
US Billboard Hot 100	35
US Adult Contemporary (Billboard)	17
US Adult Top 40 (Billboard)	14
US Mainstream Top 40 (Billboard)	19
US Rhythmic (Billboard)	45

== Certifications ==
Region	Certification	Certified units/sales
Australia (ARIA)	4× Platinum	280,000^{‡}
Belgium (BRMA)	Gold	20,000^{‡}
Brazil (Pro-Música Brasil)	Diamond	160,000^{‡}
Canada (Music Canada)	4× Platinum	320,000^{‡}
Denmark (IFPI Danmark)	2× Platinum	180,000^{‡}
France (SNEP)	Gold	100,000^{‡}
Italy (FIMI)	Gold	35,000^{‡}
New Zealand (RMNZ)	3× Platinum	90,000^{‡}
Norway (IFPI Norway)	Platinum	60,000^{‡}
Poland (ZPAV)	Platinum	50,000^{‡}
Portugal (AFP)	Platinum	10,000^{‡}
Spain (Promusicae)	Gold	30,000^{‡}
United Kingdom (BPI)	Platinum	600,000^{‡}
United States (RIAA)	3× Platinum	3,000,000^{‡}
Streaming
Japan (RIAJ)	Gold	50,000,000^{†}
Sweden (GLF)	Platinum	8,000,000^{†}
^{‡} Sales+streaming figures based on certification alone.^{†} Streaming-only figures based on certification alone.

== Release history ==
Country	Date	Format	Label	Ref.
Various	September 18, 2020	CD single; digital download; streaming	Def Jam	
Italy	September 18, 2020	Radio airplay	Universal	
United States	September 21, 2020	Adult contemporary radio	Def Jam	
Brazil	December 18, 2020	CD single	Universal	
