= Michael Pollack (songwriter) =

American songwriter and record producer

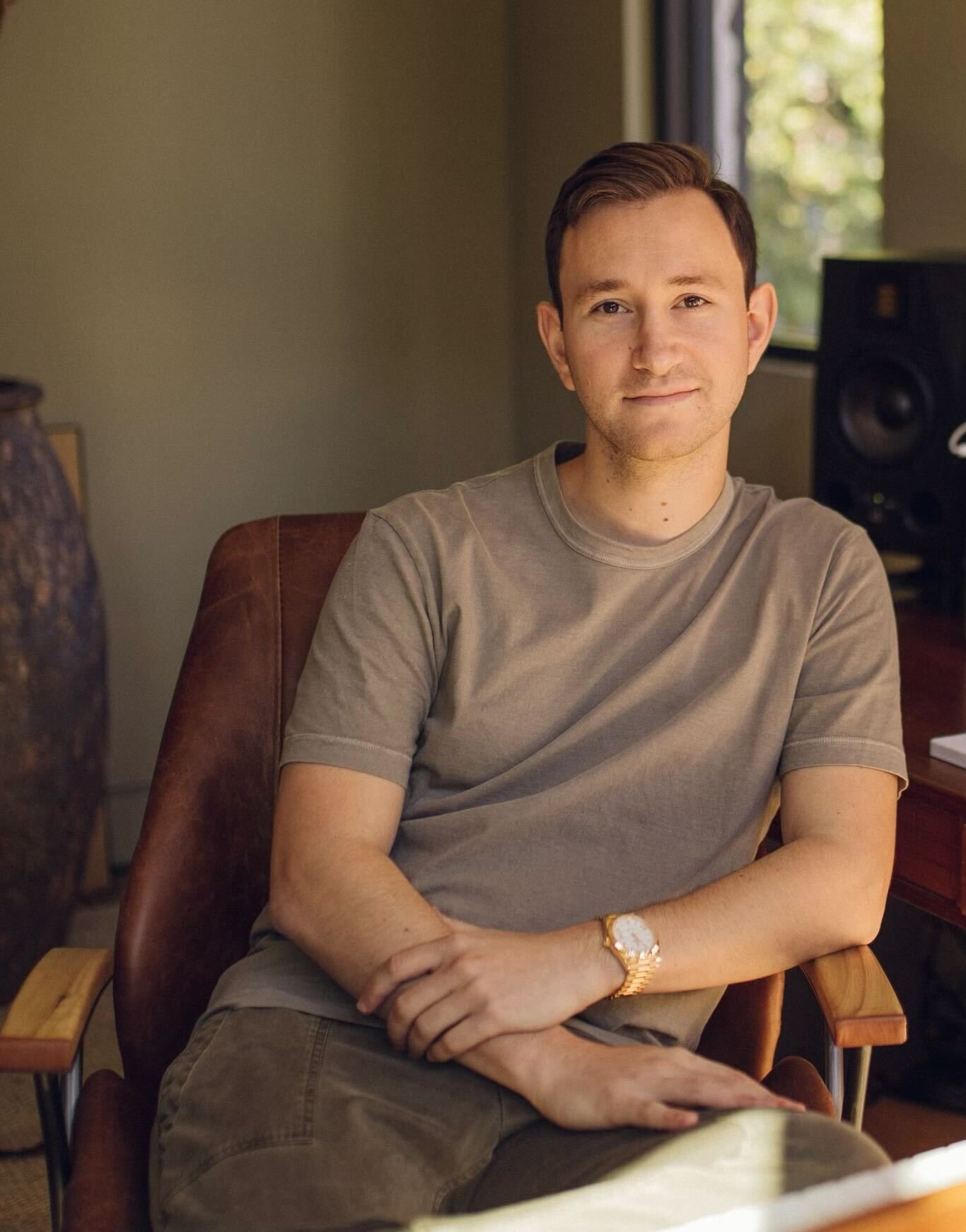
- Pollack in 2022

Background information
- Born: Michael Ross Pollack; April 26, 1994 (age 32); Roslyn, New York, U.S.
- Genre: Pop
- Occupations: Songwriter; record producer
- Years active: 2016–present

Michael Ross Pollack (born April 26, 1994) is an American songwriter and record producer. He has written songs for artists such as Miley Cyrus, Beyoncé, Maroon 5, Justin Bieber, Selena Gomez, Katy Perry, Jonas Brothers, Benson Boone, Lizzo, and Kelly Clarkson, among others. He co-wrote Maroon 5's 2019 single "Memories", which peaked atop Billboard's Radio Songs chart, along with Justin Bieber's "Ghost" and Miley Cyrus' "Flowers", for which he won the Grammy Award for Record of the Year. The latter also topped the Billboard Hot 100, becoming his first co-writing credit to do so.

== Early years ==
Pollack and his older sister were raised by their parents in Roslyn, New York. He started playing piano, singing, and writing songs at a young age. In his youth, he performed with a Billy Joel cover band and with Richie Cannata, Billy Joel's longtime saxophonist.

After graduating from high school, Pollack moved to Nashville, Tennessee to attend Vanderbilt University. During his freshman year, Billy Joel hosted a Q&A session for college students at Vanderbilt University's Langford Auditorium. Pollack, who was in the audience, asked for permission to accompany Joel on piano for a rendition of New York State of Mind, to which Joel agreed. A video of the performance was posted online and quickly went viral, landing Pollack appearances on NBC's Today show, Good Day New York, the Morning Mashup on SIRIUS XM Radio, and The Jeff Probst Show.

== Music career ==
The video also led to Pollack signing a joint publishing deal during his sophomore year of college with Warner Chappell Music and Pete Ganbarg, President of A&R at Atlantic Records, for its "Songs With A Pure Tone" label. He soon started collaborating with other songwriters, including Ingrid Andress in Nashville, while he finished his degree.

After graduating from college, Pollack moved to Los Angeles, California to live with fellow musicians Ari Leff and Michael Matosic. The trio went on to write dozens of songs for Leff and others. Pollack has also co-written songs for Beyoncé, Justin Bieber, Celine Dion, Katy Perry, Miley Cyrus, Ed Sheeran, Maroon 5, Kelly Clarkson, Jason Mraz, Backstreet Boys, Lizzo, Jonas Brothers, Meghan Trainor, Demi Lovato, Michael Bublé, John Legend and Selena Gomez.

In 2021, he co-wrote and executive produced the album Reverie by Ben Platt.

Pollack was named Songwriter of the Year at the 2022 BMI Pop Awards. Variety also listed him among "55 Queer Artists and Decision-Makers to Know in 2022." Additionally, Pollack was #10 on Genius's "Top 25 Songwriters of 2022" list.

In 2023, Pollack wrote "Flowers" by Miley Cyrus with Aldae and Cyrus. The song debuted at number one on the Billboard Hot 100, Global 200, and Global 200 Excl. U.S. charts. In the song's first week it broke the Spotify record for most streams in a single week with more than 96 million streams. It broke that record the following week with more than 115 million streams in a week. In April 2023, "Flowers" became the seventh song ever to concurrently top Billboard's Pop Airplay, Adult Pop Airplay, and Adult Contemporary charts.

Pollack wrote several songs on Cyrus' eighth studio album Endless Summer Vacation with Cyrus and Gregory "Aldae" Hein. They were conceived only with piano, then evolving into their final versions. Pollack said that Cyrus decided to focus on songcraft before tackling the production.

Pollack is managed by Jamie Zeluck-Hindlin, founder of Nonstop Management.

In 2024, Pollack was added as a principal and owner of Livelihood Music Company, an independent music publishing company.

== Discography ==
=== Selected charting and certified singles ===
List of singles as songwriter, with selected chart positions and certifications, showing year released, artist, album, and song title
Year	Artist	Album	Song	Peak chart positions						Certifications
Year	Artist	Album	Song	US	US Pop	US Adult Pop	US Adult	US Country	UK	Certifications
2017	Charli XCX	Non-album single	"Boys"	—	—	—	—	—	31	RIAA: Gold; BPI: Silver
2018	Alec Benjamin	Narrated For You	"Let Me Down Slowly" (solo or featuring Alessia Cara)	79	—	—	—	—	31	RIAA: 4× Platinum; ARIA: 2× Platinum; BPI: Platinum
2018	Zara Larsson	Poster Girl	"Ruin My Life"	76	18	22	—	—	9	RIAA: Platinum; ARIA: Platinum; BPI: Platinum
2020	Quinn XCII	A Letter to My Younger Self	"Stacy"	—	—	—	—	—	—	RIAA: Gold
2020	Lauv	~how i'm feeling~	"i'm so tired..." (with Troye Sivan)	81	21	21	—	—	8	RIAA: Platinum; ARIA: 3× Platinum; BPI: Platinum
2020	Lauv	~how i'm feeling~	"fuck, i'm lonely" (with Anne-Marie)	—	33	—	—	—	32	RIAA: Gold; ARIA: 2× Platinum; BPI: Gold
2020	Lauv	~how i'm feeling~	"Mean It" (with LANY)	—	—	—	—	—	83	RIAA: Gold; ARIA: Gold
2020	Katy Perry	Smile	"Daisies"	40	27	9	11	—	37	RIAA: Gold
2020	Zedd	Non-album single	"Funny" (featuring Jasmine Thompson)	—	33	22	—	—	—	RIAA: Gold
2020	Miley Cyrus	Plastic Hearts	"Prisoner" (featuring Dua Lipa)	54	23	21	—	—	8	RIAA: Platinum; ARIA: 2× Platinum; BPI: Platinum
2021	Justin Bieber	Justice	"Anyone"	6	12	13	13	—	4	RIAA: 2× Platinum; ARIA: Platinum; BPI: Gold
2021	Justin Bieber	Justice	"Holy" (featuring Chance The Rapper)	3	3	1	8	—	7	RIAA: 3× Platinum; ARIA: 2× Platinum; BPI: Platinum
2021	Justin Bieber	Justice	"Ghost"	5	1	1	5	—	19	RIAA: 3× Platinum; ARIA: 3× Platinum; BPI: Platinum
2021	Maroon 5	JORDI	"Memories" (solo or featuring Nipsey Hussle & YG)	2	1	1	1	—	5	RIAA: 4× Platinum; ARIA: 6× Platinum; BPI: 2× Platinum
2021	Maroon 5	JORDI	"Nobody's Love"	41	14	7	14	—	84	RIAA: Gold; ARIA: Gold
2021	Ed Sheeran	=	"Visiting Hours"	75	—	—	—	—	5	ARIA: Gold; BPI: Gold
2022	Benson Boone	Walk Me Home...	"In The Stars"	82	36	24	—	—	21	RIAA: 2× Platinum; BPI: Gold
2022	Beyoncé	Renaissance	"Pure/Honey"	64	—	—	—	—	—	RIAA: Gold
2022	Lewis Capaldi	Broken by Desire to be Heavenly Sent	"Forget Me"	58	16	7	9	—	1	ARIA: 2× Platinum; BPI: 2× Platinum
2023	Miley Cyrus	Endless Summer Vacation	"Flowers"	1	1	1	1	—	1	RIAA: 7× Platinum; ARIA: 10× Platinum; BPI: 3× Platinum
2023	Miley Cyrus	Endless Summer Vacation	"Used To Be Young"	8	4	1	7	—	12	RIAA: Platinum; ARIA: Gold; BPI: Silver
2024	Selena Gomez	Non-album single	"Love On"	56	17	14	—	—	61	
2024	Beyoncé	Cowboy Carter	"II Most Wanted" (with Miley Cyrus)	6	19	18	—	—	9	RIAA: Gold
2024	David Guetta	Artificial Paradise	"I Don't Wanna Wait" (with OneRepublic)	96	36	19	—	—	19	ARIA: Platinum; BPI: Platinum
2024	David Guetta	Non-album single	"Forever Young" (with Alphaville, Ava Max)	90	14	6	24	—	—	
2024	Shaboozey	Where I've Been, Isn't Where I'm Going	"Good News"	12	6	5	16	1	—	RIAA: 2x Platinum; BPI: Silver

=== All songwriting credits ===
List of songs as songwriter showing year released, artist, album, song title, and co-writers
Year	Artist	Album	Song	Co-written with	Ref(s).
2016	KSHMR	The Lion Across the Field	"Wildcard" (featuring Sidnie Tipton)	Niles Hollowell-Dhar, Sidnie Tipton	
2016	Attom	Non-album single	"Better" (featuring Justin Stein)	Justin Phillip Stein, Kyle Stern, Patrick Turner Hartman	
2016	Vice	Non-album single	"Steady 1234" (featuring Jasmine Thompson & Skizzy Mars)	Joe Khajadourian, Alex Schwartz, Myles Mills, Michael Leary, Ingrid Andress, Anna Graceman, Hayley Warner	
2017	Cade	Non-album single	"Sorry For Myself"	Trevor Edmund Dahl, Fadil El Ghoul, Cade Cameron Larson, Ari Leff, Jared Maldonado	
2017	Francesca Battistelli	The Shack: Music From and Inspired By the Original Motion Picture	"Where Were You"	Nolan Sipe, Jacob Leslie Hawkes, Francesca Battistelli	
2017	Colton Dixon	Identity	"Autopsy"	Colton Dixon	
2017	Autograf	Non-album single	"Simple" (featuring Victoria Zaro)	Jake Carpenter, Louis Kha, Larzz Principato, Andrew Taggart, Mikul Wing, Victoria Zaro	
2017	Charli XCX	Non-album single	"Boys"	Emily Warren, Ingrid Andress, Cass Lowe, Ari Leff, Jerker Hansson	
2017	Wingtip	Non-album single	"Cross Your Mind" (featuring Morgxn)	Ari Leff, Nicholas Perloff-Giles	
2017	Jack & Jack	Non-album single	"Beg" (solo or featuring Olivia O'Brien)	Ari Leff, Louis Schoorl, Marco Borrero	
2017	Arlissa	Non-album single	"Every Time I Breathe"	William Lobban-Bean, Arlissa JoAnn Ruppert, Jeffrey Gitelman	
2017	Molly Kate Kestner	Non-album single	"Footprints"	Ingrid Andress, Molly Kate Kestner	
2017	Kelly Clarkson	Meaning of Life	"Heat"	Andre Davidson, Jessica Ashley Karpov, Mick Shultz, Sean Davidson	
2017	Kelly Clarkson	Meaning of Life	"I Don't Think About You"	Andre Davidson, Jessica Ashley Karpov, Sean Davidson	
2018	Loote	single.	"Out of My Head"	Emma Lov Block, Jackson Foote, Jeremy Dussolliet	
2018	Cash Cash	Say It Like You Feel It	"All My Love" (featuring Conor Maynard)	Alexander Makhlouf, Ari Leff, Grace Fulmer, Jean Paul Makhlouf, Samuel Frisch	
2018	Cash Cash	Say It Like You Feel It	"Jewel" (featuring Nikki Vianna)	Alex Makhlouf, Ari Leff, Jean Paul Makhlouf, Samuel Frisch	
2018	Alina Baraz	The Color Of You	"Coming To My Senses"	Alina Baraz, Warren Felder	
2018	Jacob Sartorius	Better With You	"Up With It"	Jackson Morgan, Larzz Principato, Rick Markowitz	
2018	Alec Benjamin	Narrated For You	"Let Me Down Slowly" (solo or featuring Alessia Cara)	Alec Benjamin, Nolan Lambroza	
2018	Lauv	I met you when I was 18. (the playlist)	"Paris In the Rain"	Ari Leff, Michael Matosic	
2018	Lauv	I met you when I was 18. (the playlist)	"Paranoid"	Ari Leff, Jesse St. John Geller	
2018	Lauv	I met you when I was 18. (the playlist)	"The Story Never Ends"	Ari Leff, Michael Matosic, Carlos Cid	
2018	Lauv	I met you when I was 18. (the playlist)	"Enemies"	Ari Leff, Alexander O'Neill	
2018	Lauv	I met you when I was 18. (the playlist)	"Chasing Fire"	Ari Leff, James Sunderland, Brett Hitte	
2018	Lauv	I met you when I was 18. (the playlist)	"Bracelet"	Ari Leff, Andrew Goldstein	
2018	Lauv	I met you when I was 18. (the playlist)	"Never Not"	Ari Leff	
2018	Lauv	Non-album single	"Superhero"	Ari Leff, Martin Scherm	
2018	Dierks Bentley	The Mountain	"My Religion"	Ben Burgess, Jamie Kenney, Rick Markowitz	
2018	Jess Kent	Non-album single	"No Love Songs" (featuring Wes Period)	Britt Burton, Jessica Kent, Jorgen Odegard, Wes Period	
2018	AJ Mitchell	Hopeful	"Hopeful"	Aaron Mitchell, Svante Clas Halldin, Jakob Gustav Hazell	
2018	Halestorm	Vicious	"Conflicted"	Andre Davidson, Stephen Puth, Ingrid Andress, Joe Hottinger, Lzzy Hale	
2018	Jason Mraz	Know.	"The Other Side (Japanese Bonus Track)"	Jason Mraz, Michael Matosic	
2018	Matoma	One In A Million	"Lost At Sea"	Andreas Schuller, Ingrid Andress, Tom Stræte Lagergren	
2018	Zara Larsson	Poster Girl	"Ruin My Life"	Brittany Amaradio, Jackson Foote, Jamie Sanderson, Jordan K. Johnson, Stefan Johnson	
2018	Hailee Steinfeld	Bumblebee (Original Motion Picture Soundtrack)	"Back to Life"	Hailee Steinfeld, Jorgen Odegard, Josh Gudwin, Kennedi Lykken, Wayne Sermon	
2018	Championsleak	Non-album single	"Happy Sad Song" (featuring Symon)	Choukri Gustmann, Emilie Adams, Lukas Loules	
2018	HARIZ	Reminisce	"Think of Me"	Ari Leff, Justin Hariz	
2019	Lost Kings	Paper Crowns	"Drunk As Hell" (featuring Jesper Jenset)	Dallas Koehlke, Norris Shanholtz, Robert Abisi, Ari Leff	
2019	Lost Kings	Paper Crowns	"Anti-Everything" (featuring Loren Gray)	Brittany Amaradio, Norris Shanholtz, Robert Abisi, William Lobban-Bean	
2019	Jaira Burns	Non-album single	"Numb"	Jaira Burns, Sarah Barrios, Thomas Slinger	
2019	Backstreet Boys	DNA	"Chateau"	Cole Citrenbaum, James Newman, Stephen Wrabel, Stuart Crichton	
2019	Terror Jr	Unfortunately, Terror Jr	"Terrified"	Simon Rosen, David Singer-Vine, Lisa Vitale	
2019	Daya	Non-album single	"Insomnia"	Grace Tandon, Jacob Kasher Hindlin, Oscar Görres	
2019	Ben Platt	Sing to Me Instead	"Better"	Ben Platt, Nate Cyphert	
2019	Ben Platt	Sing to Me Instead	"In Case You Don't Live Forever"	Ben Platt, Jennifer Decilveo, Nate Cyphert	
2019	Ben Platt	Sing to Me Instead	"Older"	Ben Platt, Jennifer Decilveo, Nate Cyphert	
2019	Ben Platt	Sing to Me Instead	"RAIN"	Ben Platt, Sam Fischer, Alex Hope	
2019	Ben Platt	Sing to Me Instead	"So Will I"	Ben Platt, Finneas Baird O'Connell	
2019	Alison Wonderland	Non-album single	"Peace"	Alex Schwartz, Alexandra Sholler, Jacob Torrey, Jantine Heij, Joe Khajadourian, Roxanne Emery	
2019	Lizzo	Cuz I Love You	"Better in Color"	Melissa Jefferson, Trevor David Brown, Warren Felder, William Zaire Simmons	
2019	Eric Nam	Before We Begin	"Runaway" (solo or featuring Steve James)	Ari Leff, Emma Lov Block, Eric Nam, Flow Blow, Jackson Foote, Jay Kim	
2019	Marcus & Martinus	SOON	"Pocket Dial"	James Abrahart, Mike Sabath, Tayla Parx	
2019	Andy Grammer	Naive	"My Own Hero"	Andrew Grammer, Michael Matosic, Nicholas Oliver Ruth	
2019	Jonas Brothers	Happiness Begins	"Rollercoaster"	Casey Smith, Jonas Jeberg, Ryan Tedder, Zach Skelton	
2019	A R I Z O N A	ASYLUM	"Nostalgic"	David Labuguen, James Abrahart, Jordan K. Johnson, Nathan Esquite, Olivia Holt, PJ Bianco, Stefan Johnson, Zachary Charles	
2019	Anthony Ramos	The Good & The Bad	"The Good & The Bad"	Anthony Ramos, Jorgen Odegard, William Felder Wells	
2019	Bebe Rexha	Non-album single	"Not 20 Anymore"	Bleta Rexha, Jordan K. Johnson, Oliver Peterhof, Stefan Johnson	
2019	Bebe Rexha	Maleficent: Mistress of Evil (Original Motion Picture Soundtrack)	"You Can't Stop the Girl"	Aaron Huffman, Bleta Rexha, Evan Sult, Jeff Lin, Nate Cyphert, Sean Nelson, Alex Schwartz, Joe Khjadourian	
2019	Celine Dion	Courage	"Imperfections"	Ari Leff, Dallas Koehlke, Nicholas Perloff-Giles	
2019	GALXARA	Non-album single	"Waste My Youth"	Riana Kuring, William Simmons, Trevor Brown, Warren Felder	
2019	James Arthur	YOU	"Quite Miss Home"	Brett McLaughlin, Michael Busbee, James Arthur, Ryan Daly	
2019	Alice Chater	Non-album single	"Wonderland (My Name Is Alice)	Alice Chater, Chris Avantgarde, Lisa Vitale, William Donut	
2019	Alexander 23	I'm Sorry I Love You	"See You Later"	Alexander Glantz	
2019	Cxloe	Non-album single	"Devil You Don't"	Chloe Papandrea, Louis Schoorl, Marco Borrero	
2019	AJ Mitchell	Non-album single	"Say It Again"	Alex Schwartz, Jacob Torrey, Joe Khajadourian	
2019	Jacquie	Non-album single	"Break"	Ari Leff, Jacquie Lee	
2019	CL	In The Name Of Love	"+I Quit180327+"	CL, Brittany Amaradio, Sean Myer, Tokki	
2019	Goody Grace	Don't Forget Where You Came From	"Scumbag" (featuring blink-182)	Alex Schwartz, Goody Grace, Jacob Torrey, Joe Khajadourian, Mark Hoppus, Tom Higgenson, Travis Barker	
2019	Rochak Kohli	Good Newwz (Original Motion Picture Soundtrack)	"Dil Na Jaaneya" (with Lauv & Akasa Singh)	Ari Leff, Gurpreet Saini, Rochak Kohli	
2019	Why Don't We	Non-album single	"Chills"	Daniel Seavey, Corbyn Besson, Zach Herron, Jack Avery, Jonah Marais, Michael Matosic, Jacob Torrey	
2020	Louis the Child	Here For Now	"Don't Mind"	Ari Leff, Frederic Kennett, Robert Hauldren	
2020	Saweetie	Birds of Prey: The Album	"Sway With Me" (with GALXARA)	Adam David Small, Diamonte Harper, Earl Patrick Taylor, Jacob Uchorczak, Mich Hansen, Nick Sarazen, Norman Gimbel, Pablo Beltran Ruiz, Quavious Marshall, Randall Hammers, Riana Kuring, Tia Scola	
2020	Quinn XCII	A Letter to My Younger Self	"Stacy"	Jonathan Bellion, Jorgen Odegard, Mikael Temrowski	
2020	Restless Road	Restless Road - EP	"Take Me Home" (with Kane Brown)	Michael Matosic, Ari Leff, Bill Danoff, John Denver, Taffy Nivert	
2020	Lauv	~how i'm feeling~	"Drugs & The Internet"	Ari Leff, Michael Matosic, Jonathan Bellion, Jonathan Simpson	
2020	Lauv	~how i'm feeling~	"fuck, i'm lonely" (with Anne-Marie)	Ari Leff, Michael Matosic	
2020	Lauv	~how i'm feeling~	"Sad Forever"	Ari Leff, Jacob Torrey, Dallas Koehlke	
2020	Lauv	~how i'm feeling~	"i'm so tired..." (with Troye Sivan)	Ari Leff, Troye Sivan Mellet, Brett McLaughlin, Oscar Görres	
2020	Lauv	~how i'm feeling~	"Lonely Eyes"	Ari Leff, Michael Matosic, Nick Long, Stefan Johnson, Jordan K. Johnson, Marcus Lomax	
2020	Lauv	~how i'm feeling~	"Sims"	Ari Leff, Michael Matosic, Brandon Lowry, Jonathan Simpson	
2020	Lauv	~how i'm feeling~	"Believed"	Ari Leff, Michael Matosic, Jonathan Simpson	
2020	Lauv	~how i'm feeling~	"Feelings"	Ari Leff, Andrea Rosario, Jonathan Simpson	
2020	Lauv	~how i'm feeling~	"For Now"	Ari Leff, Michael Matosic, Anthony Rossomando	
2020	Lauv	~how i'm feeling~	"Mean It" (with LANY)	Ari Leff, Michael Matosic, Paul Klein, John Hill, Jordan Palmer	
2020	Lauv	~how i'm feeling~	"El Tejano" (featuring Sofía Reyes)	Ari Leff, Charlie Guerrero, Shari Shorte, Sofia Reyes, Ross Golan, Johan Carlsson	
2020	Lauv	~how i'm feeling~	"Tattoos Together"	Ari Leff, Jacob Kasher Hindlin, Ammar Malik	
2020	Lauv	~how i'm feeling~	"Changes"	Ari Leff, Michael Matosic	
2020	Lauv	~how i'm feeling~	"Invisible Things"	Ari Leff, Stefan Johnson, Jordan K. Johnson	
2020	Lauv	~how i'm feeling~	"Julia"	Ari Leff, Stefan Johnson, Jordan K. Johnson, Marcus Lomax	
2020	Lauv	~how i'm feeling~	"Modern Loneliness"	Ari Leff, Michael Matosic, Jonathan Simpson, Mike Elizondo	
2020	Lauv	~how i'm feeling~	"Love Like That"	Ari Leff, Teddy Geiger, Geoff Warburton, Jonathan Simpson	
2020	GALXARA	Non-album single	"Jealous of Myself" (solo or featuring Trevi Moran)	Riana Kuring, Warren Felder	
2020	GALXARA	Non-album single	"Loving Nobody"	Riana Kuring, William Simmons, Trevor Brown, Warren Felder	
2020	GALXARA	Non-album single	"I Miss The Days" (featuring Party Pupils)	Jonas Jeberg, Party Pupils, Riana Kuring, Vantage	
2020	Katy Perry	Smile	"Daisies"	Jacob Kasher Hindlin, Jonathan Bellion, Jordan K. Johnson, Katy Perry, Stefan Johnson	
2020	Katy Perry	Smile	"Teary Eyes"	Andrew Goldstein, Jacob Kasher Hindlin, Katy Perry, Madison Love	
2020	Katy Perry	Smile	"Not the End of the World"	Andrew Goldstein, Jacob Kasher Hindlin, Katy Perry, Madison Love	
2020	Isabel Merced	the better half of me	"the chase"	Ale Alberti, Justin Tranter, Isabela Merced, Kennedi Lykken, Zach Skelton	
2020	Ben Platt	Non-album single	"Everything I Did to Get to You (from Songland)"	Ester Dean, Shane McAnally, David Davis	
2020	Zedd	Non-album single	"Funny" (featuring Jasmine Thompson)	Anton Zaslavski, Casey Smith, Jasmine Thompson, Jordan K. Johnson, Marcus Lomax, Stefan Johnson	
2020	Zedd	Non-album single	"Inside Out" (featuring Griff)	Anton Zaslavski, Brittany Amaradio, Jonas Jeberg, Sarah Griffiths	
2020	Meghan Trainor	Treat Myself	"You Don't Know Me"	Alex Schwartz, Joe Khajadourian, Meghan Trainor	
2020	Cxloe	Heavy, Pt. 1	"12 Steps"	Alex Schwartz, Andrew Wells, Chloe Papandrea, Joe Khajadourian	
2020	Ashe	Ashlyn	"Save Myself"	Ashlyn Willson, Casey Smith, Jason Evigan	
2020	HRVY	Non-album single	"NEVERMIND"	Harvey Cantwell, James Abrahart, Oliver Peterhof	
2020	Whethan	Fantasy	"Hurting on Purpose" (featuring K.Flay)	Andre Davidson, Asheton Hogan, Ethan Snoreck, Grady Lee, Kristine Flaherty, Sean Davidson, Tim Randolph	
2020	MAX	Colour Vision	"Blueberry Eyes" (featuring Suga of BTS)	Imad Royal, Max Schneider, Min Yoon-gi, Rogét Chahayed	
2020	Grey	LIGHT	"RADAR"	Jake Torrey, Kyle Trewartha, Michael Trewartha	
2020	Route 94	Non-album single	"Sad Songs" (featuring L Devine)	Jonathan Simpson, Olivia Devine, Rowan Jones, Sam Roman	
2020	Max Changmin	Non-album single	"All That Love"	Ari Leff, Nick Sarazen, Max Changmin, Jake Torrey	
2020	Soleima	Powerslide	"Force Of Nature"	Brittany Amaradio, Sarah Mariegaard, Jerker Hansson, David Pramik, Emil Falk	
2020	Miley Cyrus	Plastic Hearts	"Prisoner" (featuring Dua Lipa)	Ali Tamposi, Andrew Wotman, Dua Lipa, Jonathan Bellion, Jordan K. Johnson, Marcus Lomax, Miley Cyrus, Stefan Johnson	
2020	Miley Cyrus	Plastic Hearts	"Night Crawling" (featuring Billy Idol)	Ali Tamposi, Andrew Wotman, Billy Idol, Miley Cyrus, Nathan Perez, Ryan Tedder	
2021	Charlotte Lawrence	Charlotte	"Talk You Down"	Andrew Wotman, Charlotte Lawrence, Julia Michaels, Mark Williams, Raul Cubina	
2021	Daya	The Difference	"Bad Girl"	Andrew Goldstein, Charlie Puth, Grace Tandon, Madison Love, Jacob Kasher Hindlin	
2021	Jamie Miller	Non-album single	"Hold You 'Til We're Old"	Nate Cyphert, Stephen Wrabel, Stuart Crichton	
2021	Justin Bieber	Justice	"Anyone"	Alexander Izquierdo, Andrew Wotman, Jonathan Bellion, Jordan K. Johnson, Justin Bieber, Raul Cubina, Stefan Johnson	
2021	Justin Bieber	Justice	"Holy" (featuring Chance The Rapper)	Anthony M. Jones, Chancelor Bennett, Jonathan Bellion, Jorgen Odegard, Justin Bieber, Steven Franks, Tommy Lee Brown	
2021	Justin Bieber	Justice	"Ghost"	Jonathan Bellion, Jordan K. Johnson, Justin Bieber, Stefan Johnson	
2021	Justin Bieber	Justice	"Deserve You"	Ali Tamposi, Andrew Wotman, Jonathan Bellion, Justin Bieber, Louis Bell	
2021	Justin Bieber	Justice	"Lifetime"	Alex Schwartz, Jace Logan Jennings, Jacob Greenspan, Jake Torrey, Joe Khajadourian, Justin Bieber, Scott Braun	
2021	Benny Blanco	Friends Keep Secrets 2	"Unlearn" (with Gracie Abrams)	Benjamin Levin, Blake Slatkin, Gracie Abrams, Henry Kwapis, Jack Karaszewski, Julia Michaels, Magnus August Høiberg	
2021	Demi Lovato	Dancing with the Devil... the Art of Starting Over	"My Girlfriends are My Boyfriend" (featuring Saweetie)	Demi Lovato, Diamonté Harper, Madison Love, Andrew "Pop" Wansel, Warren Felder	
2021	Demi Lovato	Dancing with the Devil... the Art of Starting Over	"Sunset"	Demi Lovato, Bianca Atterberry, Trevor David Brown, William Zaire Simmons	
2021	Malia Civetz	Heels in Hand	"Sugar Daddy"	Everett Romano, Malia Civetz	
2021	Julia Michaels	Not in Chronological Order	"Lie Like This"	Jordan K. Johnson, Julia Michaels, Stefan Johnson	
2021	Julia Michaels	Not in Chronological Order	"Undertone"	Jordan K. Johnson, Julia Michaels, Matt Zara, Stefan Johnson	
2021	Julia Michaels	Not in Chronological Order	"That's The Kind Of Woman"	Jordan K. Johnson, Julia Michaels, Stefan Johnson	
2021	Bebe Rexha	Better Mistakes	"Amore" (featuring Rick Ross)	Bleta Rexha, Harry Warren, Jack Brooks, Nate Cyphert, Rick Ross, Alex Schwartz, Joe Khajadourian	
2021	Becky G	Spirit Untamed (Original Motion Picture Soundtrack)	"You Belong (From Spirit Untamed)"	Casey Smith, Jake Torrey, Zach Skelton	
2021	Jasmine Thompson	Non-album single	"already there"	Benjamin Kohn, Jasmine Thompson, Kristen Carpenter, Maddie Eliasson, Pete Kelleher, Sebastian Daniel, Tom Barnes	
2021	Maroon 5	Jordi	"Memories" (solo or featuring Nipsey Hussle, YG)	Adam Levine, Jacob Kasher Hindlin, Jonathan Bellion, Jordan K. Johnson, Stefan Johnson, Vincent Ford	
2021	Maroon 5	Jordi	"Nobody's Love"	Nija Charles, Rosina Russell, Adam Levine, B Ham, Jacob Kasher Hindlin, Jordan K. Johnson, Kareen Lomax, Ryan Ogren, Stefan Johnson	
2021	Maroon 5	Jordi	"Lost"	Alexander Izquierdo, Ali Tamposi, Jonathan Bellion, Adam Levine, Jacob Kasher Hindlin, Jordan K. Johnson, Stefan Johnson	
2021	Maroon 5	Jordi	"Echo" (featuring blackbear)	Adam Levine, Henry Walter, Jake Torrey, Matthew Musto, Sam Roman	
2021	Maroon 5	Jordi	"Button" (featuring Anuel AA & Tainy)	Adam Levine, Alejandro Borrero, Emmanuel Gazmey Santiago, Ivanni Rodriguez, Jacob Kasher Hindlin, Johnny Simpson, Jonathan Bellion, Marco Masis, Ricardo Lopez	
2021	Jonas Brothers	Non-album single	"Remember This"	Casey Smith, Jordan K. Johnson, Stefan Johnson, Oliver Peterhof, Kevin Jonas, Nick Jonas, Ryan Tedder	
2021	Jimmie Allen	Bettie James Gold Edition	"Pray" (featuring Monica, Little Big Town)	Sean Douglas, Jessie Frasure	
2021	Ben Platt	Reverie	"king of the world, pt. 1"	Ben Platt, Shane McAnally	
2021	Ben Platt	Reverie	"childhood bedroom"	Ben Platt, Julia Michaels	
2021	Ben Platt	Reverie	"happy to be sad"	Ben Platt, Zach Skelton, Caroline Pennell	
2021	Ben Platt	Reverie	"I want love you but I don't"	Ben Platt, Alex Hope, Sam Fischer	
2021	Ben Platt	Reverie	"leave my mind"	Ben Platt, Gian Stone, Ian Kirkpatrick, Julia Michaels	
2021	Ben Platt	Reverie	"dance with you"	Ben Abraham, Gian Stone	
2021	Ben Platt	Reverie	"king of the world, pt. 2"	Ben Platt, Shane McAnally	
2021	Ben Platt	Reverie	"carefully"	Alex Hope, Ben Platt	
2021	Ben Platt	Reverie	"chasing you"	Ben Platt, Julia Michaels	
2021	Ben Platt	Reverie	"come back"	Ben Platt, Nate Cyphert	
2021	Ben Platt	Reverie	"dark times"	Ben Platt, Jake Gosling, Sean Douglas	
2021	Ben Platt	Reverie	"imagine"	Alexander Izquierdo, Ben Platt, Jonathan Bellion, Jordan K. Johnson, Stefan Johnson	
2021	Ben Platt	Reverie	"king of the world, pt. 3"	Ben Platt, Shane McAnally	
2021	DallasK	Non-album single	"Try Again" (featuring Lauv)	Ari Leff, Dallas Koehlke	
2021	Ed Sheeran	=	"Visiting Hours"	Ed Sheeran, Johnny McDaid, Anthony Clemons Jr, Amy Wadge, Scott Carter, Kim Lang Smith	
2021	Alesso	Non-album single	"Chasing Stars" (with Marshmello featuring James Bay)	Alessandro Lindblad, Marshmello, Alexander Izquierdo, James Bay, Jonathan Bellion, Jordan K. Johnson, Stefan Johnson	
2021	Troye Sivan	Non-album single	"Angel Baby"	Jason Evigan, James Abrahart, Sarah Hudson, Troye Sivan	
2021	The Wanted	Most Wanted: The Greatest Hits	"Rule The World"	Ari Leff, Jakob Hazell, Svante Halldin, Max George	
2021	Mat Kearney	January Flower	"Odds"	Mat Kearney, Robert Marvin, Zach Skelton	
2021	MØ	Motordrome	"Brad Pitt"	Ajay Bhattacharyya, Daniel Schnair, Jakub Littauer, Karen Marie Ørsted, Mads Damsgaard, Ronni Vindahl	
2021	Westlife	Wild Dreams	"Alone Together"	Gregory Aldae Hein, Ilya Salmanzadeh, Mark Feehily, Rami Yacoub, Shane Filan	
2021	Twice	Formula of Love: O+T=<3	"Moonlight"	Jake Torrey, Destiny Rogers, Jeremy Reeves, Jonathan Yip, Ray Charles McCullough II, Ray Romulus	
2022	Michael Bublé	Higher	"I'll Never Not Love You"	Michael Bublé	
2022	Michael Bublé	Higher	"Mother"	Greg Wells, Jonathan Bellion, Michael Bublé	
2022	Andy Grammer	Monster	"Joy"	Andrew Grammer, Mark Nilan Jr	
2022	Jennifer Lopez	Marry Me (Original Motion Picture Soundtrack)	"On My Way (Marry Me)"	Kayla Bonnici, Leroy Clampitt	
2022	Jennifer Lopez	Marry Me (Original Motion Picture Soundtrack)	"Marry Me (Kat & Bastian Duet)" (with Maluma)	Edgar Barrera, Jordan Johnson, Stefan Johnson, Oliver Peterhof, Maluma, Nick Sarazen, Olivia Waithe	
2022	Said The Sky	Sentiment	"Emotion Sickness" (with Will Anderson & Parachute)	Casey Smith, Jake Torrey, Nicholas Miller, Trevor Christensen	
2022	for KING & COUNTRY	What Are We Waiting For?	"Love Me Like I Am" (solo or with Jordin Sparks)	Joel Smallbone, Luke Smallbone, Josh Kerr	
2022	Benson Boone	Walk Me Home...	"In The Stars"	Benson Boone, Jason Evigan	
2022	Jonah Kagen	georgia got colder	"Barcelona"	Jonah Kagen, Davin Kingston	
2022	Reneé Rapp	Non-album single	"Tattoos"	Andrew Goldstein, Anton Göransson, Isabella Sjöstrand, Jacob Kasher Hindlin, Reneé Rapp	
2022	Reneé Rapp	Everything to Everyone	"In The Kitchen"	Darrius Coleman, Jordan K. Johnson, Stefan Johnson, Oliver Peterhof, Reneé Rapp, Taylor Hill, Tommy Brown, 3 On A Wav	
2022	Two Friends	Non-album single	"Timebomb" (featuring MOD SUN)	Derek Smith, Eli Sones, Matt Halper, Jake Torrey, Zach Skelton	
2022	James Bay	Leap	"Nowhere Left To Go"	James Bay, Jacob Kasher Hindlin	
2022	Burna Boy	Love, Damini	"Wild Dreams" (featuring Khalid)	Alli Odunayo, Damini Ebunoluwa Ogulu, Jonathan Bellion, Jordan K. Johnson, Stefan Johnson, Khalid Robinson	
2022	Lizzo	Special	"Birthday Girl"	Jonathan Bellion, Melissa Jefferson, Jordan K. Johnson, Stefan Johnson, Theron Thomas	
2022	Beyoncé	Renaissance	"Pure/Honey"	Andrew Richardson, Beyoncé, Brittany Coney, Count Maurice, Darius Dixon, Denisia Andrews, Eric Snead, Jerel Black, Kevin Marquis Bellmon, Michael D. Cox, Michael Tucker, Mike Q, Moi Renée, Raphael Saadiq, Terius Nash	
2022	Anitta	Versions of Me	"Lobby" (with Missy Elliott)	Larissa Machado, Missy Elliott, Nija Charles, Ryan Tedder, Zach Skelton	
2022	Demi Lovato	Holy Fvck	"Freak" (featuring Yungblud)	Alex Niceforo, Demi Lovato, Dominic Harrison, Keith Sorrells, Laura Veltz, Warren Felder	
2022	John Legend	Legend	"All She Wanna Do" (solo or featuring Saweetie)	Diamonte Harper, Jake Torrey, Jeff Halavacs, John Stephens, Jordan K. Johnson, Stefan Johnson, Larrance Dopson, Ryan Tedder, Tia Scola, Zach Skelton	
2022	John Legend	Legend	"Nervous" (solo or featuring Sebastián Yatra)	John Ryan, John Stephens	
2022	John Legend	Legend	"I Don't Love You Like I Used To"	Davin Kingston, Gian Stone, John Stephens	
2022	5 Seconds of Summer	5SOS5	"Older" (featuring Sierra Deaton)	Luke Hemmings, Michael Clifford, Sierra Deaton	
2022	Lauv	All 4 Nothing	"Forever"	Ari Leff, Dallas Koehlke, Jake Torrey	
2022	Fletcher	Girl Of My Dreams	"Conversations"	Cari Fletcher, Jacob Kasher Hindlin, Madison Love, Marshmello, Daniel Couture	
2022	Adam Melchor	Here Goes Nothing!	"Cry"	Adam Melchor, Ian Fitchuk, Nick Long	
2022	Joshua Bassett	Non-album single	"Different"	Joshua Bassett, Noah Conrad, Sissy Smith	
2022	Selena Gomez	Non-album single	"My Mind & Me"	Amy Allen, Jonathan Bellion, Jordan K. Johnson, Stefan Johnson, Selena Gomez	
2023	Noa Kirel	Non-album single	"Gone"	Casey Smith, Jordan K. Johnson, Stefan Johnson, Marcus Lomax, Oliver Peterhof	
2023	Rowan Drake	Non-album single	"Elephant In The Room"	Ben Fielding, Benson Boone, Dan Gleyzer, Dean Ussher, Jason Evigan, Rollo, Rowan Drake	
2023	Rosa Linn	Lay Your Hands Upon My Heart	"Never Be Mine"	Ben Kohn, Pete Kelleher, Tom Barnes, Rosa Linn, Sissy Smith	
2023	Mike Sabath	Being Human	"Hers"	Alessandro Buccellati, Austin Lichtenstein, John Sterling, Michael Sabath, Pete Millier, Steph Jones	
2023	Lori McKenna	The Songwriter Tapes, Vol. 3	"If I Had Known" (with Luke Laird, Barry Dean)	Lori McKenna, Barry Dean	
2023	Jonas Brothers	The Album	"Sail Away"	Nick Jonas, Joe Jonas, Kevin Jonas, Jonathan Bellion, Jordan K. Johnson, Stefan Johnson, Pete Nappi, Jason Cornet, Calle Lehmann	
2023	Jonas Brothers	The Album	"Celebrate!"	Nick Jonas, Joe Jonas, Kevin Jonas, Jonathan Bellion, Jordan K. Johnson, Stefan Johnson, Alexander Izquierdo, Pete Nappi, Jason Cornet	
2023	Jonas Brothers	The Album	"Summer Baby"	Nick Jonas, Joe Jonas, Kevin Jonas, Jonathan Bellion, Jordan K. Johnson, Stefan Johnson, Gregory Aldae Hein, Pete Nappi, Jason Cornet	
2023	Jonas Brothers	The Album	"Little Bird"	Nick Jonas, Joe Jonas, Kevin Jonas, Jonathan Bellion, Jordan K. Johnson, Stefan Johnson, Gregory Aldae Hein, Pete Nappi, Jason Cornet	
2023	Brandy Clark	Brandy Clark	"Dear Insecurity" (featuring Brandi Carlisle)	Brandy Clark	
2023	Brandy Clark	Brandy Clark	"All Over Again"	Brandy Clark	
2023	G Herbo	Fast X (Original Motion Picture Soundtrack)	"My City" (with 24kGoldn, Kane Brown)	Corbyn Besson, Daniel Seavey, Golden Landis Von Jones, Henry Walter, Herbert Randall Wright III, Jacob Torrey, Jonah Marais, Jonny Capeci, Jussi Karvinen, Kane Brown	
2023	Kim Petras	Feed the Beast	"uhoh"	Ian Kirkpatrick, Kim Petras, Madison Love	
2023	Kim Petras	Feed the Beast	"Minute"	Ali Tamposi, Isaiah Tejada, Jacob Kasher Hindlin, Jordan K. Johnson, Stefan Johnson, Kim Petras, Sarah Faith-Griffiths	
2023	Loud Luxury	Non-album single	"If Only I" (with Two Friends featuring Bebe Rexha)	Andrew Fedyk, Joseph Depace, Bleta Rexha, Eli Sones, Matthew Halper, Gregory Aldae Hein, Jordan K. Johnson, Stefan Johnson, Nick Henriques, Nija Charles, Shaun Frank	
2023	Glaive	I Care So Much That I Don't Care at All	"Tiziana"	Ash Gutierrez, Jeff Hazin, Jordan K. Johnson, Stefan Johnson	
2023	Ava Max	Diamonds & Dancefloors	"Million Dollar Baby"	Amanda Ava Koci, Jessica Agombar, David Stewart, Diane Warren, Peter Rycroft, Henry Walter, Casey Smith	
2023	Ava Max	Diamonds & Dancefloors	"Diamonds & Dancefloors"	Amanda Ava Koci, Caroline Ailin, Henry Walter	
2023	Ava Max	Barbie the Album	"Choose Your Fighter"	Amanda Ava Koci, Madison Love, Henry Walter	
2023	Zayn	Non-album single	"Love Like This"	Jon Bellion, Jordan K. Johnson, Stefan Johnson, Zayn Malik	
2023	Lauv	Non-album single	"Love U Like That"	Ari Leff, Annika Bennett, Federico Vindver	
2023	Daniel Seavey	Dancing In The Dark	"Fall into You"	Dan Wilson, Daniel Seavey, Jeff Gitelman, Kevin Theodore	
2023	Daniel Seavey	Dancing In The Dark	"Give It A Week"	Antony Muse, Daniel Seavey	
2023	Daniel Seavey	Dancing In The Dark	"Nothing Compares To You"	Antony Muse, Daniel Seavey	
2023	Jon Batiste	World Music Radio	"Raindance" (featuring Native Soul)	Andre Lindal, Jason Cornet, Jon Batiste, Jon Bellion, Jordan K. Johnson, Stefan Johnson, Justin Bieber, Nasri Atjeh, Pete Nappi, Rodney Jerkins, Sean Anderson	
2023	Miley Cyrus	Endless Summer Vacation	"Flowers"	Gregory Aldae Hein, Miley Cyrus	
2023	Miley Cyrus	Endless Summer Vacation	"You"	Miley Cyrus, Bibi Bourelly, Ian Kirkpatrick	
2023	Miley Cyrus	Endless Summer Vacation	"Muddy Feet" (featuring Sia)	Bibi Bourelly, David Frank, Gregory Aldae Hein, Jesse Shatkin, Jesse van der Meulen, Michael Len Williams II, Miley Cyrus, Pam Sheyne, Sia Furler, Steve Kipner	
2023	Miley Cyrus	Endless Summer Vacation	"Island"	BJ Burton, Caitlyn Smith, Dani Miller, Jennifer Decilveo, Miley Cyrus	
2023	Miley Cyrus	Endless Summer Vacation	"Wonder Woman"	Gregory Aldae Hein, Miley Cyrus	
2023	Miley Cyrus	Endless Summer Vacation	"Used To Be Young"	Gregory Aldae Hein, Miley Cyrus	
2023	Iann Dior	Non-album single	"You Don't Even"	Federico Vindver, Jacob Kasher Hindlin, Jacob Torrey, Michael Olmo	
2023	Thirty Seconds to Mars	It's the End of the World but It's a Beautiful Day	"Never Not Love You"	Ammar Malik, Jared Leto, Shannon Leto, Jordan K. Johnson, Stefan Johnson, Oliver Peterhof	
2023	JP Saxe	A Grey Area	"Anywhere"	James Ho, JP Saxe, Jordan K. Johnson, Stefan Johnson	
2023	LANY	a beautiful blur	"Heartbreak Can Wait"	Andrew Haas, John Ryan, Paul Jason Klein, Ryan Tedder	
2023	Blink-182	One More Time...	"You Don't Know What You've Got"	Mark Hoppus, Nick Long, Tom DeLonge, Travis Barker	
2023	Justin Timberlake	Trolls Band Together (Original Motion Picture Soundtrack)	"Perfect" (with Eric Andre, Daveed Diggs, Kid Cudi, Troye Sivan)	Emily Warren, Justin Timberlake, Mike Elizondo	
2023	Andrew Rannells	Trolls Band Together (Original Motion Picture Soundtrack)	"Watch Me Work" (with Brianna Mazzola)	Emily Warren, Justin Timberlake, Mike Elizondo	
2023	Camila Cabello	Trolls Band Together (Original Motion Picture Soundtrack)	"It Takes Two" (with Anna Kendrick, Justin Timberlake, Eric Andre, Daveed Diggs, Kid Cudi)	Emily Warren, Justin Timberlake, Mike Elizondo	
2023	Andrew Rannells	Trolls Band Together (Original Motion Picture Soundtrack)	"Mount Rageous" (with Brianna Mazzola)	Dean Pitchford, Michael Gore, Emily Warren, Justin Timberlake, Mike Elizondo, Theodore Shapiro	
2023	Justin Timberlake	Trolls Band Together (Original Motion Picture Soundtrack)	"Family" (with Anna Kendrick, Camila Cabello, Eric Andre, Daveed Diggs, Kid Cudi, Troye Sivan)	Emily Warren, Justin Timberlake, Mike Elizondo	
2023	Jung Kook	Golden	"Shot Glass of Tears"	David Stewart, Gregory Aldae Hein, Jessica Agombar	
2023	Jonas Brothers	Non-album single	"Strong Enough" (featuring Bailey Zimmerman)	Amy Allen, Jon Bellion, Jordan K. Johnson, Stefan Johnson, Keith Richards, Mick Jagger, Thomas Edward Percy Hull	
2023	Dove Cameron	Alchemical: Vol. 1	"Sand"	Dove Cameron, Isaiah Tejada, Jordan K. Johnson, Stefan Johnson, UPSAHL	
2023	Reneé Rapp	Snow Angel	"I Do"	Alexander Glantz, Andrew Wansel, Jordan K. Johnson, Stefan Johnson, Oliver Peterhof, Petros Anastos-Prastacos, Reneé Rapp, Victoria Zaro	
2023	Billy Porter	Black Mona Lisa	"Audacity"	Alex Bilowitz, Billy Porter, Brandon Cobein, Jussi Karvinen, Justin Tranter	
2024	Lewis Capaldi	Broken by Desire to be Heavenly Sent (Extended Edition)	"Forget Me"	Lewis Capaldi, Philip Plested, Tom Barnes, Pete Kelleher, Benjamin Kohn	
2024	Lewis Capaldi	Broken by Desire to be Heavenly Sent (Extended Edition)	"Love The Hell Out Of You"	Lewis Capaldi, Philip Plested, Tom Barnes, Pete Kelleher, Benjamin Kohn	
2024	Lewis Capaldi	Broken by Desire to be Heavenly Sent (Extended Edition)	"Strangers"	Lewis Capaldi, Jordan K. Johnson, Stefan Johnson	
2024	Lewis Capaldi	Broken by Desire to be Heavenly Sent (Extended Edition)	"Someone I Could Die For"	Lewis Capaldi, Peter Kelleher, Phil Plested	
2024	Angourie Rice	Mean Girls (Music From The Motion Picture)	"What Ifs"	Jeff Richmond, Nell Benjamin, Reneé Rapp	
2024	Fletcher	In Search of the Antidote	"Lead Me On"	Cari Fletcher, Gregory Aldae Hein, Jason Cornet, Jon Bellion, Jordan K. Johnson, Stefan Johnson, Pete Nappi	
2024	Fletcher	In Search of the Antidote	"Maybe I Am"	Cari Fletcher, Gregory Aldae Hein, Jordan K. Johnson, Stefan Johnson, Oliver Peterhof	
2024	Jennifer Lopez	This Is Me... Now	"Broken Like Me"	Angel Lopez, Atia Boggs, Douglas Ford, Federico Vindver, Jeff Gitelman, Jennifer Lopez, Rogét Chahayed	
2024	LAY	STEP	"Run Back To You" (with Lauv)	Adam Halliday, Ari Leff, Castle, Connor McDonough, Lay Zhang, Riley McDonough, Ryan Daly, Toby McDonough	
2024	Selena Gomez	Non-album single	"Love On"	Selena Gomez, Julia Michaels, Jordan K. Johnson, Stefan Johnson, Isaiah Tejada	
2024	Pharrell Williams	Non-album single	"Doctor (Work It Out)" (featuring Miley Cyrus)	Miley Cyrus, Pharrell Williams	
2024	Wendy	Wish You Hell	"Best Ever"	Jorgen Odegard, Skyler Stonestreet, James Lavigne, Jo In-ho	
2024	Justin Timberlake	Everything I Thought It Was	"Play"	Andrew DeRoberts, Federico Vindver, Floyd Nathaniel Hills, Justin Timberlake, Ryan Tedder, Zach Skelton	
2024	Beyoncé	Cowboy Carter	"II Most Wanted" (with Miley Cyrus)	Beyoncé, Miley Cyrus, Ryan Tedder	
2024	Ben Platt	Honeymind	"Honeymind"	Ben Platt, Sam Roman	
2024	Bon Jovi	Forever	"Seeds"	Jon Bon Jovi, Ryan Tedder, Sean Douglas	
2024	Jenna Raine	Non-album single	"Hypothetically"	Jenna Raine, Leroy Clampitt, Sissy Smith	
2024	Pete Yorn	The Hard Way	"Real Good Love"	Josh Gudwin, Pete Yorn	
2024	Presley Regier	Non-album single	"Typical"	Aaron Shadrow, Jahnei Clarke, Jasper Harris, Presley Regier	
2024	Charlieonnafriday	Wild Child	"That's What I Get"	Charlie Finch, Gregory Aldae Hein, Jordan K. Johnson, Stefan Johnson, Oliver Peterhof	
2024	Jelly Roll	Beautifully Broken	"Get By"	Jason Deford, Jon Bellion, Jordan K. Johnson, Stefan Johnson, Ryan Tedder	
2024	Maren Morris	Intermission	"because, of course"	Laura Veltz, Maren Morris, Mike Elizondo	
2024	Maren Morris	The Wild Robot (Original Motion Picture Soundtrack)	"Kiss the Sky"	Ali Tamposi, Delacey, Jordan K. Johnson, Stefan Johnson, Kris Bowers, Maren Morris	
2024	Maren Morris	The Wild Robot (Original Motion Picture Soundtrack)	"Even When I'm Not"	Ali Tamposi, Delacey, Jordan K. Johnson, Stefan Johnson, Isaiah Tejada	
2024	Tori Kelly	TORI.	"Shine On"	Clyde Lawrence, Jordan Cohen, Jason Cornet, Jon Bellion, Jordan K. Johnson, Stefan Johnson, Tori Kelly	
2024	Nate Smith	California Gold	"Not of This Earth"	Jake Torrey, Jordan K. Johnson, Stefan Johnson, Oliver Peterhof	
2024	David Guetta	Artificial Paradise	"I Don't Wanna Wait" (with OneRepublic)	Gregory Aldae Hein, Brent Kutzle, David Guetta, Jakke Erixson, Josh Varnadore, Ryan Tedder, Timofey Reznikov, Tyler Spry	
2024	David Guetta	Non-album single	"Forever Young" (with Alphaville, Ava Max)	Amanda Ibanez, Bernhard Lloyd, David Guetta, Frank Mertens, Jakke Erixson, Marian Gold, Timofey Reznikov	
2024	Jennifer Hudson	The Gift Of Love	"Make It To Christmas"	Federico Vindver, Jacob Kasher Hindlin, Jennifer Hudson	
2024	Jennifer Hudson	The Gift Of Love	"Santa For Someone"	Federico Vindver, Jacob Kasher Hindlin, Jennifer Hudson	
2024	Lauv	Non-album single	"Potential"	Raul Cubina, Mark Williams, Madison Love, Kii Kinsella, Jason Cornet, Jarrod Morgan, CASTLE, Ari Leff	
2024	Lauv	Non-album single	"Because Of You"	Federico Vindver, Ari Leff	
2024	Shaboozey	Where I've Been, Isn't Where I'm Going	"Good News"	Jake Torrey, Collins Obinna Chibueze, Nevin Sastry, Sam Roman, Sean Cook	
2024	Tyla	Non-album single	"Tears"	Divine Lightbody, Livvi Franc, Matthew Burnett, Mikkel Storleer Eriksen, Theron Thomas, Tor Erik Hermansen, Tyla Seethal	
2024	Rosé	Rosie	"Two Years"	Chae Young Park, Gregory Aldae Hein, Isaiah Tejada, Jordan K. Johnson, Stefan Johnson	
2024	Rosé	Rosie	"Toxic Till the End"	Chae Young Park, Emily Warren, Evan Blair	
2024	Rosé	Rosie	"Call It the End"	Chae Young Park, Emily Warren, Elof Loelv, Griff Clawson	
2024	Khalid	Sincere	"Skin"	Khalid Robinson, Jeremy Malvin, Gregory Aldae Hein	
2025	Gloria Gaynor	Non-album single	"Fida Known"	Chris Stevens, Gloria Gaynor	
2025	Walk off the Earth	Please Don't Go	"Please Don't Go"	Davin Kingston, Jonah Kagen, Gianni Luminati Nicassio, Sarah Blackwood, Tokyo Speirs	
2025	Ingrid Andress	Non-album single	"Footprints"	Ingrid Andress	
2025	Daniel Seavey	Second Wind	"The Older You Get"	Amanda Ibanez, BJ Burton, Daniel Seavey, Ehren Ebbage	
2025	Daniel Seavey	Second Wind	"Lose Me Like You Mean It"	Dalton Diehl, Daniel Seavey, James Essien, Kristin Carpenter, Soren Breum Skovsted, William Frederik Asingh	
2025	Daniel Seavey	Second Wind	"Blondes"	Daniel Seavey, Delacey, Ido Zmishlany, James Alan Ghaleb	
2025	Daniel Seavey	Second Wind	"Your Light"	Daniel Seavey, Nick Long, Rob Milton, Sam Romans, Soren Breum Skovsted, William Frederik Asingh	
2025	Daniel Seavey	Second Wind	"Gateway Drug"	Daniel Seavey, Sam Roman, Nick Long	
2025	Daniel Seavey	Second Wind	"Sleeping With The Lights On"	Daniel Seavey, Jackson Morgan, Steve Mac	
2025	Daniel Seavey	Second Wind	"You Let Me Down"	Daniel Seavey, Noah Conrad, Cleo Tighe	
2025	Daniel Seavey	Second Wind	"If I Ever Get To Heaven"	Daniel Seavey, Gordon Sampson, Tenille Nadkrynechny, Tina Parol	
2025	Daniel Seavey	Second Wind	"Other People"	Andrew Luce, Daniel Seavey, David Alexander, Felicia Ferraro, Isaiah Tejada, Jordan K. Johnson, Stefan Johnson	
2025	Daniel Seavey	Non-album single	"Eden"	Daniel Seavey	
2025	Selena Gomez	I Said I Love You First	"Sunset Blvd" (with Benny Blanco)	Amanda Ibanez, Benjamin Levin, Jeremy Malvin, Justin Tranter, Magnus Hoiberg, Selena Gomez	
2025	Maren Morris	Dreamsicle	"because, of course"	Laura Veltz, Maren Morris, Mike Elizondo	
2025	Maren Morris	Dreamsicle	"lemonade"	Ali Tamposi, Isaiah Tejada, Jordan K. Johnson, Stefan Johnson, Maren Morris	
2025	Halsey	From the World of John Wick: Ballerina (Original Motion Picture Soundtrack)	"Hand That Feeds" (with Amy Lee)	Amy Lee, Griff Clawson, Halsey, Jordan Fish	
2025	Felix Jaehn	Non-album single	"Pride" (with JHart)	Felix Jaehn, JHart, JUNKX, Mike Sabath	
2025	Teddy Swims	I've Tried Everything but Therapy	"God Went Crazy"	Jaten Dimsdale, Jeff Gitty, John Ryan, Jon Billion, Julian Bunetta, Jordan Johnson, Stefan Johnson	
2025	Maroon 5	Love Is Like	"Priceless" (featuring Lisa)	Adam Levine, Ali Tamposi, Federico Vindver, Jacob Kasher Hindlin, Lalisa Manobal, Rhea Rajagopalan, Sam Farrar	
2025	Maroon 5	Love Is Like	"All Night"	Adam Levine, Federico Vindver, Jacob Kasher Hindlin, James Valentine, Sam Farrar	
2025	Ava Max	Don't Click Play	"Know Somebody"	Amanda Ibanez, Amanda Ava Koci, Federico Vindver, JBach, Joshua Coleman, Kyle Buckley	
2025	Miley Cyrus	Something Beautiful	"Prelude"	Miley Cyrus, Maxx Morando, Cole Haden, Shawn Everett, Jonathan Rado	
2025	Miley Cyrus	Something Beautiful	"Something Beautiful"	Miley Cyrus, Maxx Morando, Max Taylor-Sheppard, Ryan Beatty	
2025	Miley Cyrus	Something Beautiful	"End of the World"	Miley Cyrus, Gregory Aldae Hein, Shawn Everett, Jonathan Rado, Molly Rankin, Alec O'Hanley	
2025	Miley Cyrus	Something Beautiful	"More to Lose"	Miley Cyrus, Autumn Rowe	
2025	Miley Cyrus	Something Beautiful	"Interlude 1"	Miley Cyrus, Maxx Morando, Max Taylor-Sheppard, Shawn Everett, Jonathan Rado	
2025	Miley Cyrus	Something Beautiful	"Easy Lover"	Miley Cyrus, Ryan Tedder, Omer Fedi	
2025	Miley Cyrus	Something Beautiful	"Interlude 2"	Miley Cyrus, Maxx Morando, Shawn Everett, Jonathan Rado	
2025	Miley Cyrus	Something Beautiful	"Golden Burning Sun"	Miley Cyrus, Shawn Everett, Jonathan Rado, Bibi Bourelly, Tobias Jesso Jr.	
2025	Miley Cyrus	Something Beautiful	"Walk of Fame" (featuring Brittany Howard)	Miley Cyrus, Maxx Morando, Shawn Everett, Brittany Howard, Jonathan Rado	
2025	Miley Cyrus	Something Beautiful	"Pretend You're God"	Miley Cyrus, Maxx Morando, Gregory Aldae Hein, Andrew Wyatt, Emile Haynie, Shawn Everett, Jonathan Rado	
2025	Miley Cyrus	Something Beautiful	"Every Girl You've Ever Loved" (featuring Naomi Cambell)	Miley Cyrus, Shawn Everett, Molly Rankin, Alec O'Hanley, Jonathan Rado, Marie Davidson, David Dewaele, Stephen Dewaele, Pierre Guerineau	
2025	Miley Cyrus	Something Beautiful	"Reborn"	Miley Cyrus, Maxx Morando, Gregory Aldae Hein, Max Taylor-Sheppard, Shawn Everett, Jonathan Rado, Ethan Shevin, Ian Gold	
2025	Miley Cyrus	Something Beautiful	"Secrets" (featuring Lindsey Buckingham & Mick Fleetwood)	Miley Cyrus, Shawn Everett, Jonathan Rado, Tom Hull, Tyler Johnson	
2025	Miley Cyrus	Something Beautiful	"Lockdown" (featuring David Byrne)	Miley Cyrus, Maxx Morando, Gregory Aldae Hein, Max Taylor-Sheppard, Shawn Everett, Jonathan Rado, David Byrne, Pino Palladino	
2025	Miley Cyrus	Non-album single	"Maybe It's"	Miley Cyrus, Shawn Everett, Jonathan Rado	
2025	Khalid	After the Sun Goes Down	"please don't call (333)"	Grant Boutin, Khalid Robinson, Ryan Tedder	
2025	Khalid	After the Sun Goes Down	"nobody (make me feel)" (with oskar med k)	Griff Clawson, Khalid Robinson, Oskar Sjavag	
2025	Presley Regier	Non-album single	"Kiss"	Jasper Harris, Presley Regier	
2025	Presley Regier	Non-album single	"Cult"	Sean Douglas, Presley Regier	
2025	Presley Regier	Non-album single	"The Things"	Presley Regier	
2025	Presley Regier	Non-album single	"Apartment"	Presley Regier	
2025	Sekou	In a World We Don't Belong (Pt. 1)	"Love Language"	Jeff Gitelman, Stefan Johnson, Jordan Johnson, Sekou Sylla, Theron Thomas, Jon Bellion	
2025	Sekou	In a World We Don't Belong (Pt. 1)	"About Last Night"	Jasper Harris, Sekou Sylla, Sam Dew, Mark Spears, Victor Ekpo, Matthew Bernard, Noah Ehler	
2026	Lauv	songs i couldn't forget	"fake it"	Ari Leff, Michael Matosic	
2026	Lauv	songs i couldn't forget	"insecure"	Ari Leff, Michael Matosic	
2026	Warren Zeiders	Non-album single	"Drinking Game"	Warren Zeiders, Evan Blair, Elof Loelv, Jacob Kasher Hindlin, Jesse Fink	
2026	Rosalía	Lux	"Focu 'Ranni"	Rosalía, LunchMoney Lewis, Nija Charles, Jeff "Gitty" Gitelman, Stefan Johnson, Jordan K. Johnson, Noah Goldstein, Dylan Wiggins, Elliott Kozel	
2026	Lewis Capaldi	Survive	"Stay Love"	Lewis Capaldi, Stefan Johnson, Jordan K. Johnson	
2026	Maroon 5	Non-album single	"Heroine"	Adam Levine, John Ryan, Jacob Kasher Hindlin, Philip Plested	
2026	Sienna Spiro	Visitor	"Die On This Hill"	Omer Fedi, Sienna Spiro	
2026	Sienna Spiro	Visitor	"The Visitor"	Omer Fedi, Sienna Spiro	
2026	Sienna Spiro	Visitor	"Material Lover"	Omer Fedi, Sienna Spiro	
2026	Sienna Spiro	Visitor	"Great Expectation"	Omer Fedi, Sienna Spiro	
2026	Maise Peters	Florescence	"Questions"	Maise Peters, Griff Clawson	
2026	Latto	Big Mama	"Mama" (featuring Jelly Roll)	Alyssa Stephens, Darryl Clemons, Kevin Andre Price, Jeff Gitelman, Jordan K. Johnson, Stefan Johnson, Nija Charles, Jason Bradley DeFord, Edward Maclin Cooper III	
2026	Myles Smith	My Mess, My Heart, My Life	"Hate You"	Myles Smith, Peter Fenn, Jesse Fink, Sam Romans, Griff Clawson, Alexander Izquierdo	
2026	Myles Smith	My Mess, My Heart, My Life	"Mary's Song"	Myles Smith, Peter Fenn, Jesse Fink, Sam Romans, Griff Clawson, Steph Jones	
2026	Debbii Dawson	Where Have All The Good Men Gone?	"Money"	Griff Clawson, Debbii Dawson	
2026	Stella Lefty	Long Way Home	"Lean In, Kiss Me"	Stella Lefty, Grace Enger, Joe Reeves, Jacob Kasher Hindlin, Julia Michaels	
2026	Katseye	WILD	"That Way"	Johnny Goldstein, Feli Ferraro	
2026	Miley Cyrus	Non-album single	"Younger You" (solo or featuring Lainey Wilson)	Miley Cyrus, Stefan Johnson, Jordan Johnson, Gregory Aldae Hein, Jon Bellion	
2026	Miley Cyrus	Bass Persuades	"Bass Persuades"	Miley Cyrus, Kid Harpoon, Gregory Aldae Hein	
2026	Miley Cyrus	Bass Persuades	"Different Religion" (featuring Model/Actriz)	Miley Cyrus, Kid Harpoon, Ruben Radlauer, Jack Wetmore, Cole Haden, Aaron Shapiro	
2026	Miley Cyrus	Bass Persuades	"Let's Get Married"	Miley Cyrus, Stefan Johnson, Jordan Johnson, Gregory Aldae Hein	
2026	Miley Cyrus	Bass Persuades	"Orbit"	Miley Cyrus, Stefan Johnson, Jordan Johnson	
2026	Miley Cyrus	Bass Persuades	"Aftermath"	Miley Cyrus, Griff Clawson, Stefan Johnson, Jordan Johnson, Maxx Morondo	
2026	Miley Cyrus	Bass Persuades	"REDLIGHTS"	Miley Cyrus	
2026	Miley Cyrus	Bass Persuades	"Neon Signs" (featuring Andrew Wyatt of Miike Snow)	Miley Cyrus, Kid Harpoon	
2026	Miley Cyrus	Bass Persuades	"Snow"	Miley Cyrus, Kid Harpoon, Ruben Radlauer, Jack Wetmore, Cole Haden, Aaron Shapiro, Gregory Aldae Hein	
2026	Miley Cyrus	Bass Persuades	"Smile"	Miley Cyrus, Kid Harpoon, Gregory Aldae Hein	
2026	Brandy Clark	Non-album single	"American Roots"	Brandy Clark, Griff Clawson	

=== Production credits ===
List of songs as producer showing year released, artist, album, song title, and co-producers
Year	Artist	Album	Song	Co-produced with	Ref(s).
2018	Lauv	I Met You When I Was 18 (The Playlist)	"Chasing Fire"	Lauv	
2018	Lauv	I Met You When I Was 18 (The Playlist)	"Never Not"	Lauv	
2019	Ben Platt	Sing to Me Instead	"Older"	Jenn Decilveo	
2020	Ashe	Ashlyn	"Save Myself"	Jason Evigan, Big Taste	
2021	Justin Bieber	Justice	"Holy" (featuring Chance The Rapper)	Jorgen Odegard, Jon Bellion, Tommy Brown, Steven Franks	
2021	Justin Bieber	Justice	"Lifetime"	The Futuristics, Jake Torrey	
2021	Demi Lovato	Dancing with the Devil... the Art of Starting Over	"Sunset"	The Orphanage	
2021	Ben Platt	Born This Way Reimagined: The Tenth Anniversary	"You and I"	Gian Stone	
2021	Ben Platt	Reverie	"happy to be sad"	Zach Skelton	
2021	Ben Platt	Reverie	"dance with you"	Ben Abraham, Gian Stone	
2021	Ben Platt	Reverie	"chasing you"	Gian Stone	
2021	Ben Platt	Reverie	"dark times"		
2021	Maroon 5	Jordi	"Echo" (featuring blackbear)	Cirkut	
2022	Jennifer Lopez	Marry Me (Original Motion Picture Soundtrack)	"Marry Me (Kat & Bastian Duet)" (with Maluma)	Nick Sarazen, The Monsters & Strangerz	
2022	Jonah Kagen	Non-album single	"Barcelona"	Davin Kingston	
2022	John Legend	Legend	"I Don't Love You Like I Used To"	Gian Stone, Davin Kingston, Ryan Tedder	
2023	Glaive	I Care So Much That I Don't Care at All	"Tiziana"	Jeff Hazin, The Monsters & Strangerz	
2023	Lauv	Non-album single	"Love U Like That"	Lauv, Federico Vindver	
2023	Miley Cyrus	Endless Summer Vacation	"Used To Be Young"	Miley Cyrus, Shawn Everett	
2024	Lewis Capaldi	Broken by Desire to be Heavenly Sent (Extended Edition)	"Strangers"	The Monsters & Strangerz	
2024	Beyoncé	Cowboy Carter	"II Most Wanted" (with Miley Cyrus)	Beyoncé, Miley Cyrus, Shawn Everett, Jonathan Rado	
2024	Rosé	Rosie	"Call It the End"	Griff Clawson	
2025	Daniel Seavey	Second Wind	"The Older You Get"	Daniel Seavey, Ehren Ebbage	
2025	Daniel Seavey	Second Wind	"Your Light"	Daniel Seavey, Soren Breum, Vera	
2025	Daniel Seavey	Second Wind	"Gateway Drug"	Daniel Seavey, Ryan Daley	
2025	Daniel Seavey	Second Wind	"Other People"	Daniel Seavey, The Monsters & Strangerz, Isaiah Tejada	
2025	Khalid	After the Sun Goes Down	"nobody (make me feel)" (with oskar med k)	Griff Clawson, Oskar Sjavag	
2025	Miley Cyrus	Something Beautiful	"Prelude"	Miley Cyrus, Maxx Morando, Shawn Everett, Jonathan Rado	
2025	Miley Cyrus	Something Beautiful	"Something Beautiful"	Miley Cyrus, Maxx Morando, Max Taylor-Sheppard, Jonathan Rado, Shawn Everett	
2025	Miley Cyrus	Something Beautiful	"End of the World"	Miley Cyrus, Shawn Everett, Jonathan Rado, Maxx Morando, Max Taylor-Sheppard, Molly Rankin, Alec O'Hanley	
2025	Miley Cyrus	Something Beautiful	"More to Lose"	Miley Cyrus, Shawn Everett, Jonathan Rado, BJ Burton	
2025	Miley Cyrus	Something Beautiful	"Interlude 1"	Miley Cyrus, Maxx Morando, Max Taylor-Sheppard, Jonathan Rado, Shawn Everett	
2025	Miley Cyrus	Something Beautiful	"Easy Lover"	Miley Cyrus, Jonathan Rado, Shawn Everett	
2025	Miley Cyrus	Something Beautiful	"Interlude 2"	Miley Cyrus, Maxx Morando, Jonathan Rado, Shawn Everett	
2025	Miley Cyrus	Something Beautiful	"Golden Burning Sun"	Miley Cyrus, Shawn Everett, Jonathan Rado, BJ Burton	
2025	Miley Cyrus	Something Beautiful	"Walk of Fame" (featuring Brittany Howard)	Miley Cyrus, Maxx Morando, Shawn Everett, Brittany Howard, Jonathan Rado	
2025	Miley Cyrus	Something Beautiful	"Pretend You're God"	Miley Cyrus, Maxx Morando, Jonathan Rado, Shawn Everett	
2025	Miley Cyrus	Something Beautiful	"Every Girl You've Ever Loved" (featuring Naomi Cambell)	Miley Cyrus, Jonathan Rado, Shawn Everett, Ian Gold	
2025	Miley Cyrus	Something Beautiful	"Reborn"	Miley Cyrus, Maxx Morando, Max Taylor-Sheppard, Shawn Everett, Jonathan Rado, Ethan Shevin	
2025	Miley Cyrus	Something Beautiful	"Give Me Love"	Miley Cyrus, Jonathan Rado, Shawn Everett, Kid Harpoon, Tyler Johnson	
2025	Miley Cyrus	Something Beautiful	"Secrets" (featuring Lindsey Buckingham & Mick Fleetwood)	Miley Cyrus, Jonathan Rado, Shawn Everett	
2025	Miley Cyrus	Non-album single	"Maybe It's"	Miley Cyrus, Shawn Everett, Jonathan Rado	
2026	Lewis Capaldi	Survive	"Stay Love"	The Monsters & Strangerz	
2026	Maise Peters	Florescence	"Questions"	Maise Peters, Griff Clawson	
2026	Sienna Spiro	Visitor	"Die On This Hill"	Omer Fedi, Blake Slatkin	
2026	Sienna Spiro	Visitor	"The Visitor"	Omer Fedi, Sienna Spiro	
2026	Debbii Dawson	Where Have All The Good Men Gone?	"Money"	Griff Clawson, Debbii Dawson	
2026	Miley Cyrus	Non-album single	"Younger You" (solo or featuring Lainey Wilson)	Miley Cyrus, The Monsters & Strangerz	
2026	Miley Cyrus	Bass Persuades	"Bass Persuades"	Miley Cyrus, Kid Harpoon, Maxx Morando	
2026	Miley Cyrus	Bass Persuades	"Different Religion" (featuring Model/Actriz)	Miley Cyrus, Kid Harpoon, Model/Actriz, Maxx Morando	
2026	Miley Cyrus	Bass Persuades	"Let's Get Married"	Miley Cyrus, The Monsters & Strangerz, Kid Harpoon	
2026	Miley Cyrus	Bass Persuades	"Orbit"	Miley Cyrus, The Monsters & Strangerz, Griff Clawson, Model/Actriz	
2026	Miley Cyrus	Bass Persuades	"Aftermath"	Miley Cyrus, The Monsters & Strangerz, Griff Clawson, Kid Harpoon, Maxx Morando	
2026	Miley Cyrus	Bass Persuades	"REDLIGHTS"	Miley Cyrus, Kid Harpoon, Maxx Morando, The Monsters & Strangerz	
2026	Miley Cyrus	Bass Persuades	"Neon Signs" (featuring Andrew Wyatt of Miike Snow)	Miley Cyrus, Kid Harpoon, Maxx Morando, Andrew Wyatt	
2026	Miley Cyrus	Bass Persuades	"Snow"	Miley Cyrus, Kid Harpoon, Maxx Morando, Model/Actriz	
2026	Miley Cyrus	Bass Persuades	"Smile"	Miley Cyrus, Kid Harpoon, Maxx Morando	

== Awards and nominations ==
=== Major associations ===
==== Brit Awards ====
Year	Category	Nominated Work	Result	Ref.
2023	Song of the Year	"Forget Me" (as songwriter)	Nominated	
2024	International Song of the Year	"Flowers" (as songwriter)	Won	

==== Critics' Choice Movie Awards ====
Year	Category	Nominated Work	Result	Ref.
2025	Best Song	"Kiss the Sky" (from The Wild Robot) (as songwriter)	Nominated	

==== Golden Globes ====
Year	Category	Nominated Work	Result	Ref.
2025	Best Original Song	"Kiss the Sky" (from The Wild Robot) (as songwriter)	Nominated	

==== Grammy Awards ====
Year	Category	Nominated Work	Result	Ref.
2022	Album of the Year	Justice (Triple Chucks Deluxe) (as songwriter & producer)	Nominated	
2023	Album of the Year	Special (as songwriter)	Nominated	
2023	Album of the Year	Renaissance (as songwriter)	Nominated	
2024	Album of the Year	Endless Summer Vacation (as songwriter)	Nominated	
2024	Record of the Year	"Flowers" (as engineer/mixer)	Won	
2024	Song of the Year	"Flowers" (as songwriter)	Nominated	
2024	Best American Roots Song	"Dear Insecurity" (as songwriter)	Nominated	
2026	Best Country Song	"Good News" (as songwriter)	Nominated	

=== Other awards and nominations ===
Association	Year	Category	Recipient(s) and nominee(s)	Result	Ref(s).
Americana Music Honors & Awards	2024	Song of the Year	"Dear Insecurity" (as songwriter)	Won	
Asian Pop Music Awards	2025	Best Lyricist	"Toxic Till the End"	Nominated	
Astra Creative Arts Awards	2025	Best Original Song	"Kiss the Sky" (from The Wild Robot) (as songwriter)	Nominated	
BMI Christian Awards	2024	Award Winning Songs	"Love Me Like I Am"	Won	
BMI London Awards	2024	Award Winning Songs	"Forget Me"	Won	
BMI Pop Awards	2021	Award Winning Songs	"Memories"	Won	
BMI Pop Awards	2022	Award Winning Songs	"Anyone"	Won	
BMI Pop Awards	2022	Award Winning Songs	"Daisies"	Won	
BMI Pop Awards	2022	Award Winning Songs	"Holy" (featuring Chance The Rapper)	Won	
BMI Pop Awards	2022	Award Winning Songs	"Nobody's Love"	Won	
BMI Pop Awards	2022	Songwriter of the Year	Himself	Won	
BMI Pop Awards	2023	Award Winning Songs	"Ghost"	Won	
BMI Pop Awards	2024	Award Winning Songs	"Forget Me"	Won	
BMI Pop Awards	2024	Award Winning Songs	"Flowers"	Won	
BMI Pop Awards	2024	Song of the Year	"Flowers"	Won	
BMI Pop Awards	2025	Award Winning Songs	"Used to Be Young"	Won	
Chicago Indie Critics Awards	2025	Best Original Song	"Kiss the Sky" (from The Wild Robot) (as songwriter)	Nominated	
Critics Association of Central Florida	2025	Best Original Song	"Kiss the Sky" (from The Wild Robot) (as songwriter)	Won	
Denver Film Critics Society	2025	Best Original Song	"Kiss the Sky" (from The Wild Robot) (as songwriter)	Nominated	
Georgia Film Critics Association	2025	Best Original Song	"Kiss the Sky" (from The Wild Robot) (as songwriter)	Nominated	
Guild of Music Supervisors Awards	2025	Best Song Written and/or Recorded for a Film	"Kiss the Sky" (from The Wild Robot) (as songwriter)	Nominated	
Hollywood Music in Media Awards	2022	Best Original Song in a Documentary	"My Mind & Me" (from Selena Gomez: My Mind & Me) (as songwriter)	Nominated	
Hollywood Music in Media Awards	2024	Best Original Song in an Animated Film	"Kiss the Sky" (from The Wild Robot) (as songwriter)	Won	
Houston Film Critics Society Awards	2025	Best Original Song	"Kiss the Sky" (from The Wild Robot) (as songwriter)	Won	
IHeartRadio Music Awards	2024	Songwriter of the Year	Himself	Nominated	
Iowa Film Critics Association	2025	Best Song	"Kiss the Sky" (from The Wild Robot) (as songwriter)	Won	
Las Vegas Film Critics Society	2025	Best Song	"Kiss the Sky" (from The Wild Robot) (as songwriter)	Nominated	
Music City Film Critics Association	2025	Best Original Song	"Kiss the Sky" (from The Wild Robot) (as songwriter)	Won	
New Mexico Film Critics	2025	Best Original Song	"Kiss the Sky" (from The Wild Robot) (as songwriter)	Won	
North Carolina Film Critics Association	2025	Best Original Song	"Kiss the Sky" (from The Wild Robot) (as songwriter)	Nominated	
North Dakota Film Society	2025	Best Original Song	"Kiss the Sky" (from The Wild Robot) (as songwriter)	Nominated	
Puerto Rico Critics Association	2025	Best Original Song	"Kiss the Sky" (from The Wild Robot) (as songwriter)	Won	
Satellite Awards	2025	Best Original Song	"Kiss the Sky" (from The Wild Robot) (as songwriter)	Nominated	
Variety's Hitmakers	2022	Film Song of the Year	"My Mind & Me" (from Selena Gomez: My Mind & Me) (as songwriter)	Won	
