= Selena Gomez: My Mind & Me =

2022 documentary film by Alek Keshishian

- Release poster
- Directed by: Alek Keshishian
- Written by: Alek Keshishian; Paul Marchand
- Produced by: Alek Keshishian; Michelle An; Katherine LeBlond; Aleen Keshishian; Zack Morgenroth; Caitlin Daley
- Starring: Selena Gomez
- Cinematography: David Paul Jacobson; Matthias Schubert; Hunter Simmons
- Edited by: Rodrigo Brazão; David Brodie; Danny Tull; Inaya Graciana Yusuf; Veronica Pinkham
- Production companies: Lighthouse Management + Media; Interscope Films
- Distributed by: Apple TV+
- Release dates: November 2, 2022 (AFI Fest); November 4, 2022 (Apple TV+)
- Running time: 95 minutes
- Country: United States
- Language: English

Selena Gomez: My Mind & Me is a 2022 American documentary film that follows singer and actress Selena Gomez during a six year period of her career. The film documents her struggles with physical and mental well-being in the wake of her diagnosis with lupus and bipolar disorder. It was directed by Alek Keshishian, produced by Lighthouse Management + Media and Interscope Films, and released to Apple TV+ and select theaters on November 4, 2022.

Premiering at the opening night of the AFI Fest on November 2, 2022, Selena Gomez: My Mind & Me was met with a positive critical reception; the documentary was praised for mental health transparency. Accompanying the film's release, "My Mind & Me", a song by Gomez featured in the end credits, was released as a single.

== Synopsis ==
The official synopsis as released by Apple TV+, "After years in the limelight, Selena Gomez achieves unimaginable stardom. But just as she reaches a new peak, an unexpected turn pulls her into darkness. This uniquely raw and intimate documentary spans her six-year journey into a new light."

== Cast ==
- Selena Gomez
- Raquell Stevens, Gomez' close friend of over 10 years

== Development ==
The documentary follows Gomez on a six-year journey starting from around 2015, after Keshishian directed Gomez's "Hands to Myself" music video. Keshishian said: "I had no interest in making a traditional pop doc. I wanted to show something more authentic and Selena did, too. She has a raw vulnerability that captured me ... I had no idea then that it would become a six-year labor of love."

== Release and promotion ==
Gomez announced the release of her documentary with a short clip posted to her Instagram. The film premiered at the AFI Fest on November 2, 2022, at the TCL Chinese Theatre in Hollywood, and was released two days after on Apple TV+ and in select movie theaters. The trailer for the documentary was released on October 10, which is World Mental Health Day. The trailer included the song "My Mind & Me", released on November 3, 2022; it was performed by Gomez and written by Gomez, Amy Allen, Jon Bellion, Jordan Johnson, Stefan Johnson and Michael Pollack. According to a Samba TV research panel of 3.1 million smart television households who tuned in for at least one minute, My Mind & Me drew in 78,100 viewers in its first two days.

== Reception ==
=== Critical response ===
Upon release, Selena Gomez: My Mind & Me, received positive reviews from critics. The review aggregator website Rotten Tomatoes reported a 97% approval rating based on 36 reviews. On Metacritic, the film received a weighted average score of 68 out of 100, based on 11 critics, indicating "generally favorable reviews".

Chris Azzopardi of The New York Times praised the documentary as an "honest portrait study of stardom and mental illness." He writes the film "offers a hopeful catharsis: How, when we reveal our hardest truths, we can heal together." Writing for IndieWire, David Ehrlich notes the "raw and messy" documentary is "not a movie about healing so much as a movie about learning to hurt in the healthiest way possible. And if its diaristic, inside-out approach has the strange effect of keeping us at a distance, it also invites its most vulnerable young viewers to appreciate that even their favorite superstar is still fighting to be closer to herself." Lovia Gyarkye of The Hollywood Reporter writes "Unlike other music documentaries (a popular format, as of late, for recalibrating celebrity images), Gomez' project operates at a rawer, grittier register. It's textured by the 30-year-old star's relative youth and her attempts to communicate honestly, instead of perfectly." Variety's Chris Willman wrote: "It's far from the first music doc to reveal that it can be lonely at the top, but it is among the few to convey that there are no easy answers for that when mental illness is at the root. Of all the portrayals of pop superstars that have been produced in-house in recent years, 'My Mind & Me' is probably the one with the least celebratory third act… which is something to celebrate."

=== Accolades ===
Award	Date of ceremony	Category	Recipient(s)	Result	Ref.
Astra Creative Arts TV Awards	January 8, 2024	Best Streaming Documentary Movie	Selena Gomez: My Mind & Me	Nominated	
Cinema for Peace Awards	February 24, 2023	Global Health	Alek Keshishian	Nominated	
Critics Choice Association	November 16, 2022	Seal of Female Empowerment in Entertainment	Selena Gomez: My Mind & Me	Won	
Golden Reel Awards	February 26, 2023	Outstanding Achievement in Sound Editing – Non-Theatrical Documentary	Anthony Vanchure, Mike James Gallagher, Matt Olivo, Jeff Pitts, Luke Kelley, Sanaa Kelley	Nominated	
Hollywood Critics Association Film Awards	February 24, 2023	Best Documentary Film	Selena Gomez: My Mind & Me	Nominated	
Hollywood Music in Media Awards	November 16, 2022	Song - Documentary Film	Selena Gomez, Amy Allen, Jon Bellion, Jordan Johnson, Stefan Johnson and Michael Pollack ("My Mind & Me")	Nominated	
Hollywood Music in Media Awards	November 16, 2022	Music Documentary/Special Program	Alek Keshishian, Michelle An and Katherine LeBlond	Nominated	
iHeartRadio Music Awards	March 27, 2023	Favorite Documentary	Selena Gomez: My Mind & Me	Won	
MTV Movie & TV Awards	May 7, 2023	Best Music Documentary	Selena Gomez: My Mind & Me	Won	
Primetime Creative Arts Emmy Awards	January 6–7, 2024	Outstanding Writing for a Nonfiction Programming	Alek Keshishian, Paul Marchand	Nominated	
Variety Hitmakers Awards	December 3, 2022	Film Song of the Year	Selena Gomez ("My Mind & Me")	Won	
Webby Awards	May 15, 2023	Trailer, General Video (Video)	Selena Gomez: My Mind & Me: Diary	Won (Note: People's Voice winner)	

== See also ==
- List of Apple TV+ original films
