= Not 20 Anymore =

2019 song by Bebe Rexha

Promotional single by Bebe Rexha
- Released: August 30, 2019
- Length: 3:03
- Label: Warner
- Songwriters: Bleta Rexha; Jordan K. Johnson; Michael Pollack; Oliver Peterhof; Stefan Johnson
- Producers: German; Monsters and Strangerz

Music video
- "Not 20 Anymore" on YouTube

"Not 20 Anymore" is a song by American singer-songwriter Bebe Rexha. It was released on August 30, 2019, her thirtieth birthday, through Warner as a promotional single. The song was written by Rexha, Jordan K. Johnson, Michael Pollack, Oliver Peterhof and Stefan Johnson, and produced by German and the Monsters and the Strangerz.

== Background ==
On August 12, 2019, Rexha confirmed the song's title and release date. On August 23, she revealed the song's cover artwork. On August 28, Rexha announced that the song's music video would be released with the song on August 30.

== Composition ==
"Not 20 Anymore" is a "jazzy, slow-burn" ballad about body acceptance and self love. Mike Wass, writing for Idolator, wrote that the song "takes a powerful stance against ageism". During the hook, Rexha sings "No, I'm not 20 anymore (20 anymore)/ Don't try to make me feel insecure/ 'Cause I’m aging like wine I get better with time, yes, I do (Yes, I do)". It was written by Rexha, Jordan K. Johnson, Michael Pollack, Oliver Peterhof and Stefan Johnson, and produced by German and the Monsters and the Strangerz.

== Music video ==
The music video for "Not 20 Anymore" was released with the song on August 30, 2019. As of August 2026, the music video has received over 13 million views on YouTube. The video also features a series of 20 year-old men and women giving their own testimonials about what it feels like to be that age, including the fears, insecurities and worries about the future that come with youth.

== Charts ==
Chart (2019)	Peak position
New Zealand Hot Singles (RMNZ)	38
US Digital Song Sales (Billboard)	38

== Release history ==
Country	Date	Format	Label	Ref.
Various	August 30, 2019	Digital download; streaming	Warner	
