= Chasing Stars =

2021 single by Alesso, Marshmello and James Bay

Single by Alesso and Marshmello featuring James Bay
- Released: 20 August 2021
- Genre: Pop; Future trap
- Length: 2:50
- Label: Joytime Collective; 10:22 pm
- Songwriters: Michael Pollack; Alessandro Lindblad; Alexander Izquierdo; Joshua K.B; James Michael Bay; Jonathan Bellion; Jordan K. Johnson; Marshmello; Stefan Johnson
- Producers: Alesso; Marshmello; The Monsters & Strangerz

Alesso singles chronology
"Going Dumb" (2021)	"Chasing Stars" (2021)	"When I'm Gone" (2021)

Marshmello singles chronology
"House Party" (2021)	"Chasing Stars" (2021)	"Preached" (2021)

James Bay singles chronology
"Funeral" (2021)	"Chasing Stars" (2021)	"Give Me the Reason" (2022)

Music video
- "Chasing Stars" on YouTube

"Chasing Stars" is a song by Swedish DJ and record producer Alesso and American DJ and record producer Marshmello featuring English singer James Bay. It was released on 20 August 2021 via Joytime Collective and 10:22 pm/Astralwerks.

== Background ==
Bay accepted an interview of People.com, and said: "It's reminiscent of a time that you had with somebody, then it's talking about how beautiful it was and what a wonderful time that was. [...] It was you and me against the world.' I hope it does that for people, that's what it does for me."

== Music video ==
The music video was directed by Jake Jelicich, who also filmed music videos for Dua Lipa and Niall Horan. The video was featured as a video store, Bay worked the counter, then he browsed a few VHS tapes, subsequently he became mesmerized by "the deeply intimate, home-movie-like scenes and the beguiling woman who appears in each tape".

== Credits and personnel ==
Credits adapted from Tidal.

- Alesso – producer, composer, lyricist,
- Marshmello – producer, composer, lyricist, associated performer, programming
- The Monsters & Strangerz – producer, composer, lyricist, associated performer, vocal producer
- Alexander Izquierdo – composer, lyricist
- James Bay – composer, lyricist, associated performer, featured artist, vocalist
- Jonathan Bellion – composer, lyricist
- Michael Pollack – composer, lyricist
- Jeremie Inhaber – assistant mixer, studio personnel
- Emerson Mancini – mastering engineer, studio personnel
- Chris Galland – mix engineer, studio personnel
- Manny Marroquin – mixer, studio personnel
- Henri Davies – recording engineer, studio personnel

== Charts ==
=== Weekly charts ===
Weekly chart performance for "Chasing Stars"
Chart (2021)	Peak position
Belgium (Ultratop 50 Flanders)	40
Canada Hot AC (Billboard)	47
Ireland (IRMA)	93
New Zealand Hot Singles (RMNZ)	15
New Zealand Hot Singles (RMNZ) VIP mix	38
Sweden (Sverigetopplistan)	74
US Adult Pop Airplay (Billboard)	24
US Hot Dance/Electronic Songs (Billboard)	10
US Pop Airplay (Billboard)	30

=== Year-end charts ===
2021 year-end chart performance for "Chasing Stars"
Chart (2021)	Position
US Hot Dance/Electronic Songs (Billboard)	32

2022 year-end chart performance for "Chasing Stars"
Chart (2022)	Position
US Hot Dance/Electronic Songs (Billboard)	70

== Release history ==
Release history for "Chasing Stars"
Region	Date	Format	Label	Ref.
Various	20 August 2021	Digital download; streaming	Joytime Collective; 10:22 pm	
United States	23 August 2021	Adult contemporary radio	Astralwerks; Capitol	
United States	24 August 2021	Contemporary hit radio	Astralwerks; Capitol	
Italy	27 August 2021	Contemporary hit radio	Universal	
