= Single Soon =

Single by Selena Gomez
- Released: August 25, 2023
- Genre: Dance-pop; synthwave
- Length: 2:51
- Label: Interscope
- Songwriters: Selena Gomez; Ammar Malik; JKash; Lisa Scinta; Phil Shaouy; Ross Golan; Benny Blanco; Cashmere Cat
- Producers: Benny Blanco; Cashmere Cat

Selena Gomez singles chronology
"My Mind & Me" (2022)	"Single Soon" (2023)	"Love On" (2024)

Music video
- "Single Soon" on YouTube

"Single Soon" is a song by American singer Selena Gomez. It was released as a standalone single on August 25, 2023, through Interscope Records. The track was produced by Benny Blanco and Cashmere Cat. Musically, it is a synthwave-driven dance-pop song. The song debuted within the top-twenty on many official world charts including the Canadian Hot 100, the U.S. Billboard Hot 100, and the Billboard Global 200. In 2024, it won a ASCAP pop music award.

== Background ==
In February 2023, Gomez first spoke about her upcoming musical output, telling Vanity Fair, that it was "about real things that I'm walking through" and described it as "really powerful, strong, very pop" and "freedom from relationships, freedom from the darkness". She further confirmed working on new music in May 2023. On August 13, 2023, fans spotted posters with the question "Single Soon?" with a phone number attached to them. When dialing the number, a voicemail greeting can be heard to "never worry about boyfriends at all". The posters also pointed to a website called "illbesinglesoon.com" with the bottom of the page displaying links to Gomez's social media and newsletter.

On August 17, after numerous fan speculations, Gomez eventually announced the single on her social media and revealed its cover art, which features her "posing in the backseat of a car with a glamorous fur jacket". Limited edition 7-inch vinyls of the song were made available to preorder, along with its pre-save on streaming platforms. In an accompanying statement, she stated that "Single Soon" is just "a fun little song I wrote a while back that’s perfect for the end of summer" and that she is not "quite done with" her upcoming fourth studio album. It is a dance-pop and synthwave song about enjoying being single after breaking up with a partner.

On September 14, 2023, the song was removed from streaming platforms and digital stores temporarily, before returning to its uploaded state after a few hours.

== Music video ==
To open the music video, Gomez receives a voice message from her younger sister confirming everything she needs to know: "Love you, Sissy. Never worry about guys—at all." Gomez then writes a note to her soon-to-be ex, saying "I'm sorry, I can't, don't hate me." In the "Single Soon" music video, Gomez emphasizes that she will not dwell on any ex-beau for another minute. Gomez changes and puts on a variety of luxury and glamorous clothes.

== Charts ==
=== Weekly charts ===
Chart performance for "Single Soon"
Chart (2023–2024)	Peak position
Australia (ARIA)	26
Austria (Ö3 Austria Top 40)	52
Belgium (Ultratop 50 Flanders)	42
Belgium (Ultratop 50 Wallonia)	45
Bulgaria Airplay (PROPHON)	4
Canada Hot 100 (Billboard)	17
Canada CHR/Top 40 (Billboard)	6
Canada Hot AC (Billboard)	15
CIS Airplay (TopHit)	47
Croatia International Airplay (Top lista)	23
Czech Republic Airplay (ČNS IFPI)	5
Czech Republic Singles Digital (ČNS IFPI)	74
El Salvador Airplay (Monitor Latino)	18
Estonia Airplay (TopHit)	1
France (SNEP)	66
Germany (GfK)	68
Global 200 (Billboard)	13
Global Excl. US (Billboard)	17
Greece International (IFPI)	74
Hungary (Rádiós Top 40)	5
Iceland (Tónlistinn)	39
Ireland (IRMA)	19
Japan Hot Overseas (Billboard Japan)	9
Latvia Airplay (LAIPA)	6
Lithuania (AGATA)	52
Lithuania Airplay (TopHit)	29
Netherlands (Single Top 100)	64
Netherlands (Tipparade)	4
New Zealand (Recorded Music NZ)	35
Norway (VG-lista)	16
Panama Airplay (Monitor Latino)	9
Paraguay Airplay (Monitor Latino)	9
Poland (Polish Airplay Top 100)	5
Poland (Polish Streaming Top 100)	56
Portugal (AFP)	58
Russia Airplay (TopHit)	98
San Marino Airplay (SMRTV Top 50)	4
Slovakia Airplay (ČNS IFPI)	4
Slovakia Singles Digital (ČNS IFPI)	46
Spain Airplay (TopHit)	35
South Korea BGM (Circle)	115
South Korea Download (Circle)	169
Sweden (Sverigetopplistan)	43
Switzerland (Schweizer Hitparade)	47
UK Singles (Official Charts)	21
US Billboard Hot 100	19
US Adult Contemporary (Billboard)	16
US Adult Pop Airplay (Billboard)	9
US Dance Airplay (Billboard)	27
US Pop Airplay (Billboard)	10

=== Monthly charts ===
Monthly chart performance for "Single Soon"
Chart (2023)	Peak position
CIS Airplay (TopHit)	49
Estonia Airplay (TopHit)	1
Lithuania Airplay (TopHit)	33
Paraguay (SGP)	26

=== Year-end charts ===
2023 year-end chart performance for "Single Soon"
Chart (2023)	Position
Estonia Airplay (TopHit)	27
Lithuania Airplay (TopHit)	186
Poland (Polish Airplay Top 100)	71

2024 year-end chart performance for "Single Soon"
Chart (2024)	Position
Hungary (Rádiós Top 40)	51

2025 year-end chart performance for "Single Soon"
Chart (2025)	Position
Hungary (Rádiós Top 40)	46

== Certifications ==
Certifications for "Single Soon"
Region	Certification	Certified units/sales
Australia (ARIA)	Platinum	70,000^{‡}
Brazil (Pro-Música Brasil)	Platinum	40,000^{‡}
Canada (Music Canada)	Gold	40,000^{‡}
Italy (FIMI)	Gold	50,000^{‡}
Poland (ZPAV)	Gold	25,000^{‡}
^{‡} Sales+streaming figures based on certification alone.

== Release history ==
Release dates and formats for "Single Soon"
Region	Date	Format(s)	Label	Ref.
Italy	August 25, 2023	Radio airplay	Universal	
Various	August 25, 2023	Digital download; streaming	Interscope	
Various	January 3, 2024	7-inch	Interscope	
