= My Mind & Me =

2022 single by Selena Gomez

Single by Selena Gomez
- Released: November 3, 2022
- Length: 2:27
- Label: Interscope
- Songwriters: Selena Gomez; Amy Allen; Jonathan Bellion; Michael Pollack; Stefan Johnson; Jordan K. Johnson
- Producer: The Monsters & Strangerz

Selena Gomez singles chronology
"Calm Down" (Remix) (2022)	"My Mind & Me" (2022)	"Single Soon" (2023)

Music video
- "My Mind & Me" (Film Version) on YouTube

"My Mind & Me" is a song recorded by American singer Selena Gomez. It was released on November 3, 2022, by Interscope Records, as a single for Selena Gomez: My Mind & Me, a 2022 documentary film. The song was shortlisted for the Best Original Song category at the 95th Academy Awards.

== Composition ==
The song was written by Selena Gomez, Amy Allen, Jonathan Bellion, Michael Pollack, Stefan and Jordan K. Johnson, with the production of the team The Monsters & Strangerz. The song was written and recorded in four days in a house in Palm Springs, California.

In an interview with Variety, Amy Allen explained that the song captures "the overarching concept of feeling at odds with your own mind, the song just kind of wrote itself. It felt like a dream session because it’s so rare for a song to come out so naturally." Gomez also told that recording the song was "therapeutic" and "cathartic" for her, and that she wanted to get the message that "if somebody sees me like this, then they won’t feel alone now".

== Critical reception ==
Jon Pareles wrote in a review for The New York Times that the music moved from "fragility to determination" and from "lone, echoey piano notes" to a "supportive march and a mission statement".

== Accolades ==
Awards and nominations for "My Mind & Me"
Year	Organization	Award	Result	Ref(s)
2022	Hollywood Music in Media Awards	Song - Documentary Film	Nominated	
2022	Variety Hitmakers	Film Song of the Year	Won	
2023	Academy Awards	Best Original Song	Shortlisted	

== Charts ==
Chart performance for "My Mind & Me"
Chart (2022–2023)	Peak position
Australia (ARIA)	98
Canada Hot 100 (Billboard)	63
Canada CHR/Top 40 (Billboard)	27
Global 200 (Billboard)	80
Global Excl. US (Billboard)	90
Greece International (IFPI)	81
Hungary (Single Top 40)	18
Ireland (IRMA)	50
Japan Hot Overseas (Billboard Japan)	19
Lithuania Airplay (TopHit)	66
New Zealand Hot Singles (RMNZ)	13
Portugal (AFP)	108
South Korea BGM (Circle)	156
South Korea Download (Circle)	190
Sweden (Sverigetopplistan)	76
Switzerland (Schweizer Hitparade)	61
UK Singles (OCC)	78
US Billboard Hot 100	83
US Adult Pop Airplay (Billboard)	37
US Pop Airplay (Billboard)	22

== Release history ==
Release dates and formats for "My Mind & Me"
Region	Date	Format	Label	Ref.
Various	November 3, 2022	Digital download; streaming	Interscope	
United States	November 8, 2022	Contemporary hit radio	Interscope	
Italy	November 18, 2022	Radio airplay	Universal	
