= Love On =

Single by Selena Gomez
- Released: February 22, 2024
- Genre: Pop; disco
- Length: 3:01
- Label: Interscope
- Composers: Isaiah Tejada; Jordan K. Johnson; Michael Pollack; Stefan Johnson
- Lyricists: Selena Gomez; Julia Michaels
- Producers: The Monsters & Strangerz; Isaiah Tejada

Selena Gomez singles chronology
"Single Soon" (2023)	"Love On" (2024)	"Call Me When You Break Up" (2025)

Music video
- "Love On" on YouTube

"Love On" is a song by American singer Selena Gomez. It was released as a standalone single on February 22, 2024, through Interscope Records. The track was produced by The Monsters & Strangerz and Isaiah Tejada, and was written by Gomez alongside longtime collaborator Julia Michaels.

Commercially, the song charted in numerous territories, reaching number 56 in both Canada and on the US Billboard Hot 100.

== Background and release ==
On February 14, Gomez posted a link to a heart-shaped lock with a passcode "222", alluding to the release date of the single. She announced "Love On" the following day through her social media. The song was released on February 22, 2024, alongside a music video.

Following the release of the single, Gomez revealed to Rolling Stone that the song "might not be really reflective of the project that I’m working on".

== Charts ==
=== Weekly charts ===
Chart performance for "Love On"
Chart (2024–2025)	Peak position
Australia (ARIA)	83
Belarus Airplay (TopHit)	29
Canada Hot 100 (Billboard)	56
Canada CHR/Top 40 (Billboard)	22
Canada Hot AC (Billboard)	26
CIS Airplay (TopHit)	47
Croatia International Airplay (Top lista)	25
Estonia Airplay (TopHit)	14
Global 200 (Billboard)	67
Greece International (IFPI)	82
Ireland (IRMA)	73
Japan Hot Overseas (Billboard Japan)	9
Kazakhstan Airplay (TopHit)	168
Latvia Airplay (TopHit)	172
Lithuania Airplay (TopHit)	2
New Zealand Hot Singles (RMNZ)	7
Nigeria (TurnTable Top 100)	58
Panama (Monitor Latino)	13
Poland (Polish Airplay Top 100)	21
Portugal (AFP)	182
Russia Airplay (TopHit)	64
San Marino (SMRRTV Top 50)	12
Slovakia Airplay (ČNS IFPI)	17
Spain Airplay (TopHit)	36
South Korea BGM (Circle)	136
South Korea Download (Circle)	191
Sweden (Sverigetopplistan)	85
UK Singles (Official Charts)	61
US Billboard Hot 100	56
US Adult Pop Airplay (Billboard)	14
US Dance Airplay (Billboard)	33
US Pop Airplay (Billboard)	17
Venezuela Airplay (Record Report)	68

=== Monthly charts ===
Monthly chart performance for "Love On"
Chart (2024)	Peak position
Russia Airplay (TopHit)	85

=== Year-end charts ===
2024 year-end chart performance for "Love On"
Chart (2024)	Position
Estonia Airplay (TopHit)	108
Lithuania Airplay (TopHit)	17

2025 year-end chart performance for "Love On"
Chart (2025)	Position
Lithuania Airplay (TopHit)	138

== Certifications ==
Certifications for "Love On"
Region	Certification	Certified units/sales
Brazil (Pro-Música Brasil)	Platinum	40,000^{‡}
^{‡} Sales+streaming figures based on certification alone.

== Release history ==
Release dates and formats for "Love On"
Region	Date	Format	Label	Ref.
Various	February 22, 2024	Digital download; streaming	Interscope	
Italy	February 22, 2024	Radio airplay	Universal	
