= Love Like This (Zayn song) =

2023 single by Zayn

Single by Zayn
- Released: 21 July 2023
- Genre: Pop; drum and bass; UK garage
- Length: 2:53
- Label: Mercury; Republic
- Songwriters: Zayn Malik; Jonathan Bellion; Jordan K. Johnson; Stefan Johnson; Michael Pollack
- Producers: Bellion; The Monsters & Strangerz

Zayn singles chronology
| "Angel" (2022) | "Love Like This" (2023) | "Tu Hai Kahan" (2024) |

Music video
- "Love Like This" on YouTube

"Love Like This" is a song by English singer-songwriter Zayn. It was released as a single on 21 July 2023 through Mercury and Republic Records and serves as his first release under the labels. Zayn wrote the song with producers Jon Bellion and the Monsters & Strangerz (Jordan K. Johnson and Stefan Johnson), alongside Michael Pollack. The song serves as his first solo release in over two years although he had later released three collaborations with other artists. A remix of the song by Mura Masa was released on 8 September 2023.

== Background and promotion ==
On 26 June 2023, Billboard confirmed that Zayn had recently signed to Mercury Records, in which label heads confirmed that he would be releasing his first single under the label "very soon this summer", which he teased by wiping all the posts on his Instagram account, while inside sources close to him also said that he would be experimenting with a new sound with the music that he had been making around the same time. The following day, Zayn teased a clip of what appeared to be a music video shoot for an upcoming song on social media, which showed him wearing a helmet while getting ready to ride a motorcycle, along with a pre-save link for his new music. Two days later, he teased another clip that played a part of the instrumental of the song, as his vocals were quiet and faded towards the end. On 3 July 2023, Zayn shared an actual snippet of the song with his vocals as part of another clip of the video. Exactly a week later, he revealed the title of the song and release date as he shared a video of him spray painting "LOVE LIKE THIS 7.21" on a wall. On 12 July 2023, Zayn was interviewed on the podcast Call Her Daddy by Alex Cooper, in which he described the song as "a summer jam" and furtherly felt that "it's a good vibe, it just feels like summer". Two days later, Zayn shared the cover art of the song. Leading up to the release of the song, he shared snippets and different clips of the video multiple times.

== Composition and lyrics ==
"Love Like This" is a pop, drum and bass, and UK garage song. Over a house-inspired instrumental, Zayn sings about a new romantic relationship that he is in and wants it to stay that way despite the risks that may come with it.

== Music video ==
The official music video for "Love Like This", directed by Ivanna and Frank Borin, was released alongside the song on 21 July 2023. The video was shot in New York and sees Zayn wearing a red and black motorcycle jacket as he is in the company of his love interest, played by Grace Dumdaw, as they kiss and spend time with each other.

== Critical reception ==
Writing for The Daily Beast, Kyndall Cunningham described "Love Like This" as "a sleek, two-step club track that could very well be a late contender for Song of the Summer", and that Zayn "seems to have settled on a breezy, UK garage sound for his next venture—something for the girls to get ready and party to, as Saweetie would say."

== Charts ==
Chart performance for "Love Like This"
| Chart (2023–2024) | Peak position |
|---|---|
| Canada Hot 100 (Billboard) | 71 |
| Croatia (HRT) | 35 |
| Czech Republic Airplay (ČNS IFPI) | 18 |
| Global 200 (Billboard) | 117 |
| Ireland (IRMA) | 57 |
| Japan Hot Overseas (Billboard Japan) | 10 |
| Lebanon (Lebanese Top 20) | 15 |
| Lithuania Airplay (TopHit) | 64 |
| Netherlands (Single Tip) | 19 |
| New Zealand Hot Singles (RMNZ) | 10 |
| Norway (VG-lista) | 32 |
| Slovakia Airplay (ČNS IFPI) | 43 |
| Suriname (Nationale Top 40) | 15 |
| Sweden (Sverigetopplistan) | 59 |
| UK Singles (OCC) | 36 |
| UK Asia Music (OCC) | 1 |
| US Bubbling Under Hot 100 (Billboard) | 12 |
| US Pop Airplay (Billboard) | 32 |

== Release history ==
"Love Like This" release history
| Region | Date | Format(s) | Version(s) | Label(s) | Ref. |
|---|---|---|---|---|---|
| Various | 21 July 2023 | Digital download; streaming | Original | Mercury; Republic | |
| Italy | 21 July 2023 | Radio airplay | Original | Universal | |
| Various | 8 September 2023 | Digital download; streaming | Mura Masa remix | Mercury; Republic | |
