= Wes Period =

American artist, rapper, and producer

Wes Period is an American artist, rapper, and producer from La Habra, California. He began his career in a band called "Close But Not Quite" and "Goldenwest." He then later began working with artists such as Ye Ali and Tommy Genesis. In 2017, Period was discovered by songwriter Justin Tranter via an Instagram Stories post. He is currently signed to Interscope Records.

== Career ==
Period released his debut EP Friendly Fire in 2011, it was followed up with another EP, Photosynthesis, in 2015. That same year, Period was handpicked to open for rapper Vic Mensa during one of his shows during Converse Rubber Tracks Live. In 2016 Period teamed up with Ye Ali and Tommy Genesis for a side project, baby.daddi, in which they released a 4-track EP.

Period was signed to Justin Tranter's record label, Facet Records, in partnership with Interscope Records, in 2017, where he released the singles "Trap Star" and "Big Bag" in 2017, followed by his album Pretty Words on February 16, 2018. "Big Bag" was chosen as the theme song to the Facebook reality show series Ball in the Family by Big Baller Brand.

== Discography ==
=== Albums ===
Title	Year
Late Bloomer	2017
Pretty Words	2018
How to Survive a Riot	2020

=== EPs ===
Title	Year
Friendly Fire	2011
Photosynthesis	2015

=== Singles ===
Title	Year
"Champagne Champion"	2015
"Trap Star"	2017
"Big Bag"	2017
