= Debbii Dawson =

American singer

- Born: Deborah Dawson; 1995 or 1996 (age 29–30); Hutchinson, Minnesota, U.S.
- Genres: Pop; folk; country
- Occupations: Singer; songwriter; producer
- Instruments: Vocals, guitar, keyboard, keytar
- Years active: 2022–present
- Label: RCA
- Website: debbiidawson.com

Deborah Dawson, known by her stage name Debbii Dawson, is an American singer, songwriter, and producer. Known for her blend of pop, folk, and country music, she appeared on America's Got Talent in 2022 and signed with RCA Records in 2024.

== Early life ==
Dawson was born in 1995 or 1996 and raised in Hutchinson, Minnesota. Her parents were touring instrumentalists, and she learned to play keyboard instruments from her father. She was home schooled from 4th to 7th grade, and was placed in English as a Second Language classes upon returning to public school. She joined the school choir as a teenager. She graduated from Hutchinson High School in 2011.

== Career ==
In 2022, Dawson appeared on season 17 of America's Got Talent, where she performed a cover of ABBA's "Dancing Queen". She was eliminated in the public vote for the 55th act. In July 2023, she released her debut EP, Learning. She signed a publishing deal with Warner Chappell Music and Unsub Publishing in March 2024. In April 2024, Dawson signed with RCA Records and released her first single with the label, "Happy World". She supported Orville Peck's 2024 North American Stampede Tour. She released her second EP, How to Be Human, in June 2024. She featured on Peck's August 2024 album Stampede, on the song "Back At Your Door". She released her third EP, Where Have All The Good Men Gone?, on June 26, 2026.

== Musical style ==
Dawson has cited artists including Johnny Cash, Patsy Cline, ABBA, and Queen as influences on her music.

== Discography ==
=== Extended plays ===
List of extended plays, with selected details
Title	Details
Learning	Released: July 21, 2023; Label: Self-released; Format: Digital download, streaming
How to Be Human	Released: June 28, 2024; Label: RCA; Format: Digital download, streaming
Where Have All The Good Men Gone?	Released: June 26, 2026; Label: RCA; Format: Digital download, streaming
