= The Monsters & Strangerz =

American production and songwriting team

- Origin: Miami, Florida, U.S.
- Occupations: Record producers; songwriters
- Years active: 2010–present
- Members: Stefan Johnson; Jordan Johnson

The Monsters & Strangerz are an American production and songwriting team from Miami, Florida. The team features Stefan Johnson and Jordan K. Johnson .

In 2011, The Monsters & Strangerz moved their operation to Los Angeles and have produced and written for artists including Justin Bieber, Maroon 5, Dua Lipa, Chris Brown, Halsey, Zedd, Miley Cyrus, Selena Gomez, Lizzo, Jelly Roll, Jonas Brothers, Rihanna, Teddy Swims, Katy Perry, Jennifer Lopez, Kanye West, Bebe Rexha, and many others.

== History ==
The Monsters originated as a team in 2008, when Stefan Johnson began to engineer for Miami artist and songwriter Alexander "Eskeerdo" Izquierdo. At the time Johnson was an in-demand engineer working with major artists like Rick Ross, Pitbull, and Diddy. Shortly after meeting Eskeerdo and Johnson along with his brother and producer Jordan Johnson formed The Monsters.

The Strangerz met through a mutual friend in high school in early 2005. Marcus "MarcLo" Lomax is the son of a pastor and a multi-instrumentalist; he began his musical career in his father's church band. Clarence Coffee Jr. is the son of a gospel singer; he grew up perfecting his vocals and melodies after being inspired by his family's passion for music.

The Monsters & Strangerz were introduced to each other in late 2010.

The group frequently collaborates on songwriting and production with American singer-songwriter, rapper and producer Jon Bellion, who they started working with in 2018. German, real name Oliver Peterhof, is a member of the team as music producer.

== Production discography ==
These tracks are produced credited under The Monsters & Strangerz.

Title	Year	Artist(s)	Album	Member(s)
"Big Nut Bust"	2010	Big Sean	Finally Famous Vol. 3: Big	Production only
"Never Been Hurt"	2013	Demi Lovato	Demi	J. Johnson; S. Johnson; Lomax
"Forget Forever"	2013	Selena Gomez	Stars Dance	Coffee Jr.; Izquierdo; J. Johnson; S. Johnson; Lomax
"Butterflies"	2013	Zendaya	Zendaya	J. Johnson; S. Johnson; Lomax
"Heaven Lost an Angel"	2013	Zendaya	Zendaya	Coffee Jr.; J. Johnson; S. Johnson; Lomax
"Only When You're Close"	2013	Zendaya	Zendaya	Coffee Jr.; J. Johnson; S. Johnson; Lomax
"Leave My Heart Out of This"	2013	Fifth Harmony	Better Together	J. Johnson; S. Johnson; Lomax
"One Wish"	2013	Fifth Harmony	Better Together	Coffee Jr.; J. Johnson; S. Johnson; Lomax
"On My Way"	2014	Lea Michele	Louder	Coffee Jr.; J. Johnson; S. Johnson; Lomax
"Sexercise"	2014	Kylie Minogue	Kiss Me Once	Coffee Jr.; J. Johnson; S. Johnson; Lomax
"Champagne"	2014	Ferras	Ferras	Production only
"It Was Always You"	2014	Maroon 5	V	J. Johnson; S. Johnson; Lomax
"Coming Back for You"	2014	Maroon 5	V	J. Johnson; S. Johnson; Lomax
"Already Gone"	2014	Boyz II Men	Collide	Coffee Jr.; J. Johnson; S. Johnson; Lomax
"Contigo Quiero Estar"	2014	Thalía	Amore Mio	Coffee Jr.; J. Johnson; S. Johnson; Lomax
"Fun" (featuring Chris Brown)	2015	Pitbull	Globalization	Coffee Jr.; Izquierdo; J. Johnson; S. Johnson; Lomax
"Do What You Like"	2015	Taio Cruz	Non-album single	S. Johnson; Lomax
"Pray"	2015	Bebe Rexha	I Don't Wanna Grow Up	Izquierdo; J. Johnson; S. Johnson; Lomax
"I Can't Stop Drinking About You"	2015	Bebe Rexha	I Don't Wanna Grow Up	J. Johnson; S. Johnson; Lomax
"Cheyenne"	2015	Jason Derulo	Everything Is 4	S. Johnson; Lomax
"Levels"	2015	Nick Jonas	Nick Jonas X2	J. Johnson; S. Johnson; Lomax
"Lipstick" (featuring Tyga)	2015	Isac Elliott	Faith	J. Johnson; S. Johnson; Lomax
"Dirty Work"	2015	Austin Mahone	Dirty Work – The Album	Izquierdo; J. Johnson; S. Johnson; Lomax
"Body on Me" (featuring Chris Brown)	2015	Rita Ora	Non-album single	J. Johnson; S. Johnson; Lomax
"El mismo sol" (featuring Jennifer Lopez)	2015	Alvaro Soler	Eterno Agosto	Production only
"Hey Everybody!"	2015	5 Seconds of Summer	Sounds Good Feels Good	Coffee Jr.; J. Johnson; S. Johnson; Lomax
"Castaway"	2015	5 Seconds of Summer	Sounds Good Feels Good	Coffee Jr.; J. Johnson; S. Johnson; Lomax
"Heart Drop"	2015	Inna	Inna	Coffee Jr.; J. Johnson; S. Johnson; Lomax
"Fine by Me"	2015	Chris Brown	Royalty	Production only
"If It Ain't Love"	2016	Jason Derulo	Non-album single	J. Johnson; S. Johnson; Lomax
"Thank You" (featuring R. City)	2016	Meghan Trainor	Thank You	J. Johnson; S. Johnson; Lomax
"Great Escape"	2016	Tini	Tini	J. Johnson; S. Johnson; Lomax
"Love Make the World Go Round"	2016	Jennifer Lopez and Lin-Manuel Miranda	Non-album single	J. Johnson; S. Johnson; Lomax
"I Lied"	2016	Fifth Harmony	7/27	Izquierdo; J. Johnson; S. Johnson; Lomax
"Voicemail"	2016	Fifth Harmony	7/27	J. Johnson; S. Johnson; Lomax
"Someday" (featuring Meghan Trainor)	2016	Michael Bublé	Nobody but Me	Production only
"I Would Like"	2016	Zara Larsson	So Good	Izquierdo; J. Johnson; S. Johnson; Lomax
"Educate Ya" (featuring Jason Derulo)	2017	Pitbull	Climate Change	J. Johnson; S. Johnson; Lomax
"I'm a Lady"	2017	Meghan Trainor	Non-album single	Production only
"Pretend You're Missing Me"	2017	Betty Who	The Valley	J. Johnson; S. Johnson; Lomax
"Remember I Told You" (featuring Anne-Marie and Mike Posner)	2017	Nick Jonas	Non-album single	J. Johnson; S. Johnson; Lomax
"Never Let Me Let You Go"	2017	Shawn Hook	My Side of Your Story	J. Johnson; S. Johnson; Lomax
"Lonely Night"	2017	Fifth Harmony	Fifth Harmony	J. Johnson; S. Johnson; Lomax
"Lay Your Head On Me"	2017	Juanes	Ferdinand	Izquierdo; J. Johnson; S. Johnson; Lomax
"The Middle"	2018	Zedd, Maren Morris, and Grey	Non-album single	J. Johnson; S. Johnson; Lomax
"HeartLess"	2018	Madison Beer	As She Pleases	J. Johnson; S. Johnson; Lomax
"Better Man"	2018	5 Seconds of Summer	Youngblood	J. Johnson; S. Johnson; Lomax
"Sad"	2018	Bebe Rexha	Expectations	J. Johnson; S. Johnson; Lomax
"So Real (Warriors)" (featuring Jess Glynne)	2018	Too Many Zooz vs. KDA	Non-album single	J. Johnson; S. Johnson; Lomax
"8 Letters"	2018	Why Don't We	8 Letters	J. Johnson; S. Johnson; Lomax
"Back Together"	2018	Loote	Non-album single	J. Johnson; S. Johnson; Lomax
"Ruin My Life"	2018	Zara Larsson	Poster Girl	J. Johnson; S. Johnson
"We're Not Friends"	2018	Jacob Sartorius	Better with You	Izquierdo; J. Johnson; S. Johnson; Lomax
"Mona Lisa"	2018	Sabrina Carpenter	Singular: Act I	J. Johnson; S. Johnson; Lomax
"Do With It"	2019	Betty Who	Betty	S. Johnson; Lomax
"Ugly"	2019	Anitta	UglyDolls	J. Johnson; S. Johnson
"Nostalgic"	2019	A R I Z O N A	Asylum	J. Johnson; S. Johnson
"Hate Me"	2019	Ellie Goulding and Juice Wrld	Non-album single	J. Johnson; S. Johnson; Lomax
"Hurt for Long"	2019	In Real Life	She Do	Izquierdo; J. Johnson; S. Johnson
"Queen of the Night"	2019	Hey Violet	Non-album single	J. Johnson; S. Johnson
"In Your Arms" (with X Ambassadors)	2019	Illenium	Ascend	Izquierdo; J. Johnson; S. Johnson
"Not 20 Anymore"	2019	Bebe Rexha	Non-album single	J. Johnson; S. Johnson
"Doing to Me"	2019	Astrid S	Doing to Me	J. Johnson; S. Johnson
"Graveyard"	2019	Halsey	Manic	J. Johnson; S. Johnson
"What Do I Do?"	2019	Georgia Ku	REAL	J. Johnson; S. Johnson
"Slow Dance" (featuring Ava Max)	2019	AJ Mitchell	Skyview	J. Johnson; S. Johnson
"Do It to Myself"	2019	Nova Miller	The Phases	Production only
"Shameless"	2019	Camila Cabello	Romance	J. Johnson; S. Johnson
"Liar"	2019	Camila Cabello	Romance	J. Johnson; S. Johnson
"Bad Kind of Butterflies"	2019	Camila Cabello	Romance	J. Johnson; S. Johnson
"Remember"	2019	Liam Payne	LP1	J. Johnson; S. Johnson; Lomax
"Hips Don't Lie"	2019	Liam Payne	LP1	Izquierdo; J. Johnson; S. Johnson; Lomax
"Down"	2019	Liam Payne	LP1	J. Johnson; S. Johnson; Lomax
"Vulnerable"	2020	Selena Gomez	Rare	J. Johnson; S. Johnson
"For Your Love"	2020	Gunnar	Old Shit	J. Johnson; S. Johnson
"Lonely Eyes"	2020	Lauv	How I'm Feeling	J. Johnson; S. Johnson; Lomax
"Billy"	2020	Lauv	How I'm Feeling	J. Johnson; S. Johnson
"Tell My Mama"	2020	Lauv	How I'm Feeling	J. Johnson; S. Johnson; Lomax
"Invisible Things"	2020	Lauv	How I'm Feeling	J. Johnson; S. Johnson
"Break My Heart"	2020	Dua Lipa	Future Nostalgia	J. Johnson; S. Johnson
"Worse"	2020	New Hope Club	Non-album single	J. Johnson; S. Johnson
"Daisies"	2020	Katy Perry	Smile	J. Johnson; S. Johnson
"Exhale" (featuring Sia)	2020	Kenzie	Non-album single	Lomax
"Play W/ Me"	2020	Bailey Bryan	Fresh Start	J. Johnson; S. Johnson
"Funny"	2020	Zedd and Jasmine Thompson	Non-album singles	J. Johnson; S. Johnson; Lomax
"Difficult"	2020	Amy Allen	Non-album singles	J. Johnson; S. Johnson
"Heaven"	2020	Amy Allen	Non-album singles	J. Johnson; S. Johnson
"Prisoner" (featuring Dua Lipa)	2020	Miley Cyrus	Plastic Hearts	J. Johnson; S. Johnson; Lomax
"Things Are Different"	2021	Picture This	Life In Colour	J. Johnson; S. Johnson
"Overdrive"	2021	Conan Gray	Superache	J. Johnson; S. Johnson
"Selfish" (featuring Jonas Brothers)	2021	Nick Jonas	Spaceman	J. Johnson; S. Johnson; Lomax
"As I Am" (featuring Khalid)	2021	Justin Bieber	Justice	J. Johnson; S. Johnson
"Ghost"	2021	Justin Bieber	Justice	J. Johnson; S. Johnson
"Love You Different" (featuring Beam)	2021	Justin Bieber	Justice	Izquierdo; J. Johnson; S. Johnson; Lomax
"Anyone"	2021	Justin Bieber	Justice	Izquierdo; J. Johnson; S. Johnson
"Name" (featuring Tori Kelly)	2021	Justin Bieber	Justice	J. Johnson; S. Johnson
"All Your Exes"	2021	Julia Michaels	Not in Chronological Order	J. Johnson; S. Johnson
"Love Is Weird"	2021	Julia Michaels	Not in Chronological Order	J. Johnson; S. Johnson
"Pessimist"	2021	Julia Michaels	Not in Chronological Order	J. Johnson; S. Johnson
"Little Did I Know"	2021	Julia Michaels	Not in Chronological Order	Production only
"Lie Like This"	2021	Julia Michaels	Not in Chronological Order	J. Johnson; S. Johnson
"Wrapped Around"	2021	Julia Michaels	Not in Chronological Order	J. Johnson; S. Johnson
"Undertone"	2021	Julia Michaels	Not in Chronological Order	J. Johnson; S. Johnson
"That's the Kind of Woman"	2021	Julia Michaels	Not in Chronological Order	J. Johnson; S. Johnson
"Electric"	2021	Katy Perry	Pokémon 25: The Album	J. Johnson; S. Johnson
"Remember This"	2021	Jonas Brothers	Non-album single	J. Johnson; S. Johnson
"Lost"	2021	Maroon 5	Jordi	Izquierdo; J. Johnson; S. Johnson
"Nobody's Love"	2021	Maroon 5	Jordi	J. Johnson; S. Johnson
"Memories"	2021	Maroon 5	Jordi	J. Johnson; S. Johnson
"Mercy"	2021	Jonas Brothers	Space Jam: A New Legacy	J. Johnson; S. Johnson
"I Wanna Love You But I Don't"	2021	Ben Platt	Reverie	J. Johnson; S. Johnson
"Imagine"	2021	Ben Platt	Reverie	Izquierdo; J. Johnson; S. Johnson
"Chasing Stars" (featuring James Bay)	2021	Alesso and Marshmello	Non-album single	Izquierdo; J. Johnson; S. Johnson
"Out of Focus"	2021	Urban Cone	West Coast	J. Johnson; S. Johnson; Lomax
"Marry Me"	2022	Jennifer Lopez and Maluma	Marry Me	J. Johnson; S. Johnson
"Wild Dreams" (featuring Khalid)	2022	Burna Boy	Love, Damini	J. Johnson; S. Johnson
"Birthday Girl"	2022	Lizzo	Special	J. Johnson; S. Johnson
"In the Kitchen"	2022	Reneé Rapp	Everything to Everyone	J. Johnson; S. Johnson
"All She Wanna Do"	2022	John Legend	Legend	J. Johnson; S. Johnson
"Somebody"	2022	Sam Ryder	There's Nothing but Space, Man!	Coffee Jr.; J. Johnson; S. Johnson
"Mind Games"	2022	88rising and Milli	TBA	J. Johnson; S. Johnson; Lomax
"My Mind & Me"	2022	Selena Gomez	Non-album single	J. Johnson; S. Johnson
"That's What I Get"	2023	charlieonnafriday	TBA	J. Johnson; S. Johnson
"Gone"	2023	Noa Kirel	Non-album single	J. Johnson; S. Johnson; Lomax
"Miracle"	2023	Jonas Brothers	The Album	Izquierdo; J. Johnson; S. Johnson
"Montana Sky"	2023	Jonas Brothers	The Album	J. Johnson; S. Johnson
"Wings"	2023	Jonas Brothers	The Album	J. Johnson; S. Johnson
"Sail Away"	2023	Jonas Brothers	The Album	J. Johnson; S. Johnson
"Americana"	2023	Jonas Brothers	The Album	Izquierdo; J. Johnson; S. Johnson
"Celebrate"	2023	Jonas Brothers	The Album	Izquierdo; J. Johnson; S. Johnson
"Vacation Eyes"	2023	Jonas Brothers	The Album	Additional production only
"Summer Baby"	2023	Jonas Brothers	The Album	J. Johnson; S. Johnson
"Little Bird"	2023	Jonas Brothers	The Album	J. Johnson; S. Johnson
"Minute"	2023	Kim Petras	Feed the Beast	J. Johnson; S. Johnson
"Tiziana"	2023	Glaive	I Care So Much That I Don't Care at All	J. Johnson; S. Johnson
"Love Like This"	2023	Zayn	TBA	J. Johnson; S. Johnson
"Jeans" (featuring Miguel)	2023	Jessie Reyez	Non-single album	J. Johnson; S. Johnson
"Not Done Yet"	2023	Quavo	Rocket Power	Izquierdo; J. Johnson; S. Johnson
"Raindance" (featuring Native Soul)	2023	Jon Batiste	World Music Radio	J. Johnson; S. Johnson
"I do"	2023	Reneé Rapp	Snow Angel (Reneé Rapp album)	J. Johnson; S. Johnson
"Strangers"	2024	Lewis Capaldi	Broken by Desire to Be Heavenly Sent	J. Johnson; S. Johnson
"Lead Me On"	2024	Fletcher	In Search of the Antidote	J. Johnson; S. Johnson
"Love On"	2024	Selena Gomez	Non-album single	J. Johnson; S. Johnson
"Shine On"	2024	Tori Kelly	Tori.	J. Johnson; S. Johnson
"Lemonade"	2024	Lucky Daye	Algorithm	J. Johnson; S. Johnson
"Get By"	2024	Jelly Roll	Beautifully Broken	J. Johnson; S. Johnson
"Unpretty"	2024	Jelly Roll	Beautifully Broken	J. Johnson; S. Johnson
"Everyone Bleeds"	2024	Jelly Roll	Beautifully Broken	J. Johnson; S. Johnson
"Little Light"	2024	Jelly Roll	Beautifully Broken	J. Johnson; S. Johnson
"Ridin"	2024	Jessie Reyes featuring Lil' Wayne	Non-album single	J. Johnson; S. Johnson
"Kiss The Sky"	2024	Maren Morris	The Wild Robot	J. Johnson; S. Johnson
"Two Years"	2024	Rosé	Rosie	J. Johnson; S. Johnson
"Cry For You"	2025	Isabel LaRosa	Raven	J. Johnson; S. Johnson
"Scissors"	2025	Julia Michaels featuring Maren Morris	Non-album singles	J. Johnson; S. Johnson
"Bed No Breakfast"	2025	Maren Morris	Non-album singles	J. Johnson; S. Johnson
"Goliath"	2025	Jessie Reyez	Paid in Memories	J. Johnson; S. Johnson
"Night's We'll Never Have"	2025	Jessie Reyez	Paid in Memories	J. Johnson; S. Johnson
"Head N Headache"	2025	Jessie Reyez feat Lil Yachty	Paid in Memories	J. Johnson; S. Johnson
"Wash"	2025	Jon Bellion	Father Figure	J. Johnson; S. Johnson
"Holy Blindfold"	2025	Chris Brown	Non-album singles	J. Johnson; S. Johnson
"God Went Crazy"	2025	Teddy Swims	Non-album singles	J. Johnson; S. Johnson
"Superstars"	2025	Saweetie featuring Twice	Non-album singles	J. Johnson; S. Johnson
"Box Me Up"	2025	BigXthaPlug featuring Jelly Roll	I Hope You're Happy	J. Johnson; S. Johnson
"Eyes Closed"	2025	Jisoo and Zayn	Non-album single	J. Johnson; S. Johnson
"Die For Me"	2026	Zayn	Konnakol (album)	J. Johnson; S. Johnson
"Sideways"	2026	Zayn	Konnakol (album)	J. Johnson; S. Johnson
"Met Tonight"	2026	Zayn	Konnakol (album)	J. Johnson; S. Johnson
"Focu'Ranni"	2026	Rosalía	Lux	J. Johnson; S. Johnson
Younger You	2026	Miley Cyrus	Hannah Montana 20th Anniversary Special	J. Johnson; S. Johnson
Mama	2026	Latto featuring Jelly Roll	Big Mama	J. Johnson; S. Johnson
Heaven Baby	2026	Ayra Starr featuring Zayn Malik	Starrgirl	J. Johnson; S. Johnson

=== Top 10 Singles ===
Year	Album	Artist	Details	Member
2016	Work From Home	Fifth Harmony	Top 40 Radio #1, Rhythmic Radio #1, Billboard Hot 100 #4	Alexander Izquierdo
2017	Slow Hands	Niall Horan	Top 40 Radio #1, Adult Top 40 Radio #1, Billboard Hot 100 #11	Alexander Izquierdo
2018	The Middle	Zedd featuring Maren Morris & Grey	Top 40 Radio #1, Adult Top 40 Radio #1, Adult Contemporary Radio #1, Hot Dance/Electric Songs #1, Billboard Hot 100 #5, Grammy nominated Song of The Year, Record Of The Year, Best Pop Duo/Group Performance	Jordan Johnson, Stefan Johnson, Marcus Lomax
2019	Graveyard	Halsey	Top 40 Radio #7, US Dance Club Songs #1	Jordan Johnson, Stefan Johnson
2019	Memories	Maroon 5	Top 40 Radio #1, Adult Top 40 Radio #1, Adult Contemporary Radio #1, Billboard Hot 100 #2	Jordan Johnson, Stefan Johnson
2020	Break My Heart	Dua Lipa	Top 40 Radio #1, Adult Top 40 Radio #2, Adult Contemporary Radio #6, Billboard Hot 100 #13	Jordan Johnson, Stefan Johnson
2020	Be Like That	Kane Brown featuring Khalid & Swae Lee	Top 40 Radio #8	Alexander Izquierdo
2020	Levitating	Dua Lipa	Top 40 Radio #1, Adult Top 40 Radio #1, Billboard Hot 100 #2	Clarence Coffee
2021	Anyone	Justin Bieber	Billboard Hot 100 #6	Jordan Johnson, Stefan Johnson
2022	Ghost	Justin Bieber	Top 40 Radio #1, Billboard Hot 100 #5, Adult Top 40 Radio #1, Adult Contemporary Radio #5	Jordan Johnson, Stefan Johnson
