= Middle Ground (song) =

Single by Maroon 5
- Released: May 19, 2023
- Genre: Pop; soft rock
- Length: 3:39
- Label: 222; Interscope
- Songwriters: Adam Levine; Jonathan Bellion; Andrew Wotman; Peter Nappi; Marvin Hemmings; Rodney Jerkins
- Producers: Jon Bellion; Andrew Watt; Nappi

Maroon 5 singles chronology
"Lost" (2021)	"Middle Ground" (2023)	"Priceless" (2025)

Music video
- "Middle Ground" on YouTube

"Middle Ground" is a song by American pop rock band Maroon 5. It was released as a single through 222 and Interscope Records on May 19, 2023.

The remix, a collaboration with American country singer Mickey Guyton, was released on August 11, 2023.

== Background ==
In a March 2023 interview with Ryan Seacrest on On Air with Ryan Seacrest, Adam Levine revealed that new music was to be released within the year. "We are working on something that is unbelievably cool [...] I'm very excited about this thing," he said to Seacrest. On May 11, 2023, the band announced on social media that "Middle Ground" would be released on May 19, 2023.

== Composition ==
A pop and soft rock song, "Middle Ground" was written by Adam Levine, Andrew Watt, Gregory Heinn, Jon Bellion, Marvin Hemmings, Pete Nappi, and Rodney "Darkchild" Jerkins and was produced by Andrew Watt, Jon Bellion, and Pete Nappi.

== Music video ==
The music video for "Middle Ground" was released on May 23, 2023. It was directed by David Dobkin, who has also directed videos for Maroon 5 in the past such as "Sugar", "Girls Like You", and "Memories". The video features appearances from Adam Levine's wife Behati Prinsloo, and their two children, Dusty Rose and Gio Grace Levine, as well as members of the band performing the song in an indoor studio and having an outdoor gathering.

== Live performances ==
On May 23, 2023, Maroon 5 debuted "Middle Ground" live on the season 23 finale of the American reality television series The Voice. It was the group's first performance on the show since performing "Beautiful Mistakes" on the season 20 finale in May 2021. On August 12, 2023, Maroon 5 performing the song with special guest, Mickey Guyton on the final night of Maroon 5: The Las Vegas Residency.

== Critical reception ==
Billboard described "Middle Ground" as a "return to form", reminiscent to Maroon 5's debut studio album, Songs About Jane (2002).

== Track listing ==
Digital download

1. "Middle Ground" – 3:39

Digital download – Remix

1. "Middle Ground" (featuring Mickey Guyton) – 3:39

== Charts ==
Chart performance for "Middle Ground"
Chart (2023–2024)	Peak position
Canadian Digital Song Sales (Billboard)	25
Croatia (HRT)	73
Japan Hot Overseas (Billboard Japan)	6
Netherlands (Single Tip)	30
New Zealand Hot Singles (RMNZ)	25
San Marino (SMRRTV Top 50)	37
Slovakia Airplay (ČNS IFPI)	100
South Korea BGM (Circle)	55
South Korea Download (Circle)	97
US Adult Contemporary (Billboard)	23
US Adult Pop Airplay (Billboard)	15
US Digital Song Sales (Billboard)	32

== Release history ==
Release dates and formats for "Middle Ground"
Region	Date	Format	Version(s)	Label	Ref.
Various	May 19, 2023	Digital download; streaming	Original	222; Interscope	
Various	August 11, 2023	Digital download; streaming	Remix	222; Interscope	
