= Love Is Like =

Studio album by Maroon 5
- Released: August 15, 2025
- Recorded: 2024–2025
- Studios: Secret Garden (Montecito); Center Court (Los Angeles); The Roost (Los Angeles); Conway (Los Angeles); MCP (Los Angeles); Orange Grove (Hollywood); Westlake (West Hollywood); Nightbird (Los Angeles)
- Genres: Pop; R&B; hip-hop
- Length: 27:40
- Labels: 222; Interscope
- Producers: Federico Vindver; JKash (also exec.); Sam Farrar; Elof Loelv; Bobby Love; Rio Root; Adam Levine (exec.)

Maroon 5 chronology
| Jordi (2021) | Love Is Like (2025) |

Singles from Love Is Like
- 1. "Priceless" Released: May 2, 2025; 2. "All Night" Released: June 23, 2025; 3. "California" Released: July 17, 2025; 4. "Love Is Like" Released: August 15, 2025

Love Is Like is the eighth studio album by American pop rock band Maroon 5. Released on August 15, 2025, by 222 and Interscope Records, the album serves as a follow-up to their seventh studio album, Jordi (2021). Produced by Federico Vindver, Jacob "JKash" Kasher Hindlin, and the band's bassist Sam Farrar alongside Noah "Mailbox" Passovoy, Elof Loelv, Bobby Love, and Rio Root, the album was written and recorded throughout the band's Las Vegas residency (2023–2024) and into early 2025 at Conway Studios, Westlake Studios, and Secret Garden, among other studios around the Los Angeles and Santa Barbara areas.

Inspired by the creative process of their earlier works, frontman Adam Levine wanted the songwriting to come internally as opposed to recent studio albums, such as Jordi and Red Pill Blues (2017), where outside writers would produce demos for the band to later expand on. By virtue of its sample-based production, it has been labeled a pop, R&B and hip-hop album with prominent influences of soul, funk, and new wave. The album features guest appearances from American rappers Lil Wayne and Sexyy Red and Thai rapper Lisa. A deluxe digital edition of the album was released on August 16, 2025, featuring three additional tracks, including "Closer" featuring American EDM producer Marshmello.

To support the album, the band embarked on the Love Is Like Tour, in North America with support from American pop singer-songwriter Claire Rosinkranz in October 2025, and continued with Central and South Americas and Europe in 2026, and Asia in 2027. "Priceless" (featuring Lisa) was released as the lead single on May 2, 2025, peaking at number 76 on the US Billboard Hot 100, later becoming a top-ten single in eighteen other regions. The disco-inspired "All Night" was released as the second single in June 2025, followed by "California" in July. The fourth and final single, "Love Is Like" (featuring Lil Wayne), was released on August 15, the same day as the release of the album. The band appeared on The Today Show and performed at the iHeartRadio Music Festival to further promote the album. The album is also the first by the band to fully feature Sam Farrar on bass.

== Background ==
On April 10, 2024, Maroon 5's lead singer Adam Levine announced on The Tonight Show Starring Jimmy Fallon, that the band are working on an album, while during on their Las Vegas residency. The following year, Levine again confirmed with host Jimmy Fallon that the band was planning on releasing the album coming "over the summer". He also revealed that the album would precede a tour starting "in the fall-ish". On June 23, Maroon 5 officially announced their eighth studio album, Love Is Like, for release on August 15. It is the band's first album in four years since Jordi (2021). They also announced a US arena tour in support of the album beginning on October 6 in Phoenix and ending November 25, 2025, in Detroit. The tour continued between 2026 and 2027, with Central America in May, Europe in June and July, South America in August and November 2026, and Asia in January and February 2027. Artists were announced and served as the tour's opening acts including OneRepublic, Jess Glynne, Bradley Simpson, Ella Eyre, Voilà, and Only the Poets in Europe. It is set to conclude on February 12, 2027 in Singapore, comprising 54 dates. Levine stated that, for the album, the band decided that it was time to start writing as a collective again, wanting to re-capture the vibe they had when they first began. Lead guitarist James Valentine said that, while the band decided to pull back from using outside producers in the beginning, they didn't fully cut them out, though the first five tracks the group wrote for the album were mainly written between just the members.

== Singles ==
The album was promoted by four singles. The lead single, "Priceless" featuring Lisa, was released on May 2, 2025. The song debuted at number 76 on the US Billboard Hot 100. The second single, "All Night", was released on June 23. The song debuted at number 76 and peaked at 67 on the Croatia Single Chart. The song's music video was released on June 27 and stars Behati Prinsloo Levine who performed with lip sync through the video while the band performing with Adam Levine himself playing a saxophone. The video is a tribute to Robert Palmer's 1986 hit, "Addicted to Love". The album's third single, "California", was released on July 17, along with an animated lyric video. The title track "Love Is Like" featuring Lil Wayne, was released as the fourth and final single on August 15, the same day as the release of the album. A music video was also released and follows Adam Levine across through the streets of New York City.

== Critical and commercial reception ==
Love Is Like ratings
Aggregate scores
| Source | Rating |
|---|---|
| Metacritic | 50/100 |
Review scores
| Source | Rating |
| AllMusic | 4/5 stars |
| Clash | 3/10 |
| The Irish Times | 2/5 stars |
| Pitchfork | 2.4/10 |
| Rolling Stone | 2.5/5 stars |
| Sputnikmusic | 2.5/5 |

Love Is Like received mixed reviews. On the review aggregator website Metacritic, the album received a score of 50 out of 100 based on 4 reviews, indicating "mixed or average reviews".

In a negative review Linnie Greene of Pitchfork wrote that "the swagger is unconvincing; the odes to reconciliation tepid; even LISA and Lil Wayne can’t rescue these songs from banality" and that "Love Is Like is the latest repackaging of benign background noise for people who register music as something that happens without registering its particulars".

Compared to their previous records, Love Is Like did significantly worse commercially than all other releases under the Maroon 5 name. The album peaked at number 36 on the US Billboard 200 with about 18,000 units, becoming their first studio album not to peak in the top-ten; it was also their first album to not have any top-40 hits (whereas all prior albums had at least one top-ten hit). It also became their first studio album that failed to enter the UK Albums Chart. Elsewhere, it entered the top-twenty in Japan and Switzerland.

== Track listing ==
Love Is Like track listing
| No. | Title | Writer(s) | Producer(s) | Length |
|---|---|---|---|---|
| 1. | "Hideaway" | Adam Levine; Sam Farrar; Natalie "Naliya" Salomon; Jacob Kasher Hindlin; Federico Vindver; Elof Loelv | Vindver; JKash; Loelv^{[a]}; Noah "Mailbox" Passovoy^{[a]}^{[v]}; Farrar^{[a]}; Naliya^{[v]} | 2:49 |
| 2. | "Love Is Like" (featuring Lil Wayne) | Levine; Salomon; Hindlin; Vindver; Rio Root; Bobby Love; Dwayne Carter; Nickolas Ashford; Valerie Simpson; Josephine Armstead | Vindver; JKash; Root; Love; Passovoy^{[v]}; Manny Galvez^{[v]}; Naliya^{[v]} | 2:54 |
| 3. | "All Night" | Levine; Farrar; James Valentine; Hindlin; Vindver; Michael Pollack | Vindver; JKash; Farrar; Passovoy^{[a]}^{[v]} | 2:45 |
| 4. | "Yes I Did" | Levine; Salomon; Vindver; Root; Sam Dees | Vindver; JKash; Root; Passovoy^{[v]}; Naliya^{[v]} | 3:36 |
| 5. | "Priceless" (featuring Lisa) | Levine; Farrar; Hindlin; Vindver; Lisa; Ali Tamposi; Pollack; Rhea Rajagopalan | Vindver; JKash; Passovoy^{[a]}^{[v]}; Farrar^{[a]}; Kuk Harrell^{[v]} | 2:43 |
| 6. | "I Like It" (featuring Sexyy Red) | Levine; Salomon; Hindlin; Vindver; Janae Wherry; Earl Moss; Woody Price | Vindver; JKash; Passovoy^{[v]}; Naliya^{[v]} | 2:32 |
| 7. | "Burn Burn Burn" | Levine; Salomon; Hindlin; Vindver; Root; Charlie Hunter | Vindver; JKash; Root; Passovoy^{[v]}; Naliya^{[v]} | 2:33 |
| 8. | "Jealousy Problems" | Levine; Salomon; Vindver; Loelv; Lenny Goldsmith; Viktor Thylwe | Vindver; JKash; Loelv; Passovoy^{[a]}^{[v]}; Naliya^{[v]} | 2:51 |
| 9. | "My Love" | Levine; Farrar; Hindlin; Vindver; Loelv | JKash; Passovoy^{[a]}^{[v]}; Farrar^{[a]}; Loelv^{[a]}; Naliya^{[v]} | 2:37 |
| 10. | "California" | Levine; Salomon; Vindver | Vindver; JKash; Naliya^{[a]}^{[v]}; Passovoy^{[v]} | 2:16 |
| Total length: | | | | 27:40 |

Love Is Like – deluxe digital edition bonus tracks
| No. | Title | Writer(s) | Producer(s) | Length |
|---|---|---|---|---|
| 11. | "Cigarettes" | Levine; Ryan Tedder; John Ryan; Hindlin; Tyler Spry; Phil Shaouy | Tedder; Spry; Passovoy^{[v]} | 2:24 |
| 12. | "Ice Cream" | Levine; Farrar; Salomon; Hindlin; Vindver; Jasper Harris | Vindver; JKash; Naliya^{[v]}; Passovoy^{[v]} | 2:44 |
| 13. | "Closer" (with Marshmello) | Levine; Salomon; Hindlin; Vindver; Marshmello; Griff Clawson; Kii Kinsella | Vindver; JKash; Marshmello; Naliya^{[v]}; Passovoy^{[v]} | 2:35 |
| Total length: | | | | 35:24 |

Love Is Like – Japanese bonus tracks
| No. | Title | Writer(s) | Length |
|---|---|---|---|
| 11. | "Payphone" (live in Tokyo 2025) | Levine; Benjamin Levin; Ammar Malik; Dan Omelio; Shellback; Cameron Thomaz | 3:21 |
| 12. | "Memories" (live in Tokyo 2025) | Levine; Jonathan Bellion; Hindlin; Pollack; Jordan K. Johnson; Stefan Johnson; Vincent Ford | 4:46 |
| 13. | "Sugar" (live in Tokyo 2025) | Levine; Joshua Coleman; Lukasz Gottwald; Hindlin; Mike Posner; Henry Walter | 6:40 |
| Total length: | | | 42:27 |

- Japan special edition includes standard 10 tracks CD and bonus DVD (live from 2025 Tokyo shows):
1. "This Love"
2. "Sunday Morning"
3. "Payphone"
4. "Memories"
5. "Sugar"

=== Notes ===
- ^{^[a]} signifies an additional producer
- ^{^[v]} signifies a vocal producer
- "Love Is Like" contains a sample of "Silly Wasn't I", written by Nickolas Ashford, Valerie Simpson, and Josephine Armstead, and performed by Simpson.
- "Yes I Did" contains a sample of "I Know Where You're Coming From", written by Sam Dees and performed by Loleatta Holloway.
- "I Like It" contains a sample of "Take Your Time", written by Earl Moss and Woody Price, and performed by the Festivals.
- "Burn Burn Burn" contains a sample of "You Know I Love You", written by Charles Hunter and performed by Barbara Stant.
- "Jealousy Problems" contains a sample of "Zimba Ku", written by Lenny Goldsmith and performed by Black Heat.

== Personnel ==
Credits adapted from the album's liner notes.

=== Maroon 5 ===
- Adam Levine – vocals (all tracks), guitars (tracks 4, 5, 10), additional drums (5), executive production
- James Valentine – guitars (all tracks), additional engineering (1, 3, 4, 7–9), additional percussion (3)
- Jesse Carmichael – guitars (1–7, 9, 11–13); additional keyboards, additional acoustic guitars (10)
- Matt Flynn – drums (all tracks), percussion (1–3, 6, 8, 9, 11–13), additional percussion (5)
- PJ Morton – keyboards (all tracks), synthesizers (5)
- Sam Farrar – bass (all tracks), engineering (1, 3, 5, 9), programming (1, 3, 5, 9, 12), additional percussion (3, 5), additional keyboards (3), additional engineering (4, 7); production (3); additional production (1, 5, 9)

=== Additional musicians ===
- Federico Vindver – synthesizers (1–6, 8–10, 12, 13), drum programming (1–4, 6, 8–10, 12, 13), programming (1–3, 5, 7, 8, 10, 12, 13), keyboards programming (1, 3, 4, 6, 8–10), additional guitars (1, 3, 5, 6, 13), additional percussion (1, 3, 5, 9, 12), additional keyboards (2–10, 12), string arrangements (4, 5), backing vocals (4, 6, 8–10, 12, 13), Wurlitzer (5, 9); additional bass, additional drums (6); additional electric guitar (9, 12), additional acoustic guitars (10), drums (12)
- Lil Wayne – vocals, guitars (2)
- Noah "Mailbox" Passovoy – additional percussion (3, 5, 9, 13), programming (3, 5), backing vocals (3)
- Fred "Papa Freddy Boi" Levine – saxophone (3)
- Jacob Scesney – saxophone (3)
- Davide Rossi – string arrangements, violin, cello, viola (4, 5)
- Lisa – vocals (5)
- Kiel Feher – additional drums (5)
- Naliya – backing vocals (6, 7, 10)
- Sexyy Red – vocals (6)
- Viktor Thylwe – additional guitars, additional bass (8)
- Elof Love – additional guitars, additional bass (8)
- Ryan Tedder – additional vocals (11)
- Kii Kinsella – additional keyboards (13)
- Griff Clawson – additional keyboards (13)

=== Technical and visuals ===
- Federico Vindver – production, engineering (except 11); vocal production (8, 12)
- Jacob "JKash" Hindlin – production, executive production
- Rio Root – production (2, 4, 7)
- Bobby Love – production (2)
- Elof Loelv – production (8); additional production (1)
- Ryan Tedder – production (11)
- Tyler Spry – production (11)
- Marshmello – production (13)
- Noah "Mailbox" Passovoy – vocal production, engineering (all); additional production (1, 3, 5, 6, 8, 9); production coordination
- Naliya – vocal production, engineering (1, 2, 4, 6–10, 12, 13)
- Manny Marroquin – mixing
- Randy Merrill – mastering
- Trey Station – mix engineering
- Ramiro Fernandez-Seoane – mix engineering
- Manny Galvez – vocal production and vocal engineering for Lil Wayne (2)
- Kuk Harrell – vocal production and vocal engineering for Lisa (5)
- Fermin Suero Jr. – vocal engineering for Lisa (5)
- Mateus Mendes – vocal engineering for Sexyy Red (6)
- Tyler Graham – additional engineering (1, 9)
- Tyler Beans – additional engineering (2, 3, 8, 10), engineering assistance (5)
- Ryan Baer – additional engineering (4, 7)
- Noah Bruskin – engineering assistance
- Eric Eylands – engineering assistance (1–3, 5, 8–10)
- Vladimir "Sunny" Laurent – engineering assistance (6)
- Chris Maguire – production coordination
- Michael Lewis – production coordination
- Mat Maitland – art direction, imagery, design
- Hugh Lippe – band photography

== Charts ==
=== Weekly charts ===
Weekly chart performance for Love Is Like
| Chart (2025) | Peak position |
|---|---|
| Austrian Albums (Ö3 Austria) | 72 |
| Belgian Albums (Ultratop Wallonia) | 84 |
| French Albums (SNEP) | 63 |
| German Albums (Offizielle Top 100) | 79 |
| Japanese Albums (Oricon) | 16 |
| Japanese Combined Albums (Oricon) | 22 |
| Japanese Hot Albums (Billboard Japan) | 18 |
| Portuguese Albums (AFP) | 125 |
| Scottish Albums (Official Charts) | 93 |
| Spanish Albums (Promusicae) | 50 |
| Swiss Albums (Schweizer Hitparade) | 20 |
| UK Albums Sales (OCC) | 27 |
| US Billboard 200 | 36 |

=== Monthly charts ===
Monthly chart performance for Love Is Like
| Chart (2025) | Position |
|---|---|
| Japanese Albums (Oricon) | 16 |

=== Year-end charts ===
Year-end chart performance for Love Is Like
| Chart (2025) | Position |
|---|---|
| Japanese Download Albums (Billboard Japan) | 96 |

== Release history ==
Release history and details for Love Is Like
| Region | Date | Format | Label | Ref. |
|---|---|---|---|---|
| Various | August 15, 2025 | CD; vinyl LP; cassette; digital download; streaming | 222; Interscope | |
