= Priceless (song) =

Single by Maroon 5 featuring Lisa

from the album Love Is Like
- Released: May 2, 2025
- Studio: Secret Garden Recording (Montecito); Conway (Los Angeles); Orange Grove (Hollywood); Westlake Recording (West Hollywood)
- Genre: Pop
- Length: 2:43
- Label: 222; Interscope
- Songwriters: Adam Levine; Sam Farrar; Lisa; Federico Vindver; Jacob Kasher Hindlin; Michael Pollack; Ali Tamposi; Rhea Rajagopalan
- Producers: Levine; Farrar; Vindver; JKash; Noah Passovoy

Maroon 5 singles chronology
"Middle Ground" (2023)	"Priceless" (2025)	"All Night" (2025)

Lisa singles chronology
"Fxck Up the World" (2025)	"Priceless" (2025)	"Bad Angel" (2026)

Music video
- "Priceless" on YouTube

"Priceless" is a song by American band Maroon 5 featuring Thai rapper and singer Lisa. It was released through 222 Records and Interscope Records on May 2, 2025, as the lead single from the band's eighth studio album, Love Is Like (2025). A pop song with funk influences, it was produced by lead singer Adam Levine and bassist Sam Farrar from the band, Federico Vindver, JKash, and Mailbox; the former four wrote it alongside Lisa, Michael Pollack, Ali Tamposi, and Rhea Raj. It is the band's first single in almost two years since "Middle Ground", which was released on May 19, 2023.

== Background and release ==
Maroon 5 released their seventh studio album, Jordi, in 2021, followed by the 2023 standalone digital single "Middle Ground" and its remix with Mickey Guyton. In April 2025, lead singer Adam Levine confirmed on The Tonight Show Starring Jimmy Fallon that the band was planning on releasing a single "at the end of the month-ish". The single would precede a new album slated to release around the summer and a tour starting "in the fall-ish". On April 23, 2025, Maroon 5 posted an Instagram photo taken from behind of Levine and a mystery lady standing side by side, staring out of a floor-to-ceiling window at a nighttime cityscape. The next day, Lisa posted a clip with an audio snippet on her Instagram Story of herself lying back while seemingly filming a video in the same outfit as the original photo.

On April 25, Maroon 5 confirmed their collaboration on "Priceless" and posted pre-save links for the release on Spotify and Apple Music alongside a short video showing Levine and Lisa playfully posing together during a photoshoot as the song's chorus played in the background. The band also shared a 15-second teaser on its Instagram Story of the track, while Levine posted black-and-white photos from its music video on his personal Instagram account, featuring a clapperboard with the names of director Aerin Moreno and cinematographer Russ Fraser as well as an aerial view image of Levine and Lisa resting against a balcony. On April 28, Maroon 5 revealed the song's release date of May 2 and its cover art featuring Levine and Lisa.

== Composition ==
"Priceless" is a pop song with funk influences. It was written by the band's lead singer Levine, its bass guitarist Sam Farrar, the featured artist Lisa, Ali Tamposi, Federico Vindver, Jacob Kasher Hindlin, Michael Pollack, and Rhea Raj. It was produced by Levine, Farrar, Noah "Mailbox" Passovoy, JKash, and Vindver. Jelli Dorman, Passovoy, and Kuk Harrell served as vocal producers with Passovoy, Trey Station, and Ramiro Fernandez-Seoane listed as engineers. The song marks a return to Maroon 5's previous guitar-driven sound from the 2000s paired with Lisa's confident rap feature. According to Levine, the song "happened first for us while we were recording the album. I think it's just the purest and we are so happy to have Lisa on it. The guitar intro is literally me playing into an audio message on my iPhone with an unplugged guitar. I actually got a little emotional recording 'cause it was sort of reconnecting to our roots, which a lot of our fans have been saying 'hey we want to hear that sound again'. It's been like over 20 years so I think it's time for that to return". The band's lead guitarist James Valentine added that he "got super emotional when Adam sent me the original demo of 'Priceless' because for me the sound represents Maroon 5's earlier days" and that the song "established the writing and sound for our upcoming album".

== Critical reception ==
The song received mixed to negative reviews. In her review for Rolling Stone, Sarah Grant commended the song's "catchy, scratchy guitar groove" in which guitarist James Valentine "slips in a few unshackled jags". However, she was underwhelmed by Lisa's guest feature, calling it a "wasted opportunity" as she was "mixed too anonymously into the sonic wallpaper." Robin Murray of Clash praised Lisa as "obviously a goddess" while criticizing the songwriting underpinning the song as "poor fare". Pitchfork's Linnie Greene wrote that even a "glittery" guest star like Lisa couldn't save the song from "banality". Paste named "Priceless" the eighth worst song of 2025, with Grant Sharples lambasting the "offensively awful" songwriting and the instrumental as the "aural equivalent of dry wheat toast". He noted that Lisa in the bridge "attempts to resuscitate this corpse of a tune but to no avail."

== Music video ==
A music video for "Priceless" was released alongside the single on Maroon 5's YouTube channel. Directed by Aerin Moreno, the clip was shot in downtown Los Angeles at the Westin Bonaventure Hotel, on 35mm film. It depicts Levine and Lisa in a contentious relationship inspired by the film Mr. & Mrs. Smith (2005).

== Personnel ==
Credits adapted from the liner notes of Love is Like.

Recording

- Recorded at Secret Garden Recording (Montecito, California), Conway Studios (Los Angeles, California), Orange Grove (Hollywood, California), and Westlake Recording Studios (West Hollywood, California)
- Mixed at Larrabee Studios (North Hollywood, California)
- Mastered at Sterling Sound

Personnel

- Adam Levine – vocals, songwriter, additional drums
- Lisa – vocals, songwriter
- James Valentine – guitar
- Jesse Carmichael – guitar
- Matt Flynn – drums
- PJ Morton – keys, synths
- Sam Farrar – songwriter, additional producer, additional percussion, programming, engineer
- JKash – songwriter, producer
- Federico Vindver – songwriter, producer, synths, wurlitzer, string arrangements, additional guitars, additional keys, additional percussion, programming
- Ali Tamposi – songwriter
- Michael Pollack – songwriter
- Rhea Rajagopalan – songwriter
- Noah "Mailbox" Passovoy – additional producer, vocal producer, additional percussion, programming, engineer
- Kuk Harrell – vocal producer, vocal engineer
- Davide Rossi – string arrangements, strings (violin, cello, viola)
- Kiel Feher – additional drums, additional percussion
- Matt Flynn – additional percussion
- Fermin Suero Jr. – vocal engineer
- Manny Marroquin – mix engineer
- Trey Station – mix engineer
- Ramiro Fernandez-Seoane – mix engineer
- Randy Merrill – mastering engineer

== Charts ==
=== Weekly charts ===
Weekly chart performance
Chart (2025)	Peak position
Argentina Anglo Airplay (Monitor Latino)	4
Belgium (Ultratop 50 Wallonia)	47
Bolivia Airplay (Monitor Latino)	20
Canada Hot 100 (Billboard)	80
Canada CHR/Top 40 (Billboard)	28
Canada Hot AC (Billboard)	20
Central America Anglo Airplay (Monitor Latino)	5
Chile Anglo Airplay (Monitor Latino)	10
China (TME Korean)	81
CIS Airplay (TopHit)	28
Colombia Anglo Airplay (Monitor Latino)	10
Costa Rica Anglo Airplay (Monitor Latino)	14
Croatia International Airplay (Top lista)	4
Czech Republic Airplay (ČNS IFPI)	38
Dominican Republic Anglo Airplay (Monitor Latino)	2
Ecuador Anglo Airplay (Monitor Latino)	4
Estonia Airplay (TopHit)	10
Finland Airplay (Radiosoittolista)	56
Global 200 (Billboard)	40
Guatemala Anglo Airplay (Monitor Latino)	3
Japan Hot Overseas (Billboard Japan)	2
Kazakhstan Airplay (TopHit)	55
Latin America Anglo Airplay (Monitor Latino)	7
Lithuania Airplay (TopHit)	9
Malaysia International (RIM)	9
Malta Airplay (Radiomonitor)	6
Mexico Anglo Airplay (Monitor Latino)	8
Netherlands (Dutch Top 40)	40
New Zealand Hot Singles (RMNZ)	7
Nicaragua Anglo Airplay (Monitor Latino)	1
Nigeria (TurnTable Top 100)	75
North Macedonia Airplay (Radiomonitor)	4
Panama Anglo Airplay (Monitor Latino)	3
Paraguay Anglo Airplay (Monitor Latino)	2
Peru Anglo Airplay (Monitor Latino)	2
Philippines (Philippines Hot 100)	87
Poland (Polish Airplay Top 100)	19
Puerto Rico Anglo Airplay (Monitor Latino)	4
Romania Airplay (TopHit)	42
Russia Airplay (TopHit)	48
San Marino Airplay (SMRTV Top 50)	5
Serbia Airplay (Radiomonitor)	1
Singapore (RIAS)	20
Slovakia Airplay (ČNS IFPI)	22
Slovenia Airplay (Radiomonitor)	20
South Korea BGM (Circle)	36
South Korea Download (Circle)	54
Taiwan (Billboard)	17
Thailand (IFPI)	2
UK Singles (Official Charts)	69
Uruguay Anglo Airplay (Monitor Latino)	4
US Billboard Hot 100	76
US Adult Contemporary (Billboard)	16
US Adult Pop Airplay (Billboard)	6
US Pop Airplay (Billboard)	18

=== Monthly charts ===
Monthly chart performance
Chart (2025)	Peak position
CIS Airplay (TopHit)	28
Estonia Airplay (TopHit)	13
Kazakhstan Airplay (TopHit)	68
Lithuania Airplay (TopHit)	12
Romania Airplay (TopHit)	52
Russia Airplay (TopHit)	48

=== Year-end charts ===
Year-end chart performance
Chart (2025)	Position
Argentina Anglo Airplay (Monitor Latino)	18
Canada CHR/Top 40 (Billboard)	99
Canada Hot AC (Billboard)	40
CIS Airplay (TopHit)	142
Estonia Airplay (TopHit)	53
Lithuania Airplay (TopHit)	35
Romania Airplay (TopHit)	183
US Adult Pop Airplay (Billboard)	24

== Certifications ==
Certifications for "Priceless"
Region	Certification	Certified units/sales
Brazil (Pro-Música Brasil)	Gold	20,000^{‡}
^{‡} Sales+streaming figures based on certification alone.

== Release history ==
Release dates and formats for "Priceless"
Region	Date	Format	Label	Ref.
Various	May 2, 2025	Digital download; streaming	222; Interscope	
Italy	May 2, 2025	Radio airplay	Universal	
United States	May 6, 2025	Contemporary hit radio	Interscope	
Various	July 4, 2025	7-inch vinyl	222; Interscope	
