= Marvin Hemmings =

American singer, songwriter, producer, multi-instrumentalist

Marvin Anthony Hemmings Jr.
- Born: August 14, 1979 (age 46)
- Other names: Tony, Toneworld
- Musical career
- Genres: R&B; soul; gospel; hip-hop
- Occupations: Songwriter; producer; pianist
- Label: BMI Publishing
- Website: www.toneworldmusic.com

Marvin Hemmings, also known as Toneworld, is an American songwriter, producer, and pianist, best known for his work alongside producer Rodney Jerkins, as well as producing Top 10 gospel single "Withholding Nothing" by William McDowell. Hemmings has written and produced for Justin Bieber, Brandy, and others, and has also composed music for Empire and The High Note.

== Songwriting, piano and production credits ==
Title	Year	Artist	Album
"Circle Of Love"	2006	Sisaundra Lewis	Shout
"Warm It Up (With Love)"	2008	Brandy	Human
"Piano Man"	2008	Brandy	Human
"Withholding Nothing"	2013	William McDowell	Withholding Nothing
"Shine"	2016	Joy Enriquez	The Call
"Walking On Water"	2016	Joy Enriquez	The Call
"Shelter"	2016	Joy Enriquez	The Call
"The Call"	2016	Joy Enriquez	The Call
"70,000"	2016	Joy Enriquez	The Call
"Wonderful"	2016	Joy Enriquez	The Call
"Born To Win" (Featuring Jussie Smollett)	2016	Empire Cast	Non-album single
"Crazy Crazy 4 U" (Featuring Rumer Willis)	2017	Empire Cast	Empire: Original Soundtrack Season 3
"Dangerous" (With Estelle & Jussie Smollett)	2017	Empire Cast	Empire: Original Soundtrack Season 3
"Over Everything" (Featuring Jussie Smollett & Yazz)	2017	Empire Cast	Empire: Original Soundtrack Season 3
"Mama (Stripped Down Version)" (Featuring Jussie Smollett)	2017	Empire Cast	Empire: Original Soundtrack Season 3
"The Father the Sun (Rap Mix)" (Featuring Jussie Smollett & Fetty Wap)	2017	Empire Cast	Empire: Original Soundtrack Season 3
"Rockin' Around the Christmas Tree"	2018	Jessie J	This Christmas Day
"Jingle Bell Rock"	2018	Jessie J	This Christmas Day
"Love Myself (The High Note)"	2020	Tracee Ellis Ross	The High Note
"New To Me"	2020	Tracee Ellis Ross	The High Note
"Track 8"	2020	Kelvin Harrison Jr.	The High Note
"Chemistry"	2020	Kelvin Harrison Jr.	The High Note
"Like I Do"	2020	Tracee Ellis Ross & Kelvin Harrison Jr.	The High Note
"It's OK To Be Black"	2020	Jac Ross	Non-album single
"There She Go" (Featuring Lil Uzi Vert)	2021	Justin Bieber	Justice (Triple Chucks Deluxe)
"Surrender"	2022	VanJess	Homegrown
"Don't Cry for Me" (Sam Feldt Remix)	2022	Whitney Houston	I Wanna Dance with Somebody (The Movie: Whitney New, Classic and Reimagined)
"Don't Cry for Me" (Darkchild Film Version)	2022	Whitney Houston	I Wanna Dance with Somebody (The Movie: Whitney New, Classic and Reimagined)
"Endlessly"	2023	Kali Uchis	Red Moon in Venus
"Middle Ground"	2023	Maroon 5	TBA
"Genesis"	2024	Raye	Non-album single
"Winter Woman."	2026	Raye	This Music May Contain Hope.

== Awards and nominations ==
Year	Ceremony	Award	Result	Ref
2022	64th Annual Grammy Awards	Album of the Year (Justice (Triple Chucks Deluxe))	Nominated	
