= Lost (Maroon 5 song) =

2021 single by Maroon 5

Single by Maroon 5

from the album Jordi
- Released: June 11, 2021
- Recorded: 2021
- Genre: Tropical house; pop
- Length: 2:52
- Label: 222; Interscope; Polydor
- Songwriters: Adam Levine; Jacob Kasher Hindlin; Michael Pollack; Jonathan Bellion; Alexander Izquierdo; Stefan Johnson; Jordan K. Johnson
- Producer: The Monsters & Strangerz

Maroon 5 singles chronology
| "Beautiful Mistakes" (2021) | "Lost" (2021) | "Middle Ground" (2023) |

Music video
- "Lost" on YouTube

"Lost" is a song by American band Maroon 5. It was released on June 11, 2021, through 222, Interscope, and Polydor Records as the fourth and final single from their seventh studio album, Jordi, along with the album. The band's lead singer, Adam Levine, wrote the song alongside the song's producers, the Monsters & Strangerz' group members, Eskeerdo, Jordan K. Johnson, and Stefan Johnson, alongside Jon Bellion, Michael Pollack, and Jacob Kasher Hindlin.

== Background ==
On the deluxe edition of the album's track-by-track descriptions on Apple Music, Maroon 5's lead singer, Adam Levine, provided insight on the creation of "Lost":

"Lost" is actually one of my favorites we've ever done. I think it just captures everything the band stands for, all in one song. Whether you liked us back then, whether you like us now, whether you'll like us later, I think this is kind of a classic sound that we've always had. And the song, the lyrics actually were a great process and I worked a lot. They took a while, and that's, to me, the most important contribution I think that I made to any record. Just sitting with them and really trying to make sure everybody understood what I was saying and not trying to shroud it too much in any metaphor.

"Lost" is a tropical house-pop song. It is a "spare, open-hearted ode to finding love in a lonely world". On May 5, 2021, when the band announced the Target edition of the album, the title of the song was revealed when fans could pre-order it.

== Critical reception ==
The song received negative reviews, Rolling Stone listed it among the worst songs of 2021, saying that it's "repetitive and dull" and "beyond forgettable". In a negative review of Jordi, Kate Solomon of i described both "Lost" and another track from the album, "Echo", featuring American singer-songwriter Blackbear, as possibly "the same song", explaining that "it is perfectly crafted to please crowds, to slip into your consciousness without you really realising - and if you find yourself buying a new car after listening, then its work here is probably done. Writing for NME, El Hunt reported that Maroon 5 tried to emulate the "eeriness" of American singer and songwriter Billie Eilish.

== Live performances ==
On March 31, 2021, Maroon 5 debuted "Lost" in a virtual concert as part of the American Express Unstaged series. On June 10, the day before the band released "Lost" and Jordi, they performed the song on The Late Show with Stephen Colbert.

== Music video ==
The official music video premiered alongside the release of the song and album on June 11, 2021. Directed by Sophie Muller and shot in Malibu, California. The band members of Maroon 5 are seen performing the song on a beach in a foggy scene. Frontman Adam Levine is later pictured swimming underwater with his wife, Namibian model Behati Prinsloo Levine, who plays the role of a mermaid in the accompanying visuals.

== Credits and personnel ==
Credits adapted from Tidal.

- Adam Levine – vocals, songwriting
- James Valentine – guitar
- The Monsters & Strangerz – production, vocal production, programming, songwriting
  - Eskeerdo – production, vocal production, programming, songwriting
  - Jordan K. Johnson – production, vocal production, programming, songwriting
  - Stefan Johnson – production, vocal production, programming, songwriting
- Jon Bellion – background vocals, songwriting
- Michael Pollack – background vocals, songwriting
- Jacob Kasher Hindlin – songwriting
- Gian Stone – vocal production
- Noah "Mailbox" Passovoy – vocal production, recording, studio personnel
- Ashley Jacobson – assistant recording, studio personnel
- Eric Eylands – assistant recording, studio personnel
- Sam Schamburg – assistant recording, studio personnel
- John Hanes – engineering, studio personnel
- Serban Ghenea – mixing, engineering, studio personnel
- Randy Merrill – mastering, studio personnel

== Charts ==
=== Weekly charts ===
Weekly chart performance for "Lost"
| Chart (2021) | Peak position |
|---|---|
| Argentina Hot 100 (Billboard) | 94 |
| Australia (ARIA) | 88 |
| Canada Hot 100 (Billboard) | 69 |
| Canada AC (Billboard) | 31 |
| Canada CHR/Top 40 (Billboard) | 41 |
| Canada Hot AC (Billboard) | 21 |
| Croatia (HRT) | 98 |
| Czech Republic Airplay (ČNS IFPI) | 12 |
| Global 200 (Billboard) | 81 |
| Hungary (Rádiós Top 40) | 30 |
| Hungary (Single Top 40) | 23 |
| Ireland (IRMA) | 100 |
| Japan Hot Overseas (Billboard) | 10 |
| New Zealand Hot Singles (RMNZ) | 6 |
| San Marino (SMRRTV Top 50) | 30 |
| Slovakia Airplay (ČNS IFPI) | 42 |
| South Korea Download (Gaon) | 75 |
| Sweden Heatseeker (Sverigetopplistan) | 4 |
| US Bubbling Under Hot 100 (Billboard) | 7 |
| US Adult Contemporary (Billboard) | 23 |
| US Adult Pop Airplay (Billboard) | 13 |
| US Pop Airplay (Billboard) | 27 |
| Venezuela Anglo (Record Report) | 12 |
| Venezuela Pop (Record Report) | 34 |

=== Year-end charts ===
Year-end chart performance for "Lost"
| Chart (2021) | Position |
|---|---|
| US Adult Top 40 (Billboard) | 48 |

== Certifications ==
Certifications and sales for "Lost"
| Region | Certification | Certified units/sales |
|---|---|---|
| Brazil (Pro-Música Brasil) | Gold | 20,000^{‡} |
| Italy (FIMI) | Gold | 50,000^{‡} |
| New Zealand (RMNZ) | Gold | 15,000^{‡} |
^{‡} Sales+streaming figures based on certification alone.

== Release history ==
Release history for "Lost"
| Country | Date | Format | Label | Ref. |
|---|---|---|---|---|
| Italy | June 18, 2021 | Contemporary hit radio | Universal | |
| United States | July 13, 2021 | Contemporary hit radio | 222; Interscope | |
