= I Wanna Dance with Somebody (soundtrack) =

I Wanna Dance with Somebody (The Movie: Whitney New, Classic and Reimagined)

Soundtrack album by Whitney Houston and various artists
- Released: December 16, 2022
- Recorded: 1983–2022
- Length: 145:29
- Label: RCA
- Producers: Rodney Jerkins; Marvin "Tony" Hemmings

Whitney Houston chronology
I Wish You Love: More from The Bodyguard (2017)	I Wanna Dance with Somebody (The Movie: Whitney New, Classic and Reimagined) (2022)	Japanese Singles Collection -Greatest Hits- (2022)

I Wanna Dance with Somebody (The Movie: Whitney New, Classic and Reimagined) is the soundtrack album to the biographical film, Whitney Houston: I Wanna Dance with Somebody, based on the life of American singer and actress Whitney Houston. The soundtrack was released by RCA Records on December 16, 2022, a week before the film's theatrical release. The album was produced by Rodney Jerkins and Marvin "Tony" Hemmings and executive produced by Clive Davis, who also serves as one of the producers of the film.

== Content and release ==
I Wanna Dance with Somebody soundtrack comprises 35 tracks, most of which are by Houston chronicling her career. It also includes reimagined remixes of some of Houston's classics featuring producers such as Sam Feldt, Moto Blanco and P2J and contemporary acts of various genres; Lucky Daye, Oxlade, Pheelz and Samaria. The album also features unreleased recordings from Houston's vault, including the Michael Masser composed soul ballad "Far Enough", "Moment of Truth" culled from the Whitney album sessions of 1986. Two covers from the Winans family, "Tomorrow", originally recorded by The Winans and in which Houston is joined by Samaria, and "Don't Cry for Me", which Houston covered from BeBe & CeCe Winans originally at the Commitment to Life benefit concert for AIDS Project Los Angeles in January 1994. The latter track includes a remastered ballad production by Jerkins and an a cappella version. It is Houston's first posthumous soundtrack release since her death in 2012.

In 2023, Houston's official website announced that the soundtrack via RCA Records would be released as a two-disc set limited edition available only through the official Whitney Houston webstore on July 13. The double set would include all 35 tracks same as the digital release, including the unreleased "Far Enough", "Don't Cry For Me", and Houston's first posthumous 2019 hit single "Higher Love" with DJ Kygo.

== Track listing ==
I Wanna Dance with Somebody (The Movie: Whitney New, Classic and Reimagined) – Standard edition
No.	Title	Writer(s)	Artist(s)	Length
1.	"I Wanna Dance with Somebody (Who Loves Me)" (P2J Remix)	George Merrill; Shannon Rubicam	Whitney Houston; P2J	4:30
2.	"Don't Cry for Me" (Sam Feldt Remix)	Keith Thomas; BeBe Winans	Houston; Sam Feldt	3:19
3.	"Higher Love" (with Kygo)	Steve Winwood; Will Jennings	Houston; Kygo	3:48
4.	"The Greatest Love of All" (Jax Jones Remix)	Michael Masser; Linda Creed	Houston; Jax Jones	3:14
5.	"I'm Every Woman" (SG Lewis Remix)	Nickolas Ashford; Valerie Simpson	Houston; Lewis	4:04
6.	"How Will I Know" (with Clean Bandit)	Merrill; Rubicam	Houston; Clean Bandit	3:33
7.	"I Love the Lord" (Great John Remix)	Richard Smallwood	Houston; Winans; Great John	3:08
8.	"Don't Cry for Me" (Darkchild film version)	Thomas; Winans	Houston	3:53
9.	"Honest" (Heartbreak Hotel)	Carsten Schack; Kenneth Karlin; Tamara Savage; Brown	Houston; Lucky Daye	3:49
10.	"Okay" (It's Not Right)	R. Jerkins; Fred Jerkins III; LaShawn Daniels; Isaac Phillips; Toni Estes; Abdulrahman	Houston; Oxlade; Pheelz	2:16
11.	"You'll Never Stand Alone" (Moto Blanco Remix)	Diane Warren	Houston; Moto Blanco	3:44
12.	"Love Will Save the Day" (MATVEÏ Remix)	Toni Colandreo	Houston; MATVEÏ	3:32
13.	"Tomorrow"	Carvin Winans; Debbie Winans	Houston; Samaria	3:27
14.	"Home" (live from the Merv Griffin Show)	Charlie Smalls	Houston	4:39
15.	"You Give Good Love"	La Forrest "La La" Cope	Houston	4:36
16.	"Saving All My Love for You"	Masser; Gerry Goffin	Houston	3:59
17.	"If You Say My Eyes Are Beautiful" (featuring Jermaine Jackson)	Elliot Willensky	Houston; Jermaine Jackson	4:19
18.	"Far Enough"	Masser; Goffin; Leon Ware	Houston	4:39
19.	"I Wanna Dance with Somebody (Who Loves Me)"	Merrill; Rubicam	Houston	4:52
20.	"So Emotional"	Billy Steinberg; Tom Kelly	Houston	4:37
21.	"Where Do Broken Hearts Go"	Frank Wildhorn; Chuck Jackson	Houston	4:39
22.	"Moment of Truth"	Jane Buckingham; David Paul Bryant	Houston	4:37
23.	"I'm Your Baby Tonight"	Kenneth "Babyface" Edmonds; Antonio "L.A." Reid	Houston	5:00
24.	"The Star Spangled Banner" (featuring the Florida Orchestra; live at Super Bowl XXV)	Francis Scott Key	Houston	2:14
25.	"One Moment in Time"	Albert Hammond; John Bettis	Houston	4:44
26.	"I Will Always Love You" (live from the Concert for a New South Africa)	Dolly Parton	Houston	5:59
27.	"Medley: I Loves You, Porgy / And I Am Telling You I'm Not Going / I Have Nothing" (live from the 21st Annual American Music Awards)	George Gershwin; Ira Gershwin; Tom Eyen; Henry Krieger; Linda Thompson; David Foster	Houston	10:00
28.	"Run to You"	Jud Friedman; Allan Rich	Houston	4:25
29.	"Impossible Things" (Leikeli47 Remix)	Leikeli47	Houston; Leikeli47	3:02
30.	"Why Does It Hurt So Bad" (from Waiting to Exhale – Original Soundtrack)	Kenneth "Babyface" Edmonds	Houston	4:37
31.	"It's Not Right but It's Okay"	R. Jerkins; Fred Jerkins III; LaShawn Daniels; Isaac Phillips; Toni Estes	Houston	4:52
32.	"My Love Is Your Love"	Wyclef Jean; Jerry Duplessis	Houston	4:21
33.	"I Didn't Know My Own Strength" (live from The Oprah Winfrey Show Season Premiere Part II – Whitney Houston's Show-Stopping Surprise)	Houston; Warren	Houston	4:38
34.	"Clive's Message"	Clive Davis	Clive Davis	0:38
35.	"Don't Cry for Me" (a cappella)	Thomas; Winans	Houston	3:48
Total length:				145:29

Notes

- Tracks 1, 2, 4, 5, 6, 7, 9, 10, 11, 12, 29, 34, and 35 do not appear anywhere in the film, in the given version here.

Sample credits

- "Honest (Heartbreak Hotel)" contains a sample of "Heartbreak Hotel", sung by Houston, Faith Evans and Kelly Price.
- "Okay (It's Not Right)" contains a sample of "It's Not Right but It's Okay", sung by Houston.
- "Impossible Things" contains a sample of "Impossible/It's Possible", sung by Houston and Brandy.

== Personnel ==
- Rodney Jerkins – producer, executive producer
- Marvin Hemmings – producer
- Michael Masser – producer
- Narada Michael Walden – producer
- David Foster – producer
- Babyface – producer
- L.A. Reid – producer
- Kashif – producer
- Kygo – producer
- Wyclef Jean – producer
- Jerry Duplessis – producer
- Mervyn Warren – producer
- Kenneth Karlin – producer
- Carsten Schack – producer
- Sam Feldt – producer
- P2J – producer
- MATVEÏ – producer
- SG Lewis – producer
- Jax Jones – producer
- Johnathan "Great John" Scott – producer
- Moto Blanco – producer
- Jack Patterson – producer
- Clive Davis – executive producer
- Karen Lamberton, Keith Naftaly – album compilation producer

Adapted from album liner notes

== Charts ==
Chart performance for I Wanna Dance with Somebody (The Movie: Whitney New, Classic and Reimagined)
Chart (2022–2023)	Peak position
Australian Albums (ARIA)	83
Japan Download Albums (Billboard Japan)	75
UK Album Downloads (Official Charts)	17
UK Soundtrack Albums (Official Charts)	13

== Release history ==
Country	Date	Label(s)	Format	Edition
United States	December 16, 2022	RCA Records	digital download	Standard
United Kingdom	December 16, 2022	RCA Records	digital download	Standard
Australia	December 16, 2022	RCA Records	digital download	Standard
United States	July 13, 2023	RCA Records	CD. digital download	Standard
