= Nobody's Love =

2020 single by Maroon 5

Single by Maroon 5

from the album Jordi
- Released: July 24, 2020
- Length: 3:31
- Label: 222; Interscope
- Songwriters: Adam Levine; Jacob Kasher Hindlin; Michael Pollack; Nija Charles; Kareem Lomax; Rosina Russell; Stefan Johnson; Jordan K. Johnson; Ryan Ogren; Brandon Hamlin
- Producers: The Monsters & Strangerz; Ryan Ogren; B HAM; German

Maroon 5 singles chronology
"Memories" (2019)	"Nobody's Love" (2020)	"Beautiful Mistakes" (2021)

Music video
- "Nobody's Love" on YouTube

"Nobody's Love" is a song by American band Maroon 5, released through 222 and Interscope Records on July 24, 2020, as the second single from the band's seventh studio album Jordi (2021). It is their first single without bassist Mickey Madden. The song was inspired by the COVID-19 pandemic and the George Floyd protests.

Peaking at number 41 on the Billboard Hot 100, it became their first single to fail to chart in the Top 40 since 2015's "Feelings" failed to chart altogether. However, the single became their seventh consecutive top-ten hit on Billboard's Adult Top 40 chart and record-extending 26th overall.

The remix, a collaboration with Jamaican singer-songwriter Popcaan, was released on October 16, 2020.

== Background ==
On July 20, 2020, Maroon 5 announced that "Nobody's Love" will be released at midnight on July 24, 2020. The band also unveiled the single's cover art, which shows a mysterious, vivid and colorful image of a woman looking at the ocean. This cover also has three different versions, all made in Technicolor and with a Smiley face logo.

The song was inspired by the George Floyd protests and the ongoing COVID-19 pandemic, according to Adam Levine, who said: "The entire process of perfecting this song was done with the whole world in mind. I'm hoping that "Nobody's Love" is a song that can give everyone a moment of peace and reflection during this unprecedented moment in our world's story. Whether you are an essential worker on the front lines, an outspoken citizen fighting for social justice, or just someone who needs a break to remember the potent power of love, this song is for everyone".

== Music video ==
The music video for "Nobody's Love" premiered on YouTube, at midnight 12AM (EST) and was directed by David Dobkin. It was shot on the Apple iPhone and filmed in isolation in Los Angeles, California. The video features an alone Adam Levine, sitting in a wooden chair in a backyard at night and smoking a marijuana cigarette. In a joint letter with ACLU, Maroon 5 explained the events in the video:

"It’s time to end the War on Marijuana. The aggressive enforcement of marijuana possession laws needlessly ensnares hundreds of thousands of people into the criminal justice system and wastes billions of taxpayers' dollars,". "What’s more, it is carried out with staggering racial bias. Despite being a priority for police departments nationwide, the War on Marijuana has failed to reduce marijuana use and availability and diverted resources that could be better invested in our communities."

=== Lyric video ===
A lyric video of the song was released on August 26, 2020. The visual employs the same color-changing aesthetic of the single's cover art, with calming scenes of waves crashing against the coastline.

== Live performances ==
On August 10, 2020, Maroon 5 performed "Nobody's Love" for the first time on The Late Show with Stephen Colbert (as part of #Play at Home series), with the band members playing instruments separately in their own homes while in quarantine.

== Track listing ==
Digital download
1. "Nobody's Love" – 3:31

Digital download – Popcaan Remix

1. "Nobody's Love" (Popcaan Remix) – 3:33

== Charts ==
=== Weekly charts ===
Weekly chart performance for "Nobody's Love"
Chart (2020)	Peak position
Australia (ARIA)	70
Belgium (Ultratip Bubbling Under Flanders)	6
Belgium (Ultratop 50 Wallonia)	37
Canada Hot 100 (Billboard)	33
Canada AC (Billboard)	4
Canada CHR/Top 40 (Billboard)	14
Canada Hot AC (Billboard)	5
Croatia (HRT)	17
Czech Republic Airplay (ČNS IFPI)	54
Global 200 (Billboard)	119
Greece (IFPI)	89
Ireland (IRMA)	65
Italian Airplay (EarOne)	10
Japan Hot 100 (Billboard)	68
Lithuania (AGATA)	60
Mexico Ingles Airplay (Billboard)	11
Netherlands (Dutch Tipparade 40)	22
Netherlands (Single Tip)	15
New Zealand Hot Singles (RMNZ)	2
Portugal (AFP)	119
San Marino (SMRRTV Top 50)	29
Scottish Singles Sales (Official Charts)	49
Singapore (RIAS)	25
Slovakia Airplay (ČNS IFPI)	6
South Korea (Gaon)	118
UK Singles (Official Charts)	84
US Billboard Hot 100	41
US Adult Contemporary (Billboard)	14
US Adult Pop Airplay (Billboard)	7
US Dance Airplay (Billboard)	35
US Pop Airplay (Billboard)	14
US Rolling Stone Top 100	27
Venezuela Anglo (Record Report)	27
Venezuela Pop (Record Report)	45
Venezuela Rock (Record Report)	5

=== Year-end charts ===
2020 year-end chart performance for "Nobody's Love"
Chart (2020)	Position
US Adult Contemporary (Billboard)	38
US Adult Top 40 (Billboard)	26

== Certifications ==
Certifications and sales for "Nobody's Love"
Region	Certification	Certified units/sales
Australia (ARIA)	Gold	35,000^{‡}
Brazil (Pro-Música Brasil)	Platinum	40,000^{‡}
Canada (Music Canada)	Gold	40,000^{‡}
Italy (FIMI)	Gold	35,000^{‡}
New Zealand (RMNZ)	Gold	15,000^{‡}
United States (RIAA)	Gold	500,000^{‡}
^{‡} Sales+streaming figures based on certification alone.

== Release history ==
Release dates and formats for "Nobody's Love"
Region	Date	Format	Version(s)	Label	Ref.
Various	July 24, 2020	Digital download; streaming	Original	222; Interscope	
Italy	July 24, 2020	Contemporary hit radio	Original	Universal	
United States	July 27, 2020	Hot adult contemporary radio	Original	222; Interscope	
United States	July 28, 2020	Contemporary hit radio	Original	222; Interscope	
Australia	July 31, 2020	Contemporary hit radio	Original	Universal	
Russia	August 3, 2020	Contemporary hit radio	Original	Universal	
Various	October 16, 2020	Digital download; streaming	Popcaan Remix	222; Interscope	
