= List of number-one songs of 2019 (Singapore) =

This is a list of the Singapore Top 30 Digital Streaming number-one songs in 2019, according to the Recording Industry Association Singapore.

== Chart history ==
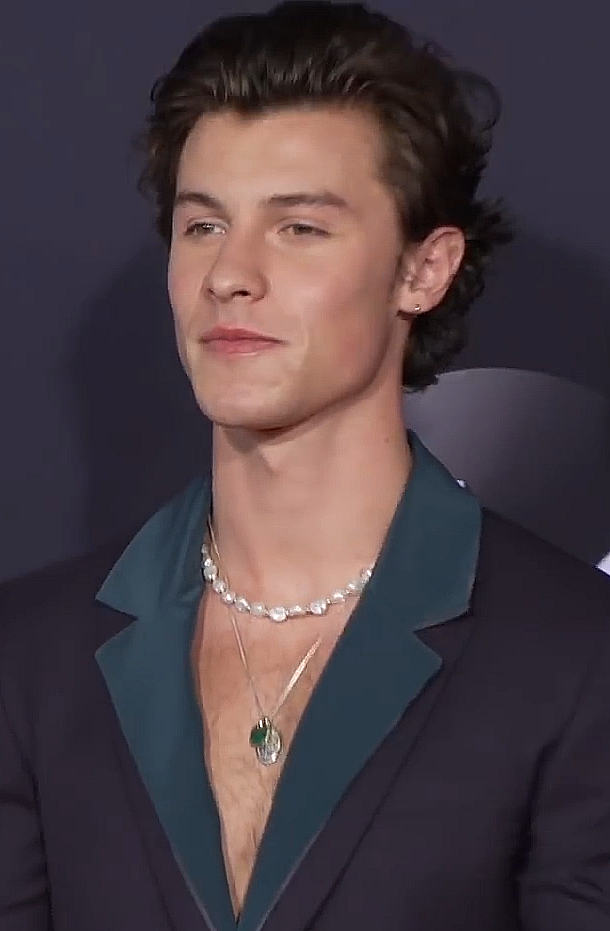
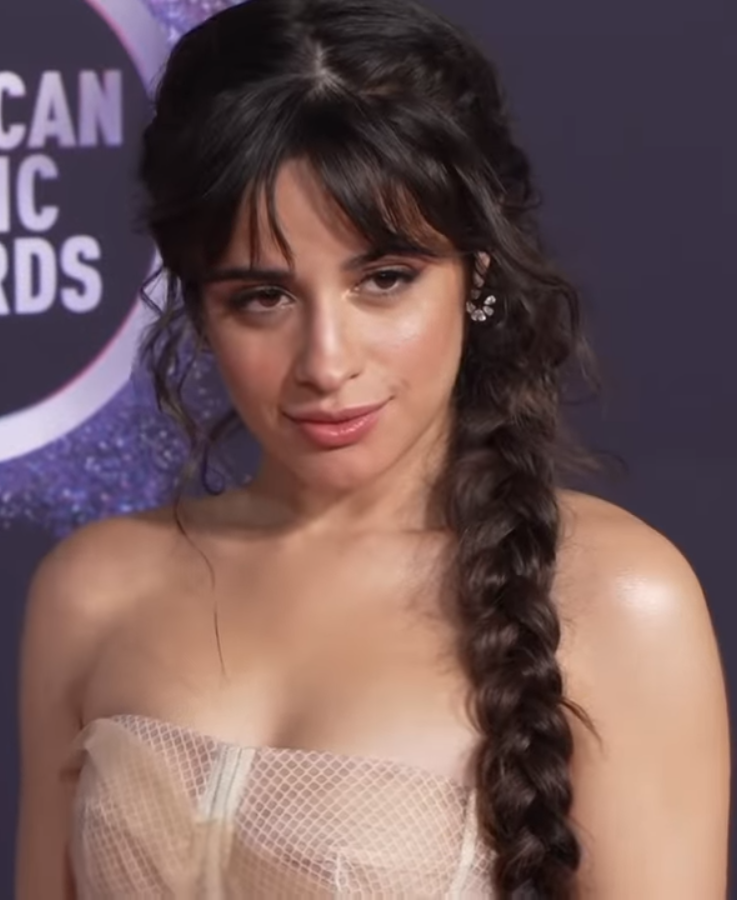
Shawn Mendes and Camila Cabello topped the chart for 13 weeks with "Señorita", the longest-running number-one song of the year.

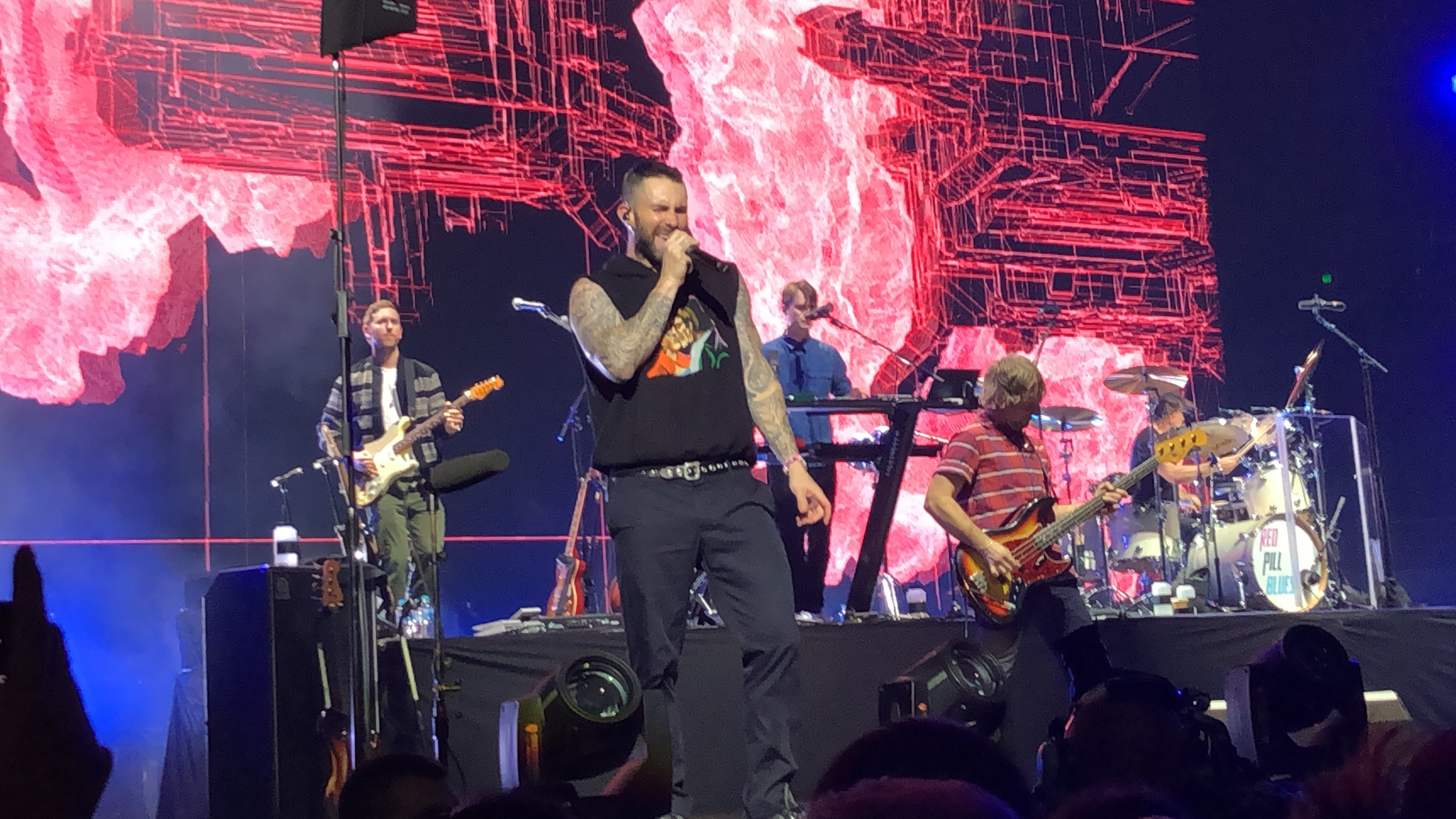
Maroon 5 topped the chart for 9 weeks with "Memories".

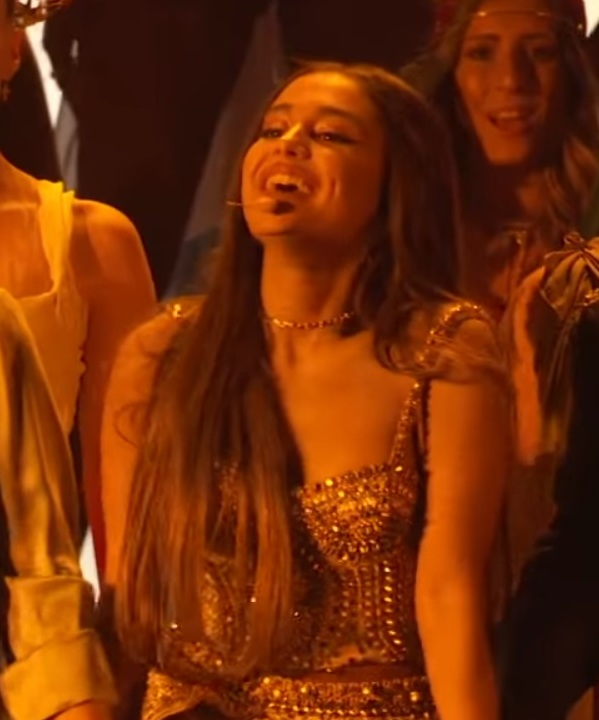
Ariana Grande topped the chart for 6 weeks with "7 Rings".

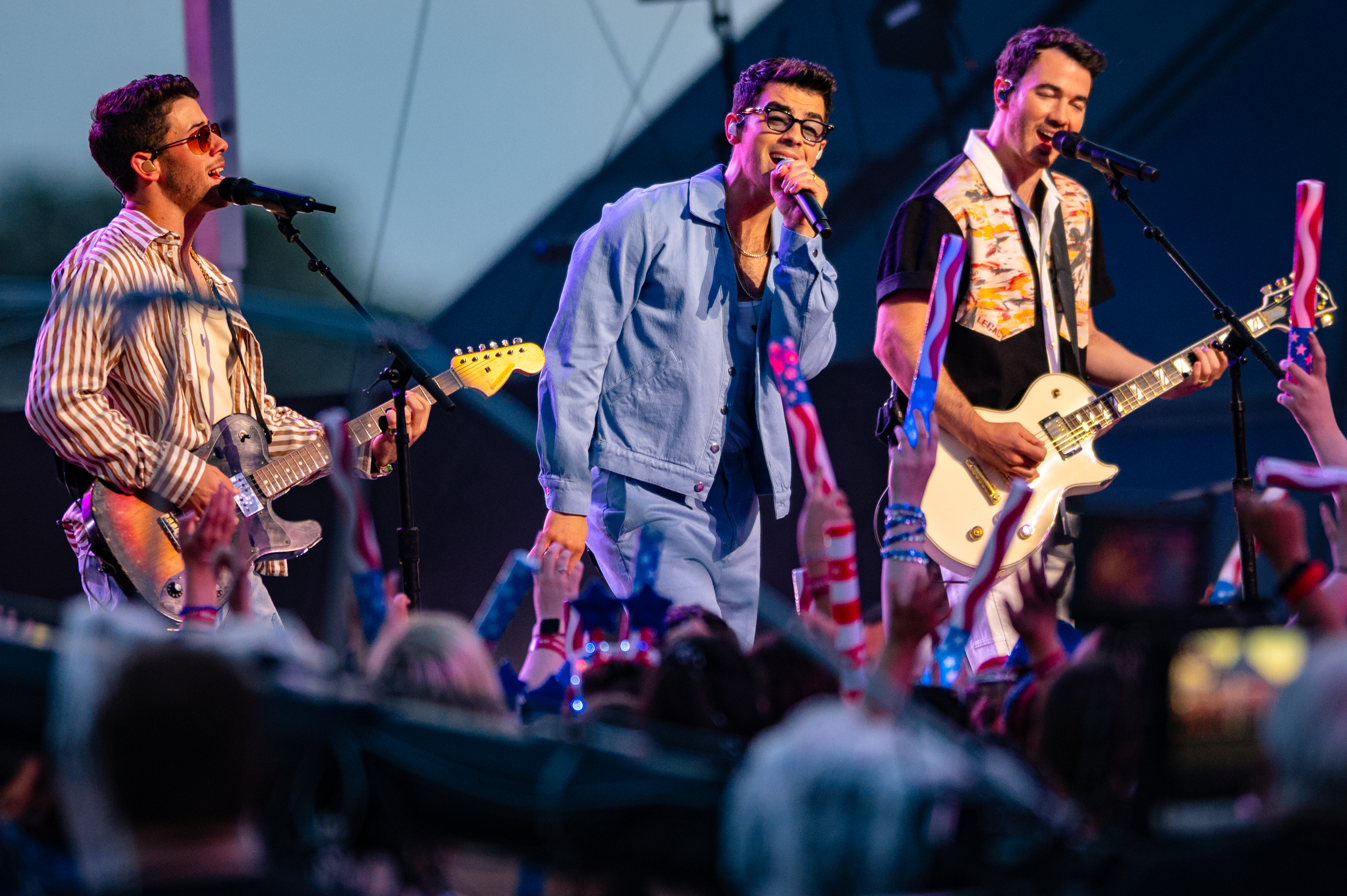
Jonas Brothers topped the chart for 4 weeks with "Sucker".

Issue Date	Song	Artist(s)	Ref.
3 January	"A Kind of Sorrow"	A-Lin	
10 January	"A Kind of Sorrow"	A-Lin	
17 January	"A Kind of Sorrow"	A-Lin	
24 January	"7 Rings"	Ariana Grande	
31 January	"7 Rings"	Ariana Grande	
7 February	"7 Rings"	Ariana Grande	
14 February	"7 Rings"	Ariana Grande	
21 February	"7 Rings"	Ariana Grande	
28 February	"7 Rings"	Ariana Grande	
7 March	"Sucker"	Jonas Brothers	
14 March	"Sucker"	Jonas Brothers	
21 March	"Sucker"	Jonas Brothers	
28 March	"Sucker"	Jonas Brothers	
27 June	"Señorita"	Shawn Mendes and Camila Cabello	
4 July	"Señorita"	Shawn Mendes and Camila Cabello	
11 July	"Señorita"	Shawn Mendes and Camila Cabello	
18 July	"Señorita"	Shawn Mendes and Camila Cabello	
25 July	"Señorita"	Shawn Mendes and Camila Cabello	
1 August	"Señorita"	Shawn Mendes and Camila Cabello	
8 August	"Señorita"	Shawn Mendes and Camila Cabello	
15 August	"Señorita"	Shawn Mendes and Camila Cabello	
22 August	"Señorita"	Shawn Mendes and Camila Cabello	
29 August	"Señorita"	Shawn Mendes and Camila Cabello	
5 September	"Señorita"	Shawn Mendes and Camila Cabello	
12 September	"Señorita"	Shawn Mendes and Camila Cabello	
19 September	"Won't Cry"	Jay Chou and Ashin	
26 September	"Won't Cry"	Jay Chou and Ashin	
3 October	"Won't Cry"	Jay Chou and Ashin	
10 October	"Señorita"	Shawn Mendes and Camila Cabello	
17 October	"Memories"	Maroon 5	
24 October	"Memories"	Maroon 5	
31 October	"Memories"	Maroon 5	
7 November	"Memories"	Maroon 5	
14 November	"Memories"	Maroon 5	
21 November	"Memories"	Maroon 5	
28 November	"Memories"	Maroon 5	
5 December	"Memories"	Maroon 5	
12 December	"Memories"	Maroon 5	
19 December	"Dance Monkey"	Tones and I	
26 December	"Dance Monkey"	Tones and I	

== Number-one artists ==
List of number-one artists by total weeks at number one
Position	Artist	Weeks at No. 1
1	Shawn Mendes	13
1	Camila Cabello	13
2	Maroon 5	9
3	Ariana Grande	6
4	Jonas Brothers	4
5	A-Lin	3
5	Jay Chou	3
5	Ashin	3
6	Tones and I	2
