= Rhea Raj =

American singer-songwriter (born 2000)

- Raj in 2023
- Born: Rhea Sri Rajagopalan; April 5, 2000 (age 26); Stamford, Connecticut, U.S.
- Education: NYU Tisch
- Occupations: Singer; songwriter; producer
- Relatives: Lara Raj (sister)
- Musical career
- Genres: Pop; electropop
- Instrument: Vocals
- Years active: 2016–present
- Labels: Hybe UMG; Republic
- Website: rhearaj.com

Rhea Sri Rajagopalan (born April 5, 2000), known professionally as Rhea Raj, is an American singer and songwriter. She released her first EP, Hunter, in 2024, followed by her EP, COMMOTION, in 2025. In September 2026, Rhea announced that she signed a joint venture deal between Republic Records and Hybe UMG.

== Early life ==
Raj was born on April 5, 2000, in Stamford, Connecticut, in the United States, to Tamil immigrants, Kavita and Srivastan Rajagopalan. She grew up in Dallas, Texas. Her mother ran a Bharatnatyam dance school and her father worked in digital marketing. At two years old, she began learning classical Indian dance. She began singing when she was 10 years old, and began writing songs and producing on Logic Pro when she was 11 years old. She has a younger sister, Lara Raj (of Katseye), who is also a singer.

== Career ==
=== 2016: American Idol ===
Raj appeared in the fifteenth season of American Idol in 2016. She progressed from the audition stage but failed to pass the Hollywood Week round.

=== 2018–present: Solo career ===
In 2018, Raj started college at New York University Tisch School of the Arts' Clive Davis Institute of Recorded Music where she met Jacob Kasher Hindlin. She later signed with Hindlin's publishing company, Livelihood Music Company, for representation as a writer and producer.

In 2020, she was selected by BMI to receive the Abe Olman Scholarship Award from the Songwriters Hall of Fame.

In 2023, Raj was selected as the Spotify x Gold House Artist of the Year.

In 2024, Raj released her debut studio album, Hunter, and a stripped down version, Hunter (Tamed edition). In 2025, Raj released her follow-up EP, Commotion. Its lead single "Haute Couture" with Aliyah's Interlude received a Fortnite emote. She performed "Haute Couture" alongside Aliyah's Interlude at Lollapalooza in 2025. Later that year, Raj went on her first headlining tour to promote the EP.

In January 2026, Raj became the first artist signed to 5 Junction Management, a subsidiary of Warner Music Group led by DesiHits founder Anjula Acharia.

In September 2026, she joined Hybe UMG and Republic Records, this being the first joint-venture deal between the two.

Rhea attended the 2026 Victoria's Secret Fashion Show where her unreleased single "DREAMGIRL" made its global debut during the Pink Halftime segment. In October 2026, Raj was announced to perform at the inaugural international edition of the Weverse Con Festival in India in 2027.

== Discography ==
Extended plays

- Hunter (2024)
- Commotion (2025)

Singles

- "MVP" (2021)
- "Venom" (2021)
- "In Ur Hands" (2021)
- "Outside" (2022)
- "Taste That (Mwah)" (2023)
- "Atmosphere" (2023)
- "OUT OF BODY" (2023)
- "MESSY" (2024)
- "HUSH" (2024)
- "DIGITAL BABE" (2024)
- "PRAY ON IT" (Feat Talwiinder & Yung Raja) (2025)
- "Haute Couture" (with Aliyah's Interlude) (2025)
- "Mumbai" (2025)
- "Haute Couture with Aliyah's Interlude (Slush Puppy Remix)" (2025)
- "Killer" (2025)

Features (tracks Rhea features on)

- "fw me(dirty)" Knock2 (2025)

Songwriting Credits
Year	Artist	Album	Song
2025	Knock2 and Rhea Raj		
2025	Rhea Raj and Aliyah's Interlude		"Haute Couture"
2025	Maroon 5 featuring Lisa	Love Is Like	"Priceless"
