= David Dobkin (director) =

American film director, producer and screenwriter

- Born: June 23, 1969 (age 57); Washington D.C., U.S.
- Occupations: Film director; film producer; screenwriter; composer
- Spouse: Megan Wolpert
- Children: 2
- Relatives: Jay Wolpert (Father in law)
- Writing career
- Years active: 1992–present
- Genre: Comedy
- Notable works: Shanghai Knights; Wedding Crashers; The Judge; Eurovision Song Contest: The Story of Fire Saga

David Dobkin (born 23 June 1969) is an American director, producer and screenwriter. He is best known for directing the films Clay Pigeons, Shanghai Knights, Wedding Crashers, The Judge, and Eurovision Song Contest: The Story of Fire Saga.

== Early life ==
Dobkin was born on 23 June 1969 in Washington, D.C., where he attended Lafayette Elementary School, and later was raised in the suburb of Bethesda, Maryland, where he attended Walt Whitman High School.

== Career ==
Dobkin made his music-video debut with video clips for rapper Tupac Shakur. Fifteen more videos followed for such music groups as Extreme, Robin Zander, Sonic Youth, dada, Blues Traveler, and others. Dobkin's music-video credits include George Thorogood's "One Bourbon, One Scotch, One Beer," Elton John's "You Can Make History", and Coolio's "1, 2, 3, 4". Dobkin also collaborated with band Maroon 5 in their music videos "Sugar", "Girls Like You", "Memories" and "Middle Ground" and an untitled documentary film. As of March 2026, no further announcement about the documentary film has been made.

After shooting television commercials, Dobkin broke into feature films with Clay Pigeons, for Scott Free, the first film produced at Ridley and Tony Scott's production company that they did not direct. The black comedy about a series of small-town murders starred Vince Vaughn, Joaquin Phoenix and Janeane Garofalo, and was distributed by Gramercy Pictures. Dobkin next directed the comedies Shanghai Knights (2003), starring Jackie Chan and Owen Wilson, and Wedding Crashers (2005), with Wilson and Vaughn.

Through his production company Big Kid Pictures, Dobkin both produced and directed Fred Claus (2007), starring Vaughn and Paul Giamatti, and The Change-Up (2011), starring Ryan Reynolds and Jason Bateman. He co-wrote and was an executive producer of the film adaptation of Dark Horse Comics' R.I.P.D. (2013), Dobkin directed 2014's The Judge, starring Robert Downey Jr. and Robert Duvall.

== Filmography ==
=== Film ===
Short film

Year	Title	Director	Executive Producer
1992	52nd St. Serenade	Yes	No
2005	The Ropes	No	Yes

Feature film

Year	Title	Director	Producer	Writer
1995	Ice Cream Man	No	No	Yes
1998	Clay Pigeons	Yes	No	No
2003	Shanghai Knights	Yes	No	No
2005	Wedding Crashers	Yes	No	No
2007	Mr. Woodcock	Uncredited	Yes	No
2007	Fred Claus	Yes	Yes	No
2011	The Change-Up	Yes	Yes	No
2012	Last Call	No	Executive	No
2013	Jack the Giant Slayer	No	Yes	Story
2013	R.I.P.D.	No	Executive	Story
2014	The Judge	Yes	Yes	Story
2015	Vacation	No	Yes	No
2015	The Man from U.N.C.L.E.	No	Executive	No
2017	King Arthur: Legend of the Sword	No	Executive	Story
2020	Eurovision Song Contest: The Story of Fire Saga	Yes	No	No
2023	Under the Boardwalk	No	Yes	Story

Documentary appearances

- Lennon or McCartney (2014)
- Here's to Life: The Story of the Refreshments (2017)

=== Television ===
Year(s)	Title	Director	Executive Producer	Notes
1995	Love Street	Yes	No	Episode: "Freudian Slip"
2005	2005 MTV Movie Awards	Yes	No	Segment: "Crashers"
2011	Friends with Benefits	Yes	Yes	Director (episode "Pilot") / Producer (13 episodes)
2013	The Gabriels	No	Yes	TV movie
2015–2019	Into the Badlands	Yes	Yes	Director (3 episodes) / Executive Producer (32 episodes)
2018	Iron Fist	Yes	Yes	Episode: "The Fury of Iron Fist"
2018	Sugar	Yes	Yes	Director (2 episodes) / Executive Producer (8 episodes)
2019–2022	Green Eggs and Ham	No	Yes	23 episodes (also directing consultant)
2021–2025	Resident Alien	Yes	Yes	Director (episode: "Pilot") / Executive Producer
2025	Stick	Yes	No	Director (2 episodes)

=== Music videos ===
Title	Year	Artist(s)	Notes	Ref.
1993	"Angry Youth"	Asphalt Ballet		
1993	"Keep Ya Head Up"	Tupac featuring Dave Hollister		
1993	"I Get Around"	Tupac featuring Shock G and Money-B		
1993	"Defense & Desire"	Blues Traveler		
1994	"All I Am"	Dada		
1994	"I Don't Know Where It Came From"	Ride		
1994	"Street Life"	Intelligent Hoodlum		
1995	"Hip Today"	Extreme		
1995	"Bus Stops"	The Nonce		
1995	"One Bourbon, One Scotch, One Beer"	John Lee Hooker		
1996	"You Can Make History (Young Again)"	Elton John		
1996	"1, 2, 3, 4 (Sumpin' New)"	Coolio		
1996	"Just the Two of Us"	Toshinobu Kubota featuring Caron Wheeler		
1996	"Like Marvin Gaye Said (What's Going On)"	Speech		
1996	"Banditos"	The Refreshments		
1998	"Boogie King"	The Screamin' Cheetah Wheelies		
1998	"I Got You Babe"	Merril Bainbridge featuring Shaggy		
2015	"Sugar"	Maroon 5		
2016	"Don't Wanna Know"	Maroon 5		
2018	"Girls Like You"	Maroon 5 featuring Cardi B	Original, Volume 2 and Vertical Video versions	
2019	"Memories"	Maroon 5		
2020	"Nobody's Love"	Maroon 5		
2023	"Middle Ground"	Maroon 5		

=== Commercials ===
Dobkin has directed commercials for clients such as ESPN, Heineken (which earned him honors from SHOOT magazine), Carl's Jr., Coke, Honda, Coors Light and Sony PlayStation (which won a Bronze Lion at Cannes). His spots for the Utah Symphony were named "Spot of the Month" by Adweek Magazine and featured as the year's best in Communication Arts Magazine.
