= Genesis (Raye song) =

2024 single by Raye

Single by Raye
- Released: 7 June 2024
- Recorded: 2023–2024
- Genre: R&B; jazz; hip hop; big band; gospel
- Length: 7:00
- Label: Human Re Sources
- Songwriters: Rachel Keen; Marvin Hemmings
- Producers: Raye; Rodney Jerkins; Shankar Ravindran; Tom Richards

Raye singles chronology
"Worth It" (2023)	"Genesis" (2024)	"Moi" (2024)

Music video
- "Genesis" on YouTube

"Genesis" is a song by the British singer-songwriter Raye. She co-wrote it with Marvin Hemmings and produced it with Rodney Jerkins, Shankar Ravindran, and Tom Richards. The song was first performed at the 44th edition of the Brit Awards and was teased on season 49 of the American television show Saturday Night Live. Before its official title was announced on 17 May 2024, media publications and fans referred to the song as "Let There Be Light". It was released independently by Human Re Sources on 7 June 2024, with a music video co-directed by Raye and Otis Dominique premiering on the same date.

Developed over two years, "Genesis" is structured into three acts in which Raye experiments with various genres, including jazz, R&B, hip hop, gospel music, and pop. The lyrics address social and personal problems such as depression, exhaustion, and anxiety, while also conveying themes of hope. The song received positive reviews from music critics and was added to year-end lists of best music. Its video was nominated for an MTV Video Music Award. Raye included "Genesis" in the regular set list of the My 21st Century Blues Tour in 2024 and performed it at several events. Commercially, it peaked at number twenty two on the UK singles chart.

== Background ==
Raye began working on "Genesis" in 2022, months before the release of her debut studio album, My 21st Century Blues (2023). She expressed that she had "scrutinized, replaced, remade, and passionately sculpted" the song to be the way she imagined it. The singer is passionate about the song, and feels like "it deserved all the time that was spent on it". After receiving a mixed response from her management about the length of the track, Raye still wanted to release it as it was; she stated: "This is about art, if it was about selling music ... then I would not have made it [this way]."

At the 2024 Brit Awards, Raye broke the record for most wins (six) and nominations (seven) for an artist in a single year. At the ceremony, she performed a medley of four songs: "Ice Cream Man", "Prada", "Escapism", and the then-untitled song. In the first months of the year, Raye included "Genesis" on the regular set list of her fourth concert tour, the My 21st Century Blues Tour. On 6 April 2024, during season 49 of the American television show Saturday Night Live, Raye also performed the track, which media publications had referred to as "Let There Be Light".

== Release ==
The singer announced the release of "Genesis" as a single on her social media on 17 May 2024, along with its official title and the confirmation of the release date. She shared a photo of the 7-inch single and wrote: "It kind of hurts a bit to call this piece of music a 'single' because it is so much more than just a song to me". On 3 June, Raye hosted the Genesis Exhibition, a pop-up exhibition in New York City to promote the song; at the event, she said that she was proud of "Genesis", on which she "worked so hard". Days later, she also posted a snippet of the music video. Shortly before "Genesis" was released, Raye performed it on the Selhurst railway station platform in London, accompanied by a live band. The track was released independently on 7 June 2024, via Human Re Sources, and was sent to Italian airplay in parallel. It was promoted to US rhythmic contemporary radio in the same month. The music video was also published; it was co-directed by Raye and Otis Dominique, and recorded in around seven days. A live version of "Genesis" was included on Raye's live album Live at Montreux Jazz Festival, released on 13 September 2024; it featured content recorded at the Montreux Jazz Festival in Switzerland.

== Music and lyrics ==
"Genesis" is a seven-minute song structured into three acts, in which Raye experiments with different genres and sounds. She said that she had "so much" that she wanted to say on the track. Raye wrote "Genesis" with Marvin Hemmings, and produced it with Rodney Jerkins, Shankar Ravindran, and Tom Richards. The overall lyrics discuss issues of body image, social pressures, and a yearning for validation, along with other themes. In a statement, Raye expressed that she hopes that it "will be able to bring some hope, the way this music does for [her], to those who need it most". She had a quote from Nina Simone in mind while creating the record: "An artist's duty, as far as I'm concerned, is to reflect the times." She said that it is "such a deep, heavy, powerful, important, burdening, and overwhelming but important quote." The title of the song reflects changes and references the Book of Genesis.

The gospel-tinged first part of the track deals with sobriety, a part of the lyrics that Raye followed with: "But I can feel the demons waiting on my downfall / Since I'm so ugly and irrelevant." It contains harmonies and sweeping strings. The second part includes jazz, R&B, hip hop, and elements of pop music. It contains a dramatic, dark brass section. "Genesis" concludes with a repetition of the plea of "Let there be light" over a jazz and big band instrumental.

== Critical reception ==
Upon its release, "Genesis" received positive reviews. Some critics lauded Raye's vocal performance, including Consequence's Mary Siroky and Clash's Sophie Harman; while giving the song a rating of 8 out of 10, the latter highlighted the balance between "her fragility and resilience" and said that her exploration of mental health and body image resonates with listeners. Siroky also admired the transition between the second and third part, that "very few artists could execute". Several reviewers described the song as a standout release. Andrew Unterberger of Billboard included it on his list of the must-hear releases of the week, and perceived it as opposite to the pop of "Escapism". Abbie Reynolds of Capital named "Genesis" a "huge moment in music history", and compared it to when the British band Queen released their six-minute song "Bohemian Rhapsody". Jenesaispop's Jordi Bardají called "Genesis" the most ambitious composition of Raye's musical career, and described it as epic and historic. In December 2024, Business Insider and Rolling Stone added "Genesis" to their lists of the best songs of the year, placing it at number five and sixteen, respectively. Billboard named it one of the best songs of 2024 from the UK and Ireland.

== Accolades ==
The music video for "Genesis" received three nominations at the 2024 UK Music Video Awards for Best Pop Video – UK, Best Performance in a Video, and Best Cinematography in a Video. It also competed for Video for Good at the 2024 MTV Video Music Awards, but ultimately lost to Billie Eilish's "What Was I Made For?". At the 2025 ceremony, it has been nominated for Video of the Year at the MOBO Awards.

== Commercial performance ==
Upon its release, "Genesis" peaked at number 22 and 53 on the national charts in the United Kingdom and Ireland, respectively. In the former country, it also reached the top five on the Hip Hop and R&B Singles Chart and the Independent Singles Chart. The song peaked at number 20 on New Zealand Hot Singles, and within the top 40 in two Billboard charts in the United States, Pop Airplay and Rhythmic.

== Track listing ==
- Digital EP
1. "Genesis" – 7:00
2. "Genesis, pt. I" – 1:16
3. "Genesis, pt. II" – 3:28
4. "Genesis, pt. III" – 2:22
5. "Genesis" (Live at Montreux Jazz Festival) – 7:15
- 7-inch
1. "Genesis"
2. "Genesis" (Instrumental)

== Charts ==
Chart performance for "Genesis"
Chart (2024)	Peak position
Ireland (IRMA)	53
New Zealand Hot Singles (RMNZ)	20
UK Singles (Official Charts)	22
UK Hip Hop/R&B (Official Charts)	4
UK Indie (Official Charts)	3
US Pop Airplay (Billboard)	39
US Rhythmic Airplay (Billboard)	30

== Release history ==
Release dates and formats for "Genesis"
Region	Date	Format(s)	Label	Ref.
Various	7 June 2024	7-inch single; digital download; streaming	Human Re Sources	
Italy	7 June 2024	Radio airplay	Human Re Sources	
