= Jordi (album) =

Studio album by Maroon 5
- Released: June 11, 2021
- Recorded: 2019 – March 2021
- Studios: 12 Palms (Los Angeles); Westlake Beverly (Los Angeles); Madison Club (Palm Springs); M&S (Los Angeles); Gumbo (New Orleans); Conway (Los Angeles); The She Shed (Los Angeles); Rock a Little (Los Angeles); Electric Feels (West Hollywood); Orange Grove (Hollywood); EastWest (Los Angeles); Marathon (Los Angeles); 4Hunnid Records (Los Angeles)
- Genres: Pop; pop rap; R&B
- Length: 37:45
- Labels: 222; Interscope; Polydor
- Producers: Beam; Louis Bell; Blackbear; Boi-1da; Nathan Butts; Cirkut; John DeBold; Dutchboi; Mikky Ekko; Andrew Goldstein; KBeaZy; Kid Bloom; Don Mills; The Monsters & Strangerz; Noah "Mailbox" Passovoy; Gabe Simon; Blake Slatkin; Jahaan Sweet; Andrew Watt

Maroon 5 chronology
| Red Pill Blues (2017) | Jordi (2021) | Love Is Like (2025) |

Singles from Jordi
- 1. "Memories" Released: September 20, 2019; 2. "Nobody's Love" Released: July 24, 2020; 3. "Beautiful Mistakes" Released: March 3, 2021; 4. "Lost" Released: June 11, 2021

Jordi (stylized in all caps) is the seventh studio album by American band Maroon 5. It was released on June 11, 2021, through 222, Interscope and Polydor Records. The album features guest appearances from Megan Thee Stallion, Blackbear, Stevie Nicks, Bantu, H.E.R., YG, and late rappers Juice Wrld and Nipsey Hussle. The deluxe edition of the album features additional guest appearances from Anuel AA, Tainy, and Jason Derulo.

It is the band's first album in four years since Red Pill Blues (2017), and also their first album without longtime bassist Mickey Madden following his arrest in 2020, due to domestic violence (though some of his contributions are heard from tracks 10–13).

The album is titled after a nickname of the band's late manager Jordan Feldstein, who died in 2017. The album received negative reviews from critics.

== Background ==
One month after the release of Red Pill Blues in November 2017, the band's manager and Adam Levine's childhood friend Jordan Feldstein died of a pulmonary embolism aged 40. Feldstein was the older brother of actors Jonah Hill and Beanie Feldstein. Two years later, the band dedicated the song "Memories" to him. The song went on to become a worldwide success—it is the first single released from the album and it appears on the track listing in two versions (alongside the original version of the song, the album also includes a remix, featuring American rappers Nipsey Hussle and YG). The album was recorded between 2019 and 2021 (prior to and during the COVID-19 pandemic).

On April 29, 2021, the band announced the album and was available for pre-order on the same day. The track listing for the deluxe edition was announced on May 24, 2021.

== Singles ==
The album was promoted by four singles. The first single, "Memories", was released on September 20, 2019. The song debuted at number 22 on the Billboard Hot 100, later peaking at number 2 and becoming the band's tenth top-5 single, as well as their fifteenth top-10 single. The second single, "Nobody's Love", was released on July 24, 2020. The song was inspired by the COVID-19 pandemic and the George Floyd protests. It peaked at 41 and 119 on the US Billboard Hot 100 and Billboard Global 200, respectively.

The third single, "Beautiful Mistakes", a collaboration with American rapper Megan Thee Stallion, was released on March 3, 2021, along with a lyric video featuring a style inspired by comic books. The official music video was released on March 11, 2021, and was directed by Sophie Muller. The song peaked at 13 and 26 on the US Billboard Hot 100 and Global 200, respectively. The fourth and final single, "Lost", was released alongside the album on June 11, 2021, along with an official music video. The album's only promotional single, "Lovesick", was sent to Italian radio on January 7, 2022.

=== Other songs ===
"Lifestyle" (a Jason Derulo song featuring Adam Levine) was announced by Jason Derulo on January 17, 2021, on his social media accounts, and it was made available for pre-order. The song was expected to be released on an upcoming album from him, but was instead put as a bonus track on Jordi. The song would later be featured on Derulo's 2024 album Nu King.

Musician Bantu released a remix version of the album's song "One Light" on August 5, 2022, with the band and featuring artists Yung Bleu and Latto.

== Critical reception ==
Professional ratings
Aggregate scores
| Source | Rating |
|---|---|
| AnyDecentMusic? | 3.6/10 |
| Metacritic | 48/100 |
Review scores
| Source | Rating |
| The Arts Desk | 1/5 stars |
| Clash | 2.5/5 stars |
| Evening Standard | 2/5 stars |
| The Guardian | 2/5 stars |
| i | 2/5 stars |
| The Independent | 2/5 stars |
| NME | 3/5 stars |
| Pitchfork | 4.7/10 |
| Rolling Stone | 2.5/5 stars |
| Sputnikmusic | 1/5 stars |

Jordi received negative reviews from critics. On aggregator Metacritic, which assigns a normalised rating out of 100 to reviews from mainstream critics, the album has an average score of 48 out of 100, based on 9 reviews. It garnered "mixed to average reviews"; this is the lowest score of any the 381 albums listed on Metacritic from 2021.

Writing for NME, El Hunt reported that, with Jordi, Maroon 5 were "more visible, and, at times, vulnerable", describing the two versions of "Memories" as "sharp pop songs with both substance and heart". Talking about the collaborations, Hunt detailed that Stevie Nicks' contribution to "Remedy" sounded like "a corrupted Siri singing country-western", and described Jason Derulo's collaboration with Levine, "Lifestyle," as "silly" and "slightly overdone". She remarked that the addition of Juice Wrld on "Can't Leave You Alone" "serves little purpose", and that his verse is "wedged into the middle of an otherwise unremarkable break-up song".

In a negative review, Kate Solomon of i described the songs on the album as "generic but hypnotic melodies over generic but danceable beats", saying that the songs were "banal" and "advertisement-friendly". While Solomon highlighted the inclusion of H.E.R. and Megan Thee Stallion, she described the posthumous appearances by Nipsey Hussle and Juice Wrld as "unmemorable". Solomon remarked that the album is "perfectly crafted to please crowds, to slip into your consciousness without you really realising". In a similar review, The Guardian's Alexis Petridis described the album as "a plethora of well-worn 21st-century pop tropes – tropical house sounds, post-Tame Impala floaty synths – but nothing you would describe as novel in the music or lyrics". He likened Maroon 5 to a blank canvas, saying that the band was "reliant on guest artists to inject personality and songwriters and producers to come up with the goods". He highlighted Bantu and Thee Stallion's contributions, describing them as "fiery" and "a surprise", respectively, but described the rest of the album as a "mixed bag", and remarked that the songs felt "too calculated for their own good".

== Commercial performance ==
In the United States, Jordi debuted at number eight on the Billboard 200 with first week sales of 37,000 equivalent units, which consisted of 15,000 pure album sales, marking the group's lowest first week album sales. Despite this, it also marks the group's seventh top ten effort on the charts since their debut album Songs About Jane. As of June 22, 2021, the album has been certified gold by the Recording Industry Association of America (RIAA), for moving 500,000 units in the country alone.

== Track listing ==
Jordi – standard edition
| No. | Title | Writer(s) | Producer(s) | Length |
|---|---|---|---|---|
| 1. | "Beautiful Mistakes" (featuring Megan Thee Stallion) | Adam Levine; Matthew Musto; Andrew Goldstein; Joe Kirkland; Jacob Kasher Hindlin; Megan Pete | Andrew Goldstein; Blackbear; Noah "Mailbox" Passovoy^{[v]} | 3:47 |
| 2. | "Lost" | Levine; Jonathan Bellion; Michael Pollack; Jordan K. Johnson; Stefan Johnson; Hindlin; Alexander "Eskeerdo" Izquierdo | The Monsters & Strangerz^{[m]}; Gian Stone^{[v]}; Passovoy^{[v]} | 2:52 |
| 3. | "Echo" (featuring Blackbear) | Levine; Musto; Jake Torrey; Pollack; Sam Romans; Henry Walter | Cirkut; Pollack^{[a]}; Passovoy^{[v]}; Goldstein^{[g]} | 2:58 |
| 4. | "Lovesick" | Levine; Mikky Ekko; Gabe Simon; Goldstein; Hindlin | Ekko; Simon; Goldstein^{[m]}; Passovoy^{[v]} | 3:05 |
| 5. | "Remedy" (featuring Stevie Nicks) | Levine; Brittany "Starrah" Hazzard; Matthew Samuels; Miloš Angelov; Jahaan Akil Sweet; John DeBold | Boi-1da; Sweet; Don Mills; DeBold^{[m]}; Passovoy^{[a]}^{[v]}; Stone^{[v]}; Stevie Nicks^{[g]} | 2:29 |
| 6. | "Seasons" | Levine; Tyshane Thompson; Giorgio Lorenzo Ligeon; Nathan Butts; Blake Slatkin; Keegan Bach; Tyree Hawkins | Slatkin; KBeazy; Beam; Dutchboi; Nathan Butts; Passovoy^{[v]} | 2:48 |
| 7. | "One Light" (featuring Bantu) | Levine; Tinashe Sibanda; Philip Kembo; Hindlin; Ant Clemons; Kirsten Urbas; Walter; Cameron Breithaupt; Miles Breithaupt | Cirkut; Cameron Bright^{[c]}; Father Moth^{[c]}; Passovoy^{[a]}^{[v]}; Bantu^{[g]} | 3:34 |
| 8. | "Convince Me Otherwise" (with H.E.R.) | Levine; Gabriella Wilson; Lennon Kloser; Walter; Hindlin; Jerry Edouard | Cirkut; Kid Bloom; Passovoy^{[a]}^{[v]}; H.E.R.^{[g]} | 3:07 |
| 9. | "Nobody's Love" | Levine; Hindlin; Pollack; Nija Charles; Kareen Lomax; Rosina Russell; S. Johnson; J. Johnson; Ryan Ogren; Brandon Hamlin | The Monsters & Strangerz^{[m]}; Ryan OG^{[a]}; German^{[a]}; BHam^{[a]}; Stone^{[v]}; Passovoy^{[v]} | 3:31 |
| 10. | "Can't Leave You Alone" (featuring Juice Wrld) | Levine; Jarad Higgins; Hindlin; Andrew Watt; Louis Bell | Watt; Bell^{[m]}; Passovoy^{[v]} | 3:16 |
| 11. | "Memories" | Levine; Bellion; Hindlin; Pollack; J. Johnson; S. Johnson; Vincent Ford | Levine; The Monsters & Strangerz^{[m]}; Stone^{[v]}; Passovoy^{[v]} | 3:09 |
| 12. | "Memories (remix)" (featuring Nipsey Hussle and YG) | Levine; Ermias Asghedom; Keenon Jackson; Hindlin; Bellion; Pollack; S. Johnson; J. Johnson; Ford | Levine; The Monsters & Strangerz^{[m]}; Stone^{[v]}; Passovoy^{[v]} | 3:09 |
| Total length: | | | | 37:45 |

Jordi – deluxe edition
| No. | Title | Writer(s) | Producer(s) | Length |
|---|---|---|---|---|
| 13. | "Button" (featuring Anuel AA and Tainy) | Levine; Emmanuel Gazmey Santiago; Marco Masís; Hindlin; Bellion; Pollack; Alejandro Borrero; Ivanni Rodríguez; Johnny Simpson; Ricardo Lopez | NEON16; Tainy; Passovoy^{[v]}; Halatrax^{[v]} | 2:44 |
| 14. | "Lifestyle" (featuring Jason Derulo) | Derulo; Levine; Amy Allen; Pablo Bowman; Casey Smith; Natalie Salomon; Kevin White; Michael Woods | Rice N' Peas | 2:33 |
| Total length: | | | | 43:02 |

=== Notes ===
- ^{^[m]} indicates a main and vocal producer
- ^{^[a]} indicates an additional producer
- ^{^[c]} indicates a co-producer
- ^{^[v]} indicates a vocal producer for Adam Levine
- ^{^[g]} indicates a vocal producer for the guest vocalist

== Personnel ==
Maroon 5

- Adam Levine – vocals (all tracks), guitars (9)
- James Valentine – guitars (1, 2, 4, 5, 7–13)
- Jesse Carmichael – guitars (5, 7–13), keyboards (7, 11–13)
- Matt Flynn – drums, percussion (5, 8, 10–13)
- PJ Morton – organ (4), keyboards (5–13)
- Sam Farrar – bass (5–7), additional vocals (5, 7), keyboards (11, 12)

Additional musicians

- Megan Thee Stallion – vocals (1)
- Matthew Musto – keyboards, programming (1); vocals (3)
- Andrew Goldstein – guitars, keyboards (1, 4); programming (4)
- Michael Pollack – backing vocals (2, 11, 12), additional vocals (9), keyboards (11, 12)
- Jon Bellion – backing vocals (2)
- The Monsters & Strangerz – programming (2, 9, 11, 12), instruments (2, 9)
- Cirkut – drum programming (3, 8), synthesizer (3)
- Gabe Simon – guitars, keyboards, programming, 5-string banjo, backing vocals, whistle (4)
- Mikky Ekko – guitars, keyboards, programming (4)
- John DeBold – drum programming, synthesizer programming, additional keyboards, additional guitar (5)
- Noah "Mailbox" Passovoy – percussion (5, 8, 13), keyboards (5, 10), additional vocals (5)
- Blake Slatkin – programming, guitar, drums, bass, additional vocals (6)
- KBeazy – programming, drums, keyboards (6)
- Bantu – vocals (7)
- H.E.R. – vocals (8)
- Jesse Perlman – guitars (8)
- Kid Bloom – additional vocals (8)
- Nija Charles – background vocals (9)
- Ryan Ogren – programming, instruments (9)
- German – programming, instruments (9)
- Pierre-Luc Rioux – guitars (9)
- Nija Charles – additional vocals (9)
- Mickey Madden – bass (10–13)
- Juice WRLD – vocals (10)
- Andrew Watt – guitars (10)
- Louis Bell – programming, keyboards (10)
- Nipsey Hussle – vocals (12)
- YG – vocals (12)
- Anuel AA – vocals (13)
- Tainy – vocals (13)
- Rob Gueringer – guitars (13)
- Jason Derulo – vocals (14)
- Rice N' Peas – programming (14)

Technical

- Randy Merrill – mastering
- Serban Ghenea – mixing
- Noah "Mailbox" Passovoy – engineering (all tracks), vocal engineering (14)
- Mikky Ekko – engineering (4)
- Gabe Simon – engineering (4)
- Reginald "ReggieNic" Nicholas – engineering (4)
- John DeBold – engineering (5)
- John Hanes – mix engineering
- Jaycen Joshua – vocal engineering for Megan Thee Stallion (1)
- Karen Johnston – vocal engineering for Stevie Nicks (5)
- Luis Bordeaux – vocal engineering for H.E.R. (8)
- Nick McMullen – vocal engineering for Kid Bloom (8)
- Ben Hogarth – vocal engineering (14)
- Sam Schamberg – engineering assistance (1–12, 14)
- Ashley Jacobson – engineering assistance (2)
- Eric Eylands – engineering assistance (5, 8)
- Bo Bodnar – engineering assistance (11, 12)
- Sam Schamberg – engineering assistance (11, 12, 14)
- Alejandro Baima – engineering assistance (13)
- John Armstrong – engineering assistance (13)
- Itai Schwartz – additional engineering (14)

Visuals

- Travis Schneider – art direction, design, packaging layout
- Sage Vaughn – art direction, design, cover art

== Charts ==
=== Weekly charts ===
Chart performance for Jordi
| Chart (2021–2024) | Peak position |
|---|---|
| Australian Albums (ARIA) | 11 |
| Austrian Albums (Ö3 Austria) | 33 |
| Belgian Albums (Ultratop Flanders) | 31 |
| Belgian Albums (Ultratop Wallonia) | 16 |
| Canadian Albums (Billboard) | 8 |
| Danish Albums (Hitlisten) | 18 |
| Dutch Albums (Album Top 100) | 25 |
| French Albums (SNEP) | 25 |
| German Albums (Offizielle Top 100) | 39 |
| Hungarian Physical Albums (MAHASZ) | 33 |
| Irish Albums (Official Charts) | 35 |
| Italian Albums (FIMI) | 40 |
| Japan Hot Albums (Billboard Japan) | 12 |
| Japanese Albums (Oricon) | 25 |
| Lithuanian Albums (AGATA) | 34 |
| New Zealand Albums (RMNZ) | 18 |
| Norwegian Albums (VG-lista) | 12 |
| Portuguese Albums (AFP) | 44 |
| Scottish Albums (Official Charts) | 46 |
| Spanish Albums (Promusicae) | 11 |
| Swiss Albums (Schweizer Hitparade) | 10 |
| UK Albums (Official Charts) | 19 |
| US Billboard 200 | 8 |

=== Year-end charts ===
Year-end chart performance for Jordi
| Chart (2021) | Position |
|---|---|
| US Billboard 200 | 180 |

== Certifications ==
Certifications for Jordi
| Region | Certification | Certified units/sales |
|---|---|---|
| Denmark (IFPI Danmark) | Gold | 10,000^{‡} |
| France (SNEP) | Gold | 50,000^{‡} |
| Italy (FIMI) | Gold | 25,000^{‡} |
| New Zealand (RMNZ) | Platinum | 15,000^{‡} |
| Poland (ZPAV) | Gold | 10,000^{‡} |
| Singapore (RIAS) | Platinum | 10,000^{*} |
| United States (RIAA) | Gold | 500,000^{‡} |
^{*} Sales figures based on certification alone.^{‡} Sales+streaming figures based on certification alone.

== Release history ==
Release history and details for Jordi
| Region | Date | Format | Edition | Label | Ref. |
|---|---|---|---|---|---|
| Various | June 11, 2021 | Digital download; streaming | Standard | 222; Interscope | |
| Australia | June 11, 2021 | CD | Standard | Interscope | |
| New Zealand | June 11, 2021 | CD | Standard | Interscope | |
| Various | December 17, 2021 | Vinyl | Limited | 222; Interscope; Polydor | |
