= Beautiful Mistakes =

2021 single by Maroon 5

Single by Maroon 5 featuring Megan Thee Stallion

from the album Jordi
- Released: March 3, 2021
- Genre: Pop; pop rap; pop rock
- Length: 3:50 (album version); 3:37 (lyric video/single version); 3:20 (radio edit)
- Label: 222; Interscope
- Songwriters: Adam Levine; Megan Pete; Jacob Kasher Hindlin; Joseph Kirkland; Andrew Goldstein; Matthew Musto
- Producers: Andrew Goldstein; Blackbear

Maroon 5 singles chronology
"Nobody's Love" (2020)	"Beautiful Mistakes" (2021)	"Lost" (2021)

Megan Thee Stallion singles chronology
"I'm a King" (2021)	"Beautiful Mistakes" (2021)	"Pop It" (2021)

Music video
- "Beautiful Mistakes" on YouTube

"Beautiful Mistakes" is a song by American band Maroon 5 featuring American rapper Megan Thee Stallion. It was released through 222 and Interscope Records on March 3, 2021, as the third single from the band's seventh studio album, Jordi (2021). The song was written by the band's lead singer Adam Levine, Megan Thee Stallion, Jacob Kasher Hindlin, Joe Kirkland, and producers Andrew Goldstein and Blackbear. The music video was directed by Sophie Muller.

== Composition ==
"Beautiful Mistakes" is a guitar-driven pop rock song with heavy drums and atmospheric synths and a tranquil beat. The song is written in the key of B-flat major with a tempo of 99 beats per minute. Thee Stallion delivers a slow and melodic verse, and switches from rapping to singing halfway through.

The little break where [Megan Thee Stallion goes] to the melodic thing, to be honest, it actually shows this new kind of branch of what she does, and this new versatility that she's going to show everybody right now. That's a side of her I had never really heard yet. [...] What she did was just miraculous, and it brought the song to a whole new level.

— Adam Levine on Megan showing off her versatility in "Beautiful Mistakes".

== Release and promotion ==
The song was revealed along with its title, cover art, and release date on February 22, 2021. The song was released on March 3, 2021, along with an accompanying lyric video featuring a style inspired by comic books. After the release of "Beautiful Mistakes", Maroon 5 team up with Randy's Donuts to create a limited edition of donuts based on the shop's appearance in the song's music video.

== Music video ==
The official music video premiered on MTV on March 11, 2021, and was directed by Sophie Muller. The video is set in a CGI/technicolor version of Los Angeles, which follows Adam Levine performing the song and walking across from the city alone, where he drives a 1974 Cadillac Eldorado and flies around through the sky, until Megan Thee Stallion arrives on the 1958 Lincoln Continental Mark III performing her rap as she joins Levine through the sunset, showering the city with donuts as the video ends.

== Reception ==
The song received mixed to negative reviews from critics. Variety included it in their list of the worst songs of 2021, saying that "this hookup between two of the M’s in the address book of music’s most eager-to-collaborate stars is evidence of the avalanche of pop/rap duets where both the performers and their characters don’t sound like they exist in the same universe".

== Live performances ==
On March 30, 2021, Maroon 5 performed "Beautiful Mistakes" for the first time in a virtual concert as part of the American Express Unstaged series. The band continued with the song live in Jimmy Kimmel Live! on April 21, 2021, and for the 3000th episode in season 18 of The Ellen DeGeneres Show on April 29, respectively. The band played "Beautiful Mistakes" for the season 20 finale of the reality show The Voice.

On June 14, 2021, Maroon 5 performed the song at the iHeartRadio Theater in Burbank, California, to commemorate the release of Jordi.

== Personnel ==
Credits adapted from Tidal.

- Adam Levine – lead vocals, songwriter
- Andrew Goldstein – songwriter, producer, guitar, keyboards, programming
- Jacob Kasher Hindlin – songwriter
- Joe Kirkland – songwriter
- Blackbear – songwriter, producer, keyboards, programming
- Megan Thee Stallion – featured vocals, songwriter
- James Valentine – guitar
- Serban Ghenea – engineer, mixer
- Noah "Mailbox" Passovoy – recording engineer, vocal producer
- Sam Schamberg – assistant recording engineer
- Shawn "Source" Jarrett – vocal engineer
- Randy Merrill – mastering engineer

== Charts ==
=== Weekly charts ===
Weekly chart performance for "Beautiful Mistakes"
Chart (2021)	Peak position
Argentina Hot 100 (Billboard)	66
Australia (ARIA)	36
Belgium (Ultratop 50 Flanders)	30
Belgium (Ultratop 50 Wallonia)	12
Brazil (Pop Internacional)	9
Canada Hot 100 (Billboard)	7
Canada AC (Billboard)	2
Canada CHR/Top 40 (Billboard)	2
Canada Hot AC (Billboard)	1
CIS Airplay (TopHit)	72
Croatia (HRT)	11
Czech Republic Airplay (ČNS IFPI)	78
Czech Republic Singles Digital (ČNS IFPI)	93
Denmark (Tracklisten)	39
France (SNEP)	38
Global 200 (Billboard)	24
Greece (IFPI)	63
Hungary (Single Top 40)	10
Iceland (Tónlistinn)	20
Ireland (IRMA)	36
Israel (Media Forest)	20
Italy (FIMI)	39
Italian Airplay (EarOne)	8
Japan Hot Overseas (Billboard)	4
Lebanon (Lebanese Top 20)	17
Lithuania (AGATA)	45
Malaysia (RIM)	20
Mexico Ingles Airplay (Billboard)	14
Netherlands (Dutch Tipparade 40)	1
Netherlands (Single Tip)	5
New Zealand (Recorded Music NZ)	21
Portugal (AFP)	69
Romania (Airplay 100)	24
San Marino (SMRRTV Top 50)	8
Singapore (RIAS)	14
Slovakia Airplay (ČNS IFPI)	31
Slovakia Singles Digital (ČNS IFPI)	57
Slovenia (SloTop50)	36
South Africa (RISA)	43
South Korea (Gaon)	111
Switzerland (Schweizer Hitparade)	52
UK Singles (Official Charts)	50
US Billboard Hot 100	13
US Adult Contemporary (Billboard)	7
US Adult Pop Airplay (Billboard)	1
US Dance Airplay (Billboard)	31
US Pop Airplay (Billboard)	10
US Rolling Stone Top 100	19
Venezuela (Record Report)	46

=== Monthly charts ===
Monthly chart performance for "Beautiful Mistakes"
Chart (2021)	Peak position
Paraguay (SGP)	100

=== Year-end charts ===
2021 year-end chart performance for "Beautiful Mistakes"
Chart (2021)	Position
Belgium (Ultratop Flanders)	99
Belgium (Ultratop Wallonia)	28
Canada (Canadian Hot 100)	12
Denmark (Tracklisten)	81
France (SNEP)	85
Global 200 (Billboard)	72
Portugal (AFP)	133
South Korea (Gaon)	195
Switzerland (Schweizer Hitparade)	87
US Billboard Hot 100	34
US Adult Contemporary (Billboard)	15
US Adult Top 40 (Billboard)	5
US Mainstream Top 40 (Billboard)	29

2022 year-end chart performance for "Beautiful Mistakes"
Chart (2022)	Position
Iceland (Tónlistinn)	99
US Adult Contemporary (Billboard)	13

== Certifications ==
Certifications and sales for "Beautiful Mistakes"
Region	Certification	Certified units/sales
Australia (ARIA)	3× Platinum	210,000^{‡}
Brazil (Pro-Música Brasil)	Diamond	160,000^{‡}
Canada (Music Canada)	Platinum	80,000^{‡}
Denmark (IFPI Danmark)	Platinum	90,000^{‡}
France (SNEP)	Diamond	333,333^{‡}
Italy (FIMI)	Platinum	70,000^{‡}
New Zealand (RMNZ)	2× Platinum	60,000^{‡}
Poland (ZPAV)	Gold	25,000^{‡}
Portugal (AFP)	Gold	5,000^{‡}
Switzerland (IFPI Switzerland)	Gold	10,000^{‡}
United Kingdom (BPI)	Gold	400,000^{‡}
United States (RIAA)	Platinum	1,000,000^{‡}
^{‡} Sales+streaming figures based on certification alone.

== Release history ==
Release history for "Beautiful Mistakes"
Region	Date	Format(s)	Label	Ref.
Various	March 3, 2021	Digital download; streaming	222; Interscope	
Australia	March 5, 2021	Contemporary hit radio	Universal	
Italy	March 5, 2021	Contemporary hit radio	Universal	
United States	March 8, 2021	Hot adult contemporary radio	222; Interscope	
United States	March 9, 2021	Contemporary hit radio	222; Interscope	
Russia	March 22, 2021	Contemporary hit radio	Universal	
