= Memories (Maroon 5 song) =

2019 single by Maroon 5

Single by Maroon 5

from the album Jordi
- Released: September 20, 2019
- Studio: EastWest (Hollywood, California)
- Genre: Reggae-pop
- Length: 3:09
- Label: 222; Interscope
- Songwriters: Adam Levine; Jonathan Bellion; Jacob Kasher Hindlin; Michael Pollack; Jordan K. Johnson; Stefan Johnson; Vincent Ford
- Producers: The Monsters & Strangerz; Adam Levine

Maroon 5 singles chronology
"Girls Like You" (2018)	"Memories" (2019)	"Nobody's Love" (2020)

Music video
- "Memories" on YouTube

"Memories" is a song by the American band Maroon 5, released through 222 and Interscope Records on September 20, 2019, as the lead single from the band's seventh studio album Jordi (2021).

Lyrically, the song pays homage to the memories of a loved one who has since passed. It divided critics, with many panning its production but others calling it "sweet"; it was listed as one of the worst songs of 2019 by Spin magazine. The song is harmonically based on "Canon in D" by German composer Johann Pachelbel. It was written by Maroon 5's lead singer Adam Levine, Stefan Johnson, Jordan Johnson, Michael Pollack, Jacob Kasher Hindlin, Jon Bellion, and Vincent Ford. Levine and the production team the Monsters and the Strangerz produced the song. The single peaked at number two on the US Billboard Hot 100 chart and at number one on the international music charts.

It is Maroon 5's final single with bassist Mickey Madden, who announced his departure from the band in 2020, following his arrest for alleged domestic violence.

== Background and release ==
The band's lead singer, Adam Levine, explained: "This song is for anyone who has ever experienced loss. In other words, this song is for all of us." The song is based on the loss of the band's manager and Levine's friend, Jordan Feldstein, who died in December 2017, from pulmonary embolism. According to guitarist, James Valentine: "It's a different kind of song for us…It's an important song for us. You know, we experienced some loss in the last couple of years. We lost our longtime manager, Jordan Feldstein. We heard the skeleton of this song and thought it matched where we were at." Valentine also addressed with the people from around the world who been affected by the COVID-19 pandemic, stated: "I think the message is so simple and pure, resonates with everybody. We've all lost people, and especially over the last couple of years [with COVID-19], I think it's just become more important for people."

In an interview on The Howard Stern Show, Levine said: "I needed this song", he continued: "In a world that's increasingly chaotic and crazy and angry in a lot of ways... rather than fight about things, it's nice to have a common ground and all of us have had loss... [It's about loss] and celebrate them too, which I think it's important".

"Memories" was released on September 20, 2019. Maroon 5 released four remixed versions of the song, featuring Dillon Francis on December 13, 2019, followed by Devault (December 16), Cut Copy (December 18), and a remix featuring American rappers Nipsey Hussle and YG (this remix is also included on the Jordi album, alongside the original version of "Memories"). A 7-inch vinyl single was released on Record Store Day (October 24, 2020), which includes the song, the Dillon Francis remix and a 20-page photo & lyric booklet.

== Composition ==
The song was written by Adam Levine, Stefan Johnson, Jordan Johnson, Michael Pollack, Jacob Kasher Hindlin, Jon Bellion and Vincent Ford, and produced by Levine and the Monsters and the Strangerz. The song is based on the harmonic sequence and melody of "Canon in D" by Johann Pachelbel.

== Critical reception ==
"Memories" generated a polarized reception from music critics. Rolling Stone India listed it among the worst songs of 2019. In The Guardian, Graeme Virtue was critical of the track's "trite" lyrics, and dismissed it as "fun-free dreck". Pitchfork's Dani Blum found the guitar line "cloying" and the take on tragedy "pallid". Evening Standard reviewer David Smyth called the song's use of "Canon in D Major" a "ghastly poaching". Jason Friedman of Paste derided it for being as "viscerally annoying" as the band's 2016 single "Don't Wanna Know". Spin listed "Memories" as one of the worst songs of 2019, describing it as "a replica of a replica of a replica, sticky with the residue of borrowed emotion but hollow of anything resembling its own".

In more enthusiastic reviews, Jon Dolan of Rolling Stone viewed the song as "a sweet, somber, genuinely felt ballad". Similarly, El Hunt of NME called it a "sharp pop song" with "substance and heart". Maeve McDermott of USA Today felt the track is "primed for end-of-summer nostalgia" and compared Levine's vocals to Sting.

== Chart performance ==
"Memories" debuted at number 22 on the Billboard Hot 100, and later peaked at number two behind Post Malone's "Circles" to become the band's 10th top-five track and 15th top-ten track, and is their most recent top-ten track to date. This made Maroon 5 only the second band (the other is the Rolling Stones) to have a top-two hit on the Hot 100 in three different decades (2000s, 2010s and 2020s). The song additionally peaked at number one on the Adult Top 40 chart, giving the band its fourteenth number one there, and at number one on the Adult Contemporary chart, where it remained for 20 weeks. At the end of 2020, "Memories" ranked at number eight on the Hot 100 year-end chart.

== Music videos ==
=== Official video ===
The official music video was released on October 8, 2019, on YouTube. Directed by David Dobkin and cinematographed by Jeff Cronenweth, this video is reminiscent of Sinéad O'Connor's music video for "Nothing Compares 2 U" (1990). The video shows Adam Levine close to the camera singing in front of a dark background. It ends with the words "For Jordi", which are a dedication to Feldstein. As of February 2024, the video has received over 1 billion views.

=== Lyric videos ===
An animated lyric video of the song was released on November 29, 2019, by the band's YouTube channel. Directed by Andrew S. Cohen and Ryan Kieffer and was created by the animated production studio Confidential Cartoon Studios. The lyric video starts in an attic with the Maroon 5 memory box to include a number of items referencing the band's music videos for other songs: mural ("Three Little Birds"), Union Flag ("Moves Like Jagger" featuring Christina Aguilera and "One More Night"), the microphone ("Moves Like Jagger"), bow tie ("Sugar", "Makes Me Wonder" and "What Lovers Do" featuring SZA), toast glasses ("She Will Be Loved", "Sunday Morning" and "Sugar"), scorpion ("Wait"), black leather jacket ("Misery"), cherry blossom trees ("This Love" and "Won't Go Home Without You"), blue turtle costume ("Don't Wanna Know"), the payphone ("Payphone" featuring Wiz Khalifa and "Wake Up Call"), white boxing gloves ("One More Night") and a red lollipop and butterfly ("What Lovers Do"), along with a collection of boxes. Scenes with the map of Los Angeles from the band's concerts and their tour bus. Other items in the video including an album cover art of the band's The Studio Albums (2016), The Voice drinking cup, Magic 8 Ball, electric guitar, two MTV awards features the Moon Man in Video Music Award and the trophy in Europe Music Award, a Grammy Award and iHeartRadio Music Award trophy, tickets and the letter M with a vertex logo from the band's colored stickers, a leon lighted of "V" from the band's fifth album and a collage of photos from when the band was known as Kara's Flowers, all together only inside a collection of items appeared from the box.

Another lyric video, which is the song's remix version by musician Dillon Francis, was released on his YouTube channel on December 13, 2019. It features a montage of home videos and pictures showing Francis' friend Noel Teacher Mor, with her family including her sister Kelly Teacher and more recent videos such as Francis and Noel are heading to various concerts from Coachella to Las Vegas in the United States. This video is dedicated to Noel, who died of cancer on September 30, 2019.

A third lyric video with another remix featuring Nipsey Hussle and YG and was animated by Michelle Renslo, Carolyn Knapp and Celina Bhandari from 1824. It was released on June 11, 2021, the day with the release of the album.

=== Other official videos ===
On September 25, 2019, another music video for the song titled "Made with Memories", was released exclusively on Apple Music. It shows a montage of photos with the young Levine and his family, as well as him with his friends are the members of the band and they performed on touring in the world with various concerts.

The band released a cover tribute video on December 29, 2019. This video contains more than 57 videos on YouTube, some are the song's cover versions and was performed by fans from around the world including artists: Allie Sherlock, Connor Ball (of the Vamps), J.Fla, Davina Michelle and Boyce Avenue.

== Live performances ==
Maroon 5 started performing "Memories" on the October 7, 2019, episode on The Ellen DeGeneres Show. Band members Levine and Valentine performed an acoustic version of the song on The Howard Stern Show. In December 2019, the band played the song on Red Pill Blues Tour, during the last remaining shows in Doha and Las Vegas. On February 1, 2020, Maroon 5 performed the song at the Bud Light Super Bowl Music Fest, a pre-show for Super Bowl LIV in Miami and made a tribute to Kobe Bryant, with his daughter Gianna and seven other victims of the Calabasas helicopter crash. During the COVID-19 pandemic, the band performed in isolation with a remote version of the song for the at home edition of The Tonight Show Starring Jimmy Fallon on May 12, 2020, with Levine dedicated to Bryant.

In June 2021, Maroon 5 played the song on Today, to promote the album Jordi. In September 2021, the band performed "Memories" at BB&T Pavilion in Camden, New Jersey for the CNN television special Shine a Light: A Tribute to the Families of 9/11, to commemorate with the 20th anniversary of the September 11, 2001 attacks in New York City. On January 26, 2024, Maroon 5 performed the song with French cellist Gautier Capuçon at the Le Gala des Pièces Jaunes charity event organized by the First Lady of France, Brigitte Macron, in Paris. In July 2026, Maroon 5 played the song and serving as headliner for the 2026 BST Hyde Park concert at Hyde Park, London, with the performance also served as a tribute to Jordan Feldstein.

The band also performed "Memories" for their residency titled Maroon 5: The Las Vegas Residency, and the Love Is Like Tour, with the latter where the band offers fans to share photos of themselves putting in front of a big screen while performing the song on tour.

== Usage in media ==
The song plays at the beginning of the trailer for Disney's The One and Only Ivan (2020) and during the final scene of Sony Pictures' Venom: The Last Dance (2024). "Memories" was appeared in the 2024 short film American Cancer Story from Brazilian filmmaker José Padilha and composed by the band's guitarist James Valentine, to commemorate for the 25th anniversary of the Columbine High School massacre.

== Awards and nominations ==
Awards and nominations for "Memories"
Year	Ceremony	Category	Result	Ref.
2020	ASCAP Pop Music Awards	Award Winning Song	Won	
2020	ASCAP Pop Music Awards	Publisher of the Year (Kobalt Music Group)	Won	
2020	iHeartRadio Titanium Awards	1 Billion Total Audience Spins on iHeartRadio Stations	Won	
2020	Nickelodeon Kids' Choice Awards	Favorite Song	Nominated	
2020	RTHK International Pop Poll Awards	Top 10 International Gold Song	Won	
2021	BMI Pop Awards	Award Winning Song	Won	

== Track listing ==
Record Store Day physical single

1. "Memories" - 3:09
2. "Memories" (Dillon Francis Remix) – 2:44

Digital download

1. "Memories" – 3:09

Digital download – Dillon Francis Remix

1. "Memories" (Dillon Francis Remix) – 2:44

Digital download – Devault Remix

1. "Memories" (Devault Remix) – 3:13

Digital download – Cut Copy Remix

1. "Memories" (Cut Copy Remix) – 6:57

== Personnel ==
Credits adapted from the "Memories" single and the liner notes for Jordi.

=== Maroon 5 ===
- Adam Levine - lead vocals, production
- Jesse Carmichael - additional guitar, additional keyboards
- James Valentine - guitar
- Mickey Madden - bass
- Matt Flynn - drums and percussion
- PJ Morton - keyboards
- Sam Farrar - additional keyboards

=== Additional musicians ===
- The Monsters & Strangerz – production, vocal production, programming
- Michael Pollack – additional backing vocals

=== Production ===
- Noah "Mailbox" Passovoy – engineering, vocal production
- Randy Merrill – mastering
- Serban Ghenea – mixing
- John Hanes – mix engineering
- Bo Bodnar – engineering assistance
- Sam Schamberg – engineering assistance
- Gian Stone - vocal production

== Charts ==
=== Weekly charts ===
Weekly chart performance for "Memories"
Chart (2019–2020)	Peak position
Argentina Hot 100 (Billboard)	60
Australia (ARIA)	2
Austria (Ö3 Austria Top 40)	10
Belgium (Ultratop 50 Flanders)	3
Belgium (Ultratop 50 Wallonia)	4
Bolivia (Monitor Latino)	16
Brazil (Top 100 Brasil)	77
Canada Hot 100 (Billboard)	2
Canada AC (Billboard)	1
Canada CHR/Top 40 (Billboard)	2
Canada Hot AC (Billboard)	1
Colombia Airplay (National-Report)	52
Croatia International Airplay (Top lista)	2
Czech Republic Airplay (ČNS IFPI)	13
Czech Republic Singles Digital (ČNS IFPI)	7
Denmark (Tracklisten)	17
Estonia (Eesti Tipp-40)	5
Euro Digital Song Sales (Billboard)	3
Finland (Suomen virallinen lista)	19
France (SNEP)	13
Germany (GfK)	20
Global 200 (Billboard)	71
Greece International Streaming (IFPI)	11
Hong Kong (HKRIA)	6
Hungary (Rádiós Top 40)	4
Hungary (Single Top 40)	3
Hungary (Stream Top 40)	6
Iceland (Tónlistinn)	5
Ireland (IRMA)	5
Israel International Airplay (Media Forest)	3
Italy (FIMI)	10
Italian Airplay (EarOne)	4
Japan Hot 100 (Billboard)	34
Japan Hot Overseas (Billboard Japan)	1
Latvia Streaming (LaIPA)	8
Lebanon Airplay (Lebanese Top 20)	2
Lithuania (AGATA)	8
Malaysia (RIM)	1
Mexico Airplay (Billboard)	3
Netherlands (Dutch Top 40)	2
Netherlands (Single Top 100)	2
New Zealand (Recorded Music NZ)	3
Norway (VG-lista)	2
Poland Airplay (ZPAV)	1
Portugal (AFP)	10
Romania (Airplay 100)	3
San Marino Airplay (SMRTV Top 50)	9
Scottish Singles Sales (Official Charts)	3
Singapore (RIAS)	1
Slovakia Airplay (ČNS IFPI)	1
Slovakia Singles Digital (ČNS IFPI)	3
Slovenia (SloTop50)	1
South Korea (Gaon)	11
Spain (PROMUSICAE)	22
Sweden (Sverigetopplistan)	7
Switzerland (Schweizer Hitparade)	3
UK Singles (Official Charts)	5
US Billboard Hot 100	2
US Adult Contemporary (Billboard)	1
US Adult Pop Airplay (Billboard)	1
US Dance Airplay (Billboard)	4
US Pop Airplay (Billboard)	1
US Rolling Stone Top 100	7
Venezuela (Monitor Latino)	19

2024 weekly chart performance for "Memories"
Chart (2024–2025)	Peak position
Moldova Airplay (TopHit)	73

2024–2025 weekly chart performance for "Memories"
Chart (2025)	Peak position
Moldova (Airplay TopHit)	73
Romania Airplay (TopHit)	100
South Korea BGM (Circle)	192

2026 weekly chart performance for "Memories"
Chart (2026)	Peak position
Romania Airplay (TopHit)	97

=== Year-end charts ===
2019 year-end chart performance for "Memories"
Chart (2019)	Position
Australia (ARIA)	51
Belgium (Ultratop Flanders)	77
France (SNEP)	196
Hungary (Single Top 40)	36
Latvia Streaming (LAIPA)	74
Netherlands (Dutch Top 40)	31
Netherlands (Single Top 100)	37
Portugal (AFP)	176
Sweden (Sverigetopplistan)	89
Switzerland (Schweizer Hitparade)	59
Tokyo (Tokio Hot 100)	23
US Adult Top 40 (Billboard)	46

2020 year-end chart performance for "Memories"
Chart (2020)	Position
Australia (ARIA)	21
Austria (Ö3 Austria Top 40)	59
Belgium (Ultratop Flanders)	14
Belgium (Ultratop Wallonia)	21
Bolivia (Monitor Latino)	49
Canada (Canadian Hot 100)	7
Denmark (Tracklisten)	46
France (SNEP)	62
Germany (Official German Charts)	69
Hungary (Rádiós Top 40)	37
Hungary (Single Top 40)	18
Hungary (Stream Top 40)	34
Iceland (Tónlistinn)	25
Ireland (IRMA)	42
Italy (FIMI)	87
Netherlands (Dutch Top 40)	40
Netherlands (Single Top 100)	36
New Zealand (Recorded Music NZ)	22
Poland (Polish Airplay Top 100)	45
Romania (Airplay 100)	21
Slovenia (SloTop50)	3
South Korea (Gaon)	23
Spain (PROMUSICAE)	93
Sweden (Sverigetopplistan)	63
Switzerland (Schweizer Hitparade)	21
UK Singles (OCC)	28
US Billboard Hot 100	8
US Radio Songs (Billboard)	5
US Adult Contemporary (Billboard)	1
US Adult Top 40 (Billboard)	4
US Mainstream Top 40 (Billboard)	10
US Rolling Stone Top 100	53

2021 year-end chart performance for "Memories"
Chart (2021)	Position
Australia (ARIA)	98
Global 200 (Billboard)	79
Portugal (AFP)	119
South Korea (Gaon)	61
US Adult Contemporary (Billboard)	23

2022 year-end chart performance for "Memories"
Chart (2022)	Position
South Korea (Circle)	182

== Certifications ==
Certifications and sales for "Memories"
Region	Certification	Certified units/sales
Australia (ARIA)	11× Platinum	770,000^{‡}
Austria (IFPI Austria)	Gold	15,000^{‡}
Belgium (BRMA)	2× Platinum	80,000^{‡}
Brazil (Pro-Música Brasil)	4× Diamond	640,000^{‡}
Canada (Music Canada)	4× Platinum	320,000^{‡}
Denmark (IFPI Danmark)	2× Platinum	180,000^{‡}
France (SNEP)	Diamond	333,333^{‡}
Germany (BVMI)	Platinum	400,000^{‡}
Italy (FIMI)	3× Platinum	300,000^{‡}
New Zealand (RMNZ)	7× Platinum	210,000^{‡}
Poland (ZPAV)	3× Platinum	150,000^{‡}
Portugal (AFP)	3× Platinum	30,000^{‡}
Spain (Promusicae)	3× Platinum	180,000^{‡}
United Kingdom (BPI)	3× Platinum	1,800,000^{‡}
United States (RIAA)	4× Platinum	4,000,000^{‡}
Streaming
Japan (RIAJ)	Platinum	100,000,000^{†}
South Korea (KMCA)	Platinum	100,000,000^{†}
^{‡} Sales+streaming figures based on certification alone.^{†} Streaming-only figures based on certification alone.

== Release history ==
Release dates and formats for "Memories"
Region	Date	Format	Version(s)	Label	Ref.
Various	September 20, 2019	Digital download; streaming	Original	222; Interscope	
United States	September 23, 2019	Hot adult contemporary radio	Original	222; Interscope	
United States	September 24, 2019	Contemporary hit radio	Original	222; Interscope	
Russia	September 24, 2019	Contemporary hit radio	Original	Universal	
Italy	September 27, 2019	Contemporary hit radio	Original	Universal	
Various	December 13, 2019	Digital download; streaming	Dillon Francis Remix	222; Interscope	
Various	December 16, 2019	Digital download; streaming	Devault Remix	222; Interscope	
Various	December 18, 2019	Digital download; streaming	Cut Copy Remix	222; Interscope	
United States	October 24, 2020	7" vinyl	Original; Dillon Francis Remix	IGA	

== See also ==
- List of number-one songs of 2019 (Malaysia)
- List of number-one singles of 2020 (Poland)
- List of number-one songs of 2019 (Singapore)
- List of Billboard Adult Contemporary number ones of 2020
- List of highest-certified singles in Australia
