= 12th Annual Honda Civic Tour =

2013 concert tour

- Tour by Honda Civic
- Promotional poster for tour
- Associated album: Overexposed; Greatest Hits: Chapter One
- Start date: August 1, 2013
- End date: October 6, 2013
- Legs: 1
- No. of shows: 33 in North America
- Website: civictour.honda.com

Honda Civic concert chronology
- 11th Annual Honda Civic Tour (2012); 12th Annual Honda Civic Tour (2013); 13th Annual Honda Civic Tours (2014)
Maroon 5 tour chronology
Overexposed Tour (2012–2014)	12th Annual Honda Civic Tour (2013)	Overexposed Tour (2012–2014)
Kelly Clarkson tour chronology
Stronger Tour (2012)	12th Annual Honda Civic Tour (2013)	Piece by Piece Tour (2015)

The 12th Annual Honda Civic Tour was a concert tour headlined by American pop rock band Maroon 5, alongside special guest, American pop rock singer Kelly Clarkson. Sponsored by Honda Motor Company, the tour also featured Rozzi Crane and The Voice second season contestant Tony Lucca, as well as American R&B singer PJ Morton as its supporting acts. With 33 dates, the 12th installment of the tour was the longest, which began on August 1, 2013, in Maryland Heights, Missouri at the Verizon Wireless Amphitheater and ended on October 6, 2013, at the Hollywood Bowl in Los Angeles.

== Opening acts ==
- Rozzi Crane
- Tony Lucca
- PJ Morton

== Setlists ==
Maroon 5
1. "One More Night"
2. "This Love"
3. "Lucky Strike"
4. "Tangled"
5. "Harder to Breathe" (contains elements of "Scary Monsters and Nice Sprites")
6. "Sunday Morning"
7. "I Wanna Be Your Lover" (Prince cover)
8. "Makes Me Wonder"
9. "Shiver"
10. "Wake Up Call"
11. "Won't Go Home Without You"
12. "Love Somebody"
13. "Misery"
14. "Get Lucky" (Daft Punk cover)
15. "Stereo Hearts"
16. "Moves Like Jagger"

Encore

17. "Payphone"
18. "She Will Be Loved"
19. "Daylight"
Kelly Clarkson
1. "Stronger (What Doesn't Kill You)"
2. "Behind These Hazel Eyes"
3. "Catch My Breath"
4. "My Life Would Suck Without You"
5. "Breakaway"
6. "Because of You"
7. "Don't You Wanna Stay"
8. "Tie It Up"
9. "I Never Loved a Man (The Way I Love You)" (Aretha Franklin cover)
10. "Walk Away"
11. "Mr. Know It All / Miss Independent"

Encore

1. "People Like Us"
2. "Since U Been Gone"

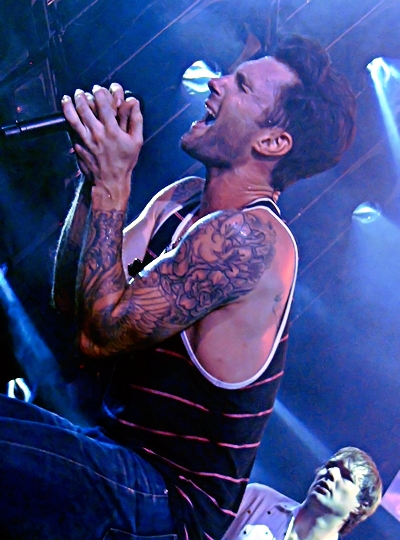
Adam Levine and Mickey Madden of Maroon 5 performing in Maryland Heights, Missouri, on the opening night of the 2013 Honda Civic Tour

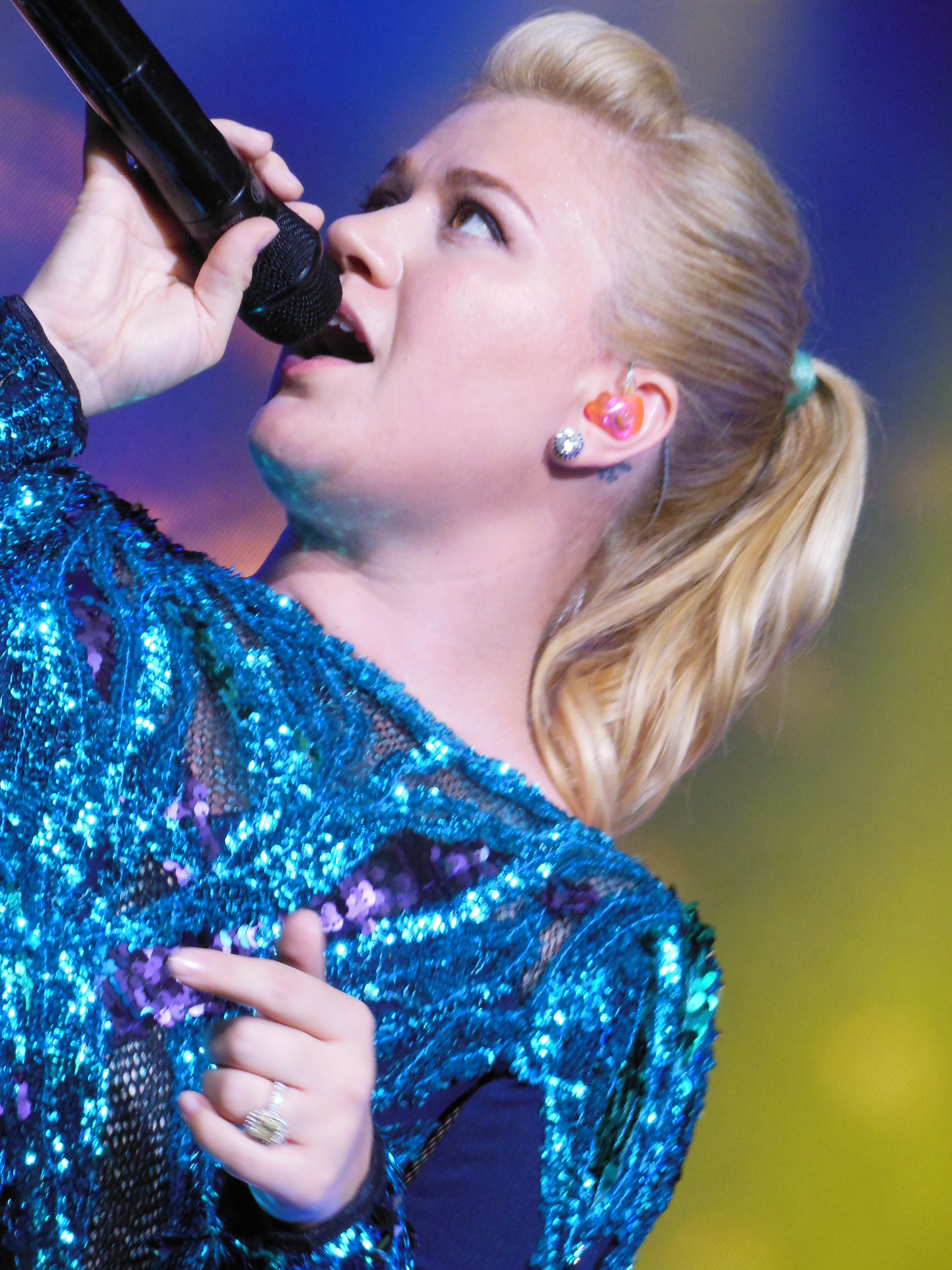
Kelly Clarkson performing during the 12th Annual Honda Civic Tour.

== Tour dates ==
Date	City	Country	Venue	Opening acts
North America
August 1, 2013	Maryland Heights	United States	Verizon Wireless Amphitheater	Rozzi Crane
August 3, 2013	Noblesville	United States	Klipsch Music Center	Rozzi Crane
August 4, 2013	Cincinnati	United States	Riverbend Music Center	Rozzi Crane
August 6, 2013	Burgettstown	United States	First Niagara Pavilion	Rozzi Crane
August 7, 2013	Camden	United States	Susquehanna Bank Center	Rozzi Crane
August 9, 2013	Mansfield	United States	Comcast Center	Rozzi Crane
August 10, 2013	Holmdel	United States	PNC Bank Arts Center	Rozzi Crane
August 11, 2013	Wantagh	United States	Nikon at Jones Beach Theater	Rozzi Crane
August 25, 2013	Tinley Park	United States	First Midwest Bank Amphitheatre	Rozzi Crane
August 26, 2013	Cuyahoga Falls	United States	Blossom Music Center	Rozzi Crane
August 28, 2013	Clarkston	United States	DTE Energy Music Theatre	Rozzi Crane
August 29, 2013	Toronto	Canada	Molson Canadian Amphitheatre	Rozzi Crane
August 31, 2013	Hartford	United States	Comcast Theatre	Rozzi Crane
September 1, 2013	Scranton	United States	Toyota Pavilion	Rozzi Crane
September 4, 2013	Darien	United States	Darien Lake Performing Arts Center	Tony Lucca
September 5, 2013	Saratoga Springs	United States	Saratoga Performing Arts Center	Tony Lucca
September 6, 2013 (Note: The concert on September 6, 2013 in Bristow was originally scheduled on August 13, 2013, due to a scheduling conflict.)	Bristow	United States	Jiffy Lube Live	Tony Lucca
September 8, 2013	Virginia Beach	United States	Farm Bureau Live	Tony Lucca
September 10, 2013	Raleigh	United States	Walnut Creek Amphitheatre	Tony Lucca
September 11, 2013	Charlotte	United States	Verizon Wireless Amphitheatre	Tony Lucca
September 13, 2013	Tampa	United States	MidFlorida Credit Union Amphitheatre	PJ Morton
September 14, 2013	West Palm Beach	United States	Cruzan Amphitheatre	PJ Morton
September 16, 2013	Atlanta	United States	Aaron's Amphitheatre	PJ Morton
September 18, 2013	Austin	United States	Austin360 Amphitheater	PJ Morton
September 19, 2013	The Woodlands	United States	Cynthia Woods Mitchell Pavilion	PJ Morton
September 22, 2013	Dallas	United States	Gexa Energy Pavilion	PJ Morton
September 24, 2013	Greenwood Village	United States	Fiddler's Green Amphitheatre	Rozzi Crane
September 27, 2013	Ridgefield	United States	Sleep Country Amphitheater	Rozzi Crane
October 1, 2013	Wheatland	United States	Sleep Train Amphitheatre	Rozzi Crane
October 2, 2013	Mountain View	United States	Shoreline Amphitheatre	Rozzi Crane
October 4, 2013	Irvine	United States	Verizon Wireless Amphitheatre	Rozzi Crane
October 5, 2013	Chula Vista	United States	Sleep Train Amphitheatre	Rozzi Crane
October 6, 2013	Los Angeles	United States	Hollywood Bowl	Rozzi Crane

=== Box office ===
On June 4, 2013, it was announced that the Maryland Heights, Burgettstown, Mansfield, Holmdel, Wantagh, Clarkston, Austin, The Woodlands, Denver, Irvine and Los Angeles show were sold out.

== Cancelled dates ==
List of cancelled concerts, showing date, city, country, venue and reason for cancellation
Date	City	Country	Venue	Reason	Ref.
September 28, 2013	George	United States	Gorge Amphitheatre	Inclement weather	
