= Lucky Strike (song) =

Promotional single by Maroon 5

from the album Overexposed
- Released: January 20, 2014
- Recorded: Mid 2011–Early 2012
- Studio: Conway Recording Studios (Los Angeles, California)
- Genre: Dance-rock; funk
- Length: 3:05
- Label: A&M Octone
- Songwriters: Adam Levine; Ryan Tedder; Noel Zancanella
- Producers: Ryan Tedder; Noel Zancanella

Maroon 5 promotional singles chronology
| "Is Anybody Out There" (2011) | "Lucky Strike" (2014) | "It Was Always You" (2014) |

"Lucky Strike" is a song by American pop rock band Maroon 5, and is the fourth track on their fourth studio album Overexposed (2012). The song was released on January 20, 2014, in Belgium, as the album's first and only promotional single. It was written by band frontman Adam Levine with producers Ryan Tedder and Noel Zancanella.

The song received generally positive reviews from critics, and is generally regarded as one of the best tracks on Overexposed. Following the release of the album, the song peaked on many different charts, including number three on the singles chart in South Korea and number nine on the US Bubbling Under Hot 100 Singles.

== Background ==
=== Composition ===
"Lucky Strike"
A sample of "Lucky Strike", a funk song that contains instrumentation consisted of piano, "driven guitar" accompanied with Levine's vocals.

"Lucky Strike" is a funk song that features dubstep and soul influences. The song's instrumentation consists of piano and guitar accompanied with Levine's vocals. "Lucky Strike" is written in the key of B minor, in common time (4/4), with a tempo of 144 beats per minute. Levine's vocal range spans from the low note of A_{4} to the high note of B_{5}. According to Robert Copsey of Digital Spy, the song contains the same "bells-and-whistles template" that is present in the band's previous single "Moves Like Jagger". Chuck Arnold of People shared the same opinion as Copsey and described the song as "lightning-paced". Lyrically, the song discovers the theme of sexual intercourse that can be seen through the lines, "Your body rockin', keep me up all night/One in a million, my lucky strike".

=== Live performances ===
"Lucky Strike" is the fifteenth most performed song live by Maroon 5, being played 252 times by the band. The song was debuted live on the Overexposed Tour, and was played at many shows on the tour.

The song was played during most (if not all) shows on the band's Maroon V Tour.

It was played very few times on the Red Pill Blues Tour, and has been played only semi-often since then.

== Critical reception ==
Adam Markovitz of Entertainment Weekly labeled "Lucky Strike" and "Payphone" as the best tracks on Overexposed and described the former as "a funk-spiked strut". Suzanne Byrne of RTÉ.ie wrote that "Lucky Strike" alongside "Daylight", "The Man Who Never Lied" and "Love Somebody" are all worthy of a single releases (Daylight and Love Somebody were later released as singles). Digital Spy's Robert Copsey named the track together with "One More Night" and "Ladykiller" as the most worthy for download. Chris Payne of Billboard wrote that on the song "Maroon 5's guitars finally come out to play in the opening bars here. Though not a rock song per se, it still packs the energy of the band's earlier, more band-based material." Cameron Adams of Herald Sun described "Lucky Strike" as "uncharacteristically clubby".

Contact Music's Alex Lai wrote that Levine has exchanged his "angelic vocals for singing in favor of more universal hooks" on the album, pointing out Lucky Strike specifically. Evan Sawdey of PopMatters called the song a "danceable carbon copy" of "Second Chance" (Gimme Some, 2011) by Peter Bjorn and John. According to him, "Lucky Strike" imitates the latter "down to the guitar tone" and replaces the original by also adding additional dance beats. The song was compared to the electronic duo 3OH!3 by a writer from The Triangle.

== Commercial performance ==
Upon the release of Overexposed, due to strong digital downloads "Lucky Strike" debuted on the South Korea Gaon International Chart at number two on June 24, 2012, with sales of 53,090 copies. The next week it fell to number four and sold an additional 39,392 copies. Following the release of the album, the song peaked at number nine on the Billboard Bubbling Under Hot 100 singles chart.

The song has received over 100 million streams on Spotify. As of November 2022, the song has 110.5 million streams.

== Personnel ==
Based on the liner notes of Overexposed, A&M Octone Records.

Maroon 5

- Adam Levine – lead and backing vocals, rhythm guitar, songwriting, production
- Mickey Madden – bass guitar, songwriting
- James Valentine – lead and rhythm guitar, backing vocals, sitar, keyboards, songwriting, production
- Matt Flynn – drums, percussion
- PJ Morton – keyboards, synthesizers, backing vocals

Production

- Ryan Tedder – production, songwriting
- Noel Zancanella – production, keyboards, songwriting
- Smith Carlson - engineering
- Noah "Mailbox" Passovoy - engineering
- Eric Eylands - assistant engineering
- Serban Ghenea - mixing
- John Hanes - mixing engineer
- Phil Seaford - mixing assistant
- Engineered at Patriot Studios, Denver, Colorado; Conway Studios, Los Angeles, California
- Mixed at Mixstar Studios, Virginia Beach.

== Charts and certifications ==
=== Weekly charts ===
| Chart (2012–14) | Peak position |
|---|---|
| Belgium (Ultratip Bubbling Under Flanders) | 3 |
| Canada AC (Billboard) | 37 |
| Canada Hot AC (Billboard) | 39 |
| Canada (Canadian Digital Song Sales) | 68 |
| South Korea (Gaon Digital Chart) | 3 |
| US Bubbling Under Hot 100 Singles (Billboard) | 9 |
| US Adult Top 40 (Billboard) | 33 |

=== Certifications ===
| Region | Certification | Certified units/sales |
|---|---|---|
| South Korea (Gaon Chart) | — | 424,152 |
| United States (RIAA) | Gold | 500,000^{‡} |
^{‡} Sales+streaming figures based on certification alone.
