= Prerelease cover version =

In the music industry, a prerelease cover version is a type of cover version that arose during the "iTunes era" of the early 2010s when a cover artist released a version of a song before the original artist does. This practise took advantage of a 'release window'; it occurred when an upcoming song receives much airplay despite not yet having been released. Prerelease cover versions were common in the UK for a period because of the unique situation there in that songs by big acts got weeks of airplay before being released, giving cover artists enough time for session musicians and computer experts to record a near-exact cover version of the song. For example, UK number one "Talk Dirty" by Jason Derulo featuring 2 Chainz, made No. 71 the week before it made No. 1 in the form of a prerelease cover version by Select Hits. Usually the original artist's record label would notice the cover version and release the original early; one example is when Can You Blow My covered Flo Rida's "Whistle" and making the top 40 at No. 38, causing Rida's record label to rush-release the song mid-week. Avicii's "Wake Me Up!" was intended to be released on 8 September 2013 however on 15 July 2013 the Official Charts Company announced that it would be released that week after a group called Spark Productions recorded a prerelease cover version and made No. 26 on the UK Singles Chart with it.

A successful prerelease cover version is Precision Tunes' version of Maroon 5's "Payphone", which sold 34,492 copies and charted in the top ten on three charts. After The Sunday Telegraph tracked him down, he said that "We have currently restructured [PT Records] and its employees, [and] are in the process of issuing takedowns [of our previously released covers] and researching accounting for those releases and plan to relinquish any monies made on the nine releases".

== Legal status ==
While the practice is legal, the area of licensing they operated in has been described by PRS for Music as "tricky". Barney Hooper from PRS for Music said that along with record labels and publishers the trend was something they were "investigating" and "thinking about a bit more".

Let's say if they chart very highly - that could be quite a bit of money that the performer who was meant to perform it would be losing out on. We want consumers to know that they are buying a track or a song that's by the people they think should be performing it.

— Barney Hooper

In the United States, a songwriter has the preemptive right to determine who will record the first version of a song, making prerelease covers less common there.
