= Overexposed Tour =

2012–2014 concert tour by Maroon 5

- Tour by Maroon 5
- Promotional poster for the tour
- Associated album: Overexposed
- Start date: August 14, 2012
- End date: January 20, 2014
- Legs: 5
- No. of shows: 70

Maroon 5 concert chronology
- Hands All Over Tour (2011–2012); Overexposed Tour (2012–2014); 2013 Honda Civic Tour (2013)
2013 Honda Civic Tour (2013)	Overexposed Tour (2012–2014)	Maroon V Tour (2015–2018)

The Overexposed Tour was the eighth concert tour by the American pop rock band Maroon 5, in support of their fourth studio album, Overexposed (2012). The tour consisted of shows in the Americas, Asia, Europe, Oceania, and included the band's first concerts in several countries.

== Setlist ==
1. "Payphone"
2. "Never Gonna Leave This Bed"
3. "Makes Me Wonder"
4. "Lucky Strike"
5. "Sunday Morning"
6. "If I Never See Your Face Again"
7. "Wipe Your Eyes"
8. "Won't Go Home Without You"
9. "Love Somebody"
10. "Harder to Breathe" (contains elements of "Scary Monsters and Nice Sprites")
11. "Wake Up Call"
12. "The Bed's Too Big Without You" (The Police cover)
13. "One More Night"
14. "Hands All Over"
15. "Misery"
16. "This Love" / "Don't Forget Me" (Red Hot Chili Peppers cover)

Encore

16. "Seven Nation Army" (The White Stripes cover)
17. "She Will Be Loved"
18. "Stereo Hearts" (Gym Class Heroes cover)
19. "Daylight"
20. Medley: "Don't You Want Me" / "SexyBack"
21. "Moves Like Jagger"
Notes
- During the show in Auburn Hills, Michigan, on February 14, 2013, Maroon 5 performing a special night event to commemorate Valentine's Day.
- During the show in Montreal, Canada, on February 20, 2013, Canadian artist Dana Ben David came on stage joining with the band's singer Adam Levine, where Maroon 5 playing "Daylight", for a special performance in front of the audience.

== Opening acts ==
- Keane (Brazil)
- Javier Colon (Argentina, Peru, Paraguay)
- The Cab (Asia, Australia)
- Rozzi Crane (North America)
- Neon Trees (North America)
- A Great Big World (North America)
- Owl City (North America)
- The Black Keys (North America)
- Evermore (Australia)
- PJ Morton (Europe)
- Robin Thicke (Europe)

== Shows ==
Date	City	Country	Venue
2012
Latin America
August 14	Monterrey	Mexico	Arena Monterrey
August 16	Mexico City	Mexico	Mexico City Arena
August 17	Zapopan	Mexico	Auditorio Telmex
August 21	Mexico City	Mexico	Mexico City Arena
August 24	Curitiba	Brazil	Expotrade Arena
August 25	Rio de Janeiro	Brazil	HSBC Arena
August 26 (Note: The concert on August 26, 2012 in Sao Paulo, was part of Live Music Rocks show.)	São Paulo	Brazil	Arena Anhembi
August 28	Lima	Peru	Estadio Monumental "U"
August 29	Santiago	Chile	Movistar Arena
August 31	Buenos Aires	Argentina	Ricardo Etcheverri Stadium
September 1	Asunción	Paraguay	Jockey Club del Paraguay
Asia
September 14	Busan	South Korea	Sajik Arena
September 15	Seoul	South Korea	Jamsil Arena
September 18	Quezon City	Philippines	Smart Araneta Coliseum
September 20	Shah Alam	Malaysia	Shah Alam Stadium
September 22 (Note: The September 22, 2012 concert in Singapore is part of the 2012 Formula One Singapore Grand Prix concert series.)	Singapore		Marina Bay Street Circuit
September 25	Shanghai	China	Mercedes-Benz Arena
September 27	Hong Kong		AsiaWorld–Arena
September 29	Taipei	Taiwan	TWTC Nangang Exhibition Hall
October 2	Tokyo	Japan	Nippon Budokan
October 4	Jakarta	Indonesia	Istora Senayan
October 5	Jakarta	Indonesia	Istora Senayan
October 8	Bangkok	Thailand	Impact Arena
Oceania
October 12	Melbourne	Australia	Rod Laver Arena
October 13	Sydney	Australia	Sydney Entertainment Centre
2013
North America
February 13	Columbus	United States	Schottenstein Center
February 14	Auburn Hills	United States	The Palace of Auburn Hills
February 16 (Note: With Neon Trees alone, Owl City unable to perform due to singer Adam Young being illness.)	New York City	United States	Madison Square Garden
February 17	Manchester	United States	Verizon Wireless Arena
February 19	Toronto	Canada	Air Canada Centre
February 20	Montreal	Canada	Bell Centre
February 22	Uncasville	United States	Mohegan Sun Arena
February 23	East Rutherford	United States	Izod Center
February 25	Grand Rapids	United States	Van Andel Arena
February 27	Kansas City	United States	Sprint Center
March 1	Moline	United States	iWireless Center
March 3	Omaha	United States	CenturyLink Center
March 4	Saint Paul	United States	Xcel Energy Center
March 7	Calgary	Canada	Scotiabank Saddledome
March 9	Vancouver	Canada	Rogers Arena
March 11	Seattle	United States	KeyArena
March 13	San Jose	United States	HP Pavilion at San Jose
March 15	Los Angeles	United States	Staples Center
March 16	Las Vegas	United States	Mandalay Bay Events Center
March 19	Houston	United States	Toyota Center
March 21	Dallas	United States	American Airlines Center
March 22	Tulsa	United States	BOK Center
March 24	Nashville	United States	Bridgestone Arena
March 26	Birmingham	United States	BJCC Arena
March 27	Atlanta	United States	Philips Arena
March 29	Sunrise	United States	BankAtlantic Center
March 30	Orlando	United States	Amway Center
April 1	Jacksonville	United States	Jacksonville Veterans Memorial Arena
April 3	Washington, D.C.	United States	Verizon Center
April 4	Philadelphia	United States	Wells Fargo Center
April 6	Rosemont	United States	Allstate Arena
May 3 (Note: The May 3, 2013 concert at Fair Grounds Race Course in New Orleans is part of the New Orleans Jazz & Heritage Festival.)	New Orleans	United States	Fair Grounds Race Course
May 11 (Note: The May 11, 2013 concert at the Home Depot Center is part of the 2013 Wango Tango.)	Carson	United States	Home Depot Center
September 21 (Note: The September 21, 2013 concert at the MGM Grand Garden Arena in Las Vegas was part of the 2013 iHeartRadio Music Festival.)	Las Vegas	United States	MGM Grand Garden Arena
September 25 (Note: The concert on September 25, 2013 in San Francisco was part of the Oracle OpenWorld 2013.)	San Francisco	United States	Treasure Island
December 30 (Note: The concerts on December 30 and 31, 2013, in Las Vegas is part of the New Year's Eve 2014 Festival.)	Las Vegas	United States	Mandalay Bay Events Center
December 31	Las Vegas	United States	Mandalay Bay Events Center
2014
Europe
January 8 (Note: The January 8, 2014 concert at the LG Arena in Birmingham was originally scheduled to take place on June 22, 2013, but was postponed due to unforeseen scheduling conflicts.)	Birmingham	England	LG Arena
January 10 (Note: The January 10, 2014 concert at the O_{2} Arena in London was originally scheduled to take place on June 23, 2013, but was postponed due to unforeseen scheduling conflicts.)	London	England	The O_{2} Arena
January 11 (Note: The January 11, 2014 concert at the O_{2} Arena in London was originally scheduled to take place on June 24, 2013, but was postponed due to unforeseen scheduling conflicts.)	London	England	The O_{2} Arena
January 13 (Note: The January 13, 2014 concert at the Manchester Arena was originally scheduled to take place on June 26, 2013, but was postponed due to unforeseen scheduling conflicts.)	Manchester	England	Phones 4u Arena
January 14 (Note: The January 14, 2014 concert at the Hydro Arena in Glasgow was originally scheduled to take place on June 27, 2013 at the Braehead Arena, but was postponed due to unforeseen scheduling conflicts.)	Glasgow	Scotland	SSE Hydro
January 16 (Note: The January 16, 2014 concert at The O_{2} in Dublin was originally scheduled to take place on June 29, 2013, but was postponed due to unforeseen scheduling conflicts.)	Dublin	Ireland	The O_{2}
January 19 (Note: The January 19, 2014 concert at the Bercy Arena in Paris was originally scheduled to take place on July 2, 2013, but was postponed due to unforeseen scheduling conflicts.)	Paris	France	Palais Omnisports de Paris-Bercy
January 20 (Note: The January 20, 2014 concert at the Ziggo Dome in Amsterdam was originally scheduled to take place on July 3, 2013, but was postponed due to unforeseen scheduling conflicts.)	Amsterdam	Netherlands	Ziggo Dome

=== Box office score data ===
Venue	City	Tickets sold / available	Gross revenue
Expotrade Arena	Pinhais	9,673 / 9,673 (100%)	$792,981
HSBC Arena	Rio de Janeiro	15,000 / 15,000 (100%)	$1,218,066
Arena Anhembi	São Paulo	35,000 / 35,000 (100%)	$2,799,348
Jockey Club	Asunción	14,000 / 14,000 (100%)	$720,518
Jamsil Sports Complex	Seoul	23,500 / 23,500 (100%)	$3,952,137
Mercedes-Benz Arena	Shanghai	10,229 / 10,229 (100%)	$1,059,014
Sydney Entertainment Centre	Sydney	10,401 / 10,401 (100%)	$941,922
Bell Centre	Montreal	15,980 / 15,980 (100%)	$1,137,770
Mohegan Sun Arena	Uncasville	5,556 / 5,556 (100%)	$452,120
Van Andel Arena	Grand Rapids	11,578 / 11,578 (100%)	$725,692
Staples Center	Los Angeles	15,192 / 15,192 (100%)	$1,071,816
BOK Center	Tulsa	13,973 / 13,973 (100%)	$803,004
Total		180,082 / 180,082 (100%)	$15,674,388
