= Precision Tunes =

- Also known as: Precision Tunes
- Born: Joshua Weinstein
- Label: PT Records

Joshua Weinstein (also known as Precision Tunes) is a New York-based music producer. His pre-release cover version of Maroon 5's "Payphone" made #9 on the UK Singles Chart, selling 34,492 copies. The song also charted at #4 on the Scottish Singles Chart and the UK Indie Chart.

After The Sunday Telegraph tracked him down, he said that "We have currently restructured [PT Records] and its employees, [and] are in the process of issuing takedowns [of our previously released covers] and researching accounting for those releases and plan to relinquish any monies made on the nine releases".
