= Daylight (Maroon 5 song) =

2012 single by Maroon 5

Single by Maroon 5

from the album Overexposed
- Released: November 27, 2012
- Studio: Conway, (Los Angeles, California)
- Genre: Soft rock
- Length: 3:46
- Label: A&M Octone
- Songwriters: Adam Levine; Max Martin; Sam Martin; Mason Levy
- Producers: Levine; MdL; Max Martin

Maroon 5 singles chronology
"One More Night" (2012)	"Daylight" (2012)	"Love Somebody" (2013)

Audio video
- "Daylight" on YouTube

"Daylight" is a song performed by American band Maroon 5. The song was released on November 27, 2012 by A&M Octone Records, as the third single from their fourth studio album Overexposed (2012). Lead singer, Adam Levine co-wrote and co-produced it with Max Martin and Mason "MdL" Levy, with additional writing from Sam Martin. The song is a soft rock ballad about realizing that one has to move on from an old relationship, but not fully wanting to leave just yet.

The song received a mixed reception from music critics. Some criticized Levine's vocals and called it a filler among the dance-oriented tracks on the album, while others felt a Coldplay inspiration in the end of the chorus. Commercially, the song reached the top 10 in the United States, Canada, Israel, and Lebanon.

== Background and writing ==
"Daylight" was announced as the third single taken from the band's fourth studio album Overexposed (2012). It was released by A&M Octone Records on contemporary hit radio in the US on November 27, 2012. "Daylight" was written by Adam Levine, Max Martin, Sam Martin and Mason "MdL" Levy, while production was handled by Levine, Martin and MdL. Levine has stated numerous times that it is his favorite track on the entire album. It is a soft rock song.

The song features additional vocals by actress Brie Larson. During her own music career, Larson had said that Maroon 5's Adam Levine was her main inspiration.

== Critical reception ==
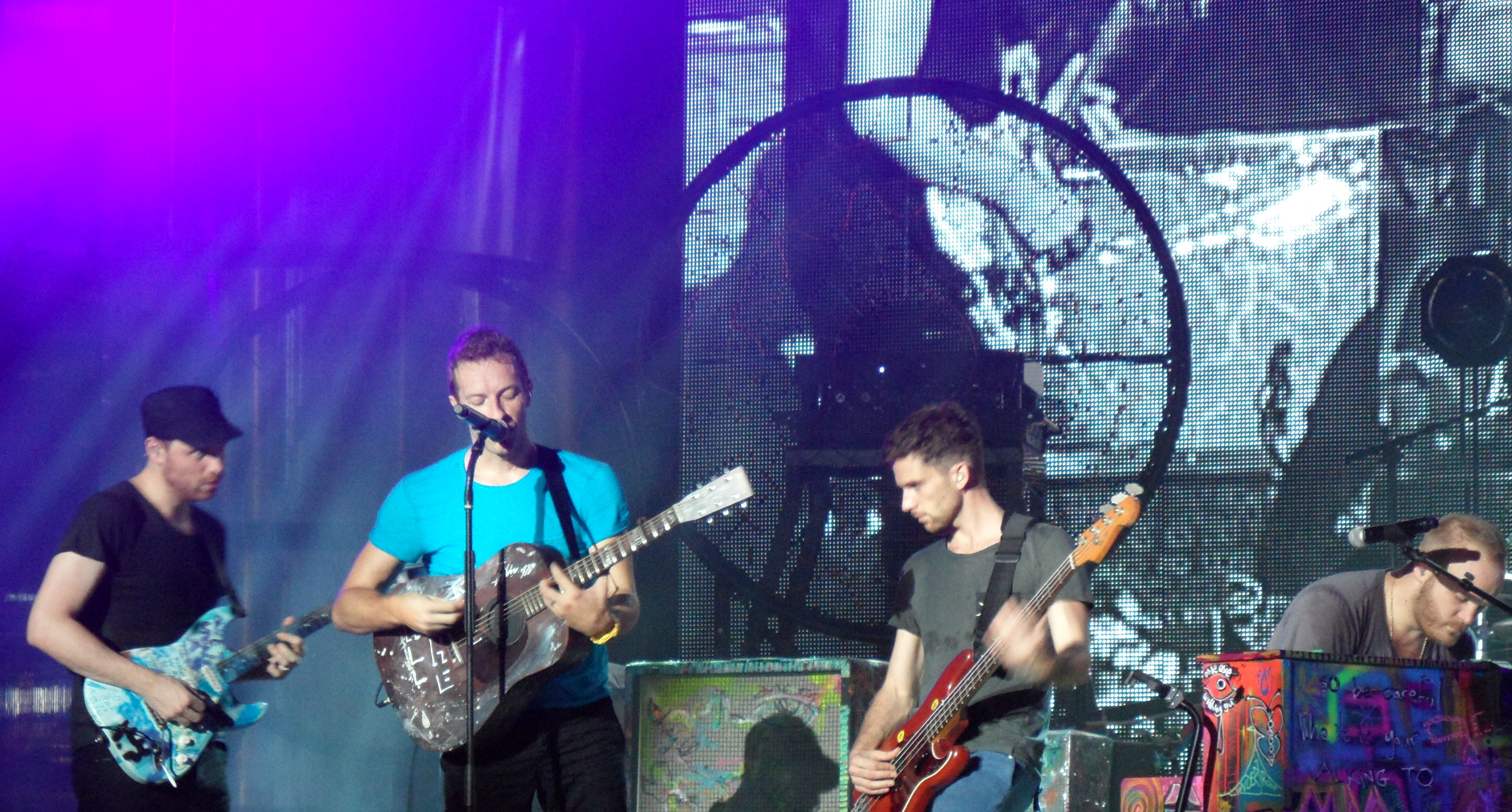
Many critics agreed that the song resembles Coldplay songs.

The song received mixed reviews from most music critics. Cameron Adams from The Herald Sun noted that the intro is the same as in the Backstreet Boys' 2005 single "Just Want You to Know". Adams also noted that "it sounds like Max Martin trying to write a Coldplay song by recycling his Backstreet Boys handiwork." Chris Payne wrote for Billboard that Daylight is "a bittersweet tale that builds momentum towards one of the album's most up-tempo songs that follows it; listen closely and you might hear a Chris Martin homage in Levine's 'whoa-oh's'." Mesfin Fekadu from The Huffington Post also saw similarities, writing that the song "looks like a bad Coldplay cover." Adam Markovitz from Entertainment Weekly agreed, calling it "a Coldplay-ish song." Markovitz also wrote that the song "has choruses so thickly produced that the only physical instrument you can reliably pick out is Levine's larynx. Not that he comes off as particularly organic either, since his voice is usually processed into a kind of high, disaffected whine — like a male Rihanna or an android castrato — that's ideal for tracing the contours of a pop hook." Helen Nowotnik of The Triangle analyzed that "If 'Never Gonna Leave This Bed' and 'Must Get Out' collided into one song, it would be 'Daylight'" and thought that the song is "the perfect fusion of Maroon 5's old and new sounds."

Evan Sawdey of PopMatters wrote the song "is your big anthem that actually could've been a lot bigger had they not relied entirely on a thin drum palette during the chorus." Martyn Young from musicOMH wrote that "By far the most irritating aspect of their magpie-like approach though is the overuse of a 'Whoah, whoah, whoah' vocal which features in almost every song, including 'Daylight'." Robert Copsey of Digital Spy wrote that the song "feels anonymous despite its stadium-sized chorus." Grace Duncan of Under the Gun called it "watery and uninteresting, a pop song walled in by clichéd optimistic meanderings."

== Chart performance ==
"Daylight" debuted at number 70 on the ARIA Charts. "Daylight" is the band's thirteenth top 100 single and follows on from their last three consecutive tracks that all peaked at number 2 – "Moves like Jagger" (in August, 2011), "Payphone" (in June, 2012) and "One More Night" (in August, 2012). It later climbed to number 37, on November 25, 2012. The song re-entered only on January 27, 2013, at number 19, becoming its peak position. In New Zealand, the song debuted at number 32 on the RIANZ chart week of December 24, 2012. The following week, it climbed to number 23, remaining the position for a further week. Later, it jumped to number 19, while in its fifth week, it peaked at number 11.

"Daylight" debuted at number 77 on the Billboard Hot 100 chart, on the week ending December 22, 2012. The same week, it also debuted on the Adult Pop Songs, at number 37. Later, the song climbed to number 58 on the Hot 100 chart, becoming the "Greatest Gainer", on the week ending December 29, 2012. In its third week, the song gave a climb to number 46. In its eighth week, the song jumped to number 17, while in its ninth week, it climbed to number 14. In its tenth week, the song jumped to number 7, after its performance at the Grammys, becoming their seventh Hot 100 top 10 single. As of June 2014, the song has sold 2,169,000 copies in the US.

In Canada, the song debuted at number 95, before climbing to number 54, becoming the "Greatest Gainer". In its sixth week, the song jumped to number 10, becoming their eighth top-ten single in Canada, while being the first time that they have three top-ten singles from the same album.

== Music videos ==
=== The Daylight Project video ===
On September 18, 2012, the band announced on their website: "We need YOUR help for our next music video. We're asking YOU to record and share 'YOUR story', and that recording may be handpicked to appear in the video for our third single, 'Daylight', directed by Jonas Åkerlund." Levine says, "As different as we all are, there are common themes that bring us together, inspire and show everyone what is important today. With this video, we'll present the world today and beyond, creating more than just a music video." They also launched a website called "The Daylight Project" for more information and the people to submit their video. The completed video is premiered through E! and Vevo on December 10, 2012. The accompanying music video sees fans express things they love and hate throughout, after the band asked them to submit entries online.

=== Playing for Change video ===
Another music video was made, titled "Daylight (Playing for Change)", directed by Mark Johnson and released on the band's YouTube channel on January 17, 2013. It includes artist Chelsea Williams and various street musicians from around the world singing along and playing instruments with scenes of Maroon 5 performing live on concert shows.

== Live performances ==
On August 14, 2012, Maroon 5 performed "Daylight" for the first time on the Overexposed Tour in Monterrey, Mexico. On November 8, 2012, the band performed "Daylight" on the third season of The Voice. Later, the band was also performed the song on The Ellen DeGeneres Show on November 12 and Saturday Night Live on November 17, along with "One More Night". On February 10, 2013, Maroon 5 performed "Daylight" at the 2013 Grammy Awards, on a mashup with "Girl on Fire", alongside Alicia Keys. The performance was introduced by LL Cool J, who claimed the performance was going to be "literally on fire." The performance was heavily criticized by critics in general. Samantha Martin of Pop Dust gave the performance 2.5 out of 5 stars, writing that she was "bored" with the performance, criticizing Alicia's onstage abilities. Martin also wrote that, "As expected, it was bland, and the interplay between 'Girl of Fire' and 'Daylight' weren't as clever or inspired as LL Cool J might have advertised." Melissa Locker of Time gave the performance a "C" rating, writing that "the problem is: both songs are repetitive and light on hooks—mashing them together did neither song any favors." Marc Hogan of Spin listed the performance as one of the "worst," writing that Keys was "unfortunately below-her-usual-standards." He criticized her for not playing her usual piano, writing that "her stint on drums still felt like an effort to signal that she, like Maroon 5, can play an Instrument. It didn't matter. It doesn't matter. It never mattered," he concluded.

== Credits and personnel ==
Credits adapted from the liner notes of Overexposed, A&M/Octone Records.

Recording locations

- Recording – Conway Studios, (Los Angeles, California)
- Mixed at – MixStar Studios, (Virginia Beach, Virginia)

Personnel

- Written by – Adam Levine, Mason Levy, Max Martin, Sam Martin
- Producer – Adam Levine, MdL, Max Martin
- Backing vocals – Brie Larson, Max Martin, Mickey Madden, Savannah Buffett
- Drums – MdL, Shellback, Matt Flynn
- Engineer (assistant for mix) – Phil Seaford
- Engineer (assistant) – Eric Eylands
- Engineer (for mix) – John Hanes
- Guitar (additional), vocals (additional), keyboards (additional) – Max Martin
- Mixed by – Serban Ghenea
- Guitar (lead) – James Valentine
- Bass – Mickey Madden
- Programmed by (additional) – Max Martin, Shellback
- Programmed by, keyboards – MdL
- Recorded by – Noah "Mailbox" Passovoy

== Charts ==
=== Weekly charts ===
Chart (2012–2013)	Peak position
Australia (ARIA)	19
Austria (Ö3 Austria Top 40)	35
Belgium (Ultratip Bubbling Under Flanders)	8
Belgium (Ultratip Bubbling Under Wallonia)	13
Canada Hot 100 (Billboard)	5
Canada AC (Billboard)	2
Canada CHR/Top 40 (Billboard)	3
Canada Hot AC (Billboard)	1
Czech Republic Airplay (ČNS IFPI)	11
Denmark Airplay (Tracklisten)	8
France (SNEP)	74
Germany (GfK)	75
Ireland (IRMA)	37
Israel International Airplay (Media Forest)	7
Italy (FIMI)	18
Italian Airplay (EarOne)	28
Lebanon (OLT20)	8
Mexico (Billboard Mexican Airplay)	15
Mexico Anglo (Monitor Latino)	6
Netherlands (Dutch Top 40)	29
Netherlands (Single Top 100)	58
New Zealand (Recorded Music NZ)	11
Slovakia Airplay (ČNS IFPI)	38
Slovenia (SloTop50)	48
South Korea (Gaon)	99
Switzerland (Schweizer Hitparade)	53
UK Singles (Official Charts)	63
US Billboard Hot 100	7
US Adult Contemporary (Billboard)	2
US Adult Pop Airplay (Billboard)	1
US Dance Airplay (Billboard)	15
US Latin Airplay (Billboard)	41
US Pop Airplay (Billboard)	1
US Rhythmic Airplay (Billboard)	33

=== Year-end charts ===
Chart (2013)	Position
Brazil (Crowley)	61
Canada (Canadian Hot 100)	22
Italy (FIMI)	83
Netherlands (Dutch Top 40)	176
US Billboard Hot 100	35
US Adult Contemporary (Billboard)	6
US Adult Top 40 (Billboard)	3
US Mainstream Top 40 (Billboard)	10

== Certifications ==
Region	Certification	Certified units/sales
Australia (ARIA)	2× Platinum	140,000^{‡}
Brazil (Pro-Música Brasil)	Platinum	60,000^{‡}
Canada (Music Canada)	2× Platinum	160,000^{*}
Italy (FIMI)	Gold	15,000^{*}
New Zealand (RMNZ)	Platinum	15,000^{*}
United States (RIAA)	2× Platinum	2,169,000
Streaming
Denmark (IFPI Danmark)	Gold	900,000^{†}
^{*} Sales figures based on certification alone.^{‡} Sales+streaming figures based on certification alone.^{†} Streaming-only figures based on certification alone.

== Release history ==
Region	Date	Format	Label	Ref.
United States	November 27, 2012	Contemporary hit radio	A&M Octone	
Italy	January 11, 2013	Contemporary hit radio	Universal	
