= Select Hits (band) =

- Genre: Pop
- Years active: 2013
- Label: Select Hits Music

Select Hits is a cover band. They hit #79 on the UK Singles Chart with a pre-release cover version of "Sonnentanz (Sun Don't Shine)" and a UK #71 hit with a pre-release cover version of "Talk Dirty".

== Discography ==
Song	Original artist	UK chart position	Reference
"Sonnentanz (Sun Don't Shine)"	Klangkarussell ft. Will Heard	79	
"Talk Dirty"	Jason Derulo ft. 2 Chainz	71	
