= One More Night (Maroon 5 song) =

2012 single by Maroon 5

Single by Maroon 5

from the album Overexposed
- Released: June 19, 2012
- Recorded: 2012
- Genre: Pop rock; reggae rock; electropop
- Length: 3:39
- Label: A&M Octone
- Songwriters: Adam Levine; Shellback; Max Martin; Savan Kotecha
- Producers: Shellback; Max Martin

Maroon 5 singles chronology
"Payphone" (2012)	"One More Night" (2012)	"Daylight" (2012)

Music video
- "One More Night" on YouTube

"One More Night" is a song performed by American pop rock band Maroon 5. The song was released on June 19, 2012, by A&M Octone Records, as the second single from their fourth studio album Overexposed (2012). It was written by Adam Levine, Shellback, Max Martin, and Savan Kotecha, while production was handled by Shellback and Martin. It is a reggae-influenced pop song. Lyrically, it talks about not getting along with someone and hoping he only stays with her just "one more night". It is built upon the idea that the heart, mind, and body usually want opposing things.

The song received mixed to positive reviews from music critics. Most of them complimented the reggae influence on the track, Levine's vocals and labeled it a "summer catchy song". However, some critics perceived a lack of identity and criticized the song's melody. "One More Night" spent nine consecutive weeks at number one on the Billboard Hot 100. The song has also been a success on the Australian Singles Chart and on the Canadian Hot 100, reaching number two and topping the New Zealand Singles Chart and the South Korean Gaon International Chart. "One More Night" has sold 6.9 million copies, becoming the eighth best-selling song worldwide in 2012.

A music video directed by Peter Berg, premiered on MTV on June 25, 2012. In the video, Levine becomes a boxer working to support his girlfriend and baby daughter. As he spends time training for a big fight, he struggles to stay close to his girlfriend while raising their child together. Though Levine appears determined, his girlfriend seems troubled by his bloody profession and lack of financial stability for their daughter and leaves him in the end. Maroon 5 performed "One More Night" live on The Today Show, Late Show with David Letterman and the Overexposed Tour.

== Composition and lyrics ==
"One More Night"
Music critics praised the reggae-inspired composition and Levine's confident vocals on the song.

"One More Night" was written by Adam Levine, Shellback, Max Martin, and Savan Kotecha, while production was handled by Martin and Shellback. It is a reggae-influenced pop song where the bass line in the refrain is taken from the song "The Bed's Too Big Without You" by The Police. According to the sheet music published at Musicnotes.com by Universal Music, the song is in the key of F minor and in 4/4 time with a tempo of 93 beats per minute. It follows a chord progression of Fm–E♭–B♭m, and Levine's vocals span from F_{3} to C_{5}.

The song's lyrics are about a man who feels guilty about staying in a relationship only for sex. The chorus finds Levine bewitched by someone he knows he shouldn't be with: "So I cross my heart and I hope to die / That I'll only stay with you one more night / And I know I said it a million times / But I'll only stay with you one more night."

== Critical reception ==
The song received mixed reviews from music critics. Bill Lamb of About.com gave the song four out of five stars, praising "the catchy reggae-drenched musical production" and "Adam Levine's confident pop vocals". However, he wrote: "Adam Levine's singing about being guilt-ridden over his part in relationship hell above a sunny musical production is feeling somewhat like formula. However, for now, enjoy the song's simple charms, and there will be much more to examine when the album Overexposed hits stores." Robert Copsey of Digital Spy called it "a bouncy, reggae-flecked midtempo with a chorus that feels reassuringly familiar."

Rick Florino of Artist Direct wrote a very positive review, describing the song:

Kicking off with a reggae-style guitar on 'One More Night', the album starts on a subtle yet sharp note. The push-and-pull of the tumultuous relationship described in the lyrics belies just how slick and swaggering the song's hook is. Mickey Madden's bass is tight and groovy, while James Valentine's riffing reaches its most diverse and dynamic heights yet on this offering. Matt Flynn lays down some staggering beats, and PJ Morton's keyboards color the soundscapes vibrantly. At the center of this instrumental majesty, Levine reaches another level reaching the status of legend alongside Bono and Anthony Kiedis, merging genres while effectively forging something fresh altogether.

Robbie Daw was divided with the song, writing: "On one hand, the employment of these slang terms du jour seem a bit of out of character for the Cali band. But then again, this album is exec-produced by Max Martin – so say hello to the new, (even more so) commercially-viable Maroon 5." Fraser McAlpine from BBC Music wrote a more mixed review, commenting: "One More Night's melody can’t go more than a bar or two without repeating – as if the band is worried it may forget itself – or getting stuck on a Morse code note for a while, just like a Rihanna song would." Simon Price from The Independent stated that the song is "a piece of electro-reggae that makes Ace of Base sound like Lee "Scratch" Perry.

== Chart performance ==
The song debuted at number 42 on the Billboard Hot 100, for the issue dated July 7, 2012. It also debuted at number 12 on the Digital Songs chart. The song debuted at number 30 on the Billboard Adult Pop Songs chart. For the week ending August 18, 2012, the song was the greatest gainer on the Billboard Pop Songs chart, at number 20. At the same issue, the song was the "Airplay Gainer" and climbed from 54 to number 30 on the Billboard Hot 100 chart. For the week ending August 25, 2012, the song moved from number 30 to number 15, becoming the "Digital Gainer". For the week ending September 1, 2012, the song leaped from number 15 to number 8, becoming the "Digital and Streaming Gainer". For the week ending September 9, 2012, the song placed number four and was the "Digital Gainer" of the week, selling 195,000 copies. It ranked second on the Digital Songs chart (first was Taylor Swift's "We Are Never Ever Getting Back Together"). For the week ending September 16, 2012, "One More Night" lifted from number 4 to number 3 on the Hot 100 with the chart's top "Airplay and Streaming Gainer" awards, as it pushes 16–13 on Radio Songs (61 million) and 19–11 on On-Demand Songs (516,000). Having been the Hot 100's top Digital Gainer the previous three weeks, it has won a combination of the three badges in each of the last five frames. On Digital Songs, it spent a second week at number two (193,000 copies) and passed a million in sales to date. The song also gained the "Greatest Gainer" status for reaching number 8 on the Pop Songs chart.

For the week of September 29, 2012, the song reached number one on the Billboard Hot 100 chart, in its 13th week on the chart. It became their third number-one single – the band had previously reigned with "Makes Me Wonder" for three weeks in 2007 and with "Moves Like Jagger", featuring Christina Aguilera, for four weeks in 2011. For the week of October 6, 2012, the song spent a second week at number one, with a 7% increase to 205,000 downloads sold in the chart's tracking week, according to Nielsen SoundScan. For the week of October 13, 2012, the song spent a third week at the top, with top Airplay Gainer honors for a fifth consecutive week, as it held at number 2 in its 10th week on the Radio Songs chart with a 15% increase to 116 million all-format audience impressions, according to Nielsen BDS. In its fourth week at the top, the song bested "Gangnam Style" by Psy by fewer than 700 overall chart points. In its fifth week at the top, it increased 5%, with 131 million all-format audience impressions. At nine weeks on top, it is also Maroon 5's longest Hot 100 reign, besting the four-week stint of "Moves Like Jagger" in 2011. On November 25, 2012, the song was beaten by Rihanna with her single "Diamonds". By March 2013, the song had sold over 4 million digital copies in the United States. As of June 2014, it has sold more than 4,635,000 copies in the US.

The song debuted at number 27 on the Canadian Hot 100 chart for the issue dated July 7, 2012. The following week, the song became the "Biggest Free Faller", dropping from number 27 to number 60. After a week fluctuating on the chart, the song climbed to number 50, on July 28, 2012. After another week fluctuating on the chart, the song jumped from number 52 to number 31. For the week ending August 25, 2012, the song earned the "Digital Gainer" title as it lifted from number 17 to number 8. For the week ending September 1, 2012, the song rose to number 6. For the issue dated September 15, 2012, the song leaped to number 3, becoming their fifth top-three single. It has since peaked at number 2 for six non-consecutive weeks.

"One More Night" debuted at number 22 on the Australian ARIA Singles Chart issue dated July 22, 2012. The following week, the song climbed from number 22 to number 7. For the week ending August 5, 2012, the song remained at number 4. For the week ending August 12, 2012, the song moved to number 2, tying with the peak position of their previous two singles "Payphone" and "Moves Like Jagger". On the New Zealand Singles Chart, the song debuted at number 21, moved from 21 to number 3 and reached number one. It remained at the top for three consecutive weeks, before falling to number 2, where it stayed for two consecutive weeks. In Sweden, the song debuted at number 43 on the Sverigetopplistan chart. Later, it jumped to number 28, while in its third week, it climbed to number 18. It later peaked at number 5.

The song spent two consecutive weeks at number 8 on the UK Singles Chart on the weeks ending October 27, 2012 and November 3, 2012. It spent 28 weeks in the top 100, 15 of which were in the top 40.

== Music video ==
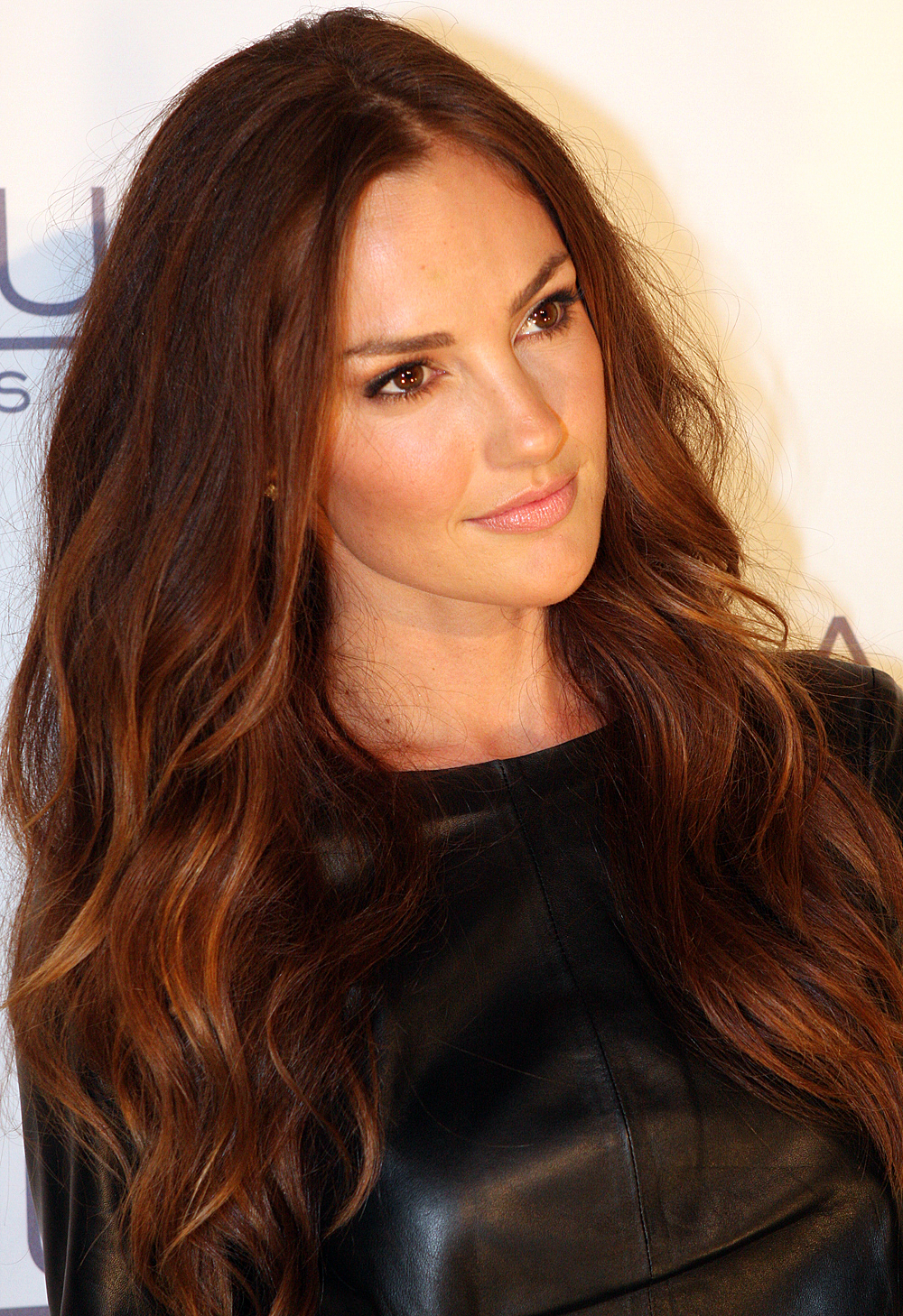
Minka Kelly plays Levine's girlfriend in the video.

The music video for "One More Night" was directed by Peter Berg. The video premiered on June 25, 2012, on MTV at 7:53 PM (EST). Following the premiere, Adam Levine participated in a live half-hour webchat on MTV.com with journalist James Montgomery to talk about the video. Actress Minka Kelly plays Levine's love interest in the video. "I play a heartbreaker, I guess", she said in the clip. "I do very bad things... but necessary". The tone of the video is supposedly dark, about him leaving the girl to be a boxing champ and her leaving him because she's fed up. The band members appear in the video and play as characters, with PJ Morton as Levine's boxing cutman, James Valentine as the promoter, Matt Flynn as the trainer of Levine's boxer opponent, and Mickey Madden as the boxing announcer. Levine's assistant manager Shawn Tellez also appears as his trainer in the video. As of November 2022, the video reached 1 billion views on YouTube.

=== Synopsis ===
The video for "One More Night" opens with two goldfish swimming around in a spheric bowl before segueing into a sequence where the seemingly idyllic home life Levine enjoys with his girlfriend (Kelly) and their baby daughter is set against scenes of his hands being wrapped and of him training in a boxing ring. At home, he eats a protein-heavy meal and revels in his baby girl's laughter as he holds her high in the air. But all is not well, as frequent cuts to Kelly's concerned frown let on. The writing is on the wall when he has to leave for a big fight and before he leaves, he pretends to soft box his baby daughter. As he steps into the ring to cheers, she packs her bags. He wins the fight, but when he returns home battered from the battle, he finds he's lost everything that really mattered. Kelly and their child are gone and all that's left are the relics of his profession – trophies, a jump rope, a few pictures and a lone goldfish.

=== Reception ===
John Mitchell of MTV News commented: "The clip could be looked at as a metaphor for the difficulties Levine faces balancing his professional life as a world-famous singer and TV star and a personal life with the same wants (happy relationship, a family) as everyone else." He further added: "Perhaps the video is a lingering response to his recent breakup from model Anne Vyalitsyna. Robbie Daw of Idolator agreed, writing: "We wouldn’t be surprised to find out that the breakup had some impact on the theme for the video." However, Daw noted: "The visual, for the most part, strays from the song’s lyrics, which seem to describe a man trying to resist the sexual charms of a woman he realizes he’s not compatible with." Rolling Stone stated: "Despite the track's laid-back reggae sound, the clip is quite emotionally heavy." Alexandra Carpototo of PopCrush commented: "We couldn’t even fathom leaving him; and him playing a father just makes us want him even more. There’s just something so hot about a bruised Adam Levine (both physically and emotionally)."

Ray Rahman of Entertainment Weekly's Music Mix wrote that "You might expect an epic music video – the 'Payphone' clip was a mini action film, after all – but the concept is on the subdued side." Melinda Newman of HitFix thought that "The clip is beautifully shot and Levine gets to show off his boxing chops and his abs, but it's a pretty tepid affair all around." Emily Exton of Pop Dust commented about the end of the video, writing "Considering he boxes for a living, we'll allow five minutes of wallowing before making requisite 'get back in the ring!' comments in reference to his dating life. Yes, she's left him and yes, this is the woman who inflicted her Helen of Troy-like powers across the entire Lonestar State, but isn't it always on to the next one? Good thing Levine loves ladies so much."

== Live performances ==
Maroon 5 performed "One More Night" for the first time on May 18, 2012, at the Revel Casino and Hotel in Atlantic City, New Jersey. The band also performed the song during their special concert at the Ed Sullivan Theater in New York, which was a part of the Live on Letterman concert series on June 26, 2012 – that was the day of the world premiere of the Overexposed album – and on The Today Show, on June 29, 2012, where they also performed their songs "Payphone", "Moves Like Jagger" and "Harder to Breathe".

On October 19, 2012, the band played "One More Night" at Orpheum Theatre in Los Angeles. Later, Maroon 5 continued with the song on Today again (October 25), during frontman Adam Levine's live appearance and on Saturday Night Live (along with "Daylight") on November 17. In December 2012, the band performed "One More Night" in the television special The Grammy Nominations Concert Live, with a medley of their songs "Moves Like Jagger" and "Daylight". In 2013, Maroon 5 performed the song in two events at Las Vegas including the Consumer Electronics Show on January 7, and the 2013 iHeartRadio Music Festival on September 21. The band played "One More Night" at the 2014 MTV Video Music Awards on August 24, 2014. The song was performed for respective concert tours, the Overexposed Tour and the 2013 Honda Civic Tour.

== Track listings ==
Digital download
No.	Title	Length
1.	"One More Night"	3:39

Remixes EP
No.	Title	Length
1.	"One More Night" (LVLF Remix)	5:01
2.	"One More Night" (Com Truise Remix)	5:21
3.	"One More Night" (Benji Boko Remix)	3:55
4.	"One More Night" (Seamus Haji Remix)	6:00

== Charts ==
=== Weekly charts ===
Weekly chart performance
Chart (2012–2013)	Peak position
Australia (ARIA)	2
Austria (Ö3 Austria Top 40)	8
Belgium (Ultratop 50 Flanders)	16
Belgium (Ultratop 50 Wallonia)	15
Bulgaria Airplay (BAMP)	1
Canada Hot 100 (Billboard)	2
Canada AC (Billboard)	1
Canada CHR/Top 40 (Billboard)	1
Canada Hot AC (Billboard)	1
CIS Airplay (TopHit)	54
Czech Republic Airplay (ČNS IFPI)	2
Denmark (Tracklisten)	8
Euro Digital Song Sales (Billboard)	7
Finland (Suomen virallinen lista)	2
France (SNEP)	9
Germany (GfK)	17
Honduras (Honduras Top 50)	15
Hungary (Rádiós Top 40)	8
Ireland (IRMA)	16
Italy (FIMI)	13
Italian Airplay (EarOne)	8
Japan Hot 100 (Billboard)	47
Lebanon (OLT20)	2
Mexico (Billboard Mexican Airplay)	5
Mexico Anglo (Monitor Latino)	2
Netherlands (Dutch Top 40)	15
Netherlands (Single Top 100)	23
New Zealand (Recorded Music NZ)	1
Norway (VG-lista)	7
Poland Airplay (ZPAV)	5
Russia Airplay (TopHit)	79
Scottish Singles Sales (Official Charts)	7
Slovakia Airplay (ČNS IFPI)	49
South Korea (Gaon Digital Chart)	15
Spain (Promusicae)	25
Sweden (Sverigetopplistan)	5
Switzerland (Schweizer Hitparade)	11
UK Radio Airplay (Nielsen Soundscan)	2
UK Singles (Official Charts)	8 (Note: When "One More Night" peaked on the UK Singles Chart, it was sales-only. Streaming data was not incorporated until July 2014.)
UK Streaming (Official Charts)	7
Ukraine Airplay (TopHit)	17
US Billboard Hot 100	1
US Adult Contemporary (Billboard)	2
US Adult Pop Airplay (Billboard)	1
US Dance Airplay (Billboard)	8
US Hot Latin Songs (Billboard)	29
US Pop Airplay (Billboard)	1
US Rhythmic Airplay (Billboard)	11

=== Year-end charts ===
Year-end chart performance
Chart (2012)	Position
Australia (ARIA)	18
Belgium (Ultratop 50 Wallonia)	100
Brazil (Crowley)	93
Canada (Canadian Hot 100)	25
France (SNEP)	86
Hungary (Rádiós Top 40)	67
Italy (FIMI)	66
Netherlands (Dutch Top 40)	52
Netherlands (Mega Single Top 100)	77
New Zealand (RIANZ)	12
South Korea (Gaon Chart)	96
South Korea (Gaon Chart (International))	4
Sweden (Sverigetopplistan)	36
Ukraine Airplay (TopHit)	121
UK Singles (OCC)	72
US Billboard Hot 100	18
US Adult Pop Songs	29
US Mainstream Top 40	20

Year-end chart performance
Chart (2013)	Position
Canada (Canadian Hot 100)	40
Spain Radio (PROMUSICAE)	49
Ukraine Airplay (TopHit)	84
US Billboard Hot 100	38
US Radio Songs	23
US Adult Contemporary (Billboard)	19
US Adult Pop Airplay (Billboard)	31
US Pop Airplay (Billboard)	43

Year-end chart performance
Chart (2024)	Position
Hungary (Rádiós Top 40)	92

Year-end chart performance
Chart (2025)	Position
Hungary (Rádiós Top 40)	91

=== Decade-end charts ===
2010s-end chart performance for "One More Night"
Chart (2010–2019)	Position
US Billboard Hot 100	28

=== All-time charts ===
All-time chart performance
Chart	Position
US Billboard Pop Songs (1992–2017)	11
US Billboard Hot 100 (1958–2018)	110

== Certifications ==
Certifications
Region	Certification	Certified units/sales
Australia (ARIA)	9× Platinum	630,000^{‡}
Brazil (Pro-Música Brasil)	2× Diamond	500,000^{‡}
Canada (Music Canada)	6× Platinum	480,000^{*}
Denmark (IFPI Danmark)	Gold	15,000^{^}
Germany (BVMI)	Gold	150,000^{‡}
Italy (FIMI)	Platinum	30,000^{*}
Mexico (AMPROFON)	Platinum+Gold	90,000^{*}
New Zealand (RMNZ)	4× Platinum	120,000^{‡}
South Korea (Gaon Chart)	—	2,086,680
Spain (Promusicae)	Platinum	60,000^{‡}
Sweden (GLF)	2× Platinum	80,000^{‡}
Switzerland (IFPI Switzerland)	Gold	15,000^{^}
United Kingdom (BPI)	2× Platinum	1,200,000^{‡}
United States (RIAA)	6× Platinum	6,000,000
Streaming
Denmark (IFPI Danmark)	2× Platinum	3,600,000^{†}
^{*} Sales figures based on certification alone.^{^} Shipments figures based on certification alone.^{‡} Sales+streaming figures based on certification alone.^{†} Streaming-only figures based on certification alone.

== Release history ==
Release dates for "One More Night"
Region	Date	Format	Ref.
United States	June 19, 2012	Digital download	
United States	July 17, 2012	Contemporary hit radio	
Germany	September 21, 2012	CD	
United Kingdom	October 28, 2012	Digital remix EP	
