= Overexposed (album) =

Studio album by Maroon 5
- Released: June 20, 2012
- Recorded: Mid 2011 – Early 2012
- Studios: Conway, Hollywood, California
- Genres: Pop; dance-pop; electropop
- Length: 42:10
- Label: A&M Octone
- Producers: Benny Blanco; D.J. Kyriakides; Sam Farrar; Shawn Kang; Adam Levine; Maroon 5; Max Martin; MdL; Noah "Mailbox" Passovoy; Matthew Rappold; Robopop; JR Rotem; Shellback; Sam Spiegel; Ryan Tedder; James Valentine; Brian "Sweetwesty" West; Noel Zancanella

Maroon 5 chronology
Hands All Over (2010)	Overexposed (2012)	V (2014)

Singles from Overexposed
- 1. "Payphone" Released: April 16, 2012; 2. "One More Night" Released: June 19, 2012; 3. "Daylight" Released: November 27, 2012; 4. "Love Somebody" Released: May 14, 2013

Overexposed is the fourth studio album by the American rock band Maroon 5. It was released on June 20, 2012, by A&M Octone Records. The album was recorded between 2011 and 2012 and was driven by the moderate success of their third album, Hands All Over (2010), and later by the enormous success of the re-released edition, which was promoted by the single "Moves like Jagger", recorded featuring Christina Aguilera. It is the band's only album not to feature keyboardist, rhythm guitarist and background vocalist Jesse Carmichael, who took a temporary break from performing with the group to focus on his studies and was replaced by musician PJ Morton. The band worked with different producers, such as Max Martin, who serves as the album's executive producer, Ryan Tedder of OneRepublic, Shellback and Benny Blanco.

The accompanying artwork, created by Los Angeles artist Young & Sick, is a colorful collage of illustrations seemingly inspired by the likes of Picasso and a range of modern cartoonists. Its title is a smirking allusion to Levine's ubiquity, while its sound is a reflection of how the group wishes to retain the large audience they won once again with "Moves Like Jagger". The album's lead single "Payphone", featuring rapper Wiz Khalifa, produced by Shellback and Benny Blanco, was released and performed on The Voice, on April 16, 2012. The song was a success, reaching number 2 on the Billboard Hot 100 chart, as well as on the ARIA Charts, while it topped the UK Singles Chart, Canadian Hot 100 and Italian Singles Chart. The second single "One More Night", was released on June 19, 2012. The song topped the Billboard Hot 100 for nine weeks, becoming their longest Hot 100 reign. The following singles, "Daylight" and "Love Somebody", peaked within the Hot 100's Top 10.

The album was met with mixed reception from music critics. Some praised the album, calling it their strongest effort, but others criticized the direction the band decided to take, calling it a failed attempt to go mainstream. Additionally, critics and fans alike perceived the album as overly focused on Levine. It debuted at number 2 on both the UK Albums Chart – selling 38,000 copies – and the US Billboard 200 chart – selling 222,000 copies. According to the International Federation of the Phonographic Industry (IFPI), Overexposed was the 11th global best-selling album of 2012 with sales of 2.2 million copies. To promote the album, the band embarked on the Overexposed Tour (2012–2014).

== Background ==
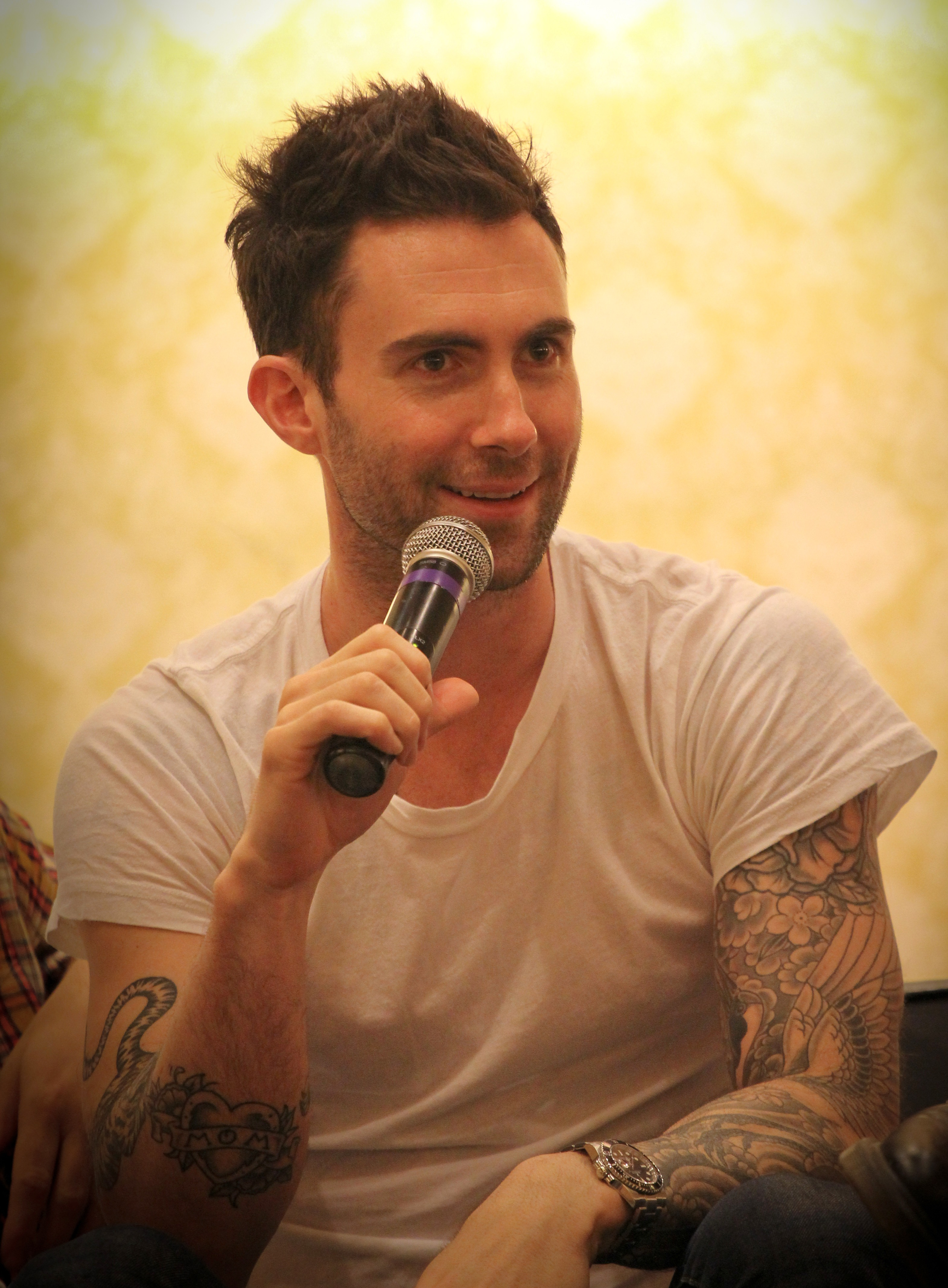
According to Adam Levine, Hands All Over experienced moderate commercial success because of its sound and the location in which it was recorded (Vevey, Switzerland).

In September 2010, the band released their third studio album, Hands All Over. While preparing the album, the band received a phone call from Robert John "Mutt" Lange, who had heard the band was beginning to write a new record, and expressed an interest in producing it. The album received generally favorable reviews from music critics and debuted at number 2 on the US Billboard 200 chart. However, the album experienced moderate success in overall sales; regarding that, Maroon 5's guitarist James Valentine expressed some frustration and said that a new album may be coming sooner than was originally planned. Valentine further commented:

"It would be nice to start working on another record next year". "I think with the last two records, it's been a little bit unbalanced, in that we had so much success and there was so much of the world to cover that our studio/road balance was a little off... In a perfect world we'd tour for six months and maybe record for six months, but that's not the way it works. But the whole point is to make more music, and if anything you can spend too much time out there."

Valentine also said the band has "tons of material" available, including holdovers including songs from Hands All Over and also other tracks the band has written since then. "I think everybody's been pretty busy compiling ideas for the next one," he stated. "With technology and the recording capacity we have on our laptops, we can be a little more prolific while we're [touring]. We've never been able to do that before. I think we could go in and make a record today and have a pretty solid album." In July 2011, the band re-released Hands All Over and included a new song called "Moves Like Jagger" which featured American singer Christina Aguilera. The song enjoyed a massive commercial success reaching number 1 on over 22 national singles chart including on the US Billboard Hot 100. In an interview with Mike Wood of Los Angeles Times, Levine explained what went wrong on Hands All Over, "I don't think we knew what kind of record we were making. It was such a hodgepodge — all these disparate ideas and songs that didn't make any sense together. He also stated, "We were in this idyllic paradise, which is a horrible place to make a record. Switzerland's neutrality is very famous, and I feel like that neutrality infected Maroon 5's third album". Levine further stated that "Moves Like Jagger" saved them and totally revived the group. Also in 2011, keyboardist and guitarist Jesse Carmichael stated "I hope that what happens on this next record is that we go even further into different directions and music and just keep branching out so that the record is incredibly diverse. You know, I think people's attention spans are getting shorter as time goes on, and so we're gonna make a quick, concise but super-diverse album."

== Recording and production ==
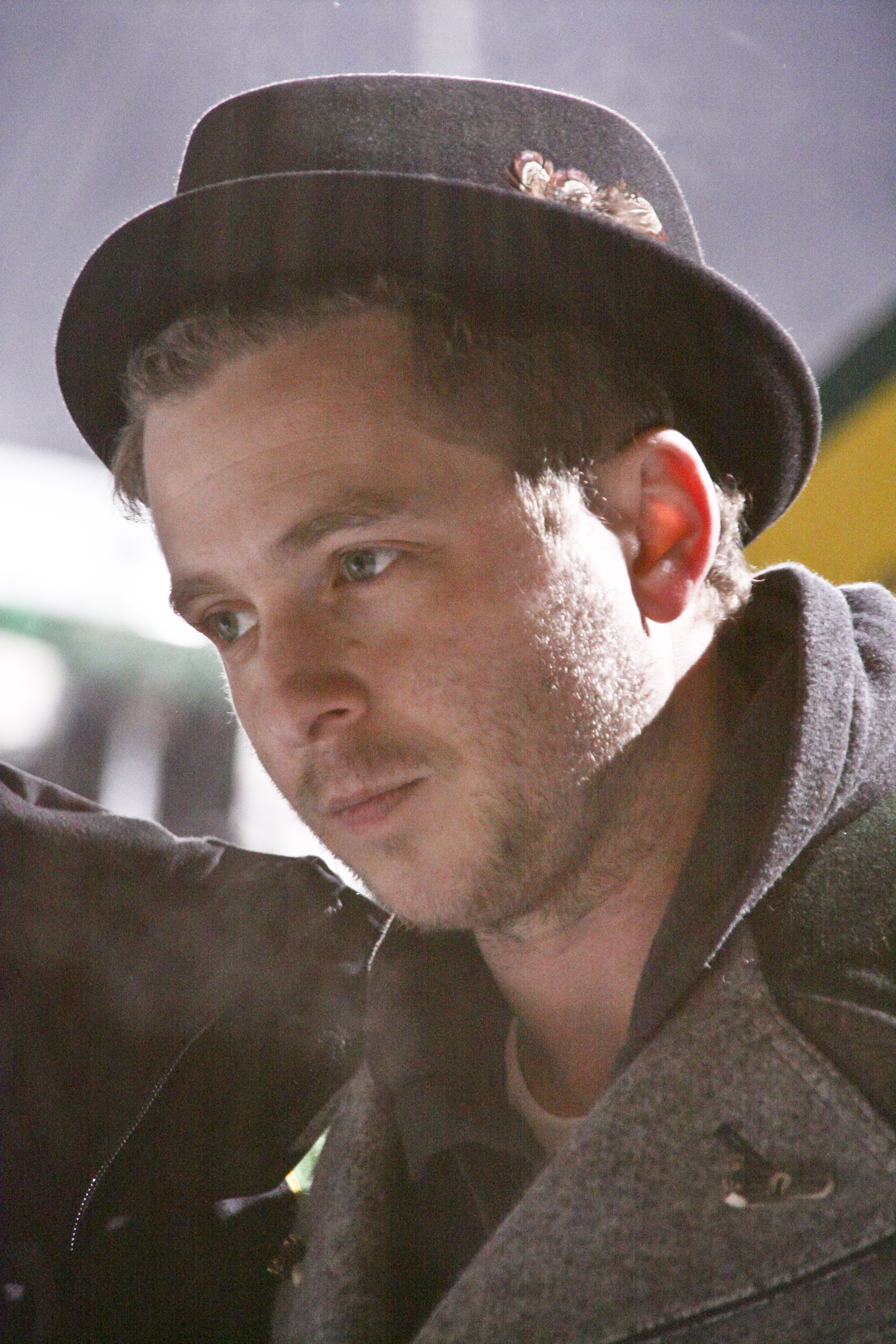
According to Ryan Tedder, Overexposed contains a fresh sound.

The band started writing songs for Overexposed during their latest tour in support of Hands All Over. After concluding with the tour, the band recorded the material of the album at the Conway Recording Studios located in Los Angeles, California. Notably not joining them would be founding member Jesse Carmichael, who announced he would be taking a hiatus from the group on March 9, 2012, and would return after the touring cycle for their upcoming fourth album finished. Speaking about the development on the band's material, Valentine revealed that "Moves Like Jagger" was the first time the band worked with an outside writer, so they decided to implement it more on Overexposed. "At this point in our career I think it was a good thing to completely mix up our process and it yielded good results, as well as a more collaborative spirit within the band. We wanted to make something that sounded contemporary with the elements of a lot of early eras of pop music" explained Valentine. On the development of the album, Levine also commented, "Overexposed is definitely our most diverse and poppiest album yet. We had a great time recording it. I can't wait for our fans to hear the record, as well as hitting the road to play it live for everyone later this year." In another interview for Rolling Stone, the singer revealed that is their most dance-driven album ever, commenting: "It's very much an old-fashioned disco tune. I have a love/hate relationship with it – but mostly I love it."

The album was executively produced by Max Martin, with additional tracks produced by Benny Blanco and Ryan Tedder. Tedder commented that the sound of the songs was very fresh and would affect kids. However, he further stated, "maintaining that interest — that's the hardest thing in the world." Blanco explained that he and Levine first met during recording the song "Stereo Hearts" by Gym Class Heroes on which Levine is featured. The producer explained that when Levine heard the song he solely wanted in for himself on which Blanco responded that they will make another track for the band. After producing "Moves Like Jagger", he also worked on Overexposed and produced some songs including the lead single of the album, "Payphone". Although new collaborators were recruited to help in developing the album, Levine wrote all the songs with additional help from Valentine and produced a large portion of it, including the ballad "Sad". According to Valentine, the development of the song began one morning, when he woke up and "before he was even awake" he was at his living room's piano playing the melody. For an interview with MTV News, Levine told that "Sad" is his most personal track on the album, but didn't reveal the inspiration behind it. "Lady Killer" and "Fortune Teller" both started as just song titles thought of by bassist Mickey Madden before the songs were written (the guitar solo from "Ladykiller" was taken from an earlier track titled "Locked Up"). Most of "Ladykiller" was written by Valentine while the band was on tour, and was demoed on Logic Pro X. The song remained mostly unchanged from the demo, with minor touchups to the lyrics and music by Levine, and a guitar solo added from an old song the band recorded under the name Kara's Flowers titled "Locked Up (Pleasure Fucker)".

== Composition ==
=== Influence and sound ===
Overexposed is a pop, dance-pop, and electropop album with pop rock, disco, R&B, and reggae influences. According to the band's official website, the album is "a chock-full collection of undeniable, anthemic melodies." Multiple critics stated that "Moves Like Jagger" served as the biggest influence for composing and writing most songs on Overexposed. Additionally, they noted that the works by Barbadian recording artist Rihanna influenced the album's sound.

=== Songs and lyrics ===
"Lucky Strike"
A sample of "Lucky Strike", a funk song that contains instrumentation consisted of piano, "driven guitar" accompanied with Levine's vocals.

The album's opening track, "One More Night", is an "irresistible sexy reggae jam" that features influences of pop and rock music. Lyrically, the storyline follows or being able to untangle from the particular love interest. The second track on the album, "Payphone" is a pop and R&B song that contains hip hop beats and piano hooks. Featuring a verse by American rapper Wiz Khalifa, the song explores the way a relationship used to be in the past. "Daylight" is a soft rock song, that carries influence from the works of English band Coldplay (who, incidentally, also have a song called "Daylight"). According to Adam Markovitz of Entertainment Weekly, the song has choruses that are thickly produced and the only physical instrument that you can pick is Levine's larynx. "Lucky Strike" is a funk song that features dubstep and soul rock influences and lyrically discovers the theme of sexual intercourse. The fifth track on the album, "The Man Who Never Lied", produced by Brian West, is a pop and pop rock song that finds the protagonist in a relationship trouble where he is playing the role of a good person. According to Nate Chinen of The New York Times, in the song, Levine sings "about spoiling his perfect record of honesty to spare a quarreling lover some hurtful feelings." "Love Somebody" is the sixth track on the album; a dance-pop song it contains a Sly Stone-meets-Eurythmics synth hook. The funk-laden seventh song, "Ladykiller" features a guitar solo and an elastic funk groove, combined with Adam Levine's blue-eyed soul vocal and pleasing echoes of Hall & Oates. It was inspired by the work of American recording artist Michael Jackson, as noted by the reviewers of BBC Music and Virgin Media.

"Sad"
"Sad" is a piano ballad, which highlights Levine's soulful tone that his voice possesses. and is reminiscent of the works by Adele.

The eighth song on the album, "Fortune Teller" has a pop tempo piano beat, that meshes with the song to provide a mix of emotions. The song gives a sort of "I want you, but I can't decide for you" feel. "Sad" is a piano ballad, which highlights Levine's soulful tone that his voice possesses. Nick Levine of NME labeled the song as "an Adele-apeing weepie". Lyrically, "Sad" is a song on which Levine "achingly" declares the end of his relationship and his heartbreak. The tenth track "Tickets" features twisting production that "comes through as a tight, techno-influenced pop song". According to a reviewer of Billboard, the song is reminiscent of Maroon 5's 2010 single "Give a Little More" and it has lyrics about someone being a snob. "Doin' Dirt" is a high-energy, beat-driven song, and a "a revved, funky club cut". Its verses talk about "horndog rhapsodies", with lyrics such as: "I light you up when I get inside". The final track on the album, "Beautiful Goodbye" was described as a "rhythmic ballad." It's an acoustic ode that's bittersweet, but at the same time positive.

Three additional tracks are present on the deluxe edition of Overexposed, including "Wipe Your Eyes", "Wasted Years" and either "Kiss", a cover of the 1986 single by Prince and the Revolution, or a cover of Let's Stay Together by Al Green. "Wipe Your Eyes" is a mid-tempo piano-driven track that contains a sample of the recording "Sabali" by the Mali musical duo Amadou & Mariam. The song charted at number 80 on the US Billboard 200. "Wasted Years" first appeared 7 years prior on the group's live album Live – Friday the 13th (2005). This version of the song was more in line with the funk rock the group were playing at that time. The song, contrary to popular belief, was not written for Songs About Jane, but instead for the band's eventual softmore album. A demo of the song similar to the demos featured on the 10th Anniversary edition of Songs About Jane was recorded by Adam Levine and Sam Farrar, but has not been released. The version of "Wasted Years" on this album has slightly different lyrics and very different instrumentation. It also contains a sample of "The Rill Thing" by Little Richard.

== Artwork ==
On April 10, 2012, the band debuted the artwork of the album on their official website. Created by the LA based art project Young & Sick, the cover art doesn't feature any images of Maroon 5 and is instead a colorful collage of illustrations seemingly inspired by the likes of Picasso and a range of modern cartoonists. According to Natalie Finn from E! News, "the psychedelic Beatles-dipped-in-Cream cover is a where-do-you-look-first wink at the pop-music world, which is so crowded with egos and images these days that it becomes almost impossible to just focus on the music." Allison Bowsher of MuchMusic described the artwork as a combination of the 1967 album Sgt. Pepper's Lonely Hearts Club Band by The Beatles and illustrations of American show The Simpsons. The reviewer further noted that this is second time the band uses similar illustration the first one being on their 2002 debut album Songs About Jane. Jessica Sager from Pop Crush wrote, "the bright colors and cartoon images are representative of the album's themes." Similarly, Rebecca Francois of Global Grind wrote that the artwork is like Maroon 5's music "fun and pop". Becky Bain of website Idolator, negatively reviewed the cover and wrote that "it is what an episode of The Simpsons looks like if you're on acid."

== Singles ==
"Payphone" featuring Wiz Khalifa was released as the lead single from the album on April 16, 2012. The song received generally positive reviews from critics, they noted departure from older Maroon 5 songs. However, some them were praised of the music direction where the band has taken. Magazine Rolling Stone placed "Payphone" at number 46 on their list of 50 Best Songs of 2012. Commercially, the song reached number 1 on over eight national singles charts and peaked within the Top 10 on 20 additional charts. "Payphone" reached number 2 on the US Billboard Hot 100 and number 1 on the UK Singles Chart. It was the fifth best selling single of 2012 with over 9.1 million digital copies sold worldwide. The music video of "Payphone" premiered on May 9, 2012, on E! and was directed by Samuel Bayer. The video features Levine being mistaken for a bank robber and fighting a fleet of policemen.

"One More Night" was released as the second single from the album on June 19, 2012. The song received generally positive reviews from critics who praised "the catchy reggae-drenched musical production" and "Adam Levine's confident pop vocals". "One More Night" reached the Top 10 on over 26 national charts worldwide. It topped the US Billboard Hot 100 for nine consecutive weeks becoming Maroon 5's longest topping single on the chart and was tied with "Call Me Maybe" by Carly Rae Jepsen for longest lead of the year. The music video of "One More Night" premiered on June 25, 2012, on MTV and was directed by Peter Berg. The video follows Levine's character being a boxer whose relationship is in ruins because of his profession, his love interest is played by American actress Minka Kelly.

"Daylight" was released as the third single from the album on November 27, 2012. The song received generally mixed reviews from critics with Cameron Adams of Herald Sun noting that "it sounds like Max Martin trying to write a Coldplay song by recycling his Backstreet Boys handiwork." "Daylight" reached the Top 10 on over eight national charts worldwide including number 7 on the US Billboard Hot 100 and number 5 on the Canadian Hot 100. Two music videos of the song are released, the first video titled "The Daylight Project", features fans express things they love and hate throughout the video and was directed by Jonas Åkerlund. A second video titled "Playing for Change", is directed by Mark Johnson. This video includes several street musicians from around the world to sing along and playing instruments with scenes of the band performing live on concert shows.

The fourth and final single from the album "Love Somebody" was released in the US contemporary hit radio on May 14, 2013. The song was received with mixed reviews from critics who praised the composition but were critical towards to Levine's vocals of the song. "Love Somebody" reached number 10 both on the Canadian Hot 100 and on the US Billboard Hot 100. A music video for the song was directed by Rich Lee and premiered on NBC on May 20, following The Voice. It features Levine, the other members of the band and his love interest (played by Emily Ratajkowski) covered in paint.

=== Promotional singles ===
"Lucky Strike" was released on January 20, 2014, in Belgium, as the album's first and only promotional single. The song peaked on many different charts, including number 2 on the singles chart in South Korea and number 9 on the US Billboard Bubbling Under Hot 100 chart.

== Promotion and touring ==
To promote the album, Maroon 5 performed many songs on the Late Show with David Letterman, on June 26, 2012. The band promoted the album on The Today Show, on June 29, 2012. They performed the hits "Payphone", "One More Night, "Moves Like Jagger" and "Harder to Breathe". Adam Levine gave an interview and performed "Payphone" with the band on Late Night with Jimmy Fallon, on June 28.

The band started the Overexposed Tour with 4 shows in Mexico. 3 of them sold out, with the first show being on August 14, 2012, in Monterrey, Nuevo Leon, Mexico. In August, they performed 3 shows in Brazil and visited three other South American countries. Through September and October, they visited many East Asian countries, including: South Korea, Philippines, Malaysia, Singapore, Hong Kong, Taiwan, Japan, Indonesia and Thailand. The tour also included two shows in Sydney and Melbourne, Australia in October 2012. On September 7, 2012, Levine announced that the band would be extending the tour and play some more shows, starting in early 2013. Apparently, an extra eight shows in Istanbul, Auckland, Bogota, Madrid, Warsaw, Caracas and Quito were planned, but this ultimately never came to fruition. On October 22, 2012, Levine revealed the U.S. tour dates and stated that Neon Trees and Owl City, will be supporting them throughout the U.S. tour. The tour ended on January 20, 2014, in Amsterdam, Netherlands, comprising 70 shows.

== Critical reception ==
Professional ratings
Aggregate scores
Source	Rating
AnyDecentMusic?	4.6/10
Metacritic	54/100
Review scores
Source	Rating
AllMusic	3/5 stars
American Songwriter	3/5 stars
Entertainment Weekly	C+
The Guardian	3/5 stars
The Independent	3/5 stars
musicOMH	3/5 stars
NME	5/10
PopMatters	5/10
Rolling Stone	3.5/5 stars
Spin	4/10

Overexposed received generally mixed reviews from music critics. At Metacritic, which assigns a normalized rating out of 100 to reviews from mainstream critics, the album received an average score of 54, based on 14 reviews. Evan Sawdey of PopMatters found it both interesting and flawed because of Maroon 5's attempt to pursue different ideas, which are ultimately unsuccessful. Caroline Sullivan of The Guardian said that the album lacks memorable hooks and "charm", despite Maroon 5's collaboration with popular producers. Adam Markowitz of Entertainment Weekly felt that the lyrics are poorly written and that its production by several "pop kingpins" detracts from the band's performance, as the album does not consolidate its "rock grit and dance-pop glitz". musicOMH's Martyn Young wrote that Maroon 5's pop-produced direction exposes their limitations and lacks subtlety. Andy Gill of The Independent found the album dull, unimaginative, and marred by inarticulate "whoah-oh-oh" hooks. Nick Levine of NME panned Adam Levine's singing and called him "the sort of chump who thinks that he's a 'player' but then goes and writes a song called 'Ladykiller' about, erm, a girl." Keith Harris of Spin found the album middling with "plaintive vulnerability" that lacks both distractions and highlights.

In a positive review for Rolling Stone, Rob Sheffield called Overexposed the band's best album yet and said that its first-rate, dulcet sound is complemented by sharp, womanizing lyrics. Nate Chinen of The New York Times felt that, although Levine sounds awkward when deviating from the slick style, the album further invests in their "glib" strengths, including Levine's supple voice. Stephen Thomas Erlewine, writing for AllMusic, said that the "briskly contemporary" album may not be as good as Hands All Over, but it will ensure the band's commercial momentum. American Songwriter magazine's Eric Allen believed that newer fans of the band from "today's beat oriented downloading musical culture" will be excited by Overexposed, although it may alienate their older fans and "music snobs".

== Commercial performance ==
Overexposed debuted at number 2 on the Billboard 200, behind Linkin Park's Living Things, with sales of 222,000 copies, according to Nielsen SoundScan. A little over 1,000 copies sold separates the two titles. Living Things also kept the album from reaching number 1 in many other countries. Overexposed is the band's fourth studio album, and follows 2010's Hands All Over, which also peaked at number 2, selling 142,000 in its first week. Overexposed's start marks the band's best sales week for an album since 2007's It Won't Be Soon Before Long debuted at number 1 with 429,000 copies. In the second week, the album fell to number 4, with sales of 68,000 copies. It fell out of Top 10 in its seventh week, but the album rose to number 5 in its eight-week, as the album benefitted from Amazon MP3 sale priced for $3.99 on August 17, 2012. It sold 988,000 copies in the US in 2012, the 11th best-selling album of the year. As of August 2013, it has sold 1,431,000 copies in the US.

By the end of 2012, the album had sold over 2 million copies worldwide.

In Canada, the album debuted at number 3 on the Canadian Albums Chart, selling 17,800 copies. The album has sold 30,000 copies in Brazil, being certified Gold. The album was certified Gold in Japan after selling 100,000+ copies. The album debuted at number 2 on the UK Albums Chart, selling 38,000 copies, becoming their third British bestseller. It was 3,000 copies behind of Linkin Park's Living Things, which debuted at number 1 with 41,000 copies. The album sold 263,000 copies in 2012 in the UK.

== Track listings ==
Overexposed – Standard edition
No.	Title	Writer(s)	Producer(s)	Length
1.	"One More Night"	Adam Levine; Shellback; Savan Kotecha; Max Martin	M. Martin; Shellback	3:39
2.	"Payphone" (featuring Wiz Khalifa)	Levine; Benjamin Levin; Ammar Malik; Dan Omelio; Shellback; Cameron Thomaz	Benny Blanco; Shellback; Robopop^{[a]}	3:51
3.	"Daylight"	Levine; M. Martin; Sam Martin; Mason Levy	Levine; MdL; M. Martin	3:45
4.	"Lucky Strike"	Levine; Ryan Tedder; Noel Zancanella	Tedder; Zancanella	3:05
5.	"The Man Who Never Lied"	Levine; Brian "Sweetwesty" West; Marius Moga	Noah "Mailbox" Passovoy; Levine; West^{[a]}	3:25
6.	"Love Somebody"	Levine; Tedder; Zancanella; Nathaniel Motte	Tedder; Zancanella	3:49
7.	"Ladykiller"	James Valentine; Mickey Madden; Levine	Passovoy; Valentine; Sam Farrar^{[a]}	2:44
8.	"Fortune Teller"	Valentine; Madden; Levine	Passovoy; Valentine; Farrar	3:23
9.	"Sad"	Levine; Valentine	Passovoy; Levine; Valentine	3:14
10.	"Tickets"	Valentine; Madden; Levine	Passovoy; Farrar	3:29
11.	"Doin' Dirt"	Levine; Shellback	Shellback	3:31
12.	"Beautiful Goodbye"	Levine; Levin; Malik	Blanco; D.J. Kyriakides^{[a]}; Matthew Rappold^{[a]}	4:15
Total length:				42:10

Overexposed – International standard edition (bonus track)
No.	Title	Writer(s)	Producer(s)	Length
13.	"Moves like Jagger" (featuring Christina Aguilera)	Levine; Levin; Malik; Shellback	Benny Blanco; Shellback	3:21
Total length:				45:31

Overexposed – Australian, Korean and digital deluxe edition (bonus tracks)
No.	Title	Writer(s)	Producer(s)	Length
13.	"Wipe Your Eyes"	Levine; Rotem; Golan; Kang; Albarn; Mariam Doumbia; Moreau	Rotem; Kang^{[a]}	3:34
14.	"Wasted Years"	Levine; Richard Penniman	Spiegel; Farrar^{[b]}	3:33
15.	"Let's Stay Together"	Al Green; Willie Mitchell; Al Jackson, Jr.	Passovoy	3:24
Total length:				52:41

Overexposed – Physical deluxe edition (bonus track)
No.	Title	Writer(s)	Producer(s)	Length
13.	"Wipe Your Eyes"	Levine; Rotem; Golan; Kang; Albarn; Mariam Doumbia; Moreau	Rotem; Kang^{[a]}	3:34
14.	"Wasted Years"	Levine; Penniman	Spiegel; Farrar^{[b]}	3:33
15.	"Kiss"	Prince	Maroon 5; Passovoy^{[a]}	7:00
Total length:				56:17

Overexposed – Japanese edition (bonus tracks)
No.	Title	Writer(s)	Producer(s)	Length
16.	"Moves like Jagger" (featuring Christina Aguilera)	Levine; Levin; Malik; Shellback	Benny Blanco; Shellback	3:21
17.	"Payphone" (Supreme Cuts Remix; featuring Wiz Khalifa)	Levine; Levin; Malik; Omelio; Shellback; Thomaz	Blanco; Shellback; Robopop^{[a]}	4:42
18.	"Payphone" (Cutmore Remix; featuring Wiz Khalifa)	Levine; Levin; Malik; Omelio; Shellback; Thomaz	Blanco; Shellback; Robopop^{[a]}	3:12
19.	"Payphone" (The Sound of Arrows Remix; featuring Wiz Khalifa)	Levine; Levin; Malik; Omelio; Shellback; Thomaz	Blanco; Shellback; Robopop^{[a]}	5:03
Total length:				72:35

Overexposed – Japanese limited edition (DVD)
No.	Title	Length
1.	"Moves like Jagger" (Music video)	4:39
2.	"Payphone" (music video; featuring Wiz Khalifa)	4:40
3.	"Overexposed EPK"

Notes

- ^{^a} signifies an additional producer
- ^{^b} signifies a co-producer
- "Wipe Your Eyes" contains a sample of the recording "Sabali", written by Damon Albarn, Mariam Doumbia and Marc Moreau, and performed by Amadou & Mariam.
- "Wasted Years" contains samples of "The Rill Thing", written and performed by "Little" Richard Penniman.

== Personnel ==
Maroon 5

- Adam Levine – vocals, guitars
- Mickey Madden – bass; backing vocals (3)
- James Valentine – guitars; programming & keyboards (7–10), backing vocals (7), sitar (13)
- Matt Flynn – drums
- PJ Morton – keyboards

Additional musicians

- Dan Omelio – guitars, keyboards, synthesizers, songwriting, production
- Benny Blanco – guitars, keyboards, synthesizers, songwriting, production
- Shellback – production, songwriting, guitars, keyboards, synthesizers, programming, drums, backing vocals
- Max Martin – backing vocals, guitars, keyboards, songwriting, production
- Ammar Malik – backing vocals, guitars, songwriting
- Wiz Khalifa – rap (featured guest on "Payphone")
- Brie Larson – backing vocals (tracks 3 and 10)
- Savannah Buffett – backing vocals
- Dan Keyes – backing vocals
- Z Berg – backing vocals
- Vanessa Long – backing vocals
- Sam Farrar – production, programming, backing vocals
- Mason "MdL" Levy – keyboards, drums, production
- Ryan Tedder – keyboards, songwriting, production
- Noel Zancanella – keyboards, songwriting, production
- Brian "Sweetwesty" West – guitar, programming, songwriting, production
- Noah "Mailbox" Passovoy – production, keyboards
- David Silberstein – wine glasses
- Scott Yarmovsky – wine glasses

== Charts ==
=== Weekly charts ===
Weekly chart performance for Overexposed
Chart (2012)	Peak position
Australian Albums (ARIA)	4
Austrian Albums (Ö3 Austria)	7
Belgian Albums (Ultratop Flanders)	18
Belgian Albums (Ultratop Wallonia)	16
Canadian Albums (Billboard)	3
Croatian International Albums (HDU)	4
Danish Albums (Hitlisten)	4
Dutch Albums (Album Top 100)	3
Finnish Albums (Suomen virallinen lista)	28
French Albums (SNEP)	5
German Albums (Offizielle Top 100)	4
Hungarian Albums (MAHASZ)	23
Irish Albums (IRMA)	3
Italian Albums (FIMI)	3
Japanese Albums (Oricon)	5
Mexican Albums (Top 100 Mexico)	3
New Zealand Albums (RMNZ)	3
Norwegian Albums (VG-lista)	6
Polish Albums (ZPAV)	42
Portuguese Albums (AFP)	5
Scottish Albums (Official Charts)	1
South Korean Albums (Circle)	4
South Korean International Albums (Circle)	1
Spanish Albums (Promusicae)	5
Swedish Albums (Sverigetopplistan)	33
Swiss Albums (Schweizer Hitparade)	7
Taiwan International Albums (G-Music)	1
UK Albums (Official Charts)	2
US Billboard 200	2
US Digital Albums (Billboard)	1
US Indie Store Album Sales (Billboard)	6

=== Year-end charts ===
2012 year-end chart performance for Overexposed
Chart (2012)	Position
Australian Albums (ARIA)	24
Canadian Albums (Billboard)	18
Danish Albums (Hitlisten)	51
French Albums (SNEP)	52
Japanese Albums (Oricon)	57
Mexican Albums (AMPROFON)	32
New Zealand Albums (RMNZ)	30
South Korean International Albums (Circle)	7
Swiss Albums (Schweizer Hitparade)	87
UK Albums (OCC)	29
US Billboard 200	21
Worldwide (IFPI)	10

2013 year-end chart performance for Overexposed
Chart (2013)	Position
Canadian Albums (Billboard)	35
French Albums (SNEP)	133
South Korean International Albums (Circle)	51
UK Albums (OCC)	153
US Billboard 200	22

2014 year-end chart performance for Overexposed
Chart (2014)	Position
South Korean International Albums (Circle)	79

2015 year-end chart performance for Overexposed
Chart (2015)	Position
South Korean International Albums (Circle)	90

=== Decade-end charts ===
Decade-end chart performance for Overepoxed
Chart (2010–2019)	Position
US Billboard 200	64

== Certifications and sales ==
Certifications and sales for Overexposed
Region	Certification	Certified units/sales
Australia (ARIA)	Platinum	70,000^{^}
Brazil (Pro-Música Brasil)	Diamond	160,000^{‡}
Denmark (IFPI Danmark)	2× Platinum	40,000^{‡}
France (SNEP)	Platinum	100,000^{*}
Germany (BVMI)	Gold	100,000^{‡}
Italy (FIMI)	Platinum	50,000^{‡}
Japan (RIAJ)	Gold	100,000^{^}
Mexico (AMPROFON)	2× Platinum+Gold	150,000^{^}
New Zealand (RMNZ)	2× Platinum	30,000^{‡}
Philippines (PARI)	Gold	7,500^{^}
Singapore (RIAS)	2× Platinum	20,000^{*}
South Korea (Gaon)		16,766
Sweden (GLF)	Gold	20,000^{‡}
United Kingdom (BPI)	Platinum	531,735
United States (RIAA)	Platinum	1,690,000
Summaries
Worldwide (IFPI)	—	2,200,000
^{*} Sales figures based on certification alone.^{^} Shipments figures based on certification alone.^{‡} Sales+streaming figures based on certification alone.

== Release history ==
Release history and formats for Overexposed
Country	Date	Edition(s)	Label
Japan	June 20, 2012	Standard (CD); limited (CD+DVD)	Universal
Portugal	June 21, 2012	Standard; deluxe (CD)	Universal
Australia	June 22, 2012	Standard (CD)	Universal
Germany	June 22, 2012	Standard; deluxe (CD)	Universal
France	June 25, 2012	Standard (CD)	Universal
South Korea	June 25, 2012	Standard (CD); deluxe (CD); 2nd deluxe (CD)	Universal
New Zealand	June 25, 2012	Standard; deluxe (CD)	Universal
United Kingdom	June 25, 2012	Standard; deluxe (CD)	Polydor
Canada	June 26, 2012	Standard; deluxe (CD)	Universal
Italy	June 26, 2012	Standard; deluxe (CD)	Universal
United States	June 26, 2012	Standard; deluxe (CD)	A&M/Octone
Spain	June 26, 2012	Standard; deluxe (CD)	Universal
Sweden	June 27, 2012	Standard	Universal
China	September 1, 2012	Standard	Universal
