= Love Somebody (Maroon 5 song) =

2013 single by Maroon 5

Single by Maroon 5

from the album Overexposed
- Released: May 14, 2013
- Recorded: 2012
- Genre: Dance-pop; electropop
- Length: 3:49
- Label: A&M Octone
- Songwriters: Adam Levine; Ryan Tedder; Noel Zancanella; Nathaniel Motte
- Producers: Ryan Tedder; Noel Zancanella

Maroon 5 singles chronology
"Daylight" (2012)	"Love Somebody" (2013)	"Maps" (2014)

Music video
- "Love Somebody" on YouTube

"Love Somebody" is a song by American pop rock band Maroon 5. It was sent to US contemporary hit radio on May 14, 2013, by A&M Octone Records, as the fourth and final single from their fourth studio album Overexposed (2012). The song was written by Adam Levine, Nathaniel Motte, Ryan Tedder and Noel Zancanella; the latter two are also the producers. "Love Somebody" is a dance-pop song that lyrically equates love and physical intimacy and explores "salvation on the dance floor".

Upon release, the song was a respectable success on the charts and became the fourth top ten hit from the album on the Billboard Hot 100. Despite its success, the single received mixed reviews from music critics who praised its composition, linking it to the works by Coldplay, but criticized its production and Levine's vocals. Following the release of the album, due to strong digital downloads, the song peaked at number eight on the singles chart in South Korea.

== Background and production ==
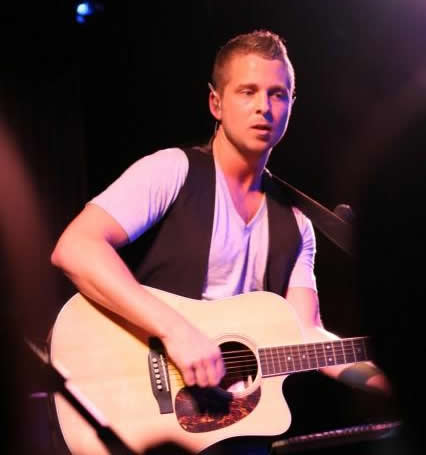
OneRepublic's Ryan Tedder served as a co-writer of "Love Somebody".

In mid-2011, Maroon 5 started working on their fourth studio album. One of the members of the band, James Valentine spoke to Billboard and revealed their plans to release their fourth studio album in early 2012. On March 26, 2012, the band posted a video on YouTube featuring numerous scenes from the band in the studio, recording the album. On June 26, 2012, the album was released under the title Overexposed.

The band's lead singer Adam Levine co-wrote "Love Somebody" with 3OH!3 singer Nathaniel Motte, Noel Zancanella and OneRepublic's Ryan Tedder. The latter two also produced it and provided programming and keys. Tedder and Zancanella also co-wrote and co-produced another song for Overexposed titled "Lucky Strike". "Love Somebody" was engineered by Smith Carlson at the Patriot Studios in Denver and Noah "Mailbox" Passovoy at the Conway Studios in Los Angeles; Eric Eylands served as the engineering assistant. Serban Ghenea mixed the song at the Mixstar Studios in Virginia Beach. John Hanes served as engineer for mix, while Phil Seaford as mixing assistant.

== Composition ==
"Love Somebody" is a dance-pop song with a length of three minutes and forty-nine seconds. It is set in the key of D♭ major and its instrumentation consists of piano and guitar. Rob Sheffield of Rolling Stone described the song's synth hook as the Sly Stone-meets-Eurythmics. According to Chris Payne of Billboard, Tedder and Zancanella's influence is all over the song and inches through the verses "before bubbling over just before the chorus kicks in." Adam Markovitz of Entertainment Weekly in a review of the album, wrote that the song together with "Daylight" have "thickly" produced choruses. Lyrically, "Love Somebody" equates love and physical intimacy, with Levine singing: "I really wanna love somebody [...] I really wanna touch somebody". Nate Chinen of The New York Times described the lyrical theme of the song as "a plea for salvation on the dance floor or some other horizontal surface".

== Critical reception ==
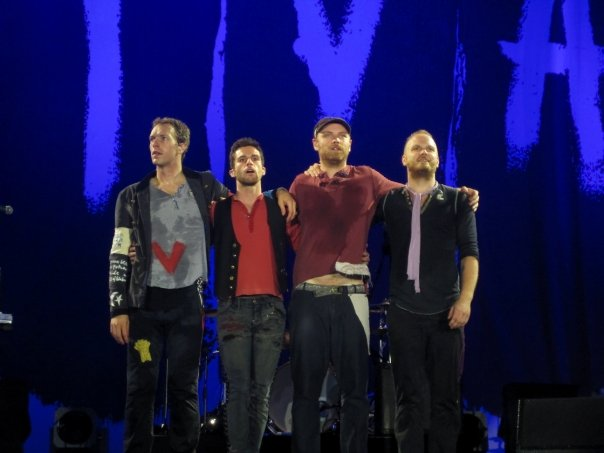
Critics linked "Love Somebody" to the works by British alternative rock band Coldplay.

Suzanne Byrne of RTÉ.ie wrote that "Love Somebody" alongside "Daylight", "The Man Who Never Lied" and "Lucky Strike" are potential single releases. Brittany Frederick of StarPulse called the song "earnest", while Cameron Adams of Herald Sun described it as Coldplay "trying to be" Katy Perry. Similarly as Adams, PopMatters' Evan Sawdey wrote that "Love Somebody" is the group's "sky-scraping Coldplay moment". Jeremy Thomas of 411 Mania labeled the song as one of the more emotional tracks on Overexposed and a "rare moment where the overhanging production tricks ease up just enough to make for an honest-to-God song with emotion and not just a laser scope aimed at the Billboard charts.

In a review of the album, Fraser McAlpine of BBC Music wrote that the band had left "the strutting cockerel heat" of their 2004 single "This Love" for the "saturated rave bliss" of "Love Somebody" or "The Man Who Never Lied". According to him that's an effect of the market they have chosen to contribute on. Billboard's Chris Payne thought that the song fades into the background of the other stronger tracks on Overexposed. Adam Markovitz of Entertainment Weekly was more critical towards Levine's vocals on "Love Somebody" and wrote that the singer's voice is processed in a high disaffected whine — "like a male Rihanna or an android castrato", which according to him, it's ideal for tracing the contours of a pop hook.

== Chart performance ==
Upon the release of Overexposed, due to strong digital downloads, "Love Somebody" debuted on the South Korea Gaon International Chart at number eight on June 24, 2012, with sales of 35,892 digital copies. The next week, it fell to number 15 and sold an additional 16,752 copies. It stayed on the chart's top 100 for total of eight weeks. The song debuted at number 54 on the Billboard Hot 100, and peaked at number 10, making Overexposed Maroon 5's first studio album to produce four Top 10 singles. As of June 2014, the song has sold 1,694,000 copies in the US.

== Music video ==
Levine and Ratajkowski in the music video

The music video for "Love Somebody", was shot in January 2013. It premiered on NBC on May 20, 2013, during the television series The Voice and released on Vevo, the following day. Directed by Rich Lee, the video features Levine and Emily Ratajkowski as his love interest, with the Maroon 5 members are all covered in grey paint. Levine initially paints himself out of a purely white background and then paints Ratajowski in front of him. The last scenes feature the band member's instruments spraying paint when played continually, a girl dancing seductively, and Levine and his love interest passionately embracing - all while covered in grey paint. In the very last scene, Levine reverses what he has done, removing all the paint from the scene, leaving no trace of them behind.

According to keyboardist PJ Morton, it involves all the members of the band including Ratajkowski, being completely covered in blue paint, he explained: "We were all painted up. But I guess what's going to happen in the video is you're just going to be able to see the paint, and not us, playing and performing."

== Live performances ==
The band performed the song during their appearances on the fourth season of The Voice (May 20) and The Today Show (June 14, 2013), respectively. On September 21, 2013, Maroon 5 also performed the song at 2013 iHeartRadio Music Festival in Las Vegas, Nevada.

== Credits and personnel ==
Engineering and mixing

- Engineered at Patriot Studios, Denver, Colorado; Conway Studios, Los Angeles, California; mixed at Mixstar Studios, Virginia Beach.

Personnel

- Songwriting – Adam Levine, Ryan Tedder, Noel Zancanella, Nathaniel Motte
- Production – Ryan Tedder, Noel Zancanella, Nathaniel Motte
- Engineering – Smith Carlson and Noah "Mailbox" Passovoy
- Assistant engineering – Eric Eylands
- Mixing – Serban Ghenea
- Mixing engineer – John Hanes
- Mixing assistant – Phil Seaford
- Programming and keys – Ryan Tedder, Noel Zancanella

Credits adapted from the liner notes of Overexposed, A&M/Octone Records.

== Charts and certifications ==
=== Weekly charts ===
Weekly chart performance for "Love Somebody"
Chart (2012–2013)	Peak position
Belgium (Ultratip Bubbling Under Flanders)	13
Belgium (Ultratip Bubbling Under Wallonia)	2
Canada Hot 100 (Billboard)	10
Canada AC (Billboard)	2
Canada CHR/Top 40 (Billboard)	11
Canada Hot AC (Billboard)	2
France (SNEP)	87
Iceland (Tonlist)	9
Ireland (IRMA)	56
Lebanon (The Official Lebanese Top 20)	15
Mexico Anglo (Monitor Latino)	15
Netherlands (Dutch Tipparade 40)	8
New Zealand (Recorded Music NZ)	34
Slovakia Airplay (ČNS IFPI)	41
South Korea (Gaon)	8
South Africa Airplay (EMA)	8
US Billboard Hot 100	10
US Adult Contemporary (Billboard)	2
US Adult Pop Airplay (Billboard)	1
US Dance Airplay (Billboard)	18
US Pop Airplay (Billboard)	2
Venezuela Pop Rock General (Record Report)	4

=== Year-end charts ===
2013 year-end chart performance for "Love Somebody"
Chart (2013)	Position
Canada (Canadian Hot 100)	35
US Billboard Hot 100	51
US Adult Contemporary (Billboard)	14
US Adult Top 40 (Billboard)	5
US Mainstream Top 40 (Billboard)	19

2014 year-end chart performance for "Love Somebody"
Chart (2014)	Position
US Adult Contemporary (Billboard)	17

=== Certifications ===
Sales certifications for "Love Somebody"
Region	Certification	Certified units/sales
Australia (ARIA)	Gold	35,000^{‡}
Brazil (Pro-Música Brasil)	Platinum	60,000^{‡}
Canada (Music Canada)	2× Platinum	160,000^{*}
Mexico (AMPROFON)	Gold	30,000^{*}
New Zealand (RMNZ)	Platinum	30,000^{‡}
United States (RIAA)	2× Platinum	1,694,000
^{*} Sales figures based on certification alone.^{‡} Sales+streaming figures based on certification alone.

== Release history ==
Region	Date	Format	Version	Label(s)	Ref.
United States	May 14, 2013	Mainstream radio	Original	A&M Octone	
Various	June 28, 2013	Digital download	Panic City Remix	Interscope	
France	September 9, 2013	Digital download	Original	Universal	
