= Payphone (song) =

2012 single by Maroon 5 featuring Wiz Khalifa

Single by Maroon 5 featuring Wiz Khalifa

from the album Overexposed
- Released: April 16, 2012
- Recorded: 2011
- Studio: Conway (Los Angeles)
- Genre: Pop; R&B; pop rock
- Length: 3:51 (album version); 3:47 (no rap edit)
- Label: A&M Octone
- Composers: Benjamin Levin; Ammar Malik; Dan Omelio; Shellback
- Lyricists: Adam Levine; Ammar Malik; Benjamin Levin; Cameron Thomaz
- Producers: Benjamin Levin; Shellback; Robopop (add.)

Maroon 5 singles chronology
"Moves like Jagger" (2011)	"Payphone" (2012)	"One More Night" (2012)

Wiz Khalifa singles chronology
"Till I Die" (2012)	"Payphone" (2012)	"Work Hard, Play Hard" (2012)

Music video
- "Payphone" on YouTube

"Payphone" is a song by American pop rock band Maroon 5 featuring American rapper Wiz Khalifa. It was released on April 16, 2012 by A&M Octone Records, as the lead single from the band's fourth studio album Overexposed (2012). The song was written by Adam Levine, Khalifa, Ammar Malik, producers Benny Blanco and Shellback, and additional producer Robopop. The song is a pop ballad that describes a romance that ended abruptly. It received favourable reviews from music critics, who praised the catchy melody and named it "a radio success", but some others dismissed its title and Khalifa's appearance.

In the official music video directed by Samuel Bayer, Levine takes down bank robbers and attempts to become the hero in a hail of bullets as he makes his escape. He steals a gun from a robber and then gets mistaken for one. Because of this, he must escape in a car chase from a fleet of policemen, which he does with ease. The video was positively received from critics, who considered it an enjoyable mini-action film. It was featured on One Night Only and Shameless.

On the Billboard Hot 100, the song debuted at the number three spot before peaking at number two. The song sold 493,000 copies in its first week, becoming the best sales week for a digital song by a group and also the eleventh-best sales week overall. It peaked at number one in Canada for eight consecutive weeks. It also topped the charts in the United Kingdom, making it the band's first-ever single to do so. "Payphone" was the world's fifth best-selling single of 2012 with 9.5 million copies sold.

== Background ==
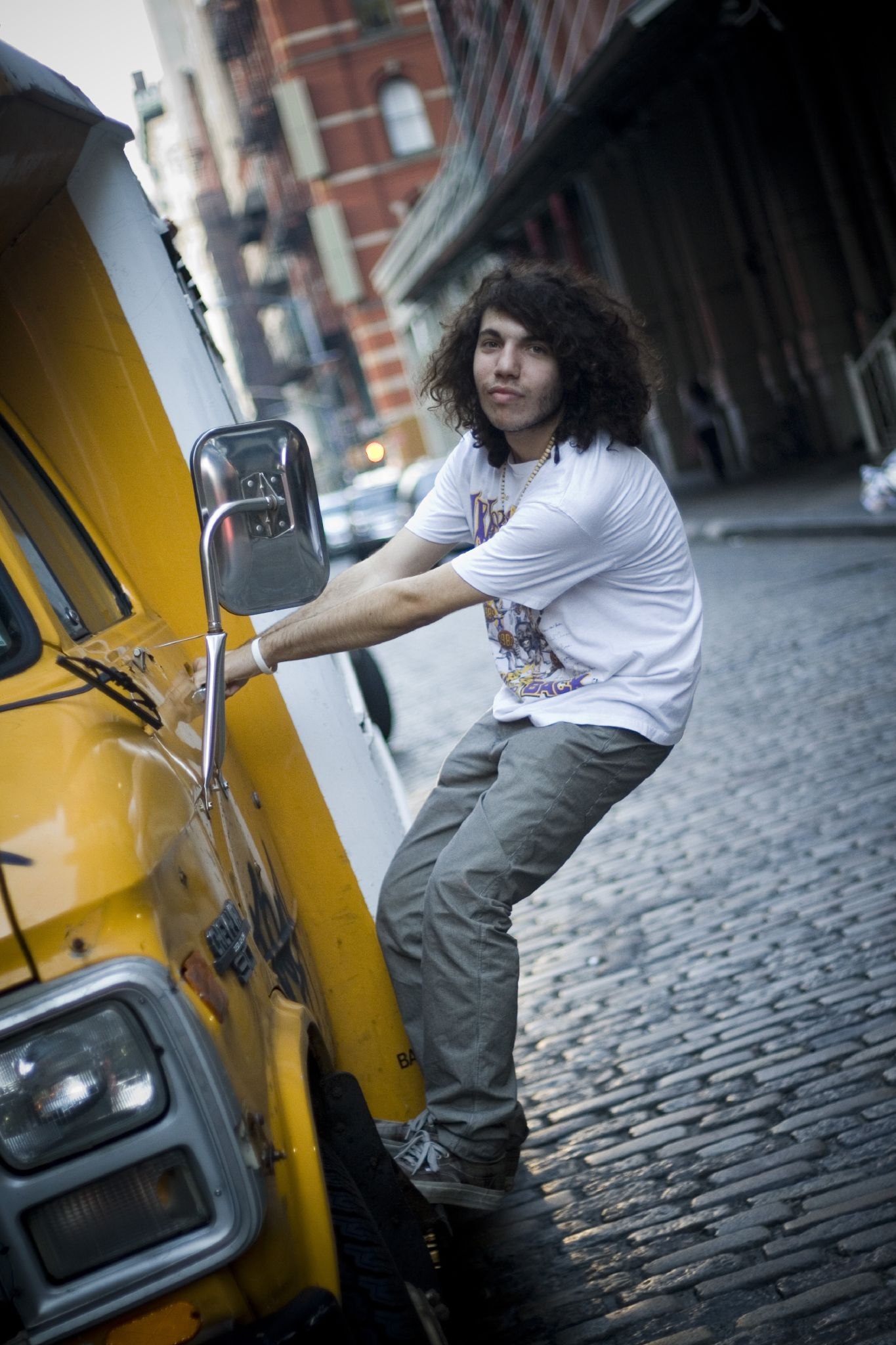
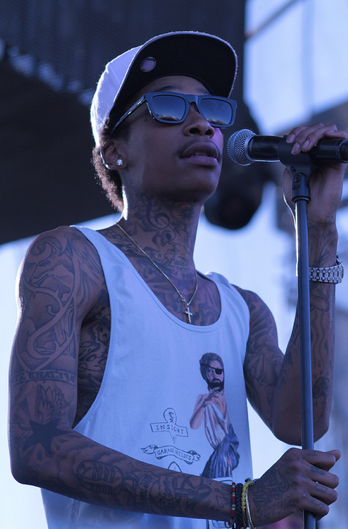
Co-writer and co-producer Benny Blanco (pictured in 2008) called on American rapper Wiz Khalifa (pictured in 2011) to write and perform a rap verse on "Payphone".

The song was written by Maroon 5's lead singer Adam Levine, along with Ammar Malik, Robopop, Benny Blanco, Shellback, and Wiz Khalifa, while production, programming, additional bass, keys, acoustic guitars and background vocals were provided by Shellback and Blanco. Levine, Blanco, Shellback, and Malik also wrote the band's previous single, "Moves Like Jagger". The writing process started when Malik and Robopop constructed a piano line and demo track that Blanco compiled into a proper melody. They gave it to Levine, who wrote the lyrics. Blanco also wanted to throw a wrench into the Maroon 5 works by adding hip-hop flavor to its sound, "I love when things don't make sense, like, 'Holy fuck!' You don't hear him on the song at all. I like when bands dip into a whole different genre." For this, he commissioned Wiz Khalifa (whose singles "No Sleep" and the then-upcoming "Work Hard, Play Hard", Blanco produced or was producing) to write and rap a verse on "Payphone". In an interview with Rolling Stone, Blanco told that five minutes before Khalifa arrived at the studio, he prepared "the sound beds for the finger snap-driven portion of the jam". However, producer Max Martin, who was the executive producer of Overexposed, adjusted the chorus, because he felt it should be a "little different".

Shellback recorded "Payphone" at Conway Studios in Los Angeles alongside Noah "Mailbox" Pasovoy, while Eric Eylands served as the assistant engineer. John Hanes mixed the song at Mixstar Studios in Virginia Beach and Phil Seaford was the mixing assistant. Jeremy "Jbogs" Levin and David "D Silb" Silberstein served as production coordinators. Khalifa appears as courtesy of Rostrum Records. "Payphone" was released as a lead single from Overexposed on April 16, 2012, in the United States. On April 17, it was digitally released in most territories. A&M Octone Records serviced the song to contemporary hit radio in the US on April 24. A remix version of "Payphone" by The Sound of Arrows premiered exclusively on PopCrush website on May 22. A CD single containing the album version of the song together with a Thomas Penton/Barry Huffine remix was released on June 8 in Germany.

== Composition and lyrics ==
"Payphone" is a pop/R&B song that contains a hip hop beat and piano hook. It has a duration of 3 minutes and 51 seconds. Its instrumentation consists of funk guitars, bass and synths. "Payphone" is written in the key of B♭ major (recorded in B major), in common time, with a tempo of 110 beats per minute. Levine's vocal range spans from the low note of G♯_{3} to the high note of B_{4}. Thomas Chau from AOL Radio Blog called the song "mellow" and compared it to the band's previous singles "She Will Be Loved" (2004) and "Won't Go Home Without You" (2007).

On the chorus, he sings: "I’m at a payphone trying to call home / All of my change I spent on you / Where have the times gone? / Baby, it’s all wrong / Where are the plans we made for two?". Because of the song's profanity, "Shit" and "fucking" are intact, but have been replaced with "it" and "stupid" in the song's clean version. The clean version censors Wiz Khalifa's cursing as well. When Khalifa serves his verse, his rhymes don't speak of his love life, but rather his "haters": "I'll be out spending all this money while you sittin' 'round wondering why it wasn't you who came up from nothin' / Made it from the bottom now when you see me I'm stunnin'." An alternate version has these lyrics replaced with "Now baby don't hang up, so I can tell you what you need to know / Baby I'm begging you just please don't go, so I can tell you what you need to know."

== Critical reception ==
"Payphone" received positive reviews from music critics. Crystal Bell from Huffington Post called it "definitely one of the band's most pop-y singles to date". Robbie Daw from Idolator wrote that the song is "extremely Top 40-friendly". Melinda Newman from HitFix wrote that the song "is a straight-ahead pop ditty, that, like everything else these days, seems to take a page from Bruno Mars' "Grenade" for its shiny, military-like precise beat that still manages to sound convincingly warm. It's melodic and catchy, and but not overly aggressive. Rick Florino of Artist Direct commented that the song "merges one of the band's biggest hooks with clever lines". Robert Copsey from Digital Spy described it as "a shining example as an addictive head-nodder".

Chris Payne from Billboard wrote that "The pop/R&B fling is far from a classic Maroon 5 cut, yet it serves as a testament to the band's continued rebranding and a reminder of how much the airwaves have changed since 'This Love' hit in 2004." Another mixed review came from Entertainment Weekly's Marc Snetiker, who commented that "it’s pretty easy to replace the band’s signature electronic meta-funk with any of the boy band’s impish members, for example One Direction." However, he concluded that "it's catchy, infectious, and overwhelmingly mellow." Fraser McAlpine from BBC Music criticized his voice, writing: "Adam Levine fires up that nasal yelp as soon as the song begins, and does not let up until the fadeout." McAlpine also wrote that "Wiz Khalifa gets more space at the front of the stage than the rest of his band do."

"Payphone is an alchemy of elemental pop-rock building blocks that conjures virile longing in the same corny-graceful way as past M5 hits like "She Will Be Loved". Levine's voice soars, the piano and guitar hit notes of bitter nostalgia, and for once the words' hurt feels real. And whether by Pro-Tooled magic or old-fashioned sweat, the song also sounds remarkably like it was recorded in a studio by musicians who actually came together to play as a band — even if one of them was only dropping by on his way to the soundstage."

== Chart performance ==
In the United States, the song debuted on the Pop Songs chart at number 21, making it the highest-charting debut by a group since 'N Sync's "Pop" debuted at the same position in June 2001. "Payphone" peaked at number one on the Billboard's Pop Songs chart, becoming their fourth number one. On Pop Songs, the group made it to back-to-back toppers, as its last entry, "Moves Like Jagger," featuring Christina Aguilera, reigned for six weeks beginning in October 2011. The band had likewise led consecutively with its first two number ones, "This Love" (three weeks) and "She Will Be Loved" (four) in 2004. Wiz Khalifa, featured on the pop edit of "Payphone," scores his first Mainstream Top 40 number one. On the Adult Pop Songs chart, "Payphone" debuted at number 17, the highest-ever debut by a group and the third-highest overall. It also topped the Adult Pop Songs, becoming their fifth leader. On Adult Pop Songs, Maroon 5 - whose number one ledger on the list includes its four Pop Songs leaders plus 2010's "Misery" - ties Nickelback for the most commanding titles among groups in the chart's 16-year history.

"Payphone" sold 493,000 digital downloads in its first week and subsequently debuted at number one on the Hot Digital Songs chart, the best sales week ever for a digital song by a group, surpassing Black Eyed Peas' "Boom Boom Pow", which topped the chart with sales of 464,000 units in April 2009. It is also the eighth-best sales week overall since Nielsen SoundScan began tracking digital downloads in 2003. The song debuted at number three on the Billboard Hot 100 on the issue dated May 5, 2012. It failed to reach number one however, peaking at number two on the chart dated May 26, 2012. It would stay there for six non-consecutive weeks, being blocked from the top spot by Gotye's "Somebody That I Used to Know" and Carly Rae Jepsen's smash hit of the summer, "Call Me Maybe". On its 18th week in the top ten (September 1, 2012), "Payphone" dropped to number seven on the Billboard Hot 100, making it the first time the song was not a part of the top five. It also spent its first 19 weeks in the top ten. Over 5 million copies of the song had been sold in the United States by March 2013, and as of June 2014, it has sold 5,510,000 copies in the US.

On the Canadian Hot 100 chart, the song debuted at number 2, for the issue dated May 5, 2012. The following week, the song fell to number 3, where it remained for a further week. The following week, the song climbed to number 2 and on the chart issue dated June 2, 2012, the song topped the Canadian charts. For the following seven weeks, the song remained at the top, spending a total of eight weeks at the top.

In the United Kingdom, "Payphone" debuted at number one on the UK Singles Chart. It remained at the top of the chart for two non-consecutive weeks and became both Maroon 5's and Wiz Khalifa's first chart-topping song in Britain. It sold over 141,000 copies, which marks the third week in a row that the number one single broke the 100,000 barrier after Gary Barlow and Cheryl Cole. According to the Official Charts Company, the song sold 725,000 copies in the United Kingdom in 2012, becoming Britain's ninth best-selling single of that year. "Payphone" had sold 68,000 digital copies in Italy.

== Music video ==
The music video for "Payphone" directed by Samuel Bayer, was shot on April 17 and 18, 2012. Maroon 5 frontman Adam Levine was spotted shooting the video, making a call from a Los Angeles phone booth, fleeing from the police with model Bregje Heinen and speeding away in a classic sports car. It is revealed in the video for Levine's role is a bank worker, he said: "I work at a bank; I have no self-confidence. It's gonna be a very difficult role for me to play because I'm a cocky motherf**ker." The video for "Payphone" premiered on May 9, 2012, on E! and was released on Vevo on May 10. It was reportedly similar to The Matrix, The Dark Knight and Die Hard, and the high-action FPS video game, Payday: The Heist. The car used in the video, a custom 1967 Shelby Cobra, was a kit-car hand built by car enthusiast Jim Fletcher from Fresno, CA.

In September 2026, "Payphone" became the band's sixth video to reach one billion views on YouTube.

=== Synopsis ===
A still from the video. Levine is at a payphone, in a phone booth, trying to call home.

The video begins with a flash forward that starts with a beleaguered Levine torching his ride and dialing a telephone number at a payphone. Another typical day at a Las Vegas (seen from the decals on the police cars) bank for Levine is shown next, which turns into chaos when some bandits enter and take charge (some of the bank robbers are played by the other members of the band: guitarist James Valentine, drummer Matt Flynn, bassist Mickey Madden and keyboardist, previously a touring Maroon 5 member, PJ Morton) – all of this happens while the song plays in the background. Levine grabs a gun from one of the robbers and threatens to get rid of them. He and his female co-worker named Sonya (Bregje Heinen) escape, though Levine is shot in the arm, but when some cops mistake him for one of the robbers as they begin to chase. Levine tells Sonya to hide in a car and steals an AC Cobra 427 that belongs to Wiz Khalifa to get away from them. A car chase follows, and when Levine is almost caught by the police, he steers the stolen convertible onto the wrong side of the road and causes a huge explosion, which destroys one of the police cars. When he finally reaches his destination in Los Angeles, he passes by a place where Khalifa, the owner of the car, performed his rap earlier. After Levine gets out of the convertible, it also explodes and he enters a booth, injured, with the titular payphone, probably to call for help (it is also likely that he is calling Sonya) – this connects to the beginning of the video.

=== Reception ===
Natalie Finn of E! News gave a positive review for the video, writing that "Adam Levine looks just as good as a buttoned-up bank employee as he does as a dirty, wounded fugitive trying to outrun the cops". Becky Bain of Idolator wrote that "The clip is an enjoyable mini-blockbuster, but it’s still missing one important ingredient: Adam Levine without a shirt." Rebecca Ford of The Hollywood Reporter gave a mixed review, writing: "Although it's fun to see such a big-budget clip from the band, the story line doesn't make complete sense. Since Levine's character didn't rob the bank, why does he keep running from the cops? And why does he leave the pretty lady behind?". Kyle Anderson of Entertainment Weekly, wrote that "There's a little bit of John McClane in Levine's performance–could he have a future as an action star".

The video was nominated for an MTV Video Music Award for Best Pop Video.

=== Lyric video ===
A lyric video for the song premiered on April 16, 2012, on Maroon 5's Vevo channel. The clip is in an animated graphic novel style, drawn in panels. The clip shows the main character, presumably frontman Levine, looking back on his relationship and heroically fighting monsters, rescuing old women from muggers, etc. Towards the end, Wiz Khalifa appears in a hoodie, acting as Levine's crime-fighting sidekick.

== Live performances ==
On April 16, 2012, Maroon 5 and Wiz Khalifa performed "Payphone" for the first time on The Voice, a reality talent show, in which lead singer Adam Levine is one of the coaches. "Payphone" was also performed, for the first time at a proper Maroon 5 concert, during the band's special performance for the grand opening of the Microsoft Store in Palo Alto, California, on April 21, 2012. Adam Levine sang the lines from the alternative version of the song, without the rap, released officially on April 18, 2012, just two days after its world premiere on The Voice and also on iTunes: "Now, baby, don't hang up / So I can tell you what you need to know / Baby, I'm begging you / Just, please, don't go / So I can tell you what you need to know." in lieu of Khalifa's rap verse. On May 12, 2012, Maroon 5 and Khalifa performed "Payphone" together at the 2012 edition of Wango Tango. In June 2012, the band performed "Payphone" (with a medley of their song "Moves Like Jagger"), on The Voice UK and Germany's Next Top Model. On June 5, 2012, Maroon 5 performed "Payphone" on the French reality talk show, Le Grand Journal in Paris, France. The band performed the song live on Late Night with Jimmy Fallon (June 28), and The Today Show (June 29), where they also played their songs including "One More Night", "Moves Like Jagger" and "Harder to Breathe". The band continued to played "Payphone" in various concert tours such as the Overexposed Tour and the 2013 Honda Civic Tour, respectively.

In July 2026, Maroon 5 performed the song and serving as headliner for the 2026 BST Hyde Park concert at Hyde Park, London.

== Awards and nominations ==
Year	Ceremony	Category	Result	Ref.
2012	Cyworld Digital Music Awards	International Artist of the Month – April	Won	
2012	Melon Music Awards	Best Pop Award	Won	
2012	MTV Video Music Awards	Best Pop Video	Nominated	
2012	Premios 40 Principales	Best International Song	Nominated	
2012	Teen Choice Awards	Choice Break-Up Song	Won	
2013	ASCAP Pop Music Awards	Most Performed Song	Won	
2013	Billboard Music Awards	Top 100 Song	Nominated	
2013	Billboard Music Awards	Top Radio Song	Nominated	
2013	Billboard Music Awards	Top Pop Song	Nominated	
2013	Billboard Music Awards	Top Digital Song	Nominated	
2013	BMI Pop Awards	Award Winning Song	Won	
2013	BMI Pop Awards	Publisher of the Year (UMPG)	Won	
2013	BMI Pop Awards	Songwriter of the Year	Won	
2013	Circle Chart Music Awards	International Song of the Year	Won	
2013	Grammy Awards	Best Pop Duo/Group Performance	Nominated	
2013	Hito Music Awards	Best Western Song	Won	
2013	MTV Video Music Awards Japan	Best Collaboration	Nominated	
2013	MTV Video Music Awards Japan	Best Group Video	Nominated	
2013	MTV Video Play Awards	Most-Played Music Video of the Year	Double Platinum	
2013	MuchMusic Video Awards	International Video of the Year – Group	Nominated	
2013	Myx Music Awards	Favorite International Video	Nominated	
2013	People's Choice Awards	Favorite Music Video	Nominated	
2013	Radio Disney Music Awards	Best Breakup Song	Nominated	
2013	RTHK International Pop Poll Awards	Top 10 International Gold Song	Won	

== Track listings ==
CD single
No.	Title	Length
1.	"Payphone" (featuring Wiz Khalifa) (Explicit version)	3:51
2.	"Payphone" (featuring Wiz Khalifa) (Thomas Penton/Barry Huffine Remix)	4:05

Digital download
No.	Title	Length
1.	"Payphone (Explicit Version)" (featuring Wiz Khalifa)	3:51
2.	"Payphone (Clean Version)" (featuring Wiz Khalifa)	3:51

UK and Ireland digital EP
No.	Title	Length
1.	"Payphone" (featuring Wiz Khalifa)	3:51
2.	"Payphone" (No Rap Edit)	3:42
3.	"Payphone" (featuring Wiz Khalifa) (Thomas Penton/Barry Huffine Remix)	4:05
4.	"Payphone" (featuring Wiz Khalifa) (The Sound of Arrows Remix)	5:02

== Credits and personnel ==
Maroon 5

- Adam Levine – lead vocals, lyrics
- Mickey Madden - bass guitar
- James Valentine - lead and rhythm guitar, programming
- PJ Morton - keyboards, synthesizers, backing vocals
- Matt Flynn – drums

Session musicians/songwriters

- Wiz Khalifa – featured guest artist, rap verse, lyrics
- Dan Omelio (Robopop) – composition, arrangement, additional production, additional keyboards, synthesizers and guitars
- Shellback – producer, composition, arrangement, recording, programming, additional bass, keyboards, synthesizers, acoustic guitar, backing vocals
- Benjamin Levin (Benny Blanco) – producer, lyrics, composition, engineer, programming, additional keyboards and synths
- Ammar Malik – composition

Production

- Bradford Smith – engineer
- Chris Sclafani – engineer
- Jonathan Mann – engineer
- Noah "Mailbox" Passovoy – recording
- Eric Eylands – assistant engineer
- John Hanes – mix engineer
- Phil Seaford – assistant mix engineer
- Andrew "Muffman" Luftman – assistant engineer
- Scott "Yarmov" Yarmovsky – assistant engineer
- Sam "Såklart" Holland – assistant engineer
- Jeremy "Jboogs" Levin – production coordination
- David "D Silb" Silberstein – production coordination

Recording

- Engineered at Record Plant Studios, Los Angeles, California, at Downtown Studios, New York City, New York, and at Jon Mann Studios, Reston, Virginia
- Recorded at Conway Studios, Los Angeles, California
- Mixed at MixStar Studios, Virginia Beach, Virginia

== Charts ==
=== Weekly charts ===
Initial chart performance for "Payphone"
Chart (2012–2013)	Peak position
Australia (ARIA)	2
Austria (Ö3 Austria Top 40)	5
Belgium (Ultratop 50 Flanders)	8
Belgium (Ultratop 50 Wallonia)	8
Bulgaria Airplay (BAMP)	5
Canada Hot 100 (Billboard)	1
Canada AC (Billboard)	1
Canada CHR/Top 40 (Billboard)	1
Canada Hot AC (Billboard)	1
Czech Republic Airplay (ČNS IFPI)	6
Denmark (Tracklisten)	7
Euro Digital Song Sales (Billboard)	1
Finland (Suomen virallinen lista)	6
France (SNEP)	8
Germany (GfK)	4
Honduras (Honduras Top 50)	10
Hungary (Rádiós Top 40)	1
Ireland (IRMA)	2
Israel International Airplay (Media Forest)	2
Italy (FIMI)	1
Italian Airplay (EarOne)	2
Japan Hot 100 (Billboard)	5
Japan Hot Overseas (Billboard Japan)	1
Mexico (Billboard Mexican Airplay)	13
Mexico Anglo (Monitor Latino)	5
Netherlands (Dutch Top 40)	8
Netherlands (Single Top 100)	14
New Zealand (Recorded Music NZ)	2
Norway (VG-lista)	8
Scottish Singles Sales (Official Charts)	1
Singapore (Billboard)	2
Slovakia Airplay (ČNS IFPI)	10
South Korea (Gaon)	5
Spain (Promusicae)	14
Sweden (Sverigetopplistan)	6
Switzerland (Schweizer Hitparade)	4
UK Singles (Official Charts)	1
US Billboard Hot 100	2
US Adult Contemporary (Billboard) Version without Wiz Khalifa	2
US Adult Pop Airplay (Billboard) Version without Wiz Khalifa	1
US Dance Club Songs (Billboard) Version without Wiz Khalifa	24
US Hot Latin Songs (Billboard)	43
US Pop Airplay (Billboard)	1
US Rhythmic Airplay (Billboard)	9
Venezuela Pop Rock General (Record Report)	1

2020s chart performance for "Payphone"
Chart (2021–2026)	Peak position
Global 200 (Billboard)	114
Philippines (Billboard)	7
Portugal (AFP)	127
Singapore (RIAS)	24

=== Year-end charts ===
2012 year-end chart performance for "Payphone"
Chart (2012)	Position
Australia (ARIA)	11
Austria (Ö3 Austria Top 40)	32
Belgium (Ultratop 50 Flanders)	33
Belgium (Ultratop 50 Wallonia)	30
Brazil (Crowley)	47
Canada (Canadian Hot 100)	4
Denmark (Tracklisten)	21
France (SNEP)	43
Germany (Media Control Charts)	30
Hungary (Rádiós Top 40)	9
Ireland (IRMA)	11
Italy (FIMI)	12
Japan (Japan Hot 100)	20
Netherlands (Dutch Top 40)	40
Netherlands (Single Top 100)	52
New Zealand (Recorded Music NZ)	7
South Korea (Gaon)	48
Spain (PROMUSICAE)	36
Sweden (Sverigetopplistan)	25
Switzerland (Schweizer Hitparade)	24
UK Singles (OCC)	9
Ukraine Airplay (TopHit)	88
US Billboard Hot 100	4
US Adult Contemporary (Billboard)	11
US Adult Top 40 (Billboard)	6
US Mainstream Top 40 (Billboard)	5
US Rhythmic (Billboard)	45
Venezuela Pop Rock General (Record Report)	1

2013 year-end chart performance for "Payphone"
Chart (2013)	Position
US Adult Contemporary (Billboard)	34

2022 year-end chart performance for "Payphone"
Chart (2022)	Position
Global Excl. US (Billboard)	193

=== Decade-end charts ===
2010s-end chart performance for "Payphone"
Chart (2010–2019)	Position
US Billboard Hot 100	77

== Certifications and sales ==
Certifications and sales for "Payphone"
Region	Certification	Certified units/sales
Australia (ARIA)	13× Platinum	910,000^{‡}
Austria (IFPI Austria)	Gold	15,000^{*}
Brazil (Pro-Música Brasil)	3× Diamond	750,000^{‡}
Canada (Music Canada)	5× Platinum	400,000^{*}
Denmark (IFPI Danmark)	Platinum	30,000^{^}
Germany (BVMI)	3× Gold	900,000^{‡}
Italy (FIMI)	3× Platinum	300,000^{‡}
Japan (RIAJ) Digital single	Platinum	250,000^{*}
Mexico (AMPROFON)	2× Platinum+Gold	150,000^{*}
New Zealand (RMNZ)	6× Platinum	180,000^{‡}
Portugal (AFP)	2× Platinum	40,000^{‡}
South Korea (Gaon)	—	3,298,214
Spain (Promusicae)	3× Platinum	180,000^{‡}
Switzerland (IFPI Switzerland)	Platinum	30,000^{^}
United Kingdom (BPI)	4× Platinum	2,400,000^{‡}
United States (RIAA)	7× Platinum	7,000,000
Streaming
Denmark (IFPI Danmark)	3× Platinum	5,400,000^{†}
Japan (RIAJ)	Platinum	100,000,000^{†}
^{*} Sales figures based on certification alone.^{^} Shipments figures based on certification alone.^{‡} Sales+streaming figures based on certification alone.^{†} Streaming-only figures based on certification alone.

== Radio and release history ==
Release dates for "Payphone"
Region	Date	Format	Label	Ref.
United States	April 16, 2012	Digital download	A&M Octone	
Argentina	April 17, 2012	Digital download	A&M Octone	
Australia	April 17, 2012	Digital download	A&M Octone	
Austria	April 17, 2012	Digital download	A&M Octone	
Brazil	April 17, 2012	Digital download	A&M Octone	
Canada	April 17, 2012	Digital download	A&M Octone	
Czech Republic	April 17, 2012	Digital download	A&M Octone	
France	April 17, 2012	Digital download	A&M Octone	
Germany	April 17, 2012	Digital download	A&M Octone	
Hungary	April 17, 2012	Digital download	A&M Octone	
Italy	April 17, 2012	Digital download	A&M Octone	
New Zealand	April 17, 2012	Digital download	A&M Octone	
Portugal	April 17, 2012	Digital download	A&M Octone	
Spain	April 17, 2012	Digital download	A&M Octone	
Switzerland	April 17, 2012	Digital download	A&M Octone	
United States	April 24, 2012	Contemporary hit radio	A&M Octone	
United States	May 22, 2012	Digital download	A&M Octone	
Germany	June 8, 2012	CD	Universal	
United Kingdom	June 17, 2012	Digital download	A&M Octone	

== Precision Tunes version ==
"Payphone"

Single by Precision Tunes
- Released: April 17, 2012
- Recorded: 2012
- Genre: Pop
- Length: 3:51
- Label: PT
- Songwriters: Adam Levine; Ammar Malik; Benjamin Levin; Cameron Thomaz; Dan Omelio; Johan Schuster

In April 2012, a cover of the song by Precision Tunes was released for digital download. Due to the Maroon 5 original not being available for purchase in the United Kingdom at the time, with the release date for their version set for June 2012, the Precision Tunes version of the song was met with a large influx of downloads there. Downloads of the cover caused this version of "Payphone" to debut at number 83 on the UK Singles Chart. The following week, it hit the top ten of the chart, peaking at number nine.

=== Track listing ===
Digital download
No.	Title	Length
1.	"Payphone" (Maroon 5 featuring Wiz Khalifa) (Precision Tunes version)	3:51

==== Charts ====
Chart (2012)	Peak position
UK Indie (Official Charts)	2
UK Singles (Official Charts)	9
Scottish Singles Sales (Official Charts)	4

=== Release history ===
Region	Date	Format	Label	Ref.
United Kingdom	April 17, 2012	Digital download	PT	

== See also ==
- List of highest-certified singles in Australia
