= Dear Girl Tour =

2014 concert tour by Pharrell Williams

- Tour by Pharrell Williams
- Promotional poster for the tour
- Associated album: G I R L
- Start date: September 7, 2014
- End date: October 16, 2014
- Legs: 1
- No. of shows: 26 in Europe

The Dear Girl Tour (stylized as the Dear G I R L Tour) was the debut concert tour by American musician Pharrell Williams. The tour supports his second studio album, G I R L, and consist of 26 dates in Europe. The trek started on September 7, 2014 at the ITU Stadium in Istanbul, Turkey. The support acts for the tour were Foxes and Cris Cab.

== Opening acts ==
- Cris Cab
- Foxes

== Set list ==
This set list is representative of the performance in Paris, France, on October 13, 2014. It does not represent all concerts for the duration of the tour.

1. "Come Get It Bae"
2. "Frontin'"
3. "Hunter"
4. "Marilyn Monroe"
5. "Brand New"
6. "Hot in Herre"
7. "I Just Wanna Love U (Give It 2 Me)"
8. "Pass the Courvoisier, Part II"
9. "Gush"
10. "Rock Star"
11. "Lapdance"
12. "She Wants to Move"
13. "Beautiful"
14. "Drop It Like It's Hot"
15. "Lost Queen"
16. "It Girl"
17. "Hollaback Girl"
18. "Blurred Lines"
19. "Get Lucky"

Encore

20. "Lose Yourself to Dance"
21. "Gust of Wind"
22. "Happy"

== Shows ==
List of 2014 concerts, showing date, city, country, and venue
Date (2014)	City	Country	Venue
Europe
September 7	Istanbul	Turkey	ITU Stadium
September 9	Manchester	England	Phones4u Arena
September 12	Copenhagen	Denmark	Forum Copenhagen
September 13	Stockholm	Sweden	Ericsson Globe
September 14	Oslo	Norway	Oslo Spektrum
September 16	Berlin	Germany	Max Schmeling Halle
September 17	Prague	Czech Republic	O_{2} Arena
September 18	Vienna	Austria	Marx Halle
September 20	Milan	Italy	Mediolanum Forum
September 21	Zürich	Switzerland	Hallenstadion
September 23	Amsterdam	Netherlands	Ziggo Dome
September 24	Antwerp	Belgium	Sportpaleis
September 26	Frankfurt	Germany	Festhalle Frankfurt
September 27	Düsseldorf	Germany	ISS Dome
September 28	Stuttgart	Germany	Hanns-Martin-Schleyer-Halle
October 1	Barcelona	Spain	Palau Sant Jordi
October 3	Lisbon	Portugal	MEO Arena
October 4	Madrid	Spain	Palacio de Deportes
October 6	Toulouse	France	Zénith de Toulouse
October 7	Nantes	France	Zénith de Nantes
October 9	London	England	The O_{2} Arena
October 10	London	England	The O_{2} Arena
October 13	Paris	France	Zénith Paris
October 14	Paris	France	Zénith Paris
October 15	Paris	France	Zénith Paris
October 16	Paris	France	Zénith Paris
