= List of awards and nominations received by Pharrell Williams =

Pharrell Williams awards and nominations
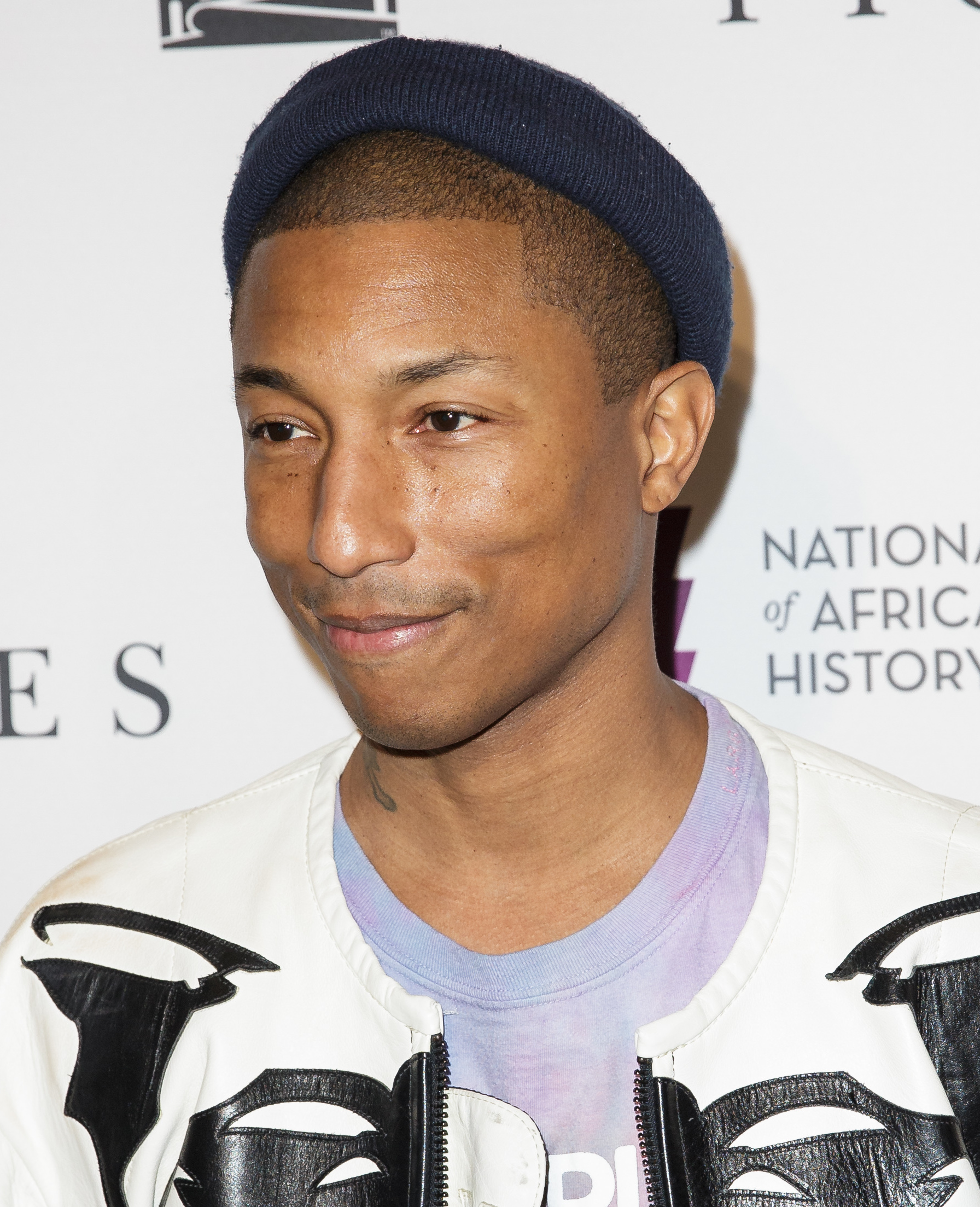
- Pharrell in 2015
Awards and nominations
Award	Wins	Nominations
Academy Awards	0	2
BET Awards	4	9
Billboard Music Awards	6	18
BRIT Awards	1	3
Daytime Emmy Awards	0	1
Golden Globe Awards	0	1
Grammy Awards	14	42
MTV Video Music Awards	1	18
Soul Train Music Awards	5	12

Totals (Note: Certain award groups do not simply award one winner. They acknowledge several different recipients, have runners-up, and have third place. Since this is a specific recognition and is different from losing an award, runner-up mentions are considered wins in this award tally. For simplification and to avoid errors, each award in this list has been presumed to have had a prior nomination.)
- Wins: 58
- Nominations: 200

Pharrell Williams is an American musician and producer. Since his debut as a music producer with The Neptunes, he has worked with many artists in the contemporary music industry, such as Ariana Grande, Beyoncé, Madonna, Jay-Z, Kanye West, Calvin Harris, Gwen Stefani, Alicia Keys, Rihanna, Justin Timberlake, Janelle Monáe, Mariah Carey, Solange Knowles, Snoop Dogg and Britney Spears. Williams has also collaborated in some of the best-selling singles worldwide, such as "Get Lucky", "I Just Wanna Love U (Give It 2 Me)" and "Blurred Lines". He started his solo career with two albums In My Mind (2006) and G.I.R.L. (2014). The latter album produced the lead single "Happy", which has sold almost 14 million copies worldwide.

Williams has received numerous accolades and nominations; he has won 14 Grammy Awards from 42 nominations, including three as Producer of the Year, Non-Classical (one came as a part of The Neptunes in 2004). He has also won four BET Awards, six Billboard Music Award, one MTV Video Music Award, one Brit Award and four NAACP Image Awards. In 2012 Williams was honored with the ASCAP Golden Note Award for his "extraordinary career milestones records achieved as a songwriter, composer and artist".

In 2014, Williams was nominated for an Academy Award for Best Original Song at the 86th Academy Awards for his song "Happy", part of Despicable Me 2's soundtrack. In 2017, he received a nomination for Best Picture for co-producing the film Hidden Figures. The film also gave Williams a nomination at the Golden Globe Awards for Best Original Score. Williams has received three nominations at the Satellite Awards and four at the Black Reel Awards.

== Academy Awards ==
Year	Category	Nominated work	Result
2014	Best Original Song	"Happy" (from Despicable Me 2)	Nominated
2017	Best Picture	Hidden Figures	Nominated

== American Music Awards ==
Year	Category	Nominated work	Result	Ref.
2013	Single of the Year	"Blurred Lines"(with Robin Thicke and T.I)	Nominated	
2014	Artist of the Year	Pharrell Williams	Nominated	
2014	Favorite Pop/Rock Male Artist	Pharrell Williams	Nominated	
2014	Favorite Soul/R&B Male Artist	Pharrell Williams	Nominated	
2014	Favorite Soul/R&B Album	Girl	Nominated	
2014	Single of the Year	"Happy"	Nominated	

== Annie Award ==
Year	Category	Nominated work	Result
2011	Best Music in a Feature Production	Despicable Me (with Heitor Pereira)	Nominated
2014	Best Music in a Feature Production	Despicable Me 2 (with Heitor Pereira)	Nominated

== Antville Music Video Awards ==
The Antville Music Video Awards are online awards for the best music video and music video directors of the year. They were first awarded in 2005.

Year	Category	Nominated work	Result
2013	Most Fun Video	Happy	Won
2013	Best Interactive	Happy	Won
2013	Best Choreography	Happy	Nominated
2014	Best Animated	It Girl	Won

== ARIA Music Awards ==
Year	Category	Nominated work	Result
2014	International Artist of the Year	Pharrell Williams	Nominated

== ASCAP Music Awards ==
Year	Category	Nominated work	Result
2012	ASCAP Golden Note Award	Pharrell Williams	Lost

=== ASCAP Film & Tv Music Awards ===
Year	Category	Nominated work	Result
2011	Top Box Office Films	"Despicable Me"	Won

== BBC Music Awards ==
Year	Category	Nominated work	Result
2014	International Artist of the Year	Pharrell Williams	Won
2014	Song of the Year	"Happy"	Lost

== Berlin Music Video Awards ==
Year	Category	Nominated work	Result
2023	Best Animation	Cash In Cash Out feat. 21 Savage & Tyler, The Creator	Won

== BET Hip Hop Awards ==
Year	Category	Nominated work	Result	Ref.
2013	Producer of the Year	Pharrell Williams	Nominated	
2014	Producer of the Year	Pharrell Williams	Nominated	
2014	Best Hip Hop Video	"Move That Dope" (with Future, Pusha T and Casino)	Nominated	
2014	Best Collabo, Duo or Group	"Move That Dope" (with Future, Pusha T and Casino)	Nominated	
2014	Best Club Banger	"Move That Dope" (with Future, Pusha T and Casino)	Won	
2014	People's Champ Award	"Move That Dope" (with Future, Pusha T and Casino)	Nominated	
2014	Sweet 16 (Best Featured Verse) (only Pharrell)	"Move That Dope"	Nominated	
2015	Producer of the Year	Pharrell Williams	Nominated	
2015	Song of the Year	"Alright" (as a producer)	Nominated	
2016	Producer of the Year	Pharrell Williams	Nominated	
2017	Producer of the Year	Pharrell Williams	Nominated	
2018	Producer of the Year	Pharrell Williams	Won	
2018	Song of the Year	"Apeshit" (as a producer)	Won	

== BET Awards ==
Year	Category	Nominated work	Result
2002	Video of the Year	"Pass the Courvoisier, Part II" (with Busta Rhymes)	Won
2003	Best Collaboration	"Beautiful" (with Snoop Dogg)	Won
2004	Best Collaboration	"Frontin'" (with Jay Z)	Nominated
2004	Best New Artist	Pharrell Williams	Nominated
2005	Best Collaboration	"Drop It Like It's Hot" (with Snoop Dogg)	Nominated
2014	Video of the Year	"Happy"	Won
2014	Viewer's Choice Award	"Happy"	Nominated
2014	Best Collaboration	"Blurred Lines"(with Robin Thicke and T.I.)	Nominated
2014	Best Male R&B/Pop Artist	Pharrell Williams	Won

== Billboard Music Awards ==
Year	Category	Nominated work	Result
2003	R&B Songwriter of the year	Pharrell Williams	Nominated
2005	Ringtone of the Year	""Drop It Like It's Hot""(with Snoop Dogg)	Nominated
2005	Rap Single of the Year	""Drop It Like It's Hot""(with Snoop Dogg)	Nominated
2014	Top Hot 100 Song	"Blurred Lines"(with Robin Thicke and T.I)	Won
2014	Top Radio Song	"Blurred Lines"(with Robin Thicke and T.I)	Won
2014	Top Digital Song	"Blurred Lines"(with Robin Thicke and T.I)	Won
2014	Top R&B Song	"Blurred Lines"(with Robin Thicke and T.I)	Won
2014	Top Streaming Song (Audio)	"Blurred Lines"(with Robin Thicke and T.I)	Nominated
2014	Top Streaming Song (Audio)	"Get Lucky" (with Daft Punk)	Nominated
2014	Top Dance/Electronic Song	"Get Lucky" (with Daft Punk)	Nominated
2014	Top R&B Song	"Happy"	Nominated
2014	Top R&B Artist	Pharrell Williams	Nominated
2015	Top R&B Song	"Happy"	Nominated
2015	Top Radio Song	"Happy"	Nominated
2015	Top Digital Song	"Happy"	Nominated
2015	Top Male Artist	Pharrell Williams	Nominated
2015	Top R&B Artist	Pharrell Williams	Won
2015	Top R&B Album	"G I R L"	Won

=== Billboard R&B/Hip-Hop Awards ===
Year	Category	Nominated work	Result
2005	Hot Rap Track	"Drop It Like It's Hot" (featuring Snoop Dogg)	Won
2005	Top R&B/Hip-hop Singles - Airplay	"Drop It Like It's Hot" (featuring Snoop Dogg)	Nominated
2005	Top R&B/Hip-hop Singles	"Drop It Like It's Hot" (featuring Snoop Dogg)	Nominated

== Black Reel Awards ==
Year	Category	Nominated work	Result	Ref.
2003	Best Original or Adapted Song	"Work It Out" (with Beyoncé, as a writer)	Nominated	
2014	Outstanding Original Song	"Happy"	Nominated	
2017	Outstanding Original Score	"Hidden Figures'"	Nominated	
2017	Outstanding Original Song	"Surrender"	Nominated	

== Brit Awards ==
Year	Category	Nominated work	Result
2015	International Male Solo Artist	Pharrell Williams	Won
2018	British Single of the Year	"Feels" (with Katy Perry and Calvin Harris)	Nominated
2018	British Video of the Year	"Feels" (with Katy Perry and Calvin Harris)	Eliminated

== Daytime Emmy Awards ==
Year	Category	Nominated work	Result	Ref.
2018	Outstanding Musical Performance in a Daytime Program	"Runnin'" (The Ellen DeGeneres Show)	Nominated	

== Denver Film Critics Society ==
Year	Category	Nominated work	Result
2017	Best Original Score	Hidden Figures	Nominated

== GAFFA Awards ==
=== GAFFA Awards (Denmark) ===
Delivered since 1991, the GAFFA Awards are a Danish award that rewards popular music by the magazine of the same name.

Year	Nominee / work	Award	Result	Ref.
2013	"Get Lucky" (with Daft Punk)	Best Foreign Song	Won	
2014	"Happy"	Best Foreign Song	Won	

== Gold Derby Awards ==
Year	Category	Nominated work	Result
2017	Best Picture	Hidden Figures	Nominated

== Golden Globe Awards ==
Year	Category	Nominated work	Result
2017	Best Original Score	Hidden Figures (with Hans Zimmer & Benjamin Wallfisch)	Nominated

== Grammy Awards ==
Year	Nominee / work	Award	Result	Ref.
2003	"Pass the Courvoisier, Part II"	Best Rap Performance by a Duo or Group	Nominated	
2003	Nellyville	Album of the Year	Nominated	
2004	Justified	Album of the Year	Nominated	
2004	Justified	Best Pop Vocal Album	Won	
2004	The Neptunes	Producer of the Year, Non-Classical	Won	
2004	"Frontin'"	Best Rap/Sung Collaboration	Nominated	
2004	"Beautiful"	Best Rap/Sung Collaboration	Nominated	
2004	"Beautiful"	Best Rap Song	Nominated	
2004	"Excuse Me Miss"	Best Rap Song	Nominated	
2005	"Drop It Like It's Hot"	Best Rap Song	Nominated	
2005	"Drop It Like It's Hot"	Best Rap Performance by a Duo or Group	Nominated	
2005	"She Wants to Move"	Best Urban/Alternative Performance	Nominated	
2006	"Hollaback Girl"	Record of the Year	Nominated	
2006	The Emancipation of Mimi	Album of the Year	Nominated	
2006	Love. Angel. Music. Baby.	Album of the Year	Nominated	
2006	The Neptunes	Producer of the Year, Non-Classical	Nominated	
2007	"Money Maker"	Best Rap Song	Won	
2007	In My Mind	Best Rap Album	Nominated	
2009	"Give It 2 Me"	Best Dance Recording	Nominated	
2013	Channel Orange	Album of the Year	Nominated	
2014	Random Access Memories	Album of the Year	Won	
2014	good kid, m.A.A.d city	Album of the Year	Nominated	
2014	"Get Lucky"	Record of the Year	Won	
2014	"Get Lucky"	Best Pop Duo/Group Performance	Won	
2014	"Blurred Lines"	Best Pop Duo/Group Performance	Nominated	
2014	"Blurred Lines"	Record of the Year	Nominated	
2014	Self	Producer of the Year, Non-Classical	Won	
2015	"Happy" (live)	Best Pop Solo Performance	Won	
2015	"Happy"	Best Music Video	Won	
2015	Girl	Best Urban Contemporary Album	Won	
2015	Girl	Album of the Year	Nominated	
2015	Beyoncé	Album of the Year	Nominated	
2015	x	Album of the Year	Nominated	
2016	To Pimp a Butterfly	Album of the Year	Nominated	
2016	"Alright"	Song of the Year	Nominated	
2016	"Alright"	Best Rap Song	Won	
2016	"Freedom"	Best Music Video	Nominated	
2018	Hidden Figures: The Album	Best Compilation Soundtrack for Visual Media	Nominated	
2018	Hidden Figures	Best Score Soundtrack for Visual Media	Nominated	
2019	Sweetener	Best Pop Vocal Album	Won	
2019	Self	Producer of the Year, Non-Classical	Won	
2023	Mr. Morale & the Big Steppers	Album of the Year	Nominated	
2026	Let God Sort Em Out	Album of the Year	Nominated	
2026	"Chains & Whips"	Best Rap Performance	Won	
2026	"The Birds Don't Sing"	Best Rap Song	Nominated	
2026	Piece by Piece	Best Music Film	Nominated	
2026	Self	Dr Dre Global Impact Award	Honored	

== Hollywood Film Awards ==
Year	Nominee / work	Award	Result
2019	"Letter to My Godfather" (from The Black Godfather)	Hollywood Song Award	Won

== Hollywood Music in Media Awards ==
Year	Nominee / work	Award	Result
2016	"Running"	Best Song – Feature Film	Nominated
2017	"There's Something Special"	Best Original Song - Animated Film	Nominated
2019	"Letter To My Godfather"	Best Original Song - Documentary	Nominated

== Hollywood Walk of Fame ==
Year	Nominee / work	Award	Result
2014	Pharrell Williams	Hollywood Walk of Fame	Won

== Houston Film Critics Society ==
Year	Nominee / work	Award	Result
2016	"Running"	Best Original Song	Nominated

== iHeartRadio Music Awards ==
Year	Category	Nominated work	Result
2014	Innovator Award	Pharrell Williams	Won
2014	Hip-Hop/R&B Song of the Year	"Blurred Lines"	Nominated
2014	EDM Song of the Year	"Get Lucky"	Nominated
2015	Song of the Year	"Happy"	Nominated

== International Dance Music Awards ==
Year	Category	Nominated work	Result
2005	Best Rap/Hip-Hop Dance Track	"Drop It Like It's Hot"	Won
2014	Best Commercial / Pop Dance Track	"Get Lucky"	Won
2014	Best Featured Vocalist Performance	"Get Lucky"	Nominated
2014	Best Music Video	"Get Lucky"	Nominated

== Kid's Choice Awards ==
Year	Category	Nominated work	Result
2014	Favorite Male Singer	Pharrell Williams	Nominated
2015	Favorite Male Singer	Pharrell Williams	Nominated

== Latin American Music Awards ==
Year	Category	Nominated work	Result
2018	Favorite Urban Song	"Safari" (ft J Balvin, BIA & Sky)	Nominated

== Latin Grammy Awards ==
Year	Category	Nominated work	Result
2022	Album of the Year	Motomami (as producer and songwriter)	Won

== Los Premios 40 Principales ==
Year	Category	Nominated work	Result
2013	Best International Song	"Blurred Lines" (with Robin Thicke and T.I.)	Nominated
2013	Best International Song	"Get Lucky" (with Daft Punk)	Nominated
2014	Best International Artist	Pharrell Williams	Nominated
2014	Best International Song	"Happy"	Nominated
2014	Best International Video	"Happy"	Nominated

== Los Premios 40 Principales América ==
Year	Category	Nominated work	Result
2014	Best English Language Song	"Get Lucky" (with Daft Punk)	Nominated
2014	Best English Language Song	"Happy"	Nominated
2014	Best English Language Song	"Blurred Lines" (with Robin Thicke and T.I.)	Nominated

== MOBO Awards ==
Year	Category	Nominated work	Result
2005	Best Single	"Drop It Like It's Hot" (featuring Snoop Dogg)	Nominated
2005	Best Video	"Drop It Like It's Hot" (featuring Snoop Dogg)	Won

== MTV Africa Music Awards ==
Year	Category	Nominated work	Result	Ref.
2014	Best International Act	Pharrell Williams	Won	

== MTV Australian Music Awards ==
Year	Category	Nominated work	Result
2006	Best Hip Hop Video	"Drop It Like It's Hot"	Won

== MTV Europe Music Awards ==
Year	Category	Nominated work	Result
2006	Best Male	Pharrell Williams	Nominated
2006	Best R&B	Pharrell Williams	Nominated
2013	Best Video	"Blurred Lines"	Nominated
2013	Best Song	"Blurred Lines"	Nominated
2013	Best Song	"Get Lucky"	Nominated
2014	Best Male	Pharrell Williams	Nominated
2014	Best World Stage Performance	Pharrell Williams	Nominated
2014	Best US Act	Pharrell Williams	Nominated
2014	Best Song	"Happy"	Nominated
2014	Best Video	"Happy"	Nominated
2015	Best Video	"Freedom"	Nominated
2015	Best Male	Pharrell Williams	Nominated

== MTV Millennial Awards ==
Year	Category	Nominated work	Result
2017	Video of the Year	"Safari" (ft. J Balvin BIA and Sky)	Nominated
2017	Best Collaboration	"Safari" (ft. J Balvin BIA and Sky)	Nominated

== MTV Video Music Awards ==
Year	Category	Nominated work	Result
2002	Best Hip-Hop Video	"Pass the Courvoisier, Part II"(with Busta Rhymes )	Nominated
2003	Best Hip-Hop Video	"Beautiful"(with Snoop Dogg)	Nominated
2003	Best Video from a Film	"Boys (The Co-Ed Remix)" (with Britney Spears)	Nominated
2005	Video of the Year	"Drop It Like It's Hot" (with Snoop Dogg)	Nominated
2005	Best Hip-Hop Video	"Drop It Like It's Hot" (with Snoop Dogg)	Nominated
2005	Viewer's Choice	"Drop It Like It's Hot" (with Snoop Dogg)	Nominated
2013	Video of the Year	"Blurred Lines" (with Robin Thicke)	Nominated
2013	Best Male Video	"Blurred Lines" (with Robin Thicke)	Nominated
2013	Best Collaboration	"Blurred Lines" (with Robin Thicke)	Nominated
2013	Best Song of the Summer	"Blurred Lines" (with Robin Thicke)	Nominated
2013	Best Song of the Summer	"Get Lucky" (with Daft Punk)	Nominated
2014	Video of the Year	"Happy"	Nominated
2014	Best Male Video	"Happy"	Nominated
2014	Best Pop Video	"Happy"	Nominated
2016	Best Choreography	"WTF (Where They From)" (with Missy Elliott)	Nominated
2017	Best Collaboration	"Feels" (with Katy Perry and Calvin Harris)	Nominated
2018	Best Collaboration	"Lemon" (with Rihanna and The Neptunes)	Nominated
2018	Best Editing	"Lemon" (with Rihanna and The Neptunes)	Won

== MTV Video Music Awards Japan ==
Year	Category	Nominated work	Result
2004	Best Male Video	"Frontin" (with Jay-Z)	Won
2004	Best Hip-Hop Video	"Change Clothes" (with Jay-Z)	Nominated
2014	Best Male Video	"Blurred Lines"(with Robin Thicke)	Nominated
2014	Best Collaboration	"Blurred Lines"(with Robin Thicke)	Nominated
2014	Best R&B Video	"Happy"	Nominated
2014	Best Male Video	"Lose Yourself to Dance" (with Daft Punk)	Nominated
2015	Video of the Year	"Freedom"	Nominated
2015	Best Male Video - International	"Freedom"	Won

== Much Music Video Awards ==
Year	Category	Nominated work	Result
2005	International Video of the Year	"Drop It Like It's Hot" (featuring Snoop Dogg)	Nominated
2007	International Video of the Year	"Money Maker" (featuring Ludacris)	Nominated
2014	International Video of the Year - Solo Artist	"Happy"	Nominated
2014	International Video of the Year – Group	"Lose Yourself to Dance" (featuring Daft Punk)	Nominated

== NAACP Image Awards ==
Year	Category	Nominated work	Result
2014	Outstanding Duo, Group or Collaboration	"Blurred Lines" (with Robin Thicke)	Won
2014	Outstanding Song	"Blurred Lines" (with Robin Thicke)	Nominated
2015	Outstanding Male Artist	Pharrell Williams	Won
2015	Outstanding Duo, Group or Collaboration	"Brand New" (with Justin Timberlake)	Nominated
2015	Outstanding Duo, Group or Collaboration	“Gust of Wind” (with Daft Punk)	Nominated
2015	Outstanding Album	"G.I.R.L."	Nominated
2016	Outstanding Male Artist	Pharrell Williams	Won
2016	Outstanding Music Video	"Freedom"	Nominated
2016	Outstanding Song, Contemporary	"Freedom"	Nominated
2017	Outstanding Song, Traditional	"I See Victory" (with Kim Burrell)	Won

== Neox Fan Awards ==
Year	Category	Nominated work	Result
2014	Best Song of The Year	"Happy"	Finalist

== People's Choice Awards ==
Year	Category	Nominated work	Result
2015	Favorite Male Artist	Pharrell Williams	Nominated
2015	Favorite R&B Artist	Pharrell Williams	Won
2015	Favorite Album	"G I R L"	Nominated

== Premio Lo Nuestro ==
Year	Category	Nominated work	Result
2017	Video of the Year	"Safari" (with J Balvin)	Nominated

== Producers Guild of America Awards ==
Year	Category	Nominated work	Result
2016	Best Theatrical Motion Picture	Hidden Figures	Nominated

== Radio Disney Music Awards ==
Year	Category	Nominated work	Result
2015	Best Male Artist	Pharrell Williams	Nominated
2015	Best Song That Makes You Smile	"Happy"	Nominated

== Satellite Awards ==
Year	Category	Nominated work	Result
2003	Best Original Song	"Work It Out" (with Beyoncé, as a writer)	Nominated
2014	Best Original Song	"Happy"	Nominated
2017	Best Original Score	"Hidden Figures"	Nominated

== Soul Train Music Awards ==
Year	Category	Nominated work	Result
2003	Best R&B/Soul or Rap Music Video	"Pass the Courvoisier, Part II" (featuring Busta Rhymes)	Nominated
2004	Best R&B/Soul Single – Male	"Frontin'" (featuring Jay Z)	Nominated
2005	Best R&B/Soul or Rap Dance Cut	"Drop It Like It's Hot" (featuring Snoop Dogg)	Won
2013	Song of the Year	"Blurred Lines" (featuring Robin Thicke)	Won
2013	Video of the Year	"Blurred Lines" (featuring Robin Thicke)	Nominated
2013	Best Dance Performance	"Blurred Lines" (featuring Robin Thicke)	Nominated
2013	Best Collaboration	"Blurred Lines" (featuring Robin Thicke)	Won
2014	Album of the Year	"G.I.R.L."	Nominated
2014	Song of the Year	"Happy"	Won
2014	Video of the Year	"Happy"	Won
2014	The Ashford & Simpson Songwriter's Award	"Happy"	Nominated
2014	Best R&B/Soul Male Artist	Pharrell Williams	Nominated

== Teen Choice Awards ==
Year	Category	Nominated work	Result
2013	Choice Music: Single by a Group	"Get Lucky"	Nominated
2013	Choice Summer Song	"Get Lucky"	Nominated
2013	Choice Summer Song	"Blurred Lines"	Nominated
2013	Choice Music Single: Male	"Blurred Lines"	Nominated
2014	Choice Music – Male Artist	Pharrell Williams	Nominated
2014	Choice Summer Music Star: Male	Pharrell Williams	Nominated
2014	Song: Male Artist	"Happy"	Nominated
