= The Gust of Wind =

The Gust of Wind may refer to:

- The Gust of Wind (Courbet), an 1865 painting
- The Gust of Wind (Renoir), an 1872 painting

== See also ==
- Gust of Wind
- Wind gust
