= Fantasista Utamaro =

Japanese artist

- Born: c. 1979 (age 46–47); Fuji, Shizuoka, Japan
- Occupations: Visual artist, art director, illustrator, graphic designer, textile designer, and animation director

Fantasista Utamaro (born c. 1979 in Fuji, Shizuoka, Japan) is a Japanese artist, art director, illustrator, and graphic designer based in Brooklyn, New York. He is considered to be one of the leading artists working in the Japanese pop art movement, whose work explores the concepts of celebration, culture, freedom, and unlimited possibilities through a pop culture lens.

Utamaro's work is known for its distinctive ultra pop and vivid technicolor style that pushes the traditional boundaries of art, which is inspired by Japanese pop culture such as Anime and Manga, and also influenced by Western art, including the work of Andy Warhol and Keith Haring.

== Biography ==
=== Early life and education ===
Fantasista Utamaro was born in Fuji, Shizuoka Prefecture, Japan, in 1979. He grew up in a small town and was interested in art from a young age. He began drawing and painting at a young age, and he was also interested in anime and manga. Utamaro attended Tama Art University in Tokyo, where he studied textile design. He graduated in 2002.

=== Career ===
After graduating from college in 2007, Utamaro moved to New York City to pursue his art career. He began working as a freelance artist, creating illustrations for magazines, books, advertising campaigns, packaging designs, and website design. He also began exhibiting his work in galleries and museums around the city.

In addition to his work, Utamaro established Saizen OO with designer Mikio Sakabe and has also collaborated with other artists and brands, including Takashi Murakami, Mr., Pharrell Williams, Louis Vuitton, SK-II, Nike, Converse, GU, and Adidas. In 2021, Utamaro collaborate with Nexus Studios and Factory Fifteen to produce commercial video for the BBC's 2020 Summer Olympics in Tokyo, which receive the BAFTA Awards for Best Titles & Graphic Identity.

== Exhibitions ==
=== Collections ===
Utamaro's work has been exhibited in galleries and museums around the world, including the Museum of Modern Art and the Brooklyn Museum in New York City; the Museum of Contemporary Art in Los Angeles; the Pompidou Center in Paris; the Mori Art Museum in Tokyo; and the Victoria and Albert Museum in London.

=== Notable works ===
- R4U: Respect for Utamaro (2023): An homage to the Edo period painter Utamaro Kitagawa, this work features a re-rendered Ukiyo-e with eyes, cane, and arms from anime characters, emoji from the internet generation, and good luck cats in Yose-e style.
- Fantasista (2015): A series of paintings that depict a variety of characters, including animals, robots, and humans, in a dynamic and colorful world.
- Anime Eyes (2014): A series of sculptures that feature large, anime-style eyes.
- Pop Manga (2013): A series of paintings that depict characters from Japanese popular culture in a brightly colored and exaggerated style.

== Videography ==
Year	Video	Artist	Notes	Ref
2012	Transfer	Livetune	Director	
2012	Tell Your World	Hatsune Miku feat. Livetune	Director	
2012	Take Your Way	Livetune	Director	
2014	It Girl	Pharrell Williams	Director	
2015	Hizumu Realism	Karasu wa Masshiro	Director	
2015	A Message	Kelala	Art Director, Animation	
2016	Afraid to be Cool	Miyavi	Director	
2016	Fire Bird	Miyavi	Director	
2018	Oto No Kuni	Kyary Pamyu Pamyu	Art Director	
2018	Lucky☆Orb	Hatsune Miku	Director	
2019	Kimi ga Iine Kuretara	Kyary Pamyu Pamyu	Art Director	
2021	BBC Summer Olympics Let's Go There	BBC	Art Direction and Design	
2022	Heartbeat	Nitecore	Director, Special Effects	
2023	The Edge	Atarashii Gakko!	Director	
2023	Grand Yozakura x Fantasista Utamaro	Glenfiddich	Director	

== Awards and recognitions ==
He has also received numerous awards for his work, including the Pictoplasma NYC Film Festival, Silhouette Film Festival Paris, Cannes Lions International Festival of Creativity - Young Director Award and the 2022 British Academy Television Craft Award for Best Titles & Graphic Identity. He has been featured in numerous publications, including The New York Times, The Wall Street Journal, and Vogue.
