= Come Get It Bae =

2013 single by Pharrell Williams

Single by Pharrell Williams

from the album Girl
- Released: March 6, 2014
- Studio: Glenwood Place Studios (Burbank, CA); South Beach Studios (Miami, FL); Chicago Recording Company (Chicago, IL)
- Genre: Funk
- Length: 3:21
- Label: Columbia
- Songwriter: Pharrell Williams
- Producer: Pharrell Williams

Pharrell Williams singles chronology
"Marilyn Monroe" (2014)	"Come Get It Bae" (2014)	"Gust of Wind" (2014)

Music video
- "Pharrell Williams - Come Get It Bae (Video)" on YouTube

"Come Get It Bae" is a song written, produced, and performed by American musician Pharrell Williams, with guest vocals from Miley Cyrus, from the former's second studio album Girl (2014). "Come Get It Bae" was released on March 6, 2014, through Columbia Records as the third single from the album.

"Come Get It Bae" is a funk song, and discusses sex through the metaphor of a motorcycle. The song received generally favorable reviews from music critics, who complimented its overall production, but were ambivalent towards its lyrical content. The song has since peaked at number 23 on the Billboard Hot 100 and reached number 108 on the French SNEP.

== Background and composition ==
"Come Get It Bae" (2014)
A 20-second sample of "Come Get It Bae", a funk song.

Williams first collaborated with Cyrus while producing the tracks "4x4" and "GetItRight" for her fourth studio album Bangerz (2013). It was announced that Cyrus would appear on Williams' second studio album Girl when its track listing was confirmed on February 25. Their collaboration, "Come Get It Bae", was premiered through iTunes Radio on February 28 during an exclusive streaming of the record before its official release on March 3. The "World of Red Bull" commercial premiered on March 3, 2014, and features a 30-second snippet of "Come Get It Bae". Williams performed the song on Good Morning America on April 7; Cyrus was not present, although her vocals were heard on the pre-recorded backing track. Tori Kelly also provides background vocals in the song's bridge section.

"Come Get It Bae" is a funk song with playful beat, which sees the incorporation of a "throbbing bass and handclaps". Williams delivers its verses, while Cyrus sings the chorus and is heard yelling "hey!" throughout the song. The metaphor "you want to ride my motorcycle?" is frequently heard during the chorus; it serves as an innuendo for sex, a recurring theme throughout Girl.

== Critical reception ==
"Come Get It Bae" received generally favorable reviews from music critics. Writing for Entertainment Weekly, Nick Catucci provided a favorable review; he wrote that Cyrus' background vocals "[made] for a beat with a restless edge", although he also felt that her contributions were "[sunk] too low into the mix". Carl Williott from Idolator opined that the track is "a worthy addition to their budding partnership", although he personally preferred Cyrus' appearance on "Smoke Signals" by Buddy, which Williams had produced shortly before premiering his own track. Michael Marotta from Vanyaland noted that Cyrus' repetition of the term "Bangerz" on her track "SMS (Bangerz)" was his favorite piece of Bangerz, and similarly noted that Cyrus' repetition of "hey!" had "the same effect" on "Come Get It Bae". Ashley Rose from Cambio compared the song's production to the works of the folk band The Lumineers and the track "Blurred Lines" by Robin Thicke.

In a more mixed review, Tim Jonze from The Guardian felt that "Come Get It Bae" misrepresented Girl's intended concept of "[celebrating] womankind", instead leaning towards the "recounting [of] how nice it is to have sex with pretty ladies." He joked that the sexual innuendos blended into its lyrics was "the kind of ungainly sexual metaphor that puts [Williams] up there with such renowned musical feminists as Mick Jagger and R. Kelly." Chris Kelly from Fact sarcastically remarked that "nothing says timeless like a song with 'bae' in the title and Miley Cyrus on the hook". Samuel Tolzmann from Pretty Much Amazing commented that the sole reason that "Come Get It Bae" was not worse than Cyrus' Williams-produced track "Get It Right" was "only because nothing could possibly be worse than that." In addition, 4Music called the song a "clap-along lady-admiring hit".

== Commercial performance ==
"Come Get It Bae" debuted at number 2 on the U.S. Billboard Bubbling Under Hot 100 Singles component chart, which represents the 25 tracks that failed to reach the flagship Billboard Hot 100. The track also charted at number 108 on the French SNEP. As of July 31, 2014, the song has peaked at number 23 on the Billboard Hot 100 and has gone on to receive Gold certification for sales of 500,000 copies by the RIAA.

== Music video ==
On July 23, 2014, an accompanying music video was released, directed by Luis Cerveró. In the video, dozens of female models dance one at a time for the camera. Cyrus and Williams both appear.

== Live performances ==
In April 2014, Williams sang "Come Get It Bae" on The Ellen DeGeneres Show. In May 2014, Williams performed the song as part of a medley at the iHeartRadio Awards where he received the iHeartRadio Innovator Award. He later sang it on The Voice and on Jimmy Kimmel Live. On June 29, 2014 Williams performed it as a part of a mashup with Missy Elliott's "Pass That Dutch" at the annual BET Awards at the Nokia center in Los Angeles, California.

== In popular culture ==
The song is featured in Red Bull's 2014 commercial "World of Red Bull." "Come Get It Bae" also appears in a season 2 episode of the hit soap opera Empire, "Be True". The episode aired 21 October 2015. "Come Get It Bae" also appears in a couple of 2017 Nissan TV commercials for Nissan Rogue and Nissan Murano crossover aired in Canada.

== Charts ==
=== Weekly charts ===
Chart (2014)	Peak position
Australia (ARIA)	61
Belgium (Ultratip Bubbling Under Flanders)	10
Belgium Urban (Ultratop Flanders)	3
Belgium (Ultratip Bubbling Under Wallonia)	6
Canada Hot 100 (Billboard)	25
Canada CHR/Top 40 (Billboard)	19
Czech Republic Singles Digital (ČNS IFPI)	32
France (SNEP)	108
Germany (Deutsche Black Charts)	12
Hungary (Rádiós Top 40)	27
Hungary (Stream Top 40)	8
Ireland (IRMA)	67
Netherlands (Dutch Top 40)	35
Netherlands (Single Top 100)	84
New Zealand (Recorded Music NZ)	30
Poland (Polish Airplay New)	4
Slovakia Singles Digital (ČNS IFPI)	41
UK Singles (Official Charts Company)	87
UK Hip Hop/R&B (Official Charts)	15
US Billboard Hot 100	23
US Hot R&B/Hip-Hop Songs (Billboard)	5
US Pop Airplay (Billboard)	12
US Rhythmic Airplay (Billboard)	16

=== Year-end charts ===
Chart (2014)	Position
US Hot R&B/Hip-Hop Songs (Billboard)	47

== Certifications ==
Region	Certification	Certified units/sales
Canada (Music Canada)	Platinum	80,000^{‡}
New Zealand (RMNZ)	Gold	7,500^{*}
United States (RIAA)	Gold	500,000^{‡}
^{*} Sales figures based on certification alone.^{‡} Sales+streaming figures based on certification alone.

== Release history ==
Region	Date	Format	Label
United States	May 20, 2014	Contemporary hit radio	i Am Other; Columbia
United States	May 20, 2014	Rhythmic contemporary radio	i Am Other; Columbia
United States	May 20, 2014	Urban contemporary radio	i Am Other; Columbia
Italy	August 29, 2014	Contemporary hit radio	Columbia
United Kingdom	September 1, 2014	Contemporary hit radio	Columbia
