= Despicable Me 2 (soundtrack) =

2013 soundtrack album

Despicable Me 2: Original Motion Picture Soundtrack

Soundtrack album by Heitor Pereira and Pharrell Williams
- Released: July 2, 2013
- Recorded: 2012
- Venues: Los Angeles, California; Miami, Florida; Las Vegas, Nevada
- Studios: Chalice Recording Studios; Circle House Studio; Newman Scoring Stage; Odds On Recording; Record Plant; Remote Control Productions; The Village Recorder
- Genre: Film soundtrack
- Length: 1:01:24
- Label: Back Lot Music
- Producers: Heitor Pereira; Pharrell Williams

Heitor Pereira chronology
The Smurfs (2011)	Despicable Me 2 (2013)	The Smurfs 2 (2013)

Pharrell Williams chronology
In My Mind (2006)	Despicable Me 2 (2013)	Girl (2014)

Singles from Despicable Me 2: Original Motion Picture Soundtrack
- 1. "Happy" Released: November 21, 2013; 2. "Just a Cloud Away" Released: March 25, 2022

Despicable Me 2: Original Motion Picture Soundtrack is the soundtrack album for the 2013 film Despicable Me 2. It was released on July 2, 2013, through Back Lot Music. The original music was composed by Heitor Pereira and Pharrell Williams, who previously scored for Despicable Me. The soundtrack featured 24 tracks – eight songs and the remainder of the album, consists of original score tracks. Out of the eight songs, three original tracks, written by Williams, were featured in the album as well as the tracks "Another Irish Drinking Song", "I Swear" and "Y.M.C.A." were incorporated into the album. Besides that, two tracks from Despicable Me: "Fun, Fun, Fun" and the titular track is also featured in the soundtrack.

The track "Happy", which was the only intended single from the album, was released on November 21, 2013, by Back Lot Music, and was also included in Williams' second studio album Girl (2014). A visual presentation of the track, directed by We Are from LA and advertised as "the world's first 24-hour music video", accompanied the single and went viral upon release. "Happy" topped the charts in over 19 countries and was the best-selling song of 2014 in the United States and the United Kingdom. The song received an Academy Award nomination for Best Original Song at the 86th Academy Awards, but lost to "Let It Go" from Frozen. "Just a Cloud Away" was released as the second single in March 2022, after gaining virality on TikTok.

== Background ==
The co-director of Despicable Me 2, Chris Renaud had recalled the "distinctive music of the first film" that born out of the collaboration between Pereira and Williams, leading them to work for its sequel. Pereira attributed that for El Macho, being a Mexican wrestler and the main antagonist, had to implement "full choir with a latin flair to emphasize his presence". Pereira also created new themes for the characters, including for the minions, whose themes needed to be "more threatening and menacing". Williams and Pereira discussed about several main themes for the album, and went ahead with the overarching theme, which was not about the characters but much about the air of the film. He added that the "continuity was honestly based on lifting people up emotionally".

Williams wrote three original songs, including the popular track "Happy" that was released as a single on November 21, 2013, to wider commercial success. In a 2014 interview to The New York Times, Williams recalled that the song was rejected nine times, by the producer Chris Meledandri, before finally being approved. He finished writing the song within 20 minutes. The song was initially intended to be written for CeeLo Green (who earlier sang another track "Scream"), but due to conflicts with CeeLo's record company Elektra Records, as he was on the verge of releasing his 2013 Christmas album, Williams himself sang the track, instead.

Speaking on the integration of the film songs into the score, Pereira said "Unless there is a reason in the story, you don't want it to be a surprise, so you have to tease the ears with what is going to come in the song before it begins".

== Promotions and marketing ==
As a part of promotions, Williams came up with a website 24hoursofhappy.com, launched to coincide with the single release, featuring a visual presentation of "Happy" advertised as being "the world's first 24-hour music video", directed by the French directing team We Are from LA. The video went viral upon its premiere, and attributed to the massive success of the song. The four-minute video edit of the song released on YouTube on November 21, and as of March 2018, it crossed over 1 billion views. Eight years after the film's release, Williams released the lyrical song "Just a Cloud Away" on March 25, 2022, to wider commercial response.

== Track listing ==
All music is composed by Heitor Pereira.

Track listing
No.	Title	Writer(s)	Performer	Length
1.	"Scream"	Pharrell Williams	Cee Lo Green	3:41
2.	"Another Irish Drinking Song"	Paul and Storm	Pierre Coffin	0:39
3.	"Just a Cloud Away"	Williams	Williams	2:56
4.	"Happy"	Williams	Williams	3:53
5.	"I Swear" (John Michael Montgomery)	Gary Baker, Frank J. Myers	Coffin	1:38
6.	"Y.M.C.A." (Village People)	Henri Belolo, Jacques Morali, Victor Willis	Coffin	2:55
7.	"Fun, Fun, Fun"	Williams	Williams	3:26
8.	"Despicable Me"	Williams	Williams	4:14
9.	"PX-41 Labs"			2:06
10.	"The Fairy Party"			1:27
11.	"Lucy and the AVL"			5:39
12.	"Goodbye Nefario"			1:27
13.	"Time for Bed"			1:27
14.	"Break-In"			3:00
15.	"Stalking Floyd Eaglesan"			1:35
16.	"Moving to Australia"			3:09
17.	"Going to Save the World"			1:25
18.	"El Macho"			1:27
19.	"Jillian"			0:47
20.	"Take Her Home"			1:29
21.	"El Macho's Lair"			3:32
22.	"Home Invasion"			1:57
23.	"The Big Battle"			7:23
24.	"Ba Do Bleep"	Johannes Brahms	Chris Renaud	0:14
Total length:				1:01:24

== Commercial performance ==
"Happy" topped the musical charts in over 19 countries. It topped the US Billboard Hot 100 for the week ending March 8, 2014, and the following week, and also topped the Hot 100 Airplay chart. It holds the record for the second-highest audience peak for a week on the Hot 100 Airplay, with 225.9 million impressions, only behind Robin Thicke's "Blurred Lines". It also topped the New Zealand Singles Chart holding the first position for 12 consecutive weeks, since January 2014, and broke the 36-year-long record for most weeks spent at #1, which was previously held by Boney M.'s 1970 single "Rivers of Babylon". It also became the best-selling single of UK and US in 2014, with 1.5 and 6.45 million copies sold for the year, respectively.

The soundtrack consecutively listed in the first 10 positions of the UK Soundtracks Chart by the Official Charts Company. It also topped the 86th position in Billboard 200, and further listed in number 19 in the Independent Albums chart and in the top-third of Billboard soundtracks chart, since 2014.

== Chart positions ==
Chart (2013–14)	Peak position
Belgian Albums (Ultratop Flanders)	163
Belgian Albums (Ultratop Wallonia)	160
UK Compilation Albums (OCC)	48
UK Soundtrack Albums (OCC)	9
US Billboard 200	86
US Independent Albums (Billboard)	19
US Top Soundtracks (Billboard)	3

== Accolades ==
At the 86th Academy Awards held on March 2, 2014, Williams' song "Happy" was nominated for Best Original Song, but lost to "Let It Go" from Frozen. When GQ magazine asked Williams "how badly" he wanted the Oscar, he responded: "When they read the results, my face was... frozen. But then I thought about it, and I just decided just to... let it go."

The music video for "Happy" was nominated for Best Male Video and Video of the Year at the 2014 MTV Video Music Awards. It also won the Grammy Award for Best Music Video at the 57th Annual Grammy Awards, and in the same ceremony, a live rendition of the song, won the Grammy Award for Best Pop Solo Performance. However, the song failed to shortlist at the Best Song Written for Visual Media category.

Accolades received by Despicable Me 2 (soundtrack)
Award	Date of ceremony	Category	Recipient(s)	Result	Ref.
Academy Awards	March 2, 2014	Best Original Song	Pharrell Williams for "Happy"	Nominated	
Annie Awards	February 1, 2014	Outstanding Achievement for Music in an Animated Feature Production	Heitor Pereira and Pharrell Williams	Nominated	
Black Reel Awards	February 13, 2014	Best Original or Adapted Song	Pharrell Williams for "Happy"	Nominated	
Critics' Choice Movie Awards	January 16, 2014	Best Song	Pharrell Williams for "Happy"	Nominated	
Guild of Music Supervisors Awards	February 26, 2014	Best Film Studio Music Department	Universal Pictures (Note: Also for the studio's 2013 films About Time, The Best Man Holiday, Fast & Furious 6, Identity Thief, Kick-Ass 2, Riddick, and Rush)	Nominated	
Satellite Awards	February 23, 2014	Best Original Song	Pharrell Williams for "Happy"	Nominated	
St. Louis Film Critics Association Awards	December 14, 2013	Best Soundtrack	Despicable Me 2	Nominated	
Teen Choice Awards	August 10, 2014	Choice Music Single: Male	Pharrell Williams for "Happy"	Nominated	
World Soundtrack Awards	October 25, 2014	Best Original Song Written Directly for a Film	Pharrell Williams for "Happy"	Won	

== Personnel credits ==
Credits adapted from CD liner notes:

=== Soundtrack ===
- Original songs written, composed and produced by: Pharrell Williams
- Incorporated tracks produced by: Ali Dee Theodore
- Arrangements: Andrew Coleman
- Edited by: Andrew Coleman
- Mixed by: Leslie Brathwaite, Fabian Marasciullo
- Recorded by: Andrew Coleman, Sean Phelan, Mike Larson, Eric Liljestrand
- Music assistance: John Connolly, Matthew Desrameaux, Sebastian Zuleta, Elizabeth Gallardo, Ghazi Hourani, Josh Gudwin, Brandon Jones

Newman Scoring Stage sessions

- Concertmaster: Norman Hughes
- Contractor: Suzie Katayama
- Orchestra leader: Bruce Fowler
- Instruments
- Cello: Dane Little, Erika Duke, Rudolph Stein, Stefanie Fife
- Drums: Curt Bisquera
- Marimba: Dan Greco
- Trombone: Alan Kaplan, Philip Teele, Steven Holtman
- Trumpet: John Fumo, Walter Fowler, Warren Luening
- Tuba: William Roper
- Violin: Alan Grunfeld, Gerardo Hilera, Mario De Lion, Natalie Leggett, Philip Vaiman, Susan Chatman, Vladimir Polimatidi

Vocalists

- Backing vocalists: Ashley L. Lee, Jasmine Murray, Rhea Dummett, Shamika Hightower, Terrence Rolle, Trevon Henderson (track 4)
- Vocals: Centre for Young Musicians (track 9)

=== Score ===
- Original score composed and produced by: Heitor Pereira, Pharrell Williams
- Additional arrangements: Anthony Willis, Bobby Tahouri
- Additional composition: Azeo Torre, Cameron Hotchkis, Sebastian Zuleta, Ted Reedy
- Recorded by: Alan Meyerson, Kevin Globerman
- Edited by: Slamm Andrews
- Mixed by: Alan Meyerson
- Mixing assistance: Christian Wenger
- Mastered by: Reuben Cohen
- Music supervisor: Rachel Levy
- Music contractor: Peter Rotter
- Scoring crew: Denis St. Amand, Tim Lauber, Tom Steel

Choir

- Contractor: Jasper Randall
- Bass vocals: Alvin Chea, Bob Joyce, Eric Bradley, Greg Davies, Gregg Geiger, Jim Campbell, Jules Green, Mark Edward Smith, Michael Geiger, Stephen Grimm, Steve Pence, Will Goldman
- Soprano vocals: Cindy O'Connor, Holly Sedillos, Jenny Graham, Jessica Rotter, Karen Whipple Schnurr, Suzanne Waters, Teri Koide
- Tenor vocals: Aj Teshin, Chris Mann, Dick Wells, Fletcher Sheridan, Gerald White, Jasper Randall, Jeff Gunn, Joseph Golightly, John Kimberling, Sean Mcdermott, Steve Amerson, Steven Harms
- Children's choir: Alaman Diadhou, Aria Gunn, Catherine Matthews, Christian Mancuso, Cole Konis, Emily Titman, Emma Gunn, Hannah Messinger, Joe Matthews, Joss Saltzman, Karissa Lee, Levi Gunn, Marlowe Peyton, Mason Purece, Max Kilpatrick, Merit Leighton

Newman Scoring Stage sessions

- Concertmaster: Norman Hughes
- Contractor: Suzie Katayama
- Conductor: Nick Glennie-Smith
- Orchestra leader: Bruce Fowler
- Orchestrator: Ladd McIntosh
- Instruments
- Bass: Nico Abondolo, Adam Blackstone, David Parmeter, Drew Dembowski, Edward Meares, John Leftwich, Steve Dress, Timothy Lefebvre
- Bassoon: Rose Corrigan, Ken Munday
- Cello: Steve Erdody, Andrew Shulman, Armen Ksajikian, Cecilia Tsan, Christina Soule, Dennis Karmazyn, Erika Duke-Kirkpatrick, George Kim Scholes, John Walz, Paula Hochhalter, Tim Landauer, Trevor Handy
- Clarinet: Stuart Clark, Dan Higgins, Greg Huckins, Jeff Driskill
- Flute: Geraldine Rotella, Daniel Higgins, Jeff Driskill, Stephan Kujala
- Guitar: Clay Sears, John McCurry
- Horn: James Thatcher, Allen Fogle, Brian O'connor, Daniel Kelley, Dylan Hart, Jennie Kim, Laura Brenes, Mark Adams, Steve Becknell, Yvonne Suzette Moriarty
- Keyboards: Darek Cline Cobbs, Sarah Schmidt
- Oboe: Phil Ayling, Chris Bleth
- Percussion: Aaron Draper, Marvin B. Gordy III, Michael Klein, Steve McKie, Zachary Danziger
- Trombone: Alexander Iles, Alan Kaplan, William Reichenbach, Charlie Morillas, Phillip Teele, Phillip Keen, Steven Holtman
- Trumpet: Jon Lewis, Aaron Smith, Bijon Watson, Daniel Fornero, Daniel Rosenboom, David Washburn, Gary Grant, Jose Hernandez, Rick Baptist, Wayne Bergeron
- Tuba: Doug Tornquist, Gary Hickman
- Viola: Brian Dembow, Andrew Duckles, Darrin Mc Cann, David Walther, Matthew Funes, Robert Brophy, Roland Kato, Shawn Mann, Victoria Miskolczy
- Violin: Bruce Dukov, Julie Gigante, Alyssa Park, Ana Landauer, Charlie Bisharat, Darius Campo, Eun-Mee Ahn, Helen Nightengale, Irina Voloshina, Jay Rosen, Jessica Guideri, Josefina Vergara, Katia Popov, Kevin Connolly, Lisa Liu, Maya Magub, Natalie Leggett, Phillip Levy, Roger Wilkie, Sara Parkins, Sarah Thornblade, Serena Mc Kinney, Tamara Hatwan, Tereza Stanislav

Featured instrumentalists

- Percussion: MB Gordy
- Bass: John Leftwich
- Trumpet: Bijon Watson, Dan Fernero, Rick Baptist, Wayne Bergeron

Management

- Executive producer: Chris Meledandri
- Executive in charge of music: Michael Knobloch
- Music business affairs: Philip M. Cohen
- Music preparation: Booker White
- Product manager: Jake Voulgarides
- Design: Jennifer Wroblewski, Ken Matsubara, Peter Lung
