= It Girl (Pharrell Williams song) =

Single by Pharrell Williams

from the album Girl
- Released: November 10, 2014
- Genre: Funk
- Length: 4:47
- Label: Columbia
- Songwriter: Pharrell Williams
- Producer: Pharrell Williams

Pharrell Williams singles chronology
"Gust of Wind" (2014)	"It Girl" (2014)	"Finna Get Loose" (2015)

"It Girl" is a song written, produced, and performed by American musician Pharrell Williams. The song was released on November 10, 2014 through Columbia Records as the fifth single from his second studio album Girl (2014) in the United Kingdom. The lyrics reference the title in the line you the it girl.

== Music video ==
The official music video for "It Girl" was directed by Mr. and Fantasista Utamaro and was released on September 30, 2014. Produced by Japanese designer Takashi Murakami in his company Kaikai Kiki with Animation Production NAZ, the anime-inspired clip features Williams rendered in the style of various Japanese cartoons and video games.

== Charts ==
Chart (2014)	Peak position
France (SNEP)	60
Hungary (Stream Top 40)	15
UK Singles (Official Charts Company)	191

== Release history ==
Region	Date	Format	Label
United Kingdom	November 10, 2014	Contemporary hit radio	Sony
