= Mr. (artist) =

Japanese artist

'Mr.
- Born: September 21, 1969 (age 56); Cupa, Japan
- Occupation: Artist

Masakatsu Iwamoto (イワモト・マサカズ, Iwamoto Masakazu) (born September 21, 1969 in Cupa, Japan), known professionally as Mr., is a Japanese contemporary artist, based in Saitama Prefecture, Japan. A former protégé of Takashi Murakami, Mr.'s work debuted in both solo and group exhibitions in 1996, and has since been seen in museum and gallery exhibitions in Tokyo, Osaka, Nagoya, Hong Kong, Seoul, Daegu, Paris, New York, Minneapolis, Chicago, Miami, Jerusalem, Los Angeles, and London.

He works in a wide range of media, including painting, sculpture, and video, though his works are all closely related in aesthetics, style, and theme. A self-proclaimed otaku with a Lolita complex, which he says he does not act upon, his pieces depict young boys and girls in an anime/manga style, drawing upon the aesthetics and attitudes of otaku culture, and lolicon themes. While quite cute and innocent on the surface, many of his works are also quite sexualized, tying into the anime phenomenon of fanservice, and leaving it an open question as to how innocent his works are in the end. Critics have also questioned whether Mr.'s work reflects a commentary on otaku culture, or glimpses into a private fantasy world, though Mr. has said his art is about expressing his personal fantasies, and not about cultural commentary.

== Biography ==
Born in Cupa, Japan, Mr. takes his pseudonym from that of former Yomiuri Giants baseball player Shigeo Nagashima, who was frequently referred to as "Mr. Giants". Mr. graduated from Sokei Art School in 1996, having been discovered by Murakami the year prior. He has since worked as an assistant to Murakami, and member of Murakami's Kaikai Kiki studio, which has also supported Mr. in his solo career. His participation in Murakami's 2000 exhibition Super Flat played a crucial role in earning him international attention and recognition.

It is said that Mr. made his first "impression in the contemporary art scene with a collection of drawings of anime-style girl characters using the backs of shopping receipts he had gathered from his day-to-day purchases." UCLA studio art professor and contemporary artist in his own right Paul McCarthy has commented that "the blending of a Lolita complex and otaku culture in his works ... [has] 'an unbearable irresistibility in its tiny, innocent world.'"

A short film entitled "Nobody Dies" (誰も死なない, Daremo shinanai), directed by Mr. and premiered at Geisai 11 in Tokyo, accompanied by photos of the film's characters (i.e. the film's actresses, in costume as their characters, on the film's sets), was the artist's first forays into the media of video art and still photography. In 2010, Mr. exhibited in a group show at the Grimaldi Forum in Monaco, entitled Exhibition Kyoto-Tokyo: From Samurais to Mangas and had a solo exhibition at Leeahn Gallery in Seoul.

Mr. has exhibited in solo and group shows at major museums and galleries worldwide. In 2002, he exhibited with Rei Sato at the Fondation Cartier pour l'Art Contemporain; and in 2006 with fellow Kaikai Kiki artists Chiho Aoshima and Aya Takano at Musée d'art contemporain de Lyon. In the same year Mr. was also featured in the group exhibition Red Hot: Asian Art Today from the Chaney Family Collection at the Museum of Fine Arts, Houston. In 2005, he was included in the acclaimed exhibition Little Boy: The Arts of Japan's Exploding Subculture at Japan Society, New York. In 2014 he had a solo exhibition at the Seattle Art Museum.

In 2014, Mr. directed the music video for Pharrell Williams' song It Girl. The visuals in the video have a motif inspired by anime and video games.

== Literature ==
- Melissa Chu, Tamaki Saito, Mr., Galerie Perrotin, Paris, 2011
- Michele Robecchi, Xiaojin Wu, Live On: Mr.'s Japanese Neo Pop, Seattle Art Museum, 2014
