= Just a Cloud Away =

2013 song by Pharrell Williams

Single by Pharrell Williams

from the album Despicable Me 2: Original Motion Picture Soundtrack
- Released: March 24, 2022
- Recorded: 2013
- Length: 2:56
- Label: Back Lot Music; Sony Music Publishing
- Songwriter: Pharrell Williams
- Producers: Pharrell Williams; Ali Theodore; Heitor Pereira

Pharrell Williams singles chronology
"Entrepreneur" (2020)	"Just a Cloud Away" (2022)	"Cash In Cash Out" (2022)

"Just a Cloud Away" is a song written, produced, and performed by American musician Pharrell Williams from the soundtrack album for the film Despicable Me 2, released on July 2, 2013. The song was re-released as a single on March 24, 2022, almost nine years after the original release, after gaining significant traction on TikTok.

== Critical reception ==
HotNewHipHop praised the song as a "worthy addition to a respectable catalogue." Elena Cavender of Mashable called the song a "rare TikTok sound that’s first and foremost a song, rather than a vehicle for a trend."

== Commercial performance ==
Streams of the song increased by 5,776% in March 2022 following a trend on TikTok. "Just a Cloud Away" was the 5th most popular song on TikTok in 2022. As of December 2024, it is the 13th most popular song by Williams in the United Kingdom.

== Charts ==
Chart performance for "Just a Cloud Away"
Chart (2022)	Peak position
Canada Hot 100 (Billboard)	84
France (SNEP)	86
Global 200 (Billboard)	122
Ireland (IRMA)	47
Netherlands (Single Top 100)	90
New Zealand (Recorded Music NZ)	27
UK Audio Streaming (Official Charts)	78
UK Indie (Official Charts)	3
UK Singles (Official Charts)	99
US Bubbling Under Hot 100 (Billboard)	3
US Digital Song Sales (Billboard)	40
US Hot R&B/Hip-Hop Songs (Billboard)	34

== Certifications ==
Certification for "Just a Cloud Away"
Region	Certification	Certified units/sales
New Zealand (RMNZ)	Gold	15,000^{‡}
United Kingdom (BPI)	Silver	200,000^{‡}
^{‡} Sales+streaming figures based on certification alone.
