= Marilyn Monroe (Pharrell Williams song) =

Single by Pharrell Williams

from the album Girl
- Released: March 10, 2014
- Recorded: 2013
- Genre: Funk
- Length: 5:51
- Label: I Am Other; Columbia
- Songwriters: Pharrell Williams; Ann Marie Calhoun
- Producer: Pharrell Williams

Pharrell Williams singles chronology
"Aerosol Can" (2014)	"Marilyn Monroe" (2014)	"Come Get It Bae" (2014)

"Marilyn Monroe" is a song written, produced, and performed by American musician Pharrell Williams. It features additional spoken vocals from British TV personality Kelly Osbourne. The song was released on March 10, 2014, as the second single from Williams' second album Girl (2014). The song's intro was written by American violinist Ann Marie Calhoun. It is named for the actress Marilyn Monroe.

== Composition ==
"Marilyn Monroe" (2014)
A 29-second sample of "Marilyn Monroe", an R&B and funk song.

The opening track on Williams' second studio album, Girl (2014), "Marilyn Monroe" begins with an orchestral string introduction. The song's production is characterized by Williams' signature "skittering" beat and "bumping" bass line, and its lyrics discuss "helpless romantics and the perfect lady." Its chorus contains references to several female historical figures, including actress Marilyn Monroe, Egyptian queen Cleopatra, and French heroine Joan of Arc. In the song's lyrics, Williams dismisses all three as "[meaning] nothing to [him]" and laments that he "just [wants] a different girl." Kelly Osbourne provides spoken backing vocals on the song.

== Release ==
In an interview with New York radio station Power 105.1, Williams revealed that "Marilyn Monroe" would be released as the second single from G I R L. On March 10, 2014, the single was added to the playlist of British urban contemporary radio station BBC Radio 1Xtra along with the Williams song "Brand New". Prior to its single release, the song had debuted at number 52 on the Dutch Single Top 100 chart. Professional dancer Khadija Nicholas was hired by Pharrell to pose for the single's cover.

== Track listing ==
- CD single (Germany)
1. "Marilyn Monroe"
2. "Marilyn Monroe" (instrumental)

== Music video ==
The music video for the song, directed by Luis Cerveró, was released on April 23, 2014. It features Williams admiring and performing with different women on numerous sets.

=== Plot ===
The video begins with Williams admiring a woman on a dreamy set; when he goes to embrace her, she disappears into air. This is revealed to be a dream as Williams wakes up and bikes to a female dance class. After mingling with his bandmates and the dancers, he performs the song's chorus with them. During sections in the chorus where Williams repeats the word "Girl", multiple brief scenes of different women are shown. Next, Williams walks to a set divided into three colors (red, blue, and white), with groups of female dancers assigned to each of them. During an instrumental interlude, girls in casual outfits are also shown performing choreography on a rooftop, on which Williams and Osbourne emerge, an arrow in the former's heart. Williams is next shown back on the dream set, where the first woman reappears, this time playing a bass inside an artificial moon. During the final chorus, Pharrell and a large group of girls perform together, with him singing right near a woman dressed in the multi-color set's all three colors.

== Credits and personnel ==
- Pharrell Williams – lead vocals, songwriting, all instrumentation, production, executive production
- Ann Marie Calhoun – songwriting
- Hans Zimmer – songwriting
- Kelly Osbourne – background vocals

== Charts ==
=== Weekly charts ===
Chart (2014)	Peak position
Australia (ARIA)	29
Belgium (Ultratop 50 Flanders)	11
Belgium Dance (Ultratop Flanders)	6
Belgium Urban (Ultratop Flanders)	4
Belgium (Ultratop 50 Wallonia)	38
Belgium (Ultratip Bubbling Under Wallonia)	1
Belgium Dance (Ultratop Wallonia)	10
Denmark (Tracklisten)	28
France (SNEP)	27
Germany (Deutsche Black Charts)	2
Germany (GfK)	25
Hungary (Stream Top 40)	6
Ireland (IRMA)	35
Netherlands (Dutch Top 40)	13
Netherlands (Single Top 100)	18
Scottish Singles Sales (Official Charts)	27
Slovakia Airplay (ČNS IFPI)	58
Slovakia Singles Digital (ČNS IFPI)	45
Slovenia (SloTop50)	31
South Africa Airplay (EMA)	9
South Korea (Gaon International Chart)	6
UK Singles (Official Charts)	25
UK Hip Hop/R&B (Official Charts)	5
US Bubbling Under Hot 100 (Billboard)	9
US Hot R&B/Hip-Hop Songs (Billboard)	29

=== Year-end charts ===
Chart (2014)	Position
Belgium (Ultratop 50 Flanders)	79
Belgium Dance (Ultratop Flanders)	16
Belgium Urban (Ultratop Flanders)	14
Belgium Dance (Ultratop Wallonia)	35
France (SNEP)	108
Netherlands (Dutch Top 40)	50
Netherlands (Single Top 100)	96

== Certifications ==
Region	Certification	Certified units/sales
Australia (ARIA)	Gold	35,000^{^}
Germany (BVMI)	Gold	150,000^{‡}
^{^} Shipments figures based on certification alone.^{‡} Sales+streaming figures based on certification alone.

== Release history ==
Region	Date	Format	Label
United Kingdom	March 10, 2014	Urban contemporary radio	i Am Other; Columbia
Australia	April 7, 2014	Contemporary hit radio	i Am Other; Columbia
Italy	April 29, 2014	Contemporary hit radio	Sony
United Kingdom	May 12, 2014	Contemporary hit radio	Sony
Germany	May 30, 2014	CD single	Sony
