= Grégoire Guillemin =

French painter

Greg. "Léon" Guillemin
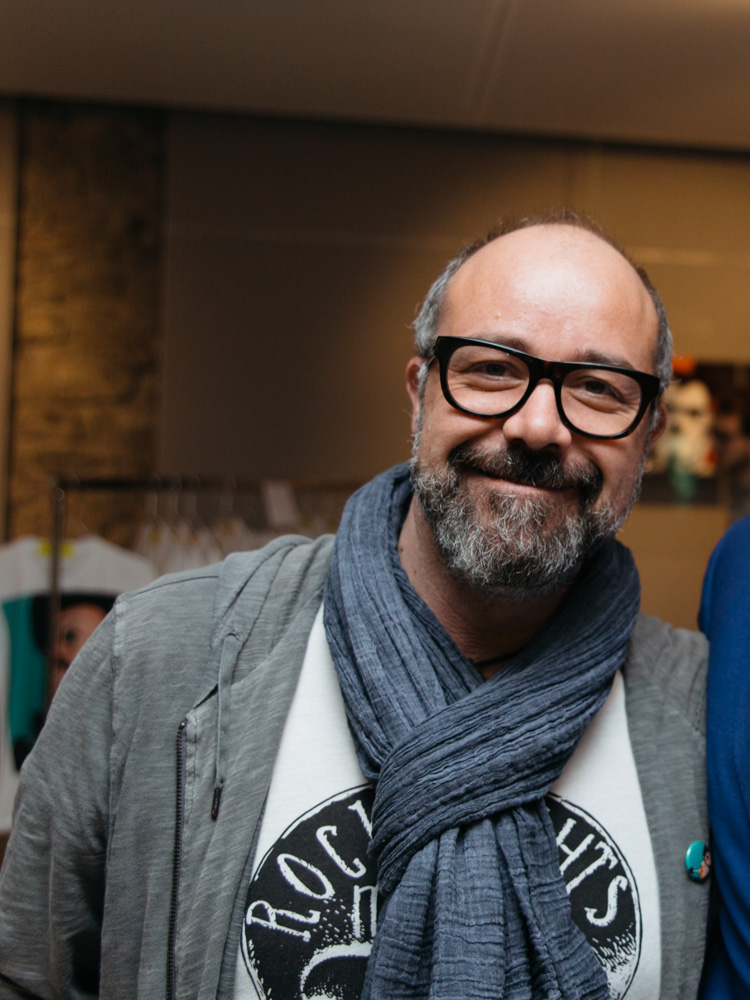
- Greg Guillemin, October 2015
- Born: Grégoire Guillemin; 22 December 1967 (age 58)
- Education: LEI du livre et des arts graphiques
- Known for: Visual Artist
- Notable work: The Secret Life of Heroes (2013-series still running)

Grégoire "Greg" Guillemin (born 22 December 1967) is a French artist known for his pop art paintings depicting comic books superheroes, movie characters, and otherwise popular characters. He lives and works in Paris, France.

In January 2013, he started releasing a series of digital drawings named "The Secret Life of Heroes". The series shows popular culture characters in their fictional mundane everyday life. These drawings gained substantial fame with publications the same year in major print media like Beaux Arts Magazine, Playboy and GQ among others. The series first included digital art only before Guillemin started painting the pictures on canvas using acrylic paint in March 2013. In January 2014, Guillemin started releasing sculptures, further expanding the body of his work.

In February 2015, Guillemin launched a crowdfunding campaign on Kickstarter in order to finance publishing of a first monograph entitled For Your Eyes Only. The project raised $62'282 in 30 days from 793 backers. The first edition of the book has been drawn to 1'500 units following the crowdfunding campaign and a second edition was subsequently drawn to 3'000 units later that year.

Guillemin's work has been shown in several contemporary art galleries across various major cities in Europe and the United States, including Paris, Geneva, London, Rome, New York City and Miami Beach.

== Sources ==
- Guillemin, Grégoire. For Your Eyes Only. Tind éditions, 2015. ISBN 979-1093749099
