= The Gust of Wind (Courbet) =

Painting by Gustave Courbet

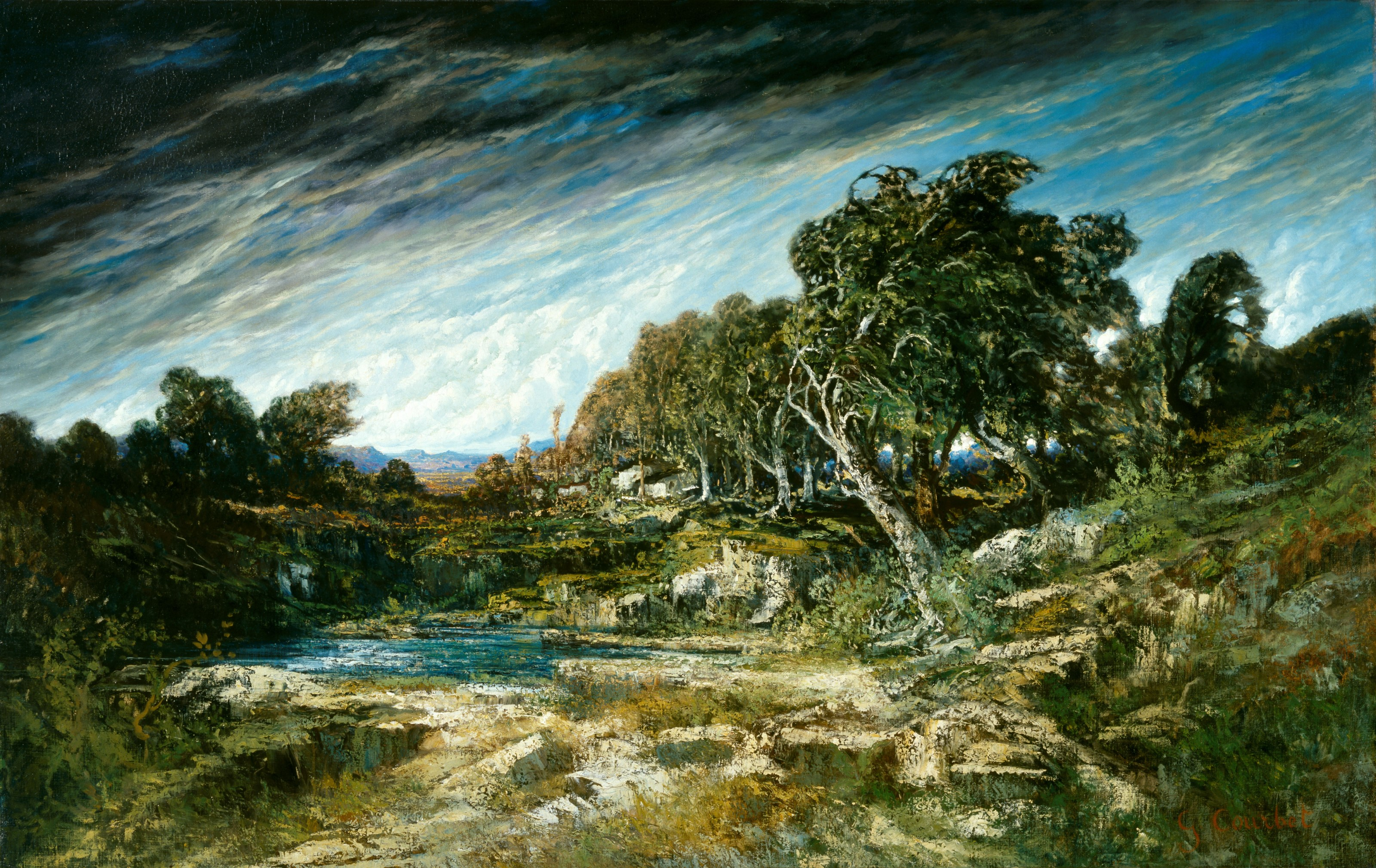
- Artist: Gustave Courbet
- Year: c. 1865
- Medium: Oil on canvas
- Dimensions: 146.7 cm × 230.8 cm (57.8 in × 90.9 in)
- Location: Museum of Fine Arts, Houston

The Gust of Wind is an oil-on-canvas painting created by Gustave Courbet circa 1865. It is in the Museum of Fine Arts, Houston. The Gust of Wind has been described as having "powerful diagonals".
