= The Gust of Wind (Renoir) =

Painting by Pierre-Auguste Renoir in the Fitzwilliam Museum

- High Wind (English), Le grand vent (French)
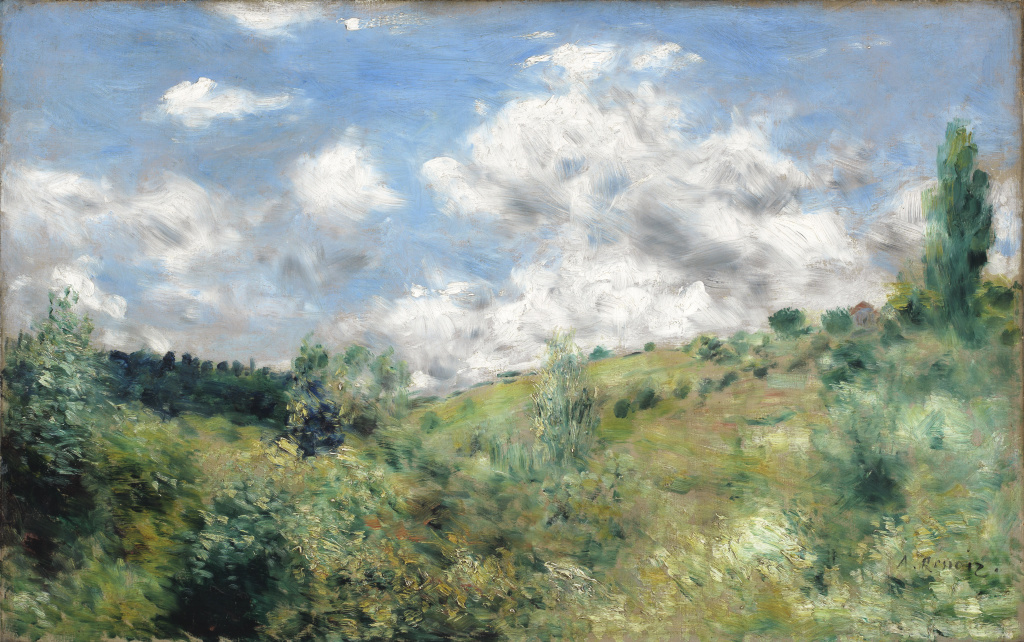
- Artist: Pierre-Auguste Renoir
- Completion date: 1870s, probably 1872
- Medium: Oil paint on canvas
- Movement: Impressionism
- Dimensions: 52 cm × 82.5 cm (20 in × 32.5 in)
- Location: Fitzwilliam Museum, Cambridge, England
- Accession: 2403
- Website: data.fitzmuseum.cam.ac.uk/id/object/2910

The Gust of Wind (French: Le grand vent), alternatively titled Le Coup de Vent or High Wind, is an oil-on-canvas painting completed in 1872 by the French artist Pierre-Auguste Renoir. The composition portrays wind sweeping across the hilly terrain in the Île-de-France region. It is part of Renoir's plein air landscape series from the 1870s, during the height of the Impressionist movement, and is currently housed at the Fitzwilliam Museum, Cambridge.

== Background ==
Renoir's formative artistic training began in the 1860s under the tutelage of Charles Gleyre, where he studied alongside prominent figures such as Claude Monet and Alfred Sisley. They would form close ties with Paul Cézanne and Camille Pissarro, fellow artists at the Académie Suisse. Art critic Jules-Antoine Castagnary later articulated the central ambition of the early Impressionists, emphasizing their wish to capture "not the landscape but the sensation produced by the landscape".

Scholars generally attribute The Gust of Wind to the summers of 1872 and 1873, (Note: During the mid to late 20th century, the painting was often dated to 1878. That date was later revised based on a reappraisal of the style. See House, John (February 2001). "Impression. London, Amsterdam and Williamstown". The Burlington Magazine. 143 (1175) (February 2001), p. 106, fn (p.164).) a time frame described as classic Impressionism, and a period marked by Renoir's collaboration with Monet. While debates persist regarding the precise date and location of the painting's creation, it is thought to either depict the specific Saint-Cloud area, or the general region of Île-de-France. A related work, After the Storm (1872), shares similar thematic concerns and may have been executed contemporaneously in the same place. Notably, The Gust of Wind was completed just prior to the First Impressionist Exhibition in 1874.

== Description ==
The painting illustrates the powerful movement of wind through the grasses and trees, beneath a blue sky punctuated by white clouds. Above the hillside, a solitary house is visible on the distant horizon. Renoir's treatment of this scene is emblematic of his approach during the 1870s, when he often left works in a preparatory ébauche state, with visible underpainting. His use of contrasting warm and cool tones, achieved through combinations such as viridian green with alizarin crimson or viridian with cobalt blue, creates dynamic shadowing. The canvas reveals his application of an ecru or biscuit-colored ground (primer), particularly evident in the lower right section, below the house on the horizon.

In diverging from the academic conventions of his predecessors, Renoir's depiction of wind here is not allegorical but rather a natural phenomenon, a visual effect integrated into a scene of modern life. Art historian Jane Munro suggests that Renoir's ambition was to capture the elusive nature of air itself, an invisible force rendered perceptible through his loose brushstrokes. This sense of movement is further underscored by landscape art specialist Malcolm Andrews, who likens the blurriness of Renoir's technique to that of a film camera (Note: For a brief moment in time, Impressionist painters had a slight edge in capturing their subjects spontaneously in the field over that of traditional photographers in the 1870s. Impressionist painters working en plein air were mobile, traveled light, and could complete an entire painting in as little as 15 minutes. Traditional photographers, however, were weighted down by heavy equipment and needed a great deal of time to get to the area in question, set up their equipment, and finally frame and capture the subject, landscape or otherwise. In the time an Impressionist painter could complete a scene where the environment and lighting changed moment to moment, a photographer of the time would miss the shot. The technical limitations of photography in the 1870s also made Impressionist painters more flexible and adaptive to the changing conditions. For a discussion of the advantages Impressionists had over photographers of the time, see Modrak & Anthes, Reframing Photography (2011), pp. 33-36.) capturing the effects of wind on the landscape with a slow shutter speed. The indistinct quality of the foreground evokes the experience of observing the scene from a moving train.

== Provenance ==
Renoir, along with Claude Monet, Berthe Morisot, and Alfred Sisley, organized two major Impressionist auctions in the late 1870s, one in 1875 and another in 1877. The first auction contained at least six of Renoir's landscapes, the second featured only two. The Gust of Wind was listed as Grand Vent (Paysage) in the 1875 auction catalog as one of 20 works offered for sale by Renoir at the Hôtel Drouot in Paris on 24 March 1875. The auction was met with anger from the public, and Renoir's paintings sold poorly and for low prices. The painting was purchased by artist Auguste de Moulins in 1875 for a mere 55 francs. After passing through several hands, including those of Paul Durand-Ruel (1899), Alphonse Kahn (1908), and Frank Hindley Smith (1923), it was bequeathed by Smith to the Fitzwilliam Museum in 1939.

== See also ==
- List of paintings by Pierre-Auguste Renoir
