= Gust of Wind =

2014 single by Pharrell Williams

Single by Pharrell Williams

from the album Girl
- Released: October 24, 2014
- Genre: Disco; funk
- Length: 4:47
- Label: Columbia
- Songwriters: Pharrell Williams; Thomas Bangalter; Guy-Manuel de Homem-Christo
- Producer: Pharrell Williams

Pharrell Williams singles chronology
"Come Get It Bae" (2014)	"Gust of Wind" (2014)	"It Girl" (2014)

Music video
- "Gust of Wind" on YouTube

"Gust of Wind" is a song written, produced, and performed by American musician Pharrell Williams. Written alongside Daft Punk (who also provided vocals), it was released on October 24, 2014 by Columbia Records as the fourth single from Williams's second studio album Girl (2014).

This is Williams' fifth collaboration with Daft Punk; the first being the Neptunes remix of "Harder, Better, Faster, Stronger" for Daft Club (2003), followed by N.E.R.D's "Hypnotize U", co-written & produced alongside Daft Punk for the former's fourth studio album Nothing (2010), and Williams' vocals on "Get Lucky" and "Lose Yourself to Dance" from Daft Punk's fourth and final studio album Random Access Memories (2013).

== Music video ==
The official music video was directed by Edgar Wright (Shaun of the Dead, Hot Fuzz, Baby Driver). It was released on October 7, 2014. The video depicts Williams dancing with women in a forest in autumn, with Daft Punk represented by stone sculptures of their helmets.

== Live performances ==
On October 12, 2014, Williams performed "Gust of Wind" on the first live results show of The X Factor.

== Charts ==
Upon Girl's release, individual downloads to "Gust of Wind" were enough for it to debut in the top-40 of the sales chart for France, and UK's R&B/Hip-Hop chart. Following its October 2014 single release, "Gust of Wind" hovered around the bottom of the top 100 UK Singles Chart for four weeks, mainly driven by downloads, while enjoying a six-week top-20 run on the R&B/Hip-Hop chart, three of those at its number-12 peak. As of December 2024, "Gust of Wind" is Pharrell's 19th highest-selling single in the UK.

Chart (2014)	Peak position
Belgium (Ultratip Bubbling Under Flanders)	2
Belgium Urban (Ultratop Flanders)	17
Belgium (Ultratip Bubbling Under Wallonia)	4
France (SNEP)	32
Hungary (Stream Top 40)	11
UK Singles (Official Charts)	79
UK R&B/Hip-Hop (Official Charts)	12
US Bubbling Under R&B/Hip-Hop Singles (Billboard)	4

== Release history ==
Region	Date	Format	Label
Italy	October 24, 2014	Contemporary hit radio	Sony
Germany	December 5, 2014	CD single	Sony
