= Girl (Pharrell Williams album) =

Studio album by Pharrell Williams
- Released: March 3, 2014
- Studios: Chalice; Conway; Newman Scoring Stage (Los Angeles); CRC (Chicago); Circle House (Miami); Germano; Jungle City (New York City); Glenwood Place (Burbank); South Beach; The Studio at the Setai (Miami Beach); Studio at the Palms (Las Vegas); Studio Gang (Paris)
- Genres: Dance-pop; funk; neo soul; pop; R&B
- Length: 46:54
- Labels: I Am Other; Columbia
- Producer: Pharrell Williams

Pharrell Williams chronology
In My Mind (2006)	Girl (2014)	The Amazing Spider-Man 2: The Original Motion Picture Soundtrack (2014)

Singles from Girl
- 1. "Happy" Released: November 21, 2013; 2. "Marilyn Monroe" Released: March 10, 2014; 3. "Come Get It Bae" Released: May 20, 2014; 4. "Gust of Wind" Released: October 24, 2014; 5. "It Girl" Released: November 10, 2014

Girl (stylized as G I R L) is the second studio album by American musician Pharrell Williams. The album was released on March 3, 2014, by Williams' label I Am Other and Columbia Records. Girl was Williams' first studio album since his 2006 debut, In My Mind. It contains appearances by Justin Timberlake, Miley Cyrus, Daft Punk, JoJo, and Alicia Keys.

Girl received generally positive reviews from critics. It peaked at number one in 12 countries worldwide, also peaking in the top 10 of the charts of 17 other countries. The album has sold 591,000 copies in the United States as of February 2015. Its lead single was the Oscar-nominated "Happy" (from the Despicable Me 2 soundtrack), which was a huge worldwide success, becoming one of the best-selling singles of all time. Follow-up singles "Marilyn Monroe", "Come Get It Bae", and "Gust of Wind" have achieved moderate success. At the 57th Grammy Awards, the album was nominated for Album of the Year and won Best Urban Contemporary Album. "Happy" also won Best Pop Solo Performance and Best Music Video.

== Background ==
Williams provided vocals for French electronic duo Daft Punk's 2013 album Random Access Memories. After returning from the Paris recording sessions, he attended a meeting with record label managers, who said that the results were "spectacular" and that "Get Lucky" would be Daft Punk's next single. They also made Williams an offer to record his own album, to which he quickly agreed.

On December 17, 2013, it was announced that Williams had signed to Columbia Records and would release his second studio album in 2014. On February 18, 2014, Williams unveiled a trailer for the album.

== Concept ==
The work was described as a feminist "almost-concept" album in early reviews. Interviewed by Zane Lowe backstage at the 2014 Brit Awards, Williams specified that the capitalization and double-spacing of the album title is deliberately designed, "Because when you look at it, it looks a little weird... Because society is a little unbalanced." He added that he wished to honor the female figures in his life by making the record.

== Music and lyrics ==
The opening track on the album, "Marilyn Monroe", begins with an orchestral string introduction. The song's production is characterized by Williams' distinctive bass line. The album's first single, "Happy", is a neo soul and funk song that Williams sings in a falsetto tone.

"Come Get It Bae", which features uncredited guest vocals from Miley Cyrus, is a funk song with playful beat. Lyrically, the song is based around sex and the metaphor "You want to ride my motorcycle?" serving as a double entendre for sex.

== Singles ==
"Happy"
A sample of "Happy" by Pharrell Williams, the lead single from Girl.

"Marilyn Monroe"
A sample of "Marilyn Monroe" by Pharrell Williams, the second single from Girl.

"Happy" was first released on November 21, 2013, the song was originally written for and included on the Despicable Me 2 soundtrack. The song was reissued on December 16, 2013, as the album's lead single. On November 24, Williams released the first 24-hour music video for "Happy". Guest appearances included Magic Johnson, Steve Carell, Jimmy Kimmel, Jamie Foxx, Odd Future, Miranda Cosgrove, Janelle Monáe and many others. The song has been commercially successful, peaking at number one on the US Billboard Hot 100, topping charts in 19 other countries, and reaching top 10 positions in several more. It received a nomination for Best Original Song at the 86th Academy Awards, and Williams performed the song live at the ceremony on March 2, 2014.

In an interview with New York radio station Power 105.1, Williams revealed that the album's second single would be "Marilyn Monroe". On March 10, 2014, the single was added to the playlist of British urban contemporary radio station BBC Radio 1Xtra.

"Come Get It Bae" serves as the third single release from Girl and the second in the United States. It impacted rhythmic, urban contemporary and contemporary hit radio on May 20, 2014.

"Gust of Wind" was released to Italian contemporary hit radio on October 24, 2014, as the album's fourth single. "It Girl" was released to British contemporary hit radio on November 10, 2014, as the album's fifth single.

== Critical reception ==
Professional ratings
Aggregate scores
Source	Rating
AnyDecentMusic?	6.5/10
Metacritic	67/100
Review scores
Source	Rating
AllMusic	4/5 stars
The A.V. Club	B
Chicago Tribune	3/4 stars
Entertainment Weekly	B
The Guardian	4/5 stars
The Independent	3/5 stars
NME	8/10
Pitchfork	6.2/10
Rolling Stone	4/5 stars
Spin	8/10

Girl was met with generally positive reviews. At Metacritic, which assigns a normalized rating out of 100 to reviews from mainstream publications, the album received an average score of 67, based on 35 reviews. Aggregator AnyDecentMusic? gave it 6.5 out of 10, based on their assessment of the critical consensus.

Billboard magazine's Reggie Ugwu give the album four and a half stars out of five, and wrote that the album is "a relentlessly positive and unselfconsciously joyful tour de force." Andy Kellman of AllMusic felt that the "carefree soul throwback appears here, almost smack in the middle. It doesn't sound out of place in a set of upbeat, candy-coated pop-R&B that is relatively modern-sounding, laced with some elements of R&B from the mid- to late '60s and that sweet late-'70s to early-'80s spot." He gave the album four out of five stars.

Barry Walters of Spin gave the album an eight out of ten, saying "As suggested by its title, Pharrell's second solo album follows last year's monster smashes for Daft Punk and Robin Thicke with a full-length both unabashedly feminine and neatly spaced-out." Reed Jackson of XXL gave the album an XL rating, saying "Girl not only represents a proper representation of his creativity, but, with high-profile guest spots (Timberlake, Cyrus, Daft Punk) and a number of radio-ready singles, it should also be a success on the charts and further his reputation as a pop icon. Let the man's hot streak continue."

Eric Henderson of Slant Magazine gave the album three out of five stars, saying "As Williams tells it, the Despicable Me 2 team made him go through eight drafts before he arrived at the disarming, first-person charm of "Happy". Girl may have benefited from a few more introspective trips back to the drawing board." Robert Copsey of Digital Spy categorized the album's overall sound as "uplifting R&B-funk" and gave the album four out of five stars, saying "The Motown-funk sound that dominates most of Girl was always going to be a given after the success of "Get Lucky" and "Blurred Lines", but what is surprising is its lyrical content, which is celebratory of women's power and sexuality, unlike his Robin Thicke collaboration."

== Commercial performance ==
Girl debuted at number one on the UK Albums Chart on March 9, 2014. With first-week sales of over 70,000 copies, it was the fastest-selling album of 2014 in the UK at the time of its release, overtaking Bruce Springsteen's High Hopes by 45% and being certified silver. As of February 2015, Girl has sold 320,000 copies in the UK and been certified platinum.

In the United States, the album debuted at number two on the US Billboard 200, selling 113,000 copies. In its second week, the album dropped to number five on that chart, selling 45,000 more copies. In its third week, the album dropped to number six on that chart, selling 34,000 more copies. In its fourth week, the album rose to number five on that chart, selling 25,000 more copies. As of February 2015, the album has sold 591,000 copies in the United States.

== Track listing ==
All tracks written and produced by Pharrell Williams; co-writers are indicated. (Credits adapted from Tidal)

Girl track listing
No.	Title	Co-writer(s)	Length
1.	"Marilyn Monroe"	Ann Marie Calhoun; Hans Zimmer	5:51
2.	"Brand New" (duet with Justin Timberlake)		4:31
3.	"Hunter"		4:00
4.	"Gush"		3:54
5.	"Happy"		3:53
6.	"Come Get It Bae"		3:21
7.	"Gust of Wind"	Thomas Bangalter; Guy-Manuel de Homem-Christo; Zimmer	4:45
8.	"Lost Queen"		7:56
9.	"Know Who You Are" (duet with Alicia Keys)		3:56
10.	"It Girl"		4:49
Total length:			46:54

Japanese and digital reissue bonus track
No.	Title	Length
11.	"Smile"	3:46
Total length:		50:40

Notes

- "Marilyn Monroe" features additional spoken vocals by Kelly Osbourne
- "Brand New" features additional vocals by Rhea Dummett
- "Happy" features additional vocals by Rhea Dummett, Treveon Henderson, Terrance Rolle, Jasmine Murray, Ashley L. Lee and Shamika Hightower
- "Come Get It Bae" features additional vocals by Rhea Dummett, Miley Cyrus and Andrew Coleman
- "Gust of Wind" features additional vocals by Daft Punk
- "Lost Queen" is followed by the hidden track "Freq", which features uncredited vocals from JoJo

== Personnel ==
- Pharrell Williams – lead vocals, keyboards, synthesizers, programming, drums, percussion, production, guitar
- Hans Zimmer – strings arrangement
- Kelly Osbourne – background vocals ("Marilyn Monroe")
- Justin Timberlake – vocals ("Brand New")
- Timbaland – beatboxing ("Brand New")
- Miley Cyrus – vocals ("Come Get It Bae")
- Daft Punk – vocoder ("Gust of Wind")
- Francesco Yates – electric guitar ("Gust of Wind") (credited as Francesco)
- JoJo – vocals ("Freq")
- Alicia Keys – vocals ("Know Who You Are")
- Thomas Bangalter (Daft Punk) – vocals ("Gust of Wind")
- Guy-Manuel de Homem-Christo (Daft Punk) – vocals ("Gust of Wind")
- Tori Kelly – vocals ("Come Get It Bae")
- Leah LaBelle – vocals ("Freq")
- Reah Dummett – additional vocals
- Brent Paschke – guitar
- Andrew Coleman – arranger, digital editing, engineer, electric guitar
- Mike Larson – arranger, coordination, digital editing, engineer
- Adrian Breakspear – engineer
- Nick Valentin – assistant engineer
- Jimmy Douglass – mixing
- Leslie Brathwaite – mixing
- Bob Ludwig – mastering
- Beau Vallis – assistant engineer

== Charts ==
=== Weekly charts ===
Chart performance for Girl
Chart (2014)	Peak position
Australian Albums (ARIA)	1
Australian Urban Albums (ARIA)	33
Austrian Albums (Ö3 Austria)	4
Belgian Albums (Ultratop Flanders)	1
Belgian Albums (Ultratop Wallonia)	2
Canadian Albums (Billboard)	2
Croatian International Albums (HDU)	9
Czech Albums (ČNS IFPI)	4
Danish Albums (Hitlisten)	1
Dutch Albums (Album Top 100)	2
Finnish Albums (Suomen virallinen lista)	7
French Albums (SNEP)	1
German Albums (Offizielle Top 100)	2
Hungarian Albums (MAHASZ)	6
Irish Albums (IRMA)	3
Italian Albums (FIMI)	1
Japanese Albums (Oricon)	3
Japanese International Albums (Billboard Japan)	1
New Zealand Albums (RMNZ)	2
Norwegian Albums (VG-lista)	1
Polish Albums (ZPAV)	3
Portuguese Albums (AFP)	4
Scottish Albums (Official Charts)	1
South African Albums (RISA)	14
South Korean Albums (Gaon)	18
Spanish Albums (Promusicae)	6
Swedish Albums (Sverigetopplistan)	2
Swiss Albums (Schweizer Hitparade)	1
UK Albums (Official Charts)	1
UK R&B Albums (Official Charts)	1
US Billboard 200	2
US Top R&B/Hip-Hop Albums (Billboard)	1

=== Year-end charts ===
2014 year-end chart performance for Girl
Chart (2014)	Position
Australian Albums (ARIA)	18
Austrian Albums (Ö3 Austria)	69
Belgian Albums (Ultratop Flanders)	15
Belgian Albums (Ultratop Wallonia)	18
Canadian Albums (Billboard)	31
Dutch Albums (Album Top 100)	20
French Albums (SNEP)	19
German Albums (Offizielle Top 100)	54
New Zealand Albums (RMNZ)	28
Polish Albums (ZPAV)	47
Swedish Albums (Sverigetopplistan)	22
Swiss Albums (Schweizer Hitparade)	6
UK Albums (OCC)	15
US Billboard 200	26
US Top R&B/Hip-Hop Albums (Billboard)	4

2015 year-end chart performance for Girl
Chart (2015)	Position
French Albums (SNEP)	178
US Top R&B/Hip-Hop Albums (Billboard)	55

=== Decade-end charts ===
Decade-end chart performance for Girl
Chart (2010–2019)	Position
US Billboard 200	133

== Certifications and sales ==
Certifications for Girl
Region	Certification	Certified units/sales
Australia (ARIA)	Platinum	70,000^{^}
Canada (Music Canada)	2× Platinum	160,000^{‡}
Denmark (IFPI Danmark)	Platinum	20,000^{‡}
France (SNEP)	2× Platinum	203,600
Germany (BVMI)	Gold	100,000^{^}
Japan (RIAJ)	Gold	100,000^{^}
Netherlands (NVPI)	Gold	25,000^{^}
Poland (ZPAV)	Platinum	20,000^{*}
Sweden (GLF)	Gold	20,000^{‡}
Switzerland (IFPI Switzerland)	Gold	10,000^{^}
United Kingdom (BPI)	Platinum	320,000
United States (RIAA)	Gold	591,000
^{*} Sales figures based on certification alone.^{^} Shipments figures based on certification alone.^{‡} Sales+streaming figures based on certification alone.

== Release history ==
Release dates and formats for Girl
Region	Date	Format(s)	Label(s)	Ref.
Worldwide	March 3, 2014	Digital download; CD	I Am Other; Columbia	
