= Pharrell Williams =

American musician and songwriter (born 1973)

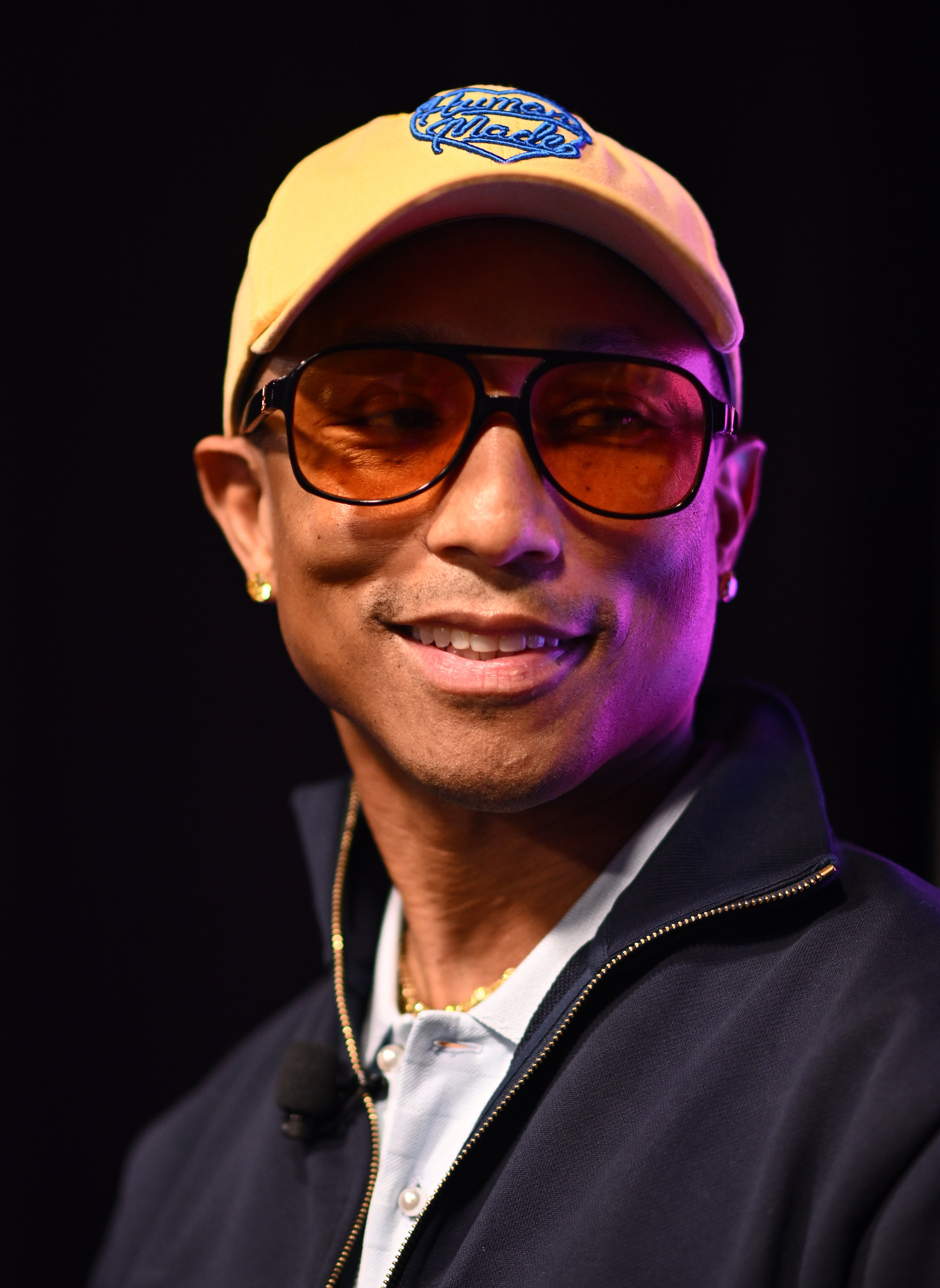
- Williams in 2024
- Born: Pharrell Lanscilo Williams; April 5, 1973 (age 53); Virginia Beach, Virginia, U.S.
- Other names: Pharrell; Skateboard P; Sk8brd; Auto Goon; Magnum, the Verb Lord; Station Wagon P; Yellow Lightning
- Education: Northwestern University (dropped out)
- Occupations: Musician; singer; songwriter; rapper; record producer; fashion designer
- Years active: 1992–present
- Works: Discography; co-production; solo production
- Spouse: Helen Lasichanh (m. 2013)
- Children: 4
- Relatives: Timbaland (cousin)
- Awards: Full list
- Musical career
- Genres: Hip-hop; R&B; pop; funk; rock
- Instruments: Vocals; keyboards; drums
- Labels: I Am Other; Columbia; Virgin; Arista; Interscope; Star Trak
- Formerly of: The Neptunes; N.E.R.D.; Child Rebel Soldier
- Website: pharrellwilliams.com

Pharrell Lanscilo Williams (/fəˈrɛl/ fə-REL; born April 5, 1973) is an American musician, singer, songwriter, record producer and fashion designer. He initially became known as one half of the music production duo the Neptunes, which he established with Chad Hugo in 1992. Fifteen of their productions have peaked within the top ten of the Billboard Hot 100, which includes four songs that peaked atop the chart. The two also formed the rock and hip-hop band N.E.R.D. with Shay Haley in 1999, for which Williams served as lead vocalist. He has been regarded as one of the most influential producers in modern popular music. He has also contributed music to all of the Despicable Me animated films.

Williams co-founded the record label Star Trak Entertainment with Hugo in 2001, as an imprint of Arista Records. Williams's 2003 debut single, "Frontin'" (featuring Jay-Z), peaked at number five on the Billboard Hot 100. He then signed with Virgin and Interscope Records to release his debut studio album, In My Mind (2006), which peaked at number three on the Billboard 200 despite mixed critical reception. Williams produced and guest performed alongside T.I. on Star Trak signee Robin Thicke's 2013 single "Blurred Lines", which peaked atop the Billboard Hot 100 and received diamond certification by the Recording Industry Association of America (RIAA). That same year, his guest appearance alongside Nile Rodgers on Daft Punk's single "Get Lucky" peaked at number two on the chart and won Record of the Year and Best Pop Duo/Group Performance at the 56th Annual Grammy Awards. Williams's 2013 single, "Happy"—released for the soundtrack to Despicable Me 2—became his second song to peak atop the chart that same year. It also served as lead single for his second album, Girl (2014), which peaked at number two on the Billboard 200 and saw positive critical reception.

Williams has received numerous accolades and nominations. He has won 14 Grammy Awards, including three for Producer of the Year, Non-Classical (one as a member of the Neptunes). He is also a two-time Academy Award nominee: in 2014 for Best Original Song for "Happy"; and in 2017 for Best Picture as a producer of Hidden Figures. As sole proprietor, he founded the multi-disciplinary media company I Am Other in 2012, which acts as both a record label and creative umbrella for his other endeavors, including his fashion label and retailer, Billionaire Boys Club. He has served as Men's creative director for Louis Vuitton since 2023.

== Early life ==
Williams was born on April 5, 1973, in Virginia Beach, Virginia, the eldest of the three sons of teacher Carolyn and handyman Pharoah Williams. His ancestry goes back many generations in Virginia and North Carolina. One of his ancestors journeyed to West Africa in 1831, prompting other relatives to emigrate from the U.S. to Liberia in 1832. Williams met Chad Hugo in a seventh-grade summer band camp, where Williams played drums and Hugo played tenor saxophone. They attended Princess Anne High School where they were in the school's band, the Fabulous Marching Cavaliers. Williams graduated from high school in 1991 and he attended Northwestern University for two years before dropping out.

== Career ==
=== 1992–2004: The Neptunes and N.E.R.D. ===
In the early 1990s, Williams formed a hip-hop group named Surrounded by Idiots with Chad Hugo, Magoo, and cousin Timbaland; they disbanded before making any records. He then formed a four-piece "R&B-type" group, the Neptunes, with Hugo and friends Shay Haley and Mike Etheridge. They entered a high school talent show, where they were discovered by producer Teddy Riley, whose studio was next to the school. After graduating, the group signed with Riley.

Williams wrote Riley's verse on Wreckx-n-Effect's 1992 hit "Rump Shaker". As the Neptunes, Williams and Hugo produced Noreaga's 1998 single "Superthug". The Neptunes began working with rap duo Clipse (rappers Pusha T and Malice) in the late 1990s, and worked on Clipse's album Exclusive Audio Footage, which was not released.

The Neptunes produced Mystikal's single "Shake Ya Ass" (2000), Jay-Z's single "I Just Wanna Love U (Give It 2 Me)" (2000), and Nelly's single "Hot in Herre" (2002). They worked with singer Kelis, producing her first two studio albums, Kaleidoscope (1999) and Wanderland (2001). In 2001, N.E.R.D., a band composed of Williams, Hugo, and Haley, released their debut album In Search of.... Williams and Hugo signed Clipse to Arista Records through Williams's Star Trak Entertainment imprint in 2001. The Neptunes produced songs on singer Babyface's 2001 album, Face2Face, including its lead single "There She Goes". The Neptunes produced the Britney Spears songs "I'm a Slave 4 U" and "Boys" for her third studio album, Britney (2001).

In 2002, Clipse released their debut album, Lord Willin', produced entirely by the Neptunes. That year, the Neptunes produced numerous songs on Justin Timberlake's debut album Justified, including the singles "Señorita", "Like I Love You", and "Rock Your Body". In 2003, the Neptunes released a compilation album, Clones. According to an unnamed August 2003 survey cited by The Age, it was found the Neptunes produced almost 20% of songs played on British radio at the time; another survey in the U.S. found they'd produced 43% of radio songs. The Neptunes produced Snoop Dogg's single "Drop It Like It's Hot" (2004), which also featured vocals from Williams.

=== 2005–2009: In My Mind and collaborations ===
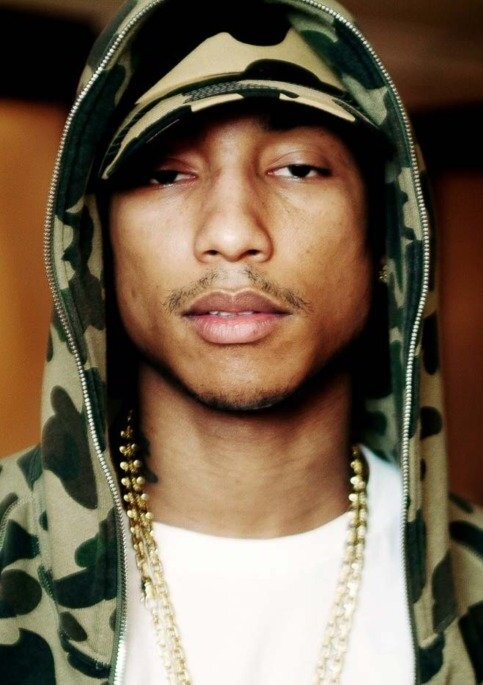
Williams in Berlin, March 2005

The Neptunes produced Gwen Stefani's single "Hollaback Girl", which entered the Billboard Hot 100 at number 82 on the issue dated April 2, 2005, and topped the chart within six weeks of its release. In 2006, Williams released his debut solo album, In My Mind. It debuted at number 3 on the U.S. Billboard 200. The Neptunes produced Clipse's second album, Hell Hath No Fury. The Neptunes produced several songs on Stefani's second album, The Sweet Escape (2006), including the promotional single, "Yummy", which features Williams. In December 2006, Williams was announced as a performer at Concert for Diana in Wembley Stadium, London on July 1, 2007. In 2007, the Neptunes produced on Jay-Z's tenth studio album, American Gangster.

Williams worked with Madonna for her eleventh studio album, Hard Candy (2008). In June 2008, an article in NME revealed that Williams was interested in producing the next album of American rock band the Strokes. Later that year, Williams worked on a remix album for Maroon 5, titled Call and Response: The Remix Album. N.E.R.D. released their third studio album, Seeing Sounds, in 2008.

Williams worked with Shakira on her songs "Did It Again", "Why Wait", "Good Stuff", and "Long Time" for her sixth studio album, She Wolf (2009). The following month, Williams made a guest appearance on French singer Uffie's debut album, which was released in early 2010. The Neptunes produced numerous songs on Clipse's third album, Til the Casket Drops (2009).

=== 2010–2014: Despicable Me, Despicable Me 2 and solo international success ===
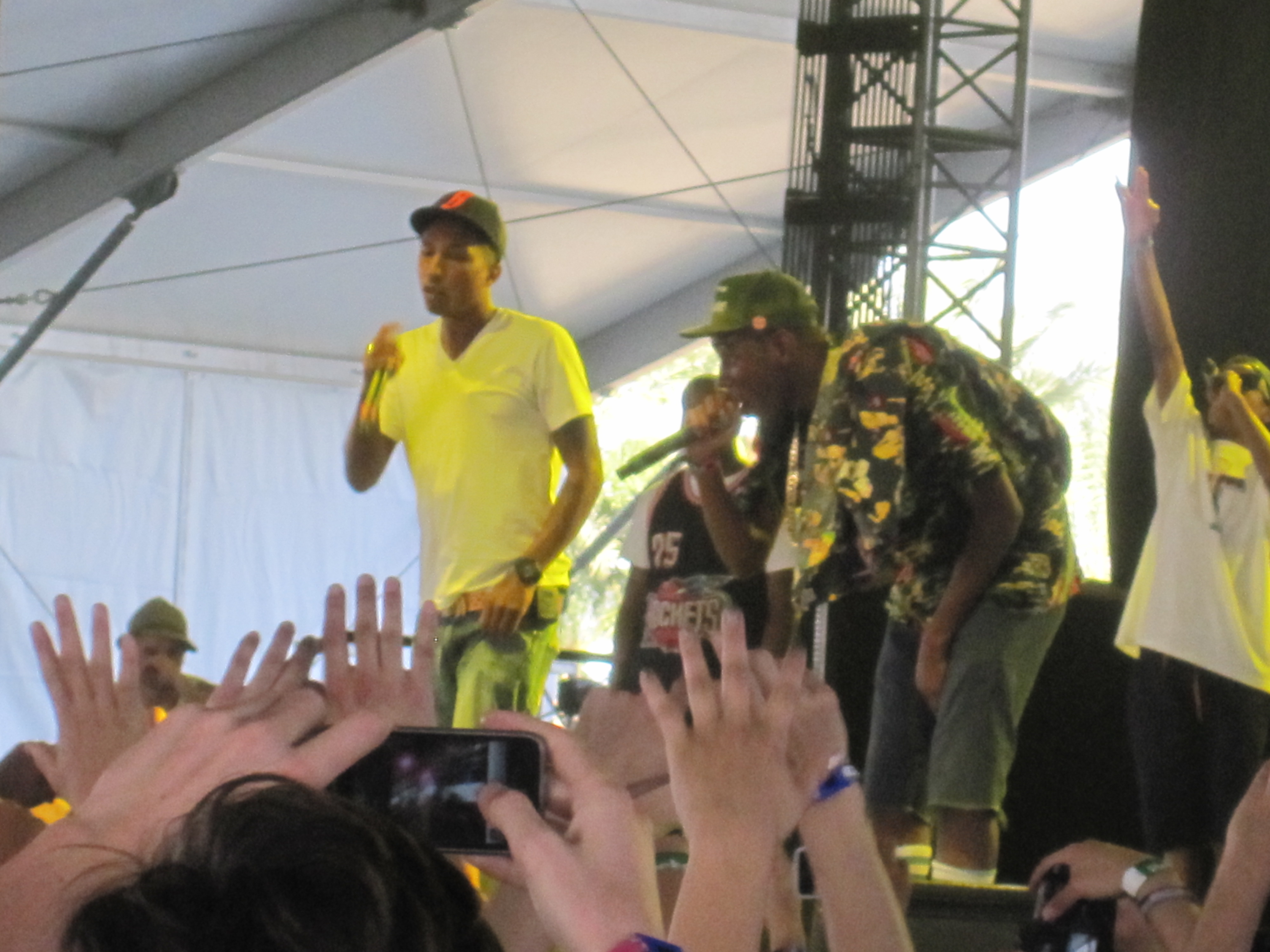
Williams, Odd Future and Tyler, the Creator performing together in April 2011

In 2010, Williams worked on the music score for the animated film Despicable Me with composers Hans Zimmer and Heitor Pereira. In 2010, N.E.R.D. released their fourth studio album, Nothing, through Star Trak. In late 2011, Williams worked on three tracks for Mike Posner's second album, Sky High. In 2012, Williams composed and produced the music for the 84th Academy Awards alongside Hans Zimmer.

In 2013, Williams collaborated with French electronic duo Daft Punk on the songs "Get Lucky" and "Lose Yourself to Dance", both included on Daft Punk's fourth studio album, Random Access Memories. "Get Lucky" peaked at number one on the UK Singles Chart and number two on the U.S. Billboard 200.

In 2013, Williams collaborated with Azealia Banks with the song "ATM Jam". The song was initially intended for Banks's debut studio album, Broke with Expensive Taste (2014), but was later removed from the album after Banks blamed Williams for the song's poor commercial performance. Williams penned three new original songs, included alongside composer Heitor Pereira's score, for the film Despicable Me 2 (2013). These were "Just a Cloud Away", "Happy", and "Scream" (featuring CeeLo Green). His two original songs from the first film, "Despicable Me" and "Fun, Fun, Fun", were also reprised on the Despicable Me 2 soundtrack. He also participated in the drummer sessions of the soundtrack of Man of Steel by Hans Zimmer. In March 2013, Robin Thicke's single "Blurred Lines", written and produced by Williams, was released. The song peaked at number one in multiple countries, including the United Kingdom and the United States. In mid-2013, Williams was involved in two songs that sold a million copies in the UK: "Get Lucky" and "Blurred Lines".

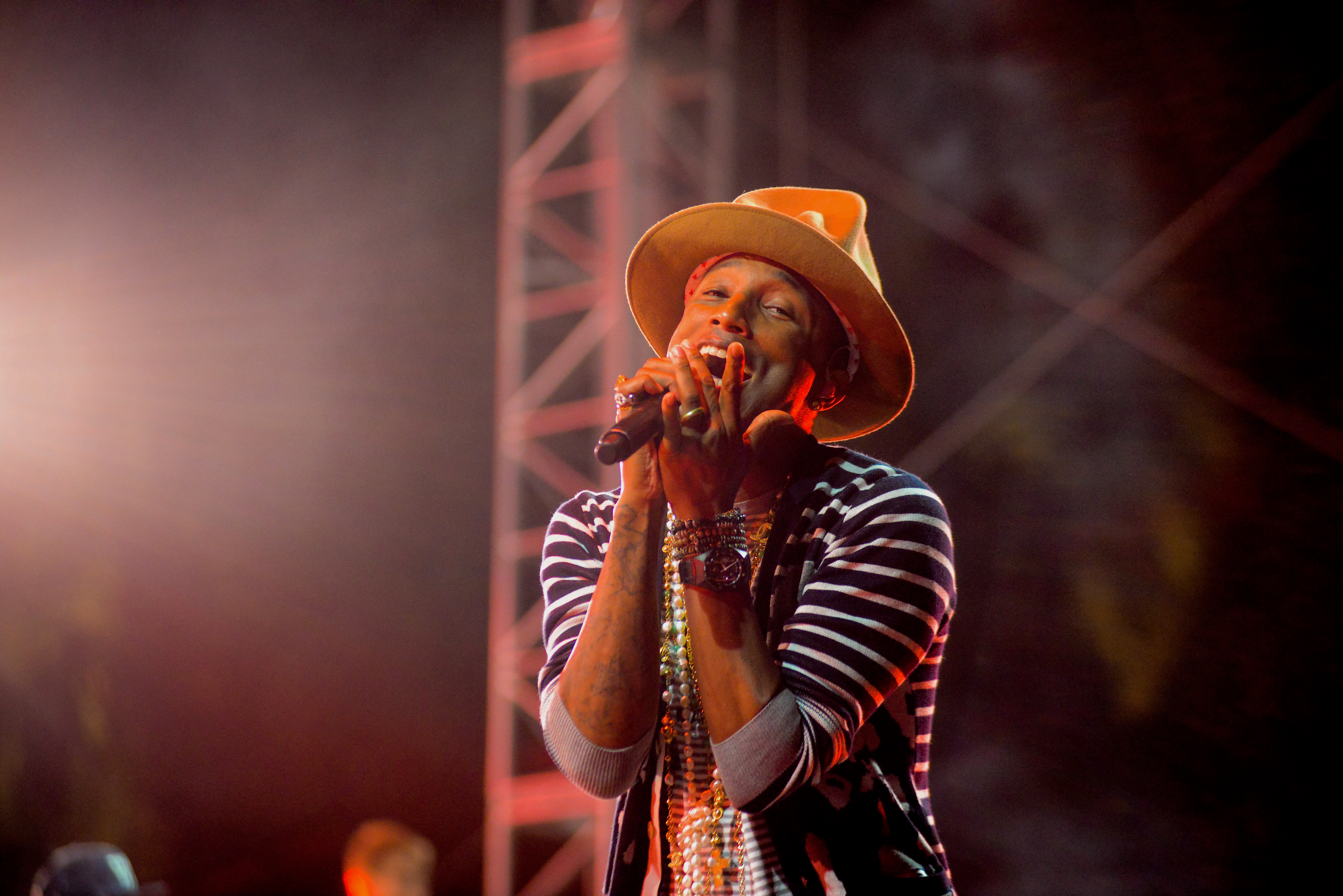
Williams performing at the 2014 Coachella Valley Music and Arts Festival

In August 2013, Busta Rhymes talked about an unreleased "documentary album" by Williams where he talks about "inner-city strife and hardship". In November 2013, Williams released the music video for "Happy"; guest appearances included Magic Johnson, Steve Carell, Jimmy Kimmel, Odd Future, among others. The video was billed by Williams as the "first 24-hour music video".On November 1, 2013, Williams performed with a gospel choir at Emanuel African Methodist Episcopal Church in Charleston, South Carolina, where nine black parishioners were shot and killed on June 17, 2015.

It was announced in December 2013 that Williams had been nominated for seven Grammy Awards, including Producer of the Year. In the same month, Williams signed a contract with Columbia Records, and announced an album set for release in 2014 that would feature "Happy". For "Happy", Williams was nominated for the Academy Award for Best Original Song. In February 2014, Major Lazer announced they would be releasing a five-track EP titled Apocalypse Soon on the 25th of that month. The EP, released via Mad Decent and Secretly Canadian, features Williams and Sean Paul, among others. The first single off the EP, which features Williams, is titled "Aerosol Can". Williams contributed a verse to Future's February 2014 single "Move That Dope", which also featured Pusha T and Casino over production from Mike Will Made It.

On February 18, 2014, Williams announced via Twitter that his second album, Girl, would be released on March 3, 2014. The album was supported by a European concert tour, Dear Girl Tour. At the 86th Academy Awards on March 2, 2014, Williams's song "Happy" lost to "Let It Go" from Frozen. Afterwards, when GQ magazine asked Williams "how badly" did he want the Oscar, he responded: "When they read the results, my face was...frozen. But then I thought about it, and I just decided just to...let it go". At the Oscar Awards that same year, he wore a controversial outfit consisting of a tuxedo with shorts. In May 2014, Williams received an Innovator Award at the iHeartRadio Music Awards.

(video) Williams introducing a N.E.R.D section of his live performance at Summer Sonic Festival in Japan, 2015

=== 2014–present: The Voice, Something in the Water and other ventures ===
In March 2014, it was announced that Comme des Garçons would be releasing a unisex fragrance with Williams, named after his album Girl. On March 31, 2014, Williams was announced as a new coach for the seventh season of The Voice, replacing CeeLo Green. In June 2014, it was announced that Williams would make a guest appearance on the docu-series Sisterhood of Hip Hop. Williams co-composed the score for The Amazing Spider-Man 2 (2014) with Hans Zimmer, Johnny Marr, Michael Einziger, and David A. Stewart. Williams was the executive producer of Atlanta rapper T.I.'s ninth studio album, Paperwork, which was released on October 21, 2014, by Grand Hustle and Columbia Records. In May 2014, Williams curated an art show named after his album, Girl, at the Galerie Perrotin in Paris, France. The show included artists Takashi Murakami, JR, Daniel Arsham, and Marina Abramović, among others. Williams collaborated with Gwen Stefani with the song "Shine" for the animated film Paddington (2014).

In January 2015, Williams was announced as the musical director for a 7-continent Live Earth concert on June 18, 2015, to raise awareness about and pressure governments to act on climate change. On February 8, 2015, Williams made a cameo in an episode of The Simpsons entitled "Walking Big & Tall" where he comes to Springfield to write a new anthem for the town. Williams recorded three songs for the soundtrack to the 2015 animated film The SpongeBob Movie: Sponge Out of Water. On May 18, 2015, Team Pharrell had 16-year-old Sawyer Fredericks win the eighth season of The Voice.

At the 2015 Grammy Awards, Williams performed an orchestral rendition of "Happy" with Hans Zimmer and pianist Lang Lang that included a tribute to the Black Lives Matter movement, inspired by Eric Garner's death and the Ferguson unrest. In 2015, a unanimous jury determined that "Blurred Lines", which Williams co-wrote and produced, was an infringement of the 1977 Marvin Gaye song "Got to Give It Up". The jury awarded the Gaye family $7.4 million in damages for the copyright infringement based on profits generated. In October 2015, the Tisch School of the Arts at New York University named Williams as their artist-in-residence. He gave the 2017 commencement address at the university and received an honorary Doctor of Fine Arts degree on May 17, 2017. In 2018, Williams worked with Ariana Grande for her fourth studio album, Sweetener (2018). He produced several songs on the album, and is featured on the song "Blazed".

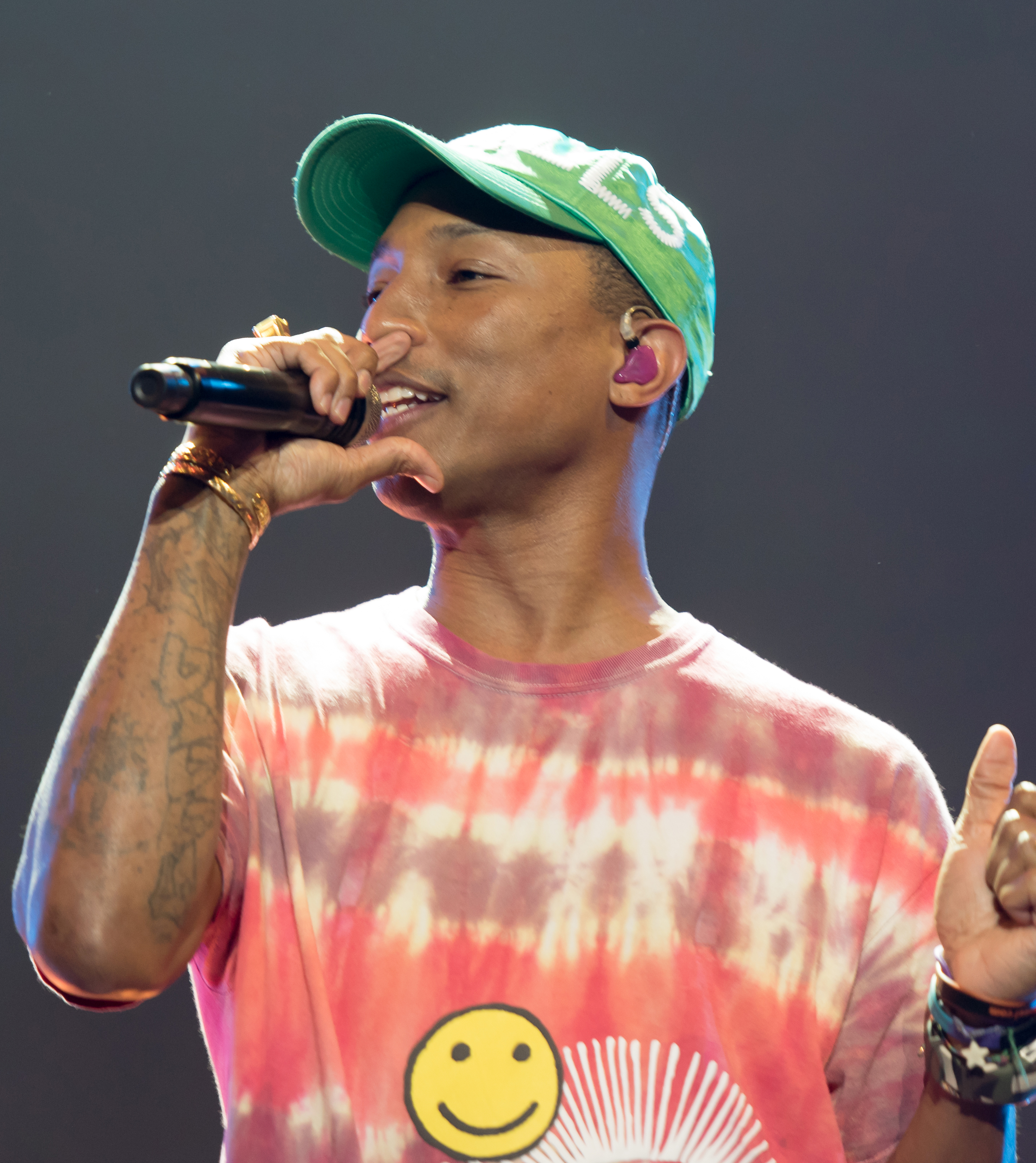
Williams at the Global Citizen Festival in Hamburg, July 2017

In March 2019, Williams and the city of Virginia Beach announced the launch of a three-day music and cultural festival titled Something in the Water, to be held during College Beach Weekend, April 26–28, on the Virginia Beach Oceanfront. The festival lineup included Travis Scott, Migos, Janelle Monáe, SZA, Rosalía, Anderson .Paak, Jhené Aiko, Mac DeMarco, Maggie Rogers, Lil Uzi Vert, Missy Elliott, Pusha T, Dave Matthews Band, and DRAM. The first day of the festival was cancelled due to severe storms. The "Pharrell and Friends" set that closed the festival's second day, featured Williams and a lineup of guests, including Jay-Z, Diddy, Busta Rhymes, Usher, Snoop Dogg, Missy Elliott, Timbaland, Charlie Wilson, and Tyler, the Creator. The festival's final day featured Trey Songz, Chris Brown, Lil Duval, and members of SWV and Blackstreet. Williams produced five songs for Walt Disney Pictures's The Lion King (2019), marking his third collaboration with composer Hans Zimmer. In October 2019, Williams stated that he regretted the 2013 song "Blurred Lines", which received intense backlash for its apparent sexist themes.

Williams's life and career is the subject of Piece by Piece, an animated documentary film released in theaters in October 2024 and created using Lego animation.

A film loosely based on Williams's life, Golden was filmed by Michel Gondry and set for release on May 9, 2025. However, the film was canceled by Universal in February 2025 prior to the film entering post-production due to a disagreement with Williams and other producers. The film is permanently shelved and will not be offered to other studios. Williams was the sole and executive producer for Clipse July 2025 album Let God Sort Em Out, and also appeared on the album as a guest. Williams featured on the track "Big Poe" off of Tyler, The Creator's 2025 album Don't Tap the Glass. Williams received the Dr. Dre Global Impact Award at the 68th Annual Grammy Awards on February 1, 2026. He produced Future's "Alice", Lil Baby's "Dead Fresh", Quavo's "Haavin", and T.I.'s "Let 'Em Know" in 2026.

== Artistry ==
=== Influences ===
In the past, Williams has stated that he does not have any direct musical influences, but he has expressed his admiration for several musicians, including Michael Jackson, J Dilla, Stevie Wonder, Donny Hathaway, Marvin Gaye, Rakim, and Q-Tip. Williams explained that A Tribe Called Quest's debut album, People's Instinctive Travels and the Paths of Rhythm (1990), caused a "turning point" in his life, which "made him see that music was art".

Williams has also referenced his synesthesia as contributing to his art and his enjoyment of music from a young age.

=== Four-count start ===
Throughout his career, Williams has been known for his "four-count loops" or "four-count starts" at the start of the beats that he produced, which is considered as a producer signature. Williams revealed in a 2019 interview with Vulture that the creation of the four-count loop was unintentional, and the loop was essentially what was left in the song while trying to start a song on the beat instead of using a metronome.

== Fashion and business ventures ==
In 2005, Williams partnered with Japanese fashion icon Nigo to create the streetwear brands Billionaire Boys Club and Ice Cream footwear. In 2008, Williams co-designed a series of eyewear and jewelry for Louis Vuitton. In 2008, Williams founded a non-profit organization called "From One Hand To AnOTHER" (FOHTA). In 2009, Williams unveiled a collaborative sculpture with Takashi Murakami at Art Basel, which spoke to the metaphor of value. In May 2011, it was announced that Williams would serve as creative director of KarmaloopTV alongside founder and CEO Greg Selkoe and former AMC president Katie McEnroe.

In May 2012, Williams launched the social media venture I Am Other. In August 2013, Williams created a line of sunglasses for fashion brand Moncler called "Moncler Lunettes". In 2014, Williams entered a long-term partnership with Adidas. His Adidas NMD "Human Race" collection was released on July 23, 2016. In February 2014, Williams announced a collaboration between G-Star Raw and his textile company Bionic Yarn called "RAW for the Oceans," a collection of denim made from recycled plastic that is found in the ocean. The project was presented at the American Museum of Natural History in New York City.

In 2014, Williams appeared on a cover designed by French artist Grégoire Guillemin of New York-based men fashion magazine Adon, covering the collaboration. Williams released a collection for retail giant Uniqlo in April 2014 entitled "i am OTHER". It was created with Nigo, creative director of UT, the company's T-shirt division. In 2014, Williams worked on art with Emmanuel Perrotin and a French manufacturer, Domeau & Pérès. In June 2014, artist collective Rizzoli published a book by FriendsWithYou, We Are Friends With You, that featured contributions from Williams, Alejandro Jodorowsky, and Peter Doroshenko. Williams was the executive producer of the 2015 crime comedy-drama film Dope.

In 2017, Williams designed a €1,000 sneaker in collaboration with Chanel and Adidas. In November 2018, Williams performed at a Friends of the Israel Defense Forces Gala, which raised a record high of $60 million. He also spoke about the Pittsburgh synagogue shooting, stating "what happened in that synagogue was incredibly cruel, it was wrong, and it's not supposed to be what our nation is... this group of people have been tested over and over and over again ... but you guys show an incredible resilience." Williams was criticized for singing "Happy" on social media, with critics citing the IDF as having killed over 200 Palestinians in 2018, calling the song contrary to the actions of the military.

Verizon partnered with Williams on April 26, 2019, to launch a tech-fused music curriculum in a nationwide Verizon Foundation Learning schools. The education organization under Verizon Foundation works toward providing free technology, internet access, technology-focused curriculum to under-resourced middle schools. In November 2020, Williams launched Humanrace, a skin care brand. In December 2021, Williams would launch the winter line "Premium basics" together with Adidas Originals.

In June 2022, Doodles announced Williams as its Chief Brand Officer. Additionally, Doodles have set a release date for Williams to release a Doodles album that will be available to stream in addition to be sold exclusively as NFTs.

On February 14, 2023, Louis Vuitton announced that Williams had been appointed their new men's creative director, a position left vacant by the death of Virgil Abloh in 2021. Williams displayed his first collection during Paris Men's Fashion Week in June 2023.

== Personal life ==
Williams married his longtime partner, model and fashion designer Helen Lasichanh, on October 12, 2013. The couple has four children together: son Rocket (b. 2008) and triplets (b. January 2017). The Despicable Me song "Rocket's Theme" was written in honor of their son Rocket.

In 2005, Williams was voted "Best Dressed Man in the World" by Esquire. He is a fan of the science fiction series Star Trek, as indicated by his consistent use of the Vulcan salute to signify his label name, Star Trak. Williams is a skateboarder and has a half-pipe inside his home. In 2011, Williams announced his charitable foundation, From One Hand to Another, would be funding a $35 million after-school center in his home town, Virginia Beach. In 2019, Williams offered internships to 144 students at Promise Academy in Harlem, New York City.

On March 26, 2021, Williams's cousin Donovan Lynch was shot and killed by an officer from the Virginia Beach Police Department after "brandishing a handgun" following three shootings in the area. Williams has called for a federal investigation into the incident.

In December 2025, the Financial Times reported that Williams had paid one of the highest prices for a Paris property in that year, paying around €62.5 million.

== Discography ==
=== Solo albums ===
- In My Mind (2006)
- Girl (2014)

=== Mixtapes ===
- In My Mind: The Prequel (with DJ Drama, 2006)
- The Billionaire Boys Club Tape (2012)
- Black Yacht Rock Vol. 1, City of Limitless Access (2024)

=== Collaboration albums ===
With N.E.R.D.

- In Search of... (2002)
- Fly or Die (2004)
- Seeing Sounds (2008)
- Nothing (2010)
- No One Ever Really Dies (2017)

With the Neptunes

- Clones (2003)

== Filmography ==
- Despicable Me (2010) – Composer
- Get Him to the Greek (2010) – Himself
- Despicable Me 2 (2013) – Composer
- The Voice (2014–16) – Himself
- The Amazing Spider-Man 2 (2014) – Co-composer, part of The Magnificent Six
- The Simpsons (2015) – Himself (Episode: "Walking Big & Tall") (voice role)
- Pitch Perfect 2 (2015) – Himself
- Popstar: Never Stop Never Stopping (2016) – Himself
- Hidden Figures (2016) – Producer, composer
- Despicable Me 3 (2017) – Composer
- The Grinch (2018) – Narrator (voice role)
- Black Is King (2020) – Special appearance
- North Hollywood (2020) – Producer
- A Man Named Scott (2021) – Himself
- Sing 2 (2021) – Alfonso (voice role)
- Despicable Me 4 (2024) – Composer
- Piece by Piece (2024) – Himself (voice role); producer, composer
- Mufasa: The Lion King (2024) – Composer
- Golden (2025) – Producer, composer (film was canceled prior to post-production by Universal Studios)
- In Whose Name? (2025) – Himself

== Tours ==
- Dear Girl Tour (2014)

== Videography ==
Year	Title	Director	Ref.
2015	Freedom	Paul Hunter	
2024	Piece by Piece	Morgan Neville	

== Honors ==
(Knight of the National Order of the Legion of Honour (Chevalier de l'Ordre national de la Légion d'honneur), 2025)

On July 11, 2025, the France's Ministry for Europe and Foreign Affairs appointed Williams to the rank of Knight of the National Order of the Legion of Honour, highlighting his 31 years of service as a singer-songwriter, producer, and creative director of a ready-to-wear collection.

== See also ==
- Pharrell Williams v. Bridgeport Music
- List of people with synesthesia
