= Adam Levine =

American singer (born 1979)

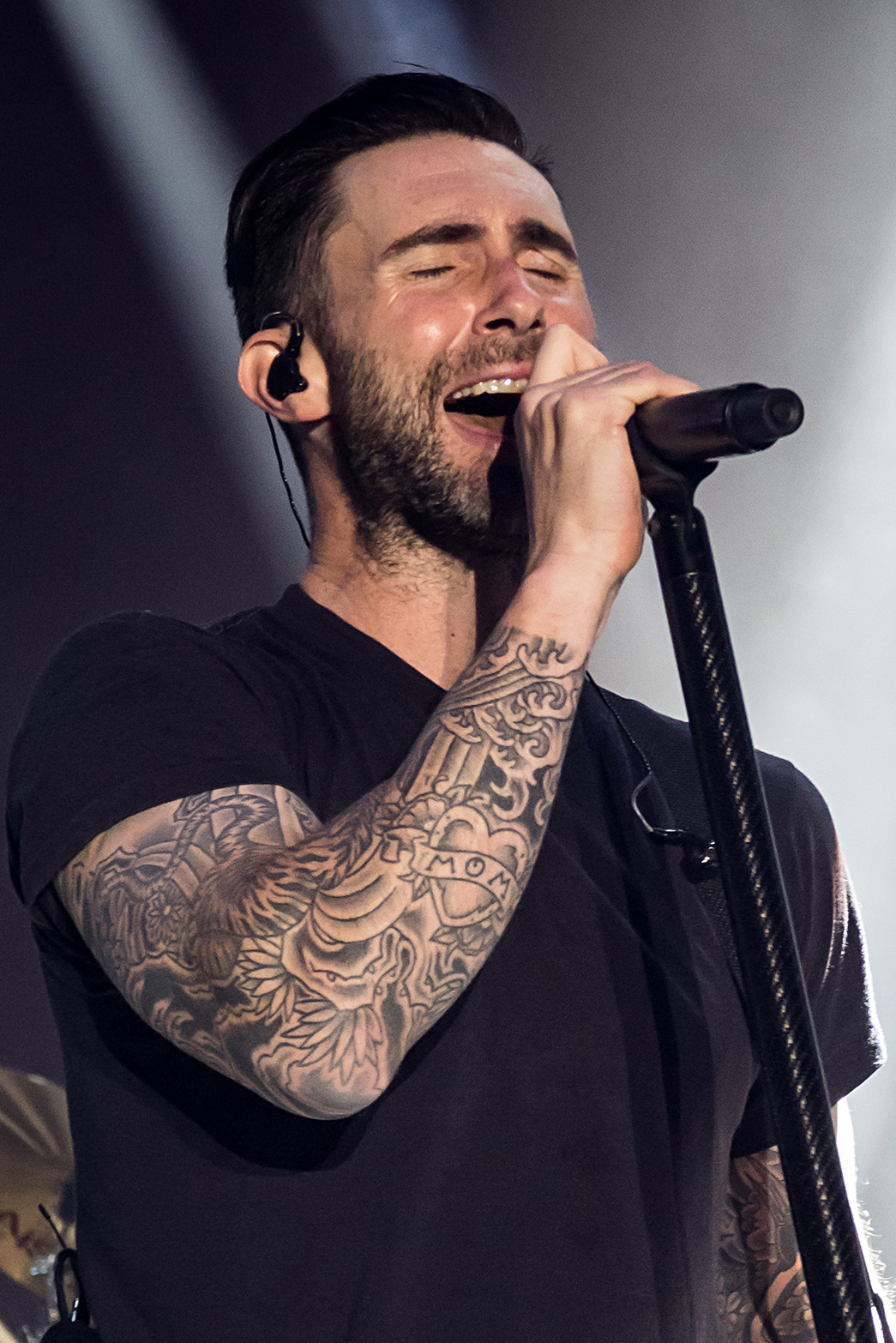
- Levine in 2016
- Born: Adam Noah Levine; March 18, 1979 (age 47); Los Angeles, California, U.S.
- Occupations: Singer; musician; songwriter; television personality
- Years active: 1994–present
- Spouse: Behati Prinsloo (m. 2014)
- Children: 3
- Relatives: Timothy Noah (uncle); Peter Noah (uncle)
- Awards: Full list
- Musical career
- Genres: Pop; pop rock; funk rock; blue-eyed soul; power pop
- Instruments: Vocals; guitar; keyboards
- Labels: J; A&M Octone; Interscope; 222; Reprise
- Member of: Maroon 5

Signature
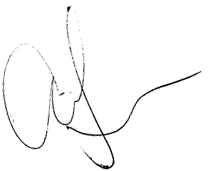

Adam Noah Levine (/ləˈviːn/ lə-VEEN; born March 18, 1979) is an American singer, songwriter, musician and television personality who is the lead singer, rhythm guitarist and sole continuous member of the pop rock band Maroon 5.

Levine began his musical pursuits in 1994, as a teenager, with the band Kara's Flowers, for which he served as lead vocalist and lead guitarist. Three years in they released their only album, The Fourth World, which was a commercial failure. The group was reformed in 2001 as Maroon 5 – with James Valentine replacing him as lead guitarist. In 2002, Maroon 5 released their first album, Songs About Jane, which went multi-platinum in the US; since then, they have released seven more albums: It Won't Be Soon Before Long (2007), Hands All Over (2010), Overexposed (2012), V (pronounced: "five"; 2014), Red Pill Blues (2017), Jordi (2021), and Love Is Like (2025). As part of Maroon 5, Levine has received multiple accolades, including three Grammy Awards. As a solo artist, he achieved concurrent commercial success with his guest appearance on Gym Class Heroes' 2011 single "Stereo Hearts", which peaked within the top five of the Billboard Hot 100.

From 2011 to 2019, and again in 2025 and 2026, Levine has been featured for nineteen seasons as a coach on NBC's reality talent show The Voice. The winners of multiple seasons (1, 5, 9, and 29) belonged to his team. In 2012, Levine made his acting debut as the recurring character Leo Morrison in the second season of the television series American Horror Story. He also appeared in the films Begin Again (2013), Popstar: Never Stop Never Stopping (2016), Fun Mom Dinner and The Clapper (both 2017). Levine launched his eponymous fragrance line in 2013. The same year, he collaborated with Kmart and ShopYourWay.com to develop his menswear collection. He also owns a record label, 222 Records, and a production company, 222 Productions, which produced television shows Sugar and Songland. In 2013, The Hollywood Reporter reported that "sources familiar with his many business dealings" estimated Levine would earn more than $35 million that year.

== Early life ==
Adam Noah Levine was born on March 18, 1979, in Los Angeles to Fredric Levine, the founder of retail chain M. Fredric, and Patsy (née Noah) Levine, an admissions counselor. They divorced when he was seven and Levine underwent therapy. Growing up, he spent weekdays with his mother and weekends with his father. He has a younger brother. Levine's father and maternal grandfather were Jewish, while his maternal grandmother was a Protestant. Levine is Jewish; however, according to The Jewish Chronicle, he is spiritual but not religious. He chose not to have a bar mitzvah as a child because of the custom of receiving bar mitzvah gifts, explaining: "I felt as though a lot of kids were trying to cash in ... I just don't think it's the most respectful way to deal with God and beliefs and years and years and years of cultural heritage." Levine is a nephew of journalist and author Timothy Noah, and television producer and writer Peter Noah.

Levine describes his family as "very musical" and credits his mother with "start[ing] me out on the path." He also attributes his mother's idols – Simon & Garfunkel, Fleetwood Mac, and The Beatles – to shaping his musical style, calling them "a huge part of my upbringing". Levine attended Brentwood School, where he met Jesse Carmichael and Mickey Madden, his future bandmates. He carried his musical interests to high school, where he states he was "a little rebellious. I didn't want to do the things they were teaching me ... [music] consumed my every thought."

== Bands ==
=== Kara's Flowers ===
In February 1994, Levine, along with friends Jesse Carmichael, Mickey Madden, and Ryan Dusick formed garage band Kara's Flowers. In 1995, the group played their first gig at the Whisky a Go Go, a nightclub in West Hollywood, California, with Levine performing vocals and guitar. The band was discovered while they were performing in Malibu by independent producer Tommy Allen, who along with his partner John DeNicola, had them record an 11-track album. Owing to a string of industry showcases in Los Angeles, they were signed on to Reprise Records through producer Rob Cavallo.

In August 1997, the band released their first album, titled The Fourth World and also appeared on an episode of the drama series Beverly Hills, 90210. Despite high expectations, it had little success, selling about 5,000 copies. Reprise decided to drop the band after Cavallo's exit from the label. Disappointed with the results of their album, the band broke up. Later, Levine would say of the experience: "Kara's Flowers was just floating up the wall beneath the sticks. Make a record quickly, put it out. No touring base, no nothing. Just try to make it happen right out of the gate and it just doesn't work".

=== Maroon 5 ===
After the break up of Kara's Flowers, Levine, along with Carmichael, left Los Angeles to pursue higher studies at Five Towns College in New York. On MTV News, in 2002, he said: "That's when I started waking up to the whole hip-hop, R&B thing. We had friends named Chaos and Shit. It was not Brentwood High". They dropped out after a semester, and reunited with Madden and Dusick to form a band once more. They experimented with several styles, including country and folk, before deciding groove-based music would become their genre. Levine explained the need for a makeover for the band: "We were just so sick of being a typical rock 'n' roll band ... I felt like I needed to look elsewhere for vocal inspiration." The band put together a demo that was rejected by several labels, before it caught the attention of Octone Records executives James Diener, Ben Berkman, and David Boxenbaum. Following Berkman's advice, the band added a fifth member, James Valentine, and was renamed Maroon 5. In an interview with HitQuarters, Berkman explained that Levine "seemed to be a very shy, shoe-gazing type ... a fifth member could play the guitar to free up the singer [Levine], so he could be the star I perceived him to be".

Around this time, Levine had been working as a writer's assistant on the CBS television show Judging Amy; the program's producer Barbara Hall was his family friend. While on the show, he would spend time writing songs about his ex-girlfriend. These songs were put into Maroon 5's debut album Songs About Jane, which was released in June 2002. The album slowly gained airplay, and eventually became a sleeper hit, selling an estimated 10 million copies and becoming the tenth best-selling album of 2004, two years after its release. In 2005, Maroon 5 won their first Grammy Award, for Best New Artist. The next year, they won the Grammy Award for Best Pop Performance by a Duo or Group with Vocals for the second Songs About Jane single "This Love".

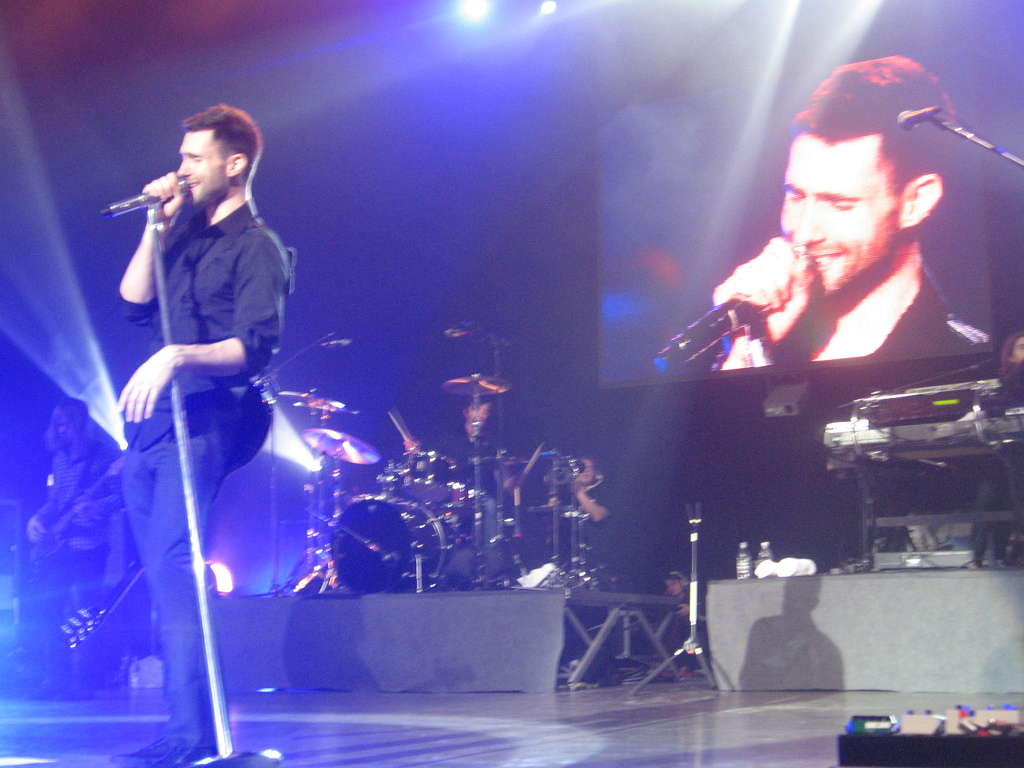
Levine performing with Maroon 5 in 2007

By 2006, the band began recording again, and in May 2007, Maroon 5's second album It Won't Be Soon Before Long was released. Levine described the album as "a vast improvement", explaining: "I think this record is a little more self-confident and powerful lyrically". To support the album, the band performed on a ten-date club tour which visited small venues in Europe and the United States from April to June 2007. The album and its lead, third and penultimate singles ("Makes Me Wonder", "Won't Go Home Without You" and "If I Never See Your Face Again", respectively) each received Grammy nominations, although only "Makes Me Wonder" secured a win.

After winding down from a world tour in support of It Won't Be Soon Before Long, the band began recording in Switzerland in 2009, in collaboration with record producer and songwriter Robert John "Mutt" Lange. Levine said Lange "worked me harder than anyone ever has". In 2010, Maroon 5 released their third studio album, Hands All Over. The album did not initially meet expectations. In an interview with Los Angeles Times, Levine explained that the album suffered from being "all these disparate ideas and songs that didn't make any sense together". After the moderate success of the album's first three singles, the band released "Moves like Jagger" (featuring Christina Aguilera) which Levine classified as "one of those songs that was definitely a risk; it's a bold statement". The single became a worldwide success; it was the ninth-best-selling digital single of 2011 with sales of 8.5 million copies and, as of 2012, the eighth-best-selling digital single of all time. Levine later credited the song with "totally reviving the band".

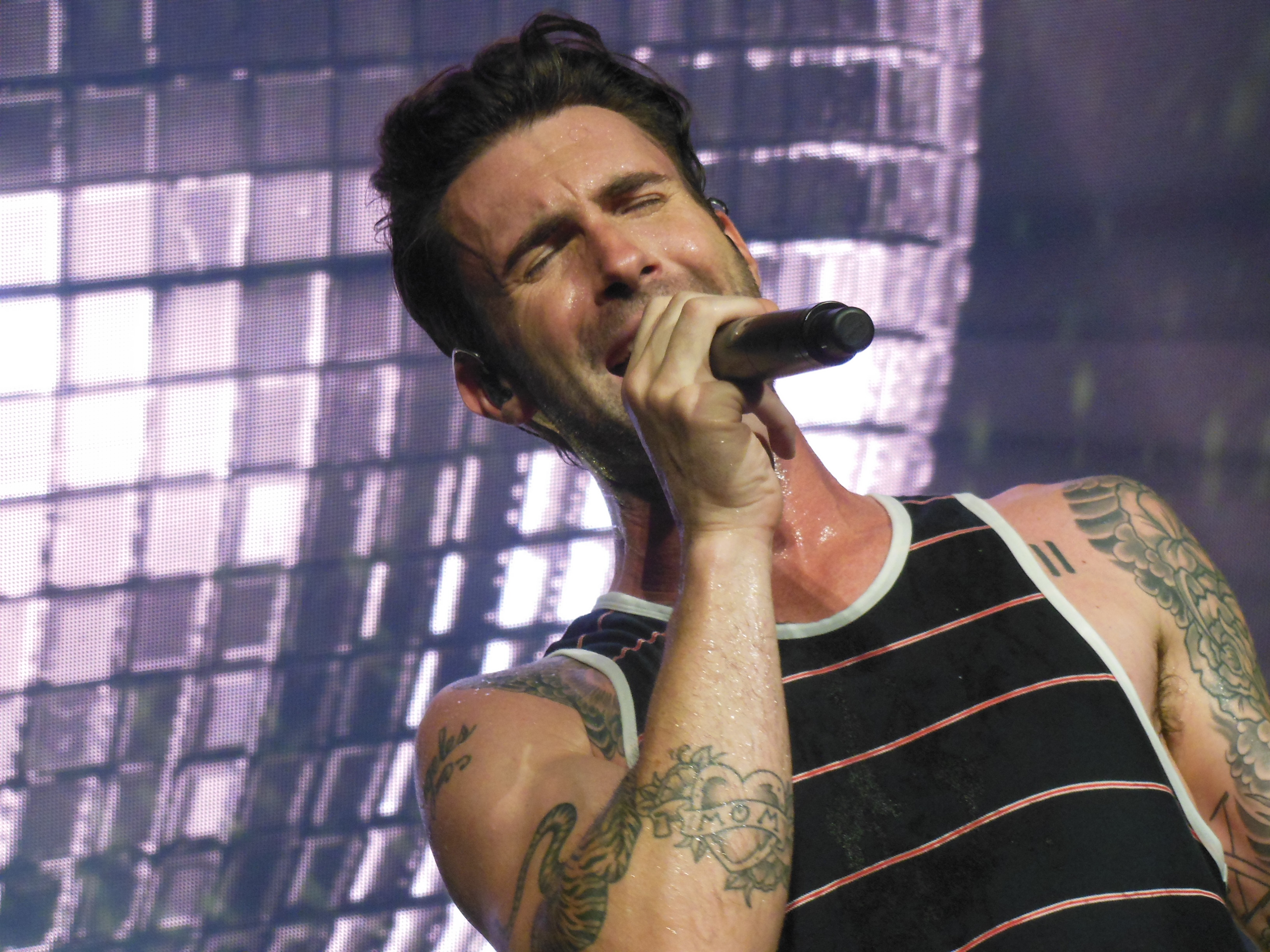
Levine performing at the opening night of the Honda Civic Tour 2013

Since "Moves Like Jagger" was the first time Maroon 5 had collaborated with an outside writer, the band decided to attempt it again on their next album, entitled Overexposed. Its title is supposedly an allusion to Levine's public ubiquity. In an interview with Rolling Stone, he opined that is their most dance-driven album ever, commenting: "It's very much an old-fashioned disco tune. I have a love/hate relationship with it – but mostly I love it". The album and its lead single "Payphone" gave Maroon 5 their second Grammy Award for Best Pop Vocal Album and Best Pop Duo/Group Performance nominations. In support of Overexposed, the band conducted the Overexposed Tour from 2012 to 2013 (with the European leg extending to 2014 due to scheduling conflicts), and also headlined the 2013 Honda Civic Tour, which included The Voice contestant Tony Lucca.

In 2014, Maroon 5 continued their collaboration with Ryan Tedder, Max Martin and others to release their fifth studio album V (pronounced: "five"). Levine acknowledged that they followed the same song-writing process that they tried with Overexposed, saying: "We developed a really nice system on the last record — we found songs we were passionate about, developed them and put our stamp on them ... this time we kept it going but looked for different types of songs." Five singles were released from it. In support of the album, the band undertook the Maroon V Tour, which kicked off with a show in Dallas in February 2015.

In 2007, Levine had stated that he believed Maroon 5 was reaching its peak and might make one more album before disbanding. He was quoted explaining: "Eventually I want to focus on being a completely different person because I don't know if I want to do this into my 40s and 50s and beyond". But in 2010, he dispelled any rumors of the band breaking up, saying:"I love what I do and think that, yes, it might be tiring and complicated at times [but] we don't have any plans on disbanding any time soon". He has also turned down the idea of having a solo career, stating that "there will never be a solo record. I would sooner have another band". On February 10, 2017, Levine received a star on the Hollywood Walk of Fame for his contributions to the recording industry.

== Other activities ==
=== Musical collaborations ===
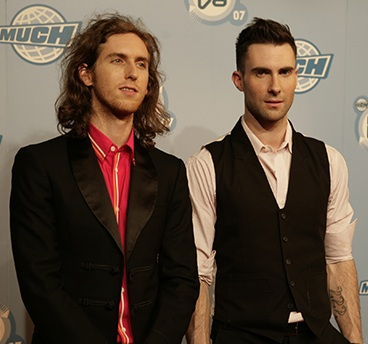
Levine (right) with bandmate Jesse Carmichael in 2007

Levine has collaborated with several musical artists. In 2005, he was featured on the song "Live Again" by hip-hop duo Ying Yang Twins. The same year, he appeared on Kanye West's album Late Registration, on the third single "Heard 'Em Say", a collaboration Levine called "very pure and very easy". The song was created during an airplane flight that he and West shared, and its refrain was later used for the Maroon 5 song "Nothing Lasts Forever" from It Won't Be Soon Before Long. He also appeared on Alicia Keys' third album Alicia Keys: MTV Unplugged, as part of the cover of The Rolling Stones song "Wild Horses". Around the same time, he featured on fellow Octone Records singer K'naan's single "Bang Bang".

In 2009, he recorded "Gotten", a song for Slash's first solo album Slash (2010). In February 2010, he was among approximately 80 musicians who sang on the charity-single remake of "We Are the World", called "We Are the World 25 for Haiti". In 2011, he appeared on the Gym Class Heroes song, "Stereo Hearts". Levine also worked with hip-hop artist 50 Cent on his song "My Life", recording the vocals almost two years before it was released as a single in 2012, which included rapper Eminem. In 2013, Levine wrote a song called "My Most Terrible Secret" performed by the cast of Community, in the episode "Intro to Felt Surrogacy".

In 2015, Levine was featured on the song "Painkiller" by Rozzi Crane and the duo, R. City's single "Locked Away". In 2016, Levine collaborated with The Lonely Island for the song "I'm So Humble", on the soundtrack album Popstar: Never Stop Never Stopping, which they also appeared in the film of the same name. In April 2019, Levine and 29 other musical acts were featured on the charity single "Earth", which raises climate change awareness. In late 2019, Levine collaborated with American actor and musician Joe Pesci, on his third album Pesci... Still Singing, with two songs "Baby Girl" and a cover of Stevie Wonder's "My Cherie Amour".

In 2020, Levine was featured on two songs "Trust Nobody", with rapper Lil Wayne on his album Funeral and "Same Guy" by Jack Harlow on the album Thats What They All Say. Levine is also featured as a singer for his band's song "She Will Be Loved" in the music rhythm game, Band Hero. Levine has contributed with two songs for the soundtracks of the John Carney films: "Lost Stars" in Begin Again and "Go Now" in Sing Street.

=== Television, film and media ===
Levine has made four notable comic appearances on television. During 2007, he appeared in the 33rd-season premiere of Saturday Night Live in an SNL Digital Short called Iran So Far, performing with Andy Samberg, Fred Armisen and Jake Gyllenhaal. Levine played himself while singing a humorous bridge to a "love song" for Mahmoud Ahmadinejad. In 2008, he performed on Comedy Central's "Night of Too Many Stars". He also had a cameo on Jimmy Kimmel Live! for the night of stars and endorsed Barack Obama in the 2008 Presidential Election. In 2013, he hosted Saturday Night Live and featured alongside Kendrick Lamar on Lonely Island's digital short "YOLO", which parodies the acronym for "You Only Live Once." His hosting was generally disliked by reviewers, who called it "mediocre" and "subpar." He appeared on season 40 of SNL where he played Freddie Mercury and sang a snippet of "Bohemian Rhapsody" in the "Joan Rivers" sketch.

From 2011 to 2019, Levine served as a contestant judge/coach on the reality talent television show, The Voice. The Voice has been credited with reviving Maroon 5's "faltering" career after the sub-par sales of Hands All Over as well as increasing Levine's popularity. According to polling firm E-Poll Market Research, awareness of Levine has nearly tripled since he joined the show. He has also been described as the "breakout" star of the series, with #TeamAdam and @AdamLevine scoring a respective 203,000 and 2.14 million Twitter mentions in the show's third season, higher than all the other coaches. In 2013, The Hollywood Reporter estimated that Levine was paid $10–12 million for each season of The Voice. In May 2019, Levine left the series after sixteen seasons and eight years. In June 2024, it was revealed that Levine would return to The Voice for the 27th season which aired in the spring of 2025. Levine later return again in the series' 29 and 30th seasons respectively.

The contestants of his team who won in the series are Javier Colon (season 1), Tessanne Chin (season 5), Jordan Smith (season 9), and Alexia Jayy (season 29), respectively.

In 2012, Levine appeared as a recurring character in American Horror Story: Asylum, the second season of the television series American Horror Story. He plays Leo Morrison, a newly-wed photographer visiting modern-day Briarcliff Manor, an insane asylum, on honeymoon with his wife, played by Jenna Dewan. The scenes were shot around his band's summer touring schedule. In an interview with E!, he said of his role: "It sounded like so much fun and that's why I wanted to do it ... this sounds, like, hysterical, funny, dark and cool and right up my alley". However, he admitted to not being a fan of the show nor horror genre in general, stating he didn't watch the episodes because "it's just so weird and disturbing".

In June 2012, Levine was cast in the musical romance-drama film Begin Again (originally titled Can a Song Save Your Life?). The film was directed by John Carney and Keira Knightley and Mark Ruffalo acted in the lead roles. In it, he plays Dave Kohl, Knightley's songwriting partner and former boyfriend of five years, who leaves her behind on finding success in the music industry. The film premiered at the 2013 Toronto International Film Festival to generally favorable reviews from critics.

In November 2013, Levine was named People magazine's Sexiest Man Alive, becoming the first singer and the second non-actor (after John F. Kennedy Jr.) to claim the title. He was ranked No. 41 on Glamour's "Sexiest Men of 2012" list. In 2008, he appeared on People's "Single and Sexy Men" list. He was elected TV's Most Crushworthy Male Reality Host/Judge in a poll held by Zap2it. In April 2012, Shalom Life ranked him Number 7 on its list of "Top 50 Hottest Jewish men in the world". Levine stripped naked for testicular cancer awareness for a centerfold in Cosmopolitan UK's February 2011 issue.

=== 222 Productions ===
In 2013, Levine started a production company 222 Productions and the first project was Sugar (2018), a YouTube Premium web television series which was inspired by the music video for the Maroon 5 song of the same name. It follows music artists to crash events for unsuspecting fans. The company produced a reality competition series Songland, which premiered on NBC on May 28, 2019, where Levine served as executive producer. The company signed a deal with Wheelhouse Entertainment.

=== Business ventures and endorsements ===
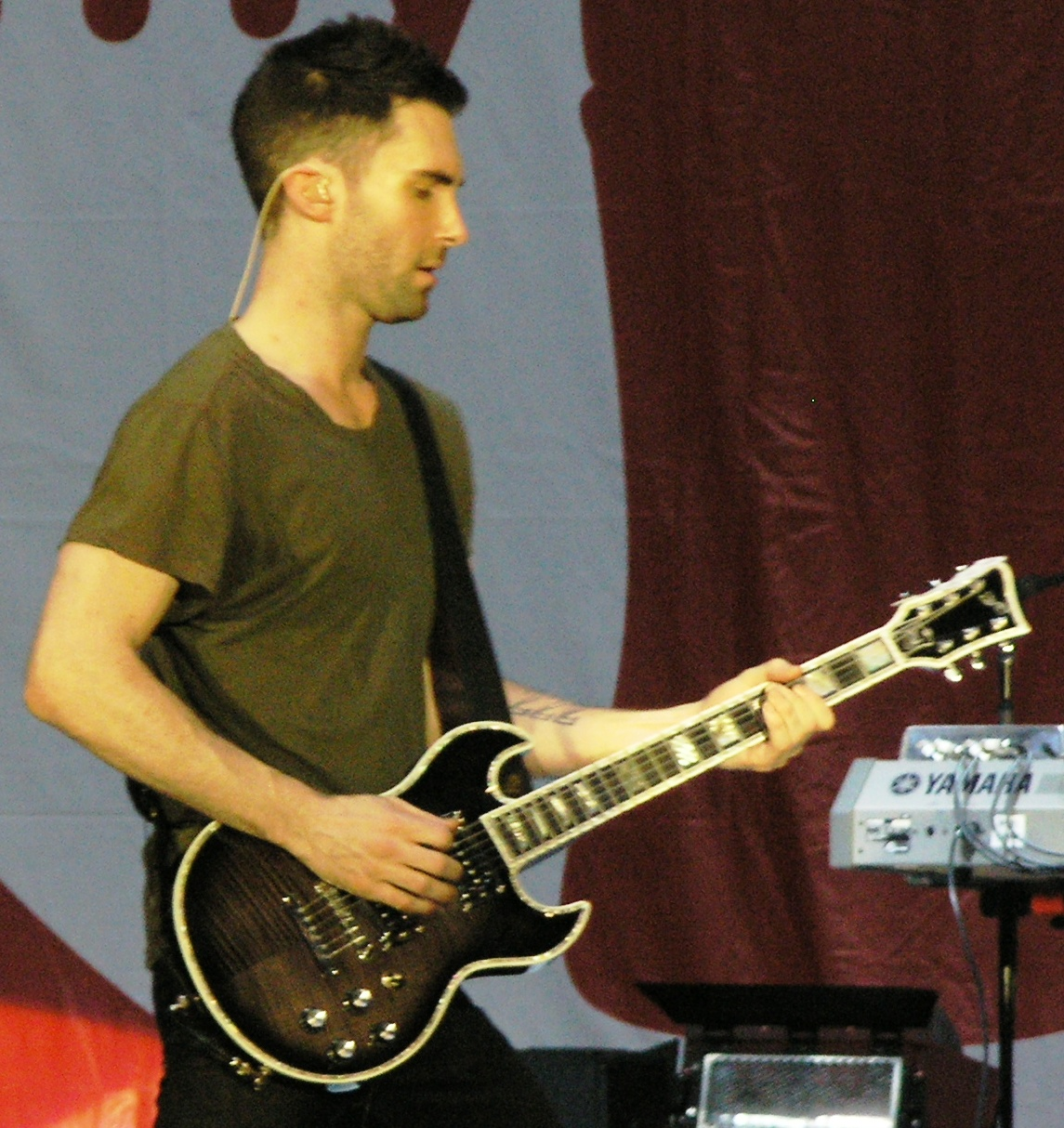
Levine playing the First Act 222 Guitar, which he helped design

In October 2008, Levine collaborated with First Act to create the First Act 222 Guitar, which was fashioned to his specifications. The guitar was sold via Target stores. Two years later he launched his own fashion line, entitled "222", at the Project Trade Show in Las Vegas. The collection features jeans, basic T-shirts and leather jackets. The venture was organized in partnership with his father, Fred Levine (who operates a chain of specialty boutiques), and his cousin, Sami Cooper.

In June 2011, Levine took part in an educational campaign to raise awareness of attention deficit hyperactivity disorder (ADHD). The project, titled "Own It", was created by Shire and organized in collaboration with the Attention Deficit Disorder Association (ADDA), Children and Adults with attention deficit hyperactivity disorder (CHADHD). The project targets people who were previously diagnosed with the disorder, focusing on how it may continue into adulthood. Levine, who himself was diagnosed with ADHD as a teenager, said: "This campaign is important to me because it can help young adults and adults realize that there's a chance they may still have ADHD if they had it as a kid". In connection to this, he wrote an article in ADDitude Magazine about his personal experience with it.

Levine founded his own record label, 222 Records in February 2012. He stated that he was inspired to start the label to sign on Rozzi Crane, an USC music student he discovered through a mutual friend. She became the first singer signed on to the label, followed by Glee actor Matthew Morrison, Mexican artist Diego Boneta, and The Voice season 2 contestant and part of Team Adam, the singer Tony Lucca. It was reported that he was negotiating further with potential distributors, as well as organizing staff, to operate as a full-fledged record company with departments such as marketing, radio and publicity.

In September 2012, Levine was in the Philippines to collaborate with the clothing company Bench; they launched the menswear collection. In January 2013, Levine announced he would be enter a partnership with Sears Holdings to launch a multi-department lifestyle brand of apparel and accessories collections. The company owns Kmart and ShopYourWay, a shopping social platform; it also includes rapper Nicki Minaj in the same contract. The menswear collection was launched on October 1 that year and conducts business via 500 Kmart stores across the US, as well as online. In an official statement, Levine said: "Partnering with ShopYourWay to develop this line was an exciting opportunity for me and I am really looking forward to diving into the process of designing an apparel and accessory collection". In an interview with People, he commented further, "it was cool that they really promoted creative control. I like to be involved with process rather than just phoning it in". Later, Levine became a celebrity spokesperson for Proactiv. In the commercial, Levine shares details about his acne experiences in high school, and promotes Proactiv Plus.

Levine collaborated with ID Perfumes to create his debut eponymous scent. The line was launched at the Premiere Fragrance Installation in Los Angeles in February 2013. The fragrance range, consisting of scents for both for men and women, is sold through Macy's department stores in microphone-shaped bottles. Speaking at its launch, Levine said: "The task was to make something that I would wear. So that was a process and we finally came to a great conclusion and it smells great" The fragrance garnered media attention for contradicting his tweet the previous year, in which he said that he wanted to "put an official ban on celebrity fragrances. Punishable by death from this point forward". In January 2020, Levine announced that he is the new Ambassador of the brand Shure for the wireless earphones and headphones, the Aonic 215 and 50, is available on electronic stores on April 2, 2020.

In 2021, Levine and his wife Prinsloo founded a tequila company called Calirosa. The brand's tequila bottles were made available from December 2021.

== Artistry ==
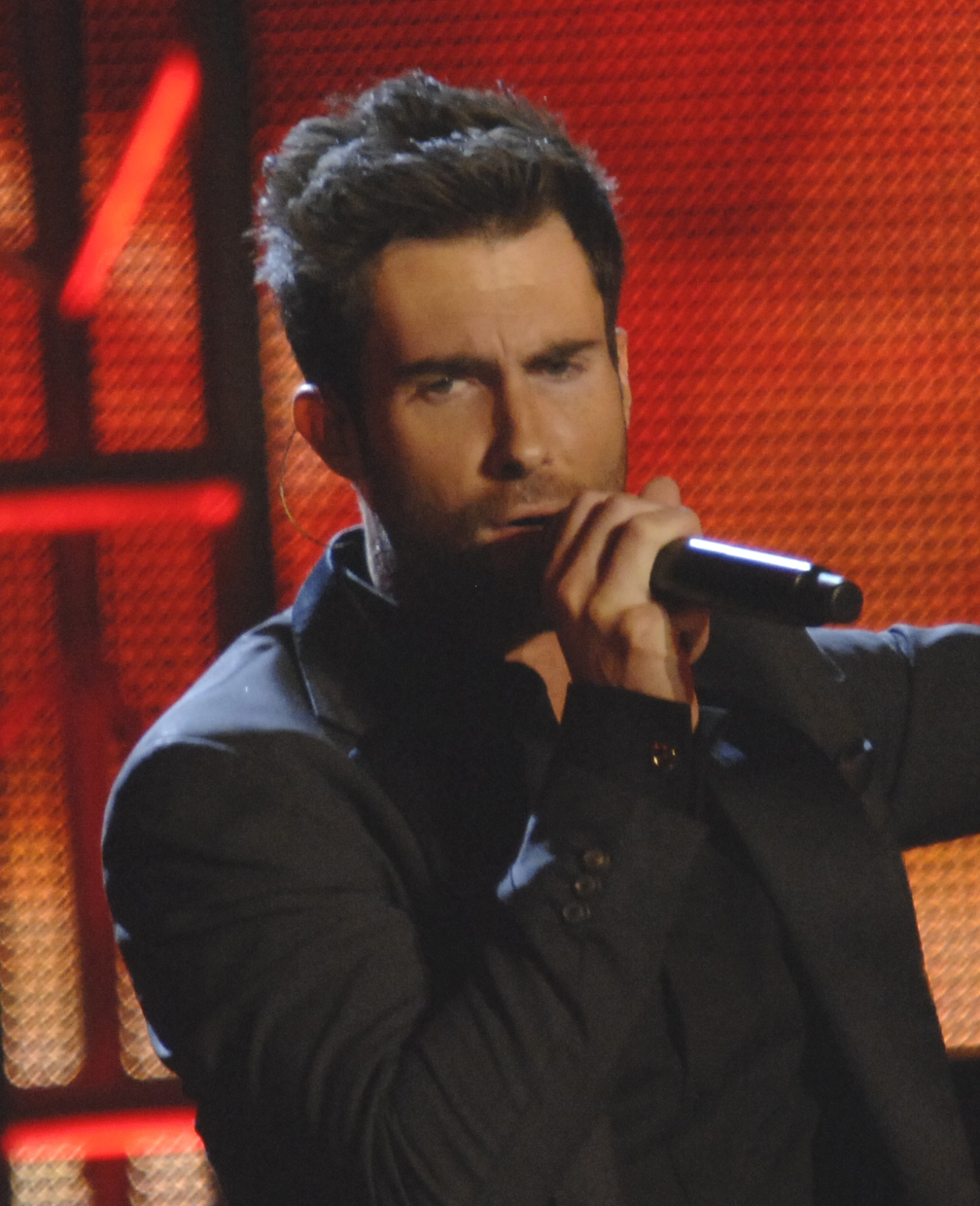
Levine performs in Washington, D.C.

Levine's interest in music started at around ten years of age, when he first started playing the guitar. He found music as an outlet for his feelings, stating: "I picked up a guitar and that was it. I fell so madly in love with it, it's all I did". He performed his first professional gig at The Troubadour when he was twelve, but he was so nervous that he played with his back to the audience. Throughout his childhood, he had a wide range of musical influences, including The Beatles, Fleetwood Mac, The Who, Pearl Jam, Soundgarden, Alice in Chains, and Nirvana, and, in high school, Bob Marley, Bill Withers, Al Green, Stevie Wonder, Marvin Gaye, Phish and Michael Jackson. He has also incorporated elements of The Police and Prince into his music. In an interview with Billboard, he explained the diversity of his influences: "I love every single kind of music ... even the most saccharine, sugary pop song can be the greatest thing ever. But so can a 25-minute crazy avant-garde fusion gnarly Herbie Hancock jam from the '70s".

Levine remembers that listening to "Are You That Somebody?" by Aaliyah convinced him to pursue a more soulful sound than that of the band he was performing with at the time, Kara's Flowers. His move to New York introduced him to a new music scene that involved hip-hop, R&B, gospel and soul music. He took to changing his musical style, extensively emulating Stevie Wonder. Subsequently, Songs About Jane was released, deemed "bluesy funk" and similar to the sound of English pop rock band Busted. Critics also drew comparisons between Levine and Jamiroquai singer Jay Kay.

While earlier work was deemed "vaguely funky white-soul" and "rock", recent ones have been judged to have a more reggae, anthemic pop sound, evoking comparisons to Coldplay. Levine refuses to fit his music into a genre, saying: "There's so much variety in music, it's silly to belong to a specific club and try to sound a certain way". He considers himself an orthodox lyricist sticking to conventional themes, acknowledging: "Romance, love, the lack thereof are still very big themes. I haven't figured out a way to use everything yet. As a songwriter, I'm still limited to that one thing." He also claims he does not like mincing words, stating in a Rolling Stone interview: "I was so sick of typical lyrics like 'Ooh, baby' and 'I love you' and all this vague shit. I thought the more explicit I got without being totally explicit was a nice approach".

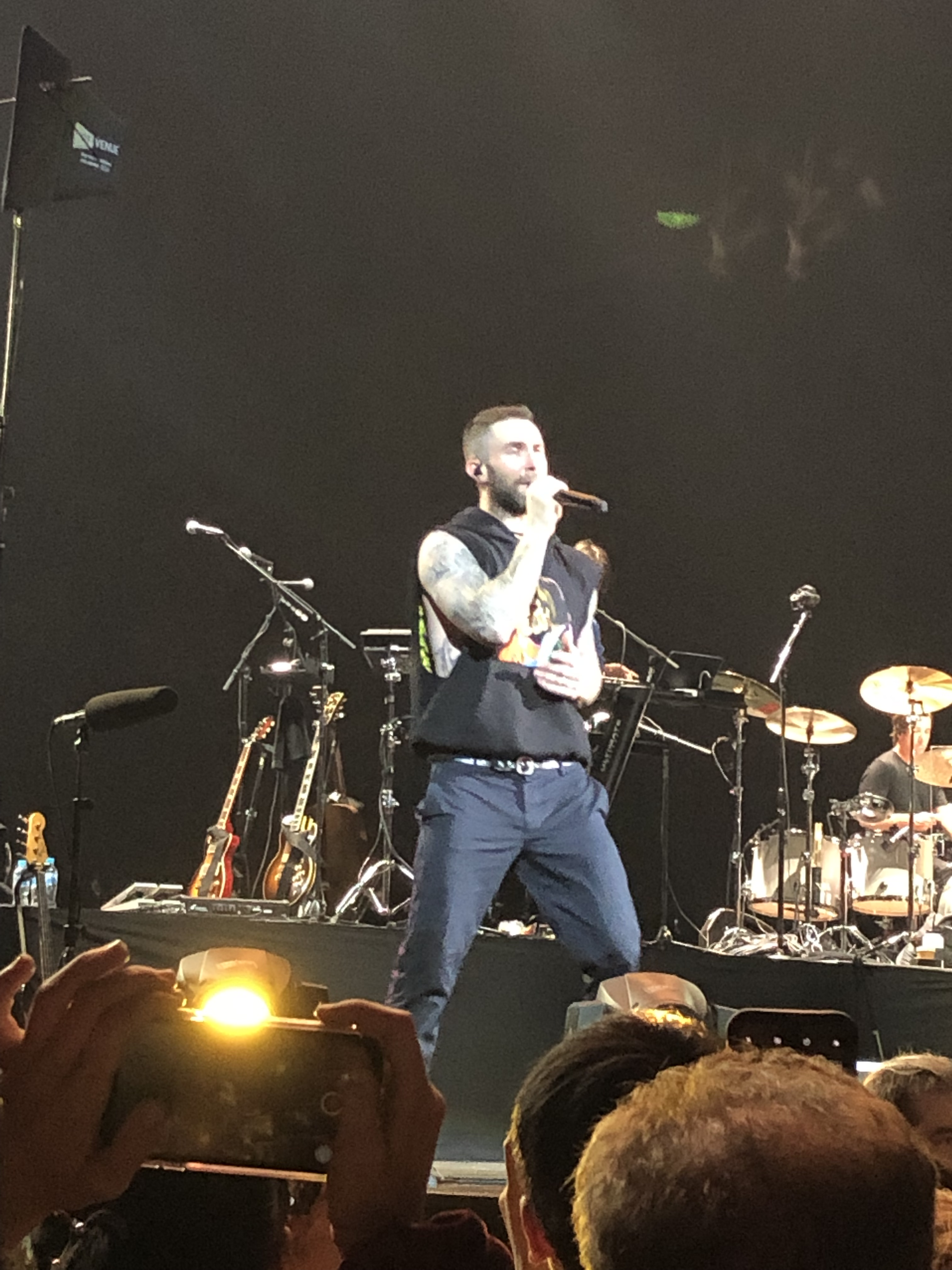
Levine performing in Sydney, Australia in February 2019

Levine is a countertenor and tenor, with a 4 octave vocal range and has been noted for his falsettos. Salon wrote: "When he's crooning come-ons, his voice lends the music a satisfying lewdness, a sense of sticky physicality that gives his snaky hooks a pheromonal urgency." In a review of It Won't Be Soon Before Long, Entertainment Weekly described his vocals as "smug, R&B-slick deadpan ... there's a twisted logic to his dispassionate delivery". In another review, Allmusic wrote "he knows that he's a pop guy, somewhat in the tradition of Hall & Oates, but he isn't trying to be retro, he's ... making records that are melodic, stylish, and soulful". In a review of the 2013 Honda Civic Tour, The Boston Globe also commented positively on his on-stage presence, which "exude[s] a sense of up-for-anything playfulness ... combined with a rock solid work ethic and a clear love for their audiences and performing".

Levine's popularity outside of his musical work has seen him tagged as a "stand-alone star," which critics say have pushed other members of Maroon 5 to the backseat, even in their music. Their guitarist Valentine noted that his vocals were a central aspect around which their music revolved. Conversely, others opine that Levine's fame has been a boost to the band, with Paper writing: "Maroon 5 has managed to ebb and flow with the times ... thanks in no small part to their frontman's uncanny ability to be extremely entertaining". Delta Sky described him as "a natural, if slightly neurotic, leading man". He claims that the image was consciously cultivated, explaining: "We talked about it a long time ago and decided I would step out, for us, not for me or my own ego ... We wanted there to be a frontman."

== Personal life ==
=== Relationships ===
In early 2010, while performing at the Sports Illustrated Swimsuit Issue release party in Las Vegas, Levine met Russian Sports Illustrated Swimsuit Issue model Anne Vyalitsyna and they soon began a relationship. They ended the relationship in April 2012 in an "amicable and supportive manner".

In May 2012, Levine began dating Behati Prinsloo, a Namibian Victoria's Secret model. The couple married on July 19, 2014, with Jonah Hill officiating the wedding. Levine and Prinsloo have two daughters, born in 2016 and 2018. In 2023 the couple's third child, a son, was born.

Levine and Hill have been friends since early childhood, having met in grade school. Hill's brother, Jordan Feldstein, managed Maroon 5 until his death. Despite attending different high schools, Levine has been friends with American actress Kate Hudson since they were teenagers.

=== Activism and philanthropy ===
Levine is supportive of gay rights. In 2011, Levine made a video on Maroon 5's official YouTube account in support of the It Gets Better Project. In January 2012, he announced that Maroon 5 had changed the location of their post-Grammy Awards show because of the "unnamed Los Angeles restaurant's backing of Proposition 8". He has a gay brother.

In July 2020, Levine and Prinsloo collaborated with Ferrari and Save the Children to raise funds to support U.S. education programs during the COVID-19 pandemic.

=== Allegations of misconduct ===
In 2013, Levine was mentioned in a hostile work environment lawsuit filed in Los Angeles Superior Court by an unnamed security guard who claimed that Universal Music Publishing Group's Santa Monica location was "infiltrated with pervasive drug use where you could smell marijuana seeping from various offices and openly used in common areas, and lounges". The guard claimed that when she complained about the cannabis smoke coming from one of the studios, she was told that "it's Adam Levine—if he wants to come to the lobby and do a line of cocaine on the floor, it's OK". In an official statement to The Hollywood Reporter, UMPG (Universal Music Publishing group) described the allegations as "absurd".

On February 27, 2020, Levine performed with his band Maroon 5 at the Viña del Mar International Song Festival. Their presentation, which began 29 minutes late, was listed as "mediocre" by the specialized press, inside and outside Chile, stating that Levine performed the songs with "lack of energy and out of tune", adding that the disappointment of the fans increased when videos were leaked, when he was leaving the stage, showing him angry and saying that "they were deceived", that it was a concert for television, and that Viña del Mar is a "shitty city". That created a general backlash from people very upset by the words of disrespect from the band's leader, and a disillusionment of fans. Levine later posted on Instagram to apologize for the incident and the band said it had experienced technical difficulties with the audio feed to Levine's ear pieces. Nevertheless, many Chilean citizens have since retaliated against Levine by posting recipes of traditional Chilean dishes on his Instagram account’s comment section.

In September 2022, Levine was accused by internet influencer/singer Sumner Stroh and three other women of cheating on Prinsloo with them. DMs, texts, and TikTok videos were made public to support these allegations. Levine denied having an affair, but has admitted to "crossing" the line and has "addressed ... and taken proactive steps to remedy this with my family". Some of his texts, released on the internet, birthed a slew of mocking memes.

== Discography ==
=== Singles as an artist ===
List of singles by year, title, peak chart positions, and album
Year	Title	Peak chart positions								Certifications	Album
Year	Title	US	AUS	CAN	GER	IRL	NL	NZ	UK	Certifications	Album
2005	"Heard 'Em Say" (Kanye West featuring Adam Levine)	26	27	19	95	23	67	15	22	RIAA: Platinum; BPI: Silver; RMNZ: Gold	Late Registration
2007	"Say It Again" (Natasha Bedingfield featuring Adam Levine)	—	—	—	—	—	—	—	—		N.B. and Pocketful of Sunshine
2010	"Bang Bang" (K'naan featuring Adam Levine)	—	—	71	—	—	—	—	105		Troubadour
2011	"Stereo Hearts" (Gym Class Heroes featuring Adam Levine)	4	4	7	—	4	8	3	3	RIAA: 5× Platinum; ARIA: 3× Platinum; BPI: 2× Platinum; MC: 2× Platinum; RMNZ: 5× Platinum	The Papercut Chronicles II
2011	"Man in the Mirror" (with Javier Colon)	45	—	66	—	—	—	—	—		Non-album single
2012	"Heavy" (PJ Morton featuring Adam Levine)	—	—	—	—	—	—	—	—		Following On My Mind (EP)
2012	"Yesterday" (with Tony Lucca)	68	—	64	—	—	—	—	—		Non-album singles
2012	"My Life" (50 Cent featuring Eminem and Adam Levine)	27	33	14	52	6	89	33	2	ARIA: Platinum; BPI: Silver; RIAA: Gold; RMNZ: Gold	Non-album singles
2013	"YOLO" (The Lonely Island featuring Adam Levine and Kendrick Lamar)	60	31	26	—	64	—	26	77		The Wack Album
2013	"Let It Be" (with Tessanne Chin)	76	—	35	—	—	—	—	—		The Voice: The Complete Season 5 Collection
2013	"Tiny Dancer" (with Will Champlin)	—	—	—	—	—	—	—	—		The Voice: The Complete Season 5 Collection
2014	"Somebody That I Used to Know" (with Christina Grimmie)	66	—	47	—	—	—	—	—		The Voice: The Complete Season 6 Collection
2014	"Lost Stars"	—	—	—	—	—	—	—	93	RMNZ: Gold	Begin Again
2014	"Lost Without U" (with Chris Jamison)	63	—	84	—	—	—	—	—		The Voice: The Complete Season 7 Collection
2014	"Don't Let the Sun Go Down on Me" (with Damien)	—	—	—	—	—	—	—	—		The Voice: The Complete Season 7 Collection
2014	"Lost Stars" (with Matt McAndrew)	83	—	86	—	—	—	—	—	RIAA: Platinum	The Voice: The Complete Season 7 Collection
2015	"Diamonds on the Soles of Her Shoes" (with Joshua Davis)	—	—	—	—	—	—	—	—		The Voice: The Complete Season 8 Collection
2015	"Locked Away" (R. City featuring Adam Levine)	6	2	2	6	7	4	6	2	ARIA: Gold; BPI: Platinum; MC: Platinum; RIAA: Platinum; RMNZ: 3× Platinum	What Dreams Are Made Of
2015	"God Only Knows" (with Jordan Smith)	90	—	—	—	—	—	—	—		The Voice: The Complete Season 9 Collection
2016	"I'm So Humble" (The Lonely Island featuring Adam Levine)	—	—	—	—	—	—	—	—		Popstar: Never Stop Never Stopping
2016	"Golden Slumbers/Carry That Weight/The End" (with Laith Al-Saadi)	—	—	—	—	—	—	—	—		The Voice: The Complete Season 10 Collection
2016	"Bye Bye Love" (with Billy Gillman)	—	—	—	—	—	—	—	—		The Voice: The Complete Season 11 Collection
2016	"Smooth" (with Josh Gallagher)	—	—	—	—	—	—	—	—		The Voice: The Complete Season 11 Collection
2017	"Mic Jack" (Big Boi featuring Adam Levine, Scar and Sleepy Brown)	—	—	—	—	—	—	—	—		Boomiverse
2017	"Let's Go Crazy" (with Jesse Larson)	—	—	—	—	—	—	—	—		The Voice: The Complete Season 12 Collection
2017	"Falling Slowly" (with Addison Agen)	—	—	—	—	—	—	—	—		The Voice: The Complete Season 13 Collection
2018	"Famous" (Remix) (French Montana featuring Adam Levine)	—	—	—	—	—	—	—	—		Non-album single
2019	"Baby Girl" (Joe Pesci featuring Adam Levine)	—	—	—	—	—	—	—	—		Pesci... Still Singing
2021	"Lifestyle" (Jason Derulo featuring Adam Levine)	71	—	54	—	92	41	— (Note: "Lifestyle" did not enter the NZ Top 40 Singles Chart, but peaked at number four on the NZ Hot Singles Chart.)	70	MC: Gold	Nu King
2021	"Good Mood" (from Paw Patrol: The Movie)	—	—	—	—	—	—	—	—		Non-album singles
2022	"Wings of Stone" (from The Bubble)	—	—	—	—	—	—	—	—		Non-album singles
2022	"Ojala" (with Maluma and the Rudeboyz)	—	—	—	—	—	—	—	—		Non-album singles
"—" denotes releases that did not chart or receive certification.

=== Guest appearances ===
List of non-single guest appearances, with other performing artists, showing year released and album name
Title	Year	Other performer(s)	Album
"Live Again"	2005	Ying Yang Twins	U.S.A. (United State of Atlanta)
"Wild Horses"	2005	Alicia Keys	Unplugged
"Signed, Sealed, Delivered (I'm Yours)"	2005	Stevie Wonder	Live 8
"Promised Land"	2008, 2009	Kanye West and Malik Yusef	Yes We Can: Voices of a Grassroots Movement and G.O.O.D. Morning, G.O.O.D. Night
"He Needs a Kidney" (from 30 Rock)	2009	Various Artists	Non-album single
"Gotten"	2010	Slash	Slash
"Prayer"	2011	Doug Crawford	One Day at a Time
"Stand Up"	2011	Javier Colon	Come Through for You
"Lost Stars" (Into the Night Mix)	2014	—N/a	Begin Again
"A Higher Place"	2014	—N/a	Begin Again
"No One Else Like You"	2014	—N/a	Begin Again
"Painkiller"	2015	Rozzi Crane	Space (EP)
"Go Now"	2016	—N/a	Sing Street
"Bus Stop"	2018	Allan Clarke, Graham Nash, Jesse Carmichael and Paul Shaffer	The Rock & Roll Hall of Fame: In Concert 2010 & 2011
"Carrie Anne"	2018	Allan Clarke, Graham Nash, Jesse Carmichael and Paul Shaffer	The Rock & Roll Hall of Fame: In Concert 2010 & 2011
"Earth"	2019	Lil Dicky, various artists	Non-album single
"My Cherie Amour"	2019	Joe Pesci	Pesci... Still Singing
"Trust Nobody"	2020	Lil Wayne	Funeral
"Same Guy"	2020	Jack Harlow	Thats What They All Say
"Girl, We Got With Your Mom"	2022	Ed Helms and Matt Rogers	Super Songs of Big Mouth – Volume 2
"Dads Out the Ass"	2022	Nick Kroll, Ed Helms and Matt Rogers	Super Songs of Big Mouth – Volume 2

=== Songwriting credits ===
Year	Artist(s)	Album	Song	Written with	Ref.
2005	Kanye West featuring Adam Levine	Late Registration	"Heard 'Em Say"	Kanye West, Michael Masser, Gerry Goffin	
2007	Natasha Bedingfield featuring Adam Levine	N.B. and Pocketful of Sunshine	"Say It Again"	Natasha Bedingfield, Mike Elizondo	
2010	Slash featuring Adam Levine	Slash	"Gotten"	Slash	
2011	The Cab	Symphony Soldier	"Animal"	Jesse Carmichael	
2011	Gym Class Heroes	The Papercut Chronicles II	"Stereo Hearts"	Travie McCoy, Disashi Lumumba-Kasongo, Eric Roberts, Matt McGinley, Benjamin Levin, Brandon Lowry, Ammar Malik, Dan Omelio	
2012	50 Cent featuring Eminem and Adam Levine	Non-album single	"My Life"	Curtis Jackson, Marshall Mathers, Larry Griffin Jr., Herb Rooney	
2013	The Lonely Island featuring Adam Levine and Kendrick Lamar	The Wack Album	"YOLO"	Andy Samberg, Akiva Schaffer, Jorma Taccone, Lamar, Khari Cain, Rhiannon Bryan, Rhydian Davies	
2013	Rozzi Crane featuring Kendrick Lamar	Rozzi Crane (EP)	"Crazy Ass Bitch" (Remix)	Crane, Lamar, Ali Tamposi, James Valentine, Stephen Wrabel	
2015	Rozzi Crane	Space (EP)	"Crazy Ass Bitch"	Crane, Lamar, Ali Tamposi, James Valentine, Stephen Wrabel	
2016	Adam Levine	Sing Street	"Go Now"	John Carney, Glen Hansard	
2017	G-Eazy featuring E-40 and Jay Ant	The Beautiful & Damned	"Charles Brown"	Gerald Gillum, Earl Stevens, Jay Fort, Oliver Rodriguez, David Teel, Gwitira, Paulo Rodriguez, Gerry Goffin, Kanye West, Michael Masser	
2017	Chance the Rapper and Jeremih	Merry Christmas Lil' Mama: Re-Wrapped (Mixtape)	"Big Kid Again"	Chancelor J. Bennett, Jeremy Felton, Peter Wilkins, Kanye West, Gerry Goffin, Michael Masser, Tommy James, Bob King	
2020	Lil Wayne featuring Adam Levine	Funeral	"Trust Nobody"	Dwayne Carter, Ryan Ogren, Brandon Hamlin, Ben Diehl, Jake Torrey, Michael Matosic, Jacob Kasher Hindlin	
2020	Cast of Sing Street	Sing Street: The Musical	"Go Now"	John Carney, Glen Hansard	
2020	Jack Harlow featuring Adam Levine	Thats What They All Say	"Same Guy"	Jackman Harrlow, Braden Watt, Taji Morgan, Nathan Ward II, Carlos Homs	
2021	Jason Derulo featuring Adam Levine	Nu King	"Lifestyle"	Amy Allen, Casey Smith, Jacob Kashe, Jason Derulo, Kevin White, Michael Woods, Natalie Salomon, Pablo Bowman	
2021	Adam Levine	Non-album singles	"Good Mood" (from Paw Patrol: The Movie)	Shellback, Savan Kotecha, Oscar Gorres	
2022	Maluma, the Rudeboyz and Adam Levine	Non-album singles	"Ojala"	Maluma, the Rudeboyz, Rios, Ily Wonder, Sencillo305, Jacob Kasher Hindlin, Jake Torrey	
2023	Purple Tears featuring Swae Lee	Non-album singles	"Work It Out"	Swae Lee, Landline, Ryan Press	

== Videography ==
=== As lead artist ===
Year	Title	Director(s)	Ref.
2014	"Lost Stars"	None	
2014	"Lost Stars" (Acoustic Version)	Travis Schneider	
2016	"Go Now"	None	
2021	"Good Mood"	None	
2022	"Wings of Stone"	Katy Fishell and Joe Cappa	
2022	"Ojala" (with Maluma and the Rudeboyz)	Diane Martel	

=== As featured artist ===
Year	Title	Artist(s)	Director(s)	Ref.
2005	"Heard 'Em Say" (Version 1)	Kanye West featuring Adam Levine	Michel Gondry	
2005	"Heard 'Em Say" (Version 2)	Kanye West featuring Adam Levine	Bill Plympton, Joe DeMaio and Kanye West	
2007	"Iran So Far"	The Lonely Island featuring Adam Levine	Akiva Schaffer	
2010	"Bang Bang"	K'naan featuring Adam Levine	Malik Sayeed	
2011	"Stereo Hearts"	Gym Class Heroes featuring Adam Levine	Hiro Murai	
2012	"Gotten"	Slash featuring Adam Levine	Clifton Collins Jr.	
2012	"My Life"	50 Cent featuring Eminem and Adam Levine	Rich Lee	
2013	"YOLO"	The Lonely Island featuring Adam Levine and Kendrick Lamar	Akiva Schaffer and Jorma Taccone	
2014	"Heavy"	PJ Morton featuring Adam Levine	Orson Whales	
2015	"Locked Away"	R. City featuring Adam Levine	Gil Green	
2017	"Mic Jack"	Big Boi featuring Adam Levine, Scar and Sleepy Brown	Motion Family	
2018	"Famous" (Remix)	French Montana featuring Adam Levine	None	
2020	"Trust Nobody"	Lil Wayne featuring Adam Levine	Katia Temkin	
2021	"Lifestyle"	Jason Derulo featuring Adam Levine	None	

=== Cameo appearances ===
Year	Title	Artist(s)	Director(s)	Ref.
2006	"God's Gonna Cut You Down"	Johnny Cash	Tony Kaye	
2010	"We Are the World 25 for Haiti"	Artists for Haiti	Paul Haggis	
2011	"Uncharted"	Sara Bareilles	Travis Schneider and Javier Dunn	
2019	"Earth"	Lil Dicky	Nigel W. Tierney and Federico Heller	

== Filmography ==
=== Film ===
Year	Title	Role	Notes
2005	Email!	Computer (voice)	Short film
2007	HJ Train	Himself	Short film
2010	Vevey Forever	Himself	Documentary
2010	Music	Himself	Documentary
2013	Begin Again	Dave Kohl	
2014	Lennon or McCartney	Himself	Short documentary film; interview clip
2015	Pitch Perfect 2	Himself	Cameo appearance
2015	Unity	Narrator	Documentary
2015	Klown Forever	Himself	Cameo appearance
2016	Popstar: Never Stop Never Stopping	Himself	
2017	Fun Mom Dinner	Luke	
2017	The Clapper	Ralph Ranter	

=== Television ===
Year	Title	Role	Notes
1997	Beverly Hills, 90210	Himself / Performer (with Kara's Flowers)	Episode: "Forgive and Forget"
2004–2021	Saturday Night Live	Himself (musical guest / host)	9 episodes (as Himself); Episode: "Adam Levine / Kendrick Lamar" (as Host);
2007	Canadian Idol	Himself (mentor) / Performer (with Maroon 5)	Season 5; 2 episodes
2008	Jimmy Kimmel's Big Night of Stars	Himself	Cameo appearance, television special
2008	CSI: NY	Himself / Performer (with Maroon 5)	Episode: "Page Turner"
2009	30 Rock	Himself	Episode: "Kidney Now!"
2011–2019; 2025–2026	The Voice	Himself / Coach / Performer (as Himself and with Maroon 5)	As Coach (seasons 1–16, 27, 29–30); Winning coach (seasons 1, 5, 9 and 29)
2011	Top Gear	Himself	Episode: "The $500 Challenge"
2011	Top Chef Masters	Himself	Episode: "I'm with the Band"
2012	American Horror Story: Asylum	Leo Morrison	3 episodes
2012	The Haney Project	Himself	Season 4
2013	Family Guy	Himself (voice)	Episode: "Quagmire's Quagmire"
2015	Best Time Ever with Neil Patrick Harris	Himself	Episode: "Reese Witherspoon"
2016	Broad City	Himself	Episode: "Jews on a Plane"
2017	Rock & Roll Road Trip with Sammy Hagar	Himself	Episode: "Marooned in LA"
2018	A Legendary Christmas with John and Chrissy	Himself	Cameo appearance
2020	The Rock & Roll Hall of Fame 2020 Inductions	Himself	Television special
2022	Big Mouth	Bros 4 Life Member #2 (voice)	Episode: "Dadda Dia!"
2025	Hot Ones	Himself	Episode: "Adam Levine Gives a Halftime Speech While Eating Spicy Wings"

=== Web ===
Year	Title	Role	Notes	Ref.
2010	Palm Trees & Power Lines	Himself	3 episodes	
2018	Sugar	Himself	Episode: "Maroon 5 surprise a teen for the party of the year."	

=== Other works ===
==== Music videos ====
Year	Song title	Artist	Role	Notes
2015	"This Summer"	Maroon 5	Director	Co-directed with Travis Schneider

==== Producer ====
Year	Title	Role	Notes
2018	Sugar	Executive	Also developer
2019–2020	Songland	Executive	

==== Miscellaneous crew ====
Year	Title	Role
1999–2000	Judging Amy	Assistant to writer; 23 episodes

=== Video games ===
Year	Title	Role	Notes
2009	Band Hero	Himself	Voice and likeness

== Awards and nominations ==
Year	Association	Category	Work	Result	Ref.
2006	BMI Pop Awards	Songwriter of the Year	"Sunday Morning"	Won	
2011	OFTA Television Award	Best Individual Host or Panelist in a Reality or Non-Fiction Program (with Christina Aguilera, Carson Daly, CeeLo Green & Blake Shelton)	The Voice	Won	
2011	Teen Choice Awards	Choice TV: Personality	The Voice	Nominated	
2012	MuchMusic Video Awards	International Video of the Year – Group	"Stereo Hearts" (with Gym Class Heroes)	Nominated	
2012	MuchMusic Video Awards	Most Streamed Video of the Year	"Stereo Hearts" (with Gym Class Heroes)	Nominated	
2013	BMI Pop Awards	BMI President's Award	Himself	Won	
2013	BMI Pop Awards	Song of the Year (with Benny Blanco & Ammar Malik)	"Moves Like Jagger"	Won	
2013	NewNowNext Awards	Coolest Cameo	American Horror Story	Nominated	
2013	NewNowNext Awards	Hottest, Sexiest Ink	Himself	Won	
2013	People's Choice Awards	Favorite Celebrity Judge	The Voice	Nominated	
2013	Teen Choice Awards	Choice TV Personality: Male	The Voice	Nominated	
2014	BMI Pop Awards	Songwriter of the Year	"Daylight" "Love Somebody" "One More Night"	Won	
2014	Teen Choice Awards	Choice Reality Personality: Male	The Voice	Won	
2014	Young Hollywood Awards	Best Bromance (with Blake Shelton)	The Voice	Nominated	
2015	RTHK International Pop Poll Awards	Top 10 International Gold Song	"Lost Stars" (from Begin Again)	Won	
2016	OFTA Television Award	Best Individual Host or Panelist in a Reality or Non-Fiction Program	The Voice	Won	
2017	MTV Movie & TV Awards	Best Duo (with Blake Shelton)	The Voice	Nominated	
2018	Variety's Hitmakers Awards	Hitmaker of the Year	Himself	Won	
2021	Hollywood Music in Media Awards	Original Song — Animated Film (with Karl Johan Schuster, Savan Kotecha & Oscar Görres)	"Good Mood" (from Paw Patrol: The Movie)	Won	
2023	Premios Juventud	OMG Collaboration	"Ojala" (with Maluma and the Rudeboyz)	Nominated	
2024	Premio Lo Nuestro	Crossover Collaboration of the Year	"Ojala" (with Maluma and the Rudeboyz)	Nominated	
