= Sing Street (soundtrack) =

2016 soundtrack to the musical comedy film directed by John Carney

Sing Street (Original Motion Picture Soundtrack)

Soundtrack album by Various artists
- Released: 11 March 2016
- Studios: Windmill Lane Studios; Westland Studios; The Cauldron Recording Studios (Dublin, Ireland)
- Genres: Contemporary pop; contemporary rock; new wave; post-punk; punk rock; alternative rock; indie rock; college rock
- Length: 51:08
- Label: Decca
- Producer: John Carney

Sing Street (Original Motion Picture Soundtrack) is the soundtrack album to the 2016 film Sing Street, released on 11 March 2016 by Decca Records. The album features original songs from artists, such as the Cure, a-ha, Duran Duran, the Clash, Hall & Oates, Spandau Ballet, the Blades and the Jam, representing the Irish music culture from the 1980s. It also features a few original songs performed by the fictional band Sing Street, composed by Danny Wilson frontman Gary Clark, while John Carney, Ken and Carl Papenfus of the band Relish, Graham Henderson and Zamo Riffman, also share the composing credits. An original song, "Go Now" by Adam Levine was released as a single, with a music video accompanying its release on 9 April 2016. It was released on physical CDs on 15 April 2016 and a vinyl edition released on 3 June 2016. The soundtrack received critical acclaim as well as numerous accolades.

A 10th anniversary edition of the album was released on 24 April 2026, which includes two new songs; "Dream for You" from the film's musical adaptation and the covered version of "Drive It Like You Stole It" by the artist credited as Sing Street Band.

== Reception ==
The music received critical acclaim. Michael Roffman of Consequence of Sound gave an A− score to the album and said, "if you’ve made it this far, you’re already getting up to flip the damn thing over and start again. That was the power of Once and that’s the overwhelming mastery of Sing Street. Nearly a decade later, Carney has carved out another must-have soundtrack chock-full of favorites that will fluctuate upon every listen." Marcy Donelson of AllMusic wrote: "Sing Street features a soundtrack of MTV favorites from the era mixed with faux '80s originals by the fictional Sing Street band. The new songs were written by a team led by Carney and songwriter/film composer Gary Clark. Licensed songs include hits from the Cure, the Jam, Duran Duran, Joe Jackson, and more, for nearly an hour of new wave goodness." Allie Funk of Bustle said: "With so many ways to enjoy the soundtrack, a musical trip back to the '80s is a cinch. So pull out your best punk gear, indulge in some heavy eyeliner and teased hair, and rock out to songs old and new on the Sing Street soundtrack." Avant Music Port wrote that the compositions "are perfectly-pitched, sounding at once like original '80s lost hits and also aurally echoing Conor's exploration of music discovered on Top of the Pops."

== Track listing ==
| No. | Title | Artist(s) | Length |
|---|---|---|---|
| 1. | "Rock n Roll Is a Risk" (Dialogue) | Jack Reynor | 0:05 |
| 2. | "Stay Clean" | Motörhead | 2:39 |
| 3. | "The Riddle of the Model" | Sing Street | 1:48 |
| 4. | "Rio" | Duran Duran | 5:29 |
| 5. | "Up" | Sing Street | 2:43 |
| 6. | "To Find You" | Sing Street | 3:20 |
| 7. | "Town Called Malice" | The Jam | 2:53 |
| 8. | "In Between Days" | The Cure | 2:56 |
| 9. | "A Beautiful Sea" | Sing Street | 3:03 |
| 10. | "Maneater" | Hall & Oates | 4:31 |
| 11. | "Steppin' Out" | Joe Jackson | 4:16 |
| 12. | "Drive It Like You Stole It" | Sing Street | 3:36 |
| 13. | "Up" | The Score | 1:53 |
| 14. | "Pop Muzik" | M | 3:16 |
| 15. | "Girls" | Sing Street | 1:57 |
| 16. | "Brown Shoes" | Sing Street | 2:51 |
| 17. | "Go Now" | Adam Levine | 3:52 |
| Total length: | | | 51:08 |

== Accolades ==
| Award | Date of ceremony | Category | Recipient(s) | Result | Ref(s) |
|---|---|---|---|---|---|
| Critics' Choice Awards | 11 December 2016 | Best Song | "Drive It Like You Stole It" – Gary Clark | Nominated | |
| Empire Awards | 19 March 2017 | Best Soundtrack | Sing Street | Nominated | |
| Houston Film Critics Society | 6 January 2017 | Best Original Song | "Drive It Like You Stole It" – Gary Clark | Nominated | |
| Irish Film & Television Awards | 9 April 2016 | Best Original Score | Gary Clark and John Carney | Nominated | |
| San Diego Film Critics Society | | Best Original Score | Sing Street | Won | |
| St. Louis Gateway Film Critics Association | 18 December 2016 | Best Soundtrack | Sing Street | Won | |
| St. Louis Gateway Film Critics Association | 18 December 2016 | Best Song | "Drive It Like You Stole It"– Gary Clark | Nominated | |
