= Oh My Love (The Score song) =

Single by the Score

from the EP Where Do You Run and the album Atlas (Deluxe)
- Released: January 27, 2015
- Genre: Pop rock
- Length: 3:38
- Label: Republic
- Songwriters: Eddie Anthony Ramirez Jr., Edan Chai Dover

The Score singles chronology
"Don't Wanna Wake Up" (2014)	"Oh My Love" (2015)	"White Iverson" (2015)

Music video
- "Oh My Love" on YouTube

"Oh My Love" is a song recorded by American band The Score. The track became known after it was used in an advertising campaign by the British supermarket chain Asda. The song became the most requested song on Shazam in 2015. The band, who were unsigned at the time, were subsequently given a record deal off the back of the song's popularity.

The single was released on 27 January 2015. It peaked at number 43 on the UK Singles Chart in the chart week ending 30 July 2015.

== Background ==
The Score, based in Los Angeles, were unsigned when the British supermarket Asda chose "Oh My Love" as the soundtrack to its 2015 "Save Money, Live Better" advertising campaign. According to Chris Chalmers from the company, "Part of [The Score]'s attraction was that they were unsigned and unknown. There is a great back-story, where the manager had the great sense to send the track to all CEO's of major UK businesses. It found its way to us and felt like a brilliant track to support our campaign".

The track gained more notability as it became the most popular track of 2015 from an advert on the music identification app Shazam. Based on this success, the song eventually reached number 43 on the UK Singles Chart on 30 July 2015. It also peaked at number 17 on the iTunes Chart the same week.

The breakout success of "Oh My Love" led to The Score signing a record deal with Republic Records. Their debut album, Atlas, was released on 13 October 2017 and included "Oh My Love" on its deluxe edition.

The song also appears in the 2015 film Alvin and the Chipmunks: The Road Chip and its soundtrack.

== Weekly charts ==
Chart (2014)	Peak position
UK Singles (OCC)	43

== Certifications ==
Region	Certification	Certified units/sales
United Kingdom (BPI)	Silver	60,000^{‡}
^{‡} Sales+streaming figures based on certification alone.
