= Sugar (2018 TV series) =

American web series

- Title screen from the first episode
- Genre: Reality
- Based on: "Sugar" by Maroon 5 and; Wedding Crashers by; Steve Faber; Bob Fisher
- Developed by: Adam Levine
- Starring: Adam Levine; Snoop Dogg; Charlie Puth; A$AP Ferg; Blake Shelton; Fifth Harmony; Bad Bunny; Kelly Clarkson
- Country of origin: United States
- Original language: English
- No. of seasons: 1
- No. of episodes: 8

Production
- Executive producers: Jay Renfroe; David Garfinkle; David Dobkin; Megan Wolpert Dobkin; Adam Levine; Josh Gummersall; Jordan Feldstein (Note: Jordan Feldstein let the production use his name and was credited as an executive producer but was not involved in the series. Feldstein was posthumously credited in the series' episodes.); Todd Yasui
- Producers: Chris Maguire; Adam Harrison
- Cinematography: Edgar Martin
- Running time: 9–18 minutes
- Production companies: 222 Productions; Big Kid Pictures; Renegade 83; Entertainment One

Original release
- Network: YouTube Premium
- Release: August 15, 2018

Sugar is an American reality television series that premiered on August 15, 2018, on YouTube Premium. It is based on the 2005 comedy film Wedding Crashers and the music video for American band Maroon 5's 2015 single "Sugar". The series features a different popular music artist or group surprising fans who have given back to their community, which include pop-up performances and appearances. The show was developed by Adam Levine and is executive produced by Levine and David Dobkin.

== Premise ==
The inaugural season of Sugar featured eight episodes, which aired weekly on YouTube Premium. The series features a different popular music artist or group each week surprising fans who have given back to their community.

Adam Levine made a public statement upon the announcement of the series.

I'm really excited to show everyone this interesting show and experiment filled with many different experiences, as well as and emotions; based on the concept behind our video for ‘Sugar.’ I'm extremely grateful and equally excited for all who participated on both sides of the camera.

== Production ==
=== Development ===
In October 2015, the series was first announced by NBC, the series it was inspired by the Maroon 5 music video "Sugar". On July 13, 2018, it was announced that YouTube has picked-up the series and had given the production a series order for a first season comprising eight episodes and that the show would premiere on August 15, 2018. Executive producers are include Adam Levine, David Dobkin, Jay Renfroe, David Garfinkle, Megan Wolpert Dobkin, Josh Gummersall, and Todd Yasui. Dobkin directed the first two episodes and Alex Van Wagner directed the series' remaining episodes. Production companies involved with the series are expected to include 222 Productions and Renegade 83. On August 3, 2018, the official trailer for the series was released.

Jordan Feldstein was originally announced and involvement as executive producer in the series. Feldstein who died in 2017, with the series' first episode was dedicated to his memory.

=== Casting ===
The series' celebrity guests included Maroon 5, Blake Shelton, Snoop Dogg, Charlie Puth, Kelly Clarkson, A$AP Ferg, Fifth Harmony, and Bad Bunny.

== Episodes ==
No.	Title	Featured guest(s)	Directed by	Original release date
1	"Maroon 5 surprise a teen for the party of the year."	Maroon 5	David Dobkin	August 15, 2018
2	"A$AP Ferg drops in on a deserving NYC public school teacher."	A$AP Ferg	David Dobkin	August 15, 2018
3	"Fifth Harmony surprises a remarkable fan and her wheelchair dance group."	Fifth Harmony	Alex van Wagner	August 15, 2018
4	"Bad Bunny pays it back to a deaf fan who loves to dance"	Bad Bunny	Alex van Wagner	August 15, 2018
5	"Charlie Puth gives a pop up performance for fan on her 17th birthday"	Charlie Puth	Alex van Wagner	August 15, 2018
6	"Snoop Dogg surprises a young father who is working to turn his life around."	Snoop Dogg	Alex van Wagner	August 15, 2018
7	"Kelly Clarkson crashes a fan’s wedding for the first dance"	Kelly Clarkson	Alex van Wagner	August 15, 2018
8	"Blake Shelton surprises a fan inspired by his music while in foster care"	Blake Shelton	Alex van Wagner	August 15, 2018
