= The Rock & Roll Hall of Fame 2020 Inductions =

- Directed by: Joel Gallen
- Country of origin: United States
- Original language: English

Production
- Executive producers: Joel Gallen; John Sykes; Joel Peresman

Original release
- Network: HBO
- Release: November 7, 2020

The Rock & Roll Hall of Fame 2020 Inductions is an American television special that premiered on HBO on November 7, 2020. The ceremony was initially planned for May 2020 but was postponed due to the COVID-19 pandemic. The class of inductees includes The Notorious B.I.G., The Doobie Brothers, Nine Inch Nails, T. Rex, and Depeche Mode, as well as Irving Azoff and Jon Landau, who both received the Ahmet Ertegun Award for Lifetime Achievement.

== Guest list ==
- Luke Bryan
- Sean Combs
- Miley Cyrus
- Billy Gibbons
- Dave Grohl
- Don Henley
- Jennifer Hudson
- Billy Idol
- Iggy Pop
- Alicia Keys
- Adam Levine
- Chris Martin
- Lin-Manuel Miranda
- Brad Paisley
- Bruce Springsteen
- St. Vincent
- Ringo Starr
- Gwen Stefani
- Charlize Theron
- Nancy Wilson
