= The Score (band) =

American alternative duo

- The Score performing at Dürer Kert in Budapest, Hungary, June 2022

Background information
- Origin: New York City
- Genres: Alternative rock; pop rock; electronic
- Years active: 2011 – 2026
- Label: Imperial Records
- Past members: Eddie Anthony Ramirez; Edan Chai Dover
- Website: thescoremusic.com

The Score was an American alternative rock duo formed in New York City in 2011 that was mostly based in Los Angeles. The group consisted of Eddie Anthony Ramirez (lead vocals, guitar) and Edan Chai Dover (backing vocals, keys, producer). Chris Coombs and Logan Baldwin were touring members for the band. The Score were signed to Republic Records in 2015 after their song "Oh My Love" was featured in an advertising campaign for Asda supermarkets. The duo was also signed to Imperial Records.

== History ==
=== 2011–2013: Early years ===
Eddie Anthony and Edan Chai Dover formed the group in 2011, previously working together as a songwriting duo, and made collaborative demos released on SoundCloud. In 2012 the band released two singles, "Dancing Shoes" and "Don't Wanna Wake Up", on their YouTube channel. They announced that their debut EP would come out in early 2013.

In 2013 the band released a cover of "Sweet Nothing" by Calvin Harris on YouTube. They started making covers every Sunday and releasing them on YouTube as a free download called ScoreSundays. They released their lead single to their debut EP, "Not Just Another Way", in early 2013. Not long after the single's release their debut EP was canceled for unknown reasons. It was intended to feature "Not Just Another Way", and unreleased demos including "Hit List", "4 AM", and "Almost".

=== 2014–2015: The Score EP, The Score EP 2, Where Do You Run EP, and singles ===
The Score released their debut EP, The Score EP, in 2014, which features earlier songs, "Dancing Shoes" and "Don't Wanna Wake Up". The EP also contained their earlier released covers of "Say Something" and "Holy Grail" as bonus tracks, as well as new songs, "Til The Stars Burn Blue", "Haunted", and "This Beating Heart," and a ScoreSundays acoustic version of "Dancing Shoes". The Score continued to release weekly ScoreSundays throughout the year.

The Score announce the release of their second EP, The Score EP 2, in 2015 with the lead single, "Better Than One". The EP included tracks "Lost You", "Fall For Me", featuring Kate Lynne Logan, "In The Dark", "Real Life", and a remix of "Lost You" with Wavve Pilot.

The duo gained recognition in early 2015, when the British supermarket chain Asda used their single "Oh My Love" in a major advertising campaign titled "Save Money, Live Better". According to Asda, part of the reason why they selected the song was because "they were unsigned and unknown". The song's placement in the advertisement helped The Score gain recognition and "Oh My Love" went to No. 43 on the UK Singles Chart in July 2015. In the same year, the track became the most-detected song from an advertisement on Shazam. The song also appeared in the 2015 film Alvin and the Chipmunks: The Road Chip. They released a single, "Catching Fire", shortly after the release of Oh My Love.

After the success of "Oh My Love", The Score signed a record deal with Republic Records. They released their third EP, Where Do You Run, in September 2015. The Score then released their cover of Post Malone's song "White Iverson" shortly afterwards.

=== 2016: "On and On" and Unstoppable EP ===
On April 8, 2016, The Score released the song "Up" for the soundtrack of the musical film, Sing Street. The duo released the single "On and On", which was featured in the spring programming lineup for HBO. After announcing on social media that a new EP would be released, The Score officially released their fourth EP, Unstoppable on September 23, 2016. The title track was later featured in the 2017 Power Rangers film. In 2017, "Unstoppable" was also used as the theme song for the World Series of Poker main event streamed live on ESPN2 and Poker Central beginning on July 8. In 2018, the song was used in advertising campaigns for Jeep Grand Cherokee. "Unstoppable" was also used in a Dude Perfect video titled "Water Bottle Flip Edition", which came out on July 18, 2016. "Unstoppable" received a platinum award from RIAA.

=== 2017–2018: Atlas ===
The Score released their fifth EP titled Myths & Legends on April 14, 2017, which included the singles "Revolution" and "Legend", which were later included on their debut studio album. The album, titled Atlas, was released on October 13, 2017. "Legend" was featured in the soundtrack for NHL 18, released on September 15, 2017. It was also featured in the soundtrack for Asphalt 9: Legends and Apex Legends. A stripped version of Myths & Legends, titled Stripped, was released on August 11, 2017.

In 2018, the band opened for Echosmith to support their "Inside a Dream Tour". In the fall of 2018, they were scheduled to return in their "Revolution Tour" with special guest The Orphan, The Poet.

=== 2018–2021: Pressure, Stay, and Carry On ===
In 2018, The Score released the single "Glory", which would go on to be the lead single from their seventh EP, Pressure. They released the second single, "Stronger", on September 7, 2018. According to their Twitter account, the song signified a new era for the band. The official music video for the song, directed by Jason Lester, was released on YouTube on October 4, 2018, and it was followed soon after by the release of the single, "The Fear".

On January 29, 2019, The Score announced that Pressure would be released on February 1, 2019. It included the song "Dreamin'", featuring the American musician Blackbear. It also included the previously released singles.

On May 24, 2019, The Score released the single titled "Stay". On August 1, 2019, The Score announced their eighth EP of the same name, which was released on August 9. It includes six songs, including the title track. On December 13, 2019, the band released "Bulletproof" featuring Xylø, and was included at the end credits of the Netflix film 6 Underground. Norwich City F.C. used the single "Stronger" in their video package during the 2019–20 football season before all of the team's home matches at Carrow Road in the Premier League.

On April 22, 2020, the band released the single "Best Part" on April 24, which would go on the be the lead single of their second studio album, Carry On. On June 19, 2020, the band released the second single "The Champion". On July 20, the band revealed the lyrics for their third single titled "All of Me" featuring Blink-182 drummer Travis Barker, as well as promising a signed lyric sheet to the first five to guess the feature. The song was released on July 24. On July 31, the band announced Carry On, which released on August 28, 2020.

=== 2021–2022: Chrysalis, Metamorph, and "Bad Days" ===
In February 2021, The band's songs "Unstoppable" and "The Champion" were played at Super Bowl LV. The Score released the singles "Victorious", on June 25, 2021, "Head Up", on July 23, and "Top of the World" on August 20. These songs were included on the band's ninth EP, Chrysalis, which was released on September 24, 2021. This EP includes these previously released songs and two new songs: "Pull the Cord" and "Good To Be Alive".

The Score released the singles "Alarm", on October 22, 2021, and "Big Dreams", featuring Michael Fitzpatrick from Fitz and the Tantrums, on December 9, and "Enemies", on January 14, 2022. These singles plus all tracks from Chrysalis would appear on band's third studio album, Metamorph, which was released on March 18, 2022.

On July 22, 2022, the band released a single in collaboration with Dreamers titled "Bad Days". Along with the release of the single, the band announced a U.S. tour called "No More Bad Days". The band was scheduled to perform on the Dude Perfect Cruise, although later the information was quietly removed from the website of the cruise, and they did not show up.

=== 2022–2024: Hiatus and Last Legends ===
From the release of "Bad Days" until December 2023, The Score stopped releasing new music as their members began to work with other artists due to internal issues. During tours in 2022, Dover had family situations and the pair called off multiple concerts as a result.

In 2023, Dover started releasing his own songs and collaborating with other artists under the name Edvn, including Zayde Wolf and Sam Tinnesz. After a hiatus, the band released the song "Deep End" on December 1, 2023, marking The Score's first release together in over a year. It was followed by "Survivor" on January 26, 2024, "Down with the Wolves" with 2WEI on March 22, "Power" on May 17, "Don't Need a Hero" on July 12, and "Visions" on September 6, 2024, all of which, except for "Deep End", were included in their fourth studio album, Last Legends.

On January 1, 2024, Ramirez announced that he would be releasing music as part of a new band called Unroyal. Dover was notably absent from this, sparking rumors of a conflict between the two among fans. In April 2024, Dover began releasing music under the name Deane, while continuing to release as Edvn.

On October 4, 2024, the band announced Last Legends, which they released on November 8, 2024, which also included the songs "Fighting For", "Better Days", "Redemption Song", and "Superhuman".

=== 2025-present: Ramirez's and Dover's solo projects and disbandment ===
Following the release of Last Legends in November 2024, the band’s public activity significantly decreased and both members reduced their joint presence on social media. Ramirez and Dover have continued to pursue own their separate projects, Ramirez with Unroyal and Dover with his solo career, throughout 2025 and 2026. On May 26, 2026, The Score released a statement via Instagram announcing their disbandment in order to pursue solo projects.

== Members ==
- Eddie Anthony Ramirez – lead vocals, guitar
- Edan Chai Dover – keys, production, backing vocals

=== Touring members ===
- Chris Coombs – guitar, backing vocals
- Logan Baldwin – drums, percussion

== Discography ==
=== Studio albums ===
Title	Album details	Peak chart positions	
Title	Album details	US Heat	UK Down.
Atlas	Release date: October 13, 2017; Label: Republic Records; Formats: CD, digital download	18	—
Carry On	Release date: August 28, 2020; Label: Republic; Formats: Digital download	—	91
Metamorph	Release date: March 18, 2022; Label: Republic; Formats: Digital download	—	—
Last Legends	Release date: November 8, 2024; Label: Imperial; Formats: Digital download	—	—

=== Extended plays ===
Title	Details	Peak chart positions
Title	Details	UK Ind. Breakers
The Score EP	Released: February 18, 2014; Label: None; Formats: Digital download	18
The Score EP 2	Released: September 23, 2014; Label: None; Formats: Digital download	—
Where Do You Run	Released: September 25, 2015; Label: Republic Records; Formats: Digital download	—
Unstoppable	Released: September 23, 2016; Label: Republic; Formats: Digital download	—
Myths & Legends	Released: April 14, 2017; Label: Republic; Formats: Digital download	—
Stripped	Released: August 11, 2017; Label: Republic; Formats: Digital download	—
Pressure	Released: February 1, 2019; Label: Republic; Formats: Digital download	—
Stay	Released: August 9, 2019; Label: Republic; Formats: Digital download	—
Chrysalis	Released: September 24, 2021; Label: Republic; Formats: Digital download	—

==== Compilation extended plays ====
Title	Details
Chucks Flannels and Fenders	Release: November 27, 2020; Label: Republic; Formats: Digital download
Screaming at the Top of Your Lungs	Release: December 4, 2020; Label: Republic; Formats: Digital download
Set It Off	Release: December 11, 2020; Label: Republic; Formats: Digital download
Breathe You Got This	Release: December 18, 2020; Label: Republic; Formats: Digital download

=== Singles ===
Title	Year	Peak chart position										Certifications	Album
Title	Year	US Adult	US Alt. Dig	US Rock	US Rock Dig	US Rock Alt.	Mex Ing. Air	UK	UK Down.	UK Ind.	UK Sales	Certifications	Album
"Dancing Shoes"	2012	—	—	—	—	—	—	—	—	—	—		The Score EP
"Don't Wanna Wake Up"	2012	—	—	—	—	—	—	—	—	—	—		The Score EP
"Sweet Nothing" (Calvin Harris & Florence Welch cover)	2013	—	—	—	—	—	—	—	—	—	—		Non-album singles
"Not Just Another Way"	2013	—	—	—	—	—	—	—	—	—	—		Non-album singles
"Better than One"	2014	—	—	—	—	—	—	—	—	—	—		The Score EP 2
"Oh My Love"	2015	37	—	—	—	—	26	43	27	2	27	BPI: Silver	Where Do You Run; Atlas (Deluxe)
"Catching Fire"	2015	—	—	—	—	—	—	—	—	—	—		Non-album singles
"White Iverson" (Post Malone cover)	2015	—	—	—	—	—	—	—	—	—	—		Non-album singles
"On and On"	2016	—	—	—	—	—	—	—	—	—	—		Atlas (Deluxe)
"Up"	2016	—	—	—	—	—	—	—	—	—	—		Sing Street (Original Motion Picture Soundtrack)
"Unstoppable"	2016	—	16	24	25	24	—	—	—	—	—	RIAA: Platinum; BPI: Silver	Unstoppable; Atlas
"Revolution"	2017	—	23	50	—	50	—	—	—	—	—		Myths & Legends; Atlas
"Legend"	2017	—	16	36	—	36	—	—	—	—	—	RIAA: Platinum	Myths & Legends; Atlas
"Never Going Back"	2017	—	—	—	—	—	—	—	—	—	—		Atlas
"Miracle"	2017	—	—	—	—	—	—	—	—	—	—		Myths & Legends; Atlas
"Glory"	2018	—	7	—	9	—	—	—	—	—	—		Pressure; Carry On
"Stronger"	2018	—	—	—	—	—	—	—	—	—	—		Pressure; Carry On
"The Fear"	2018	—	23	—	—	—	—	—	—	—	—		Pressure
"Dreamin'" (featuring Blackbear)	2019	—	—	—	—	—	—	—	—	—	—		Pressure
"Stay"	2019	—	—	—	—	—	—	—	—	—	—		Stay
"Bulletproof" (featuring Xylø)	2019	—	—	—	—	—	—	—	—	—	—		Non-album single
"Best Part"	2020	—	—	—	—	—	—	—	—	—	—		Carry On
"The Champion"	2020	—	—	—	—	—	—	—	—	—	—		Carry On
"All of Me" (featuring Travis Barker)	2020	—	—	—	—	—	—	—	—	—	—		Carry On
"Carry On" (with Awolnation)	2020	—	—	—	—	—	—	—	—	—	—		Carry On
"Victorious"	2021	—	—	—	—	—	—	—	—	—	—		Chrysalis; Metamorph
"Head Up"	2021	—	—	—	—	—	—	—	—	—	—		Chrysalis; Metamorph
"Top of the World"	2021	—	—	—	—	—	—	—	—	—	—		Chrysalis; Metamorph
"Alarm"	2021	—	—	—	—	—	—	—	—	—	—		Metamorph
"Big Dreams" (featuring Fitz)	2021	—	—	—	—	—	—	—	—	—	—		Metamorph
"Enemies"	2022	—	—	—	—	—	—	—	—	—	—		Metamorph
"Fighter"	2022	—	—	—	—	—	—	—	—	—	—		Metamorph
"Bad Days" (with Dreamers)	2022	—	—	—	—	—	—	—	—	—	—		Non-album singles
"Deep End"	2023	—	—	—	—	—	—	—	—	—	—		Non-album singles
"Survivor"	2024	—	—	—	—	—	—	—	—	—	—		Last Legends
"Down with the Wolves" (with 2WEI)	2024	—	—	—	—	—	—	—	—	—	—		Last Legends
"Power"	2024	—	—	—	—	—	—	—	—	—	—		Last Legends
"Don't Need a Hero"	2024	—	—	—	—	—	—	—	—	—	—		Last Legends
"Visions"	2024	—	—	—	—	—	—	—	—	—	—		Last Legends
"—" denotes a recording that did not chart or was not released in that territory.

=== Other charted songs ===
Title	Year	Peak chart position		Album
Title	Year	US Rock	US Rock Alt.	Album
"Born for This"	2019	20	20	Pressure; Carry On
"—" denotes a recording that did not chart or was not released in that territory.

=== Music videos ===
Year	Video	Director
2015	"Oh My Love"	Justin Paul Ramirez
2017	"Legend"	Eric Barrett
2017	"Miracle"	Justin Paul Ramirez
2018	"Stronger"	Unknown
2019	"Dreamin'" (featuring Blackbear)	Unknown
2019	"Stay"	Jason Lester
2020	"Best Part"	Collin Duddy, Dean Krupka
2020	"Carry On"	Unknown
2021	"Head Up"	Unknown
2022	"Enemies"	Metaform
2022	"Fighter"	Metaform
