= List of awards and nominations received by Maroon 5 =

Maroon 5 awards and nominations
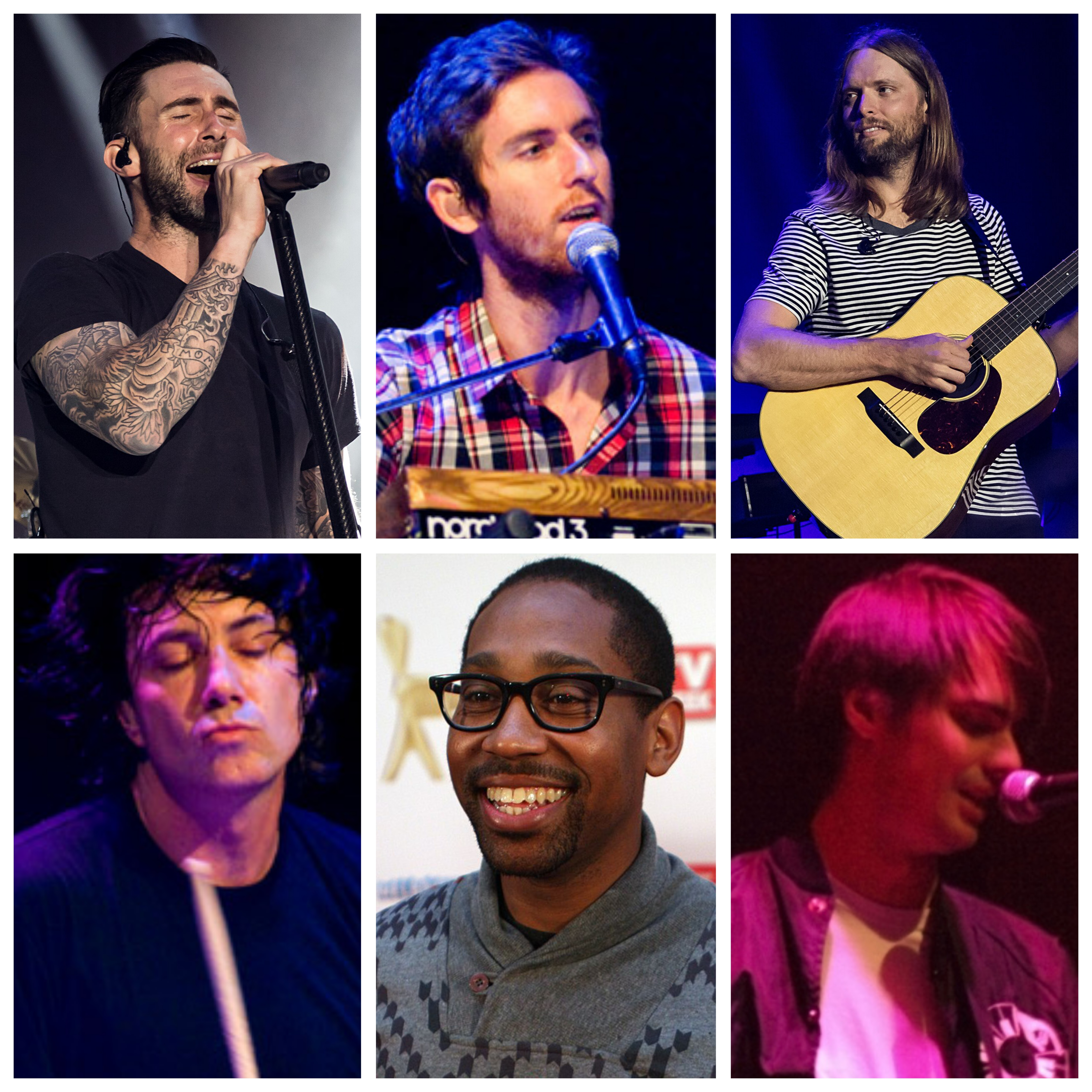
- Lineup of Maroon 5 since 2020
Awards and nominations
Award	Wins	Nominations
American Music Awards	3	15
ASCAP Pop Music Awards	21	0
Billboard Japan Music Awards	1	2
Billboard Music Awards	6	41
BMI Pop Awards	27	0
Bravo Otto	1	2
Grammy Awards	3	13
iHeartRadio Music Awards	2	14
iHeartRadio Titanium Awards	2	2
MTV Europe Music Awards	1	5
MTV Video Music Awards	1	8
Nickelodeon Kids' Choice Awards	1	11
NRJ Music Awards	4	9
People's Choice Awards	3	16
Teen Choice Awards	5	27
World Music Awards	1	11

Totals (Note: Certain award groups do not simply award one winner. They acknowledge several different recipients, have runners-up, and have third place. Since this is a specific recognition and is different from losing an award, runner-up mentions are considered wins in this award tally. For simplification and to avoid errors, each award in this list has been presumed to have had a prior nomination.)
- Wins: 146
- Nominations: 233

Maroon 5 has received several awards and nominations including three Grammy Awards out of 13 nominations; 6 awards out of 40 nominations at the Billboard Music Awards; three American Music Awards; three People's Choice Awards; and an award at the MTV Video Music Awards. The band also received four nominations at the BRIT Awards.

== 4Music Video Honours ==
The 4Music Video Honours is an annual music awards show by 4Music, a music and entertainment channel in the United Kingdom and available on some digital television providers in the Republic of Ireland.

Year	Nominee / work	Award	Result	Ref.
2011	"Moves Like Jagger" (featuring Christina Aguilera)	Best Video	Nominated	

== American Music Awards ==
The American Music Awards are awarded annually by a poll of music buyers. Maroon 5 has received 3 awards from 12 nominations.

Year	Nominee / work	Award	Result
2004	Maroon 5	Favorite Breakthrough Artist	Nominated
2005	Maroon 5	Favorite Adult Contemporary Artist	Nominated
2007	Maroon 5	Favorite Pop/Rock Band/Duo/Group	Nominated
2011	Maroon 5	Favorite Pop/Rock Band/Duo/Group	Won
2012	Maroon 5	Artist of the Year	Nominated
2012	Maroon 5	Favorite Pop/Rock Band/Duo/Group	Won
2012	Overexposed	Favorite Pop/Rock Album	Nominated
2013	Maroon 5	Favorite Adult Contemporary Artist	Won
2015	Maroon 5	Artist of the Year	Nominated
2015	Maroon 5	Favorite Pop/Rock Band/Duo/Group	Nominated
2017	"Don't Wanna Know" (featuring Kendrick Lamar)	Collaboration of the Year	Nominated
2018	Maroon 5	Favorite Pop/Rock Band/Duo/Group	Nominated
2019	Maroon 5	Favorite Adult Contemporary Artist	Nominated
2020	Maroon 5	Favorite Adult Contemporary Artist	Nominated
2020	Maroon 5	Favorite Pop/Rock Band/Duo/Group	Nominated
2021	Maroon 5	Favorite Pop/Duo/Group	Nominated

== APRA Awards ==
Year	Nominee / work	Award	Result
2005	"This Love"	Most Performed Foreign Work	Nominated
2005	"She Will Be Loved"	Most Performed Foreign Work	Nominated
2012	"Moves Like Jagger" (ft. Christina Aguilera)	International Work of the Year	Nominated
2016	"Sugar"	International Work of the Year	Nominated

== ASCAP Pop Music Awards ==
The ASCAP Pop Music Awards is an annual awards ceremony hosted by the American Society of Composers, Authors and Publishers. Maroon 5 has received 23 awards.

Year	Nominee / work	Award	Result	Ref.
2005	"Harder to Breathe"	Most Performed Songs	Won	
2005	"She Will Be Loved"	Most Performed Songs	Won	
2005	"This Love"	Most Performed Songs	Won	
2006	"She Will Be Loved"	Top 5 Most Performed Songs	Won	
2006	"This Love"	Most Performed Songs	Won	
2009	"Wake Up Call"	Most Performed Songs	Won	
2011	"Misery"	Most Performed Songs	Won	
2012	"Moves Like Jagger" (featuring Christina Aguilera)	Most Performed Songs	Won	
2013	"Moves Like Jagger" (featuring Christina Aguilera)	Most Performed Songs	Won	
2013	"One More Night"	Songwriter of the Year	Won	
2013	"Payphone" (featuring Wiz Khalifa)	Most Performed Song	Won	
2014	"Daylight"	Songwriter of the Year	Won	
2014	"One More Night"	Songwriter of the Year	Won	
2015	"Animals"	Most Performed Songs	Won	
2016	"Animals"	Most Performed Songs	Won	
2016	"Sugar"	Most Performed Songs	Won	
2018	"Cold" (featuring Future)	Award Winning Songs	Won	
2018	"Don't Wanna Know" (featuring Kendrick Lamar)	Award Winning Songs	Won	
2018	"What Lovers Do" (featuring SZA)	Award Winning Songs	Won	
2019	"Girls Like You" (featuring Cardi B)	Award Winning Songs	Won	
2019	"Wait"	Award Winning Songs	Won	
2020	"Memories"	Award Winning Songs	Won	
2022	"Beautiful Mistakes" (featuring Megan Thee Stallion)	Winning Songwriters & Publishers	Won	

== Billboard ==
=== Billboard Music Awards ===
The Billboard Music Awards are sponsored by Billboard magazine and are held annually in May (previously December). Maroon 5 have received 6 awards from 41 nominations.

Year	Nominee / work	Award	Result
2004	Maroon 5	Artist of the Year	Nominated
2004	Maroon 5	Digital Artist of the Year	Won
2004	Maroon 5	Duo or Group Artist of the Year	Nominated
2004	Maroon 5	Hot 100 Duo or Group of the Year	Nominated
2004	Maroon 5	Mainstream Top 40 Artist of the Year	Nominated
2004	Maroon 5	Top Billboard 200 Album Duo or Group	Nominated
2004	"This Love"	Hot 100 Single of the Year	Nominated
2004	"This Love"	Mainstream Top 40 Single of the Year	Nominated
2004	"This Love"	Digital Track of the Year	Nominated
2004	"This Love"	Top Hot Adult Top 40 Track	Won
2012	"Moves Like Jagger"	Top 100 Song	Nominated
2012	"Moves Like Jagger"	Top Streaming Song	Nominated
2012	"Moves Like Jagger"	Top Digital Song	Nominated
2012	"Moves Like Jagger"	Top Pop Song	Nominated
2012	Maroon 5	Top Group/Duo	Nominated
2013	Maroon 5	Top Artist	Nominated
2013	Maroon 5	Top 100 Artist	Won
2013	Maroon 5	Top Radio Songs Artist	Nominated
2013	Maroon 5	Top Digital Songs Artist	Nominated
2013	Maroon 5	Top Duo/Group	Nominated
2013	Maroon 5	Top Pop Artist	Nominated
2013	"Payphone"	Top 100 Song	Nominated
2013	"Payphone"	Top Radio Song	Nominated
2013	"Payphone"	Top Pop Song	Nominated
2013	"Payphone"	Top Digital Song	Nominated
2013	"One More Night"	Top 100 Song	Nominated
2013	"One More Night"	Top Radio Song	Nominated
2013	"One More Night"	Top Pop Song	Nominated
2013	Overexposed	Top Pop Album	Nominated
2015	Maroon 5	Top Duo/Group	Nominated
2015	Maroon 5	Top Radio Songs Artist	Nominated
2015	V	Top Billboard 200 Album	Nominated
2016	Maroon 5	Top Duo/Group	Nominated
2019	Maroon 5	Top Duo/Group	Nominated
2019	Maroon 5	Top Radio Songs Artist	Nominated
2019	"Girls Like You" (with Cardi B)	Top Hot 100 Song	Won
2019	"Girls Like You" (with Cardi B)	Top Streaming Song (Video)	Nominated
2019	"Girls Like You" (with Cardi B)	Top Collaboration	Won
2019	"Girls Like You" (with Cardi B)	Top Radio Song	Won
2019	"Girls Like You" (with Cardi B)	Top Selling Song	Won
2020	Maroon 5	Top Duo/Group	Nominated
2021	Maroon 5	Top Duo/Group	Nominated

=== Billboard Japan Music Awards ===
Founded by Billboard Japan, the Billboard Japan Music Awards honor artists, both Japanese and foreign, who had achieved best results in Billboard Japan charts.

Year	Nominee / work	Award	Result	Ref.
2010	"Misery"	Hot 100 Airplay of the Year	Nominated	
2010	"Misery"	Adult Contemporary of the Year	Won	

== BMI ==
=== BMI London Awards ===
Year	Nominee / work	Award	Result	Ref.
2017	"Don't Wanna Know" (with Kendrick Lamar)	Pop Award	Won	
2018	"What Lovers Do"	Pop Award	Won	

=== BMI Pop Awards ===
The BMI Pop Awards are held annually to recognize people in pop culture. Maroon 5 has received 27 awards.

Year	Nominee / work	Award	Result	Ref.
2005	"Harder to Breathe"	Song of the Year	Won	
2005	"This Love"	Pop Award	Won	
2006	"She Will Be Loved"	Song of the Year	Won	
2006	"Sunday Morning"	Songwriter of the Year	Won	
2006	"This Love"	Pop Award	Won	
2008	"Makes Me Wonder"	Award Winning Songs	Won	
2009	"Wake Up Call"	Award Winning Songs	Won	
2009	"Won't Go Home Without You"	Award Winning Songs	Won	
2011	"Misery"	Award Winning Songs	Won	
2012	"Never Gonna Leave This Bed"	Award Winning Songs	Won	
2013	"Moves like Jagger" (with Christina Aguilera)	Award Winning Songs	Won	
2013	"Moves like Jagger" (with Christina Aguilera)	Song of the Year	Won	
2013	"Moves like Jagger" (with Christina Aguilera)	Songwriter of the Year	Won	
2013	"Payphone" (with Wiz Khalifa)	Award Winning Song	Won	
2013	"Payphone" (with Wiz Khalifa)	Songwriter of the Year	Won	
2014	"Daylight"	Award Winning Song	Won	
2014	"Daylight"	Songwriter of the Year	Won	
2014	"Love Somebody"	Award Winning Song	Won	
2014	"Love Somebody"	Songwriter of the Year	Won	
2014	"One More Night"	Award Winning Song	Won	
2014	"One More Night"	Songwriter of the Year	Won	
2015	"Maps"	Award Winning Song	Won	
2015	"Maps"	Songwriter of the Year	Won	
2016	"Animals"	Award Winning Songs	Won	
2016	"Sugar"	Award Winning Songs	Won	
2016	"This Summer's Gonna Hurt like a Motherfucker"	Award Winning Songs	Won	
2018	"Cold" (with Future)	Award Winning Songs	Won	
2018	"Cold" (with Future)	Songwriter of the Year	Won	
2018	"Don't Wanna Know" (with Kendrick Lamar)	Award Winning Songs	Won	
2019	"Girls Like You" (with Cardi B)	Award Winning Songs	Won	
2019	"Wait"	Award Winning Songs	Won	
2019	"What Lovers Do" (with SZA)	Award Winning Songs	Won	
2021	"Memories"	Award Winning Songs	Won	
2022	"Beautiful Mistakes" (with Megan Thee Stallion)	Most Performed Songs of the Year	Won	
2022	"Nobody's Love"	Songwriter of the Year	Won	

== Bravo Otto ==
Established in 1957, the Bravo Otto is an accolade presented by the German magazine Bravo.

Year	Nominee / work	Award	Result	Ref.
2004	Maroon 5	Best Rock Band	Gold	
2020	Maroon 5	Best Band / Duo	Bronze	

== Brit Awards ==
The Brit Awards are held annually and were created by the British Phonographic Industry. Maroon 5 have received 4 nominations.

Year	Nominee / work	Award	Result
2005	Songs About Jane	International Album	Nominated
2005	Maroon 5	International Breakthrough Act	Nominated
2005	Maroon 5	International Group	Nominated
2012	Maroon 5	International Group	Nominated

== BT Digital Music Awards ==
The BT Digital Music Awards are held annually in the United Kingdom. Maroon 5 has won one award.

Year	Nominee / work	Award	Result	Ref.
2011	Coca-Cola Music's 24 Hour Session with Maroon 5	Best Event	Won	

== Canadian Radio Music Awards ==
The Canadian Radio Music Awards is an annual series of awards presented by the Canadian Association of Broadcasters that are part of Canadian Music Week.

Year	Nominee / work	Award	Result
2013	Maroon 5	International Group of the Year	Nominated

== CD Shop Awards ==
Year	Nominee / work	Award	Result
2011	Hands All Over	Western Music Award	Won

== Circle Chart Music Awards ==
The Circle Chart Music Awards is an annual awards show in South Korea presented by the national music record chart, Circle Chart. Maroon 5 has received 4 awards.

Year	Nominee / work	Award	Result	Ref.
2012	"Moves Like Jagger" (with Christina Aguilera)	International Song of the Year	Won	
2013	"Payphone"	International Song of the Year	Won	
2015	"Maps"	International Song of the Year	Won	
2017	"Don't Wanna Know"	International Song of the Year	Won	

== Cyworld Digital Music Awards ==
Year	Nominee / work	Award	Result	Ref.
2011	"Moves Like Jagger" (featuring Christina Aguilera)	International Artist of the Month – July	Won	
2011	"Moves Like Jagger" (featuring Christina Aguilera)	International Artist of the Month – August	Won	
2012	"Moves Like Jagger" (featuring Christina Aguilera)	International Artist of the Month – March	Won	
2012	"Payphone" (featuring Wiz Khalifa)	International Artist of the Month – April	Won	
2012	"One More Night"	International Artist of the Month – July	Won	
2012	"One More Night"	International Artist of the Month – August	Won	
2012	"One More Night"	International Artist of the Month – October	Won	

== Echo Awards ==
The Echo Music Awards are held annually and are granted by the Deutsche Phono-Akademie. Maroon 5 have received 2 nominations.

Year	Nominee / work	Award	Result
2005	Maroon 5	Best International Newcomer	Nominated
2009	Maroon 5	Best International Group (Beste Gruppe International Rock/Pop)	Nominated

== Environmental Media Awards ==
The Environmental Media Awards is an award ceremony which celebrates the entertainment industry's environmental efforts. Maroon 5 has received the Futures Award for a donation green living campaign by Global Cool, with the 2005 Honda Civic Tour.

Year	Nominee / work	Award	Result	Ref.
2006	Maroon 5	EMA Futures Award	Won	

== GAFFA Awards ==
=== GAFFA Awards (Denmark) ===
Delivered since 1991, the GAFFA Awards are a Danish award that rewards popular music by the magazine of the same name.

Year	Nominee / work	Award	Result	Ref.
2004	Maroon 5	Best Foreign New Act	Nominated	
2004	"This Love"	Best Foreign Song	Nominated	
2018	Maroon 5	Best Foreign Band	Nominated	

=== GAFFA Awards (Norway) ===
Maroon 5 has received 1 nomination.

Year	Nominee / work	Award	Result
2018	Girls Like You (featuring Cardi B)	Best Foreign Song	Nominated

== Gaygalan Awards ==
Since 1999, the Gaygalan Awards are a Swedish accolade presented by the QX magazine.

Year	Nominee / work	Award	Result	Ref.
2012	"Moves Like Jagger"	Foreign Song of the Year	Nominated	

== Global Awards ==
The Global Awards celebrate the stars of music, news & entertainment across genres in the UK and from around the world. Maroon 5 has received 3 nominations.

Year	Nominee / work	Award	Result
2019	Maroon 5	Best Group	Nominated
2019	Maroon 5	Mass Appeal Award	Nominated
2020	Maroon 5	Best Group	Nominated

== Grammy Awards ==
The Grammy Awards are awarded annually by the National Academy of Recording Arts and Sciences in the United States. Maroon 5 have received 3 awards and 10 nominations.

Year	Nominee / work	Award	Result
2005	Maroon 5	Best New Artist	Won
2005	"She Will Be Loved"	Best Pop Performance by a Duo or Group with Vocals	Nominated
2006	"This Love" (Live – Friday the 13th)	Best Pop Performance by a Duo or Group with Vocals	Won
2008	"Makes Me Wonder"	Best Pop Performance by a Duo or Group with Vocals	Won
2008	It Won't Be Soon Before Long	Best Pop Vocal Album	Nominated
2009	"Won't Go Home Without You"	Best Pop Performance by a Duo or Group with Vocals	Nominated
2009	"If I Never See Your Face Again" (feat. Rihanna)	Best Pop Collaboration with Vocals	Nominated
2011	"Misery"	Best Pop Performance by a Duo or Group with Vocals	Nominated
2012	"Moves Like Jagger" (with Christina Aguilera)	Best Pop Duo/Group Performance	Nominated
2013	"Payphone" (with Wiz Khalifa)	Best Pop Duo/Group Performance	Nominated
2013	Overexposed	Best Pop Vocal Album	Nominated
2016	"Sugar"	Best Pop Duo/Group Performance	Nominated
2019	"Girls Like You" (with Cardi B)	Best Pop Duo/Group Performance	Nominated

== Groovevolt Music & Fashion Awards ==
Year	Nominee / work	Award	Result	Ref.
2005	"She Will Be Loved"	Best Collaboration, Duo or Group	Won	
2005	"This Love"	Song of the Year	Won	
2005	"This Love"	Video of the Year	Nominated	
2005	Maroon 5	Most Fashionable Artist	Nominated	

== Hito Music Awards ==
Year	Nominee / work	Award	Result	Ref.
2013	"Payphone" (with Wiz Khalifa)	Best Western Songs	Won	
2015	"Maps"	Best Western Songs	Won	
2019	"Girls Like You" (with Cardi B)	Best Western Songs	Won	

== Idolator Music Video Awards ==
Year	Nominee / work	Award	Result	Ref.
2011	"Moves like Jagger" (with Christina Aguilera)	Best Music Video Featuring People; Impersonating Pop Stars	Nominated	
2011	"Moves like Jagger" (with Christina Aguilera)	Best Music Video Somehow Associated with Mick Jagger	Won	

== iHeartRadio ==
=== iHeartRadio Much Music Video Awards ===
The iHeartRadio Much Music Video Awards are awarded annually presented by the Canadian music video channel Much. Maroon 5 has received 6 nominations.

Year	Nominee / work	Award	Result
2005	"She Will Be Loved"	Favorite International Group	Nominated
2008	"Wake Up Call"	Best International Video – Group	Nominated
2012	"Moves Like Jagger"	International Video of the Year – Group	Nominated
2013	"Payphone"	International Video of the Year – Group	Nominated
2014	"Love Somebody"	International Video of the Year – Group	Nominated
2018	Maroon 5	Fan Fave Duo or Group	Nominated

=== iHeartRadio Music Awards ===
The iHeartRadio Music Awards is an international music awards show founded by iHeartRadio in 2014. Maroon 5 has received two awards.

Year	Nominee / work	Award	Result
2014	Maroon 5	Artist of the Year	Nominated
2016	Maroon 5	Best Duo/Group of the Year	Won
2018	Maroon 5	Best Duo/Group of the Year	Won
2018	"Don't Wanna Know" (ft. Kendrick Lamar)	Collaboration of the Year	Nominated
2019	Maroon 5	Best Duo/Group of the Year	Nominated
2019	"Girls Like You" (ft. Cardi B)		
2019	"Girls Like You" (ft. Cardi B)	Song of the Year	Nominated
2019	"Girls Like You" (ft. Cardi B)	Best Lyrics	Nominated
2019	"Girls Like You" (ft. Cardi B)	Best Music Video	Nominated
2019	"Girls Like You" (ft. Cardi B)	Best Collaboration	Nominated
2020	Maroon 5	Best Duo/Group of the Year	Nominated
2021	Maroon 5	Best Duo/Group of the Year	Nominated
2022	Maroon 5	Best Duo/Group of the Year	Nominated
2022	2021 Tour	Favorite Tour Photographer	Nominated
2026	Maroon 5	Duo/Group of the Year	Nominated

=== iHeartRadio Titanium Awards ===
The IHeartRadio Titanium Awards are awarded annually to songs that have received over one billion radio spins in the United States.

Year	Nominee / work	Award	Result	Ref.
2019	"Girls Like You" (ft. Cardi B)	1 Billion Total Audience Spins on iHeartRadio Stations	Won	
2020	"Memories"	1 Billion Total Audience Spins on iHeartRadio Stations	Won	

== International Dance Music Awards ==
Year	Nominee / work	Award	Result	Ref.
2012	"Moves Like Jagger" (with Christina Aguilera)	Best Pop/Dance Track	Nominated	

== Joox Music Awards ==
=== Joox Malaysia Music Awards ===
Year	Nominee / work	Award	Result	Ref.
2020	Maroon 5	Top 5 International Artist of the Year	Won	

=== Joox Thailand Music Awards ===
Year	Nominee / work	Award	Result	Ref.
2022	Maroon 5	Top Social Global Artist of the Year	Nominated	
2022	"Beautiful Mistakes" (featuring Megan Thee Stallion)	International Song of the Year	Nominated	

== Juno Awards ==
The Juno Awards are held annually by the Canadian Academy of Recording Arts and Sciences. Maroon 5 received two nominations.

Year	Nominee / work	Award	Result
2013	Overexposed	International Album of the Year	Nominated
2019	Red Pill Blues	International Album of the Year	Nominated

== LOS40 Music Awards ==
The LOS40 Music Awards, formerly Los Premios 40 Principales, is an annual Spanish awards show that recognises the people and works of pop musicians. Maroon 5 have received six nominations.

Year	Nominee / work	Award	Result
2012	"Moves Like Jagger" (feat. Christina Aguilera)	Best Non-Spanish Language International Song	Nominated
2012	"Payphone" (feat. Wiz Khalifa)	Best International Song	Nominated
2012	Maroon 5	Best Non-Spanish Language International Artist/Group	Nominated
2012	Overexposed	Best Non-Spanish Language International Album	Nominated
2015	Maroon 5	Best International Act	Nominated
2015	V	Best International Album	Nominated

== MAD Video Music Awards ==
The MAD Video Music Awards is an annual awards show that air on the MAD TV (Greece). The awards honor the year's biggest achievements in music, voted by the viewers of Mad television. Winners receive an authentic Mad designed award with the graphics of that year's show. Maroon 5 has been nominated once.

Year	Nominee / work	Award	Result
2015	"Animals"	MAD Radio 106.2 Song of the Year	Nominated

== Melon Music Awards ==
Year	Nominee / work	Award	Result
2012	"Payphone" (ft. Wiz Khalifa)	Best Pop Award	Won
2017	"Don't Wanna Know" (ft. Kendrick Lamar)	Best Pop Award	Nominated

== MP3 Music Awards ==
The MP3 Music Award is an annual awards ceremony established in 2007 to celebrate the most popular artists, bands, MP3 players and MP3 retailers in today's world of music. Maroon 5 has received one nomination.

Year	Nominee / work	Award	Result	Ref.
2011	"Moves Like Jagger" (with Christina Aguilera)	Music Industry Award	Nominated	

== MTV ==
=== MTV Asia Awards ===
The MTV Asia Awards were established in 2002 by MTV Asia. Maroon 5 received one award.

Year	Nominee / work	Award	Result
2005	"She Will Be Loved"	Best Video	Won

=== MTV Australia Awards ===
The MTV Australia Awards were established in 2005 by MTV Australia.

Year	Nominee / work	Award	Result
2005	Maroon 5	Best Breakthrough	Nominated

=== MTV Europe Music Awards ===
The MTV Europe Music Awards were established in 1994 by MTV Europe to celebrate the most popular music videos in Europe. Maroon 5 received one award.

Year	Nominee / work	Award	Result
2004	This Love	Best Song	Nominated
2004	Maroon 5	Best Group	Nominated
2004	Maroon 5	Best New Act	Won
2012	Maroon 5	Best World Stage Performance	Nominated
2018	Maroon 5	Best Group	Nominated

=== MTV Italian Music Awards ===
The MTV Italian Music Awards were established in 2006 by MTV Italy.

Year	Nominee / work	Award	Result	Ref.
2012	"Moves Like Jagger" (with Christina Aguilera)	Best Video	Nominated	

=== MTV Millennial Awards ===
Year	Nominee / work	Award	Result	Ref.
2015	"Sugar"	International Hit of the Year	Nominated	

=== MTV Pilipinas Music Awards ===
The MTV Pilipinas Music Awards were established in 1999 by MTV Pilipinas.

Year	Nominee / work	Award	Result
2004	"This Love"	Favorite International Act	Won

=== MTV Video Music Awards (US) ===
The MTV Video Music Awards were established in 1984 by MTV to celebrate the music videos of the year. Maroon 5 have won 1 award from 8 nominations.

Year	Nominee / work	Award	Result	Ref.
2004	"This Love"	Best New Artist	Won	
2004	"This Love"	Best Group Video	Nominated	
2007	Maroon 5	Best Group	Nominated	
2012	"Payphone" (with Wiz Khalifa)	Best Pop Video	Nominated	
2015	"Sugar"	Best Pop Video	Nominated	
2018	"Wait"	Best Visual Effects	Nominated	
2018	"Girls Like You" (with Cardi B)	Song of Summer	Nominated	
2021	Maroon 5	Group of the Year	Nominated	

=== MTV Video Music Awards Japan ===
The MTV Video Music Awards Japan are held annually since its formation in 2002. Maroon 5 has received 6 nominations.

Year	Nominee / work	Award	Result
2008	"Makes Me Wonder"	Best Group Video	Nominated
2012	"Moves Like Jagger" (feat. Christina Aguilera)	Best Group Video	Nominated
2012	"Moves Like Jagger" (feat. Christina Aguilera)	Best Collaboration	Nominated
2013	"Payphone" (feat. Wiz Khalifa)	Best Group Video	Nominated
2013	"Payphone" (feat. Wiz Khalifa)	Best Collaboration	Nominated
2015	"Sugar"	Best Pop Video – International	Nominated

=== MTV Video Music Awards Latin America ===
The MTV Video Music Awards Latin America are held annually and are broadcast by MTV. Maroon 5 has received 2 awards from 3 nominations.

Year	Nominee / work	Award	Result
2004	Maroon 5	Best New Artist	Won
2004	Maroon 5	Best Rock Artist (International)	Won
2007	Maroon 5	Best Rock Artist (International)	Nominated

=== MTV Video Music Brazil ===
The MTV Video Music Brazil were established in 1995 by MTV Brasil.

Year	Nominee / work	Award	Result
2005	"This Love"	Best International Video	Nominated
2012	Maroon 5	Best International Act	Nominated

=== MTV Video Play Awards ===
Year	Nominee / work	Award	Result	Ref.
2012	"Moves Like Jagger" (featuring Christina Aguilera)	Most-Played Music Video of the Year	Platinum	
2013	"One More Night"	Most-Played Music Video of the Year	Double Platinum	
2013	"Payphone" (featuring Wiz Khalifa)	Most-Played Music Video of the Year	Double Platinum	
2018	"Girls Like You" (featuring Cardi B)	Winning Video	Won	

== Myx Music Awards ==
Myx Music Awards is an annual awards show in the Philippines that honors the year's both Filipino and International Music. Maroon 5 received 3 nominations.

Year	Nominee / work	Award	Result
2012	"Moves Like Jagger" (featuring Christina Aguilera)	Favorite International Video	Nominated
2013	"Payphone" (featuring Wiz Khalifa)	Favorite International Video	Nominated
2019	"Girls Like You" (featuring Cardi B)	International Video of the Year	Nominated

== Nickelodeon Kids' Choice Awards ==
=== Nickelodeon Australian Kids' Choice Awards ===
Maroon 5 has received 1 nomination at the Nickelodeon Australian Kids' Choice Awards.

Year	Nominee / work	Award	Result
2007	Maroon 5	Fave International Band	Nominated

=== Nickelodeon Kids' Choice Awards (US) ===
Maroon 5 has received 12 nominations at the Nickelodeon Kids' Choice Awards, Maroon 5 also has received the most nominations on this category, and they won for the first time in 2019.

Year	Nominee / work	Award	Result
2013	Maroon 5	Favorite Music Group	Nominated
2014	Maroon 5	Favorite Music Group	Nominated
2015	Maroon 5	Favorite Music Group	Nominated
2016	Maroon 5	Favorite Music Group	Nominated
2017	Maroon 5	Favorite Music Group	Nominated
2018	Maroon 5	Favorite Music Group	Nominated
2019	Maroon 5	Favorite Music Group	Won
2019	"Girls Like You" (with Cardi B)	Favorite Collaboration	Nominated
2020	Maroon 5	Favorite Music Group	Nominated
2020	"Memories"	Favorite Song	Nominated
2021	Maroon 5	Favorite Music Group	Nominated
2022	Maroon 5	Favorite Music Group	Nominated
2022	"Beautiful Mistakes" (with Megan Thee Stallion)	Favorite Music Collaboration	Nominated
2024	Maroon 5	Favorite Music Group	Nominated

== NME Awards ==
Maroon 5 has received 1 nomination.

Year	Nominee / work	Award	Result
2005	Maroon 5	Worst Band	Nominated

== Now! Awards ==
Year	Nominee / work	Award	Result	Ref.
2018	"Moves Like Jagger" (with Christina Aguilera)	Song of the Teens	Nominated	

== NRJ Awards ==
=== NRJ Music Awards ===
The NRJ Music Awards are awarded annually by the radio station NJR. Maroon 5 have received 4 awards from 10 nominations.

Year	Nominee / work	Award	Result
2005	Maroon 5	International Revelation of the Year	Won
2005	"This Love"	International Song of the Year	Won
2008	Maroon 5	International Group/Duo of the Year	Nominated
2013	Maroon 5	International Group/Duo of the Year	Nominated
2015	Maroon 5	International Group/Duo of the Year	Won
2015	"Sugar"	Video of the Year	Nominated
2018	Maroon 5	International Group/Duo of the Year	Nominated
2018	"Girls Like You"	International Song of the Year	Won
2018	"Girls Like You"	Video of the Year	Nominated
2021	Maroon 5	International Band/Duo of the Year	Nominated

=== NRJ Radio Awards ===
Maroon 5 has received 2 awards.

Year	Nominee / work	Award	Result
2005	Maroon 5	International Breakout Act	Won
2005	"This Love"	Best International Song	Won

== OFM Music Awards ==
Year	Nominee / work	Award	Result	Ref.
2015	Maroon 5	Best International Group	Won	

== People's Choice Awards ==
The People's Choice Awards are held annually to recognize people in pop culture. Maroon 5 has received 3 awards from 17 nominations.

Year	Nominee / work	Award	Result
2008	Maroon 5	Favorite Group	Nominated
2008	"Makes Me Wonder"	Favorite Rock Song	Nominated
2009	Maroon 5	Favorite Group	Nominated
2011	Maroon 5	Favorite Rock Band	Nominated
2012	Maroon 5	Favorite Band	Won
2012	"Moves Like Jagger" (with Christina Aguilera)	Favorite Song of the Year	Nominated
2013	Maroon 5	Favorite Band	Won
2013	"One More Night"	Favorite Song	Nominated
2013	"Payphone"	Favorite Music Video	Nominated
2013	Overexposed	Favorite Album	Nominated
2014	Maroon 5	Favorite Band	Nominated
2015	Maroon 5	Favorite Group/Band	Won
2015	"Maps"	Favorite Song	Nominated
2016	Maroon 5	Favorite Group/Band	Nominated
2018	Maroon 5	Group of the Year	Longlisted
2018	"Girls Like You" (shared with Cardi B)	Music Video of the Year	Longlisted
2021	Maroon 5	The Group of 2021	Nominated

== People's Telly Awards ==
Year	Nominee / work	Award	Result	Ref.
2010	"Story"	Campaign – Not for Profit	Silver	
2010	"Story"	Music Video	Silver	
2010	"Story"	Editing	Silver	
2010	"Story"	Graphics	Silver	
2010	"Story"	Music Video / Concert	Silver	
2010	"Story"	Videography / Cinematography	Bronze	
2010	"Story"	People's Telly Video	Bronze	

== Pollstar Awards ==
Year	Nominee / work	Award	Result	Ref.
2021	Maroon 5	Touring Artist of the Decade	Nominated	
2022	2021 Tour	Best Pop Tour	Won	

== PopCrush Awards ==
Year	Nominee / work	Award	Result	Ref.
2011	"Moves Like Jagger" (with Christina Aguilera)	Song of the Year	Nominated	

== Premios Juventud ==
Year	Nominee / work	Award	Result	Ref.
2016	Maroon 5	Favorite Hitmaker	Nominated	

== Premios Oye! ==
Year	Nominee / work	Award	Result
2004	Songs About Jane	Main English Breakthrough of the Year	Won
2004	"This Love"	Main English Song of the Year	Won

== Q Awards ==
The Q Awards are the United Kingdom's music awards run by the British magazine, Q. Maroon 5 has received 2 nominations.

Year	Nominee / work	Award	Result
2004	Maroon 5	Best New Act	Nominated
2004	"This Love"	Best Single	Nominated

== Radio Disney Music Awards ==
Year	Nominee / work	Award	Result	Ref.
2004	Maroon 5	Best Group	Nominated	
2013	"Payphone" (featuring Wiz Khalifa)	Best Breakup Song	Nominated	
2015	"Sugar"	So Happy — Best Song That Makes You Smile	Won	
2018	Maroon 5	Best Group	Nominated	

== Radio Music Awards ==
The Radio Music Awards were held annually to award the most successful song on mainstream radio. Maroon 5 has received 2 nominations.

Year	Nominee / work	Award	Result
2005	Maroon 5	Artist of the Year/Adult Hit Radio	Nominated
2005	"She Will Be Loved"	Song of the Year/Adult Hit Radio	Nominated

== Rockbjörnen ==
Year	Nominee / work	Award	Result	Ref.
2005	Maroon 5	Foreign Group of the Year	Won	
2005	"This Love"	Foreign Song of the Year	Won	

== RTHK International Pop Poll Awards ==
The RTHK International Pop Poll Awards are sponsored by RTHK.

Year	Nominee / work	Award	Result	Ref.
2005	Maroon 5	Top Group/Band	Silver	
2005	Maroon 5	Top New Act	Gold	
2005	"She Will Be Loved"	Top 10 International Gold Song	Won	
2008	Maroon 5	Top Group/Band	Gold	
2008	"Makes Me Wonder"	Top 10 International Gold Song	Won	
2009	Maroon 5	Top Group/Band	Bronze	
2011	Maroon 5	Top Group/Band	Bronze	
2011	"Misery"	Top 10 International Gold Song	Won	
2012	Maroon 5	Top Group/Band	Gold	
2012	"Moves Like Jagger" (featuring Christina Aguilera)	Top 10 International Gold Song	Won	
2013	Maroon 5	Top Group/Band	Silver	
2013	"Payphone" (featuring Wiz Khalifa)	Top 10 International Gold Song	Won	
2015	Maroon 5	Top Group/Band	Gold	
2015	"Maps"	Top 10 International Gold Song	Won	
2016	Maroon 5	Top Group/Band	Silver	
2016	"This Summer"	Top 10 International Gold Song	Won	
2018	Maroon 5	Top Group/Band	Gold	
2018	"Wait"	Top 10 International Gold Song	Won	
2019	Maroon 5	Top Group/Band	Silver	
2019	"Girls Like You" (featuring Cardi B)	Top 10 International Gold Song	Won	
2020	Maroon 5	Top Group/Band	Silver	
2020	"Memories"	Top 10 International Gold Song	Won	
2022	Maroon 5	Top Group/Band	Silver	
2022	"Beautiful Mistakes" (featuring Megan Thee Stallion)	Top 10 International Gold Song	Won	

== Shorty ==
=== Shorty Awards ===
Year	Nominee / work	Award	Result	Ref.
2017	"Don't Wanna Know"	Best Use of Tumblr	Nominated	
2018	Red Pill Blues	Best Use of Snapchat	Bronze	
2018	Red Pill Blues	Best Influencer and Celebrity Snapchat Campaign	Bronze	

=== Shorty Social Good Awards ===
Year	Nominee / work	Award	Result	Ref.
2016	#Maroon5Day	Best Influencer & Celebrity Partnership	Nominated	

== Smash Hits Poll Winners Party ==
Year	Nominee / work	Award	Result	Ref.
2004	Maroon 5	Best International Band	Won	

== SOCAN Awards ==
Year	Nominee / work	Award	Result	Ref.
2016	"Sugar"	Pop or Rock Music Award	Won	
2016	"Sugar"	Online Streaming Music Award	Won	

== Teen Choice Awards ==
The Teen Choice Awards are held annually and presented by Fox Broadcasting Company. Maroon 5 has received 5 awards from 14 nominations.

Year	Nominee / work	Award	Result	Ref.
2004	Maroon 5	Choice Breakout Artist	Won	
2004	"This Love"	Choice Rock Track	Won	
2005	Songs About Jane	Choice Music: Album	Nominated	
2005	"She Will Be Loved"	Choice Music: Single	Nominated	
2005	"She Will Be Loved"	Choice Music: Rock Track	Nominated	
2005	"Sunday Morning"	Choice Music: Love Song	Nominated	
2007	Maroon 5	Choice Music: Rock Group	Nominated	
2007	Maroon 5	Choice Summer Music Star	Nominated	
2007	"Makes Me Wonder"	Choice Music: Rock Track	Nominated	
2012	Maroon 5	Choice Summer Music Group	Nominated	
2012	"Moves Like Jagger"	Choice Music: Single by a Group	Nominated	
2012	"Payphone"	Choice Break-Up Song	Won	
2013	Maroon 5	Summer Music Star: Group	Won	
2013	Maroon 5	Choice Music: Group	Nominated	
2013	"Love Somebody"	Choice Music Single: Group	Nominated	
2014	"Maps"	Choice Rock Song	Nominated	
2015	Maroon 5	Choice Music Group: Male	Nominated	
2015	Maroon 5	Choice Summer Music Star: Group	Nominated	
2015	"Sugar"	Choice Song: Group	Nominated	
2015	"Sugar"	Choice Music: Love Song	Nominated	
2017	Maroon 5	Decade Award	Won	
2017	Maroon 5	Choice Music Group	Nominated	
2017	"Don't Wanna Know" (featuring Kendrick Lamar)	Choice Pop Song	Nominated	
2018	Maroon 5	Choice Summer Group	Nominated	
2018	Maroon 5	Choice Music Group	Nominated	
2018	"Wait"	Choice Song: Group	Nominated	
2018	"Girls Like You" (featuring Cardi B)	Choice Summer Song	Nominated	

== The Tylt's Best of the Decade Awards ==
Year	Nominee / work	Award	Result	Ref.
2019	Maroon 5	Pop Band of the Decade	Won	

== The V Chart Awards ==
Year	Nominee / work	Award	Result	Ref.
2016	Maroon 5	Top Group	Nominated	

== Vevo Hot This Year Awards ==
Year	Nominee / work	Award	Result	Ref.
2014	"Maps"	Best Duo or Group Video	Nominated	

== Virgin Media Music Awards ==
Year	Nominee / work	Award	Result	Ref.
2012	"Moves Like Jagger" (with Christina Aguilera)	Best Track	Nominated	
2012	"Moves Like Jagger" (with Christina Aguilera)	Best Collaboration	1st place	
2012	"Moves Like Jagger" (with Christina Aguilera)	Best Video	Nominated	

== Webby Awards ==
A Webby Award is an award for excellence on the Internet presented annually by The International Academy of Digital Arts and Sciences.

Year	Nominee / work	Award	Result	Ref.
2018	Maroon 5.com	Websites and Mobile Stiles Celebrity / Fan – Honoree	Shortlisted	
2019	"Girls Like You"	Music Video (Video) – Honoree	Shortlisted	

== World Music Awards ==
The World Music Awards are held annually that honors worldwide sales figures. Maroon 5 has received 1 award from 11 nominations.

Year	Nominee / work	Award	Result
2004	Maroon 5	World's Best New Group	Won
2005	Maroon 5	World's Best Selling Pop Group	Nominated
2014	Maroon 5	World's Best Group	Nominated
2014	Maroon 5	World's Best Live Act	Nominated
2014	"One More Night"	World's Best Song	Nominated
2014	"One More Night"	World's Best Video	Nominated
2014	"Daylight"	World's Best Song	Nominated
2014	"Daylight"	World's Best Video	Nominated
2014	"Love Somebody"	World's Best Song	Nominated
2014	"Love Somebody"	World's Best Video	Nominated
2014	Overexposed	World's Best Album	Nominated

== Z Awards ==
Year	Nominee / work	Award	Result	Ref.
2011	"Moves Like Jagger" (featuring Christina Aguilera)	Collaboration of the Year	2nd place	
