= The B-Side Collection =

Compilation album by Maroon 5
- Released: December 18, 2007
- Recorded: 2006–2007
- Studio: The Mansion, Los Angeles, California; Conway, Hollywood, California; Glenwood Place; Phantom Studios, West Lake Village, California
- Genre: Pop rock
- Length: 25:17
- Label: A&M Octone
- Producer: Jason Lader; Mike Elizondo; Mark "Spike" Stent; Maroon 5

Maroon 5 chronology
It Won't Be Soon Before Long (2007)	The B-Side Collection (2007)	Call and Response: The Remix Album (2008)

The B-Side Collection is a compilation album by pop rock band Maroon 5, released on December 18, 2007. The album is a compilation of seven songs that were originally only released on single B-sides, or as international or store bought bonuses on the album. The album peaked at number 51 in the U.S. Billboard 200 in its first week of release.

== Background ==
=== Production ===
Maroon 5 recorded over a dozen songs for their second studio album It Won't Be Soon Before Long. After finalizing the final track listing of the album, many songs were left out, including favorites of lead singer Adam Levine. While promoting the album in the United States and Mexico the group decided to release seven of the unreleased tracks to the public. Label A&M/Octone spoke with Levine about releasing a deluxe version of It Won't Be Soon Before Long since sales were positive at that time. The studio had many meetings with iTunes and by the final week of November they decided to release seven tracks cut from It Won't Be Soon Before Long.

=== Release and promotion ===
The album was heavily promoted on the iTunes Store and official Apple website. The entire album was streamed on Apple Inc.'s website, beginning on December 12, 2007, a week before the album's North American release date.

After the main promotion for It Won't Be Soon Before Long and its singles, Maroon 5 released a music video for the track "Story" in 2009. The video was directed by Bob Carmichael and was mainly released to raise awareness for the Harlem Children's Zone. The music video is mainly an animated slideshow of Maroon 5 during the It Won't Be Soon Before Long Tour and its various stops. The video won for the 31st annual of People's Telly Awards in 2010.

== Album performance ==
This is the second album released exclusively on iTunes by Maroon 5, the first one was the Limited Set (iTunes Exclusive) which was removed from the iTunes Store in early 2004. The B-Side Collection has been well received by both critics and fans, the album peaked at number 51 at the Billboard 200 and is a huge success on the iTunes Stores, on its first day of release the album went from number 96 to 6 on the American iTunes Store, and at the Canadian store it went from 56 to 19.

== Track listing ==
The B-Side Collection track listing
No.	Title	Writer(s)	Producer(s)	Length
1.	"Story" (from "Makes Me Wonder" and "Wake Up Call" single)	Levine; Carmichael	Jason Lader; Maroon 5	4:27
2.	"Miss You, Love You" (from "Won't Go Home Without You" single)	Levine; Carmichael	Jason Lader; Maroon 5	3:09
3.	"Until You're Over Me" (from UK, Australia and Japan editions of It Won't Be Soon Before Long)	Levine	Elizondo; Stent; Maroon 5	3:17
4.	"Losing My Mind" (from "Wake Up Call" single)	Levine; Carmichael	Elizondo; Stent; Maroon 5	3:21
5.	"The Way I Was" (from "Makes Me Wonder" single)	Levine	Jason Lader; Maroon 5	4:20
6.	"Figure It Out" (US iTunes bonus track from It Won't Be Soon Before Long)	Levine	Stent; Maroon 5	3:00
7.	"Infatuation" (Bonus track from It Won't Be Soon Before Long)	Levine	Elizondo; Stent; Maroon 5	4:27
Total length:				25:17

== Personnel ==
Credits for The B-Side Collection are adapted from the liner notes for It Won't Be Soon Before Long and its singles.

- Adam Levine - lead vocals, rhythm and lead guitars
- Jesse Carmichael - keyboards, rhythm guitar, backing vocals
- Mickey Madden - bass guitar
- James Valentine - lead and rhythm guitars
- Matt Flynn - drums, percussions

=== Additional Musicians ===
- Eric Gorfain - string arrangement (track 7)
- Lenny Castro - percussion (track 7)
- The Section Quartet - strings (track 7)
- Adam MacDougall - additional keyboards (track 7)

=== Production ===
- Ryan Dusick - Musical Director
- Jason Lader - production, recording, mixing (tracks 1, 2 & 5)
- Mark "Spike" Stent - production, recording (tracks 3, 4, 6 & 7) mixing (tracks 4, 6 & 7)
- Mike Elizondo - production (tracks 3, 4 & 7); drum programming (track 7)
- Mark Endert - mixing (track 3)
- Adam Hawkins - Pro-Tools engineer (tracks 3, 4, 7)
- Eric "Dream" Weaver - assistant engineer (tracks 3 & 7)
- Jay Goin - assistant engineer (tracks 3 & 7)
- Doug Johnson - digital editing (track 3)
- Erik Swanson - digital editing (track 3)
- Alex Dromgoole - assistant mixing engineer (tracks 4 & 7)
- David Emery - assistant mixing engineer (tracks 4 & 7)
- Tony Adams - percussion technician (track 7)
- Ross Garfield - percussion technician (track 7)

== Charts ==
Chart performance for The B-Side Collection
Chart (2007)	Peak position
US Billboard 200	51
