= Maroon 5 videography =

Band videography

Maroon 5 (formerly Kara's Flowers) is an American pop rock band that originated in Los Angeles, California. This is the list of Maroon 5's contributions within video media.

== Music videos ==
=== As lead artist ===
List of music videos, showing year released and director
Title	Year	Director(s)	Notes	Ref.
Kara's Flowers
"Soap Disco"	1997	Mark Kohr		
Maroon 5
"Harder to Breathe"	2002	Marc Webb		
"This Love"	2004	Sophie Muller		
"She Will Be Loved" (Version 1)	2004	None	Unfinished	
"She Will Be Loved" (Version 2)	2004	Sophie Muller		
"Sunday Morning"	2004	Big TV!		
"Must Get Out"	2005	Russell Thomas	Live version	
"Makes Me Wonder"	2007	John Hillcoat		
"Wake Up Call"	2007	Jonas Åkerlund	Original and Director's Cut versions	
"Won't Go Home Without You"	2007	Sophie Muller		
"If I Never See Your Face Again" (featuring Rihanna)	2008	Anthony Mandler		
"Goodnight Goodnight"	2008	Marc Webb		
"Story"	2009	Bob Carmichael	Animated	
"Misery"	2010	Joseph Kahn	Original	
"Misery" (UK version)	2010	Joseph Kahn; Don Tyler	Animated	
"Give a Little More"	2010	Paul Hunter		
"Hands All Over"	2010	Don Tyler	Animated	
"Never Gonna Leave This Bed"	2011	Tim Nackashi		
"Runaway"	2011	Mickey Smith		
"Out of Goodbyes" (featuring Lady Antebellum)	2011	Travis Schneider		
"Moves Like Jagger" (featuring Christina Aguilera)	2011	Jonas Åkerlund	Original, Explicit and Band Edit versions	
"Payphone" (featuring Wiz Khalifa)	2012	Samuel Bayer		
"One More Night"	2012	Peter Berg		
"Daylight"	2012	Jonas Åkerlund	Original	
"Daylight"	2013	Mark Johnson	Playing for Change version	
"Love Somebody"	2013	Rich Lee		
"Maps"	2014	Peter Berg	Original	
"Maps" (Rumba Whoa Remix) (featuring J Balvin)	2014	None		
"Animals"	2014	Samuel Bayer		
"Sugar"	2015	David Dobkin	Original	
"Sugar"	2015	None	Fan Video version	
"This Summer's Gonna Hurt like a Motherfucker"	2015	Travis Schneider; Adam Levine	Original and Clean versions	
"This Summer" (Circuit Jerks Remix)	2015	Kidmograph	Animated	
"Feelings"	2015	None	Unfinished	
"Don't Wanna Know"	2016	David Dobkin		
"Cold" (featuring Future)	2017	Rich Lee		
"What Lovers Do" (featuring SZA)	2017	Joseph Kahn		
"Wait"	2018	Dave Meyers	Original	
"Wait"	2018	Travis Schneider	Snapchat version	
"Girls Like You" (featuring Cardi B)	2018	David Dobkin	Original, Volume 2 and Vertical Video versions	
"Three Little Birds"	2018	Joseph Kahn		
"Memories"	2019	David Dobkin	Original	
"Memories"	2019	Andrew S. Cohen; Ryan Kieffer	Animated	
"Nobody's Love"	2020	David Dobkin		
"Beautiful Mistakes" (featuring Megan Thee Stallion)	2021	Sophie Muller		
"Lost"	2021	Sophie Muller		
"One Light" (Remix) (with Bantu featuring Yung Bleu and Latto)	2022	None	Animated	
"Middle Ground"	2023	David Dobkin		
"Priceless" (featuring Lisa)	2025	Aerin Moreno		
"All Night"	2025	Aerin Moreno		
"California"	2025	None	Animated	
"Love Is Like" (featuring Lil Wayne)	2025	Aerin Moreno		
"Heroine"	2026	Tristan Nash	Animated	

=== Guest appearances ===
Title	Year	Artist(s)	Director(s)	Notes	Ref.
"Uncharted"	2011	Sara Bareilles	Travis Schneider; Javier Dunn	Adam Levine and Jesse Carmichael appeared in the actual video; PJ Morton and James Valentine also appeared in the song's outtakes video.	
"Heavy"	2014	PJ Morton featuring Adam Levine	Orson Whales	With James Valentine playing guitar in the video, as well as Morton's live band, the Crusade.	

== Video albums ==
- Live – Friday the 13th (2005)

== Films and television ==
United States

- Palm Trees & Power Lines (2010)
- Sugar (2018)
- The Voice (2011, 2012, 2013, 2014, 2015, 2016, 2017, 2018, 2021, 2023)
- Victoria's Secret Swim Special (2015)
- Conan
- Saturday Night Live (2004, 2007, 2011, 2012, 2014)
- American Idol
- Beverly Hills, 90210 (as Kara's Flowers) (1997)
- CSI: NY (2008)
- Good Morning America
- Room Raiders (2004)
- Top Chef Masters (2011)
- The Sauce (2007)
- The View (2007)
- The Ellen DeGeneres Show
- The Today Show (2003, 2004, 2005, 2007, 2010, 2011, 2012, 2013, 2014, 2017, 2021, 2025)
- Grammy Awards (2005, 2006, 2008)
- World Music Awards
- American Music Awards (2011)
- iHeartRadio Album Release Party (2014–2021)
- Nickelodeon Kids' Choice Awards (2007)
- Last Call with Carson Daly
- The Late Late Show with Craig Kilborn
- Late Show with David Letterman
- The Late Show with Stephen Colbert (2020–2021)
- Jimmy Kimmel Live!
- The Tonight Show Starring Jimmy Fallon
- The Tonight Show with Jay Leno
- CMT Crossroads (2008) (Maroon 5 with Sara Evans)
- FNMTV (2008)
- MTV Video Music Awards (2014)
- People Magazine Awards (2014)
- MTV TRL
- VH1's Top 20 Countdown (Interviews/Hosting)
- Daily Download
- Billboard Music Awards (2004, 2011, ?)
- Inside Track Live
- MTV ET
- MTV Hard Rock Live
- MTV Europe Awards
- VH1 Big In Awards (2004)
- Jingle Ball Rock
- Kids' Choice Awards (2007)
- New Year's Eve with Carson Daly
- Top Of The Pops
- Diary Of
- Tsunami Aid
- E! (Red Carpet Interviews)
- AFI Tribute to George Lucas
- American Top 40
- Live 8
- ReAct Now Benefit
- Unplugged (Adam Levine with Alicia Keys)
- ESPN Saturday Night Football
- NFL Kickoff
- VH1 I Love The 80's
- VH1 I Love the 80's 3-D
- VH1 I Love The 90's
- Pepsi Smash
- Rove Live
- Today with Des and Mel
- The Sharon Osbourne Show
- The Orlando Jones Show
- MTV Backstage Pass Week
- MTV Cribs (Adam Levine, James Valentine)
- Extra
- The Insider
- TV Guide Channel
- CNN Headline News
- Mad TV

Canada

- Canadian Idol (2007)

South Korea

- Gaon Chart Awards (2012, 2013, 2017)
- MTV Maroon 5 Special(Making the Video + MTV Hits)
- MTV World Stage Maroon 5
- Mnet M Story - 마성의 보컬 애덤 리바인
- MBC News (2014)
- SBS News (2014, 2015)
- JTBC News (2015)
- YTN News (2005, 2014)
- OBS (2015)
- TBC (2015)

France

- Live @ Home (2010)
- Le Grand Journal (2012)
- C à vous (2014)

United Kingdom

- CD:UK
- The Michael Ball Show (2010)
- Live from Studio Five (2010)
- The National Lottery Draws (2010)
- The Voice UK (2012)
- The Graham Norton Show (2014)
- Sunday Night at the Palladium (2014)
- The X Factor (2014)
- Alan Carr: Chatty Man (2015)

Japan

- Music Station
- Sukkiri!! (2014)
- SMAP×SMAP (2014)

Germany

- Guinness World Records – Die größten Weltrekorde (2007)
- Germany's Next Top Model (2012)
- Schlag den Raab (2014)

== Commercials ==
=== Appearance ===
- Worldwide – Hyundai Motors (2018–present)
- United States – JBL (2011–present)
- United States – Snapple (2011)
- United States – Nissan (2014)

=== Music ===
- United States – The CW (2008)
- Japan – Toyota
- United States – JBL (2011–present)
- South Korea – GM Chevrolet Malibu (2012)
- Worldwide – Samsung Galaxy Note series (2011–2012)
- South Korea – Hyundai Motors Sonata Hybrid (2013)
- United States – Kia Motors Soul (2014)
- United States – Nissan (2014)
- South Korea – Shinhan Card (2015)
- Thailand – Toyota Corolla Altis (2015–2016)
- Germany – Audi Q7 (2016)
