= Grammy Nominees =

Artist compilation albums

The Grammy Nominees was a series of various artists compilation albums, released from 1995–2020, celebrating the best of the music industry. Albums were released before the airing of the annual Grammy Awards. All of the songs on the albums were Grammy nominated in the year released. Other Grammy series albums were briefly issued for rap nominees (1999–2001) and Latin nominees (1998–2005).

Each regular album from 1995 through to the 2007 edition was certified Gold by the Recording Industry Association of America (RIAA), while the 1996 and 2000 editions were certified Platinum. After 25 years, the release of Grammy compilation CDs was stopped due to the declining interest and sales of physical media.

== 1995 ==
1995 Grammy Nominees is the first edition of the long-running series and covered the top contenders for the 37th Annual Grammy Awards. Released on February 7, 1995, it entered at number twenty-six on the Billboard 200 chart.

1995 Grammy Nominees

Compilation album by various artists
- Released: February 7, 1995
- Genre: Pop
- Length: 62:53
- Label: Sony

Professional ratings
Review scores
Source	Rating
AllMusic	3/5 stars

No.	Title	Music	Album	Length
1.	"I'll Make Love to You"	Boyz II Men	II	3:58
2.	"He Thinks He'll Keep Her"	Mary Chapin Carpenter	Come On Come On	4:02
3.	"All I Wanna Do"	Sheryl Crow	Tuesday Night Music Club	4:32
4.	"Love Sneakin' Up On You"	Bonnie Raitt	Longing in Their Hearts	3:38
5.	"Streets of Philadelphia"	Bruce Springsteen	Philadelphia Official Soundtrack	3:52
6.	"Said I Loved You...But I Lied"	Michael Bolton	The One Thing	5:05
7.	"Can You Feel the Love Tonight"	Elton John	The Lion King: Original Motion Picture Soundtrack	3:59
8.	"Prayer for the Dying"	Seal	Seal	5:30
9.	"Love the One You're With"	Luther Vandross	Songs	5:03
10.	"Hero"	Mariah Carey	Music Box	4:17
11.	"The Power of Love"	Celine Dion	The Colour of My Love	5:41
12.	"Longing in Their Hearts"	Bonnie Raitt	Longing in Their Hearts	4:48
13.	"Ordinary Miracles"	Barbra Streisand	Barbra: The Concert	3:56

== 1996 ==
1996 Grammy Nominees covers the top contenders for the 38th Annual Grammy Awards, and became the series' first top 20 chart entry, peaking at number sixteen on the Billboard 200 chart.

1996 Grammy Nominees

Compilation album by various Artists
- Released: February 6, 1996
- Genre: Pop
- Length: 48:44
- Label: Sony

Professional ratings
Review scores
Source	Rating
AllMusic	3/5 stars

No.	Title	Music	Album	Length
1.	"One Sweet Day"	Mariah Carey and Boyz II Men	Daydream	4:43
2.	"Gangsta's Paradise"	Coolio featuring L.V.	Dangerous Minds	4:02
3.	"One of Us"	Joan Osborne	Relish	5:22
4.	"Kiss from a Rose"	Seal	Seal	3:38
5.	"Waterfalls"	TLC	CrazySexyCool	3:32
6.	"I Can Love You Like That"	All-4-One	And the Music Speaks	4:24
7.	"You Are Not Alone"	Michael Jackson	HIStory: Past, Present and Future, Book I	5:47
8.	"You Oughta Know"	Alanis Morissette	Jagged Little Pill	4:08
9.	"Baby"	Brandy	Brandy	5:15
10.	"Let Her Cry"	Hootie & the Blowfish	Cracked Rear View	5:08
11.	"Any Man of Mine"	Shania Twain	The Woman in Me	4:05

== 1997 ==
1997 Grammy Nominees covers the top contenders for the 39th Annual Grammy Awards, and did two better than its predecessor in the series, hitting number fourteen on the Billboard 200 chart.

1997 Grammy Nominees

Compilation album by various artists
- Released: February 11, 1997
- Genre: Pop
- Length: 54:41
- Label: Polygram

Professional ratings
Review scores
Source	Rating
AllMusic	3/5 stars

No.	Title	Music	Album	Length
1.	"Give Me One Reason"	Tracy Chapman	New Beginning	4:29
2.	"Change the World"	Eric Clapton	Phenomenon (soundtrack)	3:55
3.	"Because You Loved Me"	Celine Dion	Falling into You	4:35
4.	"Ironic"	Alanis Morissette	Jagged Little Pill	3:49
5.	"1979"	The Smashing Pumpkins	Mellon Collie and the Infinite Sadness	4:25
6.	"Stupid Girl"	Garbage	Garbage	4:21
7.	"Who Will Save Your Soul"	Jewel	Pieces of You	4:01
8.	"Spiderwebs"	No Doubt	Tragic Kingdom	4:28
9.	"Nobody Knows"	The Tony Rich Project	Words	5:09
10.	"My Baby"	LeAnn Rimes	Blue	2:51
11.	"Un-Break My Heart"	Toni Braxton	Secrets	4:32
12.	"Get Out of This House"	Shawn Colvin	A Few Small Repairs	4:17
13.	"Reach"	Gloria Estefan	Destiny	3:49

== 1998 ==
1998 Grammy Nominees covers the top contenders for the 40th Annual Grammy Awards and just missed hitting the top 10 of the Billboard 200 chart, peaking at number eleven.

1998 Grammy Nominees

Compilation album by various artists
- Released: February 10, 1998
- Genre: Pop
- Length: 52:53
- Label: MCA

Professional ratings
Review scores
Source	Rating
AllMusic	3/5 stars

No.	Title	Music	Album	Length
1.	"Where Have All the Cowboys Gone?"	Paula Cole	This Fire	4:28
2.	"Sunny Came Home"	Shawn Colvin	A Few Small Repairs	4:26
3.	"Everyday Is a Winding Road"	Sheryl Crow	Sheryl Crow	4:18
4.	"MMMBop"	Hanson	Middle of Nowhere	4:28
5.	"I Believe I Can Fly"	R. Kelly	Space Jam: Music from and Inspired by the Motion Picture	5:22
6.	"Criminal"	Fiona Apple	Tidal	5:43
7.	"On & On"	Erykah Badu	Baduizm	3:48
8.	"Silver Springs"	Fleetwood Mac	The Dance	5:43
9.	"Virtual Insanity"	Jamiroquai	Travelling without Moving	5:42
10.	"Don't Speak"	No Doubt	Tragic Kingdom	4:24
11.	"Anybody Seen My Baby?"	The Rolling Stones	Bridges to Babylon	4:31

== 1999 ==
1999 Grammy Nominees covers the top contenders for the 41st Annual Grammy Awards, and became the series' first top 10 entry on the Billboard 200, peaking at number eight.

1999 Grammy Nominees

Compilation album by various artists
- Released: February 9, 1999
- Genre: Pop
- Length: 71:09
- Label: Elektra

Professional ratings
Review scores
Source	Rating
AllMusic	3/5 stars

No.	Title	Music	Album	Length
1.	"The Boy Is Mine"	Brandy and Monica	Never Say Never, The Boy Is Mine	4:56
2.	"My Heart Will Go On"	Celine Dion	Let's Talk About Love	4:41
3.	"Iris"	Goo Goo Dolls	City of Angels: Music from the Motion Picture	4:52
4.	"Ray of Light"	Madonna	Ray of Light	5:21
5.	"You're Still the One"	Shania Twain	Come on Over	3:35
6.	"Everybody (Backstreet's Back)"	Backstreet Boys	Backstreet Boys	4:48
7.	"Amor Ti Vieta"	Andrea Bocelli	Aria: The Opera Album	1:50
8.	"Wide Open Spaces"	Dixie Chicks	Wide Open Spaces	3:45
9.	"Doo Wop (That Thing)"	Lauryn Hill	The Miseducation of Lauryn Hill	4:03
10.	"Torn"	Natalie Imbruglia	Left of the Middle	4:06
11.	"Save Tonight"	Eagle-Eye Cherry	Desireless	3:59
12.	"My Father's Eyes"	Eric Clapton	Pilgrim	5:23
13.	"Anytime"	Brian McKnight	Anytime	4:33
14.	"Lullaby"	Shawn Mullins	Soul's Core	5:30
15.	"You Were Meant for Me"	Sting	The Object of My Affection	4:12

== 2000 ==
Grammy Nominees 2000 covers the top contenders for the 42nd Annual Grammy Awards. It became the series' second top ten entry on the Billboard 200 chart, peaking at number nine.

Grammy Nominees 2000

Compilation album by various artists
- Released: February 8, 2000
- Genre: Pop
- Length: 54:06
- Label: RCA

Professional ratings
Review scores
Source	Rating
AllMusic	3/5 stars

No.	Title	Music	Album	Length
1.	"I Want It That Way"	Backstreet Boys	Millennium	3:34
2.	"Livin' la Vida Loca"	Ricky Martin	Ricky Martin	4:03
3.	"Smooth"	Santana featuring Rob Thomas	Supernatural	4:00
4.	"No Scrubs"	TLC	Fanmail	3:35
5.	"Genie in a Bottle"	Christina Aguilera	Christina Aguilera	3:37
6.	"Do Something"	Macy Gray	On How Life Is	4:59
7.	"Bawitdaba"	Kid Rock	Devil Without a Cause	4:26
8.	"...Baby One More Time"	Britney Spears	...Baby One More Time	3:31
9.	"It Hurt So Bad"	Susan Tedeschi	Just Won't Burn	4:48
10.	"I Need to Know"	Marc Anthony	Marc Anthony	3:48
11.	"Mambo No. 5 (A Little Bit Of...)"	Lou Bega	A Little Bit of Mambo	4:41
12.	"Sogno"	Andrea Bocelli	Sogno	4:03
13.	"Brand New Day"	Sting	Brand New Day	6:20

=== Year-end charts ===
Year-end chart performance for Grammy Nominees 2000
Chart (2000)	Position
South Korean International Albums (MIAK)	29

=== Certifications and sales ===
Region	Certification	Certified units/sales
Singapore	—	10,100
South Korea	—	73,451
United States (RIAA)	Platinum	1,000,000^{^}
^{^} Shipments figures based on certification alone.

== 2001 ==
Grammy Nominees 2001 covers the top contenders for the 43rd Annual Grammy Awards. Unlike its two predecessors in the series, it failed to reach the top 10 of the Billboard 200 chart, instead only peaking at number twelve.

Grammy Nominees 2001

Compilation album by various artists
- Released: February 6, 2001
- Genre: Pop
- Length: 72:29
- Label: Capitol

Professional ratings
Review scores
Source	Rating
AllMusic	3/5 stars

No.	Title	Music	Album	Length
1.	"Say My Name"	Destiny's Child	The Writing's on the Wall	4:30
2.	"I Try"	Macy Gray	On How Life Is	3:58
3.	"Music"	Madonna	Music	3:45
4.	"Bye Bye Bye"	*NSYNC	No Strings Attached	3:21
5.	"Beautiful Day"	U2	All That You Can't Leave Behind	4:08
6.	"Sexx Laws"	Beck	Midnite Vultures	3:38
7.	"The Real Slim Shady"	Eminem	The Marshall Mathers LP	4:45
8.	"Optimistic"	Radiohead	Kid A	4:54
9.	"You're the One"	Paul Simon	You're the One	4:59
10.	"Cousin Dupree"	Steely Dan	Two Against Nature	5:27
11.	"What a Girl Wants"	Christina Aguilera	Christina Aguilera	3:34
12.	"Save Me"	Aimee Mann	Magnolia: Music from the Motion Picture	4:34
13.	"Both Sides Now"	Joni Mitchell	Both Sides Now	5:47
14.	"Oops!... I Did It Again"	Britney Spears	Oops!... I Did It Again	3:31
15.	"Show Me the Meaning of Being Lonely"	Backstreet Boys	Millennium	3:55
16.	"Pinch Me"	Barenaked Ladies	Maroon	4:45
17.	"Breathless"	The Corrs	In Blue	3:28

== 2002 ==
Grammy Nominees 2002 covers the top contenders for the 44th Annual Grammy Awards, and, like the 2001 edition, peaked outside the top ten on the Billboard 200 chart, peaking at number thirteen.

Grammy Nominees 2002

Compilation album by various artists
- Released: February 5, 2002
- Genre: Pop
- Length: 73:00
- Label: UTV Records

Professional ratings
Review scores
Source	Rating
AllMusic	4/5 stars

No.	Title	Music	Album	Length
1.	"Video"	India Arie	Acoustic Soul	4:07
2.	"Fallin'"	Alicia Keys	Songs in A Minor	3:30
3.	"Ms. Jackson"	OutKast	Stankonia	3:59
4.	"Drops of Jupiter (Tell Me)"	Train	Drops of Jupiter	4:19
5.	"Walk On"	U2	All That You Can't Leave Behind	4:55
6.	"Honest with Me"	Bob Dylan	Love and Theft	5:47
7.	"I Am a Man of Constant Sorrow"	The Soggy Bottom Boys	O Brother, Where Art Thou?	3:10
8.	"I'm Like a Bird"	Nelly Furtado	Whoa, Nelly!	4:04
9.	"Babylon"	David Gray	White Ladder	4:46
10.	"Fill Me In"	Craig David	Born to Do It	4:15
11.	"You Rock My World"	Michael Jackson	Invincible	5:07
12.	"I Want Love"	Elton John	Songs from the West Coast	4:35
13.	"Still"	Brian McKnight	Superhero	4:19
14.	"Don't Let Me Be Lonely Tonight"	James Taylor	Nearness Of You: The Ballad Book	4:41
15.	"Shape of My Heart"	Backstreet Boys	Black & Blue	3:50
16.	"Superman (It's Not Easy)"	Five for Fighting	America Town	3:40
17.	"Imitation of Life"	R.E.M.	Reveal	3:56

== 2003 ==
Grammy Nominees 2003 covers the top contenders for the 45th Annual Grammy Awards, and returned the series to the top 10 of the Billboard 200 chart, peaking at number six.

Grammy Nominees 2003

Compilation album by various artists
- Released: February 11, 2003
- Genre: Pop
- Length: 71:14
- Label: Warner Bros.

Professional ratings
Review scores
Source	Rating
AllMusic	3/5 stars

No.	Title	Music	Album	Length
1.	"A Thousand Miles"	Vanessa Carlton	Be Not Nobody	3:58
2.	"Don't Know Why"	Norah Jones	Come Away with Me	3:06
3.	"How You Remind Me"	Nickelback	Silver Side Up	3:44
4.	"Landslide"	Dixie Chicks	Home	3:48
5.	"Without Me"	Eminem	The Eminem Show	4:23
6.	"Hot in Herre"	Nelly	Nellyville	3:50
7.	"Foolish"	Ashanti	Ashanti	3:49
8.	"All You Wanted"	Michelle Branch	The Spirit Room	3:37
9.	"Complicated"	Avril Lavigne	Let Go	4:04
10.	"Your Body Is a Wonderland"	John Mayer	Room for Squares	3:46
11.	"Soak Up the Sun"	Sheryl Crow	C'mon, C'mon	3:18
12.	"Get the Party Started"	P!nk	Missundaztood	3:12
13.	"Overprotected"	Britney Spears	Britney	3:19
14.	"7 Days"	Craig David	Born to Do It	3:54
15.	"Fragile"	Sting	...All This Time	4:21
16.	"October Road"	James Taylor	October Road	3:57
17.	"Girl All the Bad Guys Want"	Bowling for Soup	Drunk Enough to Dance	3:18
18.	"Where Are You Going"	Dave Matthews Band	Busted Stuff	3:51
19.	"Girlfriend"	*NSYNC	Celebrity	3:59

== 2004 ==
2004 Grammy Nominees covers the top contenders for the 46th Annual Grammy Awards, and debuted at number four on the Billboard 200 chart, becoming, at that point, the series' highest-charting volume.

2004 Grammy Nominees

Compilation album by various artists
- Released: January 20, 2004
- Genre: Pop
- Length: 79:23
- Label: BMG

Professional ratings
Review scores
Source	Rating
AllMusic	3/5 stars

No.	Title	Music	Album	Length
1.	"Crazy in Love"	Beyoncé featuring Jay-Z	Dangerously in Love	3:44
2.	"Where Is the Love"	The Black Eyed Peas and Justin Timberlake	Elephunk	4:05
3.	"Clocks"	Coldplay	A Rush of Blood to the Head	4:11
4.	"Lose Yourself"	Eminem	8 Mile: Music from and Inspired by the Motion Picture	4:25
5.	"Work It"	Missy "Misdemeanor" Elliott	Under Construction	4:22
6.	"Going Under"	Evanescence	Fallen	3:33
7.	"The Way You Move"	OutKast featuring Sleepy Brown	Speakerboxxx/The Love Below	3:24
8.	"Cry Me a River"	Justin Timberlake	Justified	4:29
9.	"Beautiful"	Christina Aguilera	Stripped	3:58
10.	"I'm with You"	Avril Lavigne	Let Go	3:42
11.	"Dance with My Father"	Luther Vandross	Dance with My Father	4:26
12.	"Keep Me in Your Heart"	Warren Zevon	The Wind	3:02
13.	"In da Club"	50 Cent	Get Rich or Die Tryin'	3:14
14.	"Stacy's Mom"	Fountains of Wayne	Welcome Interstate Managers	3:17
15.	"I Wish I Wasn't"	Heather Headley	This Is Who I Am	4:17
16.	"Gimme the Light"	Sean Paul	Dutty Rock	3:14
17.	"Any Road"	George Harrison	Brainwashed	3:50
18.	"Ain't No Mountain High Enough"	Michael McDonald	Motown	2:50
19.	"Send Your Love"	Sting	Sacred Love	3:33
20.	"Hole in the World"	Eagles	The Very Best of the Eagles	3:58
21.	"Unwell"	Matchbox Twenty	More Than You Think You Are	3:49

== 2005 ==
2005 Grammy Nominees covers the top contenders for the 47th Annual Grammy Awards, and matched the series' best chart peak of number four on the Billboard 200 chart.

2005 Grammy Nominees

Compilation album by various artists
- Released: January 25, 2005
- Genre: Pop
- Length: 79:41
- Label: Capitol

Professional ratings
Review scores
Source	Rating
AllMusic	2.5/5 stars

No.	Title	Music	Album	Length
1.	"Let's Get It Started"	The Black Eyed Peas	Elephunk	3:38
2.	"Here We Go Again"	Ray Charles with Norah Jones	Genius Loves Company	3:56
3.	"American Idiot"	Green Day	American Idiot	2:56
4.	"Heaven"	Los Lonely Boys	Los Lonely Boys	3:36
5.	"If I Ain't Got You"	Alicia Keys	The Diary of Alicia Keys	3:49
6.	"Burn"	Usher	Confessions	3:49
7.	"Through the Wire"	Kanye West	The College Dropout	3:41
8.	"She Will Be Loved"	Maroon 5	Songs About Jane	4:02
9.	"You Had Me"	Joss Stone	Mind Body & Soul	3:59
10.	"Redneck Woman"	Gretchen Wilson	Here for the Party	3:41
11.	"The First Cut Is the Deepest"	Sheryl Crow	The Very Best of Sheryl Crow	3:46
12.	"Sunrise"	Norah Jones	Feels like Home	3:19
13.	"You Raise Me Up"	Josh Groban	Closer	4:01
14.	"Daughters"	John Mayer	Heavier Things	3:58
15.	"Cinnamon Girl"	Prince	Musicology	3:57
16.	"Love's Divine"	Seal	Seal IV	4:05
17.	"My Immortal"	Evanescence	Fallen	4:33
18.	"Good Vibrations"	Brian Wilson	Smile	4:36
19.	"Monkey to Man"	Elvis Costello & The Imposters	The Delivery Man	3:56
20.	"Vertigo"	U2	How to Dismantle an Atomic Bomb	3:12
21.	"Ch-Check It Out"	Beastie Boys	To the 5 Boroughs	3:11

== 2006 ==
2006 Grammy Nominees covers the top contenders for the 48th Annual Grammy Awards. It failed to reach the top 10 of the Billboard 200 chart, instead peaking at number 14.

2006 Grammy Nominees

Compilation album by various artists
- Released: January 24, 2006
- Genre: Pop
- Length: 79:45
- Label: Sony BMG

Professional ratings
Review scores
Source	Rating
AllMusic	2.5/5 stars

No.	Title	Music	Album	Length
1.	"Feel Good Inc."	Gorillaz featuring De La Soul	Demon Days	3:28
2.	"Boulevard of Broken Dreams"	Green Day	American Idiot	4:21
3.	"It's Like That"	Mariah Carey	The Emancipation of Mimi	3:23
4.	"Fine Line"	Paul McCartney	Chaos and Creation in the Backyard	3:06
5.	"City of Blinding Lights"	U2	How to Dismantle an Atomic Bomb	4:13
6.	"Bless the Broken Road"	Rascal Flatts	Feels Like Today	3:42
7.	"Devils & Dust"	Bruce Springsteen	Devils & Dust	4:51
8.	"Ordinary People"	John Legend	Get Lifted	4:33
9.	"Sitting, Waiting, Wishing"	Jack Johnson	In Between Dreams	3:00
10.	"Walk On By"	Seal	Best 1991–2004	3:13
11.	"Lonely No More"	Rob Thomas	...Something to Be	3:46
12.	"From the Bottom of My Heart"	Stevie Wonder	A Time to Love	3:55
13.	"Since U Been Gone"	Kelly Clarkson	Breakaway	3:08
14.	"Good Is Good"	Sheryl Crow	Wildflower	4:13
15.	"Speed of Sound"	Coldplay	X&Y	4:21
16.	"Best of You"	Foo Fighters	In Your Honor	4:16
17.	"Rain Fall Down"	The Rolling Stones	A Bigger Bang	3:57
18.	"The Painter"	Neil Young	Prairie Wind	4:00
19.	"E-Pro"	Beck	Guero	3:19
20.	"Soul Meets Body"	Death Cab for Cutie	Plans	3:26
21.	"Do You Want To"	Franz Ferdinand	You Could Have It So Much Better	3:34

== 2007 ==
Grammy Nominees 2007 covers the top contenders for the 49th Annual Grammy Awards, and is, thus far, the highest-charting album in the series, debuting at number three on the Billboard 200 chart.

2007 Grammy Nominees

Compilation album by various artists
- Released: January 23, 2007
- Genre: Pop
- Length: 78:55
- Label: Sony BMG

Professional ratings
Review scores
Source	Rating
AllMusic	4/5 stars

No.	Title	Music	Album	Length
1.	"Crazy"	Gnarls Barkley	St. Elsewhere	2:51
2.	"Be Without You"	Mary J. Blige	The Breakthrough	3:52
3.	"Put Your Records On"	Corinne Bailey Rae	Corinne Bailey Rae	3:33
4.	"Waiting on the World to Change"	John Mayer	Continuum	3:19
5.	"Dani California"	Red Hot Chili Peppers	Stadium Arcadium	4:40
6.	"SexyBack"	Justin Timberlake	FutureSex/LoveSounds	3:48
7.	"Not Ready to Make Nice"	Dixie Chicks	Taking the Long Way	3:54
8.	"Jesus, Take the Wheel"	Carrie Underwood	Some Hearts	3:44
9.	"Hide and Seek"	Imogen Heap	Speak for Yourself	2:57
10.	"Ain't No Other Man"	Christina Aguilera	Back to Basics	3:47
11.	"Unwritten"	Natasha Bedingfield	Unwritten	3:50
12.	"You Can Close Your Eyes"	Sheryl Crow	Artist's Choice: Sheryl Crow	2:07
13.	"Stupid Girls"	P!nk	I'm Not Dead	3:14
14.	"Black Horse and the Cherry Tree"	KT Tunstall	Eye to the Telescope	2:51
15.	"You're Beautiful"	James Blunt	Back to Bedlam	3:20
16.	"Save Room"	John Legend	Once Again	3:42
17.	"Jenny Wren"	Paul McCartney	Chaos and Creation in the Backyard	2:08
18.	"Bad Day"	Daniel Powter	Daniel Powter	3:53
19.	"My Humps"	The Black Eyed Peas	Monkey Business	3:44
20.	"I Will Follow You into the Dark"	Death Cab for Cutie	Plans	3:09
21.	"Over My Head (Cable Car)"	The Fray	How to Save a Life	3:55
22.	"Is It Any Wonder?"	Keane	Under the Iron Sea	3:02
23.	"Stickwitu"	The Pussycat Dolls	PCD	3:28

== 2008 ==
Grammy Nominees 2008 covers the top contenders for the 50th Annual Grammy Awards, and debuted at number four on the Billboard 200 chart.

2008 Grammy Nominees

Compilation album by various artists
- Released: January 29, 2008
- Genre: Pop
- Length: 79:49
- Label: UM^{e}

Professional ratings
Review scores
Source	Rating
AllMusic	2.5/5 stars

No.	Title	Music	Album	Length
1.	"What Goes Around.../...Comes Around"	Justin Timberlake	FutureSex/LoveSounds	5:11
2.	"Rehab"	Amy Winehouse	Back to Black	3:33
3.	"Irreplaceable"	Beyoncé	B'Day	3:46
4.	"The Pretender"	Foo Fighters	Echoes, Silence, Patience & Grace	4:27
5.	"Makes Me Wonder"	Maroon 5	It Won't Be Soon Before Long	3:31
6.	"1234"	Feist	The Reminder	3:08
7.	"(You Want To) Make a Memory"	Bon Jovi	Lost Highway	4:04
8.	"Dance Tonight"	Paul McCartney	Memory Almost Full	2:52
9.	"Candyman"	Christina Aguilera	Back to Basics	3:13
10.	"Say It Right"	Nelly Furtado	Loose	3:41
11.	"Good Life"	Kanye West featuring T-Pain	Graduation	3:28
12.	"River"	Herbie Hancock featuring Corinne Bailey Rae	River: The Joni Letters	5:02
13.	"What You Give Away"	Vince Gill with Sheryl Crow	These Days	3:50
14.	"Before He Cheats"	Carrie Underwood	Some Hearts	3:17
15.	"Hey There Delilah"	Plain White T's	Every Second Counts	3:46
16.	"Like a Star"	Corinne Bailey Rae	Corinne Bailey Rae	3:58
17.	"Working Class Hero"	Green Day	Instant Karma: The Amnesty International Campaign to Save Darfur	4:01
18.	"It's Not Over"	Daughtry	Daughtry	3:31
19.	"If Everyone Cared"	Nickelback	All the Right Reasons	3:35
20.	"Icky Thump"	The White Stripes	Icky Thump	3:46
21.	"Instant Karma!"	U2	Instant Karma: The Amnesty International Campaign to Save Darfur	3:09

== 2009 ==
Grammy Nominees 2009 covers the top contenders for the 51st Annual Grammy Awards and debuted at number six on the Billboard 200 chart.

2009 Grammy Nominees

Compilation album by various artists
- Released: January 27, 2009
- Genre: Pop
- Length: 78:53
- Label: Rhino

Professional ratings
Review scores
Source	Rating
AllMusic	3/5 stars

No.	Title	Music	Album	Length
1.	"Viva la Vida"	Coldplay	Viva la Vida or Death and All His Friends	3:44
2.	"American Boy"	Estelle featuring Kanye West	Shine	4:02
3.	"Love Song"	Sara Bareilles	Little Voice	3:53
4.	"Closer"	Ne-Yo	Year of the Gentleman	3:55
5.	"Got Money"	Lil Wayne featuring T-Pain	Tha Carter III	4:06
6.	"Please Read the Letter"	Robert Plant and Alison Krauss	Raising Sand	3:56
7.	"House of Cards"	Radiohead	In Rainbows	5:29
8.	"Love Don't Live Here"	Lady Antebellum	Lady Antebellum	3:51
9.	"Burnin' Up"	Jonas Brothers	A Little Bit Longer	2:55
10.	"Need U Bad"	Jazmine Sullivan	Fearless	4:13
11.	"Mercy"	Duffy	Rockferry	3:41
12.	"Paper Planes"	M.I.A.	Kala	3:24
13.	"Chasing Pavements"	Adele	19	3:32
14.	"I Kissed a Girl"	Katy Perry	One of the Boys	3:01
15.	"Bleeding Love"	Leona Lewis	Spirit	4:01
16.	"So What"	P!nk	Funhouse	3:35
17.	"Going On"	Gnarls Barkley	The Odd Couple	2:55
18.	"Apologize"	OneRepublic	Dreaming Out Loud	3:05
19.	"Won't Go Home Without You"	Maroon 5	It Won't Be Soon Before Long	3:46
20.	"Waiting in the Weeds"	Eagles	Long Road Out of Eden	7:46

== 2010 ==
Grammy Nominees 2010 covers the top contenders for the 52nd Annual Grammy Awards. It debuted at number five on the Billboard 200 chart. The album has sold 235,000 copies as of March 2010.

2010 Grammy Nominees

Compilation album by various artists
- Released: January 19, 2010
- Genre: Pop
- Length: 79:29
- Label: EMI Music

Professional ratings
Review scores
Source	Rating
AllMusic	2.5/5 stars

No.	Title	Music	Album	Length
1.	"I Gotta Feeling"	The Black Eyed Peas	The E.N.D.	4:06
2.	"Poker Face"	Lady Gaga	The Fame	3:57
3.	"Use Somebody"	Kings of Leon	Only by the Night	3:51
4.	"You and Me"	Dave Matthews Band	Big Whiskey and the GrooGrux King	4:19
5.	"You Belong with Me"	Taylor Swift	Fearless	3:51
6.	"Fallin' for You"	Colbie Caillat	Breakthrough	3:37
7.	"You Found Me"	The Fray	The Fray	4:02
8.	"Sober"	P!nk	Funhouse	4:12
9.	"My Life Would Suck Without You"	Kelly Clarkson	All I Ever Wanted	3:33
10.	"Hot n Cold"	Katy Perry	One of the Boys	3:41
11.	"Halo"	Beyoncé	I Am... Sasha Fierce	3:45
12.	"Hometown Glory"	Adele	19	3:32
13.	"Chicken Fried"	Zac Brown Band	The Foundation	3:34
14.	"It Happens"	Sugarland	Love on the Inside	3:01
15.	"I Run to You"	Lady Antebellum	Lady Antebellum	3:48
16.	"Here Comes Goodbye"	Rascal Flatts	Unstoppable	4:05
17.	"21 Guns"	Green Day	21st Century Breakdown	5:22
18.	"Life in Technicolor II"	Coldplay	Prospekt's March	3:37
19.	"I'll Go Crazy If I Don't Go Crazy Tonight"	U2	No Line on the Horizon	4:13
20.	"Can't Find My Way Home"	Eric Clapton and Steve Winwood	Live from Madison Square Garden	5:32

== 2011 ==
The track listing for 2011 Grammy Nominees was revealed on January 6, 2011, and the album was released on January 25, 2011. It covers the top contenders for the 53rd Annual Grammy Awards. The album has sold 204,000 copies as of April 2011.

2011 Grammy Nominees

Compilation album by various artists
- Released: January 25, 2011
- Genre: Various
- Length: 74:32
- Label: Jive Records

Professional ratings
Review scores
Source	Rating
AllMusic	3/5 stars

No.	Title	Music	Album	Length
1.	"Forget You"	Cee Lo Green	The Lady Killer	3:43
2.	"Nothin' on You"	B.o.B featuring Bruno Mars	B.o.B Presents: The Adventures of Bobby Ray	3:44
3.	"California Gurls"	Katy Perry featuring Snoop Dogg	Teenage Dream	3:55
4.	"Telephone"	Lady Gaga featuring Beyoncé	The Fame Monster	3:41
5.	"Love the Way You Lie"	Eminem featuring Rihanna	Recovery	4:25
6.	"Need You Now"	Lady Antebellum	Need You Now	3:54
7.	"Ready to Start"	Arcade Fire	The Suburbs	4:19
8.	"Whataya Want from Me"	Adam Lambert	For Your Entertainment	3:47
9.	"Half of My Heart"	John Mayer with Taylor Swift	Battle Studies	3:54
10.	"Haven't Met You Yet"	Michael Bublé	Crazy Love	4:05
11.	"Just the Way You Are"	Bruno Mars	Doo-Wops & Hooligans	3:38
12.	"This Is It"	Michael Jackson	Michael Jackson's This Is It	3:42
13.	"Beg Steal or Borrow"	Ray LaMontagne and the Pariah Dogs	God Willin' & the Creek Don't Rise	4:32
14.	"The House That Built Me"	Miranda Lambert	Revolution	3:47
15.	"Babyfather"	Sade	Soldier of Love	4:02
16.	"The Only Exception"	Paramore	Brand New Eyes	4:27
17.	"Hey, Soul Sister" (live)	Train	iTunes Session	3:33
18.	"Misery"	Maroon 5	Hands All Over	3:33
19.	"Don't Stop Believin'" (Regionals version)	Glee Cast	Glee: The Music, Journey to Regionals	3:43

== 2012 ==
The 2012 edition was released on January 24, 2012, and covers the top contenders for the 54th Annual Grammy Awards. The album has sold 323,000 copies as of May 2012.

2012 Grammy Nominees

Compilation album by various artists
- Released: January 24, 2012
- Length: 79:46
- Label: Universal Republic Records

Professional ratings
Review scores
Source	Rating
AllMusic	3.5/5 stars

No.	Title	Music	Album	Length
1.	"Rolling in the Deep"	Adele	21	3:48
2.	"Grenade"	Bruno Mars	Doo-Wops & Hooligans	3:41
3.	"Firework"	Katy Perry	Teenage Dream	3:43
4.	"Moves like Jagger"	Maroon 5 featuring Christina Aguilera	Hands All Over	3:21
5.	"Super Bass"	Nicki Minaj	Pink Friday	3:21
6.	"What's My Name?"	Rihanna featuring Drake	Loud	3:50
7.	"Work Out"	J. Cole	Cole World: The Sideline Story	3:46
8.	"You and I"	Lady Gaga	Born This Way	4:06
9.	"Pumped Up Kicks"	Foster the People	Torches	3:31
10.	"Scary Monsters and Nice Sprites"	Skrillex	Scary Monsters and Nice Sprites	3:16
11.	"Paradise"	Coldplay	Mylo Xyloto	4:38
12.	"Walk"	Foo Fighters	Wasting Light	4:16
13.	"If I Die Young"	The Band Perry	The Band Perry	3:35
14.	"The Cave"	Mumford & Sons	Sigh No More	3:36
15.	"Holocene"	Bon Iver	Bon Iver	4:18
16.	"Just a Kiss"	Lady Antebellum	Own the Night	3:37
17.	"Mean"	Taylor Swift	Speak Now	3:56
18.	"Honey Bee"	Blake Shelton	Red River Blue	3:17
19.	"Drink in My Hand"	Eric Church	Chief	3:11
20.	"Dearest"	The Black Keys	Rave On Buddy Holly	2:04
21.	"Don't You Wanna Stay"	Jason Aldean with Kelly Clarkson	My Kinda Party	3:15
22.	"Body and Soul"	Tony Bennett and Amy Winehouse	Duets II	3:20

== 2013 ==
2013 Grammy Nominees covers the top contenders for the 55th Annual Grammy Awards. The album has sold 315,000 copies as of May 2013.

2013 Grammy Nominees

Compilation album by various artists
- Released: January 22, 2013
- Genre: Pop
- Label: Capitol

No.	Title	Music	Album	Length
1.	"Lonely Boy"	The Black Keys	El Camino	3:13
2.	"Stronger (What Doesn't Kill You)"	Kelly Clarkson	Stronger	3:41
3.	"We Are Never Ever Getting Back Together"	Taylor Swift	Red	3:11
4.	"Somebody That I Used to Know"	Gotye featuring Kimbra	Making Mirrors	3:27
5.	"Wide Awake"	Katy Perry	Teenage Dream: The Complete Confection	3:39
6.	"We Are Young"	Fun featuring Janelle Monáe	Some Nights	3:52
7.	"Shake It Out"	Florence and the Machine	Ceremonials	3:51
8.	"Try"	P!nk	The Truth About Love	4:00
9.	"Payphone"	Maroon 5 featuring Wiz Khalifa	Overexposed	3:51
10.	"Call Me Maybe"	Carly Rae Jepsen	Kiss	3:13
11.	"Adorn"	Miguel	Kaleidoscope Dream	3:13
12.	"The A Team"	Ed Sheeran	+	3:42
13.	"Wanted"	Hunter Hayes	Hunter Hayes	3:48
14.	"Ho Hey"	The Lumineers	The Lumineers	2:34
15.	"Hold On"	Alabama Shakes	Boys & Girls	3:45
16.	"I Will Wait"	Mumford & Sons	Babel	4:35
17.	"Pyramids"	Frank Ocean	Channel Orange	3:59
18.	"We Take Care of Our Own"	Bruce Springsteen	Wrecking Ball	3:53
19.	"Freedom at 21"	Jack White	Blunderbuss	2:46
20.	"Madness"	Muse	The 2nd Law	3:34
21.	"Charlie Brown"	Coldplay	Mylo Xyloto	3:45
22.	"Set Fire to the Rain" (Live)	Adele	Live at the Royal Albert Hall	4:10

== 2014 ==
Grammy Nominees 2014 covers the top contenders for the 56th Annual Grammy Awards. The album has sold 309,000 copies in the US as of July 2014.

2014 Grammy Nominees

Compilation album by various artists
- Released: January 17, 2014 (Australia); January 21, 2014 (US)
- Genre: Pop
- Length: 70:19
- Label: Atlantic

No.	Title	Music	Album	Length
1.	"Locked Out of Heaven"	Bruno Mars	Unorthodox Jukebox
2.	"Blurred Lines"	Robin Thicke featuring T.I. and Pharrell Williams	Blurred Lines
3.	"Royals"	Lorde	Pure Heroine
4.	"Radioactive"	Imagine Dragons	Night Visions
5.	"Get Lucky"	Daft Punk featuring Pharrell Williams	Random Access Memories
6.	"Roar"	Katy Perry	Prism
7.	"Mirrors"	Justin Timberlake	The 20/20 Experience
8.	"Brave"	Sara Bareilles	The Blessed Unrest
9.	"Same Love"	Macklemore and Ryan Lewis featuring Mary Lambert	The Heist
10.	"Retrograde"	James Blake	Overgrown
11.	"Swimming Pools (Drank)"	Kendrick Lamar	Good Kid, M.A.A.D City
12.	"Lego House"	Ed Sheeran	+
13.	"Just Give Me a Reason"	P!nk featuring Nate Ruess	The Truth About Love
14.	"Begin Again"	Taylor Swift	Red
15.	"Mine Would Be You"	Blake Shelton	Based on a True Story...
16.	"Merry Go 'Round"	Kacey Musgraves	Same Trailer Different Park
17.	"Highway Don't Care"	Tim McGraw featuring Taylor Swift and Keith Urban	Two Lanes of Freedom
18.	"Take a Little Ride"	Jason Aldean	Night Train

== 2015 ==
2015 Grammy Nominees

Compilation album by various artists
- Released: January 20, 2015
- Genres: Pop; country
- Length: 75:43
- Label: RCA

2015 Grammy Nominees covers the Record of the Year, Album of the Year, Song of the Year, Best Pop Vocal Album, Best Pop Solo Performance, and Best Country Duo/Group Performance nominees for the 57th Annual Grammy Awards.

The album debuted at number 12 on the US Billboard 200 on the week dated February 7, 2015, and peaked at number 9 three weeks later. It also peaked at number 2 on the Canadian Albums Chart.

No.	Title	Music	Album	Length
1.	"Shake It Off"	Taylor Swift	1989
2.	"Fancy"	Iggy Azalea featuring Charli XCX	The New Classic
3.	"Sing"	Ed Sheeran	×
4.	"Problem"	Ariana Grande featuring Iggy Azalea	My Everything
5.	"All About That Bass"	Meghan Trainor	Title
6.	"Dark Horse"	Katy Perry featuring Juicy J	Prism
7.	"A Sky Full of Stars"	Coldplay	Ghost Stories
8.	"Wrecking Ball"	Miley Cyrus	Bangerz
9.	"Chandelier"	Sia	1000 Forms of Fear
10.	"All of Me" (Live)	John Legend	Love in the Future
11.	"Take Me to Church"	Hozier	Hozier
12.	"Drunk In Love"	Beyoncé featuring Jay Z	Beyoncé
13.	"Come Get It Bae"	Pharrell Williams	Girl
14.	"Stay with Me" (Darkchild Version)	Sam Smith	In the Lonely Hour
15.	"Blue Moon"	Beck	Morning Phase
16.	"Raise 'Em Up"	Keith Urban featuring Eric Church	Fuse
17.	"Gentle on My Mind"	The Band Perry	Glen Campbell: I'll Be Me
18.	"Meanwhile Back at Mama's"	Tim McGraw featuring Faith Hill	Sundown Heaven Town
19.	"Somethin' Bad"	Miranda Lambert with Carrie Underwood	Platinum
20.	"Day Drinking"	Little Big Town	Pain Killer
21.	"Happy" (Live)	Pharrell Williams	Previously unreleased; studio version featured on Girl

== 2016 ==
2016 Grammy Nominees

Compilation album by various artists
- Released: January 22, 2016
- Genres: Pop; country
- Length: 77:51
- Label: Republic

2016 Grammy Nominees covers the Record of the Year, Album of the Year, Song of the Year, Best New Artist, Best Pop Duo/Group Performance, and Best Country Solo Performance nominees for the 58th Annual Grammy Awards.

No.	Title	Music	Album	Length
1.	"Uptown Funk"	Mark Ronson featuring Bruno Mars	Uptown Special
2.	"Blank Space"	Taylor Swift	1989
3.	"Can't Feel My Face"	The Weeknd	Beauty Behind the Madness
4.	"Thinking Out Loud"	Ed Sheeran	×
5.	"Sugar"	Maroon 5	V
6.	"Ship to Wreck"	Florence and the Machine	How Big, How Blue, How Beautiful
7.	"Don't Wanna Fight"	Alabama Shakes	Sound & Color
8.	"Really Love"	D'Angelo and the Vanguard	Black Messiah
9.	"Alright"	Kendrick Lamar	To Pimp a Butterfly
10.	"Traveller"	Chris Stapleton	Traveller
11.	"Girl Crush"	Little Big Town	Pain Killer
12.	"See You Again" (from Furious 7)	Wiz Khalifa featuring Charlie Puth	Furious 7: Original Motion Picture Soundtrack
13.	"Lips Are Movin"	Meghan Trainor	Title
14.	"Should've Been Us"	Tori Kelly	Unbreakable Smile
15.	"Take Your Time"	Sam Hunt	Montevallo
16.	"Hold Back the River"	James Bay	Chaos and the Calm
17.	"Pedestrian at Best"	Courtney Barnett	Sometimes I Sit and Think, and Sometimes I Just Sit
18.	"Little Toy Guns"	Carrie Underwood	Greatest Hits: Decade #1
19.	"Burning House"	Cam	Untamed
20.	"Chances Are"	Lee Ann Womack	The Way I'm Livin'
21.	"John Cougar, John Deere, John 3:16"	Keith Urban	Ripcord

== 2017 ==
2017 Grammy Nominees

Compilation album by various artists
- Released: January 20, 2017
- Genres: Pop; urban contemporary; country
- Length: 79:40
- Label: Atlantic

2017 Grammy Nominees covers the Record of the Year, Album of the Year, Best New Artist, Best Pop Solo Performance, Best Pop Duo/Group Performance, Best Pop Vocal Album, Best Country Song and Best Country Solo Performance nominees for the 59th Annual Grammy Awards.

No.	Title	Music	Album	Length
1.	"Don't Hurt Yourself"	Beyoncé featuring Jack White	Lemonade	3:54
2.	"Stressed Out"	Twenty One Pilots	Blurryface	3:11
3.	"Cheap Thrills"	Sia featuring Sean Paul	This Is Acting	3:41
4.	"Hotline Bling"	Drake	Views	3:47
5.	"Hello"	Adele	25	4:14
6.	"Love Yourself"	Justin Bieber	Purpose	3:52
7.	"Closer"	The Chainsmokers featuring Halsey	Collage	3:30
8.	"Peter Pan"	Kelsea Ballerini	The First Time	3:15
9.	"My Church"	Maren Morris	Hero	3:14
10.	"Brace for Impact (Live a Little)"	Sturgill Simpson	A Sailor's Guide to Earth	5:33
11.	"Am I Wrong"	Anderson Paak featuring Schoolboy Q	Malibu	4:13
12.	"Confident"	Demi Lovato	Confident	3:25
13.	"Dangerous Woman"	Ariana Grande	Dangerous Woman	3:52
14.	"Piece By Piece" (Idol Version)	Kelly Clarkson	Piece by Piece Remixed	3:30
15.	"7 Years"	Lukas Graham	Lukas Graham	3:57
16.	"Church Bells"	Carrie Underwood	Storyteller	3:12
17.	"Blue Ain't Your Color"	Keith Urban	Ripcord	3:49
18.	"Love Can Go to Hell"	Brandy Clark	Big Day in a Small Town	3:57
19.	"Die a Happy Man"	Thomas Rhett	Tangled Up	3:46
20.	"Vice"	Miranda Lambert	The Weight of These Wings	3:34
21.	"Humble and Kind"	Tim McGraw	Damn Country Music	4:14

== 2018 ==
2018 Grammy Nominees

Compilation album by various artists
- Released: January 12, 2018
- Genres: Pop; R&B; urban contemporary; country
- Length: 73:51
- Label: RCA

2018 Grammy Nominees covers the Record of the Year, Album of the Year, Best Pop Solo Performance, Best Pop Duo/Group Performance, and Best Country Album nominees for the 60th Annual Grammy Awards.

No.	Title	Music	Album	Length
1.	"24K Magic"	Bruno Mars	24K Magic	3:45
2.	"Love So Soft"	Kelly Clarkson	Meaning of Life	2:52
3.	"Despacito" (Remix)	Luis Fonsi and Daddy Yankee featuring Justin Bieber	Single release	3:49
4.	"Humble"	Kendrick Lamar	Damn	2:57
5.	"Green Light"	Lorde	Melodrama	3:54
6.	"Redbone"	Childish Gambino	"Awaken, My Love!"	3:27
7.	"The Story of O.J."	Jay-Z	4:44	3:52
8.	"Stay"	Zedd and Alessia Cara	Single release	3:32
9.	"Million Reasons"	Lady Gaga	Joanne	3:24
10.	"Thunder"	Imagine Dragons	Evolve	3:05
11.	"Feel It Still"	Portugal. The Man	Woodstock	2:43
12.	"Something Just Like This"	The Chainsmokers and Coldplay	Memories...Do Not Open	4:04
13.	"What About Us"	Pink	Beautiful Trauma	3:57
14.	"1-800-273-8255"	Logic featuring Alessia Cara and Khalid	Everybody	4:12
15.	"Issues"	Julia Michaels	Nervous System	2:56
16.	"Praying"	Kesha	Rainbow	3:49
17.	"Broken Halos"	Chris Stapleton	From A Room: Volume 1	2:58
18.	"Better Man"	Little Big Town	The Breaker	4:22
19.	"Craving You"	Thomas Rhett featuring Maren Morris	Life Changes	3:42
20.	"You Look Good"	Lady Antebellum	Heart Break	3:01
21.	"All the Pretty Girls"	Kenny Chesney	Cosmic Hallelujah	3:30

== 2019 ==
2019 Grammy Nominees

Compilation album by various artists
- Released: January 25, 2019
- Genres: Pop; R&B; urban contemporary; country
- Length: 79:46
- Label: RCA

2019 Grammy Nominees covers the Record of the Year, Album of the Year, Best Pop Vocal Album and Best Pop Duo/Group Performance nominees for the 61st Annual Grammy Awards.

No.	Title	Music	Album	Length
1.	"Make Me Feel"	Janelle Monáe	Dirty Computer	3:14
2.	"I Like It"	Cardi B, Bad Bunny and J Balvin	Invasion Of Privacy	4:13
3.	"All the Stars"	Kendrick Lamar and SZA	Black Panther: The Album	3:53
4.	"God's Plan"	Drake	Scorpion	3:19
5.	"The Middle"	Zedd, Maren Morris and Grey	Single release	3:05
6.	"Slow Burn"	Kacey Musgraves	Golden Hour	4:05
7.	"Rockstar"	Post Malone featuring 21 Savage	Beerbongs & Bentleys	3:18
8.	"Best Part"	H.E.R. featuring Daniel Caesar	H.E.R.	3:30
9.	"This Is America"	Childish Gambino	Single release	3:29
10.	"The Joke"	Brandi Carlile	By the Way, I Forgive You	4:39
11.	"Shallow"	Lady Gaga and Bradley Cooper	A Star Is Born	3:36
12.	"God Is a Woman"	Ariana Grande	Sweetener	3:13
13.	"Havana"	Camila Cabello featuring Young Thug	Camila	2:56
14.	"Look What You Made Me Do"	Taylor Swift	Reputation	3:31
15.	"In My Blood"	Shawn Mendes	Shawn Mendes	3:31
16.	"I Don't Think About You"	Kelly Clarkson	Meaning of Life	3:44
17.	"Beautiful Trauma"	Pink	Beautiful Trauma	3:42
18.	"Say Something"	Justin Timberlake featuring Chris Stapleton	Man of the Woods	4:37
19.	"Girls Like You"	Maroon 5 featuring Cardi B	Red Pill Blues	3:55
20.	"Fall in Line"	Christina Aguilera featuring Demi Lovato	Liberation	3:53
21.	"Don't Go Breaking My Heart"	Backstreet Boys	DNA	3:35
22.	"'S Wonderful"	Tony Bennett and Diana Krall	Love Is Here To Stay	2:48

== 2020 ==
2020 Grammy Nominees

Compilation album by various artists
- Released: January 17, 2020
- Genres: Pop; R&B; urban contemporary; country
- Label: Warner

2020 Grammy Nominees covers the Record of the Year, Album of the Year, Best Pop Vocal Album, Best Pop Duo/Group Performance and Best Country Duo/Group Performance nominees for the 62nd Annual Grammy Awards.

No.	Title	Music	Album	Length
1.	"Bad Guy"	Billie Eilish	When We All Fall Asleep, Where Do We Go?
2.	"7 Rings"	Ariana Grande	Thank U, Next
3.	"Old Town Road (Remix)"	Lil Nas X featuring Billy Ray Cyrus	7
4.	"Truth Hurts"	Lizzo	Cuz I Love You (Deluxe)
5.	"Talk"	Khalid	Free Spirit
6.	"Hard Place"	H.E.R.	I Used to Know Her
7.	"Señorita"	Shawn Mendes and Camila Cabello	Shawn Mendes (Deluxe)
8.	"Boyfriend"	Ariana Grande and Social House	Everything Changed...
9.	"I Don't Care"	Ed Sheeran and Justin Bieber	No. 6 Collaborations Project
10.	"Sunflower"	Post Malone and Swae Lee	Spider-Man: Into the Spider-Verse
11.	"Lover"	Taylor Swift	Lover
12.	"Sucker"	Jonas Brothers	Happiness Begins
13.	"Harmony Hall"	Vampire Weekend	Father of the Bride
14.	"Hey, Ma"	Bon Iver	I, I
15.	"Spirit" (from Disney's The Lion King)	Beyoncé	The Lion King: The Gift
16.	"Norman Fucking Rockwell"	Lana Del Rey	Norman Fucking Rockwell!
17.	"The Daughters"	Little Big Town	Single release
18.	"Speechless"	Dan + Shay	Dan + Shay
19.	"Common"	Maren Morris featuring Brandi Carlile	Girl
20.	"I Don't Remember Me (Before You)"	Brothers Osborne	Port Saint Joe
21.	"Brand New Man"	Brooks & Dunn with Luke Combs	Reboot

=== Charts ===
Chart (1995–2020)	Peak position
Canadian Albums (Billboard)	32
US Billboard 200	59

== See also ==
- Grammy Rap Nominees
- Grammy Award
