= Call and Response: The Remix Album =

Remix album by Maroon 5
- Released: December 9, 2008
- Genres: Dance; hip hop; R&B
- Length: 75:17
- Label: A&M Octone
- Producers: Various: Sam Farrar (exec.); Maroon 5; Swizz Beatz; Mark Ronson; Just Blaze; Questlove; Tricky Stewart; Cut Copy; Pharrell Williams; DJ Quick; David Banner; The Cool Kids; Bloodshy & Avant; Of Montreal; Deerhoof; Tiësto; Ali Shaheed Muhammad; DJ Premier; Paul Oakenfold

Maroon 5 chronology
The B-Side Collection (2007)	Call and Response: The Remix Album (2008)	Hands All Over (2010)

Call and Response: The Remix Album is a remix album by Maroon 5, released on December 9, 2008. It features remixes of songs from the group's first two studio albums, Songs About Jane and It Won't Be Soon Before Long, by various artists and producers.

The remix of the song "Not Falling Apart" by Tiësto peaked at number 3 on the Billboard Hot Dance Club Play chart.

== Track listing ==
No.	Title	Length
1.	"If I Never See Your Face Again" (Swizz Beatz Remix) (featuring Cross)	3:45
2.	"Wake Up Call" (Mark Ronson Remix) (featuring Mary J. Blige)	3:09
3.	"Sunday Morning" (Questlove Remix)	3:46
4.	"Makes Me Wonder" (Just Blaze Remix)	5:55
5.	"This Love" (C. "Tricky" Stewart Remix)	2:59
6.	"She Will Be Loved" (Pharrell Williams Remix)	4:22
7.	"Shiver" (DJ Quik Remix)	2:47
8.	"Wake Up Call" (David Banner Remix) (featuring David Banner)	3:20
9.	"Harder to Breathe" (The Cool Kids Remix) (featuring The Cool Kids)	2:59
10.	"Little of Your Time" (Bloodshy and Avant Remix)	3:54
11.	"Little of Your Time" (Of Montreal Remix)	3:00
12.	"Goodnight Goodnight" (Deerhoof Remix)	4:02
13.	"Not Falling Apart" (Tiësto Remix)	6:09
14.	"Better That We Break" (Ali Shaheed Muhammad and Doc Remix)	2:38
15.	"Secret" (DJ Premier Remix)	3:54
16.	"Woman" (Sam Farrar Remix)	4:12
17.	"This Love" (Cut Copy Galactic Beach House Mix)	7:23
18.	"If I Never See Your Face Again" (Paul Oakenfold Remix) (featuring Rihanna)	7:03
Total length:		75:17

== Critical reception ==
Professional ratings
Aggregate scores
Source	Rating
Metacritic	66/100
Review scores
Source	Rating
AllMusic	2.5/5 stars
Billboard	(positive)
Entertainment Weekly	B+
Okayplayer	(91/100)
Rolling Stone	3.5/5 stars

Giving the album a B+, Entertainment Weekly said that "The L.A. quintet makes it work on Call and Response: The Remix Album, letting those unusual suspects--along with hitmakers like Mark Ronson and Pharrell Williams--play with their master tapes."

== Charts ==
The album debuted on the Billboard 200 at number 73.

Chart (2008)	Peak position
US Billboard 200	73

== Release history ==
Region	Date	Label	Ref.
United States	December 9, 2008	A&M Octone	
