= Grammy Rap Nominees =

Compilation album series

The Grammy Rap Nominees was a series of various artists compilation albums that were released from 1999–2001. Albums are released before the airing of the annual Grammy Awards. All of the songs on the albums are Grammy nominated in the year released. The last edition, released in 2001 was a compilation of both rap and R&B nominated songs.

== 1999 ==
Grammy Rap Nominees 1999

Compilation album by Various Artists
- Released: February 9, 1999
- Genre: Rap
- Length: 52:47
- Label: Elektra

Professional ratings
Review scores
Source	Rating
Allmusic	link

No.	Title	Music	Album	Length
1.	"Dangerous"	Busta Rhymes	When Disaster Strikes	3:38
2.	"Lost Ones"	Lauryn Hill	The Miseducation of Lauryn Hill	4:27
3.	"Gone till November"	Wyclef Jean	The Carnival	3:28
4.	"Gettin' Jiggy wit It"	Will Smith	Big Willie Style	3:48
5.	"Intergalactic"	Beastie Boys	Hello Nasty	3:31
6.	"Money Ain't a Thang"	Jermaine Dupri featuring Jay-Z	Life in 1472	4:16
7.	"Deja Vu (Uptown Baby)"	Lord Tariq and Peter Gunz	Make It Reign	4:43
8.	"Rosa Parks"	OutKast	Aquemini	4:27
9.	"Ghetto Supastar (That Is What You Are)"	Pras Michel featuring Ol' Dirty Bastard & Mýa	Bulworth	4:26
10.	"You Came Up"	Big Pun featuring Noreaga	Capital Punishment	4:03
11.	"Sweetheart"	Jermaine Dupri & Mariah Carey	Life in 1472	4:22
12.	"Lookin' at Me"	Mase featuring Puff Daddy	Harlem World	4:15
13.	"Find a Way"	A Tribe Called Quest	The Love Movement	3:23

== 2000 ==
Grammy Rap Nominees 2000

Compilation album by Various Artists
- Released: February 8, 2000
- Genre: Rap
- Length: 40:55
- Label: RCA

Professional ratings
Review scores
Source	Rating
Allmusic	link

No.	Title	Music	Album	Length
1.	"Gimme Some More"	Busta Rhymes	E.L.E. (Extinction Level Event): The Final World Front	2:39
2.	"My Name Is"	Eminem	The Slim Shady LP	4:29
3.	"Wild Wild West"	Will Smith featuring Dru Hill & Kool Moe Dee	Wild Wild West: Music Inspired by the Motion Picture	4:06
4.	"What's It Gonna Be?!"	Busta Rhymes featuring Janet Jackson	E.L.E. (Extinction Level Event): The Final World Front	5:24
5.	"Still D.R.E."	Dr. Dre featuring Snoop Dogg	2001	4:29
6.	"Guilty Conscience"	Eminem featuring Dr. Dre	The Slim Shady LP	3:20
7.	"You Got Me"	The Roots featuring Erykah Badu & Eve	Things Fall Apart	4:20
8.	"She's a Bitch"	Missy "Misdemeanor" Elliott	Da Real World	4:01
9.	"Nas Is Like"	Nas	I Am...	3:57
10.	"The Next Movement"	The Roots	Things Fall Apart	4:10

== 2001 ==
Grammy R&B/Rap Nominees 2001

Compilation album by Various Artists
- Released: February 6, 2001
- Genre: R&B, Rap
- Length: 73:21
- Label: Capitol

Professional ratings
Review scores
Source	Rating
Allmusic	link

No.	Title	Music	Album	Length
1.	"Try Again"	Aaliyah	Romeo Must Die: The Album	4:05
2.	"Bag Lady"	Erykah Badu	Mama's Gun	4:07
3.	"He Wasn't Man Enough"	Toni Braxton	The Heat	4:22
4.	"As We Lay"	Kelly Price	Mirror Mirror	4:04
5.	"Gettin' In the Way"	Jill Scott	Who Is Jill Scott? Words and Sounds Vol. 1	3:57
6.	"Untitled (How Does It Feel)"	D'Angelo	Voodoo	4:21
7.	"I Wanna Know"	Joe	My Name Is Joe	4:56
8.	"I Wish"	R. Kelly	TP-2.com	5:34
9.	"Stay Or Let It Go"	Brian McKnight	Back at One	4:41
10.	"Thong Song"	Sisqó	Unleash the Dragon	4:13
11.	"The Light"	Common	Like Water for Chocolate	4:04
12.	"Party Up (Up in Here)"	DMX	... And Then There Was X	4:31
13.	"The Real Slim Shady"	Eminem	The Marshall Mathers LP	4:47
14.	"Shake Ya Ass"	Mystikal	Let's Get Ready	4:18
15.	"Country Grammar (Hot Shit)"	Nelly	Country Grammar	4:48
16.	"Alive"	Beastie Boys	Beastie Boys Anthology: The Sounds of Science	3:49
17.	"The Next Episode"	Dr. Dre featuring Snoop Dogg	2001	2:44

== See also ==
- Grammy Nominees
