= Makes Me Wonder =

Single by Maroon 5

from the album It Won't Be Soon Before Long
- B-side: "The Way I Was"; "Story"
- Released: March 27, 2007
- Recorded: 2007
- Studio: House of Blues (Encino, California); Sunset Sound (Los Angeles, California)
- Genre: Alternative dance; dance-rock; pop rock; funk
- Length: 3:31
- Label: A&M Octone
- Songwriters: Adam Levine; Jesse Carmichael; Mickey Madden
- Producers: Mark Endert; Maroon 5

Maroon 5 singles chronology
"Must Get Out" (2005)	"Makes Me Wonder" (2007)	"Wake Up Call" (2007)

Music video
- "Makes Me Wonder" on YouTube

"Makes Me Wonder" is a song by American pop rock band Maroon 5. It was released on March 27, 2007, as the first single from their second studio album, It Won't Be Soon Before Long (2007). Upon its release, the song set a record for the biggest jump to number-one in the history of the Billboard Hot 100 chart, rising from number 64 to number one. However, the record was later broken by Britney Spears' 2008 single, "Womanizer" which was broken by Kelly Clarkson's 2009 single, "My Life Would Suck Without You".

"Makes Me Wonder" also became the band's first number-one on the Billboard Hot 100 chart. The song won the Grammy Award for Best Pop Performance by a Duo or Group with Vocal at the 50th Grammy Awards, their second song to win the award. The song was among the most successful of 2007, and was their biggest hit until the release of "Moves like Jagger" by the band in 2011.

Despite the song's commercial success, critical reception was mixed. It was ranked number 49 on Rolling Stone's list of the 100 Best Songs of 2007. Billboard crowned the song number one in its 2022 ranking of the 10 best Maroon 5 songs of all time.

== Background and writing ==
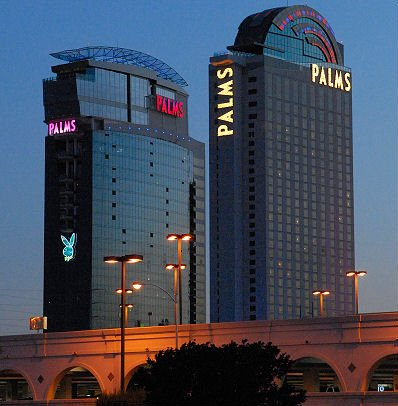
Maroon 5 worked with producer Mark Endert for "Makes Me Wonder" at Studio at the Palms in Las Vegas.

Adam Levine began writing parts of "Makes Me Wonder" years before its release in 2007. Maroon 5 recorded a demo of it, which was one of their firsts while on the "road". The band however put the track aside, and years later revisited it for It Won't Be Soon Before Long. Levine recalled that the song "kept coming up because the label loved it". After taking a break from their previous studio sessions for It Won't Be Soon Before Long, which was intended to gain "perspective" with the tracks, Maroon 5 regrouped at Glenwood Place Studios in Burbank, California. There, they "rethought a couple of songs and we went back and recut about three songs".

Reworking the song for their new album, Maroon 5 struggled to finish "Makes Me Wonder". The band could not formulate a chorus that would match with the rest of "Makes Me Wonder"'s music, which then had been around for four years. At one point, it had the band deciding to venture into a songwriting trip to "somewhere without distractions". While working on another song when they went to a Las Vegas studio, Maroon 5 came up with a part that would work "if they changed the chords". Levine recalls, "It was actually great because we were distracted just enough that we didn't think about it too much, and then we wrote this part that wound up being the chorus."

== Production and music ==
Prior to "Makes Me Wonder", producer Mark Endert had contributed to the band's debut album, Songs About Jane, in which he provided additional production to and mixed the hit single "This Love". Having worked on a song called "Wake Up Call" for the new album, Endert's involvement transitioned to "Makes Me Wonder". Maroon 5, having re-examined the song, asked Endert to assist them on a track which they did not like. To Endert, the band did not "feel like they had realized its potential". However, "They were open to new ideas, so I had the freedom to go and look for a new approach."

Working on the new material, Endert produced a mockup for the track's arrangement, a process he normally does as a producer. Using his Logic system at Scream Studios, he programmed the keyboards, bass, guitars on an old '80s Roland. When done, Endert flew to Los Angeles to present to the band the track, to which they approved. Endert and the band went to the Sunset Sound studio where they added track and "replaced any parts in Logic that were considered band instruments", resulting to it sounding like Maroon 5's.

According to producer Mark Endert, the idea was to make the song's music contemporary and urban. Meanwhile, they wanted to render it classic by making references to '70s and early '80s sound. Its music changed from "a more rock 'n' roll feel to a '70s funk vibe".

== Lyrical meaning ==
"Makes Me Wonder" began as a love song which Levine wrote about a "failed relationship", which he said went horribly wrong. However, when he revisited the song for It Won't Be Soon Before Long a few years later, Levine "recognized a whole new dimension" to it which resulted to his adding political insights on the lyrics.

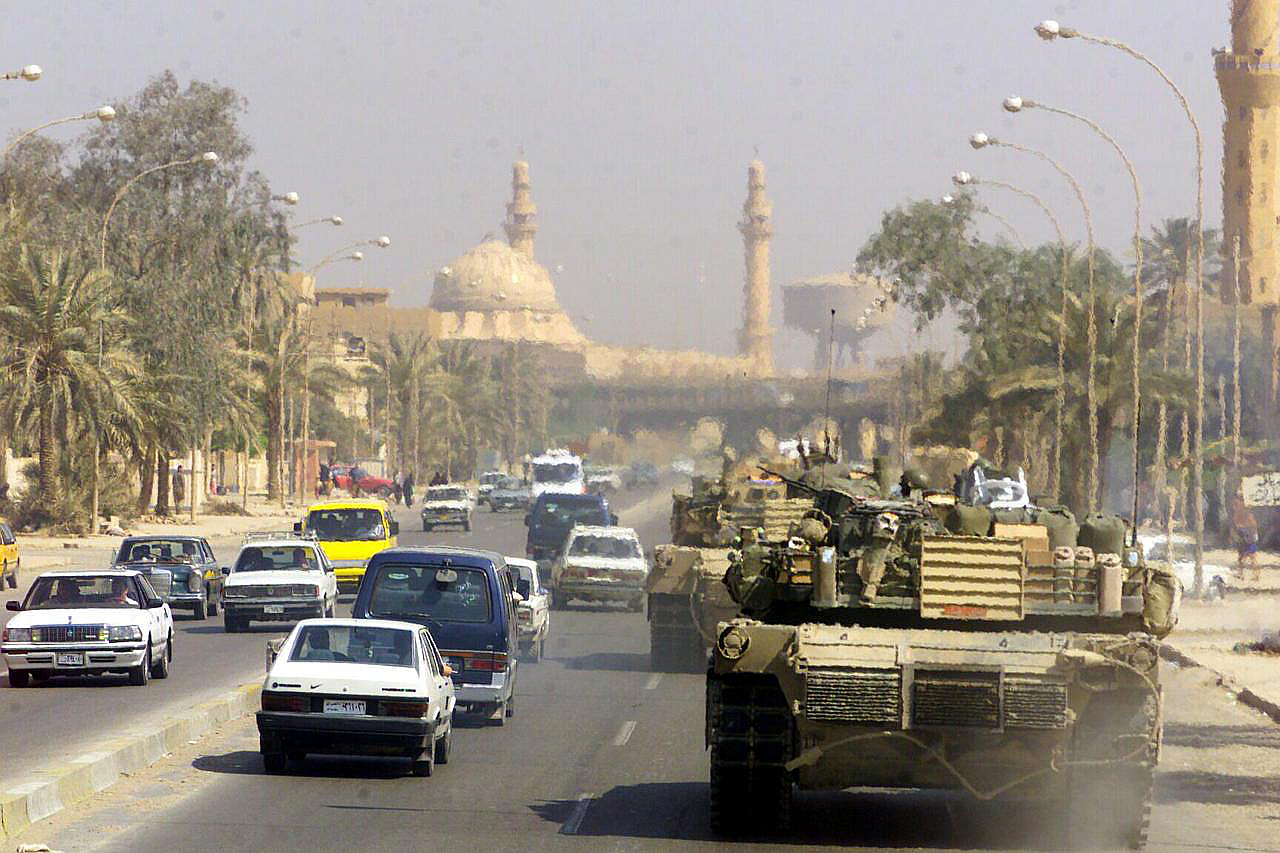
One meaning of "Makes Me Wonder" is about Levine's frustration at the state of politics and the United States' role in the war in Iraq.

The lyrics of "Makes Me Wonder" have two different meanings. It contains political insinuations disguised as a love song because of Levine's not wanting to be preachy. It combines lyrics about his being in a state of a failed relationship and his "failure to understand or trust" the leadership of his country.

One meaning is about Levine's frustration at the state of politics and the United States' role in the war in Iraq. From the original lyrics, they incorporated the line "Give me something to believe in / Because I don't believe in you anymore" which became the refrain to the chorus. Levine revealed that the lyrics "maybe not targeted at the Bush Administration, but maybe dancing around that territory a little bit". "Makes Me Wonder" shows the band's confusion about the politics in the country. Levine explains:

I really wanted to write a political song, a song that reflected the way I felt about everything. It's one of the most difficult things in the world to do without coming off as a total arse and preachy - all the things that I hate about a lot of songwriting. So I didn't want to overtly say it. I just wanted to allude to it.

The second meaning is simply about love. The lyrics in the chorus reflects one of Levine's relationships that went horribly wrong. Levine states about their relationship, "It had something to do with our growing dissatisfaction with things and the confusion that was in the air."

== Critical reception ==
The song received mixed reviews from music critics. Stephen Thomas Erlewine of AllMusic, discussing the identity of Maroon 5's music, noted that "Makes Me Wonder", even with its "flash[y] production", is not about its "feel" but the song itself that makes the album "work". Ann Powers of the Los Angeles Times called "Makes Me Wonder" an "aggravatingly danceable track".

For Neil Drumming of Entertainment Weekly, Levine seems "detached ... cold even" in the song, adding that "there's a twisted logic to his dispassionate delivery". Wrote Rosie Swash of The Guardian, "'Makes Me Wonder' is so bland it's offensive." Robert Christgau, in his review for Rolling Stone, noted the "political subtext" of the song.

The band won their third Grammy Award for Best Pop Performance by a Duo or Group with Vocal for "Makes Me Wonder" at the 50th anniversary show of the Grammys on February 10, 2008. It was their second win in this category after "This Love".

== Chart performance ==
The song has had one of the biggest bullets in Hot Adult history, with many AC radio stations putting it into heavy rotation mere days after its release. The song reached number 11 on the U.S. Adult Top 40 after only two weeks on the chart, becoming only the third song since 2000 to reach the top 15 of the Adult Top 40 in two weeks or less.

In the Billboard magazine issue dated May 12, 2007, Maroon 5 scored their first number-one on the Billboard Hot 100, due to strong radio airplay and 243,500 digital downloads. By doing so, they broke a record held by Kelly Clarkson's "A Moment Like This" for the biggest jump to number one in Hot 100 history, leaping from number 64 to number one (Clarkson's single had jumped from number 52 in October 2002). "Makes Me Wonder" remained at number one for a second week before falling to number two and then returning to number one in the following week. As of June 2014, it has sold 2,923,000 downloads in the US alone.

In the UK, the song debuted at number 19 with downloads alone a week before its physical release and rose to number 2 the second week, kept off the top spot by Rihanna's "Umbrella". In Mexico, it went on to sell over 420,000 digital downloads.

== Music video ==
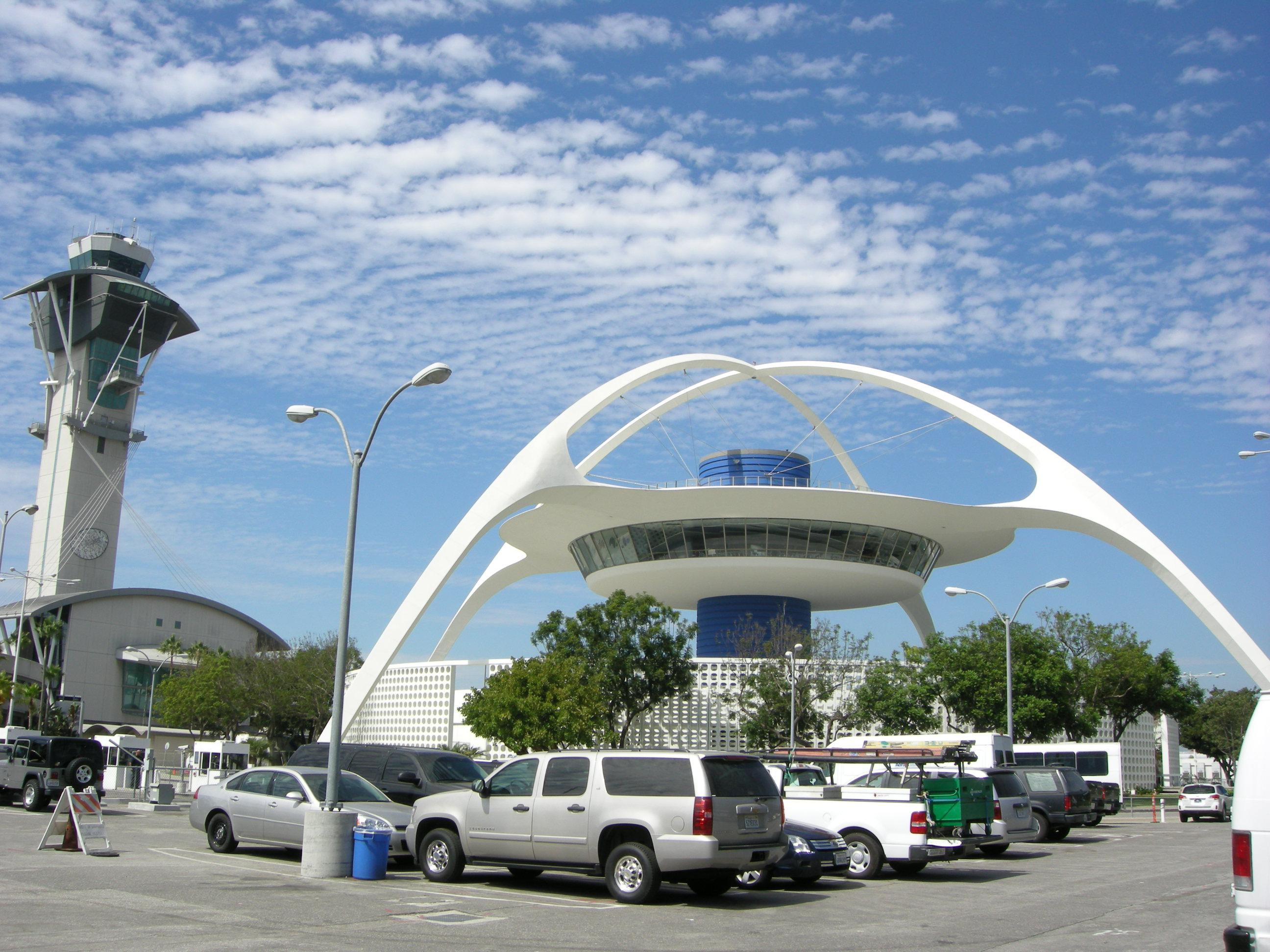
Maroon 5 shot the video of "Makes Me Wonder" at the Los Angeles International Airport.

Directed by John Hillcoat, the video was shot at the Los Angeles International Airport, the Los Angeles Department of Transportation and also at the Caltrans District 7 Headquarters. Levine said Hillcoat had an idea of turning the airport into a retro-futuristic, bizarre, surreal, sexually charged, fashionable world. It was the band's first music video without former drummer Ryan Dusick, who had left the band the previous year, and it was their first video to feature new drummer Matt Flynn. The clean version of the song is used in the video. At the end of the video, Levine is shown asleep on the plane with an eye mask on as the song plays in the background.

The video premiered on MTV's Total Request Live (TRL) on March 29, 2007. In the video, the gate they are in is "M5", which stands for Maroon 5.

== Live performances ==
Maroon 5 performed "Makes Me Wonder" for the first time at the 2007 Kids' Choice Awards on March 31, 2007. Later, they continued with the song at the 2007 MuchMusic Video Awards on June 17, and Canadian Idol on August 14, respectively. Maroon 5 performed "Makes Me Wonder" for their ten-date Club Tour from April to June 2007, and the It Won't Be Soon Before Long Tour (2007–2008). The band played with the song live in their various appearances such as American Idol, Good Morning America, Saturday Night Live, The Tonight Show with Jay Leno, The Ellen DeGeneres Show, Rove and TRL. As of 2024, it is the only song from the album that is played live at nearly every show.

== Appearances in other media ==
The song was featured in the television shows Ghost Whisperer, The Hills and Beat Shazam, as well as for the trailer of 27 Dresses (2008). An acoustic version of the song was featured on Radio 1's Live Lounge – Volume 2 and the remix versions by Stargate featuring Mims and Just Blaze (with the latter was included on Call and Response: The Remix Album). The song was featured on the video games Speed Drifters, Lips and Boogie Superstar. This song was used on the dance video game Dance Dance Revolution Hottest Party 2 and was covered by the artist Sunshine Superman. It is also included on Grammy Nominees 2008 and Maroon 5's greatest hits album Singles (2015).

== Track listings ==
CD promo
No.	Title	Length
1.	"Makes Me Wonder" (Clean version)	3:32
2.	"Makes Me Wonder" (Super clean version)	3:31
3.	"Makes Me Wonder" (Album version)	3:31

US 2-track CD (Released: March 27, 2007)
No.	Title	Length
1.	"Makes Me Wonder" (Clean version)	3:31
2.	"Makes Me Wonder" (Album version)	3:31

Australian, German, South Korean CD single (Released: Australia; March 27, 2007)
No.	Title	Length
1.	"Makes Me Wonder"	3:31
2.	"The Way I Was" (Non-album track)	4:19
3.	"Story" (Non-album track)	4:30
4.	"Makes Me Wonder" (Video)	3:42

UK enhanced maxi multimedia CD single (Released: May 14, 2007)
No.	Title	Length
1.	"Makes Me Wonder" (Album version)	3:31
2.	"The Way I Was" (Non-album track)	4:19

== Credits and personnel ==
Personnel taken from It Won't Be Soon Before Long liner notes, and Sound on Sound.

Studio

- Recorded at House of Blues Studios (Encino)
- Recorded at Sunset Sound Studios (Los Angeles)
- Mixed at Scream Studios (Florida)
- Mastered at Sterling Sound (New York City)

Maroon 5

- Adam Levine – vocals, guitar
- Jesse Carmichael – Roland Juno-106, acoustic piano, Fender Rhodes, Wurlitzer, guitar
- Mickey Madden – bass
- James Valentine – guitars
- Matt Flynn – drums

Additional musicians

- Lenny Castro – congas
- Mark Endert – bass synthesizer, drum programming, additional keyboards
- Ross Garfield – percussion technician

Production

- Mark Endert – production, mixing, recording engineer
- Maroon 5 – production
- Doug Tyo – assistant engineer
- Doug Johnson – digital editing
- Erik Swanson – digital editing
- Ted Jensen - mastering

== Charts ==
=== Weekly charts ===
Weekly chart performance for "Makes Me Wonder"
Chart (2007)	Peak position
Australia (ARIA)	6
Austria (Ö3 Austria Top 40)	12
Belgium (Ultratop 50 Flanders)	32
Belgium (Ultratop 50 Wallonia)	34
Canada Hot 100 (Billboard)	1
Canada AC (Billboard)	2
Canada CHR/Top 40 (Billboard)	2
Canada Hot AC (Billboard)	1
CIS Airplay (TopHit)	37
Croatia (HRT)	1
Czech Republic Airplay (ČNS IFPI)	10
Denmark (Tracklisten)	5
Europe (Eurochart Hot 100)	4
France (SNEP)	40
Germany (GfK)	11
Germany Airplay (BVMI)	1
Hungary (Rádiós Top 40)	1
Ireland (IRMA)	10
Italy (FIMI)	3
Netherlands (Dutch Top 40)	7
Netherlands (Single Top 100)	8
New Zealand (Recorded Music NZ)	8
Norway (VG-lista)	7
Scottish Singles Sales (Official Charts)	8
Slovakia Airplay (ČNS IFPI)	8
Sweden (Sverigetopplistan)	26
Switzerland (Schweizer Hitparade)	14
UK Singles (Official Charts)	2
US Billboard Hot 100	1
US Adult Contemporary (Billboard)	9
US Adult Pop Airplay (Billboard)	2
US Dance Club Songs (Billboard)	1
US Dance Airplay (Billboard)	1
US Latin Pop Airplay (Billboard)	39
US Pop Airplay (Billboard)	4
Venezuela Pop Rock (Record Report)	4

=== Year-end charts ===
2007 year-end chart performance for "Makes Me Wonder"
Chart (2007)	Position
Australia (ARIA)	45
Brazil (Crowley)	31
CIS (Tophit)	123
Europe (Eurochart Hot 100)	76
Germany (Official German Charts)	96
Hungary (Rádiós Top 40)	43
Netherlands (Dutch Top 40)	24
Netherlands (Single Top 100)	61
New Zealand (Recorded Music NZ)	36
Switzerland (Schweizer Hitparade)	60
UK Singles (OCC)	53
US Billboard Hot 100	13
US Adult Contemporary (Billboard)	19
US Adult Top 40 (Billboard)	1
US Dance Club Songs (Billboard)	45
US Dance/Mix Show Airplay (Billboard)	8
US Mainstream Top 40 (Billboard)	17

== Certifications ==
Certifications and sales for "Makes Me Wonder"
Region	Certification	Certified units/sales
Australia (ARIA)	2× Platinum	140,000^{‡}
Brazil (Pro-Música Brasil)	Platinum	60,000^{‡}
Canada (Music Canada)	Platinum	80,000^{*}
Denmark (IFPI Danmark)	Gold	7,500^{^}
Mexico (AMPROFON)	Diamond+4× Platinum	540,000^{*}
Mexico (AMPROFON) Pre-loaded track	Platinum+Gold	150,000^{*}
Mexico (AMPROFON) Ringtone	Diamond+2× Gold	270,000^{*}
New Zealand (RMNZ)	Gold	15,000^{‡}
Norway (IFPI Norway)	Gold	5,000^{*}
United Kingdom (BPI)	Silver	200,000^{‡}
United States (RIAA)	3× Platinum	2,923,000
^{*} Sales figures based on certification alone.^{^} Shipments figures based on certification alone.^{‡} Sales+streaming figures based on certification alone.

== Release history ==
Release dates and formats for "Makes Me Wonder"
Region	Date	Format	Label	Ref(s).
Australia	March 27, 2007	CD	A&M Octone	
Australia	April 3, 2007	Contemporary hit radio	A&M Octone	
Germany	May 11, 2007	CD	Universal	
United Kingdom	May 14, 2007	CD	Polydor	

== See also ==
- List of Hot 100 number-one singles of 2007 (U.S.)
- List of number-one dance singles of 2007 (U.S.)
- List of number-one dance airplay hits of 2007 (U.S.)
