= Wake Up Call (Maroon 5 song) =

2007 single by Maroon 5

Single by Maroon 5

from the album It Won't Be Soon Before Long
- B-side: "Story"; "Losing My Mind"
- Released: July 17, 2007
- Recorded: 2007
- Genre: Pop rock
- Length: 3:21
- Label: A&M Octone
- Songwriters: Adam Levine; James Valentine
- Producers: Mike Elizondo; Mark "Spike" Stent; Sam Farrar; Mark Endert

Maroon 5 singles chronology
"Makes Me Wonder" (2007)	"Wake Up Call" (2007)	"Won't Go Home Without You" (2007)

Music video
- "Wake Up Call" on YouTube

"Wake Up Call" is a song by American pop rock band Maroon 5. It was released on July 17, 2007, as the second single from their second studio album It Won't Be Soon Before Long (2007). The band performed the song on 45th at Night, which originally included a special guest Eve for the remix version, but never officially recorded. However, the band later requested artist Mary J. Blige, with musician Mark Ronson to work on the song's official remix version. The remix was released on November 13, 2007, and was included on the album's international limited deluxe edition and with both artists' remix albums (Call and Response by the band and Soul Is Forever by Blige), all released in 2008.

It is also featured on the television shows, Entourage and The Hills. Before the release of "Wake Up Call", the band promoted by performing it a half-step lower. The song was BBC Radio 1 playlisted for the playlist week beginning July 18, 2007. As of June 2014, the song has sold 1,821,000 copies in the US.

== Background ==
The band confirmed the song as the album's second single on MTV's Total Request Live on May 29, 2007.

== Music video ==
The music video for "Wake Up Call" is directed by Jonas Åkerlund and was filmed in Los Angeles in July 2007. The video is presented as a trailer for an imaginary NC-17-rated film. It features Adam Levine's leading lady for the video, Kim Smith, talking with the suspicious Levine, asking for his forgiveness since she had sex with another man whom Levine doesn't know and who serves as the antagonist. As the video progresses, Levine arrives home and hears noises coming from the bedroom. He kicks down the door and catches his girlfriend cheating on him with the other man (played by Jeremy Sisto). As his girlfriend tries to break up the fight while attempting to explain the reason of her infidelity, Levine immediately shoots him in the chest, killing him in the process while his girlfriend watched in horror as her lover dies. Levine covers up the body and drags it out of the bedroom. The rest of the video centers around the other members of Maroon 5 who committed different crimes, while Levine and Smith are going through an elaborate plan to cover up the murder. At the end of the video, Levine gets arrested and taken to custody.

=== Director's cut version ===
A director's cut version of the video includes additional scenes from the original video, with Maroon 5 guitarist James Valentine giving the finger while getting a mug shot and the ending scene where Levine is getting sentenced to death for the murder.

== Track listing ==
CD Promo
No.	Title	Length
1.	"Wake Up Call" (Album version)	3:21

UK 2-track CD single
No.	Title	Length
1.	"Wake Up Call" (Album version)	3:21
2.	"Story" (Non-LP version)	4:30

Australia 2-track CD single 1744499
No.	Title	Length
1.	"Wake Up Call" (Album version)	3:21
2.	"Losing My Mind" (Non-LP version)	3:22

CD single (Enhanced)
No.	Title	Length
1.	"Wake Up Call" (Album version)	3:21
2.	"Losing My Mind" (Non-LP version)	3:21
3.	"Makes Me Wonder" (Harry Choo Choo Romero's Bambossa Mix)	6:06
4.	"Wake Up Call" (Video)
5.	"Won't Go Home Without You" (Video)

== Charts and certifications ==
=== Weekly charts ===
Chart (2007–2008)	Peak position
Australia (ARIA)	19
Austria (Ö3 Austria Top 40)	17
Belgium (Ultratip Bubbling Under Flanders)	3
Belgium (Ultratip Bubbling Under Wallonia)	10
Canada Hot 100 (Billboard)	6
Canada AC (Billboard)	43
Canada CHR/Top 40 (Billboard)	5
Canada Hot AC (Billboard)	1
CIS Airplay (TopHit)	10
Czech Republic Airplay (ČNS IFPI)	72
Denmark (Tracklisten)	26
Germany (GfK)	41
Hungary (Editors' Choice Top 40)	35
Ireland (IRMA)	35
Italy (FIMI)	8
Netherlands (Dutch Top 40)	20
Netherlands (Single Top 100)	27
New Zealand (Recorded Music NZ)	32
Russia Airplay (TopHit)	6
Scottish Singles Sales (Official Charts)	33
Switzerland (Schweizer Hitparade)	12
UK Singles (Official Charts)	33
US Billboard Hot 100	19
US Adult Contemporary (Billboard)	19
US Adult Pop Airplay (Billboard)	3
US Pop Airplay (Billboard)	8
Venezuela Pop Rock (Record Report)	3

=== Year-end charts ===
Chart (2007)	Position
Australia (ARIA)	96
CIS (Tophit)	49
Russia Airplay (TopHit)	54
Switzerland (Schweizer Hitparade)	75
US Adult Top 40 (Billboard)	35

Chart (2008)	Position
Canada (Canadian Hot 100)	99
CIS (Tophit)	123
US Adult Top 40 (Billboard)	27
Russia Airplay (TopHit)	190

=== Decade-end charts ===
Decade-end chart performance for "Wake Up Call"
Chart (2000–2009)	Position
Russia Airplay (TopHit)	158

=== Certifications ===
Region	Certification	Certified units/sales
Australia (ARIA)	Platinum	70,000^{‡}
Brazil (Pro-Música Brasil)	Gold	30,000^{‡}
Canada (Music Canada)	Platinum	80,000^{*}
Mexico (AMPROFON)	4× Platinum+Gold	270,000^{*}
Mexico (AMPROFON) Pre-loaded	Platinum+Gold	150,000^{*}
United States (RIAA)	2× Platinum	2,000,000
^{*} Sales figures based on certification alone.^{‡} Sales+streaming figures based on certification alone.

== Release history ==
Release dates and formats for "Wake Up Call"
Region	Date	Format	Label	Ref(s).
United States	July 17, 2007	Contemporary hit radio	A&M Octone	
United Kingdom	August 27, 2007	CD	Polydor	
Germany	August 31, 2007	CD	Universal	
Australia	September 3, 2007	CD	Universal	
