= It Won't Be Soon Before Long =

Studio album by Maroon 5
- Released: May 16, 2007
- Recorded: 2006–2007
- Studios: The Mansion, Los Angeles, California; Conway, Hollywood, California; Glenwood Place; Sunset Sound, Hollywood, California; Studio at the Palms, Las Vegas, Nevada
- Genres: Pop rock; alternative rock; R&B; disco; electro-funk; blue-eyed soul
- Length: 40:32
- Label: A&M Octone
- Producers: Mike Elizondo; Mark Endert; Sam Farrar; Maroon 5; Mark "Spike" Stent; Eric Valentine

Maroon 5 chronology
Live – Friday the 13th (2005)	It Won't Be Soon Before Long (2007)	The B-Side Collection (2007)

Singles from It Won't Be Soon Before Long
- 1. "Makes Me Wonder" Released: March 27, 2007; 2. "Wake Up Call" Released: July 17, 2007; 3. "Won't Go Home Without You" Released: November 19, 2007; 4. "If I Never See Your Face Again" Released: May 2, 2008; 5. "Goodnight Goodnight" Released: August 21, 2008

It Won't Be Soon Before Long is the second studio album by American pop rock band Maroon 5. It was released on May 16, 2007, by A&M Octone Records, as the follow-up to their debut album, Songs About Jane (2002). The name was inspired by a phrase the band adopted to keep themselves motivated while on their tour.

The album debuted at number one on the U.S. Billboard 200, selling around 430,000 copies in its first week. It is the first to feature drummer Matt Flynn. The band's former drummer, percussionist and background vocalist Ryan Dusick, who officially left the band in 2006 due to serious wrist and shoulder injuries, was credited as the "Musical Director".

== Background ==
During the recording sessions for It Won't Be Soon Before Long, Maroon 5 not only recorded the 12 songs on the album, but also an additional 7 tracks. The extra songs were featured as B-sides to the album's singles, and later on The B-Side Collection. The band stated in interviews that the album has a different feel to it from their 2002 debut album Songs About Jane. The songs are not all based on one specific relationship, as in Jane, and also have a different sound than their first album, being more electric and drawing inspiration from such artists as Talking Heads, Michael Jackson and Prince. Guitarist James Valentine stated that the goal was to make the songs sound more "up-tempo" than the ones on their previous record. A review written prior to the album's release described the songs as having a very retro feel. Adam Levine, the band's lead singer, explained that this record is a little more self-confident and powerful lyrically: "...you can dance to it, there's a little more attitude."

According to Levine, working with other artists had influences on the album: "Kanye West and Alicia Keys are amazing talents, in totally different ways. Just seeing such amazing people working in the studio. I definitely took things away from them."

The chorus of "Nothing Lasts Forever" is the same as the one used in the Kanye West single "Heard 'Em Say", which features Levine, with exclusion to the line: "...the distance between us makes it so hard to stay...".

== Commercial reception ==
It Won't Be Soon Before Long debuted at number one on the US Billboard 200 albums chart, selling 429,000 copies in its first week of release. The album sold 102,000 copies digitally, breaking a record set the week before when Linkin Park's Minutes to Midnight (Machine Shop/Warner Bros.) moved 84,000 via that format to debut at No. 1. The latter album slips to No. 2 this week with 198,000, a 68% sales decline. In December 2007, the album ranked number one for iTunes top best selling albums of 2007.

In the UK, it became their second album to reach the number one spot, but their first to debut atop the UK Albums Chart. In Australia, it peaked at number five, lower than their first studio album Songs About Jane, which peaked at number one in 2004. It peaked at number two on the Canadian Albums Chart and New Zealand, number three in Ireland, Japan and Mexico, number five in Australia and Taiwan, and number six in Italy, Spain and Switzerland.

It Won't Be Soon Before Long was certified Gold in Ireland, Italy and New Zealand, platinum in Australia, Canada, Japan and the UK. 2× Platinum in the US, and 3× Platinum in South Korea. It was certified Diamond in Colombia and Mexico.

== Critical reception ==
Professional ratings
Aggregate scores
Source	Rating
Metacritic	66/100
Review scores
Source	Rating
AllMusic	4.5/5 stars
Blender	3.5/5 stars
Entertainment Weekly	B
Los Angeles Times	3/4 stars
Now	3/5
Rolling Stone	3.5/5 stars
Slant Magazine	3/5 stars
Spin	3.5/5 stars
The Times	3/5 stars
Ultimate Guitar	7/10
USA Today	2.5/4 stars

Initial critical response to It Won't Be Soon Before Long was positive. At Metacritic, which assigns a normalized rating out of 100 to reviews from mainstream critics, the album has received an average score of 66, based on 14 reviews.

AllMusic rated the album 4.5 stars out of 5, commenting that the production of the album "is so immaculate that it glistens". Billboard rated it 4.5 stars. This album was #32 on Rolling Stone's list of the Top 50 Albums of 2007. In 2017, Substream Magazine's Gabriel Aikins called the album "Still Maroon 5 at their best" a decade after its release.

== Songs ==
=== Singles ===
"Makes Me Wonder" was released as the lead single from the album on March 27, 2007. It became the band's first number-one on the Billboard Hot 100 and Billboard Dance Club Songs charts. The song won the Grammy Award for Best Pop Performance by a Duo or Group with Vocal at the 50th Grammy Awards, their second song to win the award. The song was among the most successful of 2007, and was their biggest hit until the release of "Moves like Jagger" by the band in 2011. It also reached number one in Canada and Hungary.

The second single, "Wake Up Call", was released on July 17, 2007. It peaked at number three in the Belgium region of Flanders, at number six in Canada, and eight in Italy. It became a top-twenty hit, peaking at number nineteen in Australia and the United States.

"Won't Go Home Without You" was released as the third single on November 19, 2007. It peaked at number 48 in the Billboard Hot 100. As of June 2014, the song has sold 1,647,000 copies in the US. The song became the first Maroon 5 single to fail to chart in the UK top 40, only peaking at number 44 on the UK Singles Chart.

The fourth single, "If I Never See Your Face Again" was re-recorded to feature singer Rihanna, and released digitally on May 2, 2008, to promote the June 2008 re-issue of the album, impacting mainstream radio stations on May 15, 2008. It achieved moderate chart success on singles charts around the world. In the United States, the song peaked at number 51 on the Billboard Hot 100 chart on July 26, 2008. It peaked at number 10 on the Adult Pop Songs chart; number 30 on the Pop Songs chart and 21 on the Hot Digital Songs chart. The song was nominated for Best Pop Collaboration with Vocals at the 51st Grammy Awards.

"Goodnight Goodnight" was released on August 21, 2008, as the album's fifth and final single. A music video premiered on Yahoo! Music, the same day. It was directed by Marc Webb and featuring actress Candace Bailey, playing the love interest of Adam Levine. The video is based on a "before and after" story which leads Levine and Bailey to a beautiful love story. The song appeared on The CW's fall 2008 advertisement. The band also performed the song in the television series CSI: NY, where they guest star in the episode "Page Turner".

== Track listing ==
Standard edition
No.	Title	Writer(s)	Producer(s)	Length
1.	"If I Never See Your Face Again"	Adam Levine; James Valentine	Mike Elizondo; Mark "Spike" Stent; Maroon 5	3:21
2.	"Makes Me Wonder"	Levine; Jesse Carmichael; Mickey Madden	Mark Endert; Maroon 5	3:31
3.	"Little of Your Time"	Levine	Eric Valentine; Maroon 5	2:17
4.	"Wake Up Call"	Levine; Valentine	Elizondo; Stent; Sam Farrar; Maroon 5	3:20
5.	"Won't Go Home Without You"	Levine	Elizondo; Stent; Maroon 5	3:51
6.	"Nothing Lasts Forever"	Levine	Elizondo; Stent; Maroon 5	3:07
7.	"Can't Stop"	Levine; Valentine	E. Valentine; Maroon 5	2:37
8.	"Goodnight Goodnight"	Levine	Elizondo; Stent; Maroon 5	4:03
9.	"Not Falling Apart"	Levine	Elizondo; Stent; Maroon 5	4:06
10.	"Kiwi"	Levine; Carmichael	Elizondo; Stent; Maroon 5	3:34
11.	"Better That We Break"	Levine	Elizondo; Stent; Maroon 5	3:07
12.	"Back at Your Door"	Levine; Carmichael	Endert; Maroon 5	3:47
Total length:				40:32

United States iTunes Store bonus track
No.	Title	Writer(s)	Producer(s)	Length
13.	"Figure It Out"	Levine	Stent; Maroon 5	3:00

Europe, Asia, South America, Africa bonus track
No.	Title	Writer(s)	Producer(s)	Length
13.	"Infatuation"	Levine	Elizondo; Stent; Maroon 5	4:27

United Kingdom, Australia bonus tracks
No.	Title	Writer(s)	Producer(s)	Length
13.	"Until You're Over Me"	Levine	Elizondo; Stent; Maroon 5	3:17
14.	"Infatuation"	Levine	Elizondo; Stent; Maroon 5	4:27

Japan bonus tracks
No.	Title	Writer(s)	Producer(s)	Length
13.	"Until You're Over Me"	Levine	Elizondo; Stent; Maroon 5	3:17
14.	"Infatuation"	Levine	Elizondo; Stent; Maroon 5	4:27
15.	"Losing My Mind"	Levine; Carmichael	Elizondo; Stent; Maroon 5	3:21

United States Best Buy bonus CD
No.	Title	Writer(s)	Producer(s)	Length
1.	"Miss You, Love You"	Levine; Carmichael	Jason Lader; Maroon 5	3:10
2.	"Losing My Mind"	Levine; Carmichael	Elizondo; Stent; Maroon 5	3:21

=== Korean/Australian limited deluxe edition ===
Korean/Australian limited deluxe edition bonus tracks CD
No.	Title	Writer(s)	Producer(s)	Length
13.	"Until You're Over Me"			3:17
14.	"Infatuation"			4:27
15.	"Losing My Mind"			3:21
16.	"Wake Up Call" (Mark Ronson remix featuring Mary J. Blige)			3:13
17.	"The Way I Was"	Levine	Jason Lader; Maroon 5	4:20
18.	"Story"	Levine; Carmichael	Jason Lader; Maroon 5	4:27
19.	"Won't Go Home Without You" (acoustic)			4:06

DVD
No.	Title	Length
1.	"Makes Me Wonder"
2.	"Wake Up Call (Director's Cut)" (music video)
3.	"Won't Go Home Without You" (music video)
4.	"Makes Me Wonder" (live)
5.	"This Love" (live)
6.	"Sunday Morning" (live)

=== Reissue ===
It Won't Be Soon Before Long was reissued in expanded form on June 29, 2008, in Australia and July 8, 2008, for the rest of the world via A&M/Octone. The package included a bonus DVD with four music videos and a full concert recorded on June 13, 2007, in Montreal, Quebec, Canada. The reissue contained the original 12 tracks plus five B-sides: "Infatuation", "Miss You Love You", "Until You're Over Me", "Story" and "Losing My Mind". Also added onto the track list is "If I Never See Your Face Again", Maroon 5's then-newest single featuring Rihanna. The Australian and UK versions included one more track, a remix of "Wake Up Call" by Mark Ronson featuring Mary J. Blige.

In Australia, the CD was only available as the "Special Edition", and the DVD was not included as the Limited Edition featured a DVD. The UK version also does not include the DVD.

CD

- Standard 12 tracks

Worldwide edition
No.	Title	Length
13.	"If I Never See Your Face Again" (featuring Rihanna)	3:22
14.	"Infatuation"	4:27
15.	"Miss You, Love You"	3:10
16.	"Until You're Over Me"	3:17
17.	"Story"	4:27
18.	"Losing My Mind"	3:21

UK and Australian edition
No.	Title	Length
13.	"Until You're Over Me"	3:17
14.	"Infatuation"	4:27
15.	"If I Never See Your Face Again" (featuring Rihanna)	3:22
16.	"Wake Up Call" (Mark Ronson remix featuring Mary J. Blige)	3:13
17.	"Story"	4:27
18.	"Losing My Mind"	3:21
19.	"Miss You, Love You"	3:10

DVD: Live from Le Cabaret in Montreal, Quebec – 6.13.2007
No.	Title	Length
1.	"If I Never See Your Face Again"	4:14
2.	"Makes Me Wonder"	4:36
3.	"Harder to Breathe"	2:54
4.	"The Sun"	8:21
5.	"Secret"	5:38
6.	"Shiver"	5:28
7.	"Won't Go Home Without You"	3:43
8.	"Sunday Morning"	5:47
9.	"Little of Your Time"	3:42
10.	"Sweetest Goodbye"	11:28
11.	"She Will Be Loved"	4:41
12.	"This Love"	5:09

Music videos
No.	Title	Length
1.	"Makes Me Wonder"
2.	"Wake Up Call"
3.	"Won't Go Home Without You"
4.	"If I Never See Your Face Again" (featuring Rihanna)

Sample credit

- "Nothing Lasts Forever" contains an interpolation of the 2005 song "Heard 'Em Say" by Kanye West featuring Adam Levine.
- "Goodnight Goodnight" contains an interpolation of the 2000 song "Kryptonite" by 3 Doors Down.

== Credits and personnel ==
All credits adapted from the album liner notes.

Maroon 5

- Adam Levine – vocals, guitar, drums (track 11)
- Jesse Carmichael – keyboards, guitar; slide guitar (track 11)
- Mickey Madden – bass (all tracks except 11)
- James Valentine – guitars
- Matt Flynn – drums (all tracks except 11)

Additional musicians

- Lenny Castro – percussion (tracks 1, 2 and 10)
- Matt Teal – additional keyboards (track 4)
- Adam MacDougall – additional keyboards (track 7)
- Rashida Jones – additional vocals (track 10)
- Bill Reichenbach – horns (track 10)
- Dan Higgins – horns (track 10)
- Gary Grant – horns (track 10)
- Jerry Hey – horns (track 10)
- David Campbell – strings, horns (arrangement and conducting) (track 12)
- Rihanna – guest vocals (track 13 on reissue)

Horns on "Kiwi"

- Gary Grant and Jerry Hey – trumpets (track 10)
- Bill Reichenbach – trombone (track 10)
- Dan Higgins – saxophone (track 10)

Production

- Mike Elizondo – production (tracks 1, 4–6 and 8–11), bass and additional piano (track 11), additional guitar (5), additional keyboards (1, 6 and 9)
- Mark "Spike" Stent – production (tracks 1, 4–6 and 8–11)
- Mark Endert – production (tracks 2 and 12), co-production (track 4), additional keyboards (tracks 1–2 and 4), audio mixing (1–2 and 4), recording engineer (1–2 and 4), music arranger (4), drum programming (1–2 and 4)
- Eric Valentine – production (tracks 3 and 7)
- Sam Farrar – production (track 4), additional arrangement (track 3), drum programming (track 4), additional keyboards (track 4)
- Ryan Dusick – musical director
- Adam Hawkins – Pro-Tools engineer (tracks 1, 4–6, 9 and 10)
- David Emery – digital editing (track 1), mix assistant (tracks 5–6, 8–9 and 11)
- Alex Dromgoole – mix assistant (tracks 5–6, 8–9 and 11)
- Ted Jensen – mastering
- Len Peltier – art direction and design
- Andrew Zuckerman – cover photography
- Wendy Sue Lamm – booklet photography
- Melinda Kelly – video commissioner

== Charts ==
=== Weekly charts ===
Weekly chart performance for It Won't Be Soon Before Long
Chart (2007)	Peak position
Australian Albums (ARIA)	5
Austrian Albums (Ö3 Austria)	14
Belgian Albums (Ultratop Flanders)	16
Belgian Albums (Ultratop Wallonia)	26
Canadian Albums (Billboard)	2
Danish Albums (Hitlisten)	10
Dutch Albums (Album Top 100)	4
Finnish Albums (Suomen virallinen lista)	11
French Albums (SNEP)	13
German Albums (Offizielle Top 100)	6
Hungarian Albums (MAHASZ)	16
Irish Albums (IRMA)	3
Italian Albums (FIMI)	4
Japanese Albums (Oricon)	3
Mexican Albums (Top 100 Mexico)	3
New Zealand Albums (RMNZ)	2
Norwegian Albums (VG-lista)	7
Portuguese Albums (AFP)	23
Scottish Albums (Official Charts)	1
Spanish Albums (Promusicae)	6
Swedish Albums (Sverigetopplistan)	15
Swiss Albums (Schweizer Hitparade)	6
Taiwanese Albums (Five Music)	2
UK Albums (Official Charts)	1
US Billboard 200	1
US Digital Albums (Billboard)	1
US Top Alternative Albums (Billboard)	3
US Top Catalog Albums (Billboard)	3
US Indie Store Album Sales (Billboard)	1

=== Year-end charts ===
2007 year-end chart performance for It Won't Be Soon Before Long
Chart (2007)	Position
Australian Albums (ARIA)	32
Dutch Albums (Album Top 100)	67
French Albums (SNEP)	173
Swiss Albums (Schweizer Hitparade)	68
UK Albums (OCC)	48
US Billboard 200	21
US Digital Albums (Billboard)	1

2008 year-end chart performance for It Won't Be Soon Before Long
Chart (2008)	Position
Australian Albums (ARIA)	71
US Billboard 200	59

== Certifications ==
Certifications for It Won't Be Soon Before Long
Region	Certification	Certified units/sales
Australia (ARIA)	2× Platinum	140,000^{‡}
Canada (Music Canada)	Platinum	100,000^{^}
Germany (BVMI)	Gold	100,000^{‡}
Ireland (IRMA)	Gold	7,500^{^}
Japan (RIAJ)	Platinum	250,000^{^}
Mexico (AMPROFON)	Platinum+Gold	150,000^{^}
New Zealand (RMNZ)	Gold	7,500^{^}
Norway (IFPI Norway)	Gold	20,000^{*}
Russia (NFPF)	Platinum	20,000^{*}
Singapore (RIAS)	Gold	5,000^{*}
United Kingdom (BPI)	Platinum	300,000^{^}
United States (RIAA)	2× Platinum	2,000,000^{^}
^{*} Sales figures based on certification alone.^{^} Shipments figures based on certification alone.^{‡} Sales+streaming figures based on certification alone.

== Release history ==
=== Standard edition ===
Release history for It Won't Be Soon Before Long
Country	Date
Japan	May 16, 2007
Belgium	May 18, 2007
Ireland	May 18, 2007
Italy	May 18, 2007
Netherlands	May 18, 2007
Switzerland	May 18, 2007
Australia	May 19, 2007
France	May 21, 2007
United Kingdom	May 21, 2007
Canada	May 22, 2007
United States	May 22, 2007
South Korea	May 22, 2007
Sweden	May 23, 2007
Brazil	May 24, 2007
Germany	May 25, 2007
South Korea (Limited deluxe edition)	February 19, 2008
Taiwan (Deluxe edition)	March 7, 2008
Australia (Deluxe edition)	March 15, 2008

=== Re-issue ===
Release history for It Won't Be Soon Before Long reissue
Region	Date
Australia	June 29, 2008
United States	July 8, 2008
