= Won't Go Home Without You =

2007 single by Maroon 5

Single by Maroon 5

from the album It Won't Be Soon Before Long
- B-side: "Miss You, Love You"
- Released: November 19, 2007
- Recorded: 2006–2007
- Genre: Pop rock; power ballad
- Length: 3:51 (album version); 3:45 (radio edit); 4:11 (video version)
- Label: A&M Octone
- Songwriter: Adam Levine
- Producers: Mike Elizondo; Mark "Spike" Stent; Maroon 5

Maroon 5 singles chronology
"Wake Up Call" (2007)	"Won't Go Home Without You" (2007)	"If I Never See Your Face Again" (2008)

Music video
- "Won't Go Home Without You" on YouTube

"Won't Go Home Without You" is a song by American band Maroon 5. It was released on November 19, 2007, as the third single from their second studio album It Won't Be Soon Before Long (2007). The guitar lines in the song are somewhat similar to The Police single "Every Breath You Take". In 2022, Billboard ranked it as the tenth best Maroon 5 song of all time.

== Critical reception ==
Reviews for "Won't Go Home Without You" have been generally positive, although some were mixed. Music journalist Robert Christgau gave a positive review on the album as well as the song, saying "The devilishly memorable "Won't Go Home Without You" combines confidence with affection rather than macho." Channel 4 called the song "[the] musical equivalent of a dog's fart at the dinner table" and gave it just one star out of a possible ten. Digital Spy gave the song two stars out of five, calling the song's lyrics "as cold, functional and ruthlessly effective as a state-of-the-art refrigerator".

== Chart performance ==
"Won't Go Home Without You" peaked at number 48 in the Billboard Hot 100. As of June 2014, the song has sold 1,647,000 copies in the US.

The song became the first Maroon 5 single to fail to chart in the UK top 40, only peaking at number 44 on the UK Singles Chart.

== Music video ==
On August 16, 2007, Maroon 5 posted a notice on their official website asking for fans to send in homemade videos to help the band make the video for this song; however, in October 2007, another video was released in Europe and Australia. The official video was directed by Sophie Muller and premiered on VH1 Top 20 Video Countdown on December 1, 2007.

The song's music video starts with flashbacks where Adam Levine (Maroon 5's lead singer) and a female character (portrayed by Tania Raymonde) appear to have an argument upon which Levine decides to leave. The video then cuts to Levine sitting in a chair thinking it over with the rest of the band performing in the background. Adam realizes that he 'will not go home without you', referring to the female he had walked out on. Levine appears to know where the woman is at the moment and decides to look for her. After having meandered through the city for a few hours - including bumping into a Chinese lion puppet - Levine eventually gets to a restaurant where he finds the woman, but to his disappointment, she is with another man.

This video features Jesse Carmichael playing both piano and guitar.

== Awards and nominations ==
Year	Ceremony	Category	Result	Ref.
2009	BMI Pop Awards	Award Winning Song	Won	
2009	Grammy Awards	Best Pop Performance from a Duo or Group with Vocals	Nominated	

== Track listings ==
Australian iTunes version
No.	Title	Length
1.	"Won't Go Home Without You" (radio mix)	3:45
2.	"Miss You, Love You"	3:10
3.	"Happy Xmas (War Is Over)"	3:28

German CD single [enhanced CD] 0602517533158
No.	Title	Length
1.	"Won't Go Home Without You" (radio mix)	3:45
2.	"Miss You, Love You"	3:10
3.	"Happy Xmas (War Is Over)"	3:28
4.	"Won't Go Home Without You" (video)	4:13

Italian iTunes version - Single
No.	Title	Length
1.	"Won't Go Home Without You" (acoustic version)	4:06

== Charts and certifications ==
=== Weekly charts ===
Weekly chart performance for "Won't Go Home Without You"
Chart (2007–2008)	Peak position
Australia (ARIA)	7
Austria (Ö3 Austria Top 40)	16
Belgium (Ultratip Bubbling Under Flanders)	10
Canada Hot 100 (Billboard)	16
Canada AC (Billboard)	16
Canada CHR/Top 40 (Billboard)	32
Canada Hot AC (Billboard)	3
CIS Airplay (TopHit)	62
Czech Republic Airplay (ČNS IFPI)	41
Germany (GfK)	11
Hungary (Editors' Choice Top 40)	26
Iceland (Tónlistinn)	1
Ireland (IRMA)	28
Italy (FIMI)	15
Italian Airplay (EarOne)	102
Netherlands (Dutch Top 40)	28
Netherlands (Single Top 100)	62
New Zealand (Recorded Music NZ)	20
Romania (Romanian Top 100)	50
Switzerland (Schweizer Hitparade)	65
UK Singles (Official Charts)	44
US Billboard Hot 100	48
US Adult Alternative Airplay (Billboard)	26
US Adult Contemporary (Billboard)	14
US Adult Pop Airplay (Billboard)	3
US Pop Airplay (Billboard)	25

Chart (2026)	Peak position
Philippines Hot 100 (Billboard Philippines)	85

=== Year-end charts ===
Year-end chart performance for "Won't Go Home Without You"
Chart (2007–08)	Position
Australia (ARIA, 2008)	75
Austria (Ö3 Austria Top 40, 2008)	71
Canada (Canadian Hot 100, 2008)	78
Canada Hot AC (Billboard, 2008)	18
Germany (Official German Charts, 2008)	67
Netherlands (Dutch Top 40, 2007)	190
US Adult Contemporary (Billboard, 2008)	28
US Adult Top 40 (Billboard, 2008)	16

=== Certifications ===
Certifications and sales for "Won't Go Home Without You"
Region	Certification	Certified units/sales
Australia (ARIA)	3× Platinum	210,000^{‡}
Brazil (Pro-Música Brasil)	Gold	30,000^{‡}
Canada (Music Canada)	Gold	40,000^{*}
Mexico (AMPROFON)	4× Platinum+Gold	270,000^{*}
Mexico (AMPROFON) Pre-loaded	Platinum+Gold	150,000^{*}
New Zealand (RMNZ)	Platinum	30,000^{‡}
United States (RIAA)	2× Platinum	1,647,000
^{*} Sales figures based on certification alone.^{‡} Sales+streaming figures based on certification alone.

== Release history ==
Release dates and formats for "Won't Go Home Without You"
Region	Date	Format	Label	Ref(s).
Australia	November 19, 2007	CD	Universal	
United Kingdom	November 19, 2007	CD	A&M Octone	
United States	November 20, 2007	Contemporary hit radio	A&M Octone	
Japan	November 21, 2007	CD	Universal	
Germany	January 8, 2008	CD	Universal	
